= List of Northampton Town F.C. players =

This is a list of notable footballers who have played for Northampton Town. The aim is for this list to include all players that have played 100 or more senior matches for the club. Other players who are deemed to have played an important role for the club can be included, but the reason for their notability should be included in the 'Notes' column.

For a list of all Northampton Town players with a Wikipedia article, see Category:Northampton Town F.C. players. For the current Northampton Town first-team squad, see the Players section of the club's main article.

Players are listed according to the year of their first team debut for the club, and then by order of surname. The 1909 FA Charity Shield match is included in the statistics, however wartime matches are excluded.

== Notable players ==
- Statistics correct as of 14 November 2026.

This and the † indicate that they are a club record holder
This indicates that they played their full career at Northampton Town.
Italics This indicates they received international honours while not at the club.
(n/a) = Information not available
Players in bold are still playing for the club. Players in italics were on loan at the club.

Name	Nat.	Position	Period	League		Total		International honours	Caps	Notes
Name	Nat.	Position	Period	Apps	Goals	Apps	Goals	International honours	Caps	Notes
James Frost	(England)	Outside forward	1900–1907	189	22	205	22			
Ralph Howe	(England)	Wing-half	1901–1906	155	2	169	2			
Herbert Neal	(England)	Wing-half	1901–1907	153	8	164	8			
Herbert Chapman	(England)	Inside forward	1901, 1904, 1907–1909	67	23	80	39			†
Peter Durber	(England)	Full-back	1902–1906	112	0	117	0			
Bill Perkins	(England)	Goalkeeper	1903–1906	101	0	109	0			
George Cooch	(England)	Goalkeeper	1905–1909	125	0	133	0			
Edwin Freeman	(England)	Outside forward	1905–1920	341	19	364	21			
Dave McCartney	(Scotland)	Centre-half	1907–1910	106	8	113	9			
Frank McDiarmid	(Scotland)	Outside forward	1907–1911	138	18	149	19			
Fred Lessons	(England)	Centre-forward	1907–1915	234	75	249	79			†
Lloyd Davies	(Wales)	Full-back	1907–1920	311	3	330	3	Wales	16	†
Albert Lewis	(England)	Inside forward	1908–1913	164	85	179	90			
Jock Manning	(Scotland)	Wing-half	1908–1920	264	8	283	8			
Fanny Walden	(England)	Outside forward	1909–1913, 1926–1927	128	27	137	29	England	2	†
Thomas Thorpe	(England)	Goalkeeper	1909–1914	254	2	270	2			
Bobby Hughes	(England)	Outside forward	1909–1915	112	23	116	23			
Fred Clipston	(England)	Full-back	1910–1920	174	6	185	6			
Harry King	(England)	Centre-forward	1911–1914	99	68	105	70			
Walter Tull	(England)	Wing-half	1911–1915	105	9	108	9			†
William Lockett	(England)	Centre-forward	1914–1926	262	100	282	109	England Schools		
Billy Pease	(England)	Outside forward	1919–1925	278	46	299	52	England	1	
Charles Smith	(England)	Goalkeeper	1919–1925	190	0	198	1			
Bob Hewison	(England)	Utility	1920–1925	99	8	108	9			†
Willie Watson	(England)	Full-back	1920–1929	326	4	352	5			
Billy Williams	(Wales)	Wing-half	1921–1926	187	3	203	3	Wales	1	
Thomas Jeffs	(England)	Full-back	1921–1927	143	0	160	0			
Louis Page	(England)	Outside forward	1922–1925	122	24	129	26	England	7	
Frank Brett	(England)	Full-back	1923–1929	254	4	273	4			
Ernie Cockle	(England)	Centre-forward	1924–1927	97	46	104	46			
Ralph Hoten	(England)	Inside forward	1924–1930	197	75	213	84			†
Len Hammond	(England)	Goalkeeper	1924–1933	301	0	326	0			
George Allon	(England)	Wing-half	1926–1931	185	7	192	7			
Robert Maloney	(Republic of Ireland)	Centre-half	1926–1931	183	4	194	4			
Tommy Wells	(England)	Outside forward	1926–1934	277	73	305	84			
William Cave	(England)	Goalkeeper	1926–1937	93	0	104	0			
Tom Smith	(England)	Inside forward	1927–1930	112	22	121	22			
Ted Bowen	(England)	Centre-forward	1927–1931	162	114	172	120			†
George O'Dell	(England)	Wing-half	1927–1932	147	10	158	10			
Albert Dawes	(England)	Centre-forward	1929–1933	164	82	175	94			†
Fred Dawes	(England)	Full-back	1929–1936	162	1	185	4			
Len Riches	(England)	Wing-half	1929–1937	136	8	151	9			
Frank Davies	(Wales)	Wing-half	1930–1933	144	7	164	13			
Tommy Boyle	(England)	Inside forward	1930–1935	142	33	151	35			
Danny Tolland	(Republic of Ireland)	Inside forward	1933–1937	138	26	150	30			
Billy Thayne	(England)	Centre-half	1935–1938	138	0	143	0			
Bill Gormlie	(England)	Goalkeeper	1935–1938	133	0	143	0			
Sid Russell	(England)	Full-back	1935–1938	109	0	117	0			
Bobby King	(England)	Forward	1937–1939, 1947–1949	99	23	102	23			
Bill Barron	(England)	Full-back	1938–1951	166	4	189	4			†
Gwyn Hughes	(Wales)	Wing-half	1945–1956	226	15	246	19			
Tom Smalley	(England)	Full-back	1945–1951	200	2	226	2	England	1	
Dave Smith	(England)	Inside forward	1946–1951	128	31	142	33			
Tommy Fowler	(England)	Outside forward	1946–1961	521	84	552	88			†
Dave Bowen	(Wales)	Wing-half	1947–1950, 1959–1960	34	1	35	1	Wales	19	†
Bill Coley	(England)	Wing-half	1947–1951	104	7	113	7			
Jack English	(England)	Outside forward	1947–1960	302	135	322	143			†
Jack Ansell	(England)	Goalkeeper	1948–1952	131	0	142	0			
Ben Collins	(England)	Centre-half	1948–1959	213	0	224	0			
Arnold Woollard	(Bermuda)	Centre-half	1949–1952, 1962–1963	31+	0+	31+	0+	Bermuda	1	†
Maurice Candlin	(England)	Half-back	1949–1953	139	1	152	2			
Jack Southam	(England)	Full-back	1949–1955	145	1	156	2			
John Smith	(England)	Wing-half	1949–1960	186	9	195	9			
Willie O'Donnell	(Scotland)	Centre-forward	1951–1954	105	44	109	44			
Fred Ramscar	(England)	Inside forward	1951–1955	139	55	146	59			
Alf Wood	(England)	Goalkeeper	1951–1955	139	0	146	0			
Tom McLain	(England)	Wing-half	1952–1955	96	11	101	11			
Ron Patterson	(England)	Full-back	1952–1962	300	5	317	5			
Maurice Marston	(England)	Full-back	1953–1957	149	2	155	2			
Ray Yeoman	(Scotland)	Wing-half	1953–1959	169	4	176	4			
Roly Mills	(England)	Wing-half	1954–1964	305	30	324	33	England Youth		
Ken Leek	(Wales)	Inside forward	1955–1958, 1964–1965	87	31	93	33	Wales	13	†
Alan Woan	(England)	Inside forward	1956–1959	119	68	123	69			
Tony Claypole	(England)	Full-back	1956–1961	116	1	125	1			
Colin Gale	(Wales)	Centre-half	1956–1962	211	0	222	1			
Derek Leck	(England)	Wing-half	1958–1966	246	45	267	49			
Terry Branston	(England)	Centre-half	1960–1967	246	2	271	2			
Barry Lines	(England)	Outside forward	1960–1970	266	48	294	50			
Cliff Holton	(England)	Inside forward	1961–1962	62	50	68	54			†
Mike Everitt	(England)	Full-back	1961–1967	207	15	227	17			
Theo Foley	(Republic of Ireland)	Full-back	1961–1967	204	8	220	11	Republic of Ireland	9	†
John Kurila	(Scotland)	Wing-half	1962–1963, 1964–1968	148	4	162	8			
Graham Carr	(England)	Half-back	1962–1968	85	0	96	0	England Youth		†
Frank Large	(England)	Centre-forward	1962–1963; 1966–1967; 1969–1972	220	88	250	96			
Don Martin	(England)	Utility	1962–1968, 1976–1978	228	69	252	81	England Youth		
Bryan Harvey	(England)	Goalkeeper	1963–1967	165	0	181	0			
Billy Best	(Scotland)	Utility	1963–1968, 1973–1978	243	49	271	56			†
Jim Hall	(England)	Centre-forward	1963–1967, 1975–1978	124	35	141	39	England Youth		†
Joe Kiernan	(Scotland)	Wing-half	1963–1971	308	13	352	14			
Graham Moore	(Wales)	Inside forward	1964–1967	53	10	59	12	Wales	21	†
John Mackin	(Scotland)	Full-back	1965–1969	101	11	112	13			
John Clarke	(England)	Centre-half	1965–1975	233	1	262	1	England Youth		
Graham Felton	(England)	Winger	1966–1976	254	25	286	27	England Youth		
Ron Flowers	(England)	Midfielder	1967–1969	62	4	67	4	England	49	†
John Roberts	(Wales)	Utility	1967–1969	62	11	67	13	Wales	22	†
John Fairbrother	(England)	Forward	1968–1971	140	56	164	62			
Ray Fairfax	(England)	Full-back	1968–1971	116	2	138	2			
Frank Rankmore	(Wales)	Centre-back	1968–1971	103	15	126	19	Wales	1	
Phil Neal	(England)	Utility	1968–1974	187	28	208	30	England	50	
Dixie McNeil	(England)	Forward	1969–1972	85	33	102	38			
Trevor Gould	(England)	Midfielder	1970–1973	105	6	110	6	England Youth		†
John Buchanan	(Scotland)	Midfielder	1970–1974, 1981–1983	183	30	209	34			
Alan Starling	(England)	Goalkeeper	1971–1976	238	1	258	1			
Barry Tucker	(Wales)	Full-back	1971–1977, 1982–1984	277	8	302	8			
John Gregory	(England)	Utility	1972–1977	187	8	203	10	England	6	
Paul Stratford	(England)	Forward	1972–1978	172	59	188	61			†
Stuart Robertson	(England)	Centre-back	1972–1979	254	27	281	29			†
Dave Carlton	(England)	Midfielder	1973–1977, 1980–1982	180	7	194	8			
Derrick Christie	(England)	Winger	1974–1979	138	18	156	21			
John Farrington	(England)	Winger	1974–1980	232	29	253	31			
Steve Phillips	(England)	Forward	1975–1977, 1980–1982	126	38	141	43	England Youth		†
Andy McGowan	(England)	Midfielder	1975–1978	105	14	111	14	England Youth		
Steve Bryant	(England)	Midfielder	1976–1979, 1982	107	5	117	5			†
George Reilly	(Scotland)	Forward	1976–1980	127	45	144	54			
Keith Williams	(England)	Midfielder	1976–1981	131	6	142	7			†
Andy Poole	(England)	Goalkeeper	1978–1982	141	0	157	0			†
Paul Saunders	(England)	Utility	1978–1983	125	5	141	5			
Peter Denyer	(England)	Midfielder	1979–1983	147	28	169	34			
Mark Heeley	(England)	Winger	1979–1983	92	5	110	6			
Adam Sandy	(England)	Midfielder	1979–1983	104	6	113	8			
Wakeley Gage	(England)	Centre-back	1979–1985	218	17	253	22			†
Gary Saxby	(England)	Midfielder	1980–1983	96	11	114	14			
Adrian Burrows	(England)	Centre-back	1982–1984	88	4	106	5			
Peter Gleasure	(England)	Goalkeeper	1983–1991	344	0	412	0			†
Steve Brown	(England)	Midfielder	1983–1985, 1989–1994	173	22	205	26			
Russell Lewis	(Wales)	Centre-back	1983–1986	132	6	155	6	Wales Semi-pro		†
Brian Mundee	(England)	Full-back	1983–1986	100	3	118	4	England Youth		
Ian Benjamin	(England)	Forward	1984–1988	150	59	180	69	England Youth		†
Warren Donald	(England)	Midfielder	1984–1990	188	13	220	14	England Schools		
Richard Hill	(England)	Midfielder	1985–1987	86	46	103	52			†
Trevor Morley	(England)	Forward	1985–1988	107	39	130	45	England Semi-pro		†
Graham Reed	(England)	Full-back	1985–1988	112	2	138	2			
Phil Chard	(England)	Utility	1985–1988, 1989–1994	278	46	331	54			†
Eddie McGoldrick	(Republic of Ireland)	Midfielder	1986–1988	107	9	130	11	Republic of Ireland	15	
Dave Gilbert	(England)	Winger	1986–1989	120	21	145	27			
Russ Wilcox	(England)	Centre-back	1986–1990	138	9	162	10	England Semi-pro		
Keith McPherson	(England)	Centre-back	1986–1990	182	8	216	9			†
Paul Wilson	(England)	Full-back	1987–1992	141	6	168	7			
Steve Berry	(England)	Midfielder	1988–1991	102	7	123	10			
Trevor Quow	(England)	Midfielder	1988–1992	88	2	100	2	England Youth		
Tony Adcock	(England)	Forward	1988–1989, 1991–1992	107	40	122	46			†
Bobby Barnes	(England)	Forward	1989–1992	98	37	118	44	England Youth		
Terry Angus	(England)	Centre-back	1990–1993	116	6	138	6			
Micky Bell	(England)	Winger	1990–1994	153	10	178	12			
Steve Terry	(England)	Centre-back	1990–1994	181	17	211	18			†
Jason Burnham	(England)	Full-back	1991–1994	88	2	108	2			
Barry Richardson	(England)	Goalkeeper	1991–1994	96	0	113	0			†
Lee Colkin	(England)	Full-back	1991–1998	99	3	119	4			
Darren Harmon	(England)	Midfielder	1992–1995	89	12	106	13			†
Ian Sampson	(England)	Centre-back	1994–2004	390	26	449	31			†
Neil Grayson	(England)	Forward	1994–1997	120	31	141	34			†
Ray Warburton	(England)	Centre-back	1994–1998	187	12	222	16			†
Andy Woodman	(England)	Goalkeeper	1995–1999	163	0	197	0			
Dean Peer	(England)	Midfielder	1995–2000	128	5	156	7			
Roy Hunter	(England)	Midfielder	1995–2002	177	17	211	20			
Ali Gibb	(England)	Winger	1996–2000	129	4	158	4			
Sean Parrish	(Wales)	Midfielder	1996–2000	108	12	122	16			
Ian Clarkson	(England)	Full-back	1996–2000	94	1	119	2			†
James Hunt	(England)	Midfielder	1997–2002	174	8	205	10			
John Frain	(England)	Full-back	1997–2003	213	4	252	8			
Carlo Corazzin	(Canada)	Forward	1998–2000	78	30	89	32	Canada	59	†
Dave Savage	(Republic of Ireland)	Midfielder	1998–2001	113	18	124	18	Republic of Ireland	5	
Richard Hope	(England)	Centre-back	1998–2003	134	7	153	7			
Duncan Spedding	(England)	Full-back	1998–2003	123	1	143	1			
Ian Hendon	(England)	Full-back	1999–2000	60	3	66	4	England Under-21		†
Keith Welch	(England)	Goalkeeper	1999–2002	117	0	127	0			†
Jamie Forrester	(England)	Forward	2000–2003	121	45	136	50	England Youth		
Marco Gabbiadini	(England)	Forward	2000–2003	120	25	136	30	England 'B'		
Chris Hargreaves	(England)	Midfielder	2000–2004	151	6	175	11			†
Derek Asamoah	(Ghana)	Forward	2001–2004	112	10	132	13	Ghana	4	
Paul Trollope	(Wales)	Midfielder	2002–2004	84	8	100	8	Wales	9	
Lee Harper	(England)	Goalkeeper	2002–2007	156	0	182	0			†
Chris Willmott	(England)	Centre-back	2003–2005	81	1	101	1			
Josh Low	(Wales)	Winger	2003–2006	102	15	124	19	Wales Under-21		†
Martin Smith	(England)	Midfielder	2003–2006	104	23	127	29	England Under-21		
Luke Chambers	(England)	Centre-back	2003–2007	122	1	149	1			
Marc Richards	(England)	Forward	2003–2005, 2014–2018	176	54	210	63	England Under-20		†
Chris Doig	(Scotland)	Centre-back	2003, 2005–2009	129	4	147	5	Scotland Under-21		
Scott McGleish	(England)	Forward	2004–2007, 2008–2009	120	43	143	56			†
Mark Bunn	(England)	Goalkeeper	2004–2008	90	0	106	0			†
Ian Taylor	(England)	Midfielder	2005–2007	66	8	74	8			†
Andy Kirk	(Northern Ireland)	Forward	2005–2008	106	30	123	36	Northern Ireland	11	
Jason Crowe	(England)	Full-back	2005–2009, 2011–2012	182	14	205	17	England Under-20		
Ryan Gilligan	(England)	Midfielder	2005–2011	181	20	206	23			
Mark Hughes	(England)	Centre-back	2006–2009	93	4	106	4			
Chris Dunn	(England)	Goalkeeper	2006–2011	98	0	110	0			
Andy Holt	(England)	Utility	2006–2012	191	16	220	17			
Danny Jackman	(England)	Full-back	2007–2009	82	9	93	9			†
Adebayo Akinfenwa	(England)	Forward	2007–2010, 2011–2013	168	71	188	74			†
Luke Guttridge	(England)	Midfielder	2008–2010, 2012–2013	100	10	112	14			
Abdul Osman	(Ghana)	Midfielder	2008–2011	104	7	118	7			
Michael Jacobs	(England)	Winger	2009–2012, 2025–2026	107	12	128	17			†
John Johnson	(England)	Full-back	2009–2013	139	13	151	14			
Ben Tozer	(England)	Utility	2010–2015	173	6	199	7			
Kelvin Langmead	(England)	Centre-back	2011–2015	90	11	104	12			†
Chris Hackett	(England)	Winger	2012–2016	122	11	138	12			
Ivan Toney	(England)	Forward	2012–2015	53	11	60	13	England	6	†
Zander Diamond	(Scotland)	Centre-back	2014–2017	113	3	125	5	Scotland 'B'		†
Brendan Moloney	(Republic of Ireland)	Full-back	2014–2018	104	2	115	2	Republic of Ireland Under-21		
John-Joe O'Toole	(Republic of Ireland)	Midfielder	2014–2019	173	33	194	35	Republic of Ireland Under-21		†
Ryan Watson	(England)	Midfielder	2014, 2015, 2019–2021	80	13	101	17			†
Ricky Holmes	(England)	Winger	2015–2016, 2020	58	15	64	17	England 'C'		†
Nicky Adams	(Wales)	Winger	2015–2016, 2019–2021	90	4	107	6	Wales Under-21		†
Adam Smith	(England)	Goalkeeper	2015–2017	86	0	94	0			†
David Buchanan	(Northern Ireland)	Full-back	2015–2019	162	1	187	1	Northern Ireland Under-21		
**Sam Hoskins**	(England)	Winger	2015–	424	95	479	105			†
Shaun McWilliams	(England)	Midfielder	2016–2024	200	6	229	7			
David Cornell	(Wales)	Goalkeeper	2016–2020	92	0	108	0	Wales Under-21		
Charlie Goode	(England)	Centre-back	2019–2020	53	3	62	4	England 'C'		†
**Max Dyche**	(England)	Centre-back	2020–	87	3	106	3			
Fraser Horsfall	(England)	Centre-back	2020–2022	85	12	100	12	England 'C'		†
Jack Sowerby	(England)	Midfielder	2020–2025	140	2	153	2			
**Jon Guthrie**	(England)	Centre-back	2021–	176	17	193	17			†
Mitch Pinnock	(England)	Winger	2021–2025	182	24	200	25	England 'C'		†
Aaron McGowan	(England)	Full-back	2021–2025	122	3	131	3			
Liam Roberts	(England)	Goalkeeper	2021–2022	46	0	49	0			†
Marc Leonard	(Scotland)	Midfielder	2022–2024	91	6	97	6			†
Louis Appéré	(Scotland)	Forward	2022–2024	98	17	106	18			
Lee Burge	(England)	Goalkeeper	2022–2026	108	0	113	0			
