= List of Northampton Town F.C. seasons =

This is a list of seasons played by Northampton Town Football Club in English football. It covers the period from the club's inaugural season in 1899, to the end of the last completed season. It details the club's achievements in all major competitions, together with the top scorers and the average attendances for each season. Details of the abandoned 1939–40 season and unofficial Second World War leagues are not included.

Northampton Town were founded in 1897, joining the Northamptonshire League and then the Midland League for two seasons before taking their place in the Southern League, and finally joined The Football League for the 1920–21 season.

== Seasons ==
Season	League										FA Cup	League Cup	League Trophy	Other		Most appearances		Top goalscorer(s)		Avg. Att
Season	Division	Lvl	P	W	D	L	F	A	Pts	Pos	FA Cup	League Cup	League Trophy	Competition	Res	Overall	A	Overall	G	Avg. Att
1897–98	NL		14	7	1	6	33	35	15	4th	DNE					Three Players	14	(England) Albert Dunkley (England) Maurice Jones	6	n/a
1898–99	NL		16	13	2	1	49	17	28	1st	2QR					Six Players	18	(England) Everard Lawrence	20	n/a
1899–1900	ML		24	16	2	6	66	36	34	3rd	1QR			Northants Senior Cup	RU	(Scotland) Jack Hendry	25	(England) F. Warner	14	n/a
1900–01	ML		26	13	10	7	65	43	33	3rd	1QR					Three Players	27	(England) F. Warner	14	n/a
1901–02	SL		30	11	5	14	53	64	27	11th	R1			Northants Senior Cup	RU	Three Players	37	(England) Tim Coleman	17	2,928
1902–03	SL		30	12	6	12	39	48	30	8th	1QR			Northants Senior Cup	RU	Five Players	30	(England) Len Benbow	22	1,812
1903–04	SL		34	10	7	17	36	60	27	15th	3QR					(England) Bill Perkins	35	(England) Len Benbow	10	2,550
1904–05	SL		34	12	8	14	43	54	32	12th	5QR			Northants Senior Cup	W	(England) Bill Perkins	37	(England) Herbert Chapman	10	n/a
1905–06	SL		34	8	5	21	32	79	21	18th	R1					(England) Bill Perkins	37	(England) Harry Springthorpe	7	n/a
1906–07	SL		38	5	9	24	29	88	19	20th	R1					(England) Pat Tirrell (Wales) Mart Watkins	40	(Wales) Mart Watkins	12	n/a
1907–08	SL		38	15	11	12	50	41	41	8th	R1					(England) George Cooch (Scotland) Dave McCartney	40	(England) Jack Platt	14	n/a
1908–09	SL		40	25	5	10	90	45	55	1st	R1			FA Charity Shield	RU	(England) Fred Lessons	43	(England) Albert Lewis	31	n/a
1909–10	SL		42	22	4	16	90	44	48	4th	R2					(England) Thomas Thorpe (England) Fred Whitaker	46	(England) Albert Lewis	26	n/a
1910–11	SL		38	18	12	8	54	27	48	2nd	R2					(England) Thomas Thorpe	41	(England) Albert Lewis	14	n/a
1911–12	SL		38	22	7	9	82	41	51	3rd	R3					(England) Thomas Thorpe (England) Jack Hampson	42	(England) Harry King	21	n/a
1912–13	SL		38	12	12	14	61	48	36	10th	R1					Four Players	39	(England) Harry King	27	n/a
1913–14	SL		38	14	19	5	50	37	47	3rd	R1					(England) Fred Clipston (Scotland) Jock Manning	39	(England) Harry King	22	n/a
1914–15	SL		38	19	5	14	56	51	43	5th	R1					(England) Bobby Hughes	40	(England) Bobby Hughes (England) William Lockett	13	n/a
The Football League and FA Cup were suspended until after World War I.
1919–20	SL		42	12	9	21	64	103	33	19th	6QR					(England) Frank Grendon	44	(England) George Whitworth	24	n/a
1920–21	Div 3	3	42	15	8	19	59	75	38	14th	R1					(England) Billy Pease	45	(England) George Whitworth	31	7,125
1921–22	Div 3 S	3	42	13	11	18	47	71	37	17th	R2					(England) Billy Pease (England) William Lockett	45	(England) William Lockett	21	6,725
1922–23	Div 3 S	3	42	17	11	14	54	44	45	8th	5QR					(England) Billy Pease (England) Charles Smith	43	(England) William Lockett	14	8,250
1923–24	Div 3 S	3	42	17	11	14	64	47	45	8th	R1					Four Players	47	(England) William Lockett (England) Ernest Myers	20	9,425
1924–25	Div 3 S	3	42	20	6	16	51	44	46	9th	R1					(England) Willie Watson	43	(England) Louis Page	14	7,400
1925–26	Div 3 S	3	42	17	7	18	82	80	41	12th	R3					(England) Ernie Cockle	46	(England) Les Robinson	29	6,978
1926–27	Div 3 S	3	42	15	5	22	59	87	35	18th	R2					(England) Frank Brett (England) Len Hammond	45	(England) Ernie Cockle	15	6,053
1927–28	Div 3 S	3	42	23	9	10	102	64	55	2nd	R3					(England) Tom Smith	46	(England) Harry Loasby	21	10,095
1928–29	Div 3 S	3	42	20	12	10	96	57	52	3rd	R3					(England) Tom Smith	43	(England) Ted Bowen	34	10,131
1929–30	Div 3 S	3	42	21	8	13	82	58	50	4th	R3					(England) Len Hammond	45	(England) Ted Bowen	28	8,833
1930–31	Div 3 S	3	42	18	12	12	77	59	48	6th	R1					(England) Albert Dawes	43	(England) Ted Bowen	28	7,846
1931–32	Div 3 S	3	42	16	7	19	69	69	39	14th	R4					(England) Len Hammond	45	(England) Albert Dawes	18	6,535
1932–33	Div 3 S	3	42	18	8	16	76	66	44	8th	R2					Three Players	43	(England) Albert Dawes	37	6,056
1933–34	Div 3 S	3	42	14	12	16	71	78	40	13th	R5			Football League; Third Division; South Cup	R3	(Wales) Frank Davies	47	(England) George Henson	20	6,271
1934–35	Div 3 S	3	42	19	8	15	65	67	46	7th	R3			Football League; Third Division; South Cup	R3	(England) Richard Brown	46	(England) Richard Brown	14	6,420
1935–36	Div 3 S	3	42	15	8	19	62	90	38	15th	R1			Football League; Third Division; South Cup	SF	(England) Richard Brown	44	(England) Tommy Bell	16	7,050
1936–37	Div 3 S	3	42	20	6	16	85	68	46	7th	R1			Football League; Third Division; South Cup	R1	(Scotland) Billy Simpson	44	(England) Ralph Allen	27	9,960
1937–38	Div 3 S	3	42	17	9	16	51	57	43	9th	R1			Football League; Third Division; South Cup	R1	(England) Bill Gormlie	44	(England) Ralph Allen	14	7,416
1938–39	Div 3 S	3	42	15	8	19	51	58	38	17th	R1			Football League; Third Division; South Cup	R2	(England) Billy Thayne	46	(England) Fred Tilson	8	8,001
The Football League and FA Cup were suspended until after World War II.
1945–46	n/a^{[D]}										R3	n/a			Grp	n/a				
1946–47	Div 3 S	3	42	15	10	17	72	75	40	13th	R3					(England) Tom Smalley (England) Dave Smith	46	(Scotland) Archie Garrett	32	7,951
1947–48	Div 3 S	3	42	14	11	17	58	72	39	14th	R2					(England) Tom Smalley	46	(England) James Briscoe	12	8,571
1948–49	Div 3 S	3	42	12	9	21	51	62	33	20th	R2					(England) Bill Barron	42	Four Players	8	9,211
1949–50	Div 3 S	3	42	20	11	11	72	50	51	2nd	R5					(England) Jack Ansell (England) Tom Smalley	49	(England) Bert Mitchell	20	12,677
1950–51	Div 3 S	3	46	10	16	20	55	67	36	21st	R4					(England) Bert Mitchell	46	(Scotland) Adam McCulloch	13	10,308
1951–52	Div 3 S	3	46	22	5	19	93	74	49	8th	R1					(England) Fred Ramscar	47	(England) Fred Ramscar	24	12,095
1952–53	Div 3 S	3	46	26	10	10	109	70	62	3rd	R2					Five Players	49	(Scotland) Willie O'Donnell	27	12,031
1953–54	Div 3 S	3	46	20	11	15	82	55	51	5th	R2					(England) Tommy Fowler (England) Alf Wood	49	(England) Jack English	31	10,289
1954–55	Div 3 S	3	46	19	8	19	73	81	46	13th	R1					(England) Tommy Fowler	47	(England) Bernard Jones	15	7,852
1955–56	Div 3 S	3	46	20	7	19	67	71	47	11th	R3					Three Players	49	(England) Jack English	19	11,319
1956–57	Div 3 S	3	46	18	9	19	66	73	45	14th	R1					(England) Tommy Fowler	46	(England) Syd Asher	11	8,158
1957–58	Div 3 S	3	46	19	6	21	87	79	44	13th	R4					(Wales) Colin Gale	50	(England) Barry Hawkings	22	8,127
1958–59	Div 4	4	46	21	9	16	85	78	51	8th	R2					(England) Tommy Fowler	47	(England) Alan Woan	32	8,090
1959–60	Div 4	4	46	22	9	15	85	63	53	6th	R1					(England) Tommy Fowler (England) Roly Mills	42	(England) Mike Deakin	20	8,306
1960–61	Div 4 ↑	4	46	25	10	11	90	62	60	3rd	R3	R2				(England) Roly Mills	50	(England) Laurie Brown	25	10,682
1961–62	Div 3	3	46	20	11	15	85	57	51	8th	R3	R1		Northants Senior Cup	RU	(England) Derek Leck	50	(England) Cliff Holton	39	13,420
1962–63	Div 3 ↑	3	46	26	10	10	109	60	62	1st	R1	R3		Northants Senior Cup	RU	(Scotland) Chic Brodie (England) Barry Lines	50	(England) Alec Ashworth	26	12,680
1963–64	Div 2	2	42	16	9	17	58	60	41	11th	R3	R3		Northants Senior Cup	RU	(England) Terry Branston (England) Mike Everitt	45	(England) Frank Large	12	15,366
1964–65	Div 2 ↑	2	42	20	16	6	66	50	56	2nd	R3	QF		Northants Senior Cup	W	(Republic of Ireland) Theo Foley (England) Bryan Harvey	47	(England) Don Martin	16	15,393
1965–66	Div 1 ↓	1	42	10	13	19	55	92	33	21st	R3	R3				(Scotland) Joe Kiernan	45	(England) Bobby Brown	10	18,584
1966–67	Div 2 ↓	2	42	12	6	24	47	84	30	21st	R3	QF		Northants Senior Cup	W	(England) Barry Lines	44	(England) Don Martin	18	11,977
1967–68	Div 3	3	46	14	13	19	58	72	41	17th	R1	R3				(England) Brian Faulkes	45	(England) Don Martin	13	8,937
1968–69	Div 3 ↓	3	46	14	12	20	54	61	40	21st	R3	R1		Northants Senior Cup	RU	(England) Ray Fairfax	48	(England) John Fairbrother	14	6,790
1969–70	Div 4	4	46	16	12	18	64	55	44	14th	R5	R1		Northants Senior Cup	RU	(England) John Fairbrother	56	(England) John Fairbrother	25	5,594
1970–71	Div 4	4	46	19	13	14	63	59	51	7th	R1	R3		Northants Senior Cup	W	(England) Kim Book	53	(England) John Fairbrother	18	6,602
1971–72	Div 4	4	46	12	13	21	66	79	37	21st	R2	R1		Northants Senior Cup	W	(England) Alan Starling	50	(England) Frank Large	22	4,486
1972–73	Div 4	4	46	10	11	25	40	73	31	23rd	R1	R1		Northants Senior Cup	W	(Scotland) Billy Baxter	43	(England) Phil Neal	9	2,835
1973–74	Div 4	4	46	20	13	13	63	48	53	5th	R2	R1				Three Players	50	(Scotland) John Buchanan (England) Paul Stratford	15	5,424
1974–75	Div 4	4	46	15	11	20	67	73	41	16th	R2	R2				(Scotland) Billy Best	51	(England) Paul Stratford	16	4,179
1975–76	Div 4 ↑	4	46	29	10	7	87	40	68	2nd	R1	R1		Northants Senior Cup	W	(Wales) Barry Tucker	49	(England) Jim Hall	22	6,416
1976–77	Div 3 ↓	3	46	13	8	25	60	75	34	22nd	R1	R2				(England) John Gregory	50	(England) Paul Stratford	13	5,750
1977–78	Div 4	4	46	17	13	16	63	68	47	10th	R2	R2				(England) John Farrington (Scotland) George Reilly	49	(Scotland) George Reilly	22	3,517
1978–79	Div 4	4	46	15	9	22	64	76	39	19th	R1	R3				(England) John Farrington	52	(Scotland) George Reilly	23	2,829
1979–80	Div 4	4	46	16	12	18	51	66	44	13th	R1	R3				(England) Peter Denyer	52	(Wales) Keith Bowen	12	3,024
1980–81	Div 4	4	46	18	13	15	65	67	49	10th	R1	R1				(England) Andy Poole	49	(England) Steve Phillips	22	2,305
1981–82	Div 4	4	46	11	9	26	57	84	42	22nd	R2	R3				(England) Andy Poole	54	(England) Steve Phillips	12	2,308
1982–83	Div 4	4	46	14	12	20	65	75	54	15th	R3	R2	Grp			(England) Steve Massey (Scotland) Ian Phillips	54	(England) Steve Massey	25	2,594
1983–84	Div 4	4	46	13	14	19	53	78	53	18th	R2	R1	R1			(England) Peter Gleasure	54	(England) Terry Austin	13	2,343
1984–85	Div 4	4	46	14	5	27	53	74	47	23rd	R2	R1	R1			(England) Ray Train	54	(England) Ian Benjamin	19	1,826
1985–86	Div 4	4	46	18	10	18	79	58	64	8th	R1	R2	AQF			(England) Ian Benjamin	54	(England) Ian Benjamin	26	2,384
1986–87	Div 4 ↑	4	46	30	9	7	103	53	99	1st	R3	R1	R1			Three Players	54	(England) Richard Hill	33	6,316
1987–88	Div 3	3	46	18	19	9	70	51	73	6th	R2	R2	Grp			(England) Peter Gleasure (England) Russ Wilcox	54	(England) Trevor Morley	16	5,514
1988–89	Div 3	3	46	16	6	24	66	76	54	20th	R1	R2	AQF			(England) Peter Gleasure	55	(England) Tony Adcock	20	3,919
1989–90	Div 3 ↓	3	46	11	14	21	51	68	47	22nd	R4	R1	R1			(England) Peter Gleasure (England) Russ Wilcox	56	(England) Bobby Barnes	20	3,190
1990–91	Div 4	4	46	18	13	15	57	58	67	10th	R2	R2	R1			(England) Steve Terry	56	(England) Bobby Barnes	16	3,710
1991–92	Div 4	4	42	11	13	18	46	57	46	16th	R1	R1	R1			(England) Jason Burnham	46	(England) Tony Adcock	9	2,789
1992–93	Div 3	4	42	11	8	23	48	74	41	20th	R3	R1	AQF			(England) Barry Richardson (England) Steve Terry	52	(England) Steve Brown	12	3,139
1993–94	Div 3	4	42	9	11	22	44	66	38	22nd	R1	R1	R2			(England) Steve Terry	45	(England) Martin Aldridge	11	3,454
1994–95	Div 3	4	42	10	14	18	45	67	44	17th	R1	R1	R2			(England) Ian Sampson	48	(England) Neil Grayson	10	5,085
1995–96	Div 3	4	46	18	13	15	51	44	67	11th	R2	R1	AQF			(England) Ray Warburton	52	(England) Jason White	16	4,878
1996–97	Div 3 ↑	4	46	20	12	14	67	44	72	4th	R1	R2	ASF	League play-offs	W	(England) Ian Clarkson (England) Andy Woodman	56	(England) Neil Grayson	12	4,825
1997–98	Div 2	3	46	18	17	11	52	37	71	4th	R3	R1	AQF	League play-offs	RU	(England) John Frain	58	(Australia) David Seal	14	6,389
1998–99	Div 2 ↓	3	46	10	18	18	43	57	48	22nd	R2	R3	R2			(England) John Frain	48	(Canada) Carlo Corazzin	17	6,068
1999–2000	Div 3 ↑	4	46	25	7	14	63	45	82	3rd	R1	R1	R2			(England) Duncan Spedding	49	(Canada) Carlo Corazzin	15	5,459
2000–01	Div 2	3	46	15	12	19	46	59	57	18th	R2	R1	R1			(England) Jamie Forrester	47	(England) Jamie Forrester	19	5,654
2001–02	Div 2	3	46	14	7	25	54	79	49	20th	R2	R2	R2			(England) Jamie Forrester	48	(England) Jamie Forrester	18	5,253
2002–03	Div 2 ↓	3	46	10	9	27	40	79	39	24th	R2	R1	R2			(England) Paul Harsley	51	(England) Marco Gabbiadini	14	5,211
2003–04	Div 3	4	46	22	9	15	58	51	75	6th	R4	R2	ASF	League play-offs	SF	(England) Martin Smith	56	(England) Martin Smith	15	5,306
2004–05	Lge 2	4	46	20	12	14	62	51	72	7th	R3	R2	AQF	League play-offs	SF	(England) Chris Willmott	54	(England) Scott McGleish	17	5,927
2005–06	Lge 2 ↑	4	46	22	17	7	63	37	83	2nd	R3	R2	R2			(England) Lee Harper	50	(England) Scott McGleish	24	5,935
2006–07	Lge 1	3	46	15	14	17	48	51	59	14th	R2	R1	R1			(Northern Ireland) Andy Kirk	48	(England) Scott McGleish	13	5,573
2007–08	Lge 1	3	46	17	15	14	60	55	66	9th	R2	R2	R1			(England) Mark Bunn	52	(Denmark) Poul Hübertz	13	5,409
2008–09	Lge 1 ↓	3	46	12	13	21	61	65	49	21st	R1	R3	R1			(England) Andy Holt	50	(England) Adebayo Akinfenwa	15	5,200
2009–10	Lge 2	4	46	18	13	15	62	53	67	11th	R2	R1	AQF			(England) Ryan Gilligan	48	(England) Adebayo Akinfenwa	17	4,427
2010–11	Lge 2	4	46	11	19	16	63	71	52	16th	R2	R4	R1			(England) Michael Jacobs	48	(England) Leon McKenzie	10	4,605
2011–12	Lge 2	4	46	12	12	22	56	79	48	20th	R1	R2	R1			(England) Michael Jacobs	50	(England) Adebayo Akinfenwa	18	4,809
2012–13	Lge 2	4	46	21	10	15	64	55	73	6th	R1	R2	AQF	League play-offs	RU	(England) Ben Tozer	56	(England) Adebayo Akinfenwa	17	4,785
2013–14	Lge 2	4	46	13	14	19	42	57	53	21st	R2	R1	R1			(England) Matt Duke	50	(England) Darren Carter (England) Luke Norris	5	4,548
2014–15	Lge 2	4	46	18	7	21	67	62	61	12th	R1	R2	AQF			(England) Lee Collins	43	(England) Marc Richards	18	4,599
2015–16	Lge 2 ↑	4	46	29	12	5	82	46	99	1st	R3	R2	R2			(Northern Ireland) David Buchanan	54	(England) Marc Richards	18	5,279
2016–17	Lge 1	3	46	14	11	21	60	73	53	16th	R2	R3	Grp			(Northern Ireland) David Buchanan	53	(England) Marc Richards	13	6,245
2017–18	Lge 1 ↓	3	46	12	11	23	44	77	47	22nd	R1	R1	R2			(Wales) Ash Taylor	52	(England) Chris Long	9	5,830
2018–19	Lge 2	4	46	14	19	13	64	63	61	15th	R1	R1	R3			(Wales) David Cornell	48	(England) Andy Williams	12	5,100
2019–20	Lge 2 ↑	4	37	17	7	13	54	40	1.57	7th	R4	R1	R2	League play-offs	W	(England) Sam Hoskins	47	(England) Sam Hoskins	12	5,101
2020–21	Lge 1 ↓	3	46	11	12	23	41	67	45	22nd	R1	R2	R3			(England) Sam Hoskins	49	(England) Ryan Watson	9	n/a
2021–22	Lge 2	4	46	23	11	12	60	38	80	4th	R1	R2	Grp	League play-offs	SF	(England) Fraser Horsfall	53	(England) Sam Hoskins	13	5,366
2022–23	Lge 2 ↑	4	46	23	14	9	62	42	83	3rd	R1	R1	Grp			(England) Mitch Pinnock	48	(England) Sam Hoskins	22	5,920
2023–24	Lge 1	3	46	17	9	20	57	66	60	14th	R1	R1	Grp			(Scotland) Marc Leonard	49	(England) Sam Hoskins	15	6,841
2024–25	Lge 1	3	46	12	15	19	48	66	51	19th	R1	R1	R2			(England) Mitch Pinnock	51	(Northern Ireland) Cameron McGeehan	10	6,638
2025–26	Lge 1 ↓	3	46	9	8	29	39	74	35	24th	R1	R1	SF			(Wales) Terry Taylor	49	(England) Tom Eaves	10	6,542
2026–27	Lge 2	4									R1	R1								

== Key ==
Key to league record:

- P = Played
- W = Games won
- D = Games drawn
- L = Games lost
- F = Goals for
- A = Goals against
- Pts = Points
- Pos = Final position

Key to divisions:

- Div 1 = Football League First Division
- Div 2 = Football League Second Division
- Div 3 = Football League Third Division
- Div 4 = Football League Fourth Division
- Lge 1 = Football League One
- Lge 2 = Football League Two
- SL = Southern League
- ML = Midland League
- NL = Northamptonshire League

Key to rounds:

- DNE = Did not enter
- PR = Preliminary round
- 1QR = First Qualifying Round
- 2QR = Second Qualifying Round
- 3QR = Third Qualifying Round
- 4QR = Fourth Qualifying Round
- 5QR = Fifth Qualifying Round
- 6QR = Sixth Qualifying Round
- R1 = Round 1
- R2 = Round 2
- R3 = Round 3
- R4 = Round 4
- R5 = Round 5
- Grp = Group stage
- QF = Quarter-finals
- AQF = Area Quarter-finals
- SF = Semi-finals
- ASF = Area Semi-finals
- RU = Runners-up
- W = Winners

Champions	Runners-up	Play-offs	Promoted	Relegated	Semi-finals

Top scorers shown in bold are Northampton Town who were also top scorers in their division that season.
