= List of Northampton Town F.C. records and statistics =

This page details Northampton Town Football Club records.

== Honours ==
=== League ===
- English 2nd Tier

Runners-up: 1964–65

- English 3rd Tier

Champions: 1962–63
Runners-up: 1927–28, 1949–50

- English 4th Tier

Champions: 1986–87, 2015–16
Runners-up: 1975–76, 2005–06
Promoted: 1960–61, 1999–2000, 2022–23
Promoted as Play-off Winners: 1996–97, 2019–20

- Southern Football League

Champions: 1908–09
Runners-up: 1910–11

=== Cups ===
- Charity Shield

Runners-up: 1909

- FA Cup:

Best: Round 5 1969–70

- Football League Cup:

Best: Quarter-final 1964–65, 1966–67

- Football League Trophy:

Best: Area Semi-final 1996–97, 2003–04

== Team records ==
- Record win:

11-1 v Southend United (H), Southern League 1909/10

- Record defeat:

0-11 v Southampton (A), Southern League, 1901/02

- Most points gained in a season:

99 (1986/87, Football League Fourth Division), (2015/16, Football League Two)

- Fewest points gained in a season:

19 (1906/07, Southern League)

- Most goals scored in a season:

109: 1952-53 (Football League Third Division South) and 1962-63 (Football League Third Division)

== Appearances ==
=== Most appearances ===
- **All-time most appearances** (Does not include wartime appearances)

Current players in bold.

#	Nat.	Name	Period	League	FA Cup	League Cup	Other	Total
1	(England)	Tommy Fowler	1946–1961	521	31	0	0	552
2	(England)	**Sam Hoskins**	2015–	423	17	14	24	478
3	(England)	Ian Sampson	1994–2004	390	19	17	23	449
4	(England)	Peter Gleasure	1982–1991	344	25	25	18	412
5	(England)	Edwin Freeman	1905–1920	341	22	0	1	364
6	(England)	Willie Watson	1920–1929	326	26	0	0	352
6	(Scotland)	Joe Kiernan	1963–1972	308	19	25	0	352
8	(England)	Phil Chard	1985–1988, 1989–1994	278	19	18	16	331
9	(Wales)	Lloyd Davies	1907–1920	311	18	0	1	330
10	(England)	Len Hammond	1924–1932	301	25	0	0	326
11	(England)	Roly Mills	1954–1963	305	13	6	0	324
12	(England)	Jack English	1947–1959	302	20	0	0	322
13	(England)	Ron Patterson	1952–1961	300	17	0	0	317
14	(England)	Tommy Wells	1926–1934	277	25	0	3	305
15	(Wales)	Barry Tucker	1971–1977, 1982–1983	277	12	13	0	302
16	(England)	Billy Pease	1919–1925	278	21	0	0	299
17	(England)	Barry Lines	1960–1969	266	10	18	0	294
18	(England)	Graham Felton	1966–1975	254	19	13	0	286
19	(Scotland)	Jock Manning	1908–1920	264	18	0	1	283
20	(England)	William Lockett	1914–1926	262	20	0	0	282

- Most appearances – **552** by Tommy Fowler (1946–1961)
- Most league appearances – **521** by Tommy Fowler (1946–1961)
- Most appearances in the first tier (Premier League and predecessors) – **42** by Joe Kiernan
- Most appearances in the second tier (Championship and predecessors) – **111** by Terry Branston
- Most appearances in the third tier (League One and predecessors) – **138** by Peter Gleasure
- Most appearances in the fourth tier (League Two and predecessors) – **521** by Tommy Fowler
- Most FA Cup appearances – **31** by Tommy Fowler
- Most League Cup appearances – **25** by Joe Kiernan and Peter Gleasure
- Most appearances in a single season – **58** by John Frain (45 in FL, 3 PO, 5 FAC, 2 FLC, 3 AWS – 1997–98)

=== Youngest and oldest appearances ===
- Longest Spell at club – **15 years** by Tommy Fowler (1946–1961)
- Youngest first-team player – **15 years 336 days** by Josh Tomlinson (v Brighton & Hove Albion U23's, 3 November 2021)
- Oldest first-team player – **43 years 42 days** by Lloyd Davies (v Exeter City, 3 April 1920)

== Goalscorers ==
=== Top goalscorers ===
- **Top 20 all-time top goalscorers** (Does not include wartime appearances.)

Current players in bold.

#	Nat.	Name	Period	League	FA Cup	League Cup	Other	Total	Apps	Goal Ratio
1	(England)	Jack English	1947–1959	135	8	0	0	143	322	0.44
2	(England)	Ted Bowen	1927–1931	114	6	0	0	120	172	0.69
3	(England)	William Lockett	1914–1926	100	9	0	0	109	282	0.39
4	(England)	**Sam Hoskins**	2015–	95	4	2	4	105	478	0.22
5	(England)	Frank Large	1962–1963; 1966–1967; 1969–1972	88	5	3	0	96	250	0.38
6	(England)	Albert Dawes	1929–1933	82	12	0	0	94	175	0.54
7	(England)	Albert Lewis	1908–1913	85	5	0	0	90	179	0.50
8	(England)	Tommy Fowler	1946–1961	84	4	0	0	88	552	0.15
9	(England)	Ralph Hoten	1924–1930	75	9	0	0	84	213	0.39
9	(England)	Tommy Wells	1926–1934	73	10	0	1	84	305	0.28
11	(England)	Don Martin	1962–1968, 1976–1978	69	1	11	0	81	252	0.32
12	(England)	Fred Lessons	1907–1915	75	4	0	0	79	249	0.31
13	(England)	Adebayo Akinfenwa	2007–2010, 2011–2013	71	0	2	1	74	188	0.39
14	(England)	Harry King	1911–1914	68	2	0	0	70	105	0.66
15	(England)	Alan Woan	1956–1959	68	1	0	0	69	123	0.56
15	(England)	Ian Benjamin	1984–1987	59	3	2	5	69	180	0.38
17	(England)	Marc Richards	2003–2005, 2014–2018	54	5	1	3	63	210	0.30
18	(England)	John Fairbrother	1968–1971	56	4	2	0	62	164	0.37
19	(England)	Paul Stratford	1972–1978	59	1	1	0	61	188	0.32
20	(England)	Fred Ramscar	1951–1955	55	4	0	0	59	146	0.40

- Most goals – **143** by Jack English
- Most league goals – **135** by Jack English
- Most goals in the first tier (Premier League and predecessors) – **9** by Bobby Brown
- Most goals in the second tier (Championship and predecessors) – **33** by Don Martin
- Most goals in the third tier (League One and predecessors) – **50** by Cliff Holton
- Most goals in the fourth tier (League Two and predecessors) – **135** by Jack English
- Most FA Cup goals – **12** by Albert Dawes
- Most League Cup goals – **11** by Don Martin

=== Top goalscorers in individual matches and seasons ===
- Most goals scored in a single season – **39** by Cliff Holton (1961–62)
- Most goals scored in a season in the first tier (Premier League and predecessors) – **9** by Bobby Brown (1965–66)
- Most goals scored in a season in the second tier (Championship and predecessors) – **13** by Bobby Brown, Don Martin, Tommy Robson (1964–65) and Don Martin (1966–67)
- Most goals scored in a season in the third tier (League One and predecessors) – **36** by Cliff Holton (1961–62)
- Most goals scored in a season in the fourth tier (League Two and predecessors) – **32** by Alan Woan (1958–59)
- Most goals scored in one game – **5** by Ralph Hoten (v Crystal Palace, 27 October 1928) and Albert Dawes (v Lloyds Bank, 26 November 1932)
- Most goals scored on debut – **3** by Billy Clarke (v Crewe Alexandra, 24 January 2009)

=== Other goalscoring records ===
- Most consecutive games scored in – by –
- Most consecutive league games scored in **9** by Cliff Holton (3 October 1961 – 18 November 1961)
- Most hat-tricks (or better) – **7** by Albert Dawes and Albert Lewis
- Most penalties scored – by
- Youngest goalscorer – **16 years 321 days** by Josh Tomlinson (v Arsenal U21s, 18 October 2022)
- Oldest goalscorer – **39 years 195 days** by Tommy Crilly (v Reading, 30 January 1935)
- Youngest to score hat-trick – **19 Years 3 days** by Paul Stratford (v Workington, 1 October 1974)
- Oldest to score hat-trick – **34 Years 347 days** by Tommy Fowler (v Gillingham, 27 December 1958)
- Quickest goal –
- Quickest hat-trick – **4 minutes** by Neil Grayson (v Hartlepool United, 25 January 1997)

== Player records ==
- Most Clean Sheets in a season:

Lee Harper and Mark Bunn, 25 (23 in league), 2005–06

- Most Capped Player:

Lloyd Davies - 12 caps for Wales

== Home Attendances ==
Only competitive first-team matches are considered.

- Highest attendance at the County Ground:
  24,523 v Fulham, First Division, 23 April 1966
- Highest attendance at Sixfields Stadium:
  8,029 v Luton Town, EFL League One, 25 October 2025

== Transfers ==
- Transfer Fee Paid:

£165,000 to Oldham Athletic for Josh Low on 30 July 2003

- Transfer Fee Received:

£1,000,000 (+ add ons) from Brentford for Charlie Goode on 19 August 2020
