= 1958–59 Northampton Town F.C. season =

Northampton Town
1958–59 season
- Chairman: Walter Penn
- Manager: Dave Smith
- Stadium: County Ground
- Division Four: 8th
- FA Cup: Second round
- Top goalscorer: League: Alan Woan (32); All: Alan Woan (32)
- Highest home attendance: 14,365 vs Coventry City
- Lowest home attendance: 3,450 vs Carlisle United
- Average home league attendance: 8,090

The 1958–59 season was Northampton Town's 62nd season in their history and the first season in the fourth tier of English football, the Fourth Division, after a revamping of the league pyramid. Alongside competing in Division Four, the club also participated in the FA Cup.

== Players ==
As of match played 30 April 1959.

Name	Position	Nat.	Place of Birth	Date of Birth (Age)	Apps	Goals	Previous club	Date signed	Fee
Goalkeepers
Tony Brewer	GK	(England)	Edmonton	20 May 1932 (aged 26)	31	0	Millwall	August 1958	
Reg Elvy	GK	(England)	Leeds	25 November 1920 (aged 38)	72	0	Blackburn Rovers	Summer 1956	£350
Full backs
Jack Bannister	RB	(England)	Chesterfield	1 February 1929 (aged 30)	25	0	Shrewsbury Town	Summer 1958	
Tony Claypole	RB	(England)	Weldon	13 February 1937 (aged 22)	38	1	Apprentice	August 1956	N/A
Geoff Coleman	RB	(England)	Bedworth	13 May 1936 (aged 22)	18	0	Bedworth Town	Summer 1955	
Ralph Phillips	RB	(England)	Hetton-le-Hole	9 August 1933 (aged 25)	10	1	Middlesbrough	November 1958	
Ron Patterson (c)	LB	(England)	Gateshead	30 October 1929 (aged 29)	267	5	Middlesbrough	Summer 1952	
Half backs
Ben Collins	CH	(England)	Kislingbury	9 March 1928 (aged 31)	224	0	Apprentice	Summer 1948	N/A
Colin Gale	CH	(Wales)	Pontypridd	31 August 1932 (aged 26)	143	1	Cardiff City	March 1956	£1,500
Roly Mills	WH	(England)	Daventry	22 June 1933 (aged 25)	149	21	Apprentice	May 1951	N/A
John Smith	WH	(England)	Leicester	4 September 1928 (aged 30)	185	9	Apprentice	May 1949	N/A
Inside/Outside forwards
Jack English	OF	(England)	South Shields	19 March 1923 (aged 36)	316	140	Apprentice	Summer 1947	N/A
Tommy Fowler	OF	(England)	Prescot	16 December 1924 (aged 34)	486	81	Everton	March 1945	
Alan Loasby	OF	(England)	Wellingborough	19 March 1937 (aged 22)	2	0	Luton Town	Summer 1958	
Roger Miller	OF	(England)	Northampton	18 August 1938 (aged 20)	4	1	Apprentice	Summer 1956	N/A
Béla Oláh	OF	(Hungary)	Hungary	8 June 1938 (aged 20)	2	0	Bedford Town	December 1958	
Kevin Baron	IF	(England)	Preston	19 July 1926 (aged 32)	27	4	Southend United	September 1958	
Brian Kirkup	IF	(England)	Slough	16 April 1932 (aged 27)	19	7	Reading	Summer 1958	
Bobby Tebbutt	IF	(England)	Irchester	10 November 1934 (aged 24)	45	17	Apprentice	October 1956	N/A
Alan Woan	IF	(England)	Liverpool	8 February 1931 (aged 28)	109	63	Norwich City	Summer 1956	
Centre forwards
Derek Leck	CF	(England)	Deal	8 February 1937 (aged 22)	14	4	Millwall	June 1958	
Ollie Norris	CF	(Northern Ireland)	Derry	1 April 1929 (aged 30)	15	1	Bournemouth & B A	September 1958	

== Competitions ==
=== Division Four ===
==== League table ====
Pos	Team	Pld	W	D	L	GF	GA	GAv	Pts
6	Walsall	46	21	10	15	95	64	1.484	52
7	Crystal Palace	46	20	12	14	90	71	1.268	52
8	Northampton Town	46	21	9	16	85	78	1.090	51
9	Millwall	46	20	10	16	76	69	1.101	50
10	Carlisle United	46	19	12	15	62	65	0.954	50

Source: rsssf.com

==== League position by match ====
Round	1	2	3	4	5	6	7	8	9	10	11	12	13	14	15	16	17	18	19	20	21	22	23	24	25	26	27	28	29	30	31	32	33	34	35	36	37	38	39	40	41	42	43	44	45	46
Ground	A	H	H	A	A	A	H	A	H	H	A	A	H	H	A	H	A	H	H	A	A	H	A	H	A	A	H	A	H	A	H	A	H	A	H	A	A	H	H	H	A	H	H	A	A	H
Result	W	W	W	W	W	L	W	L	D	W	D	L	L	D	L	D	D	W	W	L	D	L	L	W	D	L	W	L	W	W	D	W	W	L	L	W	L	W	L	D	W	W	W	L	L	W
Position	2	1	1	1	1	1	1	3	3	2	2	5	7	8	11	11	8	9	6	10	9	10	13	11	12	12	10	13	10	8	8	8	8	8	10	9	9	9	10	10	11	10	9	10	11	8

Source: 11v11.com
A = Away; H = Home; W = Win; D = Draw; L = Loss

==== Matches ====
Win Draw Loss

23 August 1958 1	Port Vale	1–4	Northampton Town	Burslem
15:00 BST	J.Wilkinson		A.Woan 1'; B.Hawkings; B.Kirkup	Stadium: Vale Park; Attendance: 15,018

28 August 1958 2	Northampton Town	3–0	Crewe Alexandra	Northampton
19:30 BST	B.Hawkings; B.Kirkup; A.Woan			Stadium: County Ground; Attendance: 11,916

30 August 1958 3	Northampton Town	3–0	Crystal Palace	Northampton
19:30 BST	T.Fowler; B.Kirkup; A.Woan			Stadium: County Ground; Attendance: 11,288

1 September 1958 4	Crewe Alexandra	1–2	Northampton Town	Crewe
15:00 BST			A.Woan	Stadium: Gresty Road; Attendance: 7,016

6 September 1958 5	Chester	2–3	Northampton Town	Chester
15:00 BST	N.Bullock		T.Fowler; R.Mills; A.Woan	Stadium: Sealand Road; Attendance: 9,723

9 September 1958 6	Carlisle United	2–1	Northampton Town	Carlisle
19:30 BST			A.Woan	Stadium: Brunton Park; Attendance: 11,238

13 September 1958 7	Northampton Town	2–1	Watford	Northampton
15:00 BST	B.Hawkings; R.Mills			Stadium: County Ground; Attendance: 11,106

20 September 1958 8	Hartlepools United	3–0	Northampton Town	Hartlepool
19:30 BST			A.Woan	Stadium: Victoria Park; Attendance: 7,463

25 September 1958 9	Northampton Town	1–1	Workington	Northampton
19:30 BST	K.Baron			Stadium: County Ground; Attendance: 6,487

27 September 1958 10	Northampton Town	3–1	Southport	Northampton
15:00 BST	T.Fowler; A.Woan			Stadium: County Ground; Attendance: 10,999

1 October 1958 11	Workington	3–3	Northampton Town	Workington
19:30 BST			T.Fowler; R.Mills; A.Woan	Stadium: Borough Park; Attendance: 6,613

4 October 1958 12	Torquay United	4–2	Northampton Town	Torquay
15:00 BST			K.Baron; O.Norris	Stadium: Plainmoor; Attendance: 5,399

9 October 1958 13	Northampton Town	1–2	York City	Northampton
19:30 GMT	K.Baron			Stadium: County Ground; Attendance: 5,826

11 October 1958 14	Northampton Town	1–1	Exeter City	Northampton
15:00 GMT	A.Woan			Stadium: County Ground; Attendance: 10,077

18 October 1958 15	Coventry City	2–0	Northampton Town	Coventry
15:00 GMT	Straw			Stadium: Highfield Road; Attendance: 22,305

25 October 1958 16	Northampton Town	3–3	Shrewsbury Town	Northampton
15:00 GMT	B.Tebbutt; A.Woan			Stadium: County Ground; Attendance: 9,897

1 November 1958 17	Darlington	2–2	Northampton Town	Darlington
15:00 GMT			T.Fowler; B.Hawkings	Stadium: Feethams; Attendance: 5,579

8 November 1958 18	Northampton Town	3–2	Walsall	Northampton
15:00 GMT	B.Tebbutt; A.Woan; B.Guttridge o.g.'			Stadium: County Ground; Attendance: 11,858

22 November 1958 19	Northampton Town	1–0	Aldershot	Northampton
15:00 GMT	B.Kirkup			Stadium: County Ground; Attendance: 7,598

29 November 1958 20	Gateshead	4–1	Northampton Town	Gateshead
15:00 GMT			B.Kirkup	Stadium: Redheugh Park; Attendance: 2,870

13 December 1958 21	Barrow	2–2	Northampton Town	Barrow-in-Furness
15:00 GMT			R.Mills; B.Tebbutt	Stadium: Holker Street; Attendance: 4,209

20 December 1958 22	Northampton Town	2–4	Port Vale	Northampton
15:00 GMT	T.Fowler		H.Poole; N.Kinsey; G.Barnett	Stadium: County Ground; Attendance: 6,907

26 December 1958 23	Gillingham	4–1	Northampton Town	Gillingham
15:00 GMT			R.Mills	Stadium: Priestfield Stadium; Attendance: 6,947

27 December 1958 24	Northampton Town	4–2	Gillingham	Northampton
15:00 GMT	T.Fowler; A.Woan			Stadium: County Ground; Attendance: 9,538

3 January 1959 25	Crystal Palace	1–1	Northampton Town	Selhurst, London
15:00 GMT			B.Hawkings	Stadium: Selhurst Park; Attendance: 17,162

10 January 1959 26	Millwall	3–0	Northampton Town	New Cross, London
15:00 GMT				Stadium: The Old Den; Attendance: 11,388

24 January 1959 27	Northampton Town	2–1	Oldham Athletic	Northampton
15:00 GMT	T.Claypole; A.Woan			Stadium: County Ground; Attendance: 7,168

31 January 1959 28	Watford	3–1	Northampton Town	Watford
15:00 GMT			A.Woan	Stadium: Vicarage Road; Attendance: 6,200

7 February 1959 29	Northampton Town	2–1	Hartlepools United	Northampton
15:00 GMT	K.Baron; A.Woan			Stadium: County Ground; Attendance: 6,055

14 February 1959 30	Southport	1–2	Northampton Town	Southport
15:00 GMT			A.Woan	Stadium: Haig Avenue; Attendance: 3,630

21 February 1959 31	Northampton Town	1–1	Torquay United	Northampton
15:00 GMT	A.Woan			Stadium: County Ground; Attendance: 6,329

28 February 1959 32	Exeter City	3–4	Northampton Town	Exeter
15:00 GMT			J.English; T.Fowler; D.Leck; A.Woan	Stadium: St James Park; Attendance: 9,870

7 March 1959 33	Northampton Town	4–0	Coventry City	Northampton
15:00 GMT	T.Fowler; D.Leck; A.Woan			Stadium: County Ground; Attendance: 14,365

14 March 1959 34	Shrewsbury Town	4–0	Northampton Town	Shrewsbury
15:00 GMT				Stadium: Gay Meadow; Attendance: 7,227

21 March 1959 35	Northampton Town	1–3	Darlington	Northampton
15:00 GMT	A.Woan			Stadium: County Ground; Attendance: 6,399

27 March 1959 36	Bradford (Park Avenue)	1–2	Northampton Town	Bradford
15:00 GMT			J.O'Neil; A.Woan	Stadium: Park Avenue; Attendance: 5,898

28 March 1959 37	Walsall	2–1	Northampton Town	Walsall
15:00 GMT			J.English	Stadium: Fellows Park; Attendance: 5,991

31 March 1959 38	Northampton Town	4–1	Bradford (Park Avenue)	Northampton
19:30 GMT	J.English; T.Fowler; D.Leck; A.Woan			Stadium: County Ground; Attendance: 7,544

4 April 1959 39	Northampton Town	0–1	Millwall	Northampton
15:00 GMT				Stadium: County Ground; Attendance: 7,284

6 April 1959 40	Northampton Town	0–0	Carlisle United	Northampton
15:00 GMT				Stadium: County Ground; Attendance: 3,450

11 April 1959 41	Aldershot	1–3	Northampton Town	Aldershot
15:00 GMT			D.Leck; R.Phillips; A.Woan	Stadium: Recreation Ground; Attendance: 2,567

13 April 1959 42	Northampton Town	4–0	Chester	Northampton
19:30 GMT	T.Fowler; A.Woan			Stadium: County Ground; Attendance: 3,865

18 April 1959 43	Northampton Town	1–0	Gateshead	Northampton
15:00 GMT	R.Mills			Stadium: County Ground; Attendance: 5,799

20 April 1959 44	York City	2–1	Northampton Town	York
19:30 BST			A.Woan	Stadium: Bootham Crescent; Attendance: 9,123

25 April 1959 45	Oldham Athletic	2–1	Northampton Town	Oldham
15:00 BST			T.Fowler	Stadium: Boundary Park; Attendance: 2,671

30 April 1959 46	Northampton Town	2–0	Barrow	Northampton
19:30 BST	J.English; A.Woan			Stadium: County Ground; Attendance: 4,324

=== FA Cup ===
15 November 1958 First round	Northampton Town	2–0	Wycombe Wanderers	Northampton
15:00 GMT	T.Fowler; B.Kirkup			Stadium: County Ground; Attendance: 12,934

6 December 1958 Second round	Tooting & Mitcham United	2–1	Northampton Town	Mitcham, London
15:00 GMT			B.Kirkup	Stadium: Sandy Lane; Attendance: 10,203

=== Appearances and goals ===
Pos	Player	Division Four		FA Cup		Total	
Pos	Player	Starts	Goals	Starts	Goals	Starts	Goals
GK	Tony Brewer	31	–	–	–	31	–
GK	Reg Elvy	15	–	2	–	17	–
FB	Jack Bannister	24	–	1	–	25	–
FB	Tony Claypole	26	1	1	–	27	1
FB	Geoff Coleman	1	–	–	–	1	–
FB	Ron Patterson	38	–	2	–	40	–
FB	Ralph Phillips	10	1	–	–	10	1
HB	Ben Collins	10	–	1	–	11	–
HB	Colin Gale	36	–	1	–	37	–
HB	Roly Mills	42	6	2	–	44	6
HB	Joe O'Neil	22	1	–	–	22	1
HB	John Smith	23	–	1	–	24	–
OF	Jack English	13	4	1	–	14	4
OF	Tommy Fowler	45	15	2	1	47	16
OF	Alan Loasby	2	–	–	–	2	–
OF	Roger Miller	2	–	–	–	2	–
OF	Béla Oláh	2	–	–	–	2	–
IF	Kevin Baron	25	4	2	–	27	4
IF	Brian Kirkup	17	5	2	2	19	7
IF	Bobby Tebbutt	14	4	1	–	15	4
IF	Alan Woan	42	32	1	–	43	32
CF	Derek Leck	14	5	–	–	14	5
CF	Ollie Norris	14	1	1	–	15	1
Players who left before end of season:
HB	Ray Yeoman	17	–	–	–	17	–
CF	Barry Hawkings	21	5	1	–	22	5
