= Ralph Hoten =

English footballer

Personal information
- Full name: Ralph Vincent Hoten
- Date of birth: 27 December 1896
- Place of birth: Pinxton, England
- Date of death: 1978
- Place of death: Wellingborough, England
- Position: Inside forward

Youth career
- Lady Bay
- Pinxton Colliery

Senior career*
Years	Team	Apps	(Gls)
1919–1921	Notts County	4	(1)
1921–1923	Portsmouth	40	
1923–1924	Luton Town	60	(13)
1924–1930	Northampton Town	197	(75)
1930–1931	Queens Park Rangers	9	(4)
- * Club domestic league appearances and goals

Ralph Vincent Hoten (27 December 1896 – 1978) was an English professional footballer who played as an inside-forward in the English Football League.

== Career ==
Born in Pinxton, Hoten joined his local First Division club Notts County in 1919, after playing for amateur teams Lady Bay FC and Pinxton Colliery either side of the Great War. He made his Football League debut at Bradford Park Avenue in February 1920, but failed to make his mark in Nottingham, moving south to Portsmouth where he established himself in the league, scoring nine goals in his first season before losing his place early the following season.

=== Luton Town (1923–1924) ===
In March 1923, Hoten moved to Luton Town in a swap deal involving Tom Parker. He soon became a favourite at Kenilworth Road as a 'fast, clever and strongly built' Inside forward. He scored on his debut in a win over Southend United and before the end of the season scored a hat-trick in a win over Exeter City.

=== Northampton Town (1924–1930) ===
Hoten signed for Northampton Town in December 1924 alongside fellow Luton Town teammate Ernie Cockle. They were signed by manager Bob Hewison due to the injury of record goalscorer at the time, William Lockett. After a couple of frugal seasons, it was only after the changes to the offside law that Hoten became a regular goalscorer. He scored a hat-trick in an FA Cup win over Leyton in November 1927 and scored double figures for the first time in his career as the team finished runners-up in the 1927–28 season, missing out on promotion. The following season, Hoten scored 31 goals, but Northampton failed to improve on their finish position, placing third. However Hoten did break a club record for scoring 5 goals in an 8-1 victory over Crystal Palace in October 1928, a feat later equalled by Albert Dawes in an FA Cup tie.

In the 1929-30 season, Hoten scored 22 goals including hat-tricks against Margate in the FA Cup, and previous club Luton Town as The Cobblers again missed out on promotion finishing fourth. In the summer of 1930, he was sold to Queens Park Rangers before retiring from football soon after through injury.

== Post-football ==
Hoten became a coffin maker and later, a coal merchant in Wellingborough, before dying in 1978.
