= Ernie Cockle =

English footballer

Personal information
- Full name: Ernest Samuel Cockle
- Date of birth: 12 September 1896
- Place of birth: East Ham, London, England
- Date of death: 1966
- Place of death: Thornton Heath, London, England
- Position: Centre-forward

Senior career*
Years	Team	Apps	(Gls)
1920–1921	Clapton Orient	22	(4)
1921–1922	Margate Town		
1922–1923	Maidstone United		
1923–1924	Arsenal	0	(0)
1924	Luton Town	7	(1)
1924–1927	Northampton Town	97	(46)
1927–1930	Wigan Borough	78	(16)
1930–1931	Guildford City		
1931	Wigan Borough	6	(0)
1931–	Chorley		
- * Club domestic league appearances and goals

Ernest 'Ernie' Samuel Cockle (12 September 1896 – 1966) was an English professional footballer who played as a centre-forward in the English Football League.

== Career ==
Born in East Ham, Cockle joined his local Second Division club Clapton Orient after the Great War. After dipping into non-league with Margate Town and Maidstone United, Cockle signed for Arsenal at the start of the 1923 season, but failed to make an appearance despite being a prolific goalscorer for the reserves. In search of first team football, he signed for Luton Town in May 1924.

=== Northampton Town (1924–1927) ===
Cockle signed for Northampton Town in December 1924 alongside fellow Luton Town teammate Ralph Hoten. They were signed by manager Bob Hewison due to the injury of record goalscorer at the time, William Lockett. He played every game in the 1925–26 season, which started in great fashion, scoring all 4 goals in a 4–3 win against Brentford at Griffin Park. He also ended up the leading league goalscorer, however Les Robinson's six FA Cup strikes left him the leading goalscorer in all matches. Cockle continued as a regular goalscorer, including leading the overall scoring charts the following year, but lost his place from the start of the 1927–28 season before transferring to Wigan Borough in June 1928.
