= Josh Tomlinson =

English footballer (born 2005)

Personal information
- Full name: Joshua Geoffrey Tomlinson
- Date of birth: 1 December 2005 (age 20)
- Place of birth: Kettering, England
- Position: Defender

Team information
- Current team: Brackley Town

Youth career
- Northampton Town

Senior career*
| Years | Team | Apps | (Gls) |
| 2021–2026 | Northampton Town | 0 | (0) |
| 2022–2023 | → Harborough Town (loan) | 4 | (0) |
| 2023 | → Barwell (loan) | 6 | (0) |
| 2023–2024 | → St Ives Town (loan) | 26 | (3) |
| 2024–2025 | → Needham Market (loan) | 27 | (0) |
| 2025 | → Bedford Town (loan) | 8 | (0) |
| 2025–2026 | → Leamington (loan) | 6 | (0) |
| 2026 | → Bedford Town (loan) | 4 | (0) |
| 2026– | Brackley Town | 0 | (0) |
- * Club domestic league appearances and goals as of 16:29, 26 June 2026 (UTC)

Joshua Geoffrey Tomlinson (born 1 December 2005) is an English professional footballer who plays as a defender for National League North club Brackley Town.

== Career ==
=== Northampton Town ===
Tomlinson made his first-team debut for Northampton Town aged 15 years and 336 days, making him the youngest player in the club's history when he played in a centre-back partnership with Dominic Revan in a 2–1 defeat to Brighton & Hove Albion U21 in an EFL Trophy match at Sixfields Stadium; manager Jon Brady said that "he hardly put a foot wrong, his distribution was good and he read the game well". On 18 October 2022, he became the youngest goalscorer in the club's history when he scored in a 3–1 home defeat to Arsenal U21 at the age of 16 years and 321 days. He signed his first professional contract the following month, having also played a record amount of times for the under-18 team after becoming the youngest player to represent them at the age of thirteen. On 24 December 2022, he joined Northern Premier League Midlands side Harborough Town on a one-month loan. He then moved on to Barwell on a similar basis the following month.

On 6 May 2025, Northampton announced the player had been offered a new contract.

On 9 August 2025, Tomlinson joined newly promoted National League North club Bedford Town on loan.

He was released by Northampton Town upon the expiry of his contract at the end of the 2025–26 season.

=== Non-League ===
On 25 June 2026, Tomlinson joined Brackley Town following their relegation back to the National League North. Tomlinson scored on his league debut for Brackley Town, a late header to secure a 2-1 win away at AFC Telford United.

== Career statistics ==
As of match played 17 December 2024

Appearances and goals by club, season and competition
| Club | Season | League | | | FA Cup | | EFL Cup | | Other | | Total | |
| Club | Season | Division | Apps | Goals | Apps | Goals | Apps | Goals | Apps | Goals | Apps | Goals |
|---|---|---|---|---|---|---|---|---|---|---|---|---|
| Northampton Town | 2021–22 | League Two | 0 | 0 | 0 | 0 | 0 | 0 | 1 (Note: Appearance(s) in the EFL Trophy.) | 0 | 1 | 0 |
| Northampton Town | 2022–23 | League Two | 0 | 0 | 0 | 0 | 0 | 0 | 3 | 1 | 3 | 1 |
| Northampton Town | 2023–24 | League One | 0 | 0 | 0 | 0 | 0 | 0 | 1 | 0 | 1 | 0 |
| Northampton Town | 2024–25 | League One | 0 | 0 | 0 | 0 | 0 | 0 | 4 | 0 | 4 | 0 |
| Northampton Town | Total | | 0 | 0 | 0 | 0 | 0 | 0 | 9 | 1 | 9 | 1 |
| Harborough Town (loan) | 2022–23 | NPL Midlands Division | 4 | 0 | 0 | 0 | 0 | 0 | 0 | 0 | 4 | 0 |
| Barwell (loan) | 2022–23 | SPL Division Central | 6 | 0 | 0 | 0 | 0 | 0 | 0 | 0 | 6 | 0 |
| St Ives Town (loan) | 2023–24 | SPL Division Central | 26 | 3 | 0 | 0 | 0 | 0 | 3 (Note: Appearance(s) in FA Trophy) | 0 | 29 | 3 |
| Needham Market (loan) | 2024–24 | National League North | 11 | 0 | 0 | 0 | 0 | 0 | 1 | 0 | 12 | 0 |
| Career total | | | 47 | 3 | 0 | 0 | 0 | 0 | 13 | 1 | 60 | 4 |

== Honours ==
Individual

- EFL League Two Apprentice of the Season: 2022–23
