= Ralph Phillips (footballer) =

English footballer

Personal information
- Full name: Ralph Phillips
- Date of birth: 9 August 1933
- Place of birth: Hetton-le-Hole, England
- Date of death: September 2011 (aged 78)
- Place of death: County Durham,
- Position: Full back

Senior career*
Years	Team	Apps	(Gls)
–	Middlesbrough	0	(0)
1958–1961	Northampton Town	83	(1)
1961–1963	Darlington	29	(3)
- * Club domestic league appearances and goals

Ralph Phillips (9 August 1933 – September 2011) was an English footballer who made 112 appearances in the Football League playing as a full back for Northampton Town and Darlington in the 1950s and 1960s. He began his senior career with Middlesbrough, without representing them in the League.
