= Thomas Jeffs =

English footballer

Personal information
- Full name: Thomas Edmond Jeffs
- Date of birth: 3 August 1900
- Place of birth: Peterborough, England
- Date of death: 1971 (aged 70–71)
- Position: Full-back

Senior career*
Years	Team	Apps	(Gls)
1920–1921	Rugby Town		
1921–1928	Northampton Town	143	(0)
Total		143	(0)
- * Club domestic league appearances and goals

Thomas Edmond Jeffs (3 August 1900 – 1971) was an English footballer who played in the Football League for Northampton Town.
