= George O'Dell =

English footballer

Personal information
- Full name: George William O'Dell
- Date of birth: 16 January 1901
- Place of birth: Hoddesdon, England
- Date of death: 1971 (aged 69–70)
- Position: Wing half

Senior career*
Years	Team	Apps	(Gls)
- St Albans City
1927–1932	Northampton Town	147	(10)
1932–1934	Wigan Athletic	76	(?)
1934–1935	Newport County	24	(0)
Total		247	(10)
- * Club domestic league appearances and goals

George William O'Dell (16 January 1901 – 1971) was an English professional footballer who played as a wing half.

Born in Hoddesdon, Hertfordshire, O'Dell was signed by Northampton Town from St Albans City in 1927. He spent five seasons at Northampton, making 147 Football League appearances for the club. He joined newly formed Wigan Athletic in 1932, and played in the club's first ever league game. He made 76 Cheshire League appearances in two seasons at the club before returning to the Football League with Newport County in 1934.
