= Ollie Norris (footballer) =

Northern Irish footballer

Personal information
- Full name: Oliver Patrick Norris
- Date of birth: 1 April 1929
- Place of birth: Derry, Northern Ireland
- Date of death: 14 June 2011 (aged 82)
- Place of death: Melbourne, Australia
- Position: Forward

Youth career
- 1946: Middlesbrough

Senior career*
Years	Team	Apps	(Gls)
1947–1954	Middlesbrough	12	(2)
1954–1955	Worcester City		
1955–1958	Bournemouth & Boscombe	96	(34)
1958–1959	Northampton Town	14	(1)
1959–1960	Gloucester City		
1960	Ashford Town	17	(8)
1961	Rochdale	2	(1)
1961	Ashford Town	12	(2)
1961	Sligo Rovers		
1962–1964	Ringwood-Wilhelmina	30	(10)
1964	Croatia		
1965	Hakoah		

Managerial career
- 1959–1960: Gloucester City
- 1962–1964: Ringwood-Wilhelmina
- 1965–1966: Hakoah
- * Club domestic league appearances and goals

Oliver Patrick Norris (1 April 1929 – 14 June 2011) was a Northern Irish professional footballer who played as a forward. Between 1951 and 1961 he made 124 appearances, scoring 38 goals in The Football League for Middlesbrough, Bournemouth & Boscombe Athletic, Northampton Town and Rochdale.

Norris joined Middlesbrough's youth set-up in 1946 and signed as a professional in April 1947. In 1951 he was playing for the 'Boro' first team (then in the Football League First Division): over three seasons he played eleven matches, with nine of these appearances and his two goals registered during November and December 1952. On leaving Middlesbrough in 1954 Norris joined Southern League club Worcester City for the 1954–1955 season.

In the summer of 1955 Norris returned to league football after a transfer fee was paid to both Middlesbrough and Worcester by Bournemouth & Boscombe Athletic, then members of the Football League Third Division South. In his three seasons with the 'Cherries' he played in 96 league matches, scoring 34 goals. In 1957 Norris featured in Bournemouth's then best to date FA Cup run when they reached the 1956–57 FA Cup quarter–finals – losing 2–1 at home, in front of a record 28,799 attendance at Dean Court, to league Champions Manchester United. In the previous two rounds they had disposed of two other First Division top six teams: Wolverhampton Wanderers (a 1–0 away win); and Tottenham Hotspur (a 3–1 home win). In the latter game Norris came to public awareness by disrupting Spurs players taking throw–ins by jumping up and down in front of them (before it was made illegal). He scored a goal and an assist in that match and totalled seven goals in Bournemouth's six match cup run. In the quarter–final Norris was injured early in the match and in an era before substittutes he had to play on but was thus hampered from making an effective contribution.

His career with Bournemouth ended in September 1958 when Norris was transferred for a fee to Football League Fourth Division club Northampton Town, for whom in the 1958–1959 season he played 14 matches, scoring 1 goal.

On leaving the 'Cobblers' Norris was appointed player/manager of Southern League second tier Division 1 club Gloucester City prior to the start of their 1959–1960 season. Amid a financial crisis at the 'Tigers' in January 1960 he was dismissed as full–time player/manager and offered, as an alternative, a part–time role as player/coach – an offer Norris rejected. Two months later he joined fellow Southern League Division 1 club Ashford Town. In 17 league matches Norris played for the 'Nuts and Bolts' in 1960 (spread over the 1959–1960 & 1960–1961 seasons) he scored 8 goals before, in December 1960, asking to be released from his contract. Norris then had a trial with Football League Fourth Division club Rochdale playing two league matches and scoring one goal. In March 1961, following what was a short stay with the 'Dale', Norris returned to Ashford and in his second stint with the club he played a further 12 matches, scoring 2 goals, before leaving at the season's end in May 1961.

In the summer of 1961 Norris returned to Ireland with plans to emigrate to Australia. He played in some pre-season matches for hometown club Derry City but they were unable to agree terms with him and instead Norris joined League of Ireland club Sligo Rovers.

By the spring of 1962 Norris had emigrated and took up the role of player/manager with Australian Victorian State League club Wilhelmina and remained with the club for two and a half seasons until mid 1964; he ended the 1964 season with Victorian League second tier Victorian Metropolitan League Division 1 club Croatia who finished the season as Champions. For the 1965 season Norris was the coach of Victorian State League club Hakoah, leaving in the early part of the 1966 season.

Norris died after a long illness on 14 June 2011 aged 82 in Melbourne, Australia.
