= Tom Smalley =

English footballer (1912–1984)

Personal information
- Full name: Thomas Smalley
- Date of birth: 13 January 1912
- Place of birth: Kinsley, West Yorkshire, England
- Date of death: 1 April 1984 (aged 72)
- Place of death: Wolverhampton, England
- Position: Right-half

Senior career*
Years	Team	Apps	(Gls)
?–1931	South Kirkby		
1931–1938	Wolverhampton Wanderers	179	(11)
1938–1945	Norwich City	42	(1)
1945–1951	Northampton Town	200	(2)
1951–19??	Lower Gornal Athletic		
Total		421	(14)

International career
1936	England	1	(0)
- * Club domestic league appearances and goals

Thomas Smalley (13 January 1912 – 1 April 1984) was an English professional footballer who played as a half-back for Wolverhampton Wanderers and Norwich City before the Second World War and for Northampton Town in the post-war period, making a total of over 420 appearances for the three clubs. He also made one appearance for England in 1936.

== Career ==
Smalley was born at Kinsley, West Yorkshire and after school he worked for the nearby South Kirkby Colliery. Whilst playing for South Kirkby, he was spotted by a scout from Wolverhampton Wanderers who signed him in May 1931. Whilst at South Kirkby he was also occasionally called upon to play for Barnsley reserves, but ultimately Wolves beat Barnsley to his registration. As a schoolboy he also represented the Yorkshire County team. In his final year at South Kirkby he was prolific, scoring at least 50 goals in the season.

At the end of his first season with the Molineux club, Wolves won the Second Division title to return to the First Division after an absence of 26 years. Smalley had a "never-say-die" attitude which brought him to the attention of the England selectors who picked him to play at right-half for the Home Championship against Wales at Ninian Park, Cardiff on 17 October 1936. England lost the match 2–1, with Wales going on to claim the championship; Smalley was replaced in the next international, against Ireland, by Everton's Cliff Britton and never played international football again.

Smalley helped Wolves reach the runners-up position in the First Division in 1937–38 before being sold to Norwich City for £4,500 in August 1938. In his seven years at Wolves, Smalley made nearly 200 first-team appearances in all competitions.

On joining Norwich, Smalley was appointed team captain and was ever-present during the 1938–39 season; Smalley's experience, however, was not able to prevent Norwich finishing in the penultimate position in the table and they were relegated to the Third Division South. Smalley played in the first three matches of the 1939–40 season before the League was abandoned following the outbreak of the Second World War.

Smalley remained at the Carrow Road club throughout the war but was transferred in October 1945 to fellow Third Division South club, Northampton Town where he "formed a formidable partnership with Bill Barron as the last outfield line of defence". He remained with "the Cobblers" until 1951 when, in his fortieth year, he dropped out of League football.

He then had a spell as player-coach at Lower Gornal Athletic before retiring completely.

== Honours ==
Wolverhampton Wanderers

- Football League Second Division: 1931–32
- Football League First Division runners-up: 1937–38
