= Maurice Marston =

English footballer

Personal information
- Full name: Maurice Marston
- Date of birth: 24 March 1929
- Place of birth: Trimdon, England
- Date of death: 2002 (aged 72–73)
- Position: Full-back

Youth career
- 1948–1949: Silksworth Juniors

Senior career*
Years	Team	Apps	(Gls)
1949–1953	Sunderland	9	(0)
1953–1957	Northampton Town	149	(2)
1957–19??	Kettering Town		
Total		158	(2)
- * Club domestic league appearances and goals

Maurice Marston (24 March 1929 – 2002) was an English professional footballer who played as a full-back for Sunderland.
