= Bill Gormlie =

English footballer and manager

Personal information
- Full name: William Gormlie
- Date of birth: 12 May 1911
- Date of death: 10 July 1976 (aged 65)
- Position: Goalkeeper

Managerial career
- Years: Team
- 1947–1953: Belgium
- 1950–1960: Anderlecht

William Joseph Gormlie (12 May 1911 – 1976) was an English football player and manager. He played as a goalkeeper for Blackburn Rovers and Northampton Town. After his playing career he coached Belgian club R.S.C. Anderlecht and the Belgium national team. He led Anderlecht to the league title five times: in 1951, 1954, 1955, 1956 and 1959. He stood 5 ft 11 in (1.80 m) tall.
