= Frank Davies (footballer, born 1903) =

Welsh footballer

Personal information
- Full name: Frank Palmer Davies
- Date of birth: 1 August 1903
- Place of birth: Swansea, Wales
- Date of death: 1970 (aged 66–67)
- Position: Wing half

Senior career*
Years	Team	Apps	(Gls)
1922–1923	Bath City		
1923–1926	Bristol City	54	(0)
1926–1928	Charlton Athletic	25	(1)
1928–1929	Portsmouth	0	(0)
1929–1930	Nantwich		
1930–1934	Northampton Town	144	(7)
1934	Burton Town		
Total		223	(8)
- * Club domestic league appearances and goals

Frank Palmer Davies (1 August 1903–1970) was a Welsh footballer who played in the Football League for Bristol City, Charlton Athletic and Northampton Town.
