= Frank Brett =

English footballer

Personal information
- Full name: Frank Bernard Brett
- Date of birth: 10 March 1899
- Place of birth: Kings Norton, England
- Date of death: 21 July 1988 (aged 89)
- Position: Full-back

Senior career*
Years	Team	Apps	(Gls)
?–1921	Aston Villa		
1921–1922	Manchester United	10	(0)
1922–1923	Aston Villa		
1923–1927	Northampton Town	254	(4)
Total		264	(4)
- * Club domestic league appearances and goals

Frank Bernard Brett (born 10 March 1899 – 21 July 1988) was an English footballer who played as a full back.
