= Ted Bowen =

English footballer (1903–?)

Personal information
- Full name: Edward Bowen
- Date of birth: 1 July 1903
- Place of birth: Goldthorpe, Yorkshire, England
- Position: Centre-forward

Senior career*
Years	Team	Apps	(Gls)
1926–1927	Arsenal	1	(0)
1927–1932	Northampton Town	162	(114)
1932–1934	Bristol City	61	(37)
Total		224	(151)
- * Club domestic league appearances and goals

Edward 'Ted' Bowen (born 1 July 1903 – unknown) was an English professional footballer who played as a centre-forward in the English Football League.

== Career ==
=== Amateur ===
A free scoring, strong and sturdy 5'8" centre-forward, Bowen began his football career as an amateur with Goldthorpe United, before spells with two other neighbouring sides, Mexborough and Wath Athletic in the Midland League.

=== Arsenal ===
His goalscoring record impressed Arsenal enough to sign him for £500 in February 1926, arriving late to the professional game at 22 years old. For the reserves, Bowen scored 56 goals across 61 appearances in the London Combination, along with a further 21 goals in 11 friendly matches. Despite this, itt was more than a year before he made his league debut for Arsenal, against Bury in May 1927; his only league appearance.

=== Northampton Town ===
Former Northampton Town player and manager, Herbert Chapman, who was Arsenal manager at the time, suggested Bowen to the club and after failing to break into the first team, Bowen joined Northampton Town for £750 in February 1928. At the County Ground he immediately achieved cult status, scoring a hat-trick on his debut during a 4–3 win against Norwich City at Carrow Road, the first to score a hat-trick since Fanny Walden. Bowen scored a further 15 times in the 1927–28 season, as Northampton Town finished runners-up in the Third Division South. He had his most successful season the following year, going onto score 34 league goals, despite the club finishing a place lower in 3rd. Bowen continued to be top scorer over the following two years scoring 28 league goals in each season. The 1930–31 season included two hat-tricks before Christmas, against Brentford at Griffin Park and his first at home, against Swindon Town. His high standards dropped slightly in the 1931–32 season, but still scored 15 goals before being dropped for Albert Dawes in February 1932, which led to the end of his career at the County Ground.

=== Bristol City ===
At the age of 29, Bristol City acquired his services ahead of the 1932–33 season. Bowen again was top-scorer for his new club, scoring two hat-tricks amongst his 32 goals.

Towards the end of the 1933–34 season, Bowen was dropped to the reserves after only scoring 5 goals in 18 appearances and according to the Western Daily Press, he had been placed on the transfer list. No offers arrived and in September he sustained a serious knee injury playing for the reserves against Portsmouth and a cartilage operation followed which effectively ended his career.
