= Jack Ansell =

English footballer

Personal information
- Full name: William John Ansell
- Date of birth: 4 August 1921
- Place of birth: Newport Pagnell, England
- Date of death: 22 April 2008 (aged 86)
- Place of death: England
- Position: Goalkeeper

Senior career*
Years	Team	Apps	(Gls)
?–1948	Bletchley Brickworks	?	(?)
1948–1952	Northampton Town	131	(0)
1952–1955	Headington United	149	(0)
Total		280	(0)
- * Club domestic league appearances and goals

William John Ansell (4 August 1921 – 22 April 2008), more commonly known as Jack Ansell, was an English footballer who played for Bletchley Brick Works, Northampton Town and Oxford United. During his spell at Northampton, he played 105 consecutive league and cup games, before a broken leg ended the run. He died on 22 April 2008.
