= Bobby King (footballer) =

English footballer

Personal information
- Full name: Frederick Alfred Robert King
- Date of birth: 19 September 1919
- Place of birth: Northampton, England
- Date of death: 20 May 2003 (aged 83)
- Place of death: Northampton, England
- Position: Forward

Senior career*
Years	Team	Apps	(Gls)
1937–1945	Northampton Town	45	(6)
1945–1947	Wolverhampton Wanderers	6	(3)
1947–1949	Northampton Town	56	(17)
- Rushden Town
Total		107	(26)
- * Club domestic league appearances and goals

Frederick Alfred Robert King (19 September 1919 – 20 May 2003) was an English footballer who played in the Football League for Northampton Town and Wolverhampton Wanderers.
