= Willie Watson (English footballer) =

English footballer

Personal information
- Full name: William Watson
- Date of birth: Not known
- Place of birth: Carlisle, England
- Date of death: Not known
- Position: Full-back

Senior career*
Years	Team	Apps	(Gls)
1919–1920	Carlisle United		
1920–1929	Northampton Town	326	(4)
- * Club domestic league appearances and goals

William 'Willie' Watson was an English professional footballer who played as a full-back in the English Football League for Northampton Town.

== Career ==
Born in Carlisle, Watson joined his local North Eastern League club Carlisle United in 1919 after the Great War.

Watson then signed for newly elected Football League Third Division Northampton Town in 1920 following new manager Bob Hewison down from the North. He made his Football League debut against Queens Park Rangers at Loftus Road in September 1920. Watson played nine seasons as a first team regular playing over 40 games a season for each of his first six seasons and was an ever present in their 1924–25 campaign. He was part of the team that finished runners-up in the 1927–28 season, missing out on promotion, before retiring the at the end of the following season.
