= Len Hammond (footballer) =

English footballer

Personal information
- Full name: Leonard Hammond
- Date of birth: 12 September 1901
- Place of birth: Rugby, England
- Date of death: 1983 (aged 81–82)
- Position: Goalkeeper

Senior career*
Years	Team	Apps	(Gls)
–1924	Rugby Town		
1924–1933	Northampton Town	301	(0)
1933–	Notts County		
- Rugby Town
- * Club domestic league appearances and goals

Leonard Hammond (12 September 1901 – 1983) was an English professional footballer who played as a goalkeeper in the English Football League.

== Career ==
Born in 1901, in Rugby, Hammond played for his local club before joining Third Division South club Northampton Town in 1924 under Bob Hewison. During his time with the club, Hammond achieved six consecutive clean sheets, a record which wouldn't be equalled until Alan Starling in 1976.
