= Steve Terry =

English footballer

Personal information
- Full name: Steven Graham Terry
- Date of birth: 14 June 1962 (age 64)
- Place of birth: Clapton, Hackney, England
- Height: 6 ft 1 in (1.85 m)
- Position: Defender

Youth career
- Cheshunt
- Watford

Senior career*
Years	Team	Apps	(Gls)
1979–1988	Watford	160	(14)
1988–1990	Hull City	62	(4)
1990–1994	Northampton Town	181	(17)
- Walton & Hersham
- Enfield
- Billericay Town
Total		303	(35)
- * Club domestic league appearances and goals

Steven Graham Terry (born 14 June 1962) is an English former professional footballer who played as a defender in the Football League for Watford, Hull City and Northampton Town. He played in the 1984 FA Cup Final for Watford.

== Career ==
Playing for the junior teams of Cheshunt before becoming an apprentice at Watford, Terry also played for Hull City, Northampton Town and Walton & Hersham. He later played non-league football with Enfield and Billericay Town.

== Honours ==
Watford

- FA Cup runner-up: 1983–84
