= Dave Smith (footballer, born 1915) =

English footballer

Personal information
- Full name: David Smith
- Date of birth: 12 October 1915
- Place of birth: South Shields, England
- Date of death: 26 January 1998 (aged 82)
- Place of death: Derby, England
- Position: Inside forward

Senior career*
Years	Team	Apps	(Gls)
1935–1936	Newcastle United	1	(0)
1936–1943	South Shields		
1946–1951	Northampton Town	128	(31)

Managerial career
- 1954–1959: Northampton Town
- 1959–1967: Aldershot
- * Club domestic league appearances and goals

David Smith (born 12 October 1915 – 26 January 1998) was an English professional footballer who played as an inside-forward in the English Football League.

== Playing career ==
Smith made his only appearance for Newcastle in a 1–1 draw against Burnley at St James' Park in the Second Division. During the Second World War, Smith guested for Derby County and Glasgow Rangers before joining Northampton Town in 1946.

== Managerial career ==
After retiring as a player during the 1950–51 season, Smith stayed on at Northampton in a coaching capacity before becoming club secretary until 1954. He was then offered the managers job following the departure of Bob Dennison to Middlesbrough in July. His most notable achievement was taking Northampton Town to the fourth round of the 1957–58 FA Cup, defeating First Division Arsenal 3–1 in the third round, before losing to Liverpool.

== Career statistics ==
Appearances and goals by club, season and competition
Club	Season	League			FA Cup		Total	
Club	Season	Division	Apps	Goals	Apps	Goals	Apps	Goals
Newcastle United
Newcastle United	1935–36	Second Division	1	0	0	0	1	0
Newcastle United	Total		1	0	0	0	1	0
Northampton Town
Northampton Town	1945–46	n/a	0	0	1	1	1	1
Northampton Town	1946–47	Third Division South	41	17	5	0	46	17
Northampton Town	1947–48	Third Division South	24	4	1	0	25	4
Northampton Town	1948–49	Third Division South	35	7	2	1	37	8
Northampton Town	1949–50	Third Division South	26	3	5	0	31	3
Northampton Town	1950–51	Third Division South	2	0	0	0	2	0
Total			128	31	14	2	142	33
Career total			129	31	14	2	143	33

== Managerial statistics ==
Managerial record by team and tenure
Team	From	To	Record				
Team	From	To	P	W	D	L	Win %
Northampton Town	July 1954	July 1959	241	103	39	99	42.7
Aldershot	July 1959	March 1967	353	134	76	143	38.0
Total			594	237	115	242	39.9
