= Bill Barron =

English sportsman (1917–2006)

Personal information
- Full name: William Barron
- Date of birth: 26 October 1917
- Place of birth: Houghton-le-Spring, England
- Date of death: 2 January 2006 (aged 88)
- Place of death: Northampton, England
- Position: Left back

Senior career*
Years	Team	Apps	(Gls)
–1936	Hartlepools United	0	(0)
1936–	Wolverhampton Wanderers	0	(0)
–1937	Annfield Plain		
1937–1938	Charlton Athletic	3	(0)
1938–1951	Northampton Town	166	(4)
Total		169	(4)
- * Club domestic league appearances and goals

William Barron (26 October 1917 – 2 January 2006) was an English sportsman, who played football in the higher leagues before the Second World War and, along with some football, first-class cricket afterwards.

== Sporting career ==
William Barron was born in Herrington, Co Durham on 26 October 1917. Before the Second World War, Barron, his first name shortened to Bill, was mostly known as a footballer, playing for Wolverhampton Wanderers (though not in a first team fixture), Charlton Athletic and Northampton Town. He was mostly a forward, but played on after the war for Northampton as a left-back.

His post-war focus was on cricket: a left-handed batsman and leg-break bowler and an occasional wicketkeeper, Barron played 118 first-class games for Northamptonshire between 1946 and 1951. His first-class debut, however, came in a 1945 match for Lancashire against Yorkshire. He also played once for Sir PF Warner's XI in 1947. He died in Northampton on 2 January 2006, aged 88.

== Personal life ==
Barron's son Roger also became a footballer.
