= Neil Grayson =

English footballer (born 1964)

Personal information
- Date of birth: 1 November 1964 (age 61)
- Place of birth: York, England
- Position: Striker

Senior career*
Years	Team	Apps	(Gls)
1989–1990	Rowntree Mackintosh	44	(27)
1990–1991	Doncaster Rovers	29	(6)
1991	York City	1	(0)
1991–1992	Chesterfield	15	(0)
1992	Gateshead	14	(3)
1992–1994	Boston United	80	(31)
1994–1997	Northampton Town	120	(31)
1997–1998	Hereford United	24	(11)
1998–2002	Cheltenham Town	162	(48)
2002–2004	Forest Green Rovers	64	(24)
2004–2008	Stafford Rangers	170	(54)
2008–2010	Glapwell	89	(25)
2010–2011	Carlton Town	35	(9)
2011	Heanor Town	1	(0)
2011–2012	Carlton Town	21	(2)
2012–2013	Heanor Town	9	(1)
2013–2014	Sutton Town	?	(?)
Total		878	(273)

International career
1998–1999	England National Game XI	4	(3)

Managerial career
- 2007–2008: Stafford Rangers (player-joint manager)
- * Club domestic league appearances and goals

Neil Grayson (born 1 November 1964) is an English former professional footballer who played as a striker.

== Club career ==
Grayson's first club was local outfit Rowntree Mackintosh, playing in the Northern Counties East Football League Division One. He was snapped up by Doncaster Rovers in March 1990 where he stayed for just over a year. He has had spells at a number of clubs at various tiers, including York City, Chesterfield and Northampton Town in the Football League. Whilst at Northampton he scored the fastest ever hat-trick by a Northampton player, in five minutes against Hartlepool, and also helped the Cobblers win the Division Three playoffs.

In 1997, he dropped back into non-league football with Hereford United who paid £20,000 for him. He quickly became a fans favourite, scoring his first ever FA Cup goals in Hereford's 2–1 revenge win over Brighton, and went on to score a goal in every two games for the Edgar Street side. This was enough for Cheltenham Town to make a £15,000 bid that the financially troubled Bulls could not refuse in March 1998. He was instrumental in Cheltenham's promotion to the Football League in 1998–99, scoring a spectacular goal against Morecambe, the winner against Rushden & Diamonds in a Conference Championship showdown. He was subsequently named Conference Player of the Year. During the 2001–2002 season, he scored one of his most memorable goals, a volley from at least 30 yards at Whaddon Road in the Division 3 game against Plymouth. His last appearances for the club were in the successful 2001–02 playoff campaign where he scored a vital equaliser in the semi-finals first leg and scored his penalty in the shootout in the second leg. For his final game for the Robins, at the Millennium Stadium he came on as a substitute and smashed a shot against the post, with recent signing John Finnigan netting the re-bound. He was soon released by the club and then joined non-league side Forest Green Rovers in the Conference.

He spent two seasons at Forest Green Rovers, and then signed for Stafford Rangers in March 2004, scoring twice on his league debut against Moor Green. He played over 100 times for Stafford, notably scoring in the 2006 Conference North playoff final against Droylsden.

Neil was named as an all-time cult hero both at Northampton and Cheltenham, in a FourFourTwo magazine poll.

In 2010, he signed for Carlton Town and stayed for the 2010–11 season, scoring 17 goals in 46 appearances; a short period at Heanor Town in August 2011, where he made only one appearance, was followed by a return to Carlton for season 2011–12. However, his second spell with the club was considerably less prolific than his first; having played 26 games and scored only two goals, he moved once more to Heanor in January 2012.

Making his debut for Heanor in a 2–1 East Midlands Counties League Cup quarter-final win over Blackwell Miners Welfare on 15 February 2012, Grayson scored on his league debut for the club, a 4–3 home victory over Oadby Town on 18 February 2012. He went on to make a further 8 appearances during Heanor's East Midlands Counties League Premier Division title-winning season in 2011–12, however did not add to his goal tally.

Grayson signed in 2013 for Heanor's divisional rivals Sutton Town, playing for the club until their resignation from the league at the end of the 2013–2014 season.

== International career ==
Neil Grayson was capped four times, scoring three goals, for the England National Game XI from 1998 to 1999.

== Personal life ==
In May 2026, Grayson revealed his diagnosis with motor neurone disease and dementia.

== Honours ==
Northampton Town

- Football League Third Division play-offs: 1997

Cheltenham Town

- Football League Third Division play-offs: 2002
