= Cliff Holton =

English footballer (1929–1996)

- Holton in 1958

Personal information
- Full name: Clifford Charles Holton
- Date of birth: 29 April 1929
- Place of birth: Oxford, England
- Date of death: 31 May 1996 (aged 67)
- Position: Centre forward

Youth career
- Oxford City

Senior career*
Years	Team	Apps	(Gls)
1947–1958	Arsenal	198	(83)
1958–1961	Watford	120	(84)
1961–1962	Northampton Town	62	(50)
1962–1965	Crystal Palace	101	(40)
1965–1966	Watford	24	(12)
1966	Charlton Athletic	18	(7)
1966–1968	Leyton Orient	47	(17)
Total		570	(293)
- * Club domestic league appearances and goals

Clifford Charles Holton (29 April 1929 – 31 May 1996) was an English footballer.

Born in Oxford, Holton played as a full back for non-league Oxford City as a youth, before joining Arsenal in October 1947 at the age of 18. He spent three seasons in Arsenal's' reserve team, eventually converting to a centre forward, although his progress was restricted in part by national service. He made his debut against Stoke City on 26 December 1950; initially a bit-part player, he became an established regular in the side in 1951–52 and remained there for three seasons. He was in the Arsenal side to reach the FA Cup Final in 1952.

With 22 goals (19 of them in the league) he helped Arsenal to a First Division title in 1952–53. However, he lost his place in the Arsenal side in 1954–55, before returning the following season (1955–56), having been converted into a utility man – playing in defence, midfield or up front. He continued to figure for Arsenal for another three seasons and on 6 October 1956, he scored four goals in a home match against Manchester City, becoming the first player since Jack Lambert to score more than three in a game at Highbury. In all he scored 88 goals in 217 matches for Arsenal. Although he was often tipped for an England place, he never won a cap for his country.

Holton was sold to Watford in October 1958 for £9,000, a somewhat surprising move, considering Watford were in the newly formed Fourth Division at the time. Holton spent three seasons with the Hornets, mostly at centre forward. He formed a successful partnership with Dennis Uphill, scoring a club record 48 goals in 1959–60, which also saw the club promoted to the Third Division. Holton was then controversially sold to Northampton Town in 1961 where he scored a club record 36 goals in 1961–62, thus achieving the rare feat of holding the all-time goals in a season record at two different clubs.

Holton went on to play for Crystal Palace, signing in December 1962 and was part of the Palace side which achieved promotion to the second tier in 1964, with 43 appearances that season scoring 20 goals. He then signed for Watford (for a second time) on 6 May 1965, before moving on to Charlton Athletic (in a deal which saw Stewart Scullion move in the opposite direction) and subsequently Leyton Orient. He finally retired in 1968, due in part to a knee injury, and left the game completely to take up a career in engineering. He died suddenly while on holiday in 1996, at the age of 67.

== Honours ==
Arsenal

- Football League First Division: 1952–53
- FA Charity Shield: 1953
- FA Cup runner-up: 1951–52
