= Billy Pease =

English footballer

Personal information
- Full name: Willie Pease
- Date of birth: 30 September 1899
- Place of birth: Leeds, England
- Date of death: 2 October 1955 (aged 56)
- Place of death: Redcar, England
- Height: 5 ft 9 1/2 in (1.77 m)
- Position: Outside right

Youth career
- Holbeck St. Barnabas

Senior career*
Years	Team	Apps	(Gls)
1918–1919	Leeds City	0	(0)
1919–1926	Northampton Town	278	(46)
1926–1933	Middlesbrough	222	(99)
1933–1935	Luton Town	33	(8)

International career
1927	England	1	(0)
- * Club domestic league appearances and goals

Willie Pease (30 September 1899 – 2 October 1955) was an English international footballer, who played as an outside right.

He played in the Football League for Northampton Town, Middlesbrough and Luton Town.

== Early and personal life ==
Willie Pease was born on 30 September 1899 in Leeds. His birth name has been mis-reported as William Harold Pease. He was the second of five children.

== Career ==
Pease began his career with Holbeck St. Barnabas before joining the Royal Northumberland Fusiliers during World War I. He signed for Leeds City as an amateur, being sold to Northampton Town (again as an amateur) in October 1919. He moved to Middlesbrough in May 1926, and to Luton Town in June 1933. A role as player-manager of Gateshead in December 1934 and a later role with Hartlepools United both fell through, and he retired in January 1935.

Pease earned one international cap for England in 1927.

== Later life and death ==
Pease was married with three sons. After retiring as a player he entered the licensing trade; in 1939 he was the manager of a hotel in Middlesbrough, and in 1940 he was managing a hotel in Stokesley. He later ran a bed & breakfast in Redcar, where he died on 2 October 1955, aged 56, from a brain hemorrhage.
