= Ron Patterson =

English footballer (1929–2018)

Personal information
- Full name: Ronald Patterson
- Date of birth: 30 October 1929
- Place of birth: Gateshead, England
- Date of death: 7 November 2018 (aged 89)
- Position: Full-back

Youth career
- Crystal Palace

Senior career*
Years	Team	Apps	(Gls)
1949–1952	Middlesbrough	1	(0)
1952–1962	Northampton Town	300	(5)
1962–	Rothwell Town		

Managerial career
- 1962–: Rothwell Town (player-manager)
- Hendon
- * Club domestic league appearances and goals

Ron Patterson was an English professional footballer who played as an Full-back in the English Football League.

== Career ==
Born in Gateshead, Patterson joined Crystal Palace as a youth team player in 1948 before returning to the North East with Middlesbrough after failing to settle in London. In three seasons, he mainly played for the reserves, only playing one league game against Charlton Athletic at The Valley in September 1951.

Patterson was recommended to Football League Third Division team Northampton Town, by his father who was the clubs scout in the North East and signed in the summer of 1952. He soon became a first team regular at the County Ground and was captain of the side who knocked Arsenal out of the FA Cup in 1958.

Patterson later became a qualified FA Coach and assisted Jack Jennings with training sessions, and also coached at local schools in Northampton. After 317 games for the Cobblers he moved on to Rothwell Town as player-manager before taking over as manager at Hendon while working as a manager of an ICI subsidiary company.
