= Alan Woan =

English footballer (1931–2021)

Personal information
- Full name: Alan Esplin Woan
- Date of birth: 8 February 1931
- Place of birth: Liverpool, England
- Date of death: 13 February 2021 (aged 90)
- Position: Inside forward

Youth career
- ?–?: Bootle
- ?–1953: New Brighton

Senior career*
Years	Team	Apps	(Gls)
1953–1956	Norwich City	21	(7)
1956–1959	Northampton Town	119	(68)
1959–1961	Crystal Palace	41	(21)
1961–1964	Aldershot	108	(44)
1964–?	Chertsey Town	?	(?)
Total		289 +	(140 +)
- * Club domestic league appearances and goals

Alan Woan (8 February 1931 – 13 February 2021) was an English professional footballer who played as an inside forward. He made a total of 289 Football League appearances for Norwich City, Northampton Town, Crystal Palace and Aldershot scoring 140 goals. He also played non-league football for New Brighton and Chertsey Town. He was the father of Ian Woan who also played professional football, most notably for Nottingham Forest and Alan Junior, who played for Stalybridge Celtic.

== Playing career ==
Woan began his career in non-league football, playing for Anfield Road School, Bootle and later New Brighton. In 1953, Woan signed for Norwich City. He scored three minutes into his debut appearance for Norwich City against Northampton Town. Over the next three seasons, Woan made 21 League appearances (seven goals) for Norwich, and 43 times in 77 matches for Norwich City Reserves. In 1956, he moved on to Northampton Town. In his time at Northampton, he scored 68 goals in 118 appearances. However, in October 1959, he was signed by Crystal Palace in exchange for Mike Deakin. He made his Palace debut on 31 October in an away 2–0 win against Gateshead, and between then and February 1961, made 46 appearances, in all competitions, scoring 23 goals. He then moved again, to Aldershot where he made 108 appearances over the next three years, scoring 44 goals, before moving into non-league football with Chertsey Town.

== Later career ==
After retirement, Woan worked with youth players at Tranmere Rovers and subsequently in local government on the Wirral.

== Personal life ==
Woan was born in Liverpool, England. His brother Don and his son Ian were both professional footballers.

== Death ==
Woan died from COVID-19 in 2021.
