= Roly Mills =

English footballer (1933–2010)

Personal information
- Full name: Roland Walter George Mills
- Date of birth: 22 June 1933
- Place of birth: Daventry, England
- Date of death: 8 February 2010 (aged 76)
- Position: Wing half

Senior career*
Years	Team	Apps	(Gls)
1954–1964	Northampton Town,	305	(30)
Total		305	(30)

International career
- England Youth

Managerial career
- Long Buckby
- * Club domestic league appearances and goals

Roland Walter George Mills (22 June 1933 – 8 February 2010) was an English footballer who played as a wing half. He spent his entire career with Northampton Town, where he made 305 appearances. At the start of the 1964/65 season, he became assistant trainer for Northampton and continued to play for the reserves for two or three years, if needed. After retiring from playing he managed non-League club Long Buckby.

He was the father of Gary Mills, a player turned manager.

== Death ==
Mills died on the morning of 8 February 2010 from Alzheimer's disease.
