= Jack English (footballer, born 1923) =

English footballer

Personal information
- Date of birth: 19 March 1923
- Place of birth: South Shields, England
- Date of death: 1985 (aged 61–62)
- Height: 5 ft 7 in (1.70 m)
- Position: Forward

Youth career
- Bristol City

Senior career*
Years	Team	Apps	(Gls)
1947–1960	Northampton Town	301	(135)
1960	Gravesend and Northfleet		
Total		301	(135)
- * Club domestic league appearances and goals

Jack English (19 March 1923 – 1985) was a professional footballer who played for Northampton Town and Gravesend and Northfleet as a forward.

His dad was also called Jack English and managed Northampton between 1931 and 1935.
