= Tommy Fowler =

English footballer

Personal information
- Full name: Thomas Fowler
- Date of birth: 16 December 1924
- Place of birth: Prescot, England
- Date of death: 3 May 2009 (aged 84)
- Place of death: Northampton, England
- Position: Outside left

Youth career
- Everton

Senior career*
Years	Team	Apps	(Gls)
1945–1961	Northampton Town	521	(84)
1961–1962	Aldershot	14	(0)
Total		535	(84)
- * Club domestic league appearances and goals

Thomas Fowler (16 December 1924 – 3 May 2009) was an English footballer who played 17 seasons for Northampton Town as a left-winger, and is the club's all-time appearance record holder, having played 521 league games for the club, and 585 first-team games in all competitions.

A native of Prescot, Lancashire, Fowler began his football career as an amateur on the books of Everton, and had played a few wartime games for Everton before he was called up to serve in the Army during World War II. He was wounded in France, and it was while recovering at a hospital in Bedford that he met Northampton coach Jack Jennings, who invited him to join the Cobblers.

Fowler signed for Northampton in March 1945, and held on to the number 11 shirt for the next 15 years, playing more than 500 games for the club. In 1960, he began losing his place in the team to youngster Barry Lines, and in December 1961 he was allowed to move to Aldershot. Fowler spent two partial seasons at Aldershot, before retiring from the game in late 1962. He settled in Northampton after his retirement from football, and died in May 2009, aged 84.
