= William Lockett =

English footballer

Personal information
- Full name: William Curfield Lockett
- Date of birth: 23 April 1893
- Place of birth: Tipton, England
- Date of death: 1974 (aged 80–81)
- Position: Centre-forward

Senior career*
| Years | Team | Apps | (Gls) |
| 1913–1914 | Wolverhampton Wanderers | 6 | (2) |
| 1920–1926 | Northampton Town | 185 | (69) |
| 1926 | Kidderminster Harriers | | |
| Total | | 191 | (71) |
- * Club domestic league appearances and goals

William Curfield Lockett (23 April 1893 – 1974) was an English footballer who played in the Football League for Northampton Town and Wolverhampton Wanderers.
