= Albert Dawes =

English footballer & cricketer (1907–1973)

Personal information
- Full name: Albert George Dawes
- Date of birth: 23 April 1907
- Place of birth: Frimley Green, Surrey
- Date of death: 23 June 1973 (aged 66)
- Place of death: Goring-by-Sea, Sussex
- Height: 5 ft 9 in (1.75 m)
- Position: Forward

Senior career*
Years	Team	Apps	(Gls)
1929–1933	Northampton Town	164	(82)
1933–1936	Crystal Palace	105	(75)
1936–1938	Luton Town		
1938–1939	Crystal Palace	44	(16)
1939–?	Aldershot		
Total		313	(173)
- * Club domestic league appearances and goals

Albert George Dawes (23 April 1907 – 23 June 1973) was an English professional footballer who played for Northampton Town and Crystal Palace as a forward. He also played one first-class cricket game for Northamptonshire County Cricket Club against Derbyshire in 1933.

Albert's younger brother was Fred Dawes, who also played professionally for both Crystal Palace and Northampton Town.

== Playing career ==
Dawes began his playing career with Northampton Town in 1929 and over four seasons made 184 overall appearances for the club, scoring 103 goals. In December 1933, he signed for Crystal Palace as replacement for Peter Simpson who was injured at that time. Dawes went on to make 105 League appearances in his first spell with Palace scoring 75 times. The 1935–36 season was his most successful scoring 38 times, heading the Division Three South list of goal-scorers and receiving a call-up to the England team. However, he did not appear in the side, being named as twelfth-man, in an era without substitutes.

In December 1936, Dawes was allowed to leave Crystal Palace for Luton Town for a "large fee". Luton were at that time promotion contenders and Dawes helped them to the title and promotion in 1937, before returning to Palace in February 1938, after 44 appearances.

Dawes second spell at Crystal Palace was not as successful as the first and he moved on to Aldershot in the close season of 1939, after a further 44 appearances (16 goals).

The out-break of World War II meant the end of Dawes senior professional career but he returned again to Crystal Palace and made appearances throughout the years of wartime regional league football, before retiring in 1946.

== Later career ==
Albert Dawes died in Goring-by-Sea, Sussex on 23 June 1973 aged 66.
