= Bob Hewison =

English footballer and manager

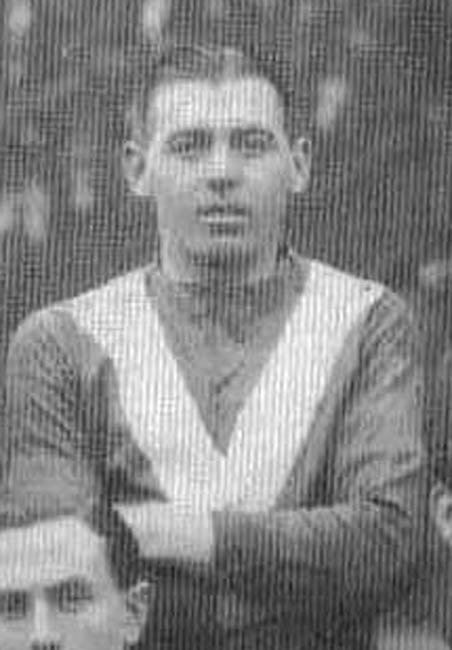

Personal information
- Full name: Robert Hewison
- Date of birth: 25 March 1889
- Place of birth: Backworth, England
- Date of death: 1964 (aged 74–75)
- Positions: Left half; left back; inside left

Youth career
- East Holywell Villa
- Whitley Athletic

Senior career*
Years	Team	Apps	(Gls)
1910–1914	Newcastle United	64	(0)
1914–1919	Leeds City	0	(0)
1919–1920	Newcastle United	3	(0)
1920–1925	Northampton Town	99	(8)
Total		166	(8)

Managerial career
- 1920–1925: Northampton Town
- 1925–1931: Queens Park Rangers
- 1932–1949: Bristol City
- 1949–1949: Gateshead F.C.
- 1950-1957: Guildford City
- 1957–1961: Bath City
- * Club domestic league appearances and goals

Robert Hewison (25 March 1889 – 1964) was an English football player and manager.

== Playing career ==
Born in Backworth, Northumberland, Hewison began his playing career with North East England non-league sides East Holywell Villa and Whitley Athletic before joining Newcastle United in 1910. He joined Leeds City in 1914 but due to the First World War and their expulsion from the Football League he never appeared in an official league match for the club. After suffering a leg break during the 1918-19 season Hewison was asked to serve as City's secretary during their winding up.

== Management career ==
Hewison briefly returned to Newcastle before joining Northampton Town in 1920 as a player-manager. He remained in this position until 1925 when, having retired from playing, he switched to Queens Park Rangers as manager. Under Hewison QPR adopted their familiar blue and white kit although results on the pitch were nothing special for the Third Division South club and he was replaced by Archie Mitchell for the 1931-32 season.

Hewison returned to management in 1932 with Bristol City. However at City Hewison was accused of making illegal payments to amateur players and on 15 October 1938 a joint Football Association and Football League inquiry suspended him until the end of the season, as well as fining the club 100 guineas. When the ban ended in May 1939 (during which time club captain Clarrie Bourton served as caretaker player-manager) Hewison returned to the hot-seat and remained in charge until March 1949. He subsequently managed non-league teams such as Guildford City from 1950 to 1957. Hewison went on to manage Bath City; with whom he built a strong side, signing players such as, Charlie Fleming, Alan Skirton and Ian MacFarlane, captained by Tony Book. Bath went on to win the league in the 1959–60 season, finishing on 67 points (in 42 matches), with the division the Southern League being viewed as; "The foremost non-League competition" at the time. In the same season, Hewison led the club on one of their best ever cup runs, beating Millwall in the FA Cup first round. and then Notts County in the second round. In the third round, Bath went on to play Brighton & Hove Albion at Twerton Park, in front of a record crowd of 18,020, but lost 1–0. Hewison rose as the second most successful manager in the club's history. He stayed with Bath until his retirement in 1961.
