= Northampton Town F.C. =

Association football club in England

Northampton Town
- Full name: Northampton Town Football Club
- Nicknames: The Cobblers; Shoe Army; Teyn
- Founded: 9 March 1897; 129 years ago
- Ground: Sixfields Stadium
- Capacity: 8,203
- Chairman: Joao Xavier and Tim Chamberlain
- Manager: Chris Hogg
- League: EFL League Two
- 2025–26: EFL League One, 24th of 24 (relegated)
- Website: www.ntfc.co.uk
Home colours	Away colours	Third colours

Northampton Town Football Club is a professional association football club based in the town of Northampton, England. The club competes in EFL League Two, the fourth tier of English football, following relegation from EFL League One.

Founded in 1897, the club competed in the Midland League for two seasons, before joining the Southern League in 1901. They were crowned Southern League champions in 1908–09, allowing them to contest the 1909 FA Charity Shield. Admitted into the Football League in 1920, they spent the next 38 years in the Third Division South. Under Dave Bowen, the club achieved three promotions from the Fourth Division to the First Division within five years. However, Northampton only survived for one season in the top tier of English football, being relegated in 1966. Northampton then experienced two further relegations in three years to return to the Fourth Division by 1969 – this set a record in English football of moving from the fourth tier to the first tier and back in only nine years. After six seasons of stability in the fourth tier, the club won promotion before returning to the Fourth Division after another relegation in 1977. Northampton won further promotions to the third tier in 1987 and 1997.

Relegated in 1999, they won immediate promotion after securing an automatic promotion place the following season. However they were once more relegated after three seasons of struggle in the third tier, before securing promotion out of League Two in 2005–06 after two unsuccessful play-off campaigns. Relegated at the end of their third season in League One, they won the League Two title in 2015–16, but only lasted two seasons in League One before again being relegated. In 2020, they gained promotion to League One, but were relegated to League Two once again after a single season in the third tier. They won promotion back to League One in 2023.

Northampton are nicknamed the Cobblers, a reference to the town's historical shoe-making industry, and the team traditionally plays in claret and white kits. The Cobblers played at the County Ground from 1897 until 1994, when they moved to Sixfields Stadium, which has a capacity of 8,203. Northampton's predominant rivals have been Peterborough United in the Nene derby.

== History ==
=== Formation and early history ===
The club was founded on 6 March 1897 by a group of local school teachers who, together with a local solicitor A.J "Pat" Darnell at The Princess Royal Inn, Wellingborough Road, formed the town's first professional football club. Initially, their chosen name was Northampton Football Club, but after objections from the town's rugby club, the club was called Northampton Town Football Club. They joined the Northants League and spent two seasons there, winning the championship the second season. They then spent two seasons in the Midland League, before joining the Southern League in 1901–02. Led by player-manager Herbert Chapman the club were champions of the Southern League in 1908–09 and played against Newcastle United in the Charity Shield match, losing 2–0 at The Oval.

=== Inter-war period ===
Chart of table positions of Northampton Town in the Football League.

In 1919–20, the first season after the war, Town conceded a club record 103 goals. Nonetheless, the club was allowed to join the Football League for the following season, in Division Three (South). 1922–23 saw the club become a public company and 8,000 shares were released at £1. The season produced a record crowd of 18,123 against Plymouth on Boxing Day and gate receipts for the first time exceeded £1,000. 1923–24 started with the club raising £5,000 to build a stand with a players' tunnel underneath and also improved terracing in the Hotel End. The following season saw the formation of the supporters' club. In 1925 the club's first foreign transfer took place as William Shaw was signed from Barcelona. A new ground record was set for the F.A. Cup third-round replay with Sunderland. 21,148 turned up to see the Cobblers lose 3–0. However, disaster occurred at the County Ground during December 1929, when a fire destroyed three stands, with damage valued at around £5,000. Only one stand was saved although this was charred. The source of the fire was thought to be in the away dressing room; the Cobblers had earlier entertained AFC Bournemouth reserves. By August 1930, the stands were rebuilt.

In 1932–33, the club created history when brothers Fred and Albert Dawes both scored in an 8–0 win over Newport County. The latter finished the season scoring 32 league goals and even scored four in a 4–0 win over the Netherlands national football team while the club was on tour. In 1933–34, the F.A. Cup fifth round was reached for the first time courtesy of a fourth round win away to Huddersfield Town who, at the time were top of Division One. The Cobblers lost to Preston North End 4–0 at Deepdale, setting a new ground record of 40,180. In the three seasons prior to the breakout of World War II, the Cobblers finished seventh, ninth and 17th respectively in Division Three (South). In the final match prior to the war, they travelled to Dean Court and lost 10–0, the club's record league defeat. During the war the Cobblers had the record for the first transfer fee received during the hostilities when Bobby King was sold to Wolverhampton Wanderers for a substantial four-figure fee.

=== Rise and fall ===
Northampton were promoted three times in the five years 1960 to 1965. Starting the 1960–61 season in the Fourth Division, they reached the First Division in 1965–66, their only season ever in the top division of English football. They were then relegated back to the Fourth Division over the next five years, playing in the bottom tier again in 1969–70. During their top-flight season they earned a double against Aston Villa and victories at home over clubs including Leeds, Newcastle, West Ham, and Blackburn, the latter being the only team which finished below Northampton in the table.

Since their relegation from the Second Division in 1966–67, Northampton have played every season in either the third or fourth tier of English football.

=== 1970s and 80s ===
In 1970, they lost 8–2 to Manchester United in the FA Cup fifth round. Six of the goals conceded were scored by George Best, who received the match ball (signed by Northampton players) as a reward for his performance. For the first time since becoming a league side the club had to apply for re-election in 1971, they finished the most favoured club with 49 votes. In the 1974–75 season, future England International Phil Neal was sold, after 200 games in all competitions for the Cobblers, Liverpool bought Neal for a then club record of £65,000, whilst playing in the same side of another future England International, John Gregory. Finally during the 1975–76 season, the club finished second in Division Four and were promoted behind champions Lincoln City. They did this without losing a home game and having every regular player score during the season, including the goalkeeper, Alan Starling, who netted from a penalty in the penultimate home game against Hartlepool. In 1976–77, the club were relegated back to Division Four. The season started with ex-Manchester United assistant manager, Paddy Crerand in charge; however, he resigned in the new year. No new manager was appointed and instead a committee was formed consisting of the chairman, the coach and three senior players. Prior to the start of the 1979–80 season, George Reilly was sold to Cambridge United for a then-club record of £165,000 (he had been the club's top scorer for the previous two seasons).

New floodlights were installed in time for the 1980–81 season, but they failed during the first match against Southend United and the game had to be abandoned. The club struggled in the bottom half of the Fourth Division for the first half of the decade, but 16-year-old Aidy Mann became the club's youngest player in May 1984. In 1984–85, the lowest ever league attendance was recorded at the County Ground where only 942 people turn up to watch the Cobblers lose 2–0 at home to Chester City; this was also Northampton's only ever league attendance below 1,000. In the same year, the club managed what seemed like a major coup when they appointed as manager Tony Barton, who had won the European Cup with Aston Villa two years previously. Barton's only season in charge proved severely disappointing however, as the club were never outside the bottom two, and health problems forced Barton's resignation near the end of that season. Success was achieved under Barton's replacement, Graham Carr, who brought in several players from the non-league in addition to a number of quality league players to finish eighth in his first season in charge. The 1986–87 season saw Northampton win the Fourth Division championship, gaining a club record total of 99 points and scoring 103 goals, 29 of them from Richard Hill, who was transferred in the summer to Watford for a club record fee of £265,000. The club adjusted to life in Division Three quickly and just missed out on a play-off place despite finishing sixth. Important players such as Trevor Morley and Eddie McGoldrick were sold and the team fell back down to Division Four in the 1989–90 season.

=== Early 1990s ===
The 1990s began badly, with the club relegated to the Fourth Division at the end of the 1989–90 season. The following season began well as the club looked on course to return to the Third Division at the first attempt. They were top of the table in February, but fell away and finished mid-table. Things then got even worse and the club went into administration in April 1992, with debts of around £1.6 million. Ten players were sacked and youth players were drafted in to make up the numbers; results did not improve. These events sparked the formation of the Northampton Town Supporters' trust, which has a shareholding in the club and a representative on the board of directors. This was the first such instance of a supporters' trust taking over a football club.

The club needed to win the final game of the 1992–93 season to avoid being relegated to the Conference. Over 2,500 made the trip to Shrewsbury Town and saw the Cobblers win 3–2, despite being 2–0 down at half-time. The 1993–94 season got worse for the Cobblers as they finished bottom of the Football League for the only time in the club's history. Relegation was only avoided due to the Conference champions, Kidderminster Harriers, not meeting the necessary ground criteria. The club eventually began its move to Sixfields.

=== The Sixfields era ===
The club moved to new ground, Sixfields Stadium, in October 1994. The change of ground did not change the club's fortunes and they finished 17th, with Ian Atkins taking over as manager from John Barnwell halfway through the 1994–95 season. After two more seasons, in the club's centenary season 1996–97, Atkins lead the Cobblers to Wembley for the first time in 100 years, where they beat Swansea City 1–0 in the Third Division play-off final, John Frain scoring the winning goal from a twice-taken free kick deep into injury time. The following season Northampton made the Second Division play-off final, but lost 1–0 to Grimsby Town in front of a then-record 62,998 crowd, with the Northampton support greater than 40,000 fans also a then-record for the most supporters taken to Wembley by one team. Northampton were not able to progress from the previous year's success because of long-term injuries to 16 of their players during the 1998–99 season. The team was relegated to Division Three, despite being unbeaten in the last nine games of the season. However, there were some promising results such as a 2–1 aggregate win over West Ham United in the League Cup. The 1999–2000 season saw the club bounce back to Division Two, finishing in the third automatic promotion spot. Ian Atkins left the club in October following a poor start to the season; his assistant, Kevin Wilson and coach Kevan Broadhurst took joint charge for the rest of the month. Former Chelsea player Wilson was appointed manager at the start of November, going on to win two manager of the month awards.

The following season started promisingly, with players such as Marco Gabbiadini and Jamie Forrester pushing the Cobblers towards a play-off place before the club eventually finished in 18th place due to a large number of injuries in the second half of the season. Kevin Wilson was sacked in November 2001 to make way for his assistant Kevan Broadhurst, who steered the Cobblers from relegation to a remarkable survival with a game to spare after losing only one home game from mid-January. The next season was the worst since the early 1990s, both financially and on the pitch. Early on they were forced into a 'Save our Season' campaign to keep afloat until the end of the year. It was required after the collapse of ITV Digital and much-publicised takeover attempts by John Fashanu and Giovanni Di Stefano had failed and left the club with huge debts. They were taken over by a consortium run by Andrew Ellis, who sacked Broadhurst in January 2003, when Northampton were struggling at the foot of the division. He was briefly replaced by former England player Terry Fenwick who was sacked after a winless spell of seven games. This was, at the time, the eighth-shortest managerial reign in English football history. Martin Wilkinson, the new manager lasted little longer, being dismissed in October 2003 in favour of former Scotland and Tottenham Hotspur defender Colin Calderwood. Calderwood led Northampton to the play-offs in his first season, where they were knocked out in the semi-finals by Mansfield Town after a penalty shoot-out. In the 2004–05 season, Northampton finished seventh, again in the play-offs, where they were defeated by Southend United. Following this, the manager made substantial changes to the squad, bringing in experienced players such as Ian Taylor and Eoin Jess, and they enjoyed a successful 2005–06 league season. On 29 April, the Cobblers clinched promotion to Football League One, with a 1–0 win at home to Chester City. On 30 May 2006, Northampton announced that Calderwood was leaving to join Nottingham Forest as their new manager, and he was replaced by John Gorman on 5 June. On 20 December, Gorman resigned due to "personal issues" with the side 18th in the table, with Ian Sampson and Jim Barron briefly taking care of first team affairs. He was replaced by former Southampton boss Stuart Gray on 2 January 2007. The Cobblers were relegated from League One on the final day of the 2008–09 season, after suffering a 3–0 defeat away at Leeds United and other results that went against them.

Northampton caused an upset in the third round of the 2010–11 Football League Cup, knocking out Liverpool at Anfield. The game was drawn 2–2 after extra time, as the Cobblers beat the team 69 places above them 4–2 on penalties, the winning penalty being scored by Abdul Osman at the 'Kop End'. Ian Sampson was sacked as manager on 2 March 2011 after a poor run of form saw the Cobblers fail to win in eight games and sit in a disappointing 16th position in League Two. Sampson's last game in charge was a 2–3 defeat against Burton Albion, the manner of this defeat ultimately costing him his job. Sampson's sacking brought to an end a 17-year association with Northampton, and his commitment to the club has guaranteed his status as a legend in fans' hearts.

David Cardoza moved quickly and Gary Johnson was unveiled as the new manager on 4 March 2011. However, things didn't go well under Johnson: the club slid further down the table in League Two and only just avoided relegation at the end of the 2010–11 season. The beginning of the 2011–12 season saw no improvement for the Cobblers and Johnson left the club on 14 November 2011 by mutual consent. In November 2011, Northampton appointed ex-Watford manager Aidy Boothroyd as their new manager. After drafting in players such as Ben Harding, Luke Guttridge and Clarke Carlisle, Boothroyd managed to keep Northampton in the league and over the summer set about transforming the club into a club with promotion ambitions. On 18 May 2013, Northampton reached the League Two play-off final, losing 3–0 to Bradford City at Wembley Stadium.

After a poor start to the 2013–14 League Two season, Northampton found themselves at the foot of the table, and as of 21 December, they had only won four games. Boothroyd was subsequently sacked. From the start of the 2013–14 season, Northampton shared their Sixfields Stadium with Coventry City with the West Midlands club going through a protracted dispute with the owners of their previous home, the Ricoh Arena in Coventry. On 27 January 2014, David Cardoza appointed former Oxford United manager Chris Wilder as the new manager of the club on a three-and-a-half-year deal.

In October 2015, HM Revenue and Customs issued the club with a winding-up petition over unpaid taxes. (See Sixfields Stadium) In February 2016, Northampton Town broke their club record of eight successive wins by beating Wycombe Wanderers 1–0, extending the winning run to nine. The 2015–16 season was successful and resulted in promotion to League One on 9 April. A draw at Exeter combined with Oxford United's defeat at home to Luton Town meant that they clinched the League Two championship a week later on 16 April.

The Cobblers went on to play their first season in the third tier of English football since 2009. In the 2016–17 season, after a 5–0 defeat to Bristol Rovers, Rob Page was sacked and replaced with Justin Edinburgh. Northampton finished 16th, meaning that they would continue to play third-tier football. They made it to the third round of the EFL Cup, where they lost to Manchester United. On 26 June 2017 a 60% stake in Northampton Town was purchased by Chinese company 5uSport. The company indicated that they would invest in both the playing budget and stadium development. Although the investment was technically a takeover, Kelvin Thomas remained chairman and the two parties have acted in partnership since.

On 4 September 2017, Jimmy Floyd Hasselbaink was appointed as manager on a three-year deal, replacing Justin Edinburgh who had been sacked after four losses from the start of the season. His first game was against Doncaster Rovers five days later, a home tie which ended in a 1–0 victory for Northampton Town. He was sacked on 2 April 2018 after Northampton Town went nine games without a win and was replaced by Keith Curle. Curle had his contract extended in July 2020 for a further two years.

On 29 June 2020, the club were promoted to League One after beating Exeter City 4–0 in the play-off final, despite a delay in the season due to the COVID-19 pandemic in the United Kingdom. This was Northampton's fourth EFL play-off final and it ended in victory, 23 seasons after their only other Wembley win for promotion. They made it to Wembley following a second leg comeback against Cheltenham Town, after the first leg at Sixfields Stadium where they had trailed 2–0 and faced an uphill battle to progress to the play-off final. However, in the second leg, the Cobblers performed the turnaround by winning 3–0 away from home. However, Northampton were relegated back to League Two in their first season after finishing 22nd in the 2020–21 season.

In the 2021–22 season Northampton finished fourth, narrowly missing out on automatic promotion. Although Northampton started the final day in the automatic positions and won their match at Barrow 3–1, Bristol Rovers beat Scunthorpe United 7–0 and gained the final automatic promotion place based on goals scored across the season. In the play-off semi-finals, the Cobblers were defeated by Mansfield Town 3–1 on aggregate. In the 2022–23 season, they beat Tranmere Rovers on the final day of the season to finish third and seal automatic promotion to League One. Ensuing League One campaigns saw the club finish 14th in 2024 and 19th in 2025, before being relegated back to League Two in April 2026, finishing bottom and setting a new club record of 10 straight league defeats after a 1–0 loss to Barnsley at Sixfields on 28 April.

In September 2026, the club was sold to Sports Alpha Capital, a consortium of buyers including former Brazil international Alexandre Pato; chairman Kelvin Thomas stepped down as part of the deal. SAC are a British-Brazilian Consortium. They bought a seventy per cent shareholding and it was announced that Pato would be joining the board of the club.

== Club crest and colours ==
=== Shirt sponsors and manufacturers ===
Northampton's kit has been manufactured by Puma since 2023. Previous manufacturers have included Bukta (1975–82), Adidas (1982–83), Umbro (1983–86), Spall (1986–88), MG (1988–89), Scoreline (1989–91), Beaver Sports (1991–92), Ribero (1992–93), Swift (1993–94), Lotto (1995–97), Pro Star (1997–2000), Sport House (2000–03), Xara (2003–05), Salming (2005–06), Vandanel (2006–09), Errea (2009–16), Nike (2016–20), Hummel (2020–23) and Puma (2023–).

The club's shirts are sponsored by the University of Northampton, since 2013, and PTS Academy, since 2016. Previous sponsors have included Chronicle & Echo (1985–86 and 1994–95), TNT (1986–88), Costain Homes (1988–91), Van Aid (1991–92), Carpet Supacentre (1992–94), Lotto (1995–97), EBS Mobile Phones (1997–98), Nationwide (1998–2003), Jackson Grundy (2007–13), Red Hot Buffet (2011–12), Gala Casinos (2012–13), and Opus Energy (2015–18)

== Stadiums ==
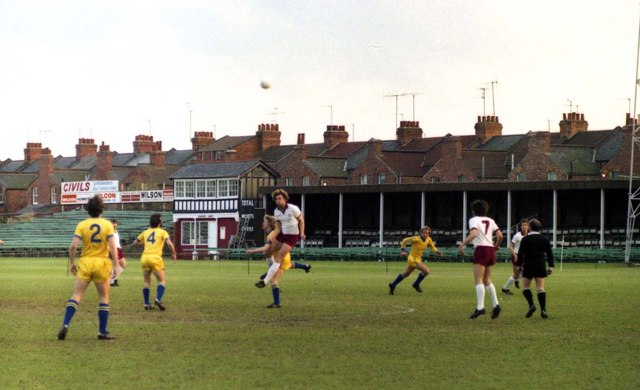
Northampton Town FC playing at the County Ground

=== County Ground ===
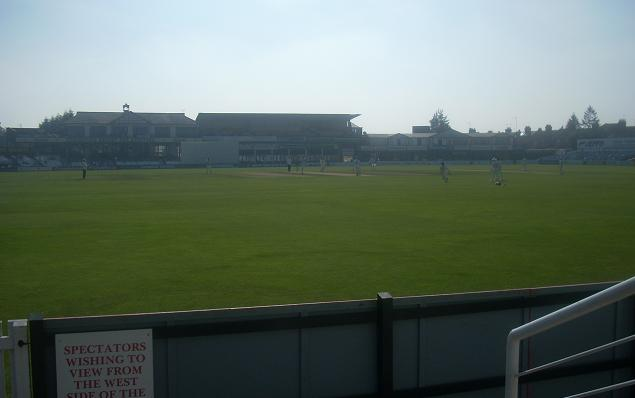
Northampton Town played at the County Ground from 1897 to 1994

Northampton moved to the county ground in 1897, sharing it with Northamptonshire County Cricket Club from 1905. The main stand was situated alongside Abington Avenue and was a covered stand with seating to the rear and terracing to the front. The stand survived until 1985, but following the Bradford City stadium fire, it was deemed unsafe and demolished, leaving only the terracing. This was then replaced by a small temporary stand nicknamed the ' Meccano Stand ' by fans. The other two stands were at the ends with the Spion Kop, which only reached the goalposts, usually used for away supporters and the Hotel End for the home supporters. In 1965–66, the only time that Northampton Town were in the top flight of English football, the county ground saw its highest attendance 24,523 against Fulham on 23 April 1966. The ground also saw Northampton's lowest ever attendance in the Football League, a crowd of 942 for the 1984–85 match against Chester City. The last game to be played at the ground was a 1–0 defeat by Mansfield Town on Tuesday, 12 October 1994.

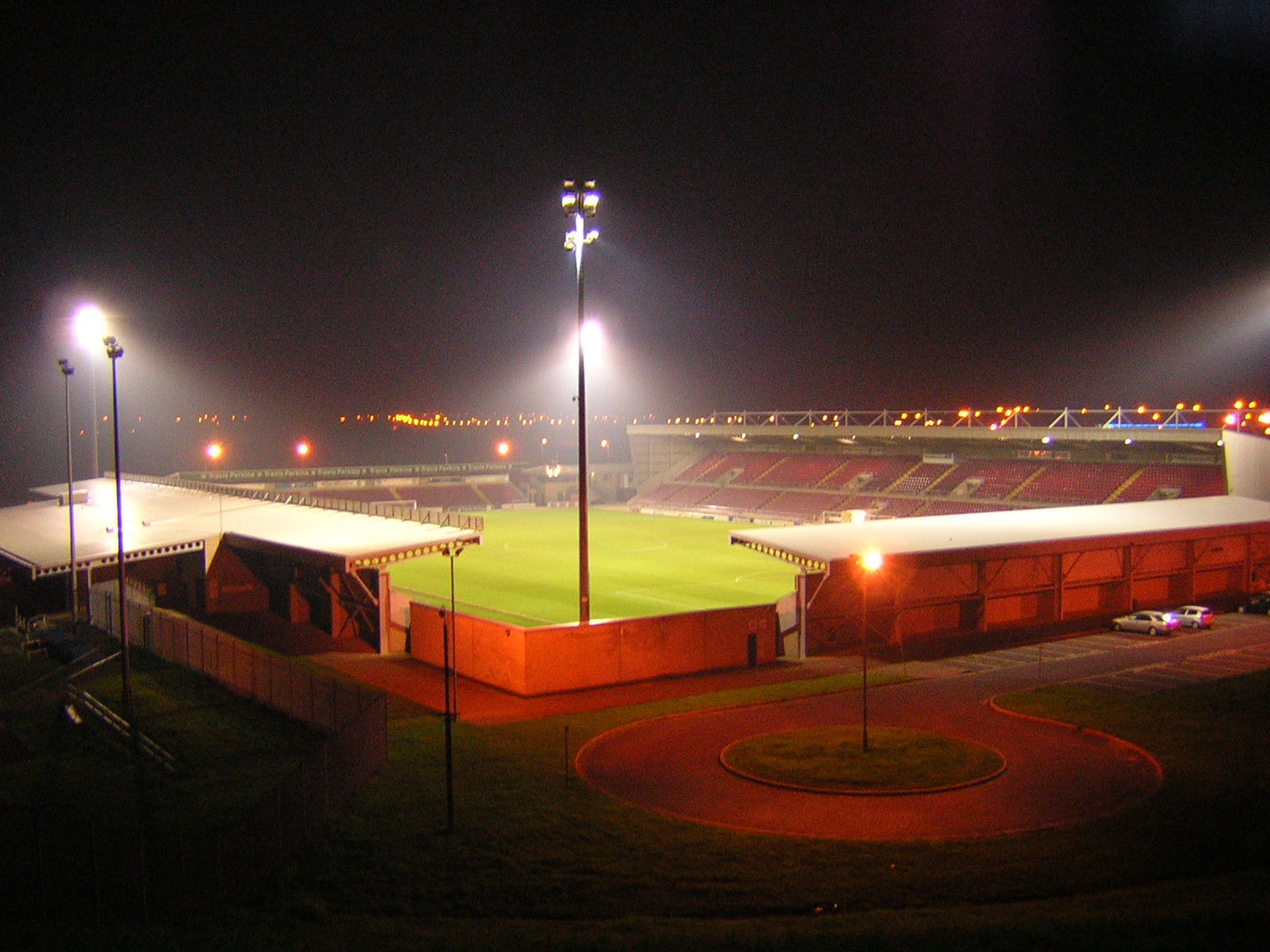
Sixfields Stadium

=== Sixfields Stadium ===
The club moved to Sixfields Stadium in 1994. It is a modern all-seater stadium with a capacity of 8,203 and award-winning disabled facilities. The stadium plan is simple with the west stand seating 4,000, opposite the smaller 2,000-capacity east stand. At either end are identical stands, the south stand usually for away supporters. (Against Chester City on 29 April 2006, the stand was split and supporters segregated to allow the maximum number of home supporters to witness the club's promotion to League One.) The north Stand is named the LCS Dave Bowen Stand after ex-Northampton Town player and manager Dave Bowen, who helped take the club from Division Four to the First Division during the 1960s.

The stadium was renamed the PTS Academy Stadium in June 2018 after the club agreed a naming rights partnership with a local training provider. The name of the stadium reverted to Sixfields Stadium in July 2021, following the liquidation of PTS Training Academy.

Training ground

Since July 2016, Northampton have trained at Moulton College in Moulton, Northampton. Before this, they trained at the former athletics track, located at the back of the East Stand at Sixfields Stadium.

== Supporters and rivalries ==
=== Peterborough United ===
The club's biggest traditional rivals are Peterborough United, a rivalry which has endured since the 1960s. Matches between the two clubs are known as the Nene derby, after the river which links Northampton and Peterborough.

=== Other rivals ===
Other significant rivalries include Oxford United, Milton Keynes Dons, Coventry City, Cambridge United and, until their liquidation, Rushden & Diamonds.

== Players ==
=== Current squad ===
As of 1 September 2026

Note: Flags indicate national team as defined under FIFA eligibility rules; some limited exceptions apply. Players may hold more than one non-FIFA nationality.

No.	Pos.	Nation	Player
1	GK	ENG	Zach Jeacock (on loan from Lincoln City)
3	DF	SCO	James Maxwell
4	MF	IRL	Joe O'Brien-Whitmarsh
5	DF	ENG	Jon Guthrie (captain)
6	DF	ENG	Elliott Moore
7	MF	ENG	Sam Hoskins
8	MF	WAL	Lee Evans
9	FW	ENG	Matty Warhurst
10	MF	ENG	Elliott List
11	MF	ENG	Kamarai Swyer
14	MF	SLE	Tyrese Fornah
15	DF	IRL	Conor McCarthy
16	DF	ENG	Joe Wormleighton
17	FW	GHA	Nathan Opoku

No.	Pos.	Nation	Player
19	FW	ENG	Owen Dale
20	MF	WAL	Logan Briggs (on loan from Leicester City)
21	MF	ENG	Jack Perkins
22	DF	ENG	Josh Powell (on loan from Nottingham Forest)
24	MF	WAL	Connor Evans
26	MF	SCO	Sam Chambers (on loan from Leeds United)
29	MF	ENG	Liam Shaw
30	DF	SCO	Jack Burroughs
31	GK	ENG	James Dadge
32	FW	ENG	Harvey Saunders
34	GK	ENG	Ross Fitzsimons
35	DF	ENG	Max Dyche
44	DF	LCA	Janoi Donacien

=== Out on loan ===
Note: Flags indicate national team as defined under FIFA eligibility rules; some limited exceptions apply. Players may hold more than one non-FIFA nationality.

No.	Pos.	Nation	Player
40	FW	ENG	Neo Dobson (at St Ives Town)

=== Notable players ===
==== PFA Team of the Year ====
The following have been included in the PFA Team of the Year whilst playing for Northampton Town:

- 1974–75 (England) Paul Stratford
- 1980–81 (England) Steve Phillips
- 1986–87 (England) Keith McPherson, (England) Richard Hill, (England) Trevor Morley
- 1999–2000 (England) Ian Hendon
- 2005–06 (England) Ian Taylor, (England) Josh Low
- 2015–16 (England) Adam Smith, (Republic of Ireland) John-Joe O'Toole, (England) Ricky Holmes
- 2019–20 (England) Charlie Goode, (Wales) Nicky Adams
- 2021–22 (England) Liam Roberts, (England) Jon Guthrie, (England) Fraser Horsfall
- 2022–23 (England) Sam Hoskins

==== Cult heroes ====
The following were chosen by fans as the favourite club heroes in the BBC Sports Cult Heroes poll in 2006:

1. (England) Andy Woodman
2. (England) John Frain
3. (Wales) Dave Bowen

== Club management ==
As of 29 June 2026

=== Staff positions ===
- Technical Director: Colin Calderwood
- Manager: Chris Hogg
- Assistant Manager: Chris Doig
- Assistant Manager: Ian Sampson
- Goalkeeper Coach: James Alger
- S & C Lead: Ashlee Adebayo
- S & C Assistant: Joe Power
- Club Doctor: Dr. Bob Sangar
- Head of Medical: Kristian Malcolm
- First Team Physiotherapist: TBC
- First Team Sports Therapist: Tanaya Mayoh
- First Team Lead Analyst: TBC
- First Team Analyst: Ben Withen
- Under 18s Manager: Shane Goddard
- Under 18s Coach: Paul Johnstone
- Head Strategic & Recruitment Analyst: Alex Latimer
- Kit Manager: Adam Moreton
- Kit Assistant: Rob Knell

=== Board of directors and ownership ===
As of 30 September 2026

- Executive chairman: Joao Xavier and Tim Chamberlain
- President: Bob Church
- Directors: Kelvin Thomas,Alexandre Pato
- Board directors: David Bower, Nigel Le Quesne
- Associate Directors: Jim Rosenthal, Mike Wailing
- Technical Director: Colin Calderwood
- Associate Director: Graham Carr

=== Managerial history ===
Below is a list of all permanent managers of Northampton Town since its foundation in 1897.

- 1897–1907: (England) Arthur Jones
- 1907–1912: (England) Herbert Chapman
- 1912–1913: (England) Walter Bull
- 1913–1919: (England) Fred Lessons
- 1920–1925: (England) Bob Hewison
- 1925–1930: (England) Jack Tresadern
- 1931–1935: (England) Jack English
- 1935–1937: (England) Syd Puddefoot
- 1937–1939: (England) Warney Cresswell
- 1939–1949: (England) Tom Smith
- 1949–1954: (England) Bob Dennison
- 1954–1959: (England) Dave Smith
- 1959–1967: (Wales) Dave Bowen
- 1967–1968: (England) Tony Marchi
- 1968–1969: (England) Ron Flowers
- 1969–1972: (Wales) Dave Bowen
- 1972–1973: (Scotland) Billy Baxter
- 1973–1976: (England) Bill Dodgin Jnr
- 1976–1977: (Scotland) Paddy Crerand
- 1977–1978: (England) John Petts
- 1978–1979: (England) Mike Keen
- 1979–1980: (England) Clive Walker
- 1980–1982: (England) Bill Dodgin Jnr
- 1982–1984: (England) Clive Walker
- 1984–1985: (England) Tony Barton
- 1985–1990: (England) Graham Carr
- 1990–1992: (Republic of Ireland) Theo Foley
- 1992–1993: (England) Phil Chard
- 1993–1995: (England) John Barnwell
- 1995–1999: (England) Ian Atkins
- 1999–2001: (Northern Ireland) Kevin Wilson
- 2001–2003: (England) Kevan Broadhurst
- 2003: (England) Terry Fenwick
- 2003: (England) Martin Wilkinson
- 2003–2006: (Scotland) Colin Calderwood
- 2006: (Scotland) John Gorman
- 2007–2009: (England) Stuart Gray
- 2009–2011: (England) Ian Sampson
- 2011: (England) Gary Johnson
- 2011–2013: (England) Aidy Boothroyd
- 2014–2016: (England) Chris Wilder
- 2016–2017: (Wales) Rob Page
- 2017: (England) Justin Edinburgh
- 2017–2018: (Netherlands) Jimmy Floyd Hasselbaink
- 2018: (England) Dean Austin
- 2018–2021: (England) Keith Curle
- 2021–2024: (Australia) Jon Brady
- 2024–2026: (England) Kevin Nolan
- 2026–: (England) Chris Hogg

== Club records ==
Northampton Town hold the record for the shortest time taken to be promoted from the bottom tier to the top tier and relegated back down to the bottom again, in the space of nine years.

Tommy Fowler holds the record for Northampton Town appearances, having played 552 first-team matches between 1946 and 1961. Centre half and former captain Ian Sampson comes second, with 449 games. The record for a goalkeeper is held by Peter Gleasure, with 412 appearances.

Jack English is the club's top goalscorer with 143 goals in competitive matches between 1947 and 1959, having surpassed Teddy Bowen's total of 120. Bowen's record had stood since September 1931, when he overtook the total of 110 goals set by striker William Lockett in 1930.

The highest attendance at the County Ground of 24,523 was on 23 April 1966 in an important relegation battle in the First Division against Fulham. It is unlikely that this record will be broken unless redevelopment takes place at Sixfields. The record attendance at Sixfields is 7,947, for an EFL League One match against Birmingham City on 15 March 2025.

== Honours ==
League

- Second Division (level 2)
  - Runners-up: 1964–65
- Third Division South / Third Division (level 3)
  - Champions: 1962–63
  - Runners-up: 1927–28, 1949–50
- Fourth Division / Third Division / League Two (level 4)
  - Champions: 1986–87, 2015–16
  - Runners-up: 1975–76, 2005–06
  - Promoted: 1960–61, 1999–2000, 2022–23
  - Play-off winners: 1997, 2020
- Southern League
  - Champions: 1908–09
  - Runners-up: 1910–11

Cup

- FA Charity Shield
  - Runners-up: 1909

Notes

A. On its formation for the 1992–93 season, the Premier League became the top tier of English football; the First, Second and Third Divisions then became the second, third and fourth tiers, respectively.
