= 1992–93 Northampton Town F.C. season =

Northampton Town F.C.
1992–93 season
- Chairman: Barry Ward
- Manager: Phil Chard
- Stadium: County Ground
- Division Three: 20th
- FA Cup: Third round
- League Cup: First round
- League Trophy: Quarter-final
- Top goalscorer: League: Steve Brown (9); All: Steve Brown (12)
- Highest home attendance: 7,504 vs Wrexham
- Lowest home attendance: 1,591 vs Barnet
- Average home league attendance: 3,139

The 1992–93 season was Northampton Town's 96th season in their history. It was the third successive season in the fourth tier, in the newly renamed Third Division after the introduction of the breakaway FA Premier League. Alongside competing in Division Three, the club also participated in the FA Cup, League Cup and Football League Trophy.

== Players ==
As of match played 8 May 1993.

Name	Position	Nat.	Place of birth	Date of birth	Apps	Goals	Signed from	Date signed	Fee
Goalkeepers
Barry Richardson	GK	(England)	Wallsend	5 August 1969 (aged 23)	84	0	Stockport County	September 1991	Free
Defenders
Craig Adams	CB	(England)	Northampton	15 February 1974 (aged 19)	1	0	Apprentice	August 1992	N/A
Terry Angus	CB	(England)	Coventry	14 January 1966 (aged 27)	138	6	VS Rugby	July 1990	
Jason Burnham	LB	(England)	Mansfield	8 May 1973 (aged 20)	87	2	Apprentice	July 1991	N/A
Lee Colkin	LB	(England)	Nuneaton	15 July 1974 (aged 18)	32	1	Apprentice	31 August 1992	N/A
Paul Curtis	RB	(England)	London	1 July 1963 (aged 29)	62	2	Corby Town	August 1992	
Ken Gillard	LB	(Republic of Ireland)	Dublin	30 April 1972 (aged 21)	9	0	Luton Town	March 1993	
Mark Parsons	RB	(England)	Luton	24 February 1975 (aged 18)	36	0	Apprentice	February 1992	N/A
Richard Preston	RB	(England)	Basildon	7 April 1976 (aged 17)	0	0	Apprentice	August 1992	N/A
Scott Stackman	CB	(United States)	Arizona	16 November 1975 (aged 17)	0	0	Apprentice	August 1992	N/A
Steve Terry (c)	CB	(England)	Clapton	14 June 1962 (aged 30)	166	17	Hull City	March 1990	£70,000
Midfielders
Stuart Beavon	CM	(England)	Wolverhampton	30 November 1958 (aged 34)	119	18	Reading	July 1990	Part Exchange
Micky Bell	W	(England)	Newcastle-upon-Tyne	15 November 1971 (aged 21)	120	11	Apprentice	April 1990	N/A
Steve Brown	CM	(England)	Northampton	6 July 1966 (aged 26)	176	22	Irthlingborough Diamonds	21 July 1989	Free
Phil Chard	U	(England)	Corby	16 October 1960 (aged 32)	298	53	Wolverhampton Wanderers	October 1989	Free
Darren Harmon	CM	(England)	Northampton	30 January 1973 (aged 20)	32	1	Shrewsbury Town	24 October 1992	Free
Forwards
Martin Aldridge	FW	(England)	Northampton	6 December 1974 (aged 18)	15	2	Apprentice	April 1992	N/A
Riccardo Bulzis	FW	(England)	Bedford	22 November 1974 (aged 18)	4	0	Apprentice	April 1992	N/A
Pat Gavin	FW	(England)	Hammersmith	5 June 1967 (aged 25)	14	4	Barnet	February 1993	Free
Kevin Wilkin	FW	(England)	Cambridge	1 October 1967 (aged 25)	63	8	Cambridge City	August 1990	Free
Stuart Young	FW	(England)	Kingston upon Hull	1 October 1967 (aged 25)	8	2	Hull City	February 1993	N/C

== Competitions ==
=== Division Three ===
==== League table ====
Pos	Team	Pld	W	D	L	GF	GA	GD	Pts	Promotion or relegation
18	Carlisle United	42	11	11	20	51	65	−14	44	
19	Torquay United	42	12	7	23	45	67	−22	43	
20	Northampton Town	42	11	8	23	48	74	−26	41	
21	Gillingham	42	9	13	20	48	64	−16	40	
22	Halifax Town (R)	42	9	9	24	45	68	−23	36	Relegation to Football Conference

(R) Relegated

==== Results summary ====
Overall								Home						Away					
Pld	W	D	L	GF	GA	GD	Pts	W	D	L	GF	GA	GD	W	D	L	GF	GA	GD
42	11	8	23	48	74	−26	41	6	5	10	19	28	−9	5	3	13	29	46	−17

Last updated: 26 April 2022.

==== League position by match ====
Round	1	2	3	4	5	6	7	8	9	10	11	12	13	14	15	16	17	18	19	20	21	22	23	24	25	26	27	28	29	30	31	32	33	34	35	36	37	38	39	40	41	42
Ground	A	A	A	H	A	A	H	H	A	H	H	H	A	H	H	H	A	A	H	A	H	A	H	H	A	H	A	H	H	A	A	A	H	A	A	H	H	H	A	A	H	A
Result	W	L	L	D	W	L	L	L	L	L	L	L	W	D	L	W	L	D	W	L	D	D	L	L	W	D	L	L	L	L	W	L	W	L	L	W	W	D	L	D	L	W
Position	6	11	17	18	12	18	19	21	22	22	22	22	21	21	21	21	22	21	21	21	20	20	21	21	20	20	20	21	22	22	20	22	22	20	21	20	20	20	20	19	19	20

Source: 11v11.com
A = Away; H = Home; W = Win; D = Draw; L = Loss

==== Matches ====
Win Draw Loss

15 August 1992 1	Gillingham	2–3	Northampton Town	Gillingham
15:00 BST			S.Brown; M.Scott; P.Chard	Stadium: Priestfield; Attendance: 3,869

28 August 1992 2	Crewe Alexandra	3–2	Northampton Town	Crewe
19:30 BST			S.Brown; S.Terry	Stadium: Gresty Road; Attendance: 3,608

1 September 1992 3	Cardiff City	2–1	Northampton Town	Cardiff, Wales
19:30 BST	P.Ramsey (pen.); C.Dale		S.Brown	Stadium: Ninian Park; Attendance: 7,494

6 September 1992 4	Northampton Town	1–1	Hereford United	Northampton
14:00 BST	S.Beavon (pen.)			Stadium: County Ground; Attendance: 2,668

12 September 1992 5	Northampton Town	1–0	Scunthorpe United	Northampton
14:00 BST	K.Wilkin			Stadium: County Ground; Attendance: 1,961

15 September 1992 6	Barnet	3–0	Northampton Town	Barnet
19:45 BST				Stadium: Underhill; Attendance: 2,885

19 September 1992 7	Torquay United	1–0	Northampton Town	Torquay
15:00 BST				Stadium: Plainmoor; Attendance: 2,393

26 September 1992 8	Northampton Town	2–5	Halifax Town	Northampton
15:00 BST	K.Wilkin; S.Brown			Stadium: County Ground; Attendance: 2,021

3 October 1992 9	Northampton Town	0–2	Lincoln City	Northampton
15:00 BST				Stadium: County Ground; Attendance: 1,929

10 October 1992 10	Scarborough	4–2	Northampton Town	Scarborough
15:00 BST			S.Terry; M.Aldridge	Stadium: Athletic Ground; Attendance: 1,539

13 October 1992 11	Northampton Town	0–1	Chesterfield	Northampton
19:30 BST				Stadium: County Ground; Attendance: 1,922

17 October 1992 12	Northampton Town	0–1	Doncaster Rovers	Northampton
15:00 BST				Stadium: County Ground; Attendance: 2,138

24 October 1992 13	Wrexham	0–1	Northampton Town	Wrexham, Wales
15:00 BST			M.Bell; I.McParland (red card)	Stadium: Racecourse Ground; Attendance: 3,095

31 October 1992 14	Northampton Town	0–0	Shrewsbury Town	Northampton
15:00 GMT				Stadium: County Ground; Attendance: 2,730

3 November 1992 15	Northampton Town	1–2	Darlington	Northampton
19:30 GMT	K.Wilkin			Stadium: County Ground; Attendance: 1,991

21 November 1992 16	Northampton Town	4–3	York City	Northampton
15:00 GMT	T.Angus; P.Curtis; S.Terry; P.Chard		W.Hall; I.Blackstone	Stadium: County Ground; Attendance: 2,812

28 November 1992 17	Carlisle United	2–0	Northampton Town	Carlisle
15:00 GMT				Stadium: Brunton Park; Attendance: 3,607

12 December 1992 18	Bury	3–3	Northampton Town	Bury
15:00 GMT			I.McParland; S.Terry; M.Bell	Stadium: Gigg Lane; Attendance: 1,954

26 December 1992 19	Northampton Town	1–0	Colchester United	Northampton
15:00 GMT	I.McParland 23'	Report		Stadium: County Ground; Attendance: 4,962; Referee: Kelvin Morton

28 December 1992 20	Walsall	2–0	Northampton Town	Walsall
15:00 GMT				Stadium: Bescot Stadium; Attendance: 5,080

8 January 1993 21	Northampton Town	1–1	Barnet	Northampton
19:30 GMT	K.Wilkin			Stadium: County Ground; Attendance: 4,253

16 January 1993 22	Halifax Town	2–2	Northampton Town	Halifax
15:00 GMT			D.Harmon; I.McParland (red card)	Stadium: The Shay; Attendance: 1,323

23 January 1993 23	Northampton Town	0–1	Torquay United	Northampton
15:00 GMT				Stadium: County Ground; Attendance: 3,082

26 January 1993 24	Northampton Town	0–2	Crewe Alexandra	Northampton
19:30 GMT				Stadium: County Ground; Attendance: 2,510

30 January 1993 25	Chesterfield	1–3	Northampton Town	Chesterfield
15:00 GMT	S.Norris		P.Chard; S.Terry; M.Scott	Stadium: Saltergate; Attendance: 3,031

6 February 1993 26	Northampton Town	2–2	Gillingham	Northampton
15:00 GMT	S.Brown; M.Bell		P.Baker; P.Ritchie	Stadium: County Ground; Attendance: 3,812

13 February 1993 27	Hereford United	3–2	Northampton Town	Hereford
15:00 GMT			S.Young; P.Chard	Stadium: Edgar Street; Attendance: 2,358

19 February 1993 28	Northampton Town	1–2	Cardiff City	Northampton
19:30 GMT	S.Brown (pen.)		P.Stant; C.Pike	Stadium: County Ground; Attendance: 4,522

27 February 1993 29	Northampton Town	1–3	Scarborough	Northampton
15:00 GMT	M.Bell			Stadium: County Ground; Attendance: 2,455

6 March 1993 30	Lincoln City	2–0	Northampton Town	Lincoln
15:00 GMT				Stadium: Sincil Bank; Attendance: 3,328

9 March 1993 31	Rochdale	0–3	Northampton Town	Rochdale
19:30 GMT			P.Chard 7'; S.Brown 15'; S.Young 21'	Stadium: Spotland; Attendance: 1,446

20 March 1993 32	Darlington	3–1	Northampton Town	Darlington
15:00 GMT			M.Bell	Stadium: Feethams; Attendance: 2,106

23 March 1993 33	Northampton Town	2–0	Carlisle United	Northampton
19:30 GMT	P.Gavin; T.Angus			Stadium: County Ground; Attendance: 2,561

26 March 1993 34	York City	2–1	Northampton Town	York
19:30 GMT	T.Canham; I.Blackstone		P.Gavin	Stadium: Bootham Crescent; Attendance: 3,334

30 March 1993 35	Scunthorpe United	5–0	Northampton Town	Scunthorpe
19:30 BST				Stadium: Glanford Park; Attendance: 2,307

2 April 1993 36	Northampton Town	1–0	Rochdale	Northampton
19:30 BST	S.Brown 67'			Stadium: County Ground; Attendance: 3,037

6 April 1993 37	Northampton Town	1–0	Bury	Northampton
19:30 BST	W.Hawke			Stadium: County Ground; Attendance: 2,878

12 April 1993 38	Northampton Town	0–0	Walsall	Northampton
15:00 BST				Stadium: County Ground; Attendance: 4,177

20 April 1993 39	Colchester United	2–0	Northampton Town	Colchester
19:45 BST	S.Ball 62' (pen.); P.Abrahams 90'	Report	S.Brown (red card) 83'	Stadium: Layer Road; Attendance: 3,519; Referee: Roger Wiseman

24 April 1993 40	Doncaster Rovers	2–2	Northampton Town	Doncaster
15:00 BST			S.Brown; M.Aldridge	Stadium: Belle Vue; Attendance: 2,111

27 April 1993 41	Northampton Town	0–2	Wrexham	Northampton
19:30 BST				Stadium: County Ground; Attendance: 7,504

8 May 1993 42	Shrewsbury Town	2–3	Northampton Town	Shrewsbury
15:00 BST	T.Lynch 24'; C.Griffiths 29'	Report	P.Chard 51'; P.Gavin 72', 84'	Stadium: Gay Meadow; Attendance: 7,278 (2,000+)

=== FA Cup ===
14 November 1992 First round	Northampton Town	3–1	Fulham	Northampton
15:00 GMT	S.Terry; S.Brown; K.Wilkin			Stadium: County Ground; Attendance: 4,823

6 December 1992 Second round	Bath City	2–2	Northampton Town	Bath
15:00 GMT			S.Brown; P.Chard	Stadium: Twerton Park; Attendance: 3,626

15 December 1992 Second round (r)	Northampton Town	3–0	Bath City	Northampton
19:30 GMT	M.Bell; K.Wilkin; I.McPharland			Stadium: County Ground; Attendance: 4,106

12 January 1993 Third round	Northampton Town	0–1	Rotherham United	Northampton
15:00 GMT				Stadium: County Ground; Attendance: 7,256

=== League Cup ===
18 August 1992 First round 1st leg	Gillingham	2–1	Northampton Town	Gillingham
19:45 BST	D.Crown; S.Lovell		(o.g.)	Stadium: Priestfield; Attendance: 2,245

9 September 1992 First round 2nd leg	Northampton Town	0–2	Gillingham	Northampton
19:30 BST			D.Crown; T.Aylott	Stadium: County Ground; Attendance: 2,390

=== League Trophy ===
Group 1
Team	Pld	W	D	L	GF	GA	GD	Pts	Qualification
Northampton Town	2	2	0	0	4	2	+2	6	Qualified for next round
Barnet	2	1	0	1	5	4	+1	3	Qualified for next round
Colchester United	2	0	0	2	3	6	−3	0	

1 December 1992 Group 1 (s)	Colchester United	1–2	Northampton Town	Colchester
19:45 GMT	M.Grainger 27' (pen.)	Report	S.Beavon 45' (pen.); S.Brown 63'	Stadium: Layer Road; Attendance: 1,454; Referee: David Axcell

9 December 1992 Group 1 (s)	Northampton Town	2–1	Barnet	Northampton
19:30 GMT	M.Scott; I.McPharland			Stadium: County Ground; Attendance: 1,591

18 January 1993 Second round (s)	Northampton Town	4–0	Hereford United	Northampton
19:30 GMT	M.Bell; M.Scott; I.McPharland			Stadium: County Ground; Attendance: 1,962

2 February 1993 Quarter-final (s)	Port Vale	4–2	Northampton Town	Burslem
19:45 GMT			M.Scott; P.Chard	Stadium: Vale Park; Attendance: 4,834

=== Appearances and goals ===
Pos	Player	Division Three			FA Cup			League Cup			League Trophy			Total		
Pos	Player	Starts	Sub	Goals	Starts	Sub	Goals	Starts	Sub	Goals	Starts	Sub	Goals	Starts	Sub	Goals
GK	Barry Richardson	42	–	–	4	–	–	2	–	–	4	–	–	52	–	–
DF	Craig Adams	–	–	–	–	–	–	–	–	–	–	–	–	–	–	–
DF	Terry Angus	36	1	2	4	–	–	2	–	–	4	–	–	46	1	2
DF	Jason Burnham	28	3	–	4	–	–	1	1	–	4	–	–	37	4	–
DF	Lee Colkin	12	1	–	–	–	–	1	–	–	–	–	–	13	1	–
DF	Paul Curtis	22	–	1	4	–	–	–	–	–	4	–	–	30	–	1
DF	Ken Gillard	9	–	–	–	–	–	–	–	–	–	–	–	9	–	–
DF	Mark Parsons	19	–	–	1	–	–	1	–	–	1	1	–	22	1	–
DF	Richard Preston	–	–	–	–	–	–	–	–	–	–	–	–	–	–	–
DF	Scott Stackman	–	–	–	–	–	–	–	–	–	–	–	–	–	–	–
DF	Steve Terry	42	–	5	4	–	1	2	–	–	4	–	–	52	–	6
MF	Stuart Beavon	21	3	1	3	–	–	2	–	–	3	1	1	29	4	2
MF	Micky Bell	34	5	5	4	–	1	2	–	–	3	1	1	43	6	7
MF	Steve Brown	38	–	9	4	–	2	2	–	–	3	–	1	47	–	12
MF	Phil Chard	29	5	6	2	1	1	1	1	–	1	–	1	33	7	8
MF	Darren Harmon	22	3	1	3	–	–	–	–	–	4	–	–	29	3	1
FW	Pat Gavin	13	1	4	–	–	–	–	–	–	–	–	–	13	1	4
FW	Martin Aldridge	7	2	2	–	–	–	–	1	–	–	–	–	7	3	2
FW	Riccardo Bulzis	–	–	–	–	–	–	–	–	–	–	–	–	–	–	–
FW	Kevin Wilkin	34	7	4	4	–	2	2	–	–	3	1	–	43	8	6
FW	Stuart Young	7	1	2	–	–	–	–	–	–	–	–	–	7	1	2
Players who left before end of season:
DF	Matthew Fox	–	1	–	–	–	–	–	–	–	–	–	–	–	1	–
MF	James Benton	2	3	–	–	–	–	–	–	–	1	1	–	3	4	–
MF	Paul Lamb	2	1	–	–	–	–	1	–	–	–	–	–	3	1	–
MF	Sean Parker	–	–	–	–	–	–	–	–	–	–	–	–	–	–	–
FW	Warren Hawke	7	–	1	–	–	–	–	–	–	–	–	–	7	–	1
FW	Ian McParland	11	–	3	3	–	1	–	–	–	3	–	3	17	–	7
FW	Morrys Scott	10	7	2	–	1	–	2	–	–	2	1	3	14	9	5
FW	Paul Tisdale	5	–	–	–	–	–	–	–	–	–	–	–	5	–	–
