= 1993–94 Northampton Town F.C. season =

Northampton Town
1993–94 season
- Chairman: Barry Ward
- Manager: Phil Chard (until September); John Barnwell
- Stadium: County Ground
- Division Three: 22nd
- FA Cup: First round
- League Cup: First round
- League Trophy: Second round
- Top goalscorer: League: Ian Gilzean (10); All: Martin Aldridge (11)
- Highest home attendance: 6,432 vs Chester City
- Lowest home attendance: 1,062 vs Hereford United
- Average home league attendance: 3,454

The 1993–94 season was Northampton Town's 97th season in their history and the fourth successive season in the Third Division. Alongside competing in Division Three, the club also participated in the FA Cup, League Cup and Football League Trophy.

== Players ==
As of match played 7 May 1994.

Name	Position	Nat.	Place of birth	Date of birth	Apps	Goals	Signed from	Date signed	Fee
Goalkeepers
Barry Richardson	GK	(England)	Wallsend	5 August 1969 (aged 24)	113	0	Stockport County	September 1991	Free
Steve Sherwood	GK	(England)	Selby	10 December 1953 (aged 40)	20	0	Shrewsbury Town	August 1993	Free
Defenders
Jason Burnham	LB	(England)	Mansfield	8 May 1973 (aged 20)	108	2	Apprentice	July 1991	N/A
Lee Colkin	LB	(England)	Nuneaton	15 July 1974 (aged 19)	53	2	Apprentice	31 August 1992	N/A
Terry Fleming	RB/CM	(England)	Marston Green	5 January 1973 (aged 21)	35	1	Coventry City	August 1993	Free
Bernie Gallacher	LB	(Scotland)	Johnstone	22 March 1967 (aged 27)	5	0	Brighton & Hove Albion	January 1994	Free
Steve Terry (c)	CB	(England)	Clapton	14 June 1962 (aged 31)	211	18	Hull City	March 1990	£70,000
Ray Warburton	CB	(England)	Rotherham	7 October 1967 (aged 26)	17	1	York City	4 February 1994	£35,000
Midfielders
Micky Bell	W	(England)	Newcastle-upon-Tyne	15 November 1971 (aged 22)	164	11	Apprentice	April 1990	N/A
Phil Chard	U	(England)	Corby	16 October 1960 (aged 33)	331	54	Wolverhampton Wanderers	October 1989	Free
John Cornwell	CM	(England)	Bethnal Green	13 October 1964 (aged 29)	13	1	Southend United	February 1994	Loan
Efon Elad	W	(England)	Hillingdon	5 September 1970 (aged 23)	10	0	SC Fortuna Köln	January 1994	Free
Paul Fitzpatrick	CM/CB	(England)	Liverpool	5 October 1965 (aged 28)	2	1	Hamilton Academical	February 1994	Free
Darren Harmon	CM	(England)	Northampton	30 January 1973 (aged 21)	67	8	Shrewsbury Town	24 October 1992	Free
Gary Harrison	MF	(England)	Northampton	12 March 1975 (aged 19)	2	0	Apprentice	December 1993	N/A
Les Phillips	CM	(England)	Lambeth	7 January 1963 (aged 31)	32	0	Oxford United	July 1993	Free
Forwards
Martin Aldridge	FW	(England)	Northampton	6 December 1974 (aged 19)	48	13	Apprentice	27 August 1993	N/A
Ian Gilzean	FW	(Scotland)	Enfield (ENG)	10 December 1969 (aged 24)	39	10	Dundee	August 1993	Free
Warren Patmore	FW	(England)	London	14 August 1971 (aged 22)	17	2	Millwall	December 1993	Free
Kevin Wilkin	FW	(England)	Cambridge	1 October 1967 (aged 26)	87	13	Cambridge City	August 1990	Free

== Competitions ==
=== Division Three ===
==== League table ====
Pos	Team	Pld	W	D	L	GF	GA	GD	Pts	Promotion or relegation
18	Lincoln City	42	12	11	19	52	63	−11	47	
19	Wigan Athletic	42	11	12	19	51	70	−19	45	
20	Hereford United	42	12	6	24	60	79	−19	42	
21	Darlington	42	10	11	21	42	64	−22	41	
22	Northampton Town	42	9	11	22	44	66	−22	38	Reprived from relegation

==== Results summary ====
Overall								Home						Away					
Pld	W	D	L	GF	GA	GD	Pts	W	D	L	GF	GA	GD	W	D	L	GF	GA	GD
42	9	11	22	44	66	−22	38	6	7	8	25	23	+2	3	4	14	19	43	−24

Last updated: 26 April 2022.

==== League position by match ====
Round	1	2	3	4	5	6	7	8	9	10	11	12	13	14	15	16	17	18	19	20	21	22	23	24	25	26	27	28	29	30	31	32	33	34	35	36	37	38	39	40	41	42
Ground	A	A	A	H	A	H	A	H	H	H	A	H	A	A	H	A	H	A	H	A	A	H	A	A	H	A	H	H	A	H	H	A	H	H	A	H	A	H	H	A	H	A
Result	D	L	L	L	D	L	L	W	D	W	L	D	L	L	L	L	D	L	L	L	L	D	L	L	D	W	W	D	W	L	W	D	W	D	W	L	D	L	L	L	W	L
Position	14	19	20	22	22	22	22	21	21	19	21	21	21	21	21	22	22	22	22	22	22	22	22	22	22	22	22	22	22	22	22	22	22	22	20	20	19	21	21	21	21	22

Source: 11v11.com
A = Away; H = Home; W = Win; D = Draw; L = Loss

==== Matches ====
Win Draw Loss

14 August 1993 1	Bury	0–0	Northampton Town	Bury
15:00 BST				Stadium: Gigg Lane; Attendance: 2,540

28 August 1993 2	Colchester United	3–2	Northampton Town	Colchester
15:00 BST	M.Grainger 34' (pen.); T.English 41'; M.Kinsella 71'	Report	S.Brown 5'; I.Gilzean 35'	Stadium: Layer Road; Attendance: 2,874; Referee: Mike Bailey

31 August 1993 3	Crewe Alexandra	3–1	Northampton Town	Crewe
19:30 BST	A.Ward; T.Naylor; D.Rowbotham		I.Gilzean	Stadium: Gresty Road; Attendance: 3,002

4 September 1993 4	Northampton Town	0–1	Walsall	Northampton
15:00 BST			R.McDonald	Stadium: County Ground; Attendance: 3,278

11 September 1993 5	Hereford United	1–1	Northampton Town	Hereford
15:00 BST	M.Nicholson		I.Gilzean	Stadium: Edgar Street; Attendance: 2,260

18 September 1993 6	Northampton Town	0–2	Wigan Athletic	Northampton
15:00 BST			P.Gavin; P.Skipper	Stadium: County Ground; Attendance: 2,281

25 September 1993 7	Lincoln City	4–3	Northampton Town	Lincoln
15:00 BST	D.West; G.Jones; D.Johnson; D.Puttnam		M.Aldridge; S.Brown; D.Harmon	Stadium: Sincil Bank; Attendance: 2,705

2 October 1993 8	Northampton Town	1–0	Darlington	Northampton
15:00 BST	M.Aldridge			Stadium: County Ground; Attendance: 2,268

9 October 1993 9	Northampton Town	1–1	Wycombe Wanderers	Northampton
15:00 BST	M.Aldridge		S.Guppy	Stadium: County Ground; Attendance: 5,414

12 October 1993 10	Northampton Town	5–1	Mansfield Town	Northampton
19:30 BST	I.Gilzean; D.Harmon; S.Terry; S.Brown		P.McLoughlin	Stadium: County Ground; Attendance: 2,842

16 October 1993 11	Scunthorpe United	7–0	Northampton Town	Scunthorpe
15:00 BST	M.Carmichael; M.Elliott; I.Thompstone; A.Toman; M.Smith			Stadium: Glanford Park; Attendance: 2,814

23 October 1993 12	Northampton Town	1–1	Carlisle United	Northampton
15:00 BST	M.Aldridge		D.Edmondson	Stadium: County Ground; Attendance: 2,886

30 October 1993 13	Doncaster Rovers	2–1	Northampton Town	Doncaster
15:00 GMT	D.Roche		I.Gilzean	Stadium: Belle Vue; Attendance: 2,227

2 November 1993 14	Torquay United	2–0	Northampton Town	Torquay
19:30 GMT		A.Foster; D.O'Riordan		Stadium: Plainmoor; Attendance: 2,704

6 November 1993 15	Northampton Town	0–3	Shrewsbury Town	Northampton
15:00 GMT			D.Spink; T.Lynch	Stadium: County Ground; Attendance: 2,639

20 November 1993 16	Chester City	1–0	Northampton Town	Chester
15:00 GMT	D.Pugh			Stadium: Deva Stadium; Attendance: 2,650

27 November 1993 17	Northampton Town	2–2	Chesterfield	Northampton
15:00 GMT	I.Gilzean; M.Aldridge		S.Norris; A.Morris	Stadium: County Ground; Attendance: 1,866

11 December 1993 18	Mansfield Town	1–0	Northampton Town	Mansfield
15:00 GMT	P.Holland			Stadium: Field Mill; Attendance: 2,391

18 December 1993 19	Northampton Town	0–1	Bury	Northampton
15:00 GMT			T.Rigby	Stadium: County Ground; Attendance: 2,369

27 December 1993 20	Gillingham	1–0	Northampton Town	Gillingham
15:00 GMT	S.Terry o.g.'			Stadium: Priestfield; Attendance: 4,573

1 January 1994 21	Rochdale	6–2	Northampton Town	Rochdale
15:00 GMT	D.Lancaster 9', 40', 74'; S.Whitehall 44'; M.Stuart 82'; J.Taylor 83'		I.Gilzean 66'; D.Harmon 78'	Stadium: Spotland; Attendance: 2,453

3 January 1994 22	Northampton Town	2–2	Crewe Alexandra	Northampton
15:00 GMT	I.Gilzean; L.Colkin		T.Naylor; S.Smith	Stadium: County Ground; Attendance: 3,404

8 January 1994 23	Scarborough	2–1	Northampton Town	Scarborough
15:00 GMT	A.Toman; C.Whitington		I.Gilzean	Stadium: Athletic Ground; Attendance: 1,703

22 January 1994 24	Wycombe Wanderers	1–0	Northampton Town	High Wycombe
15:00 GMT	S.Guppy			Stadium: Adams Park; Attendance: 6,737

29 January 1994 25	Northampton Town	0–0	Doncaster Rovers	Northampton
15:00 GMT				Stadium: County Ground; Attendance: 2,900

5 February 1994 26	Carlisle United	0–1	Northampton Town	Carlisle
15:00 GMT			P.Chard	Stadium: Brunton Park; Attendance: 4,535

12 February 1994 27	Northampton Town	3–2	Scarborough	Northampton
15:00 GMT	D.Harmon; P.Fitzpatrick; I.Gilzean		S.Murray; C.Whitington	Stadium: County Ground; Attendance: 2,974

19 February 1993 28	Northampton Town	1–1	Colchester United	Northampton
15:00 GMT	K.Wilkin 19'	Report	R.McDonough 24'; C.Hyslop (red card) 7'	Stadium: County Ground; Attendance: 3,185; Referee: Terry Lunt

26 February 1994 29	Walsall	1–3	Northampton Town	Walsall
15:00 GMT	K.Lightbourne		D.Harmon; K.Wilkin; W.Patmore	Stadium: Bescot Stadium; Attendance: 4,553

5 March 1994 30	Northampton Town	0–1	Hereford United	Northampton
15:00 GMT			C.Pike	Stadium: County Ground; Attendance: 5,394

8 March 1994 31	Northampton Town	4–0	Scunthorpe United	Northampton
19:30 GMT	D.Harmon; T.Fleming pen.' M.Aldridge; K.Wilkin			Stadium: County Ground; Attendance: 3,192
Note: Fixture was previously postponed on January 15, 1994 due to a waterlogged pitch.

12 March 1994 32	Wigan Athletic	1–1	Northampton Town	Wigan
15:00 GMT	M.Wright		J.Cornwell	Stadium: Springfield Park; Attendance: 1,855

15 March 1994 33	Northampton Town	2–0	Preston North End	Northampton
19:30 GMT	A.Fensome o.g.' M.Aldridge			Stadium: County Ground; Attendance: 3,845
Note: Fixture was previously postponed on December 29, 1993 due to an unfit pitch and fear of more rain.

19 March 1994 34	Northampton Town	0–0	Lincoln City	Northampton
15:00 GMT				Stadium: County Ground; Attendance: 3,868

26 March 1994 35	Darlington	0–1	Northampton Town	Darlington
15:00 GMT			R.Warburton	Stadium: Feethams; Attendance: 3,226

2 April 1994 36	Northampton Town	1–2	Gillingham	Northampton
15:00 BST	W.Patmore		R.Carpenter; N.Forster	Stadium: County Ground; Attendance: 4,628

4 April 1994 37	Preston North End	1–1	Northampton Town	Preston
15:00 BST	G.Ainsworth		D.Harmon	Stadium: Deepdale; Attendance: 7,517

9 April 1994 38	Northampton Town	1–2	Rochdale	Northampton
15:00 BST	M.Aldridge 64'		M.Stuart 43'; J.Bowden 74'	Stadium: County Ground; Attendance: 3,330

16 April 1994 39	Northampton Town	0–1	Torquay United	Northampton
15:00 BST			D.Darby	Stadium: County Ground; Attendance: 3,519

23 April 1994 40	Shrewsbury Town	2–1	Northampton Town	Shrewsbury
15:00 BST	W.Clarke; R.Woods		K.Wilkin	Stadium: Gay Meadow; Attendance: 6,512

30 April 1994 41	Northampton Town	1–0	Chester City	Northampton
15:00 BST	K.Wilkin			Stadium: County Ground; Attendance: 6,432

7 May 1994 42	Chesterfield	4–0	Northampton Town	Chesterfield
15:00 BST	J.Hewitt; K.Davies; T.Curtis			Stadium: Saltergate; Attendance: 5,285

=== FA Cup ===
13 November 1993 First round	Northampton Town	1–2	Bromsgrove Rovers	Northampton
15:00 GMT	M.Aldridge			Stadium: County Ground; Attendance: 3,382

=== League Cup ===
18 August 1993 First round 1st leg	Reading	3–0	Northampton Town	Reading
19:45 BST	J.Quinn; S.Lovell; P.Parkinson			Stadium: Elm Park; Attendance: 3,283

7 September 1993 First round 2nd leg	Northampton Town	0–2	Reading	Northampton
19:30 BST			K.Dillon; A.Gray	Stadium: County Ground; Attendance: 1,631

=== League Trophy ===
Group 3
Team	Pld	W	D	L	GF	GA	GD	Pts	Qualification
Hereford United	2	1	1	0	2	1	+1	4	Qualified for next round
Northampton Town	2	0	2	0	1	1	0	2	Qualified for next round
Walsall	2	0	1	1	0	1	−1	1	

19 October 1993 Group 3 (s)	Walsall	0–0	Northampton Town	Walsall
19:45 BST				Stadium: Bescot Stadium; Attendance: 1,897

9 November 1993 Group 3 (s)	Northampton Town	1–1	Hereford United	Northampton
19:30 GMT	M.Aldridge			Stadium: County Ground; Attendance: 1,062

1 December 1993 Second round (s)	Reading	4–1	Northampton Town	Reading
19:45 GMT			M.Aldridge	Stadium: Elm Park; Attendance: 1,811

=== Appearances and goals ===
Pos	Player	Division Three			FA Cup			League Cup			League Trophy			Total		
Pos	Player	Starts	Sub	Goals	Starts	Sub	Goals	Starts	Sub	Goals	Starts	Sub	Goals	Starts	Sub	Goals
GK	Barry Richardson	27	–	–	–	–	–	1	–	–	1	–	–	29	–	–
GK	Steve Sherwood	15	1	–	1	–	–	1	–	–	2	–	–	19	1	–
DF	Jason Burnham	15	2	–	1	–	–	1	1	–	1	–	–	18	3	–
DF	Lee Colkin	17	3	1	–	–	–	1	–	–	–	–	–	18	3	1
DF	Terry Fleming	26	5	1	–	1	–	2	–	–	–	1	–	28	7	1
DF	Bernie Gallacher	5	–	–	–	–	–	–	–	–	–	–	–	5	–	–
DF	Steve Terry	39	–	1	1	–	–	2	–	–	3	–	–	45	–	1
DF	Ray Warburton	17	–	1	–	–	–	–	–	–	–	–	–	17	–	1
MF	Micky Bell	37	1	–	1	–	–	2	–	–	3	–	–	43	1	–
MF	Phil Chard	25	3	1	1	–	–	1	–	–	3	–	–	30	3	1
MF	John Cornwell	13	–	1	–	–	–	–	–	–	–	–	–	13	–	1
MF	Efon Elad	8	2	–	–	–	–	–	–	–	–	–	–	8	2	–
MF	Paul Fitzpatrick	1	1	1	–	–	–	–	–	–	–	–	–	1	1	1
MF	Darren Harmon	28	3	7	1	–	–	–	1	–	2	–	–	31	4	7
MF	Gary Harrison	2	–	–	–	–	–	–	–	–	–	–	–	2	–	–
MF	Les Phillips	26	–	–	1	–	–	2	–	–	3	–	–	32	–	–
FW	Martin Aldridge	23	5	8	1	–	1	–	1	–	3	–	2	27	6	11
FW	Ian Gilzean	29	4	10	1	–	–	2	–	–	3	–	–	35	4	10
FW	Warren Patmore	11	6	2	–	–	–	–	–	–	–	–	–	11	6	2
FW	Kevin Wilkin	24	–	5	–	–	–	–	–	–	–	–	–	24	–	5
Players who left before end of season:
DF	Ken Gillard	13	1	–	1	–	–	1	–	–	3	–	–	18	1	–
DF	Chris Hyslop	8	–	–	–	–	–	–	–	–	–	–	–	8	–	–
DF	Mark Parsons	19	–	–	1	–	–	2	–	–	2	–	–	24	–	–
DF	Richard Preston	1	–	–	–	–	–	–	–	–	–	–	–	1	–	–
DF	Ian Sampson	8	–	–	–	–	–	–	–	–	–	–	–	8	–	–
DF	Scott Stackman	–	1	–	–	–	–	–	–	–	–	–	–	–	1	–
DF	Darren Wood	1	–	–	–	–	–	1	–	–	–	–	–	2	–	–
MF	Steve Brown	24	–	4	–	–	–	2	–	–	3	–	–	29	–	4
FW	Sean Francis	–	1	–	–	–	–	–	–	–	–	–	–	–	1	–
