= 1991–92 Northampton Town F.C. season =

Northampton Town
1991–92 season
- Chairman: Michael McRitchie
- Manager: Theo Foley (until April); Phil Chard
- Stadium: County Ground
- Division Four: 16th
- FA Cup: First round
- Rumbelows Cup: First round
- Autoglass Trophy: First round
- Top goalscorer: League: Tony Adcock (7); All: Tony Adcock (9)
- Highest home attendance: 4,344 vs Barnet
- Lowest home attendance: 1,193 vs Leyton Orient
- Average home league attendance: 2,789

The 1991–92 season was Northampton Town's 95th season in their history and the second successive season in the Fourth Division. Alongside competing in Division Four, the club also participated in the FA Cup, League Cup and Associate Members' Cup.

== Players ==
As of match played 28 April 1992.

Name	Position	Nat.	Place of birth	Date of birth	Apps	Goals	Signed from	Date signed	Fee
Goalkeepers
Barry Richardson	GK	(England)	Wallsend	5 August 1969 (aged 22)	32	0	Stockport County	September 1991	Free
Defenders
Craig Adams	CB	(England)	Northampton	15 February 1974 (aged 18)	1	0	Apprentice	April 1992	N/A
Terry Angus	CB	(England)	Coventry	14 January 1966 (aged 26)	91	4	VS Rugby	July 1990	
Jason Burnham	LB	(England)	Mansfield	8 May 1973 (aged 18)	46	2	Apprentice	July 1991	N/A
Lee Colkin	LB	(England)	Nuneaton	15 July 1974 (aged 17)	3	0	Apprentice	February 1992	N/A
Mark Parsons	RB	(England)	Luton	24 February 1975 (aged 17)	13	0	Apprentice	February 1992	N/A
Steve Terry	CB	(England)	Clapton	14 June 1962 (aged 29)	114	11	Hull City	March 1990	£70,000
Midfielders
Stuart Beavon (c)	CM	(England)	Wolverhampton	30 November 1958 (aged 33)	86	16	Reading	July 1990	Part Exchange
Micky Bell	W	(England)	Newcastle upon Tyne	15 November 1971 (aged 20)	71	4	Apprentice	April 1990	N/A
James Benton	CM	(Republic of Ireland)	Wexford	9 April 1975 (aged 17)	4	1	Apprentice	April 1992	N/A
Steve Brown	CM	(England)	Northampton	6 July 1966 (aged 25)	129	10	Irthlingborough Diamonds	21 July 1989	Free
Phil Chard	U	(England)	Corby	16 October 1960 (aged 31)	259	45	Wolverhampton Wanderers	October 1989	Free
Sean Parker	CM	(England)	Newcastle upon Tyne	23 August 1973 (aged 18)	5	0	Apprentice	February 1992	N/A
Forwards
Martin Aldridge	FW	(England)	Northampton	6 December 1974 (aged 17)	5	0	Apprentice	April 1992	N/A
Riccardo Bulzis	FW	(England)	Bedford	22 November 1974 (aged 17)	4	0	Apprentice	April 1992	N/A
Daniel Kiernan	FW	(Scotland)	Northampton (ENG)	16 December 1973 (aged 18)	9	0	Apprentice	February 1992	N/A

== Competitions ==
=== Barclays League Division Four ===
==== League table ====
Pos	Team	Pld	W	D	L	GF	GA	GD	Pts	Promotion or relegation
14	Wrexham	42	14	9	19	52	73	−21	51	Qualification for the Third Division (Note: From the 1992–93 season, the third tier - then known as the Third Division - was renamed to the Second Division, and the fourth tier - then known as the Fourth Division - was renamed to the Third Division.)
15	Walsall	42	12	13	17	48	58	−10	49	Qualification for the Third Division
16	Northampton Town	42	11	13	18	46	57	−11	46	Qualification for the Third Division
17	Hereford United	42	12	8	22	44	57	−13	44	Qualification for the Third Division
18	Maidstone United	42	8	18	16	45	56	−11	42	Qualification for the Third Division

==== Results summary ====
Overall								Home						Away					
Pld	W	D	L	GF	GA	GD	Pts	W	D	L	GF	GA	GD	W	D	L	GF	GA	GD
42	11	13	18	46	57	−11	46	5	9	7	25	23	+2	6	4	11	21	34	−13

Last updated: 10 November 2023.

==== League position by match ====
Round	1	2	3	4	5	6	7	8	9	10	11	12	13	14	15	16	17	18	19	20	21	22	23	24	25	26	27	28	29	30	31	32	33	34	35	36	37	38	39	40	41	42
Ground	A	A	H	H	A	A	H	H	A	H	H	A	A	H	H	A	H	H	A	H	H	A	H	A	A	H	A	H	A	H	H	A	H	A	H	H	A	H	A	A	A	A
Result	W	D	W	D	L	D	D	D	L	D	L	L	L	L	W	L	L	W	W	W	D	W	D	D	W	D	L	L	D	L	W	L	L	W	D	D	L	L	L	L	L	W
Position	9	6	5	8	9	10	9	12	14	13	14	14	18	18	16	16	18	15	13	13	13	11	11	11	9	10	10	11	13	14	12	13	14	13	15	15	15	16	16	17	17	16

Source: 11v11.com
A = Away; H = Home; W = Win; D = Draw; L = Loss

==== Matches ====
Win Draw Loss

17 August 1991 1	Halifax Town	0–1	Northampton Town	Halifax
15:00 BST			P.Chard	Stadium: The Shay; Attendance: 1,834

30 August 1991 2	Wrexham	2–2	Northampton Town	Wrexham, Wales
19:30 BST			T.Angus; A.Thorpe	Stadium: Racecourse Ground; Attendance: 2,196

3 September 1991 3	Northampton Town	3–1	Doncaster Rovers	Northampton
19:30 BST	B.Ormsby o.g.' A.Thorpe; S.Brown			Stadium: County Ground; Attendance: 2,742

7 September 1991 4	Northampton Town	1–1	Barnet	Northampton
15:00 BST	B.Barnes			Stadium: County Ground; Attendance: 4,344

14 September 1991 5	Rochdale	1–0	Northampton Town	Rochdale
15:00 BST	A.Milner 67'			Stadium: Spotland; Attendance: 2,631; Referee: John Kirkby

17 September 1991 6	Crewe Alexandra	1–1	Northampton Town	Crewe
19:30 BST			S.Farrell pen.' T.Angus (red card)	Stadium: Gresty Road; Attendance: 3,597

21 September 1991 7	Northampton Town	2–2	Carlisle United	Northampton
15:00 BST	P.Wilson; B.Barnes			Stadium: County Ground; Attendance: 2,657

5 October 1991 8	Northampton Town	1–1	Blackpool	Northampton
15:00 BST	B.Barnes 64'		T.Sinclair 5'	Stadium: County Ground; Attendance: 3,318

17 September 1991 9	Scarborough	2–1	Northampton Town	Scarborough
15:00 BST			T.Adcock	Stadium: Athletic Ground; Attendance: 2,023

15 October 1991 10	Northampton Town	1–1	Chesterfield	Northampton
19:30 BST	T.Adcock			Stadium: County Ground; Attendance: 2,430

19 October 1991 11	Northampton Town	0–1	Scunthorpe United	Northampton
15:00 BST				Stadium: County Ground; Attendance: 2,583

26 October 1991 12	Gillingham	3–1	Northampton Town	Gillingham
15:00 BST	D.Crown		G.Campbell	Stadium: Priestfield Stadium; Attendance: 2,543

2 November 1991 13	Rotherham United	1–0	Northampton Town	Rotherham
15:00 GMT				Stadium: Millmoor; Attendance: 3,146

5 November 1991 14	Northampton Town	1–2	Mansfield Town	Northampton
19:30 GMT	T.Adcock		G.Fee; T.Angus o.g.'	Stadium: County Ground; Attendance: 2,181

9 November 1991 15	Northampton Town	1–0	Lincoln City	Northampton
15:00 GMT	T.Adcock			Stadium: County Ground; Attendance: 2,575

23 November 1991 16	Cardiff City	3–2	Northampton Town	Cardiff, Wales
15:00 GMT	R.Gibbins 40'; C.Dale 47', 65'		J.Burnham 4', 86'	Stadium: Ninian Park; Attendance: 2,922

30 November 1991 17	Northampton Town	1–2	Burnley	Northampton
15:00 GMT	G.Campbell		M.Conroy 20', 86'	Stadium: County Ground; Attendance: 4,020

7 December 1991 18	Northampton Town	3–2	Scarborough	Northampton
15:00 GMT	B.Barnes; T.Adcock; M.Bell			Stadium: County Ground; Attendance: 1,815

21 December 1991 19	Chesterfield	1–2	Northampton Town	Chesterfield
15:00 GMT			C.McClean; S.Terry	Stadium: Saltergate; Attendance: 3,048

26 December 1991 20	Northampton Town	4–0	Halifax Town	Northampton
15:00 GMT	T.Adcock; P.Chard; B.Barnes			Stadium: County Ground; Attendance: 3,147

28 December 1991 21	Northampton Town	1–1	Wrexham	Northampton
15:00 GMT	T.Angus			Stadium: County Ground; Attendance: 3,209

1 January 1992 22	Doncaster Rovers	0–3	Northampton Town	Doncaster
15:00 GMT			P.Chard; G.Campbell; D.Scope	Stadium: Belle Vue; Attendance: 1,973

11 January 1992 23	Northampton Town	2–2	York City	Northampton
15:00 GMT	S.Terry; B.Barnes			Stadium: County Ground; Attendance: 3,361

18 January 1992 24	Maidstone United	1–1	Northampton Town	Dartford
15:00 GMT			S.Terry	Stadium: Watling Street; Attendance: 1,364

28 January 1992 25	Walsall	1–2	Northampton Town	Walsall
19:45 GMT			S.Beavon	Stadium: Bescot Stadium; Attendance: 2,399
Note: Fixture was previously postponed on December 14, 1991 due to freezing fog.

8 February 1992 26	Northampton Town	0–0	Gillingham	Northampton
15:00 GMT				Stadium: County Ground; Attendance: 3,183

11 February 1992 27	Burnley	5–0	Northampton Town	Burnley
19:30 GMT	J.Deary 35'; R.Eli 50'; M.Conroy 56'; S.Harper 68'; Francis 78'		C.McClean (red card)	Stadium: Turf Moor; Attendance: 8,760

15 February 1992 28	Northampton Town	0–1	Walsall	Northampton
15:00 GMT				Stadium: County Ground; Attendance: 2,480

22 February 1992 29	York City	0–0	Northampton Town	York
15:00 GMT				Stadium: Bootham Crescent; Attendance: 2,065

29 February 1992 30	Northampton Town	0–1	Hereford United	Northampton
15:00 GMT	S.Terry (red card)			Stadium: County Ground; Attendance: 2,430

3 March 1992 31	Northampton Town	1–0	Maidstone United	Northampton
19:30 GMT	S.Brown			Stadium: County Ground; Attendance: 1,784

10 March 1992 32	Mansfield Town	2–0	Northampton Town	Mansfield
19:30 GMT	P.Stant; G.Ford			Stadium: Field Mill; Attendance: 2,854

14 March 1992 33	Northampton Town	1–2	Rotherham United	Northampton
15:00 GMT	S.Brown			Stadium: County Ground; Attendance: 2,561

21 March 1992 34	Lincoln City	1–2	Northampton Town	Lincoln
15:00 GMT			M.Bell; S.Beavon pen.'	Stadium: Sincil Bank; Attendance: 2,486

28 March 1992 35	Northampton Town	0–0	Cardiff City	Northampton
15:00 GMT				Stadium: County Ground; Attendance: 2,678

31 March 1992 36	Northampton Town	2–2	Rochdale	Northampton
19:30 BST	C.McClean; T.Angus (red card)			Stadium: County Ground; Attendance: 2,010

4 April 1992 37	Barnet	3–0	Northampton Town	Chipping Barnet
15:00 BST				Stadium: Underhill; Attendance: 2,816

11 April 1992 38	Northampton Town	0–1	Crewe Alexandra	Northampton
15:00 BST				Stadium: County Ground; Attendance: 3,300

14 April 1992 39	Scunthorpe United	3–0	Northampton Town	Scunthorpe
19:30 BST				Stadium: Glanford Park; Attendance: 2,286
Note: Fixture was previously postponed on December 14, 1991 due to a frozen pitch.

18 April 1992 40	Carlisle United	2–1	Northampton Town	Carlisle
15:00 BST			J.Benton	Stadium: Brunton Park; Attendance: 1,935

25 April 1992 41	Blackpool	1–0	Northampton Town	Blackpool
15:00 BST	D.Bamber 52'			Stadium: Bloomfield Road; Attendance: 5,915

28 April 1992 42	Hereford United	1–2	Northampton Town	Hereford
19:30 BST			M.Bell	Stadium: Edgar Street; Attendance: 1,294

=== FA Cup ===
16 November 1991 First round	Crawley Town	4–2	Northampton Town	Crawley
15:00 GMT			T.Adcock; P.Chard	Stadium: Town Mead; Attendance: 3,370

=== Rumbelows Cup ===
20 August 1991 First round 1st leg	Leyton Orient	5–0	Northampton Town	Leyton, London
19:45 BST				Stadium: Brisbane Road; Attendance: 2,954

10 September 1991 First round 2nd leg	Northampton Town	2–0	Leyton Orient	Northampton
19:30 BST	B.Barnes			Stadium: County Ground; Attendance: 1,437

=== Autoglass Trophy ===
20 November 1991 Prelim round (s)	Reading	0–2	Northampton Town	Reading
19:45 GMT			T.Adcock; C.McClean	Stadium: Elm Park; Attendance: 1,151

3 December 1991 Prelim round (s)	Northampton Town	1–2	Leyton Orient	Northampton
19:30 GMT	P.Chard			Stadium: County Ground; Attendance: 1,193

14 January 1992 First round (s)	Barnet	3–2	Northampton Town	Chipping Barnet
19:45 GMT			A.Thorpe	Stadium: Underhill; Attendance: 1,422

=== Appearances and goals ===
Pos	Player	Division Four			FA Cup			League Cup			League Trophy			Total		
Pos	Player	Starts	Sub	Goals	Starts	Sub	Goals	Starts	Sub	Goals	Starts	Sub	Goals	Starts	Sub	Goals
GK	Barry Richardson	27	–	–	1	–	–	1	–	–	3	–	–	32	–	–
DF	Craig Adams	–	1	–	–	–	–	–	–	–	–	–	–	–	1	–
DF	Terry Angus	37	–	2	1	–	–	2	–	–	3	–	–	43	–	2
DF	Jason Burnham	36	4	2	1	–	–	2	–	–	3	–	–	42	4	2
DF	Lee Colkin	2	1	–	–	–	–	–	–	–	–	–	–	2	1	–
DF	Mark Parsons	13	–	–	–	–	–	–	–	–	–	–	–	13	–	–
DF	Steve Terry	37	–	3	1	–	–	2	–	–	1	–	–	–	–	–
MF	Stuart Beavon	33	–	3	–	–	–	–	–	–	3	–	–	36	–	3
MF	Micky Bell	23	7	4	–	–	–	1	–	–	2	1	–	24	8	4
MF	James Benton	4	1	1	–	–	–	–	–	–	–	–	–	4	1	1
MF	Steve Brown	31	4	3	1	–	–	2	–	–	1	1	–	34	5	3
MF	Phil Chard	29	–	3	1	–	1	2	–	–	2	–	1	34	–	5
MF	Sean Parker	5	1	–	–	–	–	–	–	–	–	–	–	5	1	–
FW	Martin Aldridge	2	3	–	–	–	–	–	–	–	–	–	–	2	3	–
FW	Riccardo Bulzis	1	3	–	–	–	–	–	–	–	–	–	–	1	3	–
FW	Daniel Kiernan	6	3	–	–	–	–	–	–	–	–	–	–	6	3	–
Players who left before end of season:
GK	Marlon Beresford	15	–	–	–	–	–	–	–	–	–	–	–	15	–	–
GK	Peter Gleasure	–	–	–	–	–	–	1	–	–	–	–	–	1	–	–
DF	Irvin Gernon	27	1	–	–	1	–	–	1	–	1	1	–	28	4	–
DF	David Johnson	9	6	–	–	–	–	–	1	–	3	–	–	12	7	–
DF	Paul Wilson	14	2	1	1	–	–	2	–	–	–	1	–	17	3	1
DF	Darren Wood	1	–	–	–	–	–	–	–	–	–	–	–	1	–	–
MF	Sean Farrell	4	–	1	–	–	–	1	–	–	–	–	–	5	–	1
MF	Trevor Quow	24	3	–	1	–	–	2	–	–	2	1	–	29	4	–
MF	David Scope	1	4	1	–	–	–	–	–	–	–	–	–	1	4	1
MF	Aidey Thorpe	11	1	2	–	–	–	1	–	–	1	–	2	13	1	4
FW	Tony Adcock	14	–	7	1	–	1	1	–	–	2	–	1	18	–	9
FW	Bobby Barnes	18	–	6	1	–	–	1	–	2	1	–	–	21	–	8
FW	Greg Campbell	12	10	3	–	1	–	–	1	–	2	1	–	14	13	3
FW	Dean Edwards	7	–	–	–	–	–	–	–	–	–	–	–	7	–	–
FW	Christian McClean	19	–	3	1	–	–	–	–	–	2	–	1	22	–	4
FW	Kevin Wilkin	–	–	–	–	–	–	–	–	–	–	–	–	–	–	–
