= 1995–96 Northampton Town F.C. season =

Northampton Town
1995–96 season
- Chairman: Barry Ward
- Manager: Ian Atkins
- Stadium: Sixfields Stadium
- Division Three: 11th
- FA Cup: Second round
- League Cup: First round
- League Trophy: Quarter-final
- Top goalscorer: League: Jason White (16); All: Jason White (16)
- Highest home attendance: 7,427 vs Gillingham
- Lowest home attendance: 2,109 vs Plymouth Argyle
- Average home league attendance: 4,878

The 1995–96 season was Northampton Town's 99th season in their history and the sixth successive season in the Third Division. Alongside competing in Division Three, the club also participated in the FA Cup, League Cup and Football League Trophy.

== Players ==
As of match played 4 May 1996.

Name	Position	Nat.	Place of birth	Date of birth	Apps	Goals	Signed from	Date signed	Fee
Goalkeepers
Billy Turley	GK	(England)	Wolverhampton	15 July 1973 (aged 22)	2	0	Evesham United	10 July 1995	Free
Andy Woodman	GK	(England)	Camberwell	11 August 1971 (aged 24)	62	0	Exeter City	10 March 1995	Free
Defenders
Lee Colkin	LB	(England)	Nuneaton	15 July 1974 (aged 21)	104	4	Apprentice	31 August 1992	N/A
Lee Maddison	LB	(England)	Bristol	5 October 1972 (aged 23)	25	0	Bristol Rovers	22 September 1995	£25,000
Dave Norton	RB	(England)	Cannock	3 March 1965 (aged 31)	51	0	Hull City	15 August 1994	£25,000
Ian Sampson	CB	(England)	Wakefield	14 November 1968 (aged 27)	93	6	Sunderland	5 August 1994	£30,000
Mark Taylor	LB	(England)	Saltburn-by-the-Sea	8 November 1974 (aged 21)	1	0	Fulham	26 February 1996	Free
Ray Warburton (c)	CB	(England)	Rotherham	7 October 1967 (aged 28)	114	9	York City	4 February 1994	£35,000
Midfielders
Jason Beckford	W	(England)	Manchester	14 February 1970 (aged 26)	4	0	Millwall	15 May 1995	Free
Chris Burns	RM	(England)	Manchester	9 November 1967 (aged 28)	67	10	Swansea City	13 January 1995	Free
Ollie Cahill	LM	(Republic of Ireland)	Clonmel	29 September 1975 (aged 20)	15	1	Clonmel Town	27 September 1994	Free
Neil Doherty	W	(England)	Barrow-in-Furness	21 February 1969 (aged 27)	9	1	Birmingham City	16 February 1996	Loan
Ali Gibb	RM	(England)	Salisbury	17 February 1976 (aged 20)	25	2	Norwich City	5 February 1996	£30,000
Roy Hunter	CM	(England)	Saltburn-by-the-Sea	29 October 1973 (aged 22)	85	7	West Bromwich Albion	2 August 1995	Free
Danny O'Shea	CM	(England)	Newington	26 March 1963 (aged 33)	52	1	Cambridge United	23 March 1995	Free
Dean Peer	CM	(England)	Wordsley	8 August 1969 (aged 26)	50	2	Walsall	22 August 1995	Free
Michael Warner	CM	(England)	Harrogate	17 January 1974 (aged 22)	0	0	Tamworth	31 May 1995	Free
Gareth Williams	RM	(England)	Cowes	12 March 1967 (aged 29)	60	1	AFC Bournemouth	27 September 1994	Free
Forwards
Neil Grayson	FW	(England)	York	1 November 1964 (aged 31)	91	22	Boston United	19 June 1994	Free
Garry Thompson	FW	(England)	Kings Heath	7 October 1959 (aged 36)	51	6	Cardiff City	10 February 1995	Free
Christian Lee	FW	(England)	Aylesbury	8 October 1976 (aged 19)	9	0	Doncaster Rovers	13 July 1995	Free
Gavin Worboys	FW	(England)	Doncaster	14 July 1974 (aged 21)	13	1	Darlington	18 January 1996	Free
Jason White	FW	(England)	Meriden	19 October 1971 (aged 24)	51	16	Scarborough	15 June 1995	£35,000

== Competitions ==
=== Division Three ===
==== League table ====
Pos	Team	Pld	W	D	L	GF	GA	GD	Pts
9	Chester City	46	18	16	12	72	53	+19	70
10	Wigan Athletic	46	20	10	16	62	56	+6	70
11	Northampton Town	46	18	13	15	51	44	+7	67
12	Scunthorpe United	46	15	15	16	67	61	+6	60
13	Doncaster Rovers	46	16	11	19	49	60	−11	59

==== Results summary ====
Overall								Home						Away					
Pld	W	D	L	GF	GA	GD	Pts	W	D	L	GF	GA	GD	W	D	L	GF	GA	GD
46	18	13	15	51	44	+7	67	9	10	4	32	22	+10	9	3	11	19	22	−3

Last updated: 26 April 2020.

==== League position by match ====
Round	1	2	3	4	5	6	7	8	9	10	11	12	13	14	15	16	17	18	19	20	21	22	23	24	25	26	27	28	29	30	31	32	33	34	35	36	37	38	39	40	41	42	43	44	45	46
Ground	H	A	H	A	A	H	H	A	A	H	A	H	A	H	H	A	H	A	H	A	A	H	A	H	A	H	A	H	A	H	H	A	A	H	A	H	H	H	A	A	H	A	H	A	H	A
Result	W	W	D	L	W	D	L	L	L	W	D	W	L	L	L	D	D	L	D	W	L	D	W	W	W	W	D	D	L	W	D	W	L	W	L	D	W	L	W	L	W	W	D	L	D	W
Position	2	2	4	6	3	4	7	11	13	10	11	9	10	12	16	16	16	16	16	13	16	16	14	12	10	9	8	9	11	10	10	9	10	9	10	10	10	10	10	11	11	11	11	11	11	11

Source: 11v11.com
A = Away; H = Home; W = Win; D = Draw; L = Loss

==== Matches ====
Win Draw Loss

12 August 1995 1	Northampton Town	4–1	Bury	Northampton
15:00 BST	N.Grayson; C.Burns (pen.)		P.Stant	Stadium: Sixfields Stadium; Attendance: 4,487

19 August 1995 2	Cardiff City	0–1	Northampton Town	Cardiff, Wales
15:00 BST			D.Peer	Stadium: Ninian Park; Attendance: 7,872

26 August 1995 3	Northampton Town	3–3	Mansfield Town	Northampton
15:00 BST	J.White; C.Burns (pen.)		M.Sale; I.Baraclough	Stadium: Sixfields Stadium; Attendance: 4,797

29 August 1995 4	Hartlepool United	2–1	Northampton Town	Hartlepool
19:30 BST	D.Henderson; D.Hughes		G.Thompson	Stadium: Victoria Park; Attendance: 2,390

2 September 1995 5	Rochdale	1–2	Northampton Town	Rochdale
15:00 BST	P.Butler		C.Burns; J.White	Stadium: Spotland Stadium; Attendance: 2,193

9 September 1995 6	Northampton Town	0–0	Exeter City	Northampton
15:00 BST				Stadium: Sixfields Stadium; Attendance: 5,625

12 September 1995 7	Northampton Town	1–2	Leyton Orient	Northampton
19:45 BST	G.Williams		I.Hendon; A.Inglethorpe	Stadium: Sixfields Stadium; Attendance: 5,072

16 September 1995 8	Doncaster Rovers	1–0	Northampton Town	Doncaster
15:00 BST	G.Brabin			Stadium: Belle Vue; Attendance: 2,353

23 September 1995 9	Torquay United	3–0	Northampton Town	Torquay
15:00 BST	P.Buckle (pen.); J.Ndah; J.Mateu			Stadium: Plainmoor; Attendance: 2,314

30 September 1995 10	Northampton Town	2–0	Fulham	Northampton
15:00 BST	N.Grayson; J.White			Stadium: Sixfields Stadium; Attendance: 5,778

7 October 1995 11	Scunthorpe United	0–0	Northampton Town	Scunthorpe
15:00 BST				Stadium: Glanford Park; Attendance: 2,455

14 October 1995 12	Northampton Town	3–0	Cambridge United	Northampton
15:00 BST	N.Grayson; C.Burns; L.Colkin			Stadium: Sixfields Stadium; Attendance: 6,301

21 October 1995 13	Colchester United	1–0	Northampton Town	Colchester
15:00 BST	M.Kinsella 60'	Report		Stadium: Layer Road; Attendance: 3,823; Referee: Graham Pooley

28 October 1995 14	Northampton Town	0–2	Barnet	Northampton
15:00 GMT			M.Cooper; J.Campbell	Stadium: Sixfields Stadium; Attendance: 5,476

31 October 1995 15	Northampton Town	1–2	Preston North End	Northampton
19:45 GMT	A.Gibb		A.Saville; R.Wilcox	Stadium: Sixfields Stadium; Attendance: 4,695

6 November 1995 16	Gillingham	0–0	Northampton Town	Gillingham
15:00 GMT				Stadium: Priestfield Stadium; Attendance: 7,207

18 November 1995 17	Northampton Town	0–0	Wigan Athletic	Northampton
15:00 GMT				Stadium: Sixfields Stadium; Attendance: 4,102

25 November 1995 18	Lincoln City	1–0	Northampton Town	Lincoln
15:00 GMT	S.Brown			Stadium: Sincil Bank; Attendance: 3,287

9 December 1995 19	Northampton Town	1–1	Torquay United	Northampton
15:00 GMT	J.White		A.Newhouse	Stadium: Sixfields Stadium; Attendance: 3,656

16 December 1995 20	Fulham	1–3	Northampton Town	Fulham, London
15:00 GMT	T.Angus		G.Thompson; J.White	Stadium: Craven Cottage; Attendance: 3,421

23 December 1995 21	Scarborough	2–1	Northampton Town	Scarborough
15:00 GMT	A.Ritchie; N.Trebble		J.White	Stadium: Athletic Ground; Attendance: 1,404

26 December 1995 22	Northampton Town	1–1	Hereford United	Northampton
15:00 GMT	J.White		D.Smith	Stadium: Sixfields Stadium; Attendance: 6,222

6 January 1996 23	Darlington	1–2	Northampton Town	Darlington
15:00 GMT	G.Worboys		J.White	Stadium: Feethams; Attendance: 1,943

13 January 1996 24	Northampton Town	1–0	Cardiff City	Northampton
15:00 GMT	G.Armstrong			Stadium: Sixfields Stadium; Attendance: 4,454

20 January 1996 25	Bury	0–1	Northampton Town	Bury, Greater Manchester
15:00 GMT			J.White	Stadium: Gigg Lane; Attendance: 3,074

30 January 1996 26	Northampton Town	1–0	Plymouth Argyle	Northampton
15:00 GMT	I.Sampson			Stadium: Sixfields Stadium; Attendance: 3,911

3 February 1996 27	Mansfield Town	0–0	Northampton Town	Mansfield
15:00 GMT				Stadium: Field Mill; Attendance: 2,981

10 February 1996 28	Northampton Town	1–1	Darlington	Northampton
15:00 GMT	J.White		R.Painter	Stadium: Sixfields Stadium; Attendance: 4,926

17 February 1996 29	Leyton Orient	2–0	Northampton Town	Leyton, London
15:00 GMT	A.Arnott; C.West			Stadium: Brisbane Road; Attendance: 4,444

19 February 1996 30	Northampton Town	2–1	Rochdale	Northampton
19:45 GMT	R.Warburton; G.Worboys		I.Thompstone	Stadium: Sixfields Stadium; Attendance: 3,090

24 February 1996 31	Northampton Town	3–3	Doncaster Rovers	Northampton
15:00 GMT	I.Sampson; N.Doherty; J.White (pen.)		C.Cramb; J.Schofield (pen.)	Stadium: Sixfields Stadium; Attendance: 4,738

27 February 1996 32	Exeter City	1–2	Northampton Town	Exeter
19:45 GMT	M.Gavin		R.Warburton; N.Grayson	Stadium: St James Park; Attendance: 2,663

2 March 1996 33	Hereford United	1–0	Northampton Town	Hereford
15:00 GMT	T.James			Stadium: Edgar Street; Attendance: 2,822

9 March 1996 34	Northampton Town	2–0	Scarborough	Northampton
15:00 GMT	J.White; I.Sampson			Stadium: Sixfields Stadium; Attendance: 4,621

16 March 1996 35	Plymouth Argyle	1–0	Northampton Town	Plymouth
15:00 GMT	M.Evans			Stadium: Home Park; Attendance: 7,001

20 March 1996 36	Northampton Town	0–0	Hartlepool United	Northampton
19:45 GMT				Stadium: Sixfields Stadium; Attendance: 3,537
Note: Fixture was previously postponed on 27 January 1996 due to snow and frost.

23 March 1996 37	Northampton Town	1–0	Chester City	Northampton
15:00 GMT	C.Burns			Stadium: Sixfields Stadium; Attendance: 4,810

30 March 1996 38	Northampton Town	1–2	Scunthorpe United	Northampton
15:00 GMT	N.Grayson		P.Clarkson; A.McFarlane	Stadium: Sixfields Stadium; Attendance: 4,290

2 April 1996 39	Cambridge United	0–1	Northampton Town	Cambridge
19:45 BST			J.White	Stadium: Abbey Stadium; Attendance: 3,631

6 April 1996 40	Barnet	2–0	Northampton Town	Barnet
15:00 BST	L.Hodges; L.Primus			Stadium: Underhill; Attendance: 3,315

8 April 1996 41	Northampton Town	2–1	Colchester United	Northampton
15:00 BST	N.Grayson 65'; A.Gibb 81'	Report	R.Reinelt 90'	Stadium: Sixfields Stadium; Attendance: 5,021; Referee: Steve Bennett

13 April 1996 42	Preston North End	0–3	Northampton Town	Preston
15:00 BST			N.Grayson	Stadium: Deepdale; Attendance: 11,774

20 April 1996 43	Northampton Town	1–1	Gillingham	Northampton
15:00 BST	C.Burns		L.Fortune-West	Stadium: Sixfields Stadium; Attendance: 7,427

23 April 1996 44	Chester City	1–0	Northampton Town	Chester
19:45 BST	J.Murphy			Stadium: Deva Stadium; Attendance: 1,674
Note: Fixture was previously postponed on 2 January 1995 due to ice.

27 April 1996 45	Northampton Town	1–1	Lincoln City	Northampton
15:00 BST	R.Warburton		J.Minett (pen.)	Stadium: Sixfields Stadium; Attendance: 5,166

4 May 1996 46	Wigan Athletic	1–2	Northampton Town	Wigan
15:00 BST	M.Leonard		I.Sampson; J.White	Stadium: Springfield Park; Attendance: 2,390

=== FA Cup ===
11 November 1995 First round	Northampton Town	1–0	Hayes	Northampton
15:00 GMT	R.Warburton			Stadium: Sixfields Stadium; Attendance: 5,389

2 December 1995 Second round	Oxford United	2–0	Northampton Town	Oxford
15:00 GMT	S.Massey; P.Moody			Stadium: Manor Ground; Attendance: 6,348

=== League Cup ===
15 August 1995 First round 1st leg	West Bromwich Albion	1–1	Northampton Town	West Bromwich
19:45 BST	B.Taylor		L.Colkin	Stadium: The Hawthorns; Attendance: 6,489

22 August 1995 First round 2nd leg	Northampton Town	2–4	West Bromwich Albion	Northampton
19:45 BST	C.Burns (pen.); D.Peer		K.Donovan; A.Hunt; B.Taylor	Stadium: Sixfields Stadium; Attendance: 7,083

=== League Trophy ===
Group 3
Team	Pld	W	D	L	GF	GA	GD	Pts	Qualification
Peterborough United	2	1	1	0	3	0	+3	4	Qualified for next round
Northampton Town	2	1	1	0	1	0	+1	4	Qualified for next round
Plymouth Argyle	2	0	0	2	0	4	−4	0	

16 October 1995 Group 3 (s)	Peterborough United	0–0	Northampton Town	Peterborough
19:45 GMT				Stadium: London Road; Attendance: 3,045

8 November 1995 Group 3 (s)	Northampton Town	1–0	Plymouth Argyle	Northampton
19:45 GMT	C.Burns			Stadium: Sixfields Stadium; Attendance: 2,109

28 November 1995 Second round (s)	Cardiff City	1–2	Northampton Town	Cardiff, Wales
19:30 GMT			R.Hunter; N.Grayson	Stadium: Ninian Park; Attendance: 1,450

28 November 1995 Quarter-final (s)	Hereford United	1–0	Northampton Town	Hereford
19:45 GMT				Stadium: Edgar Street; Attendance: 2,909

=== Appearances and goals ===
Pos	Player	Division Three			FA Cup			League Cup			League Trophy			Total		
Pos	Player	Starts	Sub	Goals	Starts	Sub	Goals	Starts	Sub	Goals	Starts	Sub	Goals	Starts	Sub	Goals
GK	Billy Turley	2	–	–	–	–	–	–	–	–	–	–	–	2	–	–
GK	Andy Woodman	44	–	–	2	–	–	2	–	–	4	–	–	52	–	–
DF	Lee Colkin	14	10	1	1	1	–	2	–	1	2	–	–	19	11	2
DF	Lee Maddison	21	–	–	2	–	–	–	–	–	2	–	–	25	–	–
DF	Dave Norton	42	2	–	2	–	–	2	–	–	3	–	–	49	2	–
DF	Ian Sampson	30	3	4	–	–	–	2	–	–	2	–	–	34	3	4
DF	Mark Taylor	1	–	–	–	–	–	–	–	–	–	–	–	1	–	–
DF	Ray Warburton	44	–	3	2	–	1	2	–	–	4	–	–	52	–	4
MF	Jason Beckford	–	1	–	–	1	–	–	–	–	–	2	–	–	4	–
MF	Chris Burns	40	3	7	2	–	–	2	–	–	3	–	1	47	3	8
MF	Ollie Cahill	2	1	–	–	1	–	–	–	–	–	–	–	2	2	–
MF	Neil Doherty	3	6	1	–	–	–	–	–	–	–	–	–	3	6	1
MF	Ali Gibb	12	11	2	–	–	–	–	–	–	2	–	–	14	11	2
MF	Roy Hunter	26	8	–	2	–	–	–	–	–	4	–	1	32	8	1
MF	Danny O'Shea	37	1	–	2	–	–	2	–	–	2	1	–	43	2	–
MF	Dean Peer	37	5	1	2	–	–	2	–	1	4	–	–	45	5	2
MF	Michael Warner	–	–	–	–	–	–	–	–	–	–	–	–	–	–	–
MF	Gareth Williams	25	10	1	1	–	–	2	–	–	2	1	–	30	11	1
FW	Neil Grayson	37	5	11	1	–	–	2	–	–	2	–	1	42	5	12
FW	Christian Lee	1	4	–	1	1	–	–	–	–	2	–	–	4	5	–
FW	Garry Thompson	21	13	2	–	–	–	–	2	–	–	1	–	21	16	2
FW	Gavin Worboys	4	9	1	–	–	–	–	–	–	–	–	–	4	9	1
FW	Jason White	40	5	16	2	–	–	–	1	–	3	–	–	45	6	16
Players who left before end of season:
DF	Darren Hughes	7	1	–	–	–	–	–	–	–	1	–	–	8	1	–
DF	Derek Mountfield	4	–	–	–	–	–	–	–	–	–	–	–	4	–	–
DF	Tony Smith	2	–	–	–	–	–	2	–	–	–	–	–	4	–	–
MF	Gordon Armstrong	4	–	1	–	–	–	–	–	–	1	–	–	5	–	1
MF	Rob Scott	5	–	–	–	–	–	–	–	–	1	–	–	6	–	–
FW	Martin Aldridge	–	–	–	–	–	–	–	–	–	–	2	–	–	2	–
FW	Steve Taylor	1	1	–	–	–	–	–	–	–	–	–	–	1	1	–
