= 1994–95 Northampton Town F.C. season =

Northampton Town
1994–95 season
- Chairman: Barry Ward
- Manager: John Barnwell (until 29 December); Peter Morris (caretaker); Ian Atkins (from 10 January)
- Stadium: Sixfields Stadium
- Division Three: 17th
- FA Cup: First round
- League Cup: First round
- League Trophy: Second round
- Top goalscorer: League: Neil Grayson (8); All: Neil Grayson (10)
- Highest home attendance: 7,461 vs Barnet
- Lowest home attendance: 2,466 vs Hartlepool United
- Average home league attendance: 5,085

The 1994–95 season was Northampton Town's 98th season in their history and the fifth successive season in the Third Division. Alongside competing in Division Three, the club also participated in the FA Cup, League Cup and Football League Trophy.

== Players ==
As of match played 6 May 1995.

Name	Position	Nat.	Place of birth	Date of birth	Apps	Goals	Signed from	Date signed	Fee
Goalkeepers
Mark Ovendale	GK	(England)	Leicester	22 November 1973 (aged 21)	8	0	Wisbech Town	August 1994	Free
Andy Woodman	GK	(England)	Camberwell	11 August 1971 (aged 23)	10	0	Exeter City	10 March 1995	Free
Defenders
Lee Colkin	LB	(England)	Nuneaton	15 July 1974 (aged 20)	74	3	Apprentice	31 August 1992	N/A
Robbie Curtis	CB	(England)	Mansfield	21 May 1972 (aged 22)	17	0	Boston United	June 1994	Free
Scott Daniels	CB	(England)	South Benfleet	22 November 1969 (aged 25)	8	0	Exeter City	30 January 1995	Free
Darren Hughes	LB	(England)	Prescot	6 October 1965 (aged 29)	13	0	Port Vale	January 1995	Free
Dave Norton	RB	(England)	Cannock	3 March 1965 (aged 30)	42	0	Hull City	15 August 1994	£25,000
Jason Pascoe	RB	(England)	Jarrow	15 February 1970 (aged 25)	19	0	Clipstone Welfare	June 1994	Free
Ian Sampson	CB	(England)	Wakefield	14 November 1968 (aged 26)	56	2	Sunderland	5 August 1994	£30,000
Richard Skelly	LB	(England)	Norwich	24 March 1972 (aged 23)	5	0	Cambridge United	June 1994	Free
Ray Warburton (c)	CB	(England)	Rotherham	7 October 1967 (aged 27)	62	5	York City	4 February 1994	£35,000
Midfielders
Chris Burns	RM	(England)	Manchester	9 November 1967 (aged 27)	17	2	Swansea City	13 January 1995	Free
Ray Byrne	CM	(Northern Ireland)	Newry	4 July 1972 (aged 22)	3	0	Nottingham Forest	August 1994	Free
Ollie Cahill	LM	(Republic of Ireland)	Clonmel	29 September 1975 (aged 19)	11	1	Clonmel Town	27 September 1994	Free
Darren Harmon	CM	(England)	Northampton	30 January 1973 (aged 22)	106	13	Shrewsbury Town	24 October 1992	Free
Gary Harrison	MF	(England)	Northampton	12 March 1975 (aged 20)	7	0	Apprentice	December 1993	N/A
Danny O'Shea	CM	(England)	Newington	26 March 1963 (aged 32)	7	1	Cambridge United	23 March 1995	Free
Mark Turner	CM	(England)	Bebington	4 October 1972 (aged 22)	4	0	Wolverhampton Wanderers	1 July 1994	Free
Gareth Williams	RM	(England)	Cowes	12 March 1967 (aged 28)	19	0	AFC Bournemouth	27 September 1994	Free
Forwards
Martin Aldridge	FW	(England)	Northampton	6 December 1974 (aged 20)	79	22	Apprentice	27 August 1993	N/A
Ian Brown	FW	(England)	Ipswich	11 September 1965 (aged 29)	23	4	Bristol City	December 1994	Free
Neil Grayson	FW	(England)	York	1 November 1964 (aged 30)	44	10	Boston United	19 June 1994	Free
Garry Thompson	FW	(England)	Kings Heath	7 October 1959 (aged 35)	15	4	Cardiff City	10 February 1995	Free
Dean Trott	FW	(England)	Barnsley	13 May 1967 (aged 27)	26	4	Boston United	1 August 1994	Free

== Competitions ==
=== Division Three ===
==== League table ====
Pos	Team	Pld	W	D	L	GF	GA	GD	Pts
15	Rochdale	42	12	14	16	44	67	−23	50
16	Hereford United	42	12	13	17	45	62	−17	49
17	Northampton Town	42	10	14	18	45	67	−22	44
18	Hartlepool United	42	11	10	21	43	69	−26	43
19	Gillingham	42	10	11	21	46	64	−18	41

==== Results summary ====
Overall								Home						Away					
Pld	W	D	L	GF	GA	GD	Pts	W	D	L	GF	GA	GD	W	D	L	GF	GA	GD
42	10	14	18	45	67	−22	44	8	5	8	25	29	−4	2	9	10	20	38	−18

Last updated: 26 April 2020.

==== League position by match ====
Round	1	2	3	4	5	6	7	8	9	10	11	12	13	14	15	16	17	18	19	20	21	22	23	24	25	26	27	28	29	30	31	32	33	34	35	36	37	38	39	40	41	42
Ground	A	A	A	A	H	H	A	H	A	A	H	H	H	A	H	A	H	H	H	A	H	A	A	H	H	A	H	A	A	H	A	H	A	H	H	A	H	A	H	A	A	H
Result	L	D	L	D	L	D	D	W	D	D	L	D	W	D	L	L	L	D	L	W	L	L	L	W	L	L	W	D	L	W	L	L	D	W	D	D	W	L	D	L	W	W
Position	17	17	19	21	22	21	21	20	19	20	20	21	17	16	18	18	20	21	21	20	21	21	21	20	20	21	20	18	20	19	19	19	19	18	18	18	18	19	18	20	19	17

Source: 11v11.com
A = Away; H = Home; W = Win; D = Draw; L = Loss

==== Matches ====
Win Draw Loss

20 August 1994 1	Doncaster Rovers	1–0	Northampton Town	Doncaster
15:00 BST	G.Jones			Stadium: Belle Vue (Doncaster); Attendance: 2,154

27 August 1994 2	Scunthorpe United	1–1	Northampton Town	Scunthorpe
15:00 BST	R.Bradley		D.Trott	Stadium: Glanford Park; Attendance: 2,499

30 August 1994 3	Torquay United	2–1	Northampton Town	Torquay
19:30 BST	C.Okorie		I.Sampson	Stadium: Plainmoor; Attendance: 3,619

3 September 1994 4	Walsall	1–1	Northampton Town	Walsall
15:00 BST	K.Lightbourne		D.Trott	Stadium: Bescot Stadium; Attendance: 4,249

10 September 1994 5	Northampton Town	1–2	Rochdale	Northampton
15:00 BST	D.Trott 38'		S.Reid 62'; D.Thompson 66'	Stadium: County Ground; Attendance: 2,887

13 September 1994 6	Northampton Town	1–1	Hartlepool United	Northampton
19:30 BST	M.Aldridge		S.Halliday	Stadium: County Ground; Attendance: 2,446

17 September 1994 7	Mansfield Town	1–1	Northampton Town	Mansfield
15:00 BST	P.Holland		M.Aldridge	Stadium: Field Mill; Attendance: 2,557

24 September 1994 8	Northampton Town	2–1	Carlisle United	Northampton
15:00 BST	M.Aldridge; M.Bell		D.Reeves	Stadium: County Ground; Attendance: 3,508

1 October 1994 9	Lincoln City	2–2	Northampton Town	Lincoln
15:00 BST	G.Brown; D.Puttnam		D.Harmon; R.Warburton	Stadium: Sincil Bank; Attendance: 3,248

8 October 1994 10	Exeter	0–0	Northampton Town	Exeter
15:00 BST				Stadium: St James Park; Attendance: 3,015

11 October 1994 11	Northampton Town	0–1	Mansfield Town	Northampton
19:30 BST			S.Wilkinson	Stadium: County Ground; Attendance: 4,993

15 October 1994 12	Northampton Town	1–1	Barnet	Northampton
15:00 BST	M.Aldridge		D.Freedman	Stadium: Sixfields Stadium; Attendance: 7,461

22 October 1994 13	Northampton Town	1–0	Wigan Athletic	Northampton
15:00 BST	N.Grayson			Stadium: Sixfields Stadium; Attendance: 6,379

29 October 1994 14	Scarborough	0–0	Northampton Town	Scarborough
15:00 GMT				Stadium: Athletic Ground; Attendance: 1,468

5 November 1994 15	Northampton Town	0–1	Fulham	Northampton
15:00 GMT			M.Adams	Stadium: Sixfields Stadium; Attendance: 7,366

19 November 1994 16	Preston North End	2–0	Northampton Town	Preston
15:00 GMT	P.Raynor; D.Moyes			Stadium: Deepdale; Attendance: 7,043

26 November 1994 17	Northampton Town	1–3	Hereford United	Northampton
15:00 GMT	O.Cahill		G.Pick; A.Reece pen.' S.White	Stadium: Sixfields Stadium; Attendance: 5,148

10 December 1994 18	Northampton Town	0–0	Doncaster Rovers	Northampton
15:00 GMT				Stadium: Sixfields Stadium; Attendance: 4,463

16 December 1994 19	Northampton Town	0–1	Scunthorpe United	Northampton
19:30 GMT			A.Knill	Stadium: Sixfields Stadium; Attendance: 3,841

26 December 1994 20	Colchester United	0–1	Northampton Town	Colchester
12:00 GMT		Report	D.Harmon 35' (pen.)	Stadium: Layer Road; Attendance: 5,064; Referee: Paul Alcock

27 December 1994 21	Northampton Town	2–3	Chesterfield	Northampton
15:00 GMT	I.Brown; D.Harmon pen.'		D.Moss; L.Madden	Stadium: Sixfields Stadium; Attendance: 6,329

31 December 1994 22	Darlington	4–1	Northampton Town	Darlington
15:00 GMT	I.Banks; S.Gaughan; S.Shaw; B.Slaven		N.Grayson	Stadium: Feethams; Attendance: 2,247

7 January 1995 23	Wigan Athletic	2–1	Northampton Town	Wigan
15:00 GMT	I.Kilford; N.Rimmer		L.Colkin	Stadium: Springfield Park; Attendance: 1,911

14 January 1995 24	Northampton Town	2–0	Gillingham	Northampton
15:00 GMT	D.Harmon pen.' D.Trott			Stadium: Sixfields Stadium; Attendance: 5,529

28 January 1995 25	Northampton Town	0–3	Scarborough	Northampton
15:00 GMT			G.Swann; D.D'Auria; S.Norris	Stadium: Sixfields Stadium; Attendance: 5,737

4 February 1995 26	Hereford United	2–1	Northampton Town	Hereford
15:00 GMT	K.Lloyd; S.White		N.Grayson	Stadium: Edgar Street; Attendance: 2,443

11 February 1995 27	Northampton Town	2–1	Preston North End	Northampton
15:00 GMT	C.Burns; N.Smith		A.Smart	Stadium: Sixfields Stadium; Attendance: 5,197

14 February 1995 28	Fulham	4–4	Northampton Town	Fulham, London
19:45 GMT	R.Hamill; S.Morgan; M.Adams pen.'		M.Aldridge; I.Brown; N.Grayson	Stadium: Craven Cottage; Attendance: 3,423
Note: Fixture was previously postponed on January 21, 1995 due to a waterlogged pitch.

18 February 1995 29	Gillingham	3–1	Northampton Town	Gillingham
15:00 GMT	A.Ramage; R.Green; A.Foster		G.Thompson	Stadium: Priestfield; Attendance: 4,072

25 February 1995 30	Northampton Town	3–1	Lincoln City	Northampton
15:00 GMT	G.Brown o.g.' N.Grayson; M.Aldridge		C.Greenall	Stadium: Sixfields Stadium; Attendance: 4,821

4 March 1995 31	Carlisle United	2–1	Northampton Town	Carlisle
15:00 GMT	D.Walling		D.Martin	Stadium: Brunton Park; Attendance: 6,744

7 March 1995 32	Northampton Town	0–5	Bury	Northampton
19:45 GMT			T.Kelly; D.Pugh; P.Stant	Stadium: Sixfields Stadium; Attendance: 4,208
Note: Fixture was previously postponed on January 1, 1996.

11 March 1995 33	Rochdale	0–0	Northampton Town	Rochdale
15:00 GMT				Stadium: Spotland; Attendance: 1,894

18 March 1995 34	Northampton Town	2–0	Torquay United	Northampton
15:00 GMT	N.Grayson; I.Brown			Stadium: Sixfields Stadium; Attendance: 3,957

25 March 1995 35	Northampton Town	2–2	Walsall	Northampton
15:00 GMT	N.Grayson; R.Warburton		K.Lightbourne; K.Wilson	Stadium: Sixfields Stadium; Attendance: 6,282

1 April 1995 36	Hartlepool United	1–1	Northampton Town	Hartlepool
15:00 BST	K.Houchen		G.Thompson	Stadium: Victoria Park; Attendance: 2,113

8 April 1995 37	Northampton Town	2–1	Darlington	Northampton
15:00 BST	G.Thompson; N.Grayson		R.Painter	Stadium: Sixfields Stadium; Attendance: 4,496

15 April 1995 38	Chesterfield	3–0	Northampton Town	Chesterfield
15:00 BST	A.Morris; P.Robinson			Stadium: Saltergate; Attendance: 4,884

17 April 1995 39	Northampton Town	1–1	Colchester United	Northampton
15:00 BST	I.Brown 8'	Report	S.Whitton 66'	Stadium: Sixfields Stadium; Attendance: 5,011; Referee: Uriah Rennie

22 April 1995 40	Bury	5–0	Northampton Town	Bury
15:00 BST	D.Pugh; J.Paskin; T.Rigby; N.Daws			Stadium: Gigg Lane; Attendance: 2,921

29 April 1995 41	Barnet	2–3	Northampton Town	Chipping Barnet
15:00 BST	D.Freedman; A.Inglethorpe		C.Burns; G.Thompson; R.Warburton	Stadium: Underhill; Attendance: 2,796

6 May 1995 42	Northampton Town	2–1	Exeter City	Northampton
15:00 BST	D.O'Shea; I.Sampson		J.Minett pen.'	Stadium: Sixfields Stadium; Attendance: 6,734

=== FA Cup ===
12 November 1994 First round	Peterborough	4–0	Northampton Town	Peterborough
15:00 GMT	L.Williams; L.Henry; K.Charlery			Stadium: London Road; Attendance: 8,739

=== League Cup ===
16 August 1994 First round 1st leg	AFC Bournemouth	2–0	Northampton Town	Bournemouth
19:45 BST	S.Cotterill; K.Russell			Stadium: Dean Court; Attendance: 2,587

6 September 1994 First round 2nd leg	Northampton Town	0–1	AFC Bournemouth	Northampton
19:30 BST			S.Cotterill	Stadium: County Ground; Attendance: 3,249

=== League Trophy ===
Group 7
Team	Pld	W	D	L	GF	GA	GD	Pts	Qualification
Northampton Town	2	2	0	0	6	2	+4	6	Qualified for next round
Cambridge United	2	1	0	1	3	3	0	3	Qualified for next round
Barnet	2	0	0	2	1	5	−4	0	

18 October 1994 Group 7 (s)	Cambridge United	1–3	Northampton Town	Cambridge
19:45 BST			R.Warburton; N.Grayson; M.Aldridge	Stadium: Abbey Stadium; Attendance: 1,497

1 November 1994 Group 7 (s)	Northampton Town	3–1	Barnet	Northampton
19:30 GMT	D.Harmon; N.Grayson; M.Aldridge			Stadium: Sixfields Stadium; Attendance: 2,618

29 November 1994 Second round (s)	Northampton Town	0–1	Swansea City	Northampton
19:30 GMT				Stadium: Sixfields Stadium; Attendance: 2,706

=== Appearances and goals ===
Pos	Player	Division Three			FA Cup			League Cup			League Trophy			Total		
Pos	Player	Starts	Sub	Goals	Starts	Sub	Goals	Starts	Sub	Goals	Starts	Sub	Goals	Starts	Sub	Goals
GK	Mark Ovendale	6	–	–	–	–	–	–	–	–	2	–	–	8	–	–
GK	Andy Woodman	10	–	–	–	–	–	–	–	–	–	–	–	10	–	–
DF	Lee Colkin	28	5	1	1	–	–	1	–	–	1	–	–	31	5	1
DF	Robbie Curtis	13	–	–	–	–	–	2	–	–	1	1	–	16	1	–
DF	Scott Daniels	5	3	–	–	–	–	–	–	–	–	–	–	5	3	–
DF	Darren Hughes	12	1	–	–	–	–	–	–	–	–	–	–	12	1	–
DF	Dave Norton	36	2	–	1	–	–	2	–	–	1	–	–	40	2	–
DF	Jason Pascoe	11	4	–	1	–	–	1	–	–	2	–	–	15	4	–
DF	Ian Sampson	42	–	2	1	–	–	2	–	–	3	–	–	48	–	2
DF	Richard Skelly	3	–	–	–	–	–	–	–	–	2	–	–	5	–	–
DF	Ray Warburton	39	–	3	1	–	–	2	–	–	3	–	1	45	–	4
MF	Chris Burns	16	1	2	–	–	–	–	–	–	–	–	–	16	1	2
MF	Ray Byrne	2	–	–	–	–	–	1	–	–	–	–	–	3	–	–
MF	Ollie Cahill	5	3	1	–	–	–	–	–	–	1	2	–	6	5	1
MF	Darren Harmon	26	7	4	1	–	–	2	–	–	3	–	1	32	7	5
MF	Gary Harrison	5	–	–	–	–	–	–	–	–	–	1	–	5	1	–
MF	Danny O'Shea	7	–	1	–	–	–	–	–	–	–	–	–	7	–	1
MF	Mark Turner	2	2	–	–	–	–	–	–	–	1	–	–	3	2	–
MF	Gareth Williams	13	2	–	1	–	–	–	–	–	3	–	–	17	2	–
FW	Martin Aldridge	18	9	7	–	1	–	1	–	–	2	–	2	21	10	9
FW	Ian Brown	23	–	4	–	–	–	–	–	–	–	–	–	23	–	4
FW	Neil Grayson	34	4	8	1	–	–	2	–	–	3	–	2	40	4	10
FW	Garry Thompson	15	–	4	–	–	–	–	–	–	–	–	–	15	–	4
FW	Dean Trott	20	2	4	1	–	–	2	–	–	1	–	–	24	2	4
Players who left before end of season:
GK	Billy Stewart	26	1	–	1	–	–	2	–	–	1	–	–	30	1	–
DF	Ben Sedgemore	1	–	–	–	–	–	–	–	–	–	–	–	1	–	–
MF	Micky Bell	12	–	1	–	–	–	1	1	–	–	–	–	13	1	1
MF	Dave Martin	7	–	1	–	–	–	–	–	–	–	–	–	7	–	1
MF	Phil Robinson	14	–	–	1	–	–	1	–	–	2	–	–	18	–	–
MF	Nicky Smith	6	–	1	–	–	–	–	–	–	–	–	–	6	–	1
FW	Andy Flounders	2	–	–	–	–	–	–	–	–	–	–	–	2	–	–
FW	Brett McNamara	–	1	–	–	–	–	–	–	–	1	–	–	1	1	–
FW	Warren Patmore	1	3	–	–	–	–	–	–	–	–	–	–	1	3	–
