= 1996–97 Oxford United F.C. season =

English football club season

Oxford United
1996–97 season
- Chairman: Robin Herd
- Manager: Denis Smith
- Stadium: Manor Ground
- Football League First Division: 17th
- FA Cup: Third round
- League Cup: Fourth round
- Top goalscorer: League: Jemson (18); All: Jemson (23)
- Highest home attendance: 9,223 vs. Reading (28 December 1996)
- Lowest home attendance: 6,334 vs. Bradford City (14 September 1996)
- Average home league attendance: 7,656

During the 1996–97 English football season, Oxford United F.C. competed in the Football League First Division.

== Season summary ==
The 1996–97 season saw Oxford looking hopeful of gaining promotion to the Premier League, but the squad lacked the strength to make their form consistent and they finished seventeenth, following the sale of star defender Matt Elliott to Leicester City.

== Final league table ==
Pos	Team	Pld	W	D	L	GF	GA	GD	Pts
15	Charlton Athletic	46	16	11	19	52	66	−14	59
16	West Bromwich Albion	46	14	15	17	68	72	−4	57
17	Oxford United	46	16	9	21	64	68	−4	57
18	Reading	46	15	12	19	58	67	−9	57
19	Swindon Town	46	15	9	22	52	71	−19	54

Rules for classification: 1) Points; 2) Goals scored; 3) Goal difference

== Results ==
Oxford United's score comes first

=== Legend ===
Win	Draw	Loss

=== Football League First Division ===
Date	Opponent	Venue	Result	Attendance	Scorers
17 August 1996	Queens Park Rangers	A	1–2	14,703	Jemson
24 August 1996	Southend United	H	5–0	6,382	Beauchamp (2), Jemson (2), Rush
27 August 1996	Norwich City	H	0–1	7,436	
31 August 1996	Port Vale	A	0–2	6,016	
8 September 1996	Reading	A	0–2	8,099	
10 September 1996	Wolverhampton Wanderers	H	1–1	7,468	M Ford
14 September 1996	Bradford City	H	2–0	6,334	Jemson, Moody
21 September 1996	Grimsby Town	A	2–0	4,120	Jemson (pen), Handyside (own goal)
28 September 1996	Portsmouth	H	2–0	7,626	Beauchamp, M Ford
1 October 1996	Tranmere Rovers	A	0–0	4,577	
12 October 1996	Swindon Town	A	0–1	10,811	
15 October 1996	Barnsley	A	0–0	6,337	
18 October 1996	Birmingham City	H	0–0	7,594	
26 October 1996	Charlton Athletic	A	0–2	10,626	
29 October 1996	Stoke City	H	4–1	6,381	Gray, Angel, Jemson, Aldridge
2 November 1996	Ipswich Town	H	3–1	7,903	Mowbray (own goal), Jemson, Elliott
13 November 1996	Manchester City	A	3–2	23,079	Beauchamp, Jemson, Elliott
16 November 1996	Huddersfield Town	H	1–0	7,460	Elliott
19 November 1996	Bolton Wanderers	H	0–0	7,517	
23 November 1996	Oldham Athletic	A	1–2	4,851	Jemson
30 November 1996	Charlton Athletic	H	0–2	7,080	
7 December 1996	Crystal Palace	A	2–2	17,879	Jemson, Massey
14 December 1996	Sheffield United	H	4–1	7,737	Aldridge (3), Jemson
21 December 1996	West Bromwich Albion	A	3–3	13,782	Jemson, Murphy, Elliott
26 December 1996	Wolverhampton Wanderers	A	1–3	26,511	Gray
28 December 1996	Reading	H	2–1	9,223	Beauchamp, Murphy
11 January 1997	Bradford City	A	0–2	13,275	
18 January 1997	Tranmere Rovers	H	2–1	7,072	Aldridge, Jemson (pen)
28 January 1997	Portsmouth	A	1–2	7,301	Angel
2 February 1997	Manchester City	H	1–4	8,824	Moody
7 February 1997	Stoke City	A	1–2	8,609	Moody
15 February 1997	Oldham Athletic	H	3–1	6,868	Graham, Purse, Jemson
22 February 1997	Ipswich Town	A	1–2	11,483	Gabbiadini
1 March 1997	Crystal Palace	H	1–4	8,572	Marsh
4 March 1997	Huddersfield Town	A	0–1	11,276	
8 March 1997	West Bromwich Albion	H	1–0	8,502	Murphy
15 March 1997	Sheffield United	A	1–3	16,226	Gilchrist
18 March 1997	Grimsby Town	H	3–2	6,421	M Ford, Gilchrist, Aldridge
22 March 1997	Southend United	A	2–2	4,102	Jemson, Aldridge
29 March 1997	Queens Park Rangers	H	2–3	8,365	Jemson (pen), Moody
31 March 1997	Norwich City	A	1–1	14,644	Massey
5 April 1997	Port Vale	H	0–2	7,370	
12 April 1997	Bolton Wanderers	A	0–4	15,994	
19 April 1997	Swindon Town	H	2–0	8,167	Aldridge, Massey
26 April 1997	Birmingham City	A	0–2	16,109	
4 May 1997	Barnsley	H	5–1	8,693	Beauchamp (2), Jemson (2, 1 pen), M Ford

=== FA Cup ===
Round	Date	Opponent	Venue	Result	Attendance	Goalscorers
R3	21 January 1997	Watford	A	0–2	9,502	

=== League Cup ===
Round	Date	Opponent	Venue	Result	Attendance	Goalscorers
R1 First Leg	20 August 1996	Norwich City	H	1–1	6,062	Jemson
R1 Second Leg	4 September 1996	Norwich City	A	3–2 (won 4–3 on agg)	7,301	Elliott, M Ford, Aldridge
R2 First Leg	18 September 1996	Sheffield Wednesday	A	1–1	7,499	Moody
R2 Second Leg	24 September 1996	Sheffield Wednesday	H	1–0	6,863	Jemson
R3	22 October 1996	Port Vale	A	0–0	4,942	
R3R	5 November 1996	Port Vale	H	2–0 (won 2–0 on agg)	5,279	Jemson (2)
R4	26 November 1996	Southampton	H	1–1	9,473	Moody
R4R	18 December 1996	Southampton	A	2–3	10,737	Jemson, B Ford

== Squad ==
Note: Flags indicate national team as defined under FIFA eligibility rules; some limited exceptions apply. Players may hold more than one non-FIFA nationality.

No.	Pos.	Nation	Player
-	GK	(England) ENG	Phil Whitehead
-	DF	(England) ENG	Mike Ford
-	DF	(England) ENG	Phil Gilchrist
-	DF	(England) ENG	Darren Purse
-	DF	(England) ENG	Les Robinson
-	MF	(England) ENG	David Smith
-	FW	(England) ENG	Nigel Jemson
-	MF	(England) ENG	Joey Beauchamp
-	FW	(England) ENG	Paul Moody
-	MF	(England) ENG	Martin Gray
-	MF	(England) ENG	Stuart Massey
-	GK	(England) ENG	Elliott Jackson
-	FW	(England) ENG	Matt Murphy

No.	Pos.	Nation	Player
-	MF	(England) ENG	Bobby Ford
-	FW	(England) ENG	Martin Aldridge
-	DF	(England) ENG	Matt Elliott
-	FW	(England) ENG	Mark Angel
-	DF	(England) ENG	Chris Whyte
-	FW	(England) ENG	David Rush
-	DF	(England) ENG	Simon Marsh
-	FW	(England) ENG	Marco Gabbiadini (on loan from Derby County)
-	DF	(England) ENG	Brian Wilsterman
-	MF	(England) ENG	Marcus Phillips
-	MF	(England) ENG	Simon Weatherstone
-	MF	(England) ENG	Paul Powell
