= Martin Aldridge (footballer) =

English footballer (1974–2000)

Personal information
- Full name: Martin James Aldridge
- Date of birth: 6 December 1974
- Place of birth: Northampton, England
- Date of death: 30 January 2000 (aged 25)
- Place of death: Oxford, England
- Height: 5 ft 11 in (1.80 m)
- Position: Forward

Youth career
- 198?–1990: Coventry City
- 1990–1991: Braunston Rangers
- 1991–1993: Northampton Town

Senior career*
Years	Team	Apps	(Gls)
1993–1995	Northampton Town	69	(17)
1995	→ Dagenham & Redbridge (loan)	3	(1)
1995–1998	Oxford United	72	(19)
1998	→ Southend United (loan)	11	(1)
1998–2000	Blackpool	27	(7)
1999	→ Port Vale (loan)	3	(0)
2000	→ Rushden & Diamonds (loan)	1	(0)
Total		186	(45)
- * Club domestic league appearances and goals

Martin James Aldridge (6 December 1974 – 30 January 2000) was an English footballer. A forward, he scored 44 goals in 182 league appearances in a seven-year career in the Football League.

He turned professional at Northampton Town in August 1993. He was loaned out to Dagenham & Redbridge in December 1995 and was transferred to Oxford United later in the month. He helped the club to win promotion out of the Second Division in 1995–96. He later fell out of favour and was loaned out to Southend United in February 1998. He switched to Blackpool in August 1998, where he enjoyed loan spells out to Port Vale and Rushden & Diamonds. After a game at Nene Park, he was involved in a car crash on the A45 and died of his injuries, aged 25.

== Career ==
=== Northampton Town ===
Northampton-born Aldridge joined Coventry City as a schoolboy but was released in 1990. As a 16-year-old, he then played for Ford Sports Daventry (UCL first division), and joined Sunday League side Braunston Rangers on to play with his brother Pete. He began his professional career as a trainee with his local side, Northampton Town, joining them from Braunston, leaving school in the summer of 1991, and turning professional in August 1993. The "Cobblers" finished bottom of the Football League in 1993–94. On 15 October 1994, he scored the first-ever competitive goal at Northampton's new Sixfields Stadium in a 1–1 draw with Barnet. Northampton rose to 17th in the Third Division in 1994–95 under Ian Atkins's stewardship. He moved to Dagenham & Redbridge on loan in December 1995. Later that month, he moved to Oxford United on a free transfer, where he was intended to replace Wayne Biggins.

=== Oxford United ===
Oxford won promotion as runners-up of the Second Division in 1995–96, with Aldridge scoring nine goals in 18 Division Two games before missing the final few games of the season with injury. He scored nine goals in 38 appearances in 1996–97, including a hat-trick in a 4–1 win over Sheffield United at the Manor Ground on 14 December. Aldridge, along with the goals of fellow strikers Nigel Jemson and Paul Moody, helped the "U's" to retain their Division One status with a 17th-place finish. However, they had been in the playoff places earlier in the season before a dismal second half of the campaign put paid to any chances of a place in the FA Premier League. He scored four goals in 29 games in 1997–98, but lost his first-team place after manager Denis Smith was replaced by Malcolm Shotton in December 1997. In February 1998, Aldridge joined Southend United on loan, playing eleven times for Alvin Martin's struggling Division Two side, before returning to Oxford, who released him at the end of the season.

=== Blackpool ===
In August 1998, he joined Second Division Blackpool and was the club's top scorer in 1998–99 with ten goals. However, he then fell out with manager Nigel Worthington, and in September 1999, he joined Port Vale on loan and made three goalless appearances for Brian Horton's First Division "Valiants" in 1999–2000. In January 2000, he joined Conference club Rushden & Diamonds, also on loan, and scored sixty seconds into his debut in an FA Trophy victory at Bath City.

== Death ==
On 30 January 2000, at the age of 25, Aldridge died as a result of injuries sustained in a car crash after leaving Rushden's 6–0 Conference win against Northwich Victoria at Nene Park, for which he had been an unused substitute. He was travelling home towards Northampton on the westbound A45 after the game when his car collided with one travelling in the opposite direction. After being cut free from his car, he was taken to Northampton General Hospital with serious injuries. He was later transferred to Radcliffe Infirmary in Oxford, where he died early the following morning. An inquest found that Aldridge had hit traffic cones and lost control of his car; four contractors were charged with failing to comply with highways regulations after it was concluded that roadwork signs had not been properly lit.

== Career statistics ==
Appearances and goals by club, season and competition
Club	Season	League			FA Cup		Other		Total	
Club	Season	Division	Apps	Goals	Apps	Goals	Apps	Goals	Apps	Goals
Northampton Town	1991–92	Fourth Division	5	0	0	0	0	0	5	0
Northampton Town	1992–93	Third Division	9	2	0	0	1	0	10	2
Northampton Town	1993–94	Third Division	28	8	1	1	4	2	33	11
Northampton Town	1994–95	Third Division	27	7	1	0	3	2	31	9
Northampton Town	1995–96	Third Division	0	0	0	0	2	0	2	0
Northampton Town	Total		69	17	2	1	10	4	81	22
Dagenham & Redbridge	1995–96	Conference	3	1	0	0	0	0	3	1
Oxford United	1995–96	Second Division	18	9	3	0	0	0	21	9
Oxford United	1996–97	First Division	30	8	1	0	7	1	38	9
Oxford United	1997–98	First Division	24	2	0	0	5	2	29	4
Oxford United	Total		72	19	4	0	12	3	88	22
Southend United (loan)	1997–98	Second Division	11	1	0	0	0	0	11	1
Blackpool	1998–99	Second Division	22	7	1	1	2	2	25	10
Blackpool	1999–2000	Second Division	5	0	0	0	1	0	6	0
Blackpool	Total		27	7	1	1	3	2	31	10
Port Vale (loan)	1999–2000	First Division	3	0	0	0	0	0	3	0
Rushden & Diamonds (loan)	1999–2000	Conference National	1	0	0	0	2	1	3	1
Career total			186	45	7	2	27	10	220	57

== Honours ==
Oxford United

- Football League Second Division second-place promotion: 1995–96
