= Danny O'Shea =

Danny O'Shea may refer to:

- Danny O'Shea (ice hockey) (born 1945), retired Canadian ice hockey centre
- Danny O'Shea (footballer) (born 1963), English former footballer
- Danny O'Shea (actor) (born 1900), actor born in Boston, Massachusetts

== See also ==
- Daniel O'Shea (born 1991), American pair skater
- O'Shea (surname)
