= 1998–99 Blackpool F.C. season =

English football club season

Blackpool F.C.
1998–99 season
- Owner: Owen Oyston
- Chairman: Vicki Oyston (until 7 December); Owen Oyston (from 7 December)
- Manager: Nigel Worthington
- Division Two: 14th
- FA Cup: First round
- League Cup: Second round
- Top goalscorer: League: Phil Clarkson (9); All: Martin Aldridge (10)

The 1998–99 season was Blackpool F.C.'s 91st season (88th consecutive) in the Football League. They competed in the 24-team Division Two, then the third tier of English league football, finishing fourteenth.

Martin Aldridge was the club's top scorer, with ten goals (seven in the league, one in the FA Cup and two in the League Cup).

== Table ==
| Pos | Team | Pld | W | D | L | GF | GA | GD | Pts |
|---|---|---|---|---|---|---|---|---|---|
| 12 | Luton Town | 46 | 16 | 10 | 20 | 51 | 60 | −9 | 58 |
| 13 | Bristol Rovers | 46 | 13 | 17 | 16 | 65 | 56 | +9 | 56 |
| 14 | Blackpool | 46 | 14 | 14 | 18 | 44 | 54 | −10 | 56 |
| 15 | Burnley | 46 | 13 | 16 | 17 | 54 | 73 | −19 | 55 |
| 16 | Notts County | 46 | 14 | 12 | 20 | 52 | 61 | −9 | 54 |

Rules for classification: 1) Points; 2) Goals scored; 3) Goal difference
