= Efon Elad =

English footballer

Personal information
- Full name: Diodene Efon Elad
- Date of birth: 5 September 1970 (age 56)
- Place of birth: Hillingdon, England
- Position: Midfielder

Senior career*
Years	Team	Apps	(Gls)
1992–1993	Fortuna Köln		
1993–1994	Northampton Town	10	(0)
1994	Cambridge United	3	(0)
1995	Mansfield Town	2	(0)
1997	Stevenage Borough		
1999	Hitchin Town		
1999	Leighton Town		
2000	Basingstoke Town		
Total		15	(0)
- * Club domestic league appearances and goals

Diodene Efon Elad (born 5 September 1970) is an English former professional footballer who played in the Football League for Cambridge United, Mansfield Town and Northampton Town.
