= Gavin Worboys =

English footballer

Personal information
- Full name: Gavin Anthony Worboys
- Date of birth: 14 July 1974
- Place of birth: Doncaster, England
- Height: 6 ft 0 in (1.83 m)
- Position: Forward

Youth career
- –: Doncaster Rovers

Senior career*
Years	Team	Apps	(Gls)
1991–1992	Doncaster Rovers	7	(2)
1992–1994	Notts County	0	(0)
1993–1994	→ Exeter City (loan)	4	(1)
1994–1996	Darlington	41	(8)
1996	Northampton Town	13	(1)
1996–1997	Gainsborough Trinity		
–	Bradford Park Avenue		
–	Hatfield Main		
–	Armthorpe Welfare		
199?–2001	Eastwood Town		
2001–20??	Hucknall Town		
- * Club domestic league appearances and goals

Gavin Anthony Worboys (born 14 July 1974) is an English former footballer who scored 12 goals from 65 appearances in the Football League playing as a forward for Doncaster Rovers, Exeter City, Darlington and Northampton Town. He was on the books of Notts County, without playing for them in the League, and went on to play non-league football for clubs including Bradford Park Avenue, Hatfield Main, Armthorpe Welfare, Eastwood Town and Hucknall Town.

== Career ==
=== Professional ===
Worboys was born in Doncaster, and began his football career with Doncaster Rovers. He made his debut on 8 February 1992 in a 2–1 home defeat to Cardiff City in the Fourth Division, and after seven appearances and two goals – in a 3–2 win against Scunthorpe United and a 2–0 victory over Rochdale – the 17-year-old Worboys signed for Notts County, about to be relegated from the First Division, for a fee of £100,000. He never played first-team football for Notts County. He spent time on loan at Division Two club Exeter City before dropping down a division to sign for Darlington in late 1994. He appeared more regularly for Darlington, with 8 league goals from 41 matches over 14 months with the club, although towards the end of that time his appearances were more often from the substitutes' bench. Against Cardiff City in September 1995, he took over in goal after Mike Pollitt was sent off and Darlington had no goalkeeper on the bench; he could not stop the resulting penalty, but that was the only goal he did concede. His Football League career ended at Northampton Town, with whom he spent the last few months of the 1995–96 season, taking his totals to 12 goals from 65 matches. He was still only 21.

=== Non-league ===
He continued playing in non-league football with clubs including Gainsborough Trinity, Bradford Park Avenue, Hatfield Main, Armthorpe Welfare and Eastwood Town. In the 1997–98 season, he and strike partner Glenn Kirkwood produced 35 goals between them in the Northern Premier League First Division. In 1999–2000, he helped the club reach the first round proper of the FA Cup for the first time in their history, in which they faced his former club Exeter City, and scored 24 goals over the season. He also found himself in goal again, in September 1999, this time replacing an injured goalkeeper at half-time with his team 1–0 down to Accrington Stanley. He let in just one goal, from a free kick awarded when he handled the ball outside the penalty area, and his teammates scored twice to secure a draw. He joined South Yorkshire Police during the 2000 close season, and although his job did not prevent his continuing to play for Eastwood, it did impact on his availability. In August 2001, he signed for Hucknall Town.
