= Ian Gilzean =

Scottish footballer

Personal information
- Full name: Ian Roger Gilzean
- Date of birth: 10 December 1969 (age 56)
- Place of birth: Enfield, England
- Position: Striker

Youth career
- Tottenham Hotspur

Senior career*
Years	Team	Apps	(Gls)
1992–1993	Dundee	24	(5)
1993	→ Doncaster Rovers (loan)	3	(0)
1993–1994	Northampton Town	33	(10)
1994–1995	Ayr United	23	(3)
1995–1997	Sligo Rovers	41	(15)
1997	Drogheda United	4	(0)
1997–1999	St Patrick's Athletic	60	(27)
1999–2000	Glentoran	30	(8)
2000–2001	Shelbourne	1	(0)
2000–2001	Sligo Rovers	?	(9)
2001–2002	Elgin City	34	(12)
2002–2003	Montrose	14	(0)
- * Club domestic league appearances and goals

Ian Roger Gilzean (born 10 December 1969) is a Scottish former professional footballer who played as a striker. Active in England, Scotland, and Ireland, Gilzean made over 250 career appearances, scoring nearly 100 goals. He is the son of Scottish international player Alan Gilzean.

== Career ==
Born in Enfield, England, Gilzean began his career with the youth team of English team Tottenham Hotspur, before making his professional debut with Scottish team Dundee. Later on in his career, Gilzean played in England for Doncaster Rovers and Northampton Town, in Scotland for Ayr United, Elgin City and Montrose, and in Ireland for Sligo Rovers, Drogheda United, St Patrick's Athletic and in Northern Ireland for Glentoran.

Gilzean signed for Sligo Rovers on a three-year deal in July 1995 and scored on his League of Ireland debut on the opening day of the 1995–96 League of Ireland season. In September 1997 he joined Drogheda United but after only 4 appearances he moved to St Patrick's Athletic, where he scored a hat trick on his debut at Sligo Rovers.

He played twice against Celtic in the 1998–99 UEFA Champions League qualifying round. Days after the disappointment of losing to Celtic, St Pats were involved in a four-team tournament at Lansdowne Road. The Carlsberg Trophy pitted them against Liverpool and Lazio where Gilzean scored a consolation goal as a tired St Pats lost 4–1.

In October 1999, Gilzean moved to Glentoran. Gilzean scored the winning goal in the 2000 Irish Cup Final.
