= Ken Gillard =

Irish footballer

Personal information
- Full name: Kenneth Joseph Gillard
- Date of birth: 30 April 1972 (age 54)
- Place of birth: Dublin, Ireland
- Position: Left back

Youth career
- Belvedere
- Luton Town

Senior career*
| Years | Team | Apps | (Gls) |
| 1992–1994 | Northampton Town | 23 | (0) |
- Chesham United
- Hitchin Town

International career
- Republic of Ireland U21
- * Club domestic league appearances and goals

Ken Gillard (born 30 April 1972) is an Irish former professional footballer who played as a left back. He is a youth team coach at Arsenal.

== Playing career ==
Born in Dublin, He started his career as a youth player at Luton Town but failed to make a first team appearance. He then joined Northampton Town, where he made 23 appearances in the Football League. After leaving Northampton he played for non-League sides Chesham United and Hitchin Town.

== Coaching career ==
He joined Nuneaton as assistant manager to his former Northampton teammate Kevin Wilkin in 2008. He had previously held similar roles at Barton Rovers and Hitchin Town.

== International career ==
Gillard played for the Republic of Ireland under-21 side during the early 1990s.
