= Ian Brown (footballer, born 1965) =

English footballer and manager

Personal information
- Full name: Ian O'Neill Brown
- Date of birth: 11 September 1965 (age 61)
- Place of birth: Ipswich, England
- Position: Striker

Youth career
- Luton Town

Senior career*
| Years | Team | Apps | (Gls) |
| 1984–1985 | Birmingham City | 0 | (0) |
| 1985–19?? | Felixstowe Town | | |
- Sudbury Town
- Stowmarket Town
| 1989 | Harwich & Parkeston | | |
- Felixstowe Town
| 1991–1993 | Chelmsford City | 73 | (29) |
| 1992 | → Sudbury Town (loan) | | |
| 1993–1995 | Bristol City | 12 | (1) |
| 1994 | → Colchester United (loan) | 4 | (1) |
| 1994–1995 | Northampton Town | 23 | (4) |
| 1995–1998 | Sudbury Town | | (87) |
| 1998–1999 | Cambridge City | | (10) |
- Felixstowe & Walton United
- Braintree Town
- Witham Town
- Clacton Town
- Maldon Town
| 2005–2007 | Whitton United | 12 | (2) |

Managerial career
- 2009–2011: Whitton United
- 2015–2016: Hadleigh United
- * Club domestic league appearances and goals

Ian O'Neill Brown (born 11 September 1965) is an English football manager and former player.

== Biography ==
A striker, he was a schoolboy at Luton Town before beginning his professional career at Birmingham City, but dropped into non-League after only playing for 10 minutes as a substitute in a Football League Cup match. He played for several clubs in the Eastern Counties League, including Harwich & Parkeston, where he played under former Arsenal player, Richie Powling, then later Chelmsford City, before returning to the professional game with Bristol City in 1993. After a loan spell at Colchester United and less than a year with Northampton Town, he returned to non-League with Sudbury Town, reuniting with Powling.

He was later signed by Powling for Cambridge City and Braintree Town, and after a spell at Maldon Town, went on to become a player-coach at Whitton United. After a spell as coach and assistant manager at Ipswich Wanderers, he was appointed manager of Whitton United in 2009. He left the club in 2011, becoming a coach at Hadleigh United, before joining A.F.C. Sudbury as first team coach in November 2012. He later became assistant manager, before leaving the club in 2014. In 2015, he was appointed manager of Hadleigh United, a position he held until resigning in May 2016. The following year he was appointed joint manager of the Suffolk FA's under-18 team. He also works as a tutor at One College.
