= Christian McClean =

English footballer (born 1963)

Personal information
- Full name: Christian Alphonso McClean
- Date of birth: 17 October 1963 (age 63)
- Place of birth: Colchester, England
- Height: 6 ft 5 in (1.96 m)
- Position: Striker

Senior career*
Years	Team	Apps	(Gls)
- Clacton Town
1987–1991	Bristol Rovers	51	(6)
1991–1992	Swansea City	4	(0)
1991–1992	Northampton Town	19	(3)
- Chelmsford City
- Sudbury Town
- Heybridge Swifts
- * Club domestic league appearances and goals

Christian Alphonso McClean is an English former professional footballer who played as a striker in the Football League for Bristol Rovers, Swansea City and Northampton Town.

== Biography ==
Born in Colchester in Essex in 1963, McClean turned professional in 1987 after signing for Bristol Rovers from Essex non-League club Clacton Town. During his time at Rovers he played 51 league matches, scoring six goals. He also played at Wembley Stadium when Rovers reached the final of the Football League Trophy, losing 2–1 to Tranmere Rovers.

In 1991, he was transferred to Swansea City, but after making only four league appearances for the club, he moved to Northampton Town. In 1992, he returned to non-League football with Essex club Chelmsford City. He later played for Sudbury Town, scoring the goal that put them ahead against Brentford in the club's first appearance in the second round of the FA Cup.

A popular player with Bristol Rovers supporters, he continues to regularly attend Rovers games. In May 2016 he was knocked unconscious in a hit-and-run attack in Marks Tey in Essex.

== Honours ==
Bristol Rovers

- Football League Third Division: 1989–90
- Associate Members' Cup runner-up: 1989–90
