= Morrys Scott =

Welsh footballer and manager

Personal information
- Full name: Morrys James Scott
- Date of birth: 17 December 1970 (age 55)
- Place of birth: Swansea, Wales
- Position: Forward

Team information
- Current team: Port Talbot Town (Assistant Manager)

Senior career*
Years	Team	Apps	(Gls)
1989–1990	Cardiff City	9	(0)
1990	Colchester United	0	(0)
1990–1991	Southend United	0	(0)
1991–1992	Plymouth Argyle	6	(0)
1992–1993	Northampton Town	17	(2)
1993–1994	Slough Town		(14)
1994–1995	Barry Town	3	(0)
1995–1996	Afan Lido	24	(17)
1996–1997	Briton Ferry Athletic	23	(10)
1997	Inter Cabletel	15	(0)
1997–1998	Rhayader Town	2	(7)
1998	Afan Lido	5	(0)
1998–1999	Haverfordwest County	7	(0)
1999–2001	Afan Lido	23	(1)
- * Club domestic league appearances and goals

Morrys James Scott (born 17 December 1970) is a Welsh former professional footballer. He made a total 32 appearances in The Football League between 1989 and 1993 before moving into the Welsh Premier League.

== Career ==
Despite being born in Swansea, Scott began his career at Cardiff City, the local rivals of his hometown club, making nine appearances during the 1989–90 season, his only start coming in a 3–1 defeat to Leyton Orient. At the end of the season he was released as they suffered relegation to Division Four. He had short spells with Colchester United and Southend United without making a first-team appearance for either side.

In 1991, he joined Plymouth Argyle, making six appearances during a one-year spell. At the start of the 1992–93 season, he joined Northampton Town on a non-contract basis where he scored his first goals as a professional player but was not offered an extended deal and subsequently left the club. After a spell playing non-league football, he signed with Welsh Premier League side Barry Town for the 1994–95 season. He played just three times in the league during the season but did play in both legs of their 7-0 aggregate defeat to Lithuanian side Žalgiris Vilnius in the UEFA Cup Winners' Cup. Scott spent the next six years in the Welsh Premier League with five different clubs, most notably with Afan Lido where he made over 50 appearances during his three spells with the side.
