= Mark Taylor (footballer, born 1974) =

English footballer

Personal information
- Full name: Mark Simon Taylor
- Date of birth: 8 November 1974 (age 51)
- Place of birth: Saltburn, England
- Height: 6 ft 2 in (1.88 m)
- Position: Left back

Youth career
- –: Middlesbrough

Senior career*
Years	Team	Apps	(Gls)
1993–1995	Middlesbrough	0	(0)
1994	→ Darlington (loan)	8	(0)
1995–1996	Fulham	7	(0)
1996	Northampton Town	1	(0)
–	Netherfield		
- * Club domestic league appearances and goals

Mark Simon Taylor (born 8 November 1974) is an English former footballer who played as a left back in the Football League for Darlington, Fulham and Northampton Town. He began his career with Middlesbrough, but never played for them in the League, and also played non-league football for Netherfield.
