= Craig Adams (footballer) =

English footballer

Personal information
- Full name: Craig John Adams
- Date of birth: 9 November 1974 (age 51)
- Place of birth: Northampton, England
- Position: Central defender

Senior career*
Years	Team	Apps	(Gls)
1991–1994	Northampton Town	1	(0)

Managerial career
- 2012–2014: Wellingborough Town
- 2014–2015: Bedford Town
- 2015: Wellingborough Town (caretaker)
- * Club domestic league appearances and goals

Craig John Adams (born 9 November 1974) is an English former footballer who played in the Football League for Northampton Town.

Adams left after a poor start to the season to become caretaker manager at his former club Wellingborough Town. In May 2016, Adams left his position as Peterborough United Under 16's manager to become the assistant manager to Chris Nunn at Biggleswade Town
