= Terry Angus =

English footballer (born 1966)

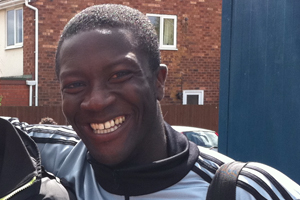

Personal information
- Full name: Terence Norman Angus
- Date of birth: 14 January 1966 (age 60)
- Place of birth: Coventry, England
- Height: 1.83 m (6 ft 0 in)
- Position: Central defender

Senior career*
Years	Team	Apps	(Gls)
- Coventry Sporting
1989–1990	VS Rugby		
1990–1993	Northampton Town	116	(6)
1993–1997	Fulham	122	(5)
1997–1998	Slough Town	33	(1)
1998–2006	Nuneaton Borough		
- Solihull Borough
- Brackley Town
- Stratford Town
Total		269	(12)
- * Club domestic league appearances and goals

Terence Norman Angus (born 14 January 1966) is an English retired professional footballer who played as a central defender.

== Playing career ==
Born in Coventry, Angus played for Coventry Sporting, VS Rugby, Northampton Town, Fulham, Slough Town, Nuneaton Borough, Solihull Borough, Brackley Town and Stratford Town.

Angus was still active as a player up to the age of 40.

== Later career ==
Angus later worked as a probation officer, for the Prince's Trust at Solihull College, and for Professional Footballers' Association.

== Personal life ==
Angus is of Jamaican descent. He is the father of Dior Angus who is also a professional footballer.
