= Danny O'Shea (footballer) =

English footballer (born 1963)

Personal information
- Date of birth: 26 March 1963 (age 63)
- Place of birth: Newington, London, England
- Height: 6 ft 0 in (1.83 m)
- Position: Midfielder

Youth career
- 1978–1980: Arsenal

Senior career*
Years	Team	Apps	(Gls)
1980–1984	Arsenal	6	(0)
1984	→ Charlton Athletic (loan)	9	(0)
1984–1985	Exeter City	45	(2)
1985–1989	Southend United	118	(12)
1989–1995	Cambridge United	203	(1)
1995–1997	Northampton Town	80	(1)
1995	→ Wimbledon (loan)	0	(0)
1997	Rushden & Diamonds		
1997–1998	Aylesbury United		
1998–1999	Canvey Island		
- * Club domestic league appearances and goals

Daniel O'Shea (born 26 March 1963) is an English former professional footballer who made 461 appearances in the Football League in a career that lasted more than 15 years.

== Career ==
O'Shea, born in Newington, London, came through the Arsenal youth system to make his league debut on 30 October 1982 in a goalless draw at home to Birmingham City, and played 9 times in all competitions for the Highbury outfit between 1982 and 1983. He also had a loan spell with Charlton Athletic before making a permanent move to Exeter City where he established himself as a regular first teamer and made 45 league appearances, scoring twice.

Predominantly a midfield player who moved into defence later in his career, in August 1985 he joined Southend United, where he spent four years and played 139 games in all competitions, scoring 12 goals. Released at the end of the 1988–89 season on a free transfer, he signed for Cambridge United together with Southend teammate Martin Robinson. While Robinson only spent a season at the Abbey Stadium, O'Shea stayed until 1995, playing a major role in the success the club enjoyed in nearly reaching the Premier League under manager John Beck. O'Shea captained the United side as they played a FA Cup quarter-final tie at his old club Arsenal in 1991, though he ended on the losing side that day.

After playing more than 250 games for the club and having a spell as player-coach when Gary Johnson took charge, O'Shea left the club in 1995. Following this, he joined Northampton Town as player-assistant manager to former Cambridge United manager Ian Atkins. During the Summer of 1995 O'Shea made an appearance on loan in Wimbledon's ill-fated Intertoto Cup campaign, though did not do enough to earn a full-time contract with the Premier League club. He played a further 80 league games for Northampton before moving into non-League football in 1997 first with Rushden & Diamonds, then Aylesbury United before finishing his playing career with Canvey Island.

== Honours ==
Cambridge United

- Football League Third Division: 1990–91
- Football League Fourth Division play-offs: 1990
