= Jason Burnham =

English footballer

Personal information
- Date of birth: 8 May 1973 (age 53)
- Place of birth: Mansfield, England
- Position: Full back

Senior career*
Years	Team	Apps	(Gls)
1991–1994	Northampton Town	88	(2)
1994–1996	Chester City	64	(1)
Total		152	(3)
- * Club domestic league appearances and goals

Jason Burnham (born 8 May 1973) is an English footballer, who played as a full back in the Football League for Northampton Town and Chester City.
