= Paul Moody (footballer) =

English footballer

Personal information
- Date of birth: 13 June 1967 (age 59)
- Place of birth: Portsmouth, England
- Height: 6 ft 3 in (1.91 m)
- Position: Forward

Senior career*
Years	Team	Apps	(Gls)
- Fareham Town
1990–1991	Waterlooville		
1991–1994	Southampton	12	(0)
1992	→ Reading (loan)	5	(1)
1994–1997	Oxford United	136	(49)
1997–1999	Fulham	40	(19)
1999–2001	Millwall	60	(25)
2001–2002	Oxford United	35	(13)
2002–2003	Aldershot Town	19	(6)
- Gosport Borough
- * Club domestic league appearances and goals

Paul Moody (born 13 June 1967) is an English former football forward.

== Career ==
Moody was signed by Southampton from non league Waterlooville in August 1991. After failing to secure regular first team football at Saints, Moody joined Oxford initially on loan in Feb 1994 and permanent deal was secured soon after. Moody became a fans favourite at the Manor Ground. Fulham signed Moody the summer of 1997 to spearhead the promotion push required by Mohammed Al Fayed. Moody remained at Craven Cottage until the summer of 1999. During his time at Fulham he suffered a broken leg but scored a hat trick on his return to the first team as Fulham celebrated winning the Division 2 title. Moody was signed by London neighbours Millwall in June 1999 for £150,000. Moody became a fans favourite in his 2 years at the Den due his uncompromising style of play. Moody formed a lethal partnership with Neil Harris and won yet another Division 2 title with the Lions. In September 2001 Moody returned to Oxford, initially on loan but a £150,000 fee was agreed a week later for a permanent deal. After an initially bright start at Oxford things began to deteriorate due to results and change of manager Moody left in the summer of 2002 and joined Isthmian League side Aldershot Town. Moody started well at Aldershot but was frozen out of team around Christmas 2002... he never played for Aldershot again and after becoming disillusioned with the game he retired from the full-time game in 2003. Moody had a short spell at Wessex League side Gosport Borough but retired completely after injury problems.

== Honours ==
Millwall

- Football League Second Division: 2000–01
