= Darren Harmon =

English footballer

Personal information
- Full name: Darren John Harmon
- Date of birth: 30 January 1973 (age 53)
- Place of birth: Northampton, England
- Height: 1.65 m (5 ft 5 in)
- Position: Midfielder

Youth career
- Cogenhoe United
- Notts County

Senior career*
Years	Team	Apps	(Gls)
1991–1992	Notts County	0	(0)
1992	Shrewsbury Town	6	(2)
1992–1996	Northampton Town	89	(12)
- Kettering Town
- Buckingham Town
2000	Ford Sports		
2001	Readflex Rangers		
2002–2003	Newport Pagnell Town		
2003	Buckingham Town		
Total		95	(14)
- * Club domestic league appearances and goals

Darren John Harmon (born 30 January 1973) is an English former professional footballer who played as a midfielder.

== Early and personal life ==
Born in Northampton, his son Dan was also a footballer, who, like his father, also played for Northampton Town and Kettering Town.

== Career ==
Harmon began his career with Cogenhoe United. He then played professionally for Notts County, Shrewsbury Town and Northampton Town, making 95 appearances in the Football League. He next played for and Kettering Town, but left them because he was "fed up" with travelling to away games; he worked as a computer salesman whilst playing for local teams including Buckingham Town and Ford Sports. By 2001 he was playing for Readflex Rangers. In 2002–03 he was playing for Newport Pagnell Town. By October 2003 he was back at Buckingham Town.
