= Kevin Wilkin =

English footballer and manager

Personal information
- Full name: Kevin Wilkin
- Date of birth: 1 October 1967 (age 59)
- Place of birth: Cambridge, England
- Height: 6 ft 0 in (1.83 m)
- Position: Striker

Team information
- Current team: AFC Telford United (manager)

Senior career*
Years	Team	Apps	(Gls)
- Cambridge City
1990–1995	Northampton Town	78	(11)
1995–1997	Rushden & Diamonds		
1997–1998	Nuneaton Borough		
1998–2002	Cambridge City		
2002–2004	Grantham Town		
2004–2008	Nuneaton Borough		

Managerial career
- 2006–2014: Nuneaton Borough
- 2014–2015: Wrexham
- 2015–2022: Brackley Town
- 2022–: AFC Telford United
- * Club domestic league appearances and goals

Kevin Wilkin (born 1 October 1967) is an English football manager and former professional footballer. He is the manager of AFC Telford United.

== Playing career ==
Born in Cambridge but raised in the Cambridgeshire village of Milton, Wilkin started his career with hometown side Cambridge City, before moving into the Football League and turning professional with Northampton Town. Later spells followed with Rushden and Diamonds, Nuneaton Borough, Cambridge City and Grantham Town, before returning to Nuneaton as player/assistant manager to Roger Ashby in 2004.

== Managerial career ==
=== Nuneaton Borough ===
Following the sacking of Ashby in 2006, he was appointed caretaker manager and was subsequently given the job on a permanent basis. After Nuneaton Borough were liquidated at the end of the 2007–08 season he was appointed manager of the reformed club,. He guided the team to a second-place finish in the Southern League Division One Midlands and promotion at the first attempt, beating Chasetown in the play-off final. The next season, he guided the team to a second successive promotion, beating Chippenham Town in the play-off final after finishing second in the Southern League Premier Division. In 2012, Nuneaton Borough finished the season in fifth place in the Conference North and won the play-off final, after beating Gainsborough Trinity 1–0, guiding them back to the Conference Premier after a nine-year absence.

=== Wrexham ===
Wilkin was appointed manager of Nuneaton's Conference Premier rivals Wrexham on a two-year contract on 20 March 2014. Wilkin's first game in charge was against Salisbury City, where his new side drew 1–1. He made changes to the squad early, by re-signing former youngster Bradley Reid on loan, whilst releasing Brett Ormerod. He saw out the season finishing in a club record low place of 17th.

Over the summer of 2014 he completely re-shaped the club, releasing Robert Ogleby, Kyle Parle, David Artell, Jay Colback and Joe Anyinsah, Kevin Thornton and Stephen Wright and Leon Clowes. Although Wilkin made attempts to negotiate renewing contracts, Johnny Hunt and Joslain Mayebi left the club. His recruitment was successful over the summer, with Blaine Hudson the first arrival from Cambridge United. More followed as Wes York and Louis Moult followed from former club Nuneaton. Others included Manny Smith, Connor Jennings and Dan Bachmann on loan from Stoke City. The season began with a win over Dartford, with Wes York bagging a brace. But the first home game of the season saw Wrexham lose 3–0 to Gateshead.

League form dipped over the season, but an FA Cup run saw Wrexham reach the 3rd round, where they faced Stoke City. Mark Carrington gave Wrexham the lead against the Premier League side, but they went on to lose 3–1. Wilkin used the loan system, bringing in the likes of Scott Tancock (Swansea City), Joe Thompson (Bury), Jon Flatt (Wolves), Dan Holman (Colchester United), Sam Finley (TNS), Johnny Hunt (Cambridge United), James Pearson (Leicester City) and Kieron Morris (Walsall). Wilkin's successes in the cups continued in the FA Trophy, as he reached the Semi-Final against Torquay United. Wrexham beat them in both the home and away tie to progress to Wembley Stadium.

Although doing well in the Trophy, Wrexham's form dipped, winning just twice in the seven games between the semi and the final. At Wembley Wrexham faced North Ferriby United, a part-time side from the Conference North. Wrexham lead 2–0 through Louis Moult and Jay Harris. But United came back to level at 2–2, before extra-time and penalties saw the FA Trophy go North Ferriby's way. This would be Wilkin's last game, as he was sacked by the board less than 24 hours later.

=== Brackley Town ===
On 21 September 2015, Wilkin was appointed manager of National League North club Brackley Town. On 20 May 2018, Brackley defeated National League club Bromley in the 2018 FA Trophy Final to lift the trophy for the first time in the club's history.

On 29 September 2022, Wilkin was sacked as manager with the club sitting in eighth position in the league.

=== AFC Telford United ===
On 10 October 2022, Wilkin was appointed manager at AFC Telford United.

Wilkin succeeded Paul Carden as the Bucks manager, taking over with the club in 23rd place in the Vanarama National League North, with just 7 points from 12 matches. Wilkin was unable to turn the club's fortunes around, and they were relegated, finishing 24th in the table.

Wilkin undertook a near-total reassembly of the Bucks' squad in preparation for competing in the Pitching In Southern League Premier Central. Only Jordan Piggott, Byron Moore and Montel Gibson were retained, and Wilkin drafted in the likes of Brandon Hall, Ellis Myles, Orrin Pendley, Nathan Fox, Fraser Kerr and Jared Hodgkiss, along with younger blood in Remi Walker and Ricardo Dinanga.

The Bucks overcame an indifferent start to eventually put together a long unbeaten run. Finishing second in the league, they overcame Mickleover FC in the play-off semi-final but lost 1-0 to Leamington FC in the final.

The 2024/25 season began with Telford amongst the promotion favourites, but they were unable to keep up with the pace set by league leaders Kettering Town. Wilkin again remodelled the team in mid-season, adding players such as Luke Rowe, Dylan Allen-Hadley, and Oliver Cawthorne, and they finished third, qualifying for the playoffs once more.

After defeating Halesowen Town in the playoff semi-final, the Bucks won promotion back to the National League North, defeating Kettering Town 4-2 in the final.

Wilkin signed a contract extension at the beginning of the 2025/26 season.

== Honours ==
Wrexham

- FA Trophy runner-up: 2014–15

Brackley Town

- FA Trophy: 2017–18
