= Lee Colkin =

English footballer

Personal information
- Date of birth: 15 July 1974 (age 52)
- Place of birth: Nuneaton, England
- Position: Defender

Team information
- Current team: Rugby Town

Youth career
- Northampton Town

Senior career*
Years	Team	Apps	(Gls)
1992–1998	Northampton Town	99	(3)
1997	→ Leyton Orient (loan)	11	(0)
1998–2001	Hednesford Town		
2001–2003	Morecambe	54	(0)
2003–2004	Burton Albion	14	(1)
2004	Grantham Town	1	(0)
2004–2005	Tamworth	28	(1)
2005–2006	Hinckley United	18	(2)
2006	Kettering Town		
2006	Hucknall Town		
2006–2007	Barwell		
2007–2008	Stamford		
2008–2009	Ellistown		
2009	Atherstone Town		
2009	Stratford Town		

Managerial career
- 2009–: Rugby Town
- * Club domestic league appearances and goals

Lee Colkin (born 15 July 1974) is an English former professional footballer who played in the Football League as a defender for Northampton Town and Leyton Orient. He then moved into non-League football to play for Hednesford Town, Morecambe, Burton Albion, Grantham Town, Tamworth, Hinckley United, Kettering Town, Hucknall Town, Barwell, Stamford, Ellistown, where he was player-assistant manager, Atherstone Town and Stratford Town.
