= 1908–09 Northampton Town F.C. season =

Northampton Town
1908–09 season
- Manager: Herbert Chapman
- Stadium: County Ground
- Southern League: 1st
- FA Cup: First round
- Charity Shield: Runners-up
- Top goalscorer: League: Albert Lewis (30); All: Albert Lewis (31)

The 1908–09 season was Northampton Town's 12th season in their history and the eighth successive season in the Southern League. Alongside competing in the Southern League, the club also participated in the FA Cup and FA Charity Shield.

== Players ==
As of match played 28 April 1909.

Name	Position	Nat.	Place of Birth	Date of Birth (Age)	Apps	Goals	Previous club	Date signed	Fee
Goalkeepers
William Bailiff	GK	(Wales)	Ruabon	19 March 1882 (aged 27)	2	0	Druids	November 1907	
George Cooch	GK	(England)	Wellingborough	N/A	119	0	Kettering Town	Summer 1905	
Robert Haywood	GK	(England)	Eltham	16 September 1887 (aged 21)	1	0	N/A	Summer 1908	N/A
Full backs
Bob Bonthron	RB	(Scotland)	Burntisland	1 January 1880 (aged 29)	34	0	Birmingham City	Summer 1908	
Richard Britton	RB	(England)	Isle of Wight	7 August 1887 (aged 21)	24	0	Portsmouth	Summer 1907	
Lloyd Davies	LB	(Wales)	Cefn Mawr	23 February 1877 (aged 32)	67	2	Stoke	November 1907	
Half backs
Fred Dunkley	CH	(England)	Northampton	1 January 1874 (aged 35)	82	2	Earls Barton	Summer 1906	
William Hickleton	CH	(England)	Newcastle upon Tyne	1 January 1884 (aged 25)	36	2	Portsmouth	Summer 1907	
Jock Manning	WH	(Scotland)	Burntisland	N/A	40	2	Blackburn Rovers	Summer 1908	
Dave McCartney (c)	WH	(Scotland)	Cronberry	26 December 1875 (aged 33)	77	8	Chelsea	Summer 1907	
Jack Rawlings	WH	(England)	N/A	N/A	3	0	N/A	Summer 1907	N/A
Inside/Outside forwards
George Badenoch	OF	(Scotland)	Kelton	9 April 1882 (aged 27)	49	4	Tottenham Hotspur	Summer 1907	
Herbert Chapman	OF	(England)	Kiveton Park	19 January 1878 (aged 31)	80	39	Tottenham Hotspur	Summer 1907	
Edwin Freeman	OF	(England)	Northampton	5 June 1886 (aged 22)	74	14	Regent Templars	Summer 1905	
Frank McDiarmid	IF	(Scotland)	Dundee	11 May 1881 (aged 27)	77	17	Tottenham Hotspur	Summer 1907	
Harry Sharman	IF	(England)	London	N/A	2	0	Battersea Park	Summer 1906	
Albert Lewis	IF	(England)	Wolverhampton	1 January 1884 (aged 25)	42	31	Coventry City	Summer 1908	
Frank Kilsby	IF	(England)	Fenny Stratford	N/A	6	3	Preston North End	Summer 1907	
Robert Walker	IF	(England)	Northallerton	1 January 1884 (aged 25)	41	13	New Brompton	Summer 1908	
Centre forwards
Fred Lessons	CF	(England)	Heaton Norris	30 August 1883 (aged 25)	77	32	Nottingham Forest	Summer 1907	

== Competitions ==
=== Southern League ===
==== League table ====
Pos	Team	Pld	W	D	L	GF	GA	GR	Pts
1	Northampton Town	40	25	5	10	90	45	2.000	55
2	Swindon Town	40	22	5	13	96	55	1.745	49
3	Southampton	40	19	10	11	67	58	1.155	48
4	Portsmouth	40	18	10	12	68	60	1.133	46
5	Bristol Rovers	40	17	9	14	60	63	0.952	43

Rules for classification: The system of using goal average to separate two teams tied on points was used until the 1976-77 season. The points system: 2 points for a win, 1 point for a draw and 0 points for losing.

==== Results summary ====
Overall								Home						Away					
Pld	W	D	L	GF	GA	GD	Pts	W	D	L	GF	GA	GD	W	D	L	GF	GA	GD
40	25	5	10	90	45	+45	80	15	3	2	55	14	+41	10	2	8	35	31	+4

Last updated: 26 April 2022.

==== League position by match ====
Round	1	2	3	4	5	6	7	8	9	10	11	12	13	14	15	16	17	18	19	20	21	22	23	24	25	26	27	28	29	30	31	32	33	34	35	36	37	38	39	40
Ground	A	H	H	A	H	A	H	A	H	A	H	A	H	A	H	A	H	A	H	H	A	H	A	H	A	H	A	H	A	H	A	H	A	A	H	A	H	A	A	H
Result	W	W	D	L	W	L	W	W	W	L	W	W	W	L	D	W	W	W	W	W	W	W	L	L	W	D	W	W	W	W	L	W	L	W	L	D	W	L	D	W

A = Away; H = Home; W = Win; D = Draw; L = Loss

==== Matches ====
Win Draw Loss

2 September 1908 1	New Brompton	0–2	Northampton Town	Gillingham
15:00			F.Lessons; E.Freeman	Stadium: Priestfield; Attendance: 3,000

5 September 1908 2	Northampton Town	3–1	Coventry City	Northampton
15:00	A.Lewis; Walker; F.McDiarmid			Stadium: County Ground; Attendance: 1,000

10 September 1908 3	Northampton Town	0–0	Queens Park Rangers	Northampton
15:00				Stadium: County Ground; Attendance: 5,000

12 September 1908 4	Bristol Rovers	1–0	Northampton Town	Bristol
15:00				Stadium: Eastville Stadium; Attendance: 1,200

19 September 1908 5	Northampton Town	7–0	Watford	Northampton
15:00	R.Walker; F.Lessons; W.Hickleton; J.Manning; G.Badenoch			Stadium: County Ground; Attendance: 8,000

26 September 1908 6	Norwich City	1–0	Northampton Town	Norwich
15:00				Stadium: The Nest; Attendance: 6,095

3 October 1908 7	Northampton Town	3–2	Reading	Northampton
15:00	A.Lewis; F.Lessons			Stadium: County Ground; Attendance: 6,000

10 October 1908 8	Southampton	2–3	Northampton Town	Southampton
15:00			A.Lewis; F.Lessons	Stadium: The Dell; Attendance: 6,000

17 October 1908 9	Northampton Town	5–0	Leyton	Northampton
15:00	A.Lewis; F.Lessons; R.Walker			Stadium: County Ground; Attendance: 8,000

24 October 1908 10	West Ham United	2–1	Northampton Town	Upton Park, London
15:00			A.Lewis	Stadium: Boleyn Ground; Attendance: 9,000

31 October 1908 11	Northampton Town	2–1	Brighton	Northampton
15:00	R.Walker; E.Freeman			Stadium: County Ground; Attendance: 8,000

7 November 1908 12	Crystal Palace	2–3	Northampton Town	Crystal Palace, London
15:00			F.Lessons; F.McDiarmid	Stadium: Crystal Palace Park; Attendance: 1,200

14 November 1908 13	Northampton Town	4–2	Brentford	Northampton
15:00	A.Lewis; F.Lessons; R.Walker			Stadium: County Ground; Attendance: 7,000

21 November 1908 14	Luton Town	3–1	Northampton Town	Luton
15:00			F.McDiarmid	Stadium: Kenilworth Road; Attendance: 8,000

28 November 1908 15	Northampton Town	1–1	Swindon Town	Northampton
15:00	R.Walker 86'	Report	Tout pen.'	Stadium: County Ground; Attendance: 8,000; Referee: T Robinson

5 December 1908 16	Portsmouth	3–4	Northampton Town	Portsmouth
15:00			F.Lessons; R.Walker; F.McDiarmid	Stadium: Fratton Park; Attendance: 8,000

12 December 1908 17	Northampton Town	1–0	Exeter City	Northampton
15:00	A.Lewis			Stadium: County Ground; Attendance: 8,000

19 December 1908 18	Plymouth Argyle	0–2	Northampton Town	Plymouth
15:00			A.Lewis; F.Lessons	Stadium: Home Park

26 December 1908 19	Northampton Town	2–1	Southend United	Northampton
15:00	F.Dunkley			Stadium: County Ground; Attendance: 15,000

28 December 1908 20	Northampton Town	7–0	New Brompton	Northampton
15:00	A.Lewis; F.McDiarmid; F.Lessons			Stadium: County Ground; Attendance: 10,000

2 January 1909 21	Coventry City	1–4	Northampton Town	Coventry
15:00			F.Lessons; A.Lewis; R.Walker	Stadium: Highfield Road; Attendance: 6,000

9 January 1909 22	Northampton Town	3–0	Bristol Rovers	Northampton
15:00	R.Walker; F.Lessons; A.Lewis			Stadium: County Ground; Attendance: 7,000

23 January 1909 23	Watford	4–1	Northampton Town	Watford
15:00			F.Lessons	Stadium: Cassio Road; Attendance: 4,000

30 January 1909 24	Northampton Town	1–2	Norwich City	Northampton
15:00	A.Lewis			Stadium: County Ground; Attendance: 7,000

6 February 1909 25	Reading	1–2	Northampton Town	Reading
15:00			R.Walker; A.Lewis	Stadium: Elm Park

13 February 1909 26	Northampton Town	1–1	Southampton	Northampton
15:00	A.Lewis			Stadium: County Ground; Attendance: 8,000

20 February 1909 27	Leyton	0–1	Northampton Town	Leyton, London
15:00			F.Lessons	Stadium: Wingate-Leyton Stadium; Attendance: 6,000

27 February 1909 28	Northampton Town	6–0	West Ham United	Northampton
15:00	F.McDiarmid; J.Manning; F.Lessons; E.Freeman; A.Lewis; L.Davies			Stadium: County Ground; Attendance: 5,000

6 March 1909 29	Brighton	2–4	Northampton Town	Hove
15:00			A.Lewis; F.Lessons	Stadium: Goldstone Ground; Attendance: 4,000

13 March 1909 30	Northampton Town	1–0	Crystal Palace	Northampton
15:00	R.Walker			Stadium: County Ground; Attendance: 8,000

20 March 1909 31	Brentford	3–1	Northampton Town	Brentford, London
15:00			A.Lewis	Stadium: Griffin Park; Attendance: 7,000

27 March 1909 32	Northampton Town	3–0	Luton Town	Northampton
15:00	F.McDiarmid; F.Lessons			Stadium: County Ground; Attendance: 14,000

3 April 1909 33	Swindon Town	1–0	Northampton Town	Swindon
15:00	J.Lavery 70'	Report		Stadium: County Ground; Attendance: 9,000; Referee: E.Childs

9 April 1909 34	Millwall	0–2	Northampton Town	Isle of Dogs, London
15:00			A.Lewis; E.Freeman	Stadium: Athletic Ground; Attendance: 1,000

10 April 1909 35	Northampton Town	0–1	Portsmouth	Northampton
15:00				Stadium: County Ground; Attendance: 12,000

12 April 1909 36	Southend United	2–2	Northampton Town	Southend-on-Sea
15:00			A.Lewis pen.'	Stadium: Kursaal; Attendance: 7,000

13 April 1909 37	Northampton Town	3–1	Millwall	Northampton
15:00	E.Freeman; F.McDiarmid; F.Lessons			Stadium: County Ground; Attendance: 9,000

17 April 1909 38	Exeter City	2–1	Northampton Town	Exeter
15:00			E.Freeman	Stadium: St James Park; Attendance: 8,000

19 April 1909 39	Queens Park Rangers	1–1	Northampton Town	Park Royal, London
15:00			E.Freeman	Stadium: Park Royal Stadium; Attendance: 3,000

24 April 1909 40	Northampton Town	2–1	Plymouth Argyle	Northampton
15:00	R.Walker; D.McCartney			Stadium: County Ground

=== FA Cup ===
16 January 1909 First round	Northampton Town	1–1	Derby County	Northampton
15:00	F.McDiarmid			Stadium: County Ground

20 January 1909 First round (r)	Derby County	4–2	Northampton Town	Derby
15:00			D.McCartney; A.Lewis	Stadium: Baseball Ground

=== Charity Shield ===
28 April 1909 Charity Shield	Newcastle United	2–0	Northampton Town	Fulham, London
17:00	J.Allan; J.Rutherford			Stadium: Stamford Bridge; Attendance: 7,000

=== Appearances and goals ===
Pos	Player	Southern League		FA Cup		Charity Shield		Total	
Pos	Player	Starts	Goals	Starts	Goals	Starts	Goals	Starts	Goals
GK	William Bailiff	2	–	–	–	–	–	2	–
GK	George Cooch	37	–	2	–	1	–	40	–
GK	Robert Haywood	1	–	–	–	–	–	1	–
FB	Bob Bonthron	31	–	2	–	1	–	34	–
FB	Richard Britton	13	–	–	–	–	–	13	–
FB	Lloyd Davies	39	1	2	–	1	–	42	1
HB	Fred Dunkley	29	1	1	–	1	–	31	1
HB	William Hickleton	15	1	1	–	–	–	16	1
HB	Jock Manning	37	2	2	–	1	–	40	2
HB	Dave McCartney	34	2	2	1	1	–	37	3
HB	Jack Rawlings	2	–	–	–	–	–	2	–
OF	George Badenoch	13	1	–	–	–	–	13	1
OF	Herbert Chapman	1	–	–	–	–	–	1	–
OF	Edwin Freeman	28	7	2	–	1	–	31	7
OF	Frank McDiarmid	39	9	2	1	1	–	42	10
OF	Harry Sharman	1	–	–	–	–	–	1	–
IF	Albert Lewis	39	30	2	1	1	–	42	31
IF	Frank Kilsby	1	–	–	–	–	–	1	–
IF	Robert Walker	38	13	2	–	1	–	41	13
CF	Fred Lessons	40	23	2	–	1	–	43	23
