= 1909 FA Charity Shield =

Football match

- Event: FA Charity Shield
Newcastle United	Northampton Town
The Football League	Southern Football League
2	0
- Date: 28 April 1909
- Venue: Stamford Bridge, London
- Attendance: 7,000

The 1909 FA Charity Shield was the second Charity Shield, a football match contested by the winners of the previous season's Football League and Southern League competitions. The match was played on 28 April 1909, between 1908–09 Football League winners Newcastle United and 1908–09 Southern League champions Northampton Town. The match was played at Stamford Bridge, London, and ended with a 2–0 win for Newcastle United. The goals were scored either side of half-time, by Jack Allan and Jock Rutherford.

The Newcastle United team of the 1900s were the club's most successful team to date, with the 1909 Football League title being their third in five years. 1909 was the club's first appearance in the Charity Shield out of six, but the only one that they have won. Northampton Town had risen to prominence under the management of Herbert Chapman, a pioneering manager who would later go on to win the Football League with Huddersfield Town and Arsenal. Northampton won their only Southern League title in 1909, and joined the Football League when the Southern League was merged into it as Third Division South in 1921 The 1909 Charity Shield remains their only appearance in a national cup final.

The match raised £226 for charity, with £45 going to both clubs and twelve London hospitals each received between £5 and £10. Including the clubs' allowances, all but £12 went to medical charities.

== Match details ==
28 April 1909

Newcastle United	2–0	Northampton Town
Allan; Rutherford

Stamford Bridge, London
Attendance: 7,000

Newcastle United
Northampton Town

GK	1	(Scotland) Jimmy Lawrence
RB	2	(Ireland) Bill McCracken
LB	3	(British Cape Colony) Tony Whitson
LH	4	(Scotland) Peter McWilliam
WH	5	(England) Dave Willis
HB	6	(England) Colin Veitch (c)
HB	7	(England) Jack Allan
OL	8	(Scotland) Andrew Anderson
OL	9	(Scotland) George Wilson
OR	10	(England) Jackie Rutherford
CF	11	(Scotland) James Howie
Manager:
(Scotland) Frank Watt

GK	1	(England) George Cooch
RB	2	(Scotland) Bob Bonthron
LB	3	(Wales) Lloyd Davies
RH	4	(Scotland) Jock Manning
CH	5	(Scotland) Dave McCartney
LH	6	(England) Fred Dunkley
OR	7	(Scotland) Frank McDiarmid
IR	8	(England) Robert Walker
CF	9	(England) Fred Lessons
IL	10	(England) Albert Lewis
OL	11	(England) Edwin Freeman
Manager:
(England) Herbert Chapman
