= Southampton F.C. league record by opponent =

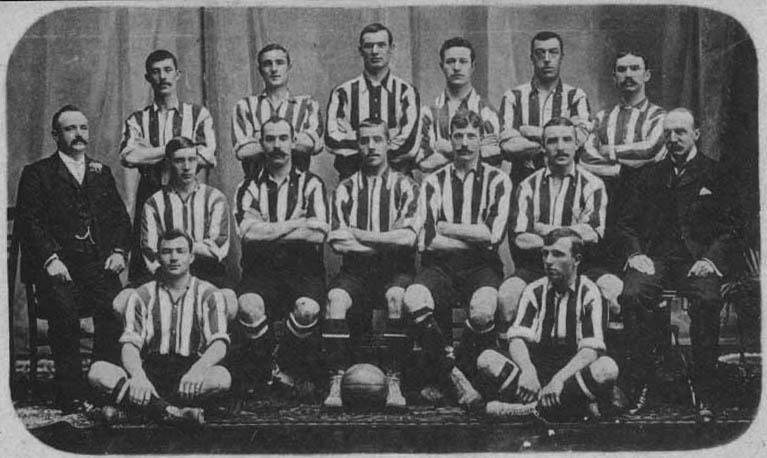
Southampton were founded in 1885, but did not play league football until the 1894–95 season, when they joined the Southern Football League. The team pictured above won the Southern League Division One title in 1903–04.

Southampton Football Club is an English professional association football club based in Southampton, Hampshire. Founded in 1885 as St Mary's Y.M.A. and later known as Southampton St Mary's, they became a professional club in 1891, and co-founded the Southern League in 1894. Southampton won the Southern League championship six times between 1896 and 1904, and were later elected to the Football League in 1920 as co-founders of the Third Division. The Saints finished as runners-up in their first season, and the following year received promotion to the Second Division as Third Division South champions. The club first entered the First Division in 1966, and currently play in its modern-day counterpart, the Premier League. Southampton won the FA Cup in 1976, reached the final of the League Cup in 1979 and 2017, and won the League Trophy in 2010.

Southampton's first team have competed in a number of regionally and nationally contested leagues. Their record against each club faced in these competitions is listed below. The club's first league match was against Chatham Town, their first Football League match was against Gillingham, and they met their 117th and most recent different league opponent, Wigan Athletic, for the first time in the 2012–13 season. The team that Southampton have met most often in league competition is Tottenham Hotspur, who they first played in the 1896–97 Southern League season; the 66 defeats from 154 meetings is more than they have lost against any other club. Coventry City tie with Tottenham Hotspur for most league draws against Southampton, with 39 in 122 meetings. The club have recorded more league victories against Queens Park Rangers than against any other club, having beaten them 53 out of 120 attempts.

== Table key ==
- The table below includes results of matches played by Southampton (including under the former names of St. Mary's Y.M.A. and Southampton St. Mary's) in the Southern League, the United League, the Southern District Combination, the Western League, the Football League and the Premier League. Matches from the abandoned 1939–40 season are excluded, as are those played during the various wartime competitions.
- The name used for each opponent is that which they had when Southampton most recently played a league match against them. Results against each opponent include results against that club under any former name. For example, results against Millwall include matches played against Millwall Athletic (until 1920).
- The columns headed "First" and "Last" contain the first and most recent seasons in which Southampton played league matches against each opponent.
- † Clubs with this background and symbol in the "Opponent" column are Southampton's divisional rivals in the current season.
- ‡ Clubs with this background and symbol in the "Opponent" column are defunct.

== League record ==
Results current as of 21 November 2026

Southampton F.C. league record by opponent
| Opponent | Pld | W | D | L | Pld | W | D | L | Pld | W | D | L | Win% | First | Last | Notes |
| Opponent | Home | | | | Away | | | | Total | | | | Win% | First | Last | Notes |
|---|---|---|---|---|---|---|---|---|---|---|---|---|---|---|---|---|
| Aberdare Athletic ‡ | 1 | 1 | 0 | 0 | 1 | 1 | 0 | 0 | 2 | 2 | 0 | 0 | 100.00 | 1921–22 | 1921–22 | |
| Accrington Stanley ‡ | 2 | 2 | 0 | 0 | 2 | 0 | 2 | 0 | 4 | 2 | 2 | 0 | 50.00 | 1958–59 | 1959–60 | |
| Aldershot ‡ | 5 | 3 | 2 | 0 | 5 | 1 | 2 | 2 | 10 | 4 | 4 | 2 | 40.00 | 1953–54 | 1957–58 | |
| Arsenal | 50 | 21 | 11 | 18 | 50 | 2 | 17 | 31 | 100 | 23 | 27 | 50 | 23.00 | 1897–98 | 2024–25 | (Note: Arsenal statistics include matches played against the club under their former name of Woolwich Arsenal.) |
| Aston Villa | 39 | 17 | 10 | 12 | 39 | 9 | 11 | 19 | 78 | 26 | 21 | 31 | 33.33 | 1936–37 | 2024–25 | |
| Barnsley | 27 | 15 | 6 | 6 | 27 | 6 | 7 | 14 | 54 | 21 | 13 | 20 | 38.89 | 1922–23 | 2011–12 | |
| Bedminster ‡ | 2 | 2 | 0 | 0 | 2 | 1 | 0 | 1 | 4 | 3 | 0 | 1 | 75.00 | 1898–99 | 1899–1900 | |
| Birmingham City † | 22 | 14 | 3 | 5 | 23 | 5 | 9 | 9 | 45 | 19 | 12 | 14 | 42.22 | 1946–47 | 2025–26 | |
| Blackburn Rovers † | 24 | 16 | 6 | 2 | 24 | 3 | 5 | 16 | 48 | 19 | 11 | 18 | 39.58 | 1936–37 | 2025–26 | |
| Blackpool | 21 | 13 | 6 | 2 | 21 | 4 | 2 | 15 | 42 | 17 | 8 | 17 | 40.48 | 1922–23 | 2011–12 | |
| Bolton Wanderers | 17 | 5 | 6 | 6 | 16 | 3 | 5 | 8 | 33 | 8 | 11 | 14 | 24.24 | 1933–34 | 2004–05 | |
| Bournemouth | 15 | 8 | 4 | 3 | 15 | 6 | 3 | 6 | 30 | 14 | 7 | 9 | 46.67 | 1953–54 | 2024–25 | (Note: Bournemouth statistics include matches played against the club under their former name of Bournemouth and Boscombe Athletic.) |
| Bradford City | 17 | 11 | 3 | 3 | 17 | 6 | 4 | 7 | 34 | 17 | 7 | 10 | 50.00 | 1922–23 | 2000–01 | |
| Bradford Park Avenue ‡ | 16 | 9 | 4 | 3 | 16 | 3 | 3 | 10 | 32 | 12 | 7 | 13 | 37.50 | 1907–08 | 1949–50 | |
| Brentford | 42 | 29 | 5 | 8 | 42 | 13 | 8 | 21 | 84 | 42 | 13 | 29 | 50.00 | 1901–02 | 2024–25 | |
| Brighton & Hove Albion | 41 | 21 | 11 | 9 | 41 | 12 | 12 | 17 | 82 | 33 | 23 | 26 | 40.24 | 1903–04 | 2024–25 | |
| Brighton United ‡ | 2 | 2 | 0 | 0 | 2 | 1 | 0 | 1 | 4 | 3 | 0 | 1 | 75.00 | 1898–99 | 1898–99 | |
| Bristol City † | 26 | 20 | 3 | 3 | 25 | 5 | 4 | 16 | | 25 | 6 | 19 | 49.02 | 1897–98 | 2025–26 | |
| Bristol Rovers | 34 | 26 | 2 | 6 | 34 | 7 | 8 | 19 | 68 | 33 | 10 | 25 | 48.53 | 1899–1900 | 2010–11 | |
| Burnley | 30 | 14 | 12 | 4 | 30 | 6 | 6 | 18 | 60 | 20 | 18 | 22 | 33.33 | 1930–31 | 2021–22 | |
| Bury | 26 | 17 | 4 | 5 | 26 | 4 | 6 | 16 | 52 | 21 | 10 | 21 | 40.38 | 1922–23 | 1965–66 | |
| Cardiff City | 27 | 14 | 9 | 4 | 27 | 6 | 5 | 16 | 54 | 20 | 14 | 20 | 37.04 | 1912–13 | 2023–24 | |
| Carlisle United | 5 | 3 | 1 | 1 | 5 | 1 | 1 | 3 | 10 | 4 | 2 | 4 | 40.00 | 1965–66 | 2010–11 | |
| Charlton Athletic † | 30 | 18 | 6 | 6 | 30 | 8 | 11 | 11 | 60 | 26 | 17 | 17 | 43.33 | 1921–22 | 2025–26 | |
| Chatham ‡ | 7 | 5 | 0 | 2 | 7 | 3 | 2 | 2 | 14 | 8 | 2 | 4 | 57.14 | 1894–95 | 1899–1900 | |
| Chelsea | 50 | 14 | 13 | 23 | 50 | 13 | 14 | 23 | 100 | 27 | 27 | 46 | 27.00 | 1924–25 | 2024–25 | |
| Chesterfield | 12 | 6 | 4 | 2 | 12 | 2 | 2 | 8 | 24 | 8 | 6 | 10 | 33.33 | 1931–32 | 1959–60 | |
| Clapton | 2 | 2 | 0 | 0 | 2 | 1 | 0 | 1 | 4 | 3 | 0 | 1 | 75.00 | 1894–95 | 1895–96 | |
| Colchester United | 11 | 6 | 3 | 2 | 11 | 4 | 2 | 5 | 22 | 10 | 5 | 7 | 45.45 | 1953–54 | 2010–11 | |
| Coventry City † | 63 | 34 | 21 | 8 | 63 | 8 | 20 | 35 | 126 | 42 | 41 | 43 | 33.33 | 1908–09 | 2025–26 | |
| Crewe Alexandra | 1 | 1 | 0 | 0 | 1 | 0 | 1 | 0 | 2 | 1 | 1 | 0 | 50.00 | 2005–06 | 2005–06 | |
| Croydon Common ‡ | 4 | 2 | 0 | 2 | 4 | 1 | 0 | 3 | 8 | 3 | 0 | 5 | 37.50 | 1909–10 | 1914–15 | |
| Crystal Palace | 51 | 26 | 13 | 12 | 51 | 17 | 11 | 23 | 102 | 43 | 24 | 35 | 42.16 | 1906–07 | 2024–25 | |
| Dagenham and Redbridge | 1 | 1 | 0 | 0 | 1 | 1 | 0 | 0 | 2 | 2 | 0 | 0 | 100.00 | 2010–11 | 2010–11 | |
| Darlington | 2 | 2 | 0 | 0 | 2 | 1 | 0 | 1 | 4 | 3 | 0 | 1 | 75.00 | 1925–26 | 1926–27 | |
| Derby County † | 34 | 16 | 9 | 9 | 33 | 5 | 13 | 15 | 67 | 21 | 22 | 24 | 31.34 | 1922–23 | 2025–26 | |
| Doncaster Rovers | 9 | 5 | 3 | 1 | 9 | 3 | 2 | 4 | 18 | 8 | 5 | 5 | 44.44 | 1935–36 | 2011–12 | |
| Everton | 50 | 25 | 11 | 14 | 50 | 6 | 10 | 34 | 100 | 31 | 21 | 48 | 31.00 | 1930–31 | 2024–25 | |
| Exeter City | 17 | 13 | 3 | 1 | 17 | 5 | 5 | 7 | 34 | 18 | 8 | 8 | 52.94 | 1908–09 | 2010–11 | |
| Fulham | 39 | 26 | 8 | 5 | 39 | 5 | 17 | 17 | 78 | 31 | 25 | 22 | 39.74 | 1903–04 | 2024–25 | |
| Gillingham | 29 | 20 | 7 | 2 | 29 | 11 | 5 | 13 | 58 | 31 | 12 | 15 | 53.45 | 1895–96 | 1957–58 | (Note: Gillingham statistics include matches played against the club under their former name of New Brompton.) |
| Gravesend and Northfleet | 5 | 5 | 0 | 0 | 5 | 3 | 2 | 0 | 10 | 8 | 2 | 0 | 80.00 | 1896–97 | 1900–01 | |
| Grimsby Town | 12 | 7 | 3 | 2 | 12 | 2 | 4 | 6 | 24 | 9 | 7 | 8 | 37.50 | 1920–21 | 1963–64 | |
| Halifax Town | 2 | 2 | 0 | 0 | 2 | 0 | 0 | 2 | 4 | 2 | 0 | 2 | 50.00 | 1958–59 | 1959–60 | |
| Hartlepool United | 2 | 2 | 0 | 0 | 2 | 1 | 1 | 0 | 4 | 3 | 1 | 0 | 75.00 | 2009–10 | 2010–11 | |
| Hereford United | 1 | 1 | 0 | 0 | 1 | 0 | 0 | 1 | 2 | 1 | 0 | 1 | 50.00 | 1976–77 | 1976–77 | |
| Huddersfield Town | 14 | 7 | 4 | 3 | 14 | 4 | 2 | 8 | 28 | 11 | 6 | 11 | 39.29 | 1952–53 | 2023–24 | |
| Hull City † | 29 | 15 | 9 | 5 | 29 | 8 | 10 | 11 | 58 | 23 | 19 | 16 | 39.66 | 1922–23 | 2025–26 | |
| Ilford | 2 | 2 | 0 | 0 | 2 | 2 | 0 | 0 | 4 | 4 | 0 | 0 | 100.00 | 1894–95 | 1895–96 | |
| Ipswich Town † | 33 | 10 | 13 | 10 | 33 | 8 | 9 | 16 | 66 | 18 | 22 | 26 | 27.27 | 1953–54 | 2025–26 | |
| Kettering Town | 6 | 5 | 1 | 0 | 6 | 2 | 1 | 3 | 12 | 7 | 2 | 3 | 58.33 | 1897–98 | 1903–04 | |
| Leeds United | 48 | 20 | 8 | 20 | 48 | 8 | 13 | 27 | 97 | 29 | 21 | 47 | 29.90 | 1922–23 | 2023–24 | |
| Leicester City † | 47 | 23 | 16 | 8 | 47 | 12 | 13 | 22 | 94 | 35 | 29 | 30 | 37.23 | 1922–23 | 2025–26 | |
| Leyton ‡ | 6 | 5 | 1 | 0 | 6 | 2 | 2 | 2 | 12 | 7 | 3 | 2 | 58.33 | 1907–08 | 1911–12 | |
| Leyton Orient | 18 | 10 | 4 | 4 | 18 | 3 | 6 | 9 | 36 | 13 | 10 | 13 | 36.11 | 1906–07 | 2010–11 | (Note: Leyton Orient statistics include matches played against the club under their former name of Clapton Orient.) |
| Lincoln City | 5 | 4 | 0 | 1 | 6 | 2 | 3 | 1 | 11 | 6 | 3 | 2 | 54.55 | 1932–33 | 1960–61 | |
| Liverpool | 49 | 20 | 11 | 18 | 49 | 5 | 11 | 33 | 98 | 25 | 22 | 51 | 25.51 | 1960–61 | 2024–25 | |
| Loughborough Town ‡ | 1 | 1 | 0 | 0 | 1 | 0 | 1 | 0 | 2 | 1 | 1 | 0 | 50.00 | 1897–98 | 1897–98 | |
| Luton Town | 49 | 28 | 10 | 11 | 49 | 16 | 10 | 23 | 98 | 44 | 20 | 34 | 44.90 | 1894–95 | 2006–07 | |
| Manchester City | 46 | 18 | 13 | 15 | 46 | 10 | 13 | 23 | 92 | 28 | 26 | 38 | 30.43 | 1926–27 | 2024–25 | |
| Manchester United | 57 | 16 | 18 | 23 | 57 | 9 | 13 | 35 | 114 | 25 | 31 | 58 | 21.93 | 1922–23 | 2024–25 | |
| Mansfield Town | 3 | 3 | 0 | 0 | 3 | 2 | 0 | 1 | 6 | 5 | 0 | 1 | 83.33 | 1958–59 | 1977–78 | |
| Merthyr Town | 5 | 4 | 1 | 0 | 5 | 2 | 3 | 0 | 10 | 6 | 4 | 0 | 60.00 | 1912–13 | 1921–22 | |
| Middlesbrough † | 29 | 14 | 10 | 5 | 29 | 9 | 7 | 13 | 58 | 23 | 17 | 18 | 39.66 | 1924–25 | 2025–26 | |
| Millwall † | 60 | 37 | 12 | 11 | 59 | 17 | 14 | 28 | 119 | 54 | 26 | 39 | 45.38 | 1894–95 | 2025–26 | (Note: Millwall statistics include matches played against the club under their former name of Millwall Athletic.) |
| Milton Keynes Dons | 2 | 2 | 0 | 0 | 2 | 1 | 0 | 1 | 4 | 3 | 0 | 1 | 75.00 | 2009–10 | 2010–11 | (Note: Wimbledon relocated to Milton Keynes in 2003 and were rebranded as Milton Keynes Dons a year later. That club renounced all claims to Wimbledon's history in 2007, and have since regarded themselves as a new club founded in 2004.) |
| Nelson | 1 | 1 | 0 | 0 | 1 | 0 | 1 | 0 | 2 | 1 | 1 | 0 | 50.00 | 1923–24 | 1923–24 | |
| Newcastle United | 47 | 26 | 13 | 8 | 47 | 5 | 8 | 34 | 94 | 31 | 21 | 42 | 32.98 | 1934–35 | 2024–25 | |
| Newport County | 12 | 9 | 3 | 0 | 12 | 5 | 3 | 4 | 24 | 14 | 6 | 4 | 58.33 | 1913–14 | 1959–60 | |
| Northampton Town | 24 | 17 | 2 | 5 | 24 | 8 | 4 | 12 | 48 | 25 | 6 | 17 | 52.08 | 1901–02 | 1964–65 | |
| Northfleet ‡ | 2 | 2 | 0 | 0 | 2 | 2 | 0 | 0 | 4 | 4 | 0 | 0 | 100.00 | 1896–97 | 1897–98 | |
| Norwich City † | 62 | 35 | 21 | 6 | 63 | 14 | 17 | 32 | 125 | 49 | 38 | 38 | 39.20 | 1905–06 | 2025–26 | |
| Nottingham Forest | 51 | 24 | 12 | 15 | 51 | 11 | 9 | 31 | 102 | 35 | 21 | 46 | 34.31 | 1925–26 | 2024–25 | |
| Notts County | 22 | 15 | 5 | 2 | 22 | 10 | 6 | 6 | 44 | 25 | 11 | 8 | 56.82 | 1922–23 | 1991–92 | |
| Oldham Athletic | 21 | 13 | 5 | 3 | 21 | 4 | 6 | 11 | 42 | 17 | 11 | 14 | 40.48 | 1923–24 | 2010–11 | |
| Oxford United † | 6 | 5 | 1 | 0 | 6 | 2 | 1 | 3 | 12 | 7 | 2 | 3 | 58.33 | 1974–75 | 2025–26 | |
| Peterborough United | 2 | 2 | 0 | 0 | 2 | 1 | 1 | 0 | 4 | 3 | 1 | 0 | 75.00 | 2010–11 | 2011–12 | |
| Plymouth Argyle | 52 | 24 | 13 | 15 | 52 | 11 | 14 | 27 | 104 | 35 | 27 | 42 | 33.65 | 1903–04 | 2023–24 | |
| Port Vale | 15 | 5 | 4 | 6 | 15 | 3 | 5 | 7 | 30 | 8 | 9 | 13 | 26.67 | 1922–23 | 1958–59 | |
| Portsmouth † | 46 | 23 | 9 | 14 | 45 | 17 | 9 | 19 | 91 | 40 | 18 | 33 | 43.96 | 1899–1900 | 2025–26 | |
| Preston North End † | 22 | 10 | 7 | 5 | 23 | 5 | 7 | 11 | 45 | 15 | 14 | 16 | 33.33 | 1925–26 | 2025–26 | |
| Queens Park Rangers † | 63 | 34 | 13 | 16 | 62 | 24 | 13 | 25 | 125 | 58 | 26 | 41 | 46.40 | 1899–1900 | 2025–26 | |
| Reading | 47 | 21 | 14 | 12 | 47 | 17 | 13 | 17 | 94 | 38 | 27 | 29 | 40.43 | 1894–95 | 2012–13 | |
| Rochdale | 2 | 1 | 0 | 1 | 2 | 0 | 0 | 2 | 4 | 1 | 0 | 3 | 25.00 | 1958–59 | 1958–59 | |
| Rotherham County ‡ | 1 | 1 | 0 | 0 | 1 | 0 | 1 | 0 | 2 | 1 | 1 | 0 | 50.00 | 1922–23 | 1922–23 | |
| Rotherham United | 9 | 6 | 2 | 1 | 9 | 3 | 1 | 5 | 18 | 9 | 3 | 6 | 50.00 | 1951–52 | 2023–24 | |
| Royal Artillery ‡ | 1 | 1 | 0 | 0 | 1 | 0 | 1 | 0 | 2 | 1 | 1 | 0 | 50.00 | 1898–99 | 1898–99 | |
| Royal Ordnance ‡ | 2 | 2 | 0 | 0 | 2 | 1 | 0 | 1 | 4 | 3 | 0 | 1 | 75.00 | 1894–95 | 1895–96 | |
| Rushden ‡ | 2 | 2 | 0 | 0 | 2 | 0 | 0 | 2 | 4 | 2 | 0 | 2 | 50.00 | 1897–98 | 1898–99 | |
| Scunthorpe United | 5 | 4 | 1 | 0 | 5 | 1 | 1 | 3 | 10 | 5 | 2 | 3 | 50.00 | 1960–61 | 2007–08 | |
| Sheffield United † | 27 | 13 | 7 | 7 | 27 | 7 | 5 | 15 | 54 | 20 | 12 | 22 | 37.04 | 1934–35 | 2025–26 | |
| Sheffield Wednesday † | 38 | 18 | 9 | 11 | 38 | 8 | 12 | 18 | 76 | 26 | 21 | 29 | 34.21 | 1922–23 | 2025–26 | (Note: Sheffield Wednesday statistics include matches played against the club under their former name of The Wednesday.) |
| Sheppey United | 4 | 4 | 0 | 0 | 4 | 3 | 0 | 1 | 8 | 7 | 0 | 1 | 87.50 | 1896–97 | 1899–1900 | |
| Shrewsbury Town | 6 | 4 | 2 | 0 | 6 | 1 | 2 | 3 | 12 | 5 | 4 | 3 | 41.67 | 1953–54 | 1959–60 | |
| South Shields ‡ | 6 | 1 | 2 | 3 | 6 | 2 | 2 | 2 | 12 | 3 | 4 | 5 | 25.00 | 1922–23 | 1927–28 | |
| Southend United | 19 | 12 | 4 | 3 | 19 | 6 | 4 | 9 | 38 | 18 | 8 | 12 | 47.37 | 1908–09 | 2009–10 | |
| Stockport County | 7 | 6 | 1 | 0 | 7 | 2 | 3 | 2 | 14 | 8 | 4 | 2 | 57.14 | 1922–23 | 2009–10 | |
| Stoke City † | 41 | 24 | 6 | 11 | 40 | 11 | 9 | 20 | 81 | 35 | 15 | 31 | 43.21 | 1911–12 | 2025–26 | (Note: Stoke City statistics include matches played against the club under their former name of Stoke.) |
| Sunderland | 29 | 17 | 7 | 5 | 29 | 8 | 8 | 13 | 58 | 25 | 15 | 18 | 43.10 | 1960–61 | 2023–24 | |
| Swansea City † | 39 | 26 | 7 | 6 | 38 | 13 | 10 | 15 | 77 | 39 | 17 | 21 | 50.65 | 1919–20 | 2025–26 | |
| Swindon Town | 38 | 25 | 5 | 8 | 38 | 14 | 7 | 17 | 76 | 39 | 12 | 25 | 51.32 | 1894–95 | 2010–11 | |
| Torquay United | 5 | 3 | 2 | 0 | 5 | 0 | 3 | 2 | 10 | 3 | 5 | 2 | 30.00 | 1953–54 | 1957–58 | |
| Tottenham Hotspur | 83 | 38 | 27 | 18 | 83 | 14 | 14 | 55 | 166 | 52 | 41 | 73 | 31.33 | 1896–97 | 2024–25 | |
| Tranmere Rovers | 5 | 3 | 1 | 1 | 5 | 1 | 1 | 3 | 10 | 4 | 2 | 4 | 40.00 | 1938–39 | 2010–11 | |
| Walsall | 9 | 7 | 2 | 0 | 9 | 3 | 4 | 2 | 18 | 10 | 6 | 2 | 55.56 | 1953–54 | 2010–11 | |
| Watford † | 41 | 26 | 6 | 9 | 42 | 9 | 17 | 16 | 83 | 35 | 23 | 25 | 42.17 | 1900–01 | 2025–26 | |
| Wellingborough | 6 | 5 | 0 | 1 | 6 | 4 | 1 | 1 | 12 | 9 | 1 | 2 | 75.00 | 1897–98 | 1904–05 | |
| West Bromwich Albion † | 39 | 22 | 13 | 4 | 40 | 9 | 11 | 20 | 79 | 31 | 24 | 24 | 39.24 | 1927–28 | 2025–26 | |
| West Ham United | 76 | 34 | 24 | 18 | 77 | 14 | 18 | 45 | 153 | 48 | 42 | 63 | 31.37 | 1899–1900 | 2024–25 | |
| Wigan Athletic | 1 | 0 | 0 | 1 | 1 | 0 | 1 | 0 | 2 | 0 | 1 | 1 | 0.00 | 2012–13 | 2012–13 | |
| Wimbledon ‡ | 14 | 4 | 8 | 2 | 14 | 5 | 4 | 5 | 28 | 9 | 12 | 7 | 32.14 | 1986–87 | 1999–2000 | |
| Wolverhampton Wanderers | 34 | 18 | 5 | 11 | 34 | 6 | 12 | 16 | 68 | 24 | 17 | 27 | 35.29 | 1922–23 | 2024–25 | |
| Wolverton ‡ | 2 | 2 | 0 | 0 | 2 | 2 | 0 | 0 | 4 | 4 | 0 | 0 | 100.00 | 1896–97 | 1897–98 | |
| Wrexham † | 3 | 2 | 0 | 1 | 4 | 2 | 0 | 2 | 7 | 4 | 0 | 3 | 57.14 | 1958–59 | 2025–26 | |
| Wycombe Wanderers | 1 | 1 | 0 | 0 | 1 | 0 | 1 | 0 | 2 | 1 | 1 | 0 | 50.00 | 2009–10 | 2009–10 | |
| Yeovil Town | 2 | 2 | 0 | 0 | 2 | 1 | 1 | 0 | 4 | 3 | 1 | 0 | 75.00 | 2009–10 | 2010–11 | |
| York City | 3 | 3 | 0 | 0 | 3 | 0 | 2 | 1 | 6 | 3 | 2 | 1 | 50.00 | 1959–60 | 1975–76 | |
