= Crystal Palace F.C. league record by opponent =

The Crystal Palace team of the 1905–06 season.

Crystal Palace Football Club is a professional association football club based in Selhurst, South London, England. Founded in 1905, the club first played in the Southern League, and competed in this league for eleven seasons before being elected to play in the Football League in 1920 as members of the Third Division. Palace won the Third Division in their first season immediately gaining promotion to the Second Division. The team achieved their highest league placing in the 1990–91 season when they finished in 3rd place of the First Division. In 1992 the 22 teams in the First Division broke away from the Football League to form the Premier League, Palace were relegated from the inaugural season in 20th place, level on points with 19th place Oldham Athletic but with an inferior goal difference. The team would rejoin the Premier League and be relegated after one season in 1994, 1997 and 2004. They won the 2013 Football League Championship play-off final to once again be promoted into the Premier League where they currently compete.

Crystal Palace's first team have competed in a number of nationally contested leagues, and their record against each club faced in those competitions is summarised below. Palace's first league match was contested with Southampton reserves in the opening match of the 1905–06 Southern Football League Division Two, with their first Football League match coming against Merthyr Town. They met their 115th and most recent different league opponent, Scunthorpe United, for the first time in the 2007–08 Football League Championship. The teams that Palace have played most in league competition are Norwich City and Watford, having played them 130 times. Palace have recorded more victories against Norwich City than any other club, with 57 victories. Norwich are also the side Palace have lost the most league games to, having been beaten by them 50 times. Brighton & Hove Albion and Coventry City have each drawn 35 of their encounters with Palace, more than any other club.

== Key ==
- The table includes results of matches played by Crystal Palace in the Southern Football League, the Football League and the Premier League. Matches from the abandoned 1939–40 Football League season are excluded, as are play-offs and matches in the various wartime competitions.
- The name used for each opponent is the name they had when Crystal Palace most recently played a league match against them. Results against each opponent include results against that club under any former name. For example, results against Gillingham include matches played against New Brompton.
- The columns headed "First" and "Last" contain the first and most recent seasons in which Crystal Palace played league matches against each opponent.
- Pld = matches played; W = matches won; D = matches drawn; L = matches lost; Win % = percentage of total matches won
- † Clubs with this background and symbol in the "Opponent" column are Crystal Palace's divisional rivals in the current season, the 2023–24 Premier League.
- ‡ Clubs with this background and symbol in the "Opponent" column are defunct. Reserve teams that Crystal Palace played in the Southern Football League are classed as defunct because they no longer compete in the English football league system.

== All-time league record ==
Statistics are correct up to and including the match played against Chelsea on 1 September 2024.

Crystal Palace F.C. league record by opponent
Club	Home				Away				Total						Win%	First	Last	Note(s)
Club	Pld	W	D	L	Pld	W	D	L	Pld	W	D	L	GF	GA	Win%	First	Last	Note(s)
Aberdare Athletic ‡	2	0	1	1	2	1	0	1	4	1	1	2	3	5	25.00	1925–26	1926–27	
Accrington Stanley ‡	1	1	0	0	1	1	0	0	2	2	0	0	12	4	100.00	1960–61	1960–61	(Note: This Accrington Stanley was the one that existed between 1891 and 1966. The Accrington Stanley F.C. founded in 1968 is a different club.)
Aldershot ‡	24	16	6	2	24	6	4	14	48	22	10	16	69	56	45.83	1932–33	1975–76	
Arsenal †	24	3	8	13	24	2	6	16	48	5	14	29	47	101	10.42	1969–70	2023–24	
Aston Villa †	21	11	6	4	21	3	5	13	42	14	11	17	41	47	33.33	1967–68	2023–24	
Barnsley	30	14	5	11	30	8	7	15	60	22	12	26	73	78	36.67	1921–22	2012–13	
Barrow	3	2	1	0	3	2	0	1	6	4	1	1	19	5	66.67	1958–59	1960–61	
Birmingham City	22	11	5	6	22	5	3	14	44	16	8	20	55	55	36.36	1965–66	2012–13	
Blackburn Rovers	21	12	4	5	21	5	5	11	42	17	9	16	58	52	40.48	1966–67	2012–13	
Blackpool	14	5	5	4	14	2	3	9	28	7	8	13	33	43	25.00	1921–22	2012–13	
Bolton Wanderers	18	7	8	3	18	1	7	10	36	8	15	13	36	51	22.22	1964–65	2012–13	
Bournemouth †	39	22	9	8	39	6	10	23	78	28	19	31	112	119	35.90	1932–33	2023–24	(Note: Bournemouth statistics include matches played against the club under its former name of Bournemouth & Boscombe Athletic.)
Bradford City	12	8	3	1	12	6	2	4	24	14	5	5	37	18	58.33	1922–23	2003–04	
Bradford (Park Avenue)	7	4	3	0	7	1	1	5	14	5	4	5	19	18	35.71	1907–08	1962–63	
Brentford †	26	16	6	4	27	4	7	16	53	20	13	20	74	78	37.74	1906–07	2024–25	
Brighton & Hove Albion †	61	28	21	12	61	14	14	33	122	42	35	45	163	162	34.43	1906–07	2023–24	
Bristol City	37	24	7	6	37	5	14	18	74	29	21	24	105	100	39.19	1921–22	2012–13	
Bristol Rovers	36	27	4	5	36	8	12	16	72	35	16	21	124	97	48.61	1906–07	1978–79	
Burnley	24	9	8	7	24	6	7	11	48	15	15	18	60	56	31.25	1969–70	2023–24	
Bury	11	8	2	1	11	3	5	3	22	11	7	4	33	24	50.00	1921–22	1998–99	
Cambridge United	4	1	3	0	4	1	2	1	8	2	5	1	7	5	25.00	1978–79	1983–84	
Cardiff City	35	20	8	7	35	12	12	11	70	32	20	18	106	76	45.71	1913–14	2018–19	
Carlisle United	13	7	3	3	13	1	5	7	26	8	8	10	39	42	30.77	1958–59	1985–86	
Charlton Athletic	28	19	4	5	28	7	9	12	56	26	13	17	78	55	46.43	1925–26	2012–13	
Chelsea †	27	5	6	16	28	3	9	16	55	8	15	32	45	94	14.55	1924–25	2024–25	
Chester ‡	5	2	1	2	5	1	0	4	10	3	1	6	19	20	30.00	1958–59	1976–77	(Note: Chester were renamed Chester City in 1983 and dissolved in 2010. The Chester F.C. founded in 2010 is a different club.)
Chesterfield	3	0	2	1	3	2	0	1	6	2	2	2	6	7	33.33	1974–75	1976–77	
Colchester United	14	4	5	5	14	6	4	4	28	10	9	9	40	42	35.71	1950–51	2007–08	
Coventry City	55	20	19	16	55	15	16	24	110	35	35	40	149	168	31.82	1908–09	2012–13	
Crewe Alexandra	10	5	4	1	10	4	4	2	20	9	8	3	34	23	45.00	1958–59	2005–06	
Croydon Common ‡	2	1	0	1	2	1	1	0	4	2	1	1	5	6	50.00	1909–10	1914–15	
Darlington	3	3	0	0	3	2	1	0	6	5	1	0	15	5	83.33	1958–59	1960–61	
Derby County	32	14	10	8	32	6	6	20	64	20	16	28	69	93	31.25	1921–22	2012–13	
Doncaster Rovers	6	4	1	1	6	2	2	2	12	6	3	3	21	12	50.00	1959–60	2011–12	
Everton †	24	7	9	8	24	4	8	12	48	11	17	20	48	74	22.92	1969–70	2023–24	
Exeter City	38	19	14	5	38	10	11	17	76	29	25	22	118	121	38.16	1908–09	1957–58	
Fulham †	25	8	9	8	25	5	9	11	50	13	18	19	60	73	26.00	1906–07	2023–24	
Fulham reserves ‡	1	1	0	0	1	0	1	0	2	1	1	0	7	2	50.00	1905–06	1905–06	
Gateshead ‡	6	2	3	1	6	2	2	2	12	4	5	3	15	13	33.33	1921–22	1959–60	(Note: Gateshead statistics include matches played against the club under its former name of South Shields.)
Gillingham	42	22	10	10	42	10	11	21	84	32	21	31	110	93	38.10	1906–07	2003–04	(Note: Gillingham statistics include matches played against the club under its former name of New Brompton.)
Grays United ‡	1	1	0	0	1	1	0	0	2	2	0	0	12	1	100.00	1905–06	1905–06	
Grimsby Town	19	14	0	5	19	7	3	9	38	21	3	14	62	42	55.26	1920–21	2002–03	
Halifax Town ‡	4	1	3	0	4	1	2	1	8	2	5	1	13	12	25.00	1961–62	1975–76	
Hartlepool United	3	1	1	1	3	2	0	1	6	3	1	2	14	12	50.00	1958–59	1960–61	
Hereford United ‡	2	0	2	0	2	0	1	1	4	0	3	1	5	7	0.00	1974–75	1975–76	
Huddersfield Town	21	6	11	4	21	8	6	7	42	14	17	11	43	50	33.33	1964–65	2017–18	
Hull City	25	9	9	7	25	6	9	10	50	15	18	17	59	66	30.00	1921–22	2016–17	
Ipswich Town †	40	15	15	10	40	11	9	20	80	26	24	30	121	125	32.50	1938–39	2012–13	
Leeds United	29	12	12	5	29	6	4	19	58	18	16	24	63	73	31.03	1921–22	2022–23	
Leicester City †	33	16	7	10	33	7	11	15	66	23	18	25	82	86	34.85	1921–22	2022–23	
Leyton ‡	7	4	2	1	7	5	1	1	14	9	3	2	27	12	64.29	1905–06	1911–12	
Leyton Orient	30	18	9	3	30	7	8	15	60	25	17	18	73	74	41.67	1921–22	1981–82	(Note: Leyton Orient statistics include matches played against the club under its former name of Clapton Orient.)
Lincoln City	2	1	0	1	2	0	0	2	4	1	0	3	9	10	25.00	1961–62	1976–77	
Liverpool †	24	5	6	13	24	5	3	16	48	10	9	29	43	106	20.83	1969–70	2023–24	
Luton Town	34	19	9	6	34	8	8	18	68	27	17	24	119	112	39.71	1906–07	2023–24	
Manchester City †	32	8	8	16	32	7	8	17	64	15	16	33	63	107	23.44	1964–65	2023–24	
Manchester United †	27	6	8	13	27	5	3	19	54	11	11	32	50	91	20.37	1922–23	2023–24	
Mansfield Town	9	8	1	0	9	2	4	3	18	10	5	3	38	19	55.56	1931–32	1977–78	
Merthyr Town	9	7	2	0	9	3	3	3	18	10	5	3	35	22	55.56	1912–13	1929–30	
Middlesbrough	21	12	3	6	21	5	7	9	42	17	10	15	56	51	40.48	1924–25	2016–17	
Millwall	53	24	15	14	53	14	14	25	106	38	29	39	134	137	35.85	1906–07	2012–13	
Nelson	1	0	1	0	1	0	0	1	2	0	1	1	3	5	0.00	1923–24	1923–24	
Newcastle United †	23	8	6	9	23	4	5	14	46	12	11	23	36	57	26.09	1964–65	2023–24	
Newport County	27	19	7	1	27	11	6	10	54	30	13	11	109	56	55.56	1919–20	1961–62	
Northampton Town	45	17	14	14	45	4	14	27	90	21	28	41	116	158	23.33	1906–07	1976–77	
Norwich City	65	42	10	13	65	15	13	37	130	57	23	50	196	165	43.85	1906–07	2021–22	
Nottingham Forest †	27	7	12	8	27	6	5	16	54	13	17	24	53	81	24.07	1921–22	2023–24	
Notts County	21	10	5	6	21	8	6	7	42	18	11	13	58	54	42.86	1921–22	1993–94	
Oldham Athletic	20	13	4	3	20	4	4	12	40	17	8	15	58	51	42.50	1923–24	1996–97	
Oxford United	8	5	3	0	8	5	1	2	16	10	4	2	27	16	62.50	1968–69	1998–99	
Peterborough United	11	6	3	2	11	1	6	4	22	7	9	6	26	29	31.82	1960–61	2012–13	
Plymouth Argyle	33	16	7	10	33	9	8	16	66	25	15	26	89	101	37.88	1906–07	2009–10	
Port Vale	23	8	10	5	23	6	4	13	46	14	14	18	50	67	30.43	1921–22	1999–2000	
Portsmouth	35	21	6	8	35	5	12	18	70	26	18	26	103	88	37.14	1906–07	2011–12	
Portsmouth reserves ‡	1	1	0	0	1	0	1	0	2	1	1	0	2	1	50.00	1905–06	1905–06	
Preston North End	20	14	4	2	20	3	7	10	40	17	11	12	44	38	42.50	1964–65	2010–11	
Queens Park Rangers	55	22	18	15	55	17	12	26	110	39	30	41	112	123	35.45	1906–07	2014–15	
Reading	46	18	17	11	46	10	12	24	92	28	29	35	133	154	30.43	1906–07	2011–12	
Reading reserves ‡	1	1	0	0	1	1	0	0	2	2	0	0	4	0	100.00	1905–06	1905–06	
Rochdale	2	2	0	0	2	0	1	1	4	2	1	1	10	7	50.00	1959–60	1960–61	
Rotherham County ‡	2	2	0	0	2	0	1	1	4	2	1	1	8	5	50.00	1921–22	1922–23	
Rotherham United	11	6	5	0	11	5	2	4	22	11	7	4	33	25	50.00	1964–65	2003–04	
Scunthorpe United	3	1	0	2	3	1	1	1	6	2	1	3	5	10	33.33	2007–08	2010–11	
Sheffield United	28	13	6	9	28	11	6	11	56	24	12	20	68	58	42.86	1968–69	2023–24	
Sheffield Wednesday	25	12	9	4	25	3	6	16	50	15	15	20	58	64	30.00	1921–22	2012–13	(Note: Sheffield Wednesday statistics include matches played against the club under its former name of The Wednesday.)
Shrewsbury Town	21	7	7	7	21	3	10	8	42	10	17	15	57	58	23.81	1951–52	1988–89	
Southampton †	50	22	11	17	50	12	12	26	100	34	23	43	135	148	34.00	1906–07	2022–23	
Southampton reserves ‡	1	0	0	1	1	1	0	0	2	1	0	1	5	4	50.00	1905–06	1905–06	
Southend United	42	23	12	7	42	12	10	20	84	35	22	27	144	131	41.67	1908–09	2006–07	
Southern United ‡	1	1	0	0	1	1	0	0	2	2	0	0	5	0	100.00	1905–06	1905–06	
Southport	3	2	1	0	3	1	1	1	6	3	2	1	14	8	50.00	1958–59	1960–61	
St Leonards United ‡	1	1	0	0	1	1	0	0	2	2	0	0	6	1	100.00	1905–06	1905–06	
Stockport County	9	5	4	0	9	4	3	2	18	9	7	2	35	23	50.00	1922–23	2001–02	
Stoke City	30	18	4	8	30	10	9	11	60	28	13	19	85	67	46.67	1911–12	2017–18	(Note: Stoke City statistics include matches played against the club under its former name of Stoke.)
Sunderland	18	10	3	5	18	3	8	7	36	13	11	12	39	34	36.11	1969–70	2016–17	
Swansea City	14	5	3	6	14	2	6	6	28	7	9	12	29	37	25.00	1919–20	2017–18	(Note: Swansea City statistics include matches played against the club under its former name of Swansea Town.)
Swindon Town	49	28	12	9	49	9	15	25	98	37	27	34	164	142	37.76	1906–07	1999–2000	
Swindon Town reserves ‡	1	1	0	0	1	1	0	0	2	2	0	0	5	1	100.00	1905–06	1905–06	
Thames ‡	2	2	0	0	2	2	0	0	4	4	0	0	9	3	100.00	1930–31	1931–32	
Torquay United	27	16	8	3	27	6	7	14	54	22	15	17	105	82	40.74	1927–28	1961–62	
Tottenham Hotspur †	27	4	6	17	27	4	7	16	54	8	13	33	41	89	14.81	1906–07	2023–24	
Tranmere Rovers	8	4	3	1	8	4	1	3	16	8	4	4	22	19	50.00	1974–75	2000–01	
Walsall	30	23	2	5	30	5	14	11	60	28	16	16	107	76	46.67	1927–28	2003–04	
Watford	65	37	11	17	65	18	17	30	130	55	28	47	202	174	42.31	1906–07	2021–22	
Watford reserves ‡	1	1	0	0	1	1	0	0	2	2	0	0	7	1	100.00	1905–06	1905–06	
West Bromwich Albion	28	11	8	9	28	8	7	13	56	19	15	22	72	69	33.93	1969–70	2020–21	
West Ham United †	33	9	12	12	32	9	13	10	65	18	25	22	89	107	27.69	1906–07	2024–25	
West Ham United reserves ‡	1	1	0	0	1	0	1	0	2	1	1	0	3	1	50.00	1905–06	1905–06	
Wigan Athletic	1	0	1	0	1	0	0	1	2	0	1	1	1	6	0.00	2003–04	2003–04	
Wimbledon ‡	12	7	1	4	12	4	4	4	24	11	5	8	37	35	45.83	1984–85	2003–04	(Note: Wimbledon relocated to Milton Keynes in 2003, and were rebranded as Milton Keynes Dons F.C. a year later. That club renounced all claims to Wimbledon's history in 2007, since then it has regarded itself as a new club founded in 2004.)
Wolverhampton Wanderers †	32	13	10	9	32	10	6	16	64	23	16	25	82	79	35.94	1921–22	2023–24	
Workington	3	1	1	1	3	1	1	1	6	2	2	2	10	6	33.33	1958–59	1960–61	
Wrexham	8	7	1	0	8	5	3	0	16	12	4	0	34	15	75.00	1960–61	1981–82	
Wycombe Wanderers	1	1	0	0	1	1	0	0	2	2	0	0	8	1	100.00	1905–06	1905–06	
York City	3	2	1	0	3	1	1	1	6	3	2	1	6	3	50.00	1958–59	1976–77	
