= George Badenoch =

Scottish footballer

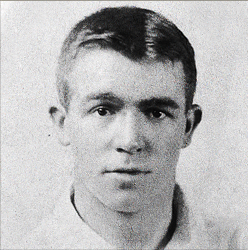

Personal information
- Full name: George Huntley Badenoch
- Date of birth: 9 April 1882
- Place of birth: Castle Douglas, Scotland
- Date of death: 15 June 1915 (aged 33)
- Place of death: Givenchy-lès-la-Bassée, France
- Height: 5 ft 8 in (1.73 m)
- Positions: Outside right; wing half

Senior career*
Years	Team	Apps	(Gls)
1899–1900	Douglas Wanderers		
1900–1901	Heart of Midlothian	0	(0)
1901–1903	Glossop	48	(4)
1903–1906	Watford	80	(9)
1906–1907	Tottenham Hotspur	1	(0)
1907–1909	Northampton Town	47	(1)
- Indian Head Thistle
- * Club domestic league appearances and goals

George Huntley Badenoch (9 April 1882 – 15 June 1915) was a Scottish professional footballer who played in the Football League for Glossop as an outside forward. He made over 125 appearances for Southern League clubs Watford, Northampton Town and Tottenham Hotspur.

== Personal life ==
Badenoch was an engineer by trade and served in the Galloway Rifle Volunteers prior to leaving Scotland for England in 1901. His football career ended due to a knee injury. Following a summer in Canada in 1908, Badenoch and his wife emigrated to the country in January 1910 and reunited with other members of the Badenoch family in Indian Head, Saskatchewan. There, he had two children and played for the local cricket club. Badenoch returned to Britain with his family in 1913 and the following year, after the outbreak of the First World War, he enlisted as a private in the 1st (Western Ontario) Battalion of the Canadian Expeditionary Force. At the time of his enlistment, he was working as a sales manager. Badenoch was posted to the Western Front with his regiment in February 1915 and saw action at St. Julien and Kitcheners' Wood. He was killed on 15 June 1915, during the Second Action of Givenchy and is commemorated on the Vimy Memorial.

== Career statistics ==
Appearances and goals by club, season and competition
Club	Season	League			FA Cup		Total	
Club	Season	Division	Apps	Goals	Apps	Goals	Apps	Goals
Watford	1903–04	Southern League Second Division	19	1	2	0	21	1
Watford	1904–05	Southern League First Division	28	7	4	1	32	8
Watford	1905–06	Southern League First Division	33	1	3	0	36	1
Watford	Total		80	9	9	1	89	10
Tottenham Hotspur	1906–07	Southern League First Division	1	0	0	0	1	0
Career total			81	9	9	1	90	10

== Honours ==
Watford

- Southern League Second Division: 1903–04

Northampton Town

- Southern League First Division: 1908–09
