= Robert Haywood =

Robert Haywood may refer to:

- Robert Haywood (cricketer, born 1887) (1887–1942), English cricketer
- Robert Haywood (cricketer, born 1858) (1858–1922), English cricketer
- Robert Haywood (Scottish cricketer) (1917–1963), English-born Scottish cricketer and British Army officer

== See also ==
- Robert Heywood (born 1994), English cricketer
- Robert Hayward (disambiguation)
