= Dave McCartney =

Scottish footballer

Personal information
- Full name: David Thompson McCartney
- Date of birth: 26 December 1875
- Place of birth: Cronberry, Scotland
- Date of death: 8 December 1949 (aged 73)
- Place of death: New South Wales, Australia
- Position: Centre half

Senior career*
Years	Team	Apps	(Gls)
1898–1899	Cronberry Eglinton		
1899–1900	Dalbeattie		
1900	Lugar Boswell		
1900–1903	Glossop	73	(5)
1903–1906	Watford	82	(13)
1906–1907	Chelsea	1	(0)
1907–1910	Northampton Town	106	(8)
Total		262	(26)
- * Club domestic league appearances and goals

David Thompson McCartney (26 December 1875 – 8 December 1949) was a Scottish professional footballer, best remembered for his time as a centre half in the Southern League with Northampton Town and Watford. He also played in the Football League for Glossop and Chelsea.

== Career statistics ==
Appearances and goals by club, season and competition
Club	Season	League			FA Cup		Total	
Club	Season	Division	Apps	Goals	Apps	Goals	Apps	Goals
Watford	1903–04	Southern League First Division	20	3	2	0	22	3
Watford	1904–05	Southern League First Division	31	5	5	1	36	6
Watford	1905–06	Southern League First Division	31	5	2	0	33	5
Watford	Total		82	13	9	1	91	14
Chelsea	1906–07	Second Division	1	0	2	0	3	0
Career total			83	13	11	1	94	13

== Honours ==
Northampton Town

- Southern League First Division: 1908–09

Watford

- Southern League Second Division: 1903–04
