= Albert Lewis (footballer) =

English footballer

Personal information
- Full name: Albert Lewis
- Date of birth: 1884
- Place of birth: Wolverhampton, England
- Position: Inside forward

Senior career*
Years	Team	Apps	(Gls)
1902–1904	Stafford Rangers		
1904–1906	West Bromwich Albion	29	(6)
1906–1908	Coventry City		
1908–1913	Northampton Town	164	(85)
1913–1914	West Bromwich Albion	19	(3)
1914	South Shields		
- * Club domestic league appearances and goals

Albert Lewis (c. 1884 – Unknown) was an English professional footballer who played as an inside-left in the English Football League and Southern League.

== Career ==
Born in 1884, in Wolverhampton, Lewis joined Stafford Rangers in 1902 and transferred to Second Division club West Bromwich Albion in June 1904. He made his Football League debut at Burnley in September 1904, scoring a hat-trick in a 4-1 win. He made 29 appearances for The Baggies, scoring 6 goals before joining Birmingham & District Junior League club Coventry City for £50 in June 1906 where he was described by the Coventry Evening Telegraph as the club's best player of the era.

He stayed for two seasons at Highfield Road before joining Northampton Town in 1908 under Herbert Chapman. It is said Chapman invited him into his office, locked the door, and hid the key, stating: "you won't get out of here until you have signed". He was part of the Southern League championship winning team of 1908–09 forming a successful partnership with Fred Lessons. He also played in the Charity Shield which Northampton lost 2-0 to Football League champions Newcastle United at Stamford Bridge in April 1909, and finished as runners-up in the League the following season. The day before the Titanic sank on April 15, 1912, Lewis scored against Bristol Rovers in a 5-0 win, with the other four goals scored by Walter Tull, who went onto become one of the first mixed-heritage infantry officers in the British Army. He scored 90 goals in 179 appearances and is still their 7th all-time record goalscorer. He also represented the Southern League XI against the Football League on April 11, 1910 at Stamford Bridge, scoring in a 2-2 draw.

Lewis re-joined West Bromwich Albion for £50 in May 1913, before joining North Eastern League club South Shields for £50 in March 1914.

After serving in the Army during World War I, he returned to football before retiring in May 1920.

== Honours ==
Northampton Town

- Southern League First Division: 1908–09
