= Stanley Allen =

Stanley Allen may refer to:

- H. Stanley Allen (1873–1954), English physicist
- Stan Allen (born 1956), American architect

== See also ==
- Stanley Allan (born 1886), English footballer
- Allen Stanley (1926–2013), Canadian ice hockey player
