= Robert Hayward =

Robert Hayward may refer to:

- Robert Hayward, Baron Hayward (born 1949), British Conservative politician
- Robert Baldwin Hayward (1829–1903), English educator and mathematician
- Bob Hayward (1927–1961), Canadian powerboat racer

== See also ==
- Robert Haywood (disambiguation)
