= William Ellis Bailiff =

Welsh footballer

Personal information
- Full name: William Ellis Bailiff
- Date of birth: 19 March 1882
- Place of birth: Ruabon, Wales
- Date of death: 12 April 1972 (aged 90)
- Place of death: Aberdare, Wales
- Height: 6 ft 1 in (1.85 m)
- Position: Goalkeeper

Senior career*
Years	Team	Apps	(Gls)
1906–1907	Ruabon		
1907–1908	Druids		
1908–1909	Northampton Town	2	(0)
1909–1910	Treharris		
1910–1911	Bristol City		
1911–1912	Treharris		
1912–1920	Llanelly		
1920–1921	Bargoed		

International career
1914–1920	Wales	4	(0)
- * Club domestic league appearances and goals

William Ellis Bailiff (19 March 1882 – 12 April 1972) was a Welsh professional footballer who played as a goalkeeper.

He started his playing career with Ruabon before moving on to Druids, Northampton Town, Bristol City, for whom he played in The Football League, and Llanelly. He received four international caps for Wales, the last of which came against Ireland in 1920.

== Club career ==
Born in Ruabon in north-east Wales, Bailiff began his career playing for the Town's football side. He joined Druids in 1907 before he and teammate Lloyd Davies joined Southern Football League side Northampton Town the following year. Although Davies enjoyed a long career with Northampton, Bailiff was unable to establish himself in the side, making only two league appearances before returning to Wales with Treharris.

In 1910, he joined Football League side Bristol City, but returned to Treharris after a year. He joined Llanelly in 1912 and spent the rest of the decade with the club, although his spell was interrupted by a work accident at the steelworks where he also worked and the First World War. He played in the 1914 Welsh Cup final for the club, which suffered a 3–0 defeat to Wrexham. He later played for Bargoed.

== International career ==
The goalkeeping position for Wales had been dominated by Leigh Richmond Roose at the start of the 20th century, but Roose's retirement gave opportunity to several players. Bailiff was chosen as the starting goalkeeper for the 1912–13 British Home Championship ahead of Bob Evans by two votes by the selectors from the Football Association of Wales. He played in all three matches against England, Scotland and Ireland. After keeping clean sheets against the latter two sides, he conceded four goals in a 4–3 defeat to England in Wales' final match. In 1920, he was recalled to the national side when Wolverhampton Wanderers refused to release Teddy Peers for a match against Ireland, winning his fourth and final cap.

== Later life ==
Bailiff retired from football at the age of 39 and went on to work as a platelayer for a railway company. He died in Aberdare in 1972.
