= Robert Davies (footballer, born 1863) =

Welsh footballer (1863–?)

Personal information
- Full name: Robert Davies
- Date of birth: 1863
- Place of birth: Cefn Mawr, Wales
- Date of death: First World War
- Place of death: France
- Position: Wing half

Senior career*
Years	Team	Apps	(Gls)
1883–1886	Druids		
- Ardwick
- Rossendale

International career
1885	Wales	1	(0)
- * Club domestic league appearances and goals

Robert Davies (born 1863) was a Welsh footballer who played as a wing half for Druids in the 1880s and made one appearance for Wales in 1885.

== Football career ==
Davies was born in Cefn Mawr, near Ruabon, and was the eldest of five brothers who played for Druids. Described as "a keen competitor and a tough tackler", he helped Druids reach the final of the Welsh Cup in 1884, losing 1–0 to Oswestry White Stars after a replay. The following year, the clubs met again in the final with Druids winning this time 3–1, again after a replay.

He made his solitary international appearance against England in 1885. The match was played at Leamington Road, Blackburn on 14 March and ended in a 1–1 draw, with the English performance described as "disappointing".

After leaving the Druids in 1886, Davies moved to Manchester where he briefly played for Ardwick and later Rossendale.

== Career outside football ==
Davies was killed in action during the First World War.

== Family ==
Three of his brothers also played for Wales: Joe (7 appearances), Lloyd (16 appearances) and Thomas (4 appearances).

== Honours ==
Druids

- Welsh Cup winners: 1885
- Welsh Cup finalists: 1884
