= Thomas Davies (footballer, born 1872) =

Welsh footballer

Personal information
- Full name: Thomas Davies
- Date of birth: 1872
- Place of birth: Cefn Mawr, Wales
- Date of death: 1950s (aged 77–87)
- Position: Half-back

Youth career
- Brookside Villa

Senior career*
Years	Team	Apps	(Gls)
1890–1910	Druids		

International career
1903–1904	Wales	4	(0)
- * Club domestic league appearances and goals

Thomas Davies (1872 – 1950s) was a Welsh amateur footballer who played at half back for Druids for twenty years around the turn of the twentieth century. He also made four appearances for the Welsh national team.

== Football career ==
Davies was one of five brothers from Cefn Mawr who played for the local Druids side, then one of the top teams in Wales. He was a stalwart of the Druids side between 1890 and 1910 and later became a member of the club committee. He had a reputation for strength and fitness and is reputed to have never left the field of play as a result of injury; he put his longevity down to "the entire abstention from tobacco and alcoholic drinks".

Despite being only a few inches over 5 feet tall, Davies was described as a "glutton for work"; the England international, C.B. Fry commented that he was "astonished to find a man of such diminutive stature capable of so much effective work".

During his Druids career, Davies played in five Welsh Cup finals, being on the winning side in 1898, 1899 and 1904 and finishing as runners-up in 1900 and 1901.

Davies made his international debut for Wales in a 2–1 defeat by England at Portsmouth's Fratton Park on 2 March 1903 and retained his place for the next two matches, a 1–0 defeat by Scotland and a 2–0 defeat by Ireland. His fourth and final international appearance was in a 1–1 draw with Scotland on 12 March 1904.

== Career outside football ==
Davies spent most of his working life at the Ruabon Brick and Terracotta Works.

== Family ==
Three of his brothers also played for Wales: Joe (7 appearances), Lloyd (16 appearances) and Robert (1 appearance).

== Honours ==
Druids

- Welsh Cup winners: 1898, 1899 and 1904
- Welsh Cup finalists: 1900 and 1901
