= Bert Beney =

English footballer

Personal information
- Full name: Benjamin Albert Beney
- Date of birth: 21 February 1887
- Place of birth: Hastings, England
- Date of death: 20 April 1915 (aged 28)
- Place of death: West Flanders, Belgium
- Position: Forward

Senior career*
| Years | Team | Apps | (Gls) |
| 1906–1909 | Hastings & St Leonards United | | |
| 1909–1910 | Woolwich Arsenal | 16 | (6) |
| 1910 | Carlisle United | | |
| 1910–1911 | Bury | 4 | (0) |
- Tunbridge Wells Rangers
- * Club domestic league appearances and goals

Benjamin Albert Beney (21 February 1887 – 20 April 1915) was an English professional footballer who played in the Football League for Woolwich Arsenal and Bury as a forward. He scored prolifically for Hastings & St Leonards United in non-League football, with 142 goals in 86 appearances.

== Personal life ==
Beney worked as a plumber's mate. He served as a corporal in the Royal Engineers during the First World War and died of wounds in West Flanders on 20 April 1915. Beney was buried in Poperinghe Old Military Cemetery.

== Career statistics ==
Appearances and goals by club, season and competition
| Club | Season | League | | | FA Cup | | Total | |
| Club | Season | Division | Apps | Goals | Apps | Goals | Apps | Goals |
|---|---|---|---|---|---|---|---|---|
| Woolwich Arsenal | 1908–09 | First Division | 8 | 3 | 0 | 0 | 8 | 3 |
| Woolwich Arsenal | 1909–10 | First Division | 8 | 3 | 1 | 0 | 9 | 3 |
| Career total | | | 16 | 6 | 1 | 0 | 17 | 6 |
