= Joe Davies (footballer, born 1864) =

Welsh footballer

Personal information
- Full name: Joseph E. Davies
- Date of birth: 12 July 1864
- Place of birth: Cefn Mawr, Wales
- Date of death: 7 October 1943 (aged 79)
- Place of death: Cefn Mawr, Wales
- Position: Half-back

Senior career*
| Years | Team | Apps | (Gls) |
| 1882–1886 | Druids | | |
| 1886–1890 | Newton Heath | 21 | (2) |
| 1890–1893 | Wolverhampton Wanderers | 34 | (0) |
| 1893–1895 | Druids | | |

International career
| 1888–1893 | Wales | 7 | (0) |
- * Club domestic league appearances and goals

Joseph E. Davies (12 July 1864 – 7 October 1943) was a Welsh footballer who played at half-back for Newton Heath and Wolverhampton Wanderers in the late 1880s and early 1890s. He also made seven appearances for the Welsh national team.

== Paying career ==
Born in Cefn Mawr, near Ruabon, he began his football career with local-based Druids in 1882. He immediately became a key member of the side which reached the fifth round of the FA Cup, going out to Blackburn Olympic in February 1883. A "solidly built" and totally reliable player, who was "strong in the tackle", his enthusiasm "drew the best out of his colleagues".

In 1886, he joined Newton Heath, along with his Druids teammates, brothers Jack and Roger Doughty. He made his competitive debut for the club in their first ever FA Cup match against Fleetwood Rangers on 30 October 1886, playing at centre-half. Davies played for Newton Heath for four seasons, making just over 50 competitive appearances and scoring seven goals, including 21 appearances in the Football Alliance in 1889–90.

In August 1890, he was transferred to Wolverhampton Wanderers of the First Division, where he made his debut on 15 September 1890 in a 4–2 win at Sunderland. Wolves reached the final of the FA Cup in 1893, but despite being a regular in the Football League with 18 appearances in 1892–93, Davies was not selected for the final against Everton, with Wolves fielding an all-English side. After the final, Davies made only one further appearance for Wolves and quit them in the summer. Having made 34 league appearances over his three seasons for the club he moved back to Wales to play for Druids again.

Davies won his first cap for Wales on 4 February 1888 in a 5–1 loss to England at Crewe. He added four more before leaving Newton Heath in 1890, and two final ones during his time at Wolves.

He retired from football in 1895 at the age of 31 and became a farmer, keeping a butcher's shop in Cefn Mawr until his death there in October 1943.

== Family ==
Three of his brothers also played for Wales: Lloyd (16 appearances), Robert (1 appearance) and Thomas (4 appearances).
