= Depot Battalion, RE F.C. =

Former association football club in England

Depot Battalion Royal Engineers F.C. was an English football club. In 1908 the club joined Division Two the Southern League. That season they finished third in the league and won the FA Amateur Cup, defeating Stockton 2–1 in the final. However, they left the league at the end of the season.
