= Robert Haywood (Scottish cricketer) =

Scottish cricketer and soldier

Personal information
- Full name: Robert Oliver Haywood
- Born: 22 April 1917; Northampton, Northamptonshire, England
- Died: 21 December 1963 (aged 46); Edinburgh, Midlothian, Scotland
- Batting: Right-handed
- Relatives: Robert Haywood (father); Bob Haywood (grandfather)

Domestic team information
- Years: Team
- 1949: Scotland

Career statistics
Competition	First-class
Matches	1
Runs scored	12
Batting average	6.00
100s/50s	–/–
Top score	12
Catches/stumpings	–/–
- Source: Cricinfo, 26 July 2022

Robert Oliver Haywood (22 April 1917 — 21 December 1963) was an English-born Scottish first-class cricketer and British Army officer.

The son of the cricketer Robert Allnutt Haywood, he was born at Northampton in April 1917. Moving to Scotland as a child when his father took up a coaching position at Fettes College, he was educated at Daniel Stewart's College. During the Second World War, Haywood was commissioned as a second lieutenant in the Royal Army Pay Corps in March 1943. He was given the war substantive rank of lieutenant in January 1945. Following the war, he was made a paymaster in April 1946, with him gaining the full rank of lieutenant in March 1947. A club cricketer for Stewart's College Former Pupils Cricket Club, he made a single appearance in first-class cricket for Scotland against Ireland at Belfast in 1949. Batting twice in the match, he was dismissed without scoring by Jack Bowden in Scotland's first innings, while in their second he was dismissed by George Wilson for 12 runs.

Alongside his post-war cricket, Haywood continued his military service. He was a short service commission into the Royal Artillery in April 1949, at which point he was promoted to captain. Haywood relinquished his commission in March 1950, on account of disability. Later that year he was decorated with the Territorial Army Efficiency Decoration. Following the end of his military career, he became an office equipment sales representative. Haywood died at Edinburgh in December 1963. His grandfather, Bob Haywood, was also a first-class cricketer.
