= Robert Haywood (cricketer, born 1858) =

English Cricketer

Personal information
- Full name: Robert John Haywood
- Born: 3 March 1858; Eltham, Kent
- Died: 9 May 1922 (aged 64); Eltham, London
- Relatives: Robert Haywood (son); Robert Haywood (grandson)

Domestic team information
- Years: Team
- 1878: Kent

Career statistics
Competition	First-class
Matches	1
Runs scored	0
Batting average	0.00
100s/50s	0/0
Top score	0*
Balls bowled	20
Wickets	0
Bowling average	–
5 wickets in innings	–
10 wickets in match	–
Best bowling	–
Catches/stumpings	0/–
- Source: CricInfo, 4 January 2012

Robert John Haywood (3 March 1858 – 9 May 1922) was an English cricketer. He was born at Eltham in Kent and played one first-class cricket match for Kent County Cricket Club in 1878.

He was, according to his Wisden obituary, "well known in metropolitan cricket" and died at Eltham in May 1922 aged 64. His oldest son Robert had a lengthy first-class career for Northamptonshire County Cricket Club and his younger son Archie played for Kent's Second XI before and after the First World War and coached at Taunton School. His grandson, also called Robert, played one first-class match for Scotland in 1949.

== Bibliography ==
- Carlaw, Derek (2020). Kent County Cricketers, A to Z: Part One (1806–1914) (PDF). Cardiff: ACS.
