= Jack Allan (footballer, born 1886) =

English footballer

Personal information
- Date of birth: 28 December 1886
- Place of birth: Wallsend, England
- Date of death: 4 May 1919 (aged 32)
- Place of death: Wallsend, England
- Height: 5 ft 9 in (1.75 m)
- Position: Forward

Senior career*
Years	Team	Apps	(Gls)
- Wallsend
1907	Sunderland	0	(0)
1908–1911	Newcastle United	15	(5)
1911–1912	West Bromwich Albion	19	(4)
1912–1914	Nottingham Forest	22	(3)
- Worcester City
- * Club domestic league appearances and goals

Stanley James E. "Jack" Allan (28 December 1886 – 4 May 1919) was an English professional footballer who played in the Football League for Newcastle United, West Bromwich Albion and Nottingham Forest as a forward.

== Personal life ==
Allan attended College of St Hild and St Bede, Durham between 1906 and 1908 and during that time, he worked as a physical education teacher at a school in Wallsend. He later taught physical education at the Higher Grade School in Stockton-on-Tees. Allan married in 1915 and had two children. He served as a private in the Royal Army Medical Corps during the First World War and served on the Western Front from May 1918 through the April 1919, after the war. While home on demobilisation leave in May 1919, Allan died of a combination of Spanish flu and pneumonia and he was buried in Church Bank Cemetery, Wallsend.

== Career statistics ==
Appearances and goals by club, season and competition
Club	Season	League			FA Cup		Other		Total	
Club	Season	Division	Apps	Goals	Apps	Goals	Apps	Goals	Apps	Goals
Newcastle United	1908–09	First Division	9	5	0	0	1 (Note: Appearance in FA Charity Shield)	0	10	5
Newcastle United	1909–10	First Division	4	0	0	0	—		4	0
Newcastle United	1910–11	First Division	2	0	0	0	—		2	0
Newcastle United	Total		15	5	0	0	1	0	16	5
West Bromwich Albion	1911–12	First Division	19	4	1	0	—		20	4
Nottingham Forest	1912–13	Second Division	16	2	0	0	—		16	2
Nottingham Forest	1913–14	Second Division	6	1	0	0	—		6	1
Nottingham Forest	Total		22	3	0	0	—		22	3
Career total			56	12	1	0	1	0	58	12

== Honours ==
Newcastle United

- FA Charity Shield: 1909
