= Frank McDiarmid =

Scottish footballer (born 1880)

Personal information
- Full name: Frank McDiarmid
- Date of birth: 1880
- Position: Full back

Senior career*
Years	Team	Apps	(Gls)
–1906	Dundee		
1906–1907	Tottenham Hotspur	7	(0)
1907–1911	Northampton Town	138	(18)
1911–19??	Distillery		
- * Club domestic league appearances and goals

Frank McDiarmid (born 1880) was a Scottish professional footballer who played for Dundee, Tottenham Hotspur and Northampton Town.

== Career ==
McDiarmid started his career in Scotland with Dundee and played for the Scottish League against in the Irish League in February 1902. McDiarmid joined Tottenham Hotspur in 1906 and played for only one season with the club. His debut with Tottenham was a home match in the Southern League against West Ham United on 1 September 1906. Spurs lost the game 2–1. McDiarmid moved to Northampton Town where he spent four seasons.

== Career statistics ==
Club	Division	Season	Southern League		Western League		Other		Total	
Club	Division	Season	Apps	Goals	Apps	Goals	Apps	Goals	Apps	Goals
Tottenham Hotspur	Southern League	1906–07	7	0	4	0	3	0	14	0

== Works cited ==
- Soar, Phil (1995). Tottenham Hotspur The Official Illustrated History 1882–1995. Hamlyn. ISBN 0-600-58706-1.
- Goodwin, Bob (1992). The Spurs Alphabet. ACL & Polar Publishing (UK) Ltd. ISBN 0-9514862-8-4.
