= Lloyd Davies =

Welsh footballer

Personal information
- Full name: Lloyd Davies
- Date of birth: 23 February 1877
- Place of birth: Cefn Mawr, Wales
- Date of death: 10 October 1957 (aged 80)
- Place of death: Cefn Mawr, Wales
- Positions: Outside left; defender

Senior career*
Years	Team	Apps	(Gls)
1897–1899	Rhosymedre St John's		
1899–1903	Druids		
1903–1904	Stoke	7	(3)
1904	Wellington Town		
1904–1905	Swindon Town	0	(0)
1905–1907	Stoke	27	(0)
1908–1920	Northampton Town	311	(3)
Total		345	(6)

International career
1904–1914	Wales	16	(1)
- * Club domestic league appearances and goals

Lloyd Davies (23 February 1877–10 October 1957) was a Welsh footballer who played in the English Football League for Stoke and had a long career in the Southern League with Northampton Town. He also earned 16 caps for the Wales national team.

== Career ==
Davies was born in Cefn Mawr and played for Rhosymedre St John's and Druids before joining Stoke in 1903. He played 7 matches in 1903–04 at outside left scoring three goals but then left Stoke in March 1904 for Wellington Town and then Swindon Town before returning to the Victoria Ground in December 1905. He played 26 matches for Stoke in 1906–07 which saw him occupy the full back position but was not very successful as Stoke suffered relegation from the First Division. He then joined Northampton Town where he would go on to enjoy a 12-year spell making well over 320 appearances for the "Cobblers".

Three of his brothers also played for Wales: Joe (7 appearances), Robert (1 appearance) and Thomas (4 appearances).

== Career statistics ==
=== Club ===
Club	Season	League			FA Cup		Charity Shield		Total	
Club	Season	Division	Apps	Goals	Apps	Goals	Apps	Goals	Apps	Goals
Stoke	1903–04	First Division	7	3	0	0	0	0	7	3
Stoke	1905–06	First Division	2	0	0	0	0	0	2	0
Stoke	1906–07	First Division	23	0	3	0	0	0	26	0
Stoke	1907–08	Second Division	2	0	0	0	0	0	2	0
Stoke	Total		34	3	3	0	0	0	37	3
Northampton Town	1907–08	Southern League	23	1	2	0	0	0	25	1
Northampton Town	1908–09	Southern League	39	1	2	0	1	0	42	1
Northampton Town	1909–10	Southern League	35	0	1	0	0	0	36	0
Northampton Town	1910–11	Southern League	34	0	3	0	0	0	37	0
Northampton Town	1911–12	Southern League	34	0	4	0	0	0	38	0
Northampton Town	1912–13	Southern League	38	1	1	0	0	0	39	1
Northampton Town	1913–14	Southern League	36	0	1	0	0	0	37	0
Northampton Town	1914–15	Southern League	36	0	2	0	0	0	38	0
Northampton Town	1919–20	Southern League	36	0	2	0	0	0	38	0
Northampton Town	Total		311	3	18	0	1	0	330	3
Career Total			345	6	21	0	1	0	367	6

=== International ===
National team	Year	Apps	Goals
Wales	1904	1	1
Wales	1907	3	0
Wales	1908	1	0
Wales	1909	1	0
Wales	1910	1	0
Wales	1911	2	0
Wales	1912	2	0
Wales	1913	2	0
Wales	1914	3	0
Total		16	1
