= Edwin Freeman =

English cricketer

Personal information
- Full name: Edwin Freeman
- Date of birth: 5 June 1886
- Place of birth: Northampton, England
- Date of death: 1945 (aged 58–59)
- Position: Inside forward

Senior career*
Years	Team	Apps	(Gls)
1904–1905	Stoke	0	(0)
1905–1908	Regent Templars		
1905–1920	Northampton Town	341	(19)
Total		341	(19)
- * Club domestic league appearances and goals

Edwin Freeman (5 June 1886 – 1945) was an English cricketer and footballer active from 1908 to 1920 who played for Northamptonshire and Northampton Town.

== Career ==
Freeman began his football career as an amateur with Stoke in the 1904–05 season. He spent the campaign with the reserve side playing in the Birmingham & District League. After a period with non-league side Regent Templars, he played 28 times for his home-town club Northampton Town in the 1920–21 season.

Freeman appeared in sixteen first-class matches as a righthanded batsman who bowled right arm medium pace. He scored 133 runs with a highest score of 30 and took six wickets with a best performance of three for 62.

== Career statistics ==
Club	Season	League			FA Cup		Total	
Club	Season	Division	Apps	Goals	Apps	Goals	Apps	Goals
Stoke	1904–05	First Division	0	0	0	0	0	0
Northampton Town	1920–21	Third Division South	25	2	3	0	28	2
Career total			25	2	3	0	28	2
