= Robert Haywood (cricketer, born 1887) =

English cricketer

Personal information
- Full name: Robert Allnutt Haywood
- Born: 16 September 1887; Eltham, Kent, England
- Died: 1 June 1942 (aged 54); Edinburgh, Midlothian, Scotland
- Batting: Right-handed
- Bowling: Right-arm medium
- Relatives: Robert Haywood (father); Robert Haywood (son)

Domestic team information
- Years: Team
- 1908–1924: Northamptonshire

Career statistics
Competition	First-class
Matches	172
Runs scored	8,373
Batting average	28.77
100s/50s	20/34
Top score	198
Balls bowled	2,013
Wickets	34
Bowling average	43.11
5 wickets in innings	–
10 wickets in match	–
Best bowling	3/73
Catches/stumpings	85/–
- Source: Cricinfo, 26 July 2022

Robert Allnutt Haywood (16 September 1887 – 1 June 1942) was an English cricketer who played for Northamptonshire County Cricket Club between 1908 and 1924.

He was born in Eltham in Kent, the son of Robert and Elizabeth Haywood. His father had played one first-class match for Kent County Cricket Club in 1878 and his younger brother Archie played Second XI cricket for Kent either side of World War I and later coached at Taunton School. Haywood was for a time engaged with the Kent Nursery, but considering that he would do better with Northamptonshire, he took the necessary steps to qualify for the county. Haywood appeared in 172 first-class cricket matches, primarily as a batsman. He scored 8,373 runs with a highest score of 198, one of 20 centuries, and took 34 wickets with a best performance of 3/73. In 1921, he carried his bat against Sussex, making 131 out of his side's total of 251. In his final season he made 1,887 runs and was considered "by far the most valuable batsman for the county", scoring eight of the 11 centuries made by the side that season.

Haywood retired from professional cricket to become coach at Fettes College in Scotland after Northamptonshire rejected his request for a guarantee of £400 for 10 years and a benefit of £500 in 1930. His son, also Robert, played one first-class match for Scotland in 1949. Haywood died in Edinburgh in June 1942 aged 54.
