= Hastings & St Leonards United F.C. =

Hastings & St Leonards United
- Full name: Hastings & St Leonards United Football Club
- Nicknames: Reds and Greens, Hastingers; Saints (as St Leonards); Greenbacks (as St Leonards)
- Founded: 1906
- Dissolved: 1910
- Ground: Central Recreation Ground; The Sports Ground
- League: Southern League; South Eastern League; United League

Hastings & St Leonards United was a professional football club based in Hastings, East Sussex. The club spent four seasons playing in the Southern League, whilst also competing in the South Eastern League and United League.

== History ==
Hastings & St Leonards United was formed in 1906 by the merger of Hastings & St Leonards FC and St Leonards United. Both clubs had been struggling financially after failing to attract sufficient crowds and after a meeting between the two board of directors, it was decided that it was in the best interests of local football to merge the two rival clubs.

=== Hastings & St Leonards ===
Hastings & St Leonards FC was formed in 1890 as Hastings Athletic, they were part of the Hastings & St Leonards Amateur Athletic Club who were based on the Central Recreation Ground and the club colours were red and blue. In 1895 the club changed their name to Hastings & St Leonards (often shortened to Hastings FC) and in 1896 became founder members of the East Sussex League, winning the competition four times. In 1904 they entered the South Eastern League, which was founded as a league for reserve teams for the professional clubs playing, however Hastings joined the teams such as Hitchin and Eastbourne who were also amateur sides competing in a professional league.

=== St Leonards United ===
St Leonards United was founded as St Leonards FC in 1898 and were nicknamed the 'Greenbacks' due to the club colours of green and white. The club used a green and white version of the St Leonards coat of arms designed by James Burton. For their first season they played home games at The Green in St Leonards, before switching to Silverhill. They entered the East Sussex League in 1899, winning the competition in 1903, before turning professional and entering the Southern and South Eastern Leagues in 1905. Their move into professional football meant a change of name to St Leonards United and a move to the purpose-built 'Sports Ground', sharing with Rock-a-Nore.

=== Two clubs merge ===
After the merger, the club had full use of the facilities at the 'Sports Ground', following Rock-a-Nores move back to the East Hill in Hastings Old Town. The club colours were now red and green, a combination of the previous club colours and old places in the Southern and South Eastern Leagues were taken up by the new club. The club were to spend four seasons trying to achieve promotion from Division Two of the Southern League and in the 1909–10 season they won Division Two B, but lost in a play-off tie against Stoke and were denied promotion once more. By now the club had mounting debts and were still struggling for attendances needed to sustain professional football and the club was wound up at the end of the 1909–10 season.

== Seasons ==
Seasons of Hastings & St Leonards United F.C.
Season	League									FA Cup	Top Scorer	
Season	Division	P	W	D	L	F	A	Pts	Pos	FA Cup	Name	Goals
1906–07	Southern League Division Two	21	10	4	7	46	31	24	5th	R1	Bert Beney	49
1906–07	Southern Eastern League Division One	24	13	5	6	82	40	31	3rd	R1	Bert Beney	49
1906–07	United League	14	6	2	6	27	24	14	5th	R1	Bert Beney	49
1907–08	Southern League Division Two	18	10	2	6	43	29	22	4th	R1	Bert Beney	60
1907–08	Southern Eastern League Division One	34	19	6	9	93	48	44	3rd	R1	Bert Beney	60
1908–09	Southern League Division Two	12	8	1	3	42	18	17	2nd	R1	Bert Beney	33
1908–09	Southern Eastern League Division One	38	18	8	12	75	44	44	8th	R1	Bert Beney	33
1909–10	Southern League Division Two B	9	6	3	0	26	11	15	1st	5Q	Kent	20
1909–10	Southern Eastern League Division One	34	11	8	15	53	62	30	12th	5Q	Kent	20

== Players ==
- For all Hastings & St Leonards United players with a Wikipedia article see Category:Hastings & St Leonards United F.C. players.

== Colours ==
The club's colours were "the glorious red of England and the emerald green of Ireland."

== Ground ==
The Sports Ground, located in what is now White Rock Gardens, was the club's home pitch for the 1906–07 season. However, for the following seasons they played mostly at Central Recreation Ground, using the Sports Ground when their main pitch was unavailable. The Central Ground, as it was often shortened to, was used by the Hastings club before the merger whilst pitches at the Green, Silverhill and the Sports Ground were used by St Leonards.

== Honours ==
- Southern League
  - Southern League Division 2 Runners Up (1) 1908–09
  - Southern League Division 2B Winners (1) 1909–10

== Records ==
- Record attendance: 4,000 vs Portsmouth, FA Cup 1st Round, 11 January 1908.
- Transfer fee received: £250 from Arsenal for Bert Beney, February 1909.
- Biggest win: 10-0 vs Croydon Common, South Eastern League, 11 September 1907.
- Biggest defeat: 0-6 vs Stoke, Southern League Division Two Play-off, 25 April 1910.
- Most goals in a season: Bert Beney, 60 (1907–08)
