= Fred Lessons =

English footballer

Personal information
- Full name: George Frederick Lessons
- Date of birth: 30 August 1883
- Place of birth: Heaton Norris, England
- Date of death: 7 September 1918 (aged 35)
- Place of death: Pas-de-Calais, France
- Position: Centre forward

Youth career
- Lawrence

Senior career*
Years	Team	Apps	(Gls)
1903–1904	Nottingham Jardines Athletic		
1904–1907	Nottingham Forest	31	(8)
1907–1915	Northampton Town	234	(75)
Total		265	(83)

Managerial career
- 1913–1918: Northampton Town
- * Club domestic league appearances and goals

George Frederick Lessons (30 August 1883 – 7 September 1918), sometimes known as Frank Lessons, was an English professional footballer who made nearly 250 appearances as a centre forward in the Southern League for Northampton Town. He also managed the club and earlier in his career played in the Football League for Nottingham Forest.

== Personal life ==
Lessons served as a lance corporal in the Northamptonshire Regiment during the First World War and was killed on the Western Front on 7 September 1918, just over two months before the armistice. He is buried in Éterpigny British Cemetery.

== Career statistics ==
Appearances and goals by club, season and competition
Club	Season	League			FA Cup		Total	
Club	Season	Division	Apps	Goals	Apps	Goals	Apps	Goals
Nottingham Forest	1904–05	First Division	16	3	0	0	16	3
Nottingham Forest	1905–06	First Division	14	5	0	0	14	5
Nottingham Forest	1906–07	Second Division	1	0	2	0	3	0
Career total			31	8	2	0	33	8

== Honours ==
Northampton Town

- Southern League First Division: 1908–09
