= 1903–04 Southern Football League =

The 1903–04 season was the tenth in the history of Southern League. Division One, expanded up to 18 teams, was won by Southampton for the 6th time in history. Watford finished top of Division Two, earning automatic promotion, the first time that test matches had not been held. No clubs applied to join the Football League.

== Division One ==
Southern Football League Division One
- Season: 1903–04
- Champions: Southampton (6th title)
- Promoted: none
- Relegated: Kettering (resigned)
- Matches: 306
- Goals: 809 (2.64 per match)

A total of 18 teams contest the division, including 15 sides from previous season and three new teams.

Teams promoted from Division Two:

- Brighton & Hove Albion
- Fulham

Newly elected team:

- Plymouth Argyle

Pos	Team	Pld	W	D	L	GF	GA	GR	Pts	Relegation
1	Southampton	34	22	6	6	75	30	2.500	50	
2	Tottenham Hotspur	34	16	11	7	54	37	1.459	43	
3	Bristol Rovers	34	17	8	9	64	42	1.524	42	
4	Portsmouth	34	17	8	9	41	38	1.079	42	
5	Queens Park Rangers	34	15	11	8	53	37	1.432	41	
6	Reading	34	14	13	7	48	35	1.371	41	
7	Millwall	34	16	8	10	64	42	1.524	40	
8	Luton Town	34	14	12	8	38	33	1.152	40	
9	Plymouth Argyle	34	13	10	11	44	34	1.294	36	
10	Swindon Town	34	10	11	13	30	42	0.714	31	
11	Fulham	34	9	12	13	34	36	0.944	30	
12	West Ham United	34	10	7	17	39	44	0.886	27	
13	Brentford	34	9	9	16	34	48	0.708	27	
14	Wellingborough	34	11	5	18	44	63	0.698	27	
15	Northampton Town	34	10	7	17	36	60	0.600	27	
16	New Brompton	34	6	13	15	26	43	0.605	25	
17	Brighton & Hove Albion	34	6	12	16	46	69	0.667	24	
18	Kettering	34	6	7	21	39	76	0.513	19	Left league at end of season

Source: rsssf.com
Rules for classification: The system of using goal average to separate two teams tied on points was used until the 1976-77 season. The points system: 2 points for a win, 1 point for a draw and 0 points for losing.

== Division Two ==
Southern Football League Division Two
- Season: 1903–04
- Champions: Watford
- Promoted: Watford
- Relegated: Millwall II (resigned); Chesham Town (resigned)
- Matches: 110
- Goals: 480 (4.36 per match)

A total of eleven teams contest the division, including 4 sides from previous season, one team relegated from Division One and six new clubs in Division Two this season, all of which were reserve teams.

Teams promoted from Division Two:

- Watford

Newly elected teams:

- Millwall II
- Fulham II
- Portsmouth II
- Reading II
- Southampton II
- Swindon Town II

Pos	Team	Pld	W	D	L	GF	GA	GR	Pts	Promotion or relegation
1	Watford	20	18	2	0	70	15	4.667	38	Promoted to Division One
2	Portsmouth II	20	15	2	3	85	25	3.400	32	
3	Millwall II	20	9	4	7	35	39	0.897	22	Left league at end of season
4	Southampton II	20	9	3	8	59	35	1.686	21	
5	Grays United	20	9	3	8	25	55	0.455	21	
6	Fulham II	20	8	4	8	40	34	1.176	20	
7	Swindon Town II	20	8	3	9	50	44	1.136	19	
8	Reading II	20	8	2	10	43	42	1.024	18	
9	Wycombe Wanderers	20	5	5	10	29	64	0.453	15	
10	Southall	20	4	2	14	25	62	0.403	10	
11	Chesham Town	20	1	2	17	19	65	0.292	4	Left league at end of season

Source: rsssf.com
Rules for classification: The system of using goal average to separate two teams tied on points was used until the 1976-77 season. The points system: 2 points for a win, 1 point for a draw and 0 points for losing.
