= Robert Walker (footballer, born 1884) =

English footballer

Personal information
- Full name: Robert Henry Walker
- Date of birth: January 1884
- Place of birth: Northallerton, England
- Date of death: late 1940s
- Place of death: Cleveland, Ohio, USA
- Position: Inside right

Senior career*
Years	Team	Apps	(Gls)
1906–1906	Middlesbrough	14	(3)
1906–1908	Tottenham Hotspur	25	(3)
1908	New Brompton	8	(0)
1908–1910	Northampton Town	67	(24)
1910–1911	Millwall	16	
1911–1912	Luton Town	28	(8)
1912–1915	Bristol Rovers	108	(11)
- * Club domestic league appearances and goals

Robert Henry Walker (1884 – late 1940s) was a professional footballer who played for Luton Town, Bristol Rovers, Millwall, Northampton, New Brompton, Tottenham Hotspur, and Middlesbrough around the time of the First World War.

Walker joined Bristol Rovers from Luton town in 1912 after first playing for Middlesbrough, Spurs, New Brompton (now Gillingham), Northampton and Millwall and played 108 Southern League games, scoring forty two goals, before moving to the United States and continuing his footballing career in the Ohio League.
