= 1905–06 Southern Football League =

The 1905–06 season was the 12th in the history of Southern League. Fulham won Division One and Crystal Palace finished top of Division Two. No clubs were relegated from Division One as it was expanded to 20 clubs the following season. No clubs applied to join the Football League.

== Division One ==
Southern Football League Division One
- Season: 1905–06
- Champions: Fulham (1st title)
- Promoted: none
- Relegated: none
- Matches: 306
- Goals: 812 (2.65 per match)

A total of 18 teams contest the division, including 17 sides from previous season and one new team.

Newly elected team:

- Norwich City

Pos	Team	Pld	W	D	L	GF	GA	GR	Pts
1	Fulham	34	19	12	3	44	15	2.933	50
2	Southampton	34	19	7	8	58	39	1.487	45
3	Portsmouth	34	17	9	8	61	35	1.743	43
4	Luton Town	34	17	7	10	64	40	1.600	41
5	Tottenham Hotspur	34	16	7	11	46	29	1.586	39
6	Plymouth Argyle	34	16	7	11	52	33	1.576	39
7	Norwich City	34	13	10	11	46	38	1.211	36
8	Bristol Rovers	34	15	5	14	56	56	1.000	35
9	Brentford	34	14	7	13	43	52	0.827	35
10	Reading	34	12	9	13	53	46	1.152	33
11	West Ham United	34	14	5	15	42	39	1.077	33
12	Millwall	34	11	11	12	38	41	0.927	33
13	Queens Park Rangers	34	12	7	15	58	44	1.318	31
14	Watford	34	8	10	16	38	57	0.667	26
15	Swindon Town	34	8	9	17	31	52	0.596	25
16	Brighton & Hove Albion	34	9	7	18	30	55	0.545	25
17	New Brompton	34	7	8	19	20	62	0.323	22
18	Northampton Town	34	8	5	21	32	79	0.405	21

Rules for classification: The system of using goal average to separate two teams tied on points was used until the 1976-77 season. The points system: 2 points for a win, 1 point for a draw and 0 points for losing.

== Division Two ==
Southern Football League Division Two
- Season: 1905–06
- Champions: Crystal Palace
- Promoted: Crystal Palace; Leyton
- Relegated: Southern United (resigned); Watford II (resigned); Grays United (resigned)
- Matches: 156
- Goals: 590 (3.78 per match)

A total of 13 teams contest the division, including 9 sides from previous season and four new teams, all of them are newly elected teams.

Newly elected teams:

- Crystal Palace
- Leyton
- St Leonards United
- Southern United

Pos	Team	Pld	W	D	L	GF	GA	GR	Pts	Promotion or relegation
1	Crystal Palace	24	19	4	1	66	14	4.714	42	Promoted to Division One
2	Leyton	24	16	6	2	61	18	3.389	38	Promoted to Division One
3	Portsmouth II	24	12	8	4	52	24	2.167	32	
4	Fulham II	24	11	6	7	52	39	1.333	28	
5	Southampton II	24	7	9	8	39	41	0.951	23	
6	Southern United	24	8	7	9	45	49	0.918	23	Left league at end of season
7	St Leonards United (Note: Changed name to Hastings & St Leonards United at end of season)	24	9	4	11	54	50	1.080	22	
8	Watford II	24	8	5	11	43	47	0.915	21	Left league at end of season
9	West Ham United II	24	7	5	12	46	48	0.958	19	
10	Grays United	24	8	3	13	24	77	0.312	19	Left league at end of season
11	Reading II	24	6	5	13	36	49	0.735	17	
12	Swindon Town II	24	5	5	14	36	51	0.706	15	
13	Wycombe Wanderers	24	5	3	16	36	83	0.434	13	

Rules for classification: The system of using goal average to separate two teams tied on points was used until the 1976-77 season. The points system: 2 points for a win, 1 point for a draw and 0 points for losing.
