= 1906–07 Southern Football League =

The 1906–07 season was the 13th in the history of Southern League. Fulham won Division One for a consecutive title and were elected to the Football League. No other teams were applied for election to the Football League. Southend United won Division Two, but there was no promotion or relegation between the divisions.

== Division One ==
Southern Football League Division One
- Season: 1906–07
- Champions: Fulham (2nd title)
- Promoted: none
- Relegated: none
- Matches: 380
- Goals: 1,035 (2.72 per match)

A total of 20 teams contest the division, including 18 sides from previous season and two teams promoted from Division Two.

Teams promoted from 1905–06 Division Two:

- Crystal Palace
- Leyton

Pos	Team	Pld	W	D	L	GF	GA	GR	Pts	Qualification
1	Fulham	38	20	13	5	58	32	1.813	53	Elected to the Football League Second Division
2	Portsmouth	38	22	7	9	64	36	1.778	51	
3	Brighton & Hove Albion	38	18	9	11	53	43	1.233	45	
4	Luton Town	38	18	9	11	52	52	1.000	45	
5	West Ham United	38	15	14	9	60	41	1.463	44	
6	Tottenham Hotspur	38	17	9	12	63	45	1.400	43	
7	Millwall	38	18	6	14	71	50	1.420	42	
8	Norwich City	38	15	12	11	57	48	1.188	42	
9	Watford	38	13	16	9	46	43	1.070	42	
10	Brentford	38	17	8	13	57	56	1.018	42	
11	Southampton	38	13	9	16	49	56	0.875	35	
12	Reading	38	14	6	18	57	47	1.213	34	
13	Leyton	38	11	12	15	38	60	0.633	34	
14	Bristol Rovers	38	12	9	17	55	54	1.019	33	
15	Plymouth Argyle	38	10	13	15	43	50	0.860	33	
16	New Brompton	38	12	9	17	47	59	0.797	33	
17	Swindon Town	38	11	11	16	43	54	0.796	33	
18	Queens Park Rangers	38	11	10	17	47	55	0.855	32	
19	Crystal Palace	38	8	9	21	46	66	0.697	25	
20	Northampton Town	38	5	9	24	29	88	0.330	19	

Rules for classification: The system of using goal average to separate two teams tied on points was used until the 1976-77 season. The points system: 2 points for a win, 1 point for a draw and 0 points for losing.

== Division Two ==
Southern Football League Division Two
- Season: 1906–07
- Champions: Southend United
- Promoted: none
- Relegated: West Ham United II (resigned); Fulham II (resigned); Reading II (resigned); Royal Engineers Aldershot (resigned)
- Matches: 132
- Goals: 513 (3.89 per match)

A total of 12 teams contest the division, including 8 sides from previous season and four new teams, all of them are newly elected teams.

Newly elected teams:

- Tunbridge Wells Rangers - transferred from Kent League
- Southend United
- Salisbury City
- Royal Engineers Aldershot

Pos	Team	Pld	W	D	L	GF	GA	GR	Pts	Relegation
1	Southend United	22	14	5	3	58	23	2.522	33	
2	West Ham United II	22	14	3	5	64	30	2.133	31	Left league at end of season
3	Portsmouth II	22	11	6	5	53	44	1.205	28	
4	Fulham II	22	11	4	7	47	32	1.469	26	Left league at end of season
5	Hastings & St.Leonards	21	10	4	7	46	31	1.484	24	
6	Tunbridge Wells Rangers	22	10	1	11	46	36	1.278	21	
7	Salisbury City	22	9	2	11	40	42	0.952	20	
8	Southampton II	22	8	2	12	37	56	0.661	18	
9	Swindon Town II	22	7	3	12	35	46	0.761	17	
10	Reading II	22	6	4	12	32	47	0.681	16	Left league at end of season
11	Royal Engineers Aldershot	21	5	4	12	27	58	0.466	14	Left league at end of season
12	Wycombe Wanderers	22	4	6	12	28	68	0.412	14	

Rules for classification: The system of using goal average to separate two teams tied on points was used until the 1976-77 season. The points system: 2 points for a win, 1 point for a draw and 0 points for losing.

== Football League elections ==
Only one Southern League club, Fulham, applied for election to Division Two of the Football League. They offered midland clubs £15 and northern clubs £20 in expenses for travelling to London and were successful, topping the ballot, and replaced Burton United in the League.

Club	League	Votes
Fulham	Southern League	??
Lincoln City	Football League	28
Chesterfield Town	Football League	23
Oldham Athletic	Lancashire Combination	17
Bradford Park Avenue	None	11
Burton United	Football League	7
Rotherham Town	Midland League	0
Wigan Town	The Combination	0
Salford United	Manchester League	0
