= 1904–05 Southern Football League =

The 1904–05 season was the 11th in the history of Southern League. Bristol Rovers won Division One for the first time and Fulham reserves finished top of Division Two. Division Two club Clapton Orient were the only Southern League club to apply for election to the Football League, and were successful after a decision was made to expand the League to 40 clubs.

== Division One ==
Southern Football League Division One
- Season: 1904–05
- Champions: Bristol Rovers (1st title)
- Promoted: none
- Relegated: Wellingborough (resigned)
- Matches: 306
- Goals: 854 (2.79 per match)

A total of 18 teams contest the division, including 17 sides from previous season and one new team. Watford returned to Division after one season of absence.

Teams promoted from Division Two:

- Watford

Pos	Team	Pld	W	D	L	GF	GA	GR	Pts	Relegation
1	Bristol Rovers	34	20	8	6	74	36	2.056	48	
2	Reading	34	18	7	9	57	38	1.500	43	
3	Southampton	34	18	7	9	54	40	1.350	43	
4	Plymouth Argyle	34	18	5	11	57	39	1.462	41	
5	Tottenham Hotspur	34	15	8	11	53	34	1.559	38	
6	Fulham	34	14	10	10	46	34	1.353	38	
7	Queens Park Rangers	34	14	8	12	51	46	1.109	36	
8	Portsmouth	34	16	4	14	61	56	1.089	36	
9	New Brompton	34	11	11	12	40	40	1.000	33	
10	Watford	34	15	3	16	44	45	0.978	33	
11	West Ham United	34	12	8	14	48	42	1.143	32	
12	Brighton & Hove Albion	34	13	6	15	44	45	0.978	32	
13	Northampton Town	34	12	8	14	43	54	0.796	32	
14	Brentford	34	10	9	15	33	38	0.868	29	
15	Millwall	34	11	7	16	38	47	0.809	29	
16	Swindon Town	34	12	5	17	41	59	0.695	29	
17	Luton Town	34	12	3	19	45	54	0.833	27	
18	Wellingborough	34	5	3	26	25	107	0.234	13	Left league at end of season

Rules for classification: The system of using goal average to separate two teams tied on points was used up until the 1976–77 season. The points system: 2 points for a win, 1 point for a draw and 0 points for losing.

== Division Two ==
Southern Football League Division Two
- Season: 1904–05
- Champions: Fulham II
- Promoted: Clapton Orient (to Football League)
- Relegated: Brighton & Hove Albion II (resigned); Southall (resigned)
- Matches: 132
- Goals: 582 (4.41 per match)

A total of 12 teams contest the division, including 8 sides from previous season and four new teams, three of which were reserve teams.

Newly elected teams:

- Clapton Orient
- Brighton & Hove Albion II
- Watford II
- West Ham United II,

Pos	Team	Pld	W	D	L	GF	GA	GR	Pts	Promotion or relegation
1	Fulham II	22	16	4	2	78	25	3.120	36	
2	Portsmouth II	22	14	2	6	75	28	2.679	30	
3	Swindon Town II	22	12	3	7	54	47	1.149	27	
4	Grays United	22	11	3	8	61	40	1.525	25	
5	Southampton II	22	10	5	7	52	35	1.486	25	
6	Brighton & Hove Albion II	22	9	3	10	48	49	0.980	21	Left league at end of season
7	West Ham United II	22	8	5	9	45	47	0.957	21	
8	Clapton Orient	22	7	7	8	47	56	0.839	21	Elected to the Football League Second Division
9	Watford II	22	5	6	11	30	62	0.484	16	
10	Southall	22	7	2	13	31	66	0.470	16	Left league at end of season
11	Wycombe Wanderers	22	6	2	14	37	70	0.529	14	
12	Reading II	22	4	4	14	24	57	0.421	12	

Rules for classification: The system of using goal average to separate two teams tied on points was used up until the 1976–77 season. The points system: 2 points for a win, 1 point for a draw and 0 points for losing.

== Football League elections ==
Only one Southern League club, Clapton Orient of Division Two, applied for election to Division Two of the Football League. Although they were not elected in the first round, it was later agreed to expand the Football League from 36 to 40 clubs and all the unsuccessful candidates except Doncaster Rovers were elected.

Club	League	Votes
Leeds City	West Yorkshire League	25
Port Vale	Football League	21
Chelsea	None*	20
Hull City	None*	18
Burton United	Football League	
Doncaster Rovers	Football League	
Stockport County	Midland League	3
Clapton Orient	Southern League	1

* Chelsea had played no games, nor had any players when they were elected. Hull City had been formed in 1904, but had only played friendly matches during the 1904–05 season.
