= 1908–09 Southern Football League =

The 1908–09 season was the 15th in the history of Southern Football League. Northampton Town won Division One and Croydon Common finished top of Division Two. No clubs applied for election to the Football League.

== Division One ==
Southern Football League Division One
- Season: 1908–09
- Champions: Northampton Town (1st title)
- Promoted: none
- Relegated: none
- Matches: 420
- Goals: 1,276 (3.04 per match)

A total of 21 teams contested the division, including 18 sides from previous season and three new teams.

Team promoted from 1907–08 Division Two:

- Southend United

Newly elected teams:

- Exeter City
- Coventry City

Pos	Team	Pld	W	D	L	GF	GA	GR	Pts
1	Northampton Town	40	25	5	10	90	45	2.000	55
2	Swindon Town	40	22	5	13	96	55	1.745	49
3	Southampton	40	19	10	11	67	58	1.155	48
4	Portsmouth	40	18	10	12	68	60	1.133	46
5	Bristol Rovers	40	17	9	14	60	63	0.952	43
6	Exeter City	40	18	6	16	56	65	0.862	42
7	New Brompton	40	17	7	16	48	59	0.814	41
8	Reading	40	11	18	11	60	57	1.053	40
9	Luton Town	40	17	6	17	59	60	0.983	40
10	Plymouth Argyle	40	15	10	15	46	47	0.979	40
11	Millwall	40	16	6	18	59	61	0.967	38
12	Southend United	40	14	10	16	52	54	0.963	38
13	Leyton	40	15	8	17	52	55	0.945	38
14	Watford	40	14	9	17	51	64	0.797	37
15	Queens Park Rangers	40	12	12	16	52	50	1.040	36
16	Crystal Palace	40	12	12	16	62	62	1.000	36
17	West Ham United	40	16	4	20	56	60	0.933	36
18	Brighton & Hove Albion	40	14	7	19	60	61	0.984	35
19	Norwich City	40	12	11	17	59	75	0.787	35
20	Coventry City	40	15	4	21	64	91	0.703	34
21	Brentford	40	13	7	20	59	74	0.797	33

Rules for classification: The system of using goal average to separate two teams tied on points was used until the 1976-77 season. The points system: 2 points for a win, 1 point for a draw and 0 points for losing.

== Division Two ==
Southern Football League Division Two
- Season: 1908–09
- Champions: Croydon Common
- Promoted: Croydon Common
- Relegated: Depot Battalion RE (resigned); 2nd Grenadier Guards (resigned)
- Matches: 42
- Goals: 214 (5.1 per match)

A total of seven teams contested the division, including three sides from the previous season and four newly elected teams.

Newly elected teams:

- 2nd Grenadier Guards
- Chesham Town
- Depot Battalion RE
- South Farnborough Athletic

Pos	Team	Pld	W	D	L	GF	GA	GR	Pts	Promotion or relegation
1	Croydon Common	12	10	0	2	67	14	4.786	20	Promoted to Division One
2	Hastings & St Leonards	12	8	1	3	42	18	2.333	17	
3	Depot Battalion RE	12	8	1	3	23	22	1.045	17	Left league at end of season
4	2nd Grenadier Guards	12	5	0	7	21	33	0.636	10	Left league at end of season
5	South Farnborough Athletic	12	2	4	6	20	39	0.513	8	
6	Salisbury City	12	3	1	8	24	36	0.667	7	
7	Chesham Town	12	2	1	9	17	52	0.327	5	

Rules for classification: The system of using goal average to separate two teams tied on points was used until the 1976-77 season. The points system: 2 points for a win, 1 point for a draw and 0 points for losing.
