= 1959–60 Rochdale A.F.C. season =

English football club season

Rochdale
1959–60 season
- Manager: Jack Marshall
- Stadium: Spotland Stadium
- Division 4: 12th
- F.A. Cup: 2nd Round
- Top goalscorer: League: Stanley Milburn; All: Stanley Milburn

The 1959–60 season was Rochdale A.F.C.'s 53rd in existence and their first in the Football League Fourth Division, following relegation the previous season.

== Statistics ==
No.	Pos	Nat	Player	Total		Division 4		F.A. Cup		Lancashire Cup	
No.	Pos	Nat	Player	Apps	Goals	Apps	Goals	Apps	Goals	Apps	Goals
	GK	(England) ENG	Jimmy Jones	31	0	26	0	4	0	1	0
	DF	(England) ENG	Stanley Milburn	45	15	41	15	4	0	0	0
	DF	(Wales) WAL	Dai Powell	40	0	35	0	4	0	1	0
	DF	(England) ENG	Norman Bodell	28	2	23	0	3	0	2	2
	DF	(England) ENG	Ray Aspden	29	0	27	0	0	0	2	0
	MF	(England) ENG	Alan Bushby	49	0	45	0	3	0	1	0
	MF	(England) ENG	Ron Barnes	52	7	46	6	4	1	2	0
	FW	(England) ENG	Ronnie Cairns	48	12	43	10	4	2	1	0
	FW	(England) ENG	Frank Lord	15	6	14	6	0	0	1	0
	FW	(Scotland) SCO	Johnny Anderson	33	6	28	5	4	1	1	0
	MF	(England) ENG	Tony Collins	38	5	34	4	3	1	1	0
	MF	(Scotland) SCO	Bert Thomson	34	1	31	1	2	0	1	0
	DF	(Wales) WAL	Jack Edwards	43	1	38	1	4	0	1	0
	FW	(England) ENG	George Cooper	18	7	17	7	0	0	1	0
	FW	(England) ENG	Les Spencer	38	10	32	9	4	1	2	0
	MF	(England) ENG	Jim Brown	7	2	6	1	1	1	0	0
	GK	(England) ENG	George Heyes	21	0	20	0	0	0	1	0
	DF	(Scotland) SCO	Jock Wallace	1	0	0	0	0	0	1	0
	DF	(England) ENG	Roy Anchor	1	0	0	0	0	0	1	0
	FW	(England) ENG	Bobby Entwistle	1	0	0	0	0	0	1	0

== Final League Table ==
Pos	Team	Pld	W	D	L	GF	GA	GAv	Pts
10	Stockport County	46	19	11	16	58	54	1.074	49
11	Bradford (Park Avenue)	46	17	15	14	70	68	1.029	49
12	Rochdale	46	18	10	18	65	60	1.083	46
13	Aldershot	46	18	9	19	77	74	1.041	45
14	Crewe Alexandra	46	18	9	19	79	88	0.898	45

Source: rsssf.com

== Competitions ==
=== Football League Fourth Division ===
22 August 1959 1	Southport	2–2	Rochdale	Southport
	Reeson 71'; Ashe 75' (pen.)	Report	Lord 4'; Milburn 60' (pen.)	Stadium: Haig Avenue; Attendance: 5168; Referee: LJ Hamer

27 August 1959 2	Rochdale	1–0	Gillingham	Rochdale
	Cairns 4'	Report		Stadium: Spotland Stadium; Attendance: 6382

29 August 1959 3	Rochdale	0–1	Millwall	Rochdale
		Report	Broadfoot 35'	Stadium: Spotland Stadium; Attendance: 6474

3 September 1959 4	Gillingham	2–0	Rochdale	Gillingham
	Bacon; Moore	Report		Stadium: Priestfield Stadium; Attendance: 5649

5 September 1959 5	Torquay United	1–1	Rochdale	Torquay
	Baxter 19' (pen.)	Report	Spencer 34'	Stadium: Plainmoor; Attendance: 7369

8 September 1959 6	Rochdale	2–0	Darlington	Rochdale
	Spencer; Cooper	Report		Stadium: Spotland Stadium; Attendance: 5135

12 September 1959 7	Rochdale	2–2	Northampton Town	Rochdale
	Milburn 18' (pen.); Thomson 87'	Report	Leck 1', 79'	Stadium: Spotland Stadium; Attendance: 5686; Referee: JH Hemingway

16 September 1959 8	Darlington	0–0	Rochdale	Darlington
		Report		Stadium: Feethams; Attendance: 4951; Referee: P Rhodes

19 September 1959 9	Doncaster Rovers	2–1	Rochdale	Doncaster
	Fernie 20'; Walker 75' (pen.)	Report	Cairns 8'	Stadium: Belle Vue; Attendance: 5066; Referee: AW Sparling

22 September 1959 10	Rochdale	4–1	Barrow	Rochdale
	Milburn 3', 39', 82' (pen.); Collins 64'	Report	Robertson 31'	Stadium: Spotland Stadium; Attendance: 5117; Referee: A Hawcroft

26 September 1959 11	Rochdale	1–1	Workington	Rochdale
	Milburn 75'	Report	Morrison 26'	Stadium: Spotland Stadium; Attendance: 5671; Referee: L Howarth

28 September 1959 12	Barrow	3–0	Rochdale	Barrow-in-Furness
	Murdoch 47', 80'; Robertson 64'	Report		Stadium: Holker Street; Attendance: 5368; Referee: W Crossley

3 October 1959 13	Rochdale	3–0	Carlisle United	Rochdale
	Milburn 55' (pen.); Cairns 80'; Barnes 89'	Report		Stadium: Spotland Stadium; Attendance: 4897; Referee: J Bellwood

5 October 1959 14	Gateshead	1–2	Rochdale	Gateshead
	Lumley 57'	Report	Cooper 53'; Milburn 75' (pen.)	Stadium: Redheugh Park; Attendance: 5804; Referee: M Dixon

10 October 1959 15	Walsall	4–2	Rochdale	Walsall
	Richards 32', 75'; Davies 39'; Billingham 72' (pen.)	Report	Cooper 5'; Milburn 88' (pen.)	Stadium: Fellows Park; Attendance: 8552; Referee: R Reddaway

13 October 1959 16	Rochdale	2–0	Gateshead	Rochdale
	Cooper 31'; Anderson 79'	Report		Stadium: Spotland Stadium; Attendance: 4770; Referee: HP Hackney

17 October 1959 17	Rochdale	2–0	Hartlepools United	Rochdale
	Milburn 68' (pen.); Anderson 77'	Report		Stadium: Spotland Stadium; Attendance: 4856; Referee: RJ Leafe

24 October 1959 18	Crewe Alexandra	1–3	Rochdale	Crewe
	Kelly 64'	Report	Anderson 4'; Cooper 6', 63'	Stadium: Gresty Road; Attendance: 7617; Referee: Capt. C Dennis

31 October 1959 19	Rochdale	0–0	Chester	Rochdale
		Report		Stadium: Spotland Stadium; Attendance: 5643

7 November 1959 20	Crystal Palace	4–0	Rochdale	London
	Sexton 10'; Summersby 59' (pen.); Woan 71'; Byrne 82'	Report		Stadium: Selhurst Park; Attendance: 14946

21 November 1959 21	Stockport County	2–1	Rochdale	Stockport
	Guy 51'; Wallace 72'	Report	Spencer 49'	Stadium: Edgeley Park; Attendance: 7629; Referee: E Crawford

28 November 1959 22	Rochdale	3–0	Exeter City	Rochdale
	Cairns 27'; Spencer 50'; Collins 54'	Report		Stadium: Spotland Stadium; Attendance: 4856

12 December 1959 23	Rochdale	2–0	Oldham Athletic	Rochdale
	Cairns 15', 88'	Report		Stadium: Spotland Stadium; Attendance: 5317; Referee: A Holland

19 December 1959 24	Rochdale	1–0	Southport	Rochdale
	Cairns 7'	Report		Stadium: Spotland Stadium; Attendance: 2508

26 December 1959 25	Notts County	2–1	Rochdale	Nottingham
	Bircumshaw 43', 72'	Report	Cooper 6'	Stadium: Meadow Lane; Attendance: 14582

28 December 1959 26	Rochdale	1–4	Notts County	Rochdale
	Brown	Report	Forrest; Bircumshaw; Roby	Stadium: Spotland Stadium; Attendance: 4044

2 January 1960 27	Millwall	2–0	Rochdale	London
	Ackerman 47'; Pierce 84'	Report		Stadium: The Den; Attendance: 9862

9 January 1960 28	Aldershot	0–0	Rochdale	Aldershot
		Report		Stadium: Recreation Ground; Attendance: 3537

16 January 1960 29	Rochdale	4–2	Torquay United	Rochdale
	Milburn 18', 84'; Anderson 44'; Barnes 60'	Report	Baxter 33'; Pym 48'	Stadium: Spotland Stadium; Attendance: 3422

23 January 1960 30	Northampton Town	3–1	Rochdale	Northampton
	Kane 15'; Deakin 43'; Oláh 65'	Report	Milburn 62'	Stadium: County Ground; Attendance: 5355

6 February 1960 31	Rochdale	2–0	Doncaster Rovers	Rochdale
	Milburn 20'; Edwards 69'	Report		Stadium: Spotland Stadium; Attendance: 3740

13 February 1960 32	Workington	2–0	Rochdale	Workington
	Harburn 49'; McGarry 61'	Report		Stadium: Borough Park; Attendance: 2486

27 February 1960 33	Rochdale	0–2	Walsall	Rochdale
		Report	Richards 53'; Dudley 75'	Stadium: Spotland Stadium; Attendance: 4468

5 March 1960 34	Hartlepools United	0–1	Rochdale	Hartlepool
		Report	Anderson 49'	Stadium: Victoria Park; Attendance: 3286

12 March 1960 35	Rochdale	4–2	Crewe Alexandra	Rochdale
	Spencer 8'; Collins 30'; Milburn 58' (pen.); Barnes 86'	Report	Riley 43', 67'	Stadium: Spotland Stadium; Attendance: 3826

15 March 1960 36	Rochdale	0–1	Bradford Park Avenue	Rochdale
		Report	Reilly	Stadium: Spotland Stadium; Attendance: 3814

19 March 1960 37	Chester	2–1	Rochdale	Chester
	Pimlott 19', 81'	Report	Lord 4'	Stadium: Sealand Road; Attendance: 3965

26 March 1960 38	Rochdale	4–0	Crystal Palace	Rochdale
	Spencer 41'; Cairns 48'; Lord 78', 81'	Report		Stadium: Spotland Stadium; Attendance: 2562

29 March 1960 39	Carlisle United	1–1	Rochdale	Carlisle
	McMillan (pen.)	Report	Cairns	Stadium: Brunton Park; Attendance: 2258

2 April 1960 40	Bradford Park Avenue	0–0	Rochdale	Bradford
		Report		Stadium: Park Avenue; Attendance: 5955

9 April 1960 41	Rochdale	3–0	Stockport County	Rochdale
	Spencer 59'; Lord 67'; Barnes 74'	Report		Stadium: Spotland Stadium; Attendance: 3422

16 April 1960 42	Exeter City	4–1	Rochdale	Exeter
	Rees 3', 15'; Wilkinson 60'; Micklewright 63'	Report	Barnes	Stadium: St James Park; Attendance: 6419

18 April 1960 43	Rochdale	2–0	Aldershot	Rochdale
	Barnes; Cairns	Report		Stadium: Spotland Stadium; Attendance: 4301

23 April 1960 44	Rochdale	3–3	Watford	Rochdale
	Spencer 52'; Lord 82'; Collins 87'	Report	Uphill 16' (pen.), 85' (pen.); Walker 35'	Stadium: Spotland Stadium; Attendance: 4371

26 April 1960 45	Watford	2–1	Rochdale	Watford
	Uphill; Holton	Report	Spencer	Stadium: Vicarage Road; Attendance: 17774

30 April 1960 46	Oldham Athletic	1–0	Rochdale	Oldham
	Birch 5'	Report		Stadium: Boundary Park; Attendance: 5199

=== F.A. Cup ===
14 November 1959 1	Rochdale	2–2	Carlisle United	Rochdale
	Cairns 50'; Collins 55'	Report	McGill 80'; Walker 81'	Stadium: Spotland Stadium; Attendance: 5811

17 November 1959 1	Carlisle United	1–3 (a.e.t.)	Rochdale	Carlisle
	Devlin 28'	Report	Brown 83'; Cairns 104'; Barnes 113'	Stadium: Brunton Park; Attendance: 10000

5 December 1959 2	Rochdale	1–1	Bradford City	Rochdale
	Spencer 57'	Report	Stokes 30'	Stadium: Spotland Stadium; Attendance: 11828; Referee: NN Hough

9 December 1959 2	Bradford City	2–1	Rochdale	Bradford
	Stokes	Report	Anderson	Stadium: Valley Parade; Attendance: 16435

=== Lancashire Cup ===
28 October 1959	Accrington Stanley	0–1	Rochdale	Accrington
			Bodell	Stadium: Peel Park

9 February 1960	Preston North End	2–1	Rochdale	Preston
	Goal		Bodell	Stadium: Deepdale
