= 1952–53 Northampton Town F.C. season =

Northampton Town
1952–53 season
- Chairman: E.C. Hawtin
- Manager: Bob Dennison
- Stadium: County Ground
- Division Three (S): 3rd
- FA Cup: Second round
- Top goalscorer: League: Willie O'Donnell (27); All: Willie O'Donnell (27)
- Highest home attendance: 19,242 vs Reading
- Lowest home attendance: 6,100 vs Hendon
- Average home league attendance: 12,031

The 1952–53 season was Northampton Town's 56th season in their history and the twenty-fifth successive season in the regional Third Division South. Alongside competing in Division Three South, the club also participated in the FA Cup.

== Players ==
As of match played 30 April 1953.

Name	Position	Nat.	Place of Birth	Date of Birth (Age)	Apps	Goals	Previous club	Date signed	Fee
Goalkeepers
Alf Wood	GK	(England)	Aldridge	14 May 1915 (aged 37)	63	0	Coventry City	Summer 1951	£2,100
Full backs
Ron Patterson	LB	(England)	Gateshead	30 October 1929 (aged 23)	49	0	Middlesbrough	Summer 1952	
Jack Southam	RB	(England)	Willenhall	19 August 1917 (aged 35)	104	1	Birmingham City	Summer 1949	
Half backs
Maurice Candlin	CH	(England)	Jarrow	11 November 1921 (aged 31)	152	2	Partick Thistle	Summer 1949	
Ben Collins	CH	(England)	Kislingbury	9 March 1928 (aged 25)	78	0	Apprentice	Summer 1948	N/A
John Croy	WH	(Scotland)	Falkirk	23 February 1925 (aged 28)	5	0	Third Lanark	Summer 1951	
James Davie	WH	(Scotland)	Cambuslang	7 September 1922 (aged 30)	76	1	Preston North End	Summer 1950	
Norman Dodgin	WH	(England)	Gateshead	1 November 1921 (aged 31)	19	1	Reading	Summer 1951	
Gwyn Hughes	WH	(Wales)	Blaenau Ffestiniog	7 May 1922 (aged 30)	140	15	Blaenau Ffestiniog Amateur	Summer 1946	
Tom McLain	WH	(England)	Morpeth	19 January 1922 (aged 31)	35	2	Sunderland	Summer 1952	
John Smith	WH	(England)	Leicester	4 September 1928 (aged 24)	10	1	Apprentice	Summer 1950	N/A
Frank Upton	WH	(England)	Atherstone	18 October 1934 (aged 18)	4	0	Nuneaton Borough	Summer 1952	
Inside/Outside forwards
Jack English	OF	(England)	South Shields	19 March 1923 (aged 30)	151	64	Apprentice	Summer 1947	N/A
Tommy Fowler	OF	(England)	Prescot	16 December 1924 (aged 28)	200	40	Everton	Summer 1946	
Felix Staroscik	OF	(Poland)	Silesia	20 May 1920 (aged 32)	25	7	Third Lanark	Summer 1951	
Don Adams	IF	(England)	Northampton	15 February 1931 (aged 22)	9	4	Apprentice	Summer 1951	N/A
Larry Baxter	IF	(England)	Leicester	24 November 1931 (aged 21)	11	2	Apprentice	Summer 1952	N/A
Maurice Edelston	IF	(England)	Kingston upon Hull	27 April 1918 (aged 35)	33	15	Reading	Summer 1952	
Ken Leek	IF	(Wales)	Ynysybwl	26 July 1935 (aged 17)	0	0	Apprentice	Summer 1952	N/A
Fred Ramscar	IF	(England)	Salford	24 January 1919 (aged 34)	95	47	Preston North End	Summer 1951	
Centre forwards
Willie O'Donnell	CF	(Scotland)	Clydebank	9 August 1924 (aged 28)	71	37	Partick Thistle	Summer 1951	

== Competitions ==
=== Division Three South ===
==== League table ====
Pos	Team	Pld	W	D	L	GF	GA	GAv	Pts	Qualification or relegation
1	Bristol Rovers	46	26	12	8	92	46	2.000	64	Division Champions, promoted
2	Millwall	46	24	14	8	82	44	1.864	62	
3	Northampton Town	46	26	10	10	109	70	1.557	62	
4	Norwich City	46	25	10	11	99	55	1.800	60	
5	Bristol City	46	22	15	9	95	61	1.557	59	

==== Results summary ====
Overall								Home						Away					
Pld	W	D	L	GF	GA	GAv	Pts	W	D	L	GF	GA	Pts	W	D	L	GF	GA	Pts
46	26	10	10	109	70	1.557	62	18	4	1	75	30	40	8	6	9	34	40	22

Last updated: 20 May 2020.

==== League position by match ====
Round	1	2	3	4	5	6	7	8	9	10	11	12	13	14	15	16	17	18	19	20	21	22	23	24	25	26	27	28	29	30	31	32	33	34	35	36	37	38	39	40	41	42	43	44	45	46
Ground	A	A	H	H	A	H	H	A	A	H	H	A	A	H	A	H	A	H	A	A	A	H	H	A	A	H	A	H	H	A	H	A	H	A	H	A	H	A	H	A	A	H	H	H	A	H
Result	W	L	W	W	L	W	W	D	L	W	W	L	W	D	W	W	W	W	D	L	W	W	W	L	W	W	D	W	W	L	L	D	D	D	W	W	W	D	W	L	L	W	W	D	W	D
Position	10	13	10	7	12	7	4	3	10	6	4	6	2	4	2	2	2	2	3	3	2	2	2	4	2	2	3	2	2	2	3	3	3	4	3	3	4	3	2	3	3	2	2	2	2	3

Source: 11v11.com
A = Away; H = Home; W = Win; D = Draw; L = Loss

==== Matches ====
Win Draw Loss

23 August 1952 1	Bournemouth & Boscombe Athletic	0–1	Northampton Town	Bournemouth
15:00 BST			J.English	Stadium: Dean Court; Attendance: 14,771

27 August 1952 2	Exeter City	2–0	Northampton Town	Exeter
BST				Stadium: St James Park; Attendance: 12,729

30 August 1952 3	Northampton Town	4–3	Southend United	Northampton
BST	T.Fowler; F.Ramscar			Stadium: County Ground; Attendance: 13,611

4 September 1952 4	Northampton Town	3–1	Exeter City	Northampton
BST	M.Edelston; W.O'Donnell; F.Ramscar			Stadium: County Ground; Attendance: 11,988

6 September 1952 5	Watford	2–1	Northampton Town	Watford
15:15 BST			J.English	Stadium: Vicarage Road; Attendance: 21,959

11 September 1952 6	Northampton Town	3–1	Coventry City	Northampton
BST	M.Edelston; J.English; W.O'Donnell			Stadium: County Ground; Attendance: 13,280

13 September 1952 7	Northampton Town	5–3	Brighton & Hove Albion	Northampton
BST	M.Edelston; W.O'Donnell			Stadium: County Ground; Attendance: 14,342

15 September 1952 8	Coventry City	1–1	Northampton Town	Coventry
17:55 BST			F.Ramscar	Stadium: Highfield Road; Attendance: 18,217

20 September 1952 9	Newport County	4–1	Northampton Town	Newport, Wales
BST			W.O'Donnell	Stadium: Somerton Park; Attendance: 10,479

25 September 1952 10	Northampton Town	3–1	Swindon Town	Northampton
BST	M.Edelston; T.Fowler			Stadium: County Ground; Attendance: 8,746

27 September 1952 11	Northampton Town	5–1	Crystal Palace	Northampton
BST	J.English; T.Fowler; M.Edelston; J.Southam			Stadium: County Ground; Attendance: 12,805

1 October 1952 12	Torquay United	3–0	Northampton Town	Torquay
BST				Stadium: Plainmoor; Attendance: 4,784

4 October 1952 13	Bristol City	2–3	Northampton Town	Bristol
15:15 BST			J.English; W.O'Donnell o.g.'	Stadium: Ashton Gate; Attendance: 21,795

11 October 1952 14	Northampton Town	2–2	Bristol Rovers	Northampton
BST	J.English; T.McLain			Stadium: County Ground; Attendance: 19,064

18 October 1952 15	Millwall	1–2	Northampton Town	Millwall, London
BST			J.English; F.Ramscar	Stadium: The Old Den; Attendance: 22,948

25 October 1952 16	Northampton Town	3–1	Gillingham	Northampton
BST	M.Edelston; J.English; F.Ramscar			Stadium: County Ground; Attendance: 13,689

1 November 1952 17	Walsall	1–5	Northampton Town	Walsall
GMT			M.Edelston; J.English; W.O'Donnell	Stadium: Fellows Park; Attendance: 8,420

8 November 1952 18	Northampton Town	3–1	Shrewsbury Town	Northampton
GMT	M.Edelston; J.English			Stadium: County Ground; Attendance: 13,988

15 November 1952 19	Queens Park Rangers	2–2	Northampton Town	White City, London
14:30 GMT			M.Edelston; W.O'Donnell	Stadium: Loftus Road; Attendance: 14,661

29 November 1952 20	Aldershot	2–1	Northampton Town	Aldershot
GMT			T.Fowler	Stadium: Recreation Ground; Attendance: 3,263

13 December 1952 21	Norwich City	1–2	Northampton Town	Norwich
GMT			J.English; T.McLain (red card)	Stadium: Carrow Road; Attendance: 21,093

20 December 1952 22	Northampton Town	5–1	Bournemouth & Boscombe Athletic	Northampton
GMT	W.O'Donnell; F.Ramscar			Stadium: County Ground; Attendance: 8,649

26 December 1952 23	Northampton Town	6–1	Reading	Northampton
GMT	M.Edelston; J.English; W.O'Donnell; F.Ramscar			Stadium: County Ground; Attendance: 19,242

3 January 1953 24	Southend United	3–1	Northampton Town	Southend-on-Sea
14:30 GMT			W.O'Donnell	Stadium: Roots Hall; Attendance: 7,425

10 January 1953 25	Orient	0–1	Northampton Town	Leyton, London
14:30 GMT			J.English	Stadium: Brisbane Road; Attendance: 7,826

17 January 1953 26	Northampton Town	4–1	Watford	Northampton
GMT	M.Edelston; J.English; W.O'Donnell			Stadium: County Ground; Attendance: 13,250

24 January 1953 27	Brighton & Hove Albion	1–1	Northampton Town	Hove
14:45 GMT			F.Staroscik	Stadium: Goldstone Ground; Attendance: 18,750

31 January 1953 28	Northampton Town	3–1	Orient	Northampton
GMT	T.Fowler; F.Ramscar			Stadium: County Ground; Attendance: 9,868

7 February 1953 29	Northampton Town	5–0	Newport County	Northampton
GMT	M.Edelston; J.English; F.Ramscar			Stadium: County Ground; Attendance: 11,977

14 February 1953 30	Crystal Palace	4–3	Northampton Town	Selhurst, London
GMT			D.Adams; W.O'Donnell	Stadium: Selhurst Park; Attendance: 6,409

21 February 1953 31	Northampton Town	0–2	Bristol City	Northampton
GMT				Stadium: County Ground; Attendance: 15,291

28 February 1953 32	Bristol Rovers	1–1	Northampton Town	Bristol
GMT			F.Ramscar	Stadium: Eastville Stadium; Attendance: 31,115

7 March 1953 33	Northampton Town	1–1	Millwall	Northampton
GMT	W.O'Donnell			Stadium: County Ground; Attendance: 13,687

14 March 1953 34	Gillingham	1–1	Northampton Town	Gillingham
15:15 GMT			F.Ramscar	Stadium: Priestfield Stadium; Attendance: 10,250

21 March 1953 35	Northampton Town	2–1	Walsall	Northampton
GMT	W.O'Donnell; F.Ramscar			Stadium: County Ground; Attendance: 9,717

28 March 1953 36	Shrewsbury Town	2–4	Northampton Town	Shrewsbury
GMT			J.English; W.O'Donnell; F.Ramscar	Stadium: Gay Meadow; Attendance: 7,329

4 April 1953 37	Northampton Town	4–2	Queens Park Rangers	Northampton
GMT	L.Baxter; N.Dodgin; J.English; T.Fowler			Stadium: County Ground; Attendance: 12,546

6 April 1953 38	Ipswich Town	1–1	Northampton Town	Ipswich
15:00 GMT			F.Ramscar	Stadium: Portman Road; Attendance: 12,048

7 April 1953 39	Northampton Town	2–0	Ipswich Town	Northampton
19:30 GMT	T.Fowler; T.McLain			Stadium: County Ground; Attendance: 12,307

11 April 1953 40	Swindon Town	3–0	Northampton Town	Swindon
GMT	B.Millar 18'; J.Bain 41' (pen.); M.Owen 59'	Report		Stadium: Swindon; Attendance: 9,564; Referee: S M Rogers

13 April 1953 41	Reading	2–0	Northampton Town	Reading
GMT				Stadium: Elm Park; Attendance: 9,020

16 April 1953 42	Northampton Town	2–0	Colchester United	Northampton
17:40 GMT	W.O'Donnell			Stadium: County Ground; Attendance: 7,982

18 April 1953 43	Northampton Town	4–0	Aldershot	Northampton
15:00 GMT	G.Hughes; W.O'Donnell; F.Ramscar			Stadium: County Ground; Attendance: 10,040; Referee: W Everett

23 April 1953 44	Northampton Town	3–3	Torquay United	Northampton
18:15 BST	J.English; T.Fowler; W.O'Donnell			Stadium: County Ground; Attendance: 11,510; Referee: W Clapton

25 April 1953 45	Colchester United	1–2	Northampton Town	Colchester
BST			J.English; T.Fowler	Stadium: Layer Road; Attendance: 8,122

30 April 1953 46	Northampton Town	3–3	Norwich City	Northampton
18:30 BST	L.Baxter; J.English; T.Fowler			Stadium: County Ground; Attendance: 9,555; Referee: T Martin

=== FA Cup ===
22 November 1952 First round	Hendon	0–0	Northampton Town	Cricklewood, London
14:15 GMT				Stadium: Claremont Road; Attendance: 9,000

27 November 1952 First round (r)	Northampton Town	2–0	Hendon	Northampton
GMT	T.Fowler; F.Ramscar			Stadium: County Ground; Attendance: 6,100

6 December 1952 Second round	Swindon Town	2–0	Northampton Town	Swindon
GMT	M.Owen 40'; B.Millar 88'	Report		Stadium: County Ground; Attendance: 12,936; Referee: F. Read

=== Appearances and goals ===
Pos	Player	Division Three (S)		FA Cup		Total	
Pos	Player	Starts	Goals	Starts	Goals	Starts	Goals
GK	Alf Wood	46	–	3	–	49	–
FB	Ron Patterson	46	–	3	–	49	–
FB	Jack Southam	46	1	3	–	49	1
HB	Maurice Candlin	28	–	3	–	31	–
HB	Ben Collins	19	–	–	–	19	–
HB	John Croy	2	–	–	–	2	–
HB	James Davie	11	–	–	–	11	–
HB	Norman Dodgin	14	1	–	–	14	1
HB	Gwyn Hughes	29	1	3	–	32	1
HB	Tom McLain	32	2	3	–	35	2
HB	John Smith	–	–	–	–	–	–
HB	Frank Upton	4	–	–	–	4	–
OF	Jack English	45	24	3	–	48	24
OF	Tommy Fowler	46	11	3	1	49	12
OF	Felix Staroscik	1	1	–	–	1	1
IF	Don Adams	2	1	–	–	2	1
IF	Larry Baxter	11	2	–	–	11	2
IF	Maurice Edelston	30	15	3	–	33	15
IF	Fred Ramscar	45	22	3	1	48	23
IF	Ken Leek	–	–	–	–	–	–
CF	Willie O'Donnell	46	27	3	–	49	27
Players who left before end of season:
IF	Tommy Mulgrew	3	–	–	–	3	–
