= Croy =

Croy may refer to:

Places

- in Scotland
  - Croy, Highland, Scotland
  - Croy Hill, The Roman fort on the Antonine Wall, Scotland
  - Croy, North Lanarkshire, Scotland
    - Croy Line, a railway line linking Glasgow and Croy, North Lanarkshire
    - Croy railway station, North Lanarkshire
  - Croy, South Ayrshire, Scotland
- in the rest of the world
  - Croy, Switzerland, a municipality in the Canton of Vaud
  - Croy Castle in the municipality Laarbeek, the Netherlands

People

- Noble House of Croÿ, an important old family from Belgium
- Anne Croy, Canadian reproductive immunologist
- Homer Croy (1883–1965), American author and screenwriter
- John Croy (1925–1979), Scottish footballer
- Jürgen Croy (born 1946), former football goalkeeper for East Germany
- Martyn Croy (born 1974), New Zealand former cricketer
- Ricardo Croy (born 1986), South African rugby union player

== See also ==
- Gordon Campbell, Baron Campbell of Croy (1921–2005), Scottish Conservative and Unionist politician.
- LeCroy Corporation, an American manufacturer of oscilloscopes, protocol analyzers and other test equipment
- Matthew LeCroy (born 1975), American former MLB player
