= Bernard Harrison (sportsman) =

English cricketer and footballer (1934-2006)

Personal information
- Full name: Bernard Reginald Stanhope Harrison
- Date of birth: 28 September 1934
- Place of birth: St John's, Worcestershire, England
- Date of death: 18 March 2006 (aged 71)
- Place of death: Basingstoke, Hampshire, England
- Position: Outside right

Senior career*
Years	Team	Apps	(Gls)
1952–1955	Portsmouth	0	(0)
1955–1959	Crystal Palace	92	(12)
1959–1960	Southampton	3	(0)
1960–1961	Exeter City	18	(4)
1961–1962	Poole Town		
1962–1963	Dorchester Town		
1963–1964	Andover		
- Portals Athletic
1968–????	Winchester City		
- Cricket career
Cricket information
- Batting: Right-handed
- Bowling: Right-arm medium
Domestic team information
- Years: Team
- 1957–1962: Hampshire
Career statistics
Competition	First-class
Matches	14
Runs scored	519
Batting average	23.59
100s/50s	1/2
Top score	110
Balls bowled	108
Wickets	1
Bowling average	65.00
5 wickets in innings	0
10 wickets in match	0
Best bowling	1/34
Catches/stumpings	8/–
- Source: ESPNcricinfo
- * Club domestic league appearances and goals

Bernard Reginald Stanhope Harrison (28 September 1934 – 18 March 2006) was an English sportsman who played first-class cricket for Hampshire and professional football as outside right with Crystal Palace, Southampton and Exeter City; for Crystal Palace, he would make over a hundred appearances. As a cricketer he was an opening batsman who was a member of the Hampshire side which won their first County Championship in 1961. He played for Hampshire between 1957 and 1962, though his appearances were limited by the presence of the opening pair of Jimmy Gray and Roy Marshall. After the conclusion of his sporting career, he became a schoolteacher and cricket statistician.

== Early life ==
The son of Reginald Stanhope Harrison, a one-time mayor of Andover, Harrison was born in St. John's in Worcester. He settled during his childhood in Basingstoke and was educated at Peter Symonds College in Winchester, where he was a keen all-round sportsman who excelled from an early age in both cricket and football. During his period of National Service he represented the British Army in both sports.

== Football career ==
=== Crystal Palace ===
An outside right, Harrison was an England schoolboy international who represented Hampshire Grammar Schools. In October 1952, he joined Portsmouth as a trainee, on amateur terms. Unable to break into the first team, he moved to Crystal Palace in October 1955. At Crystal Palace he was given a professional contract and made his first team debut in March 1956, as Palace finished second from bottom in the Third Division South and were forced to seek re-election to the Football League. During much of his first season at Palace, he was understudy to Mike Deakin, and would come into the starting eleven when Deakin was injured. In the 1956–57 season, Harrison became established in the side, normally at outside right with Johnny Byrne on the left, providing scoring opportunities for the front men, including Deakin at centre forward, with Peter Berry and Barry Pierce as the inside-forwards. Harrison himself contributed four goals, as Palace finished 20th. By the end of the season, he had attracted interest from a number of First Division teams. whilst Soccer Star predicted that, once Palace's fortunes improved, Harrison would become "one of the most talked about wingers in the game".

In the following season, George Cooper took over at centre forward, scoring 17 goals. Harrison contributed seven goals as Palace improved their league position, finishing 14th. Unfortunately, this was two places below the cut-off point for the re-organisation of the league structure, and Palace played in the newly created Fourth Division in 1958–59. During the 1957–58 season, he was selected to play in the Third Division South representative team in October 1957 at Selhurst Park. During the season, he drew comparisons from his manager Cyril Spiers, who opined that Harrison had the potential to become another Stanley Matthews or Tom Finney. Harrison only managed 14 league games in the 1958–59 season, having suffered poor form, with Ron Brett or Gerry Priestley being preferred. In the summer of 1959, Harrison left Crystal Palace having made exactly 100 first team appearances, 92 in the League and 8 in the FA Cup, scoring 12 goals (all in league matches).

=== Southampton ===
Having attracted interest from Crewe Alexandra amongst others, Harrison was recruited for Southampton, then in the Third Division, by manager Ted Bates as cover for Terry Paine. Paine's fitness was such, however, that he never missed a match in the one season that Harrison spent at The Dell. Harrison's three appearances for Southampton came in October, when Paine switched first to the left to replace the injured John Sydenham, and then to inside right in place of George O'Brien. Harrison's first and last matches were both against Barnsley. The second match was at home to Swindon Town when Derek Reeves scored four, with one from Paine, in a 5–1 victory on 10 October 1959. The Daily Echo reported that "Bernard Harrison (did) well on the right wing". Despite this, Harrison was unable to displace Paine and spent the rest of the season in the reserves. Remarking on Harrison's brief time at Southampton in his biography, Kevin Smallbone argued that he was "too talented for his own good", whilst Harrison himself said (in 2005) that "[I] was doing too many things, I didn't have time to train". Speaking to Paine's biographer, David Bull, Harrison commented that he "couldn't understand" why Ted Bates didn't switch Terry Paine to inside-left to accommodate him on the right. At the end of the season, Southampton were able to celebrate taking the Third Division title, whereas Harrison decided to leave.

=== Exeter City and after ===
At the end of the 1959–60 season, Harrison joined Exeter City for £350. where he spent one season, making 18 appearances in the Fourth Division scoring four goals. He had the distinction of playing in Exeter's inaugural League Cup fixture against Manchester United at St James Park. Following his single season at Exeter, he joined non-league Poole Town. He then played for a succession of non-league clubs, including signing for Dorchester Town in June 1962, before ending his career at Winchester City in the late 1960s.

== Cricket career ==
As a teenager, Harrison played for his native Worcestershire's Second Eleven. He joined Hampshire as a professional in April 1956, signing alongside Raymond Flood, Brian Robbins and Roy Stride. He made his debut in first-class cricket for Hampshire against Oxford University at Oxford. With Butch White and Raymond Pitman being left out of Hampshire's side for their 1958 County Championship fixture against Worcestershire at Portsmouth in May, Harrison was afforded his County Championship debut opening the batting alongside Roy Marshall. He played one further match against Oxford University in 1958, whilst in 1959 he made two first-class appearances, one of which came in the County Championship against Kent. Good form for the Hampshire Second Eleven led to Harrison being bought into the Hampshire squad for their County Championship match against Middlesex in August 1960, with Hampshire secretary Desmond Eagar justifing his selection by explaining that "Harrison has been near County Championship team grade for some time"; however, he did not make the starting eleven and would feature just once during the season, against Oxford University.

Prior to the 1961 season, Harrison was muted by Playfair alongside Danny Livingstone as "the county's best young batting prospects". A member of the team which won Hampshire's maiden County Championship title in 1961, he featured in just three matches during the season. In these, he deputisied for Marshall, who had twisted his knee, in two Championship matches against Warwickshire and Nottinghamshire in July. Between these matches, Harrison scored his maiden first-class century against Oxford University, making 110 runs, and sharing in a second wicket partnership of 119 runs with Mike Barnard. The following season, he made four appearances in the 1962 County Championship (deputising in three matches for Marshall in August, after he had been afflicted by German measels), and played once against Oxford University. Alongside Malcolm Heath, Harrison was not offered a contract by Hampshire ahead of the 1963 season, but would continue to play infrequently for the Hampshire Second Eleven until 1968.

Harrison spent most time at Hampshire playing in the Second Eleven as an opening batsman. He spent his time at Hampshire understudying Marshall and Jimmy Gray, who were considered to be the most reliable opening partnership in county cricket at the time. He made fourteen first-class appearances for Hampshire, six of which came against Oxford University. In his fourteen matches, he scored 519 runs at an average of 23.59. As a fielder, Harrison had a reputation for his speed when patrolling the boundary. Outside of the professional game, Harrison played the majority of his club cricket for Basingstoke & North Hants Cricket Club, where he also coached. He would later act as the Hampshire Second Eleven's statistician, responsible for archiving their statistical records.

== Personal life ==
Harrison later became a sports and mathematics teacher at Farleigh House school in Farleigh Wallop. He moved with the school to Red Rice near Andover when the school became Farleigh School. He also excelled at other sports, gaining county recognition in badminton and table tennis, and could also have done so in field hockey while at school, but football took preference. His biography Brushes with the Greats – The Story of a Footballer/Cricketer was published in 2001. Harrison was married to Doris Moyse, whom he had married at Croydon Minster in July 1952; she was the sister of the Crystal Palace footballer Alec Moyse. Harrison died in Basingstoke on 18 March 2006. He was subsequently cremated a fortnight after his death at Basingstoke Crematorium.

== Works cited ==
- Bull, David (2008). Constant Paine: From Southampton Legend to South African Ambassador. Bristol: Hagiology Publishing. ISBN 9780953447473.
- Holley, Duncan; Chalk, Gary (2003). In That Number – A Post-War Chronicle of Southampton FC. Bristol: Hagiology Publishing. ISBN 095344743X.
- Juson, Dave (2004). Saints v Pompey – A History of Unrelenting Rivalry. Bristol: Hagiology Publishing. ISBN 0953447456.
- Sandiford, Keith A. P. (2005). Roy Edwin Marshall: His Record Innings-by-Innings. Nottingham: ACS. ISBN 1905138156.
