= Bob Murdoch =

Bob, Bobby or Robert Murdoch may refer to:

- Bob Murdoch (ice hockey, born 1946) (1946–2023), Canadian ice hockey player (Montreal Canadiens, Los Angeles Kings) and head coach (Chicago Blackhawks, Winnipeg Jets)
- Bob Murdoch (ice hockey, born 1954), Canadian ice hockey player with the California Golden Seals, Cleveland Barons, and St. Louis Blues
- Bob Murdoch (Australian footballer) (1909–1965), Australian rules footballer
- Bobby Murdoch (1944–2001), Scottish international football player for Celtic and Middlesbrough
- Bobby Murdoch (footballer, born 1936) (1936–2017), English football player for Liverpool, Barrow, Stockport County, Carlisle United and Southport
- Robert C. Murdoch (1861–1923), malacologist in New Zealand
- Robin Murdoch (1911–1994), known as Bob Murdoch, Scottish athlete

== See also ==
- Rupert Murdoch (born 1931), international media magnate
