= Reeson =

Reeson is a surname. Notable people with the surname include:

- Margaret Reeson (born 1938), Australian historian and writer
- Sammy Reeson (born 1963), English boxer
- Tony Reeson (1933–1990), English footballer
- Joseph Newell Reeson (1868–1953), Australian civil engineer
- Warren Christopher Reeson (born 1966), English born Canadian muralist and artist.

== Forename ==
- Reece Shearsmith (born 1969), British actor, comedian and writer

== See also ==
- Reesor (disambiguation)
