= Alec Glen =

Scottish footballer

Personal information
- Full name: Alec Glen
- Place of birth: Scotland
- Position: Left half

Senior career*
| Years | Team | Apps | (Gls) |
- Kello Rovers
| 1955–1957 | Queen's Park | 48 | (4) |
| 1957–1958 | Dundee | 1 | (0) |
| 1958–1961 | Ayr United | 56 | (2) |

International career
| 1956–1957 | Scotland Amateurs | 3 | (0) |
- * Club domestic league appearances and goals

Alec Glen was a Scottish amateur football left half who played in the Scottish League for Ayr United, Queen's Park and Dundee. He was capped by Scotland at amateur level.
