= Sheik Brown =

Escaped convict in Australia (c. 1800 – c. 1840)

Sheik Brown (/ˈʃeɪk/ SHAYK; c. 1800 – c. 1840), nicknamed Jack Brown or Black Jack, was a convict of Indian heritage who escaped from custody in Australia at least five times.

Originally from the East Indies, by 1824 he was working in England as a servant. On 7 April, he was tried at the Middlesex Gaol Delivery for "stealing in a dwelling house, under the value of forty shillings". Brown was sentenced to transportation for life. On 29 April 1825, he arrived at Sydney on the ship Asia.

Another offence in February 1826 led to Brown being transferred to the Moreton Bay Penal Settlement (now Brisbane). The settlement's commandant, strict disciplinarian Patrick Logan, was notorious for his excessive use of the lash. Over the course of Logan's leadership, around 500 convicts would ultimately abscond from the settlement.

Brown arrived at the settlement on 2 June 1826 and escaped only five days later. He was on the run for eight days before he was captured.

His next escape was on 6 May 1828, and he was in the bush until 19 December – a little over six months. Around 1830 Brown made his third escape. He managed to evade authorities for two years. Brown spent time with fellow absconders and Aboriginal Australians, and lived with an Aboriginal group for some time. He surrendered in Port Macquarie on 29 August 1832.

After his fourth escape attempt, he pretended to be a shipwrecked sailor from Bombay named Jose Koondiana. He was eventually identified by a fellow inmate. Brown returned to the settlement on 25 May 1834. In 1837, he absconded from 16 January to 11 April.

The penal settlement closed in 1842, and Brown is mentioned to have died some years before 1847.

== See also ==
- John Caesar
- James Davis (escaped convict)
