= Jack Marshall (footballer, born 1917) =

English footballer and manager (1917–1998)

Personal information
- Full name: John Gilmore Marshall
- Date of birth: 29 May 1917
- Place of birth: Bolton, England
- Date of death: 6 January 1998 (aged 80)
- Place of death: Rotherham, England
- Position: Full-back

Senior career*
| Years | Team | Apps | (Gls) |
| 1936–1948 | Burnley | 26 | (0) |
| Total | | 26 | (0) |

Managerial career
- 1958–1960: Rochdale
- 1960–1967: Blackburn Rovers
- 1968–1969: Sheffield Wednesday
- 1969: Bury
- * Club domestic league appearances and goals

John Gilmore Marshall (29 May 1917 – 6 January 1998) was an English football player and coach, who played for Burnley, and managed Rochdale, Blackburn Rovers, Sheffield Wednesday and Bury.

== Playing career ==
Marshall was born in Bolton, Lancashire. He signed for Burnley in 1936, where he played as a full-back, but his career was cut short by injury and he retired in 1948.

== Managerial career ==
Marshall became a coach at Bury in 1949, and held coaching roles at Stoke City, Sheffield Wednesday and the England B team, prior to taking on his first managerial role with Third Division club Rochdale in October 1958. In his first season at the club, Dale finished bottom of the Third Division and were relegated. In the 1959–60 season, Rochdale finished 12th in the Fourth Division.

Marshall was appointed manager of First Division club Blackburn Rovers manager following the dismissal of Dally Duncan, after 6 matches as the 1960–61 season as Rochdale wished to first appoint a replacement manager. He was a popular manager at Blackburn with his side noted for their entertaining, attacking football. During his first two seasons in charge of the club, Marshall successfully changed multiple players' positions, leading to his team being nicknamed as "Marshall's Misfits"; full-back Fred Pickering became a centre-forward, Keith Newton was moved to full-back and Andy McEvoy became an inside forward, which, alongside new signings, provided the foundations for success at the club. By the 1963–64 season, Marshall's Rovers side appeared to be genuine title contenders, leading the First Division table on Boxing Day 1963, though the sale of Pickering to Everton in March 1964 destabilised the team and they eventually finished 7th. The club struggled following the 1963–64 season and were relegated in 1966, with Marshall remaining as manager on a week-to-week basis. The club appointed assistant Eddie Quigley in November 1966, who was given responsibility for coaching; Marshall resigned in February 1967, with Quigley appointed as his replacement.

He was appointed as assistant manager to Alan Brown at Sheffield Wednesday later in 1967 before taking over as manager when Brown left in February 1968. Marshall left Wednesday after the 1968–69 season, and took over as Bury manager shortly after, but was sacked after just 7 games for financial reasons. He became club physiotherapist at Blackburn in 1970, a role he held up until his retirement from football in 1979.

== Death ==
Marshall died at Rotherham General Hospital on 6 January 1998 following a short illness.
