= Alec Moyse =

English footballer

Personal information
- Date of birth: 5 August 1935
- Place of birth: Mitcham, England
- Date of death: 1994 (aged 58–59)
- Position: Forward

Senior career*
Years	Team	Apps	(Gls)
- Chatham Town
1955–1957	Crystal Palace	4	(1)
1958–1959	Swindon Town	4	(0)
1959–1960	Millwall	22	(2)
- Poole Town
- Chelmsford City
- Cambridge City
- Romford
- Haverhill Rovers
- * Club domestic league appearances and goals

Alec Moyse (5 August 1935 – 1994) was an English footballer who played as a forward in the Football League. His brother-in-law was the footballer and cricketer Bernard Harrison.
