= James Davis (escaped convict) =

Scottish-Australian convict (1807–1889)

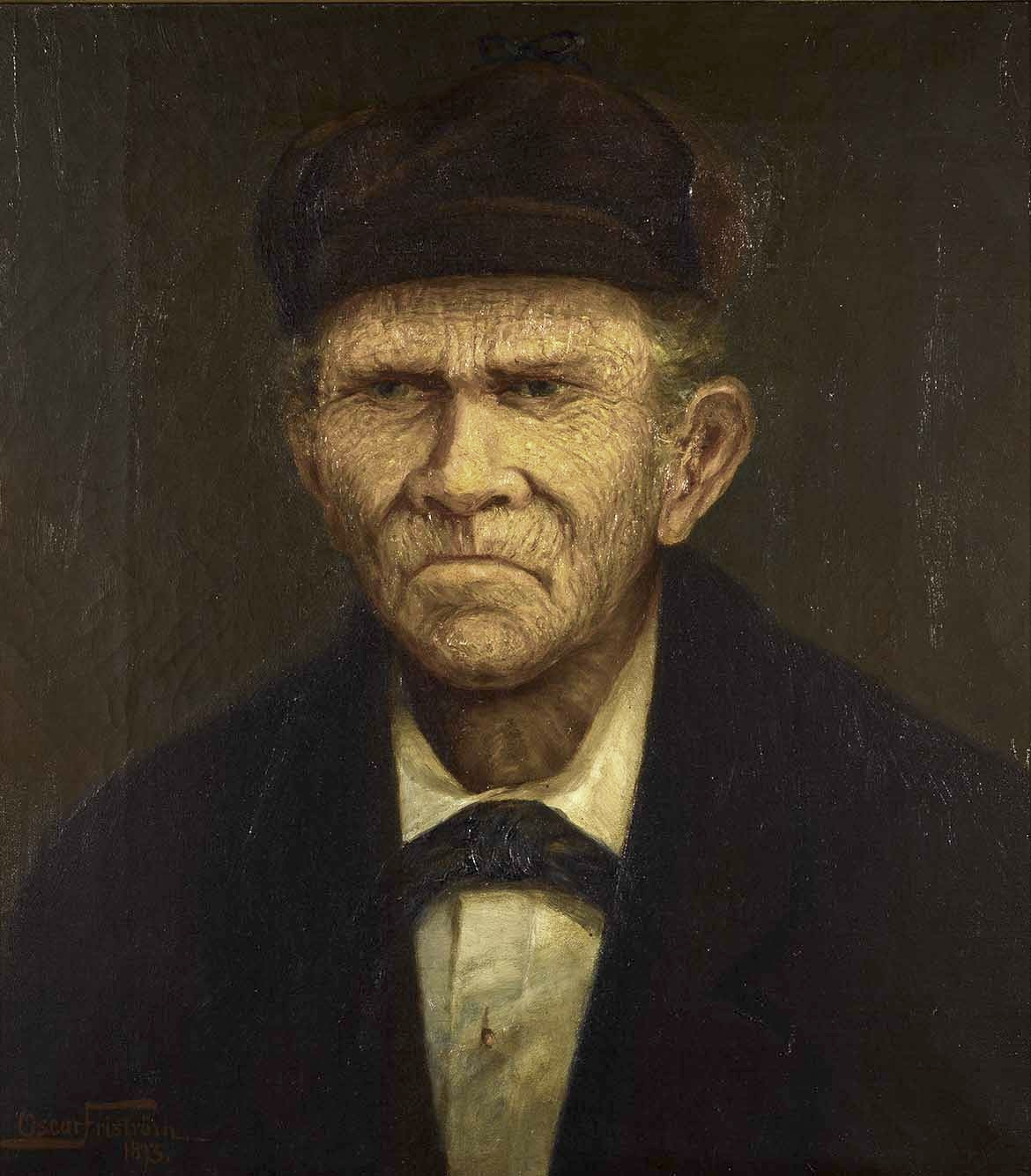
- Duramboi (1893) by Oscar Fristrom
- Born: Glasgow, Scotland
- Baptised: 2 August 1807
- Died: 7 May 1889 (aged 81); Brisbane, Colony of Queensland, Australia
- Burial place: Toowong Cemetery, Queensland
- Other names: Duramboi; John James Davis
- Occupations: Blacksmith; Shopkeeper
- Spouses: Annie Shea (m. 1846; died 1882); Bridget Hayes (m. 1883)
- Partner: Caleeraba

James Davis (also known as Duramboi; (Note: Also spelt Darumboy, Durramboi, Durrumboi, Derhamboi, Tharumboi, Thurimby and Durham Boy.) baptised 2 August 1807 – 7 May 1889) was a Scottish-born convict notable for escaping custody in Australia and living with Aboriginal people for thirteen years.

Convicted in Glasgow in 1824, he was transported on the Minstrel to New South Wales, arriving the following year. Following a further infraction, Davis was relocated to Moreton Bay penal settlement, but the cruel leadership of commandant Patrick Logan motivated Davis and another prisoner to escape into the bush. The two men came in contact with the Kabi Kabi people of Wide Bay. Davis's companion was killed by the Kabi Kabi, but Davis was welcomed as Duramboi, the reincarnated son of tribal leader Pamby-Pamby.

Davis assimilated into the native culture and lived as a Kabi Kabi man, partaking in traditional scarification and possibly cannibalism. He was located by explorer Andrew Petrie in 1842. Davis subsequently rejoined Western society and worked as a blacksmith, shopkeeper and Aboriginal interpreter. He died in 1889; his wife Bridget was charged with manslaughter and acquitted.

== Early life and education ==
James Davis was born in Glasgow, Scotland, to blacksmith Walter Davis and his wife Mary McGrigor. On 2 August 1807, he was christened in Strathblane. He grew up in Broomielaw, and at 14 he was apprenticed as a blacksmith to his father at the Old Wynd.

== Conviction ==
On 29 September 1824 in Glasgow, James Davis was sentenced to fourteen years' transportation. He had pleaded guilty to "the offence of theft, habit and repute". According to writer Wargandilla, Davis himself later gave two conflicting stories of his conviction: "One was [for] appropriating half a crown from a church plate, and the other was for a crime of which he was quite innocent". According to the Australian Dictionary of Biography, Davis was convicted for stealing 2 shillings 6 pence (half a crown) from a church box.

In late October, he was one of 11 male prisoners received at Calton Hill Gaol in Edinburgh.

The eleven convicts belonging to Glasgow, before leaving the prison, were each presented with a pocket Bible, a collection of Tracts, and a catechism, neatly stitched. The delivery of the Bibles and Tracts was prefaced by a most impressive and feeling address from the Rev. James Morrison, chaplain of the prison.

— The Edinburgh Advertiser, 9 November 1824

Davis arrived in New South Wales on the Minstrel on 22 August 1825. Upon his arrival, he was described as a 17-year-old Glaswegian cattle boy with blond hair.

He is not to be confused with James Davis of Surrey, who arrived on the ship Norfolk on 18 August 1825. (Note: John Dunmore Lang states that Davis travelled on the Minstrel.)

== In Australia ==
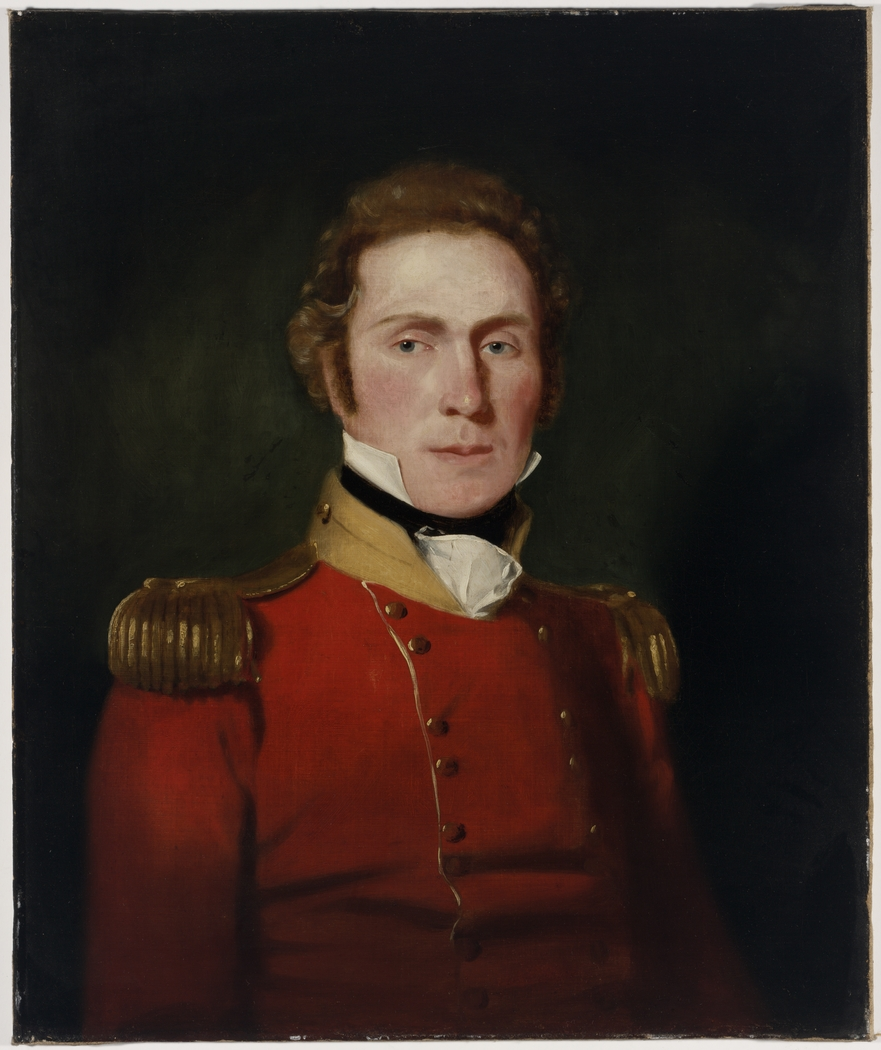
Commandant Patrick Logan

In 1828 Davis was tried for robbery at Patrick's Plains and was sentenced to three years' imprisonment at the Moreton Bay penal settlement (now Brisbane, Queensland). Davis was sent to the penal settlement on 6 February 1829, arriving there on the 18th. The settlement's commandant, strict disciplinarian Patrick Logan, was notorious for his excessive use of the lash. Indeed, Logan's punishments were so extreme that certain convicts at the settlement committed murder with the intention of getting themselves hanged; preferring death to further lashing. Around 500 convicts would ultimately abscond from Moreton Bay.

== As "Duramboi" ==
=== Assimilation into Aboriginal culture ===
On 30 March 1829, Davis escaped northward with a companion, possibly convict John Downie. Apparently neither of the men had suffered punishment; it has been suggested that either the fear of being murdered or possible future lashings is what led them to abscond.

The duo first came across Aboriginal people when they reached Sandgate—possibly the Doomgalbarah people—whom they stayed with for 12 months. The tribe passed them along to Toorbul Point, then to the Mary River, to see if anyone would recognise the white convicts as reincarnated Aboriginal men. The convicts soon joined the Kabi Kabi people (then called the Ginginbarrah people) of Wide Bay. (Note: QAGOMA believe they were the Badtjala people.) The Kabi Kabi leader Pamby-Pamby believed Davis was his reincarnated dead son Duramboi, and accepted him into the tribe as "an honoured guest". (Note: The writer Wargandilla stated that "Duramboi" meant "little", and that Davis was given the name due to his small stature. Henry Stuart Russell stated that the name meant "kangaroo rat", and was an emblem of activity and speed.) Not long after, Davis's companion broke tribal law by desecrating an Aboriginal grave—removing the deceased's remains from a dilly bag in a tree in order to carry oysters—and was killed.

Shortly after, Davis accidentally killed his adoptive mother's pet dog. The woman persuaded Pamby-Pamby to kill Davis. At first Pamby-Pamby was not indisposed to do so. He accused Davis of being not his son but a "mawgooy" (ghost), and threatened to have him killed. In response, Davis gave Pamby-Pamby "such a merciless drubbing with his fists that he not only subdued his murderous intentions but induced him to forgive the death of his pet dog". Davis was "a specially dutiful son ever afterwards".

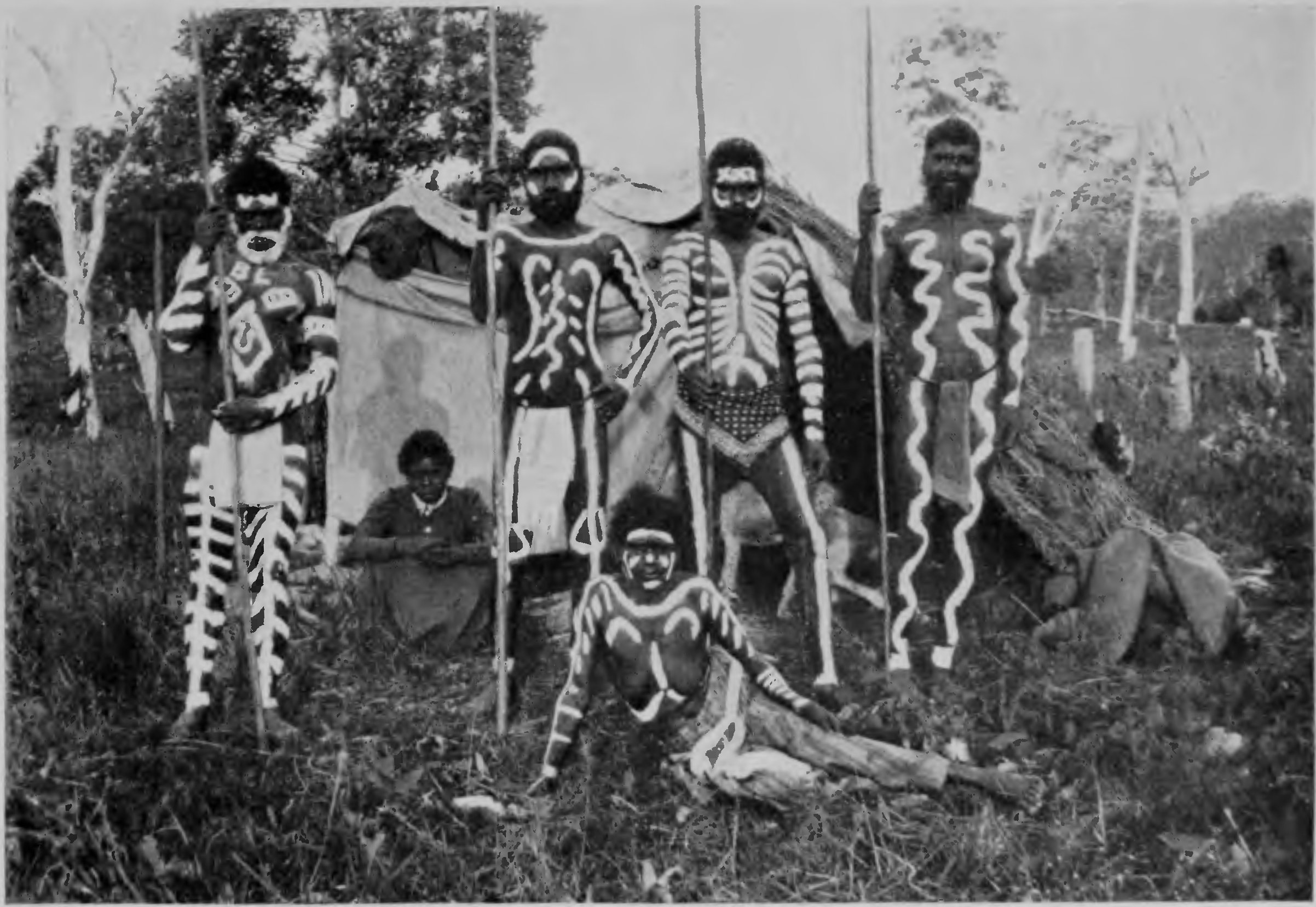
Members of the Kabi Kabi tribe

Davis stayed with the Kabi Kabi for 12 months. He eventually travelled hundreds of miles from Brisbane and learned the languages and customs of many tribes. All of these tribes treated him as a reincarnated Aboriginal man. For each tribe, Davis would assume the identity of a recently deceased tribesman, but over time these lies became increasingly difficult to maintain. On the occasions that Davis was not "recognised", he would claim he had forgotten his name after his "death". By 1842, he had settled back with the Kabi Kabi people and his adoptive father Pamby-Pamby. He was allotted a flat named Toon about eight miles (13 km) off the Mary River.

Davis completely adopted the habits of his newfound culture. He dressed in little clothing and could navigate the bush as easily as his colleagues. He also partook in traditional scarification. By 1842, Davis's chest was tattooed with parallel horizontal scars, and he had scars of old wounds in his back and legs.

In 1879, an Aboriginal man from Pialba claimed that Davis was susceptible to cannibalism.

=== Location by Andrew Petrie ===
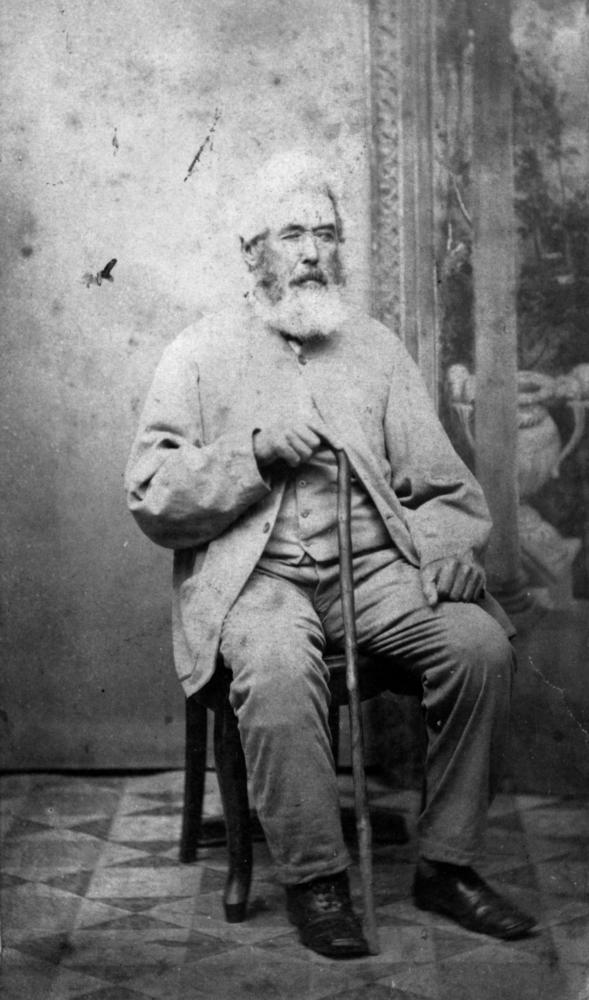
Explorer and tradesman Andrew Petrie located Davis in 1842.

On 12/13 May 1842, Davis was found by tradesman and explorer Andrew Petrie in Wide Bay, amongst the Kabi Kabi tribe. Petrie's party was travelling northwards from Brisbane. They had recently located another convict escapee named David Bracewell (known as Wandi) in Noosa, who had spent seven years among the Aboriginal people. Petrie had heard from Aboriginal people on Fraser Island that another white man was living in the bush. The historian Henry Stuart Russell was one of the men in Petrie's party.

Petrie and his party planned to bring Davis back to Western society. Bracewell and an Aboriginal man from Moreton Bay managed to sneak into the Kabi Kabi encampment unnoticed. Then two of Petrie's men, armed with guns, went towards the encampment to secure Davis. The operation was so risky that the men were promised improved conditions if successful. The Kabi Kabi people were vengeful of the party of Western men, as over fifty Kabi Kabi had recently suffered from a mass poisoning in Kilcoy.

Bracewell and the Moreton Bay native were recognised and received by the Kabi Kabi. The two convicts were spotted from a distance, prompting the natives to prepare to spear them. Bracewell and Davis communicated and managed to convince the Kabi Kabi to spare the two convicts.

Petrie persuaded Davis to accept that it was safe to return to Brisbane with the cessation of transportation. Once assured of his freedom, Davis ran towards the convicts and surrendered. Davis accused Bracewell of betraying him to mitigate his own sentence. Bracewell, enraged, began singing a war song, causing Davis to rush off towards Petrie's party. Finally Davis became calm and agreed to leave with Petrie next day.

The next morning, Davis boarded the whale boat and left with the party. According to Wargandilla, "blacks in hundreds followed along the bank of the river, walked out on projecting trees and rocks and called their farewells to Davis, who ... told them the awful sorrow he felt at leaving them, the joyous days he had spent in their company, his undying love for his father and mother, and all the other superb exaggerations made necessary in the diplomacy of that critical occasion".

I shall never forget his appearance when he arrived in our camp – a white man in a state of nudity, and actually a wild man of the woods; his eyes wild and unable to rest a moment on any one object. He had quite the same manner and gestures that the wildest blacks have got. He could not speak his 'mither's tongue,' as he called it. He could not pronounce English for some time, and when he did attempt it, all he could say was a few words, and those were often misapplied, breaking off abruptly in the middle of a sentence with the black gibberish, which he spoke very fluently. During the whole of our conversation his eyes and manner were completely wild, looking at us as if he had never seen a white man before. In fact, he told us he had forgotten all about the society of white men, and had forgotten all about his friends and relations for years past, and had I or someone else not brought him from among those savages he would never have left them.

— Andrew Petrie's diary

Though Davis could speak up to five Aboriginal languages, he had forgotten the English language, and "could only tell his name and place". Petrie and his group were the first white people Davis had seen since he had encountered Bracewell around 1832.

According to a contemporary report by The Australian, Davis "was naked, besmeared and cut the same as the natives. He is equally as expert in climbing a tree, [etc], as they are. Both [Davis and Bracewell] can give much information to the Government, and as they have been the means of saving the lives of Mr. Petrie and party, I doubt not but they will receive their free pardons."

== Reintegration with Western society ==
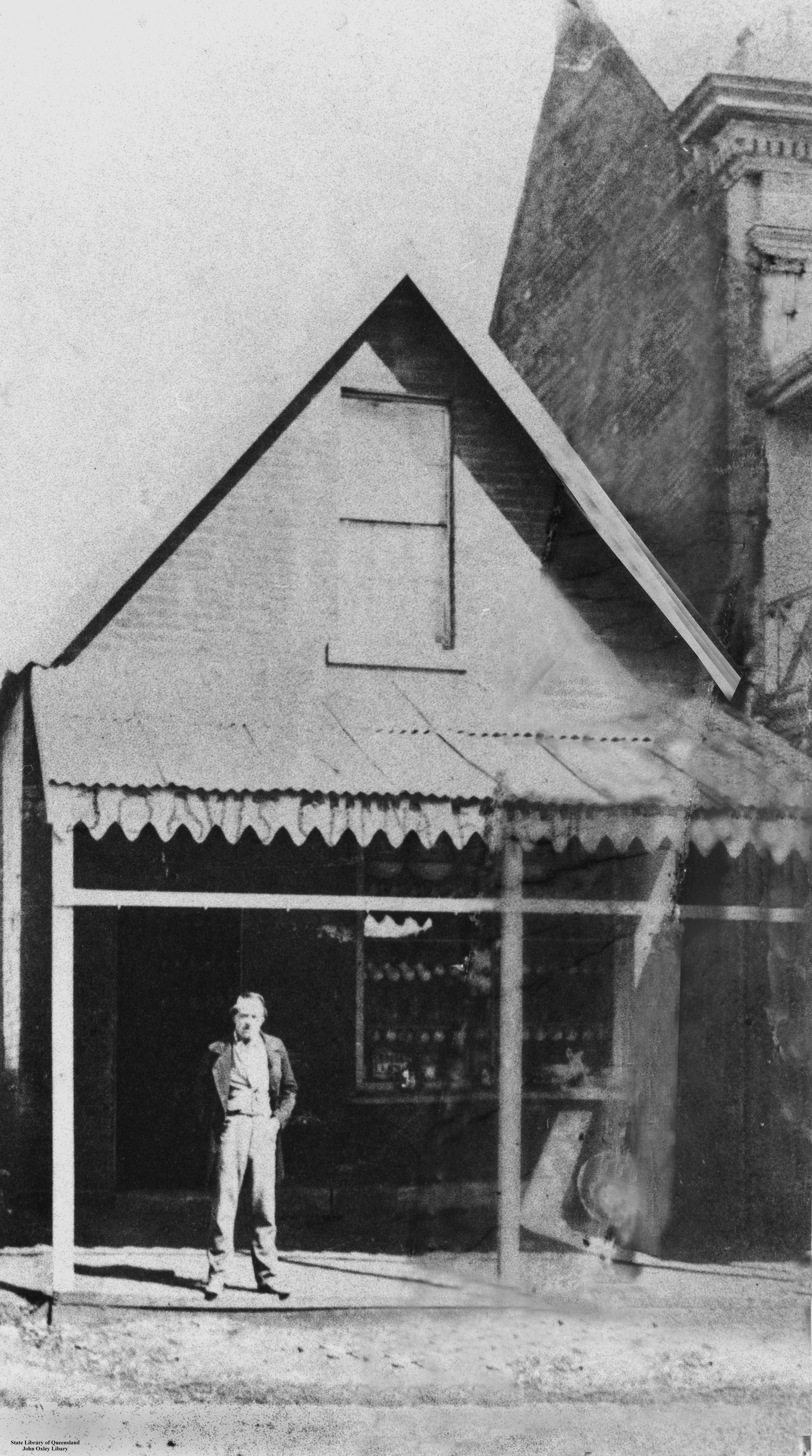
Davis outside his crockery store on George Street, c. 1872

Davis relearned English and gradually re-integrated into Western society. He was made to serve out the remainder of his sentence as a blacksmith for the police. In 1844, he was recommended for a ticket of leave. Not long after he returned to the Western world, Davis gave a recollection of his life to historian John Dunmore Lang. Though initially open to discussing his life in the bush, in later life Davis would "snappishly" refuse to describe his experiences.

Davis became employed by land commissioner Stephen Simpson. Later he became a blacksmith at Kangaroo Point. In 1864 he established a crockery shop in George Street. He retired from working at his shop some months before his death. He also briefly worked as a colonial expedition guide.

He occasionally worked as a court interpreter for Aboriginal people. According to Fred Campbell of Moreton Bay, Davis often manipulated the words of his Aboriginal clients for his own benefit. In 1866 he unsuccessfully petitioned the governor to raise his salary to the standards of other interpreters. Davis also gave some descriptions of Aboriginal rites, with the exception of one apparently obscene ceremony.

Davis is the subject of a 1893 painting titled Duramboi by Swedish-born artist Oscar Fristrom.

== Personal life ==
During his time in the bush, Davis had a son with an Aboriginal woman named Caleeraba. Their son was known as Calarga (meaning "the sparrow hawk") or Daybee. The events of Calarga's life after he grew to manhood are unknown.

On 3 November 1846, Davis married Annie Shea; she died in 1882. On 28 July 1883 he married Irish-born widow Bridget Hayes.

== Death ==
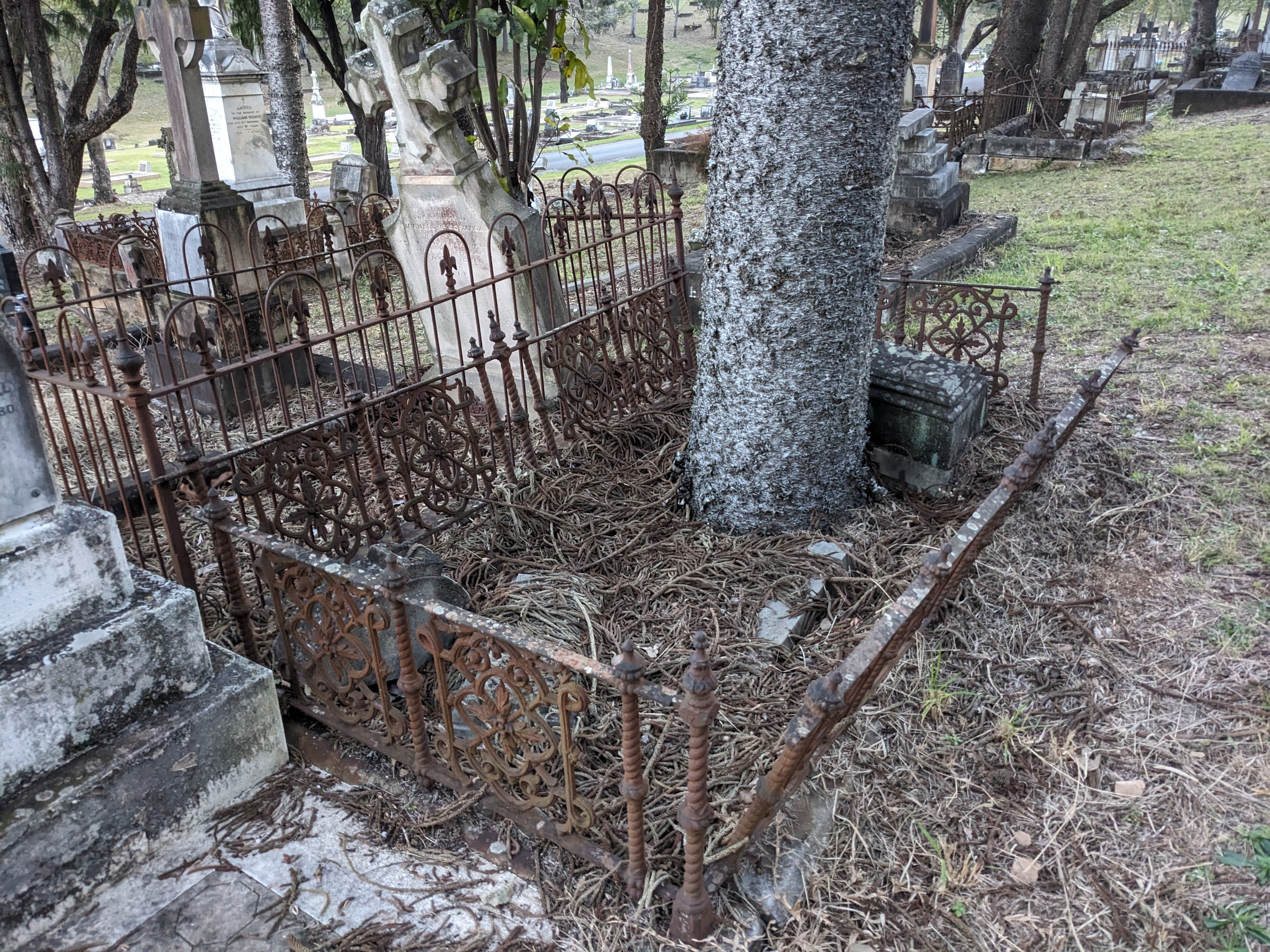
Davis's gravesite in Toowong Cemetery

By 1889, Davis was confined to his bed at his house in Burnett Lane as he was suffering from heart and lung disease. According to testimony from neighbour Potter Badson and his colleague Henry Ogelthie, on 30 April they saw Bridget, intoxicated, bumping Davis's head on the floor multiple times. Badson and Ogelthie claimed to have pulled Bridget off her husband before carrying Davis to the house of Davis's landlord, Gustav Faulte. Davis's doctor Grant Furley was sent for on the same day. When Furley arrived at Faulte's house at 1pm, Davis had an abrased wound on his left arm and his nightshirt was covered with blood which came from his arm and mouth. Bridget was absent. Furley concluded that the injuries had come from a violent assault, and he regularly attended Davis for the week after. A police officer, Constable Bailey, stated that he had visited Davis on 1 May, and that Davis was in a weak state with blood stains on his bed sheets. Davis died on 7 May. During the post-mortem, it was discovered that his heart, lung, liver and kidney were extensively diseased. His injuries from April had accelerated his death. He was buried in Toowong Cemetery.

Bridget was arrested for manslaughter on 6 May and appeared in court on 6 June. Furley gave medical testimony that Bridget assaulted Davis and accelerated his death. Badson testified that prior to Davis's death, Bridget had been "continually upbraiding [her husband] with not having given her more money". Bridget was incoherent and half-conscious during the hearing, and the case was adjourned. The case was continued on 21 June; Badson, Ogelthie, Faulte and Bailey testified. Bridget was found not guilty and consequently discharged on 24 August, before Chief Justice Charles Lilley.

According to Davis's obituary in the Brisbane Courier, ″his career included some of the strangest experiences that have ever fallen, perhaps, to any man in this colony, and are on a par with those of the once famous ′Crusoe′ of Victoria″.

Davis died a wealthy man. In his will, he donated £750 in 1889 and £1100 in 1911 to the Brisbane General Hospital. Though he was baptised in the Church of Scotland, Davis was a Catholic and in his will he gave a substantial bequest to St Stephen's Cathedral.

== See also ==
- List of convicts transported to Australia
- John Caesar
- Sheik Brown
- William Buckley
