= Jim Fernie =

Scottish footballer

Personal information
- Full name: James Fernie
- Date of birth: 31 October 1936 (age 90)
- Place of birth: Kirkcaldy, Scotland
- Position: Inside forward

Youth career
- Newburgh

Senior career*
Years	Team	Apps	(Gls)
1956–1959	Arbroath	56	(49)
1959–1961	Doncaster Rovers	89	(31)
1961–1962	Montrose	21	(9)
1962–1963	Forfar Athletic	17	(7)
- Auburn (Australia)
- Melbourne Knights
Total		183	(96)
- * Club domestic league appearances and goals

Jim Fernie (born 31 October 1936) is a Scottish footballer, who played for Arbroath, Doncaster Rovers, Montrose and Forfar Athletic.
