= John Anderson (footballer, born 1928) =

Scottish footballer

Personal information
- Full name: John Lockhart Anderson
- Date of birth: 5 April 1928
- Place of birth: Glasgow, Scotland
- Date of death: 6 April 2001 (aged 73)
- Place of death: Aldershot, Hampshire, England
- Position: Inside forward

Senior career*
Years	Team	Apps	(Gls)
1950–1951	Benburb	20	(35)
1951–1952	Partick Thistle	28	(19)
1953–1954	Northampton Town	23	(17)
1954–1955	Exeter City	25	(18)
1955–1956	Dundee	5	(4)
1956–1959	Wrexham	89	(77)
1959–1960	Rochdale	26	(22)
1960–1961	Chester	17	(15)
1961–1962	Wrexham	4	(3)
Total		237	(210)
- * Club domestic league appearances and goals

John Lockhart Anderson (5 April 1928 – 6 April 2001), was a Scottish footballer who played as an inside forward in the English Football League.
