= Bob Murdoch (Australian footballer) =

Australian rules footballer, born 1909

Personal information
- Full name: Robert Henry Murdoch
- Born: 17 June 1909; Bright, Victoria
- Died: 30 April 1965 (aged 55); Parkville, Victoria
- Height: 174 cm (5 ft 9 in)
- Weight: 85 kg (187 lb)

Playing career^{1}
Years	Club	Games (Goals)
1932–33	Hawthorn	20 (6)
- ^{1} Playing statistics correct to the end of 1933.

Robert Henry Murdoch (17 June 1909 – 30 April 1965) was an Australian rules footballer who played with Hawthorn in the Victorian Football League (VFL).
