= Ron Barnes (footballer) =

English footballer

Personal information
- Full name: Charles Ronald Barnes
- Date of birth: 21 February 1936
- Place of birth: Bolton, England
- Date of death: 7 December 1991 (aged 55)
- Height: 5 ft 11 in (1.80 m)
- Position: Midfielder

Youth career
- 19??–1954: Blackpool

Senior career*
Years	Team	Apps	(Gls)
1954–1959	Blackpool	9	(0)
1959–1961	Rochdale	91	(7)
1961–1963	Wrexham	88	(24)
1963–1964	Norwich City	21	(1)
1964–1966	Peterborough United	39	(6)
1965–1969	Torquay United	114	(25)
1969–1970	Cape Town City		
- * Club domestic league appearances and goals

Charles Ronald Barnes (21 February 1936 – 7 December 1991) was an English professional footballer. He played as a right winger, also as a left winger.

Born in Bolton, Lancashire, Barnes began his career as a junior with Blackpool, turning professional in May 1954. As the understudy to Stanley Matthews, his opportunities were understandably limited, and in June 1959, after only 9 league appearances he moved to Rochdale for a fee of £1,000. He quickly became a regular in the Spotland side, playing in 91 league games in 2 seasons, and scoring 7 goals. In July 1961, he was sold to Wrexham for a fee of £4,000, where he established himself as a goalscoring winger (24 goals in 88 league games).

He had two seasons with Wrexham, and helped them win promotion to the Third Division.

In August 1963, he moved to Norwich City, where he was to play 21 league games, and score only 1 goal, before moving to Peterborough United in July 1964 for a fee of £5,000. He played 39 league games (6 goals) for the Posh, before a move to Torquay United in January 1966, where he established himself as an unpredictable goalscoring winger.

In 1969, after 25 goals in 114 league games for Torquay, he left the English game, signing for Cape Town City, followed by his wife Brenda and 3 children, David, Helen and baby Matthew. He subsequently settled in South Africa working in the printing trade, before returning to England in 1987.
