= Martyn Croy =

New Zealand cricketer (born 1974)

Personal information
- Full name: Martyn Gilbert Croy
- Born: 21 January 1974 (age 52); Hamilton, Waikato, New Zealand
- Batting: Right-handed
- Role: Wicket-keeper

Domestic team information
- Years: Team
- 1994/95–2001/02: Otago
- FC debut: 7 December 1994 Otago v Central Districts
- Last FC: 12 March 2002 Otago v Canterbury
- LA debut: 27 November 1994 Otago v Canterbury
- Last LA: 25 January 2002 Otago v Central Districts

Career statistics
Competition	First-class	List A
Matches	65	75
Runs scored	1,664	1,135
Batting average	18.28	22.25
100s/50s	1/4	0/5
Top score	104	74
Catches/stumpings	183/14	70/11
- Source: CricInfo, 17 June 2023

Martyn Gilbert Croy (born 23 January 1974) is a New Zealand former cricketer who played for Otago between the 1994–95 season and 2001–02. A wicket-keeper, Croy toured England with the New Zealand national cricket team in 1999 and played for representative teams. Since retiring he has worked in sport administration.

== Cricket career ==
Croy was born at Hamilton in 1974. He played age-group cricket for Northern Districts during the 1993–94 season and toured Pakistan with the national under-19 team in early 1994, playing in all three under-19 Test matches and two of the three under-19 One Day Internationals on the tour. He moved to Otago the following season in search of a place in a representative team and made his debut playing for the team in a List A match against Canterbury at Centennial Park in Oamaru as the team's wicket-keeper. He scored 21 not out and held two catches on debut before going on to keep wicket in all but one of Otago's matches during the season. He made his first-class debut in December against Central Districts―scoring 61 runs and holding six catches as Otago won by an innings―and played against the touring West Indian team later in the season as well as appearing twice in first-class matches for the New Zealand Academy team against touring teams from South Africa and Sri Lanka.

After establishing himself in the Otago team, Croy was part of the New Zealand Academy team which toured South Africa in 1997. He was the deputy wicket-keeper to Adam Parore during the 1999 tour of England, picked for the quality of his wicket-keeping rather than for his weaker batting. He played in four first-class and three List A matches for New Zealand during the tour, but did not break in to the full international team. He toured England again in 2000, this time with the New Zealand A team, playing in five first-class matches―including against the West Indian team which was touring England at the time—and three List A fixtures, as well as playing for the New Zealanders against The Netherlands in one of the team's warm-up matches in Amsterdam.

Croy retired at the end of the 2001–02 season. He played in a total of 65 first-class matches―42 of them for Otago―and 75 List A matches. He scored 1,664 first-class and 1,135 List A runs. He took seven catches in an innings, at the time one of only four New Zealanders to have done so in first-class cricket in the country. The record was broken in 2010 when Derek de Boorder took eight catches in an innings for Otago, equally the world record for the number of catches in an innings by a wicket-keeper. When he retired Croy was third in wicket-keeping dismissals for Otago.

== Post-retirement ==
After working at the Otago Academy of Sport, Croy moved to work at High Performance Sport New Zealand, initially in Dunedin before moving to Christchurch in 2010. Working primarily with high performance support staff and administrators, including for Snow Sport NZ, Croy became an independent consultant in the industry in 2016, working with, amongst others, Paralympics New Zealand. He has coached wicket-keeping, both at age-group and senior level. He is married with three children.
