= Felix Staroscik =

Polish footballer

Personal information
- Full name: Felix Staroscik
- Date of birth: 20 May 1920
- Place of birth: Silesia, Poland
- Date of death: 7 August 2009 (aged 89)
- Place of death: Bedford, England
- Position: Winger

Youth career
- Polish Army XI

Senior career*
Years	Team	Apps	(Gls)
1946–1947	Wolverhampton Wanderers	0	(0)
1947–1951	Third Lanark	81	(33)
1951–1955	Northampton Town	49	(19)
1955–1958	Bedford Town		
1959–1960	Potton United		
- * Club domestic league appearances and goals

Felix Staroscik (20 May 1920 – 7 August 2009) was a Polish footballer who played as a winger for Third Lanark, Northampton Town and Bedford Town.

Born in Silesia, Poland, Staroscik played football for the Polish Army. By the end of the Second World War, he had moved to England as a refugee. He signed for Wolverhampton Wanderers as an amateur, but failed to make a first team appearance before transferring to Scottish side Third Lanark. He turned professional with the club, and went on to score 33 goals in 81 appearances before joining Northampton Town in July 1951.

Although he was a leading goalscorer for the reserves, Staroscik was unable to keep a regular place in the first team at Northampton. During his four-year spell at the club, he made 49 league appearances, scoring 19 goals, before moving to Bedford Town in 1955. At Bedford, Staroscik played a role in the club's 1955–56 FA Cup run, where they reached the Third Round before narrowly losing to First Division side Arsenal. Staroscik retired in 1958 and joined the coaching staff at Bedford, but came out of retirement to play for Potton United during the 1959–60 season.
