= Reesor =

Reesor may refer to:

Reesor is a surname. Reesor is an altered spelling of Swiss German surname, Reusser, an occupational name for a fisherman or maker of fish traps.

- Peter Reesor, founder of Markham, Ontario
- David Reesor, Ontario businessman and political figure
- John Reesor Williams, former politician in Ontario, Canada
- Reesor Siding Strike of 1963
- Reesor, Ontario
- Reesor Lake (Alberta)
