= Gwyn Hughes (footballer) =

Welsh footballer

Personal information
- Full name: Thomas Gwynfor Hughes
- Date of birth: 7 May 1922
- Place of birth: Blaenau Ffestiniog, Wales
- Date of death: 14 March 1999 (aged 76)
- Place of death: Northampton, England
- Position: Wing half

Senior career*
Years	Team	Apps	(Gls)
- Blaenau Ffestiniog Amateur
1945–1956	Northampton Town	225	(15)
- Bedford Town
- * Club domestic league appearances and goals

Thomas Gwynfor Hughes (7 May 1922 – 14 March 1999) was a Welsh professional footballer who played as a wing half.

== Career ==
Born in Blaenau Ffestiniog, Hughes played for Blaenau Ffestiniog Amateur, Northampton Town and Bedford Town.
