= Billy Millar (footballer, born 1924) =

Scottish footballer (1924–1995)

Personal information
- Full name: William Millar
- Date of birth: 24 July 1924
- Place of birth: Irvine, Scotland
- Date of death: March 1995 (aged 70)
- Place of death: Hyndburn, England
- Position: Winger

Senior career*
Years	Team	Apps	(Gls)
1943–1946	Partick Thistle	0	(0)
1946–1949	Aberdeen	27	(4)
1949–1950	Stirling Albion	16	(4)
1950–1953	Swindon Town	75	(18)
1953–1956	Gillingham	91	(35)
1956–1957	Accrington Stanley	26	(11)
- Kettering Town
Total		235	(72)
- * Club domestic league appearances and goals

William Millar (24 July 1924 – March 1995) was a Scottish professional footballer. He played for Aberdeen, Partick Thistle, Stirling Albion, Swindon Town, Gillingham and Accrington Stanley between 1946 and 1957.
