= Ronnie Bacon =

English footballer

Personal information
- Full name: Ronald Alfred Sydney Bacon
- Date of birth: 4 March 1935
- Place of birth: Fakenham, England
- Date of death: 25 September 2020 (aged 85)
- Position: Winger

Senior career*
Years	Team	Apps	(Gls)
1955–1958	Norwich City	42	(6)
1958–1961	Gillingham	128	(15)
–	King's Lynn	?	(?)
Total		170	(21)
- * Club domestic league appearances and goals

Ronald Alfred Sydney Bacon (4 March 1935 – 25 September 2020) was an English professional footballer who played as a winger for two clubs in the Football League, making 170 appearances.

== Early life ==
Ronald Alfred Sydney Bacon was born on 4 March 1935 in Fakenham, Norfolk.

== Career ==
Bacon began his professional career in 1955 with Norwich City, and he made 42 league appearances for them. Bacon then moved to Gillingham, making a further 128 appearances in the League. Bacon later played non-league football with King's Lynn.

== Personal life ==
Bacon was married to Hazel and had a son and two daughters.
