= Austin McGill =

Scottish footballer

Personal information
- Date of birth: 29 January 1935 (age 91)
- Place of birth: Dumfries, Scotland
- Position: Centre forward

Senior career*
Years	Team	Apps	(Gls)
- Nithsdale Wanderers
1958–1959	Queen of the South	7	(3)
1959–1960	Carlisle United	29	(12)
1960–1961	Kettering Town		
1961–19??	Queen of the South		
- * Club domestic league appearances and goals

Austin McGill (born 29 January 1935) is a Scottish former professional footballer who played in the Scottish Football League for Queen of the South and in the English Football League for Carlisle United. He played as a centre forward.

McGill was born in Dumfries. He played football for Nithsdale Wanderers before joining First Division club Queen of the South in July 1958. Queens were relegated at the end of the season, and in August 1959, McGill moved south of the border to sign for English Fourth Division club Carlisle United. He spent only one season with Carlisle, but scored twice on his debut, on the opening day of the season in a 2–2 draw against Crystal Palace, and finished the season as the club's leading league scorer with 12 goals. After leaving Carlisle, McGill moved to Kettering Town, for whom he scored 26 goals from 40 appearances and helped the club gain promotion to the Southern League Premier Division. In September 1961 he returned to Queen of the South.
