= Norman Dodgin =

English footballer and manager

Personal information
- Date of birth: 1 November 1921
- Place of birth: Gateshead, England
- Position: Defender

Senior career*
| Years | Team | Apps | (Gls) |
| 1947–1950 | Newcastle United | 84 | (1) |
| 1950–1951 | Reading | 13 | (1) |
| 1951–1953 | Northampton Town | 19 | (1) |
| 1953–1955 | Exeter City | 33 | (1) |
| Total | | 149 | (4) |

Managerial career
- 1953–1957: Exeter City
- 1957: Yeovil Town
- 1957–1958: Barrow
- 1958–1960: Oldham Athletic
- * Club domestic league appearances and goals

Norman Dodgin (born 1 November 1921 in Gateshead - August 2000) was an English footballer who played between 1947 and 1955. His predominant position was at defence.

Dodgin became a player-manager in 1953 while playing for Exeter City, until his retirement from playing in 1955, at which point he became a full-time manager. He was also a manager at Barrow from 1957 to 1958, and at Oldham Athletic between 1958 and 1960.

Norman was the brother of Bill Dodgin Sr. and the uncle of Bill Dodgin Jr., both of whom were professional footballers and football managers.

Dodgin died in August 2000. Evidence of this can be found in the Family Records Centre BMD Index & the Rothmans Football Yearbook 2001/2002 Obituaries Page

== Managerial record ==
| Club | From | To | Record | | | | |
| Club | From | To | P | W | D | L | % |
|---|---|---|---|---|---|---|---|
| Exeter City | 1 April 1953 | 30 April 1957 | 199 | 62 | 50 | 87 | 31.16 |
| Barrow | 24 July 1957 | May 1958 | 46 | 13 | 15 | 18 | 28.26 |
| Oldham Athletic | 1 July 1958 | 1 May 1960 | 97 | 27 | 17 | 53 | 27.84 |
| Total | | | 342 | 102 | 82 | 158 | 29.82 |
