= John Davies (footballer, born 1933) =

English footballer

Personal information
- Full name: John Robert Davies
- Date of birth: 26 September 1933 (age 93)
- Place of birth: Portsmouth, England
- Position: Winger

Youth career
- Portsmouth

Senior career*
Years	Team	Apps	(Gls)
1953–1955	Portsmouth	3	(0)
1955–1958	Scunthorpe United	67	(10)
1958–1961	Walsall	65	(16)
- * Club domestic league appearances and goals

John Robert Davies (born 26 September 1933) is an English professional footballer who played for Portsmouth, Scunthorpe United and Walsall.

== Honours ==
with Walsall

- Football League Fourth Division champion: 1959–60
