= John Kelly (footballer, born 1935) =

Scottish footballer

Personal information
- Full name: John Gerald Kelly
- Date of birth: 14 December 1935
- Place of birth: Glasgow, Scotland
- Date of death: 9 May 2012 (aged 76)
- Place of death: Glasgow, Scotland
- Position: Right half

Senior career*
Years	Team	Apps	(Gls)
- Shettleston
1956–1959	Third Lanark	79	(0)
1959–1960	Crewe Alexandra	20	(1)
1960–1961	Celtic	3	(0)
1961–1963	Greenock Morton	18	(1)
1963–1964	Barnsley	0	(0)
1964–1966	Cork Hibernians		
1966–1967	Third Lanark	4	(0)
Total		142	(3)
- * Club domestic league appearances and goals

John Gerald Kelly (14 December 1935 – 9 May 2012) was a Scottish professional footballer who played as a right half.

== Career ==
Born in Glasgow, Kelly played for Shettleston, Third Lanark, Crewe Alexandra, Celtic, Greenock Morton, Barnsley and Cork Hibernians.
