= Fred Ramscar =

English footballer

Personal information
- Full name: Frederick Thomas Ramscar
- Date of birth: 24 January 1919
- Place of birth: Salford, Greater Manchester, England
- Date of death: May 2003 (aged 83–84)
- Place of death: Northampton, England
- Position: Inside forward

Senior career*
Years	Team	Apps	(Gls)
	Stockport County	0	(0)
1946–1947	Wolverhampton Wanderers	16	(1)
1947–1950	Queens Park Rangers	51	(4)
1950–1951	Preston North End	19	(4)
1951–1955	Northampton Town	139	(55)
1954–1955	Millwall	30	(5)
1955-1955	Peterborough United		
1955-1956	Hinkley Athletic		
Total		255	(69)

International career
	Northern Ireland League	1	
- * Club domestic league appearances and goals

Frederick Thomas Ramscar (24 January 1919 – May 2003) was an English footballer who played in the Football League for Wolverhampton Wanderers, Queens Park Rangers, Preston North End, Northampton Town and Millwall.

Ramscar started the 1954/55 season with Northampton Town but after just four games moved on to Millwall. By June 1956, Ramscar was back in Northampton to take up an appointment as coach to the Colts team, for whom he also played when needed.
