= Don Adams (footballer) =

English footballer (1931–1993)

Personal information
- Full name: Donald Frederick Adams
- Date of birth: 15 February 1931
- Place of birth: Northampton, England
- Date of death: 1993 (aged 61–62)
- Place of death: Northampton, England
- Position: Forward

Senior career*
Years	Team	Apps	(Gls)
1951–1956	Northampton Town	23	(7)
- Bedford Town
- * Club domestic league appearances and goals

Donald Frederick Adams (15 February 1931 – 1993) was an English professional footballer who played in the Football League, as a forward.

Don was the son of a former Northampton Town footballer by the name of Fred Adams who played in the 1920s, and lived in Clark Road Northampton, the garden backing onto the old county ground Don spent many hours as a youngster at the football ground, not only watching but also training. As a youth he played for a local youth team, the 6th Northampton company of the Boys Brigade based in Kingsley. Don was introduced to the Cobblers one day when attending an injury clinic and got talking to Jack Jennings who had Tommy Mulgrew under treatment at the time. Don explained that he was on amateur forms with Chelsea, so it was suggested that he went along to the cobblers for a trial when he was fit again. From this opportunity he progressed through the A team and reserves (who used to draw 6000 crowds back in those days) to eventually play his first game for the club as a professional against Plymouth Argyle. He made 23 appearances, scoring 7 goals. Don played for the cobblers from 1951 to 1956 and went on to play for Bedford town and Rushden town.
