= Ron Walker (English footballer) =

English footballer

Personal information
- Full name: Ronald Walker
- Date of birth: 4 February 1932
- Place of birth: Sheffield, England
- Date of death: 29 October 2017 (aged 85)
- Position: Outside left

Youth career
- −1950: Sunderland

Senior career*
Years	Team	Apps	(Gls)
1950−1961	Doncaster Rovers	240	(46)
1961−1967	Bath City	249	(52)
- * Club domestic league appearances and goals

Ronald Walker (4 February 1932 – 29 October 2017) was an English footballer who played as an outside left for Doncaster Rovers and Bath City.

== Career ==
=== Sunderland ===
Walker was an amateur at Sunderland before his move to Doncaster in 1950 at the age of 18.

=== Doncaster Rovers ===
He made his debut first team appearance in the Division 2 game at Lincoln City on 30 August 1952 in front of a crowd of 20,775 and scored his first goal in his next match at Huddersfield on 9 September in a 3−1 defeat. In his first season, he played either outside left or inside left, scoring 4 times in his 21 games.

The following season was similar, though for the 1954−55 season competition for places was tough with him playing 8 games, and without scoring. Next season was marginally better with the same appearances but scoring 3 times, including the first time he had scored in a club win as he and Alick Jeffrey put goals past West Ham United in a 2−1 victory at Belle Vue.

Walker featured more in the 1956−57 season with 9 goals in 30 games, leaving him as 3rd top scorer at the club. Doncaster were relegated the next season but Walker ended up as top scorer with 9 goals and played in every League and FA Cup game. A second successive relegation came for Doncaster, and with it Walker was again top scorer at the club, sharing this with Jimmy Fletcher. Now in Division 4, Walker played in all but 2 league and FA Cup games, scoring his very first FA Cup goal in the round 1 replay win at Gainsborough Trinity.

In the 1960−61 season, his last at Doncaster, he played in 25 league and cup games including the first season of the Football League Cup in which he scored a brace in a 3−1 win against Stoke City.

=== Bath City ===
Walker then moved to Bath City where he was part of the side that drew 1−1 with Bolton Wanderers in the 3rd round of the FA Cup in January 1964. He played till the end of the 1966−67 season after which he became player-manager of Bath's reserve side for one year.

== Later life ==
He remained in Bath, working at Stothert & Pitts engineering works, continued to play local football for some years.

He died on 29 October 2017.
