= Clive Wallace =

Scottish footballer

Personal information
- Full name: Clive Low Wallace
- Date of birth: 6 January 1939
- Place of birth: Kirriemuir, Scotland
- Date of death: 2008 (aged 68–69)
- Place of death: Lambeth, London, England
- Position: Inside forward

Youth career
- Kirrie Thistle

Senior career*
Years	Team	Apps	(Gls)
1956–1957	Dundee United	3	(3)
1957–1958	Dundee	1	(0)
1958	Dundee United	4	(0)
1958–1959	Montrose	6	(1)
1959	Bury	0	(0)
1959–1960	Stockport County	13	(4)
- Forfar Celtic
- * Club domestic league appearances and goals

Clive Low Wallace (6 January 1939 – 2008) was a Scottish footballer who played as an inside forward. Wallace began his career in the mid-1950s as a trialist with Dundee United. Wallace featured in a handful of matches before playing a match for United's rivals, Dundee, returning to Tannadice for another four games. From here, Wallace moved to Montrose, before ending the decade with spells at Bury and Stockport County.

After leaving Stockport, Wallace returned to junior football in Scotland with Forfar Celtic.
