= John Croy =

Scottish footballer

Personal information
- Full name: John Croy
- Date of birth: 23 February 1925
- Place of birth: Falkirk, Scotland
- Date of death: September 1979 (aged 54)
- Place of death: Northampton, England
- Position: Centre half

Senior career*
Years	Team	Apps	(Gls)
- Grange Rovers
1948–1950	Third Lanark	0	(0)
1950–1954	Northampton Town	25	(0)
- Corby Town
- * Club domestic league appearances and goals

John Croy (23 February 1925 – September 1979) was a Scottish professional footballer who played in the Football League for Northampton Town as a centre half.
