= Larry Baxter =

English footballer (1931–2016)

Lawrence Raymond Baxter (24 November 1931 – 24 November 2016) was an English professional footballer.

Baxter, a right winger, joined Northampton Town in March 1952 and scored twice in 17 league games in the following two and a half years. In November 1954 he moved to Norwich City, playing only 5 league games before a move to Gillingham in October 1955. At Gillingham he finally found regular first team football, playing in 61 league games (7 goals) in the following 2 seasons. Out of the Gillingham side at the start of the 1957-58 campaign, he moved to Torquay United in September 1957. He played in 164 league games for Torquay, scoring 22 goals.

He left Torquay in July 1962, joining Cheltenham Town, helping the Gloucestershire side to promotion to the Southern League Premier Division. In March 1964, after scoring 19 times in 77 games for Cheltenham, Baxter moved to Deal Town as player-manager. He left Deal to join Margate in December 1965 after a financial crisis at Deal had resulted in the entire squad, including himself, being transfer listed. He was not a regular at Margate, making only 7 appearances before being released at the end of the 1965–66 season. He subsequently played for Loughborough Athletic, Bourne Town, Newfoundpool WMC, Linwood Lane (as player-manager), Enderby Forest, GEC Leicester, Groby (as player-manager), Blaby BC and St Andrews SC where he ended his career.

In May 2000, the Torquay-based Herald Express reported that Baxter was employed as a club singer in Leicester.

Baxter died at home on 24 November 2016 – his 85th birthday – in Leicester.
