= Tony Reeson =

English footballer

Personal information
- Full name: Maurice Anthony Reeson
- Date of birth: 24 September 1933
- Place of birth: Rotherham, England
- Date of death: 1990 (aged 56–57)
- Position: Inside forward

Senior career*
Years	Team	Apps	(Gls)
1953–1955	Rotherham United	4	(1)
1955–1958	Grimsby Town	76	(20)
1958–1959	Doncaster Rovers	21	(6)
1959–1960	Southport	42	(9)
1960–1962	Gainsborough Trinity		
1962–196?	Alfreton Town		
- * Club domestic league appearances and goals

Maurice Anthony "Tony" Reeson (24 September 1933 – 1990) was an English professional footballer who played as an inside forward.
