= Bobby Murdoch (footballer, born 1936) =

English footballer

Personal information
- Full name: William Robert Murdoch
- Date of birth: 25 January 1936
- Place of birth: Garston, Liverpool, England
- Date of death: 12 February 2017 (aged 81)
- Place of death: Cheshire, England
- Position: Inside forward

Youth career
- 1952–1955: South Liverpool
- 1955–1957: Liverpool

Senior career*
Years	Team	Apps	(Gls)
1957–1959	Liverpool	17	(5)
1959–1960	Barrow	41	(17)
1960–1962	Stockport County	58	(17)
1962	Carlisle United	10	(2)
1962–1963	Southport	33	(10)
- * Club domestic league appearances and goals

Bobby Murdoch (25 January 1936 – 12 February 2017) was an English professional footballer who played as a striker.

== Career ==
Murdoch began with South Liverpool, his local club, in 1952, making his debut in the Lancashire Combination second division aged 16. He signed for Liverpool on 11 May 1955 as an amateur and became a full professional in 1957. He made his Liverpool debut on Boxing Day 1957 and played 15 Football League division two matches in 1957–58. He played two League matches the season after before leaving Anfield in September 1959, two months before the arrival as manager of Bill Shankly. Murdoch later had spells with Bolton Wanderers, Barrow F.C., Stockport County, Carlisle United, Southport F.C., Wigan Athletic before he returned to South Liverpool in 1965. He became the South Liverpool player-manager, replacing Allen Hampson, in 1971 and remained at Holly Park until 1975–76.

== After football ==
After leaving football in 1976, he ran a taxi cab firm in Liverpool before he moved to Cheshire in 1982. He lived in retirement just outside Chester.

Murdoch died on 12 February 2017, at the age of 81.
