= Barry Pierce =

English footballer (1934–2020)

Personal information
- Full name: John Barry Pierce
- Date of birth: 13 August 1934
- Place of birth: Liverpool, Lancashire, England
- Date of death: 7 August 2020 (aged 85)
- Place of death: Durrington, Wiltshire, England
- Height: 5 ft 9 1/2 in (1.77 m)
- Position: Inside forward

Senior career*
Years	Team	Apps	(Gls)
	Everton	0	(0)
	Stockport County	0	(0)
- Truro City
1955–1959	Crystal Palace	85	(23)
1959–1961	Millwall	46	(17)
1961–1962	York City	12	(5)
1962–1963	Exeter City	28	(4)
1963–1965	Salisbury City		(25)
Total		171	(49)
- * Club domestic league appearances and goals

John Barry Pierce (13 August 1934 – 7 August 2020) was an English professional footballer who played as an inside forward in the Football League for Crystal Palace, Millwall, York City and Exeter City, in non-League football for Truro City and Salisbury City, and was on the books of Everton and Stockport County without making a league appearance. Pierce died in Durrington, Wiltshire on 7 August 2020, at the age of 85.
