= George Cooper (footballer, born 1932) =

English footballer

Personal information
- Date of birth: 1 October 1932
- Place of birth: Kingswinford, England
- Date of death: 1994 (aged 61–62)
- Position: Forward

Senior career*
Years	Team	Apps	(Gls)
–1955	Brierley Hill Alliance		
1955–1959	Crystal Palace	70	(27)
1959–1960	Rochdale	32	(9)
- * Club domestic league appearances and goals

George Cooper (1 October 1932 – 1994) was an English professional footballer who played as a forward in the Football League for Crystal Palace and Rochdale.

== Career ==
Cooper was born in Kingswinford, then within Staffordshire but subsequently part of the West Midlands. He began his career with Brierley Hill Alliance, then playing in the Birmingham & District League. In January 1955, he signed for Crystal Palace of the Third Division South. He made a goal-scoring debut in an away 4–1 win at Walsall on 12 March. He went on to make eight appearances that season scoring twice. In the subsequent four seasons, Cooper made a further 62 league appearances (25 goals) before moving on to Rochdale in January 1959. He made a total of 75 appearances in all competitions for Palace scoring 28 times.

== Personal life ==
Cooper died in 1994, aged 61–62.
