= 1960–61 Northampton Town F.C. season =

Northampton Town
1960–61 season
- Chairman: Walter Penn
- Manager: Dave Bowen
- Stadium: County Ground
- Division Four: 3rd
- FA Cup: Third round
- League Cup: Second round
- Top goalscorer: League: Laurie Brown (22); All: Laurie Brown (25)
- Highest home attendance: 21,000 vs Peterborough United
- Lowest home attendance: 6,835 vs Workington
- Average home league attendance: 10,682

The 1960–61 season was Northampton Town's 64th season in their history and the third successive season in the Fourth Division. Alongside competing in Division Four, the club also participated in the FA Cup, and the newly introduced Football League Cup.

== Players ==
As of match played 29 April 1961.

Name	Position	Nat.	Place of Birth	Date of Birth (Age)	Apps	Goals	Previous club	Date signed	Fee
Goalkeepers
Tony Brewer	GK	(England)	Edmonton	20 May 1932 (aged 28)	90	0	Millwall	August 1958	
Norman Coe	GK	(Wales)	Swansea	6 December 1940 (aged 20)	31	0	Arsenal	July 1960	
Full backs
Tony Claypole	RB	(England)	Weldon	13 February 1937 (aged 24)	100	1	Apprentice	August 1956	N/A
Ralph Phillips	RB	(England)	Hetton-le-Hole	9 August 1933 (aged 27)	89	1	Middlesbrough	November 1958	
Tony Haskins	LB	(England)	Northampton	26 July 1935 (aged 25)	7	0	Belper Town	August 1959	
Ron Patterson (c)	LB	(England)	Gateshead	30 October 1929 (aged 31)	315	5	Middlesbrough	Summer 1952	
Half backs
Terry Branston	CH	(England)	Rugby	25 July 1938 (aged 22)	17	0	Apprentice	October 1958	N/A
Colin Gale	CH	(Wales)	Pontypridd	31 August 1932 (aged 28)	222	1	Cardiff City	March 1956	£1,500
Alec Carson	WH	(Scotland)	Clarkston	12 November 1942 (aged 18)	1	0	Apprentice	November 1959	N/A
Barry Cooke	WH	(England)	Wolverhampton	12 January 1938 (aged 23)	61	1	West Bromwich Albion	July 1959	
Mike Everitt	WH	(England)	Weeley	16 January 1941 (aged 20)	16	4	Arsenal	February 1961	£4,000
Roly Mills	WH	(England)	Daventry	22 June 1933 (aged 27)	241	28	Apprentice	May 1951	N/A
Inside/Outside forwards
Tommy Fowler	OF	(England)	Prescot	16 December 1924 (aged 36)	547	88	Everton	March 1945	
Barry Lines	OF	(England)	Bletchley	16 May 1942 (aged 18)	27	5	Bletchley Town	September 1960	
Ron Spelman	OF	(England)	Blofield	22 May 1938 (aged 22)	12	1	Norwich City	November 1960	
Ken Tucker	OF	(Wales)	Merthyr Tydfil	15 July 1935 (aged 25)	13	3	Shrewsbury Town	January 1960	
Derek Woods	OF	(England)	Northampton	23 March 1941 (aged 20)	0	0	Apprentice	June 1959	N/A
Davie Laird	IF	(Scotland)	Rutherglen	11 February 1936 (aged 25)	14	1	St Mirren	August 1960	
Derek Leck	IF	(England)	Deal	8 February 1937 (aged 24)	78	34	Millwall	June 1958	
Jimmy Moran	IF	(Scotland)	Cleland	6 March 1935 (aged 26)	15	5	Norwich City	January 1961	
Mike Wright	IF	(England)	Newmarket	16 January 1942 (aged 19)	27	7	Newmarket Town	January 1960	
Centre forwards
Laurie Brown	CF	(England)	Shildon	22 August 1937 (aged 23)	38	25	Bishop Auckland	October 1960	
Bob Edwards	CF	(England)	Guildford	22 May 1931 (aged 29)	13	8	Norwich City	March 1961	

== Competitions ==
=== Division Four ===
==== League table ====
Pos	Team	Pld	W	D	L	GF	GA	GAv	Pts	Promotion or relegation
1	Peterborough United (C, P)	46	28	10	8	134	65	2.062	66	Promotion to the Third Division
2	Crystal Palace (P)	46	29	6	11	110	69	1.594	64	Promotion to the Third Division
3	Northampton Town (P)	46	25	10	11	90	62	1.452	60	Promotion to the Third Division
4	Bradford (Park Avenue) (P)	46	26	8	12	84	74	1.135	60	Promotion to the Third Division
5	York City	46	21	9	16	80	60	1.333	51	

Source: rsssf.com
(C) Champions; (P) Promoted

==== League position by match ====
Round	1	2	3	4	5	6	7	8	9	10	11	12	13	14	15	16	17	18	19	20	21	22	23	24	25	26	27	28	29	30	31	32	33	34	35	36	37	38	39	40	41	42	43	44	45	46
Ground	A	A	H	H	H	A	A	H	H	H	A	H	A	A	H	A	H	H	A	A	H	H	A	H	A	H	A	H	A	H	A	A	H	A	H	H	A	A	H	H	A	A	A	H	H	A
Result	W	L	W	W	W	W	W	W	W	W	L	D	L	D	W	D	L	D	D	D	W	W	W	W	D	L	W	W	L	L	L	W	D	W	D	W	L	W	W	W	W	L	D	W	W	L
Position	3	13	11	5	4	3	1	1	1	1	1	3	3	4	3	3	3	3	4	4	4	3	3	2	3	4	4	3	3	4	5	4	4	3	4	3	4	3	3	3	3	3	3	3	3	3

Source: 11v11.com
A = Away; H = Home; W = Win; D = Draw; L = Loss

==== Matches ====
Win Draw Loss

20 August 1960 1	Oldham Athletic	1–2	Northampton Town	Oldham
BST			M.Deakin	Stadium: Boundary Park; Attendance: 8,929

24 August 1960 2	Workington	3–0	Northampton Town	Workington
19:00 BST				Stadium: Borough Park; Attendance: 3,439

27 August 1960 3	Northampton Town	2–1	Aldershot	Northampton
BST	M.Deakin; D.Leck			Stadium: County Ground; Attendance: 8,092

29 August 1960 4	Northampton Town	3–2	Workington	Northampton
18:15 BST	D.Leck; M.Wright			Stadium: County Ground; Attendance: 6,835

3 September 1960 5	Northampton Town	4–2	Stockport County	Northampton
15:00 BST	M.Deakin; M.Wright			Stadium: County Ground; Attendance: 8,661

7 September 1960 6	Crewe Alexandra	0–2	Northampton Town	Crewe
BST			M.Deakin; D.Leck	Stadium: Gresty Road; Attendance: 8,499

10 September 1960 7	Bradford (Park Avenue)	1–3	Northampton Town	Bradford
BST			M.Deakin; R.Mills; M.Wright	Stadium: Park Avenue; Attendance: 7,616

13 September 1960 8	Northampton Town	4–1	Crewe Alexandra	Northampton
17:45 BST	M.Deakin; T.Fowler; D.Leck o.g.'			Stadium: County Ground; Attendance: 9,034

17 September 1960 9	Northampton Town	3–1	Gillingham	Northampton
15:00 BST	B.Oláh; M.Wright			Stadium: County Ground; Attendance: 9,575

19 September 1960 10	Northampton Town	3–2	Chester City	Northampton
17:30 BST	T.Fowler; B.Oláh; D.Leck			Stadium: County Ground; Attendance: 9,320

24 September 1960 11	Barrow	1–0	Northampton Town	Barrow
BST				Stadium: Holker Street; Attendance: 5,583

1 October 1960 12	Northampton Town	2–2	Millwall	Northampton
BST	L.Brown; D.Leck			Stadium: County Ground; Attendance: 11,558

3 October 1960 13	Accrington Stanley	3–2	Northampton Town	Accrington
GMT			L.Brown; D.Leck	Stadium: Peel Park; Attendance: 4,603

8 October 1960 14	Peterborough United	3–3	Northampton Town	Peterborough
15:15 GMT			M.Deakin; T.Fowler; D.Leck	Stadium: London Road; Attendance: 22,959

15 October 1960 15	Northampton Town	3–1	Southport	Northampton
GMT	B.Oláh; K.Tucker			Stadium: County Ground; Attendance: 11,014

22 October 1960 16	Darlington	1–1	Northampton Town	Darlington
GMT			L.Brown	Stadium: Feethams; Attendance: 8,858

29 October 1960 17	Northampton Town	1–2	Crystal Palace	Northampton
GMT	K.Tucker			Stadium: County Ground; Attendance: 13,943

12 November 1960 18	Northampton Town	3–3	Hartlepool United	Northampton
GMT	L.Brown			Stadium: County Ground; Attendance: 9,484

19 November 1960 19	Wrexham	2–2	Northampton Town	Wrexham, Wales
15:15 GMT			L.Brown	Stadium: Racecourse Ground; Attendance: 6,328

3 December 1960 20	Rochdale	1–1	Northampton Town	Rochdale
15:15 GMT			B.Lines	Stadium: Spotland; Attendance: 2,173

10 December 1960 21	Northampton Town	1–0	Mansfield Town	Northampton
GMT	D.Laird			Stadium: County Ground; Attendance: 8,129

17 December 1960 22	Northampton Town	1–0	Oldham Athletic	Northampton
GMT	R.Spelman			Stadium: County Ground; Attendance: 9,710

26 December 1960 23	York City	0–1	Northampton Town	York
GMT			o.g.'	Stadium: Bootham Crescent; Attendance: 7,391

27 December 1960 24	Northampton Town	3–1	York City	Northampton
GMT	L.Brown; B.Lines			Stadium: County Ground; Attendance: 18,384

31 December 1960 25	Aldershot	2–2	Northampton Town	Aldershot
GMT			L.Brown; M.Deakin	Stadium: Recreation Ground; Attendance: 7,117

21 January 1961 26	Northampton Town	0–1	Bradford (Park Avenue)	Northampton
GMT				Stadium: County Ground; Attendance: 9,749

28 January 1961 27	Doncaster Rovers	0–2	Northampton Town	Doncaster
GMT			L.Brown; M.Deakin	Stadium: Belle Vue; Attendance: 3,028

11 February 1961 28	Northampton Town	3–0	Barrow	Northampton
GMT	L.Brown; J.Moran			Stadium: County Ground; Attendance: 9,255

18 February 1961 29	Millwall	3–1	Northampton Town	Doncaster
15:15 GMT			B.Cooke; C.Gale (red card)	Stadium: Belle Vue; Attendance: 11,707

25 February 1961 30	Northampton Town	0–3	Peterborough United	Northampton
GMT				Stadium: County Ground; Attendance: 21,000

4 March 1961 31	Southport	2–0	Northampton Town	Southport
GMT				Stadium: Haig Avenue; Attendance: 4,693

8 March 1961 32	Chester City	0–2	Northampton Town	Chester
19:30 GMT			M.Everitt; D.Leck	Stadium: Sealand Road; Attendance: 5,455

11 March 1961 33	Northampton Town	1–1	Darlington	Northampton
GMT	L.Brown			Stadium: County Ground; Attendance: 10,124

18 March 1961 34	Crystal Palace	2–3	Northampton Town	Selhurst, London
GMT			B.Edwards; D.Leck	Stadium: Selhurst Park; Attendance: 20,668

21 March 1961 35	Northampton Town	0–0	Carlisle United	Northampton
GMT				Stadium: County Ground; Attendance: 11,593

25 March 1961 36	Northampton Town	3–0	Doncaster Rovers	Northampton
GMT	B.Edwards; D.Leck			Stadium: County Ground; Attendance: 8,604

1 April 1961 37	Hartlepool United	4–2	Northampton Town	Hartlepool
BST			B.Edwards	Stadium: Victoria Park; Attendance: 3,460

3 April 1961 38	Exeter City	1–3	Northampton Town	Exeter
15:00 BST			B.Edwards; M.Everitt; J.Moran	Stadium: St James Park; Attendance: 5,903

4 April 1961 39	Northampton Town	3–1	Exeter City	Northampton
19:15 GMT	L.Brown			Stadium: County Ground; Attendance: 12,402

8 April 1961 40	Northampton Town	3–0	Wrexham	Northampton
15:00 GMT	L.Brown; M.Everitt; B.Lines			Stadium: County Ground; Attendance: 11,507

12 April 1961 41	Gillingham	0–1	Northampton Town	Gillingham
18:00 BST			B.Lines	Stadium: Priestfield; Attendance: 4,831
Note: Fixture was previously postponed on February 4, 1961.

15 April 1961 42	Carlisle United	2–1	Northampton Town	Carlisle
15:00 BST			R.Mills	Stadium: Brunton Park; Attendance: 3,985

17 April 1961 43	Stockport County	1–1	Northampton Town	Stockport
19:30 BST			B.Edwards	Stadium: Edgeley Park; Attendance: 4,307
Note: Fixture was previously postponed on January 14, 1961.

22 April 1961 44	Northampton Town	5–1	Rochdale	Northampton
GMT	L.Brown; J.Moran			Stadium: County Ground; Attendance: 9,535

25 April 1961 45	Northampton Town	2–1	Accrington Stanley	Northampton
GMT	L.Brown; B.Lines			Stadium: County Ground; Attendance: 8,167

29 April 1961 46	Mansfield Town	4–2	Northampton Town	Mansfield
15:00 BST			B.Edwards; M.Everitt	Stadium: Field Mill; Attendance: 4,872

=== FA Cup ===
5 November 1960 First round	Northampton Town	2–1	Hastings United	Northampton
GMT	L.Brown; Wilson			Stadium: County Ground; Attendance: 11,141

26 November 1960 Second round	Romford	1–5	Northampton Town	Romford, London
14:15 GMT			L.Brown; D.Leck	Stadium: Brooklands Stadium; Attendance: 11,073

7 January 1961 Third round	Luton Town	4–0	Northampton Town	Luton
15:00 GMT				Stadium: Kenilworth Road; Attendance: 26,220

=== League Cup ===
18 October 1960 First round	Northampton Town	1–1	Wrexham	Northampton
GMT			B.Cooke	Stadium: County Ground; Attendance: 12,029

25 October 1960 First round (r)	Wrexham	2–0	Northampton Town	Wrexham, Wales
19:00 GMT				Stadium: Racecourse Ground; Attendance: 7,518

=== Appearances and goals ===
Pos	Player	Division Four		FA Cup		League Cup		Total	
Pos	Player	Starts	Goals	Starts	Goals	Starts	Goals	Starts	Goals
GK	Tony Brewer	18	–	1	–	1	–	20	–
GK	Norman Coe	28	–	2	–	1	–	31	–
FB	Tony Claypole	42	–	3	–	2	–	47	–
FB	Tony Haskins	–	–	–	–	–	–	–	–
FB	Ron Patterson	8	–	–	–	–	–	8	–
FB	Ralph Phillips	42	–	3	–	2	–	47	–
HB	Terry Branston	17	–	–	–	–	–	17	–
HB	Alec Carson	1	–	–	–	–	–	1	–
HB	Barry Cooke	31	1	2	–	1	–	34	1
HB	Mike Everitt	16	4	–	–	–	–	16	4
HB	Colin Gale	39	–	3	–	2	–	44	–
HB	Roly Mills	45	2	3	–	2	1	50	3
OF	Tommy Fowler	19	3	–	–	–	–	19	3
OF	Barry Lines	24	5	2	–	1	–	27	5
OF	Ron Spelman	11	1	1	–	–	–	12	1
OF	Ken Tucker	7	3	2	–	1	–	10	3
OF	Derek Woods	–	–	–	–	–	–	–	–
IF	Davie Laird	12	1	1	–	1	–	14	1
IF	Derek Leck	29	13	3	3	1	–	33	16
IF	Jimmy Moran	15	5	–	–	–	–	15	5
IF	Wilson	–	–	1	1	–	–	1	1
IF	Mike Wright	23	6	–	–	2	–	25	6
CF	Laurie Brown	33	22	3	3	2	–	38	25
CF	Bob Edwards	13	8	–	–	–	–	13	8
Players who left before end of season:
OF	Béla Oláh	14	3	1	–	–	–	15	3
CF	Mike Deakin	19	11	1	–	2	–	22	11
