= 1959–60 Northampton Town F.C. season =

Northampton Town
1959–60 season
- Chairman: Walter Penn
- Manager: Dave Bowen
- Stadium: County Ground
- Division Four: 6th
- FA Cup: First round
- Top goalscorer: League: Mike Deakin (20); All: Mike Deakin (20)
- Highest home attendance: 13,041 vs Walsall
- Lowest home attendance: 3,477 vs Darlington
- Average home league attendance: 8,306

The 1959–60 season was Northampton Town's 63rd season in their history and the second successive season in the Fourth Division. Alongside competing in Division Four, the club also participated in the FA Cup.

== Players ==
As of match played 30 April 1960.

Name	Position	Nat.	Place of Birth	Date of Birth (Age)	Apps	Goals	Previous club	Date signed	Fee
Goalkeepers
Tony Brewer	GK	(England)	Edmonton	20 May 1932 (aged 27)	70	0	Millwall	August 1958	
Peter Isaac	GK	(Wales)	Pontypridd	16 May 1931 (aged 28)	8	0	Barry Town	July 1959	
Full backs
Tony Claypole	RB	(England)	Weldon	13 February 1937 (aged 23)	53	1	Apprentice	August 1956	N/A
Ralph Phillips	RB	(England)	Hetton-le-Hole	9 August 1933 (aged 26)	42	1	Middlesbrough	November 1958	
Tony Haskins	LB	(England)	Northampton	26 July 1935 (aged 24)	7	0	Belper Town	August 1959	
Ron Patterson (c)	LB	(England)	Gateshead	30 October 1929 (aged 30)	307	5	Middlesbrough	Summer 1952	
Half backs
Jim Fotheringham	CH	(Scotland)	Hamilton	31 August 1932 (aged 27)	12	0	Hearts	Summer 1959	
Colin Gale	CH	(Wales)	Pontypridd	31 August 1932 (aged 27)	178	1	Cardiff City	March 1956	£1,500
Dave Bowen	WH	(Wales)	Maesteg	7 June 1928 (aged 31)	35	1	Arsenal	July 1959	£7,000
Barry Cooke	WH	(England)	Wolverhampton	12 January 1938 (aged 22)	25	0	West Bromwich Albion	July 1959	
Roly Mills	WH	(England)	Daventry	22 June 1933 (aged 26)	191	25	Apprentice	May 1951	N/A
John Smith	WH	(England)	Leicester	4 September 1928 (aged 31)	196	9	Apprentice	May 1949	N/A
Inside/Outside forwards
Jack English	OF	(England)	South Shields	19 March 1923 (aged 37)	322	143	Apprentice	Summer 1947	N/A
Tommy Fowler	OF	(England)	Prescot	16 December 1924 (aged 35)	528	85	Everton	March 1945	
Frank Griffin	OF	(England)	Pendlebury	28 March 1928 (aged 32)	17	0	West Bromwich Albion	Summer 1959	
Béla Oláh	OF	(Hungary)	Hungary	8 June 1938 (aged 21)	28	5	Bedford Town	December 1958	
Ken Tucker	OF	(Wales)	Merthyr Tydfil	15 July 1935 (aged 24)	3	0	Shrewsbury Town	January 1960	
Peter Kane	IF	(Scotland)	Glasgow	4 April 1939 (aged 21)	29	17	Queen's Park	November 1959	
Derek Leck	IF	(England)	Deal	8 February 1937 (aged 23)	45	18	Millwall	June 1958	
Bobby Tebbutt	IF	(England)	Irchester	10 November 1934 (aged 25)	60	24	Apprentice	October 1956	N/A
Ritchie Ward	IF	(England)	Scunthorpe	16 September 1940 (aged 19)	6	0	Scunthorpe United	Summer 1959	
Mike Wright	IF	(England)	Newmarket	16 January 1942 (aged 18)	2	1	Newmarket Town	January 1960	
Centre forwards
Mike Deakin	CF	(England)	Birmingham	25 October 1933 (aged 26)	26	20	Crystal Palace	October 1959	Exchange

== Competitions ==
=== Division Four ===
==== League table ====
Pos	Team	Pld	W	D	L	GF	GA	GAv	Pts	Promotion or relegation
4	Watford (P)	46	24	9	13	92	67	1.373	57	Promotion to the Third Division
5	Millwall	46	18	17	11	84	61	1.377	53	
6	Northampton Town	46	22	9	15	85	63	1.349	53	
7	Gillingham	46	21	10	15	74	69	1.072	52	
8	Crystal Palace	46	19	12	15	84	64	1.313	50	

Source: rsssf.com
(P) Promoted

==== League position by match ====
Round	1	2	3	4	5	6	7	8	9	10	11	12	13	14	15	16	17	18	19	20	21	22	23	24	25	26	27	28	29	30	31	32	33	34	35	36	37	38	39	40	41	42	43	44	45	46
Ground	A	H	A	A	H	H	A	A	H	H	A	A	H	A	H	A	H	A	A	H	H	H	H	H	A	H	A	H	A	H	A	A	H	A	H	A	A	H	H	A	A	H	H	A	H	A
Result	D	W	L	L	D	W	D	L	W	L	L	L	W	W	D	L	L	W	D	L	D	D	L	W	L	W	W	W	L	W	L	W	W	W	W	W	L	W	W	W	W	D	W	W	D	L
Position	14	2	11	16	13	9	9	12	11	12	16	18	13	14	15	18	18	18	18	18	18	18	18	18	19	18	18	18	18	18	18	18	15	15	14	13	14	12	8	8	6	6	6	5	5	6

Source: 11v11.com
A = Away; H = Home; W = Win; D = Draw; L = Loss

==== Matches ====
Win Draw Loss

22 August 1959 1	Exeter City	1–1	Northampton Town	Exeter
15:15 BST			D.Leck	Stadium: St James Park; Attendance: 9,678

27 August 1959 2	Northampton Town	3–0	Torquay United	Northampton
BST	D.Leck; B.Tebbutt			Stadium: County Ground; Attendance: 12,974

29 August 1959 3	Doncaster Rovers	3–2	Northampton Town	Doncaster
BST			D.Leck; A.Woan	Stadium: Belle Vue; Attendance: 7,033

2 September 1959 4	Torquay United	5–3	Northampton Town	Torquay
18:00 BST			B.Kirkup; D.Leck	Stadium: Plainmoor; Attendance: 7,447

5 September 1959 5	Northampton Town	0–0	Workington	Northampton
BST				Stadium: County Ground; Attendance: 11,298

10 September 1959 6	Northampton Town	2–1	Gillingham	Northampton
BST	R.Mills; A.Woan			Stadium: County Ground; Attendance: 9,622

12 September 1959 7	Rochdale	2–2	Northampton Town	Rochdale
15:00 BST	S.Milburn 18' (pen.); B.Thomson 87'	Report	D.Leck 1', 79'	Stadium: Spotland; Attendance: 5,686; Referee: J H Hemingway

16 September 1959 8	Gillingham	2–1	Northampton Town	Gillingham
17:30 BST			A.Woan	Stadium: Priestfield; Attendance: 5,970

19 September 1959 9	Northampton Town	2–0	Gateshead	Northampton
BST	D.Leck			Stadium: County Ground; Attendance: 9,426

21 September 1959 10	Northampton Town	0–3	Millwall	Northampton
17:30 BST				Stadium: County Ground; Attendance: 8,675

26 September 1959 11	Darlington	3–2	Northampton Town	Darlington
BST			J.English	Stadium: Feethams; Attendance: 7,199

28 September 1959 12	Millwall	2–1	Northampton Town	New Cross, London
19:30 BST			J.English	Stadium: The Den; Attendance: 18,950

3 October 1959 13	Northampton Town	2–0	Aldershot	Northampton
BST	D.Leck; A.Woan			Stadium: County Ground; Attendance: 8,316

10 October 1959 14	Oldham Athletic	0–1	Northampton Town	Oldham
15:00 GMT			C.Ferguson o.g.'	Stadium: Boundary Park; Attendance: 5,419

17 October 1959 15	Northampton Town	2–2	Carlisle United	Northampton
GMT	T.Fowler; A.Woan			Stadium: County Ground; Attendance: 8,789

24 October 1959 16	Notts County	2–1	Northampton Town	Nottingham
GMT			A.Woan	Stadium: Meadow Lane; Attendance: 14,867

31 October 1959 17	Northampton Town	0–1	Walsall	Northampton
GMT				Stadium: County Ground; Attendance: 13,041

7 November 1959 18	Hartlepools United	1–4	Northampton Town	Hartlepool
GMT			M.Deakin; P.Kane; D.Leck	Stadium: Victoria Park; Attendance: 1,953

21 November 1959 19	Chester	1–1	Northampton Town	Chester
14:45 GMT	J.Pimlott		M.Deakin	Stadium: Sealand Road; Attendance: 7,283

28 November 1959 20	Northampton Town	0–2	Crystal Palace	Northampton
GMT				Stadium: County Ground; Attendance: 8,121

12 December 1959 21	Northampton Town	1–1	Stockport County	Northampton
GMT	B.Oláh			Stadium: County Ground; Attendance: 6,383

19 December 1959 22	Northampton Town	1–1	Exeter City	Northampton
GMT	P.Kane			Stadium: County Ground; Attendance: 4,709

28 December 1959 23	Northampton Town	1–2	Watford	Northampton
14:15 GMT	B.Tebbutt			Stadium: County Ground; Attendance: 8,369

2 January 1960 24	Northampton Town	3–1	Doncaster Rovers	Northampton
14:30 GMT	T.Fowler; R.Mills; B.Tebbutt			Stadium: County Ground; Attendance: 6,253

16 January 1960 25	Workington	5–1	Northampton Town	Workington
15:15 GMT			D.Bowen	Stadium: Borough Park; Attendance: 3,788

23 January 1960 26	Northampton Town	3–1	Rochdale	Northampton
GMT	P.Kane 15'; M.Deakin 43'; B.Oláh 65'	Report	S.Milburn 62'	Stadium: County Ground; Attendance: 5,355

6 February 1960 27	Gateshead	1–3	Northampton Town	Gateshead
GMT			P.Kane; R.Mills	Stadium: Redheugh Park; Attendance: 3,164

13 February 1960 28	Northampton Town	3–1	Darlington	Northampton
GMT	P.Kane; B.Oláh			Stadium: County Ground; Attendance: 3,477

20 February 1960 29	Aldershot	3–0	Northampton Town	Aldershot
GMT				Stadium: Recreation Ground; Attendance: 4,197

27 February 1960 30	Northampton Town	8–1	Oldham Athletic	Northampton
GMT	M.Deakin; P.Kane; B.Tebbutt; C.Ferguson o.g.'			Stadium: County Ground; Attendance: 6,746

1 March 1960 31	Watford	3–1	Northampton Town	Watford
19:30 GMT			P.Kane	Stadium: Vicarage Road; Attendance: 13,024
Note: Fixture was previously postponed on 26 December 1959 due to waterlogged pitch.

5 March 1960 32	Carlisle United	0–2	Northampton Town	Carlisle
15:00 GMT			M.Deakin; R.Mills	Stadium: Brunton Park; Attendance: 3,503

12 March 1960 33	Northampton Town	4–2	Notts County	Northampton
GMT	M.Deakin; P.Kane; B.Tebbutt			Stadium: County Ground; Attendance: 8,902

19 March 1960 34	Walsall	1–2	Northampton Town	Walsall
GMT			M.Deakin	Stadium: Fellows Park; Attendance: 9,852

26 March 1960 35	Northampton Town	3–0	Hartlepools United	Northampton
GMT	M.Deakin; P.Kane; M.Wright			Stadium: County Ground; Attendance: 5,954

2 April 1960 36	Crewe Alexandra	0–1	Northampton Town	Crewe
GMT			M.Deakin	Stadium: Gresty Road; Attendance: 5,901

7 April 1960 37	Bradford (Park Avenue)	3–0	Northampton Town	Bradford
BST				Stadium: Park Avenue; Attendance: 4,916
Note: Fixture was previously postponed on 30 January 1960.

9 April 1960 38	Northampton Town	1–0	Chester	Northampton
BST	M.Deakin			Stadium: County Ground; Attendance: 7,037

11 April 1960 39	Northampton Town	6–0	Barrow	Northampton
18:00 BST	M.Deakin; P.Kane			Stadium: County Ground; Attendance: 5,710

15 April 1960 40	Southport	0–4	Northampton Town	Southport
15:00 BST			P.Kane; B.Oláh	Stadium: Haig Avenue; Attendance: 3,612

16 April 1960 41	Crystal Palace	0–1	Northampton Town	Selhurst, London
BST			M.Deakin	Stadium: Selhurst Park; Attendance: 15,943

19 April 1960 42	Northampton Town	2–2	Southport	Northampton
15:00 BST	D.Leck			Stadium: County Ground; Attendance: 12,373

23 April 1960 43	Northampton Town	3–1	Bradford (Park Avenue)	Northampton
15:00 BST	M.Deakin; T.Fowler			Stadium: County Ground; Attendance: 8,667

25 April 1960 44	Barrow	0–1	Northampton Town	Barrow-in-Furness
BST			D.Leck	Stadium: Holker Street; Attendance: 5,400

28 April 1960 45	Northampton Town	0–0	Crewe Alexandra	Northampton
18:30 BST				Stadium: County Ground; Attendance: 10,847

30 April 1960 46	Stockport County	3–0	Northampton Town	Stockport
15:00 BST				Stadium: Edgeley Park; Attendance: 3,853

=== FA Cup ===
14 November 1959 First round	Torquay United	7–1	Northampton Town	Torquay
14:15 GMT			P.Kane	Stadium: Plainmoor; Attendance: 5,661

=== Appearances and goals ===
Pos	Player	Division Four		FA Cup		Total	
Pos	Player	Starts	Goals	Starts	Goals	Starts	Goals
GK	Tony Brewer	38	–	1	–	39	–
GK	Peter Isaac	8	–	–	–	8	–
FB	Tony Claypole	15	–	–	–	15	–
FB	Tony Haskins	7	–	–	–	7	–
FB	Ron Patterson	39	–	1	–	40	–
FB	Ralph Phillips	31	–	1	–	32	–
HB	Dave Bowen	22	1	1	–	23	1
HB	Barry Cooke	25	–	–	–	25	–
HB	Jim Fotheringham	11	–	1	–	12	–
HB	Colin Gale	35	–	–	–	35	–
HB	Roly Mills	41	4	1	–	42	4
HB	John Smith	11	–	–	–	11	–
OF	Jack English	6	3	–	–	6	3
OF	Tommy Fowler	41	4	1	–	42	4
OF	Frank Griffin	16	–	1	–	17	–
OF	Béla Oláh	26	5	–	–	26	5
OF	Ken Tucker	3	–	–	–	3	–
IF	Peter Kane	28	16	1	1	29	17
IF	Derek Leck	30	14	1	–	31	14
IF	Bobby Tebbutt	15	7	–	–	15	7
IF	Ritchie Ward	6	–	–	–	6	–
IF	Mike Wright	2	1	–	–	2	1
CF	Mike Deakin	25	20	1	–	26	20
Players who left before end of season:
IF	Brian Kirkup	9	2	–	–	9	2
IF	Peter Vickers	2	–	–	–	2	–
IF	Alan Woan	14	6	–	–	14	6
