= North London derby =

Club football rivalry in London, England

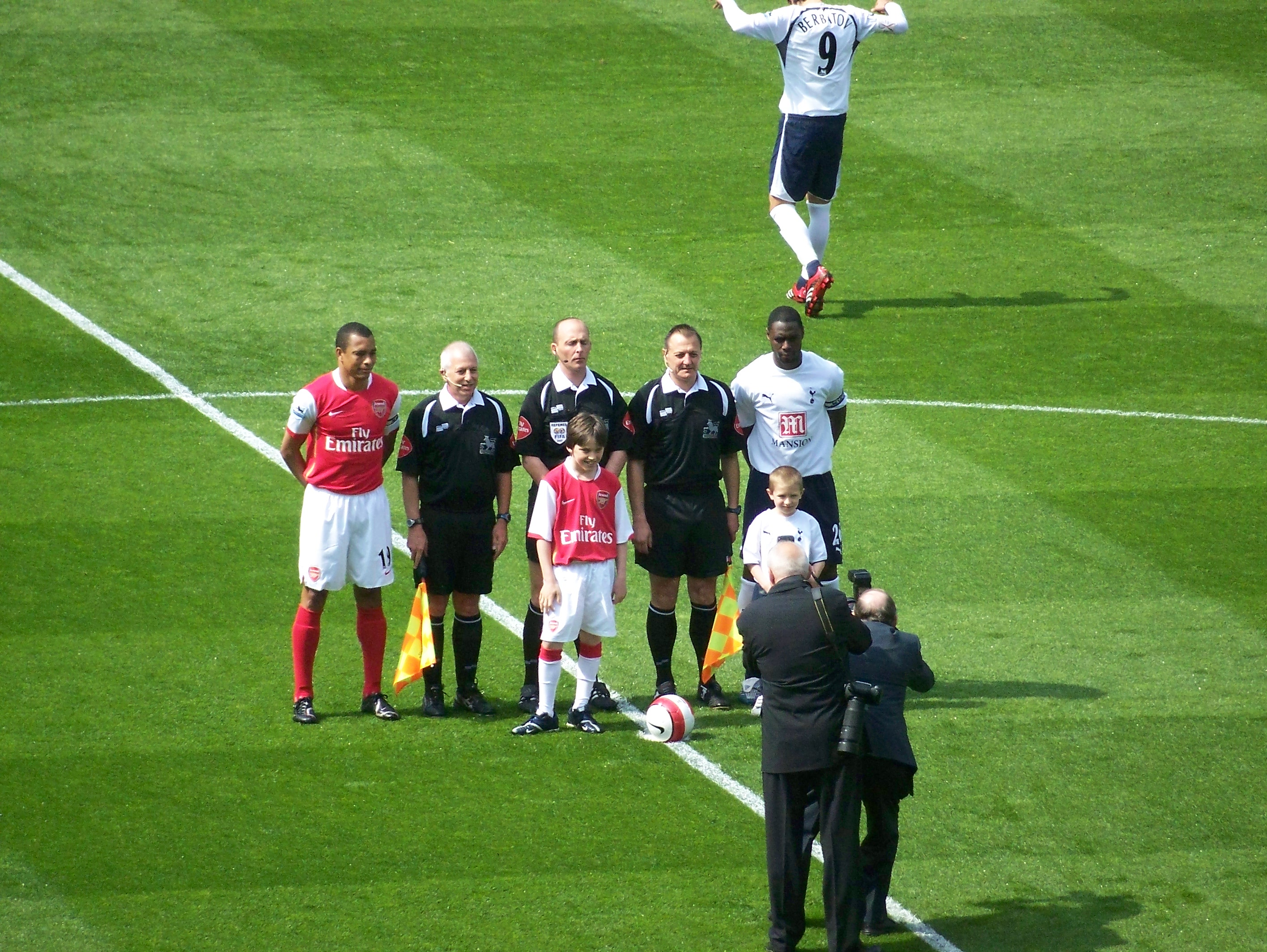
- Gilberto Silva (far left) and Ledley King (far right), captaining Arsenal and Tottenham respectively at White Hart Lane, on 21 April 2007. The match ended in a 2–2 draw.
- Location: North London
- Teams: Arsenal; Tottenham Hotspur
- First meeting: 15 January 1921; Football League First Division; Tottenham Hotspur 2–1 Arsenal
- Latest meeting: 22 February 2026; Premier League; Tottenham Hotspur 1–4 Arsenal
- Next meeting: 5 December 2026; Premier League; Tottenham Hotspur v Arsenal
- Stadiums: Emirates Stadium (Arsenal); Tottenham Hotspur Stadium (Tottenham Hotspur)

Statistics
- Total meetings: 199
- Most wins: Arsenal (86)
- Most player appearances: David O'Leary (Arsenal) (35)
- Top scorer: Harry Kane (Tottenham) (14 goals)
- All-time series: Arsenal: 86; Drawn: 52; Spurs: 61
- Largest victory: Tottenham Hotspur 0–6 Arsenal; Football League First Division (6 March 1935)

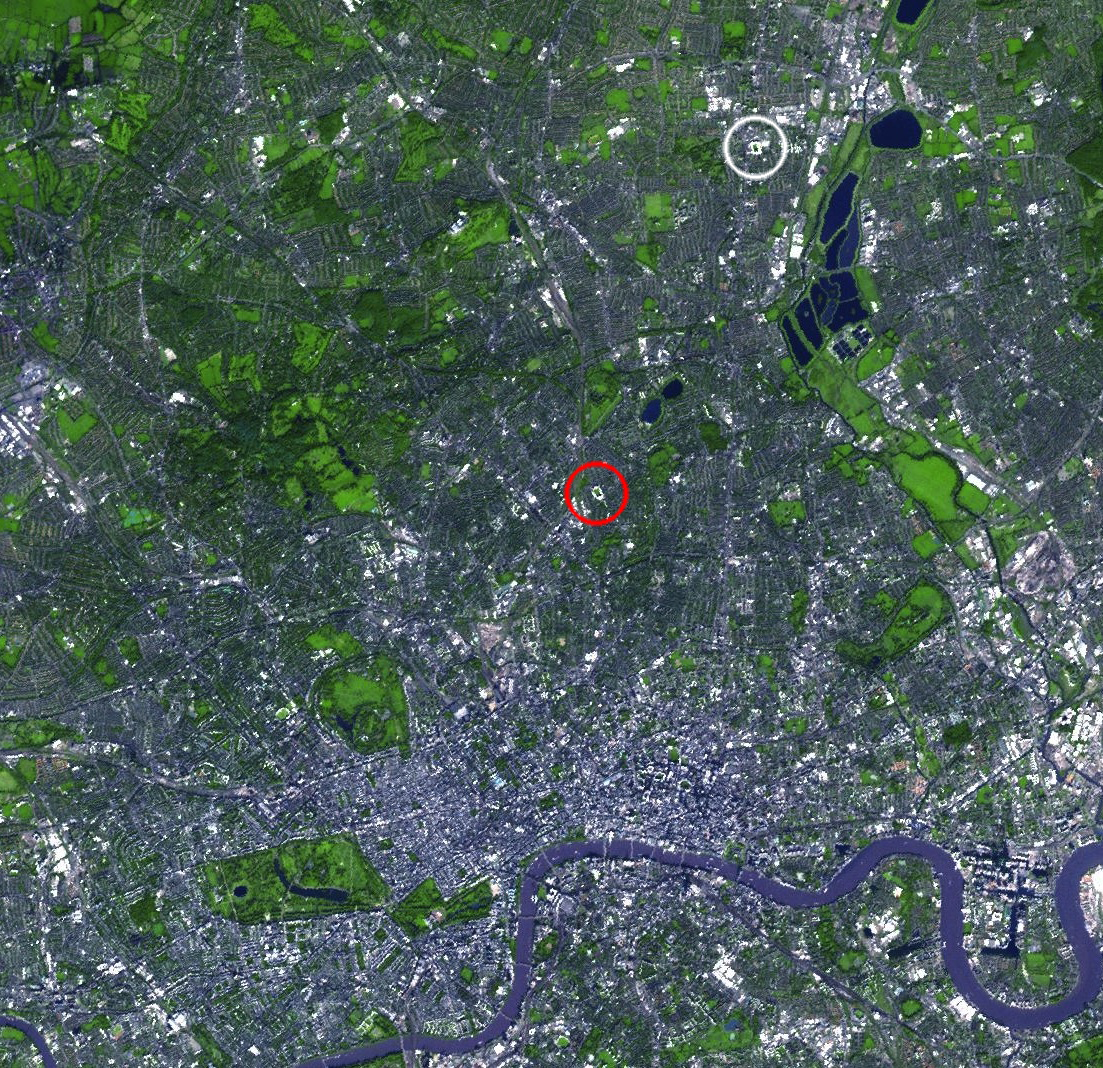
Satellite map of North London showing locations of Arsenal's old Highbury Stadium (red) and Tottenham's old White Hart Lane ground (white)

The North London derby is the meeting of the association football clubs Arsenal and Tottenham Hotspur, both of which are based in North London, England. Fans of both clubs consider the other to be their main rivals, and the derby is one of the most watched derbies in the world. Although the two teams first played each other in 1887, the rivalry did not begin until 1913 when Arsenal moved their ground to North London from Woolwich, south of the River Thames.

As of 22 February 2026, 199 games have been played between the two teams since their first game in the Football League in 1909, with 86 wins for Arsenal, 62 wins for Tottenham and 52 games drawn. When games played before both joined the Football League are included, 213 games have been played, with Arsenal winning 91, Tottenham 68, and 55 drawn.

Notable matches of the North London derby include the games in which Arsenal won the league at White Hart Lane in 1971 and their invincible campaign in 2004, Tottenham beating Arsenal 5–0 at home in 1983 and Arsenal winning by the same score away in 1978, and Tottenham beating Arsenal 3–1 at the semi-final of the 1990–91 FA Cup, which they went on to win. The highest-scoring game in the North London derby is the 5–4 win by Arsenal at White Hart Lane in November 2004. The fixture's top scorer is Harry Kane with fourteen goals, having overtaken Bobby Smith and Emmanuel Adebayor, who have ten goals each.

Arsenal play their home games at the Emirates Stadium in Islington, while Tottenham Hotspur are based at the Tottenham Hotspur Stadium in the neighbouring borough of Haringey. The two stadiums are 4 miles (6.4 km) apart.

== History ==
=== Early matches ===
The first meeting between the two teams was a friendly on 19 November 1887, when Arsenal were located in Plumstead (then part of Kent but now in Greater London), and known as Royal Arsenal. The match, played at Spurs' ground at Tottenham Marshes, was abandoned 15 minutes before it was due to end "owing to darkness" with Spurs leading 2–1. The first completed match between the two teams was held the following February in Plumstead; Tottenham could only field nine players, and were beaten 6–2.

The two teams competed together in the United League starting in the 1896–97 season. The first meeting in competition was on 2 November 1896. Arsenal won 2–1.

Another notable match was in 1898 played at the Spurs ground at Northumberland Park. The match with the then Woolwich Arsenal was attended by a record crowd of 15,000, and the refreshment stand collapsed when spectators climbed up onto its roof in the overcrowded ground, resulting in some injuries and prompting Spurs to start looking for a new ground. The next year the club moved a short distance to what would become known as the White Hart Lane ground. The first League match between the clubs was in the First Division, on 4 December 1909; Arsenal won 1–0.

=== Beginning of rivalry ===
The traditional first kits of Arsenal (left) and Tottenham Hotspur (right).

However, a proper rivalry between the two teams did not begin until 1913, when Arsenal moved from the Manor Ground, Plumstead to Arsenal Stadium, Highbury, just four miles from Tottenham's White Hart Lane, a move resented and opposed by Tottenham as they considered Highbury their territory. The move made Arsenal Tottenham's nearest neighbours and thus began a natural local rivalry. The two teams first faced each other as north London rivals in a War Relief Fund friendly on 22 August 1914 at White Hart Lane. Although Arsenal were in the Second Division and Tottenham in the First, Arsenal won 5–1. They would go on to meet regularly during World War I in the London Combination, the regional wartime competition of the time.

The rivalry escalated in 1919 when, after World War I, the First Division was to be expanded by two teams, and the League held a meeting of the clubs to decide the two clubs by means of a vote. 19th-placed Chelsea, who would otherwise have been relegated, were allowed to stay and thus they took the first of the two spots. The second spot could have been awarded to 20th-placed Tottenham, or Barnsley, who had finished third in the Second Division, but Arsenal (along with four other clubs) also bid for the place, despite finishing sixth in Division Two (although an error in the calculation of goal average meant Arsenal had actually finished fifth, which was corrected by the Football League in 1980).

After an endorsement by League president and chairman of Liverpool John McKenna on account of their longer membership of the League, Arsenal won the vote by eighteen votes to Spurs' eight (Barnsley got five, Wolves four, Nottingham Forest three, Birmingham two and Hull City one) and were thus elected to the First Division. The decision infuriated Tottenham and their supporters. It has been frequently alleged that Arsenal chairman Sir Henry Norris used underhand dealings in order to bring this about, although nothing has been proven. Tottenham themselves had been elected to join the Football League Second Division eleven years prior after finishing 7th in the 1907–08 Southern League, but it involved entirely separate leagues that did not have automatic right to move between them. Tottenham were initially unsuccessful in their attempt to join the Football League, and only narrowly won election to the Second Division after Stoke resigned from the league for financial reasons.

Despite the setback, Tottenham were soon promoted back into the top flight after taking the 1919–20 Second Division title, and the derby began to be regularly contested. The first fully competitive derby match after Arsenal's 1913 move to north London was a First Division match that finished 2–1 to Tottenham, on 15 January 1921 at White Hart Lane. The early matches between the two were noted for their bitterness - a particularly vicious match in September 1922 led to both clubs being censured by the Football Association and threatened with being forced to play behind closed doors.

Tottenham played in the Second Division between the periods of 1928 and 1933, as well as 1935 to 1950, which naturally led to a drop in the number of matches between the two clubs in this period and a cooling of passions. In 1935 Arsenal registered its biggest ever win over Spurs in a 6–0 rout away at White Hart Lane. This 6–0 result remains the largest margin of victory in the derby. Relations between the two clubs improved somewhat after the Second World War, after Tottenham allowed Arsenal to play their home matches at White Hart Lane while Highbury was requisitioned as an ARP station and subsequently bombed. The two sides met in the FA Cup for the first time in the 1948–49 season, when Arsenal won a third round tie 3–0.

=== 1950–present ===
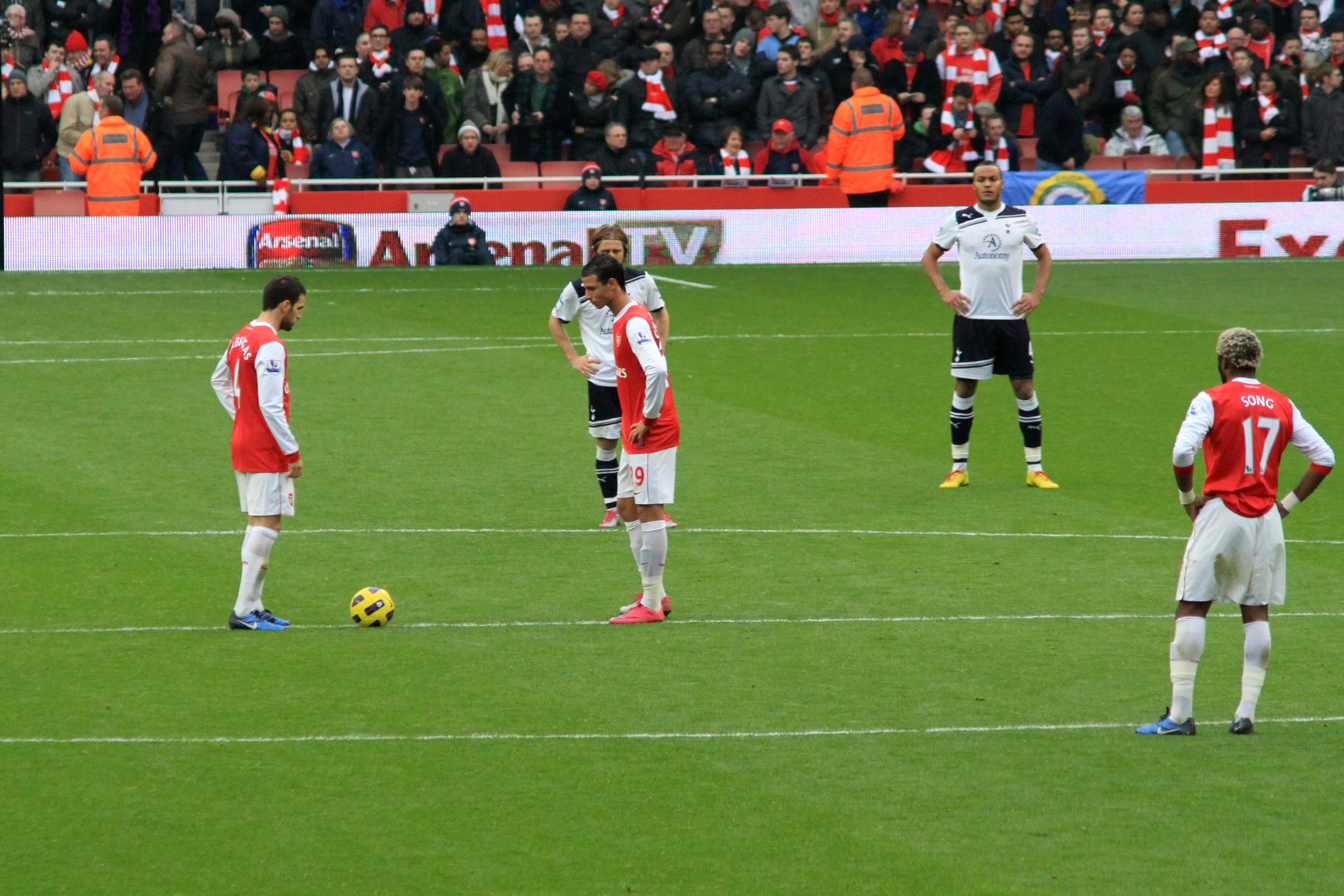
Kick-off for the second half at the north London derby, 20 November 2010. Arsenal were 2–0 up at this point, but were beaten 3–2.

Since 1950, there has only been one season (that of 1977–78) where Tottenham and Arsenal have not been in the same division, meaning fixtures between the two are regular. This has maintained the rivalry to the present day and there have been many notable matches. Several times the course of a title or the journey to a cup final has relied upon the outcome of a derby match. As with any major football rivalry, gloating and banter between the two sets of fans, many of whom work and even live together, is commonplace. Players who transfer between the two teams receive a bad reception from their former fans; an example was defender Sol Campbell, who was nicknamed "Judas" by Tottenham fans after he crossed the divide in 2001.

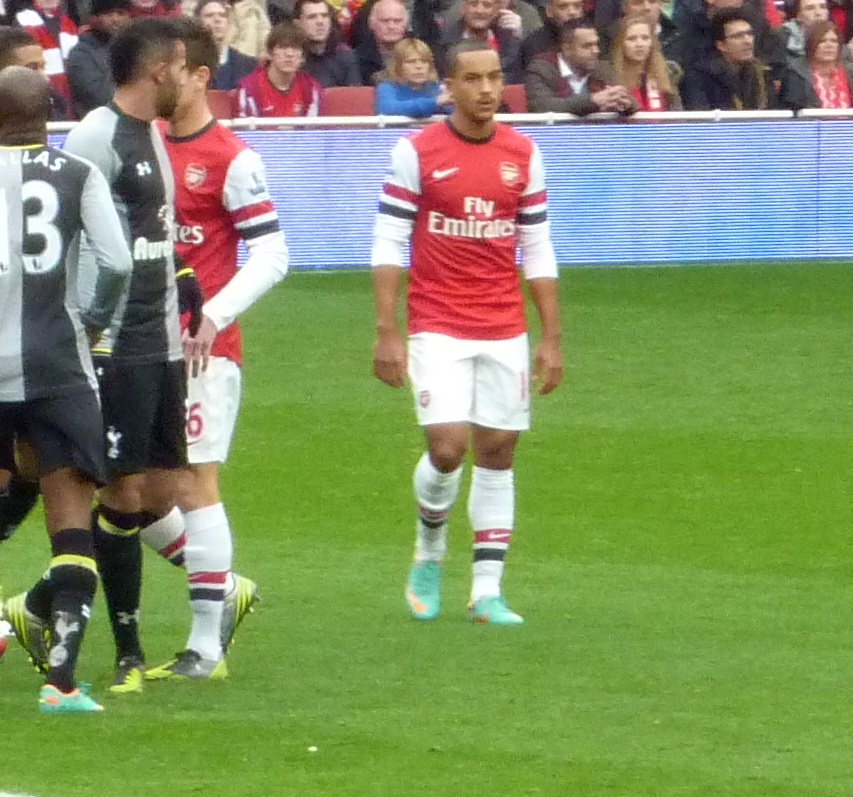
Arsenal's Theo Walcott and William Gallas of Tottenham in the North London Derby of November 2012 which Arsenal won 5–2.

Arsenal's Theo Walcott, after picking up a knee injury in the 83rd minute of a FA Cup third round tie against Tottenham in January 2014, was pelted with a hail of coins and plastic bottles whilst coming off the field on a stretcher by Tottenham fans at the Emirates Stadium. Walcott subsequently made a gesture on the stretcher to the Tottenham fans indicating the 2–0 scoreline, which remained the final result. An investigation was eventually made with regard to the perpetrators of the incident by the authorities.

On 30 April 2017, Tottenham beat Arsenal 2–0 in the final North London Derby at White Hart Lane. This result guaranteed Tottenham finishing above Arsenal in the league for the first time in 22 seasons. Tottenham would then achieve a streak of six consecutive finishes above their rivals (from 2016–17 to 2021–22). On 31 July 2025, the first North London derby was held outside of the United Kingdom at Kai Tak Sports Park in Hong Kong as part of their pre-season fixtures. The match was won by Tottenham.

== Fans ==
Tottenham Hotspur playing Arsenal in the 2009–10 Premier League at White Hart Lane. Tottenham fans are singing a chant, which condemns Sol Campbell and praises Ledley King. Sol Campbell had been targeted by Tottenham fans since he had moved from Spurs to their north London rivals in 2001.

Both Arsenal's and Tottenham's fan bases are multi-ethnic, due to the racial diversity in London. In 2002, Arsenal had 7.7% of their fans calling themselves non-white British, rising to 14% in 2008, the highest in the league in these supporter surveys. Around 9% of Tottenham fans were non-White in 2008. Both clubs also have extensive fan bases throughout the UK and the rest of the world. Arsenal fans call themselves "Gooners", a term that is derived from the club's nickname "Gunners", which is itself a reference to Arsenal's origins as a munitions factory team.

Tottenham fans call themselves "yids". Due to the historical support from the Jewish communities in North and East London, Tottenham once had a significant number of Jewish fans; it was estimated that around 10,000 or a third of the club's fans in the 1930s were Jewish. Due to this historical association, fans of many other clubs from the 1960s onwards have directed antisemitic chants at Spurs fans. Tottenham no longer has a greater number of Jewish fans than other major London clubs such as Arsenal (Jewish support for Arsenal started to increase in the 1930s); an estimate put the number of Jewish fans at Tottenham as at most 5%, about the same number as Arsenal, but the antisemitic chants against Tottenham fans persisted. In an attempt to draw the sting from these chants, Tottenham fans (whether Jewish or not) adopted the words "yid" and "yiddo" for themselves and thereby turned a pejorative into a term of pride and belonging. There is, however, still some controversy over the use of "yid" or "yiddo". Tottenham are considered the club of North-East London in boroughs such as Haringey, Waltham Forest, Redbridge, Enfield and Hackney, whereas Arsenal are more representative of North-West London in Islington, Camden, Brent, Harrow and Barnet. A 2003 online survey found that Arsenal supporters most dislike Tottenham, and that Tottenham fans see Arsenal as their main rival.

Arsenal fans have a celebration day related to the north London rivalry called St. Totteringham's Day, which is the day in the season when Tottenham cannot mathematically finish above Arsenal on the league table. Tottenham fans had long before declared 14 April to be St. Hotspur day in honour of Tottenham's 3–1 win over Arsenal in the 1991 FA Cup semi-final. St. Hotspur Day was also celebrated on 14 April 2010, when Tottenham beat Arsenal 2–1.

== Results ==
=== Premier League ===
==== Arsenal vs Tottenham Hotspur ====
Venue	Date	Score	Home goalscorers	Away goalscorers	Attendance
Highbury	11 May 1993	1–3	Dickov 52'	Sheringham 39', Hendry 46', 78'	26,393
Highbury	6 December 1993	1–1	Wright 65'	Anderton 25'	35,669
Highbury	29 April 1995	1–1	Wright 61', (pen.)	Klinsmann 74'	38,337
Highbury	15 April 1996	0–0			38,273
Highbury	24 November 1996	3–1	Wright 28' (pen.), Adams 87', Bergkamp 89'	Sinton 57'	38,264
Highbury	30 August 1997	0–0			38,102
Highbury	14 November 1998	0–0			38,278
Highbury	19 March 2000	2–1	Armstrong 20' (o.g.), Henry 45' (pen.)	Armstrong 3'	38,131
Highbury	31 March 2001	2–0	Pires 70', Henry 87'		38,121
Highbury	6 April 2002	2–1	Ljungberg 25', Lauren 86' (pen.)	Sheringham 81' (pen.)	38,186
Highbury	16 November 2002	3–0	Henry 13', Ljungberg 55', Wiltord 71'		38,152
Highbury	8 November 2003	2–1	Pires 69', Ljungberg 79'	Anderton 5'	38,101
Highbury	25 April 2005	1–0	Reyes 22'		38,147
Highbury	22 April 2006	1–1	Henry 84'	Keane 66'	38,326
Emirates Stadium	2 December 2006	3–0	Adebayor 20', Gilberto 42' (pen.), 72' (pen.)		60,115
Emirates Stadium	22 December 2007	2–1	Adebayor 47', Bendtner 75'	Berbatov 65'	60,087
Emirates Stadium	29 October 2008	4–4	Silvestre 37', Gallas 46, Adebayor 64', van Persie 68'	Bentley 13', Bent 65', Jenas 89', Lennon 90+4'	60,043
Emirates Stadium	31 October 2009	3–0	Van Persie 42', 60', Fàbregas 43'		60,103
Emirates Stadium	20 November 2010	2–3	Nasri 9', Chamakh 27'	Bale 50', Van der Vaart 67' (pen.), Kaboul 86'	60,102
Emirates Stadium	26 February 2012	5–2	Sagna 40', Van Persie 43', Rosický 51', Walcott 65', 68'	Saha 4', Adebayor 34' (pen.)	60,106
Emirates Stadium	17 November 2012	5–2	Mertesacker 24', Podolski 42', Giroud 45+1', Cazorla 60', Walcott 90+1'	Adebayor 10', Bale 71'	60,111
Emirates Stadium	1 September 2013	1–0	Giroud 23'		60,071
Emirates Stadium	27 September 2014	1–1	Oxlade-Chamberlain 74'	Chadli 56'	59,900
Emirates Stadium	8 November 2015	1–1	Gibbs 77'	Kane 32'	60,060
Emirates Stadium	6 November 2016	1–1	Wimmer 42' (o.g.)	Kane 51' (pen.)	60,039
Emirates Stadium	18 November 2017	2–0	Mustafi 36', Sánchez 41'		59,530
Emirates Stadium	2 December 2018	4–2	Aubameyang 10' (pen.), 56', Lacazette 74', Torreira 77'	Dier 30', Kane 34' (pen.)	59,973
Emirates Stadium	1 September 2019	2–2	Lacazette 45+1', Aubameyang 71'	Eriksen 10', Kane 40' (pen.)	60,333
Emirates Stadium	14 March 2021	2–1	Ødegaard 44', Lacazette 64' (pen.)	Lamela 33'	0
Emirates Stadium	26 September 2021	3–1	Smith Rowe 12', Aubameyang 27', Saka 34'	Son 79'	59,919
Emirates Stadium	1 October 2022	3–1	Partey 20', Gabriel Jesus 49', Xhaka 67'	Kane 31' (pen.)	60,278
Emirates Stadium	24 September 2023	2–2	Romero 26' (o.g.), Saka 54' (pen.)	Son 42', 55'	60,156
Emirates Stadium	15 January 2025	2–1	Solanke 40' (o.g.), Trossard 44'	Son 25'	60,287
Emirates Stadium	23 November 2025	4–1	Trossard 36', Eze 41', 46', 76'	Richarlison 55'	60,345

==== Tottenham Hotspur vs Arsenal ====
Venue	Date	Score	Home goalscorers	Away goalscorers	Attendance
White Hart Lane	12 December 1992	1–0	Allen 20'		33,707
White Hart Lane	16 August 1993	0–1		Wright 87'	28,355
White Hart Lane	2 January 1995	1–0	Popescu 22'		28,747
White Hart Lane	18 November 1995	2–1	Sheringham 29', Armstrong 54'	Bergkamp 14'	32,894
White Hart Lane	15 February 1997	0–0			33,039
White Hart Lane	28 December 1997	1–1	Nielsen 28'	Parlour 62'	29,610
White Hart Lane	5 May 1999	1–3	Anderton 43'	Petit 17', Anelka 33', Kanu 85'	36,019
White Hart Lane	7 November 1999	2–1	Iversen 7', Sherwood 20'	Vieira 39'	36,085
White Hart Lane	18 December 2000	1–1	Rebrov 31'	Vieira 89'	36,062
White Hart Lane	17 November 2001	1–1	Poyet 90'	Pires 81'	36,049
White Hart Lane	15 December 2002	1–1	Ziege 11'	Pires 45' (pen.)	36,076
White Hart Lane	25 April 2004	2–2	Redknapp 62', Keane 90+4' (pen.)	Vieira 3', Pires 35'	36,097
White Hart Lane	13 November 2004	4–5	Naybet 36', Defoe 61', King 73', Kanouté 88'	Henry 45+1', Lauren 55' (pen.), Vieira 60', Ljungberg 69, Pires 81'	36,095
White Hart Lane	29 October 2005	1–1	King 17'	Pires 77'	36,154
White Hart Lane	21 April 2007	2–2	Keane 30', Jenas 90+5'	Touré 64', Adebayor 78'	36,050
White Hart Lane	15 September 2007	1–3	Bale 15'	Adebayor 65', 90+4', Fàbregas 80'	36,053
White Hart Lane	8 February 2009	0–0			36,021
White Hart Lane	14 April 2010	2–1	Rose 10', Bale 47'	Bendtner 85'	36,041
White Hart Lane	20 April 2011	3–3	Van der Vaart 7', 70' (pen.), Huddlestone 44'	Walcott 5', Nasri 12', Van Persie 40'	36,138
White Hart Lane	2 October 2011	2–1	Van der Vaart 40', Walker 73'	Ramsey 51'	36,274
White Hart Lane	3 March 2013	2–1	Bale 37', Lennon 39'	Mertesacker 51'	36,170
White Hart Lane	16 March 2014	0–1		Rosický 2'	35,711
White Hart Lane	7 February 2015	2–1	Kane 55', 86'	Özil 11'	35,659
White Hart Lane	5 March 2016	2–2	Alderweireld 60', Kane 62'	Ramsey 39', Sánchez 76'	35,762
White Hart Lane	30 April 2017	2–0	Alli 55', Kane 58' (pen.)		31,811
Wembley Stadium	10 February 2018	1–0	Kane 49'		83,222
Wembley Stadium	2 March 2019	1–1	Kane 74' (pen.)	Ramsey 16'	81,332
Tottenham Hotspur Stadium	12 July 2020	2–1	Son 19', Alderweireld 81'	Lacazette 16'	0
Tottenham Hotspur Stadium	6 December 2020	2–0	Son 13', Kane 45+1'		2,000
Tottenham Hotspur Stadium	12 May 2022	3–0	Kane 22' (pen.), 37', Son 47'		62,027
Tottenham Hotspur Stadium	15 January 2023	0–2		Lloris 14' (o.g.), Ødegaard 36'	61,870
Tottenham Hotspur Stadium	28 April 2024	2–3	Romero 64', Son 87' (pen.)	Højbjerg 15' (o.g.), Saka 27', Havertz 38'	61,554
Tottenham Hotspur Stadium	15 September 2024	0–1		Gabriel 64'	61,645
Tottenham Hotspur Stadium	22 February 2026	1–4	Kolo Muani 34'	Eze 32', 61', Gyökeres 47', 90+4'	61,439

==== Fixture top scorers in the derby (Premier League era) ====
Players in bold represent those who are currently playing for Arsenal or Tottenham.

Rank	Player	Club(s)	Goals
1	(England) Harry Kane	Tottenham Hotspur	14
2	(Togo) Emmanuel Adebayor	Arsenal, Tottenham Hotspur	10
3	(France) Robert Pires	Arsenal	8
3	(South Korea) Son Heung-min	Tottenham Hotspur	8
5	(Wales) Gareth Bale	Tottenham Hotspur	5
5	(France) Thierry Henry	Arsenal	5
5	(Netherlands) Robin van Persie	Arsenal	5
5	(England) **Eberechi Eze**	Arsenal	5
9	(Gabon) Pierre-Emerick Aubameyang	Arsenal	4
9	(Sweden) Freddie Ljungberg	Arsenal	4
9	(Netherlands) Rafael van der Vaart	Tottenham Hotspur	4
9	(France) Patrick Vieira	Arsenal	4
9	(England) Theo Walcott	Arsenal	4
9	(England) Ian Wright	Arsenal	4

=== Cup semi-finals and title deciders ===
Although Arsenal and Tottenham have never met in a major cup final, there have been North London derby matches that have significantly contributed to one of the two clubs winning a trophy, such as semi-finals and title deciders. These include:

- **Tottenham 0–1 Arsenal** (3 May 1971): The final match of the 1970–71 league campaign, with Arsenal needing a win or a goalless draw to take the First Division title (a score draw would have meant Leeds United won on goal average). The game was tight with few real chances on goal, until the very end. With three minutes to go, John Radford's shot forced Pat Jennings into a good save; George Armstrong got to the rebound and chipped the ball across goal and Ray Kennedy headed home the winner. Spurs desperately tried to get a goal back but to no avail; Arsenal held on to win the title (the first half of the Double that season).
- **Tottenham 1–2 Arsenal** (4 March 1987): Arsenal and Spurs had drawn 2–2 on aggregate in the League Cup semi-finals; with no away goals rule in force, the match was replayed at Spurs' home ground of White Hart Lane. Spurs went 1–0 up through Clive Allen but Arsenal substitute Ian Allinson equalised and David Rocastle scrambled home the winner to send Arsenal through to the Final, where they won their first trophy since 1979.
- **Tottenham 3–1 Arsenal** (14 April 1991 at Wembley): The first FA Cup semi-final between the two sides. Arsenal were chasing a second Double, but Tottenham's Paul Gascoigne scored after just five minutes with a free kick from 30 yards out. Gary Lineker made it two, and although Alan Smith pulled one back for the Gunners before half-time, Lineker scored again in the second half to seal the result. Arsenal's Double dream was dashed, though they still won the League that season; Spurs lifted the Cup a month later. Known as St Hotspur Day for Tottenham fans.
- **Arsenal 1–0 Tottenham** (4 April 1993 at Wembley): The second FA Cup semi-final between the two, in which Arsenal sought revenge over their North London rivals for the 3–1 semi-final defeat two years earlier. Tony Adams scored with a header from a Paul Merson free kick for the Gunners in the 79th minute; Arsenal prevailed despite Lee Dixon's sending-off, and went on to win the FA Cup in May and complete the first ever domestic cup double.
- **Arsenal 2–1 Tottenham** (8 April 2001 at Old Trafford): The third FA Cup semi-final between the two. Gary Doherty gave Spurs the lead, before Patrick Vieira equalised for Arsenal. Robert Pires scored a second half winner to send Arsenal through to the first FA Cup final to be played outside England, where they lost 2–1 to Liverpool in Cardiff.
- **Tottenham 2–2 Arsenal** (25 April 2004): Arsenal were unbeaten in the Premier League and only needed a point to secure the title. The Gunners were 2–0 up after 35 minutes thanks to Patrick Vieira and Robert Pires' goals. A famous win looked to be on the cards, but Spurs restored some pride by denying Arsenal victory; in the second half Jamie Redknapp scored from long-range, then Robbie Keane converted a 90th-minute penalty to earn the draw. Arsenal thus won the title at their rivals' home ground for the second time.
- **Arsenal 3–1 (a.e.t.) Tottenham** (31 January 2007): Arsenal booked their place in the 2007 League Cup final, for the first time since winning the competition in 1993, after this extra-time victory. The teams drew the first leg 2–2 at White Hart Lane where Tottenham threw away a 2–0 first half lead, eventually drawing the game. The return leg game was goalless until the 77th minute when Emmanuel Adebayor gave Arsenal the lead, before Mido equalised for Tottenham five minutes from time. Jérémie Aliadière restored Arsenal's lead in the 105th minute and the game was eventually won by Arsenal after a 113th minute own goal by Tottenham's Pascal Chimbonda, sending Arsenal through to the final, 5–3 on aggregate. Arsenal, however, would eventually lose the final to Chelsea.
- **Tottenham 5–1 Arsenal** (22 January 2008): Tottenham's first victory over Arsenal since November 1999, in the second leg of the League Cup semi-final; the teams had drawn 1–1 at the Emirates Stadium. Tottenham were 2–0 up by half time with Jermaine Jenas' strike and a Nicklas Bendtner own goal. After half-time, Spurs added two more from Robbie Keane and Aaron Lennon; Emmanuel Adebayor pulled one back for Arsenal, before Steed Malbranque scored a fifth goal in injury time to put Tottenham into the 2008 League Cup final. Spurs went on to lift the trophy.
- **Tottenham 2–1 Arsenal** (14 April 2010): Spurs beat Arsenal 2−1 at White Hart Lane, goals by Danny Rose and Gareth Bale, to end the Gunners' hopes of winning the Premier League.

== Statistics and records ==
Side-by-side comparison of Arsenal's and Tottenham Hotspur's final league positions 1894 to the present

As of 15 January 2025, there have been 197 competitive first-class meetings between the two teams since the first league meeting in 1909, of which Arsenal have won 84 and Tottenham 61. The most goals in one game were scored in the closely contested 5–4 Arsenal victory at White Hart Lane on 13 November 2004. The biggest winning margin was a 6–0 away win by Arsenal on 6 March 1935. Tottenham have twice won 5–0 (25 December 1911 and 4 April 1983) and Arsenal once (23 December 1978), with all three fixtures taking place at White Hart Lane. Arsenal also won by 5–2 margins both in February and November 2012 home at the Emirates.

Tottenham's record for goals scored against Arsenal is 14 goals by Harry Kane, with Bobby Smith scoring 10 goals followed by Billy Minter with nine goals. Arsenal's record is held jointly by Emmanuel Adebayor, Alan Sunderland and Robert Pires, with eight goals each. Adebayor also formerly shared the record for most goals by a player in the North London derby with ten: eight scored for Arsenal and two for Tottenham. Arsenal's long-time defender David O'Leary holds the record for most North London derbies played with 35, while Gary Mabbutt and Steve Perryman shared the corresponding record for Spurs, with 31.

Terry Dyson is the only Spurs player to score a hat-trick in a first-class derby game, having done so on 26 August 1961 in a 4–3 win for Spurs. The Arsenal players to have done so are Ted Drake (20 October 1934), Alan Sunderland (23 December 1978) and Eberechi Eze (23 November 2025).

=== Results ===
As of 22 February 2026 (count starting 1909)

Competition	Matches played	Arsenal wins	Draws	Spurs wins	Arsenal goals	Spurs goals
League	178	75	48	55	281	239
FA Cup	6	4	0	2	9	5
League Cup	14	7	3	4	21	19
Community Shield	1	0	1	0	0	0
Total	199	86	52	61	311	263

== Crossing the divide ==
Due to the rivalry between the clubs, relatively few players have played for both Arsenal and Tottenham since 1913. The first player to have played for both clubs, however, predated the start of the rivalry; Bill Julian joined Royal Arsenal in 1889 and Tottenham in 1894. Many other players played for both clubs before the start of the rivalry, including Charles Ambler, Arthur Elliott, Thomas Fitchie, Tom Pratt, Peter Kyle, and George Payne. A number of players had joined both clubs in the 20th century, but it was only in the 1960s that Laurie Brown became the first player to have played in the North London Derby for both clubs. The players who have played for both since 1919 when the rivalry escalated are listed below.

=== Arsenal, then Tottenham ===
Name	Pos	Arsenal			Tottenham		
Name	Pos	Career	Apps	Goals	Career	Apps	Goals
(England) Jimmy Brain	FW	1924–31	232	139	1931–35	34	10
(England) Laurie Brown	DF	1961–64	109	2	1964–66	65	3
(England) David Jenkins	MF	1966–68	25	9	1968–70	17	2
(England) Rohan Ricketts	MF	2001–02	1	0	2002–05	36	2
(England) David Bentley	MF	1997–2006	8	1	2008–11	41	3
(France) William Gallas	DF	2006–10	101	12	2010–13	61	1
(Togo) Emmanuel Adebayor	FW	2006–09	143	62	2011–15	106	41

Former Arsenal winger Joe Hulme managed Tottenham Hotspur between 1945 and 1949. George Graham was firstly an Arsenal player, then managed the Gunners between 1986 and 1994, before later taking up the reins at White Hart Lane between 1998 and 2001.

Clive Allen played three matches in Arsenal's 1980–81 pre-season friendly campaign, although never played a competitive league match for them.

Jamie O'Hara was a youth player at Arsenal before joining Tottenham. However, he did not play a single game for Arsenal.

Ron Piper was an amateur at Arsenal without playing a senior match before joining Tottenham in October 1960.

Tottenham all-time record goalscorer Harry Kane, also the record scorer in North London Derby fixtures, briefly played for Arsenal's youth academy as an eight-year-old, being released after a single season.

=== Tottenham, then Arsenal ===
Name	Pos	Tottenham			Arsenal		
Name	Pos	Career	Apps	Goals	Career	Apps	Goals
(England) George Hunt	FW	1930–37	198	138	1937–38	21	3
(England) Freddie Cox	RW	1938–49	105	18	1949–53	94	16
(England) Vic Groves	MF	1952–53	4	3	1955–64	201	37
(Scotland) Jimmy Robertson	RW	1964–68	181	31	1968–70	59	8
(England) Steve Walford	DF	1975–77	1	1	1977–81	98	4
(Scotland) Willie Young	DF	1975–77	64	4	1977–81	237	19
(Northern Ireland) Pat Jennings	GK	1964–77, 1985–86	590	1	1977–85	327	0
(England) Sol Campbell	DF	1992–2001	315	15	2001–06, 2010	197	11

In addition, former Spurs player Herbert Chapman subsequently managed Arsenal from 1925 to 1934. Forward Billy Lane first played for Tottenham during 1922 and again from 1924 in a two-year stint at the club, but started in 1963 to feature as a scout for Arsenal. Former Gunner Terry Neill was Spurs's manager from 1974 to 1976, before he crossed back to manage Arsenal between 1976 and 1983.

Pat Holland was a reserve and youth team coach at Spurs from 1988 to 1995 and from 1997 to 2005 in a second spell with the club. Holland went on to take up the role of a coach at Arsenal's Academy in 2012. Holland left the role after less than two months for personal reasons, but has continued to feature for Arsenal as a scout.

Sol Campbell's 2001 transfer from Tottenham to Arsenal was a landmark move at the time, with Campbell going on to win two Premier League titles and three FA Cups with Arsenal. Campbell was a club captain at Tottenham.

=== Played for both teams in North London derby ===
The following players have played in at least one North London derby for both teams:

Appearances in the North London derby
Name	For Arsenal	For Tottenham
Laurie Brown	4	3
Sol Campbell	8	13
David Jenkins	2	1
Pat Jennings	9	23
Jimmy Robertson	1	8
Willie Young	8	3
William Gallas	6	2
Emmanuel Adebayor	9	4
Note: Jimmy Robertson and Emmanuel Adebayor are the only players to have scored for both teams in North London derbies.

== Clubs' honours ==
As of 16 August 2026, these are the football honours of Arsenal and Tottenham Hotspur:

Competition	Arsenal	Tottenham Hotspur
First Division / Premier League	14	2
FA Cup	14	8
EFL Cup	2	4
FA Community Shield	18	7
Domestic total	48	21
UEFA Cup Winners' Cup	1	1
UEFA Cup / Europa League	0	3
Inter-Cities Fairs Cup	1	0
European total	2	4
Grand total	50	25

In its present format, Arsenal have, as of 2026–27, qualified to play in the UEFA Champions League on 23 occasions and Tottenham seven, although Tottenham did achieve a fourth-place finish in the 2011–12 Premier League season but were denied a place in the Champions League due to Chelsea winning the Champions League. Arsenal were runners-up in both the 2005–06 and 2025–26 Champions League seasons, as were Tottenham in the 2018–19 Champions League. Prior to this, Arsenal qualified for the former European Cup on three occasions, while Tottenham did so once. Arsenal were unable to compete in the 1989–90 competition owing to a ban on English clubs following the Heysel Stadium disaster.

While the Inter-Cities Fairs Cup is recognised as the predecessor to the UEFA Cup, it was not organised by UEFA. Consequently, UEFA do not consider clubs' records in the Fairs Cup to be part of their European record. However, FIFA does view the competition as a major honour.

== Highest attendances ==
- Tottenham 1–0 Arsenal; 83,222 (10 February 2018); Wembley Stadium (Tottenham home)
- Tottenham 1–1 Arsenal; 81,332 (2 March 2019); Wembley Stadium (Tottenham home)
- Tottenham 3–1 Arsenal; 77,893 (14 April 1991); Wembley Stadium (neutral)
- Tottenham 0–1 Arsenal; 76,263 (4 April 1993); Wembley Stadium (neutral)
- Arsenal 1–1 Tottenham; 72,164 (29 September 1951), Highbury (Arsenal home)
- Tottenham 1–4 Arsenal; 69,821 (10 October 1953); White Hart Lane (Tottenham home)
- Tottenham 3–0 Arsenal; 62,027 (12 May 2022); Tottenham Hotspur Stadium (Tottenham home)
- Tottenham 0–1 Arsenal; 61,645 (15 September 2024); Tottenham Hotspur Stadium (Tottenham home)
- Tottenham 2–3 Arsenal; 61,554 (28 April 2024); Tottenham Hotspur Stadium (Tottenham home)

== See also ==
- London derbies
- Sports rivalry
- Local derbies in the United Kingdom
