= Davie Laird =

Scottish footballer

Davie Laird (born 11 February 1936) is a Scottish former footballer, who played for St Mirren and Northampton Town.
