= Jimmy Moran =

Scottish footballer (1935–2020)

Personal information
- Full name: James Moran
- Date of birth: 6 March 1935
- Place of birth: Cleland, Scotland
- Date of death: 1 January 2020 (aged 84)
- Position: Inside forward

Senior career*
Years	Team	Apps	(Gls)
- Wishaw Juniors
1956–1957	Leicester City	3	(1)
1957–1961	Norwich City	36	(17)
1961–1962	Northampton Town	24	(6)
1962–1963	Darlington	26	(6)
1963–1966	Workington	100	(22)
1966–1967	Lowestoft Town		
1967–19??	Great Yarmouth Town		

Managerial career
- 1968–19??: Great Yarmouth Town
- 1975–1976: Gorleston
- Lowestoft Town
- * Club domestic league appearances and goals

James Moran (6 March 1935 – 1 January 2020) was a Scottish footballer who scored 52 goals from 190 appearances in the Football League playing as an inside forward for Leicester City, Norwich City, Northampton Town, Darlington and Workington in the 1950s and 1960s. He began his career with Wishaw Juniors, and went on to play English non-league football in the Eastern Counties League for Lowestoft Town. In 1967, he joined Great Yarmouth Town, becoming manager for the 1968–69 season and leading the club to its first league title. He returned to Lowestoft, and later managed Gorleston from 1975 to 1976 and played for Bury Town, before becoming manager of Lowestoft. Moran died at the age of 84 in January 2020.
