= Peter Isaac =

English footballer

Personal information
- Full name: William Henry Isaac
- Date of birth: 16 May 1931 (age 95)
- Place of birth: Pontypridd, Wales
- Position: Goalkeeper

Senior career*
Years	Team	Apps	(Gls)
1953–1954	Stoke City	0	(0)
1956–1959	Barry Town		
1959–1960	Northampton Town	8	(0)
1960–1968	Hereford United	258	(0)
1968–1969	Worcester City		
1969	Kidderminster Harriers		
1969	Stourbridge		
Total		266	(0)

Managerial career
- 1979: Hereford United
- * Club domestic league appearances and goals

William Henry Isaac (born 16 May 1931) is a Welsh former professional footballer who played in the Football League for Northampton Town and had a long association with Hereford United.

== Playing career ==
Isaac was born in Pontypridd and was a keen sportsman in his youth playing Boxing and Rugby before settling on football after he was called up to the Welsh Schools to play England at Fratton Park. He joined Second Division side Stoke City in March 1953 but was soon called up for National service with the Royal Horse Guards and during his days in the army he won representative honours with the Northern Command. He re-joined Stoke on his demob but was unable to break into the first team and he returned to Wales joining Barry Town. His performances at Jenner Park caught the eye of several Football League clubs and in July 1959 he signed for Northampton Town, and although he was unable to force his way into the side on a regular basis featured 8 times for the Cobblers in the 1959–60 season. In the summer of 1960 the then Hereford manager Joe Wade persuaded Isaac to sign for the Bulls and in the next eight years he made a total of 353 appearances for the club, including 258 Southern League games. He spent a season with Worcester City and later played for Kidderminster Harriers and finally Stourbridge.

== Coaching career ==
Isaac returned to Edgar Street as trainer in July 1970 becoming John Charles' right-hand man, and when Hereford were elected to the Football League two years later he became a full-time member of the staff. He completed over 30 seasons at Edgar Street as player, coach, physiotherapist, trainer and caretaker-manager. He retired in 1992 and was awarded a testimonial against Manchester United.

== Career statistics ==
Club	Season	League			FA Cup		Total	
Club	Season	Division	Apps	Goals	Apps	Goals	Apps	Goals
Stoke City	1953–54	Second Division	0	0	0	0	0	0
Northampton Town	1959–60	Fourth Division	8	0	0	0	8	0
Career total			8	0	0	0	8	0
