= Ron Piper =

English footballer

Personal information
- Full name: Ronald David Piper
- Date of birth: 16 March 1943 (age 83)
- Place of birth: Cresswell, England
- Position: Inside forward

Senior career*
Years	Team	Apps	(Gls)
1960–1963	Tottenham Hotspur	1	(0)
1966–1967	Wimbledon	8	(0)
- * Club domestic league appearances and goals

Ronald David Piper (born 16 March 1943 in Cresswell) is an English former professional footballer who played for Tottenham Hotspur.

== Playing career ==
Piper began his career as an amateur with Arsenal. The inside forward joined Tottenham Hotspur in October 1960. Piper made just one appearance for Tottenham Hotspur in the final match of the 1962/63 season at Blackburn Rovers. After leaving White Hart Lane Piper played for Guildford City.
