= Laurie Brown (footballer) =

English footballer (1937–1998)

Personal information
- Full name: Laurence Brown
- Date of birth: 22 August 1937
- Place of birth: Shildon, England
- Date of death: 30 September 1998 (aged 61)
- Place of death: Newton Aycliffe, England
- Height: 6 ft 2 in (1.88 m)
- Positions: Centre forward; centre half

Senior career*
Years	Team	Apps	(Gls)
195?–195?	Shildon		
195?–195?	Woking		
195?–195?	Fulham	0	(0)
195?–1959	Bishop Auckland		
1959	Darlington	3	(0)
1959–1960	Bishop Auckland		
1960–1961	Northampton Town	33	(22)
1961–1964	Arsenal	109	(2)
1964–1966	Tottenham Hotspur	62	(3)
1966–1968	Norwich City	81	(2)
1968–1969	Bradford Park Avenue	36	(1)
1969–1970	Altrincham	21	(0)

International career
1960	England Amateur	3	(0)
1960	Great Britain Olympic	6	(0)

Managerial career
- 1968–1969: Bradford Park Avenue (player-manager)
- 1969–1970: Altrincham (player-manager)
- 1970–1971: King's Lynn
- Stockton
- * Club domestic league appearances and goals

Laurence Brown (22 August 1937 – 30 September 1998) was an English football player and manager. He made more than 300 appearances in the Football League, playing either at centre half or in the forward line for Darlington, Northampton Town, Arsenal, Tottenham Hotspur, Norwich City and Bradford Park Avenue. He was an England amateur international and captained Great Britain at the 1960 Summer Olympics. He was player-manager of Bradford in the League, and also had managerial spells with non-league clubs Altrincham, King's Lynn and Stockton.

== Life and career ==
Brown was born in Shildon, County Durham. He trained as a cabinet-maker, and worked at Doggarts department store in Bishop Auckland. He began his football career with Shildon, and appeared for Woking and Fulham, before returning to the north-east with Bishop Auckland, where his goalscoring – he contributed five in a 9–1 Northern League defeat of Ferryhill Athletic in November 1958 – attracted reported interest from major professional clubs.

In the last couple of months of the 1958–59 season, Brown made three appearances in the Football League Fourth Division as an amateur for Darlington before returning to Bishop Auckland. His goalscoring continued: in December 1959, he scored nine as the Durham FA beat their East Riding counterparts 11–0. In January 1960, the Daily Mirror reported that he was delaying turning professional with Manchester United because he wanted to play at the Olympics, which was then an amateur competition.

Brown made his debut for the England Amateur XI on 5 March 1960 against West Germany, and made his last appearance in September, shortly before he turned professional. He played in three Olympic qualifiers, and captained the Great Britain team in the Olympic tournament proper in Rome. The British team failed to progress to the knockout stage and came eighth overall.

On his return to England he signed as an amateur for Fourth Division Northampton Town. Although heavily linked with Newcastle United, he turned professional with Northampton in October 1960, and finished the season as the club's top scorer as they were promoted to the Third Division. By then, he had been switched from centre forward to centre half, and was to flourish in that position.

In May and June 1961, Brown was a member of a Football Association touring team that visited Malaya, Singapore, Hong Kong, New Zealand and the United States. In August, he was signed by First Division club Arsenal for £35,000, and immediately became a first-team regular. Brown amassed 109 appearances for the Gunners in two-and-a-half seasons, scoring twice. At the time, Arsenal were the less successful of the two north London clubs, and Brown made a surprising move to their deadly rivals, Tottenham Hotspur, in February 1964, for a fee of £40,000.

He became one of the few players to play for both clubs, and coincidentally made his Tottenham debut – the day after signing – in the North London derby against Arsenal. Spurs won 3–1, and Brown came close to scoring. The move was particularly controversial as he displaced Bobby Smith at centre forward. The gamble did not pay off, and Brown was dropped after nine matches. The following season, he re-appeared at centre half, where he remained until Tottenham bought Mike England to replace him. Brown made 62 League appearances for Tottenham.

In September 1966 he was sold to Norwich City, where he spent two seasons before finishing his career as player-manager of Bradford Park Avenue. He resigned as manager in October 1969 when a club director decided he would pick the team; Brown and 18 other players submitted transfer requests. He was given a free transfer in November, and was promptly appointed player-manager of Altrincham. Brown resigned in September 1970, and later had spells as manager of King's Lynn, from November to the end of the season, and Stockton.

Brown later ran a pub in Shildon and worked as a milk tanker driver. In his mid-50s he suffered a stroke from which he never fully recovered. He died in Newton Aycliffe in 1998 at the age of 61.
