= Mike Deakin =

English footballer (1933–2017)

Personal information
- Full name: Michael Raymond Frederick Deakin
- Date of birth: 25 October 1933
- Place of birth: Birmingham, England
- Date of death: 8 August 2017 (aged 83)
- Position: Centre forward

Youth career
- 1951: Wolverhampton Wanderers

Senior career*
Years	Team	Apps	(Gls)
?–1954	Bromsgrove Rovers		
1954–1959	Crystal Palace	143	(56)
1959–1961	Northampton Town	44	(31)
1961–1962	Aldershot	17	(5)
1962–?	Nuneaton Borough	?	(?)
- * Club domestic league appearances and goals

Michael Raymond Frederick Deakin (25 October 1933 – 8 August 2017) was an English professional footballer who played as a centre forward. He made 204 appearances in the Football League, for Crystal Palace, Northampton Town and Aldershot scoring 92 goals. He was the older brother of Alan Deakin who also played in the Football League; most notably for Aston Villa.

== Playing career ==
Deakin began his playing career as an amateur with Woverhampton Wanderers in 1951, before moving to Bromsgrove Rovers from where he became the first signing for Crystal Palace manager Cyril Spiers.

=== Crystal Palace ===
Deakin signed for Crystal Palace, then playing in the old Third Division South, on 12 November 1954. He made his debut the next day in an away 0–1 defeat to Brighton and Hove Albion and went on to make 19 Football League appearances that season, scoring four times. Over the next two seasons, Deakin appeared a total of 75 times in the League, scoring 24 goals. In 1957–8 and 1958–9, Deakin made 12 appearances (four goals) and 34 appearances (23 goals) respectively. After just three more appearances at the start of the next season (one goal), Deakin moved on, in October 1959, to Northampton Town, in exchange for Alan Woan.

=== Later career ===
Over the next two seasons, Deakin played 44 times for Northampton Town scoring 31 goals, helping the club to promotion from Division Four in 1960–61. However, at the end of that season he transferred to Aldershot, where he made 17 League appearances (5 goals) and in 1962 moved into non-league football with Nuneaton Town; at that time known as Nuneaton Borough.

Deakin died in 2017 aged 83.
