= 1984–85 Northampton Town F.C. season =

Northampton Town
1984–85 season
- Chairman: Neville Ronson (until April); Derek Banks (from April)
- Manager: Tony Barton (until April); Graham Carr (from April 14)
- Stadium: County Ground
- Division Four: 23rd (re-elected)
- FA Cup: Second round
- Milk Cup: First round
- Freight Rover Trophy: First round
- Top goalscorer: League: Ian Benjamin (18); All: Ian Benjamin (19)
- Highest home attendance: 4,815 vs VS Rugby
- Lowest home attendance: 942 vs Chester City
- Average home league attendance: 1,826

The 1984–85 season was Northampton Town's 88th season in their history and the eighth successive season in the Fourth Division. Alongside competing in Division Four, the club also participated in the FA Cup, League Cup and Associate Members' Cup.

== Players ==
As of match played 6 May 1985.

Name	Position	Nat.	Place of Birth	Date of Birth (Age)	Apps	Goals	Previous club	Date signed	Fee
Goalkeepers
Peter Gleasure	GK	(England)	Luton	8 October 1960 (aged 24)	116	0	Millwall	March 1983	
Defenders
Michael Barnes	CB	(England)	Reading	17 September 1963 (aged 21)	25	1	Reading	August 1984	
Mark Bushell	FB	(England)	Northampton	5 June 1968 (aged 16)	1	0	Apprentice	April 1985	N/A
Wakeley Gage	CB	(England)	Northampton	5 May 1958 (aged 27)	253	22	Desborough Town	October 1979	£8,000
Russell Lewis	CB	(Wales)	Blaengwynfi	15 September 1956 (aged 28)	104	6	Swindon Town	Summer 1983	
Brian Mundee	LB	(England)	Hammersmith	12 January 1964 (aged 21)	81	4	AFC Bournemouth	Summer 1983	
Geoff Scott	CB	(England)	Birmingham	31 October 1956 (aged 28)	22	0	Middlesbrough	September 1984	
Paul Shirtliff	FB	(England)	Hoyland	3 November 1962 (aged 22)	29	0	Sheffield Wednesday	Summer 1984	
Midfielders
Paul Bancroft	CM	(England)	Derby	10 September 1964 (aged 20)	17	0	Derby County	July 1984	Free
Neil Brough	W	(England)	Daventry	22 December 1965 (aged 19)	13	0	Apprentice	December 1983	N/A
Steve Brown	CM	(England)	Northampton	6 July 1966 (aged 18)	15	3	Apprentice	May 1983	N/A
Phil Cavener	W	(England)	Tynemouth	2 June 1961 (aged 23)	32	7	FK Karlskrona	August 1984	
Warren Donald	CM	(England)	Hillingdon	7 October 1964 (aged 20)	11	2	West Ham United	March 1985	Loan
Austin Hayes	W	(Republic of Ireland)	Hammersmith (ENG)	15 July 1958 (aged 26)	78	14	Millwall	August 1983	
Aidy Mann	W	(England)	Northampton	12 July 1967 (aged 17)	45	3	Apprentice	May 1984	N/A
Keith Thompson	W	(England)	Birmingham	24 April 1965 (aged 20)	10	1	Coventry City	March 1985	Loan
Ray Train (c)	DM	(England)	Bedworth	10 February 1951 (aged 34)	54	3	Oxford United	March 1984	
Forwards
Frankie Belfon	FW	(England)	Wellingborough	18 February 1965 (aged 20)	93	17	Apprentice	April 1982	N/A
Ian Benjamin	FW	(England)	Nottingham	11 December 1961 (aged 23)	52	19	Peterborough United	Summer 1984	

== Competitions ==
=== Canon League Division Four ===
==== League table ====
Pos	Team	Pld	W	D	L	GF	GA	GD	Pts	Promotion
20	Southend United	46	13	11	22	58	83	−25	50	
21	Halifax Town	46	15	5	26	42	69	−27	50	Re-elected
22	Stockport County	46	13	8	25	58	79	−21	47	Re-elected
23	Northampton Town	46	14	5	27	53	74	−21	47	Re-elected
24	Torquay United	46	9	14	23	38	63	−25	41	Re-elected

==== Results summary ====
Overall								Home						Away					
Pld	W	D	L	GF	GA	GD	Pts	W	D	L	GF	GA	GD	W	D	L	GF	GA	GD
46	14	5	27	53	74	−21	47	10	1	12	32	32	0	4	4	15	21	42	−21

Last updated: 30 January 2024.

==== League position by match ====
Round	1	2	3	4	5	6	7	8	9	10	11	12	13	14	15	16	17	18	19	20	21	22	23	24	25	26	27	28	29	30	31	32	33	34	35	36	37	38	39	40	41	42	43	44	45	46
Ground	A	H	A	H	H	A	H	A	H	A	A	H	A	H	A	H	A	H	A	A	H	H	A	H	A	A	A	A	A	H	H	A	H	H	A	H	A	H	A	H	H	H	H	A	H	A
Result	L	L	L	L	D	L	L	W	L	L	W	W	L	L	L	W	W	L	D	L	L	W	L	W	L	L	L	L	L	L	L	D	L	L	L	L	D	W	L	W	W	W	W	D	W	W
Position	24	24	24	24	24	24	24	24	24	24	22	21	21	22	22	21	18	21	19	21	23	19	20	18	18	20	23	23	23	24	24	24	24	24	24	24	24	24	24	24	24	24	24	22	22	23

Source: Rothmans Football Yearbook 1985-86
A = Away; H = Home; W = Win; D = Draw; L = Loss

==== Matches ====
Win Draw Loss

25 August 1984 1	Exeter City	5–0	Northampton Town	Exeter
15:00 BST	o.g.' R.McDonough; R.Pratt; J.Sims			Stadium: St James Park; Attendance: 3,166; Referee: Les Burden

1 September 1984 2	Northampton Town	1–3	Chesterfield	Northampton
15:00 BST	A.Hayes pen.'			Stadium: County Ground; Attendance: 2,554

8 September 1984 3	Darlington	4–0	Northampton Town	Darlington
15:00 BST	C.Airey 5' 64'; J.Hannah 14'; D.McLean 55' (pen.)	Report		Stadium: Feethams; Attendance: 1,110

15 September 1984 4	Northampton Town	0–1	Halifax Town	Northampton
15:00 BST				Stadium: County Ground; Attendance: 1,437

18 September 1984 5	Northampton Town	0–0	Rochdale	Northampton
19:30 BST				Stadium: County Ground; Attendance: 1,653; Referee: Danny Vickers

22 September 1984 6	Chester City	1–0	Northampton Town	Chester
15:00 BST	O.Brown			Stadium: Sealand Road; Attendance: 1,845

29 September 1984 7	Northampton Town	1–3	Colchester United	Northampton
15:00 BST	A.Hayes 24'; B.Mundee (red card) 64'	Report	N.Parkinson 70'; T.Adcock 74'; K.Bowen 78'	Stadium: County Ground; Attendance: 1,595; Referee: John Martin

1 October 1984 8	Port Vale	0–3	Northampton Town	Burslem
15:00 BST			F.Belfon; P.Cavener; A.Hayes	Stadium: Vale Park; Attendance: 3,235; Referee: Allan Banks

6 October 1984 9	Northampton Town	0–2	Scunthorpe United	Northampton
15:00 BST				Stadium: County Ground; Attendance: 1,813

13 October 1984 10	Southend United	2–1	Northampton Town	Southend-on-Sea
15:00 BST			F.Belfon	Stadium: Roots Hall; Attendance: 2,265

16 October 1984 11	Wrexham	0–3	Northampton Town	Wrexham, Wales
19:30 BST			I.Benjamin; W.Gage	Stadium: Racecourse Ground; Attendance: 1,748

20 October 1984 12	Northampton Town	4–0	Aldershot	Northampton
15:00 BST	I.Benjamin; W.Gage			Stadium: County Ground; Attendance: 1,864; Referee: John Hough

27 October 1984 13	Blackpool	2–1	Northampton Town	Blackpool
15:00 BST			A.Mann	Stadium: Bloomfield Road; Attendance: 3,577

3 November 1984 14	Northampton Town	0–1	Bury	Northampton
15:00 GMT				Stadium: County Ground; Attendance: 2,240

6 November 1984 15	Crewe Alexandra	3–2	Northampton Town	Crewe
19:30 GMT			F.Belfon; I.Benjamin	Stadium: Gresty Road; Attendance: 2,154

10 November 1984 16	Northampton Town	4–0	Swindon Town	Northampton
15:00 GMT	I.Benjamin; W.Gage; A.Hayes pen.'			Stadium: County Ground; Attendance: 2,274

23 November 1984 17	Tranmere Rovers	1–2	Northampton Town	Birkenhead
19:30 GMT			F.Belfon; I.Benjamin	Stadium: Prenton Park; Attendance: 1,899

1 December 1984 18	Northampton Town	0–3	Hereford United	Northampton
15:00 GMT				Stadium: County Ground; Attendance: 2,523

15 December 1984 19	Hartlepool United	0–0	Northampton Town	Hartlepool
15:00 GMT				Stadium: Victoria Park; Attendance: 2,207

22 December 1984 20	Mansfield Town	2–0	Northampton Town	Mansfield
15:00 GMT	D.Caldwell			Stadium: Field Mill; Attendance: 2,207

26 December 1984 21	Northampton Town	0–3	Peterborough United	Northampton
15:00 GMT				Stadium: County Ground; Attendance: 4,350

29 December 1984 22	Northampton Town	3–1	Torquay United	Northampton
15:00 GMT	P.Cavener pen.'			Stadium: County Ground; Attendance: 1,496

1 January 1985 23	Stockport County	4–2	Northampton Town	Stockport
15:00 GMT			I.Benjamin; R.Lewis	Stadium: Edgeley Park; Attendance: 1,726

5 January 1985 24	Northampton Town	5–2	Exeter City	Northampton
15:00 GMT	I.Benjamin; P.Cavener pen.'		J.McNichol; T.Morgan	Stadium: County Ground; Attendance: 1,475

12 January 1985 25	Chesterfield	2–1	Northampton Town	Chesterfield
15:00 GMT			P.Cavener pen.'	Stadium: Saltergate; Attendance: 3,759

1 February 1985 26	Colchester United	4–1	Northampton Town	Colchester
19:30 GMT	R.Hedman 63'; T.Adcock 70'; K.Day 72'; N.Parkinson 83' (pen.)	Report	B.Mundee 85'	Stadium: Layer Road; Attendance: 2,314; Referee: Tony Ward

16 February 1985 27	Rochdale	3–0	Northampton Town	Rochdale
15:00 GMT	D.Thompson 40'; B.Diamond 56', 86'			Stadium: Spotland; Attendance: 1,228; Referee: Neville Ashley

23 February 1985 28	Bury	3–1	Northampton Town	Bury
15:15 GMT			M.Barnes	Stadium: Spotland; Attendance: 2,938

26 February 1985 29	Halifax Town	1–0	Northampton Town	Halifax
19:30 GMT				Stadium: The Shay; Attendance: 1,009
Note: Fixture was previously postponed on January 25, 1985.

2 March 1985 30	Northampton Town	0–1	Blackpool	Northampton
15:00 GMT				Stadium: County Ground; Attendance: 1,860

5 March 1985 31	Northampton Town	0–4	Wrexham	Northampton
19:30 GMT				Stadium: County Ground; Attendance: 1,223; Referee: Darryl Reeves

9 March 1985 32	Aldershot	0–0	Northampton Town	Aldershot
15:00 GMT				Stadium: Recreation Ground; Attendance: 1,955

17 March 1985 33	Northampton Town	1–2	Southend United	Northampton
15:00 GMT	F.Belfon			Stadium: County Ground; Attendance: 1,702

19 March 1985 34	Northampton Town	0–2	Chester City	Northampton
19:30 GMT			S.Rimmer; R.Greenough	Stadium: County Ground; Attendance: 942; Referee: Allan Gunn
Note: Fixture was previously postponed on February 9, 1985.

22 March 1985 35	Scunthorpe United	2–1	Northampton Town	Scunthorpe
19:30 GMT			I.Benjamin	Stadium: Old Show Ground; Attendance: 2,024

30 March 1985 36	Northampton Town	1–3	Crewe Alexandra	Northampton
15:00 GMT	I.Benjamin			Stadium: County Ground; Attendance: 1,264

2 April 1985 37	Peterborough United	0–0	Northampton Town	Peterborough
19:30 BST				Stadium: London Road; Attendance: 2,482

9 April 1985 38	Northampton Town	4–0	Stockport County	Northampton
19:30 BST	I.Benjamin; S.Brown; W.Donald; A.Mann			Stadium: County Ground; Attendance: 1,426; Referee: Danny Vickers

13 April 1985 39	Swindon Town	2–0	Northampton Town	Swindon
15:00 BST				Stadium: County Ground; Attendance: 3,642

15 April 1985 40	Northampton Town	2–0	Hartlepool United	Northampton
15:00 BST	W.Donald; B.Mundee			Stadium: County Ground; Attendance: 1,181

17 April 1985 41	Northampton Town	1–0	Port Vale	Northampton
19:30 BST	W.Gage			Stadium: County Ground; Attendance: 1,311

20 April 1985 42	Northampton Town	2–0	Tranmere Rovers	Northampton
15:00 BST	I.Benjamin; S.Brown			Stadium: County Ground; Attendance: 1,581

23 April 1985 43	Northampton Town	2–1	Darlington	Northampton
19:30 BST	I.Benjamin; K.Thompson			Stadium: County Ground; Attendance: 1,838

27 April 1985 44	Hereford United	1–1	Northampton Town	Hereford
15:00 BST			S.Brown	Stadium: Edgar Street; Attendance: 3,266

30 April 1985 45	Northampton Town	1–0	Mansfield Town	Northampton
19:30 BST	R.Train			Stadium: County Ground; Attendance: 2,350

6 May 1985 46	Torquay United	0–2	Northampton Town	Torquay
15:00 BST			I.Benjamin; R.Lewis	Stadium: Plainmoor; Attendance: 1,181

=== FA Cup ===
17 November 1984 First round	Northampton Town	2–2	VS Rugby	Northampton
15:00 GMT	R.Train; T.Lee			Stadium: County Ground; Attendance: 4,815

21 November 1984 First round (r)	VS Rugby	0–1	Northampton Town	Rugby
19:30 GMT			W.Gage	Stadium: Butlin Road; Attendance: 3,961

8 December 1984 Second round	Brentford	2–2	Northampton Town	Brentford, London
15:00 GMT			R.Train; T.Lee	Stadium: Griffin Park; Attendance: 4,449

17 December 1984 Second round (r)	Northampton Town	0–2	Brentford	Northampton
19:30 GMT				Stadium: County Ground; Attendance: 3,610
Note: Fixture was previously abandoned on December 11, 1984 due to snow.

=== Milk Cup ===
27 August 1984 First round 1st leg	Crystal Palace	1–0	Northampton Town	Selhurst, London
15:00 BST				Stadium: Selhurst Park; Attendance: 3,752; Referee: Ian Borrett

4 September 1984 First round 2nd leg	Northampton Town	0–0	Crystal Palace	Northampton
19:30 BST				Stadium: County Ground; Attendance: 2,979

=== Freight Rover Trophy ===
29 January 1985 First round 1st leg	Port Vale	1–1	Northampton Town	Burslem
19:30 GMT	O.Williams		I.Benjamin	Stadium: Vale Park; Attendance: 1,386

5 February 1985 First round 2nd leg	Northampton Town	1–2 (a.e.t.)	Port Vale	Northampton
19:30 GMT	F.Belfon		R.Earle	Stadium: County Ground; Attendance: 1,407

=== Appearances and goals ===
Pos	Player	Division Four			FA Cup			League Cup			League Trophy			Total		
Pos	Player	Starts	Sub	Goals	Starts	Sub	Goals	Starts	Sub	Goals	Starts	Sub	Goals	Starts	Sub	Goals
GK	Peter Gleasure	43	–	–	4	–	–	2	–	–	2	–	–	51	–	–
DF	Michael Barnes	19	–	1	4	–	–	2	–	–	–	–	–	25	–	1
DF	Mark Bushell	1	–	–	–	–	–	–	–	–	–	–	–	1	–	–
DF	Wakeley Gage	42	1	4	2	1	1	2	–	–	2	–	–	48	3	5
DF	Russell Lewis	43	1	2	4	–	–	1	–	–	2	–	–	50	1	2
DF	Brian Mundee	32	1	2	3	–	–	2	–	–	2	–	–	39	1	2
DF	Geoff Scott	16	1	–	2	1	–	–	–	–	2	–	–	20	2	–
DF	Paul Shirtliff	27	2	–	–	–	–	1	–	–	–	–	–	28	2	–
MF	Paul Bancroft	15	1	–	–	–	–	1	–	–	–	–	–	16	1	–
MF	Neil Brough	3	4	–	–	–	–	–	–	–	1	–	–	4	4	–
MF	Steve Brown	14	–	3	–	–	–	–	–	–	–	–	–	14	–	3
MF	Phil Cavener	28	–	7	1	–	–	2	–	–	1	–	–	32	–	7
MF	Warren Donald	11	–	2	–	–	–	–	–	–	–	–	–	11	–	2
MF	Austin Hayes	20	–	5	4	–	–	2	–	–	–	1	–	26	1	5
MF	Aidy Mann	36	2	2	4	–	–	–	–	–	1	–	–	41	2	2
MF	Keith Thompson	10	–	1	–	–	–	–	–	–	–	–	–	10	–	1
MF	Ray Train	46	–	1	4	–	2	2	–	–	2	–	–	54	–	3
FW	Frankie Belfon	26	5	5	4	–	–	1	–	–	2	–	1	33	5	6
FW	Ian Benjamin	42	2	18	4	–	–	2	–	–	2	–	1	50	2	19
Players who left before end of season:
GK	Kevin Poole	3	–	–	–	–	–	–	–	–	–	–	–	3	–	–
MF	Mark Hutchinson	1	1	–	–	–	–	–	–	–	1	–	–	2	1	–
FW	Trevor Lee	24	–	–	4	–	2	2	–	–	2	–	–	32	–	2
FW	Mick Perry	4	–	–	–	–	–	–	–	–	–	–	–	4	–	–
