= 1985–86 Northampton Town F.C. season =

Northampton Town F.C.
1985–86 season
- Chairman: Derek Banks
- Manager: Graham Carr
- Stadium: County Ground
- Division Four: 8th
- FA Cup: First round
- Milk Cup: Second round
- Freight Rover Trophy: Quarter-final (s)
- Top goalscorer: League: Ian Benjamin (22); All: Ian Benjamin (26)
- Highest home attendance: 4,449 vs Swindon Town
- Lowest home attendance: 1,167 vs Torquay United
- Average home league attendance: 2,384

The 1985–86 season was Northampton Town's 89th season in their history and the ninth successive season in the Fourth Division. Alongside competing in Division Four, the club also participated in the FA Cup, League Cup and Associate Members' Cup.

== Players ==
As of match played 3 May 1986.

| Name | Position | Nat. | Place of Birth | Date of Birth (Age) | Apps | Goals | Previous club | Date signed | Fee |
Goalkeepers
| Peter Gleasure | GK | (England) | Luton | 8 October 1960 (aged 25) | 168 | 0 | Millwall | March 1983 | |
| Tim Garner | GK | (England) | Hitchin | 30 March 1961 (aged 25) | 2 | 0 | Kidderminster Harriers | Summer 1985 | |
Defenders
| Mark Bushell | FB | (England) | Northampton | 5 June 1968 (aged 17) | 1 | 0 | Apprentice | Summer 1985 | N/A |
| Paul Curtis | RB | (England) | London | 1 July 1963 (aged 22) | 32 | 1 | Charlton Athletic | Summer 1985 | Free |
| Paul Friar | LB | (Scotland) | Glasgow | 6 June 1963 (aged 22) | 16 | 0 | Charlton Athletic | 6 March 1986 | Loan |
| Russell Lewis | CB | (Wales) | Blaengwynfi | 15 September 1956 (aged 29) | 155 | 6 | Swindon Town | Summer 1983 | |
| Keith McPherson | CB | (England) | Greenwich | 11 September 1963 (aged 22) | 21 | 0 | West Ham United | 23 January 1986 | £10,000 |
| Graham Reed | RB | (England) | Doncaster | 24 June 1961 (aged 24) | 43 | 1 | Frickley Athletic | Summer 1985 | £6,000 |
Midfielders
| Phil Chard | U | (England) | Corby | 16 October 1960 (aged 25) | 49 | 8 | Peterborough United | 19 August 1985 | |
| Warren Donald | CM | (England) | Hillingdon | 7 October 1964 (aged 21) | 48 | 5 | West Ham United | 4 October 1985 | £11,000 |
| Stewart Hamill | W | (Scotland) | Glasgow | 22 January 1960 (aged 26) | 4 | 2 | Nuneaton Town | April 1986 | |
| Richard Hill | CM | (England) | Hinckley | 20 September 1963 (aged 22) | 49 | 19 | Nuneaton Town | Summer 1985 | £10,000 |
| Aidy Mann | W | (England) | Northampton | 12 July 1967 (aged 18) | 82 | 5 | Apprentice | May 1984 | N/A |
| Mark Schiavi | W | (England) | London | 1 May 1964 (aged 22) | 39 | 6 | Bournemouth | Summer 1985 | Free |
Forwards
| Ian Benjamin | FW | (England) | Nottingham | 11 December 1961 (aged 24) | 106 | 45 | Peterborough United | Summer 1984 | |
| Trevor Morley (c) | FW | (England) | Nottingham | 20 March 1962 (aged 24) | 51 | 13 | Nuneaton Town | Summer 1985 | £20,000 |
| Paul Sugrue | FW | (England) | Coventry | 6 November 1960 (aged 25) | 9 | 2 | Portsmouth | March 1986 | |

== Competitions ==
=== Canon League Division Four ===
==== League table ====
| Pos | Team | Pld | W | D | L | GF | GA | GD | Pts |
|---|---|---|---|---|---|---|---|---|---|
| 6 | Colchester United | 46 | 19 | 13 | 14 | 88 | 63 | +25 | 70 |
| 7 | Hartlepool United | 46 | 20 | 10 | 16 | 68 | 67 | +1 | 70 |
| 8 | Northampton Town | 46 | 18 | 10 | 18 | 79 | 58 | +21 | 64 |
| 9 | Southend United | 46 | 18 | 10 | 18 | 69 | 67 | +2 | 64 |
| 10 | Hereford United | 46 | 18 | 10 | 18 | 74 | 73 | +1 | 64 |

==== Results summary ====
| Overall | | | | | | | | Home | | | | | | Away | | | | | |
| Pld | W | D | L | GF | GA | GD | Pts | W | D | L | GF | GA | GD | W | D | L | GF | GA | GD |
|---|---|---|---|---|---|---|---|---|---|---|---|---|---|---|---|---|---|---|---|
| 46 | 18 | 10 | 18 | 79 | 58 | +21 | 64 | 9 | 7 | 7 | 44 | 29 | +15 | 9 | 3 | 11 | 35 | 29 | +6 |

Last updated: 30 March 2020.

==== League position by match ====
| Round | 1 | 2 | 3 | 4 | 5 | 6 | 7 | 8 | 9 | 10 | 11 | 12 | 13 | 14 | 15 | 16 | 17 | 18 | 19 | 20 | 21 | 22 | 23 | 24 | 25 | 26 | 27 | 28 | 29 | 30 | 31 | 32 | 33 | 34 | 35 | 36 | 37 | 38 | 39 | 40 | 41 | 42 | 43 | 44 | 45 | 46 |
|---|---|---|---|---|---|---|---|---|---|---|---|---|---|---|---|---|---|---|---|---|---|---|---|---|---|---|---|---|---|---|---|---|---|---|---|---|---|---|---|---|---|---|---|---|---|---|
| Ground | A | A | H | A | H | H | A | H | A | H | H | A | A | H | A | H | H | A | H | A | A | H | A | A | H | A | H | A | A | H | A | A | H | H | A | H | A | H | A | H | H | H | A | H | H | A |
| Result | L | W | W | L | W | L | L | W | L | L | L | W | D | D | W | D | D | L | W | W | W | D | D | L | W | W | L | W | L | W | L | L | W | D | L | W | W | D | W | D | L | L | L | L | W | D |
| Position | 15 | 13 | 10 | 12 | 6 | 11 | 14 | 10 | 12 | 13 | 16 | 13 | 14 | 13 | 12 | 13 | 13 | 15 | 14 | 11 | 9 | 9 | 10 | 14 | 13 | 10 | 11 | 9 | 9 | 8 | 8 | 10 | 8 | 9 | 9 | 8 | 8 | 7 | 6 | 7 | 7 | 8 | 8 | 10 | 9 | 8 |

Source: Rothmans Football Yearbook 1986-87
A = Away; H = Home; W = Win; D = Draw; L = Loss

==== Matches ====
Win Draw Loss

| 17 August 1985 1 | Burnley | 3–2 | Northampton Town | Burnley |
| 15:00 BST | K.Hird; W.Biggins; B.Mundee (o.g.) | | T.Morley; G.Reed | Stadium: Turf Moor; Attendance: 4,214 |

| 26 August 1985 2 | Exeter City | 1–2 | Northampton Town | Exeter |
| 15:00 BST | T.Kellow | | T.Morley; I.Benjamin | Stadium: St James Park; Attendance: 2,392; Referee: Rodger Gifford |

| 31 August 1985 3 | Northampton Town | 1–0 | Mansfield Town | Northampton |
| 15:00 BST | P.Cavener (pen.) | | | Stadium: County Ground; Attendance: 2,739 |

| 6 September 1985 4 | Swindon Town | 3–2 | Northampton Town | Swindon |
| 15:00 BST | P.Coyne (pen.) (pen.) | | R.Hill; P.Cavener (pen.) | Stadium: County Ground; Attendance: 4,102 |

| 10 September 1985 5 | Northampton Town | 6–0 | Preston North End | Northampton |
| 19:30 BST | I.Benjamin; R.Hill; T.Morley | | | Stadium: County Ground; Attendance: 2,171 |

| 14 September 1985 6 | Northampton Town | 0–1 | Crewe Alexandra | Northampton |
| 15:00 BST | | | G.Blissett | Stadium: County Ground; Attendance: 2,654 |

| 18 September 1985 7 | Hartlepool United | 2–1 | Northampton Town | Hartlepool |
| 19:30 BST | B.Honour; N.Walker | | R.Hill | Stadium: Victoria Park; Attendance: 2,200 |

| 21 September 1985 8 | Northampton Town | 3–1 | Stockport County | Northampton |
| 15:00 BST | I.Benjamin; R.Hill; T.Morley | | T.Sword | Stadium: County Ground; Attendance: 1,954 |

| 28 September 1985 9 | Rochdale | 3–2 | Northampton Town | Rochdale |
| 15:00 BST | P.Heaton; R.Moore; D.Grant | | R.Hill; I.Benjamin | Stadium: Spotland Stadium; Attendance: 1,954; Referee: George Courtney |

| 1 October 1985 10 | Northampton Town | 1–2 | Wrexham | Northampton |
| 19:30 BST | R.Hill | | J.Steel; S.Charles | Stadium: County Ground; Attendance: 2,234 |

| 5 October 1985 11 | Northampton Town | 1–3 | Hereford United | Northampton |
| 15:00 BST | P.Chard | | I.Wells; O.Kearns; M.Carter | Stadium: County Ground; Attendance: 1,998 |

| 12 October 1985 12 | Peterborough United | 0–5 | Northampton Town | Peterborough |
| 15:00 BST | | | P.Chard; A.Mann; P.Cavener; I.Benjamin | Stadium: London Road; Attendance: 3,901 |

| 19 October 1985 13 | Torquay United | 1–1 | Northampton Town | Torquay |
| 15:00 BST | D.Dawkins | | P.Chard | Stadium: Plainmoor; Attendance: 1,186 |

| 22 October 1985 14 | Northampton Town | 2–2 | Chester City | Northampton |
| 19:30 BST | T.Morley; I.Benjamin | | M.Graham; D.Murray | Stadium: County Ground; Attendance: 2,323 |

| 26 October 1985 15 | Colchester United | 0–2 | Northampton Town | Colchester |
| 15:00 BST | | Report | P.Chard 2'; A.Mann 23' | Stadium: Layer Road; Attendance: 2,872; Referee: M James |

| 2 November 1985 16 | Northampton Town | 2–2 | Scunthorpe United | Northampton |
| 15:00 GMT | I.Benjamin; P.Cavener (pen.) | | M.Brolly; S.Lister | Stadium: County Ground; Attendance: 2,343 |

| 5 November 1985 17 | Northampton Town | 2–2 | Tranmere Rovers | Northampton |
| 19:30 GMT | W.Donald; I.Benjamin | | F.Worthington (pen.); B.Rodaway | Stadium: County Ground; Attendance: 2,005; Referee: Danny Vickers |

| 9 November 1985 18 | Aldershot | 1–0 | Northampton Town | Aldershot |
| 15:00 GMT | A.Massey (pen.) | | | Stadium: Recreation Ground; Attendance: 1,556 |

| 23 November 1985 19 | Northampton Town | 4–0 | Halifax Town | Northampton |
| 15:00 GMT | P.Chard (pen.); I.Benjamin; T.Morley; M.Schiavi | | | Stadium: County Ground; Attendance: 1,514 |

| 30 November 1985 20 | Cambridge United | 2–5 | Northampton Town | Cambridge |
| 15:00 GMT | D.Crown; S.Fallon | | I.Benjamin (pen.); M.Schiavi; T.Morley | Stadium: Abbey Stadium; Attendance: 2,235 |

| 6 December 1985 21 | Southend United | 0–4 | Northampton Town | Southend-on-Sea |
| 19:30 GMT | | | M.Schiavi; P.Curtis; I.Benjamin | Stadium: Roots Hall; Attendance: 2,527 |

| 14 December 1985 22 | Northampton Town | 2–2 | Port Vale | Northampton |
| 15:00 GMT | T.Morley; P.Chard | | | Stadium: County Ground; Attendance: 3,259 |

| 21 December 1985 23 | Preston North End | 1–1 | Northampton Town | Preston |
| 15:00 GMT | P.Sproson; R.Earle | | R.Hill | Stadium: Deepdale; Attendance: 2,570 |

| 11 January 1986 24 | Mansfield Town | 1–0 | Northampton Town | Mansfield |
| 15:00 GMT | M.Kearney (pen.) | | R.Hill (red card) | Stadium: Field Mill; Attendance: 3,836 |

| 18 January 1986 25 | Northampton Town | 2–0 | Burnley | Northampton |
| 15:00 GMT | T.Morley; R.Hill | | | Stadium: County Ground; Attendance: 3,095 |

| 25 January 1986 26 | Crewe Alexandra | 0–1 | Northampton Town | Crewe |
| 15:00 GMT | | | T.Morley | Stadium: Gresty Road; Attendance: 1,856 |

| 1 February 1986 27 | Northampton Town | 0–1 | Swindon Town | Northampton |
| 15:00 GMT | | | C.Henry | Stadium: County Ground; Attendance: 4,449 |

| 5 February 1986 28 | Chester City | 2–3 | Northampton Town | Chester |
| 19:30 GMT | I.Richardson (pen.); P.Chard (o.g.) | | R.Hill; M.Schiavi; T.Morley | Stadium: Sealand Road; Attendance: 3,332 |

| 21 February 1986 29 | Stockport County | 1–0 | Northampton Town | Stockport |
| 19:30 GMT | S.Cammack | | | Stadium: Edgeley Park; Attendance: 2,011 |

| 1 March 1986 30 | Northampton Town | 1–0 | Rochdale | Northampton |
| 15:00 GMT | I.Benjamin | | | Stadium: County Ground; Attendance: 2,146 |

| 4 March 1986 31 | Wrexham | 1–0 | Northampton Town | Wrexham, Wales |
| 19:30 GMT | J.Steel | | | Stadium: Racecourse Ground; Attendance: 1,433 |

| 8 March 1986 32 | Hereford United | 3–0 | Northampton Town | Hereford |
| 15:00 GMT | P.Maddy; M.Carter | | | Stadium: Edgar Street; Attendance: 2,478 |

| 11 March 1986 33 | Northampton Town | 3–0 | Hartlepool United | Northampton |
| 19:30 GMT | I.Benjamin; R.Hill | | | Stadium: County Ground; Attendance: 1,815 |

| 15 March 1986 34 | Northampton Town | 2–2 | Peterborough United | Northampton |
| 15:00 GMT | T.Morley; R.Hill | | T.Slack; E.Kelly | Stadium: County Ground; Attendance: 3,332 |

| 18 March 1986 35 | Scunthorpe United | 1–0 | Northampton Town | Scunthorpe |
| 19:30 GMT | J.Broddle | | P.Chard (red card) | Stadium: Old Showground; Attendance: 1,355 |

| 22 March 1986 36 | Northampton Town | 1–0 | Colchester United | Northampton |
| 15:00 GMT | W.Donald 13' | Report | | Stadium: County Ground; Attendance: 2,035; Referee: P Tyldesley |

| 29 March 1986 37 | Orient | 0–1 | Northampton Town | Leyton, London |
| 15:00 GMT | | | I.Benjamin | Stadium: Brisbane Road; Attendance: 2,920 |

| 31 March 1986 38 | Northampton Town | 0–0 | Southend United | Northampton |
| 15:00 BST | | | | Stadium: County Ground; Attendance: 3,527 |

| 4 April 1986 39 | Tranmere Rovers | 1–3 | Northampton Town | Birkenhead |
| 15:00 BST | M.Hilditch | | S.Hamill; I.Benjamin; P.Sugrue | Stadium: Prenton Park; Attendance: 1,103 |

| 8 April 1986 40 | Northampton Town | 2–2 | Exeter City | Northampton |
| 19:30 BST | W.Donald; R.Hill | | M.Ling; P.Friar (o.g.) | Stadium: County Ground; Attendance: 2,213 |

| 12 April 1986 41 | Northampton Town | 2–3 | Aldershot | Northampton |
| 15:00 BST | P.Sugrue; P.Chard | | G.Johnson; B.Barnes | Stadium: County Ground; Attendance: 2,049 |

| 15 April 1986 42 | Northampton Town | 2–3 | Orient | Northampton |
| 19:30 BST | T.Morley; R.Hill | | C.Jones; A.Comfort; C.Foster | Stadium: County Ground; Attendance: 1,731 |

| 18 April 1986 43 | Halifax Town | 2–0 | Northampton Town | Halifax |
| 15:00 BST | D.Longhurst | | | Stadium: The Shay; Attendance: 1,105 |

| 26 April 1986 44 | Northampton Town | 0–2 | Cambridge United | Northampton |
| 15:00 BST | | | D.Crown; B.Mundee | Stadium: County Ground; Attendance: 2,100 |

| 29 April 1986 45 | Northampton Town | 5–1 | Torquay United | Northampton |
| 19:30 BST | R.Hill (pen.); M.Schiavi; P.Compton (o.g.) | | M.Walsh | Stadium: County Ground; Attendance: 1,167 |

| 3 May 1986 46 | Port Vale | 0–0 | Northampton Town | Burslem |
| 15:00 BST | | | | Stadium: Vale Park; Attendance: 3,873 |

=== FA Cup ===
| 16 November 1985 First round | Gillingham | 3–0 | Northampton Town | Gillingham |
| 15:00 GMT | B.Mundee (o.g.); D.Mehmet; T.Cochrane | | | Stadium: Priestfield Stadium; Attendance: 3,991; Referee: Dennis Hedges |

=== Milk Cup ===
| 21 August 1985 First round 1st leg | Peterborough United | 0–0 | Northampton Town | Peterborough |
| 19:30 BST | | | | Stadium: London Road; Attendance: 3,117; Referee: John Moules |

| 2 September 1985 First round 2nd leg | Northampton Town | 2–0 | Peterborough United | Northampton |
| 19:30 BST | P.Cavener (pen.); P.Chard | | | Stadium: County Ground; Attendance: 2,464 |

| 25 September 1985 Second round 1st leg | Oxford United | 2–1 | Northampton Town | Oxford |
| 19:30 BST | P.Rhoades-Brown; R.Houghton | | I.Benjamin | Stadium: Manor Ground; Attendance: 5,644 |

| 7 October 1985 Second round 2nd leg | Northampton Town | 0–2 | Oxford United | Northampton |
| 19:30 BST | | | J.Aldridge | Stadium: County Ground; Attendance: 5,076 |

=== Freight Rover Trophy ===
Group 2
| Team | Pld | W | D | L | GF | GA | GD | Pts |
|---|---|---|---|---|---|---|---|---|
| Northampton Town | 2 | 2 | 0 | 0 | 5 | 2 | +3 | 6 |
| Colchester United | 2 | 1 | 0 | 1 | 5 | 3 | +2 | 3 |
| Southend United | 2 | 0 | 0 | 2 | 2 | 7 | −5 | 0 |

| 21 January 1986 Prelim round (s) | Northampton Town | 2–1 | Colchester United | Northampton |
| 19:30 GMT | M.Schiavi 4'; I.Benjamin 82' | Report | T.Baker 36' | Stadium: County Ground; Attendance: 1,958; Referee: Gerald Ashby |

| 13 March 1986 Prelim round (s) | Southend United | 1–3 | Northampton Town | Southend-on-Sea |
| 19:30 GMT | F.Lampard Sr. | | R.Hill; I.Benjamin | Stadium: Roots Hall; Attendance: 683 |

| 27 March 1986 Quarter-final (s) | Bristol City | 3–2 | Northampton Town | Bristol |
| 19:30 GMT | G.Riley; B.Hutchinson; S.Neville | | S.Hamlil; R.Hill | Stadium: Ashton Gate; Attendance: 3,038 |

=== Appearances and goals ===
| Pos | Player | Division Four | | | FA Cup | | | League Cup | | | League Trophy | | | Total | | |
| Pos | Player | Starts | Sub | Goals | Starts | Sub | Goals | Starts | Sub | Goals | Starts | Sub | Goals | Starts | Sub | Goals |
|---|---|---|---|---|---|---|---|---|---|---|---|---|---|---|---|---|
| GK | Peter Gleasure | 44 | – | – | 1 | – | – | 4 | – | – | 3 | – | – | 52 | – | – |
| GK | Tim Garner | 2 | – | – | – | – | – | – | – | – | – | – | – | 2 | – | – |
| DF | Mark Bushell | – | – | – | – | – | – | – | – | – | – | – | – | – | – | – |
| DF | Paul Curtis | 27 | – | 1 | 1 | – | – | 4 | – | – | – | – | – | 32 | – | 1 |
| DF | Paul Friar | 14 | – | – | – | – | – | – | – | – | 2 | – | – | 16 | – | – |
| DF | Russell Lewis | 43 | – | – | 1 | – | – | 4 | – | – | 3 | – | – | 51 | – | – |
| DF | Keith McPherson | 20 | – | – | – | – | – | – | – | – | 1 | – | – | 21 | – | – |
| DF | Graham Reed | 34 | 2 | 1 | 1 | – | – | 3 | – | – | 2 | 1 | – | 40 | 3 | 1 |
| MF | Phil Chard | 41 | – | 7 | 1 | – | – | 4 | – | 1 | 3 | – | – | 49 | – | 8 |
| MF | Warren Donald | 32 | – | 3 | 1 | – | – | 1 | – | – | 3 | – | – | 37 | – | 3 |
| MF | Stewart Hamill | 3 | – | 1 | – | – | – | – | – | – | 1 | – | 1 | 4 | – | 2 |
| MF | Richard Hill | 41 | – | 17 | 1 | – | – | 4 | – | – | 3 | – | 2 | 49 | – | 19 |
| MF | Aidy Mann | 25 | 7 | 2 | – | – | – | 3 | – | – | 1 | 1 | – | 29 | 8 | 2 |
| MF | Mark Schiavi | 31 | – | 5 | – | – | – | 1 | 1 | – | 3 | – | 1 | 35 | 1 | 6 |
| FW | Ian Benjamin | 46 | – | 22 | 1 | – | – | 4 | – | 1 | 3 | – | 3 | 54 | – | 26 |
| FW | Trevor Morley | 43 | – | 13 | 1 | – | – | 4 | – | – | 3 | – | – | 51 | – | 13 |
| FW | Paul Sugrue | 2 | 6 | 2 | – | – | – | – | – | – | – | 1 | – | 2 | 7 | 2 |
Players who left before end of season:
| DF | Ian Dawes | 3 | 2 | – | – | – | – | 1 | – | – | – | – | – | 4 | 2 | – |
| DF | Brian Mundee | 31 | – | – | 1 | – | – | 4 | – | – | 1 | – | – | 37 | – | – |
| DF | Gavin Nebbeling | 11 | – | – | – | – | – | – | – | – | 1 | – | – | 12 | – | – |
| MF | Steve Brown | – | – | – | – | – | – | – | – | – | – | – | – | – | – | – |
| MF | Phil Cavener | 13 | 4 | 4 | 1 | – | – | 4 | – | 1 | – | – | – | 18 | 4 | 5 |
| MF | Ged Nohilly | – | – | – | – | – | – | – | – | – | – | – | – | – | – | – |
