= 1983–84 Northampton Town F.C. season =

Northampton Town
1983–84 season
- Chairman: Neville Ronson
- Manager: Clive Walker
- Stadium: County Ground
- Division Four: 18th
- FA Cup: Second round
- League Cup: First round
- Associate Members' Cup: First round
- Top goalscorer: League: Terry Austin (10); All: Terry Austin (13)
- Highest home attendance: 6,464 vs Peterborough United
- Lowest home attendance: 1,109 vs Hartlepool United
- Average home league attendance: 2,343

The 1983–84 season was Northampton Town's 87th season in their history and the seventh successive season in the Fourth Division. Alongside competing in Division Four, the club also participated in the FA Cup, League Cup and Associate Members' Cup.

== Players ==
As of match played 12 May 1984.

Name	Position	Nat.	Place of Birth	Date of Birth (Age)	Apps	Goals	Previous club	Date signed	Fee
Goalkeepers
Peter Gleasure	GK	(England)	Luton	8 October 1960 (aged 23)	65	0	Millwall	March 1983	
Defenders
Adrian Burrows	CB	(England)	Sutton-in-Ashfield	16 January 1959 (aged 25)	106	5	Mansfield Town	August 1982	
Martyn Forster	FB	(England)	Kettering	1 February 1963 (aged 21)	49	0	Kettering Town	August 1983	
Wakeley Gage	CB	(England)	Northampton	5 May 1958 (aged 26)	202	17	Desborough Town	October 1979	£8,000
Russell Lewis	CB	(Wales)	Blaengwynfi	15 September 1956 (aged 27)	53	4	Swindon Town	Summer 1983	
Brian Mundee	LB	(England)	Hammersmith	12 January 1964 (aged 20)	41	2	AFC Bournemouth	Summer 1983	
Barry Tucker	FB	(Wales)	Swansea	28 August 1952 (aged 31)	302	8	Brentford	October 1982	
Midfielders
Neil Brough	W	(England)	Daventry	22 December 1965 (aged 18)	5	0	Apprentice	December 1983	N/A
Steve Brown	CM	(England)	Northampton	6 July 1966 (aged 17)	1	0	Apprentice	May 1984	N/A
Austin Hayes	W	(Republic of Ireland)	Hammersmith (ENG)	15 July 1958 (aged 25)	51	9	Millwall	August 1983	
Billy Jeffrey (c)	CM	(Scotland)	Helensburgh	10 February 1951 (aged 33)	62	7	Blackpool	March 1983	
Aidy Mann	W	(England)	Northampton	12 July 1967 (aged 16)	2	0	Apprentice	May 1984	N/A
Eui Martinez	W	(England)	Chelmsford	12 July 1967 (aged 16)	12	2	Newport County	February 1984	Loan
Maurice Muir	W	(England)	London	19 March 1963 (aged 21)	37	1	Apprentice	April 1980	N/A
Tommy O'Neill	CM	(Scotland)	Kirkintilloch	2 February 1958 (aged 26)	51	7	Cambridge United	June 1983	Free
Ray Train	DM	(England)	Bedworth	10 February 1951 (aged 33)	0	0	Oxford United	March 1984	Loan
Forwards
Terry Austin	FW	(England)	London	1 February 1954 (aged 30)	51	13	Doncaster Rovers	August 1983	
Frankie Belfon	FW	(England)	Wellingborough	18 February 1965 (aged 19)	55	11	Apprentice	April 1982	N/A
Dave Syrett	FW	(England)	Salisbury	20 January 1956 (aged 28)	52	17	Peterborough United	June 1982	

== Competitions ==
=== Canon League Division Four ===
==== League table ====
Pos	Team	Pld	W	D	L	GF	GA	GD	Pts	Promotion or qualification
16	Crewe Alexandra	46	16	11	19	56	67	−11	59	
17	Swindon Town	46	15	13	18	58	56	+2	58	
18	Northampton Town	46	13	14	19	53	78	−25	53	
19	Mansfield Town	46	13	13	20	66	70	−4	52	
20	Wrexham	46	11	15	20	59	74	−15	48	Qualification for the European Cup Winners' Cup first round (Note: Wrexham lost the Welsh Cup final to Shrewsbury Town, but since Shrewsbury are an English side, Wrexham went on to represent Wales in the European Cup Winners' Cup.)

==== Results summary ====
Overall								Home						Away					
Pld	W	D	L	GF	GA	GD	Pts	W	D	L	GF	GA	GD	W	D	L	GF	GA	GD
46	13	14	19	53	78	−25	53	10	8	5	32	32	0	3	6	14	21	46	−25

Last updated: 8 February 2024.

==== League position by match ====
Round	1	2	3	4	5	6	7	8	9	10	11	12	13	14	15	16	17	18	19	20	21	22	23	24	25	26	27	28	29	30	31	32	33	34	35	36	37	38	39	40	41	42	43	44	45	46
Ground	A	H	H	A	H	A	A	H	H	A	H	A	H	A	H	A	A	H	H	A	H	A	H	H	A	A	H	H	A	H	A	A	A	H	A	H	H	A	H	H	A	H	A	H	A	A
Result	D	W	D	W	D	D	D	D	D	D	W	L	L	L	W	D	W	W	W	L	W	L	W	W	L	L	D	L	L	W	L	L	D	L	L	L	W	L	D	D	L	L	L	D	W	L
Position	14	6	4	2	7	8	8	9	10	12	7	11	14	16	14	13	11	10	9	10	9	10	8	6	6	10	11	12	14	10	10	14	14	15	15	16	15	15	16	15	16	17	17	18	18	18

Source: 11v11.com
A = Away; H = Home; W = Win; D = Draw; L = Loss

==== Matches ====
Win Draw Loss

27 August 1983 1	Chester City	1–1	Northampton Town	Chester
15:00 BST	M. Williams		F.Belfon	Stadium: Sealand Road; Attendance: 1,707

3 September 1983 2	Northampton Town	2–0	Darlington	Northampton
15:00 BST	T.O'Neill; T.Austin			Stadium: County Ground; Attendance: 2,009

6 September 1983 3	Northampton Town	0–0	Tranmere Rovers	Northampton
19:30 BST				Stadium: County Ground; Attendance: 2,326

10 September 1983 4	Blackpool	2–3	Northampton Town	Blackpool
15:00 BST			W.Gage; F.Belfon; T.Austin	Stadium: Bloomfield Road; Attendance: 3,216

18 September 1983 5	Northampton Town	0–0	Stockport County	Northampton
15:00 BST				Stadium: County Ground; Attendance: 3,189

24 September 1983 6	Rochdale	1–1	Northampton Town	Rochdale
15:00 BST	Johnson 82'; N.Hamilton (red card)		T.O'Neill	Stadium: Spotland; Attendance: 1,402; Referee: George Tyson

27 September 1983 7	Halifax Town	2–2	Northampton Town	Halifax
19:30 BST			B.Jeffrey; D.Syrett	Stadium: The Shay; Attendance: 1,519

1 October 1983 8	Northampton Town	1–1	Chesterfield	Northampton
15:00 BST	F.Belfon			Stadium: County Ground; Attendance: 2,733

9 October 1983 9	Northampton Town	1–1	Reading	Northampton
15:00 BST	W.Gage; T.Austin			Stadium: County Ground; Attendance: 3,825

15 October 1983 10	Colchester United	2–2	Northampton Town	Colchester
15:00 BST	S.Houston 16'; M.Cook 78'	Report	T.Austin 11'; T.O'Neill 81'	Stadium: Layer Road; Attendance: 1,964; Referee: David Letts

18 October 1983 11	Northampton Town	2–1	Torquay United	Northampton
19:30 BST	A.Hayes; B.Tucker			Stadium: County Ground; Attendance: 2,573

22 October 1983 12	Crewe Alexandra	3–2	Northampton Town	Crewe
15:00 BST			B.Jeffrey; W.Gage	Stadium: Gresty Road; Attendance: 2,107

29 October 1983 13	Northampton Town	1–2	York City	Northampton
15:00 GMT	F.Belfon		K.Walwyn	Stadium: County Ground; Attendance: 2,956

1 November 1983 14	Aldershot	1–0	Northampton Town	Aldershot
19:30 GMT				Stadium: Recreation Ground; Attendance: 1,711

5 November 1983 15	Northampton Town	2–0	Swindon Town	Northampton
15:00 GMT	T.Austin 29', 44'	Report		Stadium: County Ground; Attendance: 2,354; Referee: Trevor A Jones

12 November 1983 16	Hereford United	0–0	Northampton Town	Hereford
15:00 GMT				Stadium: Edgar Street; Attendance: 3,007

28 November 1983 17	Wrexham	0–1	Northampton Town	Wrexham, Wales
15:00 GMT			T.Austin	Stadium: Racecourse Ground; Attendance: 1,234

3 December 1983 18	Northampton Town	1–0	Bristol City	Northampton
15:00 GMT	F.Belfon			Stadium: County Ground; Attendance: 2,823

18 December 1983 19	Northampton Town	2–1	Mansfield Town	Northampton
15:00 GMT	T.Austin; R.Lewis		T.Lowery	Stadium: County Ground; Attendance: 2,628

26 December 1983 20	Doncaster Rovers	1–0	Northampton Town	Doncaster
15:00 GMT				Stadium: Belle Vue; Attendance: 3,827

27 December 1983 21	Northampton Town	2–1	Peterborough United	Northampton
15:00 GMT	B.Jeffrey; A.Hayes			Stadium: County Ground; Attendance: 6,464

31 December 1983 22	Hartlepool United	2–0	Northampton Town	Hartlepool
15:00 GMT				Stadium: Victoria Park; Attendance: 1,706

2 January 1984 23	Northampton Town	1–0	Bury	Northampton
19:30 GMT	T.O'Neill			Stadium: County Ground; Attendance: 2,525

14 January 1984 24	Northampton Town	2–1	Chester City	Northampton
15:00 GMT	R.Lewis; F.Belfon		T.Phillips	Stadium: County Ground; Attendance: 2,198

20 January 1984 25	Stockport County	1–0	Northampton Town	Stockport
19:30 GMT				Stadium: Edgeley Park; Attendance: 1,846

4 February 1984 26	Chesterfield	2–1	Northampton Town	Chesterfield
15:00 GMT			A.Hayes	Stadium: Saltergate; Attendance: 3,250

11 February 1984 27	Northampton Town	1–1	Rochdale	Northampton
15:00 GMT	A.Hayes 49'		S. Thompson 57'	Stadium: County Ground; Attendance: 2,022; Referee: Alan Crickmore

14 February 1984 28	Northampton Town	1–4	Aldershot	Northampton
19:30 GMT	F.Belfon			Stadium: County Ground; Attendance: 1,573

18 February 1984 29	York City	3–0	Northampton Town	York
15:00 GMT	K.Walwyn; B.Pollard (pen.); J.Byrne			Stadium: Bootham Crescent; Attendance: 3,941; Referee: Neil Midgley

25 February 1984 30	Northampton Town	2–0	Crewe Alexandra	Northampton
15:00 GMT	W.Gage; A.Hayes			Stadium: County Ground; Attendance: 1,696

28 February 1984 31	Darlington	5–3	Northampton Town	Darlington
19:30 GMT			A.Hayes; E.Martinez	Stadium: Feethams; Attendance: 1,278

3 March 1984 32	Torquay United	2–1	Northampton Town	Torquay
19:30 GMT			E.Martinez	Stadium: Plainmoor; Attendance: 2,042

6 March 1984 33	Swindon Town	0–0	Northampton Town	Swindon
19:30 GMT				Stadium: County Ground; Attendance: 2,798; Referee: Darryl Reeves

10 March 1984 34	Northampton Town	0–3	Hereford United	Northampton
15:00 GMT				Stadium: County Ground; Attendance: 1,592

17 March 1984 35	Reading	3–0	Northampton Town	Reading
15:00 GMT				Stadium: Elm Park; Attendance: 3,695

20 March 1984 36	Northampton Town	1–5	Blackpool	Northampton
19:30 GMT	T.O'Neill			Stadium: County Ground; Attendance: 1,337

24 March 1984 37	Northampton Town	3–1	Colchester United	Northampton
15:00 GMT	T.Austin 2'; W.Gage 59'; F.Belfon 64'	Report	I.Phillips 14'	Stadium: County Ground; Attendance: 1,499; Referee: Neville Ashley

30 March 1984 38	Tranmere Rovers	1–0	Northampton Town	Birkenhead
19:30 BST				Stadium: Prenton Park; Attendance: 1,829

7 April 1984 39	Northampton Town	1–1	Halifax Town	Northampton
15:00 BST	A.Hayes			Stadium: County Ground; Attendance: 1,356

10 April 1984 40	Northampton Town	1–1	Hartlepool United	Northampton
19:30 BST	A.Hayes			Stadium: County Ground; Attendance: 1,109

14 April 1984 41	Bristol City	4–1	Northampton Town	Bristol
15:00 BST			T.O'Neill (pen.)	Stadium: Ashton Gate; Attendance: 6,655

21 April 1984 42	Northampton Town	1–4	Doncaster Rovers	Northampton
15:00 BST	R.Lewis			Stadium: County Ground; Attendance: 1,912

24 April 1984 43	Peterborough United	6–0	Northampton Town	Peterborough
19:30 BST				Stadium: London Road; Attendance: 3,481

28 April 1984 44	Northampton Town	3–3	Wrexham	Northampton
15:00 BST	F.Belfon; W.Gage; T.Austin			Stadium: County Ground; Attendance: 1,189

5 May 1984 45	Bury	1–2	Northampton Town	Bury
15:15 BST			B.Mundee; R.Lewis	Stadium: Gigg Lane; Attendance: 1,096

12 May 1984 46	Mansfield Town	3–1	Northampton Town	Mansfield
15:00 BST	D.Caldwell; C.Calderwood		B.Jeffrey	Stadium: Field Mill; Attendance: 2,143

=== FA Cup ===
19 November 1983 First round	Northampton Town	1–1	Waterlooville	Northampton
15:00 GMT	W.Gage			Stadium: County Ground; Attendance: 2,627

23 November 1983 First round (r)	Waterlooville	1–1	Northampton Town	Waterlooville
19:30 GMT			T.Austin	Stadium: Jubilee Park; Attendance: 3,500

29 November 1983 First round (r2)	Northampton Town	2–0	Waterlooville	Northampton
19:30 GMT	T.O'Neill; B.Mundee			Stadium: County Ground; Attendance: 3,534

10 December 1983 Second round	Northampton Town	1–1	Telford United	Northampton
19:30 GMT	T.Austin			Stadium: County Ground; Attendance: 3,903

14 December 1983 Second round (r)	Telford United	3–2	Northampton Town	Telford
19:30 GMT			B.Jeffrey; M.Muir	Stadium: Bucks Head; Attendance: 3,320

=== League Cup ===
29 August 1983 First round 1st leg	Millwall	3–0	Northampton Town	New Cross, London
15:00 BST				Stadium: The Old Den; Attendance: 4,158; Referee: Allan Gunn

13 September 1983 First round 2nd leg	Northampton Town	1–2	Millwall	Northampton
19:30 BST	W.Gage			Stadium: County Ground; Attendance: 2,313

=== Associate Members' Cup ===
21 February 1984 First round (s)	Walsall	3–1	Northampton Town	Walsall
19:30 GMT			T.Austin	Stadium: Fellows Park; Attendance: 3,190

=== Appearances and goals ===
Pos	Player	Division Four			FA Cup			League Cup			League Trophy			Total		
Pos	Player	Starts	Sub	Goals	Starts	Sub	Goals	Starts	Sub	Goals	Starts	Sub	Goals	Starts	Sub	Goals
GK	Peter Gleasure	46	–	–	5	–	–	2	–	–	1	–	–	54	–	–
DF	Adrian Burrows	45	–	–	5	–	–	2	–	–	1	–	–	53	–	–
DF	Martyn Forster	41	1	–	5	–	–	1	–	–	1	–	–	48	1	–
DF	Wakeley Gage	40	–	6	5	–	1	2	–	1	1	–	–	48	–	8
DF	Russell Lewis	45	–	4	5	–	–	2	–	–	1	–	–	–	–	–
DF	Brian Mundee	33	3	1	4	–	1	–	–	–	1	–	–	38	3	2
DF	Barry Tucker	25	1	1	1	–	–	2	–	–	–	–	–	28	1	1
MF	Neil Brough	3	2	–	–	–	–	–	–	–	–	–	–	3	2	–
MF	Steve Brown	–	1	–	–	–	–	–	–	–	–	–	–	–	1	–
MF	Austin Hayes	40	3	9	5	–	–	2	–	–	1	–	–	48	3	9
MF	Billy Jeffrey	44	1	4	5	–	1	2	–	–	1	–	–	52	1	5
MF	Aidy Mann	2	–	–	–	–	–	–	–	–	–	–	–	2	–	–
MF	Eui Martinez	12	–	2	–	–	–	–	–	–	–	–	–	12	–	2
MF	Maurice Muir	5	10	–	1	4	1	–	1	–	–	–	–	6	15	1
MF	Tommy O'Neill	43	–	6	5	–	1	2	–	–	1	–	–	51	–	7
MF	Ray Train	–	–	–	–	–	–	–	–	–	–	–	–	–	–	–
FW	Terry Austin	42	1	10	5	–	2	1	1	–	1	–	1	49	2	13
FW	Frankie Belfon	35	5	9	4	–	–	2	–	–	1	–	–	42	5	9
FW	Dave Syrett	5	1	1	–	–	–	1	–	–	–	–	–	6	1	1
Players who left before end of season:
GK	Mark Kendall	–	–	–	–	–	–	–	–	–	–	–	–	–	–	–
DF	Ian Phillips	–	–	–	–	–	–	1	–	–	–	–	–	1	–	–
