= 1985–86 Nottingham Forest F.C. season =

English football club season

Nottingham Forest F.C.
1985–86 season
- Chairman: Maurice Roworth
- Manager: Brian Clough
- Stadium: The City Ground
- First Division: 8th
- FA Cup: Third round
- League Cup: Fourth round
- Top goalscorer: League: Nigel Clough (15); All: Clough (18)
Home colours	Away colours

The 1985–86 season was Nottingham Forest's 121st year in existence and ninth consecutive season in the First Division. Also the club competed in the FA Cup and League Cup.

== Summary ==
During summer the Board appointed Archie Gemmill as its new coach assistant, the former midfielder returned to the club after six seasons. Another arrival was midfielder Neil Webb in June, manager Brian Clough paid Portsmouth £250,000 reinforcing an ageing squad. To reinforce the defensive line, Left-back Defender Stuart Pearce was brought by manager Brian Clough. Pearce was the makeweight in a £300,000 deal that saw Coventry City centre-back Ian Butterworth move to Forest. The already ageing squad is rebuilding for this season, Dutch Goalkeeper Hans Segers with several injuries was replaced by Steve Sutton as starter. In defence, after the departure of Kenny Swain the right back position was covered by Northern Irish Gary Fleming. Central backs Paul Hart and Chris Fairclough were replaced by arrival Buttersworth and young defender Des Walker who had his breakthrough as starter. On the left back Scottish Jim McInally left his post as starter being replaced by arrival young defender Stuart Pearce. In the midfield, Clough reinforced the line with Right winger Franz Carr (he was already in the team since August 1984) and the new arrival Neil Webb for the central midfield amongst Metgod and veteran Ian Bowyer. The strikers line was completed by young forward Nigel Clough and veteran Davenport who clinched a transfer to Manchester United on 12 March 1986 for a fee of £750,000.

The rebuilding had a cost for the club finishing on a mediocre 8th spot in League. The club opted out of Full Members' Cup in its 1985–86 edition.

== Squad ==
Note: Flags indicate national team as defined under FIFA eligibility rules; some limited exceptions apply. Players may hold more than one non-FIFA nationality.

Pos.	Nation	Player
GK	ENG	Steve Sutton
GK	NED	Hans Segers
GK	ENG	Darren Heyes
DF	NIR	Gary Fleming
DF	ENG	Des Walker
DF	SCO	Jim McInally
DF	ENG	Ian Butterworth
DF	ENG	Chris Fairclough
DF	ENG	Brett Williams
DF	ENG	Stuart Pearce
MF	ENG	Franz Carr
MF	ENG	Ian Bowyer (c)
MF	NED	Johnny Metgod
MF	NIR	David Campbell

Pos.	Nation	Player
MF	ENG	Neil Webb
MF	ENG	Gary Mills
MF	ENG	Steve Wigley
MF	SCO	Colin Walsh
MF	ENG	Steve Hodge
MF	SCO	Brian Rice
MF	SCO	John Robertson
MF	SCO	Steven Murray
MF	ENG	Leigh Palin
FW	ENG	Peter Davenport
FW	ENG	Garry Birtles
FW	ENG	Nigel Clough
FW	ENG	Mick Perry
FW	ENG	David Riley

=== Transfers ===
In
Pos.	Name	from	Type
DF	Stuart Pearce	Coventry City	£238,000
MF	Neil Webb	Portsmouth	£210,000
MF	Brian Rice	Hibernian	£182,000
DF	Ian Butterworth	Coventry City	
MF	John Robertson	Derby County	
MF	Leigh Palin	Aston Villa	
DF	Brett Williams		
MF	Archie Gemmill		
MF	Steven Murray		
FW	Mick Perry		

Out
Pos.	Name	To	Type
MF	Steve Hodge	Aston Villa	£450,000
DF	Kenny Swain	Portsmouth	
DF	Bryn Gunn	Shrewsbury Town	loan
DF	Paul Hart	Sheffield Wednesday	
MF	Paul Raynor	Huddersfield Town	
FW	David Longhurst	Halifax Town	

==== Winter ====
In
Pos.	Name	from	Type

Out
Pos.	Name	To	Type
DF	Bryn Gunn	Walsall	loan
DF	Mark Smalley	Birmingham City	
DF	Alan Davidson	South Melbourne	
FW	Paul Kee	Southampton	

==== Spring ====
In
Pos.	Name	from	Type

Out
Pos.	Name	To	Type
DF	Bryn Gunn	Mansfield Town	loan
FW	Peter Davenport	Manchester United	£657,000

== Results ==
=== Division One ===
==== League table ====
Pos	Team	Pld	W	D	L	GF	GA	GD	Pts
6	Chelsea	42	20	11	11	57	56	+1	71
7	Arsenal	42	20	9	13	49	47	+2	69
8	Nottingham Forest	42	19	11	12	69	53	+16	68
9	Luton Town	42	18	12	12	61	44	+17	66
10	Tottenham Hotspur	42	19	8	15	74	52	+22	65

Source: World Football
Rules for classification: 1) Points; 2) Goal difference; 3) Goals scored

==== Results by round ====
Round	1	2	3	4	5	6	7	8	9	10	11	12	13	14	15	16	17	18	19	20	21	22	23	24	25	26	27	28	29	30	31	32	33	34	35	36	37	38	39	40	41	42
Ground	A	H	H	A	H	A	A	H	H	A	H	A	A	H	H	A	H	A	H	A	H	A	A	H	H	A	A	H	H	A	H	H	A	H	H	A	A	H	A	A	H	A
Result	D	L	W	L	L	L	W	L	W	L	W	W	W	W	W	L	L	D	D	L	W	L	W	D	W	W	W	W	L	L	D	W	D	W	W	D	D	D	W	D	D	W
Position	12	19	12	14	18	20	16	17	15	16	15	12	9	8	7	9	10	10	10	11	10	10	11	10	9	9	8	6	7	9	10	10	10	10	8	8	8	8	7	7	8	8

Source: https://www.11v11.com/teams/nottingham-forest/tab/matches/season/1985/
A = Away; H = Home; W = Win; D = Draw; L = Lost; = Champions, Disqualified to 1986–87 European Cup; = Disqualified to 1986–87 UEFA Cup; = Relegated to Division Two

On June 2, 1985, English teams were banned by UEFA from its competitions from the season 1985–86 on until the season 1990–91 because of the Heysel Disaster in 1985, involving Liverpool fans.

==== Matches ====
- .- Source: https://www.11v11.com/teams/nottingham-forest/tab/matches/season/1986/

17 August 1985 1	Luton Town	1–1	Nottingham Forest	Luton
	Brian Stein 20'	12	52' Neil Webb	Stadium: Kenilworth Road; Attendance: 11,318; Referee: JE Martin

21 August 1985 2	Nottingham Forest	0–1	Sheffield Wednesday	West Bridgford
		19	Simon Stainrod 2'	Stadium: City Ground; Attendance: 18,367

24 August 1985 3	Nottingham Forest	2–1	Southampton	West Bridgford
	Johnny Metgod 22'; Mark Wright 44' (o.g.)	12	65' David Armstrong	Stadium: City Ground; Attendance: 12,643; Referee: Art. Robinson

27 August 1985 4	Queens Park Rangers	2–1	Nottingham Forest	White City
	Gary Bannister 6'; Terry Fenwick 37' (pen.)	14	17' Neil Webb	Stadium: Loftus Road; Attendance: 10,748; Referee: JC Deakin

31 August 1985 5	Nottingham Forest	1–3	Manchester United	West Bridgford
	Peter Davenport 46'	18	2'Mark Hughes; 5'Peter Barnes; 40' Frank Stapleton	Stadium: City Ground; Attendance: 26,274; Referee: KS Hackett

3 September 1985 6	Liverpool	2–0	Nottingham Forest	Liverpool
	Ronnie Whelan 55', 70'	20		Stadium: Anfield; Attendance: 27,135; Referee: T Mills

8 September 1985 7	Leicester City	0–3	Nottingham Forest	Leicester
			Neil Webb 35'; Peter Davenport 78'; Brian Rice 89'	Attendance: 14,247; Referee: TJ Holbrook

14 September 1985 8	Nottingham Forest	0–1	Tottenham Hotspur	West Bridgford
			85' Hughton	Stadium: City Ground; Attendance: 14,247; Referee: TJ Holbrook

21 September 1985 9	Nottingham Forest	3–2	Watford	West Bridgford
	Neil Webb 35'; Peter Davenport 78'; Brian Rice 89'	15	34' Callaghan; 90' Rostron	Stadium: City Ground; Attendance: 14,247; Referee: TJ Holbrook

28 September 1985 10	West Ham United	2–4	Nottingham Forest	Upton Park
	Tony Cottee 6'; Frank McAvennie 12', 20'; Alan Dickens 59'	16	61'Johnny Metgod; 70'Nigel Clough	Stadium: Boleyn Ground; Attendance: 14,540; Referee: DJ Axcell

5 October 1985 11	Nottingham Forest	3–1	Ipswich Town	West Bridgford
	Stuart Pearce 8'; Ian Bowyer 11', 27'	15	48' Ian Atkins	Stadium: City Ground; Attendance: 12,120; Referee: TA Jones

12 October 1985 12	Aston Villa	2–1	Nottingham Forest	Birmingham
	Colin Gibson 67'	12	60' (o.g.) Brendan Ormsby; 72'Nigel Clough	Stadium: Villa Park; Attendance: 15,315; Referee: AN Buksh

19 October 1985 13	Newcastle United	0–3	Nottingham Forest	Newcastle-upon-Tyne
		9	28' Brian Rice; 78', 87' Peter Davenport	Attendance: 23,304; Referee: NL Wilson

26 October 1985 14	Nottingham Forest	3–2	Arsenal	West Bridgford
	Peter Davenport 29' (pen.), 65', 72'	8	89' Graham Rix; 90' Paul Davis	Stadium: City Ground; Attendance: 17,756; Referee: J McAulay

3 November 1985 15	Nottingham Forest	2–1	West Bromwich Albion	West Bridgford
	Neil Webb 38'; Peter Davenport 75' (pen.)	7	44' Steve Hunt	Stadium: City Ground; Attendance: 19,610; Referee: N Midgley

9 November 1985 16	Chelsea	4–2	Nottingham Forest	Fulham
	David Speedie 1'; Kerry Dixon 24', 61'; Micky Hazard 35' (pen.)	9	10', 55' Nigel Clough	Stadium: Stamford Bridge; Attendance: 17,743; Referee: RG Milford

16 November 1985 17	Nottingham Forest	0–2	Manchester City	West Bridgford
		10	28' Clive Wilson; 55' Paul Simpson	Stadium: City Ground; Attendance: 15,140; Referee: VG Callow

23 November 1985 18	Everton	1–1	Nottingham Forest	Walton
	Paul Bracewell 76'	10	70' Nigel Clough	Stadium: Goodison Park; Attendance: 27,869; Referee: J Lovatt

1 December 1985 19	Nottingham Forest	1–1	Oxford United	West Bridgford
	Peter Davenport 59' (pen.)	10	19' Andy Thomas	Stadium: City Ground; Attendance: 15,317; Referee: PA Tyldesley

7 December 1985 20	Sheffield Wednesday	2–1	Nottingham Forest	Sheffield
	Brian Marwood 57'; Mark Chamberlain 85'	11	54' Neil Webb	Stadium: Hillsborough; Attendance: 22,495; Referee: TJ Holbrook

14 December 1985 21	Nottingham Forest	2–0	Luton Town	West Bridgford
	Nigel Clough 30'; Neil Webb 78'	10		Stadium: City Ground; Attendance: 12,078; Referee: JE Bray

20 December 1985 22	Southampton	3–1	Nottingham Forest	Southampton
	Steve Moran 10', 38'; David Armstrong 73'	10	43' Franz Carr	Stadium: The Dell; Attendance: 12,500; Referee: HW King

26 December 1985 23	Birmingham City	0–1	Nottingham Forest	Birmingham
		11	17' Neil Webb	Stadium: St Andrews; Attendance: 10,378; Referee: K Walmsley

28 December 1985 24	Nottingham Forest	1–1	Liverpool	West Bridgford
	Neil Webb 11'	10	55' Kevin MacDonald	Stadium: City Ground; Attendance: 27,141; Referee: KW Baker

1 January 1986 25	Nottingham Forest	5–2	Coventry City	West Bridgford
	Neil Webb 40', 52', 76'; Johnny Metgod 80'; Peter Davenport 84'	9	19' Cyrille Regis; 20' Micky Adams	Stadium: City Ground; Attendance: 13,860; Referee: MJ Cotton

11 January 1986 26	Tottenham Hotspur	0–3	Nottingham Forest	Tottenham
		9	47', 69' Peter Davenport; 51' Colin Walsh	Stadium: White Hart Lane; Attendance: 19,043; Referee: RG Milford

18 January 1986 27	Manchester United	2–3	Nottingham Forest	Manchester
	Jesper Olsen 46' (pen.), 67'	8	43', 80' Colin Walsh; 88' Nigel Clough	Stadium: Old Trafford; Attendance: 46,717; Referee: JM Key

1 February 1986 28	Nottingham Forest	4–0	Queens Park Rangers	West Bridgford
	Colin Walsh 20', 84'; Franz Carr 27'; Neil Webb 59'	6		Stadium: City Ground; Attendance: 11,538; Referee: T Fitzharris

8 February 1986 29	Nottingham Forest	1–2	Newcastle United	West Bridgford
	Colin Walsh 80'	7	66', 73' Peter Beardsley	Stadium: City Ground; Attendance: 15,388; Referee: JW Lloyd

8 March 1986 30	Ipswich Town	1–0	Nottingham Forest	Ipswich
		9	Terry Butcher 52'	Stadium: Portman Road; Attendance: 12,827; Referee: DV Reeves

15 March 1986 31	Nottingham Forest	1–1	Aston Villa	West Bridgford
	Nigel Clough 62' (pen.)	10	72' Mark Walters	Stadium: City Ground; Attendance: 12,933; Referee: JA Moules

22 March 1986 32	Nottingham Forest	4–3	Leicester City	West Bridgford
	Ian Bowyer 7'; Franz Carr 38'; Nigel Clough 65', 89'	10	5', 68'Alan Smith; 48' Tony Sealy	Stadium: City Ground; Attendance: 14,484; Referee: D Scott

29 March 1986 33	Coventry City	0–0	Nottingham Forest	Coventry
		10		Stadium: Highfield Road; Attendance: 9,447; Referee: C Downey

31 March 1986 34	Nottingham Forest	3–0	Birmingham City	West Bridgford
	Nigel Clough 28' (pen.); Johnny Metgod 46'; Neil Webb 88'	10		Stadium: City Ground; Attendance: 12,134; Referee: JB Worrall

2 April 1986 35	Nottingham Forest	2–1	West Ham United	West Bridgford
	Johnny Metgod 39'; Brian Rice 88'	8	69' Tony Cottee	Stadium: City Ground; Attendance: 17,498; Referee: LR Dilkes

5 April 1986 36	West Bromwich Albion	1–1	Nottingham Forest	West Bromwich
	Martyn Bennett 76'	8	21' Johnny Metgod	Attendance: 7,901; Referee: CC Trussell

8 April 1986 37	Arsenal	1–1	Nottingham Forest	Islington
	Ian Allinson 19' (pen.)	8	65' David Campbell	Stadium: Highbury; Attendance: 15,087; Referee: LM Robinson

12 April 1986 38	Nottingham Forest	0–0	Chelsea	West Bridgford
		8		Stadium: City Ground; Attendance: 18,055; Referee: D Shaw

19 April 1986 39	Manchester City	2–1	Nottingham Forest	Moss Side
	Gordon Davies 85'	7	71'Neil Webb; 82' David Campbell	Stadium: Maine Road; Attendance: 19,715; Referee: J Lovatt

21 April 1986 40	Watford	1–1	Nottingham Forest	Watford
12:00	John Barnes 12'	7	22' Nigel Clough	Stadium: Vicarage Road; Attendance: 11,510; Referee: A Gunn

26 April 1986 41	Nottingham Forest	0–0	Everton	West Bridgford
		8		Stadium: City Ground; Attendance: 30,171; Referee: B Hill

3 May 1986 42	Oxford United	2–1	Nottingham Forest	Oxford
15:00	Jeremy Charles 27'	8	16', 81' Nigel Clough	Stadium: Manor Ground; Attendance: 11,842; Referee: RL Hamer

=== League Cup ===
25 September 1985 2	Nottingham Forest	4–0	Bolton Wanderers	Nottingham
	David Campbell 66', 74'; Brian Rice 70'; Nigel Clough 79'			Stadium: City Ground; Attendance: 10,530; Referee: PW Vanes

8 October 1985 2	Bolton Wanderers	3–0 (0–7 agg.)	Nottingham Forest
			Brian Rice 62'; Peter Davenport 74'; Nigel Clough 84'	Attendance: 4,010; Referee: D Hutchinson

30 October 1985 3	Derby County	1–2	Nottingham Forest	Derby
	Jeff Chandler 9' (pen.)		12'Johnny Metgod; 68' Franz Carr	Stadium: Baseball Ground; Attendance: 25,000; Referee: D Shaw

25 November 1985 4	Queens Park Rangers	3–1	Nottingham Forest	White City
	Terry Fenwick 8' (pen.); Gary Bannister 87'; John Byrne 90'		80' Nigel Clough	Stadium: Loftus Road; Attendance: 13,052; Referee: ML James

=== FA Cup ===
4 January 1985 3	Nottingham Forest	1–1	Blackburn Rovers	Nottingham
	Garry Birtles 65'		43' Chris Thompson	Stadium: City Ground; Attendance: 15,772; Referee: G Courtney

13 January 1986 3	Blackburn Rovers	3–2	Nottingham Forest	Blackburn
	John Lowey 17'; Noel Brotherston 42'; Chris Thompson 44'		24' Colin Walsh; 88' Garry Birtles	Stadium: Ewood Park; Attendance: 11,710; Referee: G Courtney

== Statistics ==
=== Squad statistics ===
No.	Pos	Nat	Player	Total		Football League Division One		FA Cup		Football League Cup	
No.	Pos	Nat	Player	Apps	Goals	Apps	Goals	Apps	Goals	Apps	Goals
	GK	(England) ENG	Steve Sutton	36	0	31	0	2	0	3	0
	DF	(Northern Ireland) NIR	Gary Fleming	16	0	16	0	0	0	0	0
	DF	(England) ENG	Ian Butterworth	27	0	22+1	0	1	0	3	0
	DF	(England) ENG	Des Walker	43	0	36+3	0	2	0	2	0
	DF	(England) ENG	Stuart Pearce	34	1	30	1	0	0	4	0
	MF	(England) ENG	Ian Bowyer	28	3	25+1	3	2	0	0	0
	MF	(England) ENG	Neil Webb	44	14	38	14	2	0	4	0
	MF	(Netherlands) NED	Johnny Metgod	45	7	37+2	6	2	0	4	1
	MF	(England) ENG	Franz Carr	25	4	23	3	0	0	1+1	1
	FW	(England) ENG	Nigel Clough	45	18	37+2	15	2	0	4	3
	FW	(England) ENG	Peter Davenport	33	14	27	13	2	0	4	1
	GK	(Netherlands) NED	Hans Segers	12	0	11	0	0	0	1	0
	FW	(England) ENG	Garry Birtles	30	2	24+1	0	2	2	3	0
	MF	(Scotland) SCO	Brian Rice	22	5	19	3	0	0	3	2
	MF	(Scotland) SCO	Colin Walsh	24	7	16+4	6	1+1	1	1+1	0
	MF	(Northern Ireland) NIR	David Campbell	19	5	14+4	3	0	0	1	2
	MF	(England) ENG	Gary Mills	18	0	13+1	0	1	0	3	0
	DF	(Scotland) SCO	Jim McInally	13	0	12	0	0	0	1	0
	DF	(England) ENG	Brett Williams	13	0	11	0	2	0	0	0
	MF	(Scotland) SCO	John Robertson	12	0	10+1	0	1	0	0	0
	MF	(England) ENG	Steve Wigley	10	0	8	0	0	0	2	0
	MF	(England) ENG	Steve Hodge	2	0	2	0	0	0	0	0
	MF	(Scotland) SCO	Archie Gemmill	0	0	0	0	0	0	0	0
	MF	(Scotland) SCO	Steven Murray	0	0	0	0	0	0	0	0
	MF	(England) ENG	Leigh Palin	0	0	0	0	0	0	0	0
	FW	(England) ENG	Mick Perry	0	0	0	0	0	0	0	0
	GK	(England) ENG	Darren Heyes	0	0	0	0	0	0	0	0
	DF	(England) ENG	Chris Fairclough	0	0	0	0	0	0	0	0
	FW	(England) ENG	David Riley								

- Source: https://www.11v11.com/teams/nottingham-forest/tab/players/season/1986/
