= Ian Thompson (footballer, born 1958) =

English footballer

Personal information
- Date of birth: 8 June 1958 (age 68)
- Place of birth: Dartford, England
- Height: 6 ft 1 in (1.85 m)
- Position: Forward

Senior career*
Years	Team	Apps	(Gls)
- Welling United
- Andover
1980-81	Poole Town		
1981–1983	Salisbury	77	(43)
1983–1986	AFC Bournemouth	121	(30)
1986–1988	Salisbury	59	(12)
1988–1989	Newport County	?	(?)
1989–1992	Merthyr Tydfil	?	(32)
1992	Haverfordwest County	16	(12)
1992–1993	Inter Cardiff	?	(?)
- * Club domestic league appearances and goals

Ian P. Thompson (born 8 June 1958) is an English former professional footballer who played as a forward in the Football League.

== Career ==
He started his career with Welling United in the Athenian League, before representing Southern League clubs Andover, Poole Town and Salisbury. In his first full season with the latter, Thompson finished as leading scorer with 19 goals, following that with 24 goals in his second year, before being sold to AFC Bournemouth for £18,000 (a Salisbury record fee at that time). He scored for AFC Bournemouth in their 2-0 giantkilling win over Manchester United in the FA Cup in January 1984. He also played as Bournemouth won the inaugural Associate Members' Cup by beating Hull City in the final. After injury led to him retiring from full-time football, he returned to Salisbury before becoming a schoolteacher in Wales, continuing his football career with Newport County, Merthyr Tydfil, Haverfordwest County and Inter Cardiff.

== Honours ==
Bournemouth

- Associate Members' Cup: 1983–84
