= Paul Morrell (footballer) =

English footballer

Personal information
- Full name: Paul David Morrell
- Date of birth: 23 March 1961 (age 65)
- Place of birth: Poole, England
- Height: 5 ft 11 in (1.80 m)
- Position: Left back

Senior career*
Years	Team	Apps	(Gls)
- Weymouth
1983–1993	Bournemouth	343	(8)
- Sing Tao SC
1995	Salisbury City		(2)
- * Club domestic league appearances and goals

Paul David Morrell (born 23 March 1961) is an English former footballer who played as a defender in the Football League for Bournemouth. He scored the winning goal in the first Football League Trophy Final, then known as the Associate Members' Cup, when Bournemouth beat Hull City 2–1 at Boothferry Park on 24 May 1984. He later played for Sing Tao SC in Hong Kong, and Salisbury City in the Southern League.

He later worked for the probation service in the Bournemouth area.

== Honours ==
Bournemouth

- Football League Third Division: 1986–87
- Associate Members' Cup: 1983–84
