= Mundee =

Mundee is a surname. Notable people with the surname include:

- Brian Mundee (born 1964), English footballer
- Denny Mundee (born 1968), English footballer
- Fred Mundee (1913–1990), American football player
