= Stewart Mell =

English footballer

Personal information
- Full name: Stewart Albert Mell
- Date of birth: 15 October 1957 (age 69)
- Place of birth: Doncaster, England
- Height: 5 ft 10 in (1.78 m)
- Position: Striker

Youth career
- Hull City

Senior career*
Years	Team	Apps	(Gls)
19??–1979	Appleby Frodingham		
1979–1983	Doncaster Rovers	76	(14)
1983–1984	Halifax Town	30	(8)
1984–1986	Burton Albion		
1986–1989	Scarborough	79	(24)
1988	→ Boston United (loan)	4	(1)
–	Goole Town		

International career
1985	England Semi-pro	1	(0)
- * Club domestic league appearances and goals

Stewart Albert Mell (born 15 October 1957) is an English former professional footballer who scored 30 goals from 145 appearances in the Football League, playing for Doncaster Rovers, Halifax Town and Scarborough. He began his football career as a youngster with Hull City, played non-league football for Appleby Frodingham, Burton Albion, Boston United and Goole Town, and was a member of the Scarborough team that won the 1986–87 Football Conference to become the first club automatically promoted to the Football League. While a Burton Albion player, he was capped for England at semi-professional level.

== Football career ==
Mell began his football career as an apprentice with Hull City, but never played for the first team. He moved on to local Lincolnshire League side Appleby Frodingham before joining Football League Fourth Division club Doncaster Rovers, initially on a non-contract basis. He made his first-team debut on 29 December 1979 in a 2–1 home defeat to Huddersfield Town. He played irregularly over the next two and a half seasons, helping the club gain promotion to the Third Division in 1981, and scoring winning goals against Crystal Palace, Millwall and Fulham that contributed to their avoiding relegation in 1981–82. He spent the 1983–84 season back in the Fourth Division with Halifax Town before moving into the Northern Premier League with Burton Albion.

In 1984, Burton knocked Football League club Aldershot out of the FA Cup with goals from Mell and Nigel Simms. While a Burton player, Mell won his only cap for the England semi-professional representative eleven; he played against Wales in 1985, without scoring. In the 1986 close season, Mell followed Burton manager Neil Warnock to Conference club Scarborough.

Partnered in attack by Phil Walker or Stewart Hamill, Mell was Scarborough's leading scorer with 16 Conference goals (18 in all competitions) as they won the division, six points clear of favourites Barnet, to become the first team to benefit from the introduction of direct promotion and relegation between Conference and League in place of the longstanding re-election system. He scored at each end of the run of 13 consecutive away wins that made a major contribution to their progression from mid-season mid-table to the penultimate game of the season that confirmed them as champions.

Mell scored Scarborough's first goal in the Football League, on the opening day of the 1987–88 season, a 2–2 draw at home to Wolverhampton Wanderers marred by £20,000-worth of damage to the ground, fighting on the terraces, 54 arrests, and a visiting supporter falling through the roof of a stand. He finished the season as the club's top scorer for the second year running, with ten goals in all competitions.

He played rarely in Scarborough's second league season. In October 1988, he joined conference club Boston United on a month's loan. He made four appearances and scored once, in his first game for the club, a 5–0 defeat of Barnet. After 79 appearances in League and Conference for Scarborough, Mell finished his football career back in non-League football with Goole Town.

== Personal life ==
Mell was born in Doncaster, which was then in the West Riding of Yorkshire. He worked as a firefighter during much of his football career, and as of 2007, was still employed in the fire service, based in Hull.
