= Bobby McNeil =

Scottish footballer

Personal information
- Full name: Robert Muirhead McNeil
- Date of birth: 1 November 1962 (age 63)
- Place of birth: Hamilton, Scotland
- Height: 5 ft 9 in (1.75 m)
- Position: Defender

Senior career*
Years	Team	Apps	(Gls)
1980–1985	Hull City	138	(3)
1985–1986	Lincoln City	4	(0)
1985–1987	Preston North End	43	(0)
1987–1988	Carlisle United	19	(0)
- Bridlington Town
Total		204	(3)
- * Club domestic league appearances and goals

Robert Muirhead McNeil (born 1 November 1962) is a Scottish former footballer who played in the Football League for Hull City, Lincoln City, Preston North End and Carlisle United.

== Honours ==
Hull City

- Associate Members' Cup runner-up: 1983–84
