= 1986–87 Football Conference =

Football Conference
- Season: 1986–87
- Champions: Scarborough (1st Football Conference title)
- Promoted to the Football League: Scarborough
- Conference League Cup winners: Kettering Town
- FA Trophy winners: Kidderminster Harriers
- Relegated to Level 6: Frickley Athletic, Gateshead, Nuneaton Borough
- Matches: 462
- Goals: 1,403 (3.04 per match)
- Top goalscorer: Kim Casey (Kidderminster Harriers), 38
- Biggest home win: Sutton United – Kettering Town 8–0
- Biggest away win: Gateshead – Barnet 1–5; Nuneaton Borough – Boston United 1–5; Kidderminster Harriers – Telford United 0–4; Nuneaton Borough – Weymouth 0–4; Wealdstone – Boston United 0–4
- Highest scoring: Runcorn – Northwich Victoria 7–3
- Longest winning run: ?
- Longest unbeaten run: ?
- Longest losing run: ?
- Highest attendance: ?
- Lowest attendance: ?
- Average attendance: 917

The Football Conference season of 1986–87 (known as the GM Vauxhall Conference for sponsorship reasons) was the eighth season of the Football Conference, the first season under this name, this league having earlier been known as the Alliance Premier League.

== Overview ==
This was the first season of automatic promotion for champions of the Conference, following the abolition of the re-election system, and automatic relegation to the Conference for the bottom placed team in the Football League Fourth Division. Scarborough finished the season as Conference champions, and so won automatic promotion to the Football League at the expense of Lincoln City.

== New teams in the league this season ==
- Gateshead (promoted 1985–86)
- Sutton United (promoted 1985–86)
- Welling United (promoted 1985–86)

== Final league table ==
Pos	Team	Pld	W	D	L	GF	GA	GD	Pts	Promotion or relegation
1	Scarborough (C, P)	42	27	10	5	64	33	+31	91	Promotion to the Football League Fourth Division
2	Barnet	42	25	10	7	86	39	+47	85	
3	Maidstone United	42	21	10	11	71	48	+23	73	
4	Enfield	42	21	7	14	66	47	+19	70	
5	Altrincham	42	18	15	9	66	53	+13	69	
6	Boston United	42	21	6	15	82	74	+8	69	
7	Sutton United	42	19	11	12	81	51	+30	68	
8	Runcorn	42	18	13	11	71	58	+13	67	
9	Telford United	42	18	10	14	69	59	+10	64	
10	Bath City	42	17	12	13	63	62	+1	63	
11	Cheltenham Town	42	16	13	13	64	50	+14	61	
12	Kidderminster Harriers	42	17	4	21	77	81	−4	55	
13	Stafford Rangers	42	14	11	17	58	60	−2	53	
14	Weymouth	42	13	12	17	68	77	−9	51	
15	Dagenham	42	14	7	21	56	72	−16	49	
16	Kettering Town	42	12	11	19	54	66	−12	47	
17	Northwich Victoria	42	10	14	18	53	69	−16	44	
18	Nuneaton Borough (R)	42	10	14	18	48	73	−25	44	Demoted to the Southern League Premier Division (Note: Nuneaton Borough were relegated due to financial irregularities.)
19	Wealdstone	42	11	10	21	50	70	−20	43	
20	Welling United	42	10	10	22	61	84	−23	40	
21	Frickley Athletic (R)	42	7	11	24	47	82	−35	32	Relegation to the Northern Premier League Premier Division
22	Gateshead (R)	42	6	13	23	48	95	−47	31	Relegation to the Northern Premier League Premier Division

(C) Champions; (P) Promoted; (R) Relegated

== Results ==
Home \ Away	ALT	BAR	BAT	BOS	CHL	DAG	ENF	FRK	GAT	KET	KID	MDS	NOR	NUN	RUN	SCA	STA	SUT	TEL	WEA	WEL	WEY
Altrincham		2–0	1–1	3–1	2–0	0–2	0–1	1–1	1–1	4–1	3–1	4–0	1–1	2–2	0–0	1–0	2–0	2–1	2–1	1–2	1–1	2–1
Barnet	1–0		2–1	5–1	0–1	1–0	1–0	3–0	3–1	1–2	5–2	3–1	4–0	4–1	3–0	2–2	1–2	1–2	2–2	2–1	1–1	2–2
Bath City	1–1	0–1		4–2	0–0	2–0	1–3	4–2	1–1	1–2	3–2	1–0	1–1	2–3	1–2	0–3	4–2	1–3	3–1	2–0	1–1	2–1
Boston United	4–2	0–3	1–2		1–1	1–0	5–1	2–2	6–0	2–1	2–1	0–3	0–1	2–1	2–0	1–3	2–0	0–0	2–3	2–0	4–3	1–1
Cheltenham Town	1–1	1–2	1–1	1–3		6–1	2–0	2–0	4–2	3–1	1–2	2–0	5–2	1–1	1–1	2–3	2–1	1–2	3–1	0–1	2–0	2–0
Dagenham	3–1	1–3	1–2	3–2	1–1		0–3	0–1	0–0	1–2	3–1	0–2	3–3	3–1	3–2	0–2	1–0	2–1	3–1	1–0	1–1	2–0
Enfield	0–2	0–3	1–0	2–3	2–2	1–0		0–0	1–1	0–0	3–0	0–1	1–2	3–1	5–0	0–1	2–0	0–0	3–1	4–2	0–2	4–0
Frickley Athletic	2–2	0–3	2–2	0–1	0–2	1–3	1–4		3–1	0–1	2–2	0–2	1–1	1–1	0–2	0–2	2–1	1–1	4–2	3–1	3–1	2–2
Gateshead	1–3	1–5	1–2	1–3	1–1	3–2	1–2	2–0		1–1	2–4	1–4	1–1	3–2	1–3	0–1	2–2	1–1	0–2	1–1	1–1	1–4
Kettering Town	0–2	1–1	2–0	1–2	0–0	3–1	2–0	1–2	5–1		0–2	1–2	1–0	2–2	1–1	1–2	2–2	1–4	3–1	0–2	5–1	3–0
Kidderminster Harriers	3–0	0–3	2–4	1–2	5–1	4–2	3–4	4–1	3–1	2–1		2–2	1–2	3–0	3–2	0–1	1–1	0–0	0–4	5–2	2–0	1–1
Maidstone United	3–0	1–0	0–0	2–2	1–1	2–1	0–2	1–0	3–0	3–0	5–0		5–2	2–0	3–2	2–1	2–3	0–1	0–0	1–0	4–0	3–1
Northwich Victoria	1–1	1–2	1–1	4–0	1–0	2–3	2–0	1–1	1–2	0–0	1–2	1–1		1–2	1–2	0–1	1–1	0–1	1–0	2–1	2–1	1–1
Nuneaton Borough	2–2	1–3	1–0	1–5	0–0	3–3	2–0	2–1	1–1	0–0	1–2	2–0	0–1		1–0	3–0	0–0	1–1	0–2	1–1	1–2	0–4
Runcorn	1–1	1–1	0–1	3–1	1–0	4–0	1–1	1–0	4–0	1–0	4–3	3–2	7–3	1–1		0–2	3–1	3–2	3–0	1–1	2–2	1–1
Scarborough	2–2	0–0	1–1	0–0	1–3	2–1	1–1	4–2	3–2	1–0	2–1	0–0	2–1	1–0	1–2		2–0	2–1	0–0	2–1	2–0	2–1
Stafford Rangers	2–3	0–3	0–1	0–1	0–1	1–1	0–3	2–0	1–0	2–2	4–1	2–3	4–1	3–1	2–0	0–0		4–2	1–1	1–0	3–1	0–0
Sutton United	2–3	3–1	7–2	3–1	0–0	1–0	0–1	3–0	3–0	8–0	3–1	3–1	2–1	2–3	1–1	0–2	3–0		2–2	2–2	2–0	2–3
Telford United	4–0	0–1	4–2	5–2	3–1	0–2	2–1	4–1	2–1	2–0	2–1	1–1	1–0	1–1	2–2	0–0	0–0	0–2		1–3	2–1	5–1
Wealdstone	0–2	0–0	1–2	0–4	1–0	2–2	0–3	2–1	2–2	2–1	0–3	0–0	1–1	6–0	0–3	1–3	0–3	2–1	0–1		3–1	3–1
Welling United	0–1	1–1	1–1	4–2	1–3	1–0	2–3	3–2	3–4	0–3	1–0	2–2	3–2	1–2	3–0	1–3	2–4	3–1	1–3	1–1		5–0
Weymouth	2–2	3–3	1–2	3–4	4–3	3–0	0–1	3–2	0–1	2–0	2–1	4–1	2–2	1–0	1–1	0–1	1–3	2–2	3–0	3–2	3–2	

Updated to match(es) played on unknown. Source: Peter Dunk (ed.), Rothmans Football Yearbook 1987–88. Queen Anne Press, Macdonald Futura Publishers, London & Sydney, 1987.
Legend: Blue = home team win; Yellow = draw; Red = away team win.
Locations of the Football Conference teams 1986–1987
Locations of the Football Conference teams 1986–1987

== Topscorers ==
Rank	Player	Club	League	FA Cup	FA Trophy	League Cup	Total
1	(England) Kim Casey	Kidderminster Harriers	38	4	2	0	44
2	(England) Mick Carter	Runcorn	30	2	6	3	41
3	(England) Steve Butler	Maidstone United	24	5	3	2	34
4	(England) Gary Abbott	Welling United	23	2	3	0	28
=	(England) Chris Cook	Boston United	23	0	2	2	27
=	(England) Ken McKenna	Telford United	23	1	0	0	24
7	(England) Nicky Evans	Barnet	22	0	4	0	26
=	(Wales) Chris Townsend	Cheltenham Town	22	1	0	0	23
9	(England) Mike Doherty	Weymouth	16	0	1	1	18
=	(Wales) Paul Bodin	Bath City	16	2	2	1	21
=	(England) Stewart Mell	Scarborough	16	0	2	0	18
=	(England) John Timmons	Altrincham	16	0	0	1	17

== Promotion and relegation ==
=== Promoted ===
- Scarborough (to the Football League Fourth Division)
- Fisher Athletic (from the Isthmian League)
- Macclesfield Town (from the Northern Premier League)
- Wycombe Wanderers (from the Southern Premier League)

=== Relegated ===
- Lincoln City (from the Football League Fourth Division)
- Frickley Athletic (to the Northern Premier League)
- Gateshead (to the Northern Premier League)
- Nuneaton Borough (to the Southern Premier League)
