= William Chalmers (footballer, born 1912) =

Scottish footballer

Personal information
- Full name: William Ritchie Chalmers
- Date of birth: 11 February 1912
- Place of birth: Kirkcaldy, Scotland
- Date of death: 7 October 1943 (aged 31)
- Place of death: Grimsby, England
- Height: 5 ft 9 in (1.75 m)
- Position: Inside forward

Senior career*
| Years | Team | Apps | (Gls) |
- Newburgh West End
- Kirkcaldy Waverley
| 1930–1932 | Raith Rovers | | |
| 1932–1938 | Bournemouth & Boscombe Athletic | 153 | (17) |
| 1938–1939 | Barrow | 36 | (2) |
- * Club domestic league appearances and goals

William Ritchie Chalmers (11 February 1912 – 7 October 1943) was a Scottish professional footballer who played mainly as an inside left. He played in the Scottish League for Raith Rovers and made nearly 200 appearances in the English Football League for Bournemouth & Boscombe Athletic and Barrow.

== Football career ==
Chalmers played for Newburgh West End before joining Kirkcaldy club Waverley. In March 1930, the Courier and Advertiser wrote that "Chalmers is only 17 years of age, but, although young in years, he is the brains of Waverley's attack. It should not be long before he is showing his paces with a senior club."

Manager Billy Birrell signed Chalmers for Division Two club Raith Rovers later that year. Birrell's successor, Jimmy Logan, praised Chalmers' performances for the A team during the 1931–32 season, and gave him a debut in the senior eleven, but at the end of the campaign Logan gave him a free transfer. Chalmers applied for reinstatement as a junior, and was expected to join Fife League champions Rosslyn Juniors, but instead he again signed for Birrell, this time at English Third Division South club Bournemouth & Boscombe Athletic.

Chalmers made his Football League debut on 17 December 1932 away to Gillingham, and played in the last three matches of that season. He scored once, the only goal of the reverse fixture against Gillingham, with a "shot which hit the crossbar and bounced down over the line." He returned to the first team in November 1933 and was a regular at inside left for the rest of the season. A splintered bone in his leg kept him out for some weeks in the middle of the 1935–36 season and meant he missed the FA Cup third-round visit to Bradford City, which Bournemouth lost 1–0. After a 1936–37 season in which he rarely missed a match, he lost his place through injury in December 1937 and rarely appeared again, William O'Brien being preferred at inside left. He made 153 appearances and scored 17 goals in league competition, 25 goals from 171 matches in all senior competitions.

Chalmers spent the 1938–39 season with Barrow of the Third Division North. He was used as much at outside left, the position he had played as a youngster in Scotland, as at inside left, played 36 league matches, scored twice, and helped Barrow improve from a position of needing to apply for re-election to the League in 1938 to a mid-table finish. He played in the first three matches of the 1939–40 season, and converted a penalty in a 2–2 draw with Bradford City in the third of those, before competitive football was abandoned when war was declared.

== Personal life ==
Chalmers was born in 1912 in Kirkcaldy, the only son of Henry Ritchie Chalmers and his wife Davina Birrell. He served an apprenticeship as a joiner, and worked in that trade both before and alongside his football career.

He joined the Army in 1942 and served as a gunner with the 512th (East Riding) Coast Regiment, Royal Artillery. While stationed in the Grimsby area in October 1943, he died in unclear circumstances. He had made cocoa for the night watch before being taken ill; an ambulance was called in the early hours, but he died on the way to hospital. A post mortem attributed death to an irritant poison, believed to have been phosphorus, which was used in the officers' mess to kill beetles but to which Chalmers had no access. Giving evidence at the inquest, Chalmers' captain described him as a good soldier of temperate habits and a good athlete; his sergeant said that everyone had drunk the cocoa and none had become unwell. An open verdict was returned. Chalmers was buried in Dysart Cemetery, Kirkcaldy.

== Career statistics ==
Appearances and goals by club, season and competition
| Club | Season | League | | | FA Cup | | Other | | Total | |
| Club | Season | Division | Apps | Goals | Apps | Goals | Apps | Goals | Apps | Goals |
|---|---|---|---|---|---|---|---|---|---|---|
| Bournemouth & Boscombe Athletic | 1932–33 | Third Division South | 4 | 1 | 0 | 0 | — | | 4 | 1 |
| Bournemouth & Boscombe Athletic | 1933–34 | Third Division South | 26 | 3 | 2 | 0 | 2 (Note: Appearance(s) in Third Division South Cup) | 1 | 30 | 4 |
| Bournemouth & Boscombe Athletic | 1934–35 | Third Division South | 31 | 3 | 0 | 0 | 1 | 1 | 32 | 4 |
| Bournemouth & Boscombe Athletic | 1935–36 | Third Division South | 31 | 5 | 3 | 3 | 4 | 1 | 38 | 9 |
| Bournemouth & Boscombe Athletic | 1936–37 | Third Division South | 42 | 4 | 3 | 0 | 1 | 0 | 46 | 4 |
| Bournemouth & Boscombe Athletic | 1937–38 | Third Division South | 19 | 1 | 2 | 2 | 0 | 0 | 21 | 3 |
| Bournemouth & Boscombe Athletic | Total | | 153 | 17 | 10 | 5 | 8 | 3 | 171 | 25 |
| Barrow | 1938–39 | Third Division North | 36 | 2 | 1 | 0 | 1 (Note: Appearance in Third Division North Cup) | 0 | 38 | 2 |
| Career total | | | 189 | 19 | 11 | 5 | 9 | 3 | 209 | 27 |
