= Ian Cunningham (disambiguation) =

Ian Cunningham may refer to:

- Ian Cunningham (footballer) (born 1956), Scottish footballer, see List of AFC Bournemouth players
- Ian Cunningham (born 1985), American football player
