= Richard Hill (footballer, born 1963) =

English footballer and manager

Personal information
- Full name: Richard Wilfred Hill
- Date of birth: 20 September 1963 (age 63)
- Place of birth: Hinckley, England
- Height: 6 ft 0 in (1.83 m)
- Position: Midfielder

Senior career*
Years	Team	Apps	(Gls)
	Leicester City	0	(0)
1982–1985	Nuneaton Borough		
1983	Christchurch United		
1985–1987	Northampton Town	86	(46)
1987	Watford	4	(0)
1987–1990	Oxford United	63	(17)
1990-1992	Kettering Town		

Managerial career
- 1998–2000: Stevenage Borough
- 2012–2015: Eastleigh
- 2016: Whitehawk
- 2017: Eastleigh
- 2023–2024: Eastleigh
- 2026: Eastleigh
- * Club domestic league appearances and goals

Richard Wilfred Hill (born 20 September 1963) is an English football coach and manager who is most recently was the manager of Eastleigh, He is also a former footballer who played for Oxford United, Watford, Northampton Town and Leicester City. He has been assistant manager at six clubs, including Queens Park Rangers, and had a difficult but successful stint as manager of Stevenage Borough before taking Eastleigh into the Conference for the first time in their history.

== Playing career ==
During his playing days Hill played for Nuneaton Borough, Christchurch United in New Zealand, Northampton Town, Watford and Oxford United. In his time at Northampton, Hill scored 33 league and cup goals in one season, winning the golden boot for finishing as the club's top goal scorer.

Hill was transferred from Northampton Town to Watford for a Fourth Division record fee of £258,000. He was the last signing made by Graham Taylor before his departure from Watford to manage Aston Villa at the end of the 1986–87 season. He did not feature in the plans of incoming manager Dave Bassett and consequently, his stay at Vicarage Road was brief only appearing 4 times: he was transferred to Oxford United for £260,000.

Hill had to finish his playing career early due to a serious knee injury, but having amassed 69 goals from just 171 Football League games.

== Managerial career ==
Since retiring from playing Hill has been assistant manager to John Gregory at both Wycombe Wanderers and Queens Park Rangers, Brian Little at Aston Villa, Martin Wilkinson at Northampton Town, Andy Hessenthaler at Gillingham, Tranmere Rovers and was first-team coach at Reading. He has also coached at Swindon Town, scouted for Derby County and managed Stevenage Borough.

In June 2010, Hill was appointed technical advisor to the Ethiopia national football team and worked with them during African Nations qualifying games.

In June 2011, Hill was appointed assistant manager to FC Kairat in the Kazakhstan Premier League.

On 12 September 2012, Hill was appointed manager of Conference South club Eastleigh. In his first season, he led Eastleigh to the Conference South Play Off Semi Finals. At the start of the 2013–14 season Eastleigh were big favourites to win the league. Under Hill's guidance he led Eastleigh to the Conference South title and promotion in the 2013–14 season. The 2014–15 season saw Eastleigh in the Conference Premier, the highest level of football the club had ever competed at, with Hill taking Eastleigh to the Play Off Semi Finals at the end of that season. During his initial spell as manager of Eastleigh, Hill achieved a win ratio of 62%.

Hill resigned at Eastleigh on 23 September 2015 after just over 3 years in the job, following a run of five games without a win, culminating in a 5–2 defeat to Dover Athletic. Leaving the club, Hill said it felt like a break-up, and it was time for a change for both himself and the club.

On 9 September 2016, Hill returned to management, replacing Pablo Asensio as boss of National League South club Whitehawk.

On 29 November 2016 Hill left Whitehawk and joined Aston Villa to be part of Steve Bruce's recruitment staff. Following the departure of Martin Allen as manager at Eastleigh, after a run of seven games without a win, Hill returned to The Spitfires as Director of Football and caretaker manager on 23 February 2017.

Between May 2018 and July 2020, Hill held the position of Head of Football Operations at Sunderland. He came under criticism from supporters of the club on account of what was perceived as poor transfer business, however received support from owner Stewart Donald whom Hill had previously worked with at Eastleigh.

In March 2023, Hill once again returned to Eastleigh in the role of Club Director. Following the departure of Lee Bradbury in August 2023, he was once again placed in temporary charge of the first-team. On 28 September, he was given the job on a permanent basis. He was sacked on 17 February 2024.

On 24 February 2026, Hill was appointed manager of Eastleigh for a fourth spell on an interim basis until the end of the season.

== Career statistics ==
=== Club ===
Appearances and goals by club, season and competition
Club	Season	League			FA Cup		League Cup		Other		Total	
Club	Season	Division	Apps	Goals	Apps	Goals	Apps	Goals	Apps	Goals	Apps	Goals
Northampton Town	1985–86	Fourth Division	41	17	1	0	4	0	3 (Note: Appearances in Associate Members' Cup)	2	49	19
Northampton Town	1986–87	Fourth Division	45	29	4	3	2	0	3	1	54	33
Northampton Town	Total		86	46	5	3	6	0	6	3	103	52
Watford	1987–88	First Division	4	0	0	0	0	0	0	0	4	0
Oxford United	1987–88	First Division	24	3	0	0	0	0	0	0	24	3
Oxford United	1988–89	Second Division	0	0	3	3	0	0	0	0	3	3
Oxford United	1989–90	Second Division	0	0	0	0	0	0	0	0	0	0
Oxford United	Total		24	3	3	3	0	0	0	0	63	17
Career total			114	49	8	6	6	0	6	3	170	69

== Honours ==
Northampton Town

- Football League Fourth Division: 1986–87

Individual

- PFA Team of the Year: 1986–87 Fourth Division
