= Steven Murray (footballer) =

Scottish footballer

Personal information
- Full name: Steven Murray
- Date of birth: 1 December 1967 (age 58)
- Place of birth: Kilmarnock, East Ayrshire, Scotland
- Height: 5 ft 7 in (1.70 m)
- Position: Midfielder

Youth career
- –1985: Nottingham Forest

Senior career*
Years	Team	Apps	(Gls)
1985–1987	Nottingham Forest	0	(0)
1986	→ York City (loan)	3	(0)
1987–1988	Celtic	0	(0)
Total		3	(0)

International career
- Scotland U19
- * Club domestic league appearances and goals

Steven Murray (born 1 December 1967) is a Scottish former professional footballer who played as a midfielder in the Football League for York City, and was on the books of Nottingham Forest and Celtic without making a league appearance. He was capped by the Scotland national under-19 team. His career was ended following a severe leg injury received playing for Celtic reserves and subsequently he received a six figure court settlement.
