= John Hannah (footballer) =

English footballer

Personal information
- Date of birth: 25 October 1962 (age 64)
- Place of birth: Wakefield, England
- Position: Forward

Youth career
- Newcastle United

Senior career*
Years	Team	Apps	(Gls)
- Fryston Colliery Welfare
1983–1984	Darlington	22	(7)
- Scarborough
- * Club domestic league appearances and goals

John Hannah (born 25 October 1962) is an English former footballer who played in the Football League as a forward for Darlington. He also played non-league football for Fryston Colliery Welfare and Scarborough. Hannah, who had been working as an electrician at Kellingley Colliery, joined Darlington on a non-contract basis, and played for them during the 1984 miners' strike.
