= Salisbury City F.C. =

Coordinates: 51°06′15.62″N 1°47′08.73″W

- Full name: Salisbury City Football Club
- Nickname: The Whites
- Founded: 1947 (as Salisbury)
- Dissolved: 2014; 12 years ago
- Ground: Raymond McEnhill Stadium
- Capacity: 5,000 (500 seated)
Home colours	Away colours

Salisbury City Football Club was an English football club based in Salisbury, Wiltshire. They were formed in 1947 and played at Victoria Park until 1997, and then at the Raymond McEnhill Stadium. Salisbury had gained back-to-back promotions in recent years, first to the Conference South in the 2005–06 season by finishing top of the Southern League Premier Division, followed by winning the play-off final in the 2006–07 season to participate in the Conference Premier in 2007–08. They played the 2010–11 season in the Southern League Premier Division after being demoted from the Conference Premier at the end of the 2009–10 season, but won promotion to the Conference South for the 2011–12 season in the first season following their relegation. The club spent two seasons in the Conference South before winning promotion to the Conference Premier via the play-offs in the 2012–13 season. In 2014, the club were removed from the Football Conference after failing to pay debts. The club reformed as Salisbury F.C. for the 2015–16 season.

== History ==
The club was founded as Salisbury F.C. in 1947. A previous Salisbury City Football Club existed during the early 20th century, and played in the Southern League Second Division between 1906 and 1911, and the Western League in the 1930s, but the later club did not consider itself to be related.

=== Western League years (1947-68) ===
After its formation, Salisbury immediately entered the Western League and won the Second Division title at the very first attempt. An attendance of 8,902, a figure never beaten, saw the championship decider, a 1–1 draw against Weymouth.

In late 1952, the previously amateur club decided to turn semi-professional, enabling the players to be paid, but bringing to an end the club's participation in the FA Amateur Cup. The 1955/56 season saw Salisbury reaching the First Round Proper of the FA Cup for the first time, where they lost 3-2 away to old rivals Weymouth, who were now in the Southern League. In 1957/58, the club won the Western League for the first time, an achievement which was repeated in 1960/61. In between those title winning seasons, the club had its best ever run in the FA Cup, reaching the second round in the 1959/60 season. After beating the reigning Athenian League champions Barnet in the first round, Salisbury were beaten 1-0 at home by Newport County, the first time they had played a Football League side in a competitive match. In the 1964/65 season, the club again reached the first round, losing 5-1 at Third Division Peterborough United.

Floodlights were installed at Victoria Park at the start of the 1966/67 season. Salisbury once again reached the first round of the FA Cup in the 1967/68 season, losing 4-0 away at Third Division Swindon Town.

Following 21 seasons in the Western League, Salisbury were accepted into the Southern League for the 1968/69 season.

=== Southern League ===
In 1968 the club was elected to the Southern Football League but met with little success until the 1985–86 season when Salisbury finished as runners up to Cambridge City and were promoted to the Premier Division, albeit only for a single season.

In 1993 the club's name was officially changed to Salisbury City, and in 1994–95 they won the Southern League Southern Division championship. After redevelopment work at the council-owned Victoria Park, the club was able to step up to the Premier Division, a promotion which had been denied them two years earlier due to ground gradings.

Salisbury lasted seven seasons in the Premier Division, but troubles off the field eventually led to the departure of manager Geoff Butler, who had been in the role for more than 17 seasons. Relegation followed and the club came close to being wound up before being saved by a consortium led by one of the club's sponsors, Neville Beal, who was also able to tempt former Southampton player Nick Holmes, at the time living in the US, to take over as manager in 2002. In the 2003–04 season, Salisbury gained promotion from the Southern League Eastern Division by finishing sixth, but a re-organisation of the English football league system saw them placed in the Isthmian League Premier Division, although after one season they were switched back to the Southern League Premier Division, which they won at the first attempt to gain a place in the Conference South.

=== Conference Leagues ===
On 13 May 2007, Salisbury City defeated Braintree Town 1–0 in the Conference South promotion play-off final, earning a promotion spot to the Conference Premier.

As well as winning promotion, 2006–07 saw Salisbury embark on one of their most successful FA Cup runs, reaching the 2nd Round for only the second time in the club's history, where they were drawn against Nottingham Forest. In front of a record attendance at The Raymond McEnhill Stadium of 3,100, Salisbury held Forest to a 1–1 draw live on BBC One. The replay at the City Ground saw Forest progress into the 3rd round with a 2–0 victory, which was broadcast live on Sky.

Salisbury's first season in the Conference Premier saw them finish a credible twelfth after a run of several wins in the second half of the season. This success continued into the 2008–09 season when they hit top spot in early September. However, this run soon came to an end when they suffered many injuries which saw their form slip. Then an appeal to raise £100,000 in two weeks was asked of the fans and the city, but only £33,000 was raised. This was insufficient to keep the club going with the squad they had, which led to cuts: in October 2008 many of Salisbury City's top players went on loan in order for the club to cut costs. In April 2009 the club was put up for sale for £1 in a bid to attract new investors to help the club survive. However, the future of the club remained unclear after it was announced that the club had been unable to find a buyer willing to assume the financial liabilities and debt. On 3 September 2009 Salisbury entered administration clearing debts of £200,000.

=== Administration ===
In the summer of 2009, Salisbury City Football Club faced bankruptcy and in early September the club was formally placed in administration. Whilst still functioning as a football team, The Whites were fined and were punished further by the football authorities with the deduction of points. From September 2009, Salisbury City FC was being run by Carl Faulds and Michael Fortune operating as agents and contracting for Portland Business and Financial Solutions.

On 19 May 2010 the club was demoted two divisions to the Southern League Premier Division due to a breach of Conference rules. The club admitted that contrary to the conditions agreed in order to come out of administration, it had missed the deadline to pay back a creditor, but hoped to reach a CVA on 12 June, 5 weeks after the deadline. An appeal was made but on 10 June 2010 it was announced that with the appeal having failed, Salisbury City FC would compete in the Southern League Premier Division for the coming 2010–11 season, two divisions below Conference Premier level.

=== A new board ===
A consortium of William Harrison-Allan, Chris Brammall and Jeff Hooper took the club on and bailed them out of administration. What followed was a complete restructure with manager Tommy Widdrington going to Southend United as assistant manager in the summer of 2010. Long-serving Nick Holmes followed him out the door, which left Darrell Clarke and Mikey Harris in temporary charge of a depleted squad in the lead up to the season. They assembled a squad of youngsters over pre-season to go with the players that remained at the club. Striker Matt Tubbs also left that summer to join Crawley Town for a club record fee, thought to be around £70,000.

=== 2010–11 season ===
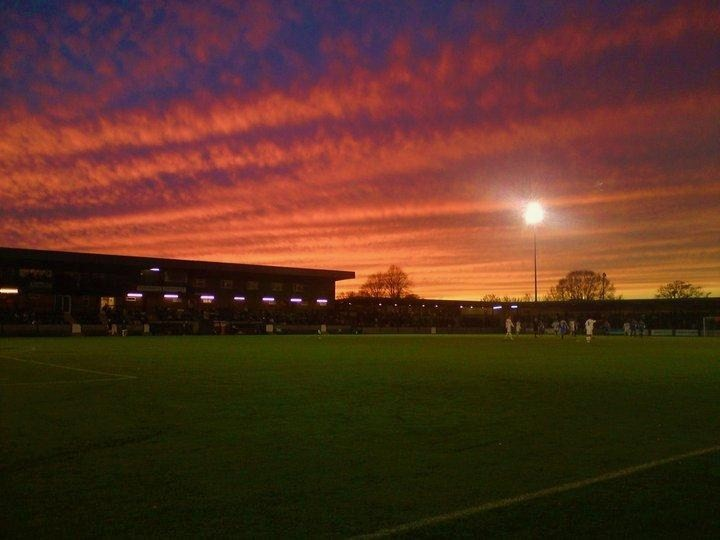
The Raymond McEnhill Stadium.

Darrell Clarke was given the job permanently on 4 August and Mikey Harris was made his assistant in time for the new season. Despite having a new manager and many new faces, Salisbury had a good start to the 2010–11 season and were unbeaten at home in the league until they lost to title rivals Truro City 6–0 in February 2011. Salisbury progressed to the 4th qualifying round of the FA Cup, eventually losing to Corby Town and on 15 January 2011, they battled to a 1–0 victory over Wrexham in the 2nd Round of the FA Trophy, a team who were two leagues above them. They then overcame Woking 2–0 away, a team who were a league above The Whites, to reach the Quarter Final stage of the competition. They fell at this stage, losing 2–1 to Darlington at the Northern Echo Arena, after another good performance. However, injuries hampered the Salisbury side in the latter stages of the season, and many players were brought in on loan. The team were far less consistent than they had been at the start of the year, and the starting line up was changed often because of the injuries to the squad, and many players seemed unfit when they did play. Truro overtook The Whites at the end of the season, meaning Salisbury had to settle for a play-off place.

Salisbury played Cambridge City at home in the play-off semi-final and won 1–0. This resulted in a trip to Hednesford for the play-off final, and after a gripping game that finished 2–2 after extra time due to a late equaliser from Ben Adelsbury, Salisbury won 3–2 on penalties, clinching promotion back to the Conference South.

=== 2011–12 season ===
Many players signed new 1-year contracts at the start of the new season, as did manager Darrell Clarke and his assistant Mikey Harris. After a relatively poor pre-season, The Whites made a good start to the Conference South season. The Whites also enjoyed a good FA Cup run, beating Swindon Supermarine, Poole Town and Bishop's Stortford on their way to the first round proper, where they beat Arlesey Town 3–1 to make the 2nd round for only the third time in their history. They were first out the hat and drawn at home against Grimsby Town in the next round. A crowd of 2,161 were at the Ray Mac Stadium to witness The Whites hold Grimsby to a 0–0 draw meaning they would replay at Blundell Park on 13 December. In the replay Salisbury earned a surprise 3–2 victory in extra time and competed in the 3rd round proper of the FA Cup for the first time in the club's history. They drew League One Sheffield United away in the 3rd round, but lost the game 3–1 at Bramall Lane.

Salisbury also made good progress in the FA Trophy, a competition in which they'd had success over the past few seasons. They disposed of fellow Conference South side Weston Super-Mare 2–0 at the Ray Mac before comfortably beating Lowestoft Town 4–1 at home. They exited the Trophy suffering a 6–2 home defeat at the hands of Conference Premier outfit York City.

While success in the cups had been considerable, The Whites' league form suffered for it, with many inconsistent results, as well as poor performances, seeing Salisbury slip down the table into a relegation battle, despite a promising start. Despite this, The Whites did manage to secure a surprise 2–0 win at home to runaway league leaders Woking, which signaled a turn around in their fortunes.

Salisbury's ongoing financial problems were also improved upon during the season, thanks firstly to their long run in the FA Cup, which saw them pocket around £100,000, as well as the sale of former striker Matt Tubbs from Crawley Town to AFC Bournemouth for a fee believed to be around £800,000, which saw The Whites receive a fee worth around 15%, due to a sell-on clause.

Despite some poor results at home in the second half of the season, Salisbury's away form was strong. After securing their status in the Conference South for the following season, The Whites ended the campaign very strongly with wins against Chelmsford City (3–2), Hampton and Richmond Borough (2–1), Sutton United (3–1) and Eastbourne Borough (3–1). These strong results secured a top 10 finish for the club, which, coupled with the strong FA Cup run, meant that it was a largely successful season for Salisbury City.

=== 2012–13 season ===
Salisbury made a host of new signings ahead of the 2012-13 campaign in an effort to push for promotion. Goalkeeper Mark Scott rejoined on a permanent deal from Swindon Town, highly rated midfielder Chris McPhee joined from Torquay United, and striker Jamie White joined the club from neighbours Winchester City. White hit the ground running, topping the Conference goalscoring charts, with 26 league goals from 41 appearances. Salisbury City finished their Conference South campaign in second position, and would participate in the play-offs for a chance to win promotion to the Conference Premier.

In the Semi Final, they faced Chelmsford City, beating The Clarets 2–1 on aggregate, after a hotly contested 2 legged tie. This victory earned them a place in the Blue Square Bet South play off final against Dover Athletic. On the 12th May 2013, Salisbury won the play off final 3–2 after extra time at the Raymond McEnhill Stadium. The home side were 1–0 up approaching the 90th minute, thanks to a Ricky Wellard goal, before Dover equalised. Salisbury gained a 3–1 extra time advantage through Stuart Sinclair and Jamie White, and despite a 118th-minute goal by Dover's Billy Bricknell, Salisbury City won, to gain promotion to the Conference Premier for the 2013–14 season, in front of 3,408 spectators.

=== 2013–14 season ===
During the close season, manager Darrell Clarke left the club to join Bristol Rovers as their new assistant manager.

On 4 July 2013, Salisbury City announced that Mikey Harris had been appointed manager on a permanent basis and would become English football's youngest full-time manager at 28 years of age. Former Northern Ireland international Warren Feeney was later made Harris's right-hand man after joining as a player-assistant manager for the upcoming season. The first 3 games of the season were all losses, but after this, Salisbury went on an 8-game unbeaten streak, with 6 wins and 2 draws after the first 11 games of the season.

On 12 December 2013, the club confirmed they had exited administration after five years of financial trouble.

The club finished their 2013–14 campaign in a comfortable 12th position. However, the club were demoted to the Conference South on 13 June 2014 after missing a Conference deadline to clear outstanding debts, and then expelled on 4 July despite minority owner Mark Winter offering £91,000 to safeguard the club's future.

== Seasons ==
See List of Salisbury City F.C. seasons.

== Ground ==
For the first 50 years of its existence, the club played at Victoria Park (although in the first few years, some games were played at the Stratford Road ground which is now used by Salisbury Rugby Club). In 1997 Salisbury City moved to a purpose-built stadium at Old Sarum, named after the then chairman. The Raymond McEnhill Stadium's capacity officially stands at 4,000 (although it is technically able to hold 5,000), with covered accommodation for 2,247 fans.

A then record crowd of 2,570 saw the FA Cup first round 2–0 defeat by Hull City in 1998. This figure was beaten twice during the FA Cup run of 2006–07: against Fleetwood Town in the first round proper and then against Nottingham Forest in the second round, with 3,100 attending the 1–1 draw. Salisbury City lost the replay.

The record league attendance figure of 2,677 was set on 28 December 2009 when Salisbury City played Oxford United, drawing 1–1.

A new record was set in the 2012–13 season when Salisbury reached the Conference South play-off final against Dover Athletic, the final being played on home turf. 3,408 attended the match which Salisbury won 3–2 after extra time.

== Former players ==
1. Players that have played/managed in the football league or any foreign equivalent to this level (i.e. fully professional league).
2. Players with full international caps.
3. Players that hold a club record or have captained the club.

- (England) Charles Ademeno (2008-09, 2012-13)
- (England) James Bittner (2007-10, 2013-14)
- (England) Robbie Carroll (1994-96)
- (England) Darrell Clarke (2007-13)
- (England) Ryan Clarke (2006-09)
- (England) Sean Clohessy (2008-10)
- (England) Liam Feeney (2007-09)
- (Northern Ireland) Warren Feeney (2013-14)
- (England) Elliott Frear (2013-14)
- (England) Harry Penk (1960s)
- (England) Brian Mundee (1987-88, 1992-93)
- (England) Denny Mundee (1987-88, 1997)
- (England) Cliff Myers (1970s)
- (France) Djoumin Sangaré (2008-09)
- (England) Rob Sinclair (2008-10, 2013-14)
- (England) Stuart Sinclair (2012-14)
- (England) Tim Soutar (1960s)
- (England) Ian Thompson (1981-83, 1986-88)
- (England) Matt Tubbs (2003-10)
- (England) Daniel Webb (2008-12)

See also *Salisbury City F.C. players

== Records ==
=== Salisbury FC ===
- Best FA Cup performance: Second round, 1959–60
- Best FA Trophy performance: First round, 1985–86, 1990–91, 1991–92

=== Salisbury City FC ===
- Best FA Cup performance: Second round, 2006–07 (replay), 2013–14
- Best FA Trophy performance: Semi-finals, 2009–10

== Club Honours ==
- Football Conference
  - Conference South Play-Off Winners: 2006–07, 2012–13
- Southern Football League
  - Champions: 2005–06
  - Play-Off Winners: 2010–11
  - Southern Division Champions: 1994–95
- Western Football League
  - Champions: 1957–58, 1960–61
  - Division 2 Champions: 1947–48
  - Western League Cup Winners: 1955–56
  - Alan Young Cup Winners: 1959–60, 1960–61, 1962–63
- Wiltshire Premier Shield
  - Winners: 1956–57, 1959–60, 1960–61, 1961–62,1966–67, 1967–68, 1970–71, 1977–78, 1978–79, 1995–96, 1998–99, 2000–01, 2002–03, 2007–08, 2008–09
- Hampshire Senior Cup
  - Winners: 1961–1962, 1963–1964

== Successor Club ==
- See Salisbury.
