= Paul Sugrue =

English footballer and manager

Personal information
- Full name: Paul Anthony Sugrue
- Date of birth: 6 November 1960 (age 65)
- Place of birth: Coventry, England
- Height: 5 ft 7 in (1.70 m)
- Position: Forward

Senior career*
Years	Team	Apps	(Gls)
197x–1980	Nuneaton Borough		
1980–1981	Manchester City	20	(0)
1981–1982	Cardiff City	5	(0)
1982–1985	Middlesbrough	89	(6)
1984–1986	Portsmouth	4	(0)
1985–1986	Northampton Town	8	(2)
1986–1987	Newport County	2	(0)
- Bridgend Town
1988–1989	Elo Kuopio	29	(7)
1990–1991	Barnet	1	(0)

Managerial career
- Nuneaton Borough
- 2006–2007: Merthyr Tydfil
- * Club domestic league appearances and goals

Paul Anthony Sugrue (born 6 November 1960) is an English former professional footballer who played as a forward in the Football League for Manchester City, Cardiff City, Middlesbrough, Portsmouth, Northampton Town and Newport County.

Sugrue played non-league football for Nuneaton Borough before a long career in the Football League. He then returned to non-league with Bridgend Town and played for Elo Kuopio in Finland, before returning to England to play a pivotal role in Barnet's 1991 Conference title-winning campaign. He had a spell as manager at Nuneaton Borough, and later became vice-chairman of Merthyr Tydfil, taking over managerial duties as well in February 2006.

== Personal life ==
In late 2017 Sugrue appeared in court on fraud charges, alongside fellow former footballer Mark Aizlewood and others. He was found guilty in February 2018 and sentenced to seven years imprisonment.
