= Billy Jeffrey =

Scottish footballer, manager and scout

Personal information
- Full name: William Jeffrey
- Date of birth: 25 October 1956 (age 70)
- Place of birth: Helensburgh, Scotland
- Position: Midfielder

Team information
- Current team: Newcastle United (scout)

Senior career*
Years	Team	Apps	(Gls)
1973–1982	Oxford United	314	(24)
1982–1983	Blackpool	14	(1)
1983–1984	Northampton Town	54	(5)
1984	Kettering Town		

Managerial career
- Irthlingborough Diamonds
- 1998–2005: Stamford
- 2005–2007: Rugby Town
- 2009–2011: Banbury United
- * Club domestic league appearances and goals

William Jeffrey (born 25 October 1956) is a Scottish former professional footballer, football manager and scout who works for Premier League club Newcastle United.

A midfielder, he spent most of his playing career with Oxford United, making 356 appearances in all competitions for the club. He later managed several clubs in English non-League football, including Stamford, Rugby Town and Banbury United, before moving into scouting.

== Playing career ==
=== Oxford United ===
Jeffrey began his professional career with Oxford United. He made his first-team debut against Fulham on 26 January 1973, aged 16 years and 336 days, making him one of the youngest players to represent the club.

Jeffrey went on to spend nine years with Oxford. He made 314 league appearances and scored 24 league goals, while his record in all competitions was 356 appearances and 26 goals. He also served as club captain during his time at the Manor Ground.

=== Blackpool ===
Jeffrey joined Blackpool in 1982. He made his league debut for the club on 2 October in a 2–0 home victory over Darlington. He made 14 league appearances during the 1982–83 season and scored once, against Hartlepool United on New Year's Day 1983.

He also appeared in both of Blackpool's FA Cup matches that season, coming on as a substitute against Horwich RMI in the first round before starting against Preston North End in the second round.

=== Northampton Town and Kettering Town ===
Jeffrey left Blackpool in 1983 and joined Northampton Town. He made 54 league appearances for Northampton and scored five goals during the 1983–84 season.

He subsequently joined non-League club Kettering Town in 1984 before ending his playing career.

== Managerial career ==
=== Early career and Stamford ===
After retiring from professional football, Jeffrey moved into coaching and non-League management. He managed Irthlingborough Diamonds and later worked as assistant manager at Rushden & Diamonds.

In 1998, Jeffrey was appointed manager of Stamford, succeeding Steve Evans, who had left to join Boston United. Jeffrey arrived from Rushden & Diamonds and rebuilt the Stamford squad with younger players. In his first season, the club finished 18th in the Southern League Midland Division.

The following season began with an eleven-match unbeaten run, at the time a club record, and Stamford eventually finished 17th in the Southern League Eastern Division.

Jeffrey remained in charge as Stamford improved during the following seasons. A seventh-place finish in 2003–04 was sufficient for the club to gain a place in the newly reorganised Southern League Premier Division, the first time Stamford had reached that level. The club was relegated the following season, and Jeffrey left in 2005.

=== Rugby Town ===
Jeffrey subsequently became manager of Rugby Town in 2005. He remained in charge for two seasons, leaving the club in 2007.

=== Banbury United ===
In 2009, Jeffrey was appointed manager of Southern League Premier Division club Banbury United. He managed the club during the 2009–10 and 2010–11 seasons.

Jeffrey's coaching staff at Banbury included Matt Haycocks, who later recalled working under Jeffrey during his time with the club.

Jeffrey left Banbury in 2011.

== Scouting career ==
=== Newcastle United ===
In September 2013, Jeffrey joined Premier League club Newcastle United as a scout.
