= Mick Perry =

English footballer

Personal information
- Full name: Michael Alexander Perry
- Date of birth: 4 April 1964 (age 62)
- Place of birth: Wimbledon, London, England
- Position: Forward

Senior career*
| Years | Team | Apps | (Gls) |
| 1982–1984 | West Bromwich Albion | 20 | (5) |
| 1984 | → Torquay United (loan) | 5 | (1) |
| 1984 | → Northampton Town (loan) | 4 | (0) |
| 1984–1985 | Torquay United | 18 | (1) |
| 1985–1986 | Port Vale (trial) | 0 | (0) |
- Stafford Rangers
| Total | | 47+ | (7+) |
- * Club domestic league appearances and goals

Michael Alexander Perry (born 4 April 1964) is an English former footballer who scored seven goals in 47 league games in a four-year career in the Football League from 1982 to 1984. A forward, he played for West Bromwich Albion, Torquay United, Northampton Town, Port Vale, and Stafford Rangers.

== Career ==
Perry began his career at Ron Wylie's West Bromwich Albion, who posted an 11th-place finish in the First Division in 1982–83, before dropping to 17th place in 1983–84. Perry scored five goals in 20 league games at The Hawthorns. He also had loan spells at Fourth Division clubs Torquay United and Northampton Town, making five appearances at Plainmoor and four appearances at Sixfields. He joined Torquay permanently and scored one goal in 18 league games in the 1984–85 campaign, as David Webb's "Gulls" finished bottom of the Football League. He had a trial with John Rudge's Fourth Division Port Vale in October 1985, making an appearance as a substitute in a Football League Trophy first round match against Wrexham at the Racecourse Ground on 21 January 1986, which finished 1–1. He left Vale Park the following month, and, after an unsuccessful trial with Nottingham Forest, joined non-League Stafford Rangers.

== Career statistics ==
Appearances and goals by club, season and competition
| Club | Season | League | | | FA Cup | | Other | | Total | |
| Club | Season | Division | Apps | Goals | Apps | Goals | Apps | Goals | Apps | Goals |
|---|---|---|---|---|---|---|---|---|---|---|
| West Bromwich Albion | 1982–83 | First Division | 7 | 1 | 0 | 0 | 0 | 0 | 7 | 1 |
| West Bromwich Albion | 1983–84 | First Division | 13 | 4 | 1 | 0 | 2 | 0 | 16 | 4 |
| West Bromwich Albion | Total | | 20 | 5 | 1 | 0 | 2 | 0 | 23 | 5 |
| Northampton Town (loan) | 1984–85 | Fourth Division | 4 | 0 | 0 | 0 | 0 | 0 | 4 | 0 |
| Torquay United | 1984–85 | Fourth Division | 20 | 2 | 0 | 0 | 0 | 0 | 20 | 2 |
| Torquay United | 1985–86 | Fourth Division | 3 | 0 | 0 | 0 | 1 | 0 | 4 | 0 |
| Torquay United | Total | | 23 | 2 | 0 | 0 | 1 | 0 | 24 | 2 |
| Port Vale | 1985–86 | Fourth Division | 0 | 0 | 0 | 0 | 1 | 0 | 1 | 0 |
| Career total | | | 47 | 7 | 1 | 0 | 4 | 0 | 52 | 7 |
