= Mark Schiavi =

English footballer

Personal information
- Date of birth: 1 May 1964 (age 62)
- Place of birth: London, England
- Positions: Left midfielder; striker

Youth career
- West Ham United

Senior career*
Years	Team	Apps	(Gls)
1980–1984	West Ham United	0	(0)
1983v1984	→ Bournemouth (loan)	10	(0)
1984–1985	Bournemouth	19	(0)
1985–1986	Northampton Town	35	(5)
1986–1987	Cambridge United	30	(2)
1987–1987	→ Barnet (loan)	3	(0)
1987–1988	Kettering Town	?	(0)
1988–1989	Enfield	?	(6)
1989–1991	Irthlingborough Diamonds	?	(?)
1991–1993	Bourne Town	?	(?)

International career
1980–1981	England Youth	7	(3)
- * Club domestic league appearances and goals as of 16:01 5 December 2011

Mark Schiavi (born 1 May 1964) is an English former footballer who played as a left midfielder for Bournemouth, Northampton Town and Cambridge United in the English Football League.

== Football career ==
=== Club career ===
Schiavi started with West Ham United as an apprentice in their youth squad and was a member of the team which won the 1981 Youth Cup before moving on loan to Bournemouth in 1983. Without making a first team appearance for West Ham this loan was made permanent in 1984. Schiavi also played for Northampton Town, Cambridge United and Kettering Town.

For season 2010-11 he took up a coaching role with Boston Town until he left the club in June 2011.
