= Paul Friar =

Scottish footballer

Personal information
- Full name: John Paul Friar
- Date of birth: 6 June 1963 (age 63)
- Place of birth: Glasgow, Scotland
- Height: 5 ft 6 in (1.68 m)
- Position: Left back

Senior career*
Years	Team	Apps	(Gls)
1980–1983	Leicester City	58	(0)
1983–1984	Rotherham United	20	(0)
1983–1984	→ Motherwell (loan)	2	(0)
1984–1986	Charlton Athletic	36	(0)
1985–1986	→ Northampton Town (loan)	14	(0)
1986–1987	Aldershot	29	(1)
1987–1988	Welling United		
1988–1989	Dartford		
1989–1990	Enfield		
1990–1991	Fisher Athletic		
1991–1992	Partick Thistle	1	(0)
1992–1993	East Stirlingshire	42	(6)
1993–1996	Albion Rovers	6	(0)
1996–1997	Fauldhouse United		
Total		208	(7)
- * Club domestic league appearances and goals

John Paul Friar (born 6 June 1963) is a Scottish footballer who played as a left back in the English and Scottish Leagues.

== Honours ==
Aldershot

- Football League Fourth Division play-offs: 1987
