= Paul Shirtliff =

English footballer (1962–2009)

Personal information
- Full name: Paul Robert Shirtliff
- Date of birth: 3 November 1962
- Place of birth: Hoyland, Barnsley, England
- Date of death: 13 September 2009 (aged 46)
- Place of death: Barnsley, England
- Position: Defender

Senior career*
Years	Team	Apps	(Gls)
1980–1984	Sheffield Wednesday	9	(0)
1984–1985	Northampton Town	29	(0)
1985–1988	Frickley Athletic		
1988–1992	Boston United	153	(1)
1992–1993	Dagenham & Redbridge	33	(0)
1993–1994	Gateshead	15	(0)

International career
1986–1993	England C	15	(0)
- * Club domestic league appearances and goals

Paul Robert Shirtliff (3 November 1962 – 13 September 2009) was an English footballer who played as a defender in The Football League for Sheffield Wednesday and Northampton Town, but spent the majority of his career in non-league football. He was the younger brother of former Sheffield Wednesday defender Peter Shirtliff.

== Career ==
Like his brother, Paul Shirtliff began his career at Sheffield Wednesday, where he signed a professional contract in November 1980. However, unlike his brother, Paul never became a first-team regular at Hillsborough, and only played a handful of games for the club. In July 1984, he moved to Northampton Town on a free transfer. He spent one season with the Cobblers, playing 29 league games. He then dropped down to non-league level, and signed with Frickley Athletic in August 1985.

Shirtliff spent three seasons with Frickley, playing more than 150 games for the club, and was twice named the club's Supporters' Player of the Year. In 1988, he moved to Boston United for a £12,500 transfer fee. In four years at York Street, Shirtliff played 197 first-team games for the Pilgrims, and scored two goals.

In 1992, Shirtliff moved to Dagenham & Redbridge where he spent one season, and played 33 league games.

Shirtliff died on 13 September 2009, aged 46, due to cancer.
