= Paul Bancroft =

English footballer

Personal information
- Full name: Paul Andrew Bancroft
- Date of birth: 10 September 1964 (age 62)
- Place of birth: Derby, England
- Position: Midfielder

Youth career
- –1982: Derby County

Senior career*
Years	Team	Apps	(Gls)
1982–1984	Derby County	0	(0)
1983	→ Crewe Alexandra (loan)	21	(3)
1984–1985	Northampton Town	16	(0)
- Nuneaton Borough
- Burton Albion
- Kidderminster Harriers
- Kettering Town
- Shepshed Dynamo
Total		37	(3)

International career
1989–1991	England C	6	(0)
- * Club domestic league appearances and goals

Paul Andrew Bancroft (born 10 September 1964) was an English professional footballer who played as a midfielder in the Football League for Derby County, Crewe Alexandra and Northampton Town. He missed a crucial penalty for Burton Albion.
