= Stewart Hamill =

Scottish footballer

Personal information
- Full name: Stewart Peter Hamill
- Date of birth: 22 January 1960 (age 66)
- Place of birth: Glasgow, Scotland
- Height: 5 ft 9 in (1.75 m)
- Position: Winger

Senior career*
Years	Team	Apps	(Gls)
- Pollok
1980–1982	Leicester City	10	(2)
1981–1982	→ Scunthorpe United (loan)	4	(0)
1982–1983	Kettering Town		
1983–1985	Nuneaton Borough		
1985–1986	Northampton Town	3	(1)
1986–1987	Altrincham		
1987–ww	Scarborough	28	(3)
Total		45	(6)
- * Club domestic league appearances and goals

Stewart Peter Hamill (born 22 January 1960) is a Scottish former footballer who played in the Football League for Leicester City, Scunthorpe United, Northampton Town and Scarborough.
