= Ray Train =

English footballer (born 1951)

Personal information
- Full name: Raymond Train
- Date of birth: 10 February 1951 (age 75)
- Place of birth: Bedworth, Warwickshire, England
- Height: 5 ft 5 in (1.65 m)
- Position: Defensive midfielder

Youth career
- Bedworth United

Senior career*
Years	Team	Apps	(Gls)
1967–1971	Walsall	73	(11)
1971–1976	Carlisle United	155	(8)
1976–1977	Sunderland	32	(1)
1977–1978	Bolton Wanderers	51	(0)
1978–1982	Watford	92	(3)
1982–1984	Oxford United	50	(0)
1983	→ A.F.C. Bournemouth (loan)	7	(0)
1984–1985	Northampton Town	46	(1)
1985–1986	Tranmere Rovers	36	(0)
1986–1987	Walsall	16	(0)
Total		558	(24)
- * Club domestic league appearances and goals

Raymond Train (born 10 February 1951) is an English former football player, coach, scout and manager. He played primarily as a defensive midfielder, but also frequently played in more attacking positions, including as a striker. He amassed over 500 appearances in the Football League, and achieved promotion to the First Division with Carlisle United, Sunderland, Bolton Wanderers and Watford. After retiring as a player, Train turned to coaching, and briefly managed Walsall as a caretaker in the 1988–89 season.

== Playing career ==
Born in Bedworth, Warwickshire, Train started his career as an amateur at Bedworth United. He was rejected as a triallist by Coventry City due to his lack of height, but joined Walsall as an apprentice in 1967, and turned professional the following year. He remained at the club until 1971, when he joined Second Division side Carlisle United.

After 20 appearances in his debut season, Train established himself as a first-team regular at Carlisle. He played 48 times as the team finished just above the relegation places in 1972–73, and 32 times as they secured promotion the following season. He was everpresent during their First Division campaign, scoring twice, and remained at Carlisle for most of 1975–76, before joining Sunderland for £90,000 in March 1976. Sunderland were promoted as champions at the end of the season. Train left Sunderland for Bolton Wanderers in March 1977, and this time was involved in a title-winning campaign from the start, as Bolton won the 1977–78 Second Division title.

Train joined newly promoted Third Division side Watford in November 1978, for a fee of £50,000. He scored on his debut, a 1–1 draw against Mansfield Town at Vicarage Road on 2 December. He played a further 22 matches that season, as Watford secured promotion to the Second Division. He remained at Watford until 1981–82, the season in which Watford were promoted to the First Division for the first time in their history; Watford were the fourth club to achieve promotion to the top level of English football with Train on the books. At the end of the season, Train joined Oxford United for a fee of £10,000.

After leaving Watford, Train spent brief playing spells at Oxford, A.F.C. Bournemouth, Northampton Town and Tranmere Rovers, before returning to Walsall in 1986. He made his final appearance in January 1987, shortly before his 36th birthday.

== Coaching career ==
Train started his coaching career when he returned to Walsall, initially combining his playing duties with a role as youth team coach. He became caretaker manager in December 1988, following the departure of Tommy Coakley, but was unable to improve the team's results, and reverted to his previous role in January 1989.

After a brief spell as community officer at Port Vale in 1990, Train joined Middlesbrough as a coach. During the 1991–92 season, Middlesbrough finished second in the Second Division, securing promotion to the Premier League for its inaugural season. He later became the club's chief scout, and remained at the club for a total of 13 years.
