= 1983–84 Associate Members' Cup =

1983–84 Associate Members Cup
Tournament details
- Country: England; Wales
- Teams: 48

Final positions
- Champions: Bournemouth
- Runners-up: Hull City

Tournament statistics
- Matches played: 49
- Goals scored: 160 (3.27 per match)

The 1983–84 Associate Members' Cup was the third staging of a secondary football league tournament, and the first staging of Associate Members' Cup. It was a reconstitution of the Football League Group Cup. The format was changed to a knock-out competition for English football clubs in the Third Division and the Fourth Division. Previously it had been an invitation 32-team tournament with a group stage and knock-out competition, with clubs from all 4 levels of the football league. The winners were Bournemouth and the runners-up were Hull City.

The competition began on 20 February 1984 and ended with the final on 24 May 1984 at Boothferry Park, the home stadium of the losing finalists.

In the first round, there were two sections: North and South. In the following rounds each section gradually eliminates teams in knock-out fashion until each has a winning finalist. At this point, the two winning finalists faced each other in the combined final for the honour of the trophy.

== First round ==
=== Northern Section ===
Date	Home team	Score	Away team
20 February	Tranmere Rovers (4)	2–0	Halifax Town(4)
21 February	Burnley(3)	2–1	Bolton Wanderers(3)
21 February	Bury(4)	1–0	Wigan Athletic(3)
21 February	Mansfield Town	1–3	Darlington(4)
21 February	Rotherham United(3)	0–1	Sheffield United(3)
21 February	Scunthorpe United(3)	2–1	Chesterfield(4)
21 February	York City(4)	1–2	Hull City(3)
22 February	Bradford City(3)	3–2	Hartlepool United(4)
22 February	Chester City(4)	2 – 1	Blackpool(4)
22 February	Lincoln City(3)	0–2	Doncaster Rovers(4)
22 February	Rochdale(4)	0–3	Preston North End(3)
22 February	Stockport County(4)	2 – 2	Crewe Alexandra(4)
Crewe Alexandra won 3–0 on penalties

=== Southern Section ===
Date	Home team	Score	Away team
20 February	Southend United(3)	5–0	Reading(4)
21 February	Bournemouth(3)	4–0	Aldershot(4)
21 February	Brentford(3)	3–2	Leyton Orient(3)
21 February	Colchester United(4)	2–1	Wimbledon(3)
21 February	Plymouth Argyle(3)	5–1	Torquay United(4)
21 February	Walsall(3)	3–1	Northampton Town(4)
21 February	Wrexham(4)	3 – 2	Peterborough United(4)
22 February	Exeter City(4)	3–1	Bristol City(4)
22 February	Hereford United(4)	0–1	Port Vale(4)
22 February	Oxford United(3)	1–3	Swindon Town(4)
28 February	Millwall(3)	4–3	Gillingham(3)
28 February	Newport County(4)	0–1	Bristol Rovers(3)

== Second round ==
In this round, in each section, the 6 winners and the 2 "lucky losers" progressed to the quarter-finals. Lucky losers are marked with the letters ^{LL}.

=== Northern Section ===
Date	Home team	Score	Away team
12 March	Tranmere Rovers	4–1	Chester City
13 March	Burnley	2–1	Darlington
13 March	Doncaster Rovers	2–1	Preston North End^{LL}
13 March	Hull City	1–0	Bury
13 March	Scunthorpe United^{LL}	4 – 4	Crewe Alexandra
Crewe Alexandra won 7–6 on penalties
13 March	Sheffield United	2–1	Bradford City

=== Southern Section ===
Date	Home team	Score	Away team
13 March	Bristol Rovers	2–0	Port Vale
13 March	Colchester United	0–2	Southend United
13 March	Millwall^{LL}	2 – 2	Bournemouth
Bournemouth won 7–6 on penalties
13 March	Swindon Town	3–0	Walsall
14 March	Wrexham	2–0	Exeter City^{LL}
26 March	Plymouth Argyle	2 – 0	Brentford

== Quarter-finals ==
=== Northern Section ===
Date	Home team	Score	Away team
20 March	Doncaster Rovers	1 – 3	Burnley
20 March	Hull City	3–0	Preston North End
20 March	Scunthorpe United	2–3	Sheffield United
20 March	Tranmere Rovers	0 – 0	Crewe Alexandra
Tranmere Rovers won 4–3 on penalties

=== Southern Section ===
Date	Home team	Score	Away team
27 March	Millwall	3–1	Swindon Town
3 April	Bournemouth	2–0	Wrexham
3 April	Southend United	1–2	Bristol Rovers
24 April	Plymouth Argyle	2–1	Exeter City

== Area semi-finals ==
=== Northern Section ===
Date	Home team	Score	Away team
17 April	Tranmere Rovers	2 – 0	Burnley
2 May	Hull City	1–0	Sheffield United

=== Southern Section ===
Date	Home team	Score	Away team
14 May	Bournemouth	1–0	Bristol Rovers
17 May	Plymouth Argyle	0–1	Millwall

== Area finals ==
=== Northern Area final ===
18 May 1984

Hull City	4–1	Tranmere Rovers
	Report

Boothferry Park, Hull
Attendance: 5,478

=== Southern Area final ===
21 May 1984

Bournemouth	2–1	Millwall
	Report

Dean Court, Bournemouth
Attendance: 4,058

== Final ==
24 May 1984

Hull City	1–2	Bournemouth
McNeil 12'		Graham 27'; Morrell 73'

Boothferry Park, Hull
Attendance: 6,544

== Notes ==
General

- statto.com

Specific
