= Austin Hayes =

Footballer (1958–1986)

Personal information
- Full name: Austin William Patrick Hayes
- Date of birth: 15 July 1958
- Place of birth: Hammersmith, England
- Date of death: 3 December 1986 (aged 28)
- Place of death: Hammersmith, England
- Height: 5 ft 5 in (1.65 m)
- Position: Left winger

Youth career
- 1974–1976: Southampton

Senior career*
Years	Team	Apps	(Gls)
1976–1981	Southampton	32	(5)
1978	→ Los Angeles Aztecs (loan)	22	(4)
1981–1983	Millwall	47	(5)
1983–1985	Northampton Town	64	(14)
1985	→ Barnet (loan)	?	(2)
1986	Friska Viljor	21	(3)
Total		186	(33)

International career
1978–1980	Republic of Ireland U21	5	(0)
1979	Republic of Ireland	1	(0)
- * Club domestic league appearances and goals

Austin William Patrick Hayes (15 July 1958 – 3 December 1986) was a professional footballer who played as a left winger. He was a member of the Southampton team that were runners-up in the 1979 League Cup final. Born in England, Hayes played once as a full international for the Republic of Ireland national team in 1979.

== Early life ==
Hayes was born in Hammersmith, London, to Irish parents in 1958 and was raised in Chiswick.

== Club career ==
Hayes began his professional career as a left winger at Southampton in 1976. He scored twice on his debut in a European Cup Winners' Cup tie at home to Carrick Rangers on 3 November 1976. Shortly after turning 19-years-old, he was sent on loan to American club Los Angeles Aztecs.

He played in the 1979 League Cup final but Southampton lost to Nottingham Forest. Hayes was never able to cement a regular first-team place, with players of the calibre of Kevin Keegan, Charlie George and Phil Boyer also in the Saints squad. His last appearance for Southampton came on 3 May 1980 against Middlesbrough and he was transferred to Millwall for £50,000 in February 1981, later turning out for Northampton Town and then for Barnet in the Gola League. His last club was Swedish side Friska Viljor.

== International career ==
He made his solitary appearance for Republic of Ireland in a 2–0 victory over Denmark at Lansdowne Road on 2 May 1979.

== Death ==
In December 1986, Hayes died at the age of 28 from lung cancer after contracting pneumonia, just three weeks after the illness was diagnosed. Earlier that year he had spent a short time playing in Sweden and had recently returned to England when he became ill.

== Honours ==
Southampton

- Football League Cup runner-up: 1978–79
