= Russell Lewis (footballer) =

Welsh footballer (born 1956)

Personal information
- Full name: Russell Lewis
- Date of birth: 15 September 1956 (age 70)
- Place of birth: Blaengwynfi, Wales
- Height: 5 ft 11 in (1.80 m)
- Position: Defender

Senior career*
Years	Team	Apps	(Gls)
1974–1976	Bridgend		
1976–1983	Swindon Town	181	(7)
1983–1986	Northampton Town	132	(6)
1986–1990	Kettering Town		
1990–1992	Merthyr Tydfil		
1992	Rushden & Diamonds		
Total		313	(13)
- * Club domestic league appearances and goals

Russell Lewis (born 15 September 1956) is a Welsh former footballer who made more than 300 appearances in the Football League playing as a defender for Northampton Town and Swindon Town.
