= Brian Mundee =

English footballer (born 1964)

Personal information
- Full name: Brian George Mundee
- Date of birth: 12 January 1964 (age 62)
- Place of birth: Hammersmith, England
- Height: 5 ft 9 in (1.75 m)
- Position: Left back

Youth career
- 1978-1979: Swindon Town
- 1981-1982: Hungerford Town

Senior career*
Years	Team	Apps	(Gls)
1982–1983	AFC Bournemouth	4	(0)
1983–1986	Northampton Town	100	(3)
1986	Cambridge United	16	(1)
1987	Maidstone United	3	(0)
1987	Weymouth	5	(0)
1987–1988	Salisbury	19	(0)
1989	Hamrun Spartans	1	(1)
1990	Żurrieq	11	(0)
1990–1992	Hamrun Spartans	19	(1)
1992	Basingstoke Town	6	(0)
1992–1993	Salisbury	6	(0)
1995–1996	Basingstoke Town	18	(1)
2000–2001	Bournemouth FC		
2002–2003	Poole Town		
- * Club domestic league appearances and goals

Brian George Mundee (born 12 January 1964) is an English retired professional footballer who made over 100 appearances as a left back in the Football League for Northampton Town, Cambridge United and AFC Bournemouth. He later played European football for Maltese Premier League clubs Hamrun Spartans and Żurrieq.

== Personal life ==
Mundee is the older brother of former footballer Denny Mundee.
