= 1982–83 AFC Bournemouth season =

Bournemouth
1982–83 season
- Manager: Don Megson**From 9 March 1983**
- Stadium: Dean Court
- Third Division: 14th
- FA Cup: First Round
- League Cup: Second Round

During the 1982–83 English football season, AFC Bournemouth competed in the Football League Third Division.

== Final league table ==
Pos	Team	Pld	W	D	L	GF	GA	GD	Pts
12	Bradford City	46	16	13	17	68	69	−1	61
13	Gillingham	46	16	13	17	58	59	−1	61
14	Bournemouth	46	16	13	17	59	68	−9	61
15	Southend United	46	15	14	17	66	65	+1	59
16	Preston North End	46	15	13	18	60	69	−9	58

== Results ==
Bournemouth's score comes first

=== Legend ===
Win	Draw	Loss

=== Football League Third Division ===
Date	Opponent	Venue	Result	Attendance
28 August 1982	Walsall	H	3–0	5,330
4 September 1982	Oxford United	A	0–2	4,729
8 September 1982	Millwall	A	0–2	3,012
11 September 1982	Sheffield United	H	0–0	6,424
18 September 1982	Wigan Athletic	A	2–1	4,866
25 September 1982	Exeter City	H	2–0	7,547
28 September 1982	Southend United	H	0–2	4,502
2 October 1982	Wrexham	A	0–1	2,046
9 October 1982	Cardiff City	H	3–1	5,818
16 October 1982	Portsmouth	A	2–0	10,961
19 October 1982	Plymouth Argyle	A	0–2	2,525
23 October 1982	Gillingham	H	0–1	5,528
30 October 1982	Preston North End	A	1–0	3,589
2 November 1982	Bristol Rovers	H	0–0	6,263
6 November 1982	Huddersfield Town	H	0–1	5,194
13 November 1982	Newport County	A	1–5	4,071
27 November 1982	Bradford City	H	2–2	4,025
30 November 1982	Bristol Rovers	A	1–1	4,356
4 December 1982	Chesterfield	A	0–0	2,226
18 December 1982	Lincoln City	A	0–9	3,597
27 December 1982	Reading	H	1–1	6,118
28 December 1982	Orient	A	0–5	3,718
1 January 1983	Brentford	H	4–3	5,593
3 January 1983	Doncaster Rovers	A	1–2	3,298
15 January 1983	Walsall	A	1–3	2,735
22 January 1983	Millwall	H	3–0	4,707
29 January 1983	Sheffield United	A	2–2	11,614
1 February 1983	Oxford United	H	2–0	3,776
5 February 1983	Exeter City	A	2–4	3,008
12 February 1983	Wrexham	H	1–1	3,827
19 February 1983	Cardiff City	A	1–1	4,878
26 February 1983	Portsmouth	H	0–2	13,506
5 March 1983	Gillingham	A	5–2	3,485
12 March 1983	Preston North End	H	4–0	4,407
15 March 1983	Plymouth Argyle	H	1–0	4,258
19 March 1983	Huddersfield Town	A	0–0	8,630
26 March 1983	Newport County	H	0–1	9,121
2 April 1983	Orient	H	2–0	7,039
4 April 1983	Reading	A	1–2	4,664
9 April 1983	Chesterfield	H	2–1	5,227
16 April 1983	Southend United	A	0–0	4,275
23 April 1983	Lincoln City	H	1–0	5,018
30 April 1983	Bradford City	A	3–2	3,455
2 May 1983	Doncaster Rovers	H	2–2	3,995
7 May 1983	Wigan Athletic	H	2–2	4,523
14 May 1983	Brentford	A	1–2	6,191

=== FA Cup ===
Round	Date	Opponent	Venue	Result
R1	20 November 1982	Southend United	H	0–2

=== League Cup ===
Round	Date	Opponent	Venue	Result	Notes
R1 1st Leg	31 August 1982	Plymouth Argyle	A	0–2	
R1 2nd Leg	14 September 1982	Plymouth Argyle	H	3–0	Bournemouth won 3–2 on aggregate
R1 1st Leg	6 October 1982	Manchester United	A	0–2	
R1 2nd Leg	26 October 1982	Manchester United	H	2–2	Manchester United won 4–2 on aggregate

== Squad ==
Note: Flags indicate national team as defined under FIFA eligibility rules; some limited exceptions apply. Players may hold more than one non-FIFA nationality.

Pos.	Nation	Player
GK	ENG	Ian Leigh
GK	ENG	Kenny Allen
DF	ENG	Phil Brignull
DF	ENG	Paul Compton
DF	ENG	John Impey
DF	WAL	Peter Aitken
DF	ENG	David Webb
DF	ENG	Mark Nightingale
DF	SCO	Brian O'Donnell
DF	YUG	Ivan Golac
DF	ENG	Derek Dawkins
DF	ENG	Chris Sulley
DF	ENG	Brian Mundee
DF	ENG	Tom Heffernan

Pos.	Nation	Player
MF	ENG	John Beck
MF	ENG	Steve Carter
MF	ENG	Kevin Dawtry
MF	ENG	Milton Graham
MF	ENG	David Madden
MF	ENG	Jimmy Neighbour
MF	ENG	Chris Shaw
MF	ENG	Nigel Spackman
MF	ENG	Keith Williams
MF	NIR	George Best
MF	ENG	Harry Redknapp
FW	ENG	Andy Crawford
FW	ENG	Tony Funnell
FW	ENG	Trevor Morgan
FW	ENG	Trevor Lee
