= 1983–84 AFC Bournemouth season =

Bournemouth
1983–84 season
- Manager: Don Megson/Harry Redknapp
- Stadium: Dean Court
- Third Division: 17th
- FA Cup: Fourth Round
- League Cup: First Round
- Associate Members Cup: Champions

During the 1983–84 English football season, AFC Bournemouth competed in the Football League Third Division.

== Final league table ==
Pos	Team	Pld	W	D	L	GF	GA	GD	Pts
15	Wigan Athletic	46	16	13	17	46	56	−10	61
16	Preston North End	46	15	11	20	66	66	0	56
17	Bournemouth	46	16	7	23	63	73	−10	55
18	Rotherham United	46	15	9	22	57	64	−7	54
19	Plymouth Argyle	46	13	12	21	56	62	−6	51

== Results ==
Bournemouth's score comes first

=== Legend ===
Win	Draw	Loss

=== Football League Third Division ===
Date	Opponent	Venue	Result	Attendance
27 August 1983	Preston North End	H	0–1	4,163
3 September 1983	Burnley	A	1–5	5,512
6 September 1983	Wimbledon	A	2–3	2,345
10 September 1983	Wigan Athletic	A	0–1	3,161
17 September 1983	Millwall	A	1–3	4,774
24 September 1983	Gillingham	H	2–0	3,045
27 September 1983	Bristol Rovers	H	0–1	3,328
1 October 1983	Lincoln City	A	0–3	3,586
8 October 1983	Plymouth Argyle	H	2–1	3,759
15 October 1983	Sheffield United	A	0–2	8,984
18 October 1983	Walsall	A	1–3	3,782
22 October 1983	Oxford United	H	2–1	4,758
29 October 1983	Brentford	A	1–1	4,630
1 November 1983	Rotherham United	H	4–2	3,495
5 November 1983	Hull City	H	2–3	4,644
11 November 1983	Southend United	A	0–0	3,277
26 November 1983	Bolton Wanderers	H	2–2	3,941
3 December 1983	Scunthorpe United	A	2–1	2,344
17 December 1983	Bradford City	A	2–5	2,802
26 December 1983	Newport County	H	1–1	7,220
27 December 1983	Orient	A	0–2	4,077
31 December 1983	Exeter City	H	3–1	5,133
2 January 1984	Port Vale	A	1–2	4,008
14 January 1984	Preston North End	A	0–2	3,476
21 January 1984	Millwall	H	1–1	4,242
4 February 1984	Lincoln City	H	3–0	3,597
18 February 1984	Brentford	H	0–3	4,308
25 February 1984	Oxford United	A	2–3	6,535
3 March 1984	Walsall	H	3–0	3,913
6 March 1984	Hull City	A	1–3	8,047
10 March 1984	Southend United	H	1–0	3,615
17 March 1984	Plymouth Argyle	A	0–1	7,325
20 March 1984	Wigan Athletic	A	3–1	2,910
24 March 1984	Sheffield United	H	0–1	4,767
31 March 1984	Wimbledon	H	2–3	3,538
7 April 1984	Bristol Rovers	H	3–1	5,032
9 April 1984	Burnley	A	1–0	4,113
14 April 1984	Scunthorpe United	H	1–1	3,501
17 April 1984	Rotherham United	H	0–1	3,937
21 April 1984	Newport County	A	1–2	2,356
24 April 1984	Orient	H	3–2	3,736
28 April 1984	Bolton Wanderers	A	1–0	3,045
5 May 1984	Port Vale	H	1–1	3,305
4 May 1984	Bristol City	A	0–2	7,083
7 May 1984	Exeter City	A	2–0	2,790
12 May 1984	Bradford City	H	4–1	3,608

=== FA Cup ===
Round	Date	Opponent	Venue	Result
R1	19 November 1983	Walsall	H	4–0
R2	13 December 1983	Windsor & Eton	H	0–0
R2R	19 December 1983	Windsor & Eton	A	2–0
R3	7 January 1984	Manchester United	H	2–0
R4	31 January 1984	Middlesbrough	A	0–2

=== League Cup ===
Round	Date	Opponent	Venue	Result	Notes
R1 1st Leg	30 August 1983	Bristol Rovers	H	1–2	
R1 2nd Leg	13 September 1983	Bristol Rovers	A	2–2	Bristol Rovers won 4–3 on aggregate

=== Associate Members Cup ===
Round	Date	Opponent	Venue	Result	Attendance	Notes
SR1	21 February 1984	Aldershot	H	4–0	1,706	
SR2	13 March 1984	Millwall	A	2–2	2,099	Bournemouth won 7-6 on penalties
SQF	3 April 1984	Wrexham	H	2–0	1,909	
SSF	14 May 1984	Bristol Rovers	H	1–0	2,810	
SFinal	21 May 1984	Millwall	H	2–1	4,058	
Final	24 May 1984	Hull City	A	2–1	6,544	

== Squad ==
Note: Flags indicate national team as defined under FIFA eligibility rules; some limited exceptions apply. Players may hold more than one non-FIFA nationality.

Pos.	Nation	Player
GK	ENG	Ian Leigh
GK	ENG	Neil Ramsbottom
GK	ENG	John Smeulders
DF	ENG	Phil Brignull
DF	ENG	Roger Brown
DF	ENG	Max Thompson
DF	ENG	Mark Nightingale
DF	ENG	Paul Morrell
DF	ENG	Chris Sulley
DF	ENG	Everald La Ronde
MF	ENG	Mark Schiavi
MF	ENG	John Beck
MF	ENG	Keith Williams

Pos.	Nation	Player
MF	ENG	Milton Graham
MF	ENG	Morgan Lewis
MF	ENG	Robbie Savage
MF	ENG	Chris Shaw
MF	ENG	Steve Carter
MF	ENG	Kevin Dawtry
MF	ENG	Martin Duffield
MF	IRL	Sean O'Driscoll
MF	ENG	Ray Train
FW	ENG	Trevor Lee
FW	ENG	Trevor Morgan
FW	SCO	Billy Rafferty
FW	ENG	Ian Thompson
