= List of AFC Bournemouth players (25–99 appearances) =

This is a list of footballers who have played 25 to 99 senior matches for AFC Bournemouth (previously Bournemouth & Boscombe Athletic). Appearances and goals are for all competitive matches.

Name	Nationality	Position	Club career	Appearances	Goals	Notes
Hugh Davey	Northern Ireland	FW	1923-1924	43	22	
Jimmy Miller	England	MF	1923-1924	38	0	
Foster Robinson	England	MF	1923-1924	31	1	
Joe Armstrong	England	FW	1923-1924	29	2	
Jimmy Lister	Scotland	FW	1923-1924	28	7	
Bill Voisey	England	DF	1923-1924	26	2	
James Lamb	England	DF	1923-1925	63	0	
Alec Heron	England	GK	1923-1925	26	0	
Billy Leitch	Republic of Ireland	DF	1923-1926	82	1	
Edgar Saxton	England	DF	1923-1928	80	0	
Bob McCulloch	Scotland	MF	1924-1925	39	5	
George Wilson	Republic of Ireland	GK	1924-1926	87	0	
Les Roberts	England	FW	1924-1926	56	12	
Joe Readman	England	FW	1924-1927	50	20	
Jim Buchanan	Scotland	FW	1924-1928	75	10	
Harry Maidment	England	MF	1924-1928	75	17	
George Collin	England	DF	1925-1926	56	0	
Arthur Roe	England	DF	1925-1926	55	2	
Dan Thomson	Scotland	MF	1926-1927	25	2	
Frank Taylor	England	FW	1926-1928	70	26	
Jimmy Blair	Scotland	DF	1926-1928	67	0	
Jock Robson	Scotland	GK	1926-1928	48	0	
Jamie Crumley	Scotland	GK	1926-1929	57	0	
Percy Cherrett	England	FW	1928-1929	43	21	
Charlie Dixon	England	DF	1928-1929	32	0	
Albert Smith	England	DF	1928-1929	28	1	
Bob Bryce	Scotland	MF	1928-1930	75	27	
Reg Wright	England	DF	1928-1930	31	0	
Sam Brown	Scotland	DF	1929-1931	65	0	
Harry Scott	England	FW	1929-1932	86	36	
Sammy Beswick	England	FW	1929-1932	62	16	
Alex Forbes	Scotland	DF	1929-1932	54	1	
Joe Birch	England	DF	1930-1931	27	0	
Harry Sherman	England	MF	1930-1932	25	4	
Len Williams	Wales	MF	1930-1933	96	18	
Willie Webb	Scotland	FW	1930-1933	62	7	
Reg Trim	England	DF	1931-1933	25	0	
Joe Miller	Republic of Ireland	DF	1932-1934	81	0	
Jack Proctor	England	DF	1932-1934	58	0	
Reg Parker	England	DF	1932-1935	50	0	
Bill Richmond	Scotland	DF	1932-1935	27	0	
Billy Gold	Scotland	GK	1932-1936	83	0	
Joe Coen	Scotland	GK	1933-1934	39	0	
John Friar	Scotland	MF	1933-1934	38	13	
Jack Randle	England	DF	1933-1934	32	0	
Jack Fletcher	England	FW	1933-1934	29	4	
Jack Surtees	England	FW	1933-1934	25	6	
Alex Ritchie	Scotland	MF	1934-1935	34	12	
John Turner	England	DF	1934-1936	42	1	
George Bellis	England	DF	1935-1936	64	0	
Jack Smith	England	FW	1935-1936	46	2	
Billy Barrow	Wales	MF	1935-1936	33	8	
Tom King	England	DF	1935-1937	78	0	
Eddie Lawrence	Wales	DF	1936-1937	43	1	
Len Brooks	England	GK	1937-1938	43	0	
Harry Mardon	Wales	FW	1937-1938	25	14	
Peter Monaghan	Scotland	DF	1937-1939	74	2	
Jimmy Lovery	England	MF	1937-1939	34	9	
Norman Millar	Northern Ireland	DF	1937-1939	27	5	
Bob Redfern	England	MF	1937-1947	98	7	
William Sellars	Scotland	GK	1938-1939	29	0	
Billy Tunnicliffe	England	MF	1938-1947	60	9	
Jack Kirkham	England	FW	1938-1947	56	34	
Pat Gallacher	Scotland	FW	1938-1947	41	6	
Tommy Paton	Scotland	DF	1939-1947	54	13	
Charlie Burke	Scotland	DF	1945-1947	28	7	
Jack McDonald	England	MF	1945-1948	88	36	
Ernie Tagg	England	DF	1945-1948	87	9	
Fred Rowell	England	FW	1946-1948	34	11	
Dudley Milligan	South Africa	FW	1947-1948	48	27	
Johnny MacKenzie	Scotland	MF	1947-1948	41	9	
Harry Gray	England	FW	1947-1948	31	7	
Jimmy Blair	Scotland	FW	1947-1949	84	9	
Jack Percival	England	MF	1947-1949	55	1	
Dennis Rampling	England	MF	1948-1949	25	4	
Jimmy Stirling	Scotland	DF	1948-1950	77	1	
Billy Lunn	Northern Ireland	FW	1948-1950	50	19	
Ray Weigh	Wales	FW	1949-1950	32	9	
Alec Blakeman	England	FW	1949-1950	30	8	
Arnold Stephens	England	MF	1949-1950 1953-1954	76	13	
Jack Lewis	England	DF	1949-1951	49	1	
Cliff Marsh	England	FW	1949-1952	39	2	
Jackie Fisher	England	DF	1949-1953	57	0	
Cameron Buchanan	Scotland	FW	1949-1955	88	18	
Billy Gripton	England	DF	1950-1952	80	0	
Tommy Casey	Northern Ireland	DF	1950-1952	68	1	
Danny Boxshall	England	MF	1950-1952	53	9	
Derek Stroud	England	MF	1950-1953	82	18	
Tommy Tippett	England	MF	1951-1952	38	10	
Les Eyre	England	FW	1951-1953	40	12	
Gordon Neave	England	DF	1951-1954	89	0	
Len Gaynor	England	FW	1951-1954	54	12	
Roy Littlejohn	England	MF	1952 1955	25	2	
Bob Hardy	England	DF	1952-1954	81	0	
Frank Fidler	England	FW	1952-1955	64	33	
Martin MacDonald	Scotland	MF	1952-1955	54	1	
Harry Hughes	England	DF	1952-1958	86	2	
Bill Thompson	Scotland	DF	1953-1954	49	0	
Peter Rushworth	England	DF	1953-1957	94	1	
Albert Keetley	England	DF	1953-1958	91	0	
Ralph Hunt	England	FW	1954-1955	36	8	
Alistair Gunn	Scotland	MF	1954-1955	28	2	
Ian Allen	Scotland	MF	1954-1956	55	12	
Brian Siddall	England	FW	1954-1957	88	17	
Derek Leaver	England	FW	1955-1956	30	5	
Lew Clayton	England	DF	1955-1957	44	1	
Nelson Stiffle	England	MF	1955-1957	41	8	
Les Melville	England	DF	1956-1957	27	0	
Bill Heath	England	GK	1956-1958	35	0	
Brian Bedford	Wales	FW	1956-1959	63	38	
Brian Loughnane	England	MF	1956-1959	45	6	
Alan Rule	England	DF	1957-1958	26	0	
Brian Gibbs	England	FW	1957-1962	64	17	
Rees Thomas	Wales	DF	1958-1959	49	0	
Tommy Southren	England	MF	1958-1960	68	12	
Irvin Brown	England	DF	1958-1963	73	3	
Ray Evans	England	FW	1959-1960	41	11	
Ron Smith	England	MF	1959-1961	40	7	
Bill McGarry	England	DF	1961-1963	80	2	
Ron Spelman	England	MF	1961-1963	29	4	
Peter Thompson	England	FW	1962-1963	39	14	
Charlie Woods	England	FW	1962-1964	74	26	
Jimmy Singer	Wales	FW	1962-1964	61	22	
Derek Reeves	England	FW	1962-1964	38	8	
John Groves	England	DF	1963-1965	59	1	
Dennis Coughlin	England	FW	1963-1966	99	46	
Alan O'Neill	England	FW	1964-1965	39	8	
John Compton	England	DF	1964-1965	29	1	
Ken Hodgson	England	FW	1964-1966	86	28	
Dick Keith	Northern Ireland	DF	1964-1966	52	0	
Graham Newton	England	MF	1964-1966	31	3	
Phil Ferns	England	DF	1965-1966	53	0	
Joe Ashworth	England	DF	1965-1967	66	2	
Tony Prescott	England	MF	1966-1967	63	7	
Rod Taylor	England	DF	1966-1967	31	0	
Ralph Norton	England	MF	1966-1968	50	4	
Tommy Taylor	England	MF	1966-1968	27	8	
Kevin White	England	MF	1966-1969	58	5	
Eddie Rowles	England	MF	1967-1971	73	13	
Lou Peters	England	MF	1968-1969	40	4	
Ralph Miller	England	DF	1968-1970	77	1	
Dennis Longhorn	England	MF	1968-1971	35	2	
John Meredith	England	MF	1969-1970	56	1	
Chris Foote	England	MF	1969-1970	51	2	
Alan Summerhill	England	DF	1969-1970	33	0	
Trevor Hartley	England	MF	1969-1971	47	3	
Tony Scott	England	MF	1970-1972	69	6	
Bill Kitchener	England	DF	1971-1972	42	2	
Tommy Mitchinson	England	MF	1971-1972	33	1	
Dave Chadwick	England	MF	1971-1974	37	4	
Brian Clark	England	FW	1972-1973	34	15	
Jimmy Gabirel	Scotland	MF	1972-1974	64	4	
Alan Groves	England	MF	1972-1974	40	5	
Les Parodi	England	DF	1973-1975	61	2	
John Delaney	England	DF	1973-1975	34	3	
Brian Greenhalgh	England	FW	1973-1975	27	8	
Howard Goddard	England	FW	1973-1976 1981-1982	90	28	
John Wingate	England	MF	1974-1975	42	3	
Alan Welsh	Scotland	MF	1974-1975	39	3	
Kevin Charlton	England	GK	1974-1975	26	0	
Derek Rickard	England	FW	1974-1976	37	8	
Phil Ashworth	England	FW	1975-1976	35	5	
Stuart Morgan	Wales	DF	1975-1977	87	5	
Kevin Reeves	England	FW	1975-1977	71	19	
Hughen Riley	England	MF	1976-1978	81	8	
Tommy Paterson	England	FW	1976-1978	64	11	
Jack Howarth	England	FW	1977-1978	49	8	
Derek Showers	Wales	FW	1977-1979	71	20	
Dave Lennard	England	MF	1977-1979	65	4	
Trevor Finnigan	England	FW	1978	25	5	
Gary Borthwick	England	MF	1978-1980	78	4	
Kenny Brown	England	MF	1978-1980	35	5	
Phil Holder	England	MF	1979-1980	62	4	
John Evanson	England	MF	1979-1980	60	3	
Neil Townsend	England	DF	1979-1980	39	2	
Brian Chambers	England	MF	1979-1981	46	8	
Jon Moore	Wales	DF	1979-1981	40	2	
Dean Mooney	England	FW	1980-1981	32	10	
Paul Compton	England	DF	1980-1982	76	1	
Brian Smith	England	MF	1981-1982	49	2	
Kevin Dawtry	England	MF	1981-1983	78	14	
Tony Funnell	England	FW	1981-1983	75	25	
Andy Crawford	England	FW	1981-1983	41	11	
Milton Graham	England	MF	1981-1985	91	17	
Trevor Lee	England	FW	1982-1983	37	10	
Steve Carter	England	MF	1982-1984	56	1	
Mark Schiavi	England	MF	1983-1985	34	0	
Everald La Ronde	England	DF	1983-1985	30	1	
Chris Shaw	England	MF	1983-1986	30	3	
Billy Rafferty	Scotland	FW	1984-1985	70	21	
Colin Russell	England	FW	1984-1986	87	18	
Gary Howlett	Republic of Ireland	MF	1984-1987	73	7	
Colin Clarke	Northern Ireland	FW	1985-1986 1989	60	37	
Carl Richards	Jamaica	FW	1986-1988	86	18	
David Puckett	England	FW	1986-1988 1991-1992	47	20	
David Coleman	England	DF	1986-1990	60	2	
Ian Bishop	England	MF	1988-1989	54	2	
Shaun Close	England	FW	1988-1989	44	8	
Gavin Peacock	England	MF	1989-1990	66	8	
Paul Moulden	England	FW	1989-1990	38	14	
Paul Miller	England	DF	1989-1991	57	1	
George Lawrence	England	MF	1989-1992	85	6	
Andy Jones	Wales	FW	1990-1991	48	14	
Wayne Fereday	England	MF	1990-1991	30	1	
Efan Ekoku	England	FW	1990-1993	75	25	
Keith Rowland	Northern Ireland	MF	1991-1992	88	2	
Jimmy Quinn	Northern Ireland	FW	1991-1992	54	24	
Jimmy Case	England	MF	1991-1992	50	2	
Brian McGorry	England	MF	1991-1994	83	14	
Neil Masters	Northern Ireland	DF	1992-1993	51	4	
Steve Cotterill	England	FW	1993-1994	55	18	
Warren Aspinall	England	MF	1993-1994	39	10	
Joe Parkinson	England	MF	1993-1994	39	2	
Gary Chivers	England	DF	1993-1994	38	2	
Chris Leadbitter	England	MF	1993-1995	68	3	
Mike McElhatton	Republic of Ireland	MF	1993-1995	50	3	
Kevin Russell	England	MF	1994	35	3	
Ian Andrews	England	GK	1994-1996	76	0	
Steve Jones	England	FW	1994-1996 1997-1998	90	34	
David Town	England	FW	1994-1999	66	2	
Mark Rawlinson	England	MF	1995-2000	90	2	
Owen Coll	Republic of Ireland	DF	1996	27	0	
Mike Dean	England	MF	1996-1999	36	0	
Franck Rolling	France	DF	1997-1998	37	8	
Dani Rodrigues	Portugal	FW	1998-1999 2004-2006	67	7	
Willie Huck	France	MF	1999-2001	49	2	
Jamie Day	England	MF	1999-2001	28	1	
Jermain Defoe	England	FW	2000-2001 2017-2018	65	23	
Chukki Eribenne	England	FW	2000-2002	55	1	
Narada Bernard	England	DF	2000-2003	39	0	
Stephen Cooke	England	MF	2002-2003 2005-2006	56	4	
Danny Thomas	England	MF	2002-2004	74	4	
Lewis Buxton	England	DF	2003-2004	46	0	
John Spicer	England	MF	2004-2005	50	8	
Steven Foley-Sheridan	Northern Ireland	MF	2005-2006	61	6	
Callum Hart	Wales	DF	2005-2006	56	0	
James O'Connor	England	DF	2005-2006	49	1	
Josh Growling	England	DF	2005-2008	94	1	
Darren Anderton	England	MF	2006-2008	78	13	
Sam Vokes	England	FW	2006-2008	59	16	
Marc Wilson	Northern Ireland	DF	2007	30	4	
Jo Kuffour	England	FW	2007-2008	51	14	
Max Gradel	Ivory Coast	MF	2007-2008 2015-2017	65	12	
Ryan Garry	England	DF	2007-2010	86	3	
Michael Symes	England	FW	2008 2010-2012	48	11	
Matt Tubbs	England	FW	2008 2012-2013	50	8	
Scott Guyett	England	DF	2008-2009	40	0	
Joel Ward	England	DF	2008-2009	25	1	
Sammy Igoe	England	MF	2008-2010	57	5	
Jeff Goulding	England	FW	2008-2010	48	5	
Mark Molesely	England	MF	2008-2012	60	5	
Joe Partington	England	MF	2008-2013	59	2	
Rhoys Wiggins	England	DF	2009-2011	72	2	
Danny Ings	England	FW	2009-2011	30	8	
Lyle Taylor	England	FW	2010-2012	34	2	
Donal McDermott	Republic of Ireland	FW	2011 2012-2013	35	3	
Scott Malone	England	DF	2011-2012	39	6	
Steven Gregory	England	MF	2011-2012	33	2	
Adam Barrett	England	DF	2011-2012	28	1	
Wes Fogden	England	MF	2011-2013	59	6	
Wes Thomas	England	FW	2011-2013	58	11	
Stéphane Zubar	Guadeloupe	DF	2011-2013	28	1	
Darryl Flahavan	England	GK	2011-2014	51	0	
Miles Addison	England	DF	2012	36	1	
Lee Camp	England	GK	2013-2015	47	0	
Ian Harte	Republic of Ireland	DF	2013-2015	35	1	
Yann Kermorgant	France	FW	2013-2016	69	27	
Tokelo Rantie	South Africa	FW	2013-2016	53	5	
Ryan Allsop	England	GK	2013-2017	27	0	
Benike Afobe	England	FW	2015-2018	70	11	
Jack Wilshere	England	MF	2016-2017 2021	44	2	
Jordon Ibe	England	MF	2016-2019	92	5	
Lys Mousset	France	FW	2016-2019	71	5	
Jack Simpson	England	DF	2017-2021	35	1	
Diego Rico	Spain	DF	2018-2021	83	1	
Sam Surridge	England	FW	2018-2021	42	7	
Harry Wilson	Wales	MF	2019-2020	35	7	
Arnaut Danjuma	Netherlands	DF	2019-2021	52	17	
Gavin Kilkenny	Republic of Ireland	MF	2019-2022 2024	25	0	
Jack Stacey	England	DF	2019-2023	98	1	
Mark Travers	Republic of Ireland	GK	2019-2025	82	0	
Jaidon Anthony	England	FW	2020-2023	99	12	
Jordan Zemura	Zimbabwe	DF	2020-2023	61	3	
Cameron Carter-Vickers	United States	DF	2021	26	1	
Jamal Lowe	Jamaica	FW	2021-2022	40	8	
Ben Pearson	England	MF	2021-2023	53	0	
Joe Rothwell	England	MF	2022-2023	35	1	
Kieffer Moore	Wales	FW	2022-2024	46	10	
Neto	Brazil	GK	2022-2025	63	0	
Justin Kluivert	Netherlands	MF	2023-	96	25	As of end of 2025-26 season
Alex Scott	England	MF	2023-	89	6	As of end of 2025-26 season
Tyler Adams	United States	MF	2023-	62	2	As of end of 2025-26 season
Luis Sinisterra	Colombia	MF	2023-	37	4	As of end of 2025-26 season
Enes Ünal	Turkey	FW	2023-	58	5	As of end of 2025-26 season
Max Aarons	England	DF	2023-	27	0	As of end of 2025-26 season
Dango Ouattara	Burkina Faso	FW	2023-2025	86	11	
Illya Zabarnyi	Ukraine	DF	2023-2025	86	1	
Milos Kerkez	Hungary	DF	2023-2025	74	2	
Evanilson	Brazil	FW	2024-	72	18	As of end of 2025-26 season
Dean Huijsen	Spain	DF	2024-2025	36	3	
Kepa Arrizabalaga	Spain	GK	2024-2025	35	0	
James Hill	England	DF	2022-	55	0	As of end of 2025-26 season
Dean Huijsen	Spain	DF	2024-2025	36	3	
Adrien Truffert	France	DF	2025-	39	1	As of end of 2025-26 season
Đorđe Petrović	Serbia	GK	2025-	40	0	As of end of 2025-26 season
Amine Adli	Morocco	MF	2025-	33	3	As of end of 2025-26 season
