= List of AFC Bournemouth players =

This is a list of footballers who have played 100 or more senior matches for AFC Bournemouth (previously Bournemouth & Boscombe Athletic). Appearances and goals are for all competitive matches.

Name	Nationality	Position	Club career	Appearances	Goals	Notes
Len Butt	England	DF	1923-1927	141	3	
Charles Smith	England	MF	1923-1928	184	6	
Dossie Miles	England	DF	1924-1929	104	11	
Pat Clifford	Wales	MF	1924-1930	209	23	
Frank Stringfellow	England	FW	1925-1929	133	34	
Ronnie Eyre	England	FW	1925-1932	337	229	
Jack Hayward	England	DF	1925-1933	278	30	
Cliff Halliwell	England	DF	1926-1932	243	2	
Jack Bradford	England	DF	1927-1930	129	1	
Peter McSevich	Scotland	GK	1928-1933	158	1	
Bill Moralee	England	DF	1928-1936	210	6	
Jack Whitehouse	England	FW	1930-1933	113	17	
Jack Russell	England	MF	1930-1934	148	47	
Jack Coxford	England	DF	1930-1934	145	3	
Alfie White	England	FW	1931-1936	135	36	
George Farrow	England	DF	1933-1936	121	14	
William Chalmers	Scotland	MF	1933-1938	171	30	
Dick Mellors	England	GK	1934-1937	129	0	
Eddie Parris	Wales	MF	1934-1937	117	37	
Fred Pincott	England	DF	1934-1939	221	0	
Willie Smith	Scotland	DF	1934-1939	169	8	
Joe Riley	England	FW	1935-1937	105	64	
Ernie Whittam	England	FW	1936-1939	111	29	
Fred Marsden	England	DF	1936-1949	217	4	
Joe Sanaghan	Scotland	DF	1937-1949	194	0	
Ken Bird	England	GK	1939-1953	266	0	
Dai Woodward	Wales	DF	1946-1954	286	7	
Jack Cross	England	FW	1947-1953	142	67	
Doug McGibbon	England	FW	1948-1951	106	65	
Denis Cheney	England	FW	1948-1954	164	49	
Laurie Cunningham	England	DF	1948-1956	273	12	
Ian Drummond	Scotland	DF	1949-1956	278	2	
Peter Harrison	England	MF	1952-1956	183	36	
Tommy Godwin	Republic of Ireland	GK	1952-1961	387	0	
Stan Newsham	England	FW	1953-1957	152	78	
John Crosland	England	DF	1954-1956	110	0	
Joe Brown	England	DF	1954-1960	230	5	
Ollie Norris	Northern Ireland	FW	1955-1958	104	40	
Reg Cutler	England	MF	1956-1958	104	23	
Mike Lyons	England	DF	1956-1959	114	1	
John Arnott	England	DF	1956-1962	188	22	
Arnold Woollard	Bermuda	DF	1956-1962	174	0	
Mike Burgess	England	FW	1957-1961	115	38	
Dickie Dowsett	England	FW	1957-1962	184	83	
Tony Nelson	Wales	DF	1957-1964	211	1	
Jimmy White	England	DF	1958 1966-1970	198	8	
Peter Gledstone	England	DF	1958-1964	142	2	
Tom Standley	England	DF	1958-1965	172	5	
Ronnie Bolton	England	MF	1958-1965 1967-1969	290	54	
Billy Coxon	England	MF	1958-1966	223	40	
Ray Bumstead	England	MF	1959-1970	465	66	
Bryn Jones	Wales	DF	1960-1963	131	5	
Chris Weller	England	FW	1960-1965 1966-1967	125	30	
John Archer	England	MF	1961-1966	158	40	
David Best	England	GK	1961-1966 1975-1976	254	0	
Brian Farmer	England	DF	1962-1965	141	0	
Charlie Crickmore	England	MF	1962-1966	142	19	
Roy Gater	England	DF	1962-1968	237	3	
Tommy Naylor	England	DF	1964-1970	159	3	
Roger Jones	England	GK	1965-1970	177	0	
Ken Pound	England	MF	1966-1969	113	26	
John Hold	England	MF	1966-1970	105	32	
David Stocks	England	DF	1966-1971	245	2	
Terry Gulliver	England	DF	1966-1972	190	2	
Keith East	England	FW	1967-1970	105	35	
Tony Powell	England	DF	1968-1974	247	12	
Ted MacDougall	Scotland	FW	1969-1972 1978-1980	223	144	
Kieron Baker	England	GK	1969-1978	250	0	
Fred Davies	England	GK	1970-1973	152	0	
Mel Machin	England	MF	1970-1973	126	8	
John Benson	Scotland	MF	1970-1973 1975-1978	178	0	
David Jones	England	DF	1970-1974	151	5	
John Sainty	England	FW	1970-1974	135	23	
Keith Miller	England	DF	1970-1980	433	19	
Phil Boyer	England	FW	1971-1974	159	50	
Micky Cave	England	MF	1971-1974 1977-1978	159	22	
Bobby Howe	England	DF	1972-1974	115	6	
Harry Redknapp	England	MF	1972-1976 1982	116	6	
Clive Payne	England	DF	1973-1976	117	3	
Steve Buttle	England	MF	1973-1977	163	12	
Neil Hague	England	DF	1974-1976	104	8	
Trevor Howard	England	MF	1974-1976	100	12	
Mark Nightingale	England	DF	1974-1976 1982-1986	240	8	
Ian Cunningham	Scotland	DF	1974-1981	209	4	
John Impey	England	DF	1975-1983	318	7	
Frank Barton	England	MF	1976-1978 1978-1979	101	18	
Peter Johnson	England	MF	1976-1979	120	12	
Geoff Butler	England	DF	1976-1981	133	1	
Roger Brown	England	DF	1978-1979 1983-1986	177	9	
Steve Massey	England	FW	1978-1981	116	22	
Kenny Allen	England	GK	1978-1983	174	0	
Phil Ferns	England	DF	1979-1981	102	6	
Tom Heffernan	Republic of Ireland	DF	1979-1983 1985-1988	259	28	
John Smeulders	England	GK	1980-1981 1984-1986 1987-1989	117	0	
Nigel Spackman	England	MF	1980-1983	136	12	
Trevor Morgan	England	FW	1980-1984	163	50	
Phil Brignull	England	DF	1981-1985	153	13	
Chris Sulley	England	DF	1981-1986	252	3	
Ian Leigh	England	GK	1981-1986	135	0	
Keith Williams	England	MF	1981-1986	126	4	
John Beck	England	MF	1982-1986	163	18	
Ian Thompson	England	FW	1983-1986	152	40	
Robbie Savage	England	MF	1983-1986	104	24	
Paul Morrell	England	DF	1983-1993	418	11	
Sean O'Driscoll	England	MF	1984-1994	511	24	Manager of Bournemouth 2000-2006
Mark O'Connor	England	MF	1985-1989 1993-1995	219	15	
Mark Newson	England	DF	1985-1990	205	27	
Mark Whitlock	England	DF	1986-1988	115	1	
Tony Pulis	Wales	DF	1986-1989 1990-1992	104	4	Manager of Bournemouth 1992-1994
Richard Cooke	England	MF	1986-1989 1991-1992	152	23	
Trevor Aylott	England	FW	1986-1990	170	33	
John Williams	England	DF	1986-1990	139	10	
Gerry Peyton	England	GK	1986-1991	238	0	
Shaun Brooks	England	MF	1987-1992 1994	149	14	
Luther Blissett	Jamaica	FW	1988-1991	142	61	
Kevin Bond	England	DF	1988-1992	155	6	Manager of Bournemouth 2006-2008
Matty Holmes	England	MF	1988-1992	136	8	
Denny Mundee	England	MF	1988-1993	122	12	
Shaun Teale	England	DF	1989-1991	116	5	
Vince Bartram	England	GK	1991-1994	162	0	
Paul Wood	England	MF	1991-1994	119	22	
Alex Watson	England	DF	1991-1995	182	7	
Mark Morris	England	DF	1991-1996	235	11	
Adrian Pennock	England	DF	1992-1995	161	10	
Scott Mean	England	MF	1992-1996	129	13	
Rob Murray	England	MF	1992-1998	171	14	
Steve Fletcher	England	FW	1992-2007 2009-2013	724	121	
Neil Moss	England	GK	1993-1995 2002-2007	222	0	
Russell Beardsmore	England	MF	1993-1998	220	7	
Jason Brissett	England	FW	1994-1998	142	10	
Jamie Vincent	England	DF	1994-1999	138	6	
Steve Robinson	Northern Ireland	MF	1994-2000	286	60	
Neil Young	England	DF	1994-2008	505	4	
Matt Holland	England	MF	1995-1997	116	18	
John Bailey	England	MF	1995-1999	184	7	
Eddie Howe	England	DF	1995-2002 2004-2007	311	15	Manager of Bournemouth 2008-2011 and 2012-2020
Jimmy Glass	England	GK	1996-1998	109	0	
Ian Cox	England	DF	1996-2000	207	17	
Jon O'Neill	Scotland	FW	1996-2000	152	12	
Christer Warren	England	DF	1997-2000	127	14	
James Hayter	England	FW	1997-2007	407	108	
Mark Stein	England	FW	1998-2000	115	44	
Mark Ovendale	England	GK	1998-2000	111	0	
Richard Hughes	Scotland	MF	1998-2002 2012-2013	185	17	
Carl Fletcher	England	MF	1998-2004	225	23	
Jason Tindall	England	DF	1998-2006 2009-2010	199	6	
Claus Jørgensen	Denmark	MF	1999-2001 2004	118	15	
Wade Elliott	England	MF	1999-2005	257	37	
Karl Broadhurst	England	DF	1999-2007	228	5	
Gareth Stewart	England	GK	1999-2008	180	0	
Warren Cummings	Scotland	DF	2000-2001 2003-2012	301	8	
Garreth O'Connor	Republic of Ireland	FW	2000-2005 2007	213	28	
Brian Stock	England	MF	2000-2006	172	19	
Stephen Purches	England	DF	2000-2007 2010-2012	321	13	
Warren Feeney	Northern Ireland	FW	2001-2004	125	37	
Derek Holmes	Scotland	FW	2001-2005	136	18	
Shaun Maher	Republic of Ireland	DF	2001-2006	128	6	
Alan Connell	England	FW	2002-2005 2008-2010	109	19	
Marcus Browning	England	MF	2002-2007	214	7	
Andrew Surman	England	MF	2005 2013-2020	226	11	
Brett Pitman	Jersey	FW	2005-2010 2012-2015	302	101	
Shaun Cooper	England	DF	2005-2012	240	3	
Danny Hollands	England	MF	2006-2011	219	28	
Asmir Begović	Yugoslavia	GK	2007 2017-2021	122	0	
Josh McQuoid	England	FW	2007-2010 2012-2013	123	18	
Jason Pearce	England	DF	2007-2011	183	8	
Lee Bradbury	England	FW	2007-2011	146	12	
Marvin Bartley	England	MF	2007-2011	130	3	
Shwan Jalal	England	GK	2008-2013	171	0	
Liam Feeney	England	MF	2009-2011	121	14	
Anton Robinson	England	MF	2009-2011	117	10	
Adam Smith	England	DF	2010-2011 2014-	425	6	As of end of 2025-26 season
Marc Pugh	England	MF	2010-2019	312	56	
Harry Arter	England	MF	2010-2020	256	29	
Shaun MacDonnald	Wales	MF	2011-2016	101	6	
Charlie Daniels	England	DF	2011-2019	265	17	
Simon Francis	England	DF	2011-2020	324	3	
Steve Cook	England	DF	2011-2021	388	21	
Lewis Grabban	England	FW	2012-2014 2016-2017	115	36	
Tommy Elphick	England	DF	2012-2016	145	6	
Eunan O'Kane	Northern Ireland	MF	2012-2016	118	6	
Matt Ritchie	England	MF	2013-2016	142	31	
Ryan Fraser	Scotland	MF	2013-2020	208	24	
Artur Boruc	Poland	GK	2014-2019	129	0	
Callum Wilson	England	FW	2014-2020	187	67	
Dan Gosling	England	MF	2014-2021	192	22	
Junior Stanislas	England	MF	2014-2022	179	38	
Josh King	Norway	FW	2015-2021	184	53	
Nathan Aké	Netherlands	DF	2016-2020	121	11	
Lewis Cook	England	MF	2016-	277	3	As of end of 2025-26 season
Jefferson Lerma	Colombia	MF	2018-2023	184	12	
David Brooks	England	MF	2018-	180	24	As of end of 2025-26 season
Dominic Solanke	England	FW	2019-2024	216	77	
Lloyd Kelly	England	DF	2019-2024	141	3	
Chris Mepham	England	DF	2019-2024	121	2	
Philip Billing	Denmark	MF	2019-2025	201	31	
Ryan Christie	Scotland	FW	2021-	177	10	As of end of 2025-26 season
Marcus Tavernier	England	MF	2022-	125	20	As of end of 2025-26 season
Marcos Senesi	Argentina	DF	2022-2026	128	6	
Antione Semenyo	Ghana	FW	2022-2026	110	32	
