= 1981–82 AFC Bournemouth season =

AFC Bournemouth
1981–82 season
- Manager: David Webb **Until February 1982**
- Stadium: Dean Court
- Fourth Division: 4th (Promoted)
- FA Cup: Third Round
- League Cup: First Round
- League Group Cup: First Round

During the 1981–82 English football season, AFC Bournemouth competed in the Football League Fourth Division.

== Final league table ==
Pos	Team	Pld	W	D	L	GF	GA	GD	Pts	Promotion
2	Bradford City (P)	46	26	13	7	88	45	+43	91	Promotion to the Third Division
3	Wigan Athletic (P)	46	26	13	7	80	46	+34	91	Promotion to the Third Division
4	Bournemouth (P)	46	23	19	4	62	30	+32	88	Promotion to the Third Division
5	Peterborough United	46	24	10	12	71	57	+14	82	
6	Colchester United	46	20	12	14	82	57	+25	72	

(P) Promoted

== Results ==
Bournemouth's score comes first

=== Legend ===
Win	Draw	Loss

=== Football League Fourth Division ===
Date	Opponent	Venue	Result	Attendance
29 August 1981	Crewe Alexandra	H	2–0	3,244
5 September 1981	Mansfield Town	A	1–0	2,950
12 September 1981	Darlington	H	2–0	3,900
19 September 1981	Halifax Town	A	1–1	1,588
22 September 1981	York City	A	1–0	2,252
26 September 1981	Rochdale	H	1–0	5,146
29 September 1981	Wigan Athletic	H	0–0	4,952
3 October 1981	Stockport County	A	2–1	2,718
10 October 1981	Northampton Town	H	1–1	5,241
17 October 1981	Peterborough United	A	0–1	4,673
20 October 1981	Aldershot	A	0–2	3,704
24 October 1981	Bury	H	3–2	4,894
31 October 1981	Tranmere Rovers	A	1–0	1,730
3 November 1981	Scunthorpe United	H	2–0	5,032
7 November 1981	Port Vale	H	1–1	5,798
14 November 1981	Blackpool	A	3–0	4,665
28 November 1981	Sheffield United	H	0–0	9,855
5 December 1981	Hartlepool United	A	1–1	1,763
26 December 1981	Colchester United	H	1–1	8,829
28 December 1982	Torquay United	A	2–1	2,791
23 January 1982	Crewe Alexandra	A	0–0	1,597
30 January 1982	Halifax Town	H	1–1	4,690
2 February 1982	Bradford City	H	0–2	5,084
6 February 1982	Darlington	A	1–0	2,443
9 February 1982	York City	H	5–1	4,373
13 February 1982	Stockport County	A	1–0	5,628
20 February 1982	Rochdale	A	1–0	1,295
23 February 1982	Mansfield Town	H	1–0	5,725
27 February 1982	Northampton Town	A	0–1	2,125
6 March 1982	Peterborough United	H	1–1	7,351
9 March 1982	Aldershot	H	2–2	5,333
13 March 1982	Bury	A	2–2	4,087
16 March 1982	Scunthorpe United	A	2–0	1,441
20 March 1982	Tranmere Rovers	H	1–1	5,302
27 March 1982	Port Vale	A	1–1	3,004
31 March 1982	Hereford United	A	2–1	3,145
3 April 1982	Blackpool	H	1–0	5,146
10 April 1982	Colchester United	A	2–1	2,662
13 April 1982	Torquay United	H	4–0	6,398
17 April 1982	Hartlepool United	H	5–1	6,567
24 April 1983	Sheffield United	A	0–0	18,593
1 May 1982	Hull City	H	1–0	8,055
4 May 1982	Wigan Athletic	A	0–0	9,021
8 May 1982	Bradford City	A	2–2	9,768
11 May 1982	Hull City	A	0–0	3,387
15 May 1982	Hereford United	H	1–1	

=== FA Cup ===
Round	Date	Opponent	Venue	Result
R1	20 November 1981	Reading	H	1–0
R2	12 December 1981	Dorchester Town	A	1–1
R2R	15 December 1981	Dorchester Town	H	2–1
R3	2 January 1982	Oxford United	H	0–2

=== League Cup ===
Round	Date	Opponent	Venue	Result	Notes
R1 1st Leg	1 September 1981	Fulham	H	0–1	
R1 2nd Leg	15 September 1981	Fulham	A	0–2	Fulham won 3–0 on aggregate

=== Football League Group Cup ===
Round	Date	Opponent	Venue	Result	Attendance
R1	15 August 1981	Plymouth Argyle	A	0–0	2,707
R1	18 August 1981	Torquay United	H	1–1	2,519
R1	22 August 1981	Newport County	H	1–1	2,511

== Squad ==
Note: Flags indicate national team as defined under FIFA eligibility rules; some limited exceptions apply. Players may hold more than one non-FIFA nationality.

Pos.	Nation	Player
GK	ENG	Ian Leigh
GK	ENG	Kenny Allen
DF	ENG	Phil Brignull
DF	ENG	Paul Compton
DF	ENG	John Impey
DF	ENG	David Webb
DF	SCO	Brian O'Donnell
DF	ENG	Derek Dawkins
DF	ENG	Chris Sulley
DF	ENG	Tom Heffernan
MF	ENG	Steve Carter
MF	ENG	Kevin Dawtry

Pos.	Nation	Player
MF	ENG	Milton Graham
MF	SCO	Eddie Kelly
MF	ENG	Brian Smith
MF	ENG	Nigel Spackman
MF	ENG	Keith Williams
MF	ENG	Paul Edmunds
FW	ENG	Andy Crawford
FW	ENG	Tony Funnell
FW	ENG	Charlie George
FW	ENG	Howard Goddard
FW	ENG	Dean Mooney
FW	ENG	Trevor Morgan
