= 1980–81 AFC Bournemouth season =

Bournemouth
1980–81 season
- Manager: David Webb
- Stadium: Dean Court
- Fourth Division: 13th
- FA Cup: Second Round
- League Cup: First Round

During the 1980–81 English football season, AFC Bournemouth competed in the Football League Fourth Division.

== Final league table ==
Pos	Team	Pld	W	D	L	GF	GA	GD	Pts
11	Wigan Athletic	46	18	11	17	51	55	−4	47
12	Bury	46	17	11	18	70	62	+8	45
13	Bournemouth	46	16	13	17	47	48	−1	45
14	Bradford City	46	14	16	16	53	60	−7	44
15	Rochdale	46	14	15	17	60	70	−10	43

== Results ==
Bournemouth's score comes first

=== Legend ===
Win	Draw	Loss

=== Football League Fourth Division ===
Date	Opponent	Venue	Result	Attendance
16 August 1980	York City	A	0–4	2,195
19 August 1980	Hereford United	H	1–0	2,991
23 August 1980	Northampton Town	H	0–0	2,875
30 August 1980	Torquay United	A	0–2	2,640
6 September 1980	Bradford City	A	1–1	3,389
13 September 1980	Tranmere Rovers	H	1–0	2,642
16 September 1980	Hartlepool United	H	1–0	2,413
20 September 1980	Peterborough United	A	0–1	3,774
27 September 1980	Rochdale	H	2–1	2,557
30 September 1980	Hartlepool United	A	0–1	2,419
4 October 1980	Scunthorpe United	H	2–2	3,079
7 October 1980	Aldershot	A	0–0	3,780
11 October 1980	Darlington	A	2–1	2,363
18 October 1980	Mansfield Town	H	1–2	5,032
21 October 1980	Crewe Alexandra	H	0–0	2,632
24 October 1980	Stockport County	A	1–2	2,012
27 October 1980	Port Vale	A	2–0	3,009
1 November 1980	Wigan Athletic	H	3–0	2,983
4 November 1980	Aldershot	H	0–2	3,477
8 November 1980	Bury	A	0–3	2,202
12 November 1980	Hereford United	A	0–1	1,640
15 November 1980	York City	H	1–1	2,203
29 November 1980	Halifax Town	A	2–1	987
6 December 1980	Doncaster Rovers	H	1–2	2,495
20 December 1980	Lincoln City	A	0–2	3,391
26 December 1980	Southend United	H	2–1	4,381
27 December 1980	Wimbledon	A	0–2	2,681
3 January 1981	Stockport County	H	0–1	2,822
10 January 1981	Crewe Alexandra	A	2–0	3,087
17 January 1981	Halifax Town	H	2–1	2,413
24 January 1981	Torquay United	H	1–1	3,256
31 January 1981	Northampton Town	A	1–0	2,140
6 February 1981	Tranmere Rovers	A	1–0	2,480
14 February 1981	Bradford City	H	4–0	3,561
21 February 1981	Rochdale	A	0–0	1,846
28 February 1981	Peterborough United	H	4–1	5,334
6 March 1981	Scunthorpe United	A	1–1	2,519
14 March 1981	Darlington	H	3–3	4,995
21 March 1981	Mansfield Town	A	1–1	2,596
28 March 1981	Port Vale	H	0–0	4,665
4 April 1981	Wigan Athletic	A	1–0	3,750
11 April 1981	Bury	H	2–2	4,204
17 April 1981	Southend United	A	1–2	7,355
18 April 1981	Wimbledon	H	0–1	5,048
25 April 1981	Lincoln City	H	0–1	3,542
2 May 1981	Doncaster Rovers	A	1–2	11,373

Round	Date	Opponent	Venue	Result
R1	22 November 1980	Wycombe Wanderers	A	3–0
R2	13 December 1980	Charlton Athletic	A	1–2

=== League Cup ===
Round	Date	Opponent	Venue	Result	Notes
R1 1st Leg	9 August 1980	Swindon Town	H	1–1	
R1 2nd Leg	12 August 1980	Swindon Town	A	0–2	Swindon Town won 3–1 on aggregate

== Squad ==
Note: Flags indicate national team as defined under FIFA eligibility rules; some limited exceptions apply. Players may hold more than one non-FIFA nationality.

Pos.	Nation	Player
GK	ENG	John Smeulders
GK	ENG	Kenny Allen
DF	ENG	Paul Compton
DF	ENG	John Impey
DF	ENG	David Webb
DF	ENG	Neil Townsend
DF	ENG	Geoff Butler
DF	WAL	Jon Moore
DF	ENG	Chris Sulley
DF	ENG	Phil Ferns
DF	ENG	Tom Heffernan
DF	ENG	Ian Cunningham
MF	ENG	Danny Bailey

Pos.	Nation	Player
MF	ENG	Brian Chambers
MF	ENG	Kevin Dawtry
MF	ENG	Billy Elliott
MF	ENG	John Evanson
MF	ENG	Martin McGrath
MF	ENG	Gary Pugh
MF	ENG	Brian Smith
MF	ENG	Nigel Spackman
MF	ENG	Alan Whittle
FW	ENG	Steve Massey
FW	ENG	Dean Mooney
FW	ENG	Trevor Morgan
FW	ENG	Neil Prosser
FW	ENG	Eddie Prudham
