= 1988 Football League Fourth Division play-off final =

Association football match

- Event: 1987–88 Football League Fourth Division
Swansea City	Torquay United
5	4
- on aggregate

First leg
Swansea City	Torquay United
2	1
- Date: 25 May 1988
- Venue: Vetch Field, Swansea
- Referee: Roger Milford
- Attendance: 10,825

Second leg
Torquay United	Swansea City
3	3
- Date: 28 May 1988
- Venue: Plainmoor, Torquay
- Referee: J Martin
- Attendance: 5,000

The 1988 Football League Fourth Division play-off final was an association football match contested by Swansea City and Torquay United over two legs on 25 and 28 May 1988, to determine which club would play the following season in the Third Division. Torquay United had finished in fifth place in the Fourth Division while Swansea City finished sixth. They were joined in the play-offs by fourth-placed Scunthorpe United and Rotherham United, who had finished in 21st place in the division above. Swansea City defeated Rotherham United County in their semi-final, consigning the latter to relegation to the Fourth Division, while Torquay United beat Scunthorpe United in the other.

The play-off final first leg was played at Swansea City's Vetch Field, in front of a crowd of 10,825, and was refereed by Roger Milford. The first half ended goalless and Swansea City took the lead when McCarthy scored with a header in the 73rd minute. Ian Love doubled their advantage thirteen minutes later, again with a header. With two minutes remaining, Torquay United's Jim McNichol scored to end the game 2–1 to Swansea City. The second leg of the final was played at Plainmoor in Torquay on 28 May 1988 in front of 5,000 spectators and was refereed by J. Martin. In the 22nd minute, Paul Raynor gave Swansea City the lead and five minutes later McCarthy scored a penalty kick. McNichol then scored with two headers in the space of six minutes, but just before half-time, Alan Davies struck the ball past Kenny Allen, the Torquay United goalkeeper. In the 65th minute, David Caldwell scored at the near post, and the match ended 3–3 with Swansea City winning the final 5–4 on aggregate to secure promotion to the Third Division.

Swansea City's next season saw them finish in twelfth place in the Third Division, eleven points outside the 1989 Football League play-offs. Torquay United ended the following season in fourteenth position in the Fourth Division, twelve points below the play-offs.

== Route to the final ==
Football League Third Division final table, relegation positions
Pos	Team	Pld	W	D	L	GF	GA	GD	Pts
21	Rotherham United	46	12	16	18	50	66	−16	52
22	Grimsby Town	46	12	14	20	48	58	−10	50
23	York City	46	8	9	29	48	91	−43	33
24	Doncaster Rovers	46	8	9	29	40	84	−44	33

Football League Fourth Division final table, leading positions
Pos	Team	Pld	W	D	L	GF	GA	GD	Pts
1	Wolverhampton Wanderers	46	27	9	10	82	43	+39	90
2	Cardiff City	46	24	13	9	66	41	+25	85
3	Bolton Wanderers	46	22	12	12	66	42	+24	78
4	Scunthorpe United	46	20	17	9	76	51	+25	77
5	Torquay United	46	21	14	11	66	41	+25	77
6	Swansea City	46	20	10	16	62	56	+6	70

This was the second time the Football League play-offs had taken place. They were introduced in the previous season as part of the "Heathrow Agreement", a ten-point proposal to restructure the Football League. For the first two years of the play-offs, the team which had finished immediately above the relegation positions in the Third Division competed with three clubs from the Fourth Division for a place in the third tier of English football for the following season.

Swansea City finished the season in sixth place in the Fourth Division, and faced Rotherham United, who had finished 21st in the Third Division in their play-off semi-final. The first match of the two-legged tie took place at the Vetch Field in Swansea on 15 May 1988 in front of 9,148 spectators. After a goalless first half, Sean McCarthy scored with five minutes of the match remaining to give Swansea City a 1–0 victory. The second leg was held three days later at Millmoor in Rotherham in front of a crowd of 5,568. McCarthy scored with a volley after 19 minutes before Rotherham United's Nigel Johnson equalised with a goal before half-time. Although Rotherham United dominated the second half, the match ended 1–1. Swansea City progressed to the final with a 2–1 aggregate victory while Rotherham United were relegated to the fourth tier of English football for the first time since 1975.

Torquay United had finished second-from-last in the 1986–87 Fourth Division, only avoiding relegation by scoring a final minute penalty kick in their final game of the season. Going into the final match of the 1987–88 season, Torquay United were in third and played Scunthorpe United, only needing a draw to secure automatic promotion. Torquay United lost the game 2–1, and ended the season in fifth position, behind Scunthorpe United. Torquay United thus faced Scunthorpe United in the other play-off semi-final, with the first leg being played eight days after their final league encounter, again at Plainmoor in Torquay, on 15 May 1988, in front of 4,602 spectators. Scunthorpe were reduced to ten players when Paul Nicol was sent off. David Caldwell and Paul Dobson put Torquay United 2–0 ahead in the first half, before Kevin Taylor scored in the 71st minute to make the final score 2–1 to Torquay United. The second leg was held three days later at the Old Show Ground in Scunthorpe which was hosting its final game, in front of a crowd of 4,602. Mark Loram opened the scoring from a Dobson pass for Torquay United despite Scunthorpe dominating the early stages of the match. Steve Lister scored a late penalty for Scunthorpe United, but the match ended 1–1 and Torquay United progressed to the final with a 3–2 aggregate win.

== Match ==
=== Background ===
Torquay United had played in the Fourth Division since being relegated in the 1971–72 season and had avoided relegation to the Football Conference the previous season on goal difference. This was their first appearance in the play-offs. Swansea City had played in the fourth tier of English football for two seasons, and had featured in the First Division as recently as the 1982–83 season, before suffering three relegations in four seasons. In the matches between the sides during the regular season, the game at the Vetch Field in December 1987 ended in a 1–1 draw while the fixture at Plainmoor the following March saw Swansea City win 1–0.

=== First leg ===
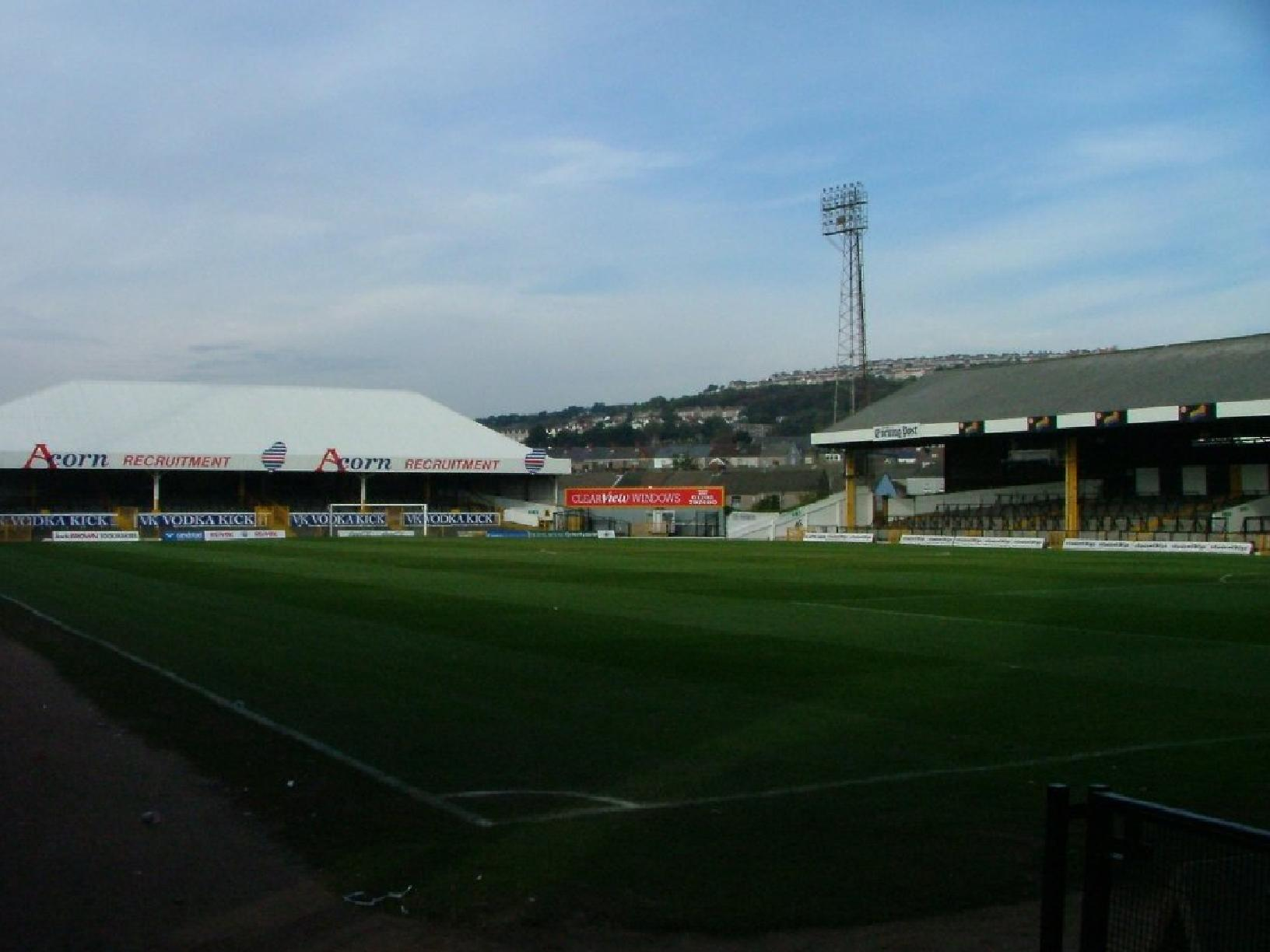
The first leg of the final took place at the Vetch Field in Swansea (pictured in 2006).

==== Summary ====
The play-off final first leg was played at Swansea City's Vetch Field, in front of a crowd of 10,825, and was refereed by Roger Milford. Swansea were the stronger team in the early minutes, and won an attacking free kick, which was taken by Robbie James. Andy Melville had a headed chance at goal from the free kick, but did not score. According to The Guardian's Grahame Lloyd, "Torquay always threatened to score on the break", and they had two opportunities to score in five minutes through Derek Dawkins. First, he had a headed shot from a cross by Tom Kelly, and then a shot from 12 yards (11 m), both saved by the Swansea goalkeeper, Peter Guthrie. The first half ended goalless and soon after the interval, Dobson's strike hit the Swansea City crossbar. McCarthy scored with a header in the 73rd minute to give Swansea City the lead before Ian Love doubled their advantage thirteen minutes later, again with a header. With two minutes remaining, Torquay United's Jim McNichol scored to end the game 2–1 to Swansea City.

==== Details ====
25 May 1988	Swansea City	2–1	Torquay United	Vetch Field, Swansea
	McCarthy 73'; Love 86'	Report	McNichol 88'	Attendance: 10,825; Referee: Roger Milford

GK	1	Peter Guthrie
RB	2	Chris Harrison
CB	3	Chris Coleman
CB	4	Andy Melville
LB	5	Alan Knill
RM	6	Robbie James
CM	7	Alan Davies
CM	8	Peter Bodak (substituted off)
LM	9	Sean McCarthy
CF	10	Paul Raynor	Booked
CF	11	Tommy Hutchison
Substitutes:
FW	12	Ian Love (substituted in)
Manager:
Terry Yorath

GK	1	Kenny Allen
RB	2	Jim McNichol
CB	3	Tom Kelly
CB	4	Sean Haslegrave
LB	5	David Cole
RM	6	John Impey
CM	7	Derek Dawkins
CM	8	Phil Lloyd	Booked
FW	9	Mark Loram (substituted off)
FW	10	Paul Dobson
LM	11	Roger Gibbins (substituted off)
Substitutes:
FW	12	David Caldwell (substituted in)
MF	13	Mark Gardiner (substituted in)
Manager:
Cyril Knowles

=== Second leg ===
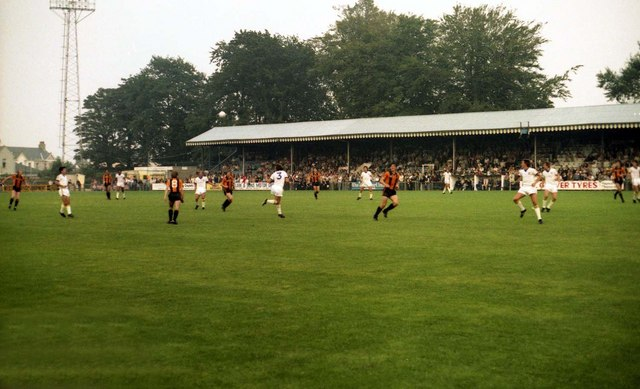
The second leg of the final was played at Plainmoor (pictured in 1982).

==== Summary ====
The second leg of the final was played at Plainmoor on 28 May 1988 in front of 5,000 spectators and was refereed by J. Martin. In the 22nd minute, Paul Raynor gave Swansea City the lead when he scored from missed clearances by Torquay United. Five minutes later, Love was pulled down in the Torquay United penalty area and McCarthy scored the resulting penalty kick. McNichol then scored with two headers in the space of six minutes, but just before half-time, Alan Davies struck the ball past Kenny Allen, the Torquay United goalkeeper, to make it 3–2 to Swansea City at the interval. In the second half, Torquay United went close to scoring twice more, with Caldwell shooting off-target from close range and McNichol heading the ball against the Swansea City crossbar. In the 65th minute, Caldwell scored at the near post, flicking the ball with his head past Guthrie. The match ended 3–3 and Swansea City won the final 5–4 on aggregate to secure promotion to the Third Division.

==== Details ====
28 May 1988	Torquay United	3–3 (4–5 agg.)	Swansea City	Plainmoor, Torquay
	McNichol 33', 39'; Caldwell 65'	Report	Raynor 22'; McCarthy 27' (pen.); Davies 45'	Attendance: 5,000; Referee: J. Martin

GK	1	Kenny Allen
RB	2	Jim McNichol
LB	3	Tom Kelly
RM	4	Derek Dawkins
CB	5	David Cole
CB	6	John Impey (substituted off)
FW	7	David Caldwell
CM	8	Phil Lloyd
CM	9	Mark Loram
FW	10	Paul Dobson
LM	11	Roger Gibbins
Substitutes:
FW	12	Lee Sharpe (substituted in)
Manager:
Cyril Knowles

GK	1	Peter Guthrie
RB	2	Chris Harrison
CB	3	Chris Coleman
CB	4	Andy Melville
LB	5	Alan Knill
RM	6	Robbie James
CM	7	Alan Davies
CM	8	Ian Love
LM	9	Sean McCarthy
CF	10	Paul Raynor
CF	11	Tommy Hutchison (substituted off)
Manager:
MF	12	John Lewis (substituted in)
Terry Yorath

== Post-match ==
Terry Yorath, Swansea City's manager, offered condolences to his opponents, saying "I've got all the sympathy in the world for them". His counterpart, Cyril Knowles, was critical of the play-offs, suggesting "it's all wrong. I don't like it, whatever the financial considerations, and I'm not saying that because we lost."

Swansea City's next season saw them finish in twelfth place in the Third Division, eleven points outside the 1989 Football League play-offs. Torquay United ended the following season in fourteenth position in the Fourth Division, twelve points below the play-offs.
