= 1984–85 AFC Bournemouth season =

Bournemouth
1984–85 season
- Manager: Harry Redknapp
- Stadium: Dean Court
- Third Division: 10th
- FA Cup: Third Round
- League Cup: First Round
- Football League Trophy: Southern Section Semi Final

During the 1984–85 English football season, AFC Bournemouth competed in the Football League Third Division.

== Final league table ==
Pos	Team	Pld	W	D	L	GF	GA	GD	Pts
8	York City	46	20	9	17	70	57	+13	69
9	Reading	46	19	12	15	68	62	+6	69
10	Bournemouth	46	19	11	16	57	46	+11	68
11	Walsall	46	18	13	15	58	52	+6	67
12	Rotherham United	46	18	11	17	55	55	0	65

== Results ==
Bournemouth's score comes first

=== Legend ===
Win	Draw	Loss

=== Football League Third Division ===
Date	Opponent	Venue	Result	Attendance
25 August 1984	Derby County	H	1–0	7,794
1 September 1984	Hull City	A	0–3	5,328
8 September 1984	Rotherham United	H	3–0	3,106
15 September 1984	Plymouth Argyle	A	0–0	4,933
18 September 1984	Newport County	A	1–1	2,338
22 September 1984	Doncaster Rovers	H	1–3	3,662
29 September 1984	Bristol Rovers	A	0–1	5,216
2 October 1984	Swansea City	A	0–2	2,847
6 October 1984	Burnley	H	1–1	3,180
13 October 1984	Bolton Wanderers	A	1–2	4,651
20 October 1984	Lincoln City	A	0–0	2,344
23 October 1984	York City	H	4–0	2,987
27 October 1984	Preston North End	H	2–0	3,509
3 November 1984	Reading	A	2–0	4,193
6 November 1984	Wigan Athletic	H	1–0	3,276
10 November 1984	Walsall	A	0–0	4,519
24 November 1984	Brentford	H	1–0	4,113
1 December 1984	Bradford City	A	2–4	5,578
15 December 1984	Bristol City	H	2–1	4,987
21 December 1984	Orient	H	1–0	3,709
26 December 1984	Cambridge United	A	0–1	2,158
29 December 1984	Millwall	A	1–2	5,000
1 January 1985	Gillingham	H	1–0	5,305
12 January 1985	Hull City	H	1–1	4,454
19 January 1985	Rotherham United	A	0–1	4,468
26 January 1985	Plymouth Argyle	H	1–0	3,695
30 January 1985	Derby County	A	3–2	9,181
2 February 1985	Bristol Rovers	H	1–0	5,167
9 February 1985	Doncaster Rovers	A	0–3	2,338
12 February 1985	Swansea City	A	0–0	4,121
23 February 1985	Reading	H	0–3	5,115
2 March 1985	Preston North End	A	1–2	2,991
5 March 1985	York City	A	1–4	4,532
9 March 1985	Lincoln City	H	3–1	2,955
16 March 1985	Bolton Wanderers	H	4–0	2,715
23 March 1985	Burnley	A	1–1	2,655
30 March 1985	Wigan Athletic	A	2–1	2,402
6 April 1985	Cambridge United	H	0–0	3,716
9 April 1985	Gillingham	A	2–3	5,257
13 April 1985	Walsall	H	4–1	2,554
20 April 1985	Brentford	A	0–0	3,599
26 April 1985	Bradford City	H	4–1	3,827
4 May 1985	Bristol City	A	0–2	7,083
8 May 1985	Millwall	H	1–2	2,954
11 May 1985	Orient	A	0–0	3,570
13 May 1985	Newport County	H	3–0	2,511

=== FA Cup ===
Round	Date	Opponent	Venue	Result
R1	17 November 1984	Kettering Town	A	0–0
R1R	20 November 1984	Kettering Town	H	3–2
R2	8 December 1984	Dartford	A	1–1
R2R	11 December 1984	Dartford	H	4–1
R3	5 January 1985	Manchester United	A	0–3

=== League Cup ===
Round	Date	Opponent	Venue	Result	Notes
R1 1st Leg	28 August 1984	Aldershot	A	0–4	
R1 2nd Leg	4 September 1984	Aldershot	H	0–1	Aldershot won 5–0 on aggregate

=== Football League Trophy ===
Round	Date	Opponent	Venue	Result	Attendance	Notes
R1 1st Leg	23 January 1985	Plymouth Argyle	A	1–2	2,995	
R1 2nd Leg	5 February 1985	Plymouth Argyle	H	2–0	2,748	Bournemouth won 3–2 on aggregate
R2	19 February 1985	Torquay United	H	2–1	2,637	
SQF	18 April 1985	Walsall	H	2–1	2,567	
SSF	30 April 1985	Brentford	H	2–3	4,657	

== Squad ==
Note: Flags indicate national team as defined under FIFA eligibility rules; some limited exceptions apply. Players may hold more than one non-FIFA nationality.

Pos.	Nation	Player
GK	ENG	Ian Leigh
GK	ENG	John Smeulders
DF	ENG	Phil Brignull
DF	ENG	Roger Brown
DF	ENG	Billy Clark
DF	ENG	Mark Nightingale
DF	ENG	Everald La Ronde
DF	ENG	Paul Morrell
DF	ENG	Chris Sulley
MF	ENG	Keith Williams
MF	ENG	Mark Schiavi

Pos.	Nation	Player
MF	ENG	John Beck
MF	ENG	Milton Graham
MF	IRL	Gary Howlett
MF	ENG	Morgan Lewis
MF	ENG	Robbie Savage
MF	ENG	Chris Shaw
MF	IRL	Sean O'Driscoll
FW	ENG	Steve Claridge
FW	SCO	Billy Rafferty
FW	ENG	Colin Russell
FW	ENG	Ian Thompson
