= 1985–86 AFC Bournemouth season =

Bournemouth
1985–86 season
- Manager: Harry Redknapp
- Stadium: Dean Court
- Third Division: 15th
- FA Cup: Third Round
- League Cup: Second Round
- Football League Trophy: Preliminary Round

During the 1985–86 English football season, AFC Bournemouth competed in the Football League Third Division.

== Final league table ==
Pos	Team	Pld	W	D	L	GF	GA	GD	Pts
13	Darlington	46	15	13	18	61	78	−17	58
14	Rotherham United	46	15	12	19	61	59	+2	57
15	Bournemouth	46	15	9	22	65	72	−7	54
16	Bristol Rovers	46	14	12	20	51	75	−24	54
17	Chesterfield	46	13	14	19	61	64	−3	53

== Results ==
Bournemouth's score comes first

=== Legend ===
Win	Draw	Loss

=== Football League Third Division ===
Date	Opponent	Venue	Result	Attendance
17 August 1985	Derby County	A	0–3	11,324
24 August 1985	Bristol City	H	5–0	4,969
26 August 1985	Brentford	A	0–1	4,283
31 August 1985	Newport County	H	0–1	3,387
7 September 1985	Chesterfield	H	1–0	3,207
14 September 1985	Notts County	A	0–0	4,235
17 September 1985	Blackpool	H	1–4	3,039
21 September 1985	Wigan Athletic	A	0–3	3,057
28 September 1985	Darlington	H	4–2	2,775
2 October 1985	Lincoln City	A	2–3	1,962
5 October 1985	Cardiff City	A	1–0	2,156
12 October 1985	Bury	H	2–1	3,122
19 October 1985	Gillingham	H	2–3	3,561
22 October 1985	York City	A	1–2	4,194
26 October 1985	Bristol Rovers	H	6–1	3,798
2 November 1985	Bolton Wanderers	A	0–1	3,800
5 November 1985	Plymouth Argyle	A	1–2	6,816
9 November 1985	Wolverhampton Wanderers	H	3–2	4,126
23 November 1985	Doncaster Rovers	A	1–1	2,390
14 December 1985	Walsall	A	2–4	4,460
17 December 1985	Rotherham United	H	1–2	2,489
21 December 1985	Bristol City	A	3–1	5,691
26 December 1985	Reading	H	0–1	6,105
28 December 1985	Brentford	H	0–0	4,006
1 January 1986	Swansea City	A	1–1	6,989
11 January 1986	Newport County	A	1–2	2,333
18 January 1986	Derby County	H	1–1	4,223
31 January 1986	Chesterfield	H	3–2	2,347
4 February 1986	York City	H	2–0	2,476
8 February 1986	Gillingham	A	0–2	3,895
22 February 1986	Wigan Athletic	H	0–2	2,949
1 March 1986	Darlington	A	0–0	2,576
4 March 1986	Lincoln City	H	2–2	1,873
8 March 1986	Cardiff City	H	1–1	2,707
15 March 1986	Bury	A	0–3	2,097
18 March 1986	Bolton Wanderers	H	2–1	2,063
22 March 1986	Bristol Rovers	A	3–2	3,296
29 March 1986	Swansea City	H	4–0	3,325
31 March 1986	Reading	A	2–1	7,342
5 April 1986	Plymouth Argyle	H	1–3	5,351
12 April 1986	Wolverhampton Wanderers	A	3–0	3,382
15 April 1986	Notts County	A	1–3	2,423
19 April 1986	Doncaster Rovers	H	1–1	2,799
26 April 1986	Rotherham United	A	1–4	2,107
29 April 1986	Blackpool	A	0–2	2,259
3 May 1986	Walsall	H	0–1	3,047

=== FA Cup ===
Round	Date	Opponent	Venue	Result
R1	16 November 1985	Dartford	H	0–0
R1R	19 November 1985	Dartford	A	2–0
R2	7 December 1985	Dagenham	H	4–1
R3	4 January 1986	Wigan Athletic	A	0–3

=== League Cup ===
Round	Date	Opponent	Venue	Result	Notes
R1 1st Leg	21 August 1985	Reading	A	3–1	
R1 2nd Leg	3 September 1985	Reading	H	2–0	Bournemouth won 5–1 on aggregate
R2 1st Leg	25 September 1985	Everton	A	2–3	
R2 2nd Leg	7 October 1985	Everton	H	0–2	Everton won 5–2 on aggregate

=== Football League Trophy ===
Round	Date	Opponent	Venue	Result	Attendance
PR	14 January 1986	Leyton Orient	A	1–3	947
PR	21 January 1986	Reading	H	5–0	1,974

== Squad ==
Note: Flags indicate national team as defined under FIFA eligibility rules; some limited exceptions apply. Players may hold more than one non-FIFA nationality.

Pos.	Nation	Player
GK	ENG	Ian Leigh
GK	ENG	John Smeulders
DF	ENG	Roger Brown
DF	ENG	Mark Newson
DF	ENG	Tony White
DF	ENG	Mark Nightingale
DF	ENG	Billy Clark
DF	ENG	David Coleman
DF	ENG	Paul Morrell
DF	ENG	Tom Heffernan
DF	ENG	Chris Sulley
MF	IRL	Gary Howlett

Pos.	Nation	Player
MF	IRL	Tommy Keane
MF	ENG	Morgan Lewis
MF	IRL	Mark O'Connor
MF	ENG	Adrian Randall
MF	ENG	Robbie Savage
MF	ENG	Keith Williams
MF	IRL	Sean O'Driscoll
MF	ENG	Chris Shaw
FW	NIR	Colin Clarke
FW	ENG	Steve Claridge
FW	ENG	Colin Russell
FW	ENG	Ian Thompson
