= List of AFC Bournemouth records and statistics =

== Honours ==
=== League titles ===
EFL Championship (second tier):

- Winners (1): 2014–15
- Runners-up (1): 2021–22

EFL League One/Division Three (third tier):

- Winners (1): 1986–87
- Runners-up (1): 2012–13

EFL League Two/Division Three/Division Four (fourth tier):

- Runners-up (2): 1970–71, 2009–10
- Play-off winners (1): 2002–03

Third Division South:

- Runners-up (1): 1947–48

Southern Football League:

- Runners-up (1): 1922–23

Hampshire League West:

- Winners (1): 1907–07
- Runners-up (2): 1903–04, 1907–08

Hampshire League:

- Runners-up (3): 1910–11, 1911–12, 1913–14

=== Cup titles ===
Associate Members' Cup:

- Winners (1): 1984

EFL Trophy

- Runners-up (1): 1998

== Club statistics ==
=== Matches ===
==== Wins ====
- Record league win: 8–0 vs Birmingham City, Championship, 25 October 2014
- Record cup win: 11–0 vs Margate, FA Cup, 20 November 1971

==== Losses ====
Record league loss:

- 0–9 vs Liverpool, Premier League, 27 August 2022.
- 0–9 vs Lincoln City, League One (Formerly Football League Third Division), 18 December 1982.

=== Divisional movements ===
Tier	Years	Last	Promotions	Relegations
First	10	2026–27	–	▼1 (2020)
Second	7	2021–22	▲2 (2022) (2015)	▼1 (1990)
Third	70	2012–13	▲2 (2013) (1987)	▼4 (1970) (1975) (2002) (2008)
Fourth	11	2009–10	▲4 (1971) (1982) (2003) (2010)	
Other	15	1922–23	▲1 (1923)	

== Player statistics ==
The following are club records since its establishment in 1899.

Only competitive, professional matches, as of November 2026

Players in bold still play for the club

=== Most appearances ===
Rank	Nat.	Player	Tenure	Apps	Position
1	(England)	Steve Fletcher	1992–2007; 2009–2013	726	FW
2	(England)	Neil Young	1994–2008	483	DF
3	(Republic of Ireland)	Sean O'Driscoll	1984–1995	441	MF
4	(England)	**Adam Smith**	2010–2011; 2014–	439	DF
5	(England)	Ray Bumstead	1958–1969	436	MF
6	(England)	James Hayter	1997–2007	407	FW
7	(England)	Keith Miller	1968–1979	398	DF
8	(Republic of Ireland)	Tommy Godwin	1952–1962	389	GK
9	(England)	Steve Cook	2011–2022	388	DF
10	(England)	Ron Eyre	1924–1933	378	FW

=== Top goalscorers ===
Rank	Nat.	Player	Tenure	Goals	Apps	Position	Goals per game
1	(England)	Ron Eyre	1924–1933	229	378	FW	0.61
2	(Scotland)	Ted MacDougall	1969–1972; 1978–1980	142	212	FW	0.67
3	(England)	Steve Fletcher	1992–2009; 2010–2013	122	726	FW	0.17
4	(England)	James Hayter	1997–2007	108	407	FW	0.27
5	(Jersey)	Brett Pitman	2005–2010; 2012–2015	102	301	FW	0.34
6	(England)	Dickie Dowsett	1957–1962	85	179	FW	0.47
7	(England)	Stan Newsham	1952–1957	78	152	FW	0.51
8	(England)	Dominic Solanke	2019–2024	77	216	FW	0.36
9	(England)	Doug McGibbon	1948–1951	68	111	FW	0.61
10	(England)	Jack Cross	1947–1953	67	173	FW	0.39

=== Transfers ===
==== Record transfer fees paid ====
Rank	Pos.	Player	Transferred from	Fee	Date	Ref.
1	FW	(Brazil) Evanilson	(Portugal) Porto	£40,200,000	August 2024	
2	CB	(France) Bafodé Diakité	(France) Lille	£34,600,000	August 2025	
3	FW	(Uruguay) Álvaro Rodríguez	(Spain) Elche	£25,700,000	July 2026	
3	CB	(Portugal) António Silva	(Portugal) Benfica	£25,700,000	August 2026	
5	LW	(Morocco) Amine Adli	(Germany) Bayer Leverkusen	£25,100,000	August 2025	
6	DM	(Colombia) Jefferson Lerma	(Spain) Levante	£25,000,000	August 2018	
6	CM	(England) Alex Scott	(England) Bristol City	£25,000,000	August 2023	
6	GK	(Serbia) Đorđe Petrović	(England) Chelsea	£25,000,000	July 2025	
6	RW	(Scotland) Ben Gannon-Doak	(England) Liverpool	£25,000,000	August 2025	
10	FW	(Brazil) Rayan	(Brazil) Vasco da Gama	£24,700,000	January 2026	

==== Record transfer fees received ====
Rank	Pos.	Player	Transferred to	Fee	Date	Ref.
1	FW	(England) Dominic Solanke	(England) Tottenham Hotspur	£65,000,000	August 2024	
2	RW	(Ghana) Antoine Semenyo	(England) Manchester City	£64,000,000	January 2026	
3	CB	(Ukraine) Illia Zabarnyi	(France) Paris Saint-Germain	£54,500,000	August 2025	
4	CB	(Spain) Dean Huijsen	(Spain) Real Madrid	£50,000,000	June 2025	
5	RW	(Burkina Faso) Dango Ouattara	(England) Brentford	£42,500,000	August 2025	
6	CB	(Netherlands) Nathan Aké	(England) Manchester City	£41,000,000	August 2020	
7	LB	(Hungary) Milos Kerkez	(England) Liverpool	£40,000,000	June 2025	
8	CB	(England) Tyrone Mings	(England) Aston Villa	£26,500,000	July 2019	
9	LW	(Netherlands) Arnaut Danjuma	(Spain) Villarreal	£21,300,000	August 2021	
10	FW	(England) Callum Wilson	(England) Newcastle United	£20,000,000	September 2020	
