= Frank Stringfellow =

Frank Stringfellow may refer to:

- Benjamin Franklin Stringfellow (1840–1913), Confederate spy known as Frank Stringfellow
- Frank Stringfellow (footballer) (1889–1948), English footballer
- Frank Stringfellow (actor), actor in original Broadway cast of Yellow Jack

== See also ==
- Benjamin Franklin Stringfellow (1816–1891)
