= Robert Bryce (disambiguation) =

Robert Bryce may refer to:

- Bob Bryce (1879-1958), Australian rules footballer
- Bob Bryce (footballer, born 1904) (1904-1970), Scottish footballer, see List of AFC Bournemouth players (25–99 appearances)
- Robert Bryce (1910-1997), Canadian civil servant
- Robert Bryce (writer) (born 1960), American author, film producer, and public speaker
