= 1984 Associate Members' Cup final =

1984 Associate Members' Cup Final
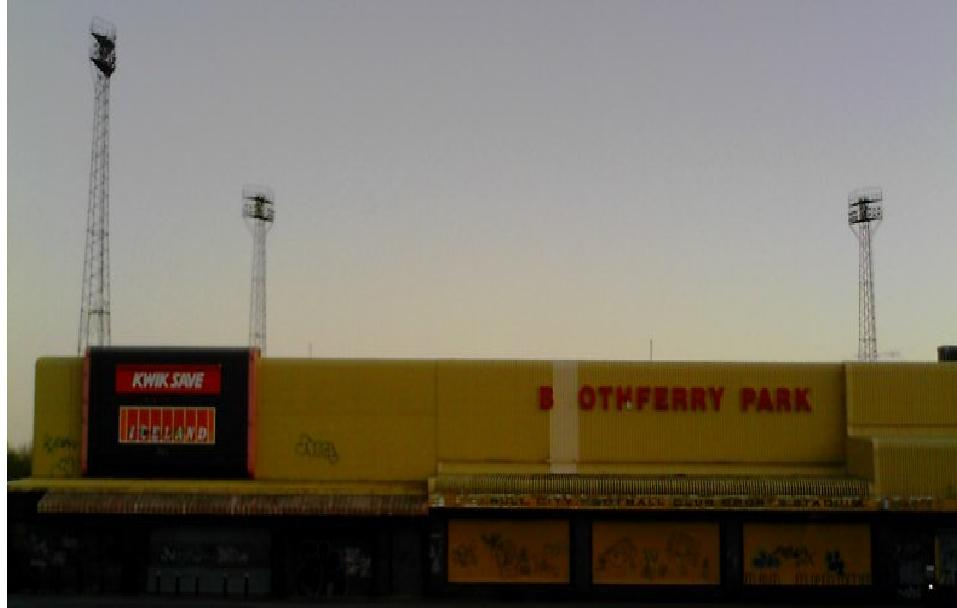
- Event: 1983–84 Associate Members' Cup
Hull City	Bournemouth
1	2
- Date: 24 May 1984
- Venue: Boothferry Park, Hull
- Attendance: 6,544

The 1984 Associate Members' Cup final was the final of the inaugural Associate Members' Cup. The match was held at Boothferry Park in Hull on 24 May 1984 and had an attendance of 6,544. It was contested by Hull City and Bournemouth.

Bournemouth won the match 2–1, with Paul Morrell scoring the winning goal.

== Background ==
After the Anglo-Scottish Cup was discontinued in 1981, the Football League created the Group Cup for the 1981–82 season to help fill the void left in the calendar. It was renamed the Football League Trophy for the following campaign, before a full rebrand and restructuring led to the Associate Members' Cup being introduced for the 1983–84 season. The format had been changed to a knock-out competition solely for clubs from the Third Division and Fourth Division. Previously, it had been an invitational 32-team tournament with a group stage and knock-out competition, with clubs from all four divisions competing.

When it came to the debut of the 1983–84 Associate Members' Cup, Hull City and Bournemouth were its eventual finalists. Hull had beaten York City, Bury, Preston North End, Sheffield United, and Tranmere Rovers en route to the final two. Meanwhile, Bournemouth had faced Aldershot, Millwall, Wrexham, Bristol Rovers, and Millwall again prior to their meeting with Hull.

As with nearly all Football League competitions, Wembley Stadium was originally meant to stage the final. However, due to the recent Horse of the Year Show the pitch had become unplayable. Instead, it was moved to Boothferry Park, the home of Hull City.

== Match details ==
24 May 1984
19:45 (BST)

Hull City	1–2	Bournemouth
McNeil 12'		Graham 27'; Morrell 73'

Boothferry Park, Hull
Attendance: 6,544
Referee: George Courtney (Spennymoor County Durham).

Hull City	Bournemouth

GK	1	(Wales) Tony Norman
RB	2	(Scotland) Bobby McNeil
CB	5	(England) Peter Skipper
CB	6	(Scotland) Stan McEwan
LB	3	(England) Gary Swann
RM	7	(England) Brian Marwood
CM	4	(England) Dale Roberts	Substituted off
CM	8	(England) Steve McClaren
LM	11	(England) Garreth Roberts (c)	Substituted off
CF	9	(England) Billy Whitehurst
CF	10	(England) Alan Taylor
Substitutes:
LM	12	(England) Billy Askew	Substituted on
CM	13	(England) Andy Flounders	Substituted on
Manager:
(England) Chris Chilton (interim manager)

GK	1	(England) Ian Leigh
RB	2	(England) Mark Nightingale
CB	5	(England) Roger Brown
CB	6	(England) Phil Brignull
LB	3	(England) Chris Sulley
RM	7	(Republic of Ireland) Sean O'Driscoll
CM	4	(England) John Beck
CM	8	(England) Robbie Savage
LM	10	(England) Paul Morrell (c)
CF	9	(England) Milton Graham
CF	11	(England) Ian Thompson
Substitutes:
CM	12	(England) Chris Shaw
CM	13	(England) Keith Williams
Manager:
(England) Harry Redknapp

MATCH RULES

- 90 minutes.
- 30 minutes of extra-time if necessary.
- Penalty shoot-out if scores still level.
- Two named substitutes
- Maximum of two substitutions.
