= David Brignull =

English cricketer (born 1981)

David Brignull (born 27 November 1981 in Forest Gate, London) is an English cricket player. He formerly played for Leicestershire until 2005 after progressing through their academy. Brignull is a medium-fast bowler who has represented his country at Under 19 level.

In 2006 he was signed by Shropshire in Minor Counties cricket. The following season he represented Cambridgeshire in Minor Counties cricket. He is the nephew of former professional footballer Phil Brignull.
