= Liam Brignull =

Welsh field hockey player

Personal information
- Born: 23 February 1993 (age 33) Cardiff, Wales

Sport
- Sport: Field hockey
- Position: Midfield
Senior career
Years	Team	Caps	Goals
–2011	Cheltenham	-	-
2011–2017	Cardiff & Met	-	-
National team
Years	Team	Caps	Goals
2012–2017	Wales	70	-

Liam Roy Brignull (born 23 February 1993) is a former field hockey player who represented Wales. He competed for Wales at the 2014 Commonwealth Games. His father is Phil Brignull.

== Biography ==
Brignull, born in Cardiff, Wales, was educated at Dean Close School and studied Cardiff Metropolitan University.

In 2014 he represented the Great Britain U23 team in Malaysia. and while at the university, he played club hockey for the Cardiff & Met Hockey Club and while at Cardiff & Met in 2014, he was selected to represent the Welsh team at the 2014 Commonwealth Games in Glasgow, Scotland in the men's tournament.

In 2017, he signed to play association football for Bishop's Cleeve F.C. and set up a mortgage business, where he works as a partner and adviser.
