= Ian Love =

Welsh footballer

Personal information
- Full name: Ian James Love
- Date of birth: 1 March 1958 (age 68)
- Place of birth: Cardiff, Wales
- Height: 5 ft 11 in (1.80 m)
- Position: Forward

Senior career*
Years	Team	Apps	(Gls)
1979–1982	Barry Town	100	(35)
1982–1984	Merthyr Tydfil		
1984–1986	Barry Town	34	(15)
1986–1989	Swansea City	41	(10)
1989	Torquay United	9	(0)
1989–1990	Cardiff City	2	(0)
1990–1991	Barry Town	46	(9)
- * Club domestic league appearances and goals

Ian James Love (born 1 March 1958) is a Welsh former professional footballer who played as a forward. He made 52 appearances in the Football League during spells with Swansea City, Torquay United and Cardiff City.

== Career ==
After playing local league football, Love joined Barry Town in 1979. In two spells with Barry and one with Merthyr Tydfil, he impressed enough to be offered a professional deal by Swansea City in 1986. He scored nine goals in 41 league appearances for the side. He also scored in the first leg of the 1988 Football League Fourth Division play-off final as Swansea won promotion to the Third Division.

He was sold to Torquay United for £2,000 in March 1989 but left the club soon after. He joined Cardiff City on non-contract terms, making two league appearances before returning to Barry Town.

== Honours ==
Swansea City

- Football League Fourth Division play-offs: 1988
