= Peter Monaghan =

Scottish footballer

Personal information
- Full name: Peter Monaghan
- Date of birth: 1917
- Place of birth: Stevenston, Scotland
- Date of death: 21 January 1945 (aged 27)
- Place of death: German-occupied Netherlands
- Position: Wing half

Senior career*
Years	Team	Apps	(Gls)
1936	Ardeer Recreation		
1937–1939	Bournemouth & Boscombe Athletic	71	(1)
1939–1940	Dundee United (guest)	2	(0)
- Kilmarnock (guest)
Total		73	(1)
- * Club domestic league appearances and goals

Peter Monaghan (1917 – 21 January 1945) was a Scottish professional footballer who played in the Football League for Bournemouth & Boscombe Athletic as a wing half.

== Personal life ==
Monaghan was married and served as a private in the Glasgow Highlanders of the Highland Light Infantry (City of Glasgow Regiment) during the Second World War. He was killed in the Netherlands on 21 January 1945 and was buried in Sittard War Cemetery.

== Career statistics ==
Appearances and goals by club, season and competition
Club	Season	League			National Cup		Total	
Club	Season	Division	Apps	Goals	Apps	Goals	Apps	Goals
Bournemouth & Boscombe Athletic	1937–38	Third Division South	33	0	3	0	36	0
Bournemouth & Boscombe Athletic	1938–39	Third Division South	32	1	3	0	35	1
Bournemouth & Boscombe Athletic	Total		65	1	6	0	71	1
Dundee United	1939–40	Eastern Regional	2	0	0	0	2	0
Career total			67	1	6	0	73	1
