= Dennis Coughlin (footballer) =

English footballer

Personal information
- Full name: Dennis Michael Coughlin
- Date of birth: 26 November 1937 (age 88)
- Place of birth: Houghton-le-Spring, England
- Position: Centre forward

Senior career*
Years	Team	Apps	(Gls)
- Shiney Row St Oswald's
- Durham City
1957–1960	Barnsley	0	(0)
1960–1963	Yeovil Town		
1963–1966	Bournemouth & Boscombe Athletic	88	(40)
1966–1968	Swansea Town	40	(10)
1968	→ Exeter City (loan)	13	(2)
- Chelmsford City
- King's Lynn
- Bedford Town
- South Shields
- * Club domestic league appearances and goals

Dennis Michael Coughlin (born 26 November 1937) is an English former footballer who played as a centre forward.

== Career ==
Coughlin began his career at Shiney Row St Oswald's, before moving on to Durham City. In 1957, Coughlin signed for Football League club Barnsley. Over the course of three years, Coughlin failed to make an appearance for Barnsley and moved to Yeovil Town. In March 1963, Coughlin moved back to the Football League, signing for Bournemouth & Boscombe Athletic. Coughlin made 88 appearances for the club, scoring 40 times. In August 1966, Coughlin signed for Swansea Town, in a deal that saw Ken Pound go the other way to Bournemouth. In March 1968, after ten goals in 40 league games for Swansea, Coughlin signed for Exeter City on loan. Coughlin scored two goals in 13 appearances for Exeter, returning to Non-League football with Chelmsford City ahead of the 1968–69 season. Coughlin later played for King's Lynn and Bedford Town, before returning to his native Tyne and Wear to play for South Shields.
