= Martin McGrath (footballer, born 1960) =

English footballer

Personal information
- Full name: Martin Laurence McGrath
- Date of birth: 15 October 1960 (age 66)
- Place of birth: Hendon, England
- Position: Midfielder

Youth career
- Chandlers Ford Rangers
- 1977–1978: Southampton

Senior career*
Years	Team	Apps	(Gls)
1978–1980	Southampton	1	(0)
1980–1981	AFC Bournemouth	22	(0)
1981–19??	Oxford City		

International career
1976	England Schoolboys	7	(1)
- * Club domestic league appearances and goals

Martin Laurence McGrath (born 15 October 1960) is an English former footballer who played as a midfielder for Southampton and AFC Bournemouth in the early 1980s.

== Playing career ==
McGrath was born in Hendon in north-west London but grew up in the Southampton area where he attended St Mary's College. Having played international schoolboy football for England, he was signed by Southampton as an apprentice in August 1977, turning professional on his 18th birthday in October 1978.

He played regularly for the reserves making 51 appearances with six goals. His only first-team appearance came on 8 March 1980 at Elland Road when he replaced Trevor Hebberd in the second half of a 2–0 defeat by Leeds United. In the summer of 1980, he was released and moved across the New Forest to spend a season with AFC Bournemouth, for whom he made 22 League appearances.

Before the end of the 1980–81 season, he had left the Cherries and briefly joined non-league Oxford City in the Isthmian League Division One. During his time at Oxford City, the club was managed by former England and West Ham United player Bobby Moore, assisted by Harry Redknapp.

== Later career ==
McGrath soon gave up football altogether and became a croupier and gaming inspector in the Ritz Club in London. From 1990, he was employed by British Airways at Heathrow Airport, firstly as a salesman and then in Customer Services looking after VIPs.

He moved to Normandy in 2005 from where he runs a website selling the Scuba brand of toothbrush.>

== Bibliography ==
- Chalk, Gary; Holley, Duncan; Bull, David (2013). All the Saints – A Complete Players' Who's Who of Southampton FC. Hagiology Publishing. ISBN 978-0-9926864-0-6.
- Holley, Duncan; Chalk, Gary (1992). The Alphabet of the Saints. ACL & Polar Publishing. ISBN 0-9514862-3-3.
- Holley, Duncan; Chalk, Gary (2003). In That Number – A Post-war Chronicle of Southampton FC. Hagiology Publishing. ISBN 0-9534474-3-X.
- Hugman, Barry (1981). Football League Players Records (1946–1981). Aylesbury: Rothmans Publications. ISBN 0-907574-08-4.
