= Jim McNichol =

Scottish footballer

Personal information
- Full name: James Anthony McNichol
- Date of birth: 9 June 1958 (age 68)
- Place of birth: Glasgow, Scotland
- Height: 6 ft 0 in (1.83 m)
- Position: Central defender

Youth career
- –1976: Ipswich Town

Senior career*
Years	Team	Apps	(Gls)
1976–1978	Luton Town	15	(0)
1978–1984	Brentford	155	(22)
1984–1986	Exeter City	87	(10)
1986–1989	Torquay United	124	(13)
1989–1991	Exeter City	42	(8)
1991–1992	Torquay United	2	(0)
- Torrington
Total		425	(53)

International career
1978–1980	Scotland U21	7	(0)
- * Club domestic league appearances and goals

James Anthony McNichol (born 9 June 1958) is a Scottish former professional footballer who is most noted for his career at Torquay United and Exeter City. He was capped by Scotland at U21 level.

== Playing career ==
An apprentice at Ipswich Town, McNichol joined Luton Town in July 1976. He later played for Brentford (his transfer setting a new club record incoming fee of £33,000), before moving on to Exeter City. In July 1986 he joined Torquay United. On 9 May 1987 Torquay were heading out of the Football League, 2–0, down to Crewe Alexandra at half-time in the last game of the season, they needed two more goals to ensure survival—McNichol, Paul Dobson and a German shepherd called Bryn saved the day for Torquay. McNichol scored from a free-kick, then in the dying moments ran to the corner flag to whip in a cross, little realizing his run would confuse the police dog into thinking he was about to attack his handler. The dog bit McNichol on the leg and the player had to be treated; during the minutes added on due to the injury, Dobson scored and Lincoln City were the ones to lose their league status on goal difference. The story of McNichol's injury was featured in the Netflix documentary series Losers.

McNichol was appointed captain and led the club to the Football League Trophy final in 1989, before returning to Exeter in August 1989. He helped City take the Football League Fourth Division title in 1989–90, before he made the switch from Exeter to Torquay a second time in July 1991. After leaving the Gulls he later played for Torrington. An ankle ligament injury ended his career.

== Personal life ==
After his retirement from football, McNichol settled in Exeter and became a publican, operating The Exeter Inn in Ashburton. He sold the pub just prior to the COVID-19 pandemic, after 33 years running in.

== Honours ==
Torquay United

- Associate Members' Cup runner-up: 1988–89

Exeter City

- Football League Fourth Division: 1989–90

Individual

- Brentford Supporters' Player of the Year: 1978–79
