= Chris Sulley =

English footballer (born 1959)

Personal information
- Full name: Christopher Stephen Sulley
- Date of birth: 3 December 1959 (age 66)
- Place of birth: Camberwell, England
- Height: 5 ft 9 in (1.75 m)
- Position: Left-back

Youth career
- 1976–1978: Chelsea

Senior career*
Years	Team	Apps	(Gls)
1978–1981	Chelsea	0	(0)
1981–1986	AFC Bournemouth	206	(3)
1986	Dundee United	7	(0)
1986–1992	Blackburn Rovers	134	(3)
1992–1993	Port Vale	40	(1)
1993–1994	Preston North End	21	(1)
Total		408	(8)

Managerial career
- 2000–2008: Bolton Wanderers Academy
- * Club domestic league appearances and goals

Christopher Stephen Sulley (born 3 December 1959) is an English former professional footballer who played as a left-back. He played 401 games in the Football League and seven games in the Scottish Football League.

He began his career at Chelsea in 1978, though he did not play a league game for the club, and instead joined AFC Bournemouth in 1981. After five years on the south coast, during which he was twice promoted and lifted the Associate Members' Cup, he signed with Blackburn Rovers via Dundee United. He won the Full Members' Cup with Rovers in 1987 and stayed for six years before moving on to Port Vale after Rovers won promotion to the top-flight in 1992. He switched to Preston North End the following year before retiring in 1994. During his career, he was involved in five play-off competitions, only one of which (Blackburn in 1992) ended in promotion.

== Playing career ==
Sulley began his career with Chelsea, but failed to make a senior appearance at Stamford Bridge under Danny Blanchflower or Geoff Hurst, as the "Pensioners" were relegated out of the First Division in 1978–79 and then remained in the Second Division in 1979–80 and 1980–81.

He moved on to Fourth Division side AFC Bournemouth in March 1981. David Webb's side won promotion to the Third Division after occupying the final promotion place in 1981–82. They maintained their third tier status in 1982–83 and 1983–84 as new manager Don Megson was quickly replaced by Harry Redknapp. Redknapp coached the club to victory in the 1984 Associate Members' Cup final, as they beat Hull City 2–1 at Boothferry Park. The "Cherries" continued to remain in the Third Division in 1984–85 and 1985–86, before they topped the division in 1986–87 after winning 19 of their 23 league games at Dean Court.

After making over 200 appearances for Bournemouth, he moved to Scotland to play for Dundee United in 1986. He featured only eight times for manager Jim McLean, including one appearance at the very beginning of the club's UEFA Cup run to the final and moved back to England within three months with Blackburn Rovers, converting a loan move into a £15,000 deal. He quickly built a left-sided partnership with Scott Sellars. He won the Full Members' Cup at Wembley in 1987, Colin Hendry scoring the only goal of the game against Charlton Athletic. Rovers finished the 1987–88 season in the Second Division play-off zone, but lost out to Sulley's former club Chelsea. The "Riversiders" again reached the play-offs in 1988–89, but were defeated by Crystal Palace in the final. Sulley lost his first-team place to John Millar but later regained it. A third-successive play-off appearance in 1989–90, this time Rovers lost to Swindon Town at the semi-final stage. After Rovers struggled in 1990–91 their manager Don Mackay departed. Bankrolled by Jack Walker, new manager Kenny Dalglish took the Lancashire club into the top-flight via the play-offs, as Rovers defeated Leicester City 1–0 in the final. In his six years with Blackburn, Sulley made close to 150 appearances before Alan Wright managed to make the left-back position his own.

Sulley moved to John Rudge's Port Vale in July 1992, and played 53 games in league and cup in 1992–93, though missed both the Football League Trophy and play-off finals at Wembley. He then left Vale Park and signed with John Beck's Preston North End on a free transfer in June 1993. The 1993–94 season would see one last play-off heartbreak for Sulley, as the "Lambs" lost 4–2 to Wycombe Wanderers in the final.

== Coaching career ==
After retiring in 1994, Sulley took up a coaching post with Preston North End at their centre of excellence in 1995. From there, he moved back to Blackburn Rovers and then on to Bolton Wanderers, originally as under-19s coach, in 1998. He left his position at Bolton in March 2008. In March 2011, Sulley was appointed as director of the Leeds United academy. He left the post in April 2012. In November 2013, he was appointed as joint Head of Coaching for the under-5s to under-13s at the Everton Academy. He was appointed as head of coaching at Burnley's academy in October 2016 and went on to work as an FA youth coach developer.

== Personal life ==
He married Sue and had two children.

== Career statistics ==
Appearances and goals by club, season and competition
Club	Season	League			FA Cup		Other		Total	
Club	Season	Division	Apps	Goals	Apps	Goals	Apps	Goals	Apps	Goals
Chelsea	1978–79	First Division	0	0	0	0	0	0	0	0
Chelsea	1979–80	Second Division	0	0	0	0	0	0	0	0
Chelsea	Total		0	0	0	0	0	0	0	0
AFC Bournemouth	1980–81	Fourth Division	8	0	0	0	0	0	8	0
AFC Bournemouth	1981–82	Fourth Division	46	0	4	0	5	0	55	0
AFC Bournemouth	1982–83	Third Division	46	1	1	0	5	0	52	1
AFC Bournemouth	1983–84	Third Division	46	2	5	0	8	0	59	2
AFC Bournemouth	1984–85	Third Division	23	0	4	0	4	0	31	0
AFC Bournemouth	1985–86	Third Division	37	0	4	0	6	0	47	0
AFC Bournemouth	Total		206	3	18	0	28	0	252	3
Blackburn Rovers	1986–87	Second Division	13	0	0	0	2	0	15	0
Blackburn Rovers	1987–88	Second Division	34	0	1	0	3	0	38	0
Blackburn Rovers	1988–89	Second Division	19	0	3	0	5	0	27	0
Blackburn Rovers	1989–90	Second Division	36	0	2	0	2	0	40	0
Blackburn Rovers	1990–91	Second Division	25	3	2	0	1	0	28	3
Blackburn Rovers	1991–92	Second Division	7	0	0	0	2	0	9	0
Blackburn Rovers	Total		134	3	8	0	15	0	157	3
Port Vale	1992–93	Second Division	40	1	4	0	7	0	51	1
Preston North End	1993–94	Third Division	21	1	0	0	3	0	24	1
Career total			401	8	30	0	53	0	484	8

== Honours ==
Bournemouth

- Associate Members' Cup: 1983–84

Blackburn Rovers

- Full Members' Cup: 1986–87
