= Reg Wright (footballer) =

English footballer

Personal information
- Full name: Reginald Wright
- Date of birth: 17 January 1901
- Place of birth: Dronfield, England
- Date of death: 1973 (aged 71–72)
- Position: Defender

Senior career*
Years	Team	Apps	(Gls)
1920–1921	Mosborough Trinity		
1921–1922	The Wednesday	0	(0)
1923–1924	Worksop Town		
1924–1928	Blackpool	43	(1)
1928–1931	Bournemouth & Boscombe Athletic	31	(0)
1931–1932	Chesterfield	11	(0)
1932–1933	Frickley Colliery		
1933–1934	Worksop Town		
1934–1935	Buxton		
1935	Mosborough Trinity		
Total		85	(1)
- * Club domestic league appearances and goals

Reginald Wright (17 January 1901 – 1973) was an English footballer who played in the Football League for Blackpool, Bournemouth & Boscombe Athletic and Chesterfield.
