= Ralph Miller (footballer) =

English footballer

Personal information
- Full name: Ralph Ernest Miller
- Date of birth: 22 June 1941
- Place of birth: Slough, England
- Date of death: September 2014 (aged 73)
- Place of death: Bournemouth, England
- Position: Defender

Senior career*
Years	Team	Apps	(Gls)
- Slough Town
1963–1965	Charlton Athletic	8	(0)
1965–1968	Gillingham	103	(4)
1968–?	Bournemouth & Boscombe Athletic	72	(1)
- Weymouth
- Poole Town
- Ringwood Town
- * Club domestic league appearances and goals

Ralph Ernest Miller (22 June 1941 – September 2014) was an English professional footballer. His clubs included Charlton Athletic, Bournemouth & Boscombe Athletic and Gillingham, where he made over 100 Football League appearances.
