= Neil Prosser =

English footballer

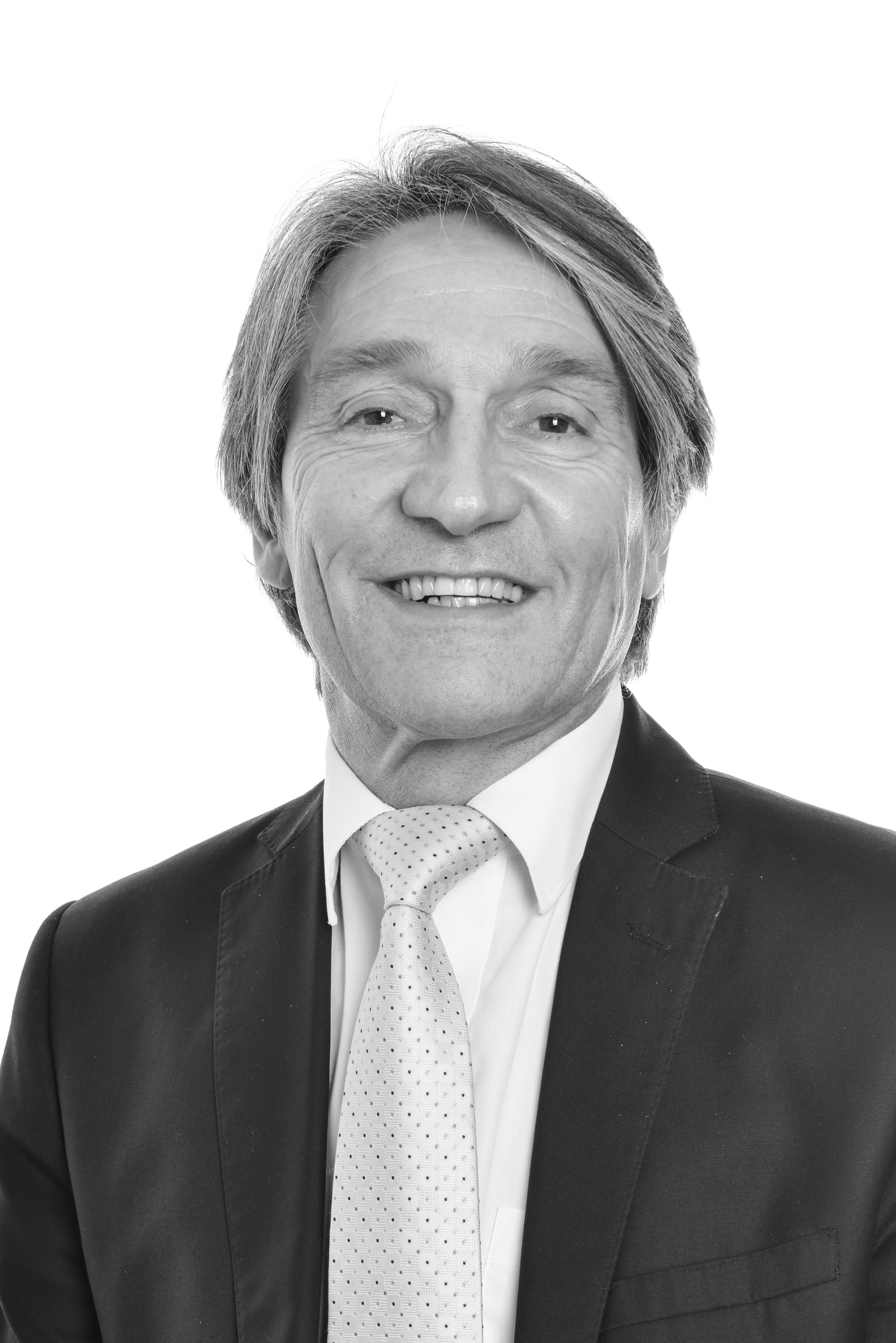

Personal information
- Full name: Neil Albert Prosser
- Date of birth: 8 March 1957 (age 69)
- Place of birth: Edmonton, England
- Position: Forward

Youth career
- Harlow Town

Senior career*
Years	Team	Apps	(Gls)
1980–1981	Bournemouth	2	(0)
1982–1983	Tranmere Rovers	2	(0)
- Swanage & Herston
Total		4	(0)
- * Club domestic league appearances and goals

Neil Prosser (born 8 March 1957) is an English footballer, who played as a forward in the Football League for Tranmere Rovers.
