= Peter Guthrie (footballer) =

English footballer (born 1961)

Personal information
- Date of birth: 10 October 1961 (age 65)
- Place of birth: Newcastle upon Tyne, England
- Position: Goalkeeper

Senior career*
Years	Team	Apps	(Gls)
- Whickham
1986–1987	Blyth Spartans		
1987–1988	Weymouth	20	(0)
1988–1989	Tottenham Hotspur	0	(0)
1988	→ Swansea City (loan)	14	(0)
1989–1990	Barnet	18	(0)
1990–1991	Bournemouth	10	(0)
1991–1993	Sing Tao		
1993–1994	Gateshead	8	(0)
1993–1994	Whitley Bay		(0)
1994–1997	Hong Kong Rangers		(0)
1997–2001	Happy Valley		(0)
2002–2003	Bedlington Terriers		(0)
2005–2006	Bedlington Terriers		(0)
- * Club domestic league appearances and goals

Peter Guthrie (born 10 October 1961 in Newcastle upon Tyne) is an English former professional footballer who played as a goalkeeper in the Football League for Swansea City and Bournemouth, and in the Hong Kong First Division League for Sing Tao, Hong Kong Rangers and Happy Valley. He played on several occasions for a representative Hong Kong League XI, including in their 3–1 defeat of the Chile national team in the 1998 Carlsberg Cup. He also played non-League football before, during and after his league career, for Whickham, Blyth Spartans – where he first became a goalkeeper, having previously played as a striker – Weymouth, Barnet, Whitley Bay and Bedlington Terriers.

== Honours ==
Swansea City

- Football League Fourth Division play-offs: 1988
