= Frank Stringfellow (footballer) =

English footballer

Personal information
- Full name: Frank Stringfellow
- Date of birth: March 1888
- Place of birth: Sutton-in-Ashfield, England
- Date of death: 1948 (aged 59–60)
- Position: Inside forward

Senior career*
Years	Team	Apps	(Gls)
–1908	Ilkeston United		
1908–1911	The Wednesday	20	(5)
1911	Mansfield Town		
1911–1922	Portsmouth	60	(26)
1917–1918	→ Broxburn United (guest)		
1922–1923	Heart of Midlothian	42	(8)
1923–1924	Weymouth		
- Pontypridd
1925–1928	Bournemouth & Boscombe Athletic	117	(30)
1929	Scunthorpe & Lindsey United		
- * Club domestic league appearances and goals

Frank Stringfellow (March 1888 – 1948) was an English professional footballer who played as an inside forward in the Football League for Bournemouth & Boscombe Athletic, Portsmouth and The Wednesday.

== Personal life ==
Stringfellow served as a private in the Machine Gun Corps of the British Army during the First World War. He was wounded in September 1918, just under two months before the Armistice.

== Career statistics ==
Appearances and goals by club, season and competition
Club	Season	League			National cup (Note: Includes FA Cup, Scottish Cup)		Total	
Club	Season	Division	Apps	Goals	Apps	Goals	Apps	Goals
The Wednesday	1908–09	First Division	7	0	0	0	7	0
The Wednesday	1909–10	First Division	6	2	0	0	6	2
The Wednesday	1910–11	First Division	7	3	1	0	8	3
The Wednesday	Total		20	5	1	0	21	5
Portsmouth	1920–21	Third Division South	37	13	1	0	38	13
Portsmouth	1921–22	Third Division South	23	13	2	2	25	15
Portsmouth	Total		60	26	3	2	63	28
Heart of Midlothian	1921–22	Scottish First Division	12	3	4	0	16	3
Heart of Midlothian	1922–23	Scottish First Division	30	5	2	1	32	6
Heart of Midlothian	Total		42	8	6	1	48	9
Career total			122	39	10	3	132	42

== Honours ==
Portsmouth

- Southern League First Division: 1919–20
