= Kenny Allen (footballer) =

English footballer (born 1948)

Personal information
- Full name: Kenneth Richard Allen
- Date of birth: 12 January 1948 (age 78)
- Place of birth: Thornaby-on-Tees, England
- Height: 6 ft 4 in (1.93 m)
- Position: Goalkeeper

Senior career*
Years	Team	Apps	(Gls)
- Tow Law Town
1968	Hartlepool	7	(0)
1968–1972	Hellenic		
1972	West Bromwich Albion	0	(0)
1972–1973	Workington		
1973–1978	Bath City		
1978–1983	AFC Bournemouth	152	(0)
1983	Bury	0	(0)
1983	Peterborough United	0	(0)
1983–1984	Halmstads BK	13	(0)
1984–1985	Torquay United	58	(0)
1985–1986	Swindon Town	45	(0)
1986–1988	Torquay United	74	(0)
1988–1989	Bath City	9	(0)
1989	Newport County		
1989	Torquay United	0	(0)
1989	Salisbury City		
- * Club domestic league appearances and goals

Kenneth Richard Allen (born 12 January 1948) is an English retired professional football goalkeeper.

Kenny Allen began his career as an amateur with Hartlepool, who he joined in August 1968 from non-league Tow Law Town, a side later to produce Chris Waddle. He played only 7 league games for Hartlepool, before leaving, turning up next at South African side Hellenic. In December 1972 he returned to England, signing for West Bromwich Albion, but left without appearing in their league side.

He had a spell with Workington before joining Bath City in July 1973. He made nearly 300 appearances for Bath over the next five years.

In August 1978, Allen joined AFC Bournemouth, where he was to make 152 league appearances. In 1983, he signed for Bury on non-contract terms, but failed to make the first team, and in December 1983 he joined Peterborough United, playing only once in the Associate Members' Cup away to Wrexham. Peterborough proved to be an unhappy place for Allen a couple years later when, as a Torquay player, he was attacked on the pitch by Peterborough 'fans'.

From Peterborough, he moved to Sweden, playing for Halmstads BK, before joining Torquay United on a free transfer in March 1984, taking over from John Turner as first choice goalkeeper, making his début in a 2–1 defeat away to Hartlepool United on 17 March.

In September 1985, he left Plainmoor to join Swindon Town again on a free transfer. He played 40 league games the following season as Swindon won the Fourth Division title, but early the following season he lost his place to Fraser Digby, only playing a further 5 league games, before being transferred back to Torquay in December 1986 as a replacement for John Smeulders.

By now his grey hair and moustache made him instantly recognisable and he helped Torquay to remain in league football, playing in the first great escape when Torquay drew 2–2 with Crewe Alexandra at Plainmoor thanks to a late equaliser from Paul Dobson and help from the police dog Bryn biting Jim McNichol ensuring that injury time would be required. The following season, he was an ever-present as Cyril Knowles' side made the play-offs, but was released in the summer, joining Bath City in July 1988. He began the season as a regular, but after only nine games, broke his leg while conceding a penalty against Dorchester Town. He regained his fitness, but was released in February 1989.

He moved on to recently relegated Newport County, but as Newport folded and failed to complete their Conference season, he returned to Torquay for a third time in April 1989 to cover for the injured Ken Veysey and played at Wembley in the Associate Members' Cup Final as Torquay's only other professional keeper Mark Coombe was cup-tied. He retired from full-time football in June 1989 to work for the Post Office, playing for non-league Salisbury City in the following season.

In May 2001, the Torquay Herald Express reported that Allen was living in Paignton, captaining Chudleigh cricket team and working as a Patient Transport Driver for the Torbay and South Devon NHS Trust.

== Honours ==
Swindon Town

- Football League Fourth Division: 1985–86

Torquay United

- Associate Members' Cup runner-up: 1988–89
