= Brian Smith (footballer, born 1955) =

English footballer

Personal information
- Date of birth: 12 September 1955
- Place of birth: Bolton, England
- Date of death: August 2013 (aged 57)
- Height: 5 ft 7 in (1.70 m)
- Position: Midfielder

Youth career
- Bolton Wanderers

Senior career*
Years	Team	Apps	(Gls)
1974–1979	Bolton Wanderers	49	(3)
1977	→ Bradford City (loan)	8	(0)
1978	→ Tulsa Roughnecks (loan)	20	(4)
1979–1980	Blackpool	19	(1)
1980–1981	Bournemouth	40	(2)
1981–1982	Bury	6	(0)
1983–1985	Salisbury		
Total		142+	(10+)

International career
1973–1974	England Youth	4	(0)

Managerial career
- 1998: Atherton Collieries
- * Club domestic league appearances and goals

Brian Smith (12 September 1955 – August 2013) was an English professional footballer who played as a midfielder.

== Playing career ==
Born in Bolton, Smith played for Bolton Wanderers, Bradford City, Tulsa Roughnecks, Blackpool, Bournemouth, Bury and Salisbury.

He joined Bradford City on loan from Bolton in October 1977, and left in December 1977. For them he made 8 appearances in the Football League.

== Managerial career ==
Smith was appointed manager of Atherton Collieries in June 1998, but resigned in September the same year. He also served as assistant manager at Ashton Town and Daisy Hill.

== Death ==
Smith's death was announced on 3 September 2013. He had died the previous month at the age of 57, following a brief illness.

== Sources ==
- Frost, Terry (1988). Bradford City A Complete Record 1903-1988. Breedon Books Sport. ISBN 0-907969-38-0.
- Calley, Roy (1992). Blackpool: A Complete Record 1887-1992. Breedon Books Publishing Co Ltd. ISBN 1-873626-07-X.
