= Everald La Ronde =

English footballer

Personal information
- Full name: Everald La Ronde
- Date of birth: 24 January 1963 (age 63)
- Place of birth: East Ham, England
- Position: Defender

Youth career
- West Ham United

Senior career*
Years	Team	Apps	(Gls)
1981–1983	West Ham United	7	(0)
1983–1985	Bournemouth	24	(0)
1985	→ Peterborough United (loan)	8	(0)
- * Club domestic league appearances and goals

Everald La Ronde (born 24 January 1963) is an English former footballer who played as a defender.

La Ronde started his career at West Ham where he was captain of the team which won the 1981 Youth Cup Final. He played only 7 times for West Ham before signing for Bournemouth in September 1983. Arguably his most notable game for Bournemouth came on 7 January 1984 when he was part of the team which knocked Manchester United out of the FA Cup.

After an injury hit period amounting to only 24 games he completed a loan spell with Peterborough United before problems with his knee, stomach and hernia forced him to retire.

He also coached in Saudi Arabia.
