= Derek Dawkins =

English footballer

Derek Anthony Dawkins
- Born: 29 November 1959 (age 66); Edmonton
- Occupation: professional footballer

Derek Anthony Dawkins (born 29 November 1959) is an English former professional footballer, born in Edmonton, London, who played as a midfielder in the Football League for Leicester City, Mansfield Town, AFC Bournemouth and Torquay United.

Derek 'The Dude' Dawkins began his career as an apprentice with Leicester City, turning professional in November 1977 and making his league debut the same season. He played only 3 league games for the Foxes before moving to Mansfield Town in December 1978. He was released by the Field Mill side after 73 games, joining AFC Bournemouth in August 1981.

In February 1984 he joined Torquay United from Weymouth and began the most successful spell of his career, becoming a great favourite of the Plainmoor crowd. Won Player of the Year in 1986.His versatility was put to the test in May 1987, with Torquay at home to Crewe and in danger of losing league status, he played out of position in the centre of the Torquay defence, playing his part in the Gulls survival. His other great moment at Plainmoor was scoring the winner against a Tottenham Hotspur side containing the likes of Ray Clemence, Clive Allen, Gary Mabbutt and future Torquay player Chris Waddle, in a League Cup 2nd Round 1st Leg tie in 1987. He left Torquay after 175 games in which he scored 7 times, joining Newport County.

In the summer of 1990 he joined Gloucester City from Yeovil Town, where he appeared in the final match at their famous Huish ground and the first match at their new Huish Park stadium.

Whilst at Torquay he was in charge of the youth team at Torquay United, bringing through the likes of Lee Sharpe. In May 2001 the Torquay Herald Express reported that Dawkins was living in Torquay and running a mobile-phone cases business.

His son Luke was an apprentice with Torquay United, but was released at the end of his apprenticeship in March 2001.

Derek was involved with the Sheffield United Academy in Torrevieja, Spain.
