= Steve Carter (footballer, born 1953) =

English footballer

Personal information
- Date of birth: 23 April 1953 (age 73)
- Place of birth: Great Yarmouth, England
- Position: Forward

Youth career
- Manchester City

Senior career*
Years	Team	Apps	(Gls)
1970–1972	Manchester City	6	(2)
1972–1978	Notts County	188	(21)
1978–80	Derby County	33	(1)
1980–1981	Minnesota Kicks		
1982–1984	AFC Bournemouth	46	(1)
1984–1985	Torquay United	16	(1)
1985-	Lymington Town		
- * Club domestic league appearances and goals

Stephen Charles Carter (born 23 April 1953) is an English former professional footballer who played in the Football League for Manchester City, Notts County, Derby County, AFC Bournemouth and Torquay United. He played as a winger.

== Career ==
Carter was born in Great Yarmouth and began his career as an apprentice with Manchester City, turning professional in August 1970. After a promising start to his City career, he made his league debut at St James's Park against Newcastle United at the age 18, he was sold to Notts County in February 1972 for £18,000. He had scored twice in six league games for City, scoring at Huddersfield Town and a penalty against Liverpool at Maine Road. He joined a County side who were newly promoted to the Second Division, and finished in fourth place at the end of that season. His right-wing trickery, and expertise from the penalty spot helped County consolidate and establish themselves in the Second Division after a long spell out of the top two divisions.

In August 1978, after 21 goals in 188 league appearances for County, Carter joined Derby County, with Scotland international Don Masson going in the opposite direction. He immediately settled into the Derby County side, making his debut on 2 September in a 2–0 home defeat to Coventry City. Carter made 33 league appearances for Derby County, scoring just once. Whilst at Derby County Steve suffered a major injury to his achilles' tendon which resulted in two operations and almost two seasons missed of his Derby County career.

He rejoined Notts County, by now in the First Division, on a non-contract basis, before joining AFC Bournemouth on a free transfer in March 1982. He made 46 league appearances for AFC Bournemouth, scoring once, before joining Torquay United, again on a free transfer, in July 1984. He played only 16 times for the Gulls league side before leaving league football, joining non-league Lymington Town.

While with Derby, Carter was on the books of North American Soccer League team Minnesota Kicks.

Now living in Gorleston-on-Sea, Norfolk. He married Gail on 12 January 2001.
