= Paul Dobson (footballer) =

English footballer (1962–2026)

Personal information
- Date of birth: 17 December 1962
- Place of birth: Hartlepool, England
- Date of death: 1 July 2026 (aged 63)
- Height: 5 ft 9 in (1.75 m)
- Position: Striker

Youth career
- –1981: Newcastle United

Senior career*
Years	Team	Apps	(Gls)
1981–1982	Hartlepool United	31	(8)
1982–1983	Horden Colliery		
1983–1986	Hartlepool United	80	(24)
1986–1988	Torquay United	77	(38)
1988–1989	Doncaster Rovers	24	(10)
1989–1991	Scarborough	61	(22)
1990–1991	→ Halifax Town (loan)	1	(1)
1991	→ Hereford United (loan)	6	(1)
1991–1992	Lincoln City	21	(5)
1992–1993	Darlington	14	(2)
1993–1995	Gateshead		
1995–????	Bishop Auckland		
- Spennymoor United
- * Club domestic league appearances and goals

Paul Dobson (17 December 1962 – 1 July 2026) was an English professional footballer. He was a prolific striker in the lower leagues during the 1980s and early 1990s, notably for Torquay United.

Dobson began his career as a junior with Newcastle United, but on failing to make the grade joined Hartlepool United on a free transfer in November 1981. He scored 8 times in 31 games before leaving the Victoria Ground. However, he returned in December 1983, signing from Horden Colliery, and went on to play a further 80 league games, in which he scored 24 goals.

In July 1986, Dobson moved to Torquay United on a free transfer and was top scorer in his first season as Torquay struggled to remain in the league. The fact that they managed to do so was down to Dobson's goal in injury time against Crewe Alexandra in the final game of the season, injury time only awarded after Torquay defender Jim McNichol had been bitten by a police dog. Dobson's equaliser meant that Torquay stayed in Fourth Division on goal difference, with Lincoln City the first side to suffer automatic relegation to the Conference.

He left Plainmoor in August 1988, joining Doncaster Rovers for £20,000. After scoring 10 goals in 24 games for Doncaster, Scarborough stepped in and paid £40,000 for his services. He scored 22 times in 61 games for Scarborough but was out of favour at the beginning of the 1990–91 season, joining first Halifax Town on loan in October 1990, with a further loan spell at Hereford United the following month.

In January 1991, he moved to Lincoln City for £40,000. He scored 5 goals in 21 league appearances. In August 1992, he moved to Darlington, playing 14 league games (10 of which were as a substitute), scoring twice before joining Conference side Gateshead, initially on loan, in February 1993, and signing permanently for a fee of £3,500. He won the Conference Golden Boot as top-scorer in the 1993–94 and 1994–95 seasons, but after starting the first three games of the following season, Dobson lost his place in the team and featured only as a substitute until leaving to join Bishop Auckland in November 1995, Gateshead making a profit on the sale. He ended his football career with Spennymoor United.

In May 2001, the Torquay Herald Express reported that Dobson, at that point diagnosed as a diabetic, was living in Newton Aycliffe in County Durham and working as a welder.

Dobson died in July 2026, at the age of 63.
