= Paul Compton =

English footballer and manager (born 1961)

Personal information
- Full name: Paul David Compton
- Date of birth: 6 June 1961 (age 65)
- Place of birth: Stroud, England
- Height: 6 ft 1 in (1.85 m)
- Position: Central defender

Youth career
- Cheltenham Town
- Cardiff City

Senior career*
Years	Team	Apps	(Gls)
1978–1980	Trowbridge Town		
1980–1983	AFC Bournemouth	64	(0)
1983–1984	Aldershot	13	(0)
1984–1986	Torquay United	95	(4)
1986–1987	Newport County	27	(2)
1987–1991	Weymouth		
1991	Bashley		
1991–1993	Torquay United	21	(0)
1997–1998	Bideford		

Managerial career
- 1990: Weymouth
- 1992-1993: Torquay United
- * Club domestic league appearances and goals

Paul David Compton (born 6 June 1961) is an English former professional footballer and football club manager. He most notably managed Torquay United during the 1992–93 season, and was assistant manager at Dorchester Town prior to rejoining Torquay United in the summer of 2008 as joint manager of their new youth set-up. He was born in Stroud.

== Career ==
=== Playing career ===
After ending an apprenticeship with Cardiff City, Compton joined Trowbridge Town in 1978, moving to AFC Bournemouth in October 1980 for a fee of £10,000. He played 64 times for the Cherries before a free transfer took him to Aldershot in December 1983. This was swiftly followed by another free transfer move to Torquay United in February 1984 where he quickly established himself as an aerial presence in Torquay's defence, though lacking the pace that could have taken him to a higher level.

After his debut away to Hereford United on 25 February, he played every game until the end of the season and played fairly regularly for the Gulls before leaving to join Newport County in December 1986. He left Newport, prior to their eventual demise, shortly after playing in the Welsh Cup final defeat against Merthyr Tydfil, in the summer of 1987, joining Weymouth, taking over as player-manager in 1990 and leaving in February 1991 to join Bashley with Weymouth bottom of the Southern League Premier Division.

=== Coaching career ===
Compton rejoined Torquay United in August 1991 as youth coach, although he also restarted his professional playing career. On 8 May 1992, Compton was appointed as manager of Torquay, shortly after their relegation back to the bottom flight of the Football League. The expected push for promotion did not materialise and Torquay found themselves in a relegation battle, which, only after Neil Warnock was brought in and Compton had reverted to his old youth coach role, they survived. He later became assistant manager under Eddie May in 1995, but left the club altogether the following summer when May was replaced by Kevin Hodges, who opted to dispense with Compton's services.

Between 1996 and 1997 he was the youth coach at Preston North End, but returned to the south-west, joining Bideford as player, playing in the centre of defence alongside former Torquay player Phil Lloyd. In the 1998 close season, Compton returned to Plainmoor as Torquay United's youth coach, bringing through many of the players that later brought money into Plainmoor on their sale.

In September 2000, shortly after making the shortlist for the youth development job at Southampton, Compton moved to Swansea City as director of youth development at the Vetch Field. With Swansea in the midst of a serious financial crisis, Compton, along with the Swans management team of Colin Addison and Peter Nicholas, was made redundant, the Welsh side no longer able to pay his wages.

He subsequently joined West Bromwich Albion as youth coach, before joining Cardiff City as Head of player recruitment. He left this post in August 2007, and became assistant manager at Dorchester Town in December 2007. Immediately upon appointment, however, he took control of first team affairs whilst Director of Football Shaun Brooks took time off due to ill health.

In June 2008 he became joint manager of Torquay United's youth set-up alongside Matt Williams.

In 2017 Compton joined Southampton FC as their head of academy recruitment for the South West. Compton also travels into Europe looking to recruit talented young players.
