= Phil Brignull =

English footballer

Personal information
- Full name: Philip Arthur Brignull
- Date of birth: 2 October 1960 (age 66)
- Place of birth: Stratford, London, England
- Height: 6 ft 0 in (1.83 m)
- Position: Defender

Youth career
- West Ham United

Senior career*
Years	Team	Apps	(Gls)
1978–1981	West Ham United	1	(0)
1981–1985	Bournemouth	129	(0)
1985–1986	→ Wrexham (loan)	5	(1)
1985–1987	Cardiff City	49	(0)
1987–1988	Newport County	3	(0)
- Weymouth

International career
1976	England Schoolboys	8	(2)
- * Club domestic league appearances and goals as of 11:21 06/01/2010

Philip Arthur Brignull (born 2 October 1960) is an English former professional footballer who played from 1978 to 1988. As a defender, he made over 150 appearances in the Football League during his career.

== Career ==
An England schoolboy international, Brignull started his career as a youth team player at West Ham United. He played just one game in all competitions for West Ham, as a substitute during a 0–0 draw with Cardiff City in on 11 May 1979, before moving to Bournemouth in August 1981. He was a member of the Bournemouth team which knocked Manchester United out of the FA Cup in January 1984. He played as Bournemouth won the inaugural Associate Members' Cup by beating Hull City in the final. He also played for Wrexham, Cardiff City, Newport County and Weymouth.

He is the uncle of former Leicestershire cricketer David Brignull and his son is Liam Brignull.

== Honours ==
Bournemouth

- Associate Members' Cup: 1983–84
