= Ian Leigh =

English footballer

Personal information
- Date of birth: 11 June 1962 (age 64)
- Place of birth: Ilfracombe, England
- Position: Goalkeeper

Youth career
- 1978–1979: Swaythling
- 1979–1981: Bournemouth

Senior career*
| Years | Team | Apps | (Gls) |
| 1981–1986 | Bournemouth | 123 | (0) |
| 1984 | → Bristol City (loan) | 1 | (0) |
| 1985 | → Torquay United (loan) | 4 | (0) |
| 1986 | Bashley | ? | (?) |
| 1986–1992 | Hamrun Spartans | ? | (?) |
| Total | | 128 | (0) |
- * Club domestic league appearances and goals

Ian Leigh (born 11 June 1962) is an English former professional footballer who played as a goalkeeper. Active between 1981 and 1992 in both England and Malta, in both League and non-League football, Leigh made over 125 career appearances.

== Early and personal life ==
Leigh was born in Ilfracombe, Devon on 11 June 1962. After retiring as a professional footballer, Leigh later became a double-glazing salesman in Southampton.

== Career ==
Leigh began his career in non-League football with Swaythling, leaving them as a seventeen-year-old in October 1979 to join Football League team Bournemouth. Leigh made his professional debut for Bournemouth in 1981 after replacing the injured Kenny Allen in an away game against Peterborough United, a game in which Bournemouth lost 1–0. Over the next five seasons, Leigh made 123 appearances in the Football League for Bournemouth. While playing in the FA Cup against defending champions Manchester United in January 1984, Leigh kept a clean sheet in a 2–0 victory, and was rewarded with a lifetime supply of pizzas from a local Italian restaurant. The deal stayed in place for over a year, until Bournemouth's then manager Harry Redknapp bought the restaurant, citing the fact that Leigh was getting, "a bit fat, a little bit lumpy." He also played as Bournemouth won the inaugural Associate Members' Cup by beating Hull City in the final. Towards the end of his Bournemouth career, Leigh spent brief loan spells at Bristol City and Torquay United, making one and four appearances respectively. After Leigh left Bournemouth in 1986, he briefly played non-League football for Bashley, before moving to Malta to play with Hamrun Spartans, where he spent a further six seasons. Leigh was renowned for his powerful long shots, and became Ħamrun Spartans' penalty taker.

== Honours ==
Bournemouth

- Associate Members' Cup: 1983–84
