= Kevin Dawtry =

English footballer (1958–2025)

Personal information
- Full name: Kevin Austin Dawtry
- Date of birth: 15 June 1958
- Place of birth: Hythe, Hampshire, England
- Date of death: 13 August 2025 (aged 67)
- Position: Midfielder

Senior career*
Years	Team	Apps	(Gls)
1978–1979	Southampton	1	(0)
1980–1981	Crystal Palace	0	(0)
1981–1984	AFC Bournemouth	63	(11)
1982	→ Reading (loan)	4	(0)
1984–1985	Road-Sea Southampton		
1985–1986	Salisbury City		
1986–1987	Fareham Town		
1987–1988	Gosport Borough		
1988–1990	Salisbury City		
1990	Blackfield & Langley		
Total		68	(11)
- * Club domestic league appearances and goals

Kevin Austin Dawtry (15 June 1958 – 13 August 2025) was an English footballer who played as a midfielder. In the Football League, Dawtry played for Southampton, Crystal Palace, AFC Bournemouth and Reading.

== Career ==
After representing Southampton Schools, Dawtry turned professional with Southampton in June 1976, and made over a hundred appearances in their reserve team. He only made one appearance in the first team, as a substitute at Nottingham Forest in 1979. In 1980 he moved to Crystal Palace, but moved on to AFC Bournemouth the following spring without making a first team appearance. At the start of the 1981/82 season, he scored three goals in the first six games in the Fourth Division of the Football League, achieving promotion in that season. Following a brief loan spell with Reading early in the 1982/83 season, he continued to play for AFC Bournemouth for the remainder of that season in the Third Division.

In 1984 he moved into non-league football, playing for several clubs in the Southern League.. He later coached and managed in the Wessex League, managing Totton and Eling between 2008 and 2013.

== Death ==
Dawtry died after a short battle with cancer on 13 August 2025, at the age of 67.
