= Mark Nightingale (footballer) =

English footballer

Personal information
- Full name: Mark Nightingale
- Date of birth: 1 February 1957 (age 69)
- Place of birth: Salisbury, England
- Height: 5 ft 11 in (1.80 m)
- Positions: Defender; midfielder

Senior career*
Years	Team	Apps	(Gls)
1974–1976	AFC Bournemouth	49	(4)
1976–1977	Crystal Palace	0	(0)
1977–1982	Norwich City	35	(0)
1982	Bulova SA		
1982–1986	AFC Bournemouth	150	(4)
1986–1988	Peterborough United	78	(3)
- Kettering Town
Total		312	(4)

International career
1975	England Youth	9	(0)
- * Club domestic league appearances and goals

Mark Nightingale (born 1 February 1957) is an English footballer who played in the Football League for AFC Bournemouth, Norwich City and Peterborough United. He played as Bournemouth won the inaugural Associate Members' Cup by beating Hull City in the final.

== Honours ==
Bournemouth

- Associate Members' Cup: 1983–84
