= John Smeulders =

English footballer

Personal information
- Full name: John Smeulders
- Date of birth: 28 March 1957 (age 69)
- Place of birth: Hackney, England
- Height: 5 ft 11 in (1.80 m)
- Position: Goalkeeper

Youth career
- –1972: Chelsea
- 1972–1974: Orient

Senior career*
Years	Team	Apps	(Gls)
1974–1979	Orient	0	(0)
1979–1981	AFC Bournemouth	14	(0)
1981–1983	Trowbridge Town	83	(0)
1983–1984	Weymouth	23	(0)
1984–1986	AFC Bournemouth	75	(0)
1986–1987	Torquay United	18	(0)
1987	→ Peterborough United (loan)	1	(0)
- → Poole Town (loan)
1987–1989	AFC Bournemouth	9	(0)
1988	→ Brentford (loan)	8	(0)
	→ Farnborough Town (loan)	2	(0)
	Weymouth	20	(0)
1991–1992	Fareham Town	3	(0)

International career
- England Youth
- * Club domestic league appearances and goals

John Smeulders (born 28 March 1957) is an English retired professional footballer who played as a goalkeeper, best remembered for his three spells in the Football League with AFC Bournemouth. He also played League football for Torquay United, Brentford and Peterborough United.

== Club career ==
A goalkeeper, Smeulders began his career as a youth with Orient. He was unable to displace the number 1 shirt from Ray Goddard and John Jackson and made just a handful of League Cup appearances before departing the Os in 1979. To revive his stalled career, Smeulders began the first of three spells with Bournemouth in July 1979. After failing to break into the first team, Smeulders dropped into non-League football in January 1981 with Trowbridge Town, moving on to Weymouth and then back to Bournemouth in January 1984. This time he did establish himself in the first team, making 75 league appearances, setting a then-club record seven consecutive clean sheets and being named the club's 1984–85 Player of the Year. Smeulders moved to Torquay United in July 1986, but after failing to hold down a first team place and spending time away from Plainmoor on loan, he returned to Bournemouth for the third time in August 1987. He again failed to hold down a regular place and dropped back into non-League football in 1989. Smeulders retired at age 38, due to a damaged knee.

== Coaching career ==
Smeulders later returned to Bournemouth as a coach to goalkeepers Neil Moss and Ian Andrews.

== International career ==
Smeulders won caps for England at youth level and played in the same team as Bryan Robson, Ray Wilkins, Glenn Hoddle and Peter Barnes.

== Personal life ==
As of March 1996, Smeulders was working in a bakery in Bournemouth. As of June 2020, he was living in Shaftesbury and working as a delivery driver for Waitrose and Riverford.

== Career statistics ==
Appearances and goals by club, season and competition
Club	Season	League			FA Cup		League Cup		Other		Total	
Club	Season	Division	Apps	Goals	Apps	Goals	Apps	Goals	Apps	Goals	Apps	Goals
Peterborough United (loan)	1986–87	Fourth Division	1	0	—		—		—		1	0
Brentford (loan)	1988–89	Third Division	8	0	—		1	0	—		9	0
Career total			9	0	0	0	1	0	0	0	10	0

== Honours ==
- Bournemouth Player of the Year: 1984–85
