= Keith Williams (footballer, born 1957) =

English footballer

Personal information
- Date of birth: 12 April 1957 (age 69)
- Place of birth: Dudley, England
- Height: 5 ft 9 in (1.75 m)
- Position: Midfielder

Youth career
- 1973–1975: Aston Villa

Senior career*
Years	Team	Apps	(Gls)
1975–1977	Aston Villa	0	(0)
1977–1981	Northampton Town	131	(6)
1981–1987	AFC Bournemouth	102	(1)
1987–1988	Colchester United	10	(0)
Total		243	(7)
- * Club domestic league appearances and goals

Keith Williams (born 12 April 1957) is an English footballer who played as a midfielder for Aston Villa, Northampton Town and AFC Bournemouth.
