= 1987–88 Northampton Town F.C. season =

Northampton Town F.C.
1987–88 season
- Chairman: Derek Banks
- Manager: Graham Carr
- Stadium: County Ground
- Division Three: 6th
- FA Cup: Second round
- Littlewoods Cup: Second round
- Sherpa Vans Trophy: Preliminary round
- Top goalscorer: League: Tony Adcock; Paul Culpin; Trevor Morley (10); All: Trevor Morley (16)
- Highest home attendance: 7,934 vs Brighton & Hove Albion
- Lowest home attendance: 3,076 vs Brentford
- Average home league attendance: 5,514

The 1987–88 season was Northampton Town's 91st season in their history and the first season back in the Third Division after an eleven year absence, following promotion the previous season. Alongside competing in Division Three, the club also participated in the FA Cup, League Cup and Associate Members' Cup.

== Players ==
As of match played 2 May 1988.

Name	Position	Nat.	Place of Birth	Date of Birth (Age)	Apps	Goals	Previous club	Date signed	Fee
Goalkeepers
Peter Gleasure	GK	(England)	Luton	8 October 1960 (aged 27)	277	0	Millwall	March 1983	
Alan Harris	GK	(England)	Nuneaton	13 April 1969 (aged 19)	0	0	Nuneaton Town	Summer 1986	£15,000
Defenders
David Logan	LB	(England)	Middlesbrough	5 December 1963 (aged 24)	46	1	Mansfield Town	February 1987	
Keith McPherson	CB	(England)	Greenwich	11 September 1963 (aged 24)	116	6	West Ham United	23 January 1986	£10,000
Graham Reed	RB	(England)	Doncaster	24 June 1961 (aged 26)	127	2	Frickley Athletic	Summer 1985	£6,000
Bradley Sandeman	RB	(England)	Northampton	24 February 1970 (aged 18)	2	0	Apprentice	January 1988	N/A
Trevor Slack	CB	(England)	Peterborough	26 September 1962 (aged 25)	13	1	Grimsby Town	10 February 1988	Nominal Fee
Russ Wilcox	CB	(England)	Hemsworth	25 March 1964 (aged 24)	95	8	Frickley Athletic	30 June 1986	£15,000
Paul Wilson	LB	(England)	Bradford	2 August 1968 (aged 19)	15	1	Norwich City	11 April 1988	£30,000
Midfielders
Warren Donald	CM	(England)	Hillingdon	7 October 1964 (aged 23)	141	11	West Ham United	4 October 1985	£11,000
Dave Gilbert	W	(England)	Lincoln	22 June 1963 (aged 24)	102	19	Boston United	Summer 1986	
Eddie McGoldrick	W	(England)	Islington	30 April 1965 (aged 23)	101	8	Nuneaton Town	Summer 1986	£15,000
Martin Singleton (c)	CM	(England)	Banbury	2 August 1963 (aged 24)	31	3	West Bromwich Albion	7 November 1987	£57,500
Forwards
Tony Adcock	FW	(England)	Bethnal Green	27 March 1963 (aged 25)	18	10	Manchester City	25 January 1988	£85,000 P/E
Paul Culpin	FW	(England)	Kirby Muxloe	8 February 1962 (aged 26)	24	10	Coventry City	10 October 1987	£50,000
Glen Donegal	FW	(England)	Northampton	20 June 1969 (aged 18)	13	2	Apprentice	January 1987	N/A
David Longhurst	FW	(England)	Northampton	15 January 1965 (aged 23)	41	9	Halifax Town	3 July 1987	£40,000

== Competitions ==
=== Barclays League Division Three ===
==== League table ====
Pos	Team	Pld	W	D	L	GF	GA	GD	Pts	Relegation
1	Sunderland (C, P)	46	27	12	7	92	48	+44	93	Promotion to the Second Division
2	Brighton & Hove Albion (P)	46	23	15	8	69	47	+22	84	Promotion to the Second Division
3	Walsall (O, P)	46	23	13	10	68	50	+18	82	Qualification for the Third Division play-offs
4	Notts County	46	23	12	11	82	49	+33	81	Qualification for the Third Division play-offs
5	Bristol City	46	21	12	13	77	62	+15	75	Qualification for the Third Division play-offs
6	Northampton Town	46	18	19	9	70	51	+19	73	
7	Wigan Athletic	46	20	12	14	70	61	+9	72	
8	Bristol Rovers	46	18	12	16	68	56	+12	66	
9	Fulham	46	19	9	18	69	60	+9	66	
10	Blackpool	46	17	14	15	71	62	+9	65	
11	Port Vale	46	18	11	17	58	56	+2	65	
12	Brentford	46	16	14	16	53	59	−6	62	
13	Gillingham	46	14	17	15	77	61	+16	59	
14	Bury	46	15	14	17	58	57	+1	59	
15	Chester City	46	14	16	16	51	62	−11	58	
16	Preston North End	46	15	13	18	48	59	−11	58	
17	Southend United	46	14	13	19	65	83	−18	55	
18	Chesterfield	46	15	10	21	41	70	−29	55	
19	Mansfield Town	46	14	12	20	48	59	−11	54	
20	Aldershot	46	15	8	23	64	74	−10	53	
21	Rotherham United (R)	46	12	16	18	50	66	−16	52	Qualification for the Fourth Division play-offs
22	Grimsby Town (R)	46	12	14	20	48	58	−10	50	Relegation to the Fourth Division
23	York City (R)	46	8	9	29	48	91	−43	33	Relegation to the Fourth Division
24	Doncaster Rovers (R)	46	8	9	29	40	84	−44	33	Relegation to the Fourth Division

Rules for classification: 1) Points; 2) Goal difference; 3) Goals scored
(C) Champions; (O) Play-off winners; (P) Promoted; (R) Relegated

==== Results summary ====
Overall								Home						Away					
Pld	W	D	L	GF	GA	GD	Pts	W	D	L	GF	GA	GD	W	D	L	GF	GA	GD
46	18	19	9	70	51	+19	73	12	8	3	36	18	+18	6	11	6	34	33	+1

Last updated: 7 April 2020.

==== League position by match ====
Round	1	2	3	4	5	6	7	8	9	10	11	12	13	14	15	16	17	18	19	20	21	22	23	24	25	26	27	28	29	30	31	32	33	34	35	36	37	38	39	40	41	42	43	44	45	46
Ground	A	A	H	A	H	H	A	A	H	A	H	A	H	A	H	A	H	A	H	A	H	A	A	H	H	A	A	H	H	H	H	A	H	A	H	A	H	H	A	H	A	H	A	A	H	A
Result	W	L	D	W	W	L	D	W	W	D	W	D	W	L	W	D	D	D	W	L	L	D	D	D	D	L	W	W	L	D	W	D	W	D	W	W	D	D	D	W	W	W	L	D	D	L
Position	1	15	12	11	2	8	8	6	1	3	1	1	1	5	3	3	3	4	3	4	6	6	8	8	8	8	7	6	6	6	5	6	6	6	6	5	5	5	5	5	5	4	6	5	5	6

Source: Rothmans Football Yearbook 1986-87
A = Away; H = Home; W = Win; D = Draw; L = Loss

==== Matches ====
Win Draw Loss

15 August 1987 1	Chester City	0–5	Northampton Town	Chester
15:00 BST			T.Morley; P.Chard; R.Wilcox; D.Longhurst; D.Gilbert	Stadium: Sealand Road; Attendance: 3,453

29 August 1987 2	Walsall	1–0	Northampton Town	Walsall
15:00 BST	P.Jones			Stadium: Spotland Stadium; Attendance: 5,993

31 August 1987 3	Northampton Town	1–1	Brighton & Hove Albion	Northampton
15:00 BST	T.Morley		G.Armstrong	Stadium: County Ground; Attendance: 7,934; Referee: Keith Miller

5 September 1987 4	Doncaster Rovers	0–2	Northampton Town	Doncaster
15:00 BST			T.Morley; D.Longhurst	Stadium: Belle Vue; Attendance: 1,869

9 September 1987 5	Northampton Town	2–1	Brentford	Northampton
19:30 BST	D.Gilbert; D.Longhurst		R.Cooke (pen.)	Stadium: County Ground; Attendance: 5,748

12 September 1987 6	Northampton Town	0–1	Notts County	Northampton
15:00 BST			G.Lund	Stadium: County Ground; Attendance: 6,023; Referee: Jim Borrett

15 September 1987 7	Preston North End	0–0	Northampton Town	Preston
19:30 BST				Stadium: Deepdale; Attendance: 5,179

19 September 1987 8	Bristol Rovers	0–2	Northampton Town	Bath
15:00 BST			T.Morley; P.Chard	Stadium: Twerton Park; Attendance: 3,668

26 September 1987 9	Northampton Town	1–0	Port Vale	Northampton
15:00 BST	P.Chard			Stadium: County Ground; Attendance: 5,072; Referee: Colin Downey

29 September 1987 10	Southend United	1–1	Northampton Town	Southend-on-Sea
15:00 BST	D.Hall		T.Morley	Stadium: Roots Hall; Attendance: 3,506

3 October 1987 11	Northampton Town	3–0	Bristol City	Northampton
15:00 BST	P.Chard; P.Bunce			Stadium: County Ground; Attendance: 6,234; Referee: Kelvin Morton

11 October 1987 12	Rotherham United	2–2	Northampton Town	Rotherham
15:00 BST	C.Airey; T.Grealish		P.Culpin; T.Morley	Stadium: Millmoor; Attendance: 5,173

17 October 1987 13	Northampton Town	4–0	Chesterfield	Northampton
15:00 BST	T.Morley; P.Culpin; I.Benjamin			Stadium: County Ground; Attendance: 5,073

20 October 1987 14	Mansfield	3–1	Northampton Town	Mansfield
19:30 BST	S.Charles (pen.); D.Hodges; S.Coleman		P.Culpin	Stadium: Field Mill; Attendance: 3,646

24 October 1987 15	Northampton Town	2–1	Grimsby Town	Northampton
19:30 BST	D.Gilbert (pen.); P.Culpin		P.Turner	Stadium: County Ground; Attendance: 5,388; Referee: Kevin Cooper

31 October 1987 16	Aldershot	4–4	Northampton Town	Aldershot
15:00 GMT	T.Langley; G.Johnson; I.McDonald; S.Berry		P.Culpin; P.Roberts (o.g.); T.Morley; D.Longhurst	Stadium: Recreation Ground; Attendance: 3,358

4 November 1987 17	Northampton Town	0–0	York City	Northampton
19:30 GMT				Stadium: County Ground; Attendance: 4,950; Referee: Danny Vickers

7 November 1987 18	Fulham	0–0	Northampton Town	Fulham
15:00 GMT				Stadium: Craven Cottage; Attendance: 6,733

21 November 1987 19	Northampton Town	2–1	Gillingham	Northampton
15:00 GMT	T.Morley; R.Wilcox		S.Lovell	Stadium: County Ground; Attendance: 5,151; Referee: Stephen Lodge

28 November 1987 20	Blackpool	3–1	Northampton Town	Blackpool
15:00 GMT	T.Cunningham; K.Walwyn; S.Morgan		D.Longhurst	Stadium: Bloomfield Road; Attendance: 3,593

12 December 1987 21	Northampton Town	0–2	Sunderland	Northampton
15:00 GMT			P.Lemon; M.Gabbiadini	Stadium: County Ground; Attendance: 7,279; Referee: David Axcell

19 December 1987 22	Wigan Athletic	2–2	Northampton Town	Wigan
15:00 GMT	D.Thompson; A.Pilling		W.Donald; M.Singleton	Stadium: Springfield Park; Attendance: 2,692

26 December 1987 23	Port Vale	1–1	Northampton Town	Burslem
15:00 GMT	G.Hamson (pen.)		M.Singleton	Stadium: Vale Park; Attendance: 4,446

28 December 1987 24	Northampton Town	0–0	Bury	Northampton
15:00 GMT				Stadium: County Ground; Attendance: 6,067; Referee: Dennis Hedges

1 January 1988 25	Northampton Town	2–2	Walsall	Northampton
15:00 GMT	P.Chard; G.Donegal		P.Jones; N.Cross	Stadium: County Ground; Attendance: 6,034; Referee: David Elleray

2 January 1988 26	Notts County	3–1	Northampton Town	Nottingham
15:00 GMT	G.Lund; A.Thorpe		T.Morley; K.McPherson (red card)	Stadium: Meadow Lane; Attendance: 8,153

9 January 1988 27	Brentford	0–1	Northampton Town	Brentford
15:00 GMT			P.Chard	Stadium: Griffin Park; Attendance: 6,025

16 January 1988 28	Northampton Town	2–1	Bristol Rovers	Northampton
15:00 GMT	D.Gilbert; W.Donald		I.Alexander	Stadium: County Ground; Attendance: 4,473

27 January 1988 29	Northampton Town	0–1	Preston North End	Northampton
19:30 GMT			N.Jemson	Stadium: County Ground; Attendance: 5,052

30 January 1988 30	Northampton Town	1–1	Wigan Athletic	Northampton
15:00 GMT	T.Adcock		A.Pilling	Stadium: County Ground; Attendance: 4,825

6 February 1988 31	Northampton Town	1–0	Doncaster Rovers	Northampton
15:00 GMT	T.Adcock			Stadium: County Ground; Attendance: 4,381

13 February 1988 32	Bury	0–0	Northampton Town	Bury
15:00 GMT				Stadium: Gigg Lane; Attendance: 2,172

20 February 1988 33	Northampton Town	2–0	Chester City	Northampton
15:00 GMT	T.Adcock; T.Slack			Stadium: County Ground; Attendance: 4,285

27 February 1988 34	Bristol City	2–2	Northampton Town	Bristol
15:00 GMT	A.Walsh; G.Reed (o.g.)		T.Adcock; P.Chard	Stadium: Ashton Gate; Attendance: 8,578

2 March 1988 35	Northampton Town	4–0	Southend United	Northampton
19:30 GMT	E.McGoldrick; D.Longhurst; R.Wilcox; T.Adcock			Stadium: County Ground; Attendance: 4,249

5 March 1988 36	Chesterfield	0–2	Northampton Town	Chesterfield
15:00 GMT			E.McGoldrick; D.Gilbert	Stadium: Saltergate; Attendance: 2,400

11 March 1988 37	Northampton Town	0–0	Rotherham United	Northampton
19:30 GMT				Stadium: County Ground; Attendance: 5,432

19 March 1988 38	Northampton Town	1–1	Aldershot	Northampton
19:30 GMT	T.Adcock		S.Berry	Stadium: County Ground; Attendance: 4,322

26 March 1988 39	Grimsby Town	2–2	Northampton Town	Cleethorpes
15:00 GMT	S.Cunnington; N.Robinson		M.Singleton; P.Culpin	Stadium: Blundell Park; Attendance: 3,406

2 April 1988 40	Northampton Town	3–2	Fulham	Northampton
15:00 BST	T.Adcock; J.Stannard (o.g.); P.Culpin		J.Skinner; G.Barnett	Stadium: County Ground; Attendance: 6,211

4 April 1988 41	Gillingham	1–2	Northampton Town	Gillingham
15:00 BST	S.Lovell		P.Culpin; T.Adcock	Stadium: Priestfield; Attendance: 4,131

10 April 1988 42	Northampton Town	2–0	Mansfield Town	Northampton
15:00 BST	R.Wilcox; T.Kenworthy (o.g.)			Stadium: County Ground; Attendance: 6,917

15 April 1988 43	Brighton & Hove Albion	3–0	Northampton Town	Hove
19:30 BST	A.Owers; S.Gatting; G.Nelson			Stadium: Goldstone Ground; Attendance: 14,455

23 April 1988 44	York City	2–2	Northampton Town	York
19:30 BST	G.Howlett		P.Culpin; P.Wilson	Stadium: Bootham Crescent; Attendance: 2,048

30 April 1988 45	Northampton Town	3–3	Blackpool	Northampton
15:00 BST	D.Longhurst; D.Gilbert; T.Adcock		K.Walwyn; C.Methven; S.Morgan	Stadium: County Ground; Attendance: 5,730

2 May 1988 46	Sunderland	3–1	Northampton Town	Sunderland
15:00 BST	J.MacPhail (pen.); G.Armstrong 48'; E.Gates 75'		T.Adcock 37'	Stadium: Roker Park; Attendance: 29,454; Referee: James McAulay

=== FA Cup ===
14 November 1987 First round	Northampton Town	2–1	Newport County	Northampton
15:00 GMT	T.Morley; P.Chard		D.Holtham	Stadium: County Ground; Attendance: 4,581; Referee: Terry Holbrook

5 December 1987 Second round	Northampton Town	1–2	Brighton & Hove Albion	Northampton
15:00 GMT	T.Morley		K.Bremner; G.Nelson	Stadium: County Ground; Attendance: 6,444; Referee: Vic Callow

=== Littlewoods Cup ===
17 August 1987 First round 1st leg	Port Vale	0–1	Northampton Town	Burslem
19:30 BST	Red card		D.Longhurst; P.Chard (red card); S.Senior (red card)	Stadium: Vale Park; Attendance: 3,398

2 September 1987 First round 2nd leg	Northampton Town	4–0	Port Vale	Northampton
19:30 BST	K.McPherson; T.Morley			Stadium: County Ground; Attendance: 4,748; Referee: Terry Holbrook

22 September 1987 Second round 1st leg	Ipswich Town	1–1	Northampton Town	Ipswich
19:30 BST	R.Zondervan		D.Gilbert	Stadium: Portman Road; Attendance: 5,645

7 October 1987 Second round 2nd leg	Northampton Town	2–4 (a.e.t.)	Ipswich Town	Northampton
19:30 BST	T.Morley; G.Donegal		G.Harbey; M.d'Avray; D.Lowe	Stadium: County Ground; Attendance: 8,316; Referee: Howard King

=== Sherpa Vans Trophy ===
Group 1
Team	Pld	W	D	L	GF	GA	GD	Pts
Brentford	2	1	0	1	3	3	0	3
Notts County	2	1	0	1	3	3	0	3
Northampton Town	2	1	0	1	1	1	0	3

13 October 1987 Prelim round (s)	Notts County	1–0	Northampton Town	Nottingham
19:30 GMT	C.Withe			Stadium: Meadow Lane; Attendance: 2,351

28 October 1987 Prelim round (s)	Northampton Town	1–0	Brentford	Northampton
19:30 GMT	D.Longhurst			Stadium: County Ground; Attendance: 3,076

=== Appearances and goals ===
Pos	Player	Division Three			FA Cup			League Cup			League Trophy			Total		
Pos	Player	Starts	Sub	Goals	Starts	Sub	Goals	Starts	Sub	Goals	Starts	Sub	Goals	Starts	Sub	Goals
GK	Peter Gleasure	46	–	–	2	–	–	4	–	–	2	–	–	54	–	–
GK	Alan Harris	–	–	–	–	–	–	–	–	–	–	–	–	–	–	–
DF	Lee Carter	–	1	–	–	–	–	–	–	–	–	–	–	–	1	–
DF	David Logan	24	2	–	–	1	–	3	–	–	1	–	–	28	3	–
DF	Keith McPherson	32	–	–	2	–	–	4	–	1	2	–	–	40	–	1
DF	Graham Reed	27	4	–	2	–	–	4	–	–	2	–	–	35	4	–
DF	Bradley Sandeman	–	2	–	–	–	–	–	–	–	–	–	–	–	2	–
DF	Trevor Slack	13	–	1	–	–	–	–	–	–	–	–	–	13	–	1
DF	Russ Wilcox	46	–	4	2	–	–	4	–	–	2	–	–	54	–	4
DF	Paul Wilson	15	–	1	–	–	–	–	–	–	–	–	–	15	–	1
MF	Warren Donald	39	1	2	2	–	–	2	–	–	2	–	–	45	1	2
MF	Dave Gilbert	41	–	6	2	–	–	4	–	1	2	–	–	49	–	7
MF	Eddie McGoldrick	40	6	2	1	1	–	3	–	–	2	–	–	46	7	2
MF	Martin Singleton	28	1	3	2	–	–	–	–	–	–	–	–	30	1	3
FW	Tony Adcock	18	–	10	–	–	–	–	–	–	–	–	–	18	–	10
FW	Paul Culpin	18	2	10	1	1	–	–	–	–	2	–	–	21	3	10
FW	Glen Donegal	2	8	1	–	–	–	–	1	1	–	–	–	2	9	2
FW	David Longhurst	33	2	7	2	–	–	3	–	1	1	–	1	39	2	9
Players who left before end of season:
DF	Chris O'Donnell	1	–	–	–	–	–	–	–	–	–	–	–	1	–	–
DF	Steve Senior	1	3	–	–	–	–	2	–	–	–	–	–	3	3	–
DF	Chris Scott	–	–	–	–	–	–	–	1	–	–	–	–	–	1	–
DF	Brett Williams	3	1	–	–	–	–	–	–	–	–	–	–	3	1	–
MF	Paul Bunce	5	5	1	–	–	–	1	1	–	–	–	–	6	6	1
MF	Phil Chard	33	1	8	2	–	1	3	–	–	1	–	–	39	1	9
MF	Aidy Mann	1	–	–	–	–	–	–	–	–	–	–	–	1	–	–
FW	Ian Benjamin	13	1	1	–	–	–	4	–	–	1	–	–	18	1	1
FW	Trevor Morley	27	–	10	2	–	2	4	–	4	2	–	–	35	–	16

== Transfers ==
=== Transfers in ===
Date from	Position	Nationality	Name	From	Fee
June 1987	RB	(England)	Steve Senior	(England) York City	
July 1987	CB	(England)	Chris Scott	(England) Blyth Spartans	
3 July 1987	FW	(England)	David Longhurst	(England) Halifax Town	£40,000
10 October 1987	FW	(England)	Paul Culpin	(England) Coventry City	£50,000
7 November 1987	CM	(England)	Martin Singleton	(England) West Bromwich Albion	£57,500
25 January 1988	FW	(England)	Tony Adcock	(England) Manchester City	£85,000 P/E
10 February 1988	CB	(England)	Trevor Slack	(England) Grimsby Town	Nominal Fee
11 April 1988	LB	(England)	Paul Wilson	(England) Norwich City	£15,000

=== Loans in ===
Date from	Position	Nationality	Name	From	Date until
January 1988	LB	(England)	Brett Williams	(England) Nottingham Forest	January 1988
January 1987	RB	(England)	Chris O'Donnell	(England) Ipswich Town	February 1987
February 1988	LB	(England)	Paul Wilson	(England) Norwich City	11 April 1988

=== Transfers out ===
Date from	Position	Nationality	Name	To	Fee
Summer 1987	CB	(England)	Bobby Coy	Free agent	Released
Summer 1987	CM	(England)	Richard Hill	(England) Watford	£265,000
October 1987	FW	(England)	Ian Benjamin	(England) Cambridge United	£25,000
October 1987	RB	(England)	Steve Senior	(England) Wigan Athletic	
November 1987	W	(England)	Aidy Mann	(Wales) Newport County	
25 January 1988	FW	(England)	Trevor Morley	(England) Manchester City	£175,000 P/E
March 1988	U	(England)	Phil Chard	(England) Wolverhampton Wanderers	£45,000
March 1988	CB	(England)	Chris Scott	(England) Lincoln City	
