= 1989–90 Northampton Town F.C. season =

Northampton Town
1989–90 season
- Chairman: Dick Underwood
- Manager: Graham Carr
- Stadium: County Ground
- Division Three: 22nd
- FA Cup: Fourth round
- Littlewoods Cup: First round
- Leyland DAF Cup: First round (s)
- Top goalscorer: League: Bobby Barnes (18); All: Bobby Barnes (20)
- Highest home attendance: 14,529 vs Coventry City
- Lowest home attendance: 1,665 vs Maidstone United
- Average home league attendance: 3,190

The 1989–90 season was Northampton Town's 93rd season in their history and the third successive season in the Third Division. Alongside competing in Division Three, the club also participated in the FA Cup, League Cup and Associate Members' Cup.

== Players ==
As of match played 5 May 1990.

Name	Position	Nat.	Place of Birth	Date of Birth (Age)	Apps	Goals	Previous club	Date signed	Fee
Goalkeepers
Peter Gleasure	GK	(England)	Luton	8 October 1960 (aged 29)	388	0	Millwall	March 1983	
Defenders
Irvin Gernon	LB	(England)	Birmingham	30 December 1962 (aged 27)	18	2	Reading	October 1989	£25,000
David Johnson	LB	(England)	Northampton	10 March 1967 (aged 23)	7	0	Irthlingborough Diamonds	July 1989	Free
Keith McPherson	CB	(England)	Greenwich	11 September 1963 (aged 26)	216	9	West Ham United	23 January 1986	£10,000
Steve Terry	CB	(England)	Clapton	14 June 1962 (aged 27)	17	2	Hull City	March 1990	£70,000
Russ Wilcox (c)	CB	(England)	Hemsworth	25 March 1964 (aged 26)	162	10	Frickley Athletic	30 June 1986	£15,000
Wayne Williams	RB	(England)	Telford	17 November 1963 (aged 26)	50	1	Shrewsbury Town	12 January 1988	
Paul Wilson	LB	(England)	Bradford	2 August 1968 (aged 21)	94	3	Norwich City	February 1988	£30,000
Midfielders
Micky Bell	W	(England)	Newcastle upon Tyne	15 November 1971 (aged 18)	6	0	Apprentice	April 1990	N/A
Steve Berry	CM	(England)	Liverpool	4 April 1963 (aged 27)	90	3	Aldershot	27 October 1988	£45,000
Steve Brown	LM	(England)	Northampton	6 July 1966 (aged 23)	39	4	Irthlingborough Diamonds	21 July 1989	Free
Phil Chard	U	(England)	Corby	16 October 1960 (aged 29)	171	33	Wolverhampton Wanderers	October 1989	
Warren Donald	CM	(England)	Hillingdon	7 October 1964 (aged 25)	220	14	West Ham United	4 October 1985	£11,000
Trevor Quow	CM	(England)	Peterborough	28 September 1960 (aged 29)	53	2	Gillingham	12 January 1989	
Bradley Sandeman	RM	(England)	Northampton	24 February 1970 (aged 20)	64	3	Apprentice	January 1988	N/A
David Scope	W	(England)	Newcastle upon Tyne	10 May 1967 (aged 22)	8	0	Blyth Spartans	September 1989	
Martin Singleton	CM	(England)	Banbury	2 August 1963 (aged 26)	60	5	West Bromwich Albion	7 November 1987	£57,500
Aidey Thorpe	LW	(England)	Chesterfield	25 November 1963 (aged 26)	13	3	Walsall	March 1990	£50,000
Forwards
Bobby Barnes	FW	(England)	Kingston upon Thames	17 December 1962 (aged 27)	45	20	Bournemouth	13 October 1989	£70,000
Darren Collins	FW	(England)	Winchester	24 May 1967 (aged 22)	53	10	Petersfield United	January 1989	
Carl Leaburn	FW	(England)	Lewisham	30 March 1969 (aged 21)	9	0	Charlton Athletic	22 March 1990	Loan

== Competitions ==
=== Barclays League Division Three ===
==== League table ====
Pos	Team	Pld	W	D	L	GF	GA	GD	Pts	Promotion or relegation
20	Fulham	46	12	15	19	55	66	−11	51	
21	Cardiff City (R)	46	12	14	20	51	70	−19	50	Relegation to the Fourth Division
22	Northampton Town (R)	46	11	14	21	51	68	−17	47	Relegation to the Fourth Division
23	Blackpool (R)	46	10	16	20	49	73	−24	46	Relegation to the Fourth Division
24	Walsall (R)	46	9	14	23	40	72	−32	41	Relegation to the Fourth Division

(R) Relegated

==== Results summary ====
Overall								Home						Away					
Pld	W	D	L	GF	GA	GD	Pts	W	D	L	GF	GA	GD	W	D	L	GF	GA	GD
46	11	14	21	51	68	−17	47	7	7	9	27	31	−4	4	7	12	24	37	−13

Last updated: 7 May 2020.
Source: 11v11.com

==== League position by match ====
Round	1	2	3	4	5	6	7	8	9	10	11	12	13	14	15	16	17	18	19	20	21	22	23	24	25	26	27	28	29	30	31	32	33	34	35	36	37	38	39	40	41	42	43	44	45	46
Ground	A	A	H	A	H	A	A	H	H	A	H	A	H	A	H	A	H	A	H	A	A	H	H	H	H	A	H	A	H	H	A	H	A	A	H	A	H	A	A	H	A	H	H	H	A	A
Result	L	D	W	D	W	L	W	L	L	L	W	L	D	D	L	D	L	W	W	D	W	W	D	L	D	L	L	L	D	D	D	D	L	L	L	L	D	L	W	L	L	L	W	W	D	L
Position	19	17	10	14	11	14	11	13	14	17	15	16	16	15	17	18	21	15	13	13	13	11	10	19	19	20	20	22	22	21	22	21	22	23	23	23	23	23	23	23	23	23	23	22	22	22

Source: 11v11.com
A = Away; H = Home; W = Win; D = Draw; L = Loss

==== Matches ====
Win Draw Loss

19 August 1989 1	Walsall	1–0	Northampton Town	Walsall
15:00 BST				Stadium: Bescot Stadium; Attendance: 5,020

26 August 1989 2	Swansea City	1–1	Northampton Town	Swansea, Wales
15:00 BST			D.Collins	Stadium: Vetch Field; Attendance: 3,637

2 September 1989 3	Northampton Town	2–0	Bristol City	Northampton
15:00 BST	D.Thomas; T.Adcock pen.'			Stadium: County Ground; Attendance: 4,088

9 September 1989 4	Wigan Athletic	0–0	Northampton Town	Wigan
15:00 BST				Stadium: Springfield Park; Attendance: 2,289; Referee: John Watson

16 September 1989 5	Northampton Town	2–1	Shrewsbury Town	Northampton
15:00 BST	D.Collins; T.Adcock pen.'			Stadium: County Ground; Attendance: 3,084; Referee: David Elleray

23 September 1989 6	Crewe Alexandra	2–1	Northampton Town	Crewe
15:00 BST			D.Collins	Stadium: Gresty Road; Attendance: 2,289

26 September 1989 7	Cardiff City	2–3	Northampton Town	Cardiff, Wales
19:30 BST			T.Quow; T.Adcock; D.Thomas	Stadium: Ninian Park; Attendance: 2,801

30 September 1989 8	Northampton Town	0–1	Bury	Northampton
15:00 BST				Stadium: County Ground; Attendance: 3,486

7 October 1989 9	Northampton Town	1–2	Preston North End	Northampton
15:00 BST	D.Collins			Stadium: County Ground; Attendance: 3,039

14 October 1989 10	Birmingham City	4–0	Northampton Town	Birmingham
15:00 BST	N.Gleghorn; D.Bailey pen.'			Stadium: St Andrew's; Attendance: 8,731; Referee: Paul Harrison

17 October 1989 11	Northampton Town	4–2	Blackpool	Northampton
19:30 BST	W.Donald; R.Wilcox; B.Barnes; D.Collins			Stadium: County Ground; Attendance: 3,098

21 October 1989 12	Bristol Rovers	4–2	Northampton Town	Bath
15:00 BST			S.Brown; B.Barnes pen.'	Stadium: Twerton Park; Attendance: 4,920

28 October 1989 13	Northampton Town	0–0	Notts County	Northampton
15:00 BST				Stadium: County Ground; Attendance: 3,734

21 October 1989 14	Fulham	1–1	Northampton Town	Fulham, London
19:30 GMT			B.Barnes pen.'	Stadium: Craven Cottage; Attendance: 3,518

4 November 1989 15	Northampton Town	1–2	Rotherham United	Northampton
15:00 GMT	B.Barnes pen.'			Stadium: County Ground; Attendance: 3,598

11 November 1989 16	Huddersfield Town	2–2	Northampton Town	Huddersfield
15:00 GMT	M.Smith; G.Mitchell		I.Gernon; B.Barnes	Stadium: Leeds Road; Attendance: 4,973; Referee: Gerald Ashby

25 November 1989 17	Northampton Town	0–2	Brentford	Northampton
15:00 GMT			E.May; D.Holdsworth	Stadium: County Ground; Attendance: 3,165

2 December 1989 18	Bolton Wanderers	0–3	Northampton Town	Bolton
15:00 GMT			B.Barnes; W.Donald	Stadium: Burnden Park; Attendance: 5,501

17 December 1989 19	Northampton Town	2–1	Reading	Northampton
15:00 GMT	B.Barnes; D.Collins			Stadium: County Ground; Attendance: 3,025

26 December 1989 20	Leyton Orient	1–1	Northampton Town	Leyton, London
15:00 GMT			B.Barnes	Stadium: Brisbane Road; Attendance: 4,784

30 December 1989 21	Mansfield Town	1–2	Northampton Town	Mansfield
15:00 GMT			S.Berry; B.Barnes	Stadium: Field Mill; Attendance: 3,210

1 January 1990 22	Northampton Town	1–0	Chester City	Northampton
15:00 GMT	S.Berry			Stadium: County Ground; Attendance: 3,823; Referee: Roger Pawley

13 January 1990 23	Northampton Town	1–1	Swansea City	Northampton
15:00 GMT	B.Barnes			Stadium: County Ground; Attendance: 3,944

17 February 1990 24	Northampton Town	0–2	Bolton Wanderers	Northampton
15:00 GMT	D.Thomas (red card)			Stadium: County Ground; Attendance: 3,432

20 February 1990 25	Northampton Town	1–1	Walsall	Northampton
19:30 GMT	D.Collins			Stadium: County Ground; Attendance: 2,617

25 February 1990 26	Brentford	3–2	Northampton Town	Brentford, London
15:00 GMT	G.Blissett; D.Holdsworth		D.Thomas; D.Collins	Stadium: Griffin Park; Attendance: 6,391

3 March 1990 27	Northampton Town	0–4	Tranmere Rovers	Northampton
15:00 GMT				Stadium: County Ground; Attendance: 3,147

6 March 1990 28	Bury	1–0	Northampton Town	Bury
19:30 GMT				Stadium: Gigg Lane; Attendance: 2,327

10 March 1990 29	Northampton Town	1–1	Cardiff City	Northampton
15:00 GMT	B.Barnes pen.'			Stadium: County Ground; Attendance: 2,574

13 March 1990 30	Northampton Town	1–1	Wigan Athletic	Northampton
19:30 GMT	P.Chard			Stadium: County Ground; Attendance: 2,172; Referee: Jim Rushton

17 March 1990 31	Preston North End	0–0	Northampton Town	Preston
15:00 GMT				Stadium: Deepdale; Attendance: 5,686

20 March 1990 32	Northampton Town	2–2	Birmingham City	Northampton
19:30 GMT	S.Terry; R.Wilcox		D.Peer; N.Gleghorn	Stadium: County Ground; Attendance: 4,346; Referee: Peter Jones

24 March 1990 33	Blackpool	1–0	Northampton Town	Blackpool
15:00 GMT				Stadium: Bloomfield Road; Attendance: 5,686

27 March 1990 34	Bristol City	3–1	Northampton Town	Bristol
19:30 BST			B.Barnes	Stadium: Ashton Gate; Attendance: 3,296

31 March 1990 35	Northampton Town	1–2	Bristol Rovers	Northampton
15:00 BST	A.Thorpe; W.Donald (red card)			Stadium: County Ground; Attendance: 3,774

3 April 1990 36	Shrewsbury Town	2–0	Northampton Town	Shrewsbury
19:30 BST				Stadium: Gay Meadow; Attendance: 2,314

7 April 1990 37	Northampton Town	2–2	Fulham	Northampton
15:00 BST	B.Sandeman; A.Thorpe			Stadium: County Ground; Attendance: 2,882

10 April 1990 38	Notts County	3–2	Northampton Town	Nottingham
19:30 BST			S.Terry; B.Barnes	Stadium: Meadow Lane; Attendance: 5,396

14 April 1990 39	Chester City	0–1	Northampton Town	Chester
15:00 BST			B.Barnes pen.'	Stadium: Sealand Road; Attendance: 2,242

16 April 1990 40	Northampton Town	0–1	Leyton Orient	Northampton
15:00 BST				Stadium: County Ground; Attendance: 3,215

21 April 1990 41	Reading	3–2	Northampton Town	Reading
15:00 BST			B.Barnes pen.' K.McPherson	Stadium: Elm Park; Attendance: 3,140

24 April 1990 42	Northampton Town	1–2	Mansfield Town	Northampton
19:30 BST	R.Wilcox			Stadium: County Ground; Attendance: 2,119

28 April 1990 43	Northampton Town	1–0	Huddersfield Town	Northampton
15:00 BST	B.Barnes			Stadium: County Ground; Attendance: 2,388; Referee: Michael Pierce

30 April 1990 44	Northampton Town	3–1	Crewe Alexandra	Northampton
19:30 BST	B.Barnes pen.' P.Chard; A.Thorpe			Stadium: County Ground; Attendance: 2,622

2 May 1990 45	Tranmere Rovers	0–0	Northampton Town	Birkenhead
19:30 BST				Stadium: Prenton Park; Attendance: 5,363; Referee: Paul Vanes

5 May 1990 46	Rotherham United	2–0	Northampton Town	Rotherham
15:00 BST				Stadium: Millmoor; Attendance: 3,420

=== FA Cup ===
18 November 1989 First round	Kettering Town	0–1	Northampton Town	Kettering
15:00 GMT			D.Thomas 69'	Stadium: Rockingham Road; Attendance: 6,100; Referee: Ray Lewis

9 December 1989 Second round	Northampton Town	0–0	Aylesbury United	Northampton
15:00 GMT				Stadium: County Ground; Attendance: 6,098; Referee: Allan Gunn

13 December 1990 Second round (r)	Aylesbury United	0–1	Northampton Town	Aylesbury
19:30 GMT			B.Barnes	Stadium: Buckingham Road; Attendance: 4,895

6 January 1990 Third round	Northampton Town	1–0	Coventry City	Northampton
15:00 GMT	S.Berry 43'			Stadium: County Ground; Attendance: 14,529

27 January 1990 Fourth round	Rochdale	3–0	Northampton Town	Rochdale
15:00 GMT				Stadium: Spotland Stadium; Attendance: 9,048

=== Littlewoods Cup ===
22 August 1989 First round 1st leg	Mansfield Town	1–1	Northampton Town	Mansfield
19:30 BST			T.Adcock	Stadium: Field Mill; Attendance: 3,095

5 September 1989 First round 2nd leg	Northampton Town	0–2	Mansfield Town	Northampton
19:30 BST				Stadium: County Ground; Attendance: 3,963

=== Leyland DAF Cup ===
Group 7
Team	Pld	W	D	L	GF	GA	GD	Pts	Qualification
Maidstone United	2	2	0	0	6	3	+3	6	Qualified for next round
Northampton Town	2	1	0	1	5	4	+1	3	Qualified for next round
Colchester United	2	0	0	2	1	5	−4	0	

7 November 1989 Prelim round (s)	Colchester United	0–3	Northampton Town	Colchester
19:30 GMT		Report	B.Barnes 26'; P.Chard 76'; D.Collins 88'	Stadium: Layer Road; Attendance: 1,780; Referee: Danny Vickers

28 November 1989 Prelim round (s)	Northampton Town	2–4	Maidstone United	Northampton
19:30 GMT	R.Wilcox; I.Gernon			Stadium: County Ground; Attendance: 1,665

17 January 1990 First round (s)	Southend United	2–1	Northampton Town	Southend-on-Sea
19:30 GMT			D.Collins	Stadium: Roots Hall; Attendance: 1,346

=== Appearances and goals ===
Pos	Player	Division Three			FA Cup			League Cup			League Trophy			Total		
Pos	Player	Starts	Sub	Goals	Starts	Sub	Goals	Starts	Sub	Goals	Starts	Sub	Goals	Starts	Sub	Goals
GK	Peter Gleasure	46	–	–	5	–	–	2	–	–	3	–	–	56	–	–
DF	Irvin Gernon	12	–	1	3	–	–	–	–	–	3	–	1	18	–	2
DF	David Johnson	6	1	–	–	–	–	–	–	–	–	–	–	6	1	–
DF	Keith McPherson	43	–	1	5	–	–	2	–	–	3	–	–	53	–	1
DF	Steve Terry	17	–	2	–	–	–	–	–	–	–	–	–	17	–	2
DF	Russ Wilcox	46	–	3	5	–	–	2	–	–	3	–	1	56	–	4
DF	Wayne Williams	14	1	–	–	–	–	1	1	–	1	–	–	16	2	–
DF	Paul Wilson	26	1	–	3	–	–	2	–	–	1	1	–	32	2	–
MF	Micky Bell	5	1	–	–	–	–	–	–	–	–	–	–	5	1	–
MF	Steve Berry	41	–	2	5	–	1	2	–	–	3	–	–	51	–	3
MF	Steve Brown	15	6	1	3	–	–	–	–	–	–	–	–	18	6	1
MF	Phil Chard	29	–	2	5	–	–	–	–	–	2	–	1	36	–	3
MF	Warren Donald	20	7	2	2	1	–	2	–	–	1	–	–	25	8	2
MF	Trevor Quow	25	5	1	3	–	–	2	–	–	–	–	–	30	5	1
MF	Bradley Sandeman	20	9	1	2	–	–	1	1	–	3	–	–	26	10	1
MF	David Scope	2	5	–	–	–	–	–	–	–	1	–	–	3	5	–
MF	Martin Singleton	6	4	–	–	2	–	–	–	–	2	–	–	8	6	–
MF	Aidey Thorpe	13	–	3	–	–	–	–	–	–	–	–	–	13	–	3
FW	Bobby Barnes	37	–	18	5	–	1	–	–	–	3	–	1	45	–	20
FW	Darren Collins	33	2	8	4	–	–	1	1	–	1	2	2	39	5	10
FW	Carl Leaburn	9	–	–	–	–	–	–	–	–	–	–	–	9	–	–
Players who left before end of season:
MF	Dean Thomas	31	–	3	5	–	1	2	–	–	3	–	–	41	–	4
FW	Tony Adcock	8	–	3	–	–	–	2	–	1	–	–	–	10	–	4
FW	Paul Culpin	1	3	–	–	–	–	1	1	–	–	–	–	2	4	–
FW	Glen Donegal	1	–	–	–	–	–	–	–	–	–	–	–	1	–	–
FW	Terry McPhillips	–	1	–	–	1	–	–	–	–	–	1	–	–	3	–
