= 1988–89 Northampton Town F.C. season =

Northampton Town
1988–89 season
- Chairman: Derek Banks (until February); Dick Underwood (from February)
- Manager: Graham Carr
- Stadium: County Ground
- Division Three: 20th
- FA Cup: First round
- Littlewoods Cup: Second round
- Sherpa Vans Trophy: Quarter-final (s)
- Top goalscorer: League: Tony Adcock (17); All: Tony Adcock (20)
- Highest home attendance: 6,907 vs Wolverhampton Wanderers
- Lowest home attendance: 2,821 vs Mansfield Town
- Average home league attendance: 3,918

The 1988–89 season was Northampton Town's 92nd season in their history and the second successive season in the Third Division. Alongside competing in Division Three, the club also participated in the FA Cup, League Cup and Football League Trophy.

== Players ==
As of match played 13 May 1989.

Name	Position	Nat.	Place of Birth	Date of Birth (Age)	Apps	Goals	Previous club	Date signed	Fee
Goalkeepers
Peter Gleasure	GK	(England)	Luton	8 October 1960 (aged 28)	332	0	Millwall	March 1983	
Gerald Sylvester	GK	(England)			0	0	Apprentice	Summer 1988	N/A
Defenders
Mick Bodley	CB	(England)	Hayes	14 September 1967 (aged 21)	22	0	Chelsea	12 January 1989	
Paul Flexney	CB	(Scotland)	Glasgow	18 January 1965 (aged 24)	18	0	Clyde	22 August 1988	
Keith McPherson	CB	(England)	Greenwich	11 September 1963 (aged 25)	163	8	West Ham United	23 January 1986	£10,000
Russ Wilcox	CB	(England)	Hemsworth	25 March 1964 (aged 25)	106	9	Frickley Athletic	30 June 1986	£15,000
Wayne Williams	RB	(England)	Telford	17 November 1963 (aged 25)	32	1	Shrewsbury Town	12 January 1988	
Paul Wilson	LB	(England)	Bradford	2 August 1968 (aged 20)	60	2	Norwich City	February 1988	£30,000
Midfielders
Steve Berry	CM	(England)	Liverpool	4 April 1963 (aged 26)	39	3	Aldershot	27 October 1988	£45,000
Warren Donald	CM	(England)	Hillingdon	7 October 1964 (aged 24)	187	12	West Ham United	4 October 1985	£11,000
Trevor Quow	CM	(England)	Peterborough	28 September 1960 (aged 28)	18	1	Gillingham	12 January 1989	
Bradley Sandeman	RM	(England)	Northampton	24 February 1970 (aged 19)	28	1	Apprentice	January 1988	N/A
Martin Singleton (c)	CM	(England)	Banbury	2 August 1963 (aged 25)	46	5	West Bromwich Albion	7 November 1987	£57,500
Forwards
Tony Adcock	FW	(England)	Bethnal Green	27 March 1963 (aged 26)	73	30	Manchester City	January 1988	£85,000 P/E
Darren Collins	FW	(England)	Winchester	24 May 1967 (aged 21)	9	0	Petersfield United	January 1989	
Paul Culpin	FW	(England)	Kirby Muxloe	8 February 1962 (aged 27)	71	26	Coventry City	October 1987	£50,000
Glen Donegal	FW	(England)	Northampton	20 June 1969 (aged 19)	25	4	Apprentice	January 1987	N/A

== Competitions ==
=== Barclays League Division Three ===
==== League table ====
Pos	Team	Pld	W	D	L	GF	GA	GD	Pts	Promotion or relegation
18	Reading	46	15	11	20	68	72	−4	56	
19	Blackpool	46	14	13	19	56	59	−3	55	
20	Northampton Town	46	16	6	24	66	76	−10	54	
21	Southend United (R)	46	13	15	18	56	75	−19	54	Relegation to the Fourth Division
22	Chesterfield (R)	46	14	7	25	51	86	−35	49	Relegation to the Fourth Division

(R) Relegated

==== Results summary ====
Overall								Home						Away					
Pld	W	D	L	GF	GA	GD	Pts	W	D	L	GF	GA	GD	W	D	L	GF	GA	GD
46	16	6	24	66	76	−10	54	11	2	10	41	34	+7	5	4	14	25	42	−17

Last updated: 7 April 2020.

==== League position by match ====
Round	1	2	3	4	5	6	7	8	9	10	11	12	13	14	15	16	17	18	19	20	21	22	23	24	25	26	27	28	29	30	31	32	33	34	35	36	37	38	39	40	41	42	43	44	45	46
Ground	A	H	A	H	A	H	H	A	H	A	H	A	H	A	H	A	A	H	H	A	H	H	H	A	H	A	A	H	A	H	H	A	H	A	H	A	H	A	A	H	H	A	H	A	A	H
Result	D	W	W	W	L	L	W	L	L	L	L	L	L	W	L	L	L	W	L	L	L	W	W	L	L	D	L	W	W	W	W	L	D	D	W	L	D	L	W	L	L	D	W	D	L	L
Position	13	7	3	1	4	8	5	6	8	15	17	17	18	17	17	18	19	18	20	20	20	21	16	19	20	20	21	20	18	17	14	16	17	16	15	16	16	17	17	17	19	19	17	16	16	20

Source: Rothmans Football Yearbook 1988-89
A = Away; H = Home; W = Win; D = Draw; L = Loss

==== Matches ====
Win Draw Loss

27 August 1988 1	Mansfield Town	1–1	Northampton Town	Mansfield
15:00 BST			G.Donegal	Stadium: Field Mill; Attendance: 4,042

3 September 1988 2	Northampton Town	1–0	Brentford	Northampton
15:00 BST	P.Wilson			Stadium: County Ground; Attendance: 4,488; Referee: John Kirkby

10 September 1988 3	Notts County	0–1	Northampton Town	Nottingham
15:00 BST			P.Culpin	Stadium: Meadow Lane; Attendance: 6,340

17 September 1988 4	Northampton Town	3–0	Chesterfield	Northampton
15:00 BST	T.Adcock			Stadium: County Ground; Attendance: 4,520; Referee: Graham Poll

20 September 1988 5	Sheffield United	4–0	Northampton Town	Sheffield
19:45 BST	T.Agana; B.Deane; I.Bryson			Stadium: Bramall Lane; Attendance: 11,904

24 September 1988 6	Northampton Town	1–2	Bristol Rovers	Northampton
15:00 BST	T.Adcock			Stadium: County Ground; Attendance: 3,886

1 October 1988 7	Northampton Town	6–0	Aldershot	Northampton
15:00 BST	P.Culpin; D.Gilbert; T.Adcock			Stadium: County Ground; Attendance: 3,477

4 October 1988 8	Blackpool	3–1	Northampton Town	Blackpool
19:45 BST			D.Gilbert	Stadium: Bloomfield Road; Attendance: 3,034

8 October 1988 9	Northampton Town	1–3	Huddersfield Town	Northampton
15:00 BST	M.Singleton		J.Bent; C.Hutchings; C.Maskell pen.'	Stadium: County Ground; Attendance: 3,975

15 October 1988 10	Swansea City	1–0	Northampton Town	Swansea, Wales
15:00 BST				Stadium: Vetch Field; Attendance: 4,583

22 October 1988 11	Northampton Town	1–3	Bristol City	Northampton
15:00 BST	E.McGoldrick			Stadium: County Ground; Attendance: 3,668

25 October 1988 12	Fulham	3–2	Northampton Town	Fulham, London
19:45 GMT			B.Sandeman; T.Adcock	Stadium: Craven Cottage; Attendance: 4,644

29 October 1988 13	Northampton Town	1–3	Reading	Northampton
15:00 GMT	E.McGoldrick			Stadium: County Ground; Attendance: 4,355

5 November 1988 14	Wigan Athletic	1–3	Northampton Town	Wigan
15:00 GMT			S.Berry; T.Adcock; P.Culpin	Stadium: Springfield Park; Attendance: 2,472; Referee: Alan Seville

8 November 1988 15	Northampton Town	1–3	Port Vale	Northampton
19:30 GMT	P.Culpin		D.Beckford; R.Earle; R.Futcher	Stadium: County Ground; Attendance: 3,796; Referee: Jim Borritt

12 November 1988 16	Cardiff City	1–0	Northampton Town	Cardiff, Wales
15:00 GMT				Stadium: Ninian Park; Attendance: 3,342

26 November 1988 17	Bolton Wanderers	2–1	Northampton Town	Bolton
15:00 GMT	I.Stevens; N.Brookman		P.Culpin	Stadium: Burnden Park; Attendance: 4,446

4 December 1988 18	Northampton Town	3–1	Wolverhampton Wanderers	Northampton
12:00 GMT	W.Williams; D.Thomas; T.Adcock			Stadium: County Ground; Attendance: 6,907; Referee: Joe Timmons

18 December 1988 19	Northampton Town	1–2	Gillingham	Northampton
14:00 GMT	D.Gilbert			Stadium: County Ground; Attendance: 3,829; Referee: Roger Pawley

26 December 1988 20	Southend United	2–1	Northampton Town	Bolton
15:00 GMT			T.Adcock	Stadium: Burnden Park; Attendance: 5,034

31 December 1988 21	Chester City	2–1	Northampton Town	Chester
15:00 GMT			P.Culpin	Stadium: Sealand Road; Attendance: 5,034

2 January 1989 22	Northampton Town	1–0	Preston North End	Northampton
15:00 GMT	D.Thomas			Stadium: County Ground; Attendance: 4,219

7 January 1989 23	Northampton Town	2–0	Bury	Northampton
15:00 GMT	P.Culpin; B.Sandeman			Stadium: County Ground; Attendance: 3,463; Referee: Keith Cooper

14 January 1989 24	Brentford	2–0	Northampton Town	Brentford, London
15:00 GMT	R.Cadette; R.Stanislaus			Stadium: Griffin Park; Attendance: 6,043

21 January 1989 25	Northampton Town	1–3	Notts County	Northampton
15:00 GMT	T.Adcock			Stadium: County Ground; Attendance: 3,704

28 January 1989 26	Chesterfield	1–1	Northampton Town	Chesterfield
15:00 GMT			A.Craig; D.Thomas (red card)	Stadium: Saltergate; Attendance: 3,920

4 February 1989 27	Aldershot	5–1	Northampton Town	Aldershot
15:00 GMT			S.Wignall o.g.'	Stadium: Recreation Ground; Attendance: 2,244

11 February 1989 28	Northampton Town	4–2	Blackpool	Northampton
15:00 GMT	D.Gilbert pen.' T.Adcock; S.Berry			Stadium: County Ground; Attendance: 3,303

18 February 1989 29	Huddersfield Town	1–2	Northampton Town	Huddersfield
15:00 GMT	C.Maskell pen.'		D.Gilbert 45' (pen.); P.Culpin 82'	Stadium: Leeds Road; Attendance: 5,802

25 February 1989 30	Northampton Town	1–0	Swansea City	Northampton
15:00 GMT	D.Thomas			Stadium: County Ground; Attendance: 3,900

28 February 1989 31	Northampton Town	2–1	Fulham	Northampton
19:45 GMT	D.Gilbert; D.Thomas			Stadium: County Ground; Attendance: 3,948

4 March 1989 32	Bristol City	3–1	Northampton Town	Bristol
15:00 GMT			A.Walsh o.g.'	Stadium: Ashton Gate; Attendance: 7,197

11 March 1989 33	Northampton Town	1–1	Wigan Athletic	Northampton
15:00 GMT	T.Adcock			Stadium: County Ground; Attendance: 3,443

15 March 1989 34	Reading	1–1	Northampton Town	Reading
19:45 GMT			K.McPherson	Stadium: Elm Park; Attendance: 3,746

18 March 1989 35	Northampton Town	2–1	Mansfield Town	Northampton
15:00 GMT	D.Thomas; W.Donald			Stadium: County Ground; Attendance: 2,821

25 March 1989 36	Preston North End	3–2	Northampton Town	Preston
15:00 GMT			D.Thomas; T.Adcock	Stadium: Deepdale; Attendance: 9,138

27 March 1989 37	Northampton Town	2–2	Southend United	Northampton
19:45 BST	T.Adcock; P.Culpin			Stadium: County Ground; Attendance: 3,707; Referee: Ron Bridges

1 April 1989 38	Gillingham	1–0	Northampton Town	Gillingham
15:00 BST				Stadium: Priestfield; Attendance: 3,447; Referee: Vic Callow

4 April 1989 39	Bury	0–1	Northampton Town	Bury
19:45 BST			T.Quow	Stadium: Gigg Lane; Attendance: 1,965

8 April 1989 40	Northampton Town	0–2	Chester City	Northampton
15:00 BST				Stadium: County Ground; Attendance: 2,845

15 April 1989 41	Northampton Town	1–2	Sheffield United	Northampton
15:00 BST	K.McPherson		S.Thompson; B.Deane	Stadium: County Ground; Attendance: 5,030; Referee: Peter Jones

22 April 1989 42	Bristol Rovers	1–1	Northampton Town	Bristol
15:00 BST			T.Adcock	Stadium: Eastville Stadium; Attendance: 5,568

29 April 1989 43	Northampton Town	3–0	Cardiff City	Northampton
15:00 BST	D.Thomas; S.Berry			Stadium: County Ground; Attendance: 3,194; Referee: John Kirkby

1 May 1989 44	Port Vale	1–2	Northampton Town	Burslem
15:00 BST	R.Futcher		P.Culpin; D.Thomas	Stadium: Vale Park; Attendance: 5,568

6 May 1989 45	Wolverhampton Wanderers	3–2	Northampton Town	Wolverhampton
15:00 BST			R.Wilcox; G.Donegal	Stadium: Molineux; Attendance: 15,259

13 May 1989 46	Northampton Town	2–3	Bolton Wanderers	Northampton
15:00 BST	T.Adcock; P.Culpin		J.Thomas; S.Storer	Stadium: County Ground; Attendance: 3,655; Referee: Jim Rushton

=== FA Cup ===
19 November 1988 First round	Swansea City	3–1	Northampton Town	Swansea, Wales
15:00 GMT			S.Berry	Stadium: Vetch Field; Attendance: 4,581

=== Littlewoods Cup ===
30 August 1988 First round 1st leg	Colchester United	0–0	Northampton Town	Colchester
19:30 BST		Report		Stadium: Layer Road; Attendance: 1,678; Referee: Phil Don

6 September 1988 First round 2nd leg	Northampton Town	5–0	Colchester United	Northampton
19:30 BST	M.Singleton 9'; P.Culpin 27'; T.Adcock 43', 81'; D.Gilbert 68' (pen.)	Report		Stadium: County Ground; Attendance: 3,953; Referee: David Hutchinson

27 September 1988 Second round 1st leg	Northampton Town	1–1	Charlton Athletic	Northampton
19:30 BST	P.Culpin			Stadium: County Ground; Attendance: 5,290; Referee: Gerald Ashby

11 October 1988 Second round 2nd leg	Charlton Athletic	2–1	Northampton Town	Charlton, London
19:30 BST			P.Wilson	Stadium: The Valley; Attendance: 2,782

=== Sherpa Vans Trophy ===
22 November 1988 Prelim round (s)	Northampton Town	1–1	Cambridge United	Northampton
19:30 GMT	E.McGoldrick			Stadium: County Ground; Attendance: 1,806

21 December 1988 Prelim round (s)	Peterborough United	0–2	Northampton Town	Peterborough
19:30 GMT			T.Adcock; P.Culpin	Stadium: London Road; Attendance: 1,754

17 January 1989 First round (s)	Northampton Town	2–1 (a.e.t.)	Southend United	Northampton
19:30 GMT	S.Berry; S.Westley o.g.' W.Donald (red card)			Stadium: County Ground; Attendance: 2,539; Referee: Paul Danson

21 February 1989 Quarter-final (s)	Wolverhampton Wanderers	3–1 (a.e.t.)	Northampton Town	Wolverhampton
19:30 GMT			o.g.'	Stadium: Molineux Stadium; Attendance: 16,815

=== Appearances and goals ===
Pos	Player	Division Three			FA Cup			League Cup			League Trophy			Total		
Pos	Player	Starts	Sub	Goals	Starts	Sub	Goals	Starts	Sub	Goals	Starts	Sub	Goals	Starts	Sub	Goals
GK	Peter Gleasure	46	–	–	1	–	–	4	–	–	4	–	–	55	–	–
DF	Mick Bodley	20	–	–	–	–	–	–	–	–	2	–	–	22	–	–
DF	Keith McPherson	41	–	2	1	–	–	1	–	–	4	–	–	47	–	2
DF	Bradley Sandeman	8	14	2	1	–	–	1	–	–	2	–	–	12	14	2
DF	Russ Wilcox	11	–	1	–	–	–	–	–	–	–	–	–	11	–	1
DF	Wayne Williams	26	–	1	–	–	–	–	–	–	3	–	–	29	–	1
DF	Paul Wilson	33	6	1	1	–	–	2	–	1	2	1	–	38	7	2
MF	Steve Berry	34	–	3	1	–	1	–	–	–	4	–	1	39	–	5
MF	Warren Donald	37	–	1	–	1	–	4	–	–	4	–	–	45	1	1
MF	Trevor Quow	17	1	1	–	–	–	–	–	–	–	–	–	17	1	1
MF	Martin Singleton	11	–	1	–	–	–	4	–	1	–	–	–	15	–	2
FW	Tony Adcock	46	–	17	1	–	–	4	–	2	4	–	1	–	–	20
FW	Darren Collins	4	4	–	–	–	–	–	–	–	–	1	–	4	5	–
FW	Paul Culpin	33	6	13	1	–	–	3	–	2	4	–	1	41	6	16
FW	Glen Donegal	4	5	2	–	1	–	1	–	–	–	1	–	5	7	2
Players who left before end of season:
DF	Graham Reed	8	–	–	–	–	–	3	–	–	–	–	–	11	–	–
DF	Ian Johnson	1	2	–	–	–	–	–	–	–	1	–	–	2	2	–
DF	Trevor Slack	–	–	–	–	–	–	–	1	–	–	–	–	–	1	–
MF	Doug Anderson	4	1	–	–	–	–	–	–	–	1	–	–	5	1	–
MF	Andy Blair	1	2	–	–	–	–	–	–	–	–	–	–	1	2	–
MF	Gary Cobb	1	–	–	–	–	–	–	–	–	–	–	–	1	–	–
MF	Albert Craig	2	–	1	–	–	–	–	–	–	–	–	–	2	–	1
MF	Jason Garwood	5	1	–	–	–	–	–	–	–	–	–	–	5	1	–
MF	Dave Gilbert	34	–	7	1	–	–	4	–	1	4	–	–	43	–	8
MF	Eddie McGoldrick	22	–	2	1	–	–	4	–	–	2	–	1	29	–	3
FW	David Longhurst	1	1	–	–	–	–	–	–	–	–	–	–	1	1	–
FW	Andy Preece	–	1	–	–	–	–	–	–	–	–	–	–	–	1	–
