= 1986–87 Northampton Town F.C. season =

Northampton Town
1986–87 season
- Chairman: Derek Banks
- Manager: Graham Carr
- Stadium: County Ground
- Division Four: 1st
- FA Cup: Third round
- Littlewoods Cup: First round
- Freight Rover Trophy: First round (s)
- Top goalscorer: League: Richard Hill (29); All: Richard Hill (33)
- Highest home attendance: 11,138 vs Cardiff City
- Lowest home attendance: 3,558 vs Torquay United
- Average home league attendance: 6,316

The 1986–87 season was Northampton Town's 90th season in their history and the tenth successive season in the Fourth Division. Alongside competing in Division Four, the club also participated in the FA Cup, League Cup and Associate Members' Cup.

== Players ==
As of match played 9 May 1987.

Name	Position	Nat.	Place of Birth	Date of Birth (Age)	Apps	Goals	Previous club	Date signed	Fee
Goalkeepers
Peter Gleasure	GK	(England)	Luton	8 October 1960 (aged 26)	223	0	Millwall	March 1983	
Alan Harris	GK	(England)	Nuneaton	13 April 1969 (aged 18)	0	0	Nuneaton Town	Summer 1986	£15,000
Defenders
Bobby Coy	CB	(England)	Birmingham	30 November 1961 (aged 25)	20	0	Chester City	20 August 1986	
David Logan	LB	(England)	Middlesbrough	5 December 1963 (aged 23)	15	1	Mansfield Town	20 February 1987	
Keith McPherson	CB	(England)	Greenwich	11 September 1963 (aged 23)	76	5	West Ham United	23 January 1986	£10,000
Graham Reed	RB	(England)	Doncaster	24 June 1961 (aged 25)	88	2	Frickley Athletic	Summer 1985	£6,000
Russ Wilcox	CB	(England)	Hemsworth	25 March 1964 (aged 23)	41	4	Frickley Athletic	30 June 1986	£15,000
Midfielders
Paul Bunce	W	(England)	Coalville	7 January 1967 (aged 20)	2	1	Leicester City	27 March 1987	
Phil Chard	U	(England)	Corby	16 October 1960 (aged 26)	95	21	Peterborough United	19 August 1985	
Warren Donald	CM	(England)	Hillingdon	7 October 1964 (aged 22)	95	9	West Ham United	4 October 1985	£11,000
Dave Gilbert	W	(England)	Lincoln	22 June 1963 (aged 23)	53	12	Boston United	Summer 1986	
Richard Hill	CM	(England)	Hinckley	20 September 1963 (aged 23)	103	52	Nuneaton Town	Summer 1985	£10,000
Aidy Mann	W	(England)	Northampton	12 July 1967 (aged 19)	96	6	Apprentice	May 1984	N/A
Eddie McGoldrick	W	(England)	Islington	30 April 1965 (aged 22)	48	6	Nuneaton Town	Summer 1986	£15,000
Forwards
Ian Benjamin	FW	(England)	Nottingham	11 December 1961 (aged 25)	161	68	Peterborough United	Summer 1984	
Glen Donegal	FW	(England)	Northampton	20 June 1969 (aged 17)	1	0	Apprentice	January 1987	N/A
Trevor Morley (c)	FW	(England)	Nottingham	20 March 1962 (aged 25)	95	29	Nuneaton Town	Summer 1985	£20,000

== Competitions ==
=== Today League Division Four ===
==== League table ====
Pos	Team	Pld	W	D	L	GF	GA	GD	Pts	Promotion or relegation
1	Northampton Town (C, P)	46	30	9	7	103	53	+50	99	Promotion to the Third Division
2	Preston North End (P)	46	26	12	8	72	47	+25	90	Promotion to the Third Division
3	Southend United (P)	46	25	5	16	68	55	+13	80	Promotion to the Third Division
4	Wolverhampton Wanderers	46	24	7	15	69	50	+19	79	Qualification for the Fourth Division play-offs
5	Colchester United	46	21	7	18	64	56	+8	70	Qualification for the Fourth Division play-offs

(C) Champions; (P) Promoted

==== Results summary ====
Overall								Home						Away					
Pld	W	D	L	GF	GA	GD	Pts	W	D	L	GF	GA	GD	W	D	L	GF	GA	GD
46	30	9	7	103	53	+50	99	20	2	1	56	20	+36	10	7	6	47	33	+14

Last updated: 6 April 2020.

==== League position by match ====
Round	1	2	3	4	5	6	7	8	9	10	11	12	13	14	15	16	17	18	19	20	21	22	23	24	25	26	27	28	29	30	31	32	33	34	35	36	37	38	39	40	41	42	43	44	45	46
Ground	A	H	A	H	H	A	H	A	H	A	H	H	A	A	A	H	A	H	H	H	A	H	H	A	H	A	A	H	A	A	H	H	H	H	A	H	A	A	H	A	H	A	H	A	A	A
Result	D	W	W	W	W	L	W	W	W	W	W	W	W	D	W	W	W	W	D	W	W	W	W	D	W	W	D	L	D	W	W	D	W	W	L	W	L	L	W	L	W	L	W	D	D	W
Position	7	4	4	1	1	2	1	1	1	1	1	1	1	1	1	1	1	1	1	1	1	1	1	1	1	1	1	1	1	1	1	1	1	1	1	1	1	1	1	1	1	1	1	1	1	1

Source: Rothmans Football Yearbook 1986-87
A = Away; H = Home; W = Win; D = Draw; L = Loss

==== Matches ====
Win Draw Loss

23 August 1986 1	Scunthorpe United	2–2	Northampton Town	Scunthorpe
15:00 BST	S.Cammack; L.Hunter		R.Hill; G.Reed	Stadium: Old Show Ground; Attendance: 2,302

31 August 1986 2	Northampton Town	1–0	Torquay United	Northampton
15:00 BST	I.Benjamin			Stadium: County Ground; Attendance: 3,558

6 September 1986 3	Rochdale	1–2	Northampton Town	Rochdale
15:00 BST	S.Taylor		I.Benjamin; P.Chard	Stadium: Spotland Stadium; Attendance: 1,606

14 September 1986 4	Northampton Town	2–1	Peterborough United	Northampton
12:00 BST	T.Morley; P.Chard (pen.)		D.Gregory	Stadium: County Ground; Attendance: 5,517

17 September 1986 5	Northampton Town	2–0	Tranmere Rovers	Northampton
19:30 BST	E.McGoldrick; R.Hill			Stadium: County Ground; Attendance: 3,873

20 September 1986 6	Swansea City	2–1	Northampton Town	Swansea, Wales
15:00 BST	S.McCarthy; I.Love		P.Chard	Stadium: Vetch Field; Attendance: 6,902

27 September 1986 7	Northampton Town	2–1	Wolverhampton Wanderers	Northampton
15:00 BST	T.Morley; R.Hill		A.Mutch	Stadium: County Ground; Attendance: 5,713; Referee: M James

30 September 1986 8	Halifax Town	3–6	Northampton Town	Halifax
19:30 BST	P.Brown; R.Holden; D.Longhurst		W.Donald; R.Hill (pen.); I.Benjamin; P.Chard	Stadium: The Shay; Attendance: 1,034; Referee: Ken Lupton

4 October 1986 9	Northampton Town	4–2	Aldershot	Northampton
15:00 BST	R.Hill; T.Morley; P.Chard		T.Langley; M.Ring	Stadium: County Ground; Attendance: 4,304; Referee: Kelvin Morton

17 October 1986 10	Cambridge United	2–3	Northampton Town	Cambridge
19:30 BST	M.Cooper; D.Crown		K.McPherson; P.Chard (pen.); T.Morley	Stadium: Abbey Stadium; Attendance: 6,283

22 October 1986 11	Northampton Town	4–2	Burnley	Northampton
19:30 BST	T.Morley 29', 37'; I.Benjamin 43'; R.Hill 66'		L.James 64'; A.Hoskin 85'	Stadium: County Ground; Attendance: 5,718

25 October 1986 12	Northampton Town	3–2	Hereford United	Northampton
15:00 BST	T.Morley; I.Benjamin; R.Hill		S.Phillips; S.Devine	Stadium: County Ground; Attendance: 5,336; Referee: David Elleray

27 October 1986 13	Stockport County	0–3	Northampton Town	Stockport
19:30 BST			R.Hill; T.Morley	Stadium: Edgeley Park; Attendance: 1,729

1 November 1986 14	Hartlepool United	3–3	Northampton Town	Hartlepool
15:00 GMT	R.Hogan (pen.); K.Dixon; R.Wilcox (o.g.)		P.Chard (pen.); R.Hill	Stadium: Victoria Park; Attendance: 1,657

4 November 1986 15	Orient	0–1	Northampton Town	Leyton
19:30 GMT			I.Benjamin	Stadium: Brisbane Road; Attendance: 3,496; Referee: John Martin

8 November 1986 16	Northampton Town	3–1	Preston North End	Northampton
15:00 GMT	I.Benjamin; K.McPherson; R.Hill		S.Taylor	Stadium: County Ground; Attendance: 6,537; Referee: Jim Ashworth

28 November 1986 17	Crewe Alexandra	0–5	Northampton Town	Crewe
19:30 GMT			I.Benjamin; K.McPherson; R.Hill	Stadium: Gresty Road; Attendance: 2,331

2 December 1986 18	Northampton Town	4–0	Exeter City	Northampton
19:30 GMT	T.Morley; E.McGoldrick; R.Hill			Stadium: County Ground; Attendance: 6,639

13 December 1986 19	Northampton Town	2–2	Wrexham	Northampton
15:00 GMT	R.Wilcox; I.Benjamin		J.Steel	Stadium: County Ground; Attendance: 6,070

21 December 1986 20	Northampton Town	3–1	Lincoln City	Northampton
15:00 GMT	D.Gilbert (pen.); E.McGoldrick; I.Benjamin		G.Lund	Stadium: County Ground; Attendance: 7,063; Referee: Keren Barratt

26 December 1986 21	Southend United	0–4	Northampton Town	Southend-on-Sea
15:00 GMT			R.Hill; I.Benjamin; W.Donald; D.Gilbert (red card)	Stadium: Roots Hall; Attendance: 8,541

28 December 1986 22	Northampton Town	4–1	Cardiff City	Northampton
15:00 GMT	I.Benjamin; D.Gilbert (pen.); T.Morley; R.Hill		C.Pike	Stadium: County Ground; Attendance: 11,138; Referee: Malcolm Cotton

1 January 1987 23	Northampton Town	3–2	Colchester United	Northampton
15:00 GMT	I.Benjamin 50'; T.Morley 56'; D.Gilbert 86' (pen.)	Report	T.Adcock 52', 63'	Stadium: County Ground; Attendance: 8,215; Referee: D Vickers

3 January 1987 24	Exeter City	1–1	Northampton Town	Exeter
15:00 GMT	S.Biggins		R.Hill	Stadium: St James Park; Attendance: 4,331

24 January 1987 25	Northampton Town	5–0	Rochdale	Northampton
15:00 GMT	P.McMenemy; P.Chard; E.McGoldrick; R.Hill			Stadium: County Ground; Attendance: 5,484

31 January 1987 26	Peterborough United	0–1	Northampton Town	Peterborough
15:00 GMT			I.Benjamin	Stadium: London Road; Attendance: 7,911

6 February 1987 27	Tranmere Rovers	1–1	Northampton Town	Birkenhead
15:00 GMT	I.Muir		R.Hill	Stadium: Prenton Park; Attendance: 2,583

14 February 1987 28	Northampton Town	0–1	Swansea City	Northampton
15:00 GMT			C.Pascoe 87'	Stadium: County Ground; Attendance: 8,288

21 February 1987 29	Wolverhampton Wanderers	1–1	Northampton Town	Wolverhampton
15:00 GMT	M.Holmes		P.Chard	Stadium: Molineux Stadium; Attendance: 9,991

24 February 1987 30	Torquay United	0–1	Northampton Town	Torquay
19:30 GMT			W.Donald	Stadium: Plainmoor; Attendance: 1,780

27 February 1987 31	Northampton Town	1–0	Halifax Town	Northampton
19:30 GMT	I.Benjamin			Stadium: County Ground; Attendance: 6,351

4 March 1987 32	Northampton Town	1–1	Hartlepool United	Northampton
19:30 GMT	I.Benjamin		R.Hogan	Stadium: County Ground; Attendance: 5,470

11 March 1987 33	Northampton Town	1–0	Scunthorpe United	Northampton
19:30 GMT	T.Morley			Stadium: County Ground; Attendance: 5,352

14 March 1987 34	Northampton Town	3–0	Cambridge United	Northampton
15:00 GMT	D.Gilbert (pen.) (pen.); R.Hill			Stadium: County Ground; Attendance: 6,201

17 March 1987 35	Burnley	2–1	Northampton Town	Burnley
19:30 GMT	A.Hoskin 39'; J.Gallagher 70'		C.Henry	Stadium: Turf Moor

21 March 1987 36	Northampton Town	2–1	Stockport County	Northampton
15:00 GMT	P.Chard		W.Entwistle	Stadium: County Ground; Attendance: 5,466

3 April 1987 37	Preston North End	1–0	Northampton Town	Preston
19:30 BST	G.Brazil			Stadium: Deepdale; Attendance: 16,566

8 April 1987 38	Hereford United	3–2	Northampton Town	Hereford
19:30 BST	S.Phillips; S.Spooner; O.Kearns		P.Chard; T.Morley	Stadium: Edgar Street; Attendance: 2,758

12 April 1987 39	Northampton Town	2–0	Orient	Northampton
15:00 BST	D.Gilbert; K.McPherson			Stadium: County Ground; Attendance: 6,711

17 April 1987 40	Colchester United	3–1	Northampton Town	Colchester
19:30 BST	R.Wilkins 39'; N.Chatterton 57' (pen.); R.Hedman 76'	Report	D.Logan 15'	Stadium: Layer Road; Attendance: 3,676; Referee: Colin Downey

20 April 1987 41	Northampton Town	2–1	Southend United	Northampton
15:00 BST	R.Hill; K.McPherson		R.Cadette	Stadium: County Ground; Attendance: 7,383; Referee: Joe Worrall

26 April 1987 42	Lincoln City	3–1	Northampton Town	Lincoln
15:00 BST	J.Gilligan; W.Gamble; P.Chard (o.g.)		E.McGoldrick	Stadium: Sincil Bank; Attendance: 4,012

29 April 1987 43	Northampton Town	2–1	Crewe Alexandra	Northampton
19:30 BST	D.Gilbert (pen.); R.Hill		P.Bodak	Stadium: County Ground; Attendance: 8,890

4 May 1987 44	Cardiff City	1–1	Northampton Town	Cardiff, Wales
15:00 BST	E.Curtis		I.Benjamin	Stadium: Ninian Park; Attendance: 4,012

6 May 1987 45	Aldershot	3–3	Northampton Town	Aldershot
19:30 BST	I.McDonald; A.King; G.Johnson		D.Gilbert; I.Benjamin; T.Morley	Stadium: Recreation Ground; Attendance: 3,377

9 May 1987 46	Wrexham	1–3	Northampton Town	Wrexham, Wales
15:00 BST	S.Buxton		P.Bunce; T.Morley	Stadium: Racecourse Ground; Attendance: 2,709

=== FA Cup ===
16 November 1986 First round	Northampton Town	3–0	Peterborough United	Northampton
15:00 GMT	E.McGoldrick; D.Gilbert (pen.); I.Benjamin			Stadium: County Ground; Attendance: 9,114; Referee: Jim Ashworth

5 December 1986 Second round	Southend United	4–4	Northampton Town	Southend-on-Sea
19:45 GMT	R.Cadette; R.McDonough		W.Donald; R.Hill; I.Benjamin	Stadium: Roots Hall; Attendance: 7,412; Referee: Ray Lewis

16 December 1986 Second round (r)	Northampton Town	3–2	Southend United	Northampton
19:45 GMT	I.Benjamin; D.Gilbert (pen.) (pen.)		G.Pennyfather; R.Cadette	Stadium: County Ground; Attendance: 10,603; Referee: Ray Lewis

21 January 1987 Third round	Newcastle United	2–1	Northampton Town	Newcastle upon Tyne
19:30 GMT	P.Goddard 3'; A.Thomas 68'	Report	R.Hill 67'	Stadium: St James' Park; Attendance: 23,177

=== Littlewoods Cup ===
25 August 1986 First round 1st leg	Gillingham	1–0	Northampton Town	Gillingham
19:30 BST	M.Weatherly			Stadium: Priestfield; Attendance: 2,948

3 September 1986 First round 2nd leg	Northampton Town	2–2	Gillingham	Northampton
19:30 BST	B.Coy; I.Benjamin		T.Cascarino	Stadium: County Ground; Attendance: 2,724; Referee: Howard Taylor

=== Freight Rover Trophy ===
Group 2
Team	Pld	W	D	L	GF	GA	GD	Pts
Gillingham	2	2	0	0	6	0	+6	6
Northampton Town	2	1	0	1	3	1	+2	3
Notts County	2	0	0	2	0	8	−8	0

16 December 1986 Prelim round (s)	Gillingham	1–0	Northampton Town	Gillingham
19:30 GMT	H.Pritchard			Stadium: Priestfield Stadium; Attendance: 2,046

5 January 1987 Prelim round (s)	Northampton Town	3–0	Notts County	Northampton
19:30 GMT	R.Hill; D.Gilbert; A.Mann			Stadium: County Ground; Attendance: 3,578

26 January 1987 First round (s)	Fulham	3–2	Northampton Town	Fulham
19:30 GMT	K.Achampong; G.Barnett; J.Marshall		P.Chard; I.Benjamin	Stadium: Craven Cottage; Attendance: 2,080

=== Appearances and goals ===
Pos	Player	Division Four			FA Cup			League Cup			League Trophy			Total		
Pos	Player	Starts	Sub	Goals	Starts	Sub	Goals	Starts	Sub	Goals	Starts	Sub	Goals	Starts	Sub	Goals
GK	Peter Gleasure	46	–	–	4	–	–	2	–	–	3	–	–	55	–	–
GK	Alan Harris	–	–	–	–	–	–	–	–	–	–	–	–	–	–	–
DF	Mark Bushell	–	–	–	–	–	–	–	–	–	–	–	–	–	–	–
DF	Lee Carter	–	–	–	–	–	–	–	–	–	–	–	–	–	–	–
DF	Bobby Coy	15	2	–	–	–	–	2	–	1	1	–	–	18	2	1
DF	David Logan	15	–	1	–	–	–	–	–	–	–	–	–	15	–	1
DF	Keith McPherson	46	–	5	4	–	–	2	–	–	3	–	–	55	–	5
DF	Graham Reed	36	1	1	4	–	–	2	–	–	2	–	–	44	1	1
DF	Russ Wilcox	34	1	1	3	–	–	–	–	–	3	–	–	40	1	1
MF	Paul Bunce	1	1	1	–	–	–	–	–	–	–	–	–	1	1	1
MF	Phil Chard	39	1	12	3	–	–	2	–	–	1	–	1	45	1	13
MF	Warren Donald	41	–	3	3	–	1	1	–	–	2	–	–	47	–	4
MF	Dave Gilbert	45	–	8	3	–	3	2	–	–	3	–	1	53	–	12
MF	Richard Hill	45	–	29	4	–	3	2	–	–	3	–	1	54	–	33
MF	Aidy Mann	7	1	–	1	1	–	1	–	–	1	2	1	10	4	1
MF	Eddie McGoldrick	35	4	5	4	–	1	2	–	–	3	–	–	44	4	6
FW	Ian Benjamin	46	–	18	4	–	3	2	–	1	3	–	1	55	–	23
FW	Glen Donegal	–	–	–	–	–	–	–	–	–	–	1	–	–	1	–
FW	Trevor Morley	37	–	16	4	–	–	2	–	–	2	–	–	45	–	16
Players who left before end of season:
DF	Irvin Gernon	9	–	–	3	–	–	–	–	–	1	–	–	13	–	–
MF	Keith Gorman	–	–	–	–	1	–	–	–	–	–	1	–	–	2	–
MF	Charlie Henry	4	–	1	–	–	–	–	–	–	–	–	–	4	–	1
MF	John Millar	1	–	–	1	–	–	–	–	–	2	–	–	4	–	–
MF	Mark Schiavi	–	1	–	–	–	–	–	–	–	–	–	–	–	1	–
FW	Paul McMenemy	4	–	2	–	–	–	–	–	–	–	–	–	4	–	2
FW	Paul Sugrue	–	–	–	–	–	–	–	–	–	–	–	–	–	–	–

== Transfers ==
=== Transfers in ===
Date from	Position	Nationality	Name	From	Fee
Summer 1986	CB	(England)	Bobby Coy	(England) Chester City	
Summer 1986	W	(England)	Dave Gilbert	(England) Boston United	
Summer 1986	GK	(England)	Alan Harris	(England) Nuneaton Town	Joint £15,000
Summer 1986	W	(England)	Eddie McGoldrick	(England) Nuneaton Town	Joint £15,000
30 June 1986	CB	(England)	Russ Wilcox	(England) Frickley Athletic	£15,000
20 February 1987	LB	(England)	David Logan	(England) Mansfield Town	

=== Loans in ===
Date from	Position	Nationality	Name	From	Date until
November 1986	LB	(England)	Irvin Gernon	(England) Ipswich Town	January 1987
November 1986	W	(England)	Keith Gorman	(England) Ipswich Town	December 1986
January 1987	LB	(England)	John Millar	(England) Chelsea	January 1987
January 1987	FW	(England)	Paul McMenemy	(England) West Ham United	February 1987
February 1987	AM	(England)	Charlie Henry	(England) Swindon Town	March 1987

=== Transfers out ===
Date from	Position	Nationality	Name	To	Fee
Summer 1986	RB	(England)	Paul Curtis	(England) Corby Town	
Summer 1986	CB	(Wales)	Russell Lewis	(England) Kettering Town	
August 1986	FW	(England)	Paul Sugrue	(England) Newport County	
September 1986	AM	(England)	Mark Schiavi	(England) Cambridge United	

=== Loans out ===
Date from	Position	Nationality	Name	To	Date until
March 1987	W	(England)	Aidy Mann	(England) Torquay United	End of Season
	FB	(England)	Lee Carter	(England) Gravesend & Northfleet	
