= Bradley Sandeman =

English footballer (born 1970)

Personal information
- Full name: Bradley Robert Sandeman
- Date of birth: 24 February 1970 (age 56)
- Place of birth: Northampton, England
- Height: 5 ft 11 in (1.80 m)
- Positions: Right-back; midfielder

Youth career
- 1986–1988: Northampton Town

Senior career*
Years	Team	Apps	(Gls)
1988–1991	Northampton Town	58	(3)
1991–1992	Maidstone United	57	(8)
1992–1996	Port Vale	69	(1)
1996–1997	Rotherham United	21	(2)
1997	Hereford United	7	(0)
1997–????	Kettering Town		
2000–2001	Leek Town	44	(5)
2001–2002	Hyde United	0	(0)
2002–2004	Witton Albion		
2004–2005	Kidsgrove Athletic		
2005–200?	Dover Athletic		
Total		256	(19)

Managerial career
- 2003: Witton Albion (caretaker)
- * Club domestic league appearances and goals

Bradley Robert Sandeman (born 24 February 1970) is an English former footballer who made 249 league and cup appearances in a nine-year career in the Football League.

A versatile passer of the ball, he began his career at Northampton Town in 1988. He was sold to Maidstone United for £10,000 in February 1991, before he was allowed to join Port Vale on a free transfer in July 1992. He helped the club to win promotion out of the Second Division in 1993–94, before he was given a free transfer to Rotherham United in May 1996. He moved on to Hereford United in March 1997 and later had spells with non-League clubs Northwich Victoria, Kettering Town, Leek Town, Hyde United, Kidsgrove Athletic, Witton Albion and Dover Athletic.

== Playing career ==
=== Northampton Town ===
Sandeman started his career at Northampton Town under the management of Graham Carr in 1986. The "Cobblers" avoided relegation out of the Third Division in 1988–89 only due to their superior goal difference to Southend United. They failed to avoid the drop into the Fourth Division in 1989–90, which led to Carr being sacked and replaced by Theo Foley.

=== Maidstone United ===
Sandeman left the County Ground in February 1991, having been sold to league rivals Maidstone United for a £10,000 fee; the move reunited him with former boss Graham Carr. The "Stones" finished in the lower half of the table in both 1990–91 and 1991–92. He left the club just months before its collapse.

=== Port Vale ===
He joined Port Vale in July 1992, with manager John Rudge looking to add strength in depth to help with the push for promotion out of the Second Division. He was played at wing-back in 1992–93 until he picked up a thigh injury in February, which required an operation. This caused him to miss both the 1993 Football League Trophy final and the 1993 Second Division play-off final at Wembley. He was used sparingly following his recovery, leaving him to play a limited role in the 1993–94 promotion campaign until he re-gained his first-team spot in May 1994. He was a first-team regular in the First Division in 1994–95, before he fell out of favour once again in July 1995 following the arrival of Andy Hill. The 1995–96 season was his last at Vale Park, and was not picked to play in the final of the Anglo-Italian Cup. He was given a free transfer to Rotherham United in May 1996.

=== Rotherham United ===
Originally signed to play at right-back, he was soon pushed further forward into midfield. The "Millers" suffered relegation out of the Second Division in 1996–97 under Danny Bergara. However, Sandeman had left Millmoor for Hereford United in March 1997.

=== Later career ===
He made just seven appearances for the "Bulls", and left the club in the summer after the Edgar Street club were relegated to the Conference under Graham Turner. He spent the first half of the 1997–98 season with Northwich Victoria, before joining Conference rivals Kettering Town in December 1997, who were managed by former teammate Steve Berry. He later combined his duties as a postal worker with playing semi-professional football. He signed with Leek Town in July 2000 and scored seven goals in 55 appearances in the 2000–01 season as the "Blues" were relegated out of the Northern Premier League Premier Division; he was voted as the club's Player of the Season. He then moved on to Hyde United, but did not make an appearance for the "Tigers". He served Witton Albion as caretaker manager in August 2003, winning all four matches. He also played 37 games in the 2002–03 season and 26 games in the 2003–04 season. He joined Kidsgrove Athletic in July 2004. He signed with Dover Athletic in February 2005 after being recruited by Clive Walker.

== Coaching career ==
In 2008, he joined Kent League club Tunbridge Wells, becoming assistant manager at the club the following year. He helped the "Wells" to reach the 2013 FA Vase final. He was appointed as a coach at Lordswood in July 2015. He followed manager James Collins to help coach Cray Valley Paper Mills in 2016.

== Style of play ==
Sandeman was a versatile player who played in multiple positions and was recognized for his passing skills, and a committed tackler.

== Career statistics ==
=== Playing statistics ===
Appearances and goals by club, season and competition
Club	Season	League			FA Cup		Other		Total	
Club	Season	Division	Apps	Goals	Apps	Goals	Apps	Goals	Apps	Goals
Northampton Town	1987–88	Third Division	2	0	0	0	0	0	2	0
Northampton Town	1988–89	Third Division	22	2	1	0	3	0	26	2
Northampton Town	1989–90	Third Division	29	1	2	0	5	0	36	1
Northampton Town	1990–91	Fourth Division	5	0	0	0	4	0	9	0
Northampton Town	Total		58	3	3	0	12	0	73	3
Maidstone United	1990–91	Fourth Division	20	1	0	0	0	0	20	1
Maidstone United	1991–92	Fourth Division	37	7	2	0	4	1	43	8
Maidstone United	Total		57	8	2	0	4	1	63	9
Port Vale	1992–93	Second Division	22	1	3	0	4	0	29	1
Port Vale	1993–94	Second Division	9	0	1	0	0	0	10	0
Port Vale	1994–95	First Division	37	0	0	0	4	0	41	0
Port Vale	1995–96	First Division	1	0	0	0	1	0	2	0
Port Vale	Total		69	1	4	0	9	0	82	1
Rotherham United	1996–97	Second Division	21	2	1	0	2	0	24	2
Hereford United	1996–97	Third Division	7	0	0	0	0	0	7	0
Leek Town	2000–01	Northern Premier League; Premier Division	44	5	4	2	7	0	55	7
Career total			256	19	14	2	34	1	304	22

=== Managerial statistics ===
Managerial record by team and tenure
Team	From	To	Record					Ref
Team	From	To	P	W	D	L	Win %	Ref
Witton Albion (caretaker)	2003	2003	4	4	0	0	100.0	
Total			4	4	0	0	100.0	—

== Honours ==
Individual

- Leek Town F.C. Player of the Season: 2000–01

Port Vale

- Football League Second Division second-place promotion: 1993–94
