= Aidy =

Aidy is a given name. Notable people with this name include:

- Aidy Bryant (born 1987), American actress and comedian
- Aidy Boothroyd (born 1971), English footballer and manager
- Aidy Mann (born 1967), English footballer and coach
- Aidy Mariappa (born 1986), English footballer
- Aidy White (born 1991), English-born Irish footballer

== See also ==
- Aidi (disambiguation)
