= Aidi (disambiguation) =

Aidi is a dog breed.

Aidi or AIDI may also refer to:

- Aidi (footballer), Chinese football player

== See also ==
- Ai Di (disambiguation), Chinese emperors
- Aidy
