= Emperor Ai =

Emperor Ai (哀帝; Aidi; "The Lamentable Emperor") may refer to:

- Emperor Ai of Han (27BC–1BC, reigned 7BC–1BC), emperor of the Western Han dynasty
- Li Ban (288–334, reigned in 334), brief emperor of the Cheng-Han state, also known as Emperor Ai of Cheng-Han
- Emperor Ai of Jin (341–365, reigned 361–365), emperor of the Eastern Jin dynasty
- Emperor Ai of Tang (892–908, reigned 904–907), emperor of the Tang dynasty

== See also ==
- Aidi (disambiguation)
