= Russ Wilcox =

English footballer (born 1964)

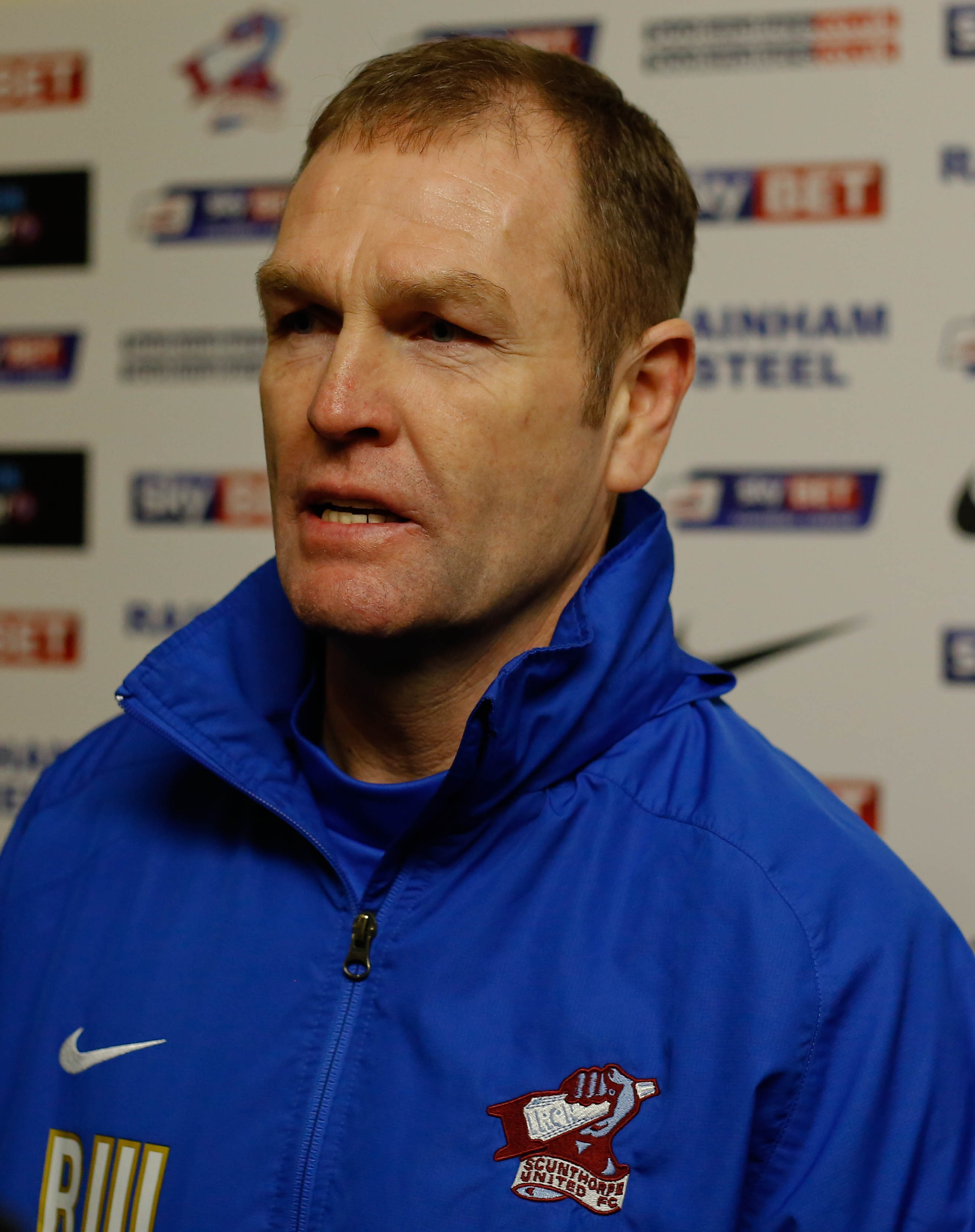
- Wilcox as Scunthorpe United manager in 2014

Personal information
- Full name: Russell Wilcox
- Date of birth: 25 March 1964 (age 62)
- Place of birth: Hemsworth, England
- Height: 6 ft 0 in (1.83 m)
- Position: Defender

Team information
- Current team: Gainsborough Trinity (manager)

Senior career*
Years	Team	Apps	(Gls)
1980–1981	Doncaster Rovers	1	(0)
1981–1982	Cambridge United	0	(0)
1982–1986	Frickley Athletic	129	(19)
1986–1990	Northampton Town	138	(9)
1990–1993	Hull City	100	(7)
1993–1995	Doncaster Rovers	81	(6)
1995–1997	Preston North End	62	(1)
1997–2003	Scunthorpe United	118	(4)
Total		629	(46)

International career
1986	England semi-pro	3	(1)

Managerial career
- 2004: Scunthorpe United (caretaker)
- 2013–2014: Scunthorpe United
- 2014–2015: York City
- 2020: Scunthorpe United
- 2022–2023: Farsley Celtic
- 2023–: Gainsborough Trinity
- * Club domestic league appearances and goals

Russell Wilcox (born 25 March 1964) is an English football coach and former player who is manager of Gainsborough Trinity.

Wilcox played as a defender between 1980 and 2003 and spent the final six years of his career with Scunthorpe United which is where he began working under Brian Laws. Wilcox would act as Laws' assistant at Glanford Park from 2003 to 2006 before following him on to further jobs at Sheffield Wednesday and Burnley. The pair returned to Scunthorpe in 2012 and in November 2013 Wilcox succeeded Laws as manager of the club, taking Scunthorpe to promotion. A poor start to the following year's campaign saw Wilcox sacked from Scunthorpe and he was then recruited by York City. Another poor start to a season saw Wilcox sacked by York City in October 2015. Wilcox came back to Scunthorpe again as the caretaker manager until the end of the 2019–20 season following the dismissal of Paul Hurst.

== Club career ==
Wilcox was born in Hemsworth, West Riding of Yorkshire. He started his career with Doncaster Rovers as an apprentice, and made his first team debut aged 17 when starting the last match of their 1980–81 Fourth Division promotion winning season, a 1–1 away draw with Mansfield Town on 6 May 1981. His progress the following season was disrupted through injury, and he left for a brief spell with Cambridge United of the Second Division. Wilcox dropped into non-League football to play for Alliance Premier League club Frickley Athletic during 1982–83.

He returned to the professional game when he joined Fourth Division club Northampton Town for a £15,000 fee on 30 June 1986. He later played for Hull City, Preston North End and Scunthorpe United. He played the majority of his career at Scunthorpe, where he was signed by Brian Laws in 1997. He eventually became player-assistant manager to Laws in 1999 after the win at Wembley Stadium in the play-off final against Leyton Orient.

== International career ==
Wilcox earned two caps and scored one goal for the England national semi-pro team, in matches against the Republic of Ireland and Wales in 1986.

== Coaching and managerial career ==
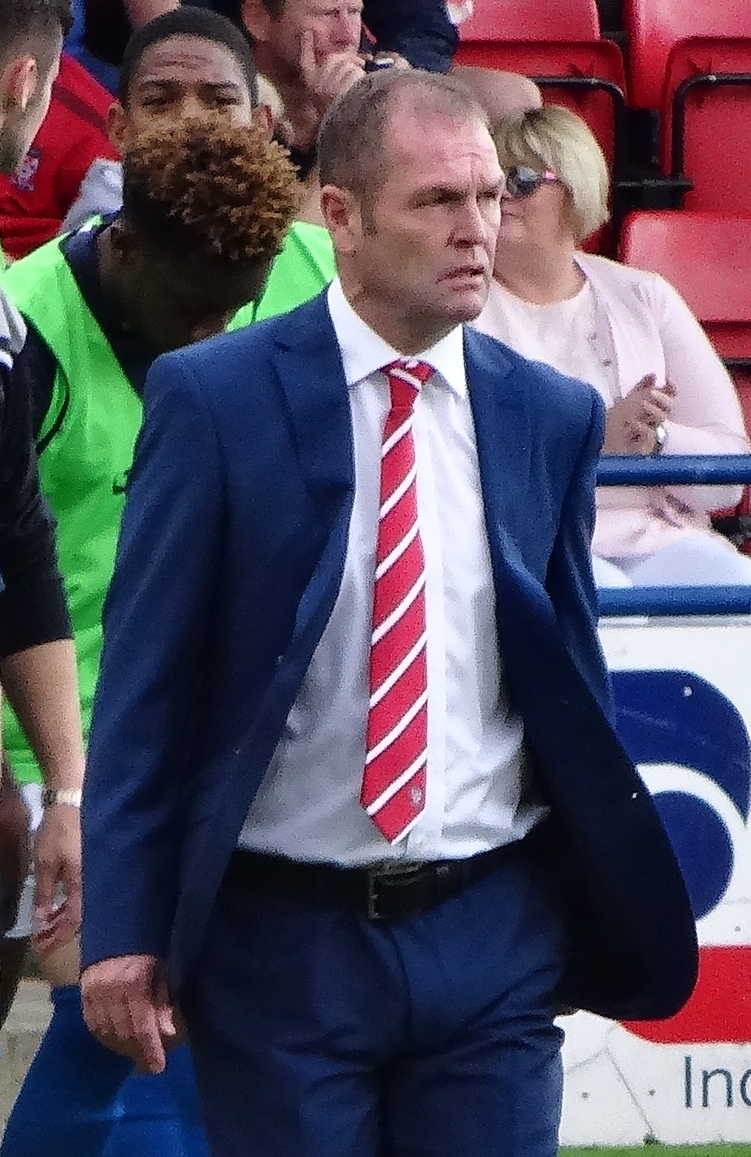
Wilcox as York City manager in 2015

When Brian Laws was sacked in 2004, Wilcox took temporary control of the Glanford Park club for four games, until Laws was reinstated. When Laws returned to the club, Wilcox reverted to his original role of assistant manager. In 2006, Laws left Scunthorpe when he was appointed manager of Sheffield Wednesday, Wilcox shortly followed him to take up the assistant manager's role at Hillsborough Stadium.

On 13 January 2010, he joined Premier League club Burnley as assistant manager, yet again moving to work under Brian Laws. He left Burnley in December 2010.

On 30 November 2011 at a fans forum, Wilcox was named as the new assistant manager of League One club AFC Bournemouth, working alongside manager Lee Bradbury. On 30 October 2012 he and Laws returned to manage League One side Scunthorpe United replacing former manager Alan Knill who was sacked following a string of poor results and poor performances. This will be the third time he and Brian Laws have worked together at Scunthorpe. Laws was dismissed on 20 November 2013 with Wilcox taking over on a caretaker basis. On 24 December 2013 Wilcox was confirmed as permanent manager of the club on a 12-month rolling contract.

On 12 April 2014, Wilcox broke the record for the longest unbeaten run at the beginning of a managerial reign, with a draw against Bury being his 26th game in charge without defeat. In total, Wilcox managed 28 consecutive games without defeat, with his first loss coming in the penultimate game of the season on 26 April 2014 away to Exeter City. Results elsewhere meant that Scunthorpe secured promotion on that day regardless. Scunthorpe won just two of their first eleven matches back in League One, which resulted in Wilcox being sacked on 8 October 2014.

A week after leaving Scunthorpe Wilcox was appointed as the new manager of League Two club York City on 15 October 2014, following the resignation of Nigel Worthington. He was sacked on 26 October 2015, with York fourth-bottom of the table after a run of nine league matches without a win.

After the departure of Paul Hurst in January 2020, Wilcox was appointed caretaker manager, and remained until the end of the season. He was appointed manager of Farsley Celtic in February 2022.

On 17 May 2023 Farsley Celtic reported that Wilcox had left his position as Manager with immediate effect.

On 19 September 2023, Wilcox was appointed manager of Northern Premier League Premier Division club Gainsborough Trinity.

== Personal life ==
His son Joe Wilcox, born 1989, is a former professional footballer, who was a trainee at Scunthorpe United before playing in non-League football.

== Career statistics ==
Appearances and goals by club, season and competition
Club	Season	League			FA Cup		League Cup		Other		Total	
Club	Season	Division	Apps	Goals	Apps	Goals	Apps	Goals	Apps	Goals	Apps	Goals
Doncaster Rovers	1980–81	Fourth Division	1	0	0	0	0	0	—		1	0
Frickley Athletic	1982–83	Alliance Premier League	17	0			—				17	0
Frickley Athletic	1983–84	Alliance Premier League	36	6			—				36	6
Frickley Athletic	1984–85	Alliance Premier League	36	1			—				36	1
Frickley Athletic	1985–86	Alliance Premier League	40	12			—				40	12
Frickley Athletic	Total		129	19			—				129	19
Northampton Town	1986–87	Fourth Division	35	1	3	0	0	0	3 (Note: Appearances in Associate Members' Cup)	0	41	1
Northampton Town	1987–88	Third Division	46	4	2	0	4	0	2	0	54	4
Northampton Town	1988–89	Third Division	11	1	0	0	0	0	0	0	11	1
Northampton Town	1989–90	Third Division	46	3	5	0	2	0	3	1	56	4
Northampton Town	Total		138	9	10	0	6	0	8	1	162	10
Hull City	1990–91	Second Division	31	1	0	0	2	0	1 (Note: Appearance in Full Members' Cup)	0	34	1
Hull City	1991–92	Third Division	40	4	3	1	3	0	2	0	48	5
Hull City	1992–93	Second Division	29	2	2	0	0	0	3 (Note: Appearance(s) in Football League Trophy)	0	34	2
Hull City	Total		100	7	5	1	5	0	6	0	116	8
Doncaster Rovers	1993–94	Third Division	40	2	2	0	2	1	0	0	44	3
Doncaster Rovers	1994–95	Third Division	37	4	1	0	1	0	3	0	42	4
Doncaster Rovers	1995–96	Third Division	4	0	—		2	1	—		6	1
Doncaster Rovers	Total		81	6	3	0	5	2	3	0	92	8
Preston North End	1995–96	Third Division	27	1	1	1	—		1	0	29	2
Preston North End	1996–97	Second Division	35	0	2	0	4	0	1	0	42	0
Preston North End	Total		62	1	3	1	4	0	2	0	71	2
Scunthorpe United	1997–98	Third Division	31	2	4	2	3	0	3	0	41	4
Scunthorpe United	1998–99	Third Division	28	1	2	0	2	0	3 (Note: Appearances in Third Division play-offs)	0	35	1
Scunthorpe United	1999–2000	Second Division	14	0	0	0	1	0	2	0	17	0
Scunthorpe United	2000–01	Third Division	36	1	5	0	2	0	0	0	43	1
Scunthorpe United	2001–02	Third Division	9	0	0	0	1	0	0	0	10	0
Scunthorpe United	2002–03	Third Division	0	0	0	0	0	0	0	0	0	0
Scunthorpe United	Total		118	4	11	2	9	0	8	0	146	6
Career total			629	46	32	4	29	2	27	1	717	53

== Managerial statistics ==
As of 5 September 2026

Managerial record by team and tenure
Team	From	To	Record					Ref.
Team	From	To	P	W	D	L	Win %	Ref.
Scunthorpe United (caretaker)	25 March 2004	15 April 2004	4	0	2	2	0.0	
Scunthorpe United	20 November 2013	8 October 2014	45	18	16	11	40.0	
York City	15 October 2014	26 October 2015	54	13	20	21	24.1	
Scunthorpe United (interim)	29 January 2020	30 June 2020	7	2	1	4	28.6	
Farsley Celtic	2 February 2022	17 May 2023	72	20	22	30	27.8	
Gainsborough Trinity	17 September 2023	Present	149	73	29	47	49.0	
Total			331	126	90	115	38.1	

== Honours ==
=== As a player ===
Northampton Town

- Football League Fourth Division: 1986–87

Preston North End

- Football League Third Division: 1995–96

Scunthorpe United

- Football League Third Division play-offs: 1999

Individual

- PFA Team of the Year: 1994–95 Third Division, 1995–96 Third Division
