= Peter Bodak =

English footballer

Personal information
- Full name: Peter John Bodak
- Date of birth: 12 August 1961 (age 65)
- Place of birth: Birmingham, England
- Height: 5 ft 8 in (1.73 m)
- Position: Winger

Youth career
- Coventry City

Senior career*
| Years | Team | Apps | (Gls) |
| 1980–1982 | Coventry City | 32 | (5) |
| 1982 | Manchester United | 0 | (0) |
| 1982–1983 | Manchester City | 14 | (1) |
| 1983–1985 | Seiko | | |
| 1985–1986 | Royal Antwerp | | |
| 1986–1988 | Crewe Alexandra | 53 | (7) |
| 1988–1989 | Swansea City | 31 | (4) |
| 1989–1990 | Happy Valley | | |
| 1990–1991 | Walsall | 4 | (1) |
| 1994–1996 | Sutton Coldfield Town | | |
- * Club domestic league appearances and goals

Peter John Bodak (born 12 August 1961) is an English former footballer who played as a winger. He made over 130 league appearances in the English football league between 1980 and 1991, most notably for Coventry City, Crewe Alexandria and Swansea City.

== Career ==
Born in Birmingham, Bodak was a product of the Coventry City youth system and helped them reach the League Cup semi-finals in 1980–81. He transferred to Manchester United in July 1982, but was there for just five months before joining rivals Manchester City without having played for United's first team. At the end of the season, he moved to Hong Kong to play for Seiko, followed by another move to Belgium with Royal Antwerp a year later.

He returned to England with Crewe Alexandra in December 1986, followed by a move to Swansea City in March 1988, where he scored four goals in 31 league appearances, as well as featuring in their 1987–88 Fourth Division play-off final triumph. At the end of the 1988–89 season, he moved back to Hong Kong with Happy Valley.

He subsequently played for Walsall, Sutton Coldfield Town and Atherstone United.
