= Andy Pilling =

English footballer

Personal information
- Full name: Andrew James Pilling
- Date of birth: 30 June 1969 (age 57)
- Place of birth: Wigan, England
- Position: Midfielder

Senior career*
Years	Team	Apps	(Gls)
1985–1986	Preston North End	1	(0)
1987–1993	Wigan Athletic	156	(20)
1993-1994	Southport	5	(0)
Total		162	(20)
- * Club domestic league appearances and goals

Andy Pilling (born 30 June 1969) is an English retired footballer who played in the Football League for Preston North End and Wigan Athletic.
