= Ian Benjamin =

English footballer (born 1961)

Personal information
- Full name: Ian Tracey Benjamin
- Date of birth: 11 December 1961 (age 64)
- Place of birth: Nottingham, England
- Height: 5 ft 11 in (1.80 m)
- Position: Forward

Youth career
- Sheffield United

Senior career*
Years	Team	Apps	(Gls)
1979	Sheffield United	5	(3)
1979–1982	West Bromwich Albion	2	(0)
1982	Notts County	0	(0)
1982–1984	Peterborough United	80	(14)
1984–1987	Northampton Town	150	(58)
1987–1988	Cambridge United	25	(2)
1988–1989	Chester City	22	(2)
1989–1990	Exeter City	32	(4)
1990–1992	Southend United	122	(33)
1992–1993	Luton Town	13	(2)
1993–1994	Brentford	15	(2)
1994–1996	Wigan Athletic	20	(6)
1996–1997	Chelmsford City	34	(1)
- Bury Town
- Soham Town Rangers

International career
1979	England Youth	3	(0)

Managerial career
- 1997–1998: Corby Town
- Warboys Town
- 2001–????: Soham Town Rangers
- 2002–????: Wisbech Town
- 2005–2011: Soham Town Rangers
- 2015–2016: Yaxley
- 2016–2017: Stewarts & Lloyds Corby
- * Club domestic league appearances and goals

Ian Tracey Benjamin (born 11 December 1961) is an English former professional footballer who made nearly 500 appearances in the Football League between 1979 and 1994, playing primarily as a forward.

== Career ==
Benjamin joined Sheffield United as a youngster and then made a move to West Bromwich Albion for £100,000. Whilst a West Bromwich Albion player he played in a benefit match for Len Cantello, that saw a team of white players play against a team of black players.

He struggled in his early days and it was not until he joined Peterborough United that he became a first team regular. He then joined the Cobblers, and after a spell in midfield, he moved up front and won the player of the year award. He fitted in well with Graham Carr's side, but he later lost his place as the manager believed he had better options available for Northampton. Benjamin later joined a number of clubs. He helped Southend United to promotion and scored against Bury, but was with Luton Town when they were relegated. In 1996 he dropped into non-League, signing for Chelmsford City and later Bury Town.

His first managerial job was at Corby Town in the late 1990s. He then managed Warboys Town, while working part-time for the Royal Mail postal service, before joining Soham Town Rangers as a player, later becoming joint manager in May 2001. In January 2002 Benjamin was appointed manager of Wisbech Town.

He returned to Soham Town Rangers at the start of the 2005–06 season and led the club to their first Eastern Counties League title in 2007–08, earning promotion to the Southern League. He left Soham in 2011, after which he worked as a youth coach for Northampton Town and for Swindon Town as a scout.

In June 2015 he was appointed manager of Yaxley, with Andy Furnell as his assistant. However, on 31 March 2016 Benjamin resigned as Yaxley manager, stating 'I didn't feel all the committee were behind me'. In June 2016 he became manager of Stewarts & Lloyds Corby, where he remained in post until resigning in December 2017.

== Honours ==
Northampton Town

- Football League Fourth Division: 1986–87

Exeter City

- Football League Fourth Division: 1989–90

Individual

- Northampton Town Player of the Season: 1986–87
