= Aidey Thorpe =

English footballer

Personal information
- Full name: Adrian Thorpe
- Date of birth: 25 November 1963 (age 62)
- Place of birth: Chesterfield, England
- Height: 5 ft 6 in (1.68 m)
- Positions: Winger; forward

Senior career*
Years	Team	Apps	(Gls)
1982–1983	Mansfield Town	2	(1)
1983–1985	Heanor Town		
1985–1987	Bradford City	17	(1)
1986–1987	→ Tranmere Rovers (loan)	5	(3)
1987–1989	Notts County	59	(9)
1989–1990	Walsall	27	(1)
1990–1992	Northampton Town	52	(6)
1992–1993	Instant-Dict		
1993–????	Arnold Town		
- * Club domestic league appearances and goals

Adrian Thorpe (born 25 November 1963), also known as Aidey Thorpe, is an English former footballer who made more than 150 Football League appearances playing as a winger or a forward.

== Career ==
Born in Chesterfield in 1963, Thorpe started his career with Mansfield Town. He moved to non-league Heanor Town, before he returned to the Football League in July 1985 with Bradford City following their promotion to Division Two. He played 17 league games, scoring just once, and also had a loan spell with Tranmere Rovers, before he moved to Notts County in November 1987 for £50,000. He went on to play with Walsall and Northampton Town before he moved to Hong Kong with Instant-Dict.
