= Irvin Gernon =

English footballer

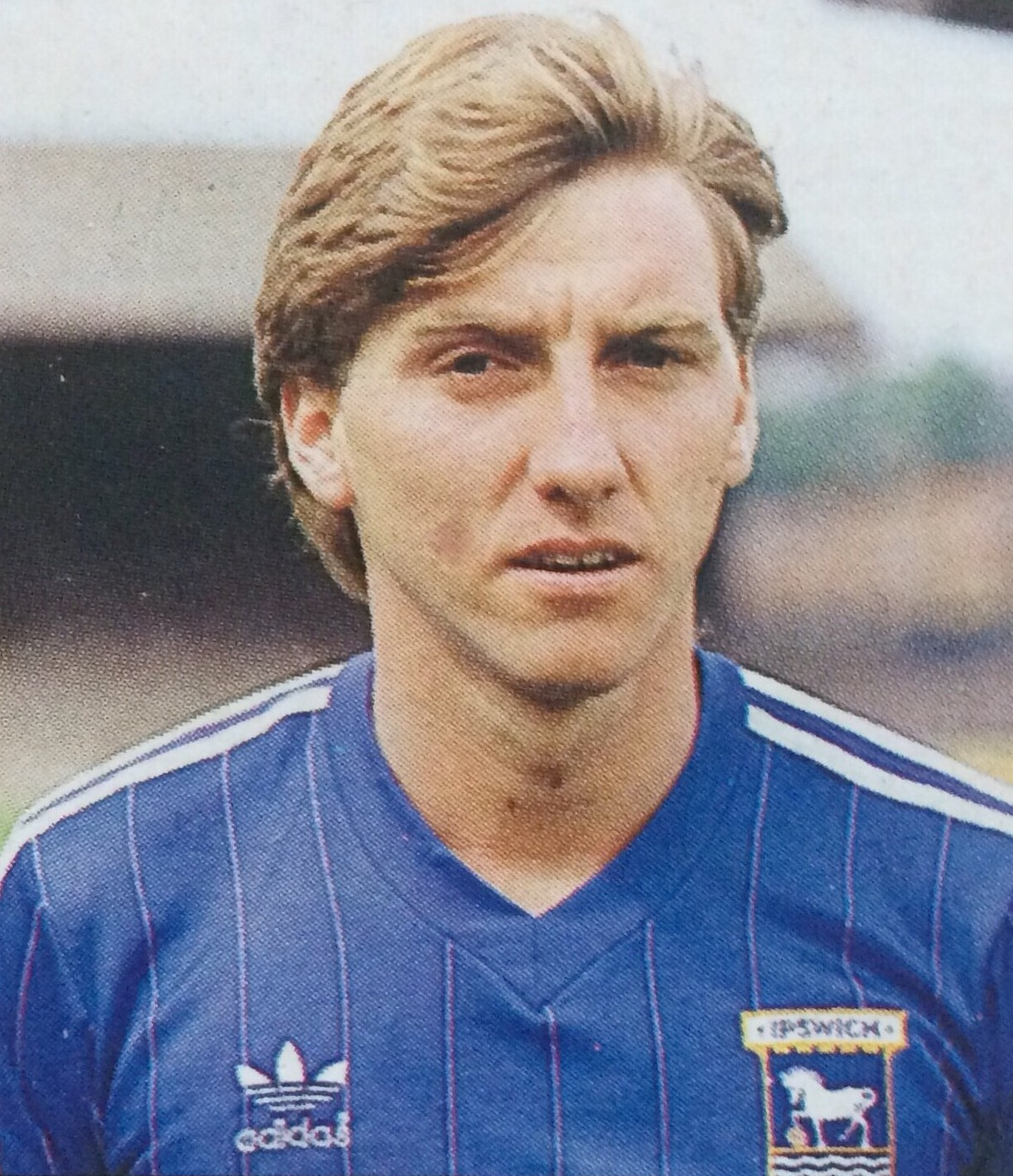

Personal information
- Full name: Frederick Anthony John Gernon
- Date of birth: 30 December 1962 (age 63)
- Place of birth: Birmingham, England
- Height: 6 ft 2 in (1.88 m)
- Position: Defender

Senior career*
Years	Team	Apps	(Gls)
1981–1987	Ipswich Town	76	(0)
1986–1987	→ Northampton Town (loan)	9	(0)
1987–1988	Gillingham	35	(1)
1988–1990	Reading	25	(0)
1990–1992	Northampton Town	48	(1)
1992–1994	Kettering Town		
1994–1995	Telford United	17	(0)

International career
1978	England Schoolboys	5	(0)
1980	England Youth	4	(0)
1983	England U21	1	(0)
- * Club domestic league appearances and goals

Frederick Anthony John Gernon (born 30 December 1962), commonly known as Irvin Gernon, is an English former football defender who played in the Football League for Ipswich Town, Gillingham, Reading and Northampton Town. He represented England at schoolboy, youth and under-21 levels.
