= Ray Lewis (referee) =

English football referee

Ray Lewis (born 30 March 1944) is a former referee in the Football League, Premier League and at FIFA level. He is currently the Chairman of the FA League Committee.

== Career ==
Lewis became a Football League linesman in 1969 at the age of twenty-five. At this point he was based in Bournemouth but he later moved to Great Bookham in Surrey where he served the rest of his career. In 1974, he joined the Supplementary List of referees and one year later progressed to the full referees List.

Over the next few years he established himself and took charge of frequent top division games. In 1983, he was appointed to the League Cup semi-final first leg between Liverpool and Burnley with the Merseysiders (eventual Cup winners) winning 3–0.

He became more prominent in the late 1980s. In April 1987 he refereed the FA Cup semi-final between Tottenham and Watford and a few months later the Charity Shield between Everton and Coventry. On New Year's Day 1989 he was elevated to the FIFA List and marked the day with a match at Old Trafford as Manchester United beat Liverpool 3–1. He took thirteen and a half seasons on the full List to reach this level, the longest period in modern times.

Three months later he refereed Liverpool again in the FA Cup semi-final against Nottingham Forest at Hillsborough. However this proved to be a tragic day as ninety-seven Liverpool supporters were killed in crushes on the terraces. The match was abandoned and replayed three weeks later. Lewis has now stated that wording in his police statement, in relation to Hillsborough, was altered, with certain words changed. Lewis felt that this was "to give support possibly to police actions". Lewis handled the replayed game as well, with Liverpool winning 3–1.

In April 1991 he was awarded another FA Cup semi-final between Tottenham and Arsenal. For the first time a semi-final was played at Wembley. Tottenham emerged surprise 3–1 winners over the eventual League champions in a game which saw a goal from a long-range free-kick by Paul Gascoigne. Only a week later he was back at Wembley for the League Cup Final between Manchester United and Sheffield Wednesday. The Yorkshire team were in the old Division 2 but caused an upset with a 1–0 victory.

At the end of 1991 his international career ended as FIFA brought in its new lower retirement age of forty-five. He reached the domestic retirement age a few months later but achieved an extension and was included in the first set of Premier League referees for 1992–1993.

He served one year on the Premier League before retiring at the age of forty-nine. His career on the Football League had lasted twenty four years (1969–1993) as linesman and referee, the longest period in modern times. More recently he was appointed Chairman of the FA Referees Committee.
