= Trevor Slack =

English footballer

Personal information
- Full name: Trevor Colin Slack
- Date of birth: 26 September 1962 (age 64)
- Place of birth: Peterborough, England
- Height: 6 ft 1 in (1.85 m)
- Position: Central defender

Senior career*
Years	Team	Apps	(Gls)
1980–1986	Peterborough United	202	(18)
1986–1987	Rotherham United	15	(1)
1987–1988	Grimsby Town	21	(0)
1988	Northampton Town	13	(1)
1988–1989	Chesterfield	23	(0)
1988–1989	→ Barnet (loan)	2	(0)
1989–1992	Kettering Town	114	(8)
1992–1993	Boston United	10	(0)
1993–1994	Corby Town		
1994	King's Lynn		
1994	Holbeach United		
1994–1995	Sudbury Town		
1995	Corby Town		
Total		400	(28)
- * Club domestic league appearances and goals

Trevor Colin Slack (born 26 September 1962) is an English former professional footballer who made 274 appearances in the Football League playing as a central defender for Peterborough United, Rotherham United, Grimsby Town, Northampton Town and Chesterfield.
