= Trevor Quow =

English footballer

Personal information
- Full name: Trevor Quow
- Date of birth: 28 September 1960 (age 66)
- Place of birth: Peterborough, England
- Height: 5 ft 7 in (1.70 m)
- Position: Midfielder

Youth career
- Peterborough United

Senior career*
Years	Team	Apps	(Gls)
1978–1986	Peterborough United	203	(17)
1986–1989	Gillingham	79	(3)
1989–1990	Northampton Town	48	(2)
1990–1991	Kettering Town	17	(0)
1991–1992	Northampton Town	40	(0)
1992–1993	Instant Dict		
1993–1995	Hong Kong Rangers		(3)
1995–1996	Sudbury Town		
1996–1997	Stamford		
1998–2001	Boston United	2	(0)
- * Club domestic league appearances and goals

Trevor Quow (born 28 September 1960) is an English former professional footballer who played as a midfielder. He played in the Football League for Gillingham, Peterborough United and Northampton Town, and in the Conference for Kettering Town. He also played non-league football for Sudbury Town, Stamford and Boston United, and for several clubs in Hong Kong.
