= Darren Collins (English footballer) =

English footballer (born 1967)

Personal information
- Date of birth: 24 May 1967 (age 59)
- Place of birth: Winchester, England
- Position: Striker

Senior career*
Years	Team	Apps	(Gls)
198?–1989	Petersfield United	12	(0)
1989–1991	Northampton Town	51	(9)
1991–1992	Aylesbury United	52	(25)
1992–1994	Enfield	88	(45)
1994–2000	Rushden & Diamonds	211	(112)
2000–2002	Kettering Town	47	(14)
2002	Cambridge City	16	(4)
2002–2003	Tamworth	6	(0)
2003	Grantham Town	16	(7)
2003–2005	Nuneaton Borough	100	(98)
2005–2006	Cogenhoe United	85	(31)
2006–2007	Wellingborough Town	46	(50)
2010–2013	Brackley Town	1	(1)
Total		806	(437)

Managerial career
- 2010–: Brackley Town (assistant manager)
- * Club domestic league appearances and goals

Darren Collins (born 24 May 1967) is an English former professional footballer who played as a striker. He is now assistant manager of non-league club Brackley Town.

He started his career with Petersfield Town before signing for Northampton Town in January 1989. He made 40 appearances, plus another 9 as substitute, scoring 9 goals. During the 1990–91 season he moved to Aylesbury United, then Enfield before signing for Rushden & Diamonds in 1994. In six years at Nene Park he became the club's record goalscorer with 153 goals. He joined Kettering in November 2000 for a £25,000 fee (equalling the club's record) and skippered them to the Southern League title. He joined Cambridge City in June 2002, transferred to Tamworth in December 2002 and, after helping them to promotion to the Conference, switched to Grantham Town in August 2003. He played briefly for Nuneaton Borough, had two years at Cogenhoe United before finishing his career at Wellingborough Town. Even in his 40th year Collins was still a prolific goalscorer, before finally retiring in May 2007.
