= David Logan (footballer) =

English footballer

Personal information
- Full name: David Logan
- Date of birth: 5 December 1963 (age 62)
- Place of birth: Middlesbrough, England
- Height: 5 ft 9 in (1.75 m)
- Position: Defender

Senior career*
Years	Team	Apps	(Gls)
1983–1984	Whitby Town		
1984–1987	Mansfield Town	67	(1)
1987–1988	Northampton Town	41	(1)
1988–1989	Halifax Town	3	(0)
1989–1990	Stockport County	60	(4)
1990–1992	Scarborough	55	(1)
1992–1993	Bishop Auckland		
1993–1996	Billingham Synthonia	34	(6)
1996–1999	Whitby Town		
1999–2001	Northallerton Town		
2001	Whitby Town		
Total		226	(7)
- * Club domestic league appearances and goals

David Logan (born 5 December 1963) is an English former professional footballer who played in the Football League for Halifax Town, Mansfield Town, Northampton Town, Scarborough and Stockport County, as a defender. He is celebrated at Whitby Town, he played over 350 games and scored 62 goals. He scored in the 1997 FA Vase final at Wembley Stadium. Logan managed Whitby Town from 2004 to 2006.

== Honours ==
Northampton Town

- Football League Fourth Division: 1986–87
