= Graham Reed (footballer, born 1961) =

English footballer

Personal information
- Date of birth: 24 June 1961 (age 65)
- Place of birth: Doncaster, England
- Height: 5 ft 10 1/2 in (1.79 m)
- Position: Forward

Senior career*
| Years | Team | Apps | (Gls) |
| 1978–1980 | Barnsley | 3 | (0) |
| 1980–1985 | Frickley Athletic | 183 | (50) |
| 1985–1989 | Northampton Town | 112 | (2) |
| 1989–1991 | Aylesbury United | 54 | (4) |
| 1991–1992 | VS Rugby | 40 | (5) |
| 1992–1995 | Kettering Town | 65 | (2) |
| 1995–1996 | Rushden & Diamonds | 4 | (0) |
| 1996 | VS Rugby | 1 | (0) |
- * Club domestic league appearances and goals

Graham Reed (born 24 July 1961 in Doncaster) is an English former professional footballer who played in the Football League, as a forward.

== Honours ==
Northampton Town

- Football League Fourth Division: 1986–87
