= Aidy Mann =

English footballer and coach

Personal information
- Full name: Adrian Gary Mann
- Date of birth: 12 July 1967 (age 59)
- Place of birth: Northampton, England
- Position: Midfielder

Senior career*
Years	Team	Apps	(Gls)
1985–1987	Northampton Town	82	(5)
1987	→ Torquay United (loan)	8	(0)
1987–1988	Newport County	17	(1)
Total		107	(6)
- * Club domestic league appearances and goals

Adrian Gary Mann (born 12 July 1967) is an English football coach and former player. He has played for Northampton Town among other league and non-league clubs. He played as an attacking midfielder and had a decent scoring record.

== Career ==
Mann started his career at Northampton Town and became the club's youngest ever player at the age of 16 years and 297 in May 1984. He made over 100 appearances before spells at Torquay United, Barnet and Newport County. He joined Rushden & Diamonds at the start of their inaugural season in July 1992 and played in their first ever game against Bilston Town. He scored 44 goals in 130 games before playing for a range of Northamptonshire teams.

=== Manager ===
After his playing career Mann was appointed manager of Higham Town in February 1997. After winning the Division One title in his first season, he moved on to Woodford United in 1999 and then to Cogenhoe United for the 2002–03 season. In July 2003 he returned to Higham Town, before becoming player-manager at Long Buckby in February 2004.

After leaving Long Buckby in January 2007, he returned to Higham Town as a player, before moving on to play for Newport Pagnell Town. After a spell as assistant manager at Raunds Town, he became manager of Rushden & Higham United (which Higham Town had merged into) in November 2009.
