= Dave Gilbert (footballer) =

English footballer (born 1963)

Personal information
- Full name: David James Gilbert
- Date of birth: 22 June 1963 (age 63)
- Place of birth: Lincoln, England
- Position: Midfielder

Team information
- Current team: Lincoln United (assistant manager)

Senior career*
| Years | Team | Apps | (Gls) |
| 1981–1982 | Lincoln City | 30 | (1) |
| 1982 | Scunthorpe United | 1 | (0) |
| 1982–1986 | Boston United | 135 | (27) |
| 1986–1989 | Northampton Town | 120 | (21) |
| 1989–1995 | Grimsby Town | 259 | (41) |
| 1995–1998 | West Bromwich Albion | 62 | (6) |
| 1997 | → York City (loan) | 9 | (1) |
| 1997 | → Grimsby Town (loan) | 5 | (0) |
| 1998–1999 | Grantham Town | 44 | (7) |
| 1999–2001 | Spalding United | 34 | (2) |
| 2001–2003 | Grantham Town | 59 | (5) |
| 2003–2007 | Lincoln United | 32 | (4) |
| 2007–2009 | Grantham Town | 121 | (43) |
| Total | | 911 | (158) |
- * Club domestic league appearances and goals

David James Gilbert (born 22 June 1963) is an English former professional footballer who played as a midfielder from 1981 until 2009. He is employed as assistant manager at Lincoln United.

As a player, Gilbert notably played for Grimsby Town and West Bromwich Albion. He also played in the Football League for Lincoln City, Scunthorpe United, Northampton Town and York City, as well as playing Non-League football for Boston United, Grantham Town, Spalding United and Lincoln United.

== Playing career ==
Dave Gilbert began his career at his hometown club Lincoln City, where he made his first-team debut in the 1980–81 season. After two seasons at Sincil Bank, and a brief spell at Scunthorpe United, Gilbert dropped down to the Football Conference and joined Boston United. In 1986, Gilbert got a second chance in the professional game, when he was signed by Northampton Town, and became a key member of the Cobblers side that walked away with the Division Four title in 1986–87, and came close to a second promotion the following season. Midway through the 1988–89 season, as the once-successful Northampton team was broken up, Gilbert was sold to Grimsby Town. It was at this club he arguably had the best years of his career.

Gilbert spent seven seasons at Blundell Park, playing on the left wing. During his tenure, the Mariners were promoted twice and against all odds established themselves at the second-highest level of English football. In 1995, following Grimsby manager Alan Buckley's appointment at West Bromwich Albion a year earlier, Gilbert transferred to The Hawthorns.

Gilbert was a regular at WBA until Buckley was sacked in early 1997. He then found himself in the reserves, and had loan spells at York City and Grimsby, before being released when his contract expired in 1998. He then dropped out of league football and joined non-league side Grantham Town. He spent one-and-a-half season at Grantham, then moved to Spalding United where he spent another year-and-a-half, and then returned to Grantham.

In 2003, Gilbert joined his other hometown side, Lincoln United of the Northern Premier League and remained until the summer of 2007 when he followed the Lincoln United manager John Wilkinson in rejoining Grantham Town. At the beginning of October 2008, following a run of poor form, Wilkinson was asked to step down as the Gingerbreads manager and Gilbert left the club in his wake; Gilbert's final appearance for the club having been in the 5–0 Northern Premier League Division One South home defeat to Glapwell on 27 September 2008.

== Coaching career ==
In November 2009, John Wilkinson returned to management at the helm of Lincoln United and immediately appointed Gilbert as his assistant.

== Personal life ==
In December 2008, Gilbert pleaded guilty to assault by beating after an incident which took place while out celebrating a win with Grantham Town. He was fined £560 plus costs.

== Honours ==
Northampton Town

- Football League Fourth Division: 1986–87
