= Phil Chard =

English footballer and manager

Personal information
- Full name: Philip John Chard
- Date of birth: 16 October 1960 (age 66)
- Place of birth: Corby, England
- Height: 5 ft 8 in (1.73 m)
- Position: Central midfielder

Youth career
- Corby Town

Senior career*
Years	Team	Apps	(Gls)
1978–1985	Peterborough United	172	(18)
1985–1988	Northampton Town	115	(27)
1988–1989	Wolverhampton Wanderers	34	(5)
1989–1994	Northampton Town	163	(19)

Managerial career
- 1992–1993: Northampton Town (player-manager)
- * Club domestic league appearances and goals

Philip John Chard (born 16 October 1960) is an English former footballer who made nearly 500 appearances in the Football League between 1978 and 1994, which included nearly 300 for Northampton Town, a club of which he was player-manager in the early 1990s.

== Honours ==
Northampton Town

- Football League Fourth Division: 1986–87

Wolverhampton Wanderers

- Football League Third Division: 1988–89
