= Paul Culpin =

English footballer

Personal information
- Date of birth: 8 February 1962 (age 64)
- Place of birth: Kirby Muxloe, England
- Height: 5 ft 9 in (1.75 m)
- Position: Striker

Youth career
- 1981–1982: Leicester City

Senior career*
Years	Team	Apps	(Gls)
1982	GrIFK	15	(8)
1982–1985	Nuneaton Borough	150	(131)
1983–1984	→ GrIFK (loan)	30	(19)
1985–1987	Coventry City	9	(2)
1987–1989	Northampton Town	63	(23)
1989–1992	Peterborough United	47	(14)
1990–1991	Barnet (loan)	5	(3)
1992	Hereford United	2	(0)
1992–1996	Nuneaton Borough	102	(72)
- Kirby Muxloe

International career
1985	England C	4	(4)
- * Club domestic league appearances and goals

Paul Culpin (born 8 February 1962 in Kirby Muxloe, Leicestershire) is an English former footballer who played as a striker for Nuneaton Borough, Coventry City, Northampton Town, Peterborough United and Hereford United. He also played abroad, representing Grankulla IFK over three different spells in the Finnish First Division.
