= David Longhurst =

English footballer (1965–1990)

Personal information
- Full name: David John Longhurst
- Date of birth: 15 January 1965
- Place of birth: Northampton, England
- Date of death: 8 September 1990 (aged 25)
- Place of death: York, England
- Height: 5 ft 8 in (1.73 m)
- Position: Striker

Senior career*
Years	Team	Apps	(Gls)
1983–1985	Nottingham Forest	0	(0)
1985–1987	Halifax Town	85	(24)
1987–1988	Northampton Town	37	(7)
1988–1990	Peterborough United	58	(7)
1990	York City	6	(2)
Total		186	(40)
- * Club domestic league appearances and goals

David John Longhurst (15 January 1965 – 8 September 1990) was an English footballer. During his career, he played for Nottingham Forest, Halifax Town, Northampton Town, Peterborough United and York City. He died on the pitch during a match for York City against Lincoln City in 1990.

== Career ==
Northampton-born Longhurst was a pacy striker who began his career in Nottingham Forest's youth team under the management of Brian Clough in the early 1980s, and received a permanent contract in 1983. However, he never played a first team game for Forest, and joined Halifax Town in the Fourth Division on a free transfer in 1985. He was a regular goalscorer at the club, scoring 24 goals in 85 league appearances, although it wasn't enough to turn the West Yorkshire club into promotion contenders. After two seasons at Halifax, he joined his hometown club Northampton Town in 1987.

After one season at Northampton, Longhurst was signed by Peterborough United in 1988, scoring a hat-trick in a 3–3 draw with Gillingham in the FA Cup first round at Priestfield Stadium on 19 November that year. Peterborough won the replay 1–0.

He joined York City in March 1990. In the third match of the 1990–91 season against Lincoln City, Longhurst suffered a heart attack on the pitch, and was pronounced dead when he arrived at the hospital. He was the first player to die in a Football League match in 63 years; the previous on-pitch death in a Football League match was Bury defender Sam Wynne in 1927. The subsequent inquest into Longhurst's death revealed that he suffered from a rare heart condition.

York City later named one of the refurbished stands at the Bootham Crescent stadium after him.
