= Martin Singleton =

English footballer

Personal information
- Full name: Martin David Singleton
- Date of birth: 2 August 1963 (age 63)
- Place of birth: Banbury, England
- Height: 5 ft 8 in (1.73 m)
- Position: Midfielder

Youth career
- Banbury United
- Coventry City

Senior career*
Years	Team	Apps	(Gls)
1981–1984	Coventry City	23	(1)
1984–1986	Bradford City	71	(3)
1986–1987	West Bromwich Albion	19	(1)
1987–1990	Northampton Town	50	(4)
1990–1991	Walsall	28	(1)
- Worcester City
1991	Aylesbury United	3	(0)
Total		194	(10)

International career
1981–1982	England Youth	6	(2)
- * Club domestic league appearances and goals

Martin David Singleton (born 2 August 1963) is an English former professional footballer who played as a midfielder.

== Career ==
Born in Banbury, Singleton played for Banbury United, Coventry City, Bradford City, West Bromwich Albion, Northampton Town, Walsall, Worcester City and Aylesbury United.

He also played for England Youth.

== Honours ==
Bradford City

- Football League Third Division: 1984–85
