= Paul Wilson (footballer, born 1968) =

English footballer

Personal information
- Full name: Paul Anthony Wilson
- Date of birth: 2 August 1968 (age 58)
- Place of birth: Bradford, England
- Height: 5 ft 10 in (1.78 m)
- Position: Full back

Youth career
- Huddersfield Town

Senior career*
Years	Team	Apps	(Gls)
1985–1987	Huddersfield Town	15	(0)
1987	Norwich City	0	(0)
1987–1992	Northampton Town	141	(6)
1992–1993	Halifax Town	45	(7)
1993–1994	Burnley	31	(0)
1994–1995	York City	22	(0)
1995–1997	Scunthorpe United	75	(2)
1997	→ Cambridge United (loan)	7	(0)
1997–1998	Cambridge United	32	(5)
1998–1999	Rushden & Diamonds	17	(0)
- * Club domestic league appearances and goals

Paul Anthony Wilson (born 2 August 1968) is an English former professional footballer who played in the Football League as a midfielder for Huddersfield Town, Northampton Town, Halifax Town, Burnley, York City, Scunthorpe United and Cambridge United.
