= Peter Gleasure =

English footballer (born 1960)

Personal information
- Full name: Peter Francis Gleasure
- Date of birth: 8 October 1960 (age 66)
- Place of birth: Luton, England
- Height: 5 ft 11 in (1.80 m)
- Position: Goalkeeper

Youth career
- Millwall

Senior career*
Years	Team	Apps	(Gls)
1978–1983	Millwall	55	(0)
1983–1992	Northampton Town	344	(0)
1991	→ Gillingham (loan)	3	(0)
1992–1994	Hitchin Town	86	(0)
Total		488	(0)
- * Club domestic league appearances and goals

Peter Francis Gleasure (born 8 October 1960) is an English former professional footballer who played as a goalkeeper in the Football League for Millwall, Northampton Town and Gillingham.

He kept a club record 112 clean sheets in 412 matches playing for Northampton Town and, As of 2020, only two players had made more appearances for the club. He won a Fourth Division championship medal in 1986–87 season with Northampton and was voted the club's Player of the Season the following season. He later had loan spells at Fisher Athletic and Gillingham before moving into non-league football with Hitchin Town, for which he made more than 100 appearances. He was awarded a testimonial match against a Tottenham Hotspur XI in 1993.

== Honours ==
Northampton Town

- Football League Fourth Division: 1986–87
