= Warren Donald =

English footballer

Personal information
- Full name: Warren Ramsay Donald
- Date of birth: 7 October 1964 (age 62)
- Place of birth: Hillingdon, England
- Height: 5 ft 7 in (1.70 m)
- Position: Midfielder

Youth career
- 19??–1983: West Ham United

Senior career*
Years	Team	Apps	(Gls)
1983–1984	West Ham United	2	(0)
1984–1990	Northampton Town	188	(13)
1990–1992	Colchester United	79	(1)
1992–1995	Kettering Town	83	(3)
1995–1998	Nuneaton Borough		
1998–	Raunds Town		
–2000	Daventry Town		
2000–2004	Stamford		
- * Club domestic league appearances and goals

Warren Ramsay Donald (born 7 October 1964) is an English footballer who played as a midfielder in the Football League in the 1980s and 1990s.

== Career ==
Born in Hillingdon, he joined West Ham United as an apprentice, making two League appearances for them. His debut came on 26 December 1983 as a substitute against Southampton, whilst his final game was the last match of the 1983-84 season, against Everton.

After an initial loan spell at Northampton Town, he joined the Cobblers on a permanent basis during 1985–86. Donald went on to play 188 League games for them in total, and was a member of the side that won promotion from the Fourth Division in 1986-87. In 1989-90 Northampton were relegated and he joined Colchester United in the close season.

Colchester had just been relegated to the GM Vauxhall Conference, but Donald helped them win promotion in his second season with the U's, missing just one League game as they edged Wycombe Wanderers to promotion. Donald played in 9 of their first 10 Football League games in 1992–93, but then only played one more league match (on 28 November), before his final senior appearance for the club - a Football League Trophy match against his former side Northampton Town on 1 December 1992. Overall, he made 79 league appearances for the club over two and a half seasons.

He subsequently returned to the Conference when he transferred to Kettering Town for the remainder of the 1992–93 season. In 1993-94 he missed only one league match for the Poppies, as they narrowly missed out on promotion to the League, being pipped by Kidderminster Harriers.

His last games for Kettering were in the 1994–95 season when he played 21 league matches. He subsequently played for Nuneaton Borough, Raunds Town, Daventry Town and Stamford Town.

== Honours ==
Northampton Town

- Football League Fourth Division: 1986–87
