= Steve Berry (footballer) =

English footballer (born 1963)

Personal information
- Full name: Stephen Andrew Berry
- Date of birth: 4 April 1963 (age 63)
- Place of birth: Liverpool, England
- Height: 1.80 m (5 ft 11 in)
- Position: Midfielder

Senior career*
Years	Team	Apps	(Gls)
1980–1981	Gosport Borough		
1981–1984	Portsmouth	35	(3)
1984	→ Aldershot (loan)	9	(0)
1984–1985	Sunderland	46	(2)
1985–1987	Newport County	62	(6)
1987	Swindon Town	10	(1)
1987–1988	Aldershot	53	(6)
1988–1991	Northampton Town	129	(7)
1991–1992	Instant Dict	26	(12)
1992–1993	SV Darmstadt 98	8	(0)
1993–1995	Instant-Dict	42	(19)
1995–1996	Stevenage Borough	37	(2)
1996–1998	Kettering Town	89	(3)
1998–1999	Stevenage Borough	27	(0)
1999–2001	Rushden & Diamonds	2	(0)
2003–2005	Bedford Town	24	(0)
2005–2006	Cogenhoe United	9	(0)
Total		608	(61)

Managerial career
- 1996–1998: Kettering Town (player-manager)
- * Club domestic league appearances and goals

Stephen Andrew Berry (born 4 April 1963) is an English former professional footballer who played in the Football League for Portsmouth, Aldershot, Sunderland, Newport County, Swindon Town and Northampton Town, in the German second division for Darmstadt, and in the Hong Kong First Division League for Instant-Dict.

== Career ==
Berry (nicknamed "Chuck") was born in Liverpool, and played for Gosport Borough before beginning his professional career with Portsmouth. He made his League debut at the age of 18, on 29 August 1981 in the starting eleven for the Third Division home draw with Lincoln City. He played 35 games in all competitions and scored three goals in the 1981–82 season, but played rarely after the arrival of Bobby Campbell as manager. He joined Aldershot on loan in March 1984 and moved to First Division Sunderland on a free transfer in July 1984.

Aged 21, he made his Sunderland debut on 25 August 1984 in a 3–1 win at home to Southampton. He made 45 league and cup appearances including the League Cup final at Wembley that season. Sunderland were relegated at the end of the 1984–85 season and he found himself out of favour after the arrival of Lawrie McMenemy as manager. He played just one game early the following season, and was transferred to Newport County for £20,000 in December 1985.

Sometime later, Newport were facing financial problems and Berry was approached by Lou Macari at Swindon Town and subsequently sold for £15,000. He spent six months at Swindon Town, playing three league and all the play-off games as the club gained promotion to the Second Division, then joined Aldershot in October 1987 in part-exchange for Bobby Barnes, a future teammate at Northampton Town. That club paid a £45,000 fee to sign Berry on a three-year contract. He played well over a hundred games for the Northamptonshire club before playing seven games for Darmstadt in the 1992–93 season in the German second division. He then played in Hong Kong for Instant-Dict for three seasons.

Returning to England, he joined Stevenage Borough, whom he captained to the Conference National title in 1995–96. He moved to Kettering Town, where he scored six goals from 89 appearances in all competitions, was club captain and then player-manager, following the dismissal of Gary Johnson. Steve guided Kettering to respectable mid table positions for two seasons on severely restricted budgets. Following the decision by the Board to once again reduce the playing budget, Berry announced his resignation before rejoining Stevenage as a player for the following season. He spent time working for Brian Talbot at Rushden & Diamonds, as both player and coach, and, coming out of retirement following two operations on his Achilles tendon, at Bedford Town.

In August 2005, at the age of 42, Berry joined Cogenhoe United as a player and helped them in their historic FA Cup run, in which they narrowly failed to reach the fourth qualifying round.

In 2006, having already started a new career in corporate head-hunting and executive coaching, Berry moved to Paris and was Global Director of Talent for Ipsos Mori, a leading market research agency headquartered in Paris. Following this role Steve decided to set up his own Executive Search business in partnership with some ex colleagues. Tillerman Executive Search, based in the 16e Paris. Nowadays, Steve is focused on coaching the development of Talent for Liqueo, a global Management Consultancy. He also supports ex sports people transition their lives and careers after retiring from professional sport.

== Honours ==
Sunderland

- Football League Cup runner-up: 1984–85

Swindon Town

- Football League Third Division play-offs: 1987

== Bibliography ==
- Neasom, Mike; Cooper, Mick; Robinson, Doug (1984). Pompey: The History of Portsmouth Football Club. Milestone Publications. ISBN 0-903852-50-0.
