= Glen Donegal =

English footballer

Personal information
- Date of birth: 20 June 1969 (age 57)
- Place of birth: Northampton, England
- Position: Forward

Senior career*
Years	Team	Apps	(Gls)
1987–1989	Northampton Town	20	(3)
1989–1991	Aylesbury United		
1991–1992	Maidstone United	14	(1)
–	Rushden & Diamonds		
- * Club domestic league appearances and goals

Glen Donegal (born 20 June 1969 in Northampton, England) is a former professional footballer who played in The Football League for Maidstone United and Northampton Town.
