= Keith McPherson =

English footballer

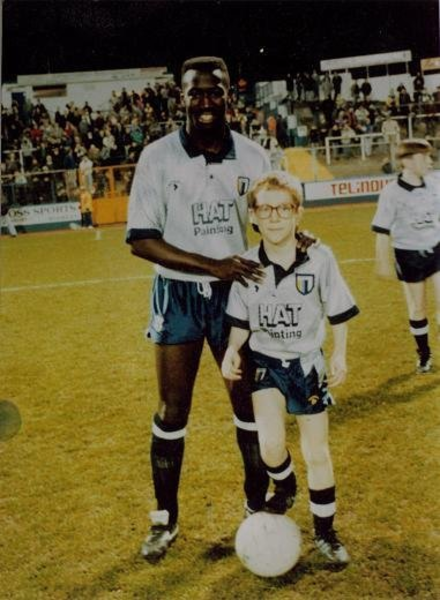
- McPherson during playing days, on left

Personal information
- Full name: Keith Anthony McPherson
- Date of birth: 11 September 1963 (age 63)
- Place of birth: Greenwich, England
- Height: 5 ft 11 in (1.80 m)
- Position: Central defender

Youth career
- 1980–1985: West Ham United

Senior career*
Years	Team	Apps	(Gls)
1985–1986	West Ham United	1	(0)
1985	→ Cambridge United (loan)	11	(1)
1986–1990	Northampton Town	182	(8)
1990–1999	Reading	271	(8)
1999–2000	Brighton & Hove Albion	35	(1)

Managerial career
- 2000: Slough Town
- * Club domestic league appearances and goals

Keith Anthony McPherson (born 11 September 1963) is an English former footballer who played in the Football League as a central defender for West Ham United, Cambridge United, Northampton Town, Reading and Brighton & Hove Albion.

== Career ==
Born in Greenwich to Jamaican parents, McPherson was a product of the West Ham United youth team which he joined in 1980 as an apprentice. He was a member of the 1981 Youth Cup winning team which defeated Tottenham Hotspur in the final. He made just one appearance for West Ham, on 20 May 1985, the last game of the 1984-85 season, in a 3-0 home defeat by Liverpool. He was signed for Northampton Town from West Ham for £10,000 in January 1986. He made 216 appearances for the Cobblers before leaving in August 1990, to join First Division side Reading where he played for nine years. He ended his career at Brighton & Hove Albion and was player with Slough Town before returning to Reading as a coach.

== Honours ==
Northampton Town

- Football League Fourth Division: 1986–87

Reading

- Football League Second Division: 1993–94

Individual

- PFA Team of the Year: 1986–87 Fourth Division
