= 1992–93 Peterborough United F.C. season =

Peterborough United
1992–93 season
- Chairman: John Devaney (until January); Chris Turner (from January)
- Manager: Chris Turner (until 1 December); Lil Fuccillo (from 1 December)
- Stadium: London Road Stadium
- First Division: 10th
- FA Cup: Second round
- League Cup: Second round
- Top goalscorer: Adcock (19)
Home colours

During the 1992–93 English football season, Peterborough United F.C. competed in the Football League First Division.

== Final league table ==
Pos	Team	Pld	W	D	L	GF	GA	GD	Pts
8	Derby County	46	19	9	18	68	57	+11	66
9	Grimsby Town	46	19	7	20	58	57	+1	64
10	Peterborough United	46	16	14	16	55	63	−8	62
11	Wolverhampton Wanderers	46	16	13	17	57	56	+1	61
12	Charlton Athletic	46	16	13	17	49	46	+3	61

Source: rsssf.com
Rules for classification: 1) Points; 2) Goals scored; 3) Goal difference

== Results ==
Peterborough United's score comes first

=== Legend ===
Win	Draw	Loss

=== Football League First Division ===
Date	Opponent	Venue	Result	Attendance	Scorers
15 August 1992	Derby County	H	1–0	9,955	Charlery
22 August 1992	Southend United	A	1–0	4,651	Adcock
29 August 1992	Notts County	H	1–3	6,670	Barnes
5 September 1992	Wolverhampton Wanderers	A	3–4	14,532	Halsall, Charlery, Sterling
12 September 1992	West Ham United	H	1–3	10,657	Adcock
15 September 1992	Millwall	H	0–0	5,619	
19 September 1992	Barnsley	A	2–1	5,275	Adcock, Sterling
26 September 1992	Newcastle United	H	0–1	14,487	
3 October 1992	Grimsby Town	A	3–1	5,208	Adcock, Charlery, Sterling
10 October 1992	Brentford	H	0–0	5,818	
18 October 1992	Leicester City	A	2–0	10,952	Philliskirk, Sterling
24 October 1992	Luton Town	H	2–3	7,125	Cooper, Adcock
30 October 1992	Tranmere Rovers	A	1–1	8,068	Ebdon
3 November 1992	Watford	A	2–1	7,016	Philliskirk (2)
7 November 1992	Sunderland	H	5–2	8,193	Adcock (2), Philliskirk, Cooper, Iorfa
21 November 1992	Bristol Rovers	H	1–1	6,208	Adcock
29 November 1992	Swindon Town	H	3–3	5,976	Adcock (2), Taylor (own goal)
12 December 1992	Portsmouth	H	1–1	6,516	Philliskirk
19 December 1992	Bristol City	A	1–0	7,309	Welsh
28 December 1992	Charlton Athletic	H	1–1	8,931	Philliskirk
9 January 1993	Barnsley	H	1–1	6,008	Cooper (pen)
16 January 1993	Newcastle United	A	0–3	29,155	
22 January 1993	Birmingham City	A	0–2	10,277	
27 January 1993	Millwall	A	0–4	8,732	
30 January 1993	Southend United	H	1–0	6,180	Philliskirk
6 February 1993	Derby County	A	3–2	16,062	Curtis, Philliskirk, Adcock
9 February 1993	West Ham United	A	1–2	12,537	Ebdon
13 February 1993	Wolverhampton Wanderers	H	2–3	9,195	Halsall, Adcock
21 February 1993	Notts County	A	0–1	7,468	
27 February 1993	Brentford	A	1–0	6,337	Philliskirk
6 March 1993	Grimsby Town	H	1–0	6,657	Adcock
9 March 1993	Birmingham City	H	2–1	7,600	Holmes (own goal), Barnes
13 March 1993	Sunderland	A	0–3	18,372	
16 March 1993	Cambridge United	A	2–2	8,077	Adcock (2)
20 March 1993	Oxford United	H	1–1	6,316	Sterling
24 March 1993	Bristol Rovers	A	1–3	4,855	Sterling
27 March 1993	Watford	H	0–0	7,631	
3 April 1993	Swindon Town	A	0–1	10,340	
6 April 1993	Portsmouth	A	0–4	15,093	
10 April 1993	Cambridge United	H	1–0	10,235	Sterling
12 April 1993	Charlton Athletic	A	1–0	6,721	Sterling
17 April 1993	Bristol City	H	1–1	5,169	Barnes
20 April 1993	Oxford United	A	1–2	4,525	Philliskirk
24 April 1993	Leicester City	H	3–0	15,445	Philliskirk, Adcock, Ebdon
1 May 1993	Luton Town	A	0–0	10,011	
8 May 1993	Tranmere Rovers	H	1–1	8,189	Ebdon

=== FA Cup ===
Round	Date	Opponent	Venue	Result	Attendance	Goalscorers
R1	14 November 1992	Kingstonian	A	1–1	5,000	Adcock
R1R	25 November 1992	Kingstonian	H	9–1 (void)	5,327	Philliskirk (5), Adcock (2), Cooper, Harlow (own goal)
R1 2R	25 November 1992	Kingstonian	H	1–0	?	Sterling
R2	9 December 1992	Plymouth Argyle	A	2–3	6,057	Philliskirk, Sterling

=== League Cup ===
Round	Date	Opponent	Venue	Result	Attendance	Goalscorers
R2 First Leg	23 September 1992	Leicester City	A	0–2	10,366	
R2 Second Leg	6 October 1992	Leicester City	H	2–1 (lost 1–2 on agg)	6,936	Halsall, Charlery

=== Anglo-Italian Cup ===
Round	Date	Opponent	Venue	Result	Attendance	Goalscorers
PR Group 4	1 September 1992	Tranmere Rovers	H	0–0	1,954	
PR Group 4	30 September 1992	Wolverhampton Wanderers	A	0–2	3,091	

== Squad ==
Note: Flags indicate national team as defined under FIFA eligibility rules; some limited exceptions apply. Players may hold more than one non-FIFA nationality.

Pos.	Nation	Player
GK	ENG	Ian Bennett
DF	ENG	Noel Luke
DF	SCO	Steve Welsh
DF	ENG	Darren Bradshaw
DF	ENG	Lee Howarth
DF	ENG	Ronnie Robinson
MF	ENG	Worrell Sterling
MF	ENG	Gary Cooper
MF	WAL	Marcus Ebdon
MF	ENG	Mick Halsall
FW	ENG	Tony Adcock
FW	ENG	Tony Philliskirk
FW	ENG	Bobby Barnes
DF	ENG	Tony Spearing
MF	SCO	John McGlashan
FW	LCA	Ken Charlery

Pos.	Nation	Player
MF	ENG	Andy Curtis
DF	ENG	Chris Greenman
DF	ENG	Dave Tuttle (on loan from Tottenham Hotspur)
DF	ENG	Chris White
FW	NGA	Dominic Iorfa
MF	ENG	David Roche
MF	ENG	Graham Retallick
MF	ENG	Peter Costello
DF	ENG	Nicky Limber
FW	ENG	Godfrey Ingram
FW	ENG	Pat Gavin
FW	WAL	Kurt Nogan
MF	ENG	Tony Sorrell
FW	ENG	Iain Dunn
GK	ENG	Fred Barber
FW	ENG	Dale Watkins
