= 1993–94 Peterborough United F.C. season =

Peterborough United
1993–94 season
- Chairman: Chris Turner
- Manager: Lil Fuccillo (until 29 December); Chris Turner (from 29 December)
- Stadium: London Road Stadium
- First Division: 24th (relegated)
- FA Cup: Third round
- League Cup: Fourth round
- Top goalscorer: League: Adcock (12); All: Adcock (13)
- Average home league attendance: 7,412
Home colours

During the 1993–94 English football season, Peterborough United F.C. competed in the Football League First Division.

== Season summary ==
Peterborough spent most of the season in the relegation zone and on 29 December, which had seen them win only 3 games overall and just 1 win in 15 league games, manager Lil Fuccillo was sacked and chairman Chris Turner became caretaker manager for rest of the season but was unable to save the Posh from relegation.

== Final league table ==
Pos	Team	Pld	W	D	L	GF	GA	GD	Pts	Qualification or relegation
20	Luton Town	46	14	11	21	56	60	−4	53	
21	West Bromwich Albion	46	13	12	21	60	69	−9	51	
22	Birmingham City (R)	46	13	12	21	52	69	−17	51	Relegation to the Second Division
23	Oxford United (R)	46	13	10	23	54	75	−21	49	Relegation to the Second Division
24	Peterborough United (R)	46	8	13	25	48	76	−28	37	Relegation to the Second Division

Source: rsssf.com
Rules for classification: 1) Points; 2) Goals scored; 3) Goal difference
(R) Relegated

== Results ==
Peterborough United's score comes first

=== Legend ===
Win	Draw	Loss

=== Football League First Division ===
Date	Opponent	Venue	Result	Attendance	Scorers
14 August 1993	Leicester City	A	1–2	14,853	Cooper (pen)
17 August 1993	Barnsley	H	4–1	5,875	Iorfa (2), Adcock, Barnes
21 August 1993	Notts County	H	1–1	6,890	Welsh
28 August 1993	Southend United	A	0–3	5,270	
4 September 1993	Grimsby Town	H	1–2	5,962	Cooper
11 September 1993	Derby County	A	0–2	14,779	
18 September 1993	Oxford United	H	3–1	5,148	Philliskirk (3)
25 September 1993	Millwall	H	0–0	6,219	
2 October 1993	Sunderland	A	0–2	17,846	
9 October 1993	Portsmouth	H	2–2	6,538	McGlashan, Adcock
16 October 1993	West Bromwich Albion	A	0–3	15,134	
23 October 1993	Birmingham City	H	1–0	7,575	Philliskirk (pen)
30 October 1993	Middlesbrough	A	1–1	10,704	Iorfa
2 November 1993	Bolton Wanderers	A	1–1	7,058	Rush
6 November 1993	Tranmere Rovers	H	0–0	5,519	
20 November 1993	Charlton Athletic	H	0–1	6,273	
27 November 1993	Bristol City	H	0–2	5,084	
3 December 1993	Tranmere Rovers	A	1–2	6,294	Adcock (pen)
11 December 1993	Barnsley	A	0–1	6,209	
19 December 1993	Leicester City	H	1–1	8,595	Adcock
27 December 1993	Luton Town	H	0–0	9,522	
28 December 1993	Watford	A	1–2	7,155	Adcock
1 January 1994	Wolverhampton Wanderers	H	0–1	10,298	
15 January 1994	West Bromwich Albion	H	2–0	7,757	Charlery, Strodder (own goal)
22 January 1994	Portsmouth	A	2–0	19,534	Adcock (2)
1 February 1994	Crystal Palace	A	2–3	12,426	Charlery (2)
5 February 1994	Birmingham City	A	0–0	15,140	
12 February 1994	Middlesbrough	H	1–0	7,020	Charlery
19 February 1994	Stoke City	H	1–1	7,428	Bradshaw
22 February 1994	Notts County	A	1–2	6,106	Iorfa
2 March 1994	Nottingham Forest	A	0–2	19,329	
5 March 1994	Southend United	H	3–1	5,878	Charlery, Adcock, Spearing
8 March 1994	Grimsby Town	A	2–3	4,504	Adcock, Iorfa
12 March 1994	Oxford United	A	2–1	5,789	McGorry, Iorfa
16 March 1994	Derby County	H	2–2	7,371	Charlery, Iorfa
22 March 1994	Millwall	A	0–1	8,519	
26 March 1994	Sunderland	H	1–3	8,753	Adcock (pen)
29 March 1994	Crystal Palace	H	1–1	8,412	Iorfa
2 April 1994	Luton Town	A	0–2	8,398	
5 April 1994	Watford	H	3–4	7,734	McGlashan, Adcock (2, 1 pen)
9 April 1994	Wolverhampton Wanderers	A	1–1	23,676	McGlashan
13 April 1994	Stoke City	A	0–3	10,181	
16 April 1994	Bolton Wanderers	H	2–3	6,616	Hackett, McGorry
23 April 1994	Charlton Athletic	A	1–5	8,826	Charlery
30 April 1994	Nottingham Forest	H	2–3	14,010	McGorry, Charlery
7 May 1994	Bristol City	A	1–4	7,790	Furnell

=== FA Cup ===
Round	Date	Opponent	Venue	Result	Attendance	Goalscorers
R3	8 January 1994	Tottenham Hotspur	A	1–1	19,169	Brissett
R3R	19 January 1994	Tottenham Hotspur	H	1–1 (lost 4–5 on pens)	24,893	Charlery

=== League Cup ===
Round	Date	Opponent	Venue	Result	Attendance	Goalscorers
R2 1st leg	21 September 1993	Barnsley	A	1–1	4,549	Brissett
R2 2nd leg	5 October 1993	Barnsley	H	3–1 (won 4–2 on agg)	3,533	Philliskirk, McGlashan, Oliver
R3	26 October 1993	Blackpool	A	2–2	4,863	Hackett, Adcock
R3R	9 November 1993	Blackpool	H	2–1	4,419	Rush, Bradshaw
R4	30 November 1993	Portsmouth	H	0–0	6,141	
R4R	15 December 1993	Portsmouth	A	0–1	9,634	

=== Anglo-Italian Cup ===
Round	Date	Opponent	Venue	Result	Attendance	Goalscorers
Group 3	31 August 1993	Leicester City	H	4–3	3,830	Iorfa, McGlashan, Cooper (pen), Philliskirk
Group 3	15 September 1993	West Bromwich Albion	A	1–3	4,365	Okorie

== Squad ==
Squad at end of season

Note: Flags indicate national team as defined under FIFA eligibility rules; some limited exceptions apply. Players may hold more than one non-FIFA nationality.

No.	Pos.	Nation	Player
—	GK	(England) ENG	Fred Barber
—	GK	(England) ENG	Ian Bennett
—	GK	(England) ENG	Scott Cooksey
—	GK	(England) ENG	Mark Tyler
—	DF	(England) ENG	Darren Bradshaw
—	DF	(England) ENG	Simon Clark
—	DF	(England) ENG	Chris Greenman
—	DF	(England) ENG	Lee Howarth
—	DF	(England) ENG	Darren Oliver
—	DF	(England) ENG	Tony Spearing
—	DF	(England) ENG	Lee Williams
—	DF	(Wales) WAL	Mark Peters
—	DF	(Scotland) SCO	Craig Boardman
—	DF	(Scotland) SCO	Steve Welsh
—	DF	(Republic of Ireland) IRL	David McDonald
—	DF	(Poland) POL	Zbigniew Kruszyński
—	DF	(Canada) CAN	Ian Carter
—	MF	(England) ENG	Bobby Barnes
—	MF	(England) ENG	Jason Brissett

No.	Pos.	Nation	Player
—	MF	(England) ENG	Gary Cooper
—	MF	(England) ENG	Andy Curtis
—	MF	(England) ENG	Mick Halsall
—	MF	(England) ENG	Brian McGorry
—	MF	(England) ENG	Andy Stanhope
—	MF	(Wales) WAL	Marcus Ebdon
—	MF	(Scotland) SCO	Steve Fulton
—	MF	(Scotland) SCO	John McGlashan
—	MF	(Republic of Ireland) IRL	Paul McGee (on loan from Wimbledon)
—	FW	(England) ENG	Tony Adcock
—	FW	(England) ENG	Steve Anthrobus (on loan from Wimbledon)
—	FW	(England) ENG	Andy Furnell
—	FW	(England) ENG	Terry Gibson
—	FW	(England) ENG	Tony Philliskirk
—	FW	(England) ENG	David Rush (on loan from Sunderland)
—	FW	(Nigeria) NGA	Dominic Iorfa
—	FW	(Nigeria) NGA	Chima Okorie
—	FW	(Saint Lucia) LCA	Ken Charlery
