= 1992 Football League Third Division play-off final =

Association football match

- The final took place at Wembley Stadium.
- Event: 1991–92 Football League Third Division
| Peterborough United | Stockport County |
| 2 | 1 |
- Date: 24 May 1992
- Venue: Wembley Stadium, London
- Referee: Martin Bodenham
- Attendance: 35,087

The 1992 Football League Third Division play-off final was an association football match which was played on 24 May 1992 at Wembley Stadium, London, between Peterborough United and Stockport County to determine the third and final team to gain promotion from the Football League Third Division to the Second Division. The top two teams of the 1991–92 Football League Third Division, Brentford and Birmingham City, gained automatic promotion, while the teams placed from third to sixth place took part in play-off semi-finals; the winners of these semi-finals competed for the final place in the Second Division for the 1992–93 season. Peterborough and Stockport beat Huddersfield Town and Stoke City, respectively, in the semi-finals.

The match was refereed by Martin Bodenham in front of 35,087 spectators. The first half ended goalless but in the 52nd minute, a corner from Bobby Barnes found Ken Charlery at the near post who beat two defenders to head the ball onto the frame of the goal from where it bounced down; the linesman ruled it had crossed the line and the goal was awarded, making it 1–0 to Peterborough. Fifteen minutes later, Kevin Francis scored with a header from an Andy Preece pass, but the linesman raised his flag to signify offside and the goal was disallowed. With three minutes of the match remaining, Francis scored when Peterborough goalkeeper Fred Barber failed to catch a 15-yard (14-metre) strike from Preece. Peterborough took the lead back within two minutes, with Charlery scoring his second. A long pass from Marcus Ebdon was headed on by Charlery who ran past Tony Barras and shot past Neil Edwards in the Stockport goal.

Peterborough ended their following season in tenth position in League Division 1 (the renamed Second Division). Stockport finished their next season in sixth place in League Division 2 (the renamed Third Division) and qualified for the 1993 Football League play-offs, where they lost 2–1 on aggregate to Port Vale.

== Route to the final ==
Football League Third Division final table, leading positions
| Pos | Team | Pld | W | D | L | GF | GA | GD | Pts |
|---|---|---|---|---|---|---|---|---|---|
| 1 | Brentford | 46 | 25 | 7 | 14 | 81 | 55 | +26 | 82 |
| 2 | Birmingham City | 46 | 23 | 12 | 11 | 69 | 52 | +17 | 81 |
| 3 | Huddersfield Town | 46 | 22 | 12 | 12 | 59 | 38 | +21 | 78 |
| 4 | Stoke City | 46 | 21 | 14 | 11 | 69 | 49 | +20 | 77 |
| 5 | Stockport County | 46 | 22 | 10 | 14 | 75 | 52 | +23 | 76 |
| 6 | Peterborough United | 46 | 20 | 14 | 12 | 65 | 58 | +7 | 74 |

Stockport County finished the regular 1991–92 season in fifth place in the Football League Third Division, the third tier of the English football league system, one place ahead of Peterborough United. Both therefore missed out on the two automatic places for promotion to the Second Division and instead took part in the play-offs to determine the third promoted team. Stockport County finished five points behind Birmingham City (who were promoted in second place) and six behind league winners Brentford. Peterborough United ended the season two points behind Stockport County.

Stockport's opposition for their play-off semi-final was Stoke City with the first match of the two-legged tie taking place at Edgeley Park in Stockport on 10 May 1992. Cynthia Bateman, writing in The Guardian, suggested "the football was as poor and malevolent as the atmosphere" in a match which saw Stoke's captain Carl Beeston sent off seven minutes before half-time after an altercation with Jim Gannon following an argument over a free kick. Three minutes later, Stockport County took the lead through Peter Ward's curling free kick from 25 yards (23 metres). The home side had several chances but failed to increase their lead; Stoke, according to Bateman, "did hardly anything worthy of favourable comment" and the match ended 1–0. The second leg was held three days later at the Victoria Ground in Stoke-on-Trent. Chris Beaumont opened the scoring for the away side within a minute of the start of the match, with Mark Stein equalising in the 81st minute at 1–1. At the final whistle, Stockport supporters invaded the pitch and were forced back by police with dogs. Stockport progressed to the final with a 2–1 aggregate victory.

Peterborough United faced Huddersfield Town in their semi-final, with the first leg at London Road in Peterborough on 11 May 1992. Iffy Onuora put the visitors ahead in the 28th minute from close range after Peterborough goalkeeper Fred Barber had made a double-save. Ken Charlery equalised 15 seconds after half-time and midway through the second half, Huddersfield again took the lead as David Robinson an own goal after deflecting a Phil Starbuck cross past Barber. In the final minute, Mick Halsall scored the equaliser with a shot from around 18 yards (16 metres) which went in off the underside of the crossbar; the match ended 2–2. The second semi-final leg was played at Leeds Road in Huddersfield three days later. Starbuck scored with a volley from a Ronnie Robinson cross to give the home side the lead in the second minute before Worrell Sterling equalised mid-way through the second half. After coming on as substitute, Steve Cooper scored a late winner for Peterborough after he dived to head in a cross from Bobby Barnes, to see them win 2–1 and progress to the final 4–3 on aggregate. The match was marred by a late pitch invasion coupled with violence outside the stadium, during which around 30 Huddersfield fans were arrested.

== Match ==
=== Background ===
Stockport County had featured in the play-offs once before, a 6–0 aggregate loss to Chesterfield in the 1990 play-off semi-finals. Stockport were seeking to be promoted to the Second Division, where they last participated in the 1937–38 season, and had been promoted to the Third Division the previous season as runners-up on goal difference to champions Darlington. Peterborough had never participated in the play-offs and had also been promoted to the Third Division the season before. They were aiming to play in the second tier of English football for the first time since joining the English Football League in 1960. During the regular season, Peterborough won both matches between the sides with a 3–0 victory at Edgeley Park in December 1991 and a 3–2 win at London Road the following February. Stockport had most recently played at Wembley Stadium eight days before the play-off final when they played semi-final opponents Stoke City in the Associate Members' Cup Final, losing 1–0. Peterborough were making their first appearance at the national stadium.

The referee for the match was Martin Bodenham. Before the match, Halsall spoke confidently of Peterborough's chances, saying that "Wembley will suit our style ... We can run all day and hopefully run Stockport into the ground ... But they won't want to lose at Wembley twice running". Stockport's Gannon suggested the experience would stand them in good stead: "We had a chance to take in the atmosphere last week. Now it's time to play some football. We learned plenty in our first visit; it's up to us to put that into practice". Before the kick off, the Parachute Regiment's Red Devils demonstration team landed in the centre circle.

As a result of the foundation of the Premier League for the beginning of the 1992–93 football season, the lower three tiers of English football were re-branded accordingly: the Second Division became the Third Division, the Third Division was renamed the Second Division and the Fourth Division retitled the Third Division. Consequently, the winners of the final would be promoted from the Third Division to the "new" First Division.

=== Summary ===
The match kicked off around 3 p.m. on 24 May 1992 at Wembley Stadium in front of 35,087 spectators. Five minutes into the game, a cross from Barnes was headed on by Sterling, then controlled by Charlery with his chest; his shot went over the Stockport crossbar. Before half-time, Stockport's 6 ft 7 in (2.01 m)-tall striker Kevin Francis won a number of corners, one of which was headed wide of the Peterborough goal by Tony Barras. The first half ended goalless.

Neither side made any changes to their personnel during the interval. In the 52nd minute, a corner from Barnes found Charlery at the near post. Charlery outjumped two defenders and headed the ball towards the goal, where it ricocheted off the top of the frame and bounced down; the linesman ruled it had crossed the line and the goal was awarded, making it 1–0 to Peterborough. Fifteen minutes later, Francis scored with a header from an Andy Preece pass, but the linesman deemed him offside and disallowed the goal. In the 75th minute, Peterborough made the first substitution of the game with Lee Howarth coming on to replace Steve Welsh, and a minute later, Stockport's Paul Wheeler was brought on in place of Ward. With three minutes of the match remaining, Preece struck the ball from 15 yards (14 metres). The ball went through the hands of Peterborough goalkeeper Fred Barber, and was struck by Francis to level the game. Within two minutes, however, Charlery scored his second to take the lead back for Peterborough. A long pass from Marcus Ebdon was headed on by Charlery, who ran past Barras and shot past Neil Edwards in the Stockport goal. The match ended 2–1 and Peterborough secured promotion to the newly branded League Division 1.

=== Details ===
| 24 May 1992 | Peterborough United | 2–1 | Stockport County | Wembley Stadium, London |
| 15:00 UTC | Charlery 52', 89' | | Francis 87' | Attendance: 35,087; Referee: Martin Bodenham |

| 1 | Fred Barber |
| 2 | Noel Luke |
| 3 | Ronnie Robinson |
| 4 | Mick Halsall (c) |
| 5 | David Robinson |
| 6 | Steve Welsh (substituted off) 75' |
| 7 | Worrell Sterling |
| 8 | Marcus Ebdon |
| 9 | Tony Adcock |
| 10 | Ken Charlery |
| 11 | Bobby Barnes |
Substitutes:
| 12 | Lee Howarth (substituted in) 75' |
Manager:
Chris Turner

| 1 | Neil Edwards |
| 2 | Darren Knowles |
| 3 | Lee Todd |
| 4 | David Frain |
| 5 | Tony Barras |
| 6 | Bill Williams |
| 7 | Jim Gannon |
| 8 | Peter Ward (substituted off) 76' |
| 9 | Kevin Francis |
| 10 | Chris Beaumont |
| 11 | Andy Preece |
Substitutes:
| 12 | Paul Wheeler (substituted in) 76' |
Manager:
Danny Bergara

== Post-match ==
The Peterborough manager Chris Turner described the decision-making surrounding the opening goal as a "Russian linesman job" while his counterpart Danny Bergara called it a "travesty". With regard to Francis' disallowed goal, Bergara suggested the linesman had "seen a ghost ... There is no way [Francis] is offside." Keith Blackmore, writing in The Times, described the match as "one of the most dramatic and controversial matches since the play-off finals moved to Wembley in 1990". Turner said: "It's a lovely thought that next year we will be playing teams like Derby and West Ham. Fifteen or sixteen months ago we were nothing. Now the Premier League is only one division away." Bergara suggested that a review system should be put in place: "I'm not criticising the referee ... he had a difficult job and everyone makes mistakes ... I think it's time we tried television replays."

Peterborough ended their following season in tenth position in League Division 1 (the renamed Second Division). Stockport finished their next season in sixth place in League Division 2 (the renamed Third Division), qualifying for the 1993 Football League play-offs, where they lost 2–1 on aggregate to Port Vale.
