= List of Peterborough United F.C. seasons =

Peterborough United Football Club is an English association football club based in Peterborough, Cambridgeshire. After former Southern League club Peterborough & Fletton United folded in 1932, there had been no senior football in the Peterborough area. In the summer of 1934, a new professional club, named Peterborough United, was founded to take its place. It was welcomed into membership of the Midland League for 1934–35, and the club's first team finished that initial season in mid-table. They entered the national cup competition, the FA Cup, the following season, but lost their opening match 3–0 at home to Rushden Town in the first qualifying round. When competitive football resumed after the Second World War, Peterborough enjoyed improved performances in both league and cup competition. In the cup, they regularly reached the rounds proper, and progressed to the fourth round in 1956–57 and 1959–60, eliminating two Football League teams on the first occasion and three on the second. In the Midland League, they finished second in 1953–54, third the following year, and then embarked on a run of five consecutive championships, scoring more than 100 goals in each campaign. Repeated attempts at election to the Football League failed – albeit narrowly in 1958–59 – until they finally gained admission to the Fourth Division in 1960 at the expense of Gateshead.

Their momentum continued into the new Football League season: in second place with Christmas approaching, Peterborough did not lose again until the following April. They won the Fourth Division title, scoring what remains a Football League record 134 goals. Terry Bly supplied 52 of those 134 – not a league record, but a seasonal total which has not been surpassed since. They followed up with four top-half finishes at the higher level before dropping to mid-table, eliminated Arsenal among others on their way to the sixth round (quarter-final) of the 1964–65 FA Cup, and went one step further in the 1965–66 League Cup, losing to West Bromwich Albion in the semifinal, but problems off the field disrupted their further progress. In November 1967, the Football Association and Football League met to consider charges of making illegal payments to players, poor accounting practices and poor internal governance, stemming from claims surrounding an FA Cup match against Sunderland the previous January. They decided that Peterborough would be demoted to the Fourth Division at the end of the 1967–68 season. At the time, they stood fourth in the Third Division after 19 matches. They won their second Fourth Division championship in 1973–74, this time spending five years in the Third before returning to the fourth tier until 1991.

Back-to-back promotions – via a fourth-place finish in 1990–91 and the play-offs in 1992, beating Stockport County 2–1 in the final, – earned Peterborough a place in the second tier for the first time in the club's history. They came 10th in what was called the First Division – when the newly formed FA Premier League split from the Football League, the remaining divisions of the Football League were renumbered upwards – which remains the team's highest league finish. and were relegated in 1993–94. They returned to the second tier, which by then had been rebranded as the Football League Championship, in 2009, again after two consecutive promotions. Although relegated straight back to League One, they were immediately re-promoted, and stayed up for two seasons. Failure in the 2014 play-offs was offset by a first ever victory in a nationally organised cup competition: Peterborough defeated Chesterfield by three goals to one in the final of the 2013–14 Football League Trophy, a competition open to clubs in the third and fourth tiers of English football. They returned to the Championship as 2020–21 League One runners-up, went straight back down, and lost to Sheffield Wednesday on penalties in the 2023 play-off semifinal. They won the 2023–24 EFL Trophy, beating Wycombe Wanderers in the final, but again lost in the play-offs.

As of the end of the 2023–24 season, the team have spent 25 seasons in the fourth tier of the English football league system, 33 in the third, and 6 in the second. The table details the team's achievements and the top goalscorers in senior first-team competitions from their debut season in the Midland League in 1934–35 to the end of the most recently completed season.

== Key ==
Key to league record:

- P – Played
- W – Games won
- D – Games drawn
- L – Games lost
- F – Goals for
- A – Goals against
- Pts – Points
- Pos – Final position

Key to colours and symbols:

1st or W	Winners
2nd or F	Runners-up
↑	Promoted
↓	Relegated
♦	Top league scorer in Peterborough's division

Key to divisions:

- Mid – Midland League
- Ldn MW – London Midweek League
- Div 3 – Football League Third Division
- Div 4 – Football League Fourth Division
- Champ – Championship
- League 1 – League One
- League 2 – League Two

Key to stages of competitions:

- Group – Group stage
- Prelim – Preliminary round
- QR1 – First qualifying round
- QR2 – Second qualifying round, etc.
- R1 – First round
- R2 – Second round, etc.
- QF – Quarter-final
- SF – Semi-final
- F – Runners-up
- W – Winners
- (S) – Southern section of regionalised stage

Details of the abandoned 1939–40 season are shown in italics and appropriately footnoted.

== Seasons ==
Season	League									FA Cup	League Cup (Note: The League Cup competition started in the 1960–61 season.)	Other		Top scorer(s) (Note: Includes goals scored in all nationally organised competitions, i.e. the Football League, including play-offs, FA Cup, League Cup, Football League Group Cup, EFL Trophy and predecessors, and Anglo-Italian Cup, as well as goals scored in the Midland League and London Midweek League before Peterborough's admission to the Football League. For seasons from 1934–35 to 2009–10, sourced to the Peterborough United Football Club database; from 2010–11 onwards sourced to Soccerbase.)	
Season	Division (Note: From the 1960–61 Football League season onwards, divisions are sorted according to their level within the English football league system, and separately from the pre-Football League division.)	P	W	D	L	F	A	Pts	Pos	FA Cup	League Cup	Competition	Result	Name	Goals
1934–35	Mid	38	15	10	13	81	84	40	10th	—	—	—	—	Bill Rigby; James Thompson	14
1935–36	Mid	40	13	8	19	52	86	34	17th	QR1	—	—	—	Dave Collins	22
1936–37	Mid	42	16	6	20	75	97	38	16th	R1	—	—	—	Jack Briggs	32
1937–38	Mid; Ldn MW	42; 16	7; 8	13; 2	22; 6	67; 29	105; 31	29; 18	19th; 3rd	QR2	—	—	—	Harry Roberts	27
1938–39	Mid; Ldn MW	42; 16	20; 7	4; 1	18; 8	99; 43	77; 51	44; 15	10th; 6th	R1	—	—	—	Charlie MacCartney	52
1939–40	Mid	3	3	0	0	16	2	6	— (Note: The 1939–40 Midland League season was abandoned with three matches played when the Second World War began, and competitive football remained suspended for the duration.)	—	—	—	—	Jack Haycox	5
1945–46	Mid	36	17	3	16	63	74	37	9th	QR3 (Note: The FA Cup was contested in 1945–46. From the first round proper to the sixth round (quarter-final), results were determined on aggregate score over two legs.)	—	—	—	Ged Hustwaite	12
1946–47	Mid	42	18	12	12	90	77	48	9th	R2	—	—	—	Arnold Bramham	21
1947–48	Mid	42	22	4	16	88	78	48	6th	QR4	—	—	—	Nat Brooksbank	29
1948–49	Mid	42	15	6	21	58	83	36	16th	R1	—	—	—	Billy Guest	20
1949–50	Mid	46	23	10	13	91	70	56	4th	QR3	—	—	—	Freddie Martin	30
1950–51	Mid	42	16	15	11	69	65	47	9th	QR2	—	—	—	Freddie Martin	16
1951–52	Mid	42	20	10	12	90	71	50	5th	QR4	—	—	—	Johnny Dowson	28
1952–53	Mid	46	18	15	13	76	55	51	8th	R2	—	—	—	Freddie Martin	30
1953–54	Mid	46	27	8	11	111	73	62	2nd	R3	—	—	—	Doug Taft	45
1954–55	Mid	46	23	16	7	69	38	62	3rd	QR4	—	—	—	Jimmy Kelly	10
1955–56	Mid	46	33	11	2	137	46	77	1st	R2	—	—	—	Dennis Emery	33
1956–57	Mid	46	36	6	4	148	35	78	1st	R4	—	—	—	Dennis Emery	51
1957–58	Mid	46	35	5	6	160	46	75	1st	R1	—	—	—	Dennis Emery	53
1958–59	Mid	36	32	4	0	137	26	68	1st	R3	—	—	—	Jimmy Rayner	42
1959–60	Mid	32	23	6	3	108	37	52	1st	R4	—	—	—	Jimmy Rayner	28
1960–61	Div 4 ↑	46	28	10	8	134	65	66	1st (Note: In their first season in the Football League, Peterborough not only won the Fourth Division title, they set a League record of 134 goals which still stands, and Terry Bly's 52-goal return, while not a League record, has not been bettered since.)	R4	R1	—	—	Terry Bly (Note: Bly was top scorer in the 1960–61 Fourth Division with 52 goals.)	54 ♦
1961–62	Div 3	46	26	6	14	107	82	58	5th	R4	R1	—	—	Terry Bly	33
1962–63	Div 3	46	20	11	15	93	75	51	6th	R3	R2	—	—	George Hudson	26
1963–64	Div 3	46	18	11	17	75	70	47	10th	R1	R2	—	—	Derek Dougan	21
1964–65	Div 3	46	22	7	17	85	74	51	8th	QF	R2	—	—	Derek Dougan	25
1965–66	Div 3	46	17	12	17	80	66	46	13th	R2	SF	—	—	John Byrne	25
1966–67	Div 3	46	14	15	17	66	71	43	15th	R4	R2	—	—	John Fairbrother	23
1967–68	Div 3 ↓	46	20	10	16	79	67	50	24th (Note: Demoted for financial irregularities.)	R3	R1	—	—	John Fairbrother	14
1968–69	Div 4	46	13	16	17	60	57	42	18th	R1	R4	—	—	Jim Hall	24
1969–70	Div 4	46	17	14	15	77	69	48	9th	R4	R1	—	—	Jim Hall	27
1970–71	Div 4	46	18	7	21	70	71	43	16th	R2	R1	—	—	Colin Garwood	18
1971–72	Div 4	46	17	16	13	82	64	50	8th	R3	R1	—	—	Peter Price (Note: Price was top scorer in the 1971–72 Fourth Division with 28 goals.)	32 ♦
1972–73	Div 4	46	14	13	19	71	76	41	19th	R3	R1	—	—	Jim Hall	23
1973–74	Div 4 ↑	46	27	11	8	75	38	65	1st	R4	R1	—	—	John Cozens	25
1974–75	Div 3	46	19	12	15	47	53	50	7th	R5	R1	—	—	David Gregory	14
1975–76	Div 3	46	15	18	13	63	63	48	10th	R4	R4	—	—	David Gregory	17
1976–77	Div 3	46	13	15	18	55	65	41	16th	R2	R2	—	—	John Cozens	10
1977–78	Div 3	46	20	16	10	47	33	56	4th	R3	R3	—	—	Tommy Robson	15
1978–79	Div 3 ↓	46	11	14	21	44	63	36	21st	R1	R4	—	—	Barry Butlin	7
1979–80	Div 4	46	21	10	15	58	47	52	8th	R1	R3	—	—	Billy Kellock	23
1980–81	Div 4	46	17	18	11	68	54	52	5th	R5	R2	—	—	Robbie Cooke	29
1981–82	Div 4	46	24	10	12	71	57	82 (Note: The 1981–82 season saw the introduction of three points for a win instead of two.)	5th	R3	R1	Football League Group Cup	QF	Robbie Cooke	31 (Note: Figure includes three goals in the Football League Group Cup, regarded as competitive by Up The Posh! and by independent sources such as the English National Football Archive (ENFA) but omitted from Cooke's competitive record by the Peterborough United Football Club database.)
1982–83	Div 4	46	17	13	16	58	52	64	9th	R3	R2	Football League Group Cup	Group	Micky Gynn	21
1983–84	Div 4	46	18	14	14	72	48	68	7th	R1	R2	Associate Members' Cup	R1(S)	Alan Waddle	12
1984–85	Div 4	46	16	14	16	54	53	62	11th	R2	R1	Associate Members' Cup	R1(S)	Errington Kelly	14
1985–86	Div 4	46	13	17	16	52	64	56	17th	R5	R1	Associate Members' Cup	Prelim(S)	Jackie Gallagher	15
1986–87	Div 4	46	17	14	15	57	50	65	10th	R1	R2	Associate Members' Cup	Prelim(S)	Steve Phillips	12
1987–88	Div 4	46	20	10	16	52	53	70	7th	R2	R3	Associate Members' Cup	QF(S)	Mick Gooding	24
1988–89	Div 4	46	14	12	20	52	74	54	17th	R2	R2	Associate Members' Cup	Prelim(S)	Nick Cusack	12
1989–90	Div 4	42	17	17	12	59	46	68	9th	R2	R1	Associate Members' Cup	R1(S)	Mick Halsall	12
1990–91	Div 4 ↑	46	21	17	8	67	45	80	4th	R3	R2	Associate Members' Cup	Prelim(S)	Paul Culpin	14
1991–92	Div 3 ↑	46	20	14	12	65	58	74	6th (Note: Promoted to the second tier for the first time. After defeating Huddersfield Town 4–3 on aggregate in the semifinal of the play-offs, Peterborough beat Stockport County 2–1 in the final.)	R2	QF	Associate Members' Cup	F(S)	Ken Charlery	26
1992–93	Div 1 (Note: The newly formed FA Premier League split from the Football League, and the remaining divisions of the Football League were renumbered upwards.)	46	16	14	16	55	63	62	10th (Note: Peterborough's record high finish, of 10th in the second tier.)	R2	R2	Anglo-Italian Cup	Prelim	Tony Adcock	19
1993–94	Div 1 ↓	46	8	13	25	48	76	37	24th	R3	R4	Anglo-Italian Cup	Prelim	Tony Adcock	13
1994–95	Div 2	46	14	18	14	54	69	60	15th	R2	R1	Football League Trophy	R2(S)	Ken Charlery	19
1995–96	Div 2	46	13	13	20	59	66	52	19th	R4	R2	Football League Trophy	SF(S)	Gary Martindale (Note: Martindale was top scorer in the 1995–96 Second Division with 21 goals, of which 6 were scored for Notts County after he left Peterborough.)	18
1996–97	Div 2 ↓	46	11	14	21	55	73	47	21st	R4	R2	Football League Trophy	F(S)	Ken Charlery	13
1997–98	Div 3	46	18	13	15	63	51	67	10th	R3	R2	Football League Trophy	SF(S)	Jimmy Quinn	25
1998–99	Div 3	46	18	12	16	72	56	66	9th	R1	R1	Football League Trophy	R2(S)	Giuliano Grazioli	15
1999–2000	Div 3 ↑	46	22	12	12	63	54	78	5th (Note: After defeating Barnet 5–1 on aggregate in the semifinal of the play-offs, Peterborough beat Darlington 2–1 in the final.)	R1	R1	Football League Trophy	R2(S)	Andy Clarke	18
2000–01	Div 2	46	15	14	17	61	66	59	12th	R3	R1	Football League Trophy	R2(S)	Leon McKenzie	13
2001–02	Div 2	46	15	10	21	64	59	55	17th	R4	R2	Football League Trophy	QF(S)	Leon McKenzie	20
2002–03	Div 2	46	14	16	16	51	54	58	11th	R1	R1	Football League Trophy	R1(S)	Andy Clarke	19
2003–04	Div 2	46	12	16	18	58	58	52	18th	R3	R1	Football League Trophy	QF(S)	Andy Clarke; Leon McKenzie	12
2004–05	League 1 (Note: From the 2004–05 season, the Football League divisions were rebranded: Division One was renamed the Football League Championship, and Divisions Two and Three became Football League One and Football League Two respectively.) ↓	46	9	12	25	49	73	39	23rd	R4	R1	Football League Trophy	R1(S)	Calum Willock	14
2005–06	League 2	46	17	11	18	57	49	62	9th	R1	R1	Football League Trophy	QF(S)	Danny Crow	17
2006–07	League 2	46	18	11	17	70	61	65	10th	R3	R2	Football League Trophy	QF(S)	Danny Crow; Aaron Mclean	10
2007–08	League 2 ↑	46	28	8	10	84	43	92	2nd	R4	R2	Football League Trophy	R2(S)	Aaron Mclean	33
2008–09	League 1 ↑	46	26	11	9	78	54	89	2nd	R3	R1	Football League Trophy	R2(S)	Craig Mackail-Smith	26
2009–10	Champ ↓	46	8	10	28	46	80	34	24th	R3	R4	—	—	George Boyd	12
2010–11	League 1 ↑	46	23	10	13	106	75	79	4th (Note: After defeating Milton Keynes Dons 4–3 on aggregate in the semifinal of the play-offs, Peterborough beat Huddersfield Town 3–0 in the final.)	R3	R3	Football League Trophy	R2(S)	Craig Mackail-Smith (Note: Mackail-Smith was top scorer in the 2010–11 League One season with 27 goals.)	35 ♦
2011–12	Champ	46	13	11	22	67	77	50	18th	R3	R2	—	—	Paul Taylor	12
2012–13	Champ ↓	46	15	9	22	66	75	54	22nd	R3	R2	—	—	Dwight Gayle; Lee Tomlin	13
2013–14	League 1	46	23	5	18	72	58	74	6th (Note: Lost 3–2 on aggregate to Leyton Orient in the semifinal of the play-offs.)	R3	R3	Football League Trophy	W	Britt Assombalonga	33
2014–15	League 1	46	18	9	19	53	56	63	9th	R2	R1	Football League Trophy	R1(S)	Conor Washington	13
2015–16	League 1	46	19	6	21	82	73	63	13th	R4	R2	Football League Trophy	R1(S)	Conor Washington	15
2016–17	League 1	46	17	11	18	62	62	62	11th	R3	R2	EFL Trophy	R1(S)	Tom Nichols	13
2017–18	League 1	46	17	13	16	68	60	64	9th	R4	R1	EFL Trophy	QF	Jack Marriott (Note: Marriott was top scorer in the 2017–18 League One season with 27 goals.)	33 ♦
2018–19	League 1	46	20	12	14	71	62	72	7th	R3	R1	EFL Trophy	QF	Ivan Toney	23
2019–20	League 1	35	17	8	10	68	40	59	7th (Note: The 2019–20 football season was disrupted by the effects of the COVID-19 pandemic. The EFL was suspended in March 2020 and in June, the League One clubs voted to end the regular season programme early. Teams had not all played the same number of matches, so it was agreed to construct final league tables on a points-per-game basis. Peterborough United's 74.17 points per game placed them 7th.)	R3	R1	EFL Trophy	R2(S)	Ivan Toney (Note: Toney was top scorer in the 2019–20 League One season with 24 goals.)	26 ♦
2020–21	League 1 ↑	46	26	9	11	83	46	87	2nd	R2	R1	EFL Trophy	QF	Jonson Clarke-Harris (Note: Clarke-Harris was top scorer in the 2020–21 League One season with 31 goals.)	33 ♦
2021–22	Champ ↓	46	9	10	27	43	87	37	22nd	R5	R1	—	—	Jonson Clarke-Harris	12
2022–23	League 1	46	24	5	17	75	54	77	6th (Note: Peterborough won the first (home) leg of the play-off semifinal against Sheffield Wednesday 4–0, but conceded four goals, including a 98th-minute equaliser, in the second leg. They regained the lead in extra time via an own goal, but conceded again to take the tie to penalties. Wednesday won the shoot-out 5–3.)	R2	R2	EFL Trophy	R2(S)	Jonson Clarke-Harris (Note: Clarke-Harris was joint top scorer in the 2022–23 League One season with 26 goals.)	29 ♦
2023–24	League 1	46	25	9	12	89	61	84	4th (Note: Peterborough lost 2–1 on aggregate to Oxford United in the play-off semifinal.)	R3	R3	EFL Trophy	W	Ephron Mason-Clark	19
2024–25	League 1	46	13	12	21	51	68	51	18th	R3	R1	EFL Trophy	W	Ricky-Jade Jones	17
2025–26	League 1	46	15	8	23	64	68	53	18th	R2	R1	EFL Trophy	R2(S)	Harry Leonard	17
