= 1990–91 Northampton Town F.C. season =

Northampton Town
1990–91 season
- Chairman: Dick Underwood
- Manager: Theo Foley
- Stadium: County Ground
- Division Four: 10th
- FA Cup: Second round
- Rumbelows Cup: Second round
- Leyland DAF Cup: First round (s)
- Top goalscorer: League: Bobby Barnes (13); All: Bobby Barnes (16)
- Highest home attendance: 5,549 vs Peterborough United
- Lowest home attendance: 2,544 vs Lincoln City
- Average home league attendance: 3,710

The 1990–91 season was Northampton Town's 94th season in their history and the first season back in the Fourth Division after relegation the previous year. Alongside competing in Division Four, the club also participated in the FA Cup, League Cup and Associate Members' Cup.

== Players ==
As of match played 11 May 1991.

| Name | Position | Nat. | Place of birth | Date of birth (age) | Apps | Goals | Previous club | Date signed | Fee |
Goalkeepers
| Peter Gleasure | GK | (England) | Luton | 8 October 1960 (aged 30) | 411 | 0 | Millwall | March 1983 | |
Defenders
| Terry Angus | CB | (England) | Coventry | 14 January 1966 (aged 25) | 48 | 2 | VS Rugby | July 1990 | |
| Irvin Gernon | LB | (England) | Birmingham | 30 December 1962 (aged 28) | 27 | 2 | Reading | October 1989 | £25,000 |
| David Johnson | LB | (England) | Northampton | 10 March 1967 (aged 24) | 35 | 0 | Irthlingborough Diamonds | July 1989 | Free |
| Steve Terry | CB | (England) | Clapton | 14 June 1962 (aged 28) | 73 | 8 | Hull City | March 1990 | £70,000 |
| Wayne Williams | RB | (England) | Telford | 17 November 1963 (aged 27) | 68 | 1 | Shrewsbury Town | 12 January 1988 | |
| Paul Wilson | LB | (England) | Bradford | 2 August 1968 (aged 22) | 148 | 6 | Norwich City | February 1988 | £30,000 |
| Darren Wood | CB | (England) | Derby | 2 October 1968 (aged 22) | 3 | 1 | Reading | July 1990 | Part Exchange |
Midfielders
| Micky Bell | W | (England) | Newcastle upon Tyne | 15 November 1971 (aged 19) | 37 | 0 | Apprentice | April 1990 | N/A |
| Stuart Beavon | CM | (England) | Wolverhampton | 30 November 1958 (aged 32) | 50 | 13 | Reading | July 1990 | Part Exchange |
| Steve Berry | CM | (England) | Liverpool | 4 April 1963 (aged 28) | 123 | 10 | Aldershot | 27 October 1988 | £45,000 |
| Steve Brown | CM | (England) | Northampton | 6 July 1966 (aged 24) | 89 | 7 | Irthlingborough Diamonds | 21 July 1989 | Free |
| Phil Chard | U | (England) | Corby | 16 October 1960 (aged 30) | 224 | 40 | Wolverhampton Wanderers | October 1989 | |
| Trevor Quow | CM | (England) | Peterborough | 28 September 1970 (aged 20) | 67 | 2 | Gillingham | 12 January 1989 | |
| David Scope | W | (England) | Newcastle upon Tyne | 10 May 1967 (aged 24) | 17 | 0 | Blyth Spartans | September 1989 | |
| Aidey Thorpe | LW | (England) | Chesterfield | 25 November 1963 (aged 27) | 47 | 4 | Walsall | March 1990 | £50,000 |
Forwards
| Tony Adcock | FW | (England) | Bethnal Green | 27 March 1963 (aged 28) | 104 | 37 | Bradford City | January 1991 | £75,000 |
| Bobby Barnes | FW | (England) | Kingston upon Thames | 17 December 1962 (aged 28) | 97 | 36 | Bournemouth | 13 October 1989 | £70,000 |
| Greg Campbell | FW | (England) | Portsmouth | 13 July 1965 (aged 25) | 31 | 5 | Plymouth Argyle | September 1990 | |
| Kevin Wilkin | FW | (England) | Cambridge | 1 October 1967 (aged 23) | 12 | 4 | Cambridge City | July 1990 | |

== Competitions ==
=== Barclays League Division Four ===
==== League table ====
| Pos | Team | Pld | W | D | L | GF | GA | GD | Pts | Promotion |
|---|---|---|---|---|---|---|---|---|---|---|
| 8 | Scunthorpe United | 46 | 20 | 11 | 15 | 71 | 62 | +9 | 71 | Qualification for the Fourth Division play-offs |
| 9 | Scarborough | 46 | 19 | 12 | 15 | 59 | 56 | +3 | 69 | |
| 10 | Northampton Town | 46 | 18 | 13 | 15 | 57 | 58 | −1 | 67 | |
| 11 | Doncaster Rovers | 46 | 17 | 14 | 15 | 56 | 46 | +10 | 65 | |
| 12 | Rochdale | 46 | 15 | 17 | 14 | 50 | 53 | −3 | 62 | |

==== Results summary ====
| Overall | | | | | | | | Home | | | | | | Away | | | | | |
| Pld | W | D | L | GF | GA | GD | Pts | W | D | L | GF | GA | GD | W | D | L | GF | GA | GD |
|---|---|---|---|---|---|---|---|---|---|---|---|---|---|---|---|---|---|---|---|
| 46 | 18 | 13 | 15 | 57 | 58 | −1 | 67 | 14 | 5 | 4 | 34 | 21 | +13 | 4 | 8 | 11 | 23 | 37 | −14 |

Last updated: 8 March 2022.

==== League position by match ====
| Round | 1 | 2 | 3 | 4 | 5 | 6 | 7 | 8 | 9 | 10 | 11 | 12 | 13 | 14 | 15 | 16 | 17 | 18 | 19 | 20 | 21 | 22 | 23 | 24 | 25 | 26 | 27 | 28 | 29 | 30 | 31 | 32 | 33 | 34 | 35 | 36 | 37 | 38 | 39 | 40 | 41 | 42 | 43 | 44 | 45 | 46 |
|---|---|---|---|---|---|---|---|---|---|---|---|---|---|---|---|---|---|---|---|---|---|---|---|---|---|---|---|---|---|---|---|---|---|---|---|---|---|---|---|---|---|---|---|---|---|---|
| Ground | A | A | H | A | A | H | H | A | A | H | H | A | A | H | H | A | H | A | H | A | H | H | H | H | H | A | H | A | A | A | H | H | A | H | A | H | A | H | A | A | H | A | H | H | A | A |
| Result | W | W | W | D | D | L | W | L | D | W | W | D | L | W | W | W | W | L | D | D | D | W | W | W | L | L | W | W | D | L | D | D | L | W | D | W | L | W | L | L | L | D | L | L | L | L |
| Position | 5 | 2 | 2 | 2 | 2 | 4 | 3 | 5 | 7 | 4 | 2 | 4 | 5 | 3 | 2 | 2 | 1 | 1 | 1 | 3 | 4 | 3 | 2 | 1 | 1 | 3 | 1 | 2 | 2 | 2 | 2 | 2 | 3 | 3 | 3 | 3 | 3 | 3 | 3 | 6 | 7 | 7 | 7 | 8 | 9 | 10 |

Source: 11v11.com
A = Away; H = Home; W = Win; D = Draw; L = Loss

==== Matches ====
Win Draw Loss

| 25 August 1990 1 | Hereford United | 1–2 | Northampton Town | Hereford |
| 15:00 BST | | | K.Wilkin; B.Barnes | Stadium: Edgar Street; Attendance: 3,187 |

| 1 September 1990 2 | Maidstone United | 1–3 | Northampton Town | Dartford |
| 15:00 BST | | | P.Wilson; D.Wood; A.Thorpe | Stadium: Watling Street; Attendance: 2,049 |

| 8 September 1990 3 | Northampton Town | 1–0 | Blackpool | Northampton |
| 15:00 BST | B.Barnes 54' | | | Stadium: County Ground; Attendance: 4,544 |

| 14 September 1990 4 | Aldershot | 3–3 | Northampton Town | Aldershot |
| 19:30 BST | | | K.Wilkin; B.Barnes; S.Beavon | Stadium: Recreation Ground; Attendance: 2,741 |

| 18 September 1990 5 | Scarborough | 1–1 | Northampton Town | Scarborough |
| 19:30 BST | | | B.Barnes pen.' | Stadium: Athletic Ground; Attendance: 1,525 |

| 22 September 1990 6 | Northampton Town | 1–2 | Peterborough United | Northampton |
| 15:00 BST | B.Barnes | | | Stadium: County Ground; Attendance: 5,549 |

| 29 September 1990 7 | Northampton Town | 1–0 | Halifax Town | Northampton |
| 15:00 BST | D.Collins | | | Stadium: County Ground; Attendance: 2,977 |

| 2 October 1990 8 | Burnley | 3–0 | Northampton Town | Burnley |
| 19:30 BST | | | | Stadium: Turf Moor; Attendance: 6,273 |

| 6 October 1990 9 | Chesterfield | 0–0 | Northampton Town | Chesterfield |
| 15:00 BST | | | | Stadium: Saltergate; Attendance: 3,826 |

| 13 October 1990 10 | Northampton Town | 1–0 | Stockport County | Northampton |
| 15:00 BST | P.Chard | | | Stadium: County Ground; Attendance: 3,927 |

| 19 October 1990 11 | Northampton Town | 5–0 | Walsall | Northampton |
| 19:30 BST | B.Barnes; S.Terry; G.Campbell; P.Chard | | | Stadium: County Ground; Attendance: 4,055 |

| 23 October 1990 12 | Darlington | 1–1 | Northampton Town | Darlington |
| 19:30 BST | | | B.Barnes | Stadium: Feethams; Attendance: 4,882 |

| 23 October 1990 13 | Lincoln City | 3–1 | Northampton Town | Lincoln |
| 15:00 BST | | | S.Terry | Stadium: Sincil Bank; Attendance: 3,352 |

| 3 November 1990 14 | Northampton Town | 3–2 | Hartlepool United | Northampton |
| 15:00 GMT | P.Wilson; S.Beavon | | | Stadium: County Ground; Attendance: 3,342 |

| 9 November 1990 15 | Northampton Town | 1–0 | Wrexham | Northampton |
| 19:30 GMT | B.Barnes | | | Stadium: County Ground; Attendance: 3,855 |

| 24 November 1990 16 | York City | 0–1 | Northampton Town | York |
| 15:00 GMT | | | B.Barnes | Stadium: Bootham Crescent; Attendance: 2,202 |

| 1 December 1990 17 | Northampton Town | 3–2 | Rochdale | Northampton |
| 15:00 GMT | P.Chard; S.Beavon | | | Stadium: County Ground; Attendance: 3,809 |

| 15 December 1990 18 | Carlisle United | 4–1 | Northampton Town | Carlisle |
| 15:00 GMT | | | G.Campbell | Stadium: Brunton Park; Attendance: 2,872 |

| 21 December 1990 19 | Northampton Town | 0–0 | Cardiff City | Northampton |
| 19:30 GMT | | | | Stadium: County Ground; Attendance: 3,033 |

| 29 December 1990 20 | Gillingham | 0–0 | Northampton Town | Gillingham |
| 15:00 GMT | | | | Stadium: Priestfield; Attendance: 4,969 |

| 1 January 1991 21 | Northampton Town | 0–0 | Doncaster Rovers | Northampton |
| 15:00 GMT | | | | Stadium: County Ground; Attendance: 5,270 |

| 12 January 1991 22 | Northampton Town | 2–0 | Maidstone United | Northampton |
| 15:00 GMT | T.Adcock; B.Barnes | | | Stadium: County Ground; Attendance: 3,710 |

| 19 January 1991 23 | Northampton Town | 3–0 | Hereford United | Northampton |
| 15:00 GMT | P.Chard; S.Beavon pen.' T.Angus | | | Stadium: County Ground; Attendance: 3,577 |

| 26 January 1991 24 | Northampton Town | 2–1 | Aldershot | Northampton |
| 15:00 GMT | T.Adcock; S.Beavon pen.' | | | Stadium: County Ground; Attendance: 3,800 |

| 1 February 1991 25 | Northampton Town | 0–2 | Scarborough | Northampton |
| 19:30 GMT | | | | Stadium: County Ground; Attendance: 4,058 |

| 5 February 1991 26 | Peterborough United | 1–0 | Northampton Town | Peterborough |
| 19:30 GMT | | | | Stadium: London Road; Attendance: 5,952 |

| 15 February 1991 27 | Northampton Town | 2–1 | York City | Northampton |
| 19:30 GMT | T.Angus; B.Barnes | | | Stadium: County Ground; Attendance: 2,685 |

| 23 February 1991 28 | Wrexham | 0–2 | Northampton Town | Wrexham, Wales |
| 15:00 GMT | | | S.Terry; B.Barnes | Stadium: Racecourse Ground; Attendance: 1,790 |

| 2 March 1991 29 | Rochdale | 1–1 | Northampton Town | Rochdale |
| 15:00 GMT | | | S.Beavon pen.' | Stadium: Spotland; Attendance: 1,890 |

| 5 March 1991 30 | Scunthorpe United | 3–0 | Northampton Town | Scunthorpe |
| 19:30 GMT | | | | Stadium: Glanford Park; Attendance: 2,852 |
Note: Fixture was previously postponed on 26 December 1990 due to a waterlogged pitch.

| 9 March 1991 31 | Northampton Town | 1–1 | Carlisle United | Northampton |
| 15:00 GMT | G.Campbell | | | Stadium: County Ground; Attendance: 3,216 |

| 12 March 1991 32 | Northampton Town | 0–0 | Burnley | Northampton |
| 19:30 GMT | | | | Stadium: County Ground; Attendance: 3,710 |

| 15 March 1991 33 | Halifax Town | 2–1 | Northampton Town | Halifax |
| 19:30 GMT | | | S.Brown | Stadium: The Shay; Attendance: 1,347 |

| 23 March 1991 34 | Northampton Town | 2–0 | Chesterfield | Northampton |
| 15:00 GMT | P.Chard; S.Beavon pen.' | | | Stadium: County Ground; Attendance: 3,379 |

| 26 March 1991 35 | Torquay United | 0–0 | Northampton Town | Torquay |
| 19:30 GMT | | | | Stadium: Plainmoor; Attendance: 2,745 |

| 30 March 1991 36 | Northampton Town | 2–1 | Scunthorpe United | Northampton |
| 15:00 GMT | S.Terry; S.Beavon pen.' | | | Stadium: County Ground; Attendance: 3,728 |

| 1 April 1991 37 | Cardiff City | 1–0 | Northampton Town | Cardiff, Wales |
| 15:00 BST | | | | Stadium: Ninian Park; Attendance: 4,805 |

| 6 April 1991 38 | Northampton Town | 2–1 | Gillingham | Northampton |
| 15:00 BST | S.Berry; P.Chard | | | Stadium: County Ground; Attendance: 2,993 |

| 9 April 1991 39 | Stockport County | 2–0 | Northampton Town | Stockport |
| 19:30 BST | | | | Stadium: Edgeley Park; Attendance: 3,707 |

| 13 April 1991 40 | Doncaster Rovers | 2–1 | Northampton Town | Doncaster |
| 15:00 BST | | | S.Beavon | Stadium: Belle Vue; Attendance: 2,939 |

| 16 April 1991 41 | Northampton Town | 1–4 | Torquay United | Northampton |
| 15:00 BST | T.Adcock | | | Stadium: County Ground; Attendance: 2,678 |

| 20 April 1991 42 | Walsall | 3–3 | Northampton Town | Walsall |
| 15:00 BST | | | B.Barnes; S.Beavon; S.Terry | Stadium: Bescot Stadium; Attendance: 3,345 |

| 27 April 1991 43 | Northampton Town | 0–3 | Darlington | Northampton |
| 15:00 BST | | | | Stadium: County Ground; Attendance: 4,884 |

| 30 April 1991 44 | Northampton Town | 1–1 | Lincoln City | Northampton |
| 19:30 BST | S.Berry | | | Stadium: County Ground; Attendance: 2,544 |

| 7 May 1991 45 | Blackpool | 2–1 | Northampton Town | Blackpool |
| 19:30 BST | | | S.Terry | Stadium: Bloomfield Road; Attendance: 7,298 |

| 11 May 1991 46 | Hartlepool United | 3–1 | Northampton Town | Hartlepool |
| 15:00 BST | | | S.Brown | Stadium: Victoria Park; Attendance: 6,957 |

=== FA Cup ===
| 17 November 1990 First round | Littlehampton Town | 0–4 | Northampton Town | Littlehampton |
| 14:00 GMT | | | S.Beavon; B.Barnes; G.Campbell | Stadium: The Sportsfield; Attendance: 3,800 |

| 8 December 1990 Second round | Barnet | 0–0 | Northampton Town | Chipping Barnet, London |
| 15:00 GMT | | | | Stadium: Underhill; Attendance: 5,022 |

| 12 December 1990 Second round (r) | Northampton Town | 0–1 | Barnet | Northampton |
| 19:45 GMT | | | | Stadium: County Ground; Attendance: 5,387 |

=== Rumbelows Cup ===
| 29 August 1990 First round 1st leg | Brighton & Hove Albion | 0–2 | Northampton Town | Hove |
| 19:30 BST | | | K.Wilkin | Stadium: Goldstone Ground; Attendance: 3,834 |

| 4 September 1990 First round 2nd leg | Northampton Town | 1–1 | Brighton & Hove Albion | Northampton |
| 19:30 BST | S.Brown | | | Stadium: County Ground; Attendance: 4,760 |

| 25 September 1990 Second round 1st leg | Northampton Town | 0–1 | Sheffield United | Northampton |
| 19:30 BST | | | | Stadium: County Ground; Attendance: 6,910 |

| 10 October 1990 Second round 2nd leg | Sheffield United | 2–1 | Northampton Town | Sheffield |
| 19:30 BST | | | B.Barnes | Stadium: Bramall Lane; Attendance: 8,679 |

=== Leyland DAF Cup ===
| 7 November 1990 Prelim round (s) | Stoke City | 1–1 | Northampton Town | Stoke-on-Trent |
| 19:30 GMT | | | S.Beavon | Stadium: Victoria Ground; Attendance: 4,339 |

| 27 November 1990 Prelim round (s) | Northampton Town | 1–2 | Mansfield Town | Northampton |
| 19:30 GMT | S.Beavon | | | Stadium: County Ground; Attendance: 2,186 |

| 19 February 1991 First round (s) | Torquay United | 2–0 | Northampton Town | Torquay |
| 19:30 GMT | | | | Stadium: Plainmoor; Attendance: 2,112 |

=== Appearances and goals ===
| Pos | Player | Division Four | | | FA Cup | | | League Cup | | | League Trophy | | | Total | | |
| Pos | Player | Starts | Sub | Goals | Starts | Sub | Goals | Starts | Sub | Goals | Starts | Sub | Goals | Starts | Sub | Goals |
|---|---|---|---|---|---|---|---|---|---|---|---|---|---|---|---|---|
| GK | Peter Gleasure | 16 | – | – | 3 | – | – | 4 | – | – | – | – | – | 23 | – | – |
| DF | Terry Angus | 42 | – | 2 | – | 1 | – | 3 | – | – | 2 | – | – | 47 | 1 | 2 |
| DF | Irvin Gernon | 8 | – | – | 1 | – | – | – | – | – | – | – | – | 9 | – | – |
| DF | David Johnson | 8 | 17 | – | 2 | – | – | – | – | – | – | 1 | – | 10 | 18 | – |
| DF | Steve Terry | 46 | – | 6 | 3 | – | – | 4 | – | – | 3 | – | – | 56 | – | 6 |
| DF | Wayne Williams | 10 | 4 | – | 1 | – | – | 4 | – | – | 2 | – | – | 17 | 4 | – |
| DF | Paul Wilson | 44 | – | 3 | 3 | – | – | 4 | – | – | 3 | – | – | 54 | – | 3 |
| DF | Darren Wood | 2 | – | 1 | – | – | – | 1 | – | – | – | – | – | 3 | – | 1 |
| MF | Stuart Beavon | 41 | – | 10 | 3 | – | 1 | 4 | – | – | 2 | – | 2 | 50 | – | 13 |
| MF | Micky Bell | 22 | 6 | – | – | – | – | 1 | 1 | – | 1 | – | – | 24 | 7 | – |
| MF | Steve Berry | 20 | 7 | 2 | – | 1 | – | 3 | – | – | 1 | 1 | – | 24 | 9 | 2 |
| MF | Steve Brown | 37 | 3 | 2 | 3 | – | – | 4 | – | 1 | 3 | – | – | 47 | 3 | 3 |
| MF | Phil Chard | 43 | – | 7 | 3 | – | – | 4 | – | – | 3 | – | – | 53 | – | 7 |
| MF | Trevor Quow | 12 | 1 | – | – | – | – | – | – | – | 1 | – | – | 13 | 1 | – |
| MF | David Scope | 3 | 4 | – | – | 2 | – | – | – | – | – | – | – | 3 | 6 | – |
| MF | Aidey Thorpe | 12 | 15 | 1 | 2 | – | – | – | 2 | – | 3 | – | – | 17 | 17 | 1 |
| FW | Tony Adcock | 20 | 1 | 3 | – | – | – | – | – | – | – | – | – | 20 | 1 | 3 |
| FW | Bobby Barnes | 42 | 1 | 13 | 3 | – | 2 | 4 | – | 1 | 2 | – | 1 | 45 | 1 | 16 |
| FW | Greg Campbell | 20 | 5 | 4 | 3 | – | 1 | – | 1 | – | 2 | – | – | 25 | 6 | 5 |
| FW | Kevin Wilkin | 7 | 2 | 2 | – | – | – | 3 | – | 2 | – | – | – | 10 | 2 | 4 |
Players who left before end of season:
| GK | Marlon Beresford | 13 | – | – | – | – | – | – | – | – | 2 | – | – | 15 | – | – |
| GK | Kevin Hitchcock | 17 | – | – | – | – | – | – | – | – | 1 | – | – | 18 | – | – |
| DF | Greg Fee | 1 | – | – | – | – | – | 2 | – | – | – | – | – | 3 | – | – |
| DF | Pat Scully | 15 | – | – | – | – | – | 1 | – | – | 1 | – | – | 16 | – | – |
| MF | Bradley Sandeman | – | 5 | – | – | – | – | – | 2 | – | 1 | 1 | – | 1 | 8 | – |
| FW | Darren Collins | 3 | 5 | 1 | 1 | 1 | – | 1 | 1 | – | – | 2 | – | 5 | 9 | 1 |
| FW | Gareth Evans | 2 | – | – | – | – | – | – | – | – | – | – | – | 2 | – | – |
