= Philliskirk =

Philliskirk is a surname. Notable people with the surname include:

- Tony Philliskirk (born 1965), English footballer
- Danny Philliskirk (born 1991), English footballer
