= Dominic Iorfa =

Dominic Iorfa may refer to:

- Dominic Iorfa (footballer, born 1968), Nigerian footballer
- Dominic Iorfa (footballer, born 1995), English footballer
