= Noel Luke =

English footballer (born 1964)

Personal information
- Full name: Noel Emmanuel Luke
- Date of birth: 28 December 1964 (age 61)
- Place of birth: Birmingham, England
- Height: 5 ft 11 in (1.80 m)
- Positions: Defender; midfielder

Youth career
- West Bromwich Albion

Senior career*
Years	Team	Apps	(Gls)
1982–1984	West Bromwich Albion	9	(1)
1984–1986	Mansfield Town	50	(9)
1986–1993	Peterborough United	277	(27)
1993	Rochdale	3	(0)
1993–????	Boston United		
- Holbeach United
- Corby Town
- King's Lynn
- Raunds Town
- * Club domestic league appearances and goals

Noel Emmanuel Luke (born 28 December 1964) is an English former footballer who played as a right back and winger in the Football League during the 1980s and 1990s, most notably with Peterborough United.

== Career ==
Luke was born in Birmingham, and started his career with West Bromwich Albion, whose youth academy he joined aged 14. He made his West Brom debut aged 17, but only managed 9 League appearances for them. He left the club in 1984 to join Mansfield Town after West Brom disbanded their reserve team and after 50 League games with them he moved in 1986 to Peterborough United. He was to go on to play 277 League games for the Posh, and he scored for them in Mark Lawrenson's managerial debut for Peterborough. His last game for the club was on 20 March 1993 against Oxford United. He was on a week-to-week contract prior to the termination of his contract, and was released in March 1993 by manager Lil Fuccillo to make space in his squad for new signing Chris Greenman.

After leaving Peterborough he had a short spell at Rochdale, making his last Football League appearance on 10 April 1993 as a substitute against Scunthorpe United. He then moved into non-league football with Boston United. He later had spells with Holbeach United, Corby Town, King's Lynn and Raunds Town.

== After football ==
After retiring from football, Luke operated the in-stadium "pub" at Peterborough United's ground and also worked in matchday hospitality at the club. More recently, he has worked as a HGV driver for Tesco.

== Honours ==
Peterborough United

- Football League Third Division play-offs: 1992
