= Greg Campbell (footballer) =

English footballer

Personal information
- Full name: Gregory Robert Campbell
- Date of birth: 13 July 1965 (age 61)
- Place of birth: Portsmouth, Hampshire, England
- Height: 5 ft 11 in (1.80 m)
- Position: Forward

Youth career
- –1984: West Ham United

Senior career*
| Years | Team | Apps | (Gls) |
| 1984–1988 | West Ham United | 5 | (0) |
| 1987 | → Brighton & Hove Albion (loan) | 2 | (0) |
| 1987–1988 | → Sparta Rotterdam (loan) | 15 | (2) |
| 1988–1990 | Plymouth Argyle | 39 | (6) |
| 1990–1992 | Northampton Town | 47 | (7) |
- * Club domestic league appearances and goals as of 16:53, 1 February 2013 (UTC)

Gregory Robert Campbell (born 13 July 1965) is an English former footballer who played as a forward for West Ham United, Brighton & Hove Albion, Sparta Rotterdam, Plymouth Argyle and Northampton Town.

== Playing career ==
Born in Portsmouth, Campbell started his football career in the youth team at West Ham United making his first team debut on 4 September 1984 in a 3–1 home win against Coventry City. In his second game, against Watford he suffered a broken jaw and did not play first-team football until 24 August 1985. The success of Tony Cottee and Frank McAvennie as West Ham's main strikers particularly during season 1985-86, meant Campbell played only two more games for West Ham. In the 1987–88 season he had a loan period with Brighton & Hove Albion playing only two games and a loan with Dutch side Sparta Rotterdam. In 1988, he left West Ham and joined Plymouth Argyle making his debut in November 1988 in a 6–2 defeat by Chelsea in the 1st round of the Simod Cup. He remained with Plymouth for only two seasons before moving to his last club, Northampton Town in 1990, to work with former teammate, Bobby Barnes. Again lasting only two seasons, Campbell retired from the game in 1992. Campbell is the son of former Fulham, Portsmouth and Chelsea manager, Bobby Campbell.
