= Nicky Limber =

English footballer

Personal information
- Full name: Nicholas Limber
- Date of birth: 23 January 1974 (age 52)
- Place of birth: Doncaster, England
- Position: Defender

Team information
- Current team: Doncaster Rovers (youth team coach)

Youth career
- Doncaster Rovers

Senior career*
| Years | Team | Apps | (Gls) |
| 1990–1992 | Doncaster Rovers | 13 | (1) |
| 1992–1993 | Manchester City | 0 | (0) |
| 1992 | → Peterborough United (loan) | 2 | (0) |
| 1993–1996 | Doncaster Rovers | 4 | (0) |
| 1996–1997 | Weymouth | 68 | (5) |
| 1996–1998 | Gainsborough Trinity | | |
- * Club domestic league appearances and goals

Nicholas Limber (born 23 January 1974) is an English football coach and former professional footballer who played as a defender. He is now a first team coach with Rossington Main FC and manager of the Hall Cross first team.

== Playing career ==
Limber came through the academy at Doncaster Rovers and went on to make 13 appearances before being sold to Manchester City He spent time on loan with Peterborough United before returning to Doncaster on a permanent contract. He later played non-league football for both Weymouth and Gainsborough Trinity.

== Coaching career ==
Limber works for Doncaster Rovers as a youth team coach.
