= Jimmy Rayner =

English footballer (1935–2009)

Personal information
- Full name: James Patrick Rayner
- Date of birth: 31 March 1935
- Place of birth: Cornsay, England
- Date of death: 5 January 2009 (aged 73)
- Place of death: Durham, England
- Positions: Wing half; striker

Senior career*
Years	Team	Apps	(Gls)
1952–1954	Grimsby Town	12	(3)
1954	Bury	0	(0)
1954–1955	Hartlepool United	0	(0)
1955	Bury	0	(0)
1955–1957	Barrow	11	(1)
1957–1958	Grantham Town	36	(35)
1958–1963	Peterborough United	119	(12)
1963–1964	Grantham Town	51	(78)
1964–1965	Notts County	32	(13)
- Ilkeston Town
- Boston United
- Durham City
- Gateshead
- * Club domestic league appearances and goals

James Patrick Rayner (31 March 1935 – 5 January 2009) was an English footballer, who played for a number of clubs in the English lower leagues. Playing at wing-half, Rayner was most notably a member of the Peterborough United side that won the Division Four title in their début season at league level.

Prior to joining Peterborough, Rayner, a native of Cornsay, County Durham, had begun his football career as a striker at Grimsby Town, and later had short spells at Bury, Hartlepool United, Barrow and non-league Grantham Town before joining Peterborough in 1958. He spent five seasons at Peterborough before rejoining Grantham as player-coach in 1963.

Moving back to the striker position, Rayner scored an incredible 71 goals in 45 matches for Grantham in 1963–64, leading the Gingerbreads to their first Midland League title. The following season, he returned to the professional ranks, spending one season at Notts County.

After leaving Notts County, Rayner became player-manager at Ilkeston Town and set a club-record scoring 55 goals in one season at Boston United, before returning to his native North East, where he played for Durham City and Gateshead.
