= David Robinson (footballer, born 1965) =

English footballer (born 1965)

Personal information
- Full name: David Alan Robinson
- Date of birth: 14 January 1965 (age 61)
- Place of birth: Haverton Hill, England
- Height: 6 ft 0 in (1.83 m)
- Position: Central defender

Senior career*
| Years | Team | Apps | (Gls) |
| 1982–1983 | Billingham Town | | |
| 1983–1986 | Hartlepool United | 66 | (1) |
| 1986–1989 | Halifax Town | 72 | (1) |
| 1989–1992 | Peterborough United | 95 | (9) |
| 1992–1994 | Notts County | 3 | (1) |
| 1994–? | Corby Town | | |
- Ilkeston Town
- Gresley Rovers
| ?–2000 | King's Lynn | | |
| Total | | 236 | (12) |
- * Club domestic league appearances and goals

David Alan Robinson (born 14 January 1965) is an English former footballer who played as a central defender in the Football League for Hartlepool United, Halifax Town, Peterborough United and Notts County.

Born in Haverton Hill in County Durham, Robinson made 236 appearances in the Football League, scoring 12 goals, before joining Corby Town in 1994. He went on to play for Ilkeston Town and Gresley Rovers, ending his career at King's Lynn.

== Honours ==
Peterborough United

- Football League Third Division play-offs: 1992
