= Dennis Emery =

English footballer (1933–1986)

Personal information
- Full name: Dennis Emery
- Date of birth: 4 October 1933
- Place of birth: Sandy, England
- Date of death: 1 May 1986 (aged 52)
- Place of death: Bedford, England
- Position: Inside forward

Youth career
- Eynesbury Rovers
- –1950: Tottenham Hotspur

Senior career*
Years	Team	Apps	(Gls)
1950–1954	Eynesbury Rovers	0	(0)
1954–1963	Peterborough United	267	(195)
1963–1964	Bedford Town	37	(4)

Managerial career
- 1965–1966: Bedford Town (reserves)
- 1969–1970: Bedford Town (reserves)
- * Club domestic league appearances and goals

Dennis Emery (4 October 1933 – 1 May 1986) was an English professional footballer who made 311 appearances and scored 229 goals as an inside forward for Peterborough United. Emery is a member of the club's Hall of Fame and in a Football League 125th anniversary poll was voted by the Peterborough United supporters as the club's second-best ever player.

== Career statistics ==
Appearances and goals by club, season and competition
Club	Season	League			FA Cup		League Cup		Other		Total	
Club	Season	Division	Apps	Goals	Apps	Goals	Apps	Goals	Apps	Goals	Apps	Goals
Peterborough United	1954–55	Midland League	13	5	1	1	—		—		14	6
Peterborough United	1955–56	Midland League	45	27	4	5	—		1 (Note: Appearance in Bancroft Cup)	0	50	33
Peterborough United	1956–57	Midland League	44	42	6	8	—		2 (Note: Appearances in Maunsell Cup)	1	52	51
Peterborough United	1957–58	Midland League	44	48	3	2	—		2	3	49	53
Peterborough United	1958–59	Midland League	35	27	6	7	—		1 (Note: Appearance in East Anglian Cup)	0	42	34
Peterborough United	1959–60	Midland League	18	17	5	5	—		—		23	22
Peterborough United	1960–61	Fourth Division	46	15	3	0	1	0	2 (Note: Appearances in Northamptonshire Senior Cup)	1	52	17
Peterborough United	1961–62	Third Division	19	14	2	1	1	0	—		22	15
Peterborough United	1962–63	Third Division	3	0	1	0	0	0	3 (Note: 1 appearance in Northamptonshire Senior Cup, 1 appearance in Midland Floodlit Cup, 1 appearance in Huntingdonshire Premier Cup)	0	6	0
Career Total			267	195	31	29	2	0	11	5	311	229

== Honours ==
Peterborough United

- Midland League (5): 1955–56, 1956–57, 1957–58, 1958–59, 1959–60
- Football League Fourth Division (1): 1960–61

Individual

- Peterborough United Hall of Fame
