= Lee Howarth =

English football defender

Personal information
- Full name: Lee Howarth
- Date of birth: 3 January 1968 (age 58)
- Place of birth: Bolton, England
- Position: Defender

Senior career*
| Years | Team | Apps | (Gls) |
| 1984 - 1986 | Blackpool | 0 | (0) |
| 1986 - 1989 | Horwich RMI | 56 | (4) |
| 1989 - 1991 | Chorley | 30 | (1) |
| 1991–1994 | Peterborough United | 62 | (1) |
| 1991 | → Boston Town (loan) | 1 | (0) |
| 1991 | → Boston United (loan) | 10 | (0) |
| 1992 | → St. Patrick's Athletic (loan) | 6 | (0) |
| 1992 | → Kettering Town (loan) | 10 | (1) |
| 1992 | → Boston United (loan) | 6 | (0) |
| 1994–1996 | Mansfield Town | 57 | (2) |
| 1996–1998 | Barnet | 102 | (5) |
| 1998–2000 | Stevenage Borough | 82 | (2) |
| 2000 - 2001 | Boston United | 35 | (4) |
| 2001–2003 | Kettering Town | 50 | (3) |
| 2003 - 2007 | Bedford Town | 185 | (20) |
| 2007 - 2008 | Deeping Rangers | 10 | (0) |
| 2008 - 2010 | Bedford Town | 0 | (0) |
- * Club domestic league appearances and goals

Lee Howarth (born 3 January 1968) is an English former footballer who played in the Football League for Barnet, Mansfield Town and Peterborough United.

== Honours ==
Peterborough United

- Football League Third Division play-offs: 1992
