= Ronnie Robinson (footballer) =

English footballer

Personal information
- Full name: Ronald Robinson
- Date of birth: 22 October 1966 (age 60)
- Place of birth: Sunderland, England
- Height: 5 ft 9 in (1.75 m)
- Position: Defender

Senior career*
Years	Team	Apps	(Gls)
1984–1985	Ipswich Town	0	(0)
1985–1987	Leeds United	27	(0)
1987–1989	Doncaster Rovers	78	(5)
1989	West Bromwich Albion	1	(0)
1989–1991	Rotherham United	86	(2)
1991–1993	Peterborough United	47	(0)
1993–1995	Exeter City	39	(1)
1994	→ Huddersfield Town (loan)	2	(0)
1995	Scarborough	1	(0)
–	Spennymoor United		
- * Club domestic league appearances and goals

Ronald Robinson (born 22 October 1966) is an English former professional footballer who played as a defender in the Football League for Leeds United F.C., Doncaster Rovers, West Bromwich Albion, Rotherham United, Peterborough United, Exeter City, Huddersfield Town and Scarborough.

== Honours ==
Peterborough United

- Football League Third Division play-offs: 1992
