= Freddie Martin (footballer) =

English footballer (1925–1969)

Personal information
- Full name: Frederick Arthur Martin
- Date of birth: 13 December 1925
- Place of birth: Nottingham, England
- Date of death: September 1969 (aged 43)
- Place of death: Nottingham, England
- Position: Centre forward

Senior career*
| Years | Team | Apps | (Gls) |
| –1944 | Cinderhill Colliery | | |
| 1944–1949 | Nottingham Forest | 5 | (0) |
| 1949–1956 | Peterborough United | 238 | (124) |
- Skegness Town
- * Club domestic league appearances and goals

Frederick Arthur Martin (13 December 1925 – September 1969) was an English professional footballer who made over 230 appearances in the Midland League for Peterborough United as a centre forward. He briefly played in the Football League for Nottingham Forest.

== Career statistics ==
Appearances and goals by club, season and competition
| Club | Season | League | | | FA Cup | | Other | | Total | |
| Club | Season | Division | Apps | Goals | Apps | Goals | Apps | Goals | Apps | Goals |
|---|---|---|---|---|---|---|---|---|---|---|
| Nottingham Forest | 1947–48 | Second Division | 2 | 0 | 0 | 0 | ― | | 2 | 0 |
| Nottingham Forest | 1948–49 | Second Division | 3 | 0 | 0 | 0 | ― | | 3 | 0 |
| Nottingham Forest | Total | | 5 | 0 | 0 | 0 | ― | | 5 | 0 |
| Peterborough United | 1949–50 | Midland League | 43 | 28 | 2 | 2 | 0 | 0 | 45 | 30 |
| Peterborough United | 1950–51 | Midland League | 42 | 15 | 3 | 1 | 1 (Note: Appearance in Peterborough Hospital Cup) | 1 | 46 | 17 |
| Peterborough United | 1951–52 | Midland League | 36 | 18 | 2 | 1 | 0 | 0 | 38 | 19 |
| Peterborough United | 1952–53 | Midland League | 42 | 26 | 8 | 4 | 4 (Note: 2 appearances in Hunts Premier Cup, 2 appearances in Maunsell Cup) | 0 | 54 | 30 |
| Peterborough United | 1953–54 | Midland League | 46 | 24 | 4 | 3 | 2 (Note: 1 appearance and 2 goals in Northamptonshire Senior Cup, 1 appearance and 2 goals in Maunsell Cup) | 4 | 52 | 31 |
| Peterborough United | 1954–55 | Midland League | 26 | 8 | 1 | 0 | 0 | 0 | 27 | 8 |
| Peterborough United | 1955–56 | Midland League | 3 | 5 | 0 | 0 | 1 (Note: Appearance in Bancroft Cup) | 0 | 4 | 5 |
| Peterborough United | Total | | 238 | 124 | 18 | 11 | 8 | 5 | 264 | 140 |
| Career total | | | 243 | 124 | 18 | 11 | 8 | 5 | 269 | 140 |

== Honours ==
Peterborough United

- Peterborough Hospital Cup: 1949–50
