= Fred Barber =

English footballer

Personal information
- Full name: Frederick Barber
- Date of birth: 26 August 1963 (age 63)
- Place of birth: Ferryhill, England
- Height: 5 ft 10 in (1.78 m)
- Position: Goalkeeper

Youth career
- 1981–1982: Darlington

Senior career*
Years	Team	Apps	(Gls)
1982–1986	Darlington	135	(0)
1986	Everton	0	(0)
1986–1991	Walsall	153	(0)
1989	→ Peterborough United (loan)	6	(0)
1990	→ Chester City (loan)	3	(0)
1990	→ Blackpool (loan)	2	(0)
1991	→ Chester City (loan)	5	(0)
1991–1994	Peterborough United	63	(0)
1993	→ Chesterfield (loan)	0	(0)
1993	→ Colchester United (loan)	10	(0)
1994–1996	Luton Town	0	(0)
1994	→ Peterborough United (loan)	5	(0)
1995	→ Ipswich Town (loan)	1	(0)
1995	→ Blackpool (loan)	1	(0)
1996	Birmingham City	1	(0)
1997–1999	Kidderminster Harriers	21	(0)
Total		406	(0)
- * Club domestic league appearances and goals

Frederick Barber (born 26 August 1963) is an English former footballer who played as a goalkeeper and made nearly 400 Football League appearances. His most successful stints came early in his career with Darlington and Walsall, playing in over 100 league games for each club. He spent over 15 years as goalkeeping coach at Bolton Wanderers, and has been the goalkeeping coach at Crewe Alexandra since 2015.

== Playing career ==
Born in Ferryhill, County Durham, Barber began his career at Darlington in 1981, where he served his apprenticeship. Barber was notable for donning a mask on entering the field for most matches during his career. He made 135 Football League appearances for the club before a £50,000 move to First Division champions Everton in April 1986.

Signed as understudy to Neville Southall, but after six months and no first-team appearances for Everton, Barber was sold to Walsall for £100,000. In his second season with the club, Walsall were promoted to the Second Division, but then suffered successive relegations. Barber was loaned out to Peterborough United during the 1989–90 season, where he made six appearances. He was again loaned out during the 1990–91 season to Chester City on two occasions, in October 1990 and March 1991, accumulating eight appearances, and to Blackpool in November 1990 where he made two appearances. He also made appearances for Walsall during the same campaign, but moved to Peterborough on a permanent basis in the summer of 1991 for a £25,000 fee. Barber totalled 153 games for Walsall between 1986 and 1991.

Barber made his second debut for Peterborough on 17 August 1991, keeping a clean sheet against Preston North End in a 1–0 victory. He helped the club to promotion to the Second Division with a 1992 play-off final victory over Stockport County, but the club struggled in the second tier. Barber found himself out on loan once again at Chesterfield in February 1993, but didn't make an appearance for the club. He was then sent on loan to Colhester United, making his debut on 20 March 1993 in a 2–0 victory for the U's at Brunton Park. He made 10 appearances for Colchester before returning to Peterborough. In the following season, despite Peterborough finishing bottom of the Second Division, Luton Town made a £25,000 offer for Barber, and he transferred in August 1994, ending his Posh stay with 63 appearances in three years.

Just four months had passed before Barber found himself back at London Road with Peterborough. Having made no first-team appearances for Luton, he was sent on loan where he played five league games. After this loan stint, he played one league game first at Ipswich Town in December 1995, and one league game in a return to Blackpool in December 1995. Barber finished his Football League career by joining Birmingham City in 1996, again making just a single appearance. His last club he actively played for was Kidderminster Harriers, where he made 21 Conference appearances before stepping into coaching.

== Coaching career ==
Barber joined the coaching staff at Bolton Wanderers in 1996, serving as part-time goalkeeping coach under Colin Todd before becoming a full-time employee under Todd's successor Sam Allardyce. Barber had also been working at West Bromwich Albion as a coach until this point alongside Bryan Robson, but fully committed himself to Wanderers in 2004.

Barber was instrumental in the development of Finland goalkeeper Jussi Jääskeläinen, who joined the club in 1997, making his international debut in 1998. Barber turned Jääskeläinen into one of the Premier League's most consistent goalkeepers, then helping progress Hungary goalkeeper Ádám Bogdán who would later replace Jääskeläinen upon his exit from Bolton.

In 2007, Barber joined Nigel Worthington as a coach for the Northern Ireland national football team alongside his role at Bolton, where he would spend five years.

Following Bolton's relegation to the Championship in 2012, after 16 years coaching, Barber left the club. This also followed Jääskeläinen's own exit as the club looked to refresh its back-room staff once again. He subsequently joined Bury under Kevin Blackwell on 4 October 2012, before being reunited with Worthington after being appointed assistant manager at League Two club York City on 4 March 2013. He left the club on 5 May 2013, going on to concentrate on his freelance goalkeeper coaching business.

In addition to Bolton, West Brom, Northern Ireland, Bury and York City, as a freelance coach, Barber has previously worked with Oman, Jamaica, Sunderland, Stoke City, Blackpool, Burnley, Bradford City, Stockport County and Rochdale. He also runs his own goalkeeping academy that has helped discover goalkeepers including Jääskeläinen, Bogdán, Ali Al-Habsi and Tomasz Kuszczak.

In January 2015, Barber moved to Crewe Alexandra as the goalkeeping coach, after holding a similar role at Burton Albion. He worked with Will Jääskeläinen, Jussi's son, meaning he worked with two generations of Jääskeläinen goalkeepers.

On 5 August 2015 he moved from Crewe to Blackpool to replace Bobby Mimms, but had a change of heart two days later and returned to Crewe.

== Personal life ==
His son, Jonathan, also played as a goalkeeper for Bury and Hartlepool United, and is currently the goalkeeper coach for MLS side Minnesota United.

== Honours ==
Walsall

- Football League Third Division play-offs: 1988

Peterborough United

- Football League Third Division play-offs: 1992
