= Worrell Sterling =

English footballer

Personal information
- Full name: Worrell Ricardo Sterling
- Date of birth: 8 June 1965 (age 61)
- Place of birth: Bethnal Green, England
- Height: 5 ft 8 in (1.73 m)
- Position: Winger

Senior career*
Years	Team	Apps	(Gls)
1983–1989	Watford	94	(14)
1989–1993	Peterborough United	193	(29)
1993–1996	Bristol Rovers	119	(6)
1996–1997	Lincoln City	19	(0)
Total		425	(49)
- * Club domestic league appearances and goals

Worrell Ricardo Sterling (born 8 June 1965) is an English former professional footballer who played as a winger.

Sterling began his career as a trainee with Watford, before signing as a professional with them in 1983. He went on to play for Peterborough United, Bristol Rovers and Lincoln City before ending his league career in 1997, completing, in total, more than 400 league appearances.

== Honours ==
Peterborough United

- Football League Third Division play-offs: 1992
