= Gary Cooper (footballer, born 1965) =

English footballer

Personal information
- Full name: Gary Cooper
- Date of birth: 20 November 1965 (age 60)
- Place of birth: London, England
- Height: 5 ft 8 in (1.73 m)
- Positions: Midfielder; defender

Youth career
- –: Queens Park Rangers

Senior career*
Years	Team	Apps	(Gls)
1983–1986	Queens Park Rangers	1	(0)
1985	→ Brentford (loan)	10	(0)
1986–1989	Fisher Athletic	48	(3)
1989–1991	Maidstone United	60	(7)
1991–1993	Peterborough United	90	(10)
1993–1996	Birmingham City	62	(2)
1996–1997	Welling United	30	(1)

International career
1983–1984	England youth	10	(1)
1985	England U19	2	(0)
- * Club domestic league appearances and goals

Gary Cooper (born 20 November 1965) is an English former professional footballer born in Hammersmith, London, who played as a midfielder or defender. He made more than 200 appearances in the Football League playing for Queens Park Rangers, Brentford, Maidstone United, Peterborough United and Birmingham City. Cooper played for England at youth level.

== Honours ==
Fisher Athletic

- Southern Football League Premier Division: 1986–87

Birmingham City

- Football League Second Division: 1994–95
- Football League Trophy: 1994–95
