= Darren Bradshaw (English footballer) =

English footballer

Personal information
- Full name: Darren Shaun Bradshaw
- Date of birth: 19 March 1967 (age 59)
- Place of birth: Sheffield, England
- Height: 5 ft 11 in (1.80 m)
- Positions: Defender; midfielder

Youth career
- Sheffield Wednesday

Senior career*
Years	Team	Apps	(Gls)
1986–1987	Matlock Town		
1987	→ Chesterfield (loan)	18	(0)
1987–1989	York City	59	(3)
1989–1992	Newcastle United	38	(0)
1992–1994	Peterborough United	73	(1)
1994	→ Plymouth Argyle (loan)	6	(1)
1994–1997	Blackpool	68	(1)
1997–2001	Rushden & Diamonds	78	(0)
2001	Stevenage Borough	7	(0)
2001–20??	Worksop		
2004–2005	Belper Town		
Total		347	(6)

International career
1984	England Youth		
- * Club domestic league appearances and goals

Darren Shaun Bradshaw (born 19 March 1967) is an English former professional footballer. He primarily played as a centre-back but was versatile enough to also operate in midfield. His playing career spanned fifteen years, during which he made over 200 Football League appearances.

== Career ==
While with Sheffield Wednesday, one of his hometown clubs, Bradshaw was capped by the England national youth team in 1984. He began his senior career in non-League football with Matlock Town in 1986. He was loaned the following year to Chesterfield, marking his entry into the professional game.

He signed for York City on a free transfer in 1987, and went on to make 59 league appearances for the Minstermen in two years, scoring three goals.

In 1989, Jim Smith signed Bradshaw to Newcastle United. In three years at St James' Park, he made 38 appearances.

Peterborough United was his next stop, in 1992. He made 73 appearances for the Posh, finding the net on a single occasion. In his second and final year at London Road, he was loaned out to Plymouth Argyle.

In 1994, Bradshaw joined Sam Allardyce's Blackpool for a fee of £35,000. In three years at Bloomfield Road, he made 68 appearances, again finding the net just once.

Approaching the age of 30, Bradshaw decided to move back into the non-league game. He joined Rushden & Diamonds in 1997. He also went on to play for Stevenage Borough, Worksop Town and Belper Town before retiring in 2005 at the age of 38.
