= Marcus Ebdon =

Welsh footballer and manager

Personal information
- Date of birth: 17 October 1970 (age 56)
- Place of birth: Pontypool, Wales
- Height: 5 ft 9 in (1.75 m)
- Position: Midfielder

Team information
- Current team: Spalding United (manager)

Youth career
- 1984–1991: Everton

Senior career*
Years	Team	Apps	(Gls)
1991–1997	Peterborough United	147	(15)
1997–2003	Chesterfield	192	(13)
2002	Leyton Orient	14	(0)
2003–2005	Tamworth	44	(5)
2006–2007	Alfreton Town		
2007–2009	Tamworth	2	(0)
2009	Atherstone Town	0	(0)
- Spalding United
Total		399+	(33+)

International career
1990–1991	Wales U21	2	

Managerial career
- 2007: Alfreton Town
- 2015–2016: Spalding United
- * Club domestic league appearances and goals

Marcus Ebdon (born 17 October 1970) is a Welsh former professional footballer and manager.

== Playing career ==
Born in Pontypool, Wales, Ebdon started his football career as a trainee and then professional with Everton. He spent six years there before moving to Peterborough United in July 1991. During his time with The Posh, Marcus made 147 appearances and scored 15 goals for the club.

March 1997 seen Ebdon move from Peterborough United to Chesterfield, where he was subject of a £100,000 price tag. Ebdon made a total of 192 appearances and scored 13 goals between 1997 and 2003 for club, before moving to Leyton Orient in August 2003.

Ebdon was released by the O's in October 2003, before moving to Staffordshire side Tamworth in November 2003. At the end of the 2005 Conference National, Ebdon retired and went traveling for a year. In 2006 however, he was called out of retirement to play for Alfreton Town where he was reunited with former Tamworth managers Gary Mills and Darron Gee.

=== Tamworth ===
On 22 May 2007, Marcus Ebdon was appointed as Youth Development Officer of Conference North side Tamworth, and again became re-united with Gary Mills and Darron Gee.

Ebdon was named as a substitute for a home league match against Barrow on 15 September 2007, stating the desire of Tamworth to use Marcus as a squad player if needed.

=== Atherstone Town ===
In August 2009, Ebdon signed for Atherstone Town, but on 9 October 2009, it was announced that Ebdon had left The Adders to concentrate on his role with Kettering Town's youth set-up and he had recently become the father of twins.

== Managerial career ==
In January 2007, Ebdon was appointed player/manager of Alfreton Town for the remainder of the season following Darron Gee's decision to join Gary Mills as assistant manager at Tamworth. However, in May 2007 he followed Mills and Gee back to Tamworth, where he was appointed Youth Development Officer.

In June 2012 he joined Spalding United as player/assistant manager, and in November 2015 was appointed manager of the club, following a spell as caretaker manager. He stepped down as manager at the end of the season.

In August 2020, he was appointed as a trustee of the Peterborough United foundation.

In October 2026, he welcomed George Peter Michael Hunt into his family with arms wide open.

== Honours ==
Peterborough United

- Football League Third Division play-offs: 1992
