= Steve Welsh =

Scottish football player and manager (born 1968)

Personal information
- Full name: Stephen George Welsh
- Date of birth: 19 April 1968 (age 58)
- Place of birth: Glasgow, Scotland
- Height: 6 ft 0 in (1.83 m)
- Position: Defender

Senior career*
Years	Team	Apps	(Gls)
1989–1990	Wimborne Town		
1990–1991	Cambridge United	1	(0)
1991–1994	Peterborough United	146	(2)
1994	→ Preston North End (loan)	0	(0)
1994–1996	Partick Thistle	55	(0)
1996	Peterborough United	6	(0)
1996–1998	Dunfermline Athletic	17	(0)
1998–1999	Ayr United	24	(0)
1999–2001	Lincoln City	43	(0)
2001–2002	King's Lynn		

Managerial career
- 2004–2005: Spalding United
- 2008–2009: Boston United
- * Club domestic league appearances and goals

Stephen George Welsh (born 19 April 1968) is a Scottish former professional footballer and Head of Coaching within the academy at Lincoln City.

As a player Welsh was a defender from 1989 to 2002. He moved into coaching in 2005 with Boston United where he later took the step up to become manager between 2008 and 2009 before being sacked. He was re-hired by Boston in 2011 as the club's Head of Youth.

== Early life ==
Welsh was born in Glasgow and served in the British army before embarking on his football career.

== Career ==
=== Playing career ===
In a career spanning thirteen seasons, Welsh played as a central defender for Wimborne Town, Cambridge United, Peterborough United, Preston North End, Partick Thistle, Dunfermline Athletic, Ayr United, Lincoln City and finally King's Lynn.

=== Coaching career ===
In February 2001, Welsh was appointed Football in the Community Officer at Lincoln City, with the role commencing at the beginning of the 2001–2002 season and meaning an end to his professional career. Welsh also became manager of the club's under-16 Centre of Excellence side. In December 2004, Welsh was appointed manager of Spalding United and announced that, where necessary, he would also make a playing return.

Steve joined Boston United in October 2005 as first team coach. After Neil Richardson left the club he also took on the role of Head of Youth, which involved work with the club's Centre of Excellence and the Bedford College Educational Scheme. He stayed at the club during four months without pay when the club hit a financial crisis in early 2007. On 18 November 2008 Tommy Taylor left Boston by mutual consent and Welsh was appointed caretaker manager. He was appointed permanent first team manager the following month after a satisfactory spell of results. Speaking of Welsh's appointment Boston United chairman David Newton said: "Steve ticked all the boxes with the exception of actual management experience. He now has the rest of the season to move from coach to manager, a step that we believe he can take, and we will be supporting him all the way."

Former Brentford and Boston United midfielder Stewart Talbot said it was the, 'right appointment at the right time'. Welsh fell ill over the New Year (08/09) and doctors advised him to stay at home and rest. As a result, he missed one game at home to Nantwich. Welsh picked the starting line-up but Talbot took charge of the match and United lost 5–0. Welsh appointed Andrew Stanhope as his assistant manager in early 2009 but was sacked later that year. He was re-appointed to the club in 2011 as the Head of Youth.

== Honours ==
Peterborough United

- Football League Third Division play-offs: 1992
