= Lil Fuccillo =

English footballer & manager (born 1956)

Personal information
- Full name: Pasquale Fuccillo
- Date of birth: 2 June 1956 (age 70)
- Place of birth: Bedford, England
- Height: 5 ft 11 in (1.80 m)
- Position: Midfielder

Senior career*
Years	Team	Apps	(Gls)
1974–1983	Luton Town	160	(24)
1983	Tulsa Roughnecks	19	(0)
1983–1985	Southend United	45	(4)
1985–1987	Peterborough United	82	(3)
1987	Valletta		
1987–1988	Cambridge United	19	(2)
1988	Kettering Town		
1988–1991	Wivenhoe Town	83	(19)
Total		325	(33)

Managerial career
- 1986: Peterborough United (caretaker manager)
- 1992–1993: Peterborough United
- 2000–2001: Luton Town
- * Club domestic league appearances and goals

Pasquale "Lil" Fuccillo (born 2 May 1956) is a former footballer and football manager. He is the chief scout at Crawley Town.

== Biography ==
=== Playing career ===
Fuccillo was born in Bedford to Italian parents and joined Luton Town from school. He established himself in their starting line-up, and there was even talk of a call-up to the Italy national team. Disaster struck, however, when a tackle by Brighton and Hove Albion's Paul Clark shattered his leg. He broke his leg for a second time during his comeback match for the Luton youth team. He did manage, eventually, to regain his place in the team and played an important part as they won Second Division in 1982.

In 1983 Fuccillo left Luton following a contractual dispute and played 19 games for the Tulsa Roughnecks in the North American Soccer League.

Fuccillo then joined Southend United, before John Wile brought him to Peterborough United. He helped Posh get to the 5th round of the FA Cup in 1985/86, had a brief spell as caretaker manager in 1986/87 prior to Noel Cantwell's return to the club, but was released during the summer of 1987.

He played briefly for Malta side Valletta before short spells at Cambridge United and Kettering Town. He finished his playing career at Isthmian League side Wivenhoe Town.

=== Coaching career ===
Chris Turner brought him back to Peterborough United in 1991 as his assistant manager, and had an unsuccessful spell as manager when Turner became chairman. He joined Barry Fry at Birmingham City as coach, and then moved back to Peterborough United to be his assistant. His third spell at Peterborough United did not last long, however, as Fry sacked both Fuccillo and coach Mick Halsall in December 1996 as an economy measure.

Fuccillo had spells as a scout for Sheffield Wednesday and as John Still's right-hand man at Barnet, but in November 2000 he returned to Luton Town as a scout. A week later he was promoted to assistant manager, but, with the club at the foot of the league, Ricky Hill was sacked within weeks so Fuccillo then stepped up into the managerial seat. Following an unsuccessful reign, Joe Kinnear was brought to the club in February as Director of Football, but took it upon himself to replace Fuccillo as manager as well. Surprisingly, Fuccillo remained at Luton Town as a coach until the end of the season. Their third manager of the season, however, was unable to save the club and Luton were relegated to the basement division for the first time since 1968.

During the summer of 2001 he joined United Counties League side Wootton Blue Cross as a coach for John Taylor, making an immediate impact with the team starting with a ten-match winning sequence. After a season Fuccillo linked up with Peterborough United for a fourth time as a scout, but again this spell did not last long as he moved to perform a similar role with Premiership side Everton, combined at the start with some part-time coaching at Taylor's new club St Neots Town. He was reunited once more with Taylor as he began the 2006–07 season as a coach at Isthmian League side Arlesey Town, but in November 2006 joined Leicester City as chief scout.

On 21 March 2008, Lil Fucillo was appointed chief scout for Newcastle United. On 3 September 2009 he left Newcastle United to take up a similar position at Championship rivals Swansea City.

On 23 March 2012 Luton Town announced that Fuccillo had returned to the club in the role of Technical Director, which he held until his departure in April 2013.

Fuccillo was appointed as chief scout at League One side Crawley Town on 6 February 2014.

Fuccillo is currently a scout at Championship side Bristol City.
