= Bobby Barnes =

English footballer (born 1962)

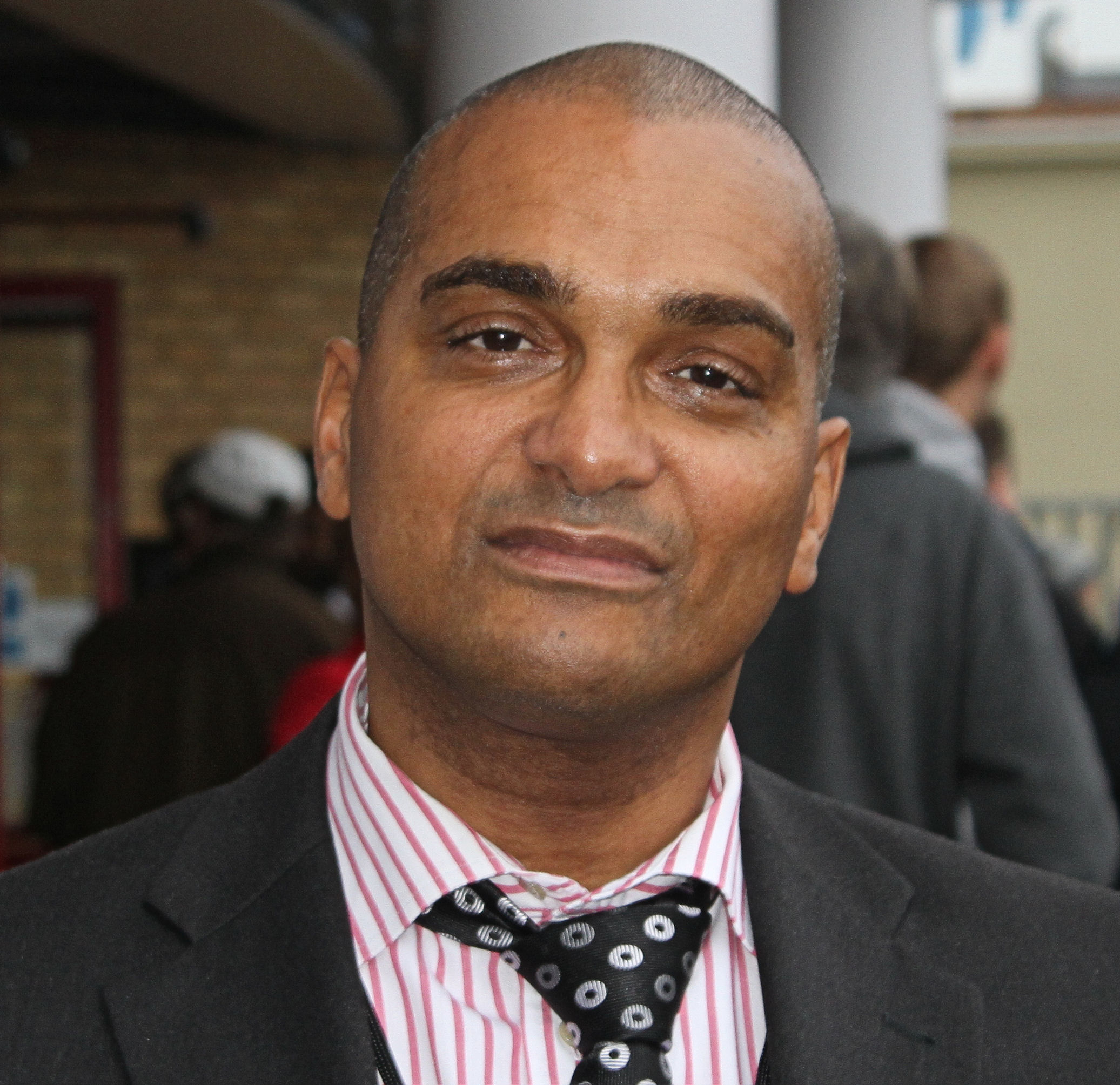
- Barnes in 2010

Personal information
- Full name: David Oswald Barnes
- Date of birth: 17 December 1962 (age 63)
- Place of birth: Kingston upon Thames, England
- Height: 5 ft 7 in (1.70 m)
- Positions: Striker; winger

Senior career*
Years	Team	Apps	(Gls)
1980–1986	West Ham United	43	(5)
1985	→ Scunthorpe United (loan)	6	(0)
1986–1987	Aldershot	49	(26)
1987–1989	Swindon Town	44	(13)
1989	AFC Bournemouth	14	(0)
1989–1992	Northampton Town	98	(37)
1992–1994	Peterborough United	49	(9)
1994	Partick Thistle	7	(0)
1994	Kettering Town	9	(0)
1994–1995	Hong Kong Rangers		
1995	Torquay United	1	(0)
1995–1996	Frankwell	5	(1)
1996	Hendon	2	(0)
Total		327	(91)

International career
1980–1981	England Youth	7	(2)
- * Club domestic league appearances and goals

David Oswald "Bobby" Barnes (born 17 December 1962) is an English former professional footballer who played as a forward. He made over 300 appearances in the Football League and represented England at youth level.

== Career ==
Barnes, who was born in Kingston upon Thames, London, was a quick, skillful winger who began his career as an apprentice with West Ham United, the team that he supported as a boy, winning an FA Youth Cup winners medal in 1981 and England youth international caps. He turned professional in September 1980, and scored on his League debut against Watford in September 1980. He had an extended run in the first-team in the 1983–84 season and featured in the 1984–85 season, making 43 league appearances in six seasons, scoring five goals. He went to Scunthorpe United on loan in November 1985, playing in six league games without scoring, before joining Aldershot in March 1986 for a fee of £15,000. He was an immediate success, scoring 26 goals in 49 league games and helping Aldershot to promotion through the first ever Third Division play-offs in 1987.

In October 1987, he moved to Second Division side Swindon Town for a fee of £50,000 in a deal that also saw Steve Berry go in the other direction. He scored in six successive league games between October and December 1988, and went on to make over 40 league appearances, scoring 13 times, in two seasons at Swindon. He joined AFC Bournemouth for a fee of £110,000 in March 1989, though he failed to settle and after only 14 games in which he failed to score, was sold to Northampton Town for £70,000. Barnes managed to star despite Northampton being relegated, and with Tony Adcock formed a successful striking partnership, Barnes scoring 37 times in 98 league games for the Cobblers. In February 1992, a financial crisis came to a head at Northampton, and with the club in administration, both Barnes and Adcock were sold to Peterborough United, Barnes costing only £35,000 in a joint £65,000 deal. He played 49 times in the league for Peterborough, scoring nine goals and winning promotion to the First Division beating Stockport in a Wembley play-off in 1992.

He joined Partick Thistle in February 1994, making his debut in the Scottish League in a 5–1 defeat by Rangers at Ibrox, but played only 6 further league games for the Jags before leaving to play for Uhisport Rangers in Hong Kong, returning to the UK in September 1995 joining Torquay United on a free transfer. He played only once for Torquay, as a substitute, before leaving on a free transfer for Hendon in October 1995 and subsequently returning to Hong Kong to play for Frankwell FC.

== After retirement ==
After retiring in 1996, he joined the Professional Footballers' Association (PFA), where he dealt with player's new contracts and giving financial advice. Since 2006, he has been deputy chief executive of the PFA. Barnes is also president of FIFPro Division Europe and a global board member of FIFPro, which is the global players' union representing players from over 58 countries. Since June 2020, Barnes has been a member of UEFA's Control, Ethics and Disciplinary Body.

In April 2022, it was announced Barnes would retire from his role with the Professional Footballers' Association at the end of the 2021/2022 season.

== Personal life ==
His nephew Giles Barnes was a professional footballer.

== Honours ==
Aldershot

- Football League Fourth Division play-offs: 1987

Peterborough United

- Football League Third Division play-offs: 1992
