= Chris Greenman =

English footballer (born 1968)

Personal information
- Full name: Christopher William Edwin Greenman
- Date of birth: 22 December 1968 (age 57)
- Place of birth: Bristol, England
- Position: Defender

Senior career*
Years	Team	Apps	(Gls)
1991–1993	Coventry City	6	(0)
1993–1999	Peterborough United	162	(19)
- Bromsgrove Rovers
2004-2008	Worcester City		
- * Club domestic league appearances and goals

Chris Greenman (born 22 December 1968) is an English retired footballer who played as a defender.
