= Tony Philliskirk =

English footballer

Personal information
- Full name: Anthony Philliskirk
- Date of birth: 10 February 1965 (age 61)
- Place of birth: Sunderland, England
- Height: 6 ft 1 in (1.85 m)
- Position: Striker

Senior career*
Years	Team	Apps	(Gls)
1983–1988	Sheffield United	80	(20)
1986	→ Rotherham United (loan)	6	(1)
1988–1989	Oldham Athletic	10	(1)
1989	Preston North End	14	(6)
1989–1992	Bolton Wanderers	141	(51)
1992–1994	Peterborough United	43	(15)
1994–1995	Burnley	40	(9)
1995	→ Carlisle United (loan)	3	(1)
1995–1998	Cardiff City	61	(5)
1997–1998	→ Halifax Town (loan)	2	(3)
1998	→ Macclesfield Town (loan)	10	(1)
1998	Oldham Athletic	0	(0)
Total		410	(113)

Managerial career
- 2005: Oldham Athletic (caretaker)
- 2013: Oldham Athletic (caretaker)
- * Club domestic league appearances and goals

Anthony Philliskirk (born 10 February 1965) is an English former footballer. He played as a striker for 11 different clubs between 1983 and 1998.

== Playing career ==
Philliskirk turned professional at the age of 18, when he joined Sheffield United. He made his debut for the Blades in a pre-season friendly against Mansfield Town at Field Mill on 17 August 1983. He had to wait until 18 October 1983, before making his league debut for Sheffield United against Brentford at Griffin Park.

He scored his first goal for the club two weeks later at Plymouth Argyle. He scored eight goals in his first season with Sheffield United. Most of his time at Bramall Lane was spent as a partner of striker Keith Edwards.

He was part of the Sheffield United side which won promotion from the Third Division in season 1983–84. In total he made 80 league appearances (18 as a substitute) for Sheffield United scoring 20 goals.

After five years at Bramall Lane, he had brief spells with Oldham Athletic and Preston North End before joining Bolton Wanderers in the June 1989 for a fee of £50,000. He made his debut for Bolton on 19 August 1989 in a Third Division match against Cardiff City at Ninian Park, and he soon formed an effective striking partnership with David Reeves.

Philliskirk moved on to Peterborough United in October 1992, and then had spells with Burnley, Cardiff City, Halifax Town and Macclesfield Town before hanging up his boots in 1998

For some reason in the PC game Premier Manager 97, his speed was set at 255 when normally the maximum was 99.

== Refereeing career ==
He also spent a couple of years as a referee towards the end of his playing days. Philliskirk was one of 15 players who accepted a training offer in 1996 as part of a PFA scheme to encourage more former professionals to take up the whistle. He progressed as far as the Northern Premier League.

== Coaching career ==
In 1998, team manager Andy Ritchie offered him the youth coaching job at Oldham Athletic.

He became assistant manager at Oldham Athletic until December 2003, when his team manager Iain Dowie was tempted away by Crystal Palace. Dowie wanted to take his assistant with him, but Philliskirk turned down the offer for personal reasons.

During the 2004–05 season, Philliskirk was manager for one game but lost 2–1 to Huddersfield Town. He stayed at Boundary Park, where he is now Oldham's youth coach, a role he initially filled for four years before becoming Dowie's assistant in 2002.

Following the resignation of Paul Dickov at Oldham Athletic on 3 February 2013 Philliskirk was put in charge of the club once again on a temporary basis.

He was suspended from his role as academy manager in April 2018. In October 2018, it was announced that Pete Wild had taken over the role on an interim basis.

In December 2018, Philliskirk returned to Burnley FC where we had a short spell as player in the 1990s and was appointed the new head coach of the U18s team

== Personal life ==
Philliskirk's son Danny is also a professional footballer, who plays for AFC Fylde, after previously playing for Sheffield United, Blackpool, and Oldham Athletic his father's former clubs.

== Honours ==
Individual

- PFA Team of the Year: 1990–91 Third Division
