= Chris Turner (footballer, born 1951) =

English footballer and manager

Personal information
- Full name: Christopher James Turner
- Date of birth: 3 April 1951
- Place of birth: St Neots, England
- Date of death: 27 April 2015 (aged 64)
- Place of death: Wisbech, England
- Height: 6 ft 1 in (1.85 m)
- Position: Defender

Senior career*
Years	Team	Apps	(Gls)
1969–1978	Peterborough United	314	(37)
1977	Connecticut Bicentennials (loan)	20	(3)
1978	New England Tea Men	26	(2)
1978–1979	Luton Town	30	(5)
1979	New England Tea Men	29	(2)
1979–1980	Cambridge United	19	(0)
1980	New England Tea Men	30	(5)
1980	Swindon Town	3	(0)
1980–1983	Cambridge United	71	(3)
1983–1984	Southend United	22	(2)

Managerial career
- 1985–1990: Cambridge United
- 1991–1992: Peterborough United
- 1993–1994: Peterborough United (caretaker)
- * Club domestic league appearances and goals

Christopher James Turner (3 April 1951 – 27 April 2015) was an English professional footballer and manager, best known for a nine-year association as a player with Peterborough United.

== Playing career ==
Turner began his playing career with Peterborough United in 1969. He went on to make 314 league appearances as a defender, scoring 37 goals. 1977 saw him spend a loan spell in the US with the Connecticut Bicentennials, an experience he enjoyed so much that he moved permanently to the New England Tea Men a year later. He returned to England to join Luton Town the same year, and although he did well during his season in Bedfordshire, he moved back to New England at the end of the season. At the end of the American season, he switched again, this time to join Cambridge United.

Turner played for one season at Cambridge, playing 19 times before leaving the country to play in the American Soccer League once again with New England. After returning to England he joined up with Swindon Town for a brief spell before returning to Cambridge. Turner ended a 15-year playing career with a spell at Southend United before retiring in 1984.

== Coaching career ==
In December 1985, Cambridge United had sacked their manager Ken Shellito and were looking for a new appointment. Turner was appointed as his replacement. He managed Cambridge until January 1990, stabilising a club that was at rock bottom and turning them slowly into promotion candidates. He built much of the squad that he would later hand over to John Beck to take the team up from the Fourth Division to Second Division.

He took on his next managerial position at his first club, Peterborough United, in January 1991 and managed the club until December 1992, going on to be one of the most successful managers in the club's history. He retired from football in 1992 and went on to own the club as chairman before selling his interest to Barry Fry in 1996.

In 2006, Turner teamed up with ex-Peterborough player Lee Power, who was then chairman of Cambridge United, to help out in a temporary coaching role at the club. But soon afterwards he became ill with what was later diagnosed as frontal lobe dementia, and by April 2014 he was living in a nursing home. In the last five years of his life, Turner was reportedly unable to walk, talk or eat solid foods. He died on 27 April 2015, aged 64 years old.

== Honours ==
Peterborough United

- Football League Third Division play-offs: 1992
