= Dominic Iorfa (footballer, born 1968) =

Nigerian footballer

Personal information
- Full name: Dominic Iorfa
- Date of birth: 1 October 1968 (age 58)
- Place of birth: Gboko, Benue State, Nigeria
- Height: 1.83 m (6 ft 0 in)
- Position: Striker

Senior career*
Years	Team	Apps	(Gls)
1984–1986	BCC Lions		
1986–1987	Abiola Babes		
1987–1989	Ranchers Bees		
1989–1990	Royal Antwerp	4	(0)
1990–1991	Queens Park Rangers	8	(0)
1991–1992	Galatasaray	7	(2)
1992–1994	Peterborough United	60	(9)
1994–1996	Southend	10	(1)
1996	Falkirk	4	(1)
1996–1997	Instant-Dict FC		(3)
1997	Guangzhou Apollo	15	(1)
1998	Hong Kong Rangers		(3)
1998	Cork City	0	(0)
1998	St Albans City	2	(0)
1998	Dover Athletic	3	(1)
1998	Gravesend & Northfleet United	6	(3)
1998	→ Aylesbury United (loan)	2	(2)
1998	Billericay Town	3	(1)
1999	Southend United	2	(0)
1999	Waterford United	24	(5)
2000	Hong Kong Rangers	6	(1)
2000	Lobi Stars		

International career
1988	Nigeria U23	2	(0)
1989–1995	Nigeria	4	(0)
- * Club domestic league appearances and goals

Dominic Iorfa (or Dominic Jorfa, born 1 October 1968) is a Nigerian former professional footballer who played as a striker.

== Club career ==
Iorfa played professionally in England, Scotland, Turkey, Ireland and Belgium. Renowned for his electric pace but less than stunning control, he became a cult figure at many of the clubs played for, particularly at Peterborough United where his name is still occasionally shouted during dull periods of matches.

He signed for Queens Park Rangers in March 1990 for a transfer fee of £145,000 from Royal Antwerp. Whilst only playing 8 first team games for Rangers he certainly earned the affection of many of the Rangers fans, despite regularly featuring in recent years in lists of "Worst ever Rangers Players". His career at Rangers started brightly with him scoring a hat-trick on his debut for the reserves v Reading on 3 April 1990 in a 3–2 home win. A few weeks earlier he had scored another hat-trick in a reserve game on 13 February 1990 whilst on trial with Millwall versus Queens Park Rangers in a 4–3 victory for Millwall. This performance influenced Rangers to sign him. He made his first team debut coming on as substitute in the last match of the season in the 2–3 home defeat against Wimbledon on 5 May 1990. Dominic was lightning fast but he struggled to master the off side rule and eventually faded out of contention at Rangers with his last first team game being away to Tottenham Hotspur in a 2–0 defeat on 14 September 1991.

On his debut for Aylesbury United he scored 2 goals, wearing his yellow "banana" boots. In his next game he was about to enter the field of play as a substitute when he had an altercation with the linesman and was given a red card. He never played for Aylesbury again.

He enjoyed a successful spell in the League of Ireland Premier Division with Waterford United and was adored by the fans, despite missing a penalty on his debut. To this day, his yellow Puma boots are still worn by the clubs kitman who received the boots off Iorfa shortly before he left the club.

Currently he is a member of the board of the NFA and the Chairman of Lobi Stars F.C.

== International career ==
Iorfa represented Nigeria on four occasions, including a starting place in the third-place playoff match against Mexico at the 1995 King Fahd Cup. He had previously featured in the 1988 Summer Olympics while playing twice for the Nigeria under-23 team.

== Personal life ==
Dominic Iorfa was born in Gboko, Benue State.

His son, also named Dominic Iorfa, plays as a defender for Sheffield Wednesday; he has represented England at under-21, under-20 and under-18 levels.
