= Ken Charlery =

Saint Lucian footballer

Personal information
- Full name: Kenneth Leroy Charlery
- Date of birth: 28 November 1964 (age 61)
- Place of birth: Stepney, England
- Height: 1.82 m (5 ft 11 1/2 in)
- Position: Forward

Team information
- Current team: London Colney (owner)

Senior career*
Years	Team	Apps	(Gls)
1983–1987	Basildon United		
1987–1988	Billericay Town		
1988–1989	Fisher Athletic	37	(23)
1989–1991	Maidstone United	70	(16)
1991–1992	Peterborough United	51	(19)
1992–1993	Watford	48	(13)
1993–1995	Peterborough United	70	(24)
1995–1996	Birmingham City	17	(4)
1996	→ Southend United (loan)	3	(0)
1996–1997	Peterborough United	56	(12)
1997	Stockport County	10	(0)
1997–2000	Barnet	124	(38)
2000–2001	Boston United	42	(21)
2001–2002	Dagenham & Redbridge	23	(9)
2002–2004	Farnborough Town	59	(15)
2004	Waltham Forest	1	(1)
2004–2005	Harrow Borough	5	(0)
Total		568	(167)

International career
	Saint Lucia	4	(?)
- England Semi-Pro

Managerial career
- 2004–2005: Harrow Borough (assistant)
- 2005–2006: Peterborough United (assistant)
- 2006–2011: Harrow Borough (assistant)
- 2011–2012: St Albans City (assistant)
- 2015–2017: Ware
- 2017–2021: London Colney
- * Club domestic league appearances and goals

Kenneth Leroy Charlery (born 28 November 1964) is a former St Lucian international footballer, who has played club football in England with Birmingham City and for Basildon United, Watford, Peterborough United, Boston United and Barnet, among others.

== Playing career ==
Charlery obtained legendary status in his first spell at Peterborough United by scoring two goals in the 1992 3rd Division Play Off Final including an 89th-minute winner. Ken left Posh in the 1992–93 season to sign for Watford but returned the following year for a second spell at the club but was unable to save them from relegation to the old Second Division. He was named as captain by new Posh manager, John Still for the 1994–95 season; he was voted player of the year, the second time he'd received the accolade. He moved to Birmingham in 1995 but was back for a third spell with Posh in 1996. In the 1996–97 season he endured a run of 24 scoreless games, which saw him depart for the final time. He is still known affectionately as King Kenny at London Road.

== Coaching career ==
He was working as Assistant Manager at Harrow Borough, before joining Peterborough United as an assistant coach to help Andy Legg and Barry Fry with coaching responsibilities until the end of the 2005–06 season.

Charlery returned to Harrow Borough, where as assistant manager, he helped them gain a place in the play-offs of the Isthmian League Premier Division in 2010–11. In the summer of 2011 he moved to St Albans City to be assistant manager under David Howell.

In November 2015, Charlery was appointed manager of Ware. After being dismissed in January 2017 despite the club being in a respectable mid table position he became the owner of London Colney as well as being becoming first team manager. He resigned as manager in March 2021.

== Honours ==
=== As a player ===
Peterborough United

- Football League Third Division play-offs: 1992

Stockport County

- Football League Second Division second-place promotion: 1996–97

Boston United

- Football Conference: 2001–02

Individual

- Peterborough United Player of the Year: 1991–92, 1994–95
- Peterborough United Hall of Fame
