= Mick Halsall =

English footballer (born 1961)

Personal information
- Full name: Michael Halsall
- Date of birth: 21 July 1961 (age 65)
- Place of birth: Bootle, England
- Height: 5 ft 10 in (1.78 m)
- Position: Midfielder

Youth career
- 1977–1979: Liverpool

Senior career*
Years	Team	Apps	(Gls)
1979–1983	Liverpool	0	(0)
1983–1984	Birmingham City	36	(3)
1984–1987	Carlisle United	92	(11)
1987	Grimsby Town	12	(0)
1987–1993	Peterborough United	249	(28)
1996	Finn Harps	1	(0)

Managerial career
- 1995–1996: Peterborough United
- 2006: Walsall (caretaker)
- 2014: Notts County (caretaker)
- 2015–2016: Notts County (caretaker)
- * Club domestic league appearances and goals

Michael Halsall (born 21 July 1961) is an English former professional footballer who played as a midfielder. He scored 42 goals in 389 appearances in the Football League, playing for Birmingham City, Carlisle United, Grimsby Town and Peterborough United.

He has also worked as a manager with Peterborough United and as caretaker manager at Walsall and at Wolverhampton Wanderers youth academy, as of 2014 as professional lead coach.

In August 2014 he joined Notts County, and has had two spells there as caretaker manager.

== Playing career ==
Halsall was born in Bootle, Merseyside. He began his football career as an apprentice with Liverpool in 1977 and turned professional in 1979, but in six years with the club he never played for the first team. He moved on to Birmingham City, and went straight into the starting eleven for the First Division game away to West Bromwich Albion on 19 March 1983. Birmingham lost that game 2–0, but Halsall played in all but one of the remaining games of the 1982–83 season, in which the team won five of the last six games to avoid relegation, and scored his first goal for Birmingham in the penultimate game against Tottenham Hotspur. Halsall began the following season as a first-team regular, but despite demonstrating his enthusiasm and capacity for hard work, he gradually lost his hold on a starting place. He was sent off in his last appearance for the club, in a League Cup tie in October 1984, and was promptly sold to Carlisle United for a fee of £5,000.

When Halsall joined Carlisle, they were in the Second Division; by the time he left for Grimsby Town two and a half years later, for a fee of £10,000, they were well on the way to the Fourth. Grimsby sold Halsall on to Peterborough United for a fee of £25,000 during the 1987 close season.

Halsall spent six seasons as a player with Peterborough, and played 249 league games. He captained the club to promotion from the Fourth Division in the 1990–91 season, to a run of nine consecutive wins the following season which contributed to their reaching sixth place in the Third Division, qualifying for the play-offs, and winning promotion to the second tier of English football for the first time in the club's history. The Peterborough Evening Telegraph's "A to Z of Posh" feature summed him up as follows:

Have Posh ever had a better captain than Mick HALSALL? It's doubtful as his tireless, passionate performances made him a club legend even before he lifted the Division Three Play-off trophy at Wembley in 1992.

== Coaching career ==
In his last season as a Peterborough player he became involved on the coaching side, and in January 1994 he was appointed assistant manager to Chris Turner after the departure of Lil Fuccillo. He then worked under John Still before being appointed manager in October 1995 after Still's departure. Halsall reverted to coaching when Barry Fry took over the club in June 1996, only to be sacked as an economy measure a few months later.

In November 1996, shortly after leaving Peterborough, Halsall made one playing appearance for Finn Harps in a League of Ireland match at Derry City.

Halsall worked for a private football academy and as assistant to John Still at Barnet before joining the coaching staff at Walsall in the 1998–99 season. His main concern was with youth development, though as time went on he had more involvement with the first team, until in October 2002 he was appointed first team coach by manager Colin Lee. In March 2004, the appointment of Paul Bracewell as assistant manager allowed Halsall to return to the post of Head of Youth Development. After Lee's departure soon afterwards, Halsall offered assistance to player-manager Paul Merson, but was unwilling to accept the role of first-team coach. When Merson left in early 2006, Halsall acted as caretaker manager for three matches, but refused any more permanent tenure.

Halsall earned himself an excellent reputation in bringing young players through to first-team level, and in January 2009 he was approached by Premier League club Stoke City to manage their youth academy. Walsall's chairman refused to accept Halsall's resignation, but said he would not stand in his way provided that Stoke paid adequate compensation for the loss of his services. Halsall decided to stay at Walsall.

He joined Midlands neighbours Wolverhampton Wanderers in July 2009 as assistant academy manager and under-18's coach where he loved to run them. After a spell as reserve-team coach in 2012, as of 2014 Halsall is professional lead coach at the academy.

On 8 August 2014, Halsall was appointed Notts County Head of Academy Coaching.

On 18 September 2015, he was appointed as the club's new Academy Manager.

On 29 December he was appointed joint caretaker manager of Notts County.

As of 2018, he is Head of Coaching at the Coventry City academy.

Mick has been Head of Academy Coaching at West Bromwich Albion since 2019.

== Honours ==
Peterborough United

- Football League Third Division play-offs: 1992

Individual

- PFA Team of the Year: 1989–90 Fourth Division, 1990–91 Fourth Division
