= Tony Adcock =

English footballer (born 1963)

Personal information
- Full name: Anthony Charles Adcock
- Date of birth: 27 March 1963 (age 63)
- Place of birth: Bethnal Green, London, England
- Height: 5 ft 10 in (1.78 m)
- Position: Forward

Youth career
- Colchester United

Senior career*
| Years | Team | Apps | (Gls) |
| 1981–1987 | Colchester United | 210 | (98) |
| 1987–1988 | Manchester City | 15 | (5) |
| 1988–1989 | Northampton Town | 72 | (30) |
| 1989–1991 | Bradford City | 38 | (6) |
| 1991–1992 | Northampton Town | 35 | (10) |
| 1992–1994 | Peterborough United | 111 | (35) |
| 1994–1995 | Luton Town | 2 | (0) |
| 1995–1999 | Colchester United | 108 | (28) |
| 1999 | → Heybridge Swifts (loan) | | |
| 1999–2000 | Heybridge Swifts | | |
| Total | | 591 | (212) |
- * Club domestic league appearances and goals

Anthony Charles Adcock (born 27 March 1963) is an English former footballer who played as a forward in the Football League for Colchester United, where he holds the goalscoring record with 149 goals in all competitions for the club in two spells. Adcock also played for Manchester City, Northampton Town in two stints, Bradford City, Peterborough United and Luton Town. He scored 249 goals in just over 700 appearances throughout his career.

== Career ==
Born in Bethnal Green, London, Adcock began his career at Colchester United, where at the age of 18 years, he made his Football League debut on 2 May 1981 in the final game of the season, a 1–0 win over Carlisle United at Layer Road. He opened his goalscoring account in only his third league start with a brace in a 3–0 home victory against Torquay United on 18 September 1981.

Adcock became a prolific scorer for Colchester, and established himself in the first-team squad following the death of John Lyons and the departure of Kevin Bremner. In the 1984–85 season, having scored 17 goals and 26 goals in the previous two seasons respectively, Adcock was on course to break the club's seasonal and overall scoring records, having scored 24 league goals in just 27 games up until January 1985. However, after scoring a hat-trick against Chesterfield, he suffered a knee injury in training that kept him out for the remainder of the season. This was particularly unfortunate for Adcock as it had been rumoured that Liverpool were on the verge of making an offer for him. On his return from injury, he remained with the club for two further seasons, scoring 15 and 11 goals as he played his last game for the club on 17 May 1987, a play-off second leg against Wolverhampton Wanderers at Molineux, a game which the U's drew 0–0 but lost 2–0 on aggregate following a first-leg home defeat. Until this point, Adcock had scored 98 league goals in 210 outings.

After missing out on promotion with Colchester, Adcock finally got the chance to move to a bigger club when Manchester City picked him up for £75,000 in June 1987, but only made 15 appearances for City, scoring five goals, including being one of three players to score a hat-trick in a 10–1 thrashing of Huddersfield Town on 7 November 1987.

In January 1988, Adcock was signed by Northampton Town in exchange for Trevor Morley and the £85,000 fee was a record figure for the club at the time. During his first spell at Northampton, he netted 30 goals in 72 league appearances, but when the Cobblers were relegated to the Fourth Division in the 1988–89 season, he secured a £190,000 move to Bradford City in October 1989.

Having scored on his debut for after just 21 minutes for Bradford, he only managed a further five league goals for the club. The Bantams were relegated to the Third Division and Northampton re-signed Adcock for £75,000 in January 1991. The club's financial plight proved to be a blessing for Adcock as he scored 10 goals in 35 appearances, eventually being offloaded to Peterborough United in a £35,000 deal.

Adcock opened his scoring account for the Posh on 11 January 1992, netting a brace in a 4–1 win over Fulham. He scored 35 league goals in total for Peterborough in 111 appearances from 1992 to 1994, aiding the club to promotion to the newly restructured Division One via the play-offs in 1992.

When Peterborough were relegated from the First Division, Adcock was sold to Luton Town for £20,000 in August 1994, where he could only manage two substitute appearances, before being persuaded to return to Colchester United by manager Steve Wignall. Adcock returned in the summer of 1994, and he bagged another 28 league goals, featuring for the club at Wembley Stadium twice in as many years, losing in the 1997 Football League Trophy final on penalties to Carlisle United, and gaining promotion to Division Two in the 1998 Football League Third Division play-off final win over Torquay.

Adcock scored his last goal for the U's in an infamous FA Cup first round defeat by Bedlington Terriers, coming off the bench to score a consolation goal in the 88th minute of the 4–1 trouncing. He wound down his career by featuring on loan for Heybridge Swifts before joining the club permanently following his release from Colchester in 1999.

Adcock was inducted into the Colchester United 'Hall of Fame' in 2008. He was inducted during a ceremony following Colchester's final game at Layer Road prior to relocating to the Colchester Community Stadium. In 2012, he received the same honour at Peterborough United.

== Honours ==
Peterborough United

- Football League Third Division play-offs: 1992

Colchester United

- Football League Trophy runner-up: 1996–97

Individual

- PFA Team of the Year: 1984–85 Fourth Division
