= 1992 Football League play-offs =

Football League play-offs
- Season: 1991–92
- Champions: Blackburn Rovers (Second Division); Peterborough United (Third Division); Blackpool (Fourth Division)
- Matches played: 15
- Goals scored: 41 (2.73 per match)
- Biggest home win: Leicester 5–0 Cambridge (Second Division)
- Biggest away win: Huddersfield 1–2 Peterborough (Third Division)
- Highest scoring: Blackburn 4–2 Derby (6 goals)
- Highest attendance: 68,147 – Blackburn v Leicester (Second Division final)
- Lowest attendance: 5,629 – Barnet v Blackpool (Fourth Division semi-final)
- Average attendance: 18,510

The Football League play-offs for the 1991–92 season were held in May 1992, with the finals taking place at Wembley Stadium. The play-off semi-finals were also played over two legs and were contested by the teams who finished in 3rd, 4th, 5th and 6th place in the Football League Second Division, the 4th, 5th, 6th and 7th placed teams in the Football League Third Division and the 3rd, 4th, 5th and 6th place teams in the Football League Fourth Division table. The winners of the semi-finals progressed through to the finals, with the winner of these matches gaining promotion for the following season.

== Second Division ==
The Second Division season finished with Ipswich Town as champions and Middlesbrough as runners-up gaining automatic promotion to the new FA Premier League. This left Derby County and Blackburn Rovers, the two biggest spending teams in the division, facing each other in the one playoff semi-final, while the other was contested between Leicester City and a Cambridge United side who successful style of long ball play had taken them to the brink of a unique third successive promotion, while Leicester had made their first serious promotion challenge since being relegated from the First Division five years earlier.

Blackburn won the first leg 4-2 at Ewood Park, and Derby's 2-1 win in the return leg at the Baseball Ground was not enough to prevent the Lancastrian side from going through to the final. In the other semi-final, Cambridge held Leicester to a 1-1 draw at the Abbey Stadium before losing the return leg 5-0 at Filbert Street.

The final - and a place in the new Premier League - was settled by a single goal as Blackburn beat Leicester thanks to a penalty by former Leicester striker Mike Newell, securing Blackburn's return to the top flight of English football after 26 years away.

Pos	Team	Pld	W	D	L	GF	GA	GD	Pts
3	Derby County	46	23	9	14	69	51	+18	78
4	Leicester City	46	23	8	15	62	55	+7	77
5	Cambridge United	46	19	17	10	65	47	+18	74
6	Blackburn Rovers	46	21	11	14	70	53	+17	74

=== Semi-finals ===
First leg

10 May 1992
12:00

Cambridge United	1–1	Leicester City
O'Shea 76'		Russell 44'

Abbey Stadium, Cambridge
Attendance: 9,225
Referee: John Martin

10 May 1992
15:00

Blackburn Rovers	4–2	Derby County
Sellars 35'; Newell 44'; Speedie 66', 70'		Gabbiadini 2'; Johnson 14'

Ewood Park, Blackburn
Attendance: 19,677
Referee: Keith Hackett

Second leg

13 May 1992
19:45

Derby County	2–1	Blackburn Rovers
Comyn 23'; McMinn 74'		Moran 49'

Baseball Ground, Derby
Attendance: 22,920
Referee: David Elleray

Blackburn Rovers won 5–4 on aggregate.

13 May 1992
19:45

Leicester City	5–0	Cambridge United
Wright 29', 60'; Thompson 35'; Russell 59'; Ormondroyd 64'

Filbert Street, Leicester
Attendance: 21,024
Referee: Martin Bodenham

Leicester City won 6–1 on aggregate.

=== Final ===
25 May 1992
15:00

Blackburn Rovers	1–0	Leicester City
Newell 45' (pen.)

Wembley Stadium, London
Attendance: 68,147
Referee: George Courtney

== Third Division ==
Huddersfield Town's fourth season in the Third Division since relegation in 1988 saw their most serious promotion challenge in that time, but a third-place finish meant that they had to navigate a playoff semi-final clash with a Peterborough United side in the hunt for a second successive promotion. Peterborough went through, while Stockport County overcame Stoke City in the other semi-final to set up a playoff final clash between two teams who had both been promoted from the Fourth Division only a year earlier. Peterborough won the final 2-1 to reach the second tier of English football for the first time in their history; they were still among the newest ten clubs in the Football League having joined in 1960.

Pos	Team	Pld	W	D	L	GF	GA	GD	Pts
3	Huddersfield Town	46	22	12	12	59	38	+21	78
4	Stoke City	46	21	14	11	69	49	+20	77
5	Stockport County	46	22	10	14	75	51	+24	76
6	Peterborough United	46	20	14	12	65	58	+7	74

=== Semi-finals ===
First leg

10 May 1992
12:00

Stockport County	1–0	Stoke City
Ward 41'

Edgeley Park, Stockport
Attendance: 7,537

11 May 1992
19:45

Peterborough United	2–2	Huddersfield Town
Charlery 46'; Halsall 88'		Onuora 28'; Robinson 68' (o.g.)

London Road, Peterborough
Attendance: 11,751
Referee: David Elleray

Second leg

13 May 1992
19:45

Stoke City	1–1	Stockport County
Stein 81'		Beaumont 1'

Victoria Ground, Stoke-on-Trent
Attendance: 16,170

Stockport County won 2–1 on aggregate.

14 May 1992
19:45

Huddersfield Town	1–2	Peterborough United
Starbuck 2'		Sterling 69'; Cooper 86'

Leeds Road, Huddersfield
Attendance: 16,167
Referee: George Courtney

Peterborough United won 4–3 on aggregate.

=== Final ===
24 May 1992
15:00

Peterborough United	2–1	Stockport County
Charlery 51', 89'		Francis 87'

Wembley Stadium, London
Attendance: 35,087
Referee: Martin Bodenham

== Fourth Division ==
A year after losing the Fourth Division playoff final on penalties to Torquay United, Blackpool returned to Wembley for a showdown with Scunthorpe United and this time were the winning side as they triumphed on penalties after a 1-1 draw.

The Seasiders had overcome league newcomers Barnet in their semi-final, with Scunthorpe overcoming Crewe Alexandra in the other semi-final.

Pos	Team	Pld	W	D	L	GF	GA	GD	Pts
4	Blackpool	42	22	10	10	71	45	+26	74
5	Scunthorpe United	42	21	9	12	64	59	+5	72
6	Crewe Alexandra	42	20	10	12	66	51	+15	70
7	Barnet	42	21	6	15	81	61	+20	69

=== Semi-finals ===
First leg

10 May 1992
13:00

Barnet	1–0	Blackpool
Carter 29'

Underhill, London
Attendance: 5,629

10 May 1992
15:00

Crewe Alexandra	2–2	Scunthorpe United
Hignett 6'; Naylor 39'		Helliwell 17', 35'

Gresty Road, Crewe
Attendance: 6,063

Second leg

13 May 1992
19:30

Blackpool	2–0	Barnet
Groves 41'; Garner 57' (pen.)

Bloomfield Road, Blackpool
Attendance: 7,588

Blackpool won 2–1 on aggregate.

13 May 1992
19:30

Scunthorpe United	2–0	Crewe Alexandra
Martin 83'; Hamilton 89'

Glanford Park, Scunthorpe
Attendance: 7,938

Scunthorpe United won 4–2 on aggregate.

=== Final ===
23 May 1992
15:00

Blackpool	1–1 (a.e.t.)	Scunthorpe United
Bamber 40'		Daws 52'
Penalties
Cook (penalty scored); Groves (penalty scored); Garner (penalty scored); Eyres (penalty scored)	4–3	(penalty scored) Hamilton; (penalty scored) Longden; (penalty scored) Elliott; (penalty missed) Alexander; (penalty missed) White

Wembley Stadium, London
Attendance: 22,741
Referee: Keith Hackett
