= 1997–98 Northampton Town F.C. season =

Northampton Town
1997–98 season
- Chairman: Barry Stonhill
- Manager: Ian Atkins
- Stadium: Sixfields Stadium
- Division Two: 4th
- Play-offs: Runners-up
- FA Cup: Third round
- League Cup: First round
- League Trophy: Second round
- Top goalscorer: League: David Seal (12); All: David Seal (14)
- Highest home attendance: 7,501 vs Bristol Rovers
- Lowest home attendance: 2,631 vs Plymouth Argyle
- Average home league attendance: 6,389

The 1997–98 season was Northampton Town's 101st season in their history and the first season back in the Second Division after promotion the previous season. Alongside competing in Division Two, the club also participated in the FA Cup, League Cup and Football League Trophy.

== Players ==
As of match played 24 May 1998.

Name	Position	Nat.	Place of birth	Date of birth (age)	Apps	Goals	Previous club	Date signed	Fee
Goalkeepers
Billy Turley	GK	(England)	Wolverhampton	15 July 1973 (aged 24)	6	0	Evesham United	10 July 1995	Free
Andy Woodman	GK	(England)	Camberwell	11 August 1971 (aged 26)	174	0	Exeter City	10 March 1995	Free
Defenders
Charlie Bishop	CB	(England)	Nottingham	16 February 1968 (aged 30)	9	0	Wigan Athletic	1 December 1997	£20,000
David Brightwell	CB	(England)	Lutterworth	7 January 1971 (aged 27)	47	1	Bradford City	29 July 1997	Free
Ian Clarkson	RB	(England)	Solihull	4 December 1970 (aged 27)	109	2	Stoke City	2 August 1996	Free
Lee Colkin	LB	(England)	Nuneaton	15 July 1974 (aged 23)	119	4	Apprentice	31 August 1992	N/A
Jason Drysdale	LB	(England)	Bristol	17 November 1970 (aged 27)	1	0	Swindon Town	27 March 1998	Free
John Frain	LB	(England)	Birmingham	8 October 1968 (aged 29)	56	2	Birmingham City	Summer 1997	Free
Colin Hill	CB	(Northern Ireland)	Uxbridge (ENG)	12 November 1963 (aged 34)	36	0	Trelleborgs FF	19 November 1997	£30,000
Ian Sampson	CB	(England)	Wakefield	14 November 1968 (aged 29)	194	17	Sunderland	5 August 1994	£30,000
Ray Warburton (c)	CB	(England)	Rotherham	7 October 1967 (aged 30)	205	15	York City	4 February 1994	£35,000
Midfielders
Jason Dozzell	CM	(England)	Ipswich	9 December 1967 (aged 30)	25	4	Tottenham Hotspur	16 December 1997	Free
Ali Gibb	RM	(England)	Salisbury	17 February 1976 (aged 22)	93	3	Norwich City	5 February 1996	£30,000
James Hunt	CM	(England)	Derby	17 December 1976 (aged 21)	30	0	Notts County	1 August 1997	Free
Roy Hunter	CM	(England)	Saltburn-by-the-Sea	29 October 1973 (aged 24)	123	12	West Bromwich Albion	2 August 1995	Free
Sean Parrish	LM	(Wales)	Wrexham	14 March 1972 (aged 26)	58	8	Doncaster Rovers	2 August 1996	£35,000
Dean Peer	CM	(England)	Wordsley	8 August 1969 (aged 28)	115	5	Walsall	22 August 1995	Free
Michael Warner	CM	(England)	Harrogate	17 January 1974 (aged 24)	23	0	Tamworth	31 May 1995	Free
Forwards
Chris Freestone	FW	(England)	Nottingham	4 September 1971 (aged 26)	32	13	Middlesbrough	24 December 1997	£75,000
John Gayle	FW	(England)	Bromsgrove	30 July 1964 (aged 33)	60	12	Stoke City	10 February 1997	£25,000
Carl Heggs	FW	(England)	Leicester	11 October 1970 (aged 27)	44	9	Swansea City	1 August 1997	£25,000
Christian Lee	FW	(England)	Aylesbury	8 October 1976 (aged 21)	54	9	Doncaster Rovers	13 July 1995	Free
David Seal	FW	(Australia)	Penrith, NSW	26 January 1972 (aged 26)	46	14	Bristol City	12 September 1997	£90,000
Kevin Wilson	FW	(Northern Ireland)	Banbury (ENG)	18 April 1961 (aged 37)	10	0	Walsall	28 July 1997	Free

== Competitions ==
=== Football League Division Two ===
==== League table ====
Pos	Team	Pld	W	D	L	GF	GA	GD	Pts	Promotion or relegation
2	Bristol City (P)	46	25	10	11	69	39	+30	85	Promotion to the First Division
3	Grimsby Town (O, P)	46	19	15	12	55	37	+18	72	Qualification for the Second Division play-offs
4	Northampton Town	46	18	17	11	52	37	+15	71	Qualification for the Second Division play-offs
5	Bristol Rovers	46	20	10	16	70	64	+6	70	Qualification for the Second Division play-offs
6	Fulham	46	20	10	16	60	43	+17	70	Qualification for the Second Division play-offs

Rules for classification: In the Football League goals scored (GF) takes precedence over goal difference (GD).
(O) Play-off winners; (P) Promoted

==== Results summary ====
Overall								Home						Away					
Pld	W	D	L	GF	GA	GD	Pts	W	D	L	GF	GA	GD	W	D	L	GF	GA	GD
46	18	17	11	52	37	+15	71	14	5	4	33	17	+16	4	12	7	19	20	−1

Last updated: 22 April 2020.

==== League position by match ====
Round	1	2	3	4	5	6	7	8	9	10	11	12	13	14	15	16	17	18	19	20	21	22	23	24	25	26	27	28	29	30	31	32	33	34	35	36	37	38	39	40	41	42	43	44	45	46
Ground	H	A	H	A	A	H	A	H	H	A	A	H	H	A	H	A	A	H	H	A	H	A	H	A	H	A	H	A	H	A	H	H	A	A	H	H	A	H	A	A	H	A	H	A	H	A
Result	L	D	W	W	W	W	D	W	W	D	L	W	D	D	D	D	L	W	L	L	D	L	W	D	W	L	W	D	D	D	W	W	D	L	W	L	W	W	D	D	L	L	D	W	W	D
Position	22	20	15	9	6	3	3	2	1	2	2	2	2	2	3	3	4	3	4	5	5	6	4	4	3	5	4	4	5	7	4	3	3	5	3	4	4	4	5	4	6	7	7	5	5	4

Source: Rothmans Football Yearbook 1998-1999
A = Away; H = Home; W = Win; D = Draw; L = Loss

==== Matches ====
Win Draw Loss

9 August 1997 1	Northampton Town	0–2	Bournemouth	Northampton
15:00 BST			J.Vincent 69'; S.Fletcher 75'	Stadium: Sixfields Stadium; Attendance: 6,384; Referee: Eddie Lomas

16 August 1997 2	Wycombe Wanderers	0–0	Northampton Town	High Wycombe
15:00 BST				Stadium: Adams Park; Attendance: 5,130; Referee: Barry Knight

23 August 1997 3	Northampton Town	2–1	Bristol City	Northampton
15:00 BST	D.Seal 23'; J.Gayle 45'		C.Cramb 5'	Stadium: Sixfields Stadium; Attendance: 6,217; Referee: Paul Taylor

30 August 1997 4	Carlisle United	0–2	Northampton Town	Carlisle
15:00 BST			D.Seal 16', 33'	Stadium: Brunton Park; Attendance: 6,037; Referee: R.Pearson

2 September 1997 5	Walsall	0–2	Northampton Town	Walsall
19:45 BST			D.Seal 30'; J.Gayle 80'	Stadium: Bescot Stadium; Attendance: 4,435; Referee: Terry Heilbron

9 September 1997 6	Northampton Town	1–0	Luton Town	Northampton
19:45 BST	S.Parrish 2'		G.McGowan (red card) 44'	Stadium: Sixfields Stadium; Attendance: 7,246

13 September 1997 7	Oldham Athletic	2–2	Northampton Town	Oldham
15:00 BST	R.Graham 12'; S.McNiven 35'		D.Seal 1'; R.Hunter 65' (pen.)	Stadium: Boundary Park; Attendance: 5,829

20 September 1997 8	Northampton Town	1–0	Wigan Athletic	Northampton
15:00 BST	D.Seal 54'			Stadium: Sixfields Stadium; Attendance: 6,570; Referee: Paul Danson

27 September 1997 9	Northampton Town	2–0	Millwall	Northampton
15:00 BST	I.Sampson 53'; R.Hunter 65' (pen.)		P.Sturgess (red card) 62'	Attendance: 6,578; Referee: Steve Baines

4 October 1997 10	Southend United	0–0	Northampton Town	Southend-on-Sea
15:00 BST				Stadium: Roots Hall; Attendance: 4,304; Referee: Andy Butler

11 October 1997 11	Grimsby Town	1–0	Northampton Town	Cleethorpes
15:00 BST	K.Donovan 44'			Stadium: Blundell Park; Attendance: 5,096; Referee: Guy Stretton

18 October 1997 12	Northampton Town	2–1	Gillingham	Northampton
15:00 BST	J.Gayle 35'; C.Heggs 39'		A.Akinbiyi 53'; P.Smith (red card) 77'	Stadium: Sixfields Stadium; Attendance: 7,191; Referee: Gurnam Singh

21 October 1997 13	Northampton Town	1–1	York City	Northampton
19:45 BST	R.Hunter 6' (pen.)		R.Rowe 48'	Stadium: Sixfields Stadium; Attendance: 6,029; Referee: M.Brandwood

25 October 1997 14	Fulham	1–1	Northampton Town	Fulham, London
15:00 BST	P.Peschisolido 43'		J.Gayle 50'	Stadium: Craven Cottage; Attendance: 9,848; Referee: Martin Fletcher

1 November 1997 15	Northampton Town	1–1	Bristol Rovers	Northampton
15:00 GMT	J.Gayle 57'		B.Gayle (red card) 67'; J.Cureton 79'	Stadium: Sixfields Stadium; Attendance: 7,264; Referee: Scott Mathieson

4 November 1997 16	Blackpool	1–1	Northampton Town	Blackpool
19:30 GMT	P.Clarkson 37'		I.Sampson 75'	Stadium: Bloomfield Road; Attendance: 3,685; Referee: Kevin Lynch

8 November 1997 17	Wrexham	1–0	Northampton Town	Wrexham, Wales
15:00 GMT	N.Roberts 48'			Stadium: Racecourse Ground; Attendance: 3,768; Referee: Graham Laws

18 November 1997 18	Northampton Town	4–0	Brentford	Northampton
19:45 GMT	C.Heggs 4'; J.Gayle 10'; D.Seal 40', 43'			Stadium: Sixfields Stadium; Attendance: 5,227; Referee: Mick Pierce

22 November 1997 19	Northampton Town	0–1	Watford	Northampton
15:00 GMT			P.Kennedy 57'	Stadium: Sixfields Stadium; Attendance: 7,373; Referee: Paul Robinson

29 November 1997 20	Burnley	2–1	Northampton Town	Burnley
15:00 GMT	N.Moore 76'; P.Barnes 82'		A.Gibb 49'	Stadium: Turf Moor; Attendance: 8,366; Referee: Matt Messias

2 December 1997 21	Northampton Town	0–0	Chesterfield	Northampton
19:45 GMT				Stadium: Sixfields Stadium; Attendance: 4,828; Referee: Eddie Wolstenholme

13 December 1997 22	Preston North End	1–0	Northampton Town	Preston
15:00 GMT	J.Macken 56'			Stadium: Deepdale; Attendance: 7,448; Referee: Mike Pike

20 December 1997 23	Northampton Town	2–1	Plymouth Argyle	Northampton
15:00 GMT	C.Freestone 66', 71'		C.Corazzin 45'	Stadium: Sixfields Stadium; Attendance: 5,546; Referee: David Pugh

26 December 1997 24	Luton Town	2–2	Northampton Town	Luton
15:00 GMT	D.Oldfield 67'; T.Thorpe 85'		J.Dozzell 8' (pen.); A.White 13' (o.g.)	Stadium: Kenilworth Road; Attendance: 8,856; Referee: Clive Wilkes

28 December 1997 25	Northampton Town	3–2	Walsall	Northampton
12:00 GMT	D.Seal 31'; C.Freestone 48'; J.Dozzell 54'		G.Porter 40'; J.Hodge 61'	Stadium: Sixfields Stadium; Attendance: 7,094; Referee: Roger Furnandiz

10 January 1998 26	Bournemouth	3–0	Northampton Town	Bournemouth
15:00 GMT	S.Jones 63'; S.Fletcher 78'; N.Young 83'			Stadium: Dean Court; Attendance: 4,257; Referee: Mike Bailey

17 January 1998 27	Northampton Town	2–1	Carlisle United	Northampton
15:00 GMT	C.Heggs 54'; J.Dozzell 77'		I.Stevens 37'	Stadium: Sixfields Stadium; Attendance: 6,327; Referee: Brian Coddington

24 January 1998 28	Bristol City	0–0	Northampton Town	Bristol
15:00 GMT				Stadium: Ashton Gate; Attendance: 14,753

31 January 1998 29	Northampton Town	0–0	Oldham Athletic	Northampton
15:00 GMT				Stadium: Sixfields Stadium; Attendance: 6,559; Referee: David Orr

7 February 1998 30	Wigan Athletic	1–1	Northampton Town	Wigan
15:00 GMT	S.Morgan 60'		C.Freestone 68'	Stadium: Springfield Park; Attendance: 3,579; Referee: R.Pearson

10 February 1998 31	Northampton Town	2–0	Wycombe Wanderers	Northampton
19:45 GMT	D.Seal 59' (pen.); C.Freestone 69'			Stadium: Sixfields Stadium; Attendance: 5,303; Referee: George Cain

14 February 1998 32	Northampton Town	3–1	Southend United	Northampton
15:00 GMT	C.Freestone 30'; D.Brightwell 42'; J.Frain 55'		J.Boere 34' (red card) 70'	Stadium: Sixfields Stadium; Attendance: 6,147; Referee: Tony Leake

21 February 1998 33	Millwall	0–0	Northampton Town	Millwall, London
15:00 GMT				Stadium: The Den; Attendance: 6,007; Referee: Andy D'Urso

24 February 1998 34	Gillingham	1–0	Northampton Town	Gillingham
19:45 GMT	G.Butters 69' (pen.)			Stadium: Priestfield; Attendance: 6,405; Referee: Mark Halsey

28 February 1998 35	Northampton Town	2–1	Grimsby Town	Northampton
15:00 GMT	D.Seal 59' (pen.); N.Gleghorn 64'		K.Donovan 17'	Stadium: Sixfields Stadium; Attendance: 6,932; Referee: Barry Knight

3 March 1998 36	Northampton Town	0–1	Wrexham	Northampton
19:30 GMT			D.Spink 39'	Stadium: Sixfields Stadium; Attendance: 5,183; Referee: David Crick

7 March 1998 37	Bristol Rovers	0–2	Northampton Town	Bristol
15:00 GMT			C.Freestone 34'; J.Dozzell 61' (pen.); C.Bishop (red card) 79'	Stadium: Memorial Stadium; Attendance: 6,535; Referee: Paul Rejer

14 March 1998 38	Northampton Town	2–0	Blackpool	Northampton
15:00 GMT	C.Freestone 27'; C.Heggs 73'			Stadium: Sixfields Stadium; Attendance: 6,586; Referee: Mike Jones

21 March 1998 39	Brentford	0–0	Northampton Town	Brentford, London
15:00 GMT	R.Taylor (red card) 87'			Stadium: Griffin Park; Attendance: 5,746; Referee: Alan Wiley

28 March 1998 40	Watford	1–1	Northampton Town	Watford
15:00 GMT	R.Johnson 57'		D.Peer 84'	Stadium: Vicarage Road; Attendance: 14,268; Referee: Clive Wilkes

4 April 1998 41	Northampton Town	0–1	Burnley	Northampton
15:00 BST	C.Heggs (red card) 86'		A.Payton 16'	Stadium: Sixfields Stadium; Attendance: 7,264; Referee: Andy Hall

11 April 1998 42	Chesterfield	2–1	Northampton Town	Chesterfield
15:00 BST	I.Breckin 48'; M.Williams 71'		I.Clarkson 9'	Stadium: Saltergate; Attendance: 5,064; Referee: Eddie Wolstenholme

13 April 1998 43	Northampton Town	2–2	Preston North End	Northampton
15:00 BST	I.Sampson 78'; D.Seal 82'		L.Ashcroft 45'; J.Macken 90'	Stadium: Sixfields Stadium; Attendance: 5,664; Referee: Mick Fletcher

18 April 1998 44	Plymouth Argyle	1–3	Northampton Town	Plymouth
15:00 BST	M.Saunders 45'		C.Freestone 8', 47', 90'	Stadium: Home Park; Attendance: 6,389

25 April 1998 45	Northampton Town	1–0	Fulham	Northampton
15:00 BST	D.Peer 58'			Stadium: Sixfields Stadium; Attendance: 7,443; Referee: Chris Foy

2 May 1998 46	York City	0–0	Northampton Town	York
15:00 BST				Stadium: Bootham Crescent; Attendance: 6,688; Referee: Andy Butler

==== Play-offs ====
10 May 1998 Semi-final 1st Leg	Bristol Rovers	3–1	Northampton Town	Bristol
15:00 BST	P.Beadle 30' (pen.); F.Bennett 37'; B.Hayles 46'		J.Gayle 74'	Stadium: Memorial Stadium; Attendance: 9,173; Referee: Rob Harris

13 May 1998 Semi-final 2nd Leg	Northampton Town	3–0 (4–3 agg.)	Bristol Rovers	Northampton
19:45 BST	C.Heggs 34'; I.Clarkson 61'; R.Warburton 77'			Stadium: Sixfields Stadium; Attendance: 7,501; Referee: Mick Fletcher

24 May 1998 Final	Grimsby Town	1–0	Northampton Town	London
15:00 BST	K.Donovan 19'			Stadium: Wembley Stadium; Attendance: 62,988; Referee: Terry Heilbron

=== FA Cup ===
15 November 1997 First round	Exeter City	1–1	Northampton Town	Exeter
15:00 GMT	D.Rowbotham 32'		R.Hunter 37'	Stadium: St James Park; Referee: Kevin Lynch

25 November 1997 First round replay	Northampton Town	2–1	Exeter City	Northampton
19:45 GMT	R.Hunter 10'; C.Heggs 86'		B.Clark 43'	Stadium: Sixfields Stadium; Referee: Kevin Lynch

6 December 1997 Second round	Northampton Town	1–1	Basingstoke Town	Northampton
15:00 GMT	D.Seal 39'		Carey 75'	Stadium: Sixfields Stadium; Referee: Andy Butler

16 December 1997 Second round replay	Basingstoke Town	0–0 (a.e.t.) (3–4 p)	Northampton Town	Basingstoke
19:45 GMT				Stadium: Winchester Road; Referee: David Orr

3 January 1998 Third round	Leicester City	4–0	Northampton Town	Leicester
15:00 GMT	I.Marshall 17'; G.Parker 26' (pen.); R.Savage 53'; T.Cottee 58'		I.Clarkson (red card) 69'	Stadium: Filbert Street; Attendance: 20,608; Referee: Alan Wilkie

=== League Cup ===
12 August 1997 First round first leg	Northampton Town	2–1	Millwall	Northampton
19:45 BST	J.Gayle 60'; D.Seal 65'		K.Grant 33'	Stadium: Sixfields Stadium; Referee: John Kirkby

27 August 1997 First round second leg	Millwall	2–1 (a.e.t.) (0–2 p)	Northampton Town	Millwall
19:45 BST	D.Hockton 51', 61'		J.Gayle 90'	Stadium: The Den; Referee: Mark Halsey

=== League Trophy ===
9 December 1997 First round	Northampton Town	1–1 (a.e.t.) (5–3 p)	Plymouth Argyle	Northampton
19:45 GMT	C.Heggs 82'		D.O'Hagan 69'	Stadium: Sixfields Stadium; Attendance: 2,631; Referee: Steve Baines

13 January 1998 Second round	Northampton Town	5–1	Torquay United	Northampton
19:45 GMT	C.Freestone 28', 64'; J.Frain 51'; C.Heggs 67', 80'		K.Veysey (red card) 49'; J.Gittens 73'	Stadium: Sixfields Stadium; Attendance: 2,845; Referee: Rob Styles

13 January 1998 Quarter-final	Peterborough United	2–1	Northampton Town	Peterborough
19:45 GMT	S.Castle 7'; A.Edwards 60'		I.Sampson 24'	Stadium: London Road; Attendance: 5,516; Referee: Terry Heilbron

=== Appearances, goals and cards ===
Pos	Player	Division Two			FA Cup			League Cup			League Trophy			Play-offs			Total			Discipline	
Pos	Player	Starts	Sub	Goals	Starts	Sub	Goals	Starts	Sub	Goals	Starts	Sub	Goals	Starts	Sub	Goals	Starts	Sub	Goals	Booked	Sent off (straight red)
GK	Billy Turley	–	–	–	–	–	–	–	–	–	3	–	–	–	–	–	3	–	–	–	–
GK	Andy Woodman	46	–	–	5	–	–	2	–	–	–	–	–	3	–	–	56	–	–	1	–
DF	Charlie Bishop	7	1	–	–	–	–	–	–	–	–	–	–	1	–	–	8	1	–	1	1
DF	David Brightwell	34	1	1	5	–	–	2	–	–	2	–	–	–	1	–	45	2	1	2	–
DF	Ian Clarkson	42	–	1	5	–	–	2	–	–	1	–	–	3	–	1	53	–	2	6	1
DF	Lee Colkin	–	–	–	–	–	–	–	–	–	1	1	–	–	–	–	1	1	–	1	–
DF	Jason Drysdale	1	–	–	–	–	–	–	–	–	–	–	–	–	–	–	1	–	–	–	–
DF	John Frain	45	–	1	5	–	–	2	–	–	3	–	1	3	–	–	58	–	2	3	–
DF	Colin Hill	27	–	–	3	–	–	–	–	–	3	–	–	3	–	–	36	–	–	6	–
DF	Ian Sampson	39	–	3	2	–	–	2	–	–	1	–	1	3	–	–	47	–	4	6	–
DF	Dean Tallentire	–	–	–	–	–	–	–	–	–	–	–	–	–	–	–	–	–	–	–	–
DF	Ray Warburton	39	–	–	3	–	–	2	–	–	2	–	–	3	–	1	49	–	1	6	–
MF	Jason Dozzell	18	3	4	1	–	–	–	–	–	2	–	–	1	–	–	22	3	4	–	–
MF	Ali Gibb	6	28	1	2	3	–	–	2	–	2	–	–	–	2	–	10	35	1	–	–
MF	James Hunt	14	7	–	1	2	–	–	–	–	3	–	–	3	–	–	21	9	–	6	–
MF	Roy Hunter	28	–	3	5	–	2	2	–	–	3	–	–	–	–	–	38	–	5	5	–
MF	Sean Parrish	12	–	1	–	–	–	2	–	–	–	–	–	–	–	–	14	–	1	2	–
MF	Dean Peer	26	4	2	4	–	–	–	–	–	–	–	–	2	1	–	32	5	2	4	–
MF	Michael Warner	3	7	–	–	–	–	–	–	–	–	2	–	–	–	–	3	9	–	–	–
FW	Chris Freestone	23	2	11	1	–	–	–	–	–	2	1	2	3	–	–	29	3	13	4	–
FW	John Gayle	26	9	6	4	–	–	1	1	2	1	1	–	3	–	1	35	11	9	10	–
FW	Carl Heggs	21	12	4	4	1	1	1	1	–	1	1	3	2	–	1	29	15	9	9	1
FW	Christian Lee	3	3	–	1	–	–	1	–	–	1	–	–	–	–	–	6	3	–	–	–
FW	David Seal	30	7	12	2	1	1	2	–	1	1	1	–	–	2	–	35	11	14	4	–
FW	Kevin Wilson	1	8	–	–	1	–	–	–	–	–	–	–	–	–	–	1	9	–	–	–
Players who left before end of season:
DF	Graham Potter	4	–	–	–	–	–	–	–	–	1	–	–	–	–	–	5	–	–	–	–
DF	David Rennie	3	2	–	1	–	–	–	–	–	–	–	–	–	–	–	4	2	–	1	–
MF	Nigel Gleghorn	3	5	1	–	–	–	–	–	–	–	–	–	–	–	–	3	5	1	1	–
MF	Paul Tait	2	1	–	–	–	–	–	–	–	–	–	–	–	–	–	2	1	–	1	–
FW	Paul Conway	2	1	–	–	–	–	1	–	–	–	–	–	–	–	–	3	1	–	2	–
FW	Claudio De Vito	–	–	–	–	–	–	–	–	–	–	–	–	–	–	–	–	–	–	–	–
FW	Laurens ten Heuvel	–	–	–	–	–	–	–	–	–	–	–	–	–	–	–	–	–	–	–	–
FW	Raymond Van Dullemen	–	1	–	–	–	–	–	1	–	–	–	–	–	–	–	–	2	–	–	–
FW	Colin West	1	1	–	–	–	–	–	–	–	–	–	–	–	–	–	1	1	–	–	–
