= 1996–97 Northampton Town F.C. season =

Northampton Town
1996–97 season
- Chairman: Barry Ward
- Manager: Ian Atkins
- Stadium: Sixfields Stadium
- Division Three: 4th
- Play-offs: Winners
- FA Cup: First round
- League Cup: Second round
- League Trophy: Semi-final
- Top goalscorer: League: Neil Grayson (12); All: Neil Grayson (12)
- Highest home attendance: 7,342 vs Watford
- Lowest home attendance: 3,519 vs Hull City
- Average home league attendance: 4,825

The 1996–97 season was Northampton Town's Centenary season in their history and the seventh successive season in the Third Division. Alongside competing in Division Three, the club also participated in the FA Cup, League Cup and Football League Trophy.

== Players ==
As of match played 24 May 1997.

| Name | Position | Nat. | Place of birth | Date of birth (age) | Apps | Goals | Previous club | Date signed | Fee |
Goalkeepers
| Stuart Brock | GK | (England) | West Bromwich | 26 September 1976 (aged 20) | 0 | 0 | Aston Villa | 27 March 1997 | Free |
| Billy Turley | GK | (England) | Wolverhampton | 15 July 1973 (aged 23) | 3 | 0 | Evesham United | 10 July 1995 | Free |
| Andy Woodman | GK | (England) | Camberwell | 11 August 1971 (aged 25) | 118 | 0 | Exeter City | 10 March 1995 | Free |
Defenders
| Ian Clarkson | RB | (England) | Solihull | 4 December 1970 (aged 26) | 56 | 0 | Stoke City | 2 August 1996 | Free |
| Lee Colkin | LB | (England) | Nuneaton | 15 July 1974 (aged 22) | 117 | 4 | Apprentice | 31 August 1992 | N/A |
| John Frain | LB | (England) | Birmingham | 8 October 1968 (aged 28) | 17 | 1 | Birmingham City | 24 January 1997 | Loan |
| Lee Maddison | LB | (England) | Bristol | 5 October 1972 (aged 24) | 66 | 0 | Bristol Rovers | 22 September 1995 | £25,000 |
| David Rennie | CB | (Scotland) | Edinburgh | 29 August 1964 (aged 32) | 43 | 4 | Coventry City | 5 August 1996 | Free |
| Ian Sampson | CB | (England) | Wakefield | 14 November 1968 (aged 28) | 147 | 13 | Sunderland | 5 August 1994 | £30,000 |
| Ray Warburton (c) | CB | (England) | Rotherham | 7 October 1967 (aged 29) | 156 | 14 | York City | 4 February 1994 | £35,000 |
Midfielders
| Ali Gibb | RM | (England) | Salisbury | 17 February 1976 (aged 21) | 48 | 2 | Norwich City | 5 February 1996 | £30,000 |
| Roy Hunter | CM | (England) | Saltburn-by-the-Sea | 29 October 1973 (aged 23) | 85 | 7 | West Bromwich Albion | 2 August 1995 | Free |
| Dave Martin | CM | (England) | East Ham | 25 April 1963 (aged 34) | 14 | 2 | Leyton Orient | 11 October 1996 | Free |
| Danny O'Shea | CM | (England) | Newington | 26 March 1963 (aged 34) | 87 | 0 | Cambridge United | 23 March 1995 | Free |
| Sean Parrish | LM | (Wales) | Wrexham | 14 March 1972 (aged 25) | 47 | 9 | Doncaster Rovers | 2 August 1996 | £35,000 |
| Dean Peer | CM | (England) | Wordsley | 8 August 1969 (aged 27) | 78 | 3 | Walsall | 22 August 1995 | Free |
| Michael Warner | CM | (England) | Harrogate | 17 January 1974 (aged 23) | 11 | 0 | Tamworth | 31 May 1995 | Free |
Forwards
| Mark Cooper | FW | (England) | Watford | 5 April 1967 (aged 30) | 46 | 10 | Barnet | 2 August 1996 | Free |
| John Gayle | FW | (England) | Bromsgrove | 30 July 1964 (aged 32) | 14 | 3 | Stoke City | 10 February 1997 | £25,000 |
| Neil Grayson | FW | (England) | York | 1 November 1964 (aged 32) | 141 | 34 | Boston United | 19 June 1994 | Free |
| Garry Thompson | FW | (England) | Kings Heath | 7 October 1959 (aged 37) | 52 | 6 | Cardiff City | 10 February 1995 | Free |
| Christian Lee | FW | (England) | Aylesbury | 8 October 1976 (aged 20) | 45 | 9 | Doncaster Rovers | 13 July 1995 | Free |
| Jason White | FW | (England) | Meriden | 19 October 1971 (aged 25) | 92 | 18 | Scarborough | 15 June 1995 | £35,000 |

== Competitions ==
=== Football League Division Three ===
==== League table ====
| Pos | Team | Pld | W | D | L | GF | GA | GD | Pts | Promotion or relegation |
|---|---|---|---|---|---|---|---|---|---|---|
| 2 | Fulham (P) | 46 | 25 | 12 | 9 | 72 | 38 | +34 | 87 | Promotion to the Second Division |
| 3 | Carlisle United (P) | 46 | 24 | 12 | 10 | 67 | 44 | +23 | 84 | Promotion to the Second Division |
| 4 | Northampton Town (O, P) | 46 | 20 | 12 | 14 | 67 | 44 | +23 | 72 | Qualification for the Third Division play-offs |
| 5 | Swansea City | 46 | 21 | 8 | 17 | 62 | 58 | +4 | 71 | Qualification for the Third Division play-offs |
| 6 | Chester City | 46 | 18 | 16 | 12 | 55 | 43 | +12 | 70 | Qualification for the Third Division play-offs |

Rules for classification: In the Football League goals scored (GF) takes precedence over goal difference (GD).
(O) Play-off winners; (P) Promoted

==== Results summary ====
| Overall | | | | | | | | Home | | | | | | Away | | | | | |
| Pld | W | D | L | GF | GA | GD | Pts | W | D | L | GF | GA | GD | W | D | L | GF | GA | GD |
|---|---|---|---|---|---|---|---|---|---|---|---|---|---|---|---|---|---|---|---|
| 46 | 20 | 12 | 14 | 67 | 44 | +23 | 72 | 14 | 4 | 5 | 43 | 17 | +26 | 6 | 8 | 9 | 24 | 27 | −3 |

Last updated: 26 April 2020.

==== League position by match ====
| Round | 1 | 2 | 3 | 4 | 5 | 6 | 7 | 8 | 9 | 10 | 11 | 12 | 13 | 14 | 15 | 16 | 17 | 18 | 19 | 20 | 21 | 22 | 23 | 24 | 25 | 26 | 27 | 28 | 29 | 30 | 31 | 32 | 33 | 34 | 35 | 36 | 37 | 38 | 39 | 40 | 41 | 42 | 43 | 44 | 45 | 46 |
|---|---|---|---|---|---|---|---|---|---|---|---|---|---|---|---|---|---|---|---|---|---|---|---|---|---|---|---|---|---|---|---|---|---|---|---|---|---|---|---|---|---|---|---|---|---|---|
| Ground | A | H | H | A | A | H | H | A | H | A | H | A | A | H | H | A | A | H | A | H | A | H | A | H | A | H | H | H | H | A | H | A | H | H | A | A | H | A | H | A | H | A | A | H | A | H |
| Result | L | W | D | D | D | L | L | D | W | L | L | W | L | W | W | W | L | D | W | D | L | W | D | W | L | W | W | W | W | L | L | D | W | D | L | W | D | L | L | W | W | D | W | W | D | W |
| Position | 17 | 10 | 11 | 10 | 12 | 16 | 19 | 20 | 15 | 16 | 21 | 16 | 20 | 14 | 13 | 10 | 12 | 12 | 10 | 11 | 15 | 10 | 11 | 7 | 10 | 6 | 5 | 6 | 5 | 6 | 7 | 8 | 8 | 9 | 10 | 8 | 8 | 10 | 10 | 9 | 6 | 6 | 5 | 5 | 6 | 4 |

Source: Rothmans Football Yearbook 1997-1998
A = Away; H = Home; W = Win; D = Draw; L = Loss

==== Matches ====
Win Draw Loss

| 17 August 1996 1 | Wigan Athletic | 2–1 | Northampton Town | Wigan |
| 15:00 BST | K.Sharp (red card) 50'; G.Lancashire 56'; W.Biggins 73' | | M.Cooper 28'; D.O'Shea (red card) 40'; D.Peer (red card) 50' | Stadium: Springfield Park; Attendance: 2,499 |

| 24 August 1996 2 | Northampton Town | 3–0 | Mansfield Town | Northampton |
| 15:00 BST | D.Rennie 36'; R.Hunter 53'; M.Cooper 85' | | M.Sale (red card) 81' | Stadium: Sixfields Stadium; Attendance: 4,162; Referee: Carl Finch |

| 27 August 1996 3 | Northampton Town | 1–1 | Torquay United | Northampton |
| 19:45 BST | D.Rennie 85' | | R.Jack 4' | Stadium: Sixfields Stadium; Attendance: 4,128 |

| 31 August 1996 4 | Scarborough | 1–1 | Northampton Town | Scarborough |
| 15:00 BST | G.Bennett 76' | | C.Lee 85' | Stadium: Athletic Ground; Attendance: 2,520 |

| 7 September 1996 5 | Barnet | 1–1 | Northampton Town | Chipping Barnet |
| 15:00 BST | S.Devine 55' | | C.Lee 6' | Stadium: Underhill Stadium; Attendance: 2,982 |

| 10 September 1996 6 | Northampton Town | 0–1 | Leyton Orient | Northampton |
| 19:45 BST | | | D.Chapman 90' | Stadium: Sixfields Stadium; Attendance: 3,994 |

| 14 September 1996 7 | Northampton Town | 1–2 | Cambridge United | Northampton |
| 15:00 BST | I.Sampson 63' | | M.Hyde 32'; T.Richards 58' | Stadium: Sixfields Stadium; Attendance: 4,584 |

| 21 September 1996 8 | Cardiff City | 2–2 | Northampton Town | Cardiff, Wales |
| 15:00 BST | T.Philliskirk 18'; C.Middleton 83' | | M.Cooper 87'; R.Hunter 89' (pen.) | Stadium: Ninian Park; Attendance: 4,124 |

| 28 September 1996 9 | Northampton Town | 3–0 | Brighton & Hove Albion | Northampton |
| 15:00 BST | R.Hunter 27' (pen.); C.Lee 30'; A.Gibb 54' | | | Stadium: Sixfields Stadium; Attendance: 4,402 |

| 1 October 1996 10 | Chester City | 2–1 | Northampton Town | Chester |
| 19:30 BST | D.Flitcroft 55'; K.Noteman 79' | | N.Grayson 72' | Stadium: Deva Stadium; Attendance: 1,791 |

| 5 October 1996 11 | Northampton Town | 0–1 | Fulham | Northampton |
| 15:00 BST | | | M.Conroy 54' | Stadium: Sixfields Stadium; Attendance: 6,171 |

| 12 October 1996 12 | Exeter City | 0–1 | Northampton Town | Exeter |
| 15:00 BST | | | C.Lee 29' | Stadium: St James Park; Attendance: 3,002 |

| 16 October 1996 13 | Scunthorpe United | 2–1 | Northampton Town | Scunthorpe |
| 19:30 BST | D.D'Auria 80'; C.Hope 90' | | I.Sampson 16' | Stadium: Glanford Park; Attendance: 2,079 |

| 19 October 1996 14 | Northampton Town | 2–1 | Colchester United | Northampton |
| 15:00 BST | S.Parrish 45'; N.Grayson 55' | Report | C.Fry 41' | Stadium: Sixfields Stadium; Attendance: 4,119; Referee: Steve Baines |

| 26 October 1996 15 | Northampton Town | 3–1 | Darlington | Northampton |
| 15:00 BST | N.Grayson 52'; R.Warburton 61'; S.Parrish 90' | | G.Naylor 15'; D.Roberts (red card) 41' | Stadium: Sixfields Stadium; Attendance: 4,123 |

| 29 October 1996 16 | Hartlepool United | 0–2 | Northampton Town | Hartlepool |
| 19:30 GMT | | | N.Grayson 1'; S.Parrish 22' | Stadium: Victoria Park; Attendance: 1,254 |

| 2 November 1996 17 | Swansea City | 1–0 | Northampton Town | Swansea, Wales |
| 15:00 GMT | S.Torpey 67' | | | Stadium: Vetch Field; Attendance: 3,335 |

| 9 November 1996 18 | Northampton Town | 1–1 | Carlisle United | Northampton |
| 15:00 GMT | S.Parrish 52' | | P.Conway 59'; S.Hayward (red card) 80' | Stadium: Sixfields Stadium; Attendance: 4,682 |

| 19 November 1996 19 | Doncaster Rovers | 1–2 | Northampton Town | Doncaster |
| 19:30 GMT | J.Schofield 54' | | R.Warburton 1'; M.Rush 61' | Stadium: Belle Vue; Attendance: 1,030 |

| 23 November 1996 20 | Northampton Town | 2–2 | Rochdale | Northampton |
| 15:00 GMT | R.Hunter 2'; J.White 69' | | A.Farrell 66', 68' | Stadium: Sixfields Stadium; Attendance: 3,836 |

| 30 November 1996 21 | Darlington | 3–1 | Northampton Town | Darlington |
| 15:00 GMT | S.Shaw 46'; D.Roberts 73', 77' | | M.Cooper 39' | Stadium: Feethams; Attendance: 1,030 |

| 3 December 1996 22 | Northampton Town | 2–1 | Hull City | Northampton |
| 19:45 GMT | P.Stant 7', 23' (pen.) | | D.Darby 57' | Stadium: Sixfields Stadium; Attendance: 3,519 |

| 14 December 1996 23 | Lincoln City | 1–1 | Northampton Town | Lincoln |
| 15:00 GMT | G.Ainsworth 67' | | D.Rennie 33' | Stadium: Sincil Bank; Attendance: 2,702 |

| 20 December 1996 24 | Northampton Town | 1–0 | Hereford United | Northampton |
| 19:45 GMT | N.Grayson 77' | | | Stadium: Sixfields Stadium; Attendance: 4,238 |

| 26 December 1996 25 | Leyton Orient | 2–1 | Northampton Town | Leyton, London |
| 15:00 GMT | J.Channing 6'; A.Inglethorpe 79' | | N.Grayson 22' | Stadium: Brisbane Road; Attendance: 4,492 |

| 28 December 1996 26 | Northampton Town | 2–0 | Barnet | Northampton |
| 15:00 GMT | I.Sampson 40'; M.Cooper 81' | | | Stadium: Sixfields Stadium; Attendance: 5,060 |

| 1 January 1997 27 | Northampton Town | 4–0 | Cardiff City | Northampton |
| 15:00 GMT | R.Warburton 16'; L.Jarman 42' (o.g.); M.Cooper 54'; N.Grayson 69' | | J.Eckhardt (red card) 47' | Stadium: Sixfields Stadium; Attendance: 4,416 |

| 18 January 1997 28 | Northampton Town | 5–1 | Chester City | Northampton |
| 15:00 GMT | M.Rush 21'; M.Cooper 24'; R.Warburton 45'; I.Sampson 48'; N.Grayson 82' | | K.Noteman 28' | Stadium: Sixfields Stadium; Attendance: 4,434 |

| 25 January 1997 29 | Northampton Town | 3–0 | Hartlepool United | Northampton |
| 15:00 GMT | N.Grayson 44', 45', 48' | | | Stadium: Sixfields Stadium; Attendance: 5,093 |

| 1 February 1997 30 | Carlisle United | 2–1 | Northampton Town | Carlisle |
| 15:00 GMT | P.Conway 47', 60' | | I.Clarkson (red card) 59'; C.Lee 77' | Stadium: Brunton Park; Attendance: 5,271 |

| 8 February 1997 31 | Northampton Town | 1–2 | Swansea City | Northampton |
| 15:00 GMT | C.Lee 59' | | P.Brayson 23'; D.Penney 85' (pen.) | Stadium: Sixfields Stadium; Attendance: 6,178 |

| 15 February 1997 32 | Rochdale | 1–1 | Northampton Town | Rochdale |
| 15:00 GMT | J.Deary 44' | | M.Rush 9' | Stadium: Spotland Stadium; Attendance: 1,988 |

| 22 February 1997 33 | Northampton Town | 2–0 | Doncaster Rovers | Northampton |
| 15:00 GMT | M.Cooper 12'; N.Grayson 41' | | | Stadium: Sixfields Stadium; Attendance: 4,577 |

| 1 March 1997 34 | Hull City | 1–1 | Northampton Town | Kingston upon Hull |
| 15:00 GMT | D.Darby 24' | | R.Dewhurst 74' (o.g.) | Stadium: Boothferry Park; Attendance: 3,495 |

| 4 March 1997 35 | Brighton & Hove Albion | 2–1 | Northampton Town | Hove |
| 19:45 GMT | R.Reinelt 23'; J.Peake 81' | | D.Peer 89' | Stadium: Goldstone Ground; Attendance: 4,943 |

| 8 March 1997 36 | Hereford United | 1–2 | Northampton Town | Hereford |
| 15:00 GMT | J.Williams (red card) 54'; A.Foster 90' | | S.Parrish 9'; C.Lee 13' | Stadium: Edgar Street; Attendance: 8,043 |

| 15 March 1997 37 | Northampton Town | 1–1 | Lincoln City | Northampton |
| 15:00 GMT | R.Hunter 90' (pen.) | | S.Holmes 65' | Stadium: Sixfields Stadium; Attendance: 5,266 |

| 22 March 1997 38 | Mansfield Town | 1–0 | Northampton Town | Mansfield |
| 15:00 GMT | S.Eustace 83' | | | Stadium: Field Mill; Attendance: 2,596 |

| 29 March 1997 39 | Northampton Town | 0–1 | Wigan Athletic | Northampton |
| 15:00 GMT | | | D.Lowe 90' | Stadium: Sixfields Stadium; Attendance: 5,914 |

| 31 March 1997 40 | Torquay United | 1–2 | Northampton Town | Torquay |
| 15:00 BST | R.Jack 28' | | S.Parrish 17'; I.Sampson 19' | Stadium: Plainmoor; Attendance: 2,336 |

| 5 April 1997 41 | Northampton Town | 1–0 | Scarborough | Northampton |
| 15:00 BST | R.Hunter 54' (pen.) | | | Stadium: Sixfields Stadium; Attendance: 4,854 |

| 8 April 1997 42 | Cambridge United | 0–0 | Northampton Town | Cambridge |
| 19:45 BST | | | | Stadium: Abbey Stadium; Attendance: 4,412 |

| 12 April 1997 43 | Fulham | 0–1 | Northampton Town | Fulham, London |
| 15:00 BST | | | J.White 7' | Stadium: Craven Cottage; Attendance: 11,419 |

| 19 April 1997 44 | Northampton Town | 4–1 | Exeter City | Northampton |
| 15:00 BST | S.Parrish 44'; M.Cooper 47', 53'; J.Gayle 71' | | D.Rowbotham 90' (pen.) | Stadium: Sixfields Stadium; Attendance: 6,400 |

| 26 April 1997 45 | Colchester United | 0–0 | Northampton Town | Colchester |
| 15:00 BST | | Report | | Stadium: Layer Road; Attendance: 5,956; Referee: Paul Rejer |

| 3 May 1997 46 | Northampton Town | 1–0 | Scunthorpe United | Northampton |
| 15:00 BST | S.Parrish 74' | | | Stadium: Sixfields Stadium; Attendance: 6,828 |

==== Play-offs ====
| 11 May 1997 Semi-final 1st Leg | Cardiff City | 0–1 | Northampton Town | Cardiff, Wales |
| 12:00 BST | | | M.Cooper (red card) 70'; S.Parrish 77' | Stadium: Ninian Park; Attendance: 11,369; Referee: John Kirkby |

| 14 May 1997 Semi-final 2nd Leg | Northampton Town | 3–2 (4–2 agg.) | Cardiff City | Northampton |
| 19:45 BST | I.Sampson 23'; R.Warburton 68'; J.Gayle 77' | | J.Eckhardt (red card) 25'; J.Fowler 36'; S.Haworth 90' | Stadium: Sixfields Stadium; Attendance: 7,302; Referee: Uriah Rennie |

| 24 May 1997 Final | Northampton Town | 1–0 | Swansea City | London |
| 15:00 BST | J.Frain 90' | | | Stadium: Wembley Stadium; Attendance: 46,804; Referee: Terry Heilbron |

=== FA Cup ===
| 17 November 1996 First round | Northampton Town | 0–1 | Watford | Northampton |
| 13:00 GMT | D.Rowbotham 32' | | D.Bazeley 71' | Stadium: Sixfields Stadium; Attendance: 7,342 |

=== League Cup ===
| 20 August 1996 First round 1st leg | Cardiff City | 1–0 | Northampton Town | Cardiff |
| 19:30 BST | C.Dale 54' | | | Stadium: Ninian Park; Attendance: 2,294 |

| 3 September 1996 First round 2nd leg | Northampton Town | 2–0 | Cardiff City | Northampton |
| 19:45 BST | M.Cooper (red card) 21'; C.Lee 62', 78' | | | Stadium: Sixfields Stadium; Attendance: 3,567 |

| 18 September 1996 Second round 1st leg | Stoke City | 1–0 | Northampton Town | Stoke-on-Trent |
| 19:45 BST | N.Worthington 50' | | | Stadium: Victoria Ground; Attendance: 6,093 |

| 24 September 1996 Second round 2nd leg | Northampton Town | 1–2 (a.e.t.) | Stoke City | Northampton |
| 19:45 BST | J.Gayle o.g.' | | M.Sheron 100', 108' | Stadium: Sixfields Stadium; Attendance: 5,088 |

=== League Trophy ===
| 4 February 1997 Second round | Northampton Town | 1–0 | Luton Town | Northampton |
| 19:45 GMT | M.Rush | | | Stadium: Sixfields Stadium; Attendance: 4,201 |

| 11 February 1997 Quarter-final | Plymouth Argyle | 1–2 | Northampton Town | Plymouth |
| 19:45 GMT | | | D.Martin; J.Gayle | Stadium: Home Park; Attendance: 1,499 |

| 18 February 1997 Semi-final | Colchester United | 2–1 | Northampton Town | Colchester |
| 19:45 GMT | J.Vaughan (red card) 22'; D.Greene 66'; P.Buckle 75' | Report | D.Martin 67' | Stadium: Layer Road; Attendance: 3,975; Referee: Neale Barry |

=== Appearances, goals and cards ===
| Pos | Player | Division Three | | | FA Cup | | | League Cup | | | League Trophy | | | Play-offs | | | Total | | | Discipline | |
| Pos | Player | Starts | Sub | Goals | Starts | Sub | Goals | Starts | Sub | Goals | Starts | Sub | Goals | Starts | Sub | Goals | Starts | Sub | Goals | Booked | Sent off (straight red) |
|---|---|---|---|---|---|---|---|---|---|---|---|---|---|---|---|---|---|---|---|---|---|
| GK | Stuart Brock | – | – | – | – | – | – | – | – | – | – | – | – | – | – | – | – | – | – | – | – |
| GK | Billy Turley | 1 | – | – | – | – | – | – | – | – | – | – | – | – | – | – | 1 | – | – | – | – |
| GK | Andy Woodman | 45 | – | – | 1 | – | – | 4 | – | – | 3 | – | – | 3 | – | – | 56 | – | – | 1 | – |
| DF | Ian Clarkson | 45 | – | – | 1 | – | – | 4 | – | – | 3 | – | – | 3 | – | – | 56 | – | – | 8 | 1 |
| DF | Lee Colkin | 1 | 5 | – | – | 1 | – | 1 | 3 | – | – | 2 | – | – | – | – | 2 | 11 | – | – | – |
| DF | John Frain | 11 | – | – | – | – | – | – | – | – | 3 | – | – | 3 | – | 1 | 17 | – | 1 | 2 | – |
| DF | Lee Maddison | 34 | 1 | – | 1 | – | – | 3 | 1 | – | 2 | – | – | – | – | – | 40 | 1 | – | 5 | – |
| DF | David Rennie | 42 | 1 | 4 | – | – | – | 4 | – | – | 2 | – | – | 3 | – | – | 51 | 1 | 4 | 2 | – |
| DF | Ian Sampson | 43 | – | 4 | 1 | – | – | 4 | – | – | 3 | – | – | 3 | – | 1 | 54 | – | 5 | 11 | – |
| DF | Ray Warburton | 35 | – | 4 | 1 | – | – | – | – | – | 3 | – | – | 3 | – | 1 | 42 | – | 5 | 1 | – |
| MF | Ali Gibb | 6 | 12 | 1 | – | – | – | 3 | 1 | – | – | – | – | – | 1 | – | 9 | 14 | 1 | 1 | – |
| MF | Roy Hunter | 26 | 10 | 6 | 1 | – | – | 4 | – | – | 1 | – | – | 3 | – | – | 35 | 10 | 6 | 6 | – |
| MF | Dave Martin | 10 | 2 | – | – | – | – | – | – | – | 2 | – | 2 | – | – | – | 12 | 2 | 2 | 1 | – |
| MF | Danny O'Shea | 32 | 3 | – | 1 | – | – | 4 | – | – | 1 | 1 | – | – | – | – | 38 | 4 | – | 4 | 1 |
| MF | Sean Parrish | 37 | 2 | 8 | 1 | – | – | 3 | 1 | – | – | – | – | 3 | – | 1 | 44 | 3 | 9 | 11 | – |
| MF | Dean Peer | 7 | 14 | 1 | – | – | – | 1 | 1 | – | 1 | 1 | – | – | 3 | – | 9 | 19 | 1 | 1 | 1 |
| MF | Michael Warner | 1 | 8 | – | – | 1 | – | – | – | – | 1 | – | – | – | – | – | 2 | 9 | – | – | – |
| FW | Mark Cooper | 37 | 4 | 10 | 1 | – | – | 3 | – | – | – | – | – | 1 | – | – | 42 | 4 | 10 | 7 | 2 |
| FW | Claudio De Vito | – | – | – | – | – | – | – | – | – | – | – | – | – | – | – | – | – | – | – | – |
| FW | John Gayle | 7 | 2 | 1 | – | – | – | – | – | – | 2 | – | 1 | 3 | – | 1 | 12 | 2 | 3 | 3 | – |
| FW | Neil Grayson | 38 | 8 | 12 | 1 | – | – | 3 | 1 | – | 2 | – | – | 3 | – | – | 47 | 9 | 12 | 6 | – |
| FW | Christian Lee | 12 | 17 | 7 | – | 1 | – | 1 | – | 2 | 2 | – | – | 1 | 2 | – | 16 | 20 | 9 | 1 | – |
| FW | Garry Thompson | – | 1 | – | – | – | – | – | – | – | – | – | – | – | – | – | – | 1 | – | – | – |
| FW | Jason White | 16 | 16 | 2 | 1 | – | – | 1 | 3 | – | 1 | 1 | – | 1 | 1 | – | 20 | 21 | 2 | 1 | – |
Players who left before end of season:
| DF | Ryan Kirby | – | 1 | – | – | – | – | – | – | – | – | – | – | – | – | – | – | 1 | – | – | – |
| MF | Chris Burns | 6 | – | – | – | – | – | 1 | – | – | – | – | – | – | – | – | 7 | – | – | 1 | – |
| W | Neil Lyne | 1 | – | – | – | – | – | – | – | – | – | – | – | – | – | – | 1 | – | – | 1 | – |
| W | Matthew Rush | 14 | – | 3 | – | – | – | – | – | – | 1 | – | 1 | – | – | – | 15 | – | 4 | 1 | – |
| FW | Allan Smart | 1 | – | – | – | – | – | – | – | – | – | – | – | – | – | – | 1 | – | – | – | – |
| FW | Phil Stant | 4 | 1 | 2 | – | – | – | – | – | – | – | – | – | – | – | – | 4 | 1 | 2 | – | – |
