= 1997 Football League Third Division play-off final =

Association football match

Northampton Town	Swansea City
1	0
- Date: 24 May 1997
- Venue: Wembley Stadium, London
- Referee: Terry Heilbron (Newton Aycliffe)
- Attendance: 46,804

The 1997 Football League Third Division play-off final was an association football match which was played on 24 May 1997 at Wembley Stadium, London, between Northampton Town and Swansea City to determine the fourth and final team to gain promotion from the Football League Third Division to the Second Division. The top three teams of the 1996–97 Football League Third Division, Carlisle United, Fulham and league winners Wigan Athletic, gained automatic promotion to the Second Division, while the teams placed from fourth to seventh in the table took part in play-offs. The winners of the play-off semi-finals competed for the final place for the 1997–98 season in the Second Division. The losing semi-finalists were Chester City and Cardiff City.

The match, refereed by Terry Heilbron, was played in front of 46,804 supporters. In a goalless first half, Carl Heggs came close to scoring with a volley which Andy Woodman, the Northampton Town goalkeeper, saved. Late in the second half, Northampton Town were awarded a free kick which John Frain struck against the Swansea wall, but the referee ordered it be re-taken. On the second attempt, Frain scored to give his side a 1–0 victory and promotion to the Second Division.

In their next season, Northampton Town finished in fourth place in the Second Division to qualify for the play-offs. There, they lost 1–0 to Grimsby Town in the 1998 Football League Second Division play-off final. Swansea City ended their following season in 21st position in the Third Division.

== Route to the final ==
Football League Third Division final table, leading positions
Pos	Team	Pld	W	D	L	GF	GA	GD	Pts
1	Wigan Athletic	46	26	9	11	84	51	+33	87
2	Fulham	46	25	12	9	72	38	+34	87
3	Carlisle United	46	24	12	10	67	44	+23	84
4	Northampton Town	46	20	12	14	67	44	+23	72
5	Swansea City	46	21	8	17	62	58	+4	71
6	Chester City	46	18	16	12	55	43	+12	70
7	Cardiff City	46	20	9	17	57	55	+2	69

Northampton Town finished the regular 1996–97 season in fourth position in the Football League Third Division, the fourth tier of the English football league system, one place and one point ahead of Swansea City. Both therefore missed out on the three automatic places for promotion to the Second Division and instead took part in the play-offs to determine the fourth promoted team. Northampton Town finished twelve points behind Carlisle United (who were promoted in third place), and fifteen behind second-placed Fulham and league winners Wigan Athletic (who had superior goal difference to Fulham).

In their play-off semi-final, Northampton Town faced Cardiff City, with the first match of the two-legged tie taking place at Ninian Park in Cardiff on 11 May 1997. After a goalless first half, Northampton Town were reduced to ten players when Mark Cooper was sent off for violent conduct with 20 minutes of the match remaining. Seven minutes later, Sean Parrish scored with a lob from the edge of the Cardiff City penalty area to give Northampton Town a 1–0 victory. The second leg was held at Sixfields Stadium in Northampton three days later. Ian Sampson put Northampton Town ahead midway through the first half with a header and three minutes later, Cardiff's Jeff Eckhardt was sent off for the use of an elbow. Jason Fowler scored for Cardiff in the 36th minute before goals from Ray Warburton and John Gayle made it 3–1. Simon Haworth scored a late goal for Cardiff but the match ended 3–2 to Northampton Town who progressed to the final with a 4–2 aggregate victory.

Swansea City's opposition in their play-off semi-final was Chester City with the first leg being held at the Deva Stadium in Chester on 11 May 1997. The match was ill-disciplined with nine players being booked. David Flitcroft had a goal disallowed for offside and the match ended in a 0–0 draw. The second leg took place at Vetch Field in Swansea three days later. In the eighth minute, Swansea's defender Steve Jones broke his right leg and was taken away in an ambulance, shortly before Chester's Chris Priest was dismissed for two yellow cards. Swansea scored twice in first-half stoppage time, with goals from Dave Thomas and Steve Torpey. Carl Heggs extended Swansea's lead when he scored with a left-footed volley in the 62nd minute, and the match ended 3–0, with the Welsh team progressing to the final with the same aggregate score.

== Match ==
=== Background ===
This was Swansea City's second appearance in a play-off final, having won the 1988 Football League Fourth Division play-off final 5–4 on aggregate against Torquay United. They had played in the fourth tier of English football since being relegated in the 1989–90 season. It was their second competitive match at Wembley Stadium, having made their debut at the national stadium three years before where they won the 1994 Football League Trophy Final in a penalty shoot-out against Huddersfield Town. Northampton Town were appearing in the first play-off final in their history, and had also played in the fourth tier since suffering relegation in the 1989–90 season. It was also their first match at the national stadium.

In the two matches between the sides during the regular season, Swansea City won both: a 1–0 victory at Vetch Field in November 1996 was followed by a 2–1 win at Sixfields the following February. Dave Penney was Swansea City's top scorer during the regular season with 13 goals (all in the league). Northampton Town's leading scorer was Neil Grayson who had scored 12 league goals during the season. The referee for the match was Terry Heilbron from Newton Aycliffe.

=== Summary ===
The match kicked off around 3 p.m. on 24 May 1997 at Wembley Stadium in front of a crowd of 46,804. Five minutes into the match, a volley from Swansea's Heggs was tipped over the crossbar by Andy Woodman, the Northampton Town goalkeeper. In the 25th minute, Jan Mølby conceded possession to Northampton's Grayson who passed to Parrish, but Christian Edwards blocked his shot. Early in the second half, John Frain crossed for Christian Lee but his header was off-target. Later in the half, Frain crossed for Gayle whose header just clipped the Swansea crossbar. Soon after, Northampton Town were awarded a free kick on the edge of the Swansea penalty area. Frain struck the ball into the wall but the referee adjudged that the defenders had encroached and ordered the free kick be retaken. On the second attempt, and in second-half stoppage time, Frain's shot found its way into the back of the Swansea goal, giving Northampton a 1–0 lead which they held onto for the last seconds to secure victory and promotion to the Second Division.

=== Details ===
24 May 1997
15:00 BST

Northampton Town	1–0	Swansea City
Frain 90'	Report

Wembley Stadium, London
Attendance: 46,804
Referee: Terry Heilbron

Northampton Town	Swansea City

GK	1	Andy Woodman
CB	6	David Rennie		(substituted off) 40'
CB	5	Ray Warburton
CB	4	Ian Sampson
RWB	2	Ian Clarkson	Booked
LWB	3	John Frain
CM	11	Roy Hunter	Booked
CM	7	Sean Parrish
FW	10	Christian Lee
FW	9	John Gayle	(yellow card) (substituted off) 76'
FW	8	Neil Grayson	Booked
Substitutes:
MF	27	Dean Peer		(substituted on) 40'
MF	14	Ali Gibb
FW	12	Jason White		(substituted on) 76'
Manager:
Ian Atkins

GK	1	Roger Freestone
DF	8	Dave Penney
DF	5	Christian Edwards
DF	4	Keith Walker
DF	3	João Moreira
MF	6	Kwame Ampadu	Booked
MF	10	Jan Mølby
MF	11	Jonathan Coates	Booked
FW	9	Steve Torpey
FW	7	Carl Heggs
FW	2	Dai Thomas	Booked	(substituted off) 83'
Substitutes:
FW	12	Linton Brown		(substituted on) 83'
MF	15	Shaun Chapple
DF	14	Ryan Casey
Manager:
Jan Mølby

== Post-match ==
Swansea City's player-manager Mølby was critical of the referee's decision to allow the decisive free kick to be retaken, suggesting "if they hadn't scored from the second [free kick], the referee would have let them take it again ... There is no crueller way to lose at Wembley than that." Winning goalscorer Frain was elated, recounting that "six months ago I was rotting away in Birmingham's reserves. Now I've scored a last minute winner at Wembley, the stuff you dream about when you are kicking a ball in a park as a little kid." Northampton Town's manager Ian Atkins reflected on his club's recent history, noting "The club was in a state of despair when I arrived and we have gone through a lot in recent years" but that now the "whole town has gone barmy!"

In their next season, Northampton Town finished in fourth place in the Second Division to qualify for the play-offs. There, they lost 1–0 to Grimsby Town in the 1998 Football League Second Division play-off final. Mølby was dismissed from his position the following October with his side fifth from bottom. Micky Adams replaced Mølby temporarily and two weeks later Alan Cork was appointed as the full-time manager: he led Swansea to 21st position in the Third Division that season.
