= 1996–97 Cardiff City F.C. season =

Welsh football club season

Cardiff City
1996–97 season
- Owner: Samesh Kumar
- Manager: Phil Neal/Russell Osman/Kenny Hibbitt
- Football League Third Division: 7th
- FA Cup: 2nd round
- League Cup: 1st round
- Auto Windscreens Shield: 2nd round
- Top goalscorer: League: Steve White (13); All: Steve White (14)
- Highest home attendance: 6,144 (v Fulham, 9 November 1996)
- Lowest home attendance: 1,667 (v Darlington, 15 October 1996)
- Average home league attendance: 3,594

The 1996–97 season was Cardiff City F.C.'s 70th season in the Football League. They competed in the 24-team Division Three, then the fourth tier of English football, finishing seventh, before being beaten 4–2 on aggregate by Northampton Town in the play-offs.

The season saw Cardiff sack two managers during the course of the year. Phil Neal continued in his role from the previous season before leaving the club, taking the role of assistant manager at Manchester City, and was replaced by Russell Osman. However Osman himself lasted just five matches and was replaced by Kenny Hibbitt, the man who had made way for Phil Neal the previous season.

== Players ==
Note: Flags indicate national team as defined under FIFA eligibility rules; some limited exceptions apply. Players may hold more than one non-FIFA nationality.

No.	Pos.	Nation	Player
--	GK	ENG	Tony Elliott
--	GK	WAL	Pat Mountain
--	GK	WAL	Steve Williams
--	DF	WAL	Lee Baddeley
--	DF	WAL	Gareth Davies
--	DF	ENG	Jeff Eckhardt
--	DF	ENG	Hayden Fleming
--	DF	WAL	Lee Jarman
--	DF	WAL	Kevin Lloyd
--	DF	WAL	Jason Perry
--	DF	WAL	Lee Phillips
--	DF	ENG	Ian Rodgerson
--	DF	ENG	Jimmy Rollo
--	DF	ENG	Andy Scott
--	DF	WAL	Scott Young
--	MF	ENG	Mickey Bennett

No.	Pos.	Nation	Player
--	MF	ENG	Stacy Coldicott
--	MF	ENG	Jason Fowler
--	MF	SCO	Jimmy Gardner
--	MF	SCO	Ray McStay
--	MF	WAL	Jamie Michael
--	MF	ENG	Craig Middleton
--	MF	IRL	Keith O'Halloran
--	MF	ENG	Gareth Stoker
--	MF	ENG	Paul Ware
--	FW	WAL	Carl Dale
--	FW	ENG	Steve Flack
--	FW	WAL	Simon Haworth
--	FW	ENG	Scott Partridge
--	FW	ENG	Tony Philliskirk
--	FW	ENG	Steve White

First team squad.

== League standings ==
Pos	Team	Pld	W	D	L	GF	GA	GD	Pts	Promotion or relegation
5	Swansea City	46	21	8	17	62	58	+4	71	Qualification for the Third Division play-offs
6	Chester City	46	18	16	12	55	43	+12	70	Qualification for the Third Division play-offs
7	Cardiff City	46	20	9	17	56	54	+2	69	Qualification for the Third Division play-offs
8	Colchester United	46	17	17	12	62	51	+11	68	
9	Lincoln City	46	18	12	16	70	69	+1	66	

Rules for classification: In the Football League goals scored (GF) takes precedence over goal difference (GD).

=== Results by round ===
Round	1	2	3	4	5	6	7	8	9	10	11	12	13	14	15	16	17	18	19	20	21	22	23	24	25	26	27	28	29	30	31	32	33	34	35	36	37	38	39	40	41	42	43	44	45	46
Ground	A	H	H	A	H	A	A	H	A	H	H	A	H	A	A	H	H	H	A	A	H	H	H	A	A	H	A	H	A	H	A	A	H	A	A	H	H	A	A	H	A	H	H	A	H	A
Result	D	W	L	W	W	L	W	D	L	L	W	W	W	D	D	W	L	W	W	L	L	L	W	L	L	L	L	W	W	L	W	D	W	W	W	L	D	L	W	D	D	W	D	L	W	L
Position	~	7	15	6	5	9	5	7	8	15	11	10	7	7	8	7	7	5	5	5	5	9	6	7	7	7	13	11	8	11	8	9	9	7	7	7	7	8	6	7	7	6	5	7	7	7
Points	1	4	4	7	10	10	13	14	14	14	17	20	23	24	25	28	28	31	34	34	34	34	37	37	37	37	37	40	43	43	46	47	50	53	56	56	57	57	60	61	62	65	66	66	69	69

A = Away; H = Home; W = Win; D = Draw; L = Loss

== Fixtures and results ==
=== Third Division ===
17 August 1996 1	Scarborough	0–0	Cardiff City	Scarborough
				Stadium: Athletic Ground; Attendance: 2,455

24 August 1996 2	Cardiff City	1–0	Brighton & Hove Albion	Cardiff
15:00	Jeff Eckhardt 43'			Stadium: Ninian Park; Attendance: 3,897

27 August 1996 3	Cardiff City	0–2	Wigan Athletic	Cardiff
19:30			34' Graeme Jones; 81' Ian Kilford	Stadium: Ninian Park; Attendance: 3,845

31 August 1996 4	Cambridge United	0–2	Cardiff City	Cambridge
			9', 37' Steve White	Stadium: Abbey Stadium; Attendance: 2,478

7 September 1996 5	Cardiff City	2–1	Exeter City	Cardiff
15:00	Steve White 13', 68'		21' (pen.) Mark Chamberlain	Stadium: Ninian Park; Attendance: 3,659

10 September 1996 6	Torquay United	2–0	Cardiff City	Torquay
	Jon Gittens 24'; Jamie Ndah 45'			Stadium: Plainmoor; Attendance: 2,041

14 September 1996 7	Scunthorpe United	0–1	Cardiff City	Scunthorpe
			47' Craig Middleton	Stadium: Old Show Ground; Attendance: 2,121

21 September 1996 8	Cardiff City	2–2	Northampton Town	Cardiff
15:00	Tony Philliskirk 18'; Craig Middleton 83'		87' Mark Cooper; 89' (pen.) Roy Hunter	Stadium: Ninian Park; Attendance: 4,124

28 September 1996 9	Lincoln City	2–0	Cardiff City	Lincoln
	Colin Alcide 18'; John Taylor 87'			Stadium: Sincil Bank; Attendance: 2,925

12 October 1996 10	Cardiff City	1–2	Barnet	Cardiff
15:00	Craig Middleton 26'		17' Gary Brazil; 86' Sean Devine	Stadium: Ninian Park; Attendance: 2,879

15 October 1996 11	Cardiff City	2–0	Darlington	Cardiff
19:30	Carl Dale 3'; Steve White 41'			Stadium: Ninian Park; Attendance: 1,667

19 October 1996 12	Carlisle United	0–2	Cardiff City	Carlisle
			49' Carl Dale; 81' Jason Fowler	Stadium: Brunton Park; Attendance: 4,972

26 October 1996 13	Cardiff City	3–0	Leyton Orient	Cardiff
15:00	Steve White 22' (pen.); Jimmy Gardner 28'; Carl Dale 36'			Stadium: Ninian Park; Attendance: 3,647

29 October 1996 14	Hull City	1–1	Cardiff City	Hull
	Kenny Gilbert 79'		15' Craig Middleton	Stadium: Boothferry Park; Attendance: 2,775

2 November 1996 15	Colchester United	1–1	Cardiff City	Colchester
	Karl Duguid 18'		57' (pen.) Steve White	Stadium: Layer Road; Attendance: 3,213; Referee: Rob Harris (Oxfordshire)

5 November 1996 16	Cardiff City	2–1	Rochdale	Cardiff
19:30	Mickey Bennett 45'; Jeff Eckhardt 67'		52' Steve Whitehall	Stadium: Ninian Park; Attendance: 2,835

9 November 1996 17	Cardiff City	1–2	Fulham	Cardiff
15:00	Steve White 89'		1' Mike Conroy; 34' (pen.) Mark Blake	Stadium: Ninian Park; Attendance: 6,144

23 November 1996 18	Cardiff City	2–0	Hereford United	Cardiff
15:00	Steve White 55', 75'			Stadium: Ninian Park; Attendance: 3,904

26 November 1996 19	Chester City	0–1	Cardiff City	Chester
			85' Scott Young	Stadium: Deva Stadium; Attendance: 1,540

30 November 1996 20	Leyton Orient	3–0	Cardiff City	Leyton Orient
	Carl Griffiths 34'; Scott McGleish 57'; Andy Arnott 64'			Stadium: Brisbane Road; Attendance: 4,512

3 December 1996 21	Cardiff City	1–3	Swansea City	Cardiff
19:30	Steve White 45'		11' Kwame Ampadu; 37' Steve Jones; 86' Dai Thomas	Stadium: Ninian Park; Attendance: 3,721

21 December 1996 22	Cardiff City	1–2	Mansfield Town	Cardiff
15:00	Jeff Eckhardt 25'		49', 58' Mark Sale	Stadium: Ninian Park; Attendance: 2,238

26 December 1996 23	Cardiff City	2–0	Torquay United	Cardiff
15:00	Deon Burton 38', 77'			Stadium: Ninian Park; Attendance: 3,651

28 December 1996 24	Exeter City	2–0	Cardiff City	Exeter
	Noel Blake 39'; Darren Rowbotham 55'			Stadium: St James Park; Attendance: 3,585

1 January 1997 25	Northampton Town	4–0	Cardiff City	Northampton
15:00	Ray Warburton 16'; Lee Jarman 42' (o.g.); Mark Cooper 54'; Neil Grayson 89'		(red card) 47' Jeff Eckhardt	Stadium: Sixfields Stadium; Attendance: 4,416

11 January 1997 26	Cardiff City	1–3	Lincoln City	Cardiff
15:00	Jason Fowler 11'		18' Phil Stant; 51' (o.g.) Jason Perry; 67' Gareth Ainsworth	Stadium: Ninian Park; Attendance: 2,033

18 January 1997 27	Rochdale	1–0	Cardiff City	Rochdale
	Mark Leonard 7'			Stadium: Spotland; Attendance: 1,704; Referee: Uriah Rennie (Sheffield)

25 January 1997 28	Cardiff City	2–0	Hull City	Cardiff
15:00	Simon Haworth 34'; Jeff Eckhardt 75'			Stadium: Ninian Park; Attendance: 2,328

31 January 1997 29	Fulham	1–4	Cardiff City	Fulham
	Jeff Eckhardt 55' (o.g.)		29' Jason Fowler; 46', 85' Steve White; 51' Simon Haworth	Stadium: Craven Cottage; Attendance: 6,459

8 February 1997 30	Cardiff City	1–2	Colchester United	Cardiff
15:00	Simon Haworth 90'		6' Tony Adcock; 20' Steve Whitton	Stadium: Ninian Park; Attendance: 3,912; Referee: Gurnum Singh

11 February 1997 31	Hartlepool United	2–3	Cardiff City	Hartlepool
	Chris Beech 51', 57'		32' Jason Fowler; 67' Jeff Eckhardt; 78' Gareth Stoker	Stadium: Victoria Park; Attendance: 1,120

16 February 1997 32	Hereford United	1–1	Cardiff City	Hereford
	Adrian Foster 31'		36' Gareth Stoker	Stadium: Edgar Street; Attendance: 5,137

22 February 1997 33	Cardiff City	2–0	Hartlepool United	Cardiff
15:00	Simon Haworth 21'; Gareth Davies 35'			Stadium: Ninian Park; Attendance: 2,971

2 March 1997 34	Swansea City	0–1	Cardiff City	Swansea
			18' Simon Haworth	Stadium: Vetch Field; Attendance: 4,430

8 March 1997 35	Mansfield Town	1–3	Cardiff City	Mansfield
	Warren Hackett 54'		28' Simon Haworth; 64' Gareth Stoker; 76' Carl Dale	Stadium: Field Mill; Attendance: 2,569

14 March 1997 36	Cardiff City	0–2	Doncaster Rovers	Cardiff
19:30			7' Darren Moore; 62' Darren Utley	Stadium: Ninian Park; Attendance: 5,347

18 March 1997 37	Cardiff City	1–1	Scarborough	Cardiff
19:30	Gareth Davies 57'		60' Craig Midgley	Stadium: Ninian Park; Attendance: 2,823

22 March 1997 38	Brighton & Hove Albion	2–0	Cardiff City	Brighton
	Paul McDonald 16' (pen.); Ian Baird 44'			Stadium: Goldstone Ground; Attendance: 9,683

31 March 1997 39	Wigan Athletic	0–1	Cardiff City	Wigan
			56' Simon Haworth	Stadium: Springfield Park (Wigan); Attendance: 4,634

5 April 1997 40	Cardiff City	0–0	Cambridge United	Cardiff
15:00				Stadium: Ninian Park; Attendance: 3,410

8 April 1997 41	Doncaster Rovers	3–3	Cardiff City	Doncaster
	Darren Moore 75'; John Schofield 80'; Ian Gore 89'		32', 88' Simon Haworth; 60' Jason Fowler	Stadium: Belle Vue; Attendance: 1,989

12 April 1997 42	Cardiff City	1–0	Chester City	Cardiff
15:00	Carl Dale 34'			Stadium: Ninian Park; Attendance: 4,079

15 April 1997 43	Cardiff City	0–0	Scunthorpe United	Cardiff
19:30				Stadium: Ninian Park; Attendance: 4,442

19 April 1997 44	Barnet	3–1	Cardiff City	Chipping Barnet
	Dean Samuels 24'; Shaun Gale 59'; Craig Middleton 69' (o.g.)		85' Carl Dale	Stadium: Underhill Stadium; Attendance: 2,497

26 April 1997 45	Cardiff City	2–0	Carlisle United	Cardiff
15:00	Carl Dale 20' (pen.); Kevin Lloyd 37'			Stadium: Ninian Park; Attendance: 5,104

3 May 1997 46	Darlington	2–1	Cardiff City	Darlington
	Carl Shutt 47'; Darren Roberts 78'		77' Carl Dale	Stadium: Feethams; Attendance: 3,686

=== Third Division Play Offs ===
11 May 1997 Semi Final (First leg)	Cardiff City	0–1	Northampton Town	Cardiff
12:00			(red card) 70' Mark Cooper; 77' Sean Parrish	Stadium: Ninian Park; Attendance: 11,369; Referee: John Kirby (Sheffield)

14 May 1997 Semi Final (Second leg)	Northampton Town	3–2	Cardiff City	Northampton
19:45	Ian Sampson 23'; Ray Warburton 68'; John Gayle 77'		(red card) 25' Jeff Eckhardt; 36' Jason Fowler; 90' Simon Haworth	Stadium: Sixfields Stadium; Attendance: 7,302; Referee: Uriah Rennie (Sheffield)

=== League Cup ===
20 August 1996 Round 1 (First leg)	Cardiff City	1–0	Northampton Town	Cardiff
19:30	Carl Dale 54'			Stadium: Ninian Park; Attendance: 2,294

2 September 1996 Round 1 (Second leg)	Northampton Town	2–0 (2–1 agg.)	Cardiff City	Northampton
19:45	(red card) 21' Mark Cooper; Christian Lee 62', 78'			Stadium: Sixfields Stadium; Attendance: 3,567

=== FA Cup ===
16 November 1996 Round 1	Cardiff City	2–0	Hendon	Cardiff
15:00	Steve White 31'; Craig Middleton 88'			Stadium: Ninian Park; Attendance: 2,592

7 December 1996 Round 2	Cardiff City	0–2	Gillingham	Cardiff
18:00		Gillingham report	18' Iffy Onoura; 66' Andy Hessenthaler	Stadium: Ninian Park; Attendance: 3,474; Referee: Paul Danson (Leicester)

=== Auto Windscreens Shield ===
10 December 1996 Round 1	Gillingham	1–2 (a.e.t.)	Cardiff City	Gillingham
19:45	Lenny Piper 50'	Gillingham report	90' Jeff Eckhardt; 112' Carl Dale	Stadium: Priestfield Stadium; Attendance: 1,193; Referee: Carl Finch (Bury St Edmonds)
Note: game ended with a Golden goal

14 January 1997 Round 2	Cardiff City	1–1 (a.e.t.) (2–4 p)	Exeter City	Cardiff
19:30	Carl Dale 89'		74' Darren Rowbotham	Stadium: Ninian Park; Attendance: 793; Referee: Mick Pierce (Portsmouth)

== See also ==
- List of Cardiff City F.C. seasons

== Bibliography ==
- Hayes, Dean (2006). The Who's Who of Cardiff City. Breedon Books. ISBN 1-85983-462-0.
- Shepherd, Richard (2002). The Definitive Cardiff City F.C. Tony Brown. ISBN 1-899-46817-X.
- Crooks, John (1992). Cardiff City Football Club: Official History of the Bluebirds. Yore Publications. ISBN 0-9513321-8-X.
- Rollin, Jack, ed. (1997). Rothmans Football Yearbook 1997-98. Headline Book Publishing. ISBN 0-7472-7738-9.
- "Football Club History Database – Cardiff City".
- Welsh Football Data Archive
