= List of Northampton Town F.C. managers =

Northampton Town Football Club is an English association football club based in Northampton, England. The club was founded on 6 March 1897 by a group of local school teachers who got together with the local solicitor A.J "Pat" Darnell at The Princess Royal Inn, Wellingborough Road to form the town's first professional football club. Their initially chosen name was Northampton Football Club, but after objections from the town's rugby club, the club was called Northampton Town Football Club.

Northampton Town have had 35 managers appointed to the role on a permanent basis and a further four have taken the position in a caretaker role. The vast majority have been English. In 2017, former Dutch player Jimmy Floyd Hasselbaink became the first person from outside the British Isles to manage the club. A majority of the managerial changes have taken place in recent years including fifteen between 2001 and 2021.

Dave Bowen is the club's most successful manager so far, taking the club to the First Division for the only time. Herbert Chapman was in charge during the Cobblers's crown of the Southern Football League in 1908–09 and also the runners-up spot in the Charity Shield that proceeded the title.

== List of managers ==
As of 18 May 2026

Name	Nationality	From	To	P	W	D	L	Win %	Honours	Notes	Ref
Herbert Chapman	England	April 1907	May 1912	212	106	44	62	50%	Southern League winners: 1908–09; Charity Shield runners-up: 1909–10; Southern League runners-up: 1910–11	†	
Walter Bull	England	May 1912	December 1912	39	12	12	15	30.7%			
Fred Lessons	England	August 1913	May 1915	76	30	30	16	39.4%			
Bob Hewison	England	May 1920	April 1925	226	89	51	86	39.3%			
Jack Tresadern	England	May 1925	October 1930	235	108	78	49	45.9%			
Jack English	England	February 1931	March 1935	193	76	43	74	39.3%			
Syd Puddefoot	England	March 1935	March 1937	98	43	16	39	43.8%			
Warney Cresswell	England	March 1937	September 1939	94	34	19	41	36.2%			
Tom Smith	England	September 1939	March 1949	131	45	32	53	34.3%			
Bob Dennison	England	March 1949	July 1954	254	108	59	87	42.5%			
Dave Smith	England	July 1954	July 1959	241	103	39	99	42.7%			
Dave Bowen	Wales	July 1959	September 1967	387	165	89	133	42.6%	Division Four promotion: 1960–61; Division Three champions: 1962–63; Division Two runners-up: 1964–65		
Tony Marchi	England	September 1967	May 1968	48	15	14	19	31.2%			
Ron Flowers	England	May 1968	May 1969	52	16	13	23	30.7%			
Dave Bowen	Wales	May 1969	May 1972	161	54	48	59	33.5%			
Billy Baxter	Scotland	October 1972	May 1973	48	10	11	27	20.8%			
Bill Dodgin Jr.	England	June 1973	June 1976	150	67	37	46	44.6%	Division Four runners-up: 1975–76		
Paddy Crerand	Scotland	September 1976	January 1977	25	5	4	16	20%			
Committee		January 1977	July 1977	25	9	4	12	36%		†	
John Petts	England	September 1977	January 1978	57	19	10	28	33.3%			
Mike Keen	England	February 1978	March 1979	53	17	15	21	32%			
Clive Walker	England	May 1979	October 1980	61	21	14	26	34.4%			
Bill Dodgin Jr.	England	October 1980	February 1982	70	22	18	30	31.4%			
Clive Walker	England	May 1982	May 1984	108	30	33	45	27.7%			
Tony Barton	England	July 1984	April 1985	49	11	8	30	22.4%			
Graham Carr	England	April 1985	May 1990	278	114	68	99	41%	Division Four champions: 1986–87		
Theo Foley	Ireland	May 1990	April 1992	97	32	29	36	32.9%			
Phil Chard	England	April 1992	September 1993	59	17	9	33	28.8%			
John Barnwell	England	September 1993	December 1994	22	7	6	9	31.8%			
Ian Atkins	England	January 1995	October 1999	254	93	72	89	36.6%	Division Three play-off winners: 1996–97		
Kevin Wilson	England	October 1999	September 2001	102	42	19	41	41.1%	Division Three promotion: 1999–2000		
Kevan Broadhurst	England	September 2001	January 2003	72	24	13	35	33.3%			
Terry Fenwick	England	January 2003	February 2003	7	0	2	5	0%			
Martin Wilkinson	England	February 2003	September 2003	25	7	3	15	28%		†	
Colin Calderwood	Scotland	October 2003	May 2006	153	73	40	40	47.7%	League Two runners-up: 2005–06		
John Gorman	Scotland	June 2006	December 2006	27	6	11	10	22.2%			
Stuart Gray	England	January 2007	September 2009	134	44	38	52	32.8%			
Ian Sampson	England	September 2009	March 2011	84	29	27	28	34.5%		†	
Gary Johnson	England	March 2011	November 2011	34	7	10	17	20.5%			
Aidy Boothroyd	England	November 2011	December 2013	108	39	26	43	36.1%			
Chris Wilder	England	January 2014	May 2016	126	61	28	37	48.4%	League Two champions: 2015–16		
Rob Page	Wales	May 2016	January 2017	34	10	8	16	29.4%			
Justin Edinburgh	England	January 2017	August 2017	25	6	6	13	24%			
Jimmy Floyd Hasselbaink	Netherlands	September 2017	April 2018	42	10	13	19	23.8%			
Dean Austin	England	April 2018	September 2018	17	3	6	8	17.6%		†	
Keith Curle	England	October 2018	February 2021	125	47	32	46	37.6%	League Two play-off winners: 2019–20		
Jon Brady	Australia	February 2021	December 2024	200	75	50	75	37.5%	League Two promotion: 2022–23	†	
Kevin Nolan	England	December 2024	March 2026	70	22	17	31	31.4%			
Chris Hogg	England	May 2026	to present								

=== Caretakers ===
Name	Nationality	From	To	P	W	D	L	Win %	Notes	Ref
Jack Jennings (interim)	England	July 1963	September 1963	3	3	0	0	100%	†	
Dave Bowen	Wales	January 1978	February 1978	6	3	1	2	50%		
Kevin Wilson; Kevan Broadhurst	England	October 1999		5	2	1	2	40%		
Richard Hill	England	September 2003	October 2003	2	0	1	1	0%		
Ian Sampson; Jim Barron	England	December 2006	January 2007	4	1	1	2	25%		
David Lee	England	November 2011		1	0	0	1	0%		
Tim Flowers	England	November 2011		1	0	0	1	0%		
Andy King	England	December 2013	January 2014	5	1	1	3	20%		
Paul Wilkinson	England	January 2017		1	0	0	1	0%		
Ian Sampson	England	December 2024		4	1	0	3	25%		
Colin Calderwood (interim)	Scotland	March 2026	May 2026	10	0	0	10	0%		

P = Matches played; W = Matches won; L = Matches lost; D = Matches drawn; Won % = Percentage of matches played that resulted in a win
