= 1999–2000 Northampton Town F.C. season =

Northampton Town
1999–2000 season
- Chairman: Barry Stonhill
- Manager: Ian Atkins (until 7 October); Kevin Wilson (from 7 October)
- Stadium: Sixfields Stadium
- Division Three: 3rd (Promoted)
- FA Cup: First round
- League Cup: First round
- League Trophy: Second round
- Top goalscorer: League: Carlo Corazzin (14); All: Carlo Corazzin (15)
- Highest home attendance: 6,901 vs Mansfield Town
- Lowest home attendance: 2,431 vs Cardiff City
- Average home league attendance: 5,459

The 1999–2000 season was Northampton Town's 103rd season in their history and the first season back in the Third Division after relegation the previous year. Alongside competing in Division Three, the club also participated in the FA Cup, League Cup and Football League Trophy.

== Players ==
As of match played 7 May 2000.

No.	Name	Position	Nat.	Place of Birth	Date of Birth (Age)	Apps	Goals	Previous club	Date signed	Fee
Goalkeepers
1	Keith Welch	GK	(England)	Bolton	3 October 1968 (aged 31)	42	0	Bristol City	21 June 1999	Free
13	Alex O'Reilly	GK	(Republic of Ireland)	Epping (ENG)	5 September 1979 (aged 20)	9	0	West Ham United	1 July 1999	Loan
Defenders
3	John Frain	LB	(England)	Birmingham	8 October 1968 (aged 31)	167	5	Birmingham City	Summer 1997	Free
4	Ian Sampson	CB	(England)	Wakefield	14 November 1968 (aged 31)	289	25	Sunderland	5 August 1994	£30,000
5	Lee Howey	CB	(England)	Sunderland	1 April 1969 (aged 31)	50	6	Burnley	19 February 1999	£50,000
12	Ian Hendon	RB	(England)	Ilford	5 December 1971 (aged 28)	55	3	Notts County	25 March 1999	£25,000
16	Garry Hughes	RB	(England)	Birmingham	19 November 1979 (aged 20)	4	0	Apprentice	7 July 1998	N/A
17	Richard Hope	CB	(England)	Stockton-on-Tees	22 June 1978 (aged 21)	40	0	Darlington	18 December 1998	Undisclosed
21	Richard Green	CB	(England)	Wolverhampton	22 November 1967 (aged 32)	22	2	Walsall	7 January 2000	Free
23	Tony Dobson	CB	(England)	Coventry	5 February 1969 (aged 31)	13	0	Gillingham	11 September 1998	£25,000
Midfielders
6	Sean Parrish	LM	(Wales)	Wrexham	14 March 1972 (aged 28)	122	16	Doncaster Rovers	2 August 1996	£35,000
7	Dave Savage	RM	(Republic of Ireland)	Dublin	30 July 1973 (aged 26)	78	10	Millwall	7 October 1998	£80,000
8	James Hunt	CM	(England)	Derby	17 December 1976 (aged 23)	113	4	Notts County	7 August 1997	Free
11	Roy Hunter	CM	(England)	Saltburn-by-the-Sea	29 October 1973 (aged 26)	163	16	West Bromwich Albion	2 August 1995	Free
14	John Hodge	W	(England)	Ormskirk	1 April 1969 (aged 31)	8	0	Gillingham	6 March 2000	£25,000
20	Duncan Spedding	LM	(England)	Camberley	7 September 1977 (aged 22)	78	1	Southampton	14 July 1998	Free
28	Ryan Thompson	W	(England)	Lambeth	24 June 1982 (aged 17)	1	0	Apprentice	1 July 1999	N/A
29	James Gould	W	(England)	Kettering	15 January 1982 (aged 18)	1	0	Apprentice	13 July 1999	N/A
Forwards
9	Steve Howard	FW	(England)	Durham	10 May 1976 (aged 23)	57	10	Hartlepool United	22 February 1999	£120,000
10	Carlo Corazzin	FW	(Canada)	New Westminster	25 December 1971 (aged 28)	89	32	Plymouth Argyle	26 June 1998	Bosman
18	Jamie Forrester	FW	(England)	Bradford	1 November 1974 (aged 25)	10	6	FC Utrecht	21 March 2000	Loan
19	Andy Morrow	FW	(Northern Ireland)	Bangor	5 October 1980 (aged 19)	5	0	Apprentice	16 December 1998	N/A
22	Kevin Wilson	FW	(Northern Ireland)	Banbury (ENG)	18 April 1961 (aged 39)	29	2	Walsall	28 July 1997	Free
26	Simon Sturridge	FW	(England)	Birmingham	9 December 1969 (aged 30)	19	1	Stoke City	2 August 1999	Free

== Competitions ==
=== Football League Division Three ===
==== League table ====
Pos	Team	Pld	W	D	L	GF	GA	GD	Pts	Promotion or relegation
1	Swansea City (C, P)	46	24	13	9	51	30	+21	85	Promotion to the Second Division
2	Rotherham United (P)	46	24	12	10	72	36	+36	84	Promotion to the Second Division
3	Northampton Town (P)	46	25	7	14	63	45	+18	82	Promotion to the Second Division
4	Darlington	46	21	16	9	66	36	+30	79	Qualification for the Third Division play-offs
5	Peterborough United (O, P)	46	22	12	12	63	54	+9	78	Qualification for the Third Division play-offs

Rules for classification: 1) Points; 2) Goal difference; 3) Goals scored
(C) Champions; (O) Play-off winners; (P) Promoted

==== Results summary ====
Overall								Home						Away					
Pld	W	D	L	GF	GA	GD	Pts	W	D	L	GF	GA	GD	W	D	L	GF	GA	GD
46	25	7	14	63	45	+18	82	16	2	5	36	18	+18	9	5	9	27	27	0

==== League position by match ====
Round	1	2	3	4	5	6	7	8	9	10	11	12	13	14	15	16	17	18	19	20	21	22	23	24	25	26	27	28	29	30	31	32	33	34	35	36	37	38	39	40	41	42	43	44	45	46
Ground	A	H	A	H	A	H	H	A	A	H	H	A	A	H	H	A	H	A	A	H	A	H	A	H	A	H	A	H	A	H	H	H	A	H	A	H	A	H	A	H	A	A	H	A	H	A
Result	L	L	W	W	W	D	W	L	L	L	W	W	D	L	W	D	W	W	W	W	L	D	D	L	D	W	L	W	D	W	W	W	L	W	L	W	L	W	L	L	W	W	W	W	W	W
Position	20	21	13	7	7	10	5	8	12	11	10	11	11	11	11	7	7	5	4	4	4	5	7	7	6	6	6	6	4	5	5	6	5	5	5	5	4	4	6	4	4	4	4	3	3	3

Source: 11v11
A = Away; H = Home; W = Win; D = Draw; L = Loss

==== Matches ====
Win Draw Loss

7 August 1999 1	Macclesfield Town	1–0	Northampton Town	Macclesfield
15:00 BST	R.Ingram (red card) 41'; R.Barker 57'			Stadium: Moss Rose; Attendance: 2,694; Referee: T Jones

14 August 1999 2	Northampton Town	0–1	Peterborough United	Northampton
15:00 BST			S.Davies 66'	Stadium: Sixfields Stadium; Attendance: 6,253; Referee: George Cain

18 August 1999 3	Chester City	0–2	Northampton Town	Chester
19:45 BST			I.Hendon 61' (pen.); D.Byfield 66'	Stadium: Deva Stadium; Attendance: 1,904; Referee: Mike Pike

27 August 1999 4	Northampton Town	1–0	Lincoln City	Northampton
19:45 BST	S.Howard 5'			Stadium: Sixfields Stadium; Attendance: 5,104; Referee: Graham Barber

30 August 1999 5	York City	0–1	Northampton Town	York
15:00 BST			C.Fairclough 72' (o.g.)	Stadium: Bootham Crescent; Attendance: 2,597

4 September 1999 6	Northampton Town	0–0	Carlisle United	Northampton
15:00 BST				Stadium: Sixfields Stadium; Attendance: 4,864; Referee: Phil Joslin

11 September 1999 7	Northampton Town	2–1	Hartlepool United	Northampton
15:00 BST	S.Howard 61', 71'		T.Miller 24'	Stadium: Sixfields Stadium; Attendance: 4,724; Referee: Scott Mathieson

18 September 1999 8	Barnet	2–1	Northampton Town	High Barnet, London
15:00 BST	K.Charlery 22', 36'		C.Corazzin 38'	Stadium: Underhill Stadium; Attendance: 3,638; Referee: Mike Jones

25 September 1999 9	Rotherham United	3–0	Northampton Town	Rotherham
15:00 BST	S.Thompson 14', 80' (pen.); L.Fortune-West 52'			Stadium: Millmoor; Attendance: 3,625; Referee: Alan Kaye

2 October 1999 10	Northampton Town	0–1	Rochdale	Northampton
15:00 BST			C.Platt 41'	Stadium: Sixfields Stadium; Attendance: 4,860; Referee: Steve Tomlin

9 October 1999 11	Northampton Town	3–0	Torquay United	Northampton
15:00 BST	J.Frain 34'; T.Battersby 82'; I.Sampson 86'		B.Healy (red card) 17'; R.Herrera (red card) 75'; L.Russell (red card) 75'	Stadium: Sixfields Stadium; Attendance: 5,003; Referee: Michael Ryan

16 October 1999 12	Hull City	0–1	Northampton Town	Kingston upon Hull
15:00 BST			S.Sturridge 57'	Stadium: Boothferry Park; Attendance: 6,467; Referee: Matt Messias

19 October 1999 13	Mansfield Town	0–0	Northampton Town	Mansfield
19:45 BST				Stadium: Field Mill; Attendance: 2,940; Referee: AR Hall

23 October 1999 14	Northampton Town	0–1	Rotherham United	Northampton
15:00 BST			P.Warne 80'	Stadium: Sixfields Stadium; Attendance: 5,753; Referee: Graham Laws

2 November 1999 15	Northampton Town	2–1	Swansea City	Northampton
19:45 GMT	C.Corazzin 36'; I.Sampson 73'		R.Appleby 75'	Stadium: Sixfields Stadium; Attendance: 4,495; Referee: Alan Wiley

6 November 1999 16	Leyton Orient	0–0	Northampton Town	Leyton, London
15:00 GMT				Stadium: Brisbane Road; Attendance: 3,928; Referee: Mark Halsey

12 November 1999 17	Northampton Town	3–2	Cheltenham Town	Northampton
19:45 GMT	D.Savage 26'; C.Corazzin 45'; D.Clare 87'		H.McAuley 11'; N.Grayson 83'	Stadium: Sixfields Stadium; Attendance: 5,837; Referee: M Fletcher

23 November 1999 18	Exeter City	1–2	Northampton Town	Exeter
19:45 GMT	J.Rees 7' (pen.)		C.Corazzin 40'; I.Hendon 78'	Stadium: St James Park; Attendance: 2,096; Referee: David Pugh

27 November 1999 19	Brighton & Hove Albion	1–3	Northampton Town	Brighton
15:00 GMT	W.Aspinall 31'		C.Corazzin 8' (pen.); D.Clare 53'; S.Parrish 55'	Stadium: Withdean Stadium; Attendance: 5,935; Referee: Barry Knight

4 December 1999 20	Northampton Town	2–0	Macclesfield Town	Northampton
15:00 GMT	R.Hunter 12'; C.Corazzin 54'			Stadium: Sixfields Stadium; Attendance: 5,355; Referee: Andy D'Urso

11 December 1999 21	Shrewsbury Town	1–0	Northampton Town	Shrewsbury
15:00 GMT	L.Steele 3'			Stadium: Gay Meadow; Attendance: 2,339; Referee: SJ Baines

17 December 1999 22	Northampton Town	1–1	Plymouth Argyle	Northampton
19:45 GMT	C.Corazzin 64'		P.McGregor 37'	Stadium: Sixfields Stadium; Attendance: 5,039; Referee: Graham Poll

26 December 1999 23	Southend United	2–2	Northampton Town	Southend
15:00 GMT	M.Carruthers 51'; N.Tolson 81'		J.Frain 61'; I.Sampson 78'	Stadium: Roots Hall; Attendance: 5,449; Referee: Keith Hill

28 December 1999 24	Northampton Town	0–3	Darlington	Northampton
15:00 GMT			M.Gabbiadini 18', 53'; J.Hjorth 38'	Stadium: Sixfields Stadium; Attendance: 6,823; Referee: Mike Jones

3 January 2000 25	Halifax Town	2–2	Northampton Town	Halifax
15:00 GMT	J.Paterson 7' (pen.); J.Cullen 90'		D.Peer 10'; S.Parrish 87'	Stadium: The Shay; Attendance: 3,001; Referee: Eddie Wolstenholme

8 January 2000 26	Northampton Town	3–0	Shrewsbury Town	Northampton
15:00 GMT	R.Green 8'; K.Wilson 23'; D.Clare 58'			Stadium: Sixfields Stadium; Attendance: 4,927; Referee: Paul Danson

15 January 2000 27	Peterborough United	1–0	Northampton Town	Peterborough
15:00 GMT	J.Lee 72'			Stadium: London Road Stadium; Attendance: 9,104; Referee: David Elleray

22 January 2000 28	Northampton Town	3–1	Chester City	Northampton
15:00 GMT	S.Howard 31'; I.Sampson 53'; C.Corazzin 57'		A.Pickering 2'	Stadium: Sixfields Stadium; Attendance: 5,332; Referee: Ray Olivier

29 January 2000 29	Lincoln City	2–2	Northampton Town	Lincoln
15:00 GMT	T.Henry 25'; T.Battersby 45'		R.Hunter 44'; C.Corazzin 64'	Stadium: Sincil Bank; Attendance: 3,717; Referee: Jeff Winter

5 February 2000 30	Northampton Town	3–0	York City	Northampton
15:00 GMT	I.Sampson 43'; S.Howard 56'; S.Parrish 66'			Stadium: Sixfields Stadium; Attendance: 4,958; Referee: Rob Styles

19 February 2000 31	Northampton Town	1–0	Brighton & Hove Albion	Northampton
15:00 GMT	I.Sampson 6'			Stadium: Sixfields Stadium; Attendance: 5,974; Referee: AB Wilkie

26 February 2000 32	Northampton Town	1–0	Barnet	Northampton
15:00 GMT	S.Howard 50'		W.Hackett (red card) 31'	Stadium: Sixfields Stadium; Attendance: 5,862; Referee: Mike Pike

4 March 2000 33	Hartlepool United	2–1	Northampton Town	Hartlepool
15:00 GMT	P.Stephenson 6'; G.Lee 29'		C.Corazzin 33'	Stadium: Victoria Park; Attendance: 2,878; Referee: Paul Robinson

7 March 2000 34	Northampton Town	2–1	Leyton Orient	Northampton
19:45 GMT	S.Howard 68'; R.Hunter 73'		I.Christie 70'	Stadium: Sixfields Stadium; Attendance: 5,121; Referee: Eddie Wolstenholme

10 March 2000 35	Swansea City	4–1	Northampton Town	Swansea, Wales
19:45 GMT	S.Watkin 18'; J.Coates 56'; M.Thomas 85'; T.Bird 90'		C.Corazzin 76'; I.Hendon (red card) 78'	Stadium: Vetch Field; Attendance: 7,430; Referee: David Crick

18 March 2000 36	Northampton Town	2–1	Exeter City	Northampton
15:00 GMT	R.Green 25'; C.Corazzin 36'		D.Rowbotham 57'	Stadium: Sixfields Stadium; Attendance: 4,989; Referee: Phil Richards

21 March 2000 37	Cheltenham Town	2–1	Northampton Town	Cheltenham
19:45 GMT	M.Duff 43'; J.Victory 87'		D.Savage 77'	Stadium: Whaddon Road; Attendance: 4,515; Referee: Peter Jones

25 March 2000 38	Northampton Town	2–0	Southend United	Northampton
15:00 GMT	D.Savage 27'; J.Forrester 71'			Stadium: Sixfields Stadium; Attendance: 5,426; Referee: Bill Jordon

1 April 2000 39	Plymouth Argyle	2–1	Northampton Town	Plymouth
15:00 BST	P.McGregor 23'; J.Rowbotham 71'		C.Corazzin 11'	Stadium: Home Park; Attendance: 5,448; Referee: Paul Danson

8 April 2000 40	Northampton Town	3–4	Halifax Town	Northampton
15:00 BST	D.Savage 14'; J.Forrester 23', 45'		R.Painter 2'; P.Stoneman 31'; C.Middleton 51'; S.Kerrigan 90'	Stadium: Sixfields Stadium; Attendance: 5,207; Referee: Trevor Parkes

11 April 2000 41	Carlisle United	0–1	Northampton Town	Carlisle
19:45 BST			J.Forrester 30'	Stadium: Brunton Park; Attendance: 2,855; Referee: Anthony Leake
Note: Fixture was previously postponed on February 12, 2000.

15 April 2000 42	Darlington	0–1	Northampton Town	Darlington
15:00 BST			S.Howard 5'	Stadium: Feethams; Attendance: 5,833; Referee: Roger Furnandiz

21 April 2000 43	Northampton Town	1–0	Hull City	Northampton
19:45 BST	J.Forrester 5'			Stadium: Sixfields Stadium; Attendance: 6,758; Referee: Mike Dean

24 April 2000 44	Rochdale	0–3	Northampton Town	Rochdale
15:00 BST			S.Howard 2'; J.Hunt 40'; C.Corazzin 83'	Stadium: Spotland; Attendance: 2,891; Referee: Michael Ryan

21 April 2000 45	Northampton Town	1–0	Mansfield Town	Northampton
15:00 BST	D.Savage 42'			Stadium: Sixfields Stadium; Attendance: 6,901; Referee: Steve Bennett

6 May 2000 46	Torquay United	1–2	Northampton Town	Torquay
15:00 BST	T.Bedeau 17'		J.Forrester 26'; S.Howard 40'	Stadium: Plainmoor; Attendance: 5,010; Referee: M J Brandwood

=== FA Cup ===
23 October 1999 First round	Shrewsbury Town	2–1	Northampton Town	Shrewsbury
15:00 BST	S.Kerrigan 24'; P.Wilding 70'		I.Hendon 43'	Stadium: Gay Meadow; Attendance: 2,584; Referee: M Fletcher

=== League Cup ===
10 August 1999 First round 1st Leg	Northampton Town	1–2	Fulham	Northampton
19:45 BST	C.Corazzin 66' (pen.)	Report	S.Davis 60'; G.Horsfield 85'	Stadium: Sixfields Stadium; Attendance: 4,415; Referee: Chris Foy

24 August 1999 First round 2nd Leg	Fulham	3–1	Northampton Town	Fulham, London
19:45 BST	G.Horsfield 6', 43', 44'	Report	D.Byfield 30'	Stadium: Craven Cottage; Attendance: 5,515; Referee: K A Leach

=== League Trophy ===
7 December 1999 First round (s)	Northampton Town	1–0	Cardiff City	Northampton
19:45 GMT	S.Parrish 69'			Stadium: Sixfields Stadium; Attendance: 2,431; Referee: Paul Taylor

11 January 2000 Second round (s)	Northampton Town	0–0 (a.e.t.) (3–5 p)	Bristol Rovers	Northampton
19:45 GMT				Stadium: Sixfields Stadium; Attendance: 2,443; Referee: Guy Stretton

=== Appearances, goals and cards ===
No.	Pos	Player	Division Three			FA Cup			League Cup			League Trophy			Total			Discipline	
No.	Pos	Player	Starts	Sub	Goals	Starts	Sub	Goals	Starts	Sub	Goals	Starts	Sub	Goals	Starts	Sub	Goals	Booked	Sent off (straight red)
1	GK	Keith Welch	39	–	–	1	–	–	1	–	–	1	–	–	42	–	–	1	–
3	LB	John Frain	40	–	2	–	–	–	2	–	–	–	–	–	42	–	2	5	–
4	CB	Ian Sampson	45	–	6	1	–	–	2	–	–	–	–	–	48	–	6	6	–
5	CB	Lee Howey	20	–	–	1	–	–	2	–	–	1	–	–	24	–	–	4	–
6	CM	Sean Parrish	21	4	3	–	–	–	–	–	–	2	–	1	23	4	3	4	–
7	RM	Dave Savage	43	–	5	1	–	–	2	–	–	1	–	–	48	–	5	2	–
8	CM	James Hunt	33	4	1	1	–	–	2	–	–	2	–	–	38	4	1	6	–
9	ST	Steve Howard	32	9	10	–	1	–	2	–	–	1	–	–	35	10	10	9	–
10	ST	Carlo Corazzin	27	12	14	1	–	–	1	1	1	–	–	–	29	13	15	–	–
11	CM	Roy Hunter	15	2	3	–	–	–	1	–	–	1	–	–	17	2	3	1	–
12	RB	Ian Hendon	44	–	2	1	–	1	2	–	–	1	–	–	48	–	3	4	1
14	RM	John Hodge	5	3	–	–	–	–	–	–	–	–	–	–	5	3	–	–	–
15	GK	Alex O'Reilly	7	–	–	–	–	–	1	–	–	1	–	–	9	–	–	–	–
16	RB	Garry Hughes	1	1	–	–	–	–	–	–	–	1	–	–	2	1	–	–	–
17	CB	Richard Hope	14	3	–	–	1	–	–	–	–	2	–	–	17	3	–	2	–
18	ST	Jamie Forrester	9	1	6	–	–	–	–	–	–	–	–	–	9	1	6	–	–
19	ST	Andy Morrow	–	3	–	–	–	–	–	–	–	2	–	–	2	3	–	–	–
20	LM	Duncan Spedding	44	–	–	1	–	–	2	–	–	2	–	–	49	–	–	3	–
21	CB	Richard Green	21	–	2	–	–	–	–	–	–	1	–	–	22	–	2	–	–
22	ST	Kevin Wilson	4	4	1	–	1	–	1	1	–	–	–	–	5	6	1	1	–
23	CB	Tony Dobson	1	–	–	–	–	–	–	–	–	–	–	–	1	–	–	1	–
26	ST	Simon Sturridge	10	8	1	1	–	–	–	–	–	–	–	–	11	8	1	1	–
28	MF	Ryan Thompson	–	–	–	–	–	–	–	–	–	–	1	–	–	1	–	1	–
29	LM	James Gould	–	–	–	–	–	–	–	–	–	–	1	–	–	1	–	–	–
Players who left before season end:
2	RB	Ian Clarkson	1	1	–	–	–	–	–	1	–	–	–	–	1	2	–	2	–
14	CM	Ali Gibb	6	7	–	1	–	–	–	1	–	2	–	–	9	8	–	–	–
18	ST	Tony Battersby	–	3	1	–	–	–	–	–	–	–	–	–	–	3	1	–	–
18	ST	Darren Byfield	6	–	1	–	–	–	1	–	1	–	–	–	7	–	2	–	–
18	ST	Daryl Clare	9	1	3	–	–	–	–	–	–	–	–	1	9	1	3	1	–
18	ST	Dean Crowe	3	2	–	–	–	–	–	–	–	–	–	–	3	2	–	1	–
21	MF	Damian Matthew	–	1	–	–	–	–	–	–	–	–	–	–	–	1	–	–	–
25	ST	Paul Wilkinson	–	–	–	–	–	–	–	–	–	–	–	–	–	–	–	–	–
27	MF	Dean Peer	6	3	1	1	–	–	–	–	–	1	–	–	8	3	1	1	–
30	MF	Mark Dickson	–	–	–	–	–	–	–	–	–	–	1	–	–	1	–	–	–
–	MF	Richard Butcher	–	–	–	–	–	–	–	–	–	–	–	–	–	–	–	–	–
–	ST	Steve McGavin	–	–	–	–	–	–	–	–	–	–	–	–	–	–	–	–	–

== Transfers ==
=== Transfers in ===
Date from	Position	Nationality	Name	From	Fee	Ref.
21 June 1999	GK	(England)	Keith Welch	Bristol City	Free transfer	
27 July 1999	CF	(England)	Simon Sturridge	Stoke City	Free transfer	
10 January 2000	CB	(England)	Richard Green	Walsall	Free Transfer	
6 March 2000	RM	(England)	John Hodge	Gillingham	£25,000	

=== Transfers out ===
Date from	Position	Nationality	Name	To	Fee	Ref.
14 June 1999	GK	(England)	Billy Turley	Rushden & Diamonds	£120,000	
2 August 1999	CF	(England)	Christian Lee	Gillingham	£35,000	
25 September 1999	LM	(England)	Damian Matthew	N/A	Retired	
1 October 1999	CF	(England)	Steve McGavin	Colchester United	Free	
6 November 1999	RB	(England)	Ian Clarkson	Kidderminster	Free	
25 January 2000	CM	(England)	Dean Peer	Shrewsbury Town	Free	
17 February 2000	CM	(England)	Ali Gibb	Stockport County	£50,000	
23 March 2000	CM	(England)	Richard Butcher	Rushden & Diamonds	Free	

=== Loans in ===
Start date	Position	Nationality	Name	From	End date	Ref.
1 July 1999	GK	(Republic of Ireland)	Alex O'Reilly	West Ham United	30 June 2000	
20 March 2000	CF	(England)	Jamie Forrester	FC Utrecht	30 June 2000	
