= Matthew Rush =

Matthew Rush may refer to:

- Matthew Rush (footballer) (born 1971), English football winger
- Matt Rush (born 2001), English football forward
