= Danny O'Hagan =

English footballer

Personal information
- Date of birth: April 24, 1976 (age 50)
- Place of birth: England
- Position: Forward

Senior career*
Years	Team	Apps	(Gls)
-1997	Plymouth Argyle F.C.	3	(0)
1997	Weston-super-Mare A.F.C.		
1997	The Albemarle		
1997-1998	Plymouth Argyle F.C.	9	(1)
- * Club domestic league appearances and goals

Danny O'Hagan (born 24 April 1976) is an English footballer.

== Career ==
After being released from Plymouth Argyle at the end of 1996-97 season, O'Hagan played Sunday league football with The Albemarle. However, he returned to the club in November 1997 due to a shortage of attacking options and started in a 3–0 win over Bournemouth.
