= Chris Freestone =

English footballer (born 1971)

Personal information
- Full name: Christopher Freestone
- Date of birth: 4 September 1971 (age 55)
- Place of birth: Nottingham, England
- Height: 5 ft 11 in (1.80 m)
- Position: Striker

Senior career*
Years	Team	Apps	(Gls)
1993–1994	Arnold Town	60	(67)
1994–1997	Middlesbrough	9	(2)
1997	→ Carlisle United (loan)	5	(3)
1997	→ Northampton Town (loan)	2	(2)
1997–1999	Northampton Town	86	(50)
1999–2000	Hartlepool United	77	(42)
2000	→ Cheltenham Town (loan)	5	(3)
2000–2002	Shrewsbury Town	57	(2)
2002	Forest Green Rovers	1	(0)
2002	→ Dundalk (loan)		
2002	Rugby United		
2002	King's Lynn		
2002	Leek Town		
2002–2004	Ilkeston Town	72	(41)
2004–2005	Gresley Rovers		
2005	→ Long Eaton United (loan)		
2005–2012	Arnold Town	165	(52)
2013	Hucknall Town		
2018	Gedling Miners Welfare	1	(1)

Managerial career
- 2009–2012: Arnold Town
- 2012 - 2014: England Learning Disabilities team
- * Club domestic league appearances and goals

Chris Freestone (born 4 September 1971) is an English former professional footballer who played as a striker.

== Career ==
Freestone joined Middlesbrough from Nottinghamshire club Arnold Town of the Northern Counties (East) League midway through the 1994–95 season. Before joining Boro for a small fee he had netted 54 goals for Arnold Town and had trials with Leeds United, Nottingham Forest, Notts County and Chesterfield. Fast and confident, he had averaged almost a goal a game for Boro reserves in two seasons since joining. Freestone scored on his full first team debut in the 3–1 win over Sheffield Wednesday in April 1996. His only other goal for Boro came in the League Cup against Barnet in September 1997. He was also on the pitch as a late substitute as Boro confirmed their spot in the 1997 FA Cup Final with a semi final replay victory over Chesterfield, however he was left out of the final match day squad altogether as they lost 2–0 to Chelsea. After a loan spell, Freestone joined Northampton in December 1997 scoring 20 goals including a hat trick against Plymouth Argyle. The highlight of his time at Northampton was scoring two goals against Premier League side West Ham United in the 1998–99 League Cup. Freestone's brace in the first leg gave Northampton a 2–0 lead going into the second leg, in which West Ham were only able to muster a 1–0 win with a Frank Lampard goal meaning that Northampton knocked out their illustrious opponents. After leaving Northampton, Freestone signed for Hartlepool United and scored the 2 goals against Scarborough that kept them in the Football League. He also had a loan spell at Cheltenham Town where he scored 3 goals in 5 games and earned himself 3 man of the match awards in that time, before signing for Shrewsbury Town. At Shrewsbury although he scored against Man United during Pre-season he failed to score in the league but did score once in the League Cup against Preston North End and once in the FA Cup against former club Cheltenham.

After leaving Shrewsbury he subsequently played for Dundalk, Airdrie and Forest Green Rovers before dropping back and playing for several non-League clubs, including King's Lynn, Leek Town, Ilkeston Town, Gresley Rovers, Long Eaton United, Arnold Town and Hucknall Town.

He was appointed joint manager of Arnold Town alongside Martin Carruthers two games into the 2009–10 season. They both left the club in June 2012. In 2012 Whilst working for the FA he was appointed Head Coach for the England Learning Disabilities team where they finished 3rd in the European Championships in Sweden and 1st in the Tri-Nations Tournament in England in 2014. He was later appointed Assistant Manager of Basford United in 2014.
