= Stuart Brock =

English footballer

Personal information
- Full name: Stuart Alan Brock
- Date of birth: 26 September 1976 (age 50)
- Place of birth: West Bromwich, England
- Height: 6 ft 1 in (1.85 m)
- Position: Goalkeeper

Youth career
- ?–1995: Aston Villa

Senior career*
Years	Team	Apps	(Gls)
1995–1997	Aston Villa	0	(0)
1997	Northampton Town	0	(0)
1997	Solihull Borough		
1997–2004	Kidderminster Harriers^{[A]}	147	(0)
2004	Halesowen Town	0	(0)
2004–2007	AFC Telford United	132	(0)
2004	→ Hull City (loan)	0	(0)
2007–2008	Bromsgrove Rovers	4	(0)
2008	Willenhall Town	11	(0)
2008–2009	Hednesford Town	34	(0)
2009	Stourbridge	12	(0)
2009–2010	Hednesford Town	3	(0)
Total		343	(0)
- * Club domestic league appearances and goals as of 19:03, 8 October 2017 (UTC)

Stuart Alan Brock (born 26 September 1976) is an English footballer who made 135 appearances in the Football League playing as a goalkeeper for Kidderminster Harriers. His last known club was Hednesford Town, from which he departed in 2010.

== Career ==
A former Aston Villa trainee, Brock spent three years as a professional at Villa Park, but never made a first team appearance. He joined Northampton Town in March 1997, but once again failed to make the first team. At the end of the 1996–1997 season, he was released, where he joined Football Conference side Kidderminster Harriers.

He became Harriers number one soon after, going on to play over 150 times for the Aggborough club. He won the Conference title with Harriers in 2000-2001 – despite having to battle for the number one jersey with the vastly experienced Tim Clarke – and made twenty six appearances as they romped to the title.

After falling down the pecking order during the 2003–2004 season, Brock left Kidderminster in the summer of 2004, joining Halesowen Town. His stay was brief – a week – before he became one of AFC Telford United's first ever signings in July 2004. In his three years at the New Bucks Head, he played over 100 times, making him the reformed club's highest appearance maker, and won two promotions.

Sandwiched in between were two more goes at professional football; firstly, in October 2004, Peter Taylor's Hull City came calling, with Brock spending a month on loan at the KC Stadium as cover for regular keeper (and another ex-Villa trainee) Boaz Myhill. He also trialled for League Two side Oxford United in early 2005, playing in a reserve game for the Kassam Stadium side.

After clinching promotion to Conference North via the Northern Premier League play-offs in 2006–2007, Telford brought in Hednesford's Ryan Young, immediately relegating Brock to the stands. He was allowed to leave in November 2007, joining Southern League Premier Division strugglers Bromsgrove Rovers for a short spell, before dropping down a further level to link up with Dean Edwards at Willenhall Town, where he saw out the 2007–2008 season.

== Notes ==
A.: Kidderminster appearances from 1999–2000 season onwards only.
