= Alex O'Reilly =

Footballer (born 1979)

Personal information
- Full name: Alex Thomas O'Reilly
- Date of birth: 5 September 1979 (age 47)
- Place of birth: Epping, England
- Position: Goalkeeper

Senior career*
Years	Team	Apps	(Gls)
1997–2001	West Ham United	0	(0)
1999–2000	→ Northampton Town (loan)	7	(0)
2000	→ Wigan Athletic (loan)	0	(0)
2001	Bristol Rovers	0	(0)
2003–2004	Gravesend & Northfleet	11	(0)
2004	Stevenage Borough	0	(0)
2004	Dagenham & Redbridge	3	(0)
2009	Athlone Town	11	(0)

International career
1998	Republic of Ireland U19		
1999	Republic of Ireland U21		
- * Club domestic league appearances and goals

Alex Thomas O'Reilly (born 5 September 1979) is a former professional footballer who played as a goalkeeper in the Football League for Northampton Town. Born in England, he represented the Republic of Ireland internationally at youth levels U19 and U21.

== Career ==
Alex's footballing career began as a trainee with West Ham United, where he became a professional in 1997. After being with the Hammers for two years, in which he had failed to make a first team appearance, he went out on loan to Northampton Town at the start of the 1999–2000 season. He played three times during his first loan spell, playing twice in the league and once in the League Cup. He returned to West Ham towards the end of August 1999, but made enough impact with the Cobblers for them to take O'Reilly for a second loan spell in October 1999 where he made six appearances. After returning to the Hammers again, he made a brief loan move to Wigan Athletic in November 2000, where he didn't appear in the first team, before being given permission to leave West Ham on a free transfer to join Bristol Rovers on a monthly basis in March 2001.

After being released by Rovers in 2001, O'Reilly joined Purfleet, where he stayed for two years. In 2003, he signed for Gravesend & Northfleet, before moving to Fisher Athletic. He joined Stevenage Borough at the start of the 2004–05 season, but his stay was short-lived and he moved to Dagenham & Redbridge early during the campaign. For much of the 2004–05 season, he was then loaned out to Redbridge by the Daggers.

He signed for Athlone Town in March 2009.

== Personal life ==
In July 2017 O'Reilly graduated from the University of Salford with a degree in physiotherapy as part of a scheme between the university and the Professional Footballers Association aimed at preparing current and former footballers for careers after football.

== Honours ==
Republic of Ireland U19

- UEFA European Under-19 Football Championship: 1998
