= Andy Woodman =

English football manager (born 1971)

Personal information
- Full name: Andrew John Woodman
- Date of birth: 11 August 1971 (age 55)
- Place of birth: Camberwell, England
- Height: 6 ft 3 in (1.91 m)
- Position: Goalkeeper

Youth career
- ?–1989: Crystal Palace

Senior career*
Years	Team	Apps	(Gls)
1989–1994	Crystal Palace	0	(0)
1994–1995	Exeter City	6	(0)
1995–1999	Northampton Town	163	(0)
1999	→ Brentford (loan)	1	(0)
1999–2001	Brentford	60	(0)
2000	→ Peterborough United (loan)	0	(0)
2000	→ Southend United (loan)	17	(0)
2000	→ Colchester United (loan)	6	(0)
2001–2002	Colchester United	48	(0)
2002	→ Oxford United (loan)	12	(0)
2002–2004	Oxford United	89	(0)
2004–2005	Stevenage Borough	21	(0)
2005	Redbridge	1	(0)
2005	Thurrock	14	(0)
2005–2006	Rushden & Diamonds	3	(0)
Total		438	(0)

Managerial career
- 2017: Whitehawk
- 2021–2026: Bromley
- * Club domestic league appearances and goals

Andrew John Woodman (born 11 August 1971) is an English football manager and former player who played as a goalkeeper. He was most recently manager of EFL League One club Bromley.

Woodman made league appearances for 10 clubs in England during his playing career. Following his retirement, aside from his managerial career, he has been a goalkeeping coach at several Premier League clubs, including Newcastle United, West Ham United, Crystal Palace, and Arsenal.

== Playing career ==
Woodman spent the first five years of his career playing at Crystal Palace without making a first team appearance. In 1994, he moved to Exeter City making his debut at Lincoln City on the opening day of the season, but his time at St. James' Park was cut short following red cards in two successive matches. He was first sent off against Leyton Orient for violent conduct and then a week later for deliberate handball against Colchester United in the FA Cup. In both games, Woodman was replaced by 15-year old substitute Ross Bellotti, who remains the youngest goalkeeper ever to appear in the football league or FA Cup proper.

Woodman moved to Northampton Town in March 1995. He was loaned to Brentford in January 1999 and then moved there on a free transfer. After loans spells at Southend United and Colchester United in 2000, he signed permanently for Colchester United for the start of the 2001–02 season. Woodman found himself loaned out again, this time to Oxford United in January 2002, before signing permanently for them when the loan ended in March. Woodman was released by Oxford United in 2004 and then played for Stevenage Borough, Redbridge and Thurrock. His final match for Thurrock was a 4–2 Conference South play-off defeat against Eastbourne Borough on 3 May 2005. Woodman then briefly returned to the Football League with Rushden & Diamonds, making the final appearance of his career in a 2–1 defeat at Barnet on 29 October 2005.

== Coaching career ==
=== Coaching ===
In spring of 2006 he was appointed assistant manager at Rushden & Diamonds but left the club after they were relegated from the Football League at the end of that season to join his former teammate Alan Pardew at West Ham United as a coach. When Pardew moved to Charlton Athletic, Woodman followed him in the summer of 2007 as goalkeeping coach. In December 2010 he linked up with Pardew again at Newcastle United as goalkeeping coach and on 31 July 2015, he joined Crystal Palace in the same position to work under Pardew again. On 9 January 2017, following Pardew's departure and the appointment of Sam Allardyce as manager of Crystal Palace, it was announced that Woodman had left the club.

=== Whitehawk ===
Woodman was appointed to his first managerial role on 1 February 2017 at National League South club Whitehawk. He left the club later that year after ensuring National League South safety.

=== Bromley ===
On 29 March 2021, he left his position as Head of Goalkeeping at Arsenal and was appointed as the new manager of National League club Bromley. After guiding the club to the play-offs on the final day of the season, Woodman was awarded the league's Manager of the Month award for May 2021. They lost the play-off quarter-final 3–2 to Hartlepool United.

On 18 January 2022, Bromley announced that they had received an official approach from League One side Gillingham for permission to speak to Woodman regarding their managerial vacancy. Bromley went on to say that permission had been granted for both parties to speak. On 30 January Bromley announced that Woodman would stay on as manager after turning down the approach from Gillingham.

In May 2022, Woodman won his first trophy as a manager, the FA Trophy, defeating Wrexham in the final.

A strong start to the 2023–24 season saw Woodman awarded the Manager of the Month award for a second time for September 2023, guiding his side to nineteen points from a possible twenty-one. Having finished 2023 in second place, he won the award for a second time in the season for December. In May 2024, Bromley won the 2024 National League play-off final which saw the club promoted to the EFL for the first time in their history.

In their first season in the Football League, Bromley finished 11th. They also reached the third round of the FA Cup where they took the lead against Newcastle United before losing 3–1. In the 2025–26 season, Bromley claimed their first EFL Cup win after defeating Ipswich Town on penalties in the first round. On 15 August 2025, Woodman signed a new contract extension to keep him with Bromley until the summer of 2028.

Woodman was named EFL League Two Manager of the Month following a run of five wins from five matches that saw the Ravens end 2025 top of the league.

On 18 April 2026, following Notts County's 2–1 defeat to Barnet, Bromley were promoted to League One for the first time in the club's history. The following day, Woodman was named League Two Manager of the Season at the 2026 EFL Awards.

Woodman was sacked by Bromley on 22 October 2026, bringing to a close his five and a half year tenure at the club.

== Personal life ==
Woodman's son, Freddie, is a goalkeeper with Liverpool. Former England player and manager Gareth Southgate is Freddie's godfather. Woodman co-authored a book with Southgate, Woody & Nord: A Football Friendship, about their close friendship, which grew from their time together as youth players at Crystal Palace, followed by their wildly differing fortunes in the professional game. The book won the Best Sports Autobiography category at the 2004 British Sports Book Awards.

== Managerial statistics ==
As of match played 20 October 2026

Managerial record by team and tenure
Team	From	To	Record					Ref.
Team	From	To	P	W	D	L	Win %	Ref.
Whitehawk	1 February 2017	7 June 2017	18	6	3	9	33.3	
Bromley	29 March 2021	22 October 2026	289	123	90	76	42.6	
Total			307	129	93	85	42.0	

== Honours ==
=== Player ===
Northampton Town

- Football League Third Division play-offs: 1997

Brentford

- Football League Third Division: 1998–99

=== Manager ===
Bromley

- EFL League Two: 2025–26
- National League play-offs: 2024
- FA Trophy: 2021–22

Individual

- National League Manager of the Month: May 2021, September 2023, December 2023
- EFL League Two Manager of the Month: December 2025
- EFL League Two Manager of the Season: 2025–26
