= Mark Cooper (footballer, born 1967) =

English footballer

Personal information
- Full name: Mark David Cooper
- Date of birth: 5 April 1967 (age 59)
- Place of birth: Watford, England
- Position: Striker

Senior career*
Years	Team	Apps	(Gls)
1983–1987	Cambridge United	71	(17)
1987	Tottenham Hotspur	0	(0)
1987	→ Shrewsbury Town (loan)	6	(2)
1987–1989	Gillingham	49	(11)
1989–1994	Leyton Orient	150	(45)
1994–1996	Barnet	67	(19)
1996–1997	Northampton Town	41	(10)
1997–1998	Welling United	1	(0)
Total		379	(104)
- * Club domestic league appearances and goals

Mark David Cooper (born 5 April 1967) is an English former footballer. He began his career with Cambridge United before joining Tottenham Hotspur in 1987. He failed to break into the Spurs first team and joined Gillingham in 1987 for a fee of £102,500. This was a club record for Gillingham but his spell at Priestfield Stadium was unsuccessful and he came to be regarded as a high-priced flop for the Kent club. He moved on to Leyton Orient in 1989 and later played for Barnet, Northampton Town and Peterborough United before finishing his career in Non-League football.

== Honours ==
Leyton Orient

- Football League Fourth Division play-offs: 1989
