= Ian Atkins =

English football player and manager (born 1957)

Personal information
- Full name: Ian Leslie Atkins
- Date of birth: 16 January 1957 (age 69)
- Place of birth: Birmingham, England
- Height: 6 ft 0 in (1.83 m)
- Position: Defender

Youth career
- 1973–1975: Shrewsbury Town

Senior career*
Years	Team	Apps	(Gls)
1975–1982	Shrewsbury Town	279	(55)
1982–1984	Sunderland	77	(6)
1984–1985	Everton	7	(1)
1985–1988	Ipswich Town	77	(4)
1988–1990	Birmingham City	93	(6)
1990–1991	Colchester United	41	(7)
1991–1992	Birmingham City	8	(0)
1992–1993	Cambridge United	2	(0)
1993–1994	Doncaster Rovers	7	(0)
Total		591	(79)

Managerial career
- 1990–1991: Colchester United
- 1992–1993: Cambridge United
- 1993–1994: Doncaster Rovers
- 1994–1999: Northampton Town
- 2000: Chester City
- 2000–2001: Carlisle United
- 2001–2004: Oxford United
- 2004–2005: Bristol Rovers
- 2006: Torquay United
- * Club domestic league appearances and goals

Ian Leslie Atkins (born 16 January 1957) is an English football manager, scout, and former player. Atkins amassed over 300 appearances for Shrewsbury Town, the club where he began his career. He also made appearances in the Football League for Sunderland, Everton, Ipswich Town and Birmingham City.

His first managerial role came as player-manager at Colchester United in 1990, narrowly missing out on promotion to the Football League. He also managed Cambridge United and Doncaster Rovers as player-manager, and found his most notable success at Northampton Town, leading the club to promotion via the play-offs in the Third Division in 1997 and finishing as play-off runners-up in the Second Division final the following season. In addition, he has been manager of Chester City, Carlisle United, Oxford United, Bristol Rovers and Torquay United.

== Playing career ==
Atkins was born in the Sheldon district of Birmingham, where he attended Sheldon Heath School. He joined Shrewsbury Town in 1973 as an apprentice and signed a professional contract in 1975. Between 1975 and 1982, he made over 300 appearances in all competitions for Shrewsbury, helping the club to two promotions; from the Fourth Division to the Third Division and from the Third Division to the Second Division.

Atkins was signed by First Division team Sunderland in 1982 in a swap-deal and an £80,000 fee going to Shrewsbury. He made his debut for the club in a 3–1 win over European Cup holders Aston Villa. After two years and 77 league appearances at Roker Park, Atkins moved to Everton for £60,000, where he made just seven appearances, only playing a minimal role in securing the 1984–85 First Division title and European Cup Winners' Cup triumph, but receiving winners' medals for both.

Ipswich Town signed Atkins in September 1985 from Everton for a £100,000 fee, making his debut in a 1–0 away defeat to Leicester City on 28 September. He was captain of the club during his stint with Town, making 77 league appearances, although he could not help prevent Ipswich being relegated from the First to the Second Division. Atkins joined hometown team Birmingham City in March 1988, making 93 appearances and scoring six goals.

== Managerial career ==
=== Colchester United ===
Atkins' managerial career began at Colchester United in 1990, signing as player-manager from Birmingham City. The onus was on Atkins to regain immediate promotion back to the Football League from the Conference, Colchester having been relegated the previous season. The club remained full-time in their first season outside the Football League since 1950, as the U's finished in second place, two points behind Barnet and missing out on promotion much to the dismay of the United chairman Jonathan Crisp. Atkins made 41 league appearances for the club and scored seven goals.

=== Cambridge United ===
After leaving Colchester, Atkins returned to Birmingham City as player-coach, but made only eight appearances between 1991 and 1992. In December 1992, Atkins took the managers position at Cambridge United, but spent just six months with the club, unable to prevent them from relegation having shown little ability in the transfer market.

=== Doncaster Rovers ===
He returned to Sunderland as assistant manager to Terry Butcher in 1993, before being sacked alongside Butcher. Atkins was approached to succeed Steve Beaglehole as manager of Doncaster Rovers in January 1994, making seven appearances as player-manager. He left in the summer of 1994 following disagreements with club owner Ken Richardson.

=== Northampton Town ===
Atkins became manager of Northampton Town in January 1995 and was quick to turn around the fortunes of the club. He took Northampton to Wembley twice, in the 1997 Football League Third Division play-off final, which Northampton won 1–0 against Swansea City to gain promotion to the Second Division, and the 1998 Football League Second Division play-off final, which the team lost to Grimsby Town 1–0.

The following season, Northampton were relegated back to the Third Division, and Atkins departed in October 1999.

=== Chester City ===
His next challenge was at Chester City, joining as manager in January 2000 but by the end of May 2000, with Chester relegated from the Football League, he severed his ties with the club.

=== Carlisle United ===
In June 2000, Atkins was appointed manager at Carlisle United. Despite leading the Cumbrian side to safety from relegation in Division Three, Atkins was threatened with being sacked by owner Michael Knighton.

Atkins left Carlisle to become assistant manager to Alan Cork at Cardiff City in July 2001, but was sacked in October.

=== Oxford United ===
Soon after, he took over from Mark Wright as director of football at Oxford United, and was appointed manager in April 2002.

2001–02 was Oxford's first season in the bottom division of the Football League for over 30 years, and they finished a record low 21st place in the final table.

Atkins rebuilt the team during the 2002 close season and the new-look squad looked capable of achieving a far higher position in the coming season. Oxford United occupied the automatic promotion and playoff places in Division Three for much of the 2002–03 season, but a slight dip in form during the final weeks of the season saw them finish eighth in the final table—one place short of the playoffs.

A lively start to the 2003–04 season saw Oxford United leading the Division Three table at Christmas with just one defeat in over 20 fixtures. Atkins was suspended in March 2004 and then dismissed the following month for talking to Bristol Rovers about the possibility of taking over as manager, which he subsequently did.

=== Bristol Rovers ===
Atkins was at Bristol Rovers for just over a year, and he was sacked after a disappointing start to the 2005–06 season.

=== Torquay United ===
He returned to management in April 2006 when tasked with the seemingly impossible task of keeping Torquay United in the Football League, after joining the club as an advisor to John Cornforth the previous month. However, a run of four straight wins and a draw on the last day of the season lifted Torquay out of the relegation zone, and then Atkins was appointed manager for the following season. However, on 27 November 2006, Atkins was replaced as manager by Czech international star Luboš Kubík. Atkins was offered the role of Director of Football, but turned it down.

=== Post Management ===
Since leaving Torquay, Atkins went on to work as a recruitment officer throughout Europe for Sunderland, including scout work for a number of other clubs, and joined BBC Radio Suffolk as a summariser for their coverage of Ipswich Town games for the 2009–10 season. He spent four years as head of recruitment at Everton before taking on the role of head of European recruitment at Aston Villa in 2016.

In August 2019 he was working for Wolverhampton Wanderers as a scout.

== Managerial statistics ==
Managerial record by team and tenure
Team	From	To	Record					Refs
Team	From	To	P	W	D	L	Win %	Refs
Colchester United	1 June 1990	19 July 1991	51	30	11	10	58.8	
Cambridge United	4 December 1992	31 July 1993	29	7	10	12	24.1	
Doncaster Rovers	24 January 1994	1 July 1994	19	7	5	7	36.8	
Northampton Town	10 January 1995	7 October 1999	248	89	72	87	35.9	
Chester City	20 January 2000	31 May 2000	19	6	5	8	31.6	
Carlisle United	1 June 2000	12 July 2001	52	13	16	23	25.0	
Oxford United	23 November 2001	21 March 2004	122	47	35	40	38.5	
Bristol Rovers	26 April 2004	22 September 2005	68	21	26	21	30.9	
Torquay United	13 April 2006	4 December 2006	29	9	8	12	31.0	
Total			637	229	188	220	35.9	

== Honours ==
=== As a player ===
Shrewsbury Town

- Football League Third Division: 1978–79
- Welsh Cup: 1976–77, 1978–79
- Football League Fourth Division promotion: 1974–75

Everton

- Football League First Division: 1984–85
- FA Charity Shield: 1985
- European Cup Winners' Cup: 1984–85

Birmingham City

- Football League Third Division promotion: 1991–92

=== As a manager ===
Northampton Town

- Football League Third Division play-offs: 1997

Individual

- Football League Third Division Manager of the Month: December 2002, December 2003
- Football League Two Manager of the Month: April 2006
