= Roy Hunter =

English footballer

Personal information
- Full name: Roy Ian Hunter
- Date of birth: 29 October 1973 (age 52)
- Place of birth: Saltburn-by-the-Sea, England
- Height: 5 ft 10 in (1.78 m)
- Position: Midfielder

Youth career
- West Bromwich Albion

Senior career*
Years	Team	Apps	(Gls)
1991–1995	West Bromwich Albion	9	(1)
1995–2002	Northampton Town	177	(17)
2002	Nuneaton Borough		
2002–2003	Oxford United	17	(1)
2004	Northwich Victoria	4	(1)
2004–2005	Hucknall Town	82	(6)
2005–2008	Harrogate Town	1	(2)
2008–2012	Redcar Athletic		
2012	Marske United		

Managerial career
- 2011-2012: Redcar Athletic
- 2013-2014: Redcar Athletic (assistant)
- * Club domestic league appearances and goals as of 23.50, 24 June 2007 (UTC)

Roy Ian Hunter (born 29 October 1973) is an English former professional footballer. He started his career at West Bromwich Albion, before moving to Northampton Town where he made 177 Football League appearances. He then had a brief spell at Nuneaton Borough in the Conference before moving on to Oxford United in 2002, before joining Hucknall Town for their 2003–04 Northern Premier League championship season. He helped to guide Hucknall Town to the FA Trophy Final as player/coach. He signed for Harrogate Town in July 2005.

Hunter was the Harrogate Town captain at the start of the season but was replaced by Denny Ingram midway through the term.

Hunter signed on for Teesside Athletic for the start of the 2008–09 season, with the club becoming Redcar Athletic in 2010. In the summer of 2012 he joined Marske United as a player/coach, before returning to Redcar as assistant manager in October 2012.

== Honours ==
Northampton Town

- Football League Third Division play-offs: 1997
