= Christian Lee (footballer) =

English footballer

Personal information
- Date of birth: 8 October 1976 (age 50)
- Place of birth: Aylesbury, England
- Height: 1.83 m (6 ft 0 in)
- Positions: Striker; defender

Senior career*
Years	Team	Apps	(Gls)
1994–1995	Doncaster Rovers	0	(0)
1995–1999	Northampton Town	69	(10)
1999–2001	Gillingham	3	(0)
2000	→ Rochdale (loan)	5	(1)
2001	→ Leyton Orient (loan)	3	(0)
2001	Bristol Rovers	9	(2)
2001	Farnborough Town	5	(1)
2001	→ Rushden & Diamonds (loan)	1	
2001–2002	Eastwood Town	0	
2002–2003	Farnborough Town	35	(7)
2003–2005	Halifax Town	25	(6)
- * Club domestic league appearances and goals as of 00:08, 8 March 2008 (UTC)

Christian Lee (born 8 October 1976 in Aylesbury, England) is an English professional footballer. He made over 140 appearances in Football League and Football Conference between 1995 and 2005.

== Career ==
Lee started his career as a junior at Doncaster Rovers but made no appearances before joining Northampton Town in July 1995, for whom he made 69 league and cup appearances, scoring ten goals, in four seasons. He joined Gillingham in 1999 for £35,000 but a serious knee operation meant that he missed most of the 1999–2000 season and he joined Rochdale on a one-month loan in October 2000 with a view to a permanent move. However, he did not make an impact and Rochdale decided not to pursue the loan deal. He joined Leyton Orient on loan in March 2001 before signing for Bristol Rovers on a free transfer. Two months later in May 2001, he was released by manager Garry Thompson.

Lee moved into non-league football with Farnborough Town in September 2001. Later in the same month, he joined Rushden & Diamonds on loan for two months and then joined Eastwood Town on a free transfer in November 2001. He re-joined Farnborough Town in January 2002, for whom he scored seven goals in 36 appearances.

Lee joined Halifax Town in May 2003. Manager Chris Wilder said, "He is desperate to get back into League football, where he has spent the majority of his career. He is a very good technical player and one that possibly hasn't reached his potential." He scored six goals in 27 league and cup appearances but was released in April 2005 after missing the whole of the 2004–2005 season due to a recurrence of a chronic back problem in pre-season.

In 2006, Lee was signed up by the sports division of Chinese fashion label Giordano to model their new range of cycling shorts and other lycra sportswear.

== Honours ==
Northampton Town

- Football League Third Division play-offs: 1997
