= Sean Parrish =

Welsh footballer and coach (born 1972)

Personal information
- Date of birth: 14 March 1972 (age 54)
- Place of birth: Wrexham, Wales
- Height: 5 ft 10 in (1.78 m)
- Position: Midfielder

Team information
- Current team: Shrewsbury Town (first-team coach)

Senior career*
Years	Team	Apps	(Gls)
1989–1992	Shrewsbury Town	3	(1)
1992–1994	Telford United	90	(7)
1994–1996	Doncaster Rovers	66	(8)
1996–2000	Northampton Town	108	(42)
2000–2002	Chesterfield	55	(11)
2002–2004	Kidderminster Harriers	56	(8)
2004–2006	AFC Telford United	79	(7)
Total		457	(84)

Managerial career
- 2006: AFC Telford United (caretaker manager)
- 2010–?: Northampton Town (academy manager)
- 2012–2017: Wolverhampton Wanderers (youth coach)
- 2017–2018: AFC Telford United (assistant manager)
- 2018–2023: Wolverhampton Wanderers U23 (assistant)
- 2023–: Shrewsbury Town (first-team coach)
- 2024: Shrewsbury Town (caretaker)
- * Club domestic league appearances and goals

Sean Parrish (born 14 March 1972) is a Welsh footballer who played as a midfielder. His last first-team coaching role was at Shrewsbury Town.

He played in the Football League for Shrewsbury Town, Doncaster Rovers, Northampton Town, Chesterfield and Kidderminster Harriers. He won promotion from the fourth tier with Northampton in 1997 and Chesterfield in 2001.

As a coach, Parrish held positions at his former clubs Shrewsbury Town and AFC Telford United, including as caretaker manager at both. He also worked for several years in the youth ranks of Wolverhampton Wanderers.

== Playing career ==
Parrish began his career at Shrewsbury Town but played only a handful of games before joining non-league club Telford United. He moved to Doncaster Rovers in 1994 before joining Northampton Town two years later, for a fee of £35,000.

On 11 May 1997, Parrish scored the only goal of a Division Three play-off semi-final away to Cardiff City, advancing down the centre of the pitch from inside his own half before executing a lob over Steve Williams. Thirteen days later he played in the final, won by a single goal against another Welsh club Swansea City. He was part of the team that reached the Division Two play-off final the following season.

He then joined Chesterfield in 2000, where he won promotion in his first season but was limited by injury in his second. In 2002, he turned down a one-year extension at the Spireites to join Kidderminster Harriers on a two-year deal as manager Ian Britton's first signing.

Parrish joined the reformed AFC Telford United in 2004. In his first season back at the New Bucks Head, he scored the winning goal against Kendal Town in the playoff final to achieve promotion to the Northern Premier League Premier Division. He captained the club, made 115 appearances across both entities, and was inducted into the Bucks Hall of Fame in 2010.

== Coaching career ==
Parrish was the caretaker manager at AFC Telford United in 2006, between the tenures of Bernard McNally and Rob Smith. In 2010, he was academy head at Northampton Town. He returned to AFC Telford United in 2017 as assistant manager on a voluntary basis, serving under his cousin Rob Edwards.

After spending five years as an assistant manager at Wolverhampton Wanderers under-23 side, Parrish returned to Shrewsbury Town as first-team coach under head coach Matt Taylor in July 2023. When Paul Hurst was sacked on 3 November 2024, Parrish assumed the role of caretaker head coach for the first team; he lost away to relegation rivals Burton Albion in EFL League One and to Walsall in the EFL Trophy before the appointment of Gareth Ainsworth.

== Personal life ==
Parrish is the cousin of fellow former footballer and coach Rob Edwards.

== Honours ==
Northampton Town

- Football League Third Division play-offs: 1997
