= Ray Warburton =

English footballer

Personal information
- Full name: Raymond Warburton
- Date of birth: 7 October 1967 (age 59)
- Place of birth: Rotherham, England
- Height: 6 ft 0 in (1.83 m)
- Position: Defender

Senior career*
Years	Team	Apps	(Gls)
1985–1989	Rotherham United	4	(0)
1989–1994	York City	90	(9)
1994–1998	Northampton Town	169	(12)
1998–2002	Rushden & Diamonds	77	(3)
2002–2003	Boston United	22	(1)
2003–2005	Aldershot Town	79	(3)
Total		441	(28)
- * Club domestic league appearances and goals

Raymond Warburton (born 7 October 1967 in Rotherham, England) is an English former footballer.

== Playing career ==
Warburton started his career at hometown club Rotherham United, before moving on to York City in August 1989. At York he helped the club win promotion form the Third Division in 1992–93. In February 1994 he moved on to Northampton Town, where he again won promotion to the Second Division, this time via the play-offs in 1997. The following year he moved on to Rushden & Diamonds, where he lifted the Conference National title in 2000–01. After which he joined Boston United, who went on to lift the Conference title in 2001-02. In January 2003 he signed with Aldershot Town, helping them to lift the Isthmian League Premier Division title in 2002–03.

== Honours ==
Northampton Town

- Football League Third Division play-offs: 1997

Rushden & Diamonds

- Football Conference: 2000–01

Boston United

- Football Conference: 2001–02

Aldershot Town

- Isthmian League Premier Division: 2002–03
