= 1997 Football League play-offs =

Football League play-offs
- Season: 1996–97
- Champions: Crystal Palace (First Division); Crewe Alexandra (Second Division); Northampton Town (Third Division)
- Matches: 15
- Goals: 38 (2.53 per match)
- Biggest home win: Swansea 3–0 Chester (Third Division)
- Biggest away win: Bristol City 1–2 Brentford (Second Division)
- Highest scoring: Northampton 3–2 Cardiff (5 goals)
- Highest attendance: 64,383 – Crystal Palace v Sheffield United (First Division final)
- Lowest attendance: 5,104 – Chester v Swansea (Third Division semi-final)
- Average attendance: 21,403

The Football League play-offs for the 1996–97 season were held in May 1997, with the finals taking place at the old Wembley Stadium in London. The play-off semi-finals will be played over two legs and will be contested by the teams who finish in 3rd, 4th, 5th and 6th place in the Football League First Division and Football League Second Division and the 4th, 5th, 6th and 7th placed teams in the Football League Third Division table. The winners of the semi-finals will go through to the finals, with the winner of the matches gaining promotion for the following season.

== First Division ==
Pos	Team	Pld	W	D	L	GF	GA	GD	Pts
3	Wolverhampton Wanderers	46	22	10	14	68	51	+17	76
4	Ipswich Town	46	20	14	12	68	50	+18	74
5	Sheffield United	46	20	13	13	75	52	+23	73
6	Crystal Palace	46	19	14	13	78	48	+30	71

=== Semi-finals ===
First leg

10 May 1997
15:00

Crystal Palace	3–1	Wolverhampton Wanderers
Shipperley 68'; Freedman 89', 90'		Smith 90'

Selhurst Park, London
Attendance: 21,053
Referee: Neale Barry

10 May 1997
15:00

Sheffield United	1–1	Ipswich Town
Fjørtoft 41'		Stockwell 78'

Bramall Lane, Sheffield
Attendance: 22,312
Referee: Roy Pearson

Second leg

14 May 1997
19:45

Ipswich Town	2–2 (a.e.t.)	Sheffield United
Scowcroft 32'; Gudmundsson 73'		Kachura 9'; Walker 77'

Portman Road, Ipswich
Attendance: 21,467
Referee: Terry Heilbron

Ipswich Town 3–3 Sheffield United on aggregate. Sheffield United won on away goals.

14 May 1997
19:45

Wolverhampton Wanderers	2–1	Crystal Palace
Atkins 30'; Williams 85'		Hopkin 66'

Molineux, Wolverhampton
Attendance: 26,403
Referee: Clive Wilkes

Crystal Palace won 4–3 on aggregate.

=== Final ===
26 May 1997
15:00

Crystal Palace	1–0	Sheffield United
Hopkin 90'

Wembley Stadium, London
Attendance: 64,383
Referee: Neale Barry

== Second Division ==
Pos	Team	Pld	W	D	L	GF	GA	GD	Pts
3	Luton Town	46	21	15	10	59	41	+18	78
4	Brentford	46	20	14	12	56	43	+13	74
5	Bristol City	46	21	10	15	69	51	+18	73
6	Crewe Alexandra	46	22	7	17	56	47	+9	73

=== Semi-finals ===
First leg

11 May 1997
13:00

Bristol City	1–2	Brentford
Owers 28'		Smith 13'; Taylor 30'

Ashton Gate, Bristol
Attendance: 15,581

11 May 1997
15:00

Crewe Alexandra	2–1	Luton Town
Rivers 53'; Little 68'		Oldfield 3'

Gresty Road, Crewe
Attendance: 5,467

Second leg

14 May 1997
19:45

Brentford	2–1	Bristol City
Taylor 67'; Bent 79'		Barnard 49'

Griffin Park, London
Attendance: 9,496
Referee: John Kirkby

Brentford won 4–2 on aggregate.

14 May 1997
19:45

Luton Town	2–2	Crewe Alexandra
Oldfield 20', 31'		Little 32'; Smith 62'

Kenilworth Road, Luton
Attendance: 8,168
Referee: Roy Pearson

Crewe Alexandra won 4–3 on aggregate.

=== Final ===
25 May 1997
15:00

Brentford	0–1	Crewe Alexandra
		Smith 34'

Wembley Stadium, London
Attendance: 34,149
Referee: Uriah Rennie

== Third Division ==
Pos	Team	Pld	W	D	L	GF	GA	GD	Pts
4	Northampton Town	46	20	12	14	67	44	+23	72
5	Swansea City	46	21	8	17	62	58	+4	71
6	Chester City	46	18	16	12	55	43	+12	70
7	Cardiff City	46	20	9	17	56	54	+2	69

=== Semi-finals ===
First leg

11 May 1997
12:00

Cardiff City	0–1	Northampton Town
		Parrish 77'

Ninian Park, Cardiff
Attendance: 11,369

11 May 1997
15:00

Chester City	0–0	Swansea City

Deva Stadium, Chester
Attendance: 5,104

Second leg

14 May 1997
19:30

Swansea City	3–0	Chester City
Thomas 39'; Torpey 43'; Heggs 64'

Vetch Field, Swansea
Attendance: 10,027

Swansea City won 3–0 on aggregate.

14 May 1997
19:45

Northampton Town	3–2	Cardiff City
Sampson 23'; Warburton 68'; Gayle 77'		Fowler 36'; Haworth 90'

Sixfields, Northampton
Attendance: 7,302

Northampton Town won 4–2 on aggregate.

=== Final ===
24 May 1997
15:00

Northampton Town	1–0	Swansea City
Frain 90'

Wembley Stadium, London
Attendance: 46,804
Referee: Terry Heilbron
