= Ian Sampson =

English former footballer and manager

Personal information
- Date of birth: 14 November 1968 (age 57)
- Place of birth: Wakefield, England
- Position: Central defender

Team information
- Current team: Northampton Town (assistant head coach)

Youth career
- 1989–1990: Goole Town

Senior career*
Years	Team	Apps	(Gls)
1990–1994	Sunderland	21	(1)
1994	→ Northampton Town (loan)	8	(0)
1994–2004	Northampton Town	441	(29)
1995	→ Tottenham Hotspur (loan)	0	(0)
Total		470	(30)

Managerial career
- 2006–2007: Northampton Town (caretaker)
- 2009–2011: Northampton Town
- 2012: Corby Town
- 2024–2025: Northampton Town (caretaker)
- * Club domestic league appearances and goals as of 23:10, 30 January 2010 (UTC)

Ian Sampson (born 14 November 1968) is an English former footballer. He played as a defender for Goole Town, Sunderland, Northampton Town and Tottenham Hotspur. He is the assistant head coach at Northampton Town

== Playing career ==
In his playing days he was a central defender, beginning his professional career in 1990 when Sunderland signed him from non-league Goole Town. He only made 21 appearances in four years however, before joining Northampton in 1994 after a successful loan spell. He played for the Cobblers for 10 years, making 449 appearances, placing him second in the list of appearance makers behind Tommy Fowler. Sampson retired from the game at the end of the 2003–04 season. He had a brief loan spell at Tottenham in 1995, featuring in their makeshift squad for the Intertoto Cup. He even managed to score during Spurs' only victory in the campaign against NK Rudar Velenje.

== Managerial career ==
After retiring from playing, Sampson joined the Northampton youth team set-up as coach before being promoted to first-team coach in 2006. He was appointed as joint caretaker manager on 20 December 2006, following the resignation of John Gorman. On 2 January 2007, Northampton announced that former Southampton boss Stuart Gray had been appointed as the new manager, with Sampson and fellow caretaker Jim Barron staying on as first team coaches.

Following the sacking of Stuart Gray on 8 September 2009, Sampson was appointed as caretaker manager for the second time and on 5 October 2009 he was named Northampton manager until the end of the season.

Sampson won the League Two Manager of the Month award in January 2010, after Northampton won three and drew two of their five games. This was the first time a Northampton Manager had won the award since 2006.

Sampson was sacked by Northampton Town on 2 March 2011 following a run of 7 games without a win, ending in a 3–2 defeat by Burton Albion, leaving the Cobblers in 16th place in League Two. Sampson had received mixed reaction from the stands, with some supporters wanting a change, however he was one of the club's most popular managers and, notably, his team beat the Premier League side Liverpool at Anfield, on penalties, in the League Cup in September 2010. Northampton also beat Crewe 6–2 at Sixfields with debutant Shaun Harrad scoring.

On 9 March 2011 he confirmed he had applied for the vacant managerial post at Grimsby Town.

Sampson become the manager at Corby Town. one day after the club was taken over by businessman Kevin Ingram. However, after five straight defeat at the start of the 2012–13 season Sampson resigned as manager at Corby Town.

On 16 October 2019, Sampson returned to Northampton Town as the new Academy Manager, officially returning to the club he previously managed.

On 10 February 2021, Sampson became caretaker assistant manager along with Marc Richards after the sacking of Keith Curle.

In December 2024, following the resignation of Jon Brady, Sampson was once again appointed caretaker manager.

== Honours ==
=== As a player ===
Northampton Town

- Football League Third Division play-offs: 1997

=== As a manager ===
Individual

- Football League Two Manager of the Month: January 2010
