= 1997–98 West Ham United F.C. season =

English football team season

West Ham United F.C.
1997–98 season
- Chairman: Terry Brown
- Manager: Harry Redknapp
- Stadium: Boleyn Ground
- Premier League: 8th
- FA Cup: Sixth round
- League Cup: Quarter-final
- Top goalscorer: League: Hartson (15); All: Hartson (24)
- Highest home attendance: 25,909 (vs. Everton, 31 January)
- Lowest home attendance: 23,335 (vs. Crystal Palace, 3 December)
- Average home league attendance: 24,967

During the 1997–98 English football season, West Ham United F.C. competed in the FA Premier League.

== Season summary ==
West Ham United finished eighth in the Premier League in 1997–98. John Hartson was the club’s leading scorer, scoring 15 league goals and 24 in all competitions, while Paul Kitson also featured regularly in attack. Rio Ferdinand established himself in the first team during the season.

West Ham finished eighth with 56 points. They reached the sixth round of the FA Cup and the quarter-finals of the League Cup.

== Final league table ==
Pos	Team	Pld	W	D	L	GF	GA	GD	Pts	Qualification or relegation
6	Blackburn Rovers	38	16	10	12	57	52	+5	58	Qualification for the UEFA Cup first round (Note: Aston Villa was rewarded entry to the UEFA Cup through UEFA Fair Play ranking.)
7	Aston Villa	38	17	6	15	49	48	+1	57	Qualification for the UEFA Cup first round
8	West Ham United	38	16	8	14	56	57	−1	56	
9	Derby County	38	16	7	15	52	49	+3	55	
10	Leicester City	38	13	14	11	51	41	+10	53	

Source: Premier League
Rules for classification: 1) points; 2) goal difference; 3) number of goals scored.
Notes:

Results summary

Overall								Home						Away					
Pld	W	D	L	GF	GA	GD	Pts	W	D	L	GF	GA	GD	W	D	L	GF	GA	GD
38	16	8	14	56	57	−1	56	13	4	2	40	18	+22	3	4	12	16	39	−23

Source: 1997-98 FA Premier League table

Results by matchday

Match	1	2	3	4	5	6	7	8	9	10	11	12	13	14	15	16	17	18	19	20	21	22	23	24	25	26	27	28	29	30	31	32	33	34	35	36	37	38
Ground	A	H	A	A	H	A	H	A	H	A	H	A	A	A	H	H	A	H	A	H	A	H	A	H	A	A	H	H	H	H	A	H	A	H	H	A	A	H
Result	W	W	L	D	W	L	L	L	W	L	W	L	L	L	W	W	L	W	L	W	W	W	L	D	W	D	D	D	W	W	L	D	D	W	L	L	D	W
Position	2	3	7	5	3	6	6	10	7	9	8	11	13	15	12	10	10	10	10	8	8	7	8	8	8	8	8	8	8	7	7	7	8	6	7	10	9	8

Source: 11v11.com: 1997-98 West Ham United results
A = Away; H = Home; W = Win; D = Draw; L = Loss

== Results ==
West Ham United's score comes first

=== Legend ===
Win	Draw	Loss

=== FA Premier League ===
Date	Opponent	Venue	Result	Attendance	Scorers
9 August 1997	Barnsley	A	2–1	18,667	Hartson, Lampard
13 August 1997	Tottenham Hotspur	H	2–1	25,354	Hartson, Berkovic
23 August 1997	Everton	A	1–2	34,356	Watson (own goal)
27 August 1997	Coventry City	A	1–1	18,289	Kitson
30 August 1997	Wimbledon	H	3–1	24,516	Hartson, Rieper, Berkovic
13 September 1997	Manchester United	A	1–2	55,068	Hartson
20 September 1997	Newcastle United	H	0–1	25,884	
24 September 1997	Arsenal	A	0–4	38,012	
27 September 1997	Liverpool	H	2–1	25,908	Hartson, Berkovic
4 October 1997	Southampton	A	0–3	15,212	
18 October 1997	Bolton Wanderers	H	3–0	24,864	Berkovic, Hartson (2)
27 October 1997	Leicester City	A	1–2	20,201	Berkovic
9 November 1997	Chelsea	A	1–2	34,382	Hartson (pen)
23 November 1997	Leeds United	A	1–3	30,031	Lampard
29 November 1997	Aston Villa	H	2–1	24,976	Hartson (2)
3 December 1997	Crystal Palace	H	4–1	23,335	Hartson, Berkovic, Unsworth, Lomas
6 December 1997	Derby County	A	0–2	29,300	
13 December 1997	Sheffield Wednesday	H	1–0	24,344	Kitson
20 December 1997	Blackburn Rovers	A	0–3	21,653	
26 December 1997	Coventry City	H	1–0	24,532	Kitson
28 December 1997	Wimbledon	A	2–1	22,087	Kimble (own goal), Kitson
10 January 1998	Barnsley	H	6–0	23,714	Lampard, Abou (2), Moncur, Hartson, Lazaridis
17 January 1998	Tottenham Hotspur	A	0–1	30,284	
31 January 1998	Everton	H	2–2	25,909	Sinclair (2)
7 February 1998	Newcastle United	A	1–0	36,736	Lazaridis
21 February 1998	Bolton Wanderers	A	1–1	25,000	Sinclair
2 March 1998	Arsenal	H	0–0	25,717	
11 March 1998	Manchester United	H	1–1	25,892	Sinclair
14 March 1998	Chelsea	H	2–1	25,829	Sinclair, Unsworth
30 March 1998	Leeds United	H	3–0	24,107	Hartson, Abou, Pearce
4 April 1998	Aston Villa	A	0–2	39,372	
11 April 1998	Derby County	H	0–0	25,155	
13 April 1998	Sheffield Wednesday	A	1–1	28,036	Berkovic
18 April 1998	Blackburn Rovers	H	2–1	24,733	Hartson (2)
25 April 1998	Southampton	H	2–4	25,878	Sinclair, Lomas
2 May 1998	Liverpool	A	0–5	44,414	
5 May 1998	Crystal Palace	A	3–3	19,129	Lampard, Omoyinmi (2)
10 May 1998	Leicester City	H	4–3	25,781	Lampard, Abou (2), Sinclair

=== FA Cup ===
Round	Date	Opponent	Venue	Result	Attendance	Goalscorers
R3	3 January 1998	Emley	H	2–1	18,629	Lampard, Hartson
R4	24 January 1998	Manchester City	A	2–1	26,495	Berkovic, Lomas
R5	14 February 1998	Blackburn Rovers	H	2–2	25,729	Kitson, Berkovic
R5R	25 February 1998	Blackburn Rovers	A	1–1 (5–4 on pens)	21,972	Hartson
QF	8 March 1998	Arsenal	A	1–1	38,077	Pearce
QFR	17 March 1998	Arsenal	H	1–1 (3–4 on pens)	25,859	Hartson

=== League Cup ===
Round	Date	Opponent	Venue	Result	Attendance	Goalscorers
R2 1st Leg	16 September 1997	Huddersfield Town	A	0–1	8,525	
R2 2nd Leg	29 September 1997	Huddersfield Town	H	3–0 (won 3–1 on agg)	16,137	Hartson (3)
R3	15 October 1997	Aston Villa	H	3–0	20,360	Hartson (2), Lampard
R4	19 November 1997	Walsall	H	4–1	17,463	Lampard (3), Hartson
QF	6 January 1998	Arsenal	H	1–2	24,770	Abou

== Squad ==
Note: Flags indicate national team as defined under FIFA eligibility rules; some limited exceptions apply. Players may hold more than one non-FIFA nationality.

No.	Pos.	Nation	Player
1	GK	CZE	Luděk Mikloško
2	DF	ENG	Tim Breacker
3	DF	ENG	Julian Dicks (captain)
4	DF	ENG	Steve Potts
5	DF	ENG	Richard Hall
6	DF	ENG	David Unsworth
8	MF	ENG	Trevor Sinclair
9	FW	ENG	Paul Kitson
10	FW	WAL	John Hartson
11	MF	NIR	Steve Lomas
13	GK	ENG	Stephen Bywater
15	DF	ENG	Rio Ferdinand
16	MF	ENG	John Moncur
17	MF	AUS	Stan Lazaridis
18	MF	ENG	Frank Lampard
19	DF	ENG	Ian Pearce

No.	Pos.	Nation	Player
20	DF	ENG	Andrew Impey
21	GK	ENG	Les Sealey
22	GK	CAN	Craig Forrest
23	MF	ENG	Scott Mean
24	FW	FRA	Samassi Abou
25	MF	ENG	Lee Hodges
26	DF	FRA	Mohamed Berthé
27	FW	NGA	Emmanuel Omoyinmi
28	DF	AUS	Chris Coyne
29	MF	ISR	Eyal Berkovic
30	DF	ENG	Joey Keith
31	GK	ENG	Neil Finn
32	GK	FRA	Bernard Lama
33	FW	IRL	Lee Boylan
34	FW	ENG	Gary Alexander

=== Left club during season ===
Note: Flags indicate national team as defined under FIFA eligibility rules; some limited exceptions apply. Players may hold more than one non-FIFA nationality.

No.	Pos.	Nation	Player
7	MF	ENG	Ian Bishop (to Manchester City)
8	DF	DEN	Marc Rieper (to Celtic)
12	DF	NIR	Keith Rowland (to Queens Park Rangers)
13	DF	FRA	David Terrier (to Newcastle United)

No.	Pos.	Nation	Player
14	FW	NIR	Iain Dowie (to Queens Park Rangers)
24	MF	NIR	Michael Hughes (to Wimbledon)
30	FW	ENG	Ian Moore (to Nottingham Forest)
30	FW	POR	Paulo Alves (to Sporting Lisbon)

=== Reserve squad ===
Note: Flags indicate national team as defined under FIFA eligibility rules; some limited exceptions apply. Players may hold more than one non-FIFA nationality.

No.	Pos.	Nation	Player
-	MF	ENG	Jimmy Bullard
-	MF	ENG	Craig Etherington

No.	Pos.	Nation	Player
-	DF	ENG	Anthony Henry
-	DF	WAL	David Partridge

== Transfers ==
=== In ===
Date	Pos	Name	From	Fee
2 June 1997	MF	Eyal Berkovic	Maccabi Haifa	£1,750,000
9 July 1997	DF	David Terrier	Metz	Free transfer
21 July 1997	GK	Craig Forrest	Ipswich Town	£500,000
15 August 1997	DF	David Unsworth	Everton	Swap
18 September 1997	DF	Ian Pearce	Blackburn Rovers	£2,300,000
26 September 1997	DF	Andrew Impey	QPR	£1,200,000
28 October 1997	FW	Samassi Abou	Cannes	£250,000
29 January 1998	MF	Trevor Sinclair	QPR	£2,300,000
20 February 1998	GK	Stephen Bywater	Rochdale	£300,000

=== Out ===
Date	Pos	Name	To	Fee
14 May 1997	DF	Slaven Bilić	Everton	£4,500,000
15 August 1997	MF	Danny Williamson	Everton	Swap
12 September 1997	DF	Marc Rieper	Celtic	£1,400,000
25 September 1997	MF	Michael Hughes	Wimbledon	£1,600,000
29 January 1998	DF	Keith Rowland	QPR	Swap
29 January 1998	FW	Iain Dowie	QPR	£1,600,000
26 March 1998	MF	Ian Bishop	Manchester City	Free transfer

Transfers in: ▼£8,600,000
Transfers out: ▲£7,500,000
Total spending: ▼£1,100,000

== Statistics ==
=== Appearances and goals ===
No.	Pos	Nat	Player	Total		FA Premier League		FA Cup		League Cup	
No.	Pos	Nat	Player	Apps	Goals	Apps	Goals	Apps	Goals	Apps	Goals
Goalkeepers
1	GK	(Czech Republic) CZE	Luděk Mikloško	15	0	13	0	0	0	2	0
22	GK	(Canada) CAN	Craig Forrest	21	0	14	0	4	0	3	0
32	GK	(France) FRA	Bernard Lama	14	0	12	0	2	0	0	0
Defenders
2	DF	(England) ENG	Tim Breacker	26	0	18+1	0	2+1	0	4	0
4	DF	(England) ENG	Steve Potts	33	0	15+9	0	4+1	0	3+1	0
6	DF	(England) ENG	David Unsworth	42	2	33	2	4	0	5	0
15	DF	(England) ENG	Rio Ferdinand	47	0	36	0	6	0	5	0
19	DF	(England) ENG	Ian Pearce	40	2	31	1	6	1	3	0
20	DF	(England) ENG	Andrew Impey	26	0	19+1	0	3	0	3	0
Midfielders
8	MF	(England) ENG	Trevor Sinclair	14	7	14	7	0	0	0	0
11	MF	(Northern Ireland) NIR	Steve Lomas	43	3	34	2	5	1	4	0
16	MF	(England) ENG	John Moncur	25	1	18+3	1	2+1	0	1	0
17	MF	(Australia) AUS	Stan Lazaridis	35	2	27+1	2	6	0	1	0
18	MF	(England) ENG	Frank Lampard	43	10	28+4	5	6	1	5	4
23	MF	(England) ENG	Scott Mean	3	0	0+3	0	0	0	0	0
25	MF	(England) ENG	Lee Hodges	5	0	0+2	0	0+3	0	0	0
29	MF	(Israel) ISR	Eyal Berkovic	47	9	35+1	7	6	2	5	0
Forwards
9	FW	(England) ENG	Paul Kitson	17	5	12+1	4	2	1	2	0
10	FW	(Wales) WAL	John Hartson	43	24	33	15	5	3	5	6
24	FW	(France) FRA	Samassi Abou	27	6	12+8	5	3+2	0	1+1	1
27	FW	(Nigeria) NGA	Emmanuel Omoyinmi	5	2	1+4	2	0	0	0	0
Players who left the club permanently or on loan during the season
7	MF	(England) ENG	Ian Bishop	4	0	3	0	0	0	0+1	0
8	DF	(Denmark) DEN	Marc Rieper	5	1	5	1	0	0	0	0
12	DF	(Northern Ireland) NIR	Keith Rowland	9	0	6+1	0	0	0	0+2	0
13	DF	(France) FRA	David Terrier	1	0	0+1	0	0	0	0	0
14	FW	(Northern Ireland) NIR	Iain Dowie	17	0	8+5	0	0+1	0	2+1	0
24	MF	(Northern Ireland) NIR	Michael Hughes	6	0	2+3	0	0	0	1	0
30	FW	(England) ENG	Ian Moore	1	0	0+1	0	0	0	0	0
30	FW	(Portugal) POR	Paulo Alves	4	0	0+4	0	0	0	0	0
