= 2000–01 West Ham United F.C. season =

English football team season

West Ham United F.C.
2000–01 season
- Chairman: Terry Brown
- Manager: Harry Redknapp (until 9 May); Glenn Roeder (caretaker from 9 May)
- Stadium: Upton Park
- Premier League: 15th
- FA Cup: Quarter-finals
- League Cup: Fourth round
- Top goalscorer: League: Frédéric Kanouté (11); All: Frédéric Kanouté (14)
- Highest home attendance: 26,048 vs Tottenham Hotspur (31 Jan 2001, Premier League)
- Lowest home attendance: 11,963 vs Walsall (27 Sep 2000, League Cup)
- Average home league attendance: 25,697
Home colours	Away colours	Third colours

During the 2000–01 English football season, West Ham United competed in the FA Premier League.

== Season summary ==
The sale of Rio Ferdinand to Leeds United contributed towards a dip in West Ham's otherwise good Premier League form, seeing them 8th by Boxing Day, and mystery surrounded the departure of manager Harry Redknapp on 9 May following a row with chairman Terry Brown over transfer cash for what the club needed to challenge for a top six finish next season. Alan Curbishley, Steve McClaren and George Graham were just some of the many names linked with the vacancy before it was announced that caretaker manager and former youth coach Glenn Roeder would be taking over on a permanent basis.

== Final league table ==
Pos	Team	Pld	W	D	L	GF	GA	GD	Pts
13	Leicester City	38	14	6	18	39	51	−12	48
14	Middlesbrough	38	9	15	14	44	44	0	42
15	West Ham United	38	10	12	16	45	50	−5	42
16	Everton	38	11	9	18	45	59	−14	42
17	Derby County	38	10	12	16	37	59	−22	42

Source: Premier League
Rules for classification: 1) points; 2) goal difference; 3) number of goals scored.

Results summary

Overall								Home						Away					
Pld	W	D	L	GF	GA	GD	Pts	W	D	L	GF	GA	GD	W	D	L	GF	GA	GD
38	10	12	16	45	50	−5	42	6	6	7	24	20	+4	4	6	9	21	30	−9

Source: 2000-01 FA Premier League table

Results by matchday

Match	1	2	3	4	5	6	7	8	9	10	11	12	13	14	15	16	17	18	19	20	21	22	23	24	25	26	27	28	29	30	31	32	33	34	35	36	37	38
Ground	A	H	H	A	A	H	A	H	A	H	H	A	H	A	A	H	H	A	A	H	A	H	A	H	A	H	A	A	H	H	H	A	H	A	H	A	H	A
Result	L	L	D	D	L	D	W	D	D	L	W	D	W	W	W	W	D	D	L	W	L	L	D	D	L	D	W	L	L	L	L	D	W	L	L	L	W	L
Position	16	20	20	20	20	20	18	17	18	18	15	15	13	11	9	6	7	8	10	8	10	11	11	13	14	14	13	13	13	14	14	14	13	14	14	15	14	15

Source: 11v11.com: 2000-01 West Ham United results
A = Away; H = Home; W = Win; D = Draw; L = Loss

== Results ==
=== FA Premier League ===
19 August 2000 1	Chelsea	4-2	West Ham United	Fulham, London
20:00 BST	Hasselbaink 31' (pen.); Panucci (yellow card) 33'; Zola 59'; Stanić 78', 90'		Lampard (yellow card) 12'; Hislop (yellow card) 30'; Di Canio 48'; Kanouté 85'; Margas (yellow card) 89'	Stadium: Stamford Bridge; Attendance: 34,914; Referee: Graham Barber

23 August 2000 2	West Ham United	0-1	Leicester City	London
20:00 BST	Štimac (yellow card) 22' (red card) 44'; Carrick (yellow card) 87'; Di Canio (yellow card) 89'		Taggart (yellow card) 34'; Izzet (yellow card) 42'; Eadie 54' (yellow card) 81'	Stadium: Boleyn Ground; Attendance: 25,195; Referee: Rob Styles

26 August 2000 3	West Ham United	2-2	Manchester United	London
15:00 BST	Šuker (yellow card) 72' (goal) 89'; Di Canio 86' (pen.)		Beckham 6'; Cole 49'	Stadium: Boleyn Ground; Attendance: 25,195; Referee: Dermot Gallagher

6 September 2000 4	Sunderland	1-1	West Ham United	Sunderland
15:00 BST	Arca 25'; Phillips (yellow card) 57'; Hutchison (yellow card) 85'		Winterburn (yellow card) 14'; Šuker (yellow card) 29' (goal) 32'	Stadium: Stadium of Light; Attendance: 46,605; Referee: Peter Jones

11 September 2000 5	Tottenham Hotspur	1-0	West Ham United	Tottenham, London
20:00 BST	Campbell 67'; Freund (yellow card) 77'		Šuker 32' (yellow card) 66'; Lampard (yellow card) 62'; Pearce (yellow card) 87'	Stadium: White Hart Lane; Attendance: 33,282; Referee: Steve Dunn

17 September 2000 6	West Ham United	1-1	Liverpool	London
15:00 BST	Di Canio 69' (pen.)		Gerrard 12'; Murphy (yellow card) 41'; Song (yellow card) 85'	Stadium: Boleyn Ground; Attendance: 25,998; Referee: David Elleray

23 September 2000 7	Coventry City	0-3	West Ham United	Coventry
15:00 BST			Di Canio 38'; Cole 40'; Winterburn (yellow card) 65'; Lampard 69'	Stadium: Highfield Road; Attendance: 21,020; Referee: Neale Barry

30 September 2000 8	West Ham United	1-1	Bradford City	London
15:00 BST	Cole 26'; Pearce (yellow card) 52'; Di Canio (yellow card) 89'; Štimac (yellow card) 90'		Windass (yellow card) 32'; Wetherall (yellow card) 37'; Petrescu 90'	Stadium: Boleyn Ground; Attendance: 25,407; Referee: Mike Dean

14 October 2000 9	Ipswich Town	1-1	West Ham United	Ipswich
15:00 BST	Stewart 5'		Pearce (yellow card) 13'; Kanouté (yellow card) 60'; Di Canio 73'; Cole (yellow card) 87'	Stadium: Portman Road; Attendance: 22,243; Referee: Neale Barry

21 October 2000 10	West Ham United	1-2	Arsenal	London
15:00 BST	Moncur (yellow card) 44'; Pearce 56'		Pires 12'; Ferdinand (o.g.)	Stadium: Boleyn Ground; Attendance: 26,034; Referee: Dermot Gallagher

28 October 2000 11	West Ham United	1-0	Newcastle United	London
15:00 BST	Winterburn (yellow card) 39'; Kanouté 73'; Moncur (yellow card) 89'; Šuker (yellow card) 90'		Solano (yellow card) 44'; LuaLua (yellow card) 57'	Stadium: Boleyn Ground; Attendance: 26,044; Referee: Mike Riley

7 November 2000 12	Derby County	0-0	West Ham United	Derby
15:00 BST	Martin (yellow card) 42'		Kanouté (yellow card) 49'	Stadium: Pride Park Stadium; Attendance: 24,621; Referee: Paul Durkin

11 November 2000 13	West Ham United	4-1	Manchester City	London
15:00 BST	Winterburn (yellow card) 39'; Lomas 53'; Sinclair 58'; Pearce 67'; Di Canio 90' (pen.)		Prior 32'	Stadium: Boleyn Ground; Attendance: 26,022; Referee: Jeff Winter

18 November 2000 14	Leeds United	0-1	West Ham United	Leeds
15:00 BST	Mills (yellow card) 33'		Winterburn 45'; Lomas (yellow card) 88'	Stadium: Elland Road; Attendance: 40,005; Referee: Paul Taylor

25 November 2000 15	Southampton	2-3	West Ham United	Southampton
15:00 BST	El Khalej (yellow card) 12'; Oakley 20'; Beattie 53'		Winterburn (yellow card) 16'; Štimac (yellow card) 32'; Kanouté 41'; Pearce 43'; Sinclair 69'	Stadium: The Dell; Attendance: 15,232; Referee: Steve Bennett

2 December 2000 16	West Ham United	1-0	Middlesbrough	London
15:00 BST	Di Canio 42'; Moncur (yellow card) 47'		Fleming (yellow card) 38'; Ehiogu (yellow card) 43' (red card) 87'; Mustoe (yellow card) 80'; Ince (yellow card) 82'	Stadium: Boleyn Ground; Attendance: 25,459; Referee: Andy D'Urso

9 December 2000 17	West Ham United	1-1	Aston Villa	London
15:00 BST	Pearce (yellow card) 12'; Carrick 15'		Özalan (yellow card) 24'; Hendrie 37'; Barry (yellow card) 75'; Ginola (yellow card) 80'	Stadium: Boleyn Ground; Attendance: 25,888; Referee: Mike Riley

16 December 2000 18	Everton	1-1	West Ham United	Liverpool
15:00 BST	Cadamarteri (yellow card) 23' (goal) 75'		Kanouté (yellow card) 30' (goal) 83'; Lomas (yellow card) 78'	Stadium: Goodison Park; Attendance: 31,260; Referee: Clive Wilkes

23 December 2000 19	Leicester City	2-1	West Ham United	Leicester
15:00 BST	Taggart (yellow card) 12'; Izzet 26'; Savage 63'		Kanouté 8'	Stadium: Filbert Street; Attendance: 21,524; Referee: Graham Poll

26 December 2000 20	West Ham United	5-0	Charlton Athletic	London
15:00 BST	Rufus 13' (o.g.); Kanouté 18' 84'; Lomas (yellow card) 32'; Lampard 45'; Sinclair 71'			Stadium: Boleyn Ground; Attendance: 26,046; Referee: Steve Dunn

1 January 2001 21	Manchester United	3-1	West Ham United	Manchester
15:00 BST	Solskjær 3'; Pearce 33' (o.g.); Brown (yellow card) 53'; Yorke 58'		Pearce (yellow card) 13'; Camara (yellow card) 37'; Kanouté 72'	Stadium: Old Trafford; Attendance: 67,603; Referee: Peter Jones

13 January 2001 22	West Ham United	0-2	Sunderland	London
15:00 BST	Lomas (yellow card) 6'; Winterburn (yellow card) 38'; Pearce (yellow card) 53'; Song (yellow card) 85'		Varga 22'; Quinn (yellow card) 35'; Phillips (yellow card) 64'; Hutchison 68'	Stadium: Boleyn Ground; Attendance: 26,014; Referee: Matt Messias

23 January 2001 23	Charlton Athletic	1-1	West Ham United	London
15:00 BST	Bartlett 7'		Di Canio 74' (yellow card) 89'	Stadium: The Valley; Attendance: 20,043; Referee: Dermot Gallagher

31 January 2001 24	West Ham United	0-0	Tottenham Hotspur	London
15:00 BST	Tihinen (yellow card)		Perry (yellow card)	Stadium: Boleyn Ground; Attendance: 26,048; Referee: Neale Barry

3 February 2001 25	Liverpool	3-0	West Ham United	Liverpool
15:00 BST	Šmicer 20'; Fowler 45' 57'		Kanouté (yellow card) 73'	Stadium: Anfield; Attendance: 44,045; Referee: Steve Bennett

12 February 2001 26	West Ham United	1-1	Coventry City	London
15:00 BST	Cole (yellow card) 71' (goal) 83'; Di Canio (yellow card) 80'		Breen (yellow card) 11'; Quinn (yellow card) 18'; Hartson (yellow card) 54'; Thompson (yellow card) 58'; Eustace (yellow card) 84'; Dailly 90' (o.g.)	Stadium: Boleyn Ground; Attendance: 22,586; Referee: Dermot Gallagher

24 February 2001 27	Bradford City	1-2	West Ham United	Bradford
15:00 BST	Locke (yellow card) 32'; Jess 62'		Lampard 18' 75'; Dailly (yellow card) 29'; Di Canio (yellow card) 64'	Stadium: Valley Parade; Attendance: 20,469; Referee: Stephen Lodge

3 March 2001 28	Arsenal	3-0	West Ham United	London
15:00 BST	Wiltord 6', 13', 39'; Vieira (yellow card) 69'; Lauren (yellow card) 81'		Pearce (yellow card) 28'; Dailly (yellow card) 77'; Todorov (yellow card) 83'	Stadium: Highbury; Attendance: 38,071; Referee: Mike Riley

7 March 2001 29	West Ham United	0-2	Chelsea	London
15:00 BST	Lampard (yellow card) 17'; Šuker (yellow card) 67'		Ferrer (yellow card) 26'; Guðjohnsen 32'; Hasselbaink 38'; Grønkjær (yellow card) 65'	Stadium: Boleyn Ground; Attendance: 26,016; Referee: Alan Wiley

17 March 2001 30	West Ham United	0-1	Ipswich Town	London
15:00 BST			Reuser 60'	Stadium: Boleyn Ground; Attendance: 26,046; Referee: Mike Dean

31 March 2001 31	West Ham United	0-2	Everton	London
15:00 BST	Pearce (yellow card) 44' (red card) 45'; Di Canio (yellow card) 45'; Kanouté (yellow card) 68'		Unsworth 45' (pen.) (yellow card) 58'; Ball (yellow card) 52'; Alexandersson 72'	Stadium: Boleyn Ground; Attendance: 26,044; Referee: Andy D'Urso

7 April 2001 32	Aston Villa	2-2	West Ham United	Birmingham
15:00 BST	Ginola (yellow card) 65' (goal) 71'; Hendrie 78'		Song (yellow card) 45'; Kanouté 46'; Lampard 87'; Cole (yellow card) 90'	Stadium: Villa Park; Attendance: 31,432; Referee: Rob Harris

14 April 2001 33	West Ham United	3-1	Derby County	London
15:00 BST	Kanouté 4'; Lampard 7'; Cole 45'		Eranio (yellow card) 26'; West (yellow card) 55'; Guðjónsson 83'	Stadium: Boleyn Ground; Attendance: 25,319; Referee: Rob Styles

16 April 2001 34	Newcastle United	2-1	West Ham United	Newcastle
15:00 BST	Cort 32'; Solano 56' (pen.)		Dailly (yellow card) 66'; Lampard 80' (pen.)	Stadium: St James' Park; Attendance: 51,107; Referee: Paul Durkin

21 April 2001 35	West Ham United	0-2	Leeds United	London
15:00 BST	Moncur (yellow card) 36'; Cole (yellow card) 51'; Foxe (yellow card) 57'; Štimac (yellow card) 64'; Winterburn (yellow card) 72'		Keane 8'; Mills (yellow card) 23'; Ferdinand 47'; Dacourt (yellow card) 58'; Batty (red card) 58'	Stadium: Boleyn Ground; Attendance: 26,041; Referee: Graham Poll

28 April 2001 36	Manchester City	1-0	West Ham United	Manchester
15:00 BST	Pearce 23' (own goal); Haaland (yellow card) 64'; Howey (yellow card) 67'; Tiatto (yellow card) 82'		Cole (yellow card) 39'; Dailly (yellow card) 53'; Pearce (yellow card) 63'; Carrick (yellow card) 82'; Šuker (yellow card) 90'	Stadium: Maine Road; Attendance: 33,737; Referee: Peter Jones

5 May 2001 37	West Ham United	3-0	Southampton	London
15:00 BST	Pearce (yellow card) 34'; Foxe (yellow card) 57'; Cole 59'; Di Canio 70'; Kanouté 90'		Lundekvam (yellow card) 12'; Davies (yellow card) 35'	Stadium: Boleyn Ground; Attendance: 26,041; Referee: Clive Wilkes

19 May 2001 38	Middlesbrough	2-1	West Ham United	Middlesbrough
15:00 BST	Job 21'; Karembeu 45'		Todorov 31'	Stadium: Riverside Stadium; Attendance: 33,057; Referee: Paul Durkin

=== FA Cup ===
Round	Date	Opponent	Venue	Result	Attendance	Goalscorers
R3	6 January 2001	Walsall	A	3–2	9,402	Lampard, Kanouté (2)
R4	28 January 2001	Manchester United	A	1–0	67,029	Di Canio
R5	17 February 2001	Sunderland	A	1–0	36,005	Kanouté
QF	11 March 2001	Tottenham Hotspur	H	2–3	26,048	S Pearce, Todorov

=== League Cup ===
Round	Date	Opponent	Venue	Result	Attendance	Goalscorers
R2 1st Leg	19 September 2000	Walsall	A	1–0	5,435	Defoe
R2 2nd Leg	27 September 2000	Walsall	H	1–1 (won 2–1 on agg)	11,963	Lomas
R3	31 October 2000	Blackburn Rovers	H	2–0	21,863	Šuker, Di Canio
R4	29 November 2000	Sheffield Wednesday	H	1–2	25,853	Lampard

== First-team squad ==
Squad at end of season

Note: Flags indicate national team as defined under FIFA eligibility rules; some limited exceptions apply. Players may hold more than one non-FIFA nationality.

No.	Pos.	Nation	Player
1	GK	TRI	Shaka Hislop
2	DF	ENG	Gary Charles
3	DF	ENG	Stuart Pearce
4	DF	ENG	Steve Potts
5	DF	CRO	Igor Štimac
6	DF	AUS	Hayden Foxe
7	DF	SCO	Christian Dailly
8	MF	ENG	Trevor Sinclair
9	FW	CRO	Davor Šuker
10	FW	ITA	Paolo Di Canio
11	MF	NIR	Steve Lomas (captain)
12	FW	ENG	Paul Kitson
14	FW	FRA	Frédéric Kanouté
15	DF	CMR	Rigobert Song
16	MF	ENG	John Moncur
17	DF	ENG	Nigel Winterburn

No.	Pos.	Nation	Player
18	MF	ENG	Frank Lampard
19	DF	ENG	Ian Pearce
20	DF	ENG	Scott Minto
21	MF	ENG	Michael Carrick
22	GK	CAN	Craig Forrest
24	MF	FRA	Christian Bassila (on loan from Rennes)
25	FW	GUI	Kaba Diawara (on loan from Paris Saint-Germain)
26	MF	ENG	Joe Cole
29	FW	GUI	Titi Camara
30	DF	FRA	Sébastien Schemmel (on loan from Metz)
32	GK	ENG	Stephen Bywater
35	FW	ENG	Jermain Defoe
36	DF	NOR	Ragnvald Soma
37	FW	BUL	Svetoslav Todorov
45	MF	NIR	Grant McCann

=== Left club during season ===
Note: Flags indicate national team as defined under FIFA eligibility rules; some limited exceptions apply. Players may hold more than one non-FIFA nationality.

No.	Pos.	Nation	Player
7	MF	FRA	Marc Keller (on loan to Blackburn Rovers)
15	DF	ENG	Rio Ferdinand (to Leeds United)
28	DF	ENG	Darren Peacock (on loan from Blackburn Rovers)
28	DF	FIN	Hannu Tihinen (on loan from Viking)

No.	Pos.	Nation	Player
30	DF	CHI	Javier Margas (retired)
43	GK	IRL	Alex O'Reilly (to Bristol Rovers)
—	MF	FIN	Daniel Sjölund (to Liverpool)

=== Reserve squad ===
Note: Flags indicate national team as defined under FIFA eligibility rules; some limited exceptions apply. Players may hold more than one non-FIFA nationality.

No.	Pos.	Nation	Player
23	MF	ENG	Adam Newton
27	DF	IRL	Shaun Byrne
31	FW	TUR	Omer Riza
33	DF	ENG	Terrell Forbes
34	DF	ENG	Stevland Angus
39	DF	ENG	Ezomo Iriekpen
—	DF	ENG	Tom Williams
—	DF	AUS	Steve Laurie
—	DF	ITA	Alessandro Zamperini
—	MF	ENG	Leon Britton

No.	Pos.	Nation	Player
—	MF	ENG	Jimmy Bullard
—	MF	ENG	Craig Etherington
—	MF	ENG	Tom Williams
—	MF	IRL	Daryl McMahon
—	MF	AUS	Michael Ferrante
—	FW	ENG	Amos Foyewa
—	FW	ENG	Gavin Holligan
—	FW	UGA	Moses Junju
—	FW	AUS	Richard Garcia

== Transfers ==
=== In ===
Date	Pos	Name	From	Fee	Notes
22 June 2000	DF	Nigel Winterburn	Arsenal	Signed	
28 June 2000	FW	Davor Šuker	Arsenal	Free transfer	
28 November 2000	DF	Rigobert Song	Liverpool	£2,500,000	
21 December 2000	FW	Titi Camara	Liverpool	£1,500,000	
17 January 2001	DF	Ragnvald Soma	Bryne FK	£800,000	
18 January 2001	DF	Christian Dailly	Blackburn Rovers	£1,750,000	
22 January 2001	FW	Svetoslav Todorov	PFC Litex Lovech	£500,000	
14 March 2001	DF	Hayden Foxe	Sanfrecce Hiroshima	Free transfer	

=== Out ===
Date	Pos	Name	To	Fee	Notes
2 June 2000	DF	Stephen Purches	Bournemouth	Free transfer	
23 June 2000	FW	Emmanuel Omoyinmi	Oxford United	Free transfer	
23 June 2000	GK	Ian Feuer	Wimbledon	Free transfer	
27 July 2000	DF	Neil Ruddock	Crystal Palace	Signed	
7 August 2000	FW	Gary Alexander	Swindon Town	£200,000	
8 August 2000	FW	Paulo Wanchope	Manchester City	£3,650,000	
25 November 2000	DF	Rio Ferdinand	Leeds United	£18,000,000	
29 November 2000	MF	Daniel Sjölund	Liverpool	£1,000,000	
22 March 2001	MF	Tom Williams	Peterborough United	Free transfer	
22 March 2001	GK	Alex O'Reilly	Bristol Rovers	Monthly	
10 May 2001	MF	Jimmy Bullard	Peterborough United	Free transfer	

Transfers in: ▼£7,050,000
Transfers out: ▲£22,850,000
Total spending: ▲£15,800,000

== Statistics ==
=== Appearances, goals and cards ===
(Starting appearances + substitute appearances)

No.	Pos.	Name	League		FA Cup		League Cup		Total		Discipline	
No.	Pos.	Name	Apps	Goals	Apps	Goals	Apps	Goals	Apps	Goals	Yellow card	Red card
1	GK	(Trinidad and Tobago) Shaka Hislop	34	0	4	0	4	0	42	0	1	0
2	DF	(England) Gary Charles	0+1	0	0	0	0	0	0+1	0	0	0
3	DF	(England) Stuart Pearce	34	2	4	1	4	0	42	3	11	1
4	DF	(England) Steve Potts	2+6	0	0	0	2+1	0	4+7	0	0	0
5	DF	(Croatia) Igor Štimac	19	0	2	0	3	0	24	0	3	1
6	DF	(Australia) Hayden Foxe	3+2	0	0	0	0	0	3+2	0	2	0
7	DF	(Scotland) Christian Dailly	11+1	0	3	0	0	0	14+1	0	4	0
7	MF	(France) Marc Keller	0	0	0	0	1	0	1	0	0	0
8	MF	(England) Trevor Sinclair	19	3	1	0	3	0	23	3	0	0
9	FW	(Croatia) Davor Šuker	7+4	2	0	0	1+1	1	8+5	3	5	0
10	FW	(Italy) Paolo Di Canio	31	9	3	1	3	1	37	11	7	0
11	MF	(Northern Ireland) Steve Lomas	20	1	0	0	3	1	23	2	4	0
12	FW	(England) Paul Kitson	0+2	0	0	0	0	0	0+2	0	0	0
14	FW	(Mali) Frédéric Kanouté	32	11	4	3	3	0	39	14	5	0
15	DF	(England) Rio Ferdinand	12	0	2	0	0	0	14	0	0	0
15	DF	(Cameroon) Rigobert Song	18+1	0	1	0	1	0	20+1	0	2	0
16	MF	(England) John Moncur	6+10	0	0	0	0+1	0	6+11	0	5	0
17	DF	(England) Nigel Winterburn	33	1	4	0	3	0	40	1	7	0
18	MF	(England) Frank Lampard	30	7	4	1	3	1	37	9	3	0
19	DF	(England) Ian Pearce	13+2	1	0+1	0	1	0	14+3	1	0	0
20	DF	(England) Scott Minto	1	0	0	0	0	0	1	0	0	0
21	MF	(England) Michael Carrick	32+1	1	4	0	4	0	40+1	1	2	0
22	GK	(Canada) Craig Forrest	3+1	0	0	0	0	0	3+1	0	0	0
24	MF	(France) Christian Bassila	0+3	0	0+1	0	0	0	0+4	0	0	0
25	FW	(Guinea) Kaba Diawara	6+5	0	0	0	0	0	6+5	0	0	0
26	MF	(England) Joe Cole	24+6	5	4	0	2	0	30+6	5	5	0
28	DF	(Finland) Hannu Tihinen	5+3	0	2	0	0	0	7+3	0	1	0
29	FW	(Guinea) Titi Camara	5+1	0	1	0	0	0	6+1	0	1	0
30	DF	(Chile) Javier Margas	3	0	0	0	1	0	4	0	1	0
30	DF	(France) Sébastien Schemmel	10+2	0	3	0	0	0	13+2	0	1	0
32	GK	(England) Stephen Bywater	1	0	0	0	0	0	1	0	0	0
35	FW	(England) Jermain Defoe	0+1	0	0	0	0+1	1	0+2	1	0	0
36	DF	(Norway) Ragnvald Soma	2+2	0	0+1	0	0	0	2+3	0	0	0
37	FW	(Bulgaria) Svetoslav Todorov	2+6	1	0+1	1	0	0	2+7	2	1	0
45	MF	(Northern Ireland) Grant McCann	0+1	0	0	0	0	0	0+1	0	0	0
