= Anthony Henry =

Anthony or Tony Henry is the name of:

- Anthony Henry (American football), cornerback
- Anthony Henry (athlete) (born 1967), Antigua and Barbuda Olympic sprinter
- Tony Henry (footballer, born 1957), retired English midfielder who played for Bolton Wanderers, Manchester City, Oldham Athletic, Shrewsbury Town and Stoke City
- Tony Henry (footballer, born 1979), retired English defender who played for West Ham United and Lincoln City
- Tony Henry (singer), English opera singer
- Tony Henry (drummer), Australian drummer of The Cockroaches and additional musician of The Wiggles
- Anthony Henry (printer), Canadian printer and publisher
- Anthony Henry (wrestler), American professional wrestler

== See also ==
- Henry Anthony (disambiguation)
