= Henry Anthony =

Henry Anthony may refer to:

- Henry B. Anthony (1815–1884), US newspaperman and politician
- Henry Anthony (cricketer) (1873 or 1876–1928), English cricketer
- Henry Mark Anthony (1817–1886), English landscape artist
- Henry T. Anthony (1814–1884), American photographer

== See also ==
- Anthony Henry (disambiguation)
