= Samassi Abou =

French-Ivorian footballer (born 1973)

Personal information
- Date of birth: 4 April 1973 (age 53)
- Place of birth: Gagnoa, Ivory Coast
- Height: 1.82 m (6 ft 0 in)
- Position: Forward

Senior career*
Years	Team	Apps	(Gls)
1991–1992	FC Martigues	24	(7)
1992–1996	Olympique Lyonnais	58	(4)
1996–1997	AS Cannes	37	(5)
1997–2000	West Ham United	22	(5)
1998	→ Ipswich Town (loan)	5	(1)
1999	→ Walsall (loan)	8	(0)
1999	→ Troyes (loan)	?	(?)
2000	→ Kilmarnock (loan)	10	(0)
2000–2002	AC Ajaccio	60	(4)
2002–2003	FC Lorient	16	(0)
Total		240	(26)

International career
1993–1994	France U21	5	(1)
- * Club domestic league appearances and goals

Samassi Abou (born 4 April 1973) is a former professional footballer who played as a forward. Born in Ivory Coast, he played internationally for the French under-21 team.

== Life and career ==
Abou started playing in France for FC Martigues, before moving to Lyon. In October 1997, after a spell at AS Cannes, he made the move to English football, signing for West Ham United for £250,000. Signed by manager Harry Redknapp to give more options for strikers, Abou made his West Ham debut on 9 November 1997, in a 2–1 away defeat to Chelsea coming on as a substitute for John Moncur. His opening West Ham goal came on 6 January 1998, in the League Cup. In a fifth-round game at the Boleyn Ground, Abou came on as a substitute for Paul Kitson to score their only goal in a 2–1 defeat. In the following game, on 10 January 1998, Abou scored twice as West Ham beat Barnsley 6–0. Abou received his only red card in the next game, a 1–0 away defeat to Tottenham Hotspur. Fouling Ramon Vega in an off-the-ball incident, Abou was dismissed by referee David Elleray. Abou finished the 1997–98 season with 6 goals from 26 games, including two on the last day of the season in a 4–3 home defeat of Leicester City. West Ham fans would boo Abou whenever he scored, upset by this he asked "why do they boo me?" His teammate replied "they say Abooooooooo" from that moment Samassi always had a big smile on his face when he heard 'Aboooooooooo'. In 31 appearances in all competitions, he scored six times, before being released to Ipswich Town in December 1998, where he scored once against Sheffield United.

In October 1999, he signed for Walsall, an unsuccessful spell which lasted little over a month. He also spent time on loan at Troyes, and played in Scotland for three months at Kilmarnock. Abou then continued his career back in France, playing for Ajaccio and Lorient.

After retiring from playing, he returned to Ivory Coast and now runs a youth football academy in Abidjan.

== Honours ==
West Ham United

- UEFA Intertoto Cup: 1999
