= Frank Lampard =

English football player and manager (born 1978)

Frank Lampard OBE
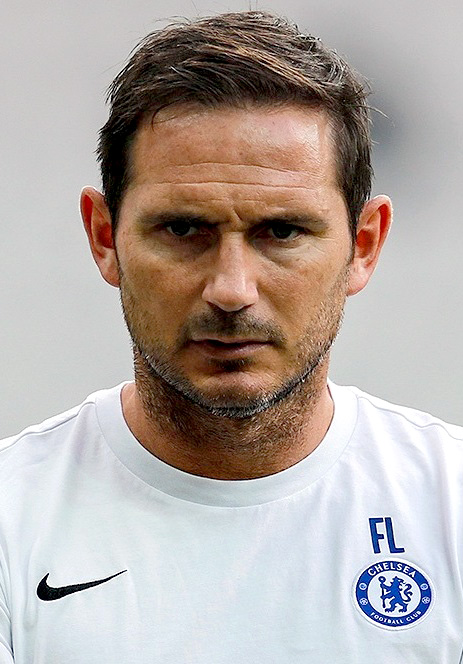
- Lampard as Chelsea manager in 2019

Personal information
- Full name: Frank James Lampard
- Date of birth: 20 June 1978 (age 48)
- Place of birth: Romford, London, England
- Height: 6 ft 0 in (1.84 m)
- Position: Midfielder

Team information
- Current team: Coventry City (manager)

Youth career
- 1994–1995: West Ham United

Senior career*
Years	Team	Apps	(Gls)
1995–2001	West Ham United	148	(24)
1995–1996	→ Swansea City (loan)	9	(1)
2001–2014	Chelsea	429	(147)
2014–2015	Manchester City	32	(6)
2015–2016	New York City FC	29	(15)
Total		647	(193)

International career
1997–2000	England U21	19	(9)
1998	England B	1	(0)
1999–2014	England	106	(29)

Managerial career
- 2018–2019: Derby County
- 2019–2021: Chelsea
- 2022–2023: Everton
- 2023: Chelsea (caretaker)
- 2024–: Coventry City
- * Club domestic league appearances and goals

Frank James Lampard (born 20 June 1978) is an English football manager and former midfielder who is the head coach of Premier League club Coventry City. Widely regarded as one of the greatest midfielders of all time and one of Chelsea's and the Premier League's greatest ever players, Lampard holds the record of the most Premier League goals (177) by a midfielder in its history. He is also one of the few footballers to have made over 1,000 competitive appearances.

A box-to-box midfielder, Lampard began his career in 1995 at West Ham United, the club where his father Frank Sr. also played. In 2001, he was signed by London rivals Chelsea for £11 million. In his thirteen years with the club, Lampard established himself as a prolific scorer from midfield, becoming the club's all-time leading goalscorer, with 211 goals in all competitions.

At Chelsea, Lampard won three Premier League titles, the UEFA Champions League, the UEFA Europa League, four FA Cups, and two League Cups. In 2005, he was named FWA Footballer of the Year, and finished runner-up for both the Ballon d'Or and FIFA World Player of the Year. After leaving Chelsea, Lampard played for fellow Premier League side Manchester City, and Major League Soccer club New York City FC before retiring in 2017. He ranked highly on a number of statistics for Premier League players for ten years from 1 December 2000, including most games and most wins.

Lampard played 106 matches and scored 29 goals for the England national team, after making his debut in 1999. He represented his country at three FIFA World Cups – in 2006, 2010, and 2014 – and in UEFA Euro 2004, where he was named in the Team of the Tournament. Lampard was voted England Player of the Year in 2004 and 2005.

Lampard is one of 11 players, and the only midfielder, to have scored 150 or more goals in the Premier League. He is fourth in the Premier League's all-time assists ranking, with 102 assists. Lampard holds a number of additional Chelsea and Premier League records, and has won PFA Fans' Player of the Year and the FWA Tribute Award. During his career, he was named in the PFA Team of the Year three times, Premier League Player of the Month four times, Premier League Player of the Season once, and finished as the Premier League's top assist provider three times, and was named in the FIFPro World XI and a MLS All-Star. After departing, Lampard was named in the Chelsea Team of the Decade as voted for by Chelsea fans, and into the Premier League Hall of Fame.

After retiring from international football, Lampard was appointed an Officer of the Order of the British Empire (OBE) in 2015 for services to football. Lampard served as a team captain on the ITV sport panel show Play to the Whistle from 2015 until 2017. He has also written a number of children's books.

Lampard began his managerial career with Derby County in 2018, leading the club to the final of that season's Championship play-offs. He returned to Chelsea as head coach a year later, guiding them to fourth place and the FA Cup Final in his first season, before being dismissed in 2021. Following a one-year spell with Everton, and a brief return to Chelsea as caretaker, Lampard joined Coventry City as manager in 2024 and won the 2025–26 Championship.

== Club career ==
=== West Ham United ===
Lampard began his career at West Ham United, his father's former club, joining the youth team in 1994, his schoolboy hero being West Ham striker Frank McAvennie. Lampard joined West Ham when his father was the assistant coach, entering as an apprentice in the youth team in 1994 and signing a professional contract the following year. He went on loan to Second Division club Swansea City in October 1995, debuting in his team's victory 2–0 over Bradford City and scoring his first career goal in a match against Brighton & Hove Albion. Lampard played nine times for Swansea before returning to West Ham in January 1996.

==== 1995–97: Development ====
Lampard made his debut for West Ham on 31 January 1996 against Coventry City coming on as a substitute for John Moncur. His only other game of the season was the season's last, on 5 May 1996, a 1–1 home draw with Sheffield Wednesday when Lampard was used as a substitute for Keith Rowland.

The following season Lampard made his first start for West Ham, on 17 August 1996, in a 2–0 away defeat to Arsenal before being substituted for Robbie Slater. Lampard's season ended on 15 March 1997 when he sustained a broken leg during an away, 0–0 draw, against Aston Villa. Carried from the pitch on a stretcher, his 31st-minute substitute was Rio Ferdinand. The game also saw his first booking as a West Ham player. Lampard claims to have been jeered from the pitch by West Ham United supporters, an action which made him consider leaving football. He had made 16 appearances in all competitions for The Hammers.

==== 1997–99: First-team regular ====
From this season Lampard took the number 18 squad number having previously held the number 26 spot. On the first day of the 1997–98 season, West Ham opened their fixtures with an away game against Barnsley who were playing in the top tier of English football for the first time in 110 years. Lampard came on as a 76th-minute substitute for Eyal Berkovic. He scored what was the winning goal in a 2–1 win for The Hammers having received the ball from Michael Hughes and flicking it past Barnsley goalkeeper David Watson. The season also saw his first hat-trick. On 19 November 1997, West Ham played Walsall in a League Cup, fourth-round game. Lampard's three goals plus another from John Hartson were enough to beat Walsall who responded via a goal from Andy Watson. Lampard made 42 appearances for the 1997–98 season in all competitions scoring nine goals.

Lampard was an ever-present for West Ham in the 1998–99 season, helping his team to fifth place in the 1998–99 Premier League and qualification for the UEFA Intertoto Cup. This is the highest West Ham have ever come in the league.

==== 1999–2001: New contract and departure ====
Before the start of the 1999–2000 FA Premier League season, Lampard signed an extension to his contract which would have kept him with the club until 2005. Having qualified for the Intertoto Cup, West Ham's season started early, in July 1999. On 24 July 1999, Lampard scored his first goal in European football in a 1–1 away draw with Finnish side Jokerit. Another goal in the semi-final against Heerenveen put West Ham into the final against Metz. Despite losing the first leg 1–0 in London, West Ham won 3–1 in France on 24 August 1999 with goals from Trevor Sinclair, Paulo Wanchope and Lampard. Winning the competition saw West Ham in the 1999–2000 UEFA Cup. Lampard scored his first goal in this competition on 16 September 1999, in a 3–0 home win against Osijek, a tie which they won 6–1 on aggregate.

This season also saw West Ham beat Bradford City 5–4 at Upton Park in February 2000. The game received notoriety for Lampard's fight over the ball with Paolo Di Canio. With West Ham 4–2 down they gained a penalty. Lampard was West Ham's regular penalty taker. Di Canio, however, wanted to take the kick and the two tussled over the ball with Di Canio winning and scoring to make the game 4–3 to West Ham. In the 1999–2000, season he finished as the club's third top scorer, behind Di Canio and Paulo Wanchope, with a total of 14 goals.

In the 2000–01 season, West Ham spent most of the season in the bottom half of the Premier League table. From fifth place the previous season they finished 15th. Despite this Lampard scored 9 goals in 37 games, behind only Frédéric Kanouté and Di Canio. In May 2001, his uncle Harry Redknapp left the club by mutual consent after seven years in the role. His father Frank also left the club and Lampard, under the pressure of being known as "Frank Lampard's son" and the poor treatment of his father by West Ham, decided to move to another club. He left West Ham for Chelsea for £11 million in June 2001, the Hammers having previously declined a £15 million joint bid from Aston Villa for Lampard and Frédéric Kanouté.

=== Chelsea ===
==== 2001–04: Signing and first-team breakthrough ====
Lampard's Premier League debut with Chelsea came on 19 August 2001 in a 1–1 draw with Newcastle United on the opening day of the 2001–02 season, while his first red card came in a match against Tottenham Hotspur on 16 September 2001. He appeared in all of Chelsea's league matches and scored eight goals in the 2001–02 season. He netted the match-winner in Chelsea's 2002–03 season-opener against Charlton Athletic.

The following season, he was selected as the Premier League Player of the Month in September 2003, and the PFA Fans' Player of the Month in October. Chelsea finished second in the 2003–04 Premier League behind unbeaten Arsenal and he was named in the 2004 PFA Team of the Year as he reached double figures in league goals (10) for the first time in his career, in addition to four goals in fourteen UEFA Champions League matches, as Chelsea advanced to the semi-finals. In the semi-final against Monaco he scored, but Chelsea lost 5–3 on aggregate. At the end of the season, he came second behind Thierry Henry for the 2004 FWA Footballer of the Year award.

==== 2004–06: Back-to-back Premier League wins ====
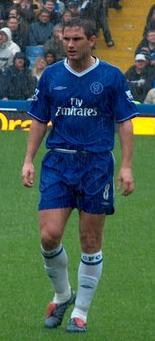
Lampard playing for Chelsea in 2004

Lampard played in all 38 Premier League matches for the third consecutive season in 2004–05. He finished with 13 goals (19 in all competitions), in addition to leading the league in assists with 18.

In August 2004, he scored the winning goal against Southampton in the Premier League, and continued scoring important goals as he scored both in a 2–0 win against Tottenham. In March 2005 he scored a long-range goal from 30 yards against Crystal Palace in the Premier League which Chelsea won 4–1. Lampard continued his season strongly, and his brilliant performances for Chelsea in the Premier League and Champions League further increased his reputation as one of the best midfielders in the world. In the 2004–05 Champions League, he scored one of the goals in Chelsea's famous 4–2 win over Barcelona, helping Chelsea to progress to the quarter-finals. In the quarter-finals, he scored three goals in two legs against Bayern Munich as Chelsea won 6–5 on aggregate. His second goal in the first leg was a spectacular one; he controlled Claude Makélélé's cross with his chest then turned and swivelled and sent the ball inside the far post with a left-foot half volley.

In April 2005, Lampard scored both goals against Bolton Wanderers in a 2–0 win which was the Premier League title-winning match for Chelsea, which also won the first major trophy of his career as Chelsea bagged their first top-flight title in 50 years, by a 12-point margin. He was named as Barclays Player of the Season for 2004–05. Though Chelsea were eliminated in the Champions League semi-finals by league rivals Liverpool, they took home the Football League Cup, in which Lampard scored twice in six matches, which included the opening goal against Manchester United in the League Cup semi-final, which Chelsea won 2–1. He landed his first personal award by being named the 2005 Footballer of the Year.

"He is one of my best players ever, one of my best professionals ever, a Chelsea legend and a legend in the Premier League."

— José Mourinho on Lampard, 2015.

Lampard netted a career-high 16 league goals in 2005–06. In September 2005 he was selected as a member of the inaugural World XI. He finished as runner-up to Ronaldinho for both the Ballon d'Or and FIFA World Player of the Year awards. His record of consecutive Premier League appearances ended at 164 (five better than previous record-holder David James) on 28 December 2005, when he sat out a match against Manchester City due to illness. Lampard scored 12 goals in his first four months of the 2005–06 season. He scored twice in three separate matches from August to November, including both in a 2–1 win over Aston Villa, making Chelsea the first team to win their first seven matches in the Premier League. He scored twice again, this time against Blackburn Rovers in a 4–2 win, which included a free-kick from 25 yards. After the match, manager José Mourinho hailed Lampard as the "best player in the world". Chelsea eventually won the Premier League for the second time, in which Lampard was Chelsea's topscorer with 16 league goals. In the Champions League group stage, he scored a free-kick against Anderlecht. Chelsea progressed to the first knock-out round to face Barcelona, with Lampard scoring a goal in the second leg, but Chelsea were eliminated 3–2 on aggregate.

==== 2006–11: Domestic and individual success ====
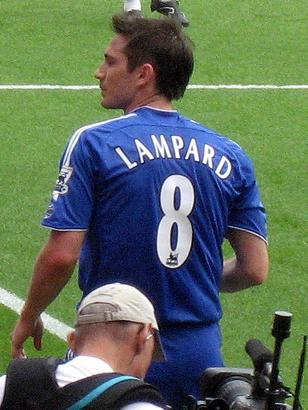
Lampard playing for Chelsea in 2007

Due to a back injury sustained by John Terry, Lampard spent much of the 2006–07 campaign as team captain in his absence. He enjoyed a streak of seven goals in eight games. He scored both goals in a 2–0 win over Fulham and scored his 77th goal for Chelsea from a long range strike in a 3–2 win over Everton on 17 December, overtaking Dennis Wise as Chelsea's highest scoring midfielder. Then in the UEFA Champions League group stage he scored a goal from an extremely tight angle against Barcelona, at the Camp Nou, the match ended 2–2. Lampard finished with 21 goals in all competitions, including a career-high six FA Cup goals. He scored his first Chelsea hat-trick in the third-round tie against Macclesfield Town on 6 January 2007. He scored two goals to help Chelsea to a quarter-final draw with Tottenham Hotspur after having trailed 3–1, and he was named the FA Cup player-of-the-round for his performance. He gave the assist to Didier Drogba in the 2007 FA Cup Final which was the winning goal in extra-time, as Chelsea won it 1–0. In a post-match interview following Chelsea's FA Cup Final victory over Manchester United, Lampard said he wanted to stay at the club "forever".

Lampard's 2007–08 season was hampered by injury. He managed to play 40 matches, 24 of them in the Premier League. This was the fewest league games he had played in a season since 1996–97. On 16 February 2008, Lampard became the eighth Chelsea player to score 100 goals for the club in a 3–1 FA Cup fifth-round win over Huddersfield Town. After the final whistle, Lampard removed his jersey and flashed a T-shirt to the Chelsea fans with "100 Not Out, They Are All For You, Thanks" printed across the front. On 12 March 2008, Lampard scored four goals in a 6–1 rout of Derby County. Then in the second leg of the Champions League quarter-final, he scored the winning goal against Fenerbahçe in the 87th minute as Chelsea won 3–2 on aggregate.

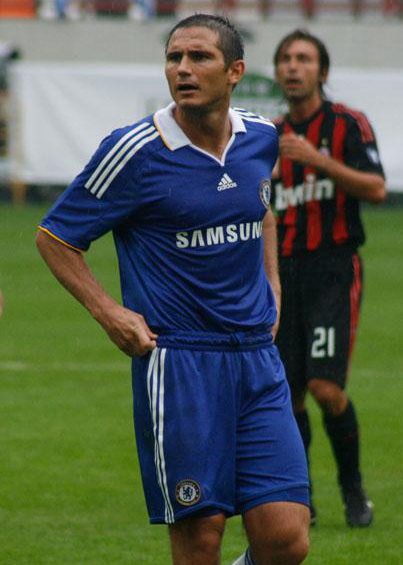
Lampard playing for Chelsea in 2008

On 30 April, Lampard, grieving the loss of his mother a week earlier, decided to play in the second leg of Chelsea's Champions League semi-final against Liverpool, who were eliminated on 4–3 aggregate as he took an emotional penalty in the 98th minute of extra-time, which he scored confidently. In the final against Manchester United, he scored an equalising goal in the 45th minute, as Michael Essien's deflected shot found him as he went to the box with his trade-mark late run, and he scored with a left foot finish. The match ended 1–1 after extra-time and Chelsea eventually lost 6–5 on penalties. He was later named UEFA Club Midfielder of the Year.

On 13 August 2008, Lampard signed a new five-year contract with Chelsea worth £39.2 million, making him the highest-paid Premier League player. He started the 2008–09 season by scoring five goals in his first eleven league matches. He scored the 150th goal of his club career with a goal against Manchester City in the Premier League. In October 2008, in the Premier League he scored a chipped goal against Hull City with his left foot; he unleashed a chip from 20 yards that curled and swerved and fooled the goalkeeper as it went into the net. FIFA World Cup-winning coach Luiz Felipe Scolari said after the game, "It was the best goal I have seen, my vote for World Player of the year award will go to him, only a player with his intelligence could have done that." Lampard scored his hundredth career Premier League goal in a 5–0 victory over Sunderland on 2 November. Eighteen of Lampard's hundred goals were penalties. He was named Premier League Player of the Month for the third time in his career in October.

After a streak of matches without scoring, Lampard scored three goals in two games, the first being against West Bromwich Albion and the latter two against Fulham. On 17 January 2009, he made his 400th Chelsea appearance against Stoke City, scoring a stoppage time winner. He again scored a stoppage time winner on 28 February, this time against Wigan Athletic. Then in the fourth round of the FA Cup, he scored a free-kick from 35 yards against Ipswich Town. He scored twice against Liverpool in the second-leg quarter finals of the Champions League which ended 4–4, but Chelsea won 7–5 on aggregate. Then he provided two assists in the next game against Arsenal in FA Cup semi-finals which Chelsea won 2–1. Lampard finished the season with 20 goals and 19 assists. Lampard's 20th goal of the season was the winning goal in the FA Cup Final against Everton, with a left-foot shot from long-range. He repeated the corner flag celebration his father had done after scoring the winning goal in the 1979–80 FA Cup semi-final second leg against Everton. It was the fourth consecutive season that he scored 20 or more goals. He was later named Chelsea's Player of the Year for the third time.

Lampard started the 2009–10 season by scoring against Manchester United, in the 2009 Community Shield, in the 72nd minute. The match ended 2–2, and Lampard scored in its penalty shootout which they won 4–1. He scored his 133rd goal for Chelsea in a Champions League match against Atlético Madrid on 21 October 2009, which moved him up to fifth among the club's all-time goalscorers. He had been struggling to score the number of goals he had in the past seasons, however this soon changed as he scored two goals in the 5–0 defeat of Blackburn on 24 October 2009. On 30 October, he was nominated for the FIFA World Player of the Year award for the sixth-straight year.

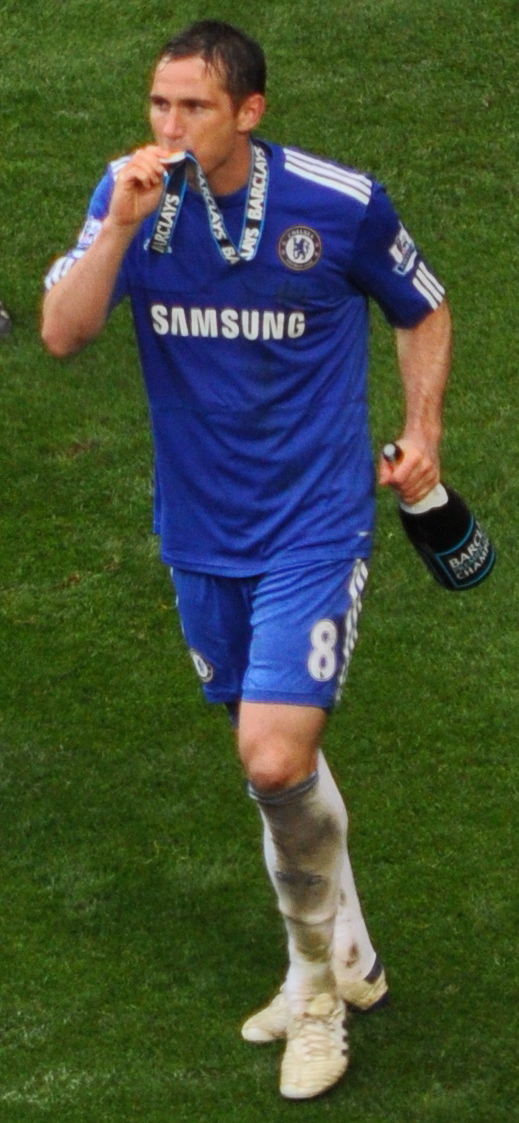
Lampard celebrating after winning the 2009–10 Premier League title with Chelsea

On 16 December, Lampard scored a crucial 79th minute winning goal against Portsmouth and on 20 December, Lampard scored a penalty against his former club West Ham in a 1–1 draw, however he had to take his spot-kick three times due to players running into the box too early, he nonetheless scored all three. In Chelsea's 7–2 thrashing of Sunderland in January 2010, Lampard scored twice to add to his league tally. On 27 January 2010, Lampard again scored two goals, in Chelsea's 3–0 win over Birmingham City in the Premier League. On 27 February, Lampard yet again scored twice against Manchester City but despite his contribution Chelsea went on to lose the game 4–2 at home, for the first time in 38 games.

Lampard, for the second time in his career, hit four goals in one match against Aston Villa on 27 March 2010 to bring his goal tally past 20, for the fifth-consecutive season. This also brought him his 151st Chelsea goal, and it put him as the club's third highest scorer ever, overtaking Peter Osgood's record of 150. Lampard scored in a 3–0 win, again over Aston Villa, in the 2010 FA Cup semi-final. Lampard reached 20 Premier League goals for the first time when he scored twice against Stoke City in Chelsea's 7–0 win on 25 April 2010. This milestone also represented the first time he had hit 25 in all competitions in a season. On 2 May, Lampard scored against Liverpool in the second last game of the season to give Chelsea a vital three points that took them to the top of the league by a single point. He scored one and assisted two other goals in the final match of the season where Chelsea thrashed Wigan Athletic 8–0 at Stamford Bridge to win the 2009–10 Premier League title and give him a remarkable 27 goals in the season. Lampard ended his season lifting the 2010 FA Cup as Chelsea beat Portsmouth 1–0 in the final.

The 2010–11 season began brightly for Lampard, being an integral part of Chelsea's system as usual. After a match against Stoke in August 2010, which Chelsea won 2–0, it was revealed that Lampard was suffering from a hernia, which was successfully operated on. However, he suffered fresh injuries during training in mid-November, and remained sidelined for a further three weeks. Manager Carlo Ancelotti said that he injured his abductor muscle in his leg in training on 11 November, and would not be fit until December. He finally made his comeback after four months out injured against Tottenham on 12 December, as a substitute in the 75th minute. Lampard scored a penalty in the 3–3 draw between Chelsea and Aston Villa on 2 January 2011, the first after returning from injury. On 9 January, Lampard scored twice and gave one assist in a 7–0 win against Ipswich Town in the FA Cup reaching the landmark of 201 career club goals.

On 1 February, Lampard scored a penalty against Sunderland, then produced an assist, with Chelsea ending up winning the game 4–2. Lampard then assisted for Nicolas Anelka in Chelsea's 2–0 victory against Copenhagen, in the Round of 16 match in the Champions League. On 1 March, Lampard scored the winning goal in a crucial 2–1 victory over Manchester United, keeping Chelsea's Premier League title hopes alive. Then in the next game, he scored two goals in Chelsea's 3–1 victory over Blackpool, and also contributed with an assist for John Terry to score.

In April 2011, Lampard scored his 11th goal of the season in a 3–0 victory against former club West Ham. Lampard scored again against Manchester United, but it proved to be only a consolation, as Chelsea lost 2–1 at Old Trafford, thus ending Chelsea's title hopes.

==== 2011–13: European triumphs ====
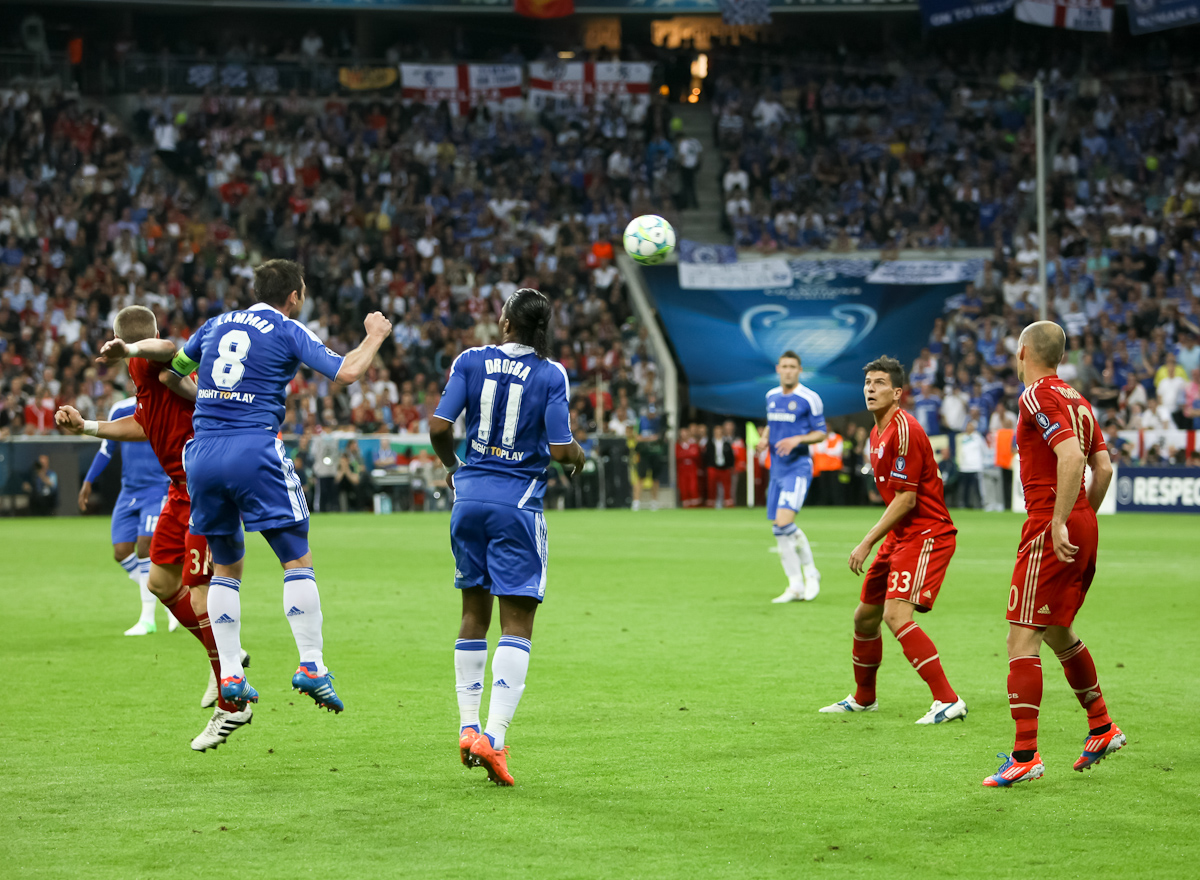
Lampard and Didier Drogba in the 2012 UEFA Champions League Final against Bayern Munich

In Chelsea's third Premier League match of the season, Lampard scored his first goal of the season and also provided an assist for José Bosingwa's opening goal, as Chelsea beat Norwich City 3–1.

After not featuring in Chelsea's 4–1 win against Swansea City on 24 September, Lampard returned to the starting line-up for their Champions League group stage game against Valencia netting an important opening goal in their 1–1 draw. Lampard continued his fine form by netting his fifth Chelsea hat-trick on 2 October, in a 5–1 thrashing of Bolton Wanderers.

In the eleventh round of the Premier League, Lampard scored the only goal of the match against Blackburn Rovers with a diving header, giving Chelsea a win after two consecutive defeats. After starting the game against Manchester City on the bench, Lampard came on in the second half to score the winning goal from the penalty spot in the 82nd minute. Lampard again proved to be the match-winner as he scored in the 89th minute against Wolverhampton Wanderers, with the match finishing 2–1 to Chelsea.

On 25 February 2012, Lampard scored his tenth Premier League goal of the season in Chelsea's 3–0 win against Bolton, becoming the only player to score at least ten goals in nine consecutive seasons in the Premier League and his 149th all-time league goal.

Eleven days after the dismissal of manager André Villas-Boas, Chelsea hosted Napoli in the 2011–12 Champions League round of 16-second leg, trailing the Naples side 3–1 from the first leg. Lampard helped Chelsea make a remarkable comeback, assisting John Terry from a corner for the second goal and then equalising the aggregate score from the penalty spot with a powerful shot to the left of the goal. Branislav Ivanović sealed Chelsea's victory in extra-time. In the second leg of the quarter-finals of the 2011–12 UEFA Champions League against Benfica, Lampard converted a crucial penalty to give Chelsea a 2–1 win at Stamford Bridge, and helping them advance with an aggregate score of 3–1. He scored the 150th Premier League goal of his career against Fulham in a 1–1 draw on 9 April 2012. In the semi-final of the FA Cup Chelsea defeated Tottenham Hotspur 5–1, in a match that would be remembered for an infamous "goal that never was" awarded to Chelsea's Juan Mata. Lampard assisted Didier Drogba for the first goal, and also scored the fourth goal for the Blues from a free-kick 35 yards from goal.

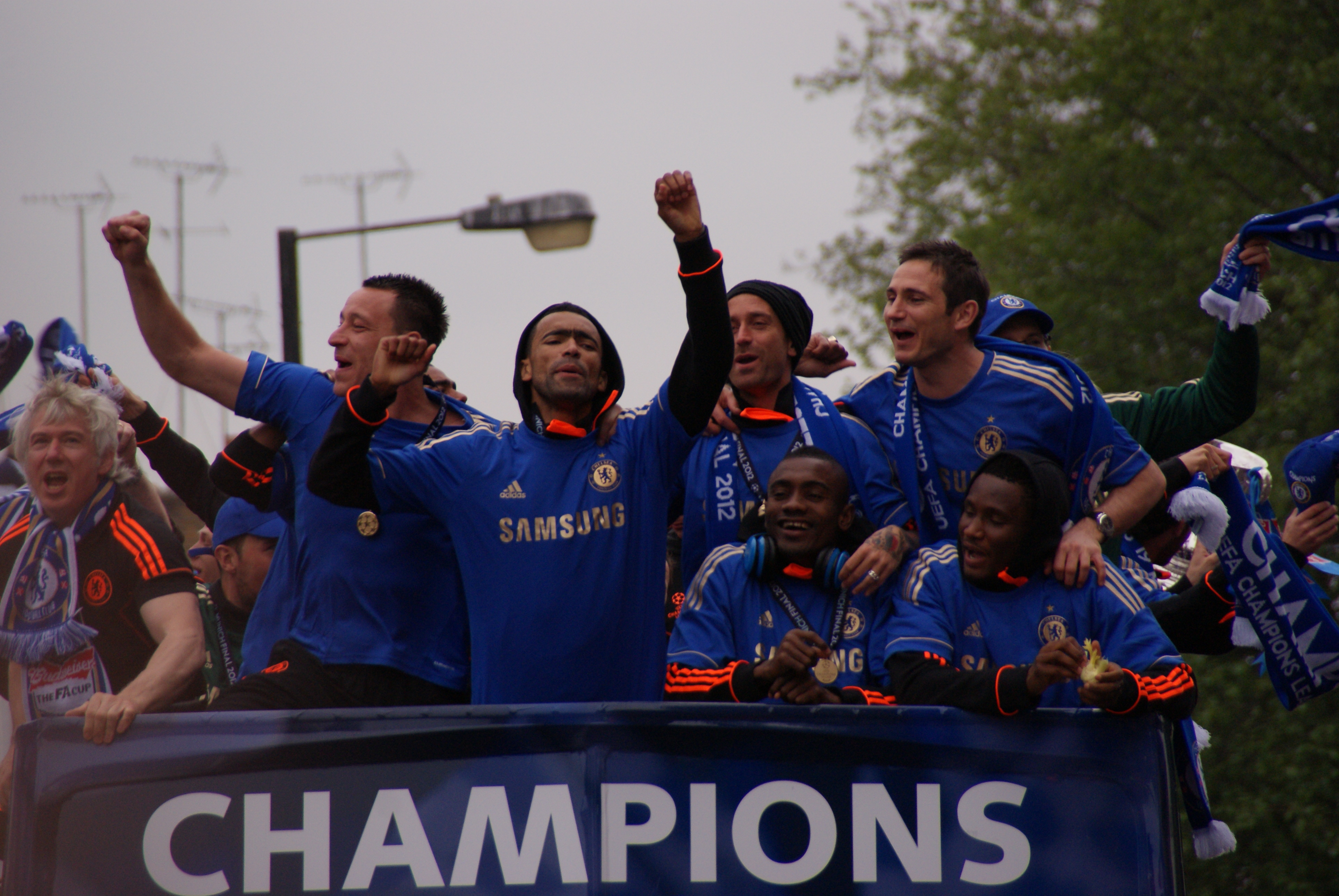
Chelsea players celebrate winning the UEFA Champions League

Lampard was pivotal in the semi-finals of the 2011–12 Champions League against the heavily favoured defending champions Barcelona. Bookmakers had Barcelona on the shortest odds to win a second consecutive Champions League title, and various commentators opined that Chelsea would have to produce their best two games of the season – and hope that Barca played their worst two – to upset the Catalan giants. In the first leg at Stamford Bridge, Lampard stripped Lionel Messi off the ball then played a cross-field pass to Ramires, who set up Drogba for the only goal of the game, giving Chelsea a 1–0 advantage. In the second leg at the Camp Nou, Lampard assumed the captaincy after Terry was sent off early in the game. Down 2–0 to Barça just before half-time, Lampard assisted Ramires' goal with a through-pass which levelled the aggregate score at 2–2 while putting Chelsea ahead on away goals. Chelsea teammate Fernando Torres added another goal in stoppage time to give Chelsea a 3–2 victory overall and produce one of the greatest upsets in the history of European football. This set up Chelsea's match with Bayern Munich at the Allianz Arena in the Champions League final.

In the 2012 FA Cup Final, Lampard assisted Didier Drogba's winning goal in 2–1 win over Liverpool, the seventh FA Cup in Chelsea's history as well as the fourth of his career. Lampard captained Chelsea in the 2012 Champions League final against Bayern Munich due to Terry's suspension. It was a match where Chelsea were considered to be the underdogs. After finishing 1–1 in normal time, the game went to a penalty shootout with Lampard successfully converting his team's third spot-kick, helping Chelsea win 4–3 on penalties. As Chelsea's captain for the match, Lampard lifted the trophy with club captain Terry. Lampard ended the 2011–12 season as Chelsea's top scorer with 16 goals in all competitions, along with 10 assists.

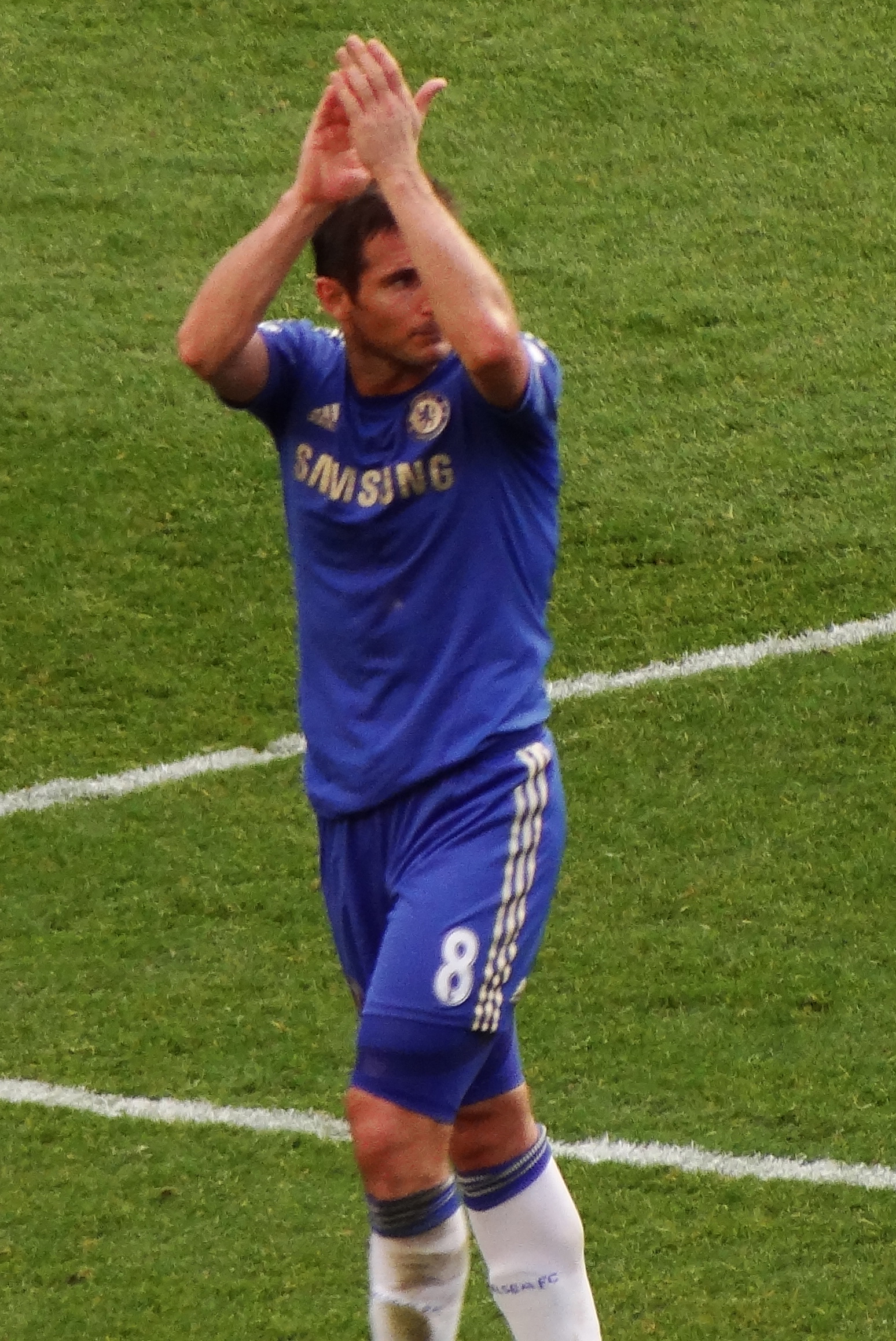
Lampard playing for Chelsea in 2012

Lampard missed Euro 2012 with a thigh injury, but did play all of Chelsea's pre-season games, scoring against the MLS All-Stars and Brighton & Hove Albion. In Chelsea's first game of the new Premier League campaign, Lampard converted a penalty won by Eden Hazard as Chelsea brushed aside Wigan 2–0. In Chelsea's second game of the season, three days later against newly promoted Reading, he again converted a penalty won by Hazard as Chelsea cruised to a 4–2 win. On 6 October, he scored his third league goal of the season in a 4–1 win against Norwich City. After six weeks out injured, on 16 December Lampard appeared in the final of the 2012 FIFA Club World Cup with Chelsea losing 1–0 to Brazilian club Corinthians. He marked his 500th appearance in the Premier League by scoring in an 8–0 win against Aston Villa on 23 December. On 30 December 2012, Lampard scored a brace as Chelsea came from a goal down in the game against Everton to win 2–1.

"You talk about the Zolas and the best players to have played at the club, but for me he [Lampard] is the best. You can only single out two players to play consistently well and to score goals over the course of the last 10–15 years and that is him and Ryan Giggs. It's incredible, to see the number of goals he's scored at such a high level as well – Champions League goals, Premier League goals – and the hunger. He is an example to all the players here."

— John Terry on Lampard scoring his 200th goal for Chelsea in March 2013.

In the third round of the FA Cup, Lampard entered in the second half and scored a penalty in Chelsea's victory over Southampton. On 6 January 2013, Lampard's agent Steve Kutner announced that Lampard would not be offered a new contract with Chelsea and would leave when his contract expired in June 2013. On 12 January 2013, Lampard scored a penalty in the 4–0 win over Stoke City at the Britannia Stadium. This goal made Lampard Chelsea's second-highest goalscorer of all-time with 194 goals and moved him clear of Kerry Dixon and putting him eight goals behind Bobby Tambling in first. He scored his 199th goal for Chelsea in a 4–0 FA Cup victory over Brentford on 17 February, becoming Chelsea's all-time leading FA Cup goalscorer with 26 goals. Lampard's 200th Chelsea goal came against his former club West Ham on 17 March 2013, heading home an Eden Hazard cross.

Lampard equalled Bobby Tambling's record with a long-range goal into the top left corner from just outside the box in the 61st minute in a league match against Aston Villa on 11 May. Then, later on in the 88th minute, he scored a second goal, breaking the record and securing a 2–1 victory for Chelsea. In the UEFA Europa League final on 15 May, Lampard captained the London club to a 2–1 victory over Benfica, securing the 11th major trophy of the Roman Abramovich era.

On 16 May 2013, Lampard signed a one-year extension to his contract with Chelsea, stating "I always maintained the dream was to stay at Chelsea."

==== 2013–14: Final season at Chelsea ====
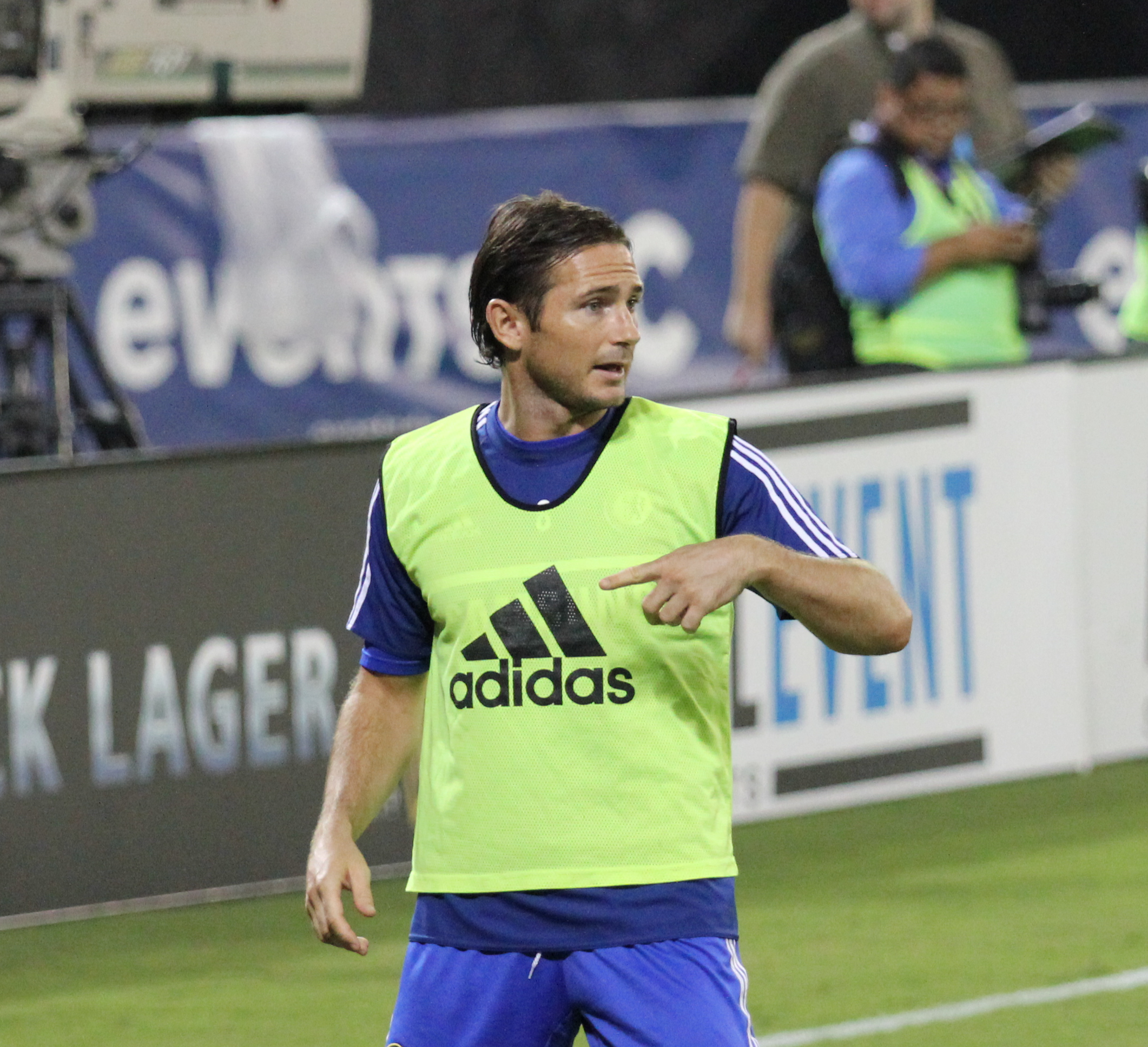
Lampard on pre-season tour with Chelsea in 2013

On the opening day of the 2013–14 Premier League season, Lampard scored a free-kick in a 2–0 win against newly promoted Hull City. On 1 October, he scored his 205th goal for Chelsea in a 4–0 win away to Steaua București in the Champions League. On 23 November 2013, Lampard scored his 206th and 207th goals for Chelsea against his former club West Ham in a 3–0 win. Lampard moved to fourth on the all-time Premier League goal-scoring list on 2 December by beating Robbie Fowler's number of 164 goals. On 22 February 2014, Lampard scored a stoppage-time winner against Everton, initially credited to John Terry but awarded to Lampard by the Dubious Goals Committee, keeping Chelsea in first place.

In March, in recognition of his contributions, Lampard was given share number 200 by the Chelsea Pitch Owners Association which owns the Stamford Bridge freehold. On 2 April, he played his 100th Champions League match, losing 3–1 to Paris Saint-Germain. On 5 April 2014, Lampard scored the 250th goal of his club career in a 3–0 win against Stoke.

On 23 May 2014, Lampard was included on the list of players released by Chelsea. Lampard, however, said that any contract talks with Chelsea would be decided after the 2014 World Cup, with a statement saying "he will meet with Chelsea before any consideration of a move elsewhere". On 3 June 2014, Chelsea confirmed Lampard would leave the club.

=== Manchester City ===
==== Signing and New York City FC controversy ====
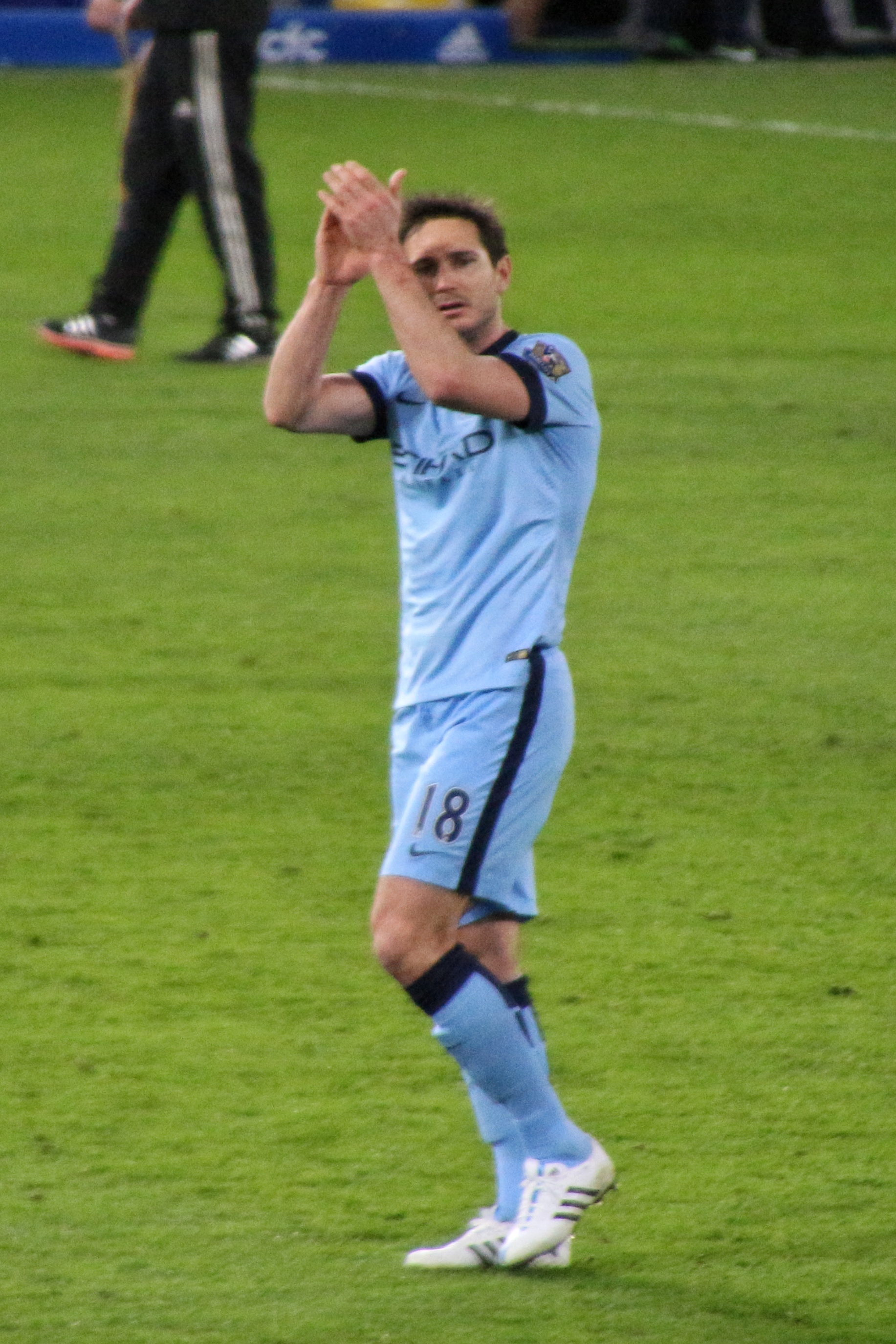
Lampard with Manchester City in 2015

On 24 July 2014, it was claimed that Lampard, as a free agent, had signed a two-year contract with New York City FC (NYCFC) to commence ahead of the 2015 MLS season. It was announced at a live press conference in Brooklyn that he would be joining the club, which would be entering Major League Soccer (MLS) for the 2015 season. Sporting director Claudio Reyna hailed him as "one of the greatest players in world history". NYCFC's parent club, Manchester City, announced on 3 August 2014 that Lampard would join the club on a six-month deal ending in January 2015. Initially reported as a loan, reports emerged on 31 December 2014 that Lampard had signed a short-term contract with the club as a free agent with his MLS contract not to start until the end of his stay in Manchester. The same day, it was announced Lampard would extend his contract with Manchester City until the end of the English season, missing the start of the 2015 MLS season and it was confirmed that Lampard had never been an MLS player with his arrival date in MLS unclear.

Lampard extending his stay in Manchester prompted an angry response from fans in New York, with NYCFC being accused of dishonesty for using the player in their promotional material and MLS Commissioner Don Garber being accused of poor leadership and a lack of transparency in handling the affair. On 1 January 2015, Manchester City head coach Manuel Pellegrini hinted that Lampard could extend his stay at Manchester City to a second season. On 9 January, Manchester City admitted that Lampard had never signed a two-year contract with NYCFC, having instead originally signed a non-binding "commitment" to join the team. The same day, Lampard confirmed his intention to join NYCFC at the end of the 2014–15 Premier League season. Around 300 people asked for season ticket refunds in response to the affair, while the 2015 MLS SuperDraft started a chant of "Where's Frank Lampard?" from the crowd.

==== 2014–15: Only season in Manchester ====
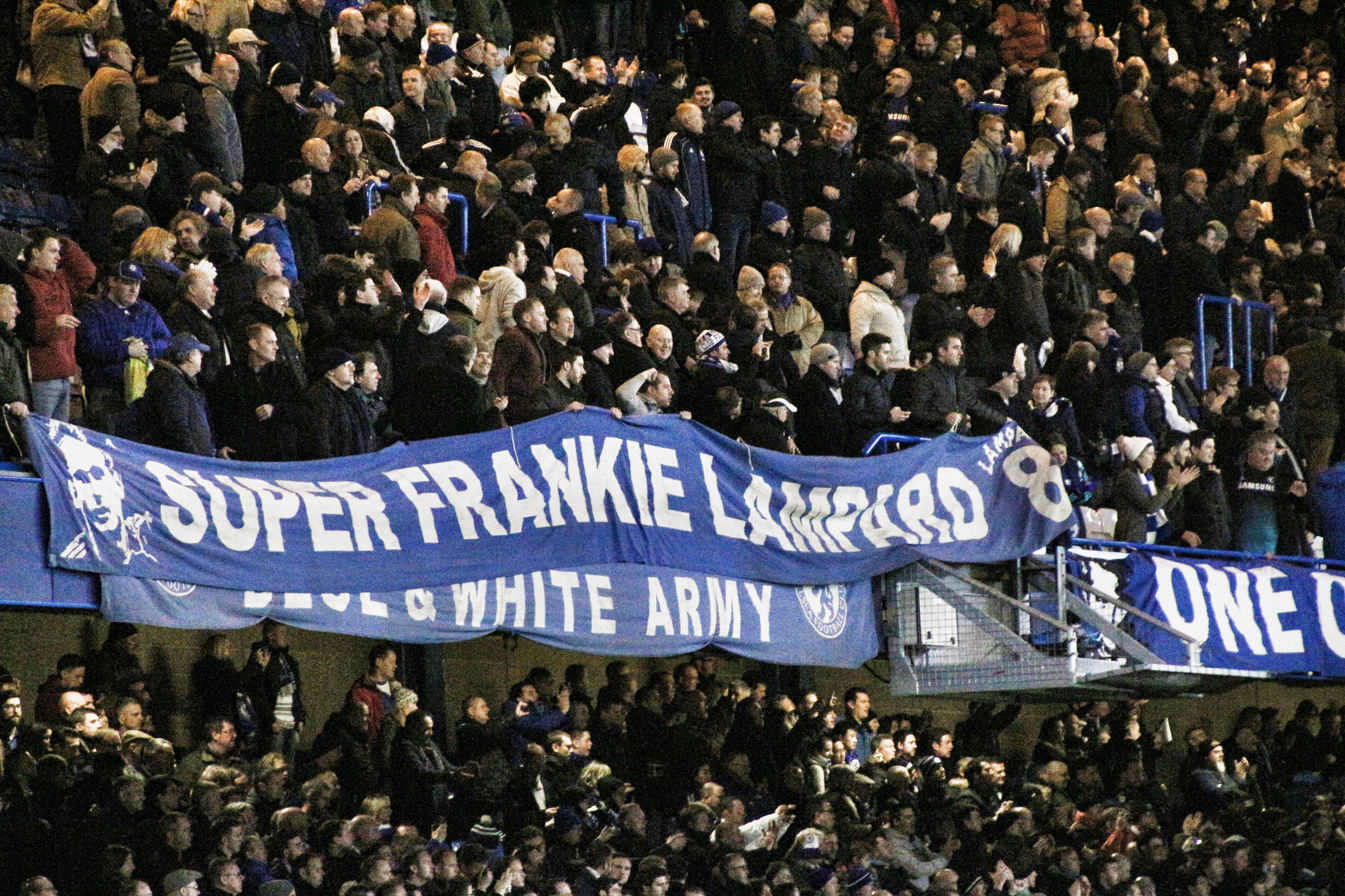
Chelsea fans wave a "Super Frankie Lampard" banner during his appearance for Manchester City against Chelsea at Stamford Bridge in 2015

Lampard made his Manchester City debut on 13 September in a 2–2 away draw against Arsenal; he received a yellow card and was substituted at half-time for Samir Nasri. He scored his first goal for the club on 21 September with a volley from inside the box against former club Chelsea, having only been on the field for seven minutes as a substitute. Lampard's equalising goal ended Chelsea's perfect winning streak in the season, but it was a goal which he did not celebrate, and he described it as a very emotional day. In Lampard's first League Cup match for City three days later, he scored the first and last goals as the side defeated Sheffield Wednesday 7–0 at home in the third round. On 27 September, Lampard came on in the 71st minute, only to score another goal to make it four goals in four matches and his fourth that week. He made his first Champions League appearance on 30 September in Manchester City's 1–1 draw with Roma.

"For me, what makes Frank Lampard special is how professional he is in training. You see him at training: He is the first to arrive on the training ground and the last to go home. He won everything with Chelsea, he's a legend in football and he's still playing like he's 18 years old."

— Pablo Zabaleta on Lampard, 2014.

On 1 January 2015, the day after extending his stay with the club, Lampard scored the winner for City in a Premier League encounter against Sunderland. On 14 March 2015, Lampard made his 600th Premier League appearance, becoming the second player to do so after Ryan Giggs, coming on as a substitute during City's 1–0 defeat to Burnley. On 24 May, Lampard captained Manchester City in their final match of the season and the last of his spell with the club. He scored his 177th Premier League goal to give City the lead in an eventual 2–0 win over Southampton at the City of Manchester Stadium and was substituted for Jesús Navas in the 77th minute.

=== New York City FC ===
==== 2015–16: Final seasons and retirement ====
On 10 January 2015, Lampard signed a pre-contract to play for New York City FC in MLS, beginning on 1 July. Injury delayed his debut until 1 August, when he came on as a 69th-minute substitute for Andrew Jacobson in a 3–2 defeat to the Montreal Impact at Yankee Stadium. In July, Lampard was one of the 22 players to be named to the 2015 MLS All-Star Game roster. On 16 September, he scored his first MLS goal as his team beat Toronto 2–0 to end a three-game losing streak. Eleven days later, Lampard scored the opening goal in a 2–1 victory over Vancouver Whitecaps FC in the 29th minute of play; he was later also fouled in the area in the final minute of stoppage time, which allowed David Villa to convert the match-winning goal from the resulting penalty. On 2 October, he scored New York City's fastest ever goal in MLS history in a 2–1 away defeat to D.C. United. The team finished its debut season outside a place for the MLS Cup Playoffs, which drew criticism from some in the media, who expected more from the club's trio of designated players composed of former Champions League winners Lampard, David Villa, and Andrea Pirlo.

Having missed the beginning of the season with a calf injury, Lampard made his first appearance in 2016 on 22 May in the New York derby, playing the final 15 minutes; New York City lost the game 7–0, while Lampard was jeered by his side's own fans. However, he then scored in his first start of the season against Philadelphia Union on 18 June and was cheered by the New York fans once again. In his second start, he managed to make it back-to-back goals against Seattle Sounders FC on 20 June. His fourth goal in five matches came against Sporting Kansas City in a 3–1 defeat on 11 July. Lampard then took his goal tally for the season to five with the third goal in a 3–1 victory over the Montreal Impact on 17 July.

On 31 July 2016, Lampard became the first New York City player to score a hat-trick, achieving this feat in a 5–1 win over the Colorado Rapids. Lampard finished his second MLS season with the club with 13 goals and 3 assists in 19 appearances, as New York City finished in second place in the Eastern Conference, and qualified for the MLS Cup Playoffs for the first time ever, clinching a spot in the Eastern Conference semi-finals. He featured in both legs of the Conference semi-final against Toronto, as New York were eliminated from the Playoffs 7–0 on aggregate. On 14 November 2016, New York City announced that Lampard would leave as soon as his contract expired.

Lampard announced his retirement on 2 February 2017 after turning down several offers, and said that he would look to obtain his coaching qualifications after retiring.

== International career ==
=== Youth and early career ===
Lampard was capped by England at youth level before making his under-21 debut on 13 November 1997 in a match against Greece. He played for the under-21 side from November 1997 to June 2000, and scored nine goals in 19 appearances, a mark bettered only by Alan Shearer and Francis Jeffers. He was capped once by England B, playing in a 2–1 home defeat against Chile on 10 February 1998.

On 10 October 1999, Lampard debuted for the England senior squad in a 2–1 friendly win over Belgium. He scored his first goal on 20 August 2003 in a 3–1 win over Croatia. He was part of the team at the FA Summer Tournament (Manchester) 2004, which England won.

He was overlooked for Euro 2000 and the 2002 World Cup, and had to wait until Euro 2004 to take part in his first international competition. England reached the quarter-finals with Lampard scoring three goals in four matches. He scored against France and Croatia in the group stages. In the quarter-final, he equalised for England in the 112th minute against Portugal, bringing the scoreline to 2–2 but England lost on penalties. He was named in the team of the tournament by UEFA.

=== 2004–10: UEFA Euro 2004 and 2006 FIFA World Cup ===
He became a regular in the squad following the retirement of Paul Scholes, and was voted England Player of the Year by fans in 2004 and 2005. He was England's top-scorer in their 2006 World Cup qualifying campaign, with five goals. He scored two crucial goals in the qualifiers, the first against Austria in a 1–0 win, and the second being the winning goal against Poland.

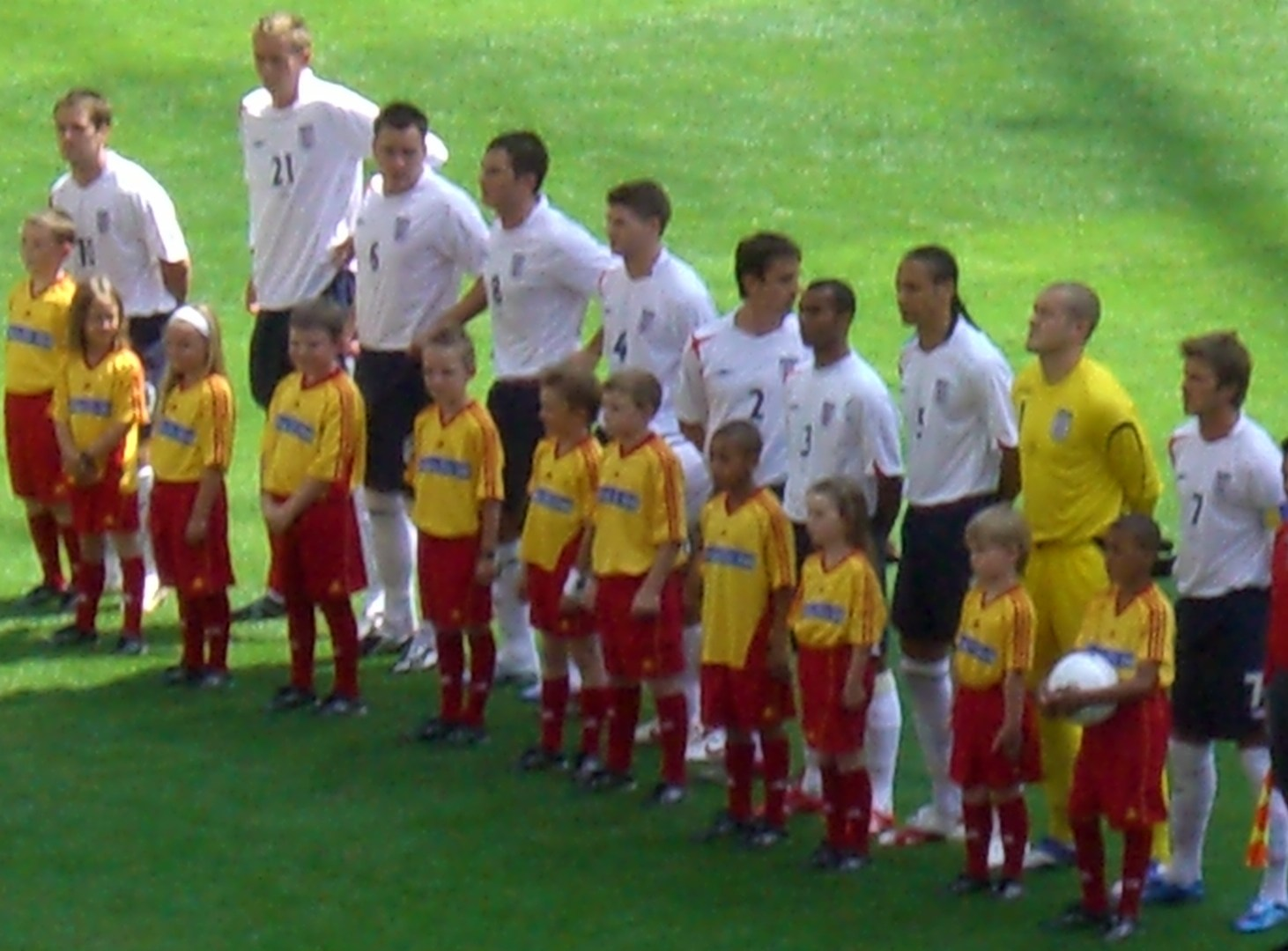
Lampard (wearing No.8) lining up for England against Paraguay at the 2006 FIFA World Cup

In England's first game of the tournament against Paraguay, Lampard was named man of the match as England won 1–0. Though Lampard played every minute of England's 2006 World Cup matches, he went scoreless as England were eliminated in the quarterfinals by Portugal on penalties, and he was one of the three England players whose penalty was saved alongside Steven Gerrard and Jamie Carragher.

He scored in a 2–1 loss to Germany in a friendly at the new Wembley in 2007. He was very disappointing during qualifying for Euro 2008. He was booed by England supporters while coming on as a second-half substitute during England's Euro 2008 qualifying match against Estonia on 13 October 2007. Lampard sent Stipe Pletikosa the wrong way from the spot and finished with one goal (in a 3–2 loss to Croatia on 21 November) as England failed to qualify for the tournament. He scored his first international goal in two years in a 4–0 win over Slovakia in March 2009, and also created another for Wayne Rooney. Lampard's goal was the 500th England goal scored at Wembley. On 9 September 2009, Lampard struck twice in England's 5–1 win against Croatia which secured their place at 2010 World Cup.

=== 2010–12: 2010 FIFA World Cup and UEFA Euro 2012 injury ===
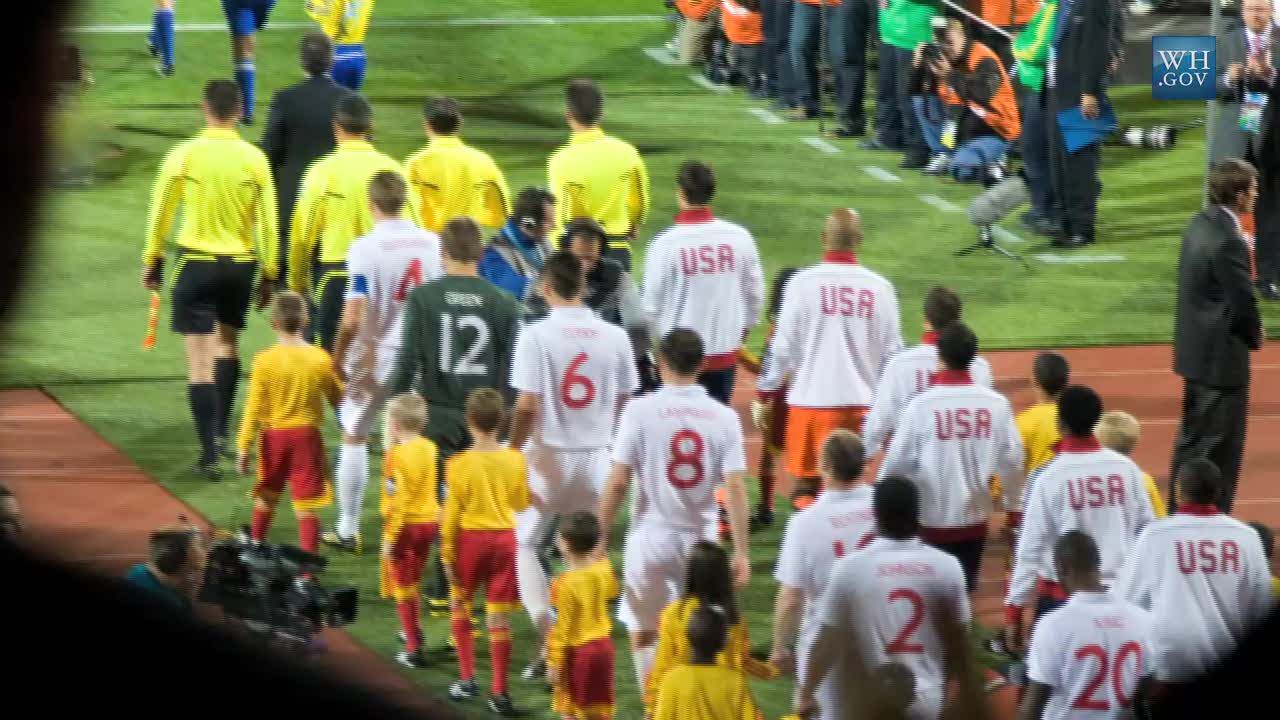
Lampard (wearing No.8) enters the field with his England comrades before the 2010 FIFA World Cup match against the United States.

In the round-of-16 match of the 2010 FIFA World Cup against rivals Germany, Lampard had a first-half shot at goal that bounced off the crossbar and from TV replays was clearly seen to cross the goal line. If counted, it would have tied the game 2–2. However, neither the referee nor the linesman saw it as a goal, and play was continued. In the second-half, Lampard hit the cross-bar again, with a 30-yard free-kick. The final score was a 4–1 win for Germany, eliminating England from the tournament.

As England exited the 2010 FIFA World Cup, Lampard had already achieved the record of having made 37 shots on goal without scoring in a World Cup tournament, more than any other player since 1966.

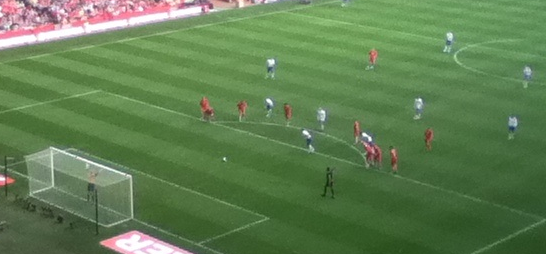
Lampard taking a penalty in a Euro 2012 qualifier against Wales in 2011

On 8 February 2011, it was announced that Lampard would captain the national team against Denmark in a friendly played the next day after both Rio Ferdinand and Steven Gerrard were absent through injury. In the Euro 2012 qualifiers, Lampard netted two goals for England, both penalties. The first against Wales in a 2–0 win, and the latter vs Switzerland in a 2–2 draw. In November 2011, Lampard captained England to a 1–0 friendly victory over current World Champions Spain, a game in which he scored the only goal. On 31 May 2012, he was ruled out of the Euro 2012 due to a thigh injury. He was subsequently replaced by Jordan Henderson.

=== 2012–14: Final years with England ===
On 14 August 2012, manager Roy Hodgson announced that Lampard would captain the Three Lions in their upcoming friendly against Italy the following day, which England won 2–1. Lampard started England's first game in qualification and starred as England thrashed Moldova 5–0, with Lampard scoring his 24th and 25th England goals. His first goal was England's 100th ever penalty and his second was a header from a cross from Glen Johnson, after Steven Gerrard was substituted he captained the side. On 22 March 2013, he surpassed David Platt as England's highest scoring midfielder when he scored his 28th international goal in a 0–8 win over San Marino. Lampard became only the eighth English player to earn his 100th England cap, doing so in a World Cup qualifier against Ukraine, on 10 September 2013.

On 12 May 2014, Lampard was named in the 23-man England squad for the 2014 FIFA World Cup and a week later he was named vice-captain. On 24 June, for the last game of the group stage, Lampard captained his England side to draw with Costa Rica 0–0. On 26 August 2014, Lampard announced that he had retired from international football. He earned 106 caps, scoring 29 goals.

== Style of play ==
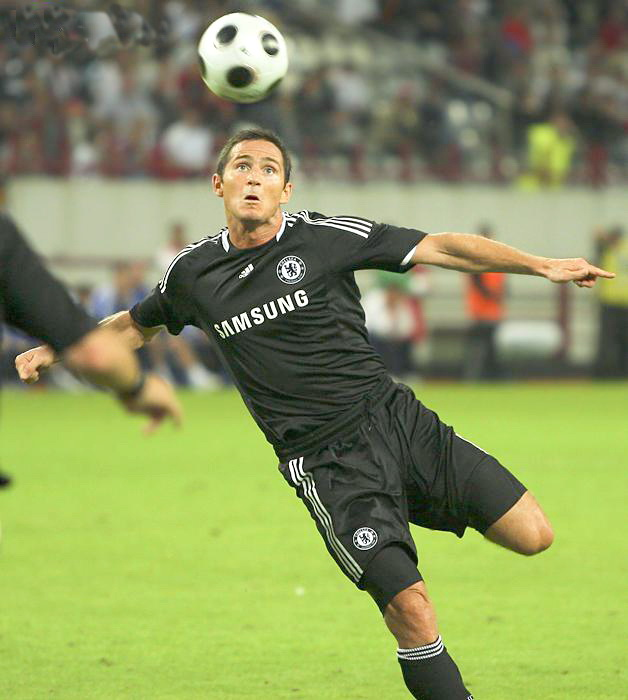
Lampard attempting to strike a volley

Regarded by some pundits, managers, and teammates as one of the greatest players of his generation, Lampard was an all-round and versatile box-to-box player, who was capable of playing anywhere in midfield; throughout his career he was deployed as a central midfielder, as an attacking midfielder, as a defensive midfielder, and even as a supporting striker on occasion. He was also deployed as a deep-lying playmaker on occasion, in particular in his later career, due to his ability to build attacks with his passing.

A hard-working player, with notable stamina and an ability to read the game, Lampard was also capable of functioning creatively and starting attacking plays or providing assists for teammates after winning back possession, due to his technique, vision, and passing range. In addition to his creative and defensive midfield duties, Lampard also possessed a keen eye for goal, due to his ability to get forward and make late attacking runs from behind into the penalty area, or produce accurate and powerful shots from distance. These attributes enabled him to maintain a prolific goalscoring record throughout his career, despite his deep playing position. Moreover, Lampard was also an accurate set-piece and penalty kick taker, who was known for scoring with powerful, low driving shots from free kicks.

Beyond his qualities as a footballer, he also stood out for his leadership throughout his career. In 2017, Gareth Southgate labelled Lampard as one of the group of England's past players who were "very good", but below the likes of the nation's past "top players", such as Gascoigne, Scholes, and Rooney, commenting: "You've got very good players and then there are top players. In my time in the England setup, Paul Gascoigne, Paul Scholes and Rooney just had that little bit more than all the others. And we are talking high‑level people there, players like Steven Gerrard, Frank Lampard and David Beckham."

== Managerial career ==
=== Derby County ===
On 31 May 2018, Lampard was appointed as manager of Championship club Derby County on a three-year contract. His first game in charge, on 3 August, resulted in a 2–1 away win for Derby at Reading, with Tom Lawrence scoring a last-minute winner. His first loss as a manager came on 11 August in a 4–1 loss against Leeds United, in his second match in charge. On 25 September, in just his 12th game as a manager, Lampard's Derby County knocked Premier League club Manchester United out of the EFL Cup on penalties, following a 2–2 draw at Old Trafford.

After a 2–0 defeat in the return fixture against Leeds United at Elland Road on 11 January 2019 to further Leeds' lead at the top of the Championship table, Lampard was critical of Leeds head coach Marcelo Bielsa, as in the pre-match build-up Bielsa admitted he had sent a spy to the Derby training ground, after reports emerged in the press that a man was spotted the previous day outside the Derby training ground. On 12 January, Leeds United released a statement in response to the incident. Tottenham Hotspur manager Mauricio Pochettino described the incident as 'not a big deal' and commonplace in Argentina.

In his first season in charge of Derby, Lampard guided the club to the Championship play-offs after helping them finish 6th in the 2018–19 Championship season. In the semi-finals of the play-offs, Derby overturned a 0–1 home loss to win 4–2 away against Leeds United and claim the tie 4–3 on aggregate, setting up an appearance against Aston Villa in the final. Derby lost the play-off final to Aston Villa 2–1.

On 25 June 2019, Derby granted Lampard permission to hold talks with the Chelsea bosses over said position.

=== Chelsea ===
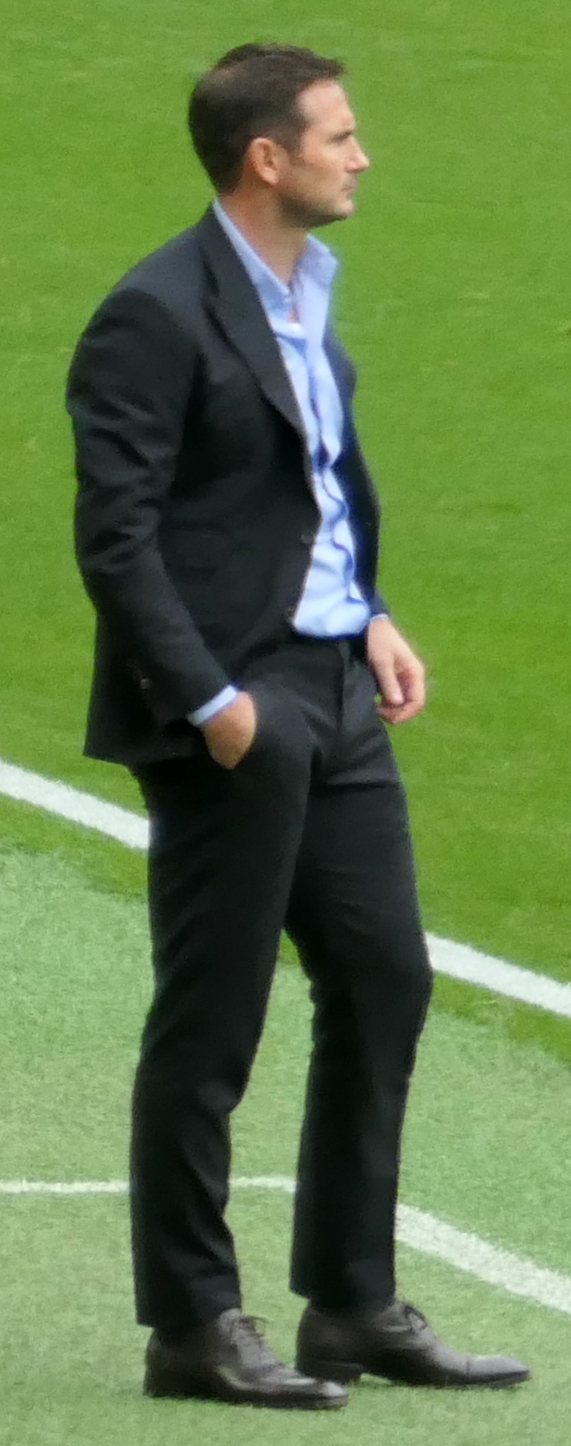
Lampard managing Chelsea in 2019

On 4 July 2019, Lampard was appointed as the new head coach at former club Chelsea on a three-year contract, making him the first English manager to manage the side in over two decades. In Lampard's first competitive game with Chelsea, the club lost 4–0 to Manchester United on the opening day of the 2019–20 Premier League. It was the biggest defeat for a Chelsea manager in their first game since Danny Blanchflower's team was beaten 7–2 by Middlesbrough in December 1978. In Lampard's second competitive game, they lost to Liverpool on penalties in the 2019 UEFA Super Cup.

On 24 August 2019, Lampard obtained his first Premier League victory as Chelsea manager, beating Norwich City 2–3 away from home. On 25 September, Chelsea picked up their first home win under Lampard, beating League Two side Grimsby Town 7–1 in the EFL Cup. Lampard's matchday squad against Grimsby featured ten academy graduates, including Reece James and Billy Gilmour, making their first-team debuts. Lampard won Premier League Manager of the Month for October 2019 after Chelsea recorded a perfect record in the league for the month. By doing so, he became the third manager to win Premier League Player of the Month and Manager of the Month, after Gareth Southgate and Stuart Pearce. Lampard eventually guided Chelsea to fourth in the Premier League and the FA Cup Final, where they lost to Arsenal.

In the following season, Chelsea made five major acquisitions in the summer transfer window in Hakim Ziyech, Timo Werner, Ben Chilwell, Kai Havertz and Édouard Mendy. Chelsea initially started strongly, topping their Champions League group and the Premier League in early December. However, after a run of two wins in eight Premier League matches, Chelsea dropped to ninth and Lampard was dismissed as manager on 25 January 2021. He remained on Chelsea's payroll to see out his contract, "pocketing £75,000" per week in compensation. His dismissal came just 24 hours after Chelsea's 3–1 win over Luton Town in the FA Cup. On 26 January, German coach Thomas Tuchel was announced as his replacement.

It was reported Lampard's departure was also influenced by disagreements with the club's transfer policy; Lampard is said to have requested the acquisitions of Pierre-Emerick Aubameyang, Declan Rice, and James Tarkowski, with these moves being blocked by Chelsea's co-director Marina Granovskaia. Lampard also reportedly fell out with or had limited communication with some players, causing former teammate and club advisor Petr Čech to have to serve as an intermediary.

=== Everton ===
Having been out of work for a year, Lampard was appointed manager of Premier League club Everton on 31 January 2022, after the dismissal of Rafael Benítez due to poor results. At the time of his appointment, the club was positioned in 16th place, four points above the relegation zone. With one game remaining in the 2021–22 season, on 19 May Lampard guided Everton to Premier League safety maintaining their 68-year top flight status. Having been 2–0 down at half-time to Crystal Palace Lampard brought on Dele Alli and played a more attacking formation resulting in a 3–2 win for the Merseyside team. Lampard described the night as "one of the greatest nights of my career".

The following season saw the club once again fall into a relegation battle, with a run of only 1 win in 11 matches leaving the club 19th in the league by January. Everton owner Farhad Moshiri in an interview with Talksport suggested that Lampard's position at the club remained secure despite this run of form. However, Lampard was dismissed a few days later on 23 January 2023, just eight days less than a year into the job, after a 2–0 loss to West Ham. Lampard was replaced by Sean Dyche on 30 January 2023.

=== Return to Chelsea ===
On 6 April 2023, Lampard returned to Chelsea by being appointed as caretaker manager until the end of the 2022–23 season, following the dismissal of Graham Potter. Chelsea's form dropped after Lampard took over and produced a first bottom-half finish since 1996 and a record low tally of points and goals scored in the Premier League era. In terms of winning percentage, Lampard also had the worst record (9%) among every Chelsea manager who had led 3 or more matches, achieving just one win in his 11 matches in charge.

=== Coventry City ===
On 28 November 2024, Lampard was appointed as the new manager of EFL Championship club Coventry City. He took the club to 5th in the Championship, however lost 3–2 on aggregate to Sunderland in the semi-finals of the play-offs.

In the 2025–26 season, Lampard led Coventry City to the top of the league in the early stages, getting named EFL Championship Manager of the Month for October 2025. Continued good form saw him win the award for a second consecutive month after a 100% record over five matches, scoring fourteen goals.

On 20 December 2025, after a 1–1 draw at Southampton, Lampard was instrumental in starting a melee involving players and staff from both teams after making provocative gestures at home supporters. His behaviour was criticised by a Regulatory Commission, whose report said: "It [the Commission] considered the behaviour of FL, both in goading the fans and in interacting with THB (Taylor Harwood-Bellis) to have been unacceptable and the catalyst for what followed …". On 17 April 2026, Coventry City secured promotion to the Premier League after 25 years, finishing top of the Championship following a 1–1 away draw with Blackburn Rovers. On 30 June 2026, Lampard signed a new contract with Coventry, keeping him with the club until 2029.

== Media ==
From 2015 until 2017, Lampard served as a team captain on the ITV comedy panel show Play to the Whistle alongside Bradley Walsh. He was a regular pundit for football on BT Sport. For the 2018 World Cup, Lampard was among the BBC's list of pundits as he insisted that it would not affect his managerial duties.

Lampard features in EA Sports' FIFA video game series; he was on the cover for the International edition of FIFA 10, alongside Wayne Rooney and Theo Walcott. In 2018, Lampard was added as an icon to the Ultimate Team in FIFA 19.

On Sunday 9 June 2024, Lampard led England to a 6–3 victory as manager in the annual Soccer Aid game against the rest of the world. The match raised £15 million for charity.

== Personal life ==
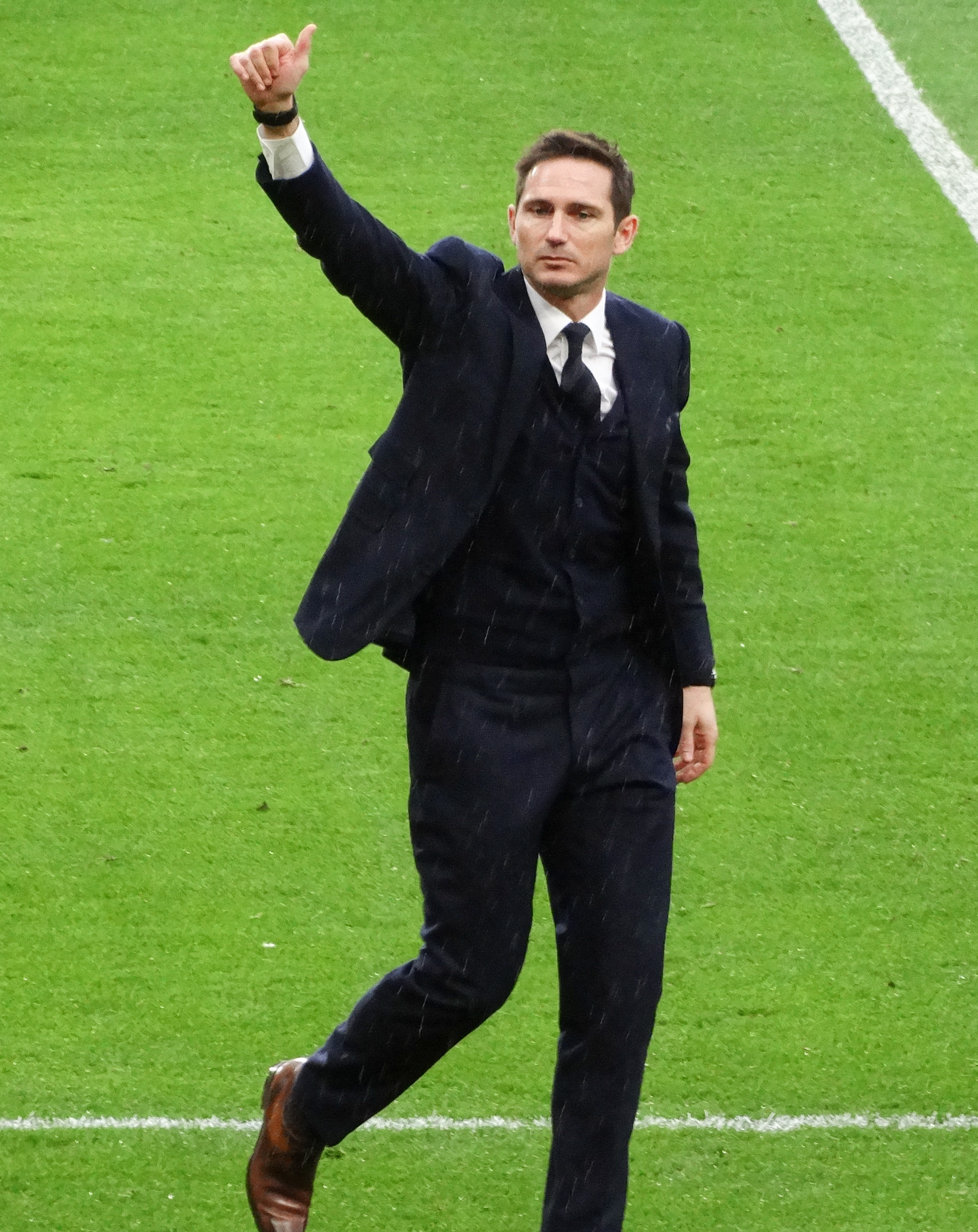
Lampard in 2017

Lampard was born in Romford, London; he has two sisters, Natalie and Claire. He attended Brentwood School between 1989 and 1994, finishing with eleven GCSEs, including an A* in Latin.

Lampard belongs to a family of footballers; his father is Frank Lampard, Sr., the former West Ham United player and assistant manager who was still associated with the club when Lampard junior was playing for them. Lampard's uncle is Harry Redknapp and his cousin is Redknapp's son Jamie Redknapp. His mother Pat (whose twin sister, Sandra, is the wife of Harry Redknapp and mother of Jamie Redknapp), a librarian, died in April 2008 aged 58 as a result of pneumonia.

Lampard is a Christian, and credits his faith for helping him cope with the death of his mother.

Lampard is a supporter of the Conservative Party and was rumoured to be running as a candidate for Kensington upon Malcolm Rifkind's retirement at the 2015 general election. He subsequently denied that he was running to be an MP.

He was appointed an Officer of the Order of the British Empire (OBE) in the 2015 Birthday Honours. Lampard published his autobiography, Totally Frank, in 2006. He has written a series of children's novels, inspired by his mother and children, related to football.

Lampard formerly owned The Pig's Ear, Chelsea's oldest pub, with his father. They sold the business in 2018, and his father then took over the Grade II Nightingale pub in Wanstead in 2019. Lampard has retained the ownership of the freehold at the Old Church Street, Chelsea property.

Lampard has had a troubled relationship with his boyhood club West Ham United where he was seen by some fans as a product of nepotism. He claims that he often received negative taunts about his weight, and that during a match as an 18-year-old when he broke his leg in play, he heard cheers from fans. Following his transfer to Chelsea, Lampard turned against his former club and has since stated: "I remember when Joe Cole first came to Chelsea he would turn away in disappointment if West Ham lost. I would smile. That's how deeply I felt. I wanted West Ham to lose. Now I don't even look for their results." Later in his career, Lampard adopted a more mature attitude towards his former club saying that he had complete respect for the club and thanking Harry Redknapp and Tony Carr for the influence at the start of his career.

=== Controversies ===
In 2000, Lampard, Rio Ferdinand and Kieron Dyer appeared on a sex video that was filmed at the holiday resort of Ayia Napa in Cyprus. Channel 4 aired a brief edited clip as part of their 2004 documentary Sex, Footballers and Videotape, claiming it was used to "remind the viewer that this is based on real life". On 23 September 2001, Lampard, along with three other Chelsea players, was fined two weeks' wages by the club for his behaviour whilst on a drinking binge on 12 September. Lampard and the others had abused American tourists at a Heathrow hotel, just 24 hours after the September 11 attacks. A hotel manager stated: "they were utterly disgusting. They just didn't seem to care about what had happened". Lampard apologised over his behaviour when he signed for NYCFC in 2014, implying that he did not mean offence and that he was naive and young.

In 2021, Lampard was charged with using a mobile phone while driving after being filmed by CyclingMikey holding a takeaway cup in one hand and a mobile phone in the other. Lampard hired Nick Freeman to defend him. The case was later dropped as the Crown Prosecution Service stated it had insufficient evidence.

=== Relationships ===
Lampard lives in Surrey and London. He has two daughters with his former fiancée, Spanish model Elen Rivas.

On 24 April 2009, Lampard was involved in a radio confrontation with James O'Brien on the London radio station LBC 97.3. Newspapers had reported that following Lampard's split from Rivas their children were living with her in a small flat while Lampard had converted their family home into a bachelor pad. Lampard phoned in, objecting to criticism and stating that he had fought "tooth and nail" to keep his family together.

Lampard married Christine Bleakley, a Northern Irish broadcaster, on 20 December 2015. They have a daughter born in 2018 and a son born in 2021.

== Career statistics ==
=== Club ===
Appearances and goals by club, season and competition
Club	Season	League			National cup (Note: Includes FA Cup)		League cup (Note: Includes Football League Cup)		Continental		Other		Total	
Club	Season	Division	Apps	Goals	Apps	Goals	Apps	Goals	Apps	Goals	Apps	Goals	Apps	Goals
West Ham United	1995–96	Premier League	2	0	0	0	0	0	—		—		2	0
West Ham United	1996–97	Premier League	13	0	1	0	2	0	—		—		16	0
West Ham United	1997–98	Premier League	31	5	6	1	5	4	—		—		42	10
West Ham United	1998–99	Premier League	38	5	1	0	2	1	—		—		41	6
West Ham United	1999–2000	Premier League	34	7	1	0	4	3	10 (Note: Six appearances and three goals in UEFA Intertoto Cup, four appearances and one goal in UEFA Cup)	4	—		49	14
West Ham United	2000–01	Premier League	30	7	4	1	3	1	—		—		37	9
West Ham United	Total		148	24	13	2	16	9	10	4	—		187	39
Swansea City (loan)	1995–96	Second Division	9	1	—		—		—		2 (Note: Appearances in Football League Trophy)	0	11	1
Chelsea	2001–02	Premier League	37	5	8	1	4	0	4 (Note: Appearances in UEFA Cup)	1	—		53	7
Chelsea	2002–03	Premier League	38	6	5	1	3	0	2	1	—		48	8
Chelsea	2003–04	Premier League	38	10	4	1	2	0	14 (Note: Appearances in UEFA Champions League)	4	—		58	15
Chelsea	2004–05	Premier League	38	13	2	0	6	2	12	4	—		58	19
Chelsea	2005–06	Premier League	35	16	5	2	1	0	8	2	1 (Note: Appearance in FA Community Shield)	0	50	20
Chelsea	2006–07	Premier League	37	11	7	6	6	3	11	1	1	0	62	21
Chelsea	2007–08	Premier League	24	10	1	2	3	4	11	4	1	0	40	20
Chelsea	2008–09	Premier League	37	12	7	3	2	2	11	3	—		57	20
Chelsea	2009–10	Premier League	36	22	6	3	1	0	7	1	1	1	51	27
Chelsea	2010–11	Premier League	24	10	3	3	0	0	4	0	1	0	32	13
Chelsea	2011–12	Premier League	30	11	5	2	2	0	12	3	—		49	16
Chelsea	2012–13	Premier League	29	15	4	2	3	0	10 (Note: Three appearances in UEFA Champions League, seven appearances in UEFA Europa League)	0	4 (Note: One appearance in FA Community Shield, one appearance in UEFA Super Cup, two appearances in FIFA Club World Cup)	0	50	17
Chelsea	2013–14	Premier League	26	6	1	0	1	1	11	1	1 (Note: Appearance in UEFA Super Cup)	0	40	8
Chelsea	Total		429	147	58	26	34	12	117	25	10	1	648	211
Manchester City	2014–15	Premier League	32	6	2	0	1	2	3	0	—		38	8
New York City FC	2015	Major League Soccer	10	3	—		—		—		—		10	3
New York City FC	2016	Major League Soccer	19	12	0	0	—		—		2 (Note: Appearance in MLS Cup Playoffs)	0	21	12
New York City FC	Total		29	15	0	0	—		—		2	0	31	15
Career total			647	193	73	28	51	23	130	29	14	1	915	274

=== International ===
Appearances and goals by national team and year
National team	Year	Apps	Goals
England	1999	1	0
England	2000	0	0
England	2001	3	0
England	2002	3	0
England	2003	9	1
England	2004	13	6
England	2005	9	3
England	2006	13	2
England	2007	9	2
England	2008	6	0
England	2009	10	6
England	2010	7	0
England	2011	7	3
England	2012	3	3
England	2013	10	3
England	2014	3	0
Total		106	29

Scores and results list England's goal tally first, score column indicates score after each Lampard goal

List of international goals scored by Frank Lampard
No.	Date	Venue	Cap	Opponent	Score	Result	Competition
1	20 August 2003	Portman Road, Ipswich, England	12	Croatia	3–1	3–1	Friendly
2	5 June 2004	City of Manchester Stadium, Manchester, England	19	Iceland	1–0	6–1	2004 FA Summer Tournament
3	13 June 2004	Estádio da Luz, Lisbon, Portugal	20	France	1–0	1–2	UEFA Euro 2004
4	21 June 2004	Estádio da Luz, Lisbon, Portugal	22	Croatia	4–2	4–2	UEFA Euro 2004
5	24 June 2004	Estádio da Luz, Lisbon, Portugal	23	Portugal	2–2	2–2	UEFA Euro 2004
6	4 September 2004	Ernst-Happel-Stadion, Vienna, Austria	25	Austria	1–0	2–2	2006 FIFA World Cup qualification
7	9 October 2004	Old Trafford, Manchester, England	27	Wales	1–0	2–0	2006 FIFA World Cup qualification
8	26 March 2005	Old Trafford, Manchester, England	31	Northern Ireland	4–0	4–0	2006 FIFA World Cup qualification
9	8 October 2005	Old Trafford, Manchester, England	36	Austria	1–0	1–0	2006 FIFA World Cup qualification
10	12 October 2005	Old Trafford, Manchester, England	37	Poland	2–1	2–1	2006 FIFA World Cup qualification
11	3 June 2006	Old Trafford, Manchester, England	40	Jamaica	1–0	6–0	Friendly
12	16 August 2006	Old Trafford, Manchester, England	46	Greece	2–0	4–0	Friendly
13	22 August 2007	Wembley Stadium, London, England	56	Germany	1–0	1–2	Friendly
14	21 November 2007	Wembley Stadium, London, England	60	Croatia	1–2	2–3	UEFA Euro 2008 qualifying
15	28 March 2009	Wembley Stadium, London, England	68	Slovakia	3–0	4–0	Friendly
16	6 June 2009	Almaty Central Stadium, Almaty, Kazakhstan	70	Kazakhstan	4–0	4–0	2010 FIFA World Cup qualification
17	10 June 2009	Wembley Stadium, London, England	71	Andorra	2–0	6–0	2010 FIFA World Cup qualification
18	5 September 2009	Wembley Stadium, London, England	73	Slovenia	1–0	2–1	Friendly
19	9 September 2009	Wembley Stadium, London, England	74	Croatia	1–0	5–1	2010 FIFA World Cup qualification
20	9 September 2009	Wembley Stadium, London, England	74	Croatia	3–0	5–1	2010 FIFA World Cup qualification
21	26 March 2011	Millennium Stadium, Cardiff, Wales	85	Wales	1–0	2–0	UEFA Euro 2012 qualifying
22	4 June 2011	Wembley Stadium, London, England	86	Switzerland	1–2	2–2	UEFA Euro 2012 qualifying
23	12 November 2011	Wembley Stadium, London, England	90	Spain	1–0	1–0	Friendly
24	7 September 2012	Zimbru Stadium, Chișinău, Moldova	92	Moldova	1–0	5–0	2014 FIFA World Cup qualification
25	7 September 2012	Zimbru Stadium, Chișinău, Moldova	92	Moldova	2–0	5–0	2014 FIFA World Cup qualification
26	11 September 2012	Wembley Stadium, London, England	93	Ukraine	1–1	1–1	2014 FIFA World Cup qualification
27	6 February 2013	Wembley Stadium, London, England	94	Brazil	2–1	2–1	Friendly
28	22 March 2013	Stadio Olimpico di San Marino, Serravalle, San Marino	95	San Marino	5–0	8–0	2014 FIFA World Cup qualification
29	29 May 2013	Wembley Stadium, London, England	96	Republic of Ireland	1–1	1–1	Friendly

== Managerial statistics ==
As of match played 21 November 2026

Managerial record by team and tenure
Team	From	To	Record					Ref.
Team	From	To	P	W	D	L	Win %	Ref.
Derby County	31 May 2018	4 July 2019	57	24	17	16	42.1	
Chelsea	4 July 2019	25 January 2021	84	44	17	23	52.4	
Everton	31 January 2022	23 January 2023	44	12	8	24	27.3	
Chelsea (caretaker)	6 April 2023	30 June 2023	11	1	2	8	9.1	
Coventry City	28 November 2024	Present	95	50	17	28	52.6	
Total			291	131	61	99	45.0	

== Honours ==
=== Player ===
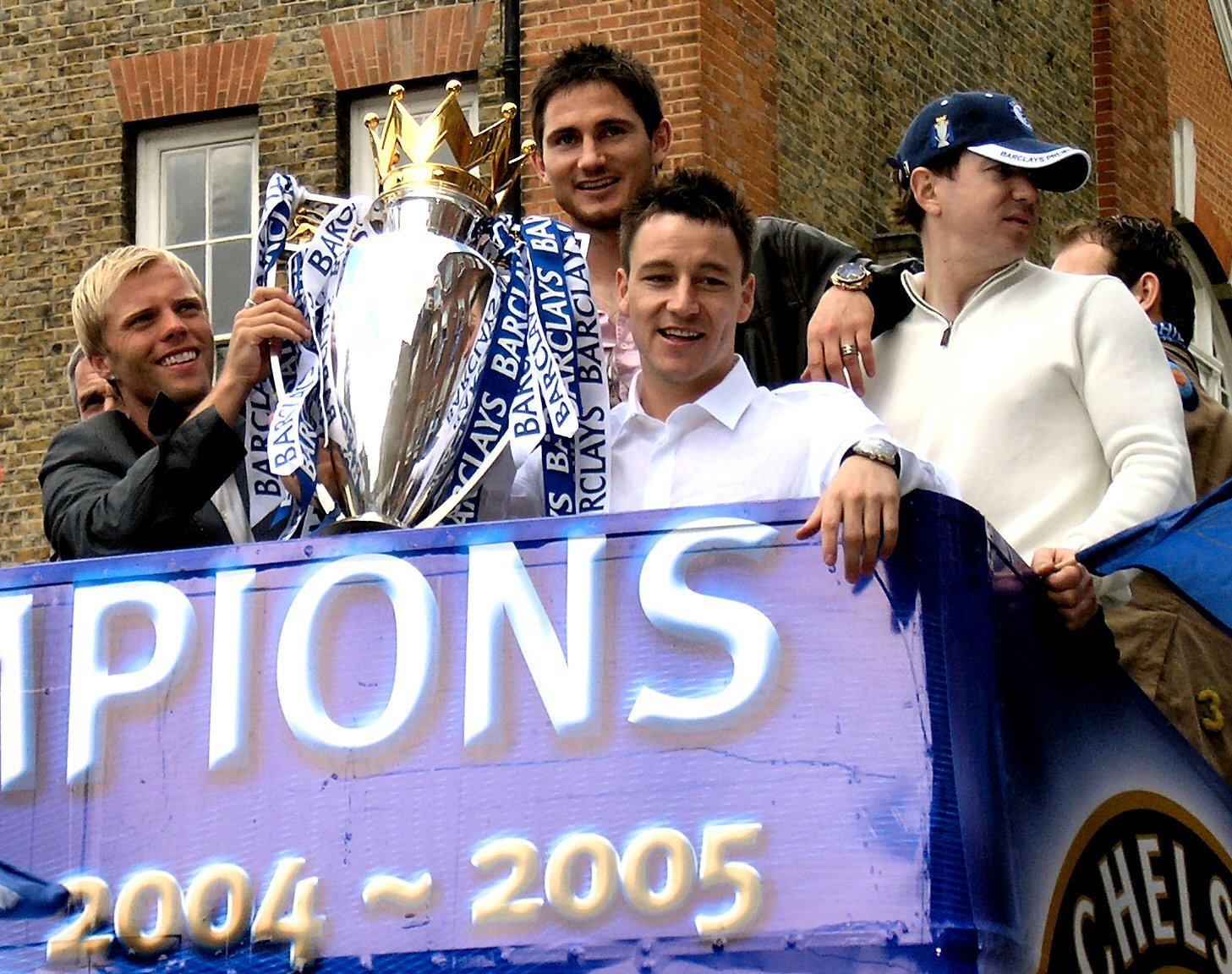
Lampard celebrates winning the 2004–05 Premier League with Eiður Guðjohnsen and John Terry

West Ham United

- UEFA Intertoto Cup: 1999

Chelsea

- Premier League: 2004–05, 2005–06, 2009–10
- FA Cup: 2006–07, 2008–09, 2009–10, 2011–12; runner-up: 2001–02
- Football League Cup: 2004–05, 2006–07; runner-up: 2007–08
- FA Community Shield: 2005, 2009
- UEFA Champions League: 2011–12; runner-up: 2007–08
- UEFA Europa League: 2012–13
- FIFA Club World Cup runner-up: 2012

Individual

- FWA Footballer of the Year: 2005
- PFA Fans' Player of the Year: 2005
- PFA Merit Award: 2015
- FWA Tribute Award: 2010
- Premier League Player of the Season: 2004–05
- Most assists in the Premier League: 2004–05, 2008–09 (shared), 2009–10
- PFA Team of the Year: 2003–04 Premier League, 2004–05 Premier League, 2005–06 Premier League
- FIFPro World XI: 2005
- UEFA Midfielder of the Year: 2008
- England Player of the Year: 2004, 2005
- ESM Team of the Year: 2004–05, 2005–06, 2009–10
- UEFA European Championship Team of the Tournament: 2004
- Premier League Player of the Month: September 2003, April 2005, October 2005, October 2008
- Chelsea Player of the Year: 2004, 2005, 2009
- Premier League 20 Seasons Awards: Premier League 500 Club
- MLS All-Star: 2015
- Globe Soccer Awards Player Career Award: 2015
- MLS Player of the Month: July 2016
- Premier League Hall of Fame: 2021

=== Manager ===
Chelsea

- FA Cup runner-up: 2019–20

Coventry City

- EFL Championship: 2025–26

Individual

- Premier League Manager of the Month: October 2019
- EFL Championship Manager of the Month: October 2025, November 2025
- EFL Championship Manager of the Season: 2025–26
- LMA Manager of the Year: 2025–26
- LMA Awards – EFL Championship Manager of the Year: 2025–26

=== Orders ===
- Officer of the Order of the British Empire: 2015

== Bibliography ==
=== Autobiography ===
- Totally Frank: The Autobiography of Frank Lampard (HarperCollins, 2006) ISBN 9780007214723

=== Children's novels ===
- Frankie vs The Pirate Pillagers (Little Brown, 2013) ISBN 9780349001623
- Frankie vs The Rowdy Romans (Little Brown, 2013) ISBN 9780349001609
- Frankie vs The Cowboy's Crew (Little Brown, 2013) ISBN 9780349001593
- Frankie vs The Mummy's Menace (Little Brown, 2014) ISBN 9780349001630
- Frankie vs The Knight's Nasties (Little Brown, 2014) ISBN 9780349001616
- Frankie and the World Cup Carnival (Little Brown, 2014) ISBN 9780349124438
- Frankie and the Dragon Curse (Little Brown, 2014) ISBN 9780349124469
- Frankie Saves Christmas (Little Brown, 2014) ISBN 9780349124483
- Frankie's New York Adventure (Little Brown, 2015) ISBN 9780349124490
- Frankie's Kangaroo Caper (Little Brown, 2015) ISBN 9780349124513
- The Grizzly Games (Little Brown, 2015) ISBN 9780349132051
- Meteor Madness (Little Brown, 2015) ISBN 9780349132075
- The Great Santa Race (Little Brown, 2015) ISBN 9780349132099
- Team T. Rex (Little Brown, 2016) ISBN 9780349132112
- Deep Sea Dive (Little Brown, 2016) ISBN 9780349132136
- Olympic Flame Chase (Little Brown, 2016) ISBN 9781510201101
- Elf Express (Little Brown, 2016) ISBN 9781510201118
- Mammoth Mayhem (Little Brown, 2016) ISBN 9781510201125
- Summer Holiday Showdown (Little Brown, 2017) ISBN 9781510201132
- Game Over! (Little Brown, 2018) ISBN 9781510201859

== See also ==
- List of footballers with 100 or more UEFA Champions League appearances
- List of men's footballers with 100 or more international caps
- List of men's footballers with the most official appearances
