= Craig Etherington =

English footballer

Personal information
- Date of birth: 16 September 1979 (age 47)
- Place of birth: Basildon, England
- Position: Midfielder

Senior career*
Years	Team	Apps	(Gls)
1997–2000	West Ham United	0	(0)
1999	→ Halifax Town (loan)	4	(0)
2000	→ Plymouth Argyle (loan)	5	(0)
- * Club domestic league appearances and goals

Craig Etherington (born 16 September 1979) is an English former footballer who played in the Football League for West Ham United, Halifax Town and Plymouth Argyle.
