= Tony Henry (footballer, born 1979) =

English footballer

Personal information
- Full name: Anthony Henry
- Date of birth: 13 September 1979 (age 47)
- Place of birth: London, England
- Position: Defender

Youth career
- 1997–1999: West Ham United

Senior career*
Years	Team	Apps	(Gls)
1999–2001	Lincoln City	18	(1)
2000	→ Northwich Victoria (loan)	?	(?)
2001–2003	Folkestone Invicta	?	(?)
2003–2004	Welling United	?	(?)
2004–2005	East Thurrock United	?	(?)
2005	Erith & Belvedere	?	(?)
2005–2006	Dartford	?	(?)
Total		?	(?)
- * Club domestic league appearances and goals

Tony Henry (born 13 September 1979) is an English former professional footballer who played as a defender.

== Career ==
Born in London, Henry began his career in the youth team of West Ham United, where he spent two years as a professional without making a senior appearance. Henry began his senior career at Lincoln City, where he made 18 appearances in the Football League between 1999 and 2001. A broken foot sustained in a reserve team match at Wrexham in April 2000 kept Henry out of the Imps first team picture at the beginning of the 2000–2001 season and on 3 November 2000 he joined Northwich Victoria on loan in order to gain some first team football. He was one of six players released by Alan Buckley at the end of the 2000–2001 season. He later played non-League football for Folkestone Invicta, Welling United, East Thurrock United, Erith & Belvedere and Dartford.
