= 1998–99 Northampton Town F.C. season =

Northampton Town
1998–99 season
- Chairman: Barry Stonhill
- Manager: Ian Atkins
- Stadium: Sixfields Stadium
- Division Two: 22nd
- FA Cup: Second round
- League Cup: Third round
- League Trophy: Second round
- Top goalscorer: League: Carlo Corazzin (16); All: Carlo Corazzin (17)
- Highest home attendance: 7,557 vs Manchester City
- Lowest home attendance: 4,710 vs Wrexham
- Average home league attendance: 6,068

The 1998–99 season was Northampton Town's 102nd season in their history and the second successive season in the Second Division. Alongside competing in Division Two, the club also participated in the FA Cup, League Cup and Football League Trophy.

== Players ==
As of match played 8 May 1999.

Name	Position	Nat.	Place of birth	Date of birth (age)	Apps	Goals	Previous club	Date signed	Fee
Goalkeepers
Steve Francis	GK	(England)	Billericay	29 May 1964 (aged 34)	3	0	Huddersfield Town	25 January 1999	Free
Billy Turley	GK	(England)	Wolverhampton	15 July 1973 (aged 25)	34	0	Evesham United	10 July 1995	Free
Defenders
Ian Clarkson	RB	(England)	Solihull	4 December 1970 (aged 28)	116	2	Stoke City	2 August 1996	Free
Tony Dobson	CB	(England)	Coventry	5 February 1969 (aged 30)	12	0	Gillingham	11 September 1998	£25,000
John Frain	LB	(England)	Birmingham	8 October 1968 (aged 30)	97	2	Birmingham City	Summer 1997	Free
Ian Hendon	RB	(England)	Ilford	5 December 1971 (aged 27)	7	0	Notts County	25 March 1999	£25,000
Colin Hill	CB	(Northern Ireland)	Uxbridge (ENG)	12 November 1963 (aged 35)	71	0	Trelleborgs FF	19 November 1997	£30,000
Richard Hope	CB	(England)	Stockton-on-Tees	22 June 1978 (aged 20)	20	0	Darlington	18 December 1998	Undisclosed
Lee Howey	CB	(England)	Sunderland	1 April 1969 (aged 30)	26	6	Burnley	19 February 1999	£50,000
Garry Hughes	RB	(England)	Birmingham	19 November 1979 (aged 19)	1	0	Apprentice	7 July 1998	N/A
Ian Sampson	CB	(England)	Wakefield	14 November 1968 (aged 30)	241	19	Sunderland	5 August 1994	£30,000
Midfielders
Ali Gibb	RM	(England)	Salisbury	17 February 1976 (aged 23)	141	3	Norwich City	5 February 1996	£30,000
James Hunt	CM	(England)	Derby	17 December 1976 (aged 22)	71	2	Notts County	1 August 1997	Free
Roy Hunter	CM	(England)	Saltburn-by-the-Sea	29 October 1973 (aged 25)	144	13	West Bromwich Albion	2 August 1995	Free
Sean Parrish	LM	(Wales)	Wrexham	14 March 1972 (aged 27)	95	10	Doncaster Rovers	2 August 1996	£35,000
Dean Peer	CM	(England)	Wordsley	8 August 1969 (aged 29)	145	6	Walsall	22 August 1995	Free
Damian Matthew	LM	(England)	Islington	23 September 1970 (aged 28)	2	0	Burnley	1 June 1998	Free
Dave Savage	RM	(Republic of Ireland)	Dublin	30 July 1973 (aged 25)	30	5	Millwall	7 October 1998	£80,000
Duncan Spedding	LM	(England)	Camberley	7 September 1977 (aged 21)	29	1	Southampton	14 July 1998	Free
Michael Warner	CM	(England)	Harrogate	17 January 1974 (aged 25)	37	0	Tamworth	31 May 1995	Free
Forwards
Carlo Corazzin	FW	(Canada)	New Westminster	25 December 1971 (aged 27)	47	17	Plymouth Argyle	26 June 1998	Bosman
Steve Howard	FW	(England)	Durham	10 May 1976 (aged 22)	12	0	Hartlepool United	22 February 1999	£120,000
Christian Lee	FW	(England)	Aylesbury	8 October 1976 (aged 22)	74	10	Doncaster Rovers	13 July 1995	Free
David Seal	FW	(Australia)	Penrith, NSW	26 January 1972 (aged 27)	53	14	Bristol City	12 September 1997	£90,000
Paul Wilkinson	FW	(England)	Louth	30 October 1964 (aged 34)	20	1	Millwall	1 July 1998	Free
Kevin Wilson	FW	(Northern Ireland)	Banbury (ENG)	18 April 1961 (aged 38)	18	1	Walsall	28 July 1997	Free

== Competitions ==
=== Football League Division Two ===
==== League table ====
Pos	Team	Pld	W	D	L	GF	GA	GD	Pts	Qualification or relegation
1	Fulham (C, P)	46	31	8	7	79	32	+47	101	Promotion to the First Division
2	Walsall (P)	46	26	9	11	63	47	+16	87	Promotion to the First Division
3	Manchester City (O, P)	46	22	16	8	69	33	+36	82	Qualification for the Second Division play-offs
4	Gillingham	46	22	14	10	75	44	+31	80	Qualification for the Second Division play-offs
5	Preston North End	46	22	13	11	78	50	+28	79	Qualification for the Second Division play-offs
6	Wigan Athletic	46	22	10	14	75	48	+27	76	Qualification for the Second Division play-offs
7	Bournemouth	46	21	13	12	63	41	+22	76	
8	Stoke City	46	21	6	19	59	63	−4	69	
9	Chesterfield	46	17	13	16	46	44	+2	64	
10	Millwall	46	17	11	18	52	59	−7	62	
11	Reading	46	16	13	17	54	63	−9	61	
12	Luton Town	46	16	10	20	51	60	−9	58	
13	Bristol Rovers	46	13	17	16	65	56	+9	56	
14	Blackpool	46	14	14	18	44	54	−10	56	
15	Burnley	46	13	16	17	54	73	−19	55	
16	Notts County	46	14	12	20	52	61	−9	54	
17	Wrexham	46	13	14	19	43	62	−19	53	
18	Colchester United	46	12	16	18	52	70	−18	52	
19	Wycombe Wanderers	46	13	12	21	52	58	−6	51	
20	Oldham Athletic	46	14	9	23	48	66	−18	51	
21	York City (R)	46	13	11	22	56	80	−24	50	Relegation to the Third Division
22	Northampton Town (R)	46	10	18	18	43	57	−14	48	Relegation to the Third Division
23	Lincoln City (R)	46	13	7	26	42	74	−32	46	Relegation to the Third Division
24	Macclesfield Town (R)	46	11	10	25	43	63	−20	43	Relegation to the Third Division

Rules for classification: 1) Points; 2) Goals scored; 3) Goal difference
(C) Champions; (O) Play-off winners; (P) Promoted; (R) Relegated

==== Results summary ====
Overall								Home						Away					
Pld	W	D	L	GF	GA	GD	Pts	W	D	L	GF	GA	GD	W	D	L	GF	GA	GD
46	10	18	18	43	57	−14	48	4	12	7	26	31	−5	6	6	11	17	26	−9

Last updated: 14 April 2020.

==== League position by match ====
Round	1	2	3	4	5	6	7	8	9	10	11	12	13	14	15	16	17	18	19	20	21	22	23	24	25	26	27	28	29	30	31	32	33	34	35	36	37	38	39	40	41	42	43	44	45	46
Ground	H	A	H	A	H	A	A	H	A	H	A	H	A	A	H	A	H	A	H	A	H	A	A	H	A	A	A	H	H	A	H	H	H	A	A	H	A	H	A	H	H	A	H	H	A	H
Result	L	D	D	L	D	L	W	D	L	D	L	W	D	L	D	W	D	L	L	D	W	W	L	D	L	L	L	D	L	W	L	L	L	D	W	L	L	W	D	W	D	W	D	D	D	D
Position	19	18	22	22	21	22	19	20	20	19	22	19	19	19	21	19	19	21	21	21	19	18	18	17	18	20	20	20	21	21	21	22	22	22	22	22	24	21	22	21	21	20	20	20	20	22

Source: Rothmans Football Yearbook 1999-2000
A = Away; H = Home; W = Win; D = Draw; L = Loss

==== Matches ====
Win Draw Loss

8 August 1998 1	Northampton Town	1–3	Stoke City	Northampton
15:00 BST	C.Corazzin 11'		G.Kavanagh 7' (pen.); P.Thorne 63'; D.Crowe 83'	Stadium: Sixfields Stadium; Attendance: 6,661; Referee: Andy D'Urso

15 August 1998 2	Walsall	0–0	Northampton Town	Walsall
15:00 BST				Stadium: Bescot Stadium; Attendance: 4,360; Referee: Tony Leake

22 August 1998 3	Northampton Town	1–1	Notts County	Northampton
15:00 BST	R.Warburton 90'		S.Torpey 70'	Stadium: Sixfields Stadium; Attendance: 6,141; Referee: Mark Halsey

29 August 1998 4	Wrexham	1–0	Northampton Town	Wrexham, Wales
15:00 BST	P.Ward 52'			Stadium: Racecourse Ground; Attendance: 3,534; Referee: Matt Messias

31 August 1998 5	Northampton Town	0–0	Lincoln City	Northampton
19:45 BST				Stadium: Sixfields Stadium; Attendance: 5,964; Referee: Paul Danson

5 September 1998 6	Blackpool	2–1	Northampton Town	Blackpool
15:00 BST	P.Clarkson 71'; P.Thompson 82'		C.Corazzin 16' (pen.)	Stadium: Bloomfield Road; Attendance: 4,017; Referee: Mike Dean

8 September 1998 7	Gillingham	2–3	Northampton Town	Gillingham
19:45 BST	P.Smith 2', 56'		R.Hunter 17'; C.Corazzin 54'; D.Spedding 81'	Stadium: Priestfield; Attendance: 4,897; Referee: Rob Styles

12 September 1998 8	Northampton Town	1–1	Oldham Athletic	Northampton
15:00 BST	C.Freestone 56'		L.Duxbury 45'	Stadium: Sixfields Stadium; Attendance: 5,210; Referee: Paul Rejer

19 September 1998 9	Millwall	2–1	Northampton Town	Millwall, London
15:00 BST	N.Harris 49'; T.Cahill 61'		I.Sampson 31'	Stadium: The Den; Attendance: 5,997; Referee: Anthony Bates

26 September 1998 10	Northampton Town	2–2	Manchester City	Northampton
15:00 BST	D.Peer 30'; C.Corazzin 64'		P.Dickov 54'; S.Goater 88'	Stadium: Sixfields Stadium; Attendance: 7,557; Referee: Clive Wilkes

3 October 1998 11	Wigan Athletic	1–0	Northampton Town	Wigan
15:00 BST	T.Dobson 67' (o.g.)			Stadium: Springfield Park; Attendance: 4,396; Referee: Terry Heilbron

10 October 1998 12	Northampton Town	3–1	Bristol Rovers	Northampton
15:00 BST	C.Heggs 30'; C.Corazzin 44' (pen.); J.Hunt 52'		M.Meaker 21' (red card) 68'; T.Challis (red card) 90'	Stadium: Sixfields Stadium; Attendance: 6,023; Referee: Bill Jordan

17 October 1998 13	Bournemouth	1–1	Northampton Town	Bournemouth
15:00 BST	M.Stein 26'		D.Hodgson 49'	Stadium: Dean Court; Attendance: 6,362; Referee: Alan Butler

20 October 1998 14	Luton Town	1–0	Northampton Town	Luton
19:45 BST	G.Alexander 20'			Stadium: Kenilworth Road; Attendance: 6,087; Referee: M.Fletcher

24 October 1998 15	Northampton Town	1–1	Preston North End	Northampton
15:00 BST	J.Hunt 90'		C.Hill 7' (o.g.); J.Harris (red card) 82'	Stadium: Sixfields Stadium; Attendance: 6,085; Referee: T Jones

31 October 1998 16	Macclesfield Town	0–1	Northampton Town	Macclesfield
15:00 GMT	M.McDonald (red card) 88'		C.Corazzin 18'	Stadium: Moss Rose; Attendance: 3,201; Referee: Alan Wiley

7 November 1998 17	Northampton Town	1–1	Wycombe Wanderers	Northampton
15:00 GMT	C.Corazzin 2' (pen.)		N.Mohan 38'	Stadium: Sixfields Stadium; Attendance: 6,248; Referee: Steve Bennett

10 November 1998 18	Colchester United	1–0	Northampton Town	Colchester
19:45 GMT	D.Greene 88'			Stadium: Layer Road; Attendance: 3,597; Referee: Roger Furnandiz

21 November 1998 19	Northampton Town	0–1	Reading	Northampton
15:00 GMT			G.Brebner 61'	Stadium: Sixfields Stadium; Attendance: 5,970; Referee: Mike Dean

28 November 1998 20	York City	1–1	Northampton Town	York
15:00 GMT	R.Cresswell 71'		C.Corazzin 61'	Stadium: Bootham Crescent; Attendance: 2,656; Referee: Graham Frankland

12 December 1998 21	Northampton Town	1–0	Chesterfield	Northampton
15:00 GMT	L.Howey 71'			Stadium: Sixfields Stadium; Attendance: 5,282; Referee: David Crick

19 December 1998 22	Burnley	0–2	Northampton Town	Burnley
15:00 GMT			P.Wilkinson 71'; C.Corazzin 81'	Stadium: Turf Moor; Attendance: 8,783; Referee: Andy Hall

26 December 1998 23	Notts County	3–1	Northampton Town	Nottingham
15:00 GMT	K.Grant 1'; F.Tierney 6'; I.Richardson 44'		L.Howey 72'	Stadium: Meadow Lane; Attendance: 6,131; Referee: Ray Olivier

28 December 1998 24	Northampton Town	1–1	Fulham	Northampton
15:00 GMT	C.Freestone 68'		G.Horsfield 49'	Stadium: Sixfields Stadium; Attendance: 7,315; Referee: Mark Cowburn

9 January 1999 25	Stoke City	3–1	Northampton Town	Stoke-on-Trent
15:00 GMT	R.Wallace 56'; P.Thorne 74'; K.Lightbourne 84'		L.Howey 90'	Stadium: Britannia Stadium; Attendance: 11,180; Referee: David Pugh

23 January 1999 26	Lincoln City	1–0	Northampton Town	Lincoln
15:00 GMT	S.Holmes 35'			Stadium: Sincil Bank; Attendance: 4,608; Referee: Kenneth Leach

30 January 1999 27	Fulham	2–0	Northampton Town	Fulham, London
15:00 GMT	B.Hayles 18'; P.Albert 70'			Stadium: Craven Cottage; Attendance: 11,641; Referee: Mark Halsey

6 February 1999 28	Northampton Town	0–0	Blackpool	Northampton
15:00 GMT				Stadium: Sixfields Stadium; Attendance: 5,592; Referee: Guy Stretton

13 February 1999 29	Northampton Town	0–1	Gillingham	Northampton
15:00 GMT			P.Smith 49'	Stadium: Sixfields Stadium; Attendance: 5,981; Referee: Chris Foy

20 February 1999 30	Oldham Athletic	0–1	Northampton Town	Oldham
15:00 GMT			C.Corazzin 10' (pen.)	Stadium: Boundary Park; Attendance: 4,752; Referee: Graham Laws

23 February 1999 31	Northampton Town	0–1	Walsall	Northampton
19:45 GMT			D.Mavrak 65'	Stadium: Sixfields Stadium; Attendance: 5,631; Referee: William Burns
Note: Fixture was previously postponed on 16 January 1999 due to a waterlogged pitch.

27 February 1999 32	Northampton Town	1–2	Milllwall	Northampton
15:00 GMT	C.Corazzin 80'		S.Nethercott 59'; S.Reid (red card) 82'; R.Sadlier 87'	Stadium: Sixfields Stadium; Attendance: 5,490; Referee: Mick Pierce

2 March 1999 33	Northampton Town	0–2	Wrexham	Northampton
19:45 GMT	S.Howard (red card) 21'		J.Whitley 78'; R.Gibson 83'	Stadium: Sixfields Stadium; Attendance: 4,710; Referee: Scott Mathieson

6 March 1999 34	Manchester City	0–0	Northampton Town	Manchester
15:00 GMT	K.Horlock (red card) 30'			Stadium: Maine Road; Attendance: 27,999; Referee: Matt Messias

13 March 1999 35	Wycombe Wanderers	1–2	Northampton Town	High Wycombe
15:00 GMT	S.Brown (red card) 62'; A.Baird 15'		S.Parrish 15'; C.Corazzin 84'; J.Frain (red card) 90'	Stadium: Adams Park; Attendance: 4,861; Referee: Anthony Bates

20 March 1999 36	Northampton Town	0–2	Macclesfield Town	Northampton
15:00 GMT			S.Wood 62'; N.Sorvel 84'	Stadium: Sixfields Stadium; Attendance: 5,790; Referee: Lee Cable

27 March 1999 37	Preston North End	3–0	Northampton Town	Preston
15:00 GMT	S.Basham 36', 63'; J.Macken 70'			Stadium: Deepdale; Attendance: 10,686; Referee: M.Brandwood

2 April 1999 38	Northampton Town	2–1	Bournemouth	Northampton
19:45 BST	C.Lee 33'; C.Corazzin 37'		S.Robinson 17'	Stadium: Sixfields Stadium; Attendance: 6,858; Referee: Terry Heilbron

5 April 1999 39	Bristol Rovers	1–1	Northampton Town	Bristol
15:00 BST	G.Penrice 64'		C.Corazzin 6'; I.Hendon (red card) 58'	Stadium: Memorial Ground; Attendance: 6,580; Referee: David Crick

10 April 1999 40	Northampton Town	1–0	Luton Town	Northampton
15:00 BST	C.Corazzin 34'			Stadium: Sixfields Stadium; Attendance: 6,856; Referee: T.Jones

13 April 1999 41	Northampton Town	2–2	York City	Northampton
19:45 BST	L.Howey 39'; J.Wilson 51'		M.Lloyd-Williams 19'; S.Jordan 55'	Stadium: Sixfields Stadium; Attendance: 5,220; Referee: Eddie Lomas

17 April 1999 42	Reading	0–1	Northampton Town	Reading
15:00 BST			D.Savage 89'	Stadium: Madejski Stadium; Attendance: 10,132; Referee: Ray Olivier

24 April 1999 43	Northampton Town	3–3	Colchester United	Northampton
15:00 BST	D.Savage 18'; C.Corazzin 41' (pen.); L.Howey 63'		P.Buckle 3'; W.Aspinall 47' (pen.); K.Duguid 71'	Stadium: Sixfields Stadium; Attendance: 6,146; Referee: Graham Frankland

29 April 1999 44	Northampton Town	3–3	Wigan Athletic	Northampton
19:45 BST	D.Savage 7', 71'; M.O'Neill 58' (o.g.)		S.Haworth 9'; P.Rogers (red card) 37'; S.Barlow 47' (pen.); P.McGibbon 78'	Stadium: Sixfields Stadium; Attendance: 5,404; Referee: Bill Jordan

3 May 1999 45	Chesterfield	0–0	Northampton Town	Chesterfield
15:00 BST				Stadium: Saltergate; Attendance: 5,110; Referee: D Laws

8 May 1999 46	Northampton Town	2–2	Burnley	Northampton
15:00 BST	D.Savage 7'; L.Howey 80'		P.Cook 69' (pen.); A.Cooke 88'	Stadium: Sixfields Stadium; Attendance: 7,435; Referee: Andrew Butler

=== FA Cup ===
14 November 1998 First round	Northampton Town	2–1	Lancaster City	Northampton
15:00 GMT	D.Seal (red card) 2'; P.Thomson 55' (o.g.); I.Sampson 56'		P.Thomson 30'	Stadium: Sixfields Stadium; Referee: Andy D'Urso

5 December 1998 Second round	Yeovil Town	2–0	Northampton Town	Yeovil
15:00 GMT	S.Thompson 14'; W.Patmore 82'			Stadium: Huish Park; Referee: P.Richards

=== League Cup ===
11 August 1998 First round 1st leg	Northampton Town	2–1	Brighton & Hove Albion	Northampton
19:45 BST	C.Heggs 39'; C.Freestone 53'		S.Storer 47'	Stadium: Sixfields Stadium; Referee: John Kirkby

19 August 1998 First round 2nd leg	Brighton & Hove Albion	1–1 (a.e.t.)	Northampton Town	Gillingham
19:45 BST	R.Barker 48'		C.Heggs 97'	Stadium: Priestfield; Referee: Paul Taylor

15 September 1998 Second round 1st leg	Northampton Town	2–0	West Ham United	Northampton
19:45 BST	C.Freestone 77' (85)	Report		Stadium: Sixfields Stadium; Attendance: 7,254; Referee: Paul Alcock

22 September 1998 Second round 2nd leg	West Ham United	1–0	Northampton Town	Upton Park, London
19:45 BST	F.Lampard 90'	Report		Stadium: Boleyn Ground; Attendance: 25,435; Referee: Dermot Gallagher

27 October 1998 Third round	Northampton Town	1–3	Tottenham Hotspur	Northampton
19:45 GMT	S.Parrish 30'	Report	C.Armstrong 39' (83); S.Campbell 47'	Stadium: Sixfields Stadium; Attendance: 7,422; Referee: Graham Poll

=== League Trophy ===
16 December 1998 Second round (s)	Cambridge United	3–2	Northampton Town	Cambridge
19:45 GMT	R.Walker 18'; T.Benjamin 57'; M.Butler 60'		C.Corazzin 11'; C.Freestone 56'	Stadium: Abbey Stadium; Attendance: 2,391; Referee: Steve Baines

=== Appearances, goals and cards ===
Pos	Player	Division Two			FA Cup			League Cup			League Trophy			Total			Discipline	
Pos	Player	Starts	Sub	Goals	Starts	Sub	Goals	Starts	Sub	Goals	Starts	Sub	Goals	Starts	Sub	Goals	Booked	Sent off (straight red)
GK	Steve Francis	3	–	–	–	–	–	–	–	–	–	–	–	3	–	–	–	–
GK	Billy Turley	25	–	–	2	–	–	–	–	–	1	–	–	28	–	–	–	–
DF	Ian Clarkson	3	2	–	–	–	–	1	1	–	–	–	–	4	3	–	1	–
DF	Tony Dobson	8	3	–	–	–	–	–	1	–	–	–	–	8	4	–	–	–
DF	John Frain	40	1	–	2	–	–	4	–	–	1	–	–	47	1	–	5	1
DF	Ian Hendon	7	–	–	–	–	–	–	–	–	–	–	–	7	–	–	1	1
DF	Colin Hill	22	5	–	2	–	–	5	–	–	–	1	–	29	6	–	2	1
DF	Richard Hope	17	2	–	–	–	–	–	–	–	1	–	–	18	2	–	3	–
DF	Lee Howey	25	–	6	–	–	–	–	–	–	1	–	–	26	–	6	6	–
DF	Garry Hughes	–	–	–	–	1	–	–	–	–	–	–	–	–	1	–	–	–
DF	Ian Sampson	41	–	1	2	–	1	3	–	–	1	–	–	47	–	2	5	–
MF	Ali Gibb	30	11	–	2	–	–	5	–	–	–	–	–	37	11	–	3	–
MF	James Hunt	24	10	2	1	1	–	2	2	–	–	1	–	27	14	2	6	–
MF	Roy Hunter	15	3	1	1	–	–	2	–	–	–	–	–	18	3	1	4	–
MF	Damian Matthew	1	–	–	–	–	–	1	–	–	–	–	–	2	–	–	–	–
MF	Sean Parrish	33	–	1	1	–	–	3	–	1	–	–	–	37	–	2	6	–
MF	Dean Peer	21	5	1	–	–	–	3	–	–	1	–	–	25	5	1	4	–
MF	Dave Savage	18	9	5	2	–	–	–	–	–	1	–	–	21	9	5	2	–
MF	Duncan Spedding	15	9	1	–	–	–	2	2	–	1	–	–	18	11	1	1	–
MF	Michael Warner	5	5	–	–	1	–	–	2	–	1	–	–	6	8	–	1	–
FW	Carlo Corazzin	36	3	16	2	–	–	4	1	–	1	–	1	43	4	17	2	–
FW	Steve Howard	12	–	–	–	–	–	–	–	–	–	–	–	12	–	–	3	1
FW	Christian Lee	9	10	1	1	–	–	–	–	–	–	–	–	10	10	1	4	–
FW	David Seal	5	1	–	1	–	–	–	–	–	–	–	–	6	1	–	1	1
FW	Paul Wilkinson	12	3	1	2	–	–	2	1	–	–	–	–	16	4	1	1	–
FW	Kevin Wilson	8	–	1	–	–	–	–	–	–	–	–	–	8	–	1	–	–
Players who left before end of season:
GK	Andy Woodman	18	–	–	–	–	–	5	–	–	–	–	–	23	–	–	–	–
DF	Charlie Bishop	4	–	–	–	–	–	2	–	–	–	–	–	6	–	–	2	–
DF	Doug Hodgson	7	1	1	1	–	–	1	–	–	–	–	–	9	1	1	2	–
DF	Ray Warburton	13	–	1	–	–	–	4	–	–	–	–	–	17	–	1	3	–
DF	Chris Wilder	1	–	–	–	–	–	–	–	–	–	–	–	1	–	–	–	–
DF	Tony Witter	1	3	–	–	–	–	–	1	–	–	–	–	1	4	–	1	–
MF	Jason Dozzell	–	–	–	–	–	–	–	–	–	–	–	–	–	–	–	–	–
FW	Andy Clarke	2	2	–	–	–	–	–	–	–	–	–	–	2	2	–	–	–
FW	Chris Freestone	17	14	2	–	2	–	4	–	3	1	–	1	22	16	6	5	–
FW	Carl Heggs	8	5	1	–	–	–	2	1	2	–	–	–	10	6	3	4	–
