= 2001–02 Northampton Town F.C. season =

Northampton Town
2001–02 season
- Manager: Kevin Wilson; Kevan Broadhurst
- Stadium: Sixfields Stadium
- Division Two: 20th
- FA Cup: Second round
- League Cup: Second round
- League Trophy: Second round
- Top goalscorer: League: Jamie Forrester (17); All: Jamie Forrester (18)
- Highest home attendance: 6,723 vs Cambridge United
- Lowest home attendance: 2,142 vs Barnet

The 2001–02 season was Northampton Town's 105th season in their history and the second successive season in the Second Division. Alongside competing in Division Two, the club also participated in the FA Cup, League Cup and Football League Trophy.

== Players ==
As of match played 20 April 2002.

No.	Name	Position	Nat.	Place of Birth	Date of Birth (Age)	Apps	Goals	Previous club	Date signed	Fee
Goalkeepers
1	Keith Welch	GK	(England)	Bolton	3 October 1968 (aged 33)	127	0	Bristol City	21 June 1999	Free
15	Adam Sollitt	GK	(England)	Sheffield	22 June 1977 (aged 24)	20	0	Kettering Town	25 July 2000	£30,000
24	Mark Bunn	GK	(England)	Kettering	16 November 1984 (aged 17)	0	0	Apprentice	21 August 2001	N/A
Defenders
2	Gerard Lavin	RB	(England)	Corby	5 February 1974 (aged 28)	3	0	Bristol City	29 May 2001	Free
3	Duncan Spedding	LB	(England)	Camberley	7 September 1977 (aged 24)	130	1	Southampton	14 July 1998	Free
4	Ian Sampson	CB	(England)	Wakefield	14 November 1968 (aged 33)	363	28	Sunderland	5 August 1994	£30,000
6	John Frain	LB	(England)	Birmingham	8 October 1968 (aged 33)	228	7	Birmingham City	Summer 1997	Free
16	Daryl Burgess	FB	(England)	Birmingham	24 January 1971 (aged 31)	40	1	West Bromwich Albion	27 June 2001	Free
17	Richard Hope	CB	(England)	Stockton-on-Tees	22 June 1978 (aged 23)	125	6	Darlington	18 December 1998	Undisclosed
22	Paul Dempsey	LB	(England)	The Wirral	3 December 1981 (aged 20)	29	0	Sheffield United	22 March 2001	Undisclosed
27	Chris Marsh	RB	(England)	Dudley	14 January 1970 (aged 32)	28	0	Wycombe Wanderers	6 September 2001	£10,000
Midfielders
7	Paul McGregor	RW	(England)	Liverpool	17 December 1974 (aged 27)	45	5	Plymouth Argyle	8 June 2001	Free
8	James Hunt	CM	(England)	Derby	17 December 1976 (aged 25)	205	10	Notts County	1 August 1997	Free
11	Roy Hunter	CM	(England)	Saltburn-by-the-Sea	29 October 1973 (aged 28)	211	20	West Bromwich Albion	2 August 1995	Free
14	John Hodge	W	(England)	Ormskirk	1 April 1969 (aged 33)	65	2	Gillingham	6 March 2000	£25,000
20	Chris Hargreaves	CM	(England)	Cleethorpes	12 May 1972 (aged 29)	77	3	Plymouth Argyle	27 June 2000	Free
23	Chris Carruthers	LM	(England)	Kettering	19 August 1983 (aged 18)	17	1	Apprentice	1 August 2000	N/A
Forwards
9	Sam Parkin	FW	(England)	Roehampton	14 March 1981 (aged 21)	46	5	Chelsea	3 July 2001	Loan
10	Marco Gabbiadini	FW	(England)	Nottingham	20 January 1968 (aged 34)	89	16	Darlington	27 June 2000	Free
18	Jamie Forrester	FW	(England)	Bradford	1 November 1974 (aged 27)	136	50	FC Utrecht	27 June 2000	£150,000
19	Derek Asamoah	FW	(Ghana)	Accra	1 May 1981 (aged 20)	44	3	Slough Town	25 July 2001	Free
33	Steve Morison	FW	(England)	Enfield	29 August 1983 (aged 18)	1	0	Apprentice	27 August 2001	N/A

== Competitions ==
=== Football League Division Two ===
==== League table ====
Pos	Team	Pld	W	D	L	GF	GA	GD	Pts	Promotion or relegation
18	Chesterfield	46	13	13	20	53	65	−12	52	
19	Notts County	46	13	11	22	59	71	−12	50	
20	Northampton Town	46	14	7	25	54	79	−25	49	
21	Bournemouth (R)	46	10	14	22	56	71	−15	44	Relegation to Football League Third Division
22	Bury (R)	46	11	11	24	43	75	−32	44	Relegation to Football League Third Division

Rules for classification: In the Football League goals scored (GF) takes precedence over goal difference (GD).
(R) Relegated

==== Results summary ====
Overall								Home						Away					
Pld	W	D	L	GF	GA	GD	Pts	W	D	L	GF	GA	GD	W	D	L	GF	GA	GD
46	14	7	25	54	79	−25	49	9	4	10	30	33	−3	5	3	15	24	46	−22

Last updated: 22 March 2022.
Source: 11v11.com

==== League position by match ====
Round	1	2	3	4	5	6	7	8	9	10	11	12	13	14	15	16	17	18	19	20	21	22	23	24	25	26	27	28	29	30	31	32	33	34	35	36	37	38	39	40	41	42	43	44	45	46
Ground	H	A	H	A	H	A	H	A	A	H	H	A	H	A	H	A	H	A	A	H	A	H	A	H	H	H	A	H	A	A	H	A	H	A	H	H	A	A	A	H	A	H	A	H	A	H
Result	L	L	L	L	W	L	L	L	W	L	D	L	W	W	L	D	L	L	L	L	L	W	L	L	L	D	W	W	W	L	D	L	W	D	W	L	W	L	L	W	L	W	D	W	L	D
Position	24	24	24	24	18	23	24	24	23	23	22	22	21	21	22	21	22	23	24	24	24	23	23	24	24	24	23	22	21	22	22	22	21	21	20	20	20	21	21	19	20	19	19	19	19	20

Source: 11v11.com
A = Away; H = Home; W = Win; D = Draw; L = Loss

==== Matches ====
Win Draw Loss

11 August 2001 1	Northampton Town	0–3	Bristol City	Northampton
15:00 BST	J.Hunt (red card) 34'	Report	T.Thorpe 6', 22' (pen.), 28'	Stadium: Sixfields Stadium; Attendance: 5,528; Referee: Paul Alcock

18 August 2001 2	Stoke City	2–0	Northampton Town	Stoke-on-Trent
15:00 BST	A.Cooke 52'; P.Thorne 54'	Report		Stadium: Britannia Stadium; Attendance: 12,845; Referee: Mark Cowburn

25 August 2001 3	Northampton Town	0–2	Notts County	Northampton
15:00 BST		Report	I.Baraclough 3'; M.Stallard 90'	Stadium: Sixfields Stadium; Attendance: 4,648; Referee: David Crick

28 August 2001 4	Oldham Athletic	4–2	Northampton Town	Oldham
19:45 BST	S.Balmer 6'; P.Rickers 35'; L.Duxbury 63'; M.Tipton 78'	Report	R.Hope 53', 90'	Stadium: Boundary Park; Attendance: 4,941; Referee: Frazer Stretton

31 August 2001 5	Northampton Town	2–0	Brighton & Hove Albion	Northampton
19:45 BST	M.Gabbiadini 74'; D.Asamoah 90'	Report		Stadium: Sixfields Stadium; Attendance: 5,408; Referee: Roger Furnandiz

8 September 2001 6	Colchester United	3–1	Northampton Town	Colchester
15:00 BST	K.Rapley 7'; S.McGleish 8' (pen.); R.Hope 42' (o.g.); D.Gregory (red card) 55'	Report	C.Hargreaves 78'	Stadium: Layer Road; Attendance: 3,705; Referee: Paul Rejer

15 September 2001 7	Northampton Town	0–2	Chesterfield	Northampton
15:00 BST	M.Gabbiadini (red card) 18'	Report	L.Beckett 15'; I.Breckin 79'	Stadium: Sixfields Stadium; Attendance: 4,535; Referee: Mike Jones

18 September 2001 8	Cardiff City	2–0	Northampton Town	Cardiff, Wales
19:45 BST	G.Kavanagh 28'; P.Brayson 72' (pen.)	Report		Stadium: Ninian Park; Attendance: 11,232; Referee: Trevor Parkes

22 September 2001 9	Port Vale	0–1	Northampton Town	Burslem
15:00 BST		Report	R.Hunter 73'	Stadium: Vale Park; Attendance: 4,419; Referee: Alan Kaye

25 September 2001 10	Northampton Town	1–3	Blackpool	Northampton
19:45 BST	D.Burgess 83'	Report	B.Ormerod 31', 45'; G.Fenton 79'	Stadium: Sixfields Stadium; Attendance: 5,103; Referee: Phil Prosser

28 September 2001 11	Northampton Town	1–1	Swindon Town	Northampton
15:00 BST	R.Hunter 66'	Report	G.Grazioli 48'	Stadium: Sixfields Stadium; Attendance: George Cain; Referee: 5,104

7 October 2001 12	Peterborough United	2–0	Northampton Town	Peterborough
14:00 BST	J.Bullard 45' (pen.); A.Clarke 54'	Report		Stadium: London Road; Attendance: 8,101; Referee: Barry Knight

13 October 2001 13	Northampton Town	4–1	Tranmere Rovers	Northampton
15:00 BST	J.Forrester 9', 72'; R.Hope 45'; P.McGregor 48'	Report	S.Flynn 45'	Stadium: Sixfields Stadium; Attendance: 4,636; Referee: Lee Cable

20 October 2001 14	Queens Park Rangers	0–1	Northampton Town	White City, London
15:00 BST		Report	J.Hunt 11'	Stadium: Loftus Road; Attendance: 10,444; Referee: Mick Fletcher

23 October 2001 15	Northampton Town	0–3	Huddersfield Town	Northampton
19:45 BST		Report	A.Booth 30', 45', 70'	Stadium: Sixfields Stadium; Attendance: 5,926; Referee: Mike Ryan

27 October 2001 16	Cambridge United	3–3	Northampton Town	Cambridge
15:00 BST	D.Kitson 18'; A.One 29', 42'	Report	M.Gabbiadini 38'; J.Forrester 71' (pen.), 87' (pen.)	Stadium: Abbey Stadium; Attendance: 3,682; Referee: Bill Jordan

3 November 2001 17	Northampton Town	0–2	Reading	Northampton
15:00 GMT		Report	J.Cureton 52'; M.Butler 90'	Stadium: Sixfields Stadium; Attendance: 5,162; Referee: Paul Rejer

11 November 2001 18	Bury	2–1	Northampton Town	Bury
15:00 GMT	P.Kenny (red card) 70'; I.Lawson 77'; D.Swailes 82'	Report	R.Hope 11'; C.Hargreaves (red card) 33'	Stadium: Gigg Lane; Attendance: 3,539; Referee: Trevor Parkes

20 November 2001 19	Wycombe Wanderers	2–1	Northampton Town	High Wycombe
19:45 GMT	A.Rammell 20', 85'	Report	M.Gabbiadini 39'	Stadium: Adams Park; Attendance: 5,817; Referee: Grant Hegley

24 November 2001 20	Northampton Town	0–2	Wigan Athletic	Northampton
15:00 GMT		Report	T.Dinning 28'; S.Haworth 57'	Stadium: Sixfields Stadium; Attendance: 4,267; Referee: Clive Penton

1 December 2001 21	Wrexham	3–2	Northampton Town	Wrexham, Wales
15:00 GMT	B.Carey 43'; M.Chalk 56' (pen.); D.Ferguson 86'	Report	J.Forrester 14'; P.McGregor 51'; J.Hunt (red card) 78'	Stadium: Racecourse Ground; Attendance: 2,708; Referee: Howard Webb

15 December 2001 22	Northampton Town	1–0	AFC Bournemouth	Northampton
15:00 GMT	J.Forrester 81'	Report		Stadium: Sixfields Stadium; Attendance: 3,909; Referee: Ray Olivier

21 December 2001 23	Brentford	3–0	Northampton Town	Brentford
19:45 GMT	P.Evans 76' (pen.); B.Burgess 80'; L.Owusu 88'	Report		Stadium: Griffin Park; Attendance: 5,142; Referee: Keith Hill

26 December 2001 24	Northampton Town	2–3	Colchester United	Northampton
15:00 GMT	R.Hope 36'; J.Forrester 80'	Report	I.Sampson 45' (o.g.); G.Barrett 50', 66'	Stadium: Sixfields Stadium; Attendance: 4,740; Referee: Tony Bates

29 December 2001 25	Northampton Town	0–1	Oldham Athletic	Northampton
15:00 GMT	K.Welch (red card) 45'	Report	D.Eyres 80'	Stadium: Sixfields Stadium; Attendance: 4,760; Referee: Joe Ross

13 January 2002 26	Northampton Town	1–1	Stoke City	Northampton
15:00 GMT	S.Parkin 82'	Report	M.Goodfellow 36'	Stadium: Sixfields Stadium; Attendance: 5,636; Referee: Graham Salisbury

19 January 2002 27	Bristol City	1–3	Northampton Town	Bristol
15:00 GMT	T.Thorpe 62'	Report	J.Forrester 36' (pen.), 37'; J.Hunt 69'	Stadium: Ashton Gate; Attendance: 11,733; Referee: Lee Cable

22 January 2002 28	Northampton Town	1–0	Brentford	Northampton
19:45 GMT	M.Gabbiadini (red card) 83'; D.Asamoah 86'	Report		Stadium: Sixfields Stadium; Attendance: 4,184; Referee: Phil Joslin

29 January 2002 29	Notts County	0–3	Northampton Town	Nottingham
19:45 GMT	N.Fenton (red card) 68'	Report	M.Gabbiadini 12'; J.Forrester 64' (pen.), 69' (pen.)	Stadium: Meadow Lane; Attendance: 4,182; Referee: Mark Cowburn
Note: Fixture was previously postponed on January 5, 2002 due to a frozen pitch.

2 February 2002 30	Swindon Town	2–1	Northampton Town	Swindon
15:00 GMT	M.Gabbiadini 5' (o.g.); S.Davis (red card) 60'; D.Invincibile 64'	Report	J.Forrester 81'	Stadium: County Ground; Attendance: 6,585; Referee: Mark Cooper

9 February 2002 31	Northampton Town	2–2	Queens Park Rangers	Northampton
15:00 GMT	R.Hunter (red card) 11'; D.Asamoah 78'; S.Parkin 88'	Report	K.Connolly 12' (pen.), 21'	Stadium: Sixfields Stadium; Attendance: 6,424; Referee: Rob Harris

12 February 2002 32	Tranmere Rovers	2–0	Northampton Town	Birkenhead
19:45 GMT	J.Price 65'; W.Allison 87'	Report		Stadium: Prenton Park; Attendance: 7,739; Referee: Trevor Parkes

19 February 2002 33	Northampton Town	2–1	Peterborough United	Northampton
19:45 GMT	S.Parkin 17'; J.Forrester 38'	Report	J.Bullard 2'	Stadium: Sixfields Stadium; Attendance: 6,064; Referee: Barry Knight

23 February 2002 34	Chesterfield	2–2	Northampton Town	Chesterfield
15:00 GMT	M.Ebdon 13'; J.Burt 53'	Report	R.Hope 3'; J.Forrester 22'	Stadium: Saltergate; Attendance: 4,186; Referee: Roy Pearson

26 February 2002 35	Northampton Town	1–0	Port Vale	Northampton
19:45 GMT	J.Forrester 19'	Report		Stadium: Sixfields Stadium; Attendance: 5,155; Referee: Scott Mathieson

2 March 2002 36	Northampton Town	1–2	Cardiff City	Northampton
15:00 GMT	M.Gabbiadini 35'	Report	L.Maxwell 32'; A.Campbell 37'	Stadium: Sixfields Stadium; Attendance: 5,495; Referee: Steve Bennett

5 March 2002 37	Blackpool	1–2	Northampton Town	Blackpool
19:45 GMT	G.Fenton 59'	Report	M.Gabbiadini 8', 54'	Stadium: Bloomfield Road; Attendance: 4,924; Referee: Howard Webb

9 March 2002 38	AFC Bournemouth	5–1	Northampton Town	Bournemouth
15:00 GMT	W.Feeney 33', 74'; J.Tindall 55'; D.Holmes 65'; S.Purches 90'	Report	D.Spedding (red card) 39'; P.McGregor 45'	Stadium: Dean Court; Attendance: 6,322; Referee: Phil Richards

12 March 2002 39	Brighton & Hove Albion	2–0	Northampton Town	Brighton
19:45 GMT	B.Zamora 37'; S.Morgan 59'	Report		Stadium: Withdean Stadium; Attendance: 6,363; Referee: David Crick
Note: Fixture was previously postponed on January 1, 2002 due to icy weather.

16 March 2002 40	Northampton Town	4–1	Wrexham	Northampton
15:00 GMT	J.Hunt 42'; R.Hunter 77' (pen.), 90' (pen.); S.Parkin 82'	Report	L.Trundle 21'; K.Sharp (red card) 37'; D.Bennett (red card) 90'	Stadium: Sixfields Stadium; Attendance: 5,029; Referee: Rob Styles

23 March 2002 41	Huddersfield Town	2–0	Northampton Town	Huddersfield
15:00 GMT	L.Knight 27', 33'	Report		Stadium: Kirklees Stadium; Attendance: 10,783; Referee: Ray Olivier

29 March 2002 42	Northampton Town	1–0	Bury	Northampton
19:45 GMT	J.Hunt 58'	Report		Stadium: Sixfields Stadium; Attendance: 6,522; Referee: Matt Messias

1 April 2002 43	Reading	0–0	Northampton Town	Reading
15:00 BST		Report		Stadium: Madejski Stadium; Attendance: 16,495; Referee: Bill Jordan

6 April 2002 44	Northampton Town	4–1	Wycombe Wanderers	Northampton
15:00 BST	C.Hargreaves 52', 65'; J.Forrester 77'; C.Carruthers 84'	Report	G.Holligan 17'	Stadium: Sixfields Stadium; Attendance: 5,851; Referee: Steve Tomlin

13 April 2002 45	Wigan Athletic	3–0	Northampton Town	Wigan
15:00 BST	J.De Vos 7'; N.Ellington 45'; S.Green 69'	Report		Stadium: JJB Stadium; Attendance: 5,938; Referee: Mark Cooper

20 April 2002 46	Northampton Town	2–2	Cambridge United	Northampton
15:00 BST	J.Forrester 23' (pen.); J.Hodge 90'	Report	T.Youngs 4', 71'	Stadium: Sixfields Stadium; Attendance: 6,723; Referee: Andy D'Urso

=== FA Cup ===
17 November 2001 First round	Torquay United	1–2	Northampton Town	Torquay
15:00 GMT	K.Hill 82'	Report	M.Gabbiadini 28', 35'	Stadium: Plainmoor; Attendance: 2,241; Referee: John Brandwood

9 December 2001 Second round	Canvey Island	1–0	Northampton Town	Canvey Island
13:00 GMT	N.Gregory 48'	Report		Stadium: Park Lane; Attendance: 3,232; Referee: Paul Taylor

=== League Cup ===
21 August 2001 First round	Northampton Town	2–1 (a.e.t.)	Queens Park Rangers	Northampton
19:45 BST	J.Forrester 90'; P.McGregor 110'	Report	I.Evatt 16' (o.g.)	Stadium: Sixfields Stadium; Attendance: 4,638; Referee: Steve Baines

11 September 2001 Second round	Middlesbrough	3–1	Northampton Town	Middlesbrough
19:45 BST	D.Murphy 54'; S.Németh 62'; M.Wilson 82'	Report	S.Parkin 79'	Stadium: Riverside Stadium; Attendance: 3,915; Referee: Phil Richards

=== League Trophy ===
16 October 2001 First round	Northampton Town	2–0	Oxford United	Northampton
19:45 GMT	J.Hunt 34'; P.McGregor 45'	Report		Stadium: Sixfields Stadium; Attendance: 2,640; Referee: Brian Curson

30 October 2001 Second round	Northampton Town	0–1	Barnet	Northampton
19:45 GMT		Report	L.Flynn 57'	Stadium: Sixfields Stadium; Attendance: 2,142; Referee: Rob Harris

=== Appearances, goals and cards ===
No.	Pos	Player	Division Two			FA Cup			League Cup			League Trophy			Total			Discipline	
No.	Pos	Player	Starts	Sub	Goals	Starts	Sub	Goals	Starts	Sub	Goals	Starts	Sub	Goals	Starts	Sub	Goals	Booked	Sent off (straight red)
1	GK	Keith Welch	38	–	–	2	–	–	–	–	–	2	–	–	42	–	–	1	2
2	RB	Gerard Lavin	2	–	–	–	–	–	1	–	–	–	–	–	3	–	–	2	–
3	LB	John Frain	25	2	–	2	–	–	1	–	–	2	–	–	30	2	–	1	–
4	CB	Ian Sampson	24	3	–	2	–	–	–	–	–	–	–	–	26	3	–	8	–
6	LB	Duncan Spedding	22	1	–	2	–	–	2	–	–	1	–	–	27	1	–	7	1
7	RM	Paul McGregor	37	2	3	–	2	–	1	1	1	2	–	1	40	5	5	1	–
8	CM	James Hunt	38	–	4	2	–	–	2	–	–	2	–	1	44	–	5	9	2
9	ST	Sam Parkin	31	9	4	–	2	–	2	–	1	2	–	–	35	11	5	3	–
10	ST	Marco Gabbiadini	30	5	7	2	–	2	1	–	–	1	1	–	34	6	9	9	2
11	CM	Roy Hunter	38	2	4	2	–	–	1	–	–	1	–	–	42	2	4	3	1
14	RM	John Hodge	4	15	1	–	–	–	–	–	–	–	2	–	4	17	1	1	–
15	GK	Adam Sollitt	8	2	–	–	–	–	2	–	–	–	–	–	10	2	–	–	–
16	RB	Daryl Burgess	36	–	1	2	–	–	–	–	–	2	–	–	40	–	1	8	–
17	CB	Richard Hope	35	7	6	2	–	–	2	–	–	2	–	–	41	7	6	5	–
18	ST	Jamie Forrester	40	3	17	2	–	–	2	–	1	1	–	–	45	3	18	4	–
19	ST	Derek Asamoah	3	36	3	–	1	–	–	2	–	–	2	–	3	41	3	–	–
20	CM	Chris Hargreaves	38	1	3	1	–	–	2	–	–	1	–	–	42	1	3	6	1
21	MF	Richie Lopes	–	–	–	–	–	–	–	–	–	–	–	–	–	–	–	–	–
22	LB	Paul Dempsey	13	7	–	–	–	–	1	1	–	1	–	–	15	8	–	2	–
23	LM	Chris Carruthers	6	7	1	–	–	–	–	–	–	1	–	–	6	7	1	–	–
24	ST	Danny Lowe	–	–	–	–	–	–	–	–	–	–	–	–	–	–	–	–	–
25	GK	Mark Bunn	–	–	–	–	–	–	–	–	–	–	–	–	–	–	–	–	–
26	CM	Aaran Cavill	–	1	–	–	–	–	–	–	–	–	–	–	–	1	–	–	–
27	CB	Chris Marsh	26	–	–	1	–	–	–	–	–	1	–	–	28	–	–	4	–
28	MF	Chris Thompson	–	–	–	–	–	–	–	1	–	–	–	–	–	1	–	–	–
29	CM	Michael Laws	–	–	–	–	–	–	–	–	–	–	–	–	–	–	–	–	–
30	DF	Bobby White	–	–	–	–	–	–	–	–	–	–	–	–	–	–	–	–	–
31	ST	Ryan Nash	–	–	–	–	–	–	–	–	–	–	–	–	–	–	–	–	–
33	ST	Steve Morison	–	1	–	–	–	–	–	–	–	–	–	–	–	1	–	–	–
Players no longer at the club:
12	LM	Robert Wolleaston	2	5	–	–	–	–	–	1	–	–	–	–	2	6	–	–	–
5	CB	Ian Evatt	10	1	–	–	–	–	2	–	–	–	–	–	12	1	–	1	–
