= 2000–01 Northampton Town F.C. season =

Northampton Town
2000–01 season
- Chairman: Barry Stonhill
- Manager: Kevin Wilson
- Stadium: Sixfields Stadium
- Division Two: 18th
- FA Cup: Second round
- League Cup: First round
- League Trophy: First round
- Top goalscorer: League: Jamie Forrester (17); All: Jamie Forrester (19)
- Highest home attendance: 7,079 vs Peterborough United
- Lowest home attendance: 3,847 vs Fulham

The 2000–01 season was Northampton Town's 104th season in their history and the first season back in the Second Division after promotion the previous season. Alongside competing in Division Two, the club also participated in the FA Cup, League Cup and Football League Trophy.

== Players ==
As of match played 5 May 2001.

No.	Name	Position	Nat.	Place of birth	Date of birth (age)	Apps	Goals	Previous club	Date signed	Fee
Goalkeepers
1	Keith Welch	GK	(England)	Bolton	3 October 1968 (aged 32)	84	0	Bristol City	21 June 1999	Free
15	Adam Sollitt	GK	(England)	Sheffield	22 June 1977 (aged 23)	12	0	Kettering Town	25 July 2000	£30,000
Defenders
3	John Frain	LB	(England)	Birmingham	8 October 1968 (aged 32)	196	7	Birmingham City	Summer 1997	Free
4	Ian Sampson	CB	(England)	Wakefield	14 November 1968 (aged 32)	334	28	Sunderland	5 August 1994	£30,000
6	Duncan Spedding	LB	(England)	Camberley	7 September 1977 (aged 23)	106	1	Southampton	14 July 1998	Free
16	Garry Hughes	RB	(England)	Birmingham	19 November 1979 (aged 21)	25	1	Apprentice	7 July 1998	N/A
17	Richard Hope	CB	(England)	Stockton-on-Tees	22 June 1978 (aged 22)	88	6	Darlington	18 December 1998	Undisclosed
21	Richard Green	CB	(England)	Wolverhampton	22 November 1967 (aged 33)	65	2	Walsall	7 January 2000	Free
27	Paul Dempsey	LB	(England)	The Wirral	3 December 1981 (aged 19)	6	0	Sheffield United	22 March 2001	Undisclosed
Midfielders
8	James Hunt	CM	(England)	Derby	17 December 1976 (aged 24)	160	8	Notts County	1 August 1997	Free
11	Roy Hunter	CM	(England)	Saltburn-by-the-Sea	29 October 1973 (aged 27)	167	16	West Bromwich Albion	2 August 1995	Free
14	John Hodge	W	(England)	Ormskirk	1 April 1969 (aged 32)	29	1	Gillingham	6 March 2000	£25,000
20	Chris Hargreaves	CM	(England)	Cleethorpes	12 May 1972 (aged 28)	35	0	Plymouth Argyle	27 June 2000	Free
23	James Gould	W	(England)	Kettering	15 January 1982 (aged 19)	3	1	Apprentice	13 July 1999	N/A
24	Ryan Thompson	W	(England)	Lambeth	24 June 1982 (aged 18)	3	0	Apprentice	1 July 1999	N/A
30	Chris Carruthers	LM	(England)	Kettering	19 August 1983 (aged 17)	3	0	Apprentice	1 August 2000	N/A
Forwards
10	Marco Gabbiadini	FW	(England)	Nottingham	20 January 1968 (aged 33)	49	7	Darlington	27 June 2000	Free
18	Jamie Forrester	FW	(England)	Bradford	1 November 1974 (aged 26)	57	25	FC Utrecht	27 June 2000	£150,000
19	Andy Morrow	FW	(Northern Ireland)	Bangor	5 October 1980 (aged 20)	10	0	Apprentice	16 December 1998	N/A
22	Kevin Wilson	FW	(Northern Ireland)	Banbury (ENG)	18 April 1961 (aged 40)	35	2	Walsall	28 July 1997	Free

== Competitions ==
=== Football League Division Two ===
==== League table ====
Pos	Team	Pld	W	D	L	GF	GA	GD	Pts
16	Bury	46	16	10	20	45	59	−14	58
17	Colchester United	46	15	12	19	55	59	−4	57
18	Northampton Town	46	15	12	19	46	59	−13	57
19	Cambridge United	46	14	11	21	61	77	−16	53
20	Swindon Town	46	13	13	20	47	65	−18	52

Rules for classification: 1) Points; 2) Goal difference; 3) Goals scored

==== Results summary ====
Overall								Home						Away					
Pld	W	D	L	GF	GA	GD	Pts	W	D	L	GF	GA	GD	W	D	L	GF	GA	GD
46	15	12	19	46	59	−13	57	9	6	8	26	28	−2	6	6	11	20	31	−11

==== League position by match ====
Round	1	2	3	4	5	6	7	8	9	10	11	12	13	14	15	16	17	18	19	20	21	22	23	24	25	26	27	28	29	30	31	32	33	34	35	36	37	38	39	40	41	42	43	44	45	46
Ground	H	A	H	A	A	A	H	A	H	A	A	H	A	H	A	H	H	A	H	A	A	H	H	A	A	H	A	H	A	H	A	H	H	H	A	H	A	A	H	A	H	A	H	H	A	H
Result	D	L	W	L	W	W	W	L	D	W	D	W	W	L	W	D	L	L	L	L	W	W	D	D	D	W	L	D	D	L	L	D	W	W	L	W	D	L	L	D	L	L	W	L	L	L
Position	11	20	9	15	13	7	6	11	10	9	9	9	7	7	6	6	7	9	9	11	9	8	8	8	8	8	8	8	8	9	9	9	9	8	9	9	8	9	11	11	12	14	12	14	15	18

Source: 11v11.com
A = Away; H = Home; W = Win; D = Draw; L = Loss

==== Matches ====
Win Draw Loss

12 August 2000 1	Northampton Town	1–1	Brentford	Northampton
15:00 BST	J.Forrester 58'	Report	I.Ingimarsson 80'	Stadium: Sixfields Stadium; Attendance: 6,379; Referee: Eddie Wolstenholme

19 August 2000 2	Wycombe Wanderers	1–0	Northampton Town	High Wycombe
15:00 BST	S.Brown 51' (pen.)	Report		Stadium: Adams Park; Attendance: 4,806; Referee: Paul Alcock

26 August 2000 3	Northampton Town	2–0	Reading	Northampton
15:00 BST	J.Forrester 32', 76'	Report		Stadium: Sixfields Stadium; Attendance: 5,728; Referee: Phil Joslin

28 August 2000 4	Bury	1–0	Northampton Town	Bury, Greater Manchester
15:00 BST	D.Bullock 72'	Report		Stadium: Gigg Lane; Attendance: 3,182; Referee: George Cain

9 September 2000 5	Luton Town	0–2	Northampton Town	Luton
15:00 BST		Report	J.Forrester 38'; S.Howard 60'	Stadium: Kenilworth Road; Attendance: 6,712; Referee: Roger Furnandiz

12 September 2000 6	Millwall	0–1	Northampton Town	Millwall, London
19:45 BST		Report	M.Gabbiadini 60'	Stadium: The New Den; Attendance: 7,064; Referee: Steve Tomlin

16 September 2000 7	Northampton Town	1–0	Notts County	Northampton
15:00 BST	S.Howard 69'	Report	I.Richardson (red card) 57'	Stadium: Sixfields Stadium; Attendance: 5,703; Referee: Paul Danson

23 September 2000 8	Wigan Athletic	2–1	Northampton Town	Wigan
15:00 BST	S.Haworth 3'; A.Liddell 45'	Report	I.Hendon 24' (pen.)	Stadium: JJB Stadium; Attendance: 6,294; Referee: Paul Robinson

30 September 2000 9	Northampton Town	2–2	Wrexham	Northampton
15:00 BST	S.Howard 32'; J.Forrester 87'	Report	M.Chalk 4'; M.McGregor 18'	Stadium: Sixfields Stadium; Attendance: 5,595; Referee: Uriah Rennie

14 October 2000 10	Bristol Rovers	0–1	Northampton Town	Horfield, Bristol
15:00 BST		Report	J.Forrester 76'	Stadium: Memorial Stadium; Attendance: 7,704; Referee: Paul Rejer

17 October 2000 11	Port Vale	2–2	Northampton Town	Burslem
19:45 BST	A.Tankard 11'; V.Viljanen 61'	Report	J.Forrester 5'; M.Gabbiadini 32'	Stadium: Vale Park; Attendance: 4,215; Referee: Mike Pike

21 October 2000 12	Northampton Town	2–1	Oldham Athletic	Northampton
15:00 BST	J.Forrester 26'; G.Hughes 81'	Report	C.Dudley 65'	Stadium: Sixfields Stadium; Attendance: 5,677; Referee: Lee Cable

24 October 2000 13	Cambridge United	1–2	Northampton Town	Cambridge
19:45 BST	T.Youngs 58'	Report	J.Forrester 12', 20'	Stadium: Abbey Stadium; Attendance: 5,394; Referee: Neale Barry

28 October 2000 14	Northampton Town	0–1	Rotherham United	Northampton
15:00 BST		Report	G.Branston (red card) 15'; S.Talbot 30'	Stadium: Sixfields Stadium; Attendance: 6,478; Referee: Mark Cooper

4 November 2000 15	Colchester United	0–2	Northampton Town	Colchester
15:00 GMT		Report	J.Forrester 39'; S.Howard 60'	Stadium: Layer Road; Attendance: 3,352; Referee: Mike North

7 November 2000 16	Northampton Town	2–2	Stoke City	Northampton
19:45 GMT	J.Forrester 13'; S.Howard 45'	Report	G.Kavanagh 10'; J.O'Connor 24'	Stadium: Sixfields Stadium; Attendance: 5,475; Referee: Keith Hill

11 November 2000 17	Northampton Town	0–3	AFC Bournemouth	Northampton
15:00 GMT		Report	S.Fletcher 36'; J.Defoe 60', 78'	Stadium: Sixfields Stadium; Attendance: 5,692; Referee: Clive Wilkes

25 November 2000 18	Walsall	3–0	Northampton Town	Walsall
15:00 GMT	J.Leitão 3'; P.Hall 52'; B.Angell 88'	Report		Stadium: Bescot Stadium; Attendance: 5,894; Referee: Graham Laws

2 December 2000 19	Northampton Town	0–1	Swindon Town	Northampton
15:00 GMT		Report	G.Alexander 24'	Stadium: Sixfields Stadium; Attendance: 5,816; Referee: Bill Burns

16 December 2000 20	Oxford United	3–1	Northampton Town	Oxford
15:00 GMT	S.Anthrobus 6'; M.Murphy 36'; C.Hackett 59'	Report	D.Savage 28' (pen.)	Stadium: Manor Ground; Attendance: 4,899; Referee: Tony Leake

23 December 2000 21	Peterborough United	1–2	Northampton Town	Peterborough
15:00 GMT	L.McKenzie 26'	Report	J.Forrester 66'; I.Sampson 83'	Stadium: London Road; Attendance: 9,868; Referee: Peter Jones

26 December 2000 22	Northampton Town	2–0	Bristol City	Northampton
12:00 GMT	D.Savage 29'; J.Forrester 30'	Report		Stadium: Sixfields Stadium; Attendance: 6,064; Referee: Colin Webster

30 December 2000 23	Northampton Town	2–2	Wycombe Wanderers	Northampton
15:00 GMT	J.Forrester 26'; S.Howard 85'	Report	S.Brown 7'; D.Bulman 49'	Stadium: Sixfields Stadium; Attendance: 5,722; Referee: Mark Warren

1 January 2001 24	Reading	1–1	Northampton Town	Reading
15:00 GMT	D.Caskey 90'	Report	M.Gabbiadini 87'	Stadium: Madejski Stadium; Attendance: 10,599; Referee: Tony Leake

6 January 2001 25	Brentford	1–1	Northampton Town	Brentford, London
15:00 GMT	L.Owusu 90'	Report	D.Savage 45' (pen.)	Stadium: Griffin Park; Attendance: 5,361; Referee: Howard Webb

13 January 2001 26	Northampton Town	2–1	Bury	Northampton
15:00 GMT	J.Hodge 2'; M.Gabbiadini 79'	Report	C.Swailes 36'	Stadium: Sixfields Stadium; Attendance: 5,127; Referee: Paul Alcock

20 January 2001 27	Bristol City	2–0	Northampton Town	Bristol
15:00 GMT	S.Clist 54'; M.Bell 73'	Report		Stadium: Ashton Gate; Attendance: 5,361; Referee: Lee Cable

27 January 2001 28	Northampton Town	0–0	Peterborough United	Northampton
12:00 GMT		Report		Stadium: Sixfields Stadium; Attendance: 7,079; Referee: Graham Barber

3 February 2001 29	Stoke City	1–1	Northampton Town	Stoke-on-Trent
15:00 GMT	A.Cooke 59'	Report	S.Howard 74'	Stadium: Britannia Stadium; Attendance: 13,235; Referee: Scott Mathieson

10 February 2001 30	Northampton Town	0–1	Luton Town	Northampton
15:00 GMT		Report	S.Douglas 4'	Stadium: Sixfields Stadium; Attendance: 6,633; Referee: Mick Fletcher

17 February 2001 31	Notts County	2–0	Northampton Town	Nottingham
15:00 GMT	M.Stallard 13'; N.Fenton 77'	Report		Stadium: Meadow Lane; Attendance: 6,320; Referee: Phil Dowd

20 February 2001 32	Northampton Town	3–3	Millwall	Northampton
19:45 GMT	M.Gabbiadini 60'; D.Savage 67' (pen.), 81' (pen.)	Report	P.Moody 13'; N.Harris 54'; C.Kinet 87'	Stadium: Sixfields Stadium; Attendance: 5,026; Referee: Paul Rejer

24 February 2001 33	Northampton Town	1–0	Wigan Athletic	Northampton
15:00 GMT	J.Forrester 45'	Report		Stadium: Sixfields Stadium; Attendance: 5,571; Referee: Roger Furnandiz

27 February 2001 34	Northampton Town	2–1	Swansea City	Northampton
19:45 GMT	I.Sampson 89'; M.Gabbiadini 90'	Report	N.Fabiano 39'	Stadium: Sixfields Stadium; Attendance: 4,361; Referee: Graham Poll

2 March 2001 35	Wrexham	3–0	Northampton Town	Wrexham, Wales
19:30 GMT	B.Carey 14'; A.Morrell 39'; L.Trundle 90'	Report		Stadium: Racecourse Ground; Attendance: 2,940; Referee: Mark Cooper

6 March 2001 36	Northampton Town	2–1	Bristol Rovers	Northampton
19:45 GMT	D.Savage 13' (pen.); J.Hunt 72'	Report	N.Ellington 80'	Stadium: Sixfields Stadium; Attendance: 4,552; Referee: Alan Kaye

10 March 2001 37	Swansea City	1–1	Northampton Town	Swansea, Wales
15:00 GMT	S.Watkin 53'	Report	S.Howard 45'	Stadium: Vetch Field; Attendance: 4,911; Referee: Trevor Parkes

23 March 2001 38	Oldham Athletic	2–1	Northampton Town	Oldham
19:45 GMT	L.Duxbury 48', 70'	Report	J.Frain 15'	Stadium: Boundary Park; Attendance: 4,001; Referee: Trevor Jones

31 March 2001 39	Northampton Town	0–1	Oxford United	Northampton
15:00 BST		Report	P.Tait 12'	Stadium: Sixfields Stadium; Attendance: 6,115; Referee: Steve Lodge

7 April 2001 40	Swindon Town	1–1	Northampton Town	Swindon
15:00 BST	I.Woan 2'	Report	D.Savage 39'	Stadium: County Ground; Attendance: 5,932; Referee: Mike North

13 April 2001 41	Northampton Town	0–2	Cambridge United	Northampton
19:45 BST		Report	I.Ashbee 24'; O.Riza 84'	Stadium: Sixfields Stadium; Attendance: 6,063; Referee: Matt Messias

16 April 2001 42	Rotherham United	1–0	Northampton Town	Rotherham
15:00 BST	M.Robins 45' (pen.)	Report		Stadium: Millmoor; Attendance: 6,714; Referee: Bill Jordan

21 April 2001 43	Northampton Town	2–0	Colchester United	Northampton
15:00 BST	D.Savage 35' (pen.); J.Forrester 61'	Report		Stadium: Sixfields Stadium; Attendance: 5,012; Referee: Andy Hall

26 April 2001 44	Northampton Town	0–2	Port Vale	Northampton
19:45 BST		Report	T.Naylor 13'; S.Brooker 15'	Stadium: Sixfields Stadium; Attendance: 4,775; Referee: David Crick

28 April 2001 45	AFC Bournemouth	2–0	Northampton Town	Bournemouth
15:00 BST	W.Elliott 35'; C.Jorgensen 52'	Report		Stadium: Dean Court; Attendance: 6,511; Referee: Scott Mathieson

5 May 2001 46	Northampton Town	0–3	Walsall	Northampton
15:00 BST		Report	B.Angell 63', 80', 81'	Stadium: Sixfields Stadium; Attendance: 5,389; Referee: Jeff Winter

=== FA Cup ===
18 November 2000 First round	Northampton Town	4–0	Frickley Athletic	Northampton
15:00 GMT	J.Frain 19'; J.Forrester 56', 81'; J.Hunt 83'	Report		Stadium: Sixfields Stadium; Attendance: 3,896; Referee: Mark Clattenburg

9 December 2000 Second round	Rotherham United	1–0	Northampton Town	Rotherham
15:00 GMT	G.Hughes 14' (o.g.)	Report		Stadium: Millmoor; Attendance: 4,964; Referee: Trevor Jones

=== League Cup ===
22 August 2000 First round 1st Leg	Northampton Town	1–0	Fulham	Northampton
19:45 BST	M.Gabbiadini 24'	Report		Stadium: Sixfields Stadium; Attendance: 3,847; Referee: Phil Richards

5 September 2000 First round 2nd Leg	Fulham	4–1	Northampton Town	Fulham, London
19:45 BST	S.Davis 45'; F.Fernandes 56'; L.Saha 71', 90'	Report	I.Sampson 6'	Stadium: Craven Cottage; Attendance: 5,302; Referee: Ray Olivier

=== League Trophy ===
5 December 2000 First round (s)	Millwall	4–1	Northampton Town	Millwall, London
19:45 GMT	C.Kinet 10', 15', 50' (pen.); R.Sadlier 56'	Report	J.Gould 69'	Stadium: The New Den; Attendance: 2,369; Referee: Ray Olivier

=== Appearances, goals and cards ===
No.	Pos	Player	Division Two			FA Cup			League Cup			League Trophy			Total			Discipline	
No.	Pos	Player	Starts	Sub	Goals	Starts	Sub	Goals	Starts	Sub	Goals	Starts	Sub	Goals	Starts	Sub	Goals	Booked	Sent off (straight red)
1	GK	Keith Welch	40	–	–	1	–	–	2	–	–	–	–	–	43	–	–	–	–
2	MF	Jim Whitley	13	–	–	–	–	–	–	–	–	–	–	–	13	–	–	3	–
3	LB	John Frain	27	–	1	1	–	1	1	–	–	–	–	–	29	–	2	3	–
4	CB	Ian Sampson	41	–	2	2	–	–	1	–	1	1	–	–	45	–	3	12	–
5	CB	Lee Howey	2	1	–	–	–	–	–	–	–	–	–	–	2	1	–	–	–
6	LB	Duncan Spedding	17	4	–	1	–	–	1	–	–	1	–	–	20	4	–	6	–
7	RM	Dave Savage	37	6	8	2	–	–	1	–	–	–	1	–	40	7	8	4	–
8	CM	James Hunt	41	–	1	2	–	1	2	–	–	–	–	–	45	–	2	9	–
10	ST	Marco Gabbiadini	34	10	6	1	1	–	2	–	1	1	–	–	38	11	7	8	–
11	CM	Roy Hunter	1	3	–	–	–	–	–	–	–	–	–	–	1	3	–	1	–
14	RM	John Hodge	24	9	1	–	1	–	–	2	–	–	–	–	24	12	1	1	–
15	GK	Adam Sollitt	6	–	–	1	–	–	–	–	–	1	–	–	8	–	–	–	–
16	RB	Garry Hughes	12	4	1	1	1	–	2	–	–	1	–	–	16	5	1	–	–
17	CB	Richard Hope	30	3	–	2	–	–	1	–	–	1	–	–	34	3	–	3	–
18	ST	Jamie Forrester	42	1	17	2	–	2	2	–	–	–	–	–	46	1	19	–	–
19	ST	Andy Morrow	2	2	–	–	–	–	–	–	–	1	–	–	3	2	–	–	–
20	CM	Chris Hargreaves	29	2	–	2	–	–	1	–	–	1	–	–	33	2	–	7	–
21	CB	Richard Green	34	4	–	2	–	–	2	–	–	1	–	–	39	4	–	4	–
22	ST	Kevin Wilson	–	6	–	–	–	–	–	–	–	–	–	–	–	6	–	–	–
23	LM	James Gould	–	1	–	–	–	–	–	–	–	1	–	1	1	1	1	–	–
24	MF	Ryan Thompson	–	2	–	–	–	–	–	–	–	–	–	–	–	2	–	1	–
25	MF	Michael Laws	–	–	–	–	–	–	–	–	–	–	–	–	–	–	–	–	–
26	ST	Ryan Nash	–	–	–	–	–	–	–	–	–	–	–	–	–	–	–	–	–
27	LB	Paul Dempsey	5	1	–	–	–	–	–	–	–	–	–	–	5	1	–	1	–
28	MF	Richie Lopes	3	3	–	–	–	–	–	–	–	–	–	–	3	3	–	–	–
29	ST	Danny Lowe	–	4	–	–	–	–	–	–	–	–	–	–	–	4	–	–	–
30	LM	Chris Carruthers	1	2	–	–	–	–	–	–	–	–	–	–	1	2	–	–	–
32	MF	Neil Champelovier	–	–	–	–	–	–	–	–	–	–	–	–	–	–	–	–	–
Players no longer at the club:
2	RB	Ian Hendon	9	–	1	–	–	–	2	–	–	–	–	–	11	–	1	1	–
2	RB	Mark Maley	2	–	–	–	–	–	–	–	–	–	–	–	2	–	–	1	–
2	RB	Liam Chilvers	7	–	–	–	–	–	–	–	–	–	–	–	7	–	–	–	–
9	ST	Steve Howard	23	10	8	2	–	–	2	–	–	1	–	–	28	10	8	10	–
12	ST	Daryl Clare	3	1	–	–	–	–	–	–	–	–	1	–	3	2	–	–	–
12	DF	Richard Dryden	9	1	–	–	–	–	–	–	–	–	–	–	9	1	–	–	–
12	DF	Lee Canoville	2	–	–	–	–	–	–	–	–	–	–	–	3	–	–	–	–
12	CB	Barry Ferguson	1	2	–	–	–	–	–	–	–	–	–	–	1	2	–	–	–
27	DF	Lee Crooks	3	–	–	–	–	–	–	–	–	–	–	–	3	–	–	–	–
28	LB	Kevin Nicholson	6	1	–	–	–	–	–	–	–	–	1	–	6	1	–	–	–

== Transfers ==
=== Transfers in ===
Date from	Position	Nationality	Name	From	Fee	Ref.
27 June 2000	FW	(England)	Jamie Forrester	FC Utrecht	£150,000	
27 June 2000	FW	(England)	Marco Gabbiadini	Darlington	Free transfer	
27 June 2000	CM	(England)	Chris Hargreaves	Plymouth Argyle	Free transfer	
25 July 2000	GK	(England)	Adam Sollitt	Kettering Town	£30,000	

=== Loans in ===
Date from	Position	Nationality	Name	Loaned from	On loan until	Ref.
29 December 2000	CB	(Republic of Ireland)	Barry Ferguson	(England) Coventry City	29 January 2001	

=== Transfers out ===
Date from	Position	Nationality	Name	To	Fee	Ref.
12 October 2000	RB	(England)	Ian Hendon	(England) Sheffield Wednesday	£55,000	
9 March 2001	LB	(England)	Kevin Nicholson	(England) Notts County	Free transfer	
22 March 2001	FW	(England)	Steve Howard	(England) Luton Town	£50,000	
