= 2002–03 Swindon Town F.C. season =

- Chairman: Willie Carson
- Manager: Andy King
- Ground: County Ground, Swindon
- Division Two: 10th
- FA Cup: 2nd Round
- League Cup: 1st Round
- FL Trophy: 2nd Round (South)
- Top goalscorer: League: Sam Parkin (25); All: Sam Parkin (26)
- Highest home attendance: 8,629 (vs. Bristol City)
- Lowest home attendance: 1,747 (vs. Southend United)
| Home colours | Away colours |

The 2002–03 season was Swindon Town's third season in the Division Two since their relegation from the second tier of English football in 2000. Alongside the league campaign, Swindon Town also competed in the FA Cup, League Cup and the Football League Trophy.

== Nationwide League Division Two ==
| Pos | Team | Pld | W | D | L | GF | GA | GD | Pts |
|---|---|---|---|---|---|---|---|---|---|
| 8 | Plymouth Argyle | 46 | 17 | 14 | 15 | 63 | 52 | +11 | 65 |
| 9 | Luton Town | 46 | 17 | 14 | 15 | 67 | 62 | +5 | 65 |
| 10 | Swindon Town | 46 | 16 | 12 | 18 | 59 | 63 | −4 | 60 |
| 11 | Peterborough United | 46 | 14 | 16 | 16 | 51 | 54 | −3 | 58 |
| 12 | Colchester United | 46 | 14 | 16 | 16 | 52 | 56 | −4 | 58 |

Rules for classification: In the Football League goals scored (GF) takes precedence over goal difference (GD).

== Results and matchday squads ==
=== Division Two line-ups ===
| Date | Opposition | V | Score | 1 | 2 | 3 | 4 | 5 | 6 | 7 | 8 | 9 | 10 | 11 | 12 | 13 | 14 | 15 | 16 |
| 10/08/02 | Barnsley | H | 3–1 | Griemink | Edds | Duke | Willis | Heywood | Hewlett | Robinson | Miglioranzi | Parkin | Invincibile_{1} | Sabin | Davis_{1} | Reeves | Edwards | Young | Farr |
| 13/08/02 | Chesterfield | A | 4–2 | Griemink | Edds | Duke | Willis | Heywood | Hewlett_{1} | Robinson | Miglioranzi | Parkin | Invincibile | Sabin | Davis_{1} | Reeves | Edwards | Young | Farr |
| 17/08/02 | Blackpool | A | 0–0 | Griemink | Edds | Duke | Willis | Heywood | Robinson | Davis | Miglioranzi | Parkin | Invincibile_{1} | Sabin_{2} | Edwards_{1} | Young_{2} | Dykes | Reeves | Farr |
| 24/08/02 | Cardiff City | H | 0–1 | Griemink | Edds | Duke | Willis | Heywood | Gurney | Davis | Miglioranzi | Sabin | Invincibile_{2} | Robinson_{1} | Parkin_{1} | Young_{2} | Reeves | Edwards | Farr |
| 26/08/02 | Brentford | A | 1–3 | Griemink | Edds | Duke | Willis | Heywood | Gurney | Davis | Miglioranzi | Parkin | Sabin | Robinson_{1} | Invincibile_{1} | Dykes | Reeves | Edwards | Farr |
| 31/08/02 | Stockport County | H | 0–1 | Griemink | Edds | Duke | Reeves | Heywood | Gurney | Davis | Miglioranzi | Parkin | Sabin | Robinson_{1} | Willis_{1} | Cobian | Edwards | Young | Farr |
| 07/09/02 | Port Vale | H | 1–2 | Griemink | Edds_{2} | Duke | Reeves_{1} | Heywood | Gurney | Davis | Miglioranzi | Parkin | Sabin | Robinson | Willis_{1} | Young_{2} | Hewlett | Dykes | Farr |
| 14/09/02 | QPR | A | 0–2 | Griemink | Gurney | Duke_{1} | Reeves | Heywood | Hewlett_{2} | Robinson | Miglioranzi | Parkin | Sabin | Jackson | Edds_{1} | Young_{2} | Cobian | Edwards | Farr |
| 17/09/02 | Cheltenham Town | A | 0–2 | Griemink | Gurney | Duke | Edds | Heywood | Hewlett | Robinson | Sabin | Parkin | Invincibile | Jackson | Miglioranzi | Dykes | Edwards | Young | Farr |
| 21/09/02 | Northampton Town | H | 2–0 | Griemink | Gurney | Duke | Willis | Heywood | Hewlett | Robinson_{1} | Sabin | Parkin | Invincibile | Jackson | Miglioranzi_{1} | Edds | Reeves | Young | Farr |
| 28/09/02 | Luton Town | A | 0–3 | Griemink | Gurney | Duke | Willis | Heywood | Hewlett | Robinson_{1} | Sabin | Parkin | Invincible_{2} | Jackson | Edds_{1} | Young_{2} | Reeves | Edwards | Farr |
| 05/10/02 | Oldham Athletic | H | 0–1 | Griemink | Gurney | Duke | Reeves | Heywood | Hewlett | Willis | Miglioranzi_{1} | Sabin | Invincibile | Jackson | Edds_{1} | Cobian | Dykes | Bampton | Farr |
| 12/10/02 | Colchester United | H | 2–2 | Griemink | Gurney | Duke | Reeves | Heywood | Hewlett | Davis | Robinson | Sabin | Invincibile | Jackson | Edds | Miglioranzi | Dykes | Young | Farr |
| 19/10/02 | Bristol City | A | 0–2 | Griemink | Gurney | Duke | Reeves | Heywood | Hewlett | Davis | Miglioranzi_{2} | Sabin | Invincibile | Robinson | Young_{1} | Jackson_{2} | Edds | Willis | Farr |
| 26/10/02 | Mansfield Town | H | 2–1 | Griemink | Gurney | Duke | Reeves | Gurney | Hewlett | Davis_{1} | Miglioranzi_{2} | Parkin | Sabin | Jackson | Invincibile_{1} | Robinson_{2} | Edds | Willis | Farr |
| 29/10/02 | Notts County | A | 1–1 | Griemink | Gurney | Duke | Reeves | Heywood | Hewlett | Robinson | Sabin | Parkin | Invincibile_{1} | Jackson_{2} | Davis_{1} | Miglioranzi_{2} | Edds | Willis | Farr |
| 02/11/02 | Wycombe Wanderers | A | 3–2 | Griemink | Gurney | Duke | Reeves | Heywood | Hewlett | Davis | Robinson | Parkin | Sabin_{1} | Jackson | Invincibile_{1} | Edds | Willis | Miglioranzi | Farr |
| 09/11/02 | Tranmere Rovers | H | 1–1 | Griemink | Gurney | Duke | Reeves | Heywood | Hewlett | Davis | Robinson | Parkin | Invincibile_{1} | Jackson | Young_{1} | Edds | Willis | Miglioranzi | Farr |
| 23/11/02 | Huddersfield Town | A | 3–2 | Griemink | Gurney | Duke_{2} | Reeves | Heywood | Hewlett | Robinson | Miglioranzi | Sabin_{1} | Invincibile | Jackson | Parkin_{1} | Edds_{2} | Willis | Young | Farr |
| 30/11/02 | Peterborough United | H | 1–1 | Griemink | Gurney | Duke | Reeves | Heywood | Hewlett_{1} | Sabin | Miglioranzi | Parkin | Invincibile | Jackson | Robinson_{1} | Edds | Willis | Young | Farr |
| 14/12/02 | Plymouth Argyle | A | 1–1 | Griemink | Gurney | Duke | Reeves | Heywood | Hewlett | Robinson_{1} | Miglioranzi | Parkin | Invincibile | Sabin | Bampton_{1} | Edds | Willis | Young | Farr |
| 21/12/02 | Crewe Alexandra | H | 1–3 | Griemink | Gurney | Duke | Reeves | Heywood | Hewlett | Robinson | Miglioranzi | Parkin | Invincibile | Sabin_{1} | Sutton_{1} | Edds | Willis | Bampton | Farr |
| 26/12/02 | Brentford | H | 2–1 | Griemink | Gurney | Duke | Reeves | Heywood | Hewlett | Robinson | Miglioranzi | Parkin | Invincibile | Nightingale_{1} | Sabin_{1} | Edds | Marney | Willis | Judge |
| 28/12/02 | Wigan Athletic | A | 0–2 | Griemink | Gurney | Marney | Reeves | Heywood | Hewlett | Robinson_{2} | Miglioranzi | Parkin | Invincibile | Nightingale_{1} | Sabin_{1} | Willis_{2} | Edds | Halliday | Judge |
| 01/01/03 | Cardiff City | A | 1–1 | Griemink | Gurney | Marney | Reeves | Heywood | Hewlett | Robinson_{2} | Miglioranzi | Parkin | Invincibile_{1} | Duke | Sabin_{1} | Willis_{2} | Edds | Nightingale | Smith |
| 04/01/03 | Chesterfield | H | 3–0 | Griemink | Gurney | Marney | Reeves | Heywood | Hewlett | Robinson_{1} | Miglioranzi_{2} | Parkin | Invincibile | Duke | Willis_{1} | Sabin_{2} | Edds | Nightingale | Smith |
| 18/01/03 | Stockport County | A | 5–2 | Griemink | Gurney | Marney | Reeves | Heywood | Hewlett | Robinson | Miglioranzi | Parkin_{2} | Invincibile_{1} | Duke | Sabin_{1} | Nightingale_{2} | Edds | Willis | Farr |
| 22/01/03 | Blackpool | H | 1–1 | Griemink | Gurney | Marney_{2} | Reeves | Heywood | Hewlett | Robinson | Miglioranzi | Parkin | Invincibile_{1} | Duke | Sabin_{1} | Edds_{2} | Willis | Nightingale | Farr |
| 25/01/03 | Wigan Athletic | H | 2–1 | Griemink | Gurney | Marney_{1} | Reeves | Heywood | Hewlett | Robinson | Miglioranzi | Parkin | Invincibile | Duke | Willis_{1} | Edds | Sabin | Young | Farr |
| 01/02/03 | Barnsley | A | 1–1 | Griemink | Gurney | Willis_{1} | Reeves | Heywood | Hewlett | Robinson | Miglioranzi | Parkin | Invincibile | Duke | Ifil_{1} | Sabin | Young | Taylor | Farr |
| 08/02/03 | Tranmere Rovers | A | 1–0 | Griemink | Gurney | Marney | Reeves | Heywood | Hewlett | Robinson | Miglioranzi | Parkin | Invincibile_{2} | Duke_{1} | Ifil_{1} | Sabin_{2} | Edds | Taylor | Farr |
| 15/02/03 | Wycombe Wanderers | H | 0–3 | Griemink | Gurney | Marney_{2} | Reeves | Heywood | Hewlett_{1} | Robinson | Miglioranzi | Parkin | Invincibile | Duke | Ifil_{1} | Sabin_{2} | Dykes | Edwards | Farr |
| 22/02/03 | Port Vale | A | 1–1 | Griemink | Gurney | Ifil_{1} | Reeves | Heywood | Hewlett | Robinson | Miglioranzi | Parkin | Invincibile_{2} | Duke | Marney_{1} | Sabin_{2} | Beswetherick | Young | Farr |
| 01/03/03 | QPR | H | 3–1 | Griemink | Gurney | Duke | Reeves | Heywood | Hewlett | Robinson | Miglioranzi | Parkin | Sabin | Beswetherick_{1} | Ifil | Dykes | Edwards | Young | Farr |
| 08/03/03 | Northampton Town | A | 0–1 | Griemink | Gurney | Duke | Reeves | Heywood | Hewlett | Robinson | Miglioranzi | Parkin | Sabin | Beswetherick_{1} | Invincibile_{1} | Ifil | Dykes | Taylor | Farr |
| 12/03/03 | Cheltenham Town | H | 0–3 | Griemink | Gurney | Duke | Reeves | Heywood | Hewlett | Robinson | Miglioranzi | Parkin | Invincibile | Beswetherick | Sabin_{1} | Ifil | Dykes | Taylor | Farr |
| 15/03/03 | Mansfield Town | A | 1–2 | Griemink | Gurney | Duke | Reeves | Heywood | Hewlett | Robinson | Miglioranzi_{1} | Parkin | Invincibile | Ifil | Sabin_{1} | Beswetherick | Dykes | Taylor | Farr |
| 19/03/03 | Bristol City | H | 1–1 | Griemink | Gurney | Duke | Reeves | Heywood | Ifil | Robinson | Miglioranzi | Parkin | Invincibile | Lewis | Hewlett | Dykes | Young | Taylor | Farr |
| 22/03/03 | Notts County | H | 5–0 | Griemink | Gurney | Duke | Reeves | Heywood | Ifil | Robinson_{3} | Miglioranzi | Parkin | Invincibile_{2} | Lewis_{1} | Hewlett_{1} | Sabin_{2} | Young_{3} | Edwards | Farr |
| 29/03/03 | Colchester United | A | 0–1 | Griemink | Gurney | Duke | Ifil_{3} | Heywood | Hewlett | Lewis | Miglioranzi | Parkin | Invincibile_{1} | Sabin_{2} | Dykes_{1} | Young_{2} | Reeves_{3} | Robinson | Farr |
| 05/04/03 | Peterborough United | A | 1–1 | Griemink | Gurney | Duke_{1} | Reeves | Heywood | Hewlett | Robinson | Miglioranzi | Parkin | Sabin | Lewis_{2} | Invincibile_{1} | Edwards_{2} | Dykes | Young | Farr |
| 12/04/03 | Huddersfield Town | H | 0–1 | Griemink | Gurney | Dykes_{1} | Lewis | Heywood | Hewlett | Robinson | Miglioranzi_{3} | Parkin | Invincibile | Sabin_{2} | Edds_{1} | Edwards_{2} | Young | Herring | Smith |
| 19/04/03 | Crewe Alexandra | A | 1–0 | Griemink | Herring | Duke_{1} | Reeves | Heywood | Hewlett | Robinson | Miglioranzi | Parkin | Invincibile | Lewis | Taylor_{1} | Draycott | Halliday | Young | Farr |
| 23/04/03 | Plymouth Argyle | H | 2–0 | Farr | Herring_{1} | Duke | Reeves | Heywood | Hewlett | Robinson | Miglioranzi_{2} | Parkin | Invincibile_{3} | Lewis | Bampton_{1} | Taylor_{2} | Young_{3} | Draycott | Griemink |
| 26/04/03 | Oldham Athletic | A | 0–4 | Farr | Gurney_{3} | Duke | Reeves | Heywood | Hewlett | Robinson_{1} | Miglioranzi_{2} | Parkin | Invincibile | Lewis | Herring_{1} | Taylor_{2} | Garrard_{3} | Draycott | Griemink |
| 03/05/03 | Luton Town | H | 2–1 | Griemink | Gurney | Duke | Lewis | Heywood | Hewlett | Robinson | Miglioranzi_{3} | Parkin | Invincibile_{2} | Sabin_{1} | Herring_{1} | Bampton_{2} | Taylor_{3} | Garrard | Farr |

_{1} 1st Substitution, _{2} 2nd Substitution, _{3} 3rd Substitution.

=== FA Cup line-ups ===
| Date | Opposition | V | Score | 1 | 2 | 3 | 4 | 5 | 6 | 7 | 8 | 9 | 10 | 11 | 12 | 13 | 14 | 15 | 16 |
| 16/11/02 | Huddersfield Town | H | 1–0 | Griemink | Gurney | Duke | Reeves | Heywood | Hewlett | Robinson | Sabin | Parkin | Invincibile | Jackson | Edds | Willie | Miglioranzi | Young | Farr |
| 11/09/02 | Oxford United | A | 0–1 | Griemink | Edds_{1} | Duke | Reeves | Heywood | Hewlett | Miglioranzi | Sabin_{3} | Parkin | Invincibile | Jackson_{2} | Willis_{1} | Bampton_{2} | Young_{3} | Halliday | Farr |

_{1} 1st Substitution, _{2} 2nd Substitution, _{3} 3rd Substitution.

=== League Cup line-ups ===
| Date | Opposition | V | Score | 1 | 2 | 3 | 4 | 5 | 6 | 7 | 8 | 9 | 10 | 11 | 12 | 13 | 14 | 15 | 16 |
| 11/09/02 | Wycombe Wanderers | A | 1–2 | Griemink | Gurney | Duke | Willis_{3} | Heywood | Hewlett | Davis_{1} | Miglioranzi_{2} | Parkin | Sabin | Robinson | Dykes_{1} | Edds_{2} | Reeves_{3} | Young | Farr |

_{1} 1st Substitution, _{2} 2nd Substitution, _{3} 3rd Substitution.

=== Football League Trophy line-ups ===
| Date | Opposition | V | Score | 1 | 2 | 3 | 4 | 5 | 6 | 7 | 8 | 9 | 10 | 11 | 12 | 13 | 14 | 15 | 16 |
| 22/10/02 | Southend United | H | 6–1 | Griemink_{3} | Gurney | Duke | Edds | Heywood | Willis | Davis_{2} | Miglioranzi | Parkin | Invincibile_{1} | Jackson | Sabin_{1} | Dykes_{2} | Hewlett | Reeves | Farr_{3} |
| 15/11/02 | Kidderminster Harriers | H | 2–3 | Farr | Edds_{3} | Willis | Reeves | Heywood | Robinson | Dykes_{2} | Miglioranzi | Young | Invincibile | Jackson_{1} | Duke_{1} | Parkin_{2} | Gurney_{3} | Hewlett | Griemink |

_{1} 1st Substitution, _{2} 2nd Substitution, _{3} 3rd Substitution.
