= Hinckley United F.C. =

English football club, 1997–2013

Hinckley United
- Full name: Hinckley United Football Club
- Nickname: The Knitters
- Founded: 1997; 29 years ago (Merger of Athletic and Town)
- Dissolved: 2013; 13 years ago
- Ground: De Montfort Park
- Capacity: 4,329 (630 seated)
- 2012–13: Conference North, 22nd (relegated)
Home colours	Away colours

Hinckley United Football Club was an English football club, from Hinckley, Leicestershire, which last played in the Southern Football League Premier Division during the 2013–14 season. They were formed in 1997 as the result of a merger between Hinckley Athletic and Hinckley Town. The club latterly played their home games at De Montfort Park, having moved to the purpose-built football stadium in March 2005.

On 7 October 2013 Hinckley United were wound up in the High Court.

After the club was dissolved, two clubs were formed to replace them; Hinckley AFC and Leicester Road.

== History ==
The town of Hinckley had an established football team for over one hundred years. The earliest recorded team was Hinckley Town, formed in 1889 and competed in the Leicestershire Senior League, playing their games at the Holywell Ground, behind the Holywell Inn pub. A short spell in the Midland League in 1900 was followed by a name change to Hinckley United and a return to the Leicestershire Senior League in 1905, where the club remained until the outbreak of the First World War. After the war Hinckley United competed in the Birmingham Combination, becoming champions twice in 1923–24 and 1926–27.

After the war, the brewery owners of the Holywell Ground decided they wanted the land for other uses and the football club found themselves without a ground. The club managed to purchase land on Middlefield Lane, for the sum of £500, in August 1946, and following a name change to Hinckley Athletic in September 1946, the club resumed playing in the Nuneaton Combination league.

Hinckley Athletic subsequently competed in the Birmingham Combination again, the Southern League and West Midlands League before becoming founder members of the Midland Alliance. At the height of their success manager Dudley Kernick took the club into the Southern League Premier Division in 1964, before a financial crisis led to a relegation and eventual resignation from the Southern League. The club struggled to survive in the West Midlands League for the next 25 years. The early 1990s saw a turn around in fortunes for Hinckley Athletic and manager John Hanna saw the club become founder members of the Midland Alliance.

Meanwhile, in 1958 Westfield Wanderers were formed and played in the Hinckley District League. In 1972 they changed their name to Hinckley Town and joined the Leicestershire Senior League, before their successful period in the 1980s with a switch to the Central Midlands League, then the West Midlands (Regional) League and gaining promotion to the Southern League in 1990.

Hinckley United, was formed on Wednesday 18 June 1997. A meeting on that date saw shareholders of Hinckley Athletic approve a merger with neighbours Hinckley Town. Merger moves were made immediately at the end of the 1996–97 season when Athletic narrowly missed out on promotion to the Southern League for the third consecutive campaign following finishes of 2nd, 3rd and 2nd again. A meeting of the respective chairmen, Mick Voce (Athletic) and Kevin Downes (Town), established there was some common ground with each club having something positive to offer, and the merger was completed.

Consequently, the new club were to play at Middlefield Lane with Town's Leicester Road set up being used as a training ground, and once the FA and Southern League had approved the merger, United inherited Town's Southern League Midland Division place.

The aim was to provide better quality football in Hinckley and this success was achieved within four years. After a mid table finish in their first season, Hinckley United improved with finishes of fourth, third and then won the Southern League Midland/West Division in season 2000–01. That season saw Hinckley score 102 league goals and extend an unbeaten home record to 51 games.

This success was further compounded by becoming founder member of the Conference North. The first two seasons in the Southern League Premier Division Hinckley had mid-table finishes, but the following season finished in sixth place, also meaning they finished in a position to be accepted into the newly established Conference North division for 2004–05.

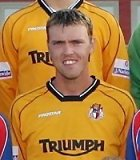
Matt Gadsby

After two mid table finishes consolidating in Conference North, season 2006–07 was accepted as the season Hinckley would make a serious challenge for the title. However, after a good start tragedy struck the club when defender Matt Gadsby collapsed and died on the pitch at Harrogate on 9 September 2006. The practical response in the days following Gadsby's death included fans voluntarily organising bucket collections at games across the country to donate to Gadsby's widow and daughter. These events culminated in a memorial match at the Marston Stadium featuring a Legends XI and a Gadsby Select XI, featuring players from Gadsby's previous clubs. Hinckley players took a month away from football and spent the rest of the season playing catch up. When Hinckley returned to action the season was one of up and down, but held on to a play-off spot, eventually rallying on and off the field to secure fourth place in the league, reaching the play-off final, but missing out on promotion conceding a last minute penalty.

Off the pitch things gathered pace with the development of the club. Middlefield Lane was sold for £4 million which funded De Montfort Park, a purpose-built 4329-capacity football ground. The move away from Middlefield Lane happened on 5 March 2005 when the first game at the new De Montfort Park Stadium was played. Attendances increased at the new stadium and a home league attendance record was set for Hinckley when nearly 2900 watched Hinckley draw with Nuneaton on boxing day 2006.

Following from the play-off final defeat, Hinckley United struggled the following season and were involved in a relegation battle throughout. Despite being bottom of the league at Christmas, relegation was avoided by a nine-game unbeaten run at the end of the season, ensuring survival in the penultimate game.

The next few season were treated as consolidation, as financial hardship hit the club off the field. Lack of proper budgeting the previous seasons meant the club were unable to meet debts, and the HMRC petitioned the courts for a winding up order. The football club was also sanctioned with a registration embargo, limiting the number of players at the club to a maximum of 16. Over two years were spent with the club trying to finance and settle the debts, gaining adjournments from the courts, and the debt was finally settled in November 2010.

Players left the club, due to the financial issues, and season 2010–11 saw a virtual fresh team of players start for Hinckley. Again it was a battle against relegation, but after the registration embargo was lifted in November 2010, some new players were brought in and Hinckley dragged themselves away from the relegation zone towards a mid table finish.

Another season of struggle and financial hardship followed in season 2011–12 and the club were relegated on the final day of the season, though finished on 48 points, the highest points total to be relegated from the Conference North. On 25 May 2012, the F.A published their proposed club allocations for the 2012–13 non-league season proposing Hinckley United would be in the Conference North after both Darlington and Kettering Town were relegated further divisions after financial problems. In June this reprieve was officially confirmed at the Football Conference AGM.

On 10 October the only manager in the club's history, Dean Thomas, resigned following a poor start to the season and increasing financial restrictions and was replaced by assistant manager, Carl Heggs. The club were again playing under a transfer embargo, even having to postpone one home game due to lack of players, and in other matches playing Youth team players. The team went on a winless run and, following a 4–1 defeat at Gloucester City, they were relegated. Heggs resigned, and long-serving player and 1st team coach Stuart Storer became the new manager.

On 7 October 2013 Hinckley United were wound up in the High Court of Justice.

== Successor clubs ==
After the club was dissolved, supporters of Hinckley United formed two clubs: Hinckley A.F.C. and Hinckley Leicester Road F.C. AFC was registered as a Community Trust football club. and accepted into the Midland Football League First Division for the 2014–15 season. Leicester Road were accepted into Division Two of the newly formed Midland League for the 2014–15 season.

Following their formation, both Hinckley AFC and Leicester Road attempted to secure the right to use Leicester Road Stadium. Leicester Road were ultimately successful in purchasing the stadium, with Hinckley AFC having to groundshare at Heather St John's.

The two played each other for the first time in November 2015.

Disputes over the legacy of the original United club and the stadium have led to numerous incidents and disagreements between the two clubs.

== Managers ==
In August 1997 Dean Thomas became team manager with former Hinckley Athletic boss John Hanna being appointed general manager, although Hanna relinquished his position in the new year of 1998, leaving Thomas in sole charge. He won the Southern League Western Division championship with Hinckley United in season 2000–01, and guided the club to the FA Cup 2nd round in December 2001 and December 2004. His assistant manager during that time was former Notts County player Charlie Palmer, however at the start of the 2007–08 season Palmer was replaced by Nick Platnauer. Platnauer had previously managed Rothwell Town, Kettering Town and Bedford Town.

For the 2010–11 season Platnauer, took more of a coaching role, whilst first team coach Stuart Storer took over the role of assistant manager. In July 2011 Platnauer started the season again in the assistant manager's role, but left the club in August 2011, and was replaced by Mark Faulkner. In June 2012 Marc Faulkner was replaced as assistant manager by former Hinckley United striker Carl Heggs.

Following a very poor start to the 2012–13 season, and after an early exit in the FA Cup, Thomas resigned as manager on 10 October 2012. Thomas had been Hinckley United's manager for 16 years and was granted a testimonial season in 2007–08. Assistant manager Carl Heggs was placed in temporary charge and said on several occasions he would love the job on a permanent basis. On 15 November Heggs was offered the job on a permanent basis until the end of the 2012–13 season in a board meeting, but on a further reduced budget after the discovery of more debt being placed upon the club. On 28 February 2013, it was announced in the Hinckley Times that Heggs had signed a new contract until the end of the 2013–2014 season after being given the assurances he was looking for from the board. However, on 21 May 2013, Carl decided to resign as manager after being offered the chance to become a PE teacher at Ascot College, Derbyshire. The job was offered to long-serving first team coach, Stuart Storer, who accepted the offer on 27 May. Storer's first move as boss was to appoint former Knitters' defender Andrew Penny as his assistant. Penny had worked as reserve team manager at Chasetown since 2011.

Dates	Name	Notes
1997–1998	(England) Dean Thomas & John Hanna	-
1998–2012	(England) Dean Thomas	Southern League Midlands/West Division Championship winner 2001, guided Hinckley to the F.A Cup second round in 2001 & 2004. Longest-serving manager in the club's history.
2012–2013	(England) Carl Heggs	Oversaw Hinckey United's first relegation under difficult financial circumstances.
2013	(England) Stuart Storer	-

== Colours, crest and nickname ==
The club colours are red and blue, a blend of the main colours of the former clubs. Athletic played in red and Town played in blue. The original playing kit was red and blue stripes, blue shorts, blue socks – but that has evolved over the past 10 years. Now the playing kit is a solid blue body with red sleeves, and red flashes down the side of the body, blue shorts and red socks.

The original club crest for Hinckley United was the Arms of Honour of Hinckley, basically a red and white halved shield divided in half by a serrated line. The club crest was relaunched in 2004 still incorporating the Arms of Honour of Hinckley but also taking elements of the Borough of Hinckley and Bosworth crest and mascots of the two merged clubs Hinckley Athletic and Hinckley Town. The rams were added from the Borough crest signifying the hosiery industry in the town, and Hinckley Town's eagle plus Hinckley Athletic's robin were placed atop the crest.

At the formation of the club, a competition was held for fans to come up with a nickname and The Knitters was chosen. This reflects one of the longest standing industries associated with the town, the wool and hosiery trade, having been factories in Hinckley since the 17th century.

== Stadium ==
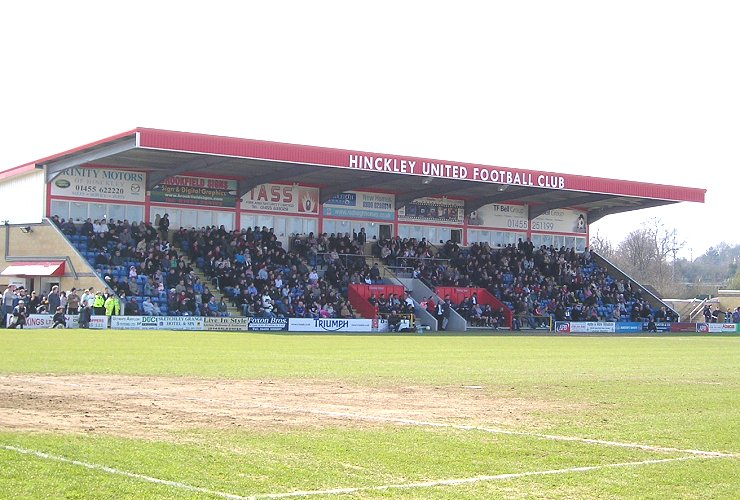
The Main Stand.

Hinckley United began playing their games in 1997 at Middlefield Lane, former home to Hinckley Athletic. Although having the required grade for Southern League and Conference North, it was old and would take a lot of work to upgrade to a better level. Hinckley United spent two years financing, securing land and building a new ground, and in 2005 phase 1 of the stadium was completed. Phase 2 was finished by 2007 adding a full size all weather floodlit pitch and junior changing facilities to the complex.

Marston's Brewery signed a 10-year sponsorship of the ground and it became known as the Marston's Stadium. However, the deal ended early in December 2008 and the name reverted to the original De Montfort Park Stadium.

In January 2009 the club announced a deal for the stadium to be sponsored by the Greene King Brewery and the stadium was renamed the Greene King Stadium.

In total the complex covers 22 acres (8.9 ha) and includes 3 full-size pitches, 2 three-quarter-size pitches, 3 half-size pitches and an all-weather floodlit pitch. The flagship of the complex is the De Montfort Park Stadium, a 4329-capacity purpose-built football ground, also comprising gymnasium, sports injury clinic and a social club too.

The first match in the stadium was on 5 March 2005 when Stalybridge Celtic were the first team to play Hinckley United on the ground, and drew 1–1, in front of a crowd of over 2000.

The FA gave the stadium international recognition in July 2012 when it was selected for two international under-17 matches, alongside Burton's Pirelli Stadium and Northampton's Sixfields Stadium, as part of a friendly tournament involving England, Italy, Turkey and Portugal. The stadium hosted the Portugal U17s 1–0 Italy U17s, and Italy U17s 3–1 Turkey U17s matches.

After the end of the 2012–13 season, Hinckley chairman Mike Sutton confirmed that Greene King Brewery had decided not to renew their deal to sponsor De Montfort Park.

== Performance ==
=== League position ===
- 1997–98 Southern League Division One Midlands 12th position
- 1998–99 Southern League Division One Midlands 4th position
- 1999–2000 Southern League Division One Midlands 3rd position
- 2000–01 Southern League Division One Midlands Champions
- 2001–02 Southern Football League Premier Division 12th position
- 2002–03 Southern Football League Premier Division 13th position
- 2003–04 Southern Football League Premier Division 6th position, qualifying for Conference North
- 2004–05 Conference North 12th position
- 2005–06 Conference North 10th position
- 2006–07 Conference North 4th position, losing play-off finalists
- 2007–08 Conference North 19th position
- 2008–09 Conference North 10th position
- 2009–10 Conference North 7th position
- 2010–11 Conference North 15th position
- 2011–12 Conference North 20th position, saved from relegation by reprieve
- 2012–13 Conference North 22nd position, relegated for the first time in the club's history

=== FA competitions ===
==== FA Cup ====
Hinckley United reached beyond the 1st round of the FA Cup on four occasions, both times losing to Football League opposition in the second round.

In 2001–02 Hinckley United beat Grays Athletic 1–2 at the New Recreation Ground in the First Round, then lost to Cheltenham Town 0–2 at Middlefield Lane.

In 2004–05 Hinckley United recorded one of their most famous victories by beating Torquay United 2–0 at Middlefield Lane. In the Second Round Brentford played at Middlefield Lane live on BBC TV as the match was scheduled to be shown on Match of the Day. The game finished 0–0 with Tommy Whittle, the then Hinckley goalkeeper facing a penalty that John Salako put wide of the post. The replay took place at Griffin Park and Brentford won 2–1, after Hinckley United defender Brad Piercewright was sent off for 'handling the ball on the line'.

in 2009-10 Hinckley lost 3–1 away at Rushden & Diamonds

in 2011-12 Hinckley lost 1–0 away to Tamworth in a replay after a 2–2 draw

==== FA Trophy ====
In the short history of Hinckley United the furthest progression has been to the 4th round. Yeovil Town beat Hinckley United 3–2 at Huish Park in 1998–99.

During the 2011–2012 season Hinckley had another successful cup run, beating Wrexham away in the 1st round, who at the time were top of the Conference National, and eventually bowing out after taking Luton Town to a replay in the 2nd round. Striker Andre Gray impressed in both games against Luton, later leading to the Conference Premier side to signing him on loan with a view to a £30,000 permanent transfer.

== Rivals ==
Local rivals include Nuneaton Town, Shepshed Dynamo, Barwell and Bedworth United. Nuneaton Town and Barwell being the biggest rivals.

== Honours ==
- Southern League Western Division Champions 2000–01
- Southern League Merit Cup Winners 2000–01 (Joint-winners)
- Leicestershire Challenge Cup Winners 2006–07, 2003–04, 2001–02, 2000–01
