= 2004–05 Swindon Town F.C. season =

- Chairman: Willie Carson
- Manager: Andy King
- Ground: County Ground, Swindon
- League One: 12th
- FA Cup: 2nd round
- League Cup: 2nd round
- FL Trophy: Semi-final (South)
- Top goalscorer: League: Sam Parkin (23); All: Sam Parkin (24)
- Highest home attendance: 8,275 (vs. Bournemouth)
- Lowest home attendance: 4,484 (vs. Tranmere Rovers)
Home colours	Away colours	Third colours

The 2004–05 season was Swindon Town's fifth consecutive season in the third tier of English football, now named League One, following their relegation from the second tier of English football in 2000. Alongside the league campaign, Swindon Town also competed in the FA Cup, League Cup and the Football League Trophy.

== League One ==
Pos	Team	Pld	W	D	L	GF	GA	GD	Pts
10	Doncaster Rovers	46	16	18	12	65	60	+5	66
11	Bradford City	46	17	14	15	64	62	+2	65
12	Swindon Town	46	17	12	17	66	68	−2	63
13	Barnsley	46	14	19	13	69	64	+5	61
14	Walsall	46	16	12	18	65	69	−4	60

Updated to match(es) played on May 2005. Source:
Rules for classification: 1) points; 2) goal difference; 3) number of goals scored.

== Matchday squads ==
=== League One line-ups ===
Date	Opposition	V	Score	1	2	3	4	5	6	7	8	9	10	11	12	13	14	15	16
07/08/04	Wrexham	A	1–2	Evans	O'Hanlon	Duke_{1}	Smith	Gurney	Hewlett	Igoe	Miglioranzi	Parkin	Fallon_{2}	Howard	Reeves_{1}	Robinson_{2}	Caton_{3}	Garrard	Book
11/08/04	Luton Town	H	2–3	Evans	O'Hanlon	Duke	Reeves	Gurney	Hewlett	Igoe	Miglioranzi	Parkin	Fallon_{1}	Howard	Caton_{1}	Smith	Robinson	Garrard	Book
14/08/04	Milton Keynes Dons	H	2–1	Evans	O'Hanlon	Duke	Ifil	Gurney	Hewlett	Igoe	Miglioranzi	Parkin	Robinson_{1}	Howard_{2}	Fallon_{1}	Smith_{2}	Opara	Reeves	Book
21/08/04	Bristol City	A	2–1	Evans	O'Hanlon	Duke	Ifil	Gurney	Hewlett	Igoe	Miglioranzi_{3}	Parkin	Henderson_{1}	Howard_{2}	Fallon_{1}	Nicholas_{2}	Robinson_{3}	Reeves	Book
28/08/04	Hartlepool United	H	3–0	Evans	O'Hanlon	Nicholas	Ifil	Gurney_{1}	Hewlett	Yeates_{2}	Howard	Parkin	Henderson_{3}	Duke	Smith_{1}	Robinson_{2}	Fallon_{3}	Reeves	Book
30/08/04	Walsall	A	2–3	Evans	O'Hanlon	Nicholas	Ifil	Gurney	Hewlett	Yeates_{1}	Howard_{2}	Parkin	Henderson	Duke	Smith_{1}	Robinson_{2}	Fallon_{3}	Reeves	Book
04/09/04	Colchester United	A	1–0												_{1}	_{2}	_{3}		

_{1} 1st Substitution, _{2} 2nd Substitution, _{3} 3rd Substitution.

=== FA Cup line-ups ===
Date	Opposition	V	Score	1	2	3	4	5	6	7	8	9	10	11	12	13	14	15	16
13/11/04	Sheffield Wednesday	H	4–1	Evans	O'Hanlon	Duke	Ifil	Heywood	Jenkins	Igoe	Hewlett	Parkin	Roberts_{1}	Howard	Fallon_{1}	Smith	Nicholas	Reeves	Book
04/12/04	Notts County	H	1–1	Evans	O'Hanlon	Duke	Ifil	Heywood	Jenkins	Igoe_{1}	Robinson	Parkin	Fallon_{2}	Howard	Garrard_{1}	Smith_{2}	Nicholas	Reeves	Book
15/12/04	Notts County	A	0–2	Evans	O'Hanlon	Duke_{2}	Reeves_{1}	Heywood	Garrard	Igoe	Hewlett	Parkin	Roberts_{3}	Howard	Fallon_{1}	Smith_{2}	Robinson_{3}	Nicholas	Book

_{1} 1st Substitution, _{2} 2nd Substitution, _{3} 3rd Substitution.

=== League Cup line-ups ===
Date	Opposition	V	Score	1	2	3	4	5	6	7	8	9	10	11	12	13	14	15	16
24/08/04	Rushden & Diamonds	A	1–0	Book	Garrard_{2}	Nicholas	Ifil	Reeves	Hewlett	Smith_{3}	Robinson	Opara_{1}	Fallon	Howard	Parkin_{1}	O'Hanlon_{2}	Igoe_{3}	Pook	Evans
21/09/14	Leeds United	A	0–1	Evans	Smith_{2}	Duke	Ifil	O'Hanlon	Hewlett_{1}	Igoe	Miglioranzi_{3}	Parkin	Robinson	Howard	Fallon_{1}	Heywood_{2}	Pook_{3}	Garrard	Book

_{1} 1st Substitution, _{2} 2nd Substitution, _{3} 3rd Substitution.

=== Football League Trophy line-ups ===
Date	Opposition	V	Score	1	2	3	4	5	6	7	8	9	10	11	12	13	14	15	16
02/11/2004	Exeter	A	2–1	Book	Garrard	Nicholas	Ifil	Heywood	Reeves	Hewlett	Pook_{2}	Caton_{1}	Fallon	Smith	Parkin_{1}	Igoe_{2}	O'Hanlon	Duke	Bulman
30/11/2004	Bristol City	H	1–0	Book	Garrard	Nicholas	Ifil	Heywood	Reeves_{1}	Igoe	Robinson	Parkin	Fallon_{2}	Howard	O'Hanlon_{1}	Smith_{2}	Pook	Wells	Bulman
25/12/2005	Southend United	A	0–2	Evans	O'Hanlon	Duke	Ifil	Heywood	Hewlett	Grant	Miglioranzi	Parkin	Fallon	Holmes_{1}	Slabber_{1}	Howard_{2}	Reeves	Garrard	Book

_{1} 1st Substitution, _{2} 2nd Substitution, _{3} 3rd Substitution.
