= Stuart Storer =

English footballer and manager

Personal information
- Full name: Stuart John Storer
- Date of birth: 16 January 1967 (age 59)
- Place of birth: Rugby, England
- Height: 5 ft 11 in (1.80 m)
- Position: Midfielder

Team information
- Current team: Bedworth United (manager)

Senior career*
| Years | Team | Apps | (Gls) |
| 1983–1984 | Mansfield Town | 1 | (0) |
| 1984 | → VS Rugby (loan) | ? | (?) |
| 1984–1987 | Birmingham City | 9 | (0) |
| 1987 | Everton | 0 | (0) |
| 1987 | → Wigan Athletic (loan) | 16 | (0) |
| 1987–1993 | Bolton Wanderers | 165 | (15) |
| 1993–1995 | Exeter City | 92 | (10) |
| 1995–1999 | Brighton & Hove Albion | 152 | (14) |
| 1999 | Atherstone United | ? | (?) |
| 1999–2000 | Kettering Town | 7 | (0) |
| 2000–2001 | Chesham United | ? | (?) |
| 2001–2010 | Hinckley United | 303 | (1) |

Managerial career
- 2013: Hinckley United
- 2013–: Bedworth United
- * Club domestic league appearances and goals

Stuart Storer (born 16 January 1967) is an English former footballer, who played as a winger and is manager of Bedworth United. Stuart Storer has legendary status amongst Brighton and Hove Albion supporters. His pace and crosses from the right wing helped keep the club in the Football League in 1996–1997 season. Crucially he scored the last goal at the Goldstone Ground in a vital 1–0 win against Doncaster Rovers.

== Career ==
At the age of 40 Storer was a member of Hinckley United team that achieved their highest ever league position of fourth in the Conference North, qualifying for the play-offs, then reaching the play-off final, only to lose 4–3 on penalties.

Storer moved off the pitch at Hinckley United, and became part of the coaching staff. Beginning as first team coach, and then for the 2010–11 season became assistant manager. Storer reverted to first team coach in July 2011, and Mark Faulkner was brought in as assistant manager in August 2011. On 21 May 2013 Carl Heggs resigned as manager of Hinckley United and Stuart Storer was offered the chance to take over as manager. On 27 May, Stuart accepted the offer to become the new manager of Hinckley United but the club was closed down in October that year. He was appointed manager of Bedworth United on 5 December 2013.

== Honours ==
Bolton Wanderers

- Associate Members' Cup: 1988–89

Hinckley United

- Southern League Midlands/West Division Championship: 2000–01
