= Sam Parkin =

English footballer (born 1981)

Personal information
- Full name: Samuel Parkin
- Date of birth: 14 March 1981 (age 45)
- Place of birth: Roehampton, England
- Height: 6 ft 2 in (1.88 m)
- Position: Forward

Youth career
- 1997–1998: Chelsea

Senior career*
Years	Team	Apps	(Gls)
1998–2002	Chelsea	0	(0)
2000	→ Millwall (loan)	7	(4)
2000–2001	→ Wycombe Wanderers (loan)	8	(0)
2001	→ Oldham Athletic (loan)	7	(3)
2001–2002	→ Northampton Town (loan)	40	(4)
2002–2005	Swindon Town	124	(67)
2005–2006	Ipswich Town	22	(5)
2006–2009	Luton Town	50	(10)
2008–2009	→ Leyton Orient (loan)	13	(0)
2009–2010	Walsall	24	(3)
2010–2012	St Johnstone	23	(4)
2012	Queen of the South	15	(6)
2012–2013	St Mirren	27	(2)
2013–2014	Exeter City	26	(3)
Total		386	(111)

International career
2005	Scotland B	1	(0)
- * Club domestic league appearances and goals

Samuel Parkin (born 14 March 1981) is an English former footballer; a radio presenter for BBC Wiltshire, regularly involved with Swindon Town's coverage; and commentator for Chelsea TV. Throughout his career Parkin has played as a forward for Chelsea, Millwall, Wycombe Wanderers, Oldham Athletic, Northampton Town, Swindon Town, Ipswich Town, Luton Town, Leyton Orient, Walsall, St Johnstone, Queen of the South, St Mirren, and most recently Exeter City in League Two.

== Club career ==
=== Chelsea ===
Parkin started his career at Chelsea as a trainee. For first team experience he was loaned out.

==== Loan spells ====
Parkin joined Millwall on loan during the 2000–01 season. He scored four goals in seven appearances for the Lions. He then joined Wycombe Wanderers on loan later in the 2000–01 season. At Wycombe, Parkin scored a headed winner against Wolverhampton Wanderers during their run to the semi-finals of the FA Cup. However his loan had finished and he returned to Chelsea denying him a chance to play in the quarter-finals versus Leicester City or semi final v Liverpool. He scored one other goal for Wycombe in the Football League Trophy against Leyton Orient. Parkin also played on loan for Oldham Athletic during the 2000–01 season. He scored three goals in seven appearances for the Latics.

Parkin joined Northampton Town on loan during the 2001–02 season. He scored five goals in 46 appearances for the Cobblers.

=== Swindon Town ===
In August 2002, Parkin signed for Swindon Town, then in the Second Division. In his three seasons at the County Ground he quickly became one of the most feared goalscorers in the division after scoring a hat trick on his debut at home to Barnsley in a 3–1 victory he went on to score 67 goals in 124 league games for the Robins.

=== Ipswich Town ===
In the summer of 2005, Parkin was signed by Ipswich Town on a four-year deal for £550,000. He made his Ipswich debut against Cardiff City and scored on his second game against QPR.

Parkin was Town's top scorer with five goals in 19 games before on 22 November he incurred his first serious injury when he broke his ankle. He did not play for the first team again until the last day of April. He played two games for Ipswich in August 2006–07 before changing clubs again.

=== Luton Town ===
On 25 August 2006, Parkin was transferred to Luton Town for a fee of £340,000. He played ten games up to 17 October before serious injury struck a second time ruling out for the rest of the season. Luton were relegated to League One.

In his comeback Parkin was badly injured in his second game in August in the 2007–08 season but scored on his return to the team in late January. Luton, now in administration, suffered a second successive relegation with Parkin scoring a total of five goals in 19 league games.

Parkin returned fully recovered in the 2008–09 season, scoring three goals in the first four league games. However, as a result of financial restructuring at Luton and Parkin being one of the club's highest earners, any offers from other clubs were to be considered.

=== Leyton Orient ===
On 23 October 2008, Parkin joined League One side Leyton Orient on a three-month loan deal under O's manager Martin Ling. Following the resignation of Ling, Parkin's loan was terminated, and he returned to Luton on 19 January 2009 without scoring in his time at Brisbane Road.

Parkin played in 18 further Luton games during the season, including as a substitute in Luton's Football League Trophy final success at Wembley Stadium, scoring one goal in that time. Luton were relegated for the third successive season, dropping out of the Football League, and on 27 May 2009, Parkin was released by Luton after coming to the end of his contract.

=== Walsall ===
On 16 July 2009, Parkin signed a one-year contract with Walsall in League One. He scored three goals in 27 appearances for The Saddlers.

=== St Johnstone ===
On 15 July 2010 Parkin signed for Scottish Premier League side St Johnstone on a two-year contract.

Parkin scored five goals for St Johnstone before suffering a broken ankle in February 2011. He only made two substitute appearances for Saints in the 2011–12 season before he was released from his contract by mutual consent in January 2012.

=== Queen of the South ===
On 24 January 2012 Parkin signed for Dumfries club Queen of the South until the end of the 2011–12 season.

Parkin scored two goals on his debut in a 2–1 victory over Greenock Morton.

=== St Mirren ===
Parkin signed a one-year deal with St Mirren on 7 June 2012.

Parkin scored his first goal for the club against Dundee on 13 August 2012.

=== Exeter City ===
On 9 July 2013, Parkin completed a move to Exeter City on a free transfer. Parkin scored on his debut in a 2–1 win against Bristol Rovers on 3 August 2013.

Parkin was released by the club on 8 May 2014 after scoring three goals in 29 appearances at St James Park.

== International career ==
Parkin was eligible to play for Scotland through his Scottish mother.

He made his Scotland debut in a Scotland Future international against Austria. He was injured early in the match and was substituted.

== Media career ==
Sam Parkin is one of 3 former professional footballers, who host a podcast called Hanging Up The Boots (HUTB). The podcast features a special guest every episode. Parkin has presented for BBC Radio Wiltshire and has provided media content for his former clubs Swindon Town and Chelsea. More recently he is to be heard regularly on BBC Radio London as a co-commentator, on the podcast The Totally Football League Show, and seen as a TV pundit on the free-to-air EFL round-up show on the ITV channel. He can also be heard as an EFL co-commentator on Talksport and is regularly a guest on the BBC's Final Score show on Saturday afternoons.

== Career statistics ==
Appearances and goals by club, season and competition
Club	Season	League			National cup (Note: Includes FA Cup, Scottish Cup)		League cup (Note: Includes League Cup, Scottish League Cup)		Other		Total	
Club	Season	Division	Apps	Goals	Apps	Goals	Apps	Goals	Apps	Goals	Apps	Goals
Chelsea	2000–01	Premier League	0	0	0	0	0	0	0	0	0	0
Chelsea	2001–02	Premier League	0	0	0	0	0	0	0	0	0	0
Chelsea	Total		0	0	0	0	0	0	0	0	0	0
Millwall (loan)	2000–01	Second Division	7	4	0	0	0	0	0	0	7	4
Wycombe Wanderers (loan)	2000–01	Second Division	8	0	3	1	0	0	2 (Note: Appearance(s) in Football League Trophy)	1	13	2
Oldham Athletic (loan)	2000–01	Second Division	7	3	0	0	0	0	0	0	7	3
Northampton Town (loan)	2001–02	Second Division	40	4	2	0	2	1	2	0	46	5
Swindon Town	2002–03	Second Division	43	25	2	0	1	0	2	1	48	26
Swindon Town	2003–04	Second Division	40	19	1	0	2	3	2 (Note: Appearances in Football League Second Division play-offs)	1	45	23
Swindon Town	2004–05	League One	41	23	3	0	2	0	3	1	49	24
Swindon Town	Total		124	67	6	0	5	3	7	3	142	73
Ipswich Town	2005–06	Championship	20	5	0	0	0	0	–		20	5
Ipswich Town	2006–07	Championship	2	0	0	0	0	0	–		2	0
Ipswich Town	Total		22	5	0	0	0	0	–		22	5
Luton Town	2006–07	Championship	8	1	0	0	0	0	–		8	1
Luton Town	2007–08	League One	19	5	0	0	1	0	0	0	20	5
Luton Town	2008–09	League Two	23	4	0	0	2	0	3	0	28	4
Luton Town	Total		50	10	0	0	3	0	3	0	56	10
Leyton Orient (Loan)	2008–09	League One	13	0	2	0	0	0	0	0	15	0
Walsall	2009–10	League One	24	3	1	0	1	0	1	0	27	3
St Johnstone	2010–11	Scottish Premier League	21	4	2	0	3	1	–		26	5
St Johnstone	2011–12	Scottish Premier League	2	0	0	0	0	0	–		2	0
St Johnstone	Total		23	4	2	0	3	1	–		28	5
Queen of the South	2011–12	Scottish First Division	15	6	2	0	0	0	0	0	17	6
St Mirren	2012–13	Scottish Premier League	27	2	2	0	3	1	–		32	3
Exeter City	2013–14	League Two	26	3	1	0	1	0	1	0	29	3
Career total			386	111	21	1	18	6	16	4	441	122

== Honours ==
Luton Town

- Football League Trophy: 2008–09

St Mirren

- Scottish League Cup: 2012–13

Individual

- Swindon Town Player of the Year: 2002–03, 2004–05
- Football League One Player of the Month: February 2005
- Ipswich Town Goal of the Season: 2005–06
- Swindon Town Hall of Fame: Inducted 2017
