= Lee Flynn =

English footballer

Personal information
- Full name: Lee David Flynn
- Date of birth: 4 September 1973 (age 53)
- Place of birth: Hampstead, England
- Position: Defender

Team information
- Current team: Coggeshall United

Senior career*
Years	Team	Apps	(Gls)
1992–1994	Romford	40	(1)
1993–1995	Hendon	?	(?)
1995–2001	Hayes	145	(18)
2001–2003	Barnet	79	(4)
2003–2004	Stevenage Borough	22	(0)
2004–2006	Dagenham & Redbridge	26	(2)
2005–2006	→ St Albans City (loan)	23	(0)
2006	→ Cambridge City (loan)	5	(0)
2006–2007	St Albans City	18	(2)
2007–2011	Thurrock	?	(?)
2011–2014	Grays Athletic	97	(6)
2014–	AFC Sudbury		(1)
- Coggeshall United
- * Club domestic league appearances and goals as of 23:16, 19 August 2014 (UTC)

Lee David Flynn (born 4 September 1973 in Hampstead) is an English football defender who plays for AFC Sudbury.

== Career ==
He started his career in non-League football by signing for Romford in 1991. He then moved to Hendon before being snapped up by then Football Conference side Hayes in 1995, where he played 145 games, scoring 18 goals.

In January 2001, after six-years with Hayes, he transferred to Third Division side Barnet, making his league debut on 13 January 2001 in a 2–1 win at home to York City. He was a regular in the side until the end of the season, when Barnet were relegated to the Conference following a 3–2 defeat at home to relegation rivals Torquay United on the final day of the season.

He remained with Barnet until May 2003 when he joined Stevenage Borough. In 2004, he moved to Dagenham & Redbridge, but found his opportunities limited and was loaned out to St Albans City and Cambridge City. He impressed during his loan spell at St Albans and was signed on a permanent deal in March 2006.

Flynn joined Thurrock after leaving the Saints in March 2007. He went on to sign for Isthmian League Division One North club Grays Athletic in June 2011. Flynn played for Grays for three seasons, including their promotion to the Isthmian League Premier Division and spent a season as assistant-manager from 2013–14. He made a total of 125 appearances for Grays, scoring seven goals.

Flynn joined AFC Sudbury at the start of the 2014/15 Isthmian League Division One North season, and scored his first goal for AFC in a 3–3 draw at home to Thamesmead Town F.C.
