= Darko Mavrak =

Bosnian footballer (born 1969)

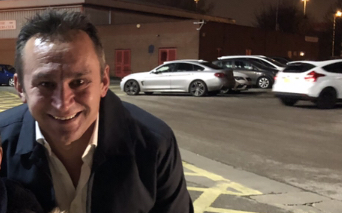
- Mavrak in 2018

Personal information
- Full name: Darko Mavrak
- Date of birth: 19 January 1969 (age 57)
- Place of birth: Mostar, SFR Yugoslavia
- Position: Midfielder

Senior career*
Years	Team	Apps	(Gls)
1989–1992	Velež Mostar	35	(2)
1992–1993	Proleter Zrenjanin	4	(0)
1993–1995	Djurgården	50	(1)
1996–1997	IFK Norrköping	26	(1)
1997	Panachaiki	8	(0)
1998	Falkenberg	8	(0)
1998–2000	Walsall	17	(2)
2001	Hapoel Tzafririm Holon	12	(2)
- * Club domestic league appearances and goals

Darko Mavrak (born 19 January 1969) is a Bosnian former professional footballer who played as a midfielder.

== Career ==
Mavrak began his career with FK Velež Mostar in the Yugoslav First League. He played with FK Proleter Zrenjanin in the 1992–93 First League of FR Yugoslavia. He moved to Swedish sides Djurgårdens IF and IFK Norrköping because of the War in Yugoslavia. He had a brief spell with Panachaiki in the Super League Greece. Mavrak finished his career with Walsall F.C. in England and Hapoel Tzafririm Holon F.C. in Israel.
