= Keith Welch =

English footballer

Personal information
- Date of birth: 3 October 1968 (age 58)
- Place of birth: Bolton, England
- Height: 6 ft 0 in (1.83 m)
- Position: Goalkeeper

Youth career
- 1986–1987: Bolton Wanderers

Senior career*
Years	Team	Apps	(Gls)
1987–1991	Rochdale	205	(0)
1991–1999	Bristol City	273	(0)
1999–2002	Northampton Town	117	(0)
2002	Tranmere Rovers	2	(0)
2002	Torquay United	3	(0)
2003	Mansfield Town	9	(0)
- * Club domestic league appearances and goals

Keith Welch (born 3 October 1968) is an English footballer who played as a goalkeeper in the Football League between the 1980s and 2000s, with Rochdale, Bristol City, Northampton Town, Tranmere Rovers, Torquay United and Mansfield Town.

He started with Bolton Wanderers as a trainee, but moved to Rochdale in 1987 and made his Football League debut with them, going on to play 205 League games for the club. He transferred to Bristol City in 1991 for £200,000 and went on to play 321 times for them before moving on in 1999.

He spent the next three seasons at Northampton Town making 127 appearances before leaving in 2002. As of January 2010 he had the third-longest spell for consecutive minutes keeping a clean sheet at Northampton, having managed 467 minutes in 2000.

He signed for Tranmere Rovers in Summer 2002, primarily to act as cover for John Achterberg, but he suffered a groin injury on his opening-day debut against Port Vale. He made his second Tranmere appearance on 21 September 2002 against Crewe Alexandra, but he dislocated his shoulder in the game, and was substituted for Tranmere's goalkeeping coach Eric Nixon. This was to be his final appearance for Tranmere although he went on to have further short spells that season with Torquay United and Mansfield Town. He made his final Football League appearance on 29 March 2003, for Mansfield against Peterborough United, and he was subsequently released by Mansfield that summer.

== Honours ==
Individual

- PFA Team of the Year: 1990–91 Fourth Division
