= Carl Heggs =

English footballer (born 1970)

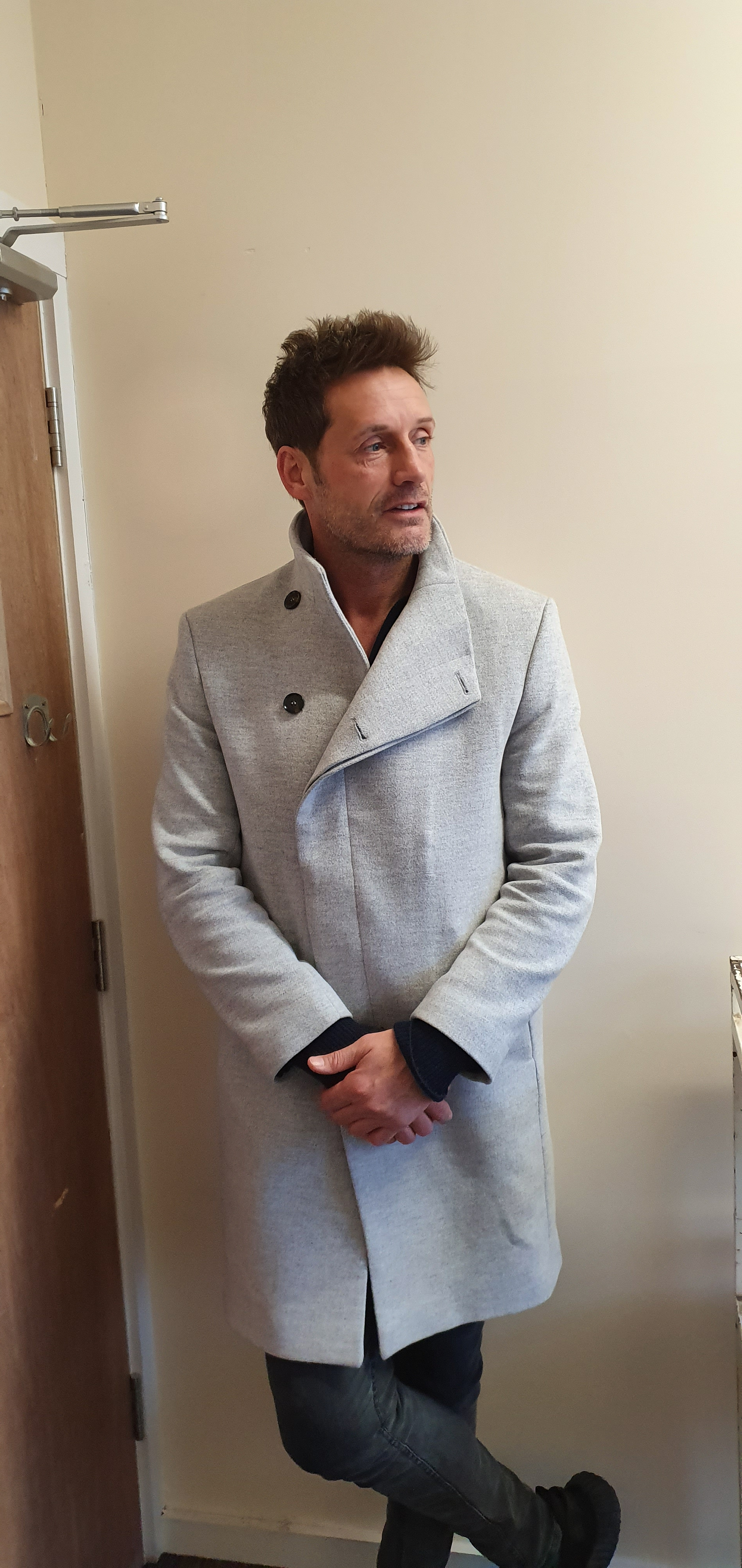

Personal information
- Date of birth: 11 October 1970 (age 56)
- Place of birth: Leicester, England
- Position: Striker

Youth career
- Leicester United

Senior career*
| Years | Team | Apps | (Gls) |
| 1991–1995 | West Bromwich Albion | 68 | (3) |
| 1995 | → Bristol Rovers (loan) | 5 | (1) |
| 1995–1997 | Swansea City | 55 | (7) |
| 1997–1998 | Northampton Town | 65 | (12) |
| 1998–2000 | Rushden & Diamonds | 45 | (8) |
| 2000 | → Chester City (loan) | 10 | (2) |
| 2000–2001 | Carlisle United | 45 | (5) |
| 2001–2002 | Forest Green Rovers | 48 | (16) |
| 2002–2005 | Ilkeston Town | 55 | (17) |
| 2005–2006 | Tamworth | 25 | (4) |
| 2006–2007 | Hinckley United | 29 | (7) |
| 2007-2008 | Redditch United | 50 | (17) |
| 2008-2009 | Tamworth | 21 | (8) |
| 2009–2009 | Redditch United | 25 | (9) |
| 2010 | Hinckley United | 2 | (0) |
| 2011–2012 | Oadby Town | 7 | (1) |
| 2012–2013 | Hinckley United | 2 | (0) |
| Total | | 445 | (122) |

Managerial career
- 2009: King's Lynn (Manager)
- 2011: Notts County (Caretaker Manager)
- 2012: Hinckley United (Assistant Manager)
- 2012–2013: Hinckley United (Manager)
- * Club domestic league appearances and goals

Carl Heggs (born 11 October 1970) is an English former professional footballer who played for 13 different clubs including West Bromwich Albion and Swansea City. Heggs was most recently manager at Hinckley United, having originally joined the club as an assistant in the summer of 2012, before resigning in May 2013. Heggs was forced out of retirement towards the end of November 2012 as Hinckley United were short for players. He was also the caretaker manager of League One side Notts County after Paul Ince was sacked in 2011.

== Playing career ==
=== West Bromwich Albion ===
Heggs was born in Leicester, England. He started his professional career in 1991 with Midlands side, West Bromwich Albion following a £25,000 move from his local side Leicester United. After progressing through the reserve team, Heggs managed to force his way in the first team setup, in which he would go on to spend four seasons with the club. Heggs made 68 appearances and found the net on three occasions for the Baggies.

=== Bristol Rovers ===
After losing his place in the first team, Heggs was seeking a return to regular first team football and joined Bristol Rovers for the later part of the 1995 season. Heggs made five appearances and scoring one goal.

=== Swansea City ===
Carl moved away from West Bromwich Albion on 27 July 1995 and joined Swansea City for a fee of £75,000. Heggs spent two seasons with the club making 55 appearances and scoring seven goals.

=== Northampton Town ===
On 1 August 1997, Heggs make the return north to join Northampton Town for £60,000, having been on the losing side against the Cobblers in the Division Three play-off final three months earlier. Heggs spent just over one season with the Cobblers, making 65 appearances and scoring 11 goals, but he would team up with manager Ian Atkins again elsewhere.

=== Rushden & Diamonds ===
Heggs signed for Rushden & Diamonds in October 1998, in a joint deal with teammate Ray Warburton worth a reported £125,000. He scored on his debut against Morecambe, but after that found goals hard to come by scoring only five in his 49 games for the club.

The undoubted highlight of Heggs' spell at Rushden was scoring the opening goal in a 3–1 FA Cup Third Round Replay defeat to Premiership side Leeds United at Elland Road.

=== Chester City ===
Heggs was unusually loaned from a non-League club to a Football League club when he joined Chester City in March 2000, as he teamed up again with Ian Atkins. However, the Blues were in grave danger of losing their league status when Heggs arrived. He quickly struck up an effective partnership with Luke Beckett, which proved particularly successful in a 5–0 win over Mansfield Town, but it was not enough to avert relegation and Heggs moved on.

=== Carlisle United ===
On 28 July 2000, Heggs joined Third Division side Carlisle United on a two-year contract. However, he only spent one season with the club, making 45 appearances and scoring five goals in the process as the side narrowly avoided relegation from Football League under Ian Atkins.

=== Forest Green Rovers ===
Heggs signed for Conference National side Forest Green Rovers in 2001 playing under former England international Nigel Spink. He spent a season at the non league side making just under 48 appearances before moving on to Ilkeston Town.

=== Tamworth ===
On 1 June 2005, Heggs joined Staffordshire side Tamworth of the Conference National. His time at Tamworth saw him involved in two notable goals. A 25-yard screamer against Halifax Town, in a 2–1 defeat and a powerful and determined run through the heart of the Stoke City defence, laying off a perfect pass for Nathan Jackson to slot into the empty net for the opening goal of the replay, however, Tamworth lost the game on penalties after drawing 1–1 in normal time.

He was even subject of a move during his time with Tamworth, but opted to turn down a move to Hucknall Town on 1 March 2006 to help Tamworth's fight against relegation. During his time with the club Heggs made 25 appearances and scored 8 goals.

=== Hinckley United ===
Heggs joined Hinckley United on 10 July 2006, with the chance of regular first team football being the major factor in his decision. Heggs, however, found that his first team promise wasn't quite as true as he was led to believe and after spending more time on the bench and out of the team than he had wished for he left after just less than six months with the club.

=== Tamworth ===
On 22 May 2007, Heggs re-joined Tamworth, stating that he was delighted to be back at club.

After 21 appearances on his return to the club and 8 goals Heggs was released after the management could not guarantee first team football.

=== Redditch United ===
Heggs re-joined Redditch United for his second spell on 17 October 2007 and was appointed as the club's player-coach.

=== Hinckley United ===
Heggs rejoined former team Hinckley United for the second time in February 2010.

=== Oadby Town ===
In August 2011, Heggs signed along with Jon Stevenson and Matt Piper, both formerly of Leicester City, for East Midlands Counties Football League side Oadby Town.

== Management career ==
Ilkeston town assistant manager 2002

Redditch United assistant manager 2007

=== King's Lynn ===
Heggs was appointed manager of King's Lynn on 1 June 2009. This was ended as the club were wound up by the HMRC.

=== Chief Scout at Notts County ===
Following his second spell, as a player, at Hinckley United, Heggs was appointed as Chief Scout at Notts County. On 3 April 2011, Heggs was appointed caretaker manager at Notts County for two matches.

=== Hinckley United ===
On 3 June 2012, Heggs was appointed assistant manager of Hinckley United, replacing Marc Faulkner for the 2012–2013 season. Heggs is highly regarded as having excellent knowledge of local football players in Leicestershire and Nottinghamshire. After Hinckley United manager Dean Thomas resigned on 10 October 2012 following an early F.A Cup exit and a poor start to the Conference North league campaign, Heggs was put in caretaker charge of the football club alongside Neil Lyne. He also "threw his hat into the ring for the manager's position on a permanent basis", according to a club statement. On Thursday, 15 November, Heggs was offered the manager's job on a permanent basis until the end of the 2012–2013 season. Heggs later accepted the offer. Heggs came out of retirement on 19 November for a game against Bradford PA with Hinckley United desperate for players.

Hegg's got his first win in charge of Hinckley United on 4 December in a Westerby Challenge Cup Round One game against St Andrews. The game finished 2–1 with goals from Jack Lane and a header from Aron Wint. On 28 February 2013, it was announced in the Hinckley Times that Heggs had signed a new contract until the end of the 2013–2014 season after being given the assurances he was looking for from the board. On 8 April 2013 Hegg's finally got his first league victory since taking charge of Hinckley United with a 6–3 win against Corby Town; a hat-trick from Luke Richards, and goals from Jack Lane, Harvey Headley and Liam Canavan gave the Knitters just their second league win of the season. On 21 May, Heggs announced his intention to resign as manager of Hinckley United to become a PE teacher at Ascot College, Derbyshire.

== Honours ==
West Bromwich Albion

- Football League Second Division play-offs: 1993
