= Adam Sollitt =

English footballer

Personal information
- Date of birth: 22 June 1977 (age 49)
- Place of birth: Sheffield, England
- Position: Goalkeeper

Team information
- Current team: Alfreton Town (Goalkeeping coach)

Youth career
- Barnsley

Senior career*
Years	Team	Apps	(Gls)
1995–1997	Barnsley	0	(0)
1997–1998	Gainsborough Trinity		
1998–2000	Kettering Town	74	(0)
2000–2002	Northampton Town	16	(0)
2002–2003	Rushden & Diamonds	3	(0)
2003–2004	Scarborough	9	(0)
2004–2005	Morecambe	27	(0)
2005–2006	Worksop Town		
2006–2009	Gainsborough Trinity		
2009–2012	Matlock Town	86	(0)
- * Club domestic league appearances and goals as of 16:30, 18 April 2010 (UTC)

Adam Sollitt (born 22 June 1977) is an English football coach and former professional footballer who is goalkeeping coach of National League North side Alfreton Town.

As a player he was a goalkeeper from 1995 to 2012. He notably played professionally for Barnsley, Northampton Town and Rushden & Diamonds, as well as playing in Non-league football for Gainsborough Trinity, Kettering Town, Scarborough, Morecambe, Worksop Town and Matlock Town.

== Playing career ==
Sollitt was promoted to the first team squad of Barnsley and was the club's third choice goalkeeper from 1995 to 1997. Manager Danny Wilson released him, following the club's promotion to the Premier League. He then signed for non league club Gainsborough Trinity who were searching for a replacement for departed veteran Steve Sherwood. His performances earned him the chance to move up a league and at the end of the season he signed for Conference club Kettering Town where he remained for two seasons.

In July, 2000, Sollitt re-signed as a professional, this time for Northampton Town for a fee of £30,000. In his two-year stay at Town, Sollitt played in 16 games for the club before moving to local rivals Rushden & Diamonds in the summer of 2002.

He went on to play for Scarborough, Morecambe, and Worksop Town before moving back to Gainsborough Trinity in 2006. Sollitt signed for Matlock Town in August 2009. Sollitt announced his retirement in 2011 and departed Matlock in 2012.

== Coaching career ==
Following retirement, Sollitt remained with Matlock Town as their goalkeeping coach before moving to a similar role with Alfreton Town in August 2019.
