= Duncan Spedding =

English footballer

Personal information
- Full name: Duncan Spedding
- Date of birth: 7 September 1977 (age 49)
- Place of birth: Camberley, England
- Height: 6 ft 1 in (1.85 m)
- Position: Midfielder

Youth career
- 1994–1996: Southampton

Senior career*
Years	Team	Apps	(Gls)
1996–1998	Southampton	7	(0)
1998–2003	Northampton Town	123	(1)
- * Club domestic league appearances and goals

Duncan Spedding (born 7 September 1977) is an English former footballer who played as a midfielder.

Spedding was signed by Southampton in 1997 after completing a spell as a trainee with the club. However, he failed to make much impact and was given a free transfer to Northampton Town the following year. Spedding spent five seasons at the club as a regular first teamer before departing in 2003.

Spedding managed a health club in Northampton in 2024. Prior to that, he was a professional sleep therapist in 2019.

He spent many years working in the fitness industry in various roles before joining a contract cleaning company in Northamptonshire in 2025, where he works as an Operations Director.

Spedding also runs a separate business specialising in helping people suffering with anxiety.
