= Select Group =

Panel of English professional football referees

The Professional Referee Group (Pro Ref), formally known as the Select Group is a panel of English professional football referees and assistant referees, appointed by Pro Ref. The group was first formed in 2001, when England became the first country to use fully professional referees in its top flight.

In June 2026 the PGMOL were rebranded to Professional Referee Group (Pro Ref), which merged Select Group 1, 2 & the Supplementary List

== Referees ==
=== Professional Referee Group ===
- Sam Allison
- Stuart Attwell
- Anthony Backhouse
- Peter Bankes
- Sam Barrott
- Elliot Bell
- James Bell
- Tom Bramall
- John Brooks
- John Busby
- Matt Corlett
- Matt Donohue
- Darren England
- Will Finnie
- Jarred Gillett
- Farai Hallam
- Tony Harrington
- Adam Herczeg
- Simon Hooper
- Robert Jones
- Chris Kavanagh
- Tom Kirk
- Andrew Kitchen
- Oliver Langford
- Andy Madley
- Robert Madley
- Stephen Martin
- Tom Nield
- Michael Oliver
- Craig Pawson
- Tom Reeves
- Ruebyn Ricardo
- Tim Robinson
- Michael Salisbury
- Josh Smith
- Lewis Smith
- Paul Tierney
- Gavin Ward
- David Webb

=== National Group Referees ===
- Aji Ajibola
- Richard Aspinall
- Ben Atkinson
- Dale Baines
- Aaron Bannister
- Michael Barlow
- Dan Blades
- Harrison Blair
- Declan Bourne
- Charles Breakspear
- Carl Brook
- Declan Brown
- Melissa Burgin
- Abigail Byrne
- Alex Chilowicz
- Steven Copeland
- Martin Coy
- Alan Dale
- William Davis
- Leigh Doughty
- Kirsty Dowle
- Darren Drysdale
- Edward Duckworth
- James Durkin
- Richard Eley
- Aaron Farmer
- Neil Hair
- Emily Heaslip
- Craig Hicks
- Paul Howard
- Andrew Humphries
- Aaron Jackson
- Scott Jackson
- Paul Johnson
- Callum Jones
- Ross Joyce
- Zac Kennard-Kettle
- George Laflin
- Oliver Mackey
- Paul Marsden
- Ross Martin
- Robert Massey-Ellis
- Simon Mather
- Matthew Mcquillan
- Adam Merchant
- Jacob Miles
- Andrew Miller
- Stuart Morland
- Sam Mulhall
- Matthew Norton
- Jamie O'Connor
- James Oldham
- Scott Oldham
- Stephen Parkinson
- Thomas Parsons
- Garreth Rhodes
- Jason Richardson
- Jamie Robinson
- David Rock
- Matthew Russell
- Lewis Sandoe
- Tolu Sangowawa
- Matthew Scholes
- Isaac Searle
- Jeremy Simpson
- Sunny Singh Gill
- Lewis B. Smith
- Niall Smith
- Benjamin Speedie
- Sebastian Stockbridge
- Lee Swabey
- Elliott Swallow
- Gareth Thomas
- Ben Toner
- Harry Wager
- Callum Walchester
- Richie Watkins
- Dean Watson
- Dean Whitestone
- James Westgate
- Martin Woods
- Ollie Yates
- Alan Young

== Assistant referees ==
=== Premier League ===
- Blake Antrobus
- Simon Bennett
- Gary Beswick
- Lee Betts
- Stuart Burt
- Dan Cook
- Neil Davies
- Nick Greenhalgh
- Constantine Hatzidakis
- Adrian Holmes
- Nick Hopton
- Akil Howson
- Ian Hussin
- Scott Ledger
- Simon Long
- James Mainwaring
- Steve Meredith
- Adam Nunn
- Dan Robathan
- Mark Scholes
- Eddie Smart
- Wade Smith
- Craig Taylor
- Richard West
- Mat Wilkes
- Tim Wood

=== Championship Assistant Referees ===
- Johnathon Bickerdike
- Conor Brown
- George Byrne
- Emily Carney
- Alan Cresswell
- Andrew Dallison
- Andrew Fox
- Hugh Gilroy
- Callum Gough
- Jacob Graham
- David Harrison
- Paul Hodskinson
- Shaun Hudson
- Robert Hyde
- Alex James
- Hristo Karaivanov
- Daniel Leach
- Jacob Lehane
- Sam Lewis
- Nigel Lugg
- Alistair Nelson
- Bhupinder Singh Gill
- Matthew Smith
- Mark Stevens
- Darren Williams
- Richard Woodward

=== National Group Assistant Referees ===
- Ryan Aldred
- Ashley Allen
- Justin Amey
- Marvyn Amphlett
- Matt Archibald
- Jon Ashworth-Sears
- Andrew Aylott
- Georgia Ball
- Damith Bandara
- Ciaran Barlow
- Conall Bartlett
- Mark Bates
- Andy Bennett
- Oliver Bickle
- Jonathon Block
- Nick Blogg
- Daniel Bonneywell
- Luke Bowles
- Alex Bradley
- Joshua Bramall
- Nicoleta Bria
- Jordan Brooks
- Karl Buckley
- Adam Burgess
- Michael Burrows
- Stuart Butler
- Marcus Carmichael
- Duncan Carratt
- William Cavanagh
- Scott Chalkley
- Isabel Chaplin
- Samuel Clayton
- Simon Clayton
- Jack Clench
- Aaron Conn
- Thomas Cooke
- Ian Cooper
- Leigh Crowhurst
- Mark Cunliffe
- Anthony Da Costa
- Andrew Daniels
- Christopher Darling
- Sophie Dennington
- Peter Dingle
- Karl Donaghey
- Steve Durnall
- Daniel D'Urso
- Drew Dutton
- Tyler Dutton
- Mark Dwyer
- George Eaton
- Andrew Ellis
- Neil Evans
- Robert Evans
- Conor Farrell
- Shaun Farrer
- Niall Felton
- Ciaran Fidler
- Stephen Finch
- Carl Fitch-Jackson
- Daniel Flynn
- Declan Ford
- Jack Forder-Hay
- Keiran Forrest
- Matthew Friend
- Dan Frizzell
- Samuel Fudge
- Graeme Fyvie
- Alex Gray
- Wayne Gray
- Thomas Green
- Wayne Grunnill
- Danny Guest
- Bradley Hall
- Aaron Hallam
- Leoni Harland
- Thomas Harland
- Thomas Harty
- Ryan Head
- Harley Hetherington
- Andrew Hickman
- Jake Hillier
- Thomas Holden
- David Holmes
- James Hooper
- Kevin Howick
- Kenwyn Hughes
- Alan Hull
- Jonathan Hunt
- James Hurst
- Christopher Husband
- David Hutton
- Danny Jarvis
- Matthew Jones
- Matthew Joyce
- Graham Kane
- Stuart Kane
- Mehul Karia
- Joseph Karram
- Paul Kelly
- Abbas Khan
- Grzegorz Kornasiewicz
- Joseph Larkin
- Conor Ledgeway
- Peter Lowe
- Matthew Malton
- Alex Mathieson
- Elliott Mayer
- Lucy-Anne McCann
- Matthew McGrath
- Ryan McILravey
- Harley McKittrick
- David Middleton
- Anthony Moore
- Kevin Morris
- Richard A. Morris
- Richard J. Morris
- Matthew Moss
- Kevin Mulraine
- Ross Murphy
- William Murray
- Zharir Mustafa
- Christopher Myatt
- Paul Newhouse
- Adam Nichol
- Jack Nield
- Oliver Nolan
- Colman O'Meara
- Declan O'Regan
- Declan O'Shea
- Martin Parker
- Matthew Parry
- Joseph Pettitt
- Steven Plane
- Lewis Raper
- Greg Read
- Adam Ricketts
- Jamie Roberts
- Jason Roberts
- Daniel Robinson
- Michael Robinson
- Simon Robinson
- Alex Rolfe
- Sean Rothwell
- Steven Rushton
- Mark Ryder
- Ryan Saward
- Karl Sear
- Mark Senior
- Francis Sibley
- Joe Simpson
- Daniel Smith
- Rob Smith
- Matthew Sowerby
- Thomas Staten
- Paul Stonier
- Graham Swanton
- Daniel Sykes
- Grant Taylor
- Scott Taylor
- James Tewson
- Jordan Tindall
- Jake Topp
- Adrian Tranter
- Dean Treleaven
- William Vaughan
- Lee Venamore
- Anastasiya Voloshchuk
- Stephen Wade
- Bailey Walker
- Timothy Walker
- Jamie Waters
- Michael Webb
- Sam Wesson
- Ryan Whitaker
- Darren Wilding
- Arran Williams
- Ceri Williams
- Ollie Williams
- Scott Williams
- Adam Wilson
- James Wilson
- Marc Wilson
- Curtis Wood
- Daniel Woodward
- Joe Wright

== Women's Select Group officials ==
In summer 2023 and summer 2024, the PGMOL provided updates on the promotions of match officials.

There are 17 Women's Super League referees, 30 Women's Super League assistant referees, 24 Women's Championship referees, and 34 Women's Championship assistant referees, although some officials hold dual roles.

=== Women's Super League referees ===
- Lisa Benn
- Melissa Burgin
- Abigail Byrne
- Phoebe Cross
- Kirsty Dowle
- Amy Fearn
- Cheryl Foster
- Stacey Fullicks
- Christina Hattersley
- Emily Heaslip
- Lauren Impey
- Lucy May
- Stacey Pearson
- Yasmin Saeed
- Jane Simms
- Adewunmi Soneye
- Megan Wilson

=== Women's Super League assistant referees ===
- Georgia Ball
- Nicoleta Bria
- Ella Broad
- Emily Carney
- Lorraine Catchpole
- Isabel Chaplin
- Abby Dearden
- Sophie Dennington
- Aaron Ford
- Hannah Gardner
- Magdalena Golba
- Levi Gray
- Leoni Harland
- Harley Hetherington
- Matthew Joyce
- Aimee Keir
- Grace Lowe
- Lucy-Anne McCann
- David Middleton
- Callum Parke
- Ali Rahjoo
- Lisa Rashid
- Chloe-Ann Small
- Ruby Sykes
- Laura Van Lier
- Anastasiya Voloshchuk
- Lauren Whiteman
- Ceri Williams

=== Women's Championship referees ===
- Jon Ashworth-Sears
- Nicoleta Bria
- Ella Broad
- Melissa Cairns
- Isabel Chaplin
- Abby Dearden
- Sophie Dennington
- Ffion Eade
- Aaron Ford
- Hannah Gardner
- Magda Golba
- Levi Gray
- Joanne Horwood
- Dora Jakab
- Aimee Keir
- Grace Lowe
- David Middleton
- Callum Parke
- Ali Rahjoo
- Chloe-Ann Small
- Ruby Sykes
- Laura Van Lier
- Jade Wardle
- Lauren Whiteman

=== Women's Championship assistant referees ===
- Folu Aladelusi
- Zeyad Ahmed
- Katie Allen
- Emmanuel Arakopgun
- Alex Beeley
- Luke Bowles
- Josh Brayshaw
- Adriana Bucur
- Michael Butcher
- Josh Dear
- Gareth Dunn
- Ralph Frostick
- Richard Fullicks
- Hannah Gardner
- Dasa Griffin
- Elora Hardstaff
- Rosie Johns
- Elle-Louise Kaplicz
- Joseph Karram
- Julia Kings
- Maya Korpal
- Lee Markwick
- Darren McCall
- David Mitchell
- Amy Purser
- Charlotte Sparling Haythornthwaite
- Rhiannon Stevens
- Daniel Sykes
- Emma Taylor
- Soada Tushaj
- Steven Walsh
- Lauren Whiteman
- Peter Wilson
- Yashar Yekta

== FIFA international match officials ==
Among the various Select Group officiating panels, there are 16 referees, 19 assistant referees, and 10 video match officials on the 2025 FIFA International List, although some hold dual roles.

All officials, except for Cheryl Foster and Ceri Williams, are listed as English representatives—Foster and Williams are listed as Welsh representatives.

=== Referees ===
- Stuart Attwell
- Sam Barrott
- Melissa Burgin
- John Brooks
- Abigail Byrne
- Kirsty Dowle
- Darren England
- Cheryl Foster
- Jarred Gillett
- Emily Heaslip
- Rob Jones
- Chris Kavanagh
- Andy Madley
- Michael Oliver
- Stacey Pearson

=== Assistant referees ===
- Georgia Ball
- Simon Bennett
- Gary Beswick
- Nicoleta Bria
- Stuart Burt
- Emily Carney
- Isabel Chaplin
- Dan Cook
- Neil Davies
- Sophie Dennington
- Leoni Harland
- Ian Hussin
- Grace Lowe
- James Mainwaring
- Lucy McCann
- Adam Nunn
- Dan Robathan
- Anastasiya Voloshchuk
- Ceri Williams
- Wade Smith

=== Video match officials ===
- Natalie Aspinall
- Stuart Attwell
- Peter Bankes
- Lee Betts
- Darren England
- Jarred Gillett
- Chris Kavanagh
- Andy Madley
- Michael Salisbury

=== Notable international appointments ===
Some former and current Select Group officials have overseen major international final matches, including: 2 World Cup finals, an Olympic final, 2 European Championship finals, and 5 Champions League finals.

Assistant referee Phil Sharp was a part of the team for the 2002 FIFA World Cup final.

Assistant referee Sian Massey-Ellis was a part of the officiating teams for the UEFA Women's Euro 2013 final and the 2018 UEFA Women's Champions League final.

Howard Webb adjudicated the 2010 UEFA Champions League final and subsequently the 2010 FIFA World Cup final. Webb was supported on both occasions by assistant referees Darren Cann and Mike Mullarkey.

Mark Clattenburg supervised the 2012 Olympic final, the 2016 UEFA Champions League final, and subsequently the UEFA Euro 2016 final. The assistant referees that supported Clattenburg during these finals, were: Simon Beck, Steve Child, and Jake Collin.

Anthony Taylor officiated the 2021 UEFA Nations League final, the 2022 FIFA Club World Cup final, and the 2023 UEFA Europa League final. For each final, Taylor was supported by assistant referees Gary Beswick and Adam Nunn.

Michael Oliver refereed the 2022 UEFA Super Cup between Real Madrid and Eintracht Frankfurt. He was assisted by Stuart Burt and Simon Bennett.

Cheryl Foster oversaw the 2023 UEFA Women's Champions League final between Barcelona and Wolfsburg.

Rebecca Welch officiated the 2024 UEFA Women's Champions League final between Barcelona and Lyon. She was assisted by Natalie Aspinall and Emily Carney.

== Former Select Group officials ==
=== Referees ===
- Martin Atkinson
- Graham Barber
- Neale Barry
- Steve Bennett
- Darren Bond
- Mark Clattenburg
- David Coote
- Mike Dean
- Phil Dowd
- Steve Dunn
- Paul Durkin
- Andy D'Urso
- Roger East
- David Elleray
- Chris Foy
- Kevin Friend
- Dermot Gallagher
- Mark Halsey
- Mike Jones
- Peter Jones
- Barry Knight
- Andre Marriner
- Lee Mason
- Sian Massey-Ellis
- Matt Messias
- Jon Moss
- Graham Poll
- Lee Probert
- Uriah Rennie
- Mike Riley
- Graham Scott
- Keith Stroud
- Rob Styles
- Neil Swarbrick
- Steve Tanner
- Anthony Taylor
- Peter Walton
- Howard Webb
- Alan Wiley
- Jeff Winter
- Eddie Wolstenholme

=== Assistant referees ===
- Stephen Artis
- Natalie Aspinall
- Nigel Bannister
- Guy Beale
- Simon Beck
- Charles Breakspear
- Dave Bryan
- Mike Bull
- Andrew Butler
- Mike Cairns
- Darren Cann
- Stephen Child
- Jake Collin
- Derek Eaton
- John Flynn
- Ron Ganfield
- Andy Garratt
- Ian Gosling
- Andy Halliday
- Patrick Keane
- Nick Kinseley
- Peter Kirkup
- Harry Lennard
- Rob Lewis
- Trevor Massey
- Mo Matadar
- Mick McDonough
- Dean Mohareb
- Mike Mullarkey
- Michael Murphy
- Andy Newbold
- Marc Perry
- Bob Pollock
- Shaun Procter-Green
- Ceri Richards
- David Richardson
- Philip Sharp
- Billy Smallwood
- John Stokes
- Gary Stott
- Paul Thompson
- Glenn Turner
- Adam Watts
- Andy Williams
- Martin Yerby

=== Select Group 2 ===
These officials made it to Select Group 2, but not Select Group 1.

=== Referees ===
- James Adcock
- Andy Davies
- Leigh Doughty
- Scott Duncan
- Geoff Eltringham
- James Linington
- Jeremy Simpson
- Ben Toner
- Andy Woolmer
- Rebecca Welch
- Dean Whitestone

=== Assistant referees ===
- Christopher Akers
- David Avent
- Andrew Aylott
- Nik Barnard
- Darren Blunden
- Ian Cooper
- Adam Crysell
- Philip Dermott
- Mark Dwyer
- Carl Fitch-Jackson
- Matthew Foley
- Mike George
- Jonathan Hunt
- Mark Jones
- Matthew Jones
- Graham Kane
- Geoffrey Liddle
- Adam Matthews
- Matthew McGrath
- Tony Peart
- Mark Pottage
- Greg Read
- Geoff Russell
- Mark Russell
- Rob Smith
- Dean Treleaven
- Lee Venamore
- Richard Wild
- James Wilson

== See also ==
- Professional Referee Organization

== Promotion and retirement links ==
- "Attwell and Tierney promoted to Select Group".
- "Chris Kavanagh called upon to officiate in the 2017/18 Premier League".
- "Jones and Swarbrick to call time on careers".
- "Four fresh faces, including two referees, will officiate in 2018/19 after being promoted to Select Group 1".
- "Child and Halliday to retire as assistant referees".
- "East blows full-time on career as referee".
- "Bankes and Madley promoted for new season".
- "Probert calls time on refereeing career".
- "Referees England and Jones promoted to Select Group 1".
- "Mason to call time on 15-year career".
- "EFL Match Officials confirmed for 2021/22 season".
- "Four new referees for 2021/22 Premier League".
- "The men, the cards, the ire: Farewell Mike Dean, Martin Atkinson, and Jon Moss". Daily Mirror. 20 May 2022.
- Wallace, Sam (21 June 2022). "Premier League facing shortfall of experienced referees as Kevin Friend steps down". The Telegraph.
- "Four new officials for 2022/23 Premier League".
- "Referee Marriner announces retirement".
- "What's new for 2023/24: Match officials".
