= Graham Scott (referee) =

English football referee (born 1968)

- Born: 10 October 1968 (age 58); Oxford, England

Domestic
Years	League	Role
2006–2008	Football Conference	National List of Referees
2008–2015	English Football League	National List of Referees
2015–2025	Premier League	Select Group of referees

Graham David Scott (born 10 October 1968) is an English former professional football referee who officiated in the Premier League. He retired at the end of the 2024–2025 season.

== Education ==
He was educated at Abingdon School from 1980 until 1987 and the London School of Economics.

== Football career ==
Scott played football at youth as a goalkeeper for Abingdon Town. A long-term back injury was a persistent problem; fearing permanent damage, he retired from playing competitive football at the age of 27.

He started refereeing in 1997, originally at lower-league level and harbouring little serious ambition of progressing to the highest echelon of football officiating. However, following positive feedback from players he decided to take the role more seriously. He joined the National List of referees in 2008, officiating many important games, including Crawley Town's upset of Bolton in the 2012–13 Football League Cup. In November 2014 he officiated his first Premier League match, between Burnley and Aston Villa.

In 2015, he was promoted to the Select Group of Referees, who officiate the matches in the Premier League, replacing long-time referee Chris Foy. In 2016, former referee Keith Hackett suggested that this promotion was "a mistake". The PGMOL sought to demote Scott at the end of the 2016–17 season after he refereed just eight Premier League matches all season – of the 19 Select Group referees, only Lee Probert refereed fewer matches. However, Scott appealed against his demotion and retained his place for the 2017–18 season. A number of improved performances has led to him to officiate an increased number of matches, with 13 Premier League matches and an EFL League Cup semi-final by the end of January 2018. He has established a reputation for consistent game management, as well as actively discouraging time-wasting, diving, and dissent, which has garnered some praise from football pundits and journalists.

== See also ==
- List of Old Abingdonians
