= Mark Clattenburg =

English football referee (born 1975)

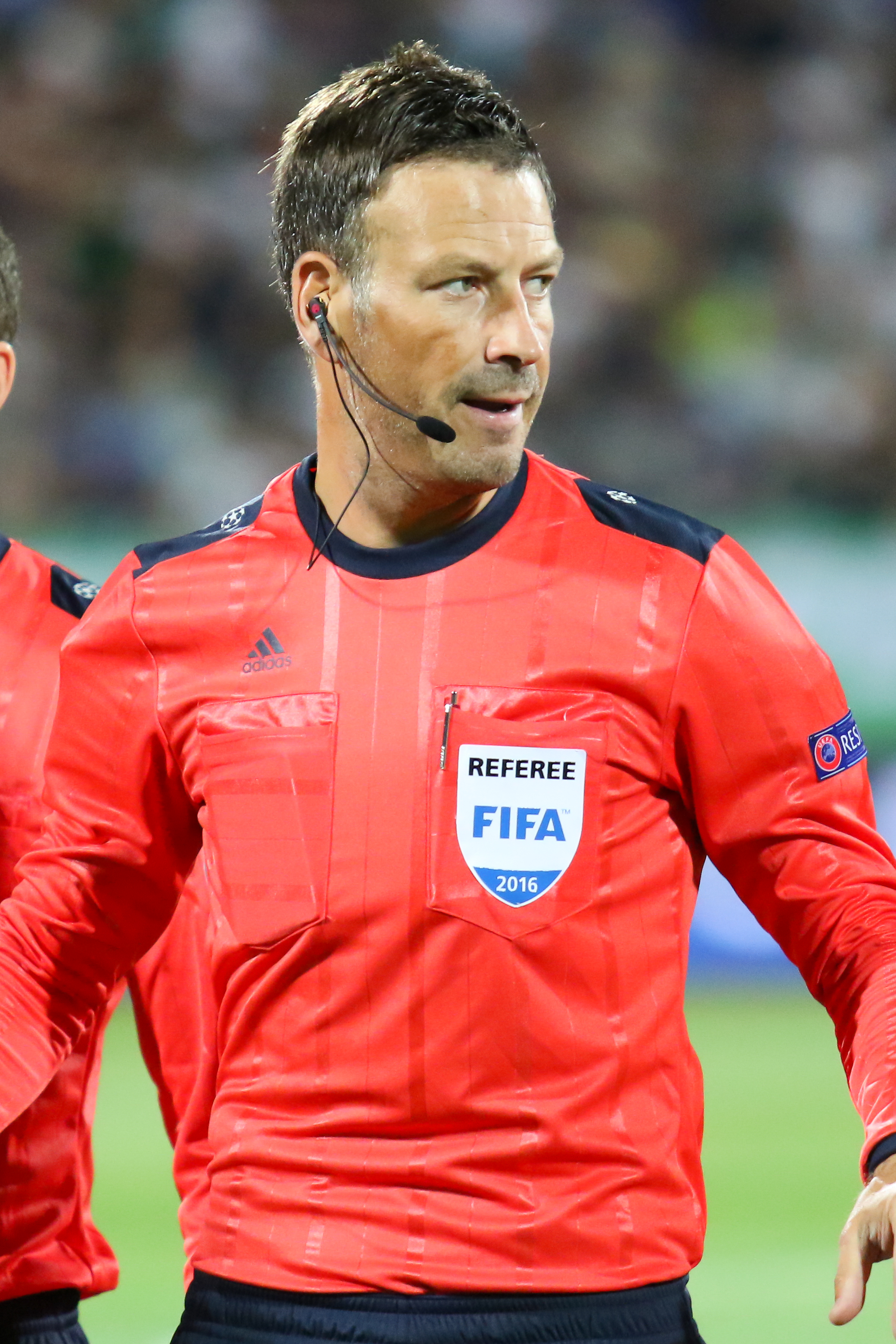
- Clattenburg in 2016
- Born: 13 March 1975 (age 51); Consett, England Origin Cramlington, England

Domestic
Years	League	Role
1993–1994	Northern League	Assistant referee
1994–1999	Northern League	Referee
1999–2000	Football Conference	Referee
1999–2000	The Football League	Assistant referee
2000–2004	The Football League	Referee
2004–2017	Premier League	Referee

International
Years	League	Role
2006–2017	FIFA listed	Referee

Mark Clattenburg (born 13 March 1975) is an English former professional football referee.

Clattenburg is a former member of the Premier League and the Durham County Football Association and also a former FIFA referee. He has refereed a number of notable matches, including the 2016 UEFA Champions League final and the Euro 2016 Final. Clattenburg is considered one of the most highly-rated European referees of his generation.

Clattenburg is the lead referee in the BBC 2024 revival of TV show Gladiators.

== Career ==
=== Early career ===
Born in Consett, County Durham, Clattenburg took up refereeing in 1990 as part of The Duke of Edinburgh's Award and became an assistant referee in the Northern League at the age of 18, later refereeing in that league. He became both a Football Conference referee and a Football League assistant referee in the year 1999, but was rapidly promoted to the National List of Football League referees in the year 2000. He had served only one year as an assistant – a record shared with Steve Baines – but his promise led to quicker promotion. His debut Football League match (at the age of just 25 – a one-time post-War record) was between Chesterfield and York City on 12 August 2000, with Chesterfield winning 4–1. Clattenburg was then fourth official for the 2001–02 Division Three play-off final and the 2002–03 FA Trophy final.

In the 2002–03 season, Clattenburg was chosen to referee two play-off semi-finals – the Division One first-leg 1–1 draw between Nottingham Forest and Sheffield United at the City Ground on 10 May 2003, and the Division Two second-leg home win by Queens Park Rangers over Oldham at Loftus Road on 14 May 2003, which put Rangers through to the final.

On 15 May 2004, he refereed the Division One play-off semi-final first leg between Ipswich and West Ham at Portman Road, which was won 1–0 by the home side. He followed this with his appointment at Cardiff's Millennium Stadium on 31 May 2004 for the Division Three play-off final contested by Mansfield and Huddersfield, which required a penalty shoot-out after the match finished 0–0 after extra time. Huddersfield won the shoot-out 4–1. Also in 2004, he became a Select Group referee in the Premier League, and his debut match at this level was the 3–1 away win by Everton against Crystal Palace on 21 August of the same year.

=== Turning professional ===
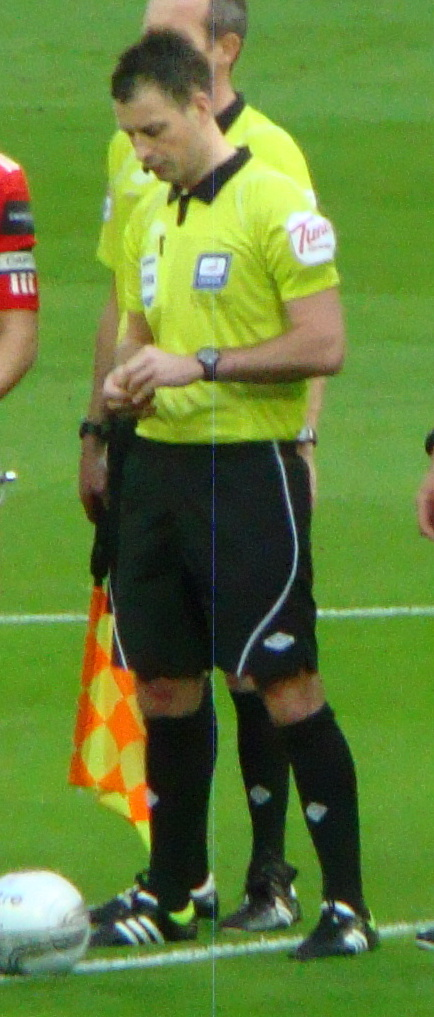
Clattenburg refereeing the 2012 Football League Cup Final

Clattenburg became a FIFA referee in 2006, at the age of 30, two years after turning professional. He refereed Alan Shearer's testimonial match on 11 May 2006; he is a Newcastle United fan, and therefore does not referee competitive games involving Newcastle. On 9 September 2006, he took charge of a qualifying match for the 2007 UEFA Under-17s Championship at the Gradski Stadium in Skopje between Macedonia and Denmark; the away side winning 3–0.

Clattenburg was appointed to control both legs of the 2006–07 FA Youth Cup final, contested by Liverpool and Manchester United, firstly at Anfield on 16 April 2007 which United won 2–1, and then at Old Trafford on 26 April 2007 which Liverpool won 1–0. With the aggregate scores tied, Liverpool won the subsequent penalty shoot-out 4–3 after a goalless 30 minutes of extra time.

On 6 August 2008 he refereed his first UEFA Champions League match, a 5–0 away win for Fenerbahçe at MTK Budapest. Clattenburg's next Champions League appointment was not until 3 November 2010 when he took charge of Auxerre's 2–1 win over visitors Ajax.

=== Investigation of debts ===
In the summer of 2008, Clattenburg was appointed to referee that year's FA Community Shield, with Dave Richardson and Ian Gosling assisting and Andre Marriner acting as fourth official. However, Clattenburg was later suspended from refereeing, pending an investigation into alleged debts incurred by companies to which he was connected. The Shield match between Portsmouth and Manchester United took place at Wembley Stadium with Peter Walton as the replacement referee.

Following the investigation into his personal life and business debts, the referees' governing body dismissed Clattenburg, citing a breach of contract. He denied all the allegations and appealed against the decision. On 18 February 2009 the Professional Game Match Officials Board reinstated Clattenburg as a Select Group referee. However, he had to serve an eight-month suspension, starting from his original suspension date of 6 August 2008. Upon his return from suspension on the last day of the Premier League season, Clattenburg refereed a fixture between Manchester City and Bolton Wanderers — his only domestic appointment of that season.

=== 2010–2012 ===
Clattenburg was involved in a FIFA World Cup as a fourth official for a 2010 tournament UEFA qualifying group 4 match between Azerbaijan and Russia in Baku on 14 October 2009.

He has officiated qualifying games for Euro Championships. In September 2010 he oversaw a 4–4 draw between Portugal and Cyprus, a qualifier for Euro 2012. His first Euro Championship match however was a 4–0 home win for Denmark over Liechtenstein, a group F qualifier for Euro 2008.

Clattenburg was appointed to referee the 2012 Football League Cup Final between Liverpool and Cardiff City at Wembley Stadium on 26 February 2012. Liverpool won a penalty shoot-out 3–2 after extra-time finished 2–2. He booked three players during the game and was rarely required to interpret any contentious moments.

He officiated at UEFA Euro 2012 as an additional assistant referee in a team led by Howard Webb. Clattenburg was also selected as one of the referees for the men's football tournament of the 2012 Olympic Games. He officiated a group stage match between Egypt and New Zealand at Old Trafford, a quarter-final between Senegal and Mexico and the gold medal match between Brazil and Mexico, both at Wembley Stadium.

Clattenburg refereed a Champions League quarter-final first leg on 2 April 2013 between Bayern Munich and Juventus after which former Bayern player Paul Breitner praised the official for letting the game flow. Bayern won the leg 2–0.

On 28 October 2012, Chelsea made a formal complaint to the Football Association against Clattenburg about his alleged use of "inappropriate language" towards Mikel John Obi during that day's match against Manchester United. The FA cleared Clattenburg of wrongdoing nine days later and charged Mikel with using "threatening and/or abusive and/or insulting words and/or behaviour" towards Clattenberg after the match. He returned to duty as the fourth official for a fixture between Tottenham Hotspur and West Ham United on 25 November and refereed Norwich City's Premier League game at Southampton for his full return to the middle on 28 November 2012. He was given a standing ovation by sections of both sets of fans at the game, which finished 1–1, and the managers of both clubs said afterward that they were "pleased to see him back".

=== 2013–2015 ===
Clattenburg refereed the 2013 FA Community Shield between Wigan Athletic and Manchester United at Wembley Stadium on 11 August 2013. United won the match 2–0.

In July 2014, Clattenburg was appointed as the referee for the 2014 UEFA Super Cup final between Real Madrid and Sevilla, in Cardiff. In October of that year, Clattenburg was stood down for one weekend following a Crystal Palace game for phoning manager Neil Warnock and for travelling from the fixture alone (Premier League rules state all match officials must not be involved in any conversation with a manager after a game and require all officials to travel to and from a match together). Clattenburg’s reasoning was that of attending an Ed Sheeran gig later in the day.

=== 2016 ===
Clattenburg refereed the 2016 FA Cup Final, contested by Crystal Palace and Manchester United. The match went to extra-time and Manchester United won by a scoreline of 2–1.

Clattenburg was selected as the referee of the 2016 UEFA Champions League Final between Real Madrid and Atlético Madrid in Milan on 28 May. Real Madrid went on to win the match 5–3 after extra time and penalties.

Clattenburg officiated at several matches at UEFA Euro 2016. Late in a group match between the Czech Republic and Croatia in Saint-Étienne, Croatian hooligans threw flares onto the pitch and Clattenburg suspended the match for several minutes, moving the players away from the burning flares to avoid injury.

Clattenburg went on to referee the UEFA Euro 2016 Final between Portugal and France on 10 July, which Portugal went on to win 1–0 after extra time.

=== Premier League exit ===
On 16 February 2017, the PGMOL announced that Clattenburg had left his position as a Premier League referee for a role with the Saudi Arabian Football Federation, replacing Howard Webb as the country's Head of Refereeing.

=== China ===
On 23 February 2019, it was announced that Clattenburg had been hired by CFA to become one of the professional referees in China.

=== Leisure Leagues ===
In 2017, Clattenburg was announced as an Ambassador for Leisure Leagues agreeing to become their Head Referee as part of this, he was a guest of honour at the formation of the International Socca Federation in Birmingham UK, refereeing the final of the 6 a side World Cup in 2019 as Germany beat Poland.

He was also there in 2019, as the World Cup went to Crete, refereeing with fellow former Premier League referee Bobby Madley.

In June 2018, he refereed the 2018 CONIFA World Football Cup final

=== Egypt ===
On 5 August 2022, he was appointed as president of the Egyptian Referees Committee in order to improve the performances of local referees. On 24 January 2023, he resigned from his position and left Egypt, due to threats from fans after Zamalek SC president Mortada Mansour alleged that he was in a gay relationship, in addition to unpaid £32,000-a-month salary for the last two months.

=== Return to England ===
In February 2024, Clattenburg was appointed by Nottingham Forest as the club's referee analyst. He left the role on 3 May 2024.

== List of notable matches ==
Notable matches refereed by Clattenburg include:

- 2012 Football League Cup final
- 2012 Olympics men's final
- 2013 FA Community Shield
- 2014 UEFA Super Cup
- 2016 FA Cup final
- 2016 UEFA Champions League final
- UEFA Euro 2016 final
- 2018 CONIFA World Football Cup final

== Statistics ==
=== Match breakdown ===
Clattenburg refereed 297 Premier League matches, 37 in the FA Cup, 28 in the Champions League, 21 in the EFL Cup, 4 in European Championships, and 3 at the Olympics.

=== Games and cards ===
Season	Games	Total (yellow card)	(yellow card) per game	Total (red card)	(red card) per game
2000–01	24	67	2.79	4	0.17
2001–02	33	103	3.12	6	0.18
2002–03	35	135	3.86	8	0.23
2003–04	34	104	3.06	2	0.06
2004–05	28	83	2.96	5	0.18
2005–06	24	81	3.38	4	0.17
2006–07	42	166	3.95	3	0.07
2007–08	39	124	3.18	10	0.26
2008–09	2	0	0.00	0	0.00
2009–10	42	105	2.50	5	0.12
2010–11	40	123	3.08	7	0.18
2011–12	36	115	3.19	8	0.22
2012–13	36	104	2.89	6	0.17
2013–14	42	145	3.45	6	0.13
2014–15	47	172	3.66	5	0.11
2015–16	46	162	3.52	7	0.15
2016–17	30	105	3.5	4	0.13
Total	576	1894	3.29	90	0.16
Source: Soccerbase

Statistics are for all competitions, including domestic, European and international. No records are available prior to 2000–01.

== Media work ==
Clattenburg joined the ESPN commentary team for Euro 2020 as their officiating and VAR expert. He expanded his role with ESPN to also work MLS and USMNT games.

Clattenburg refereed the 2022, 2023, 2025 and 2026 Sidemen Charity Matches and several Soccer Aid matches for charity.

Clattenburg is also the lead referee in the BBC 2024 revival of TV show Gladiators.

Clattenburg is also the officiating and VAR expert for FOX Sports at the FIFA World Cup 2026.

== Personal life ==
Clattenburg went to Cramlington Community High School and was chosen to play football for them, as well as South Northumberland. He is divorced from his wife with whom he lived in Chester-le-Street; they had one son during their marriage.

== Honours and accolades ==
- IFFHS "The World's Best Referee": 2016

== Bibliography ==
Date	Title	Publisher	ISBN
30 September 2021	Whistle Blower	Headline Publishing Group	978-1-4722-8203-3

== See also ==
- List of football referees

Sporting positions (United Kingdom) / (England) Mark Clattenburg
Preceded by 2008 (Hungary) Viktor Kassai	2012 FIFA Men's Olympic Football Tournament Final Referee	Succeeded by 2016 (Iran) Alireza Faghani
Preceded by 2013 (Sweden) Jonas Eriksson	2014 UEFA Super Cup Referee	Succeeded by 2015 (Scotland) Willie Collum
Preceded by 2015 (Turkey) Cüneyt Çakır	2016 UEFA Champions League Final Referee	Succeeded by 2017 (Germany) Felix Brych
Preceded by 2012 (Portugal) Pedro Proença	UEFA Euro 2016 final Referee	Succeeded by 2020 (Netherlands) Björn Kuipers
