= Jon Moss (referee) =

English football referee (born 1970)

Jonathan Moss
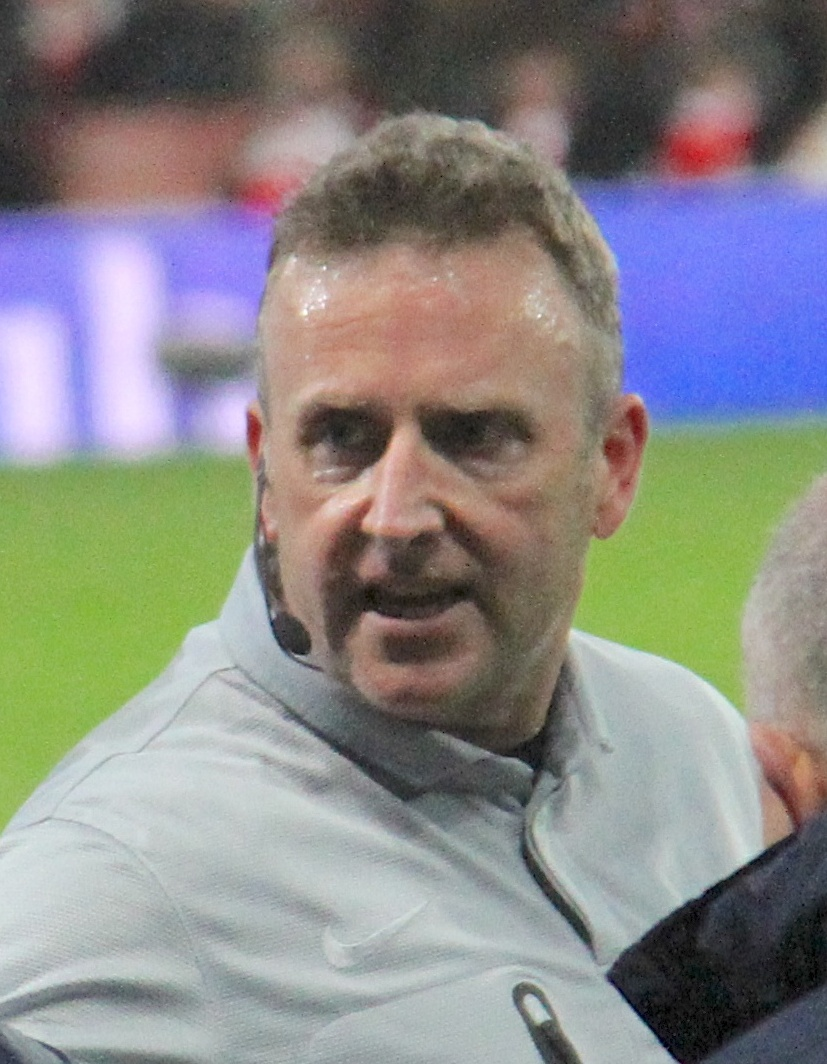
- Moss in 2014
- Full name: Jonathan Moss
- Born: 18 October 1970 (age 56); Sunderland, County Durham, England
- Other occupation: PE teacher, Record shop owner

Domestic
Years	League	Role
1999–2005	Northern Counties East/Northern Premier League	Referee
2003–2005	The Football League	Assistant referee
2005–2022	The Football League	Referee
2011–2022	Premier League	Referee

Jonathan Moss (born 18 October 1970) is an English former professional football referee who officiated primarily in the Premier League having been promoted to the Select Group of Referees in 2011. After his retirement, Moss became Select Group 1 Manager however left the role in March 2024.

He was born in Sunderland but is now based in Horsforth, West Yorkshire. He is a member of the West Riding County Football Association.

== Career ==
Born in Sunderland, Moss grew up as a keen footballer and won a football scholarship at Central Connecticut State University in the United States but completed his studies with a degree in teaching and physical education at the University of Leeds. He played junior football at academy level, firstly for his hometown club Sunderland and then for Millwall, but stopped doing so when travel to the London club interfered with his studies.

Moss began taking refereeing courses as part of his A-level physical education studies. Although he qualified as a referee in 1988 he did not fully focus on his refereeing until he stopped playing football in 1999. Moss was employed by the Westbrook Lane Primary School in Leeds as a physical education teacher, where he taught future Premier League midfielder James Milner; Milner was later shown a red card by Moss in a Premier League match in 2019.

After progressing through the Northern Counties East League and Northern Premier League, Moss was promoted to the National Group of assistant referees in 2003. He was appointed to referee the 2005 Conference play-off final between Carlisle United and Stevenage Borough. He was then promoted to the National Group of Referees who officiate in the Football League; his first game was between Shrewsbury and Rochdale.

Moss became a regular official in the Football League and was appointed to a Premier League contest in December 2010 between Wigan Athletic and Aston Villa, however it was postponed due to heavy snow. He was later appointed to Birmingham City's visit to Blackpool in January 2011. Moss had been promoted to the list of Select Group Referees, who officiate all Premier League matches, for the 2011–12 season alongside fellow newly promoted referee Neil Swarbrick. He was the referee for the 2015 FA Cup Final between Arsenal and Aston Villa.

On 17 April 2016, following a 2–2 draw between Leicester City and West Ham United, Moss' refereeing decisions during the match were heavily scrutinised, with Alan Shearer noting the "inconsistencies were mind-boggling". On 4 February 2018, Moss drew criticism for his refereeing decisions in a Premier League match between Liverpool and Tottenham Hotspur, which ended in a 2–2 draw. Moss was seen on camera asking fourth official Martin Atkinson if there was "anything from TV", even though VAR was not in operation, before he decided to award Tottenham a penalty. During stoppage time, Moss consulted with assistant referee Eddie Smart to clarify if Harry Kane had been offside before awarding Tottenham another penalty. The Professional Game Match Officials Limited (PGMOL) admitted that Moss was "misguided" to ask the fourth official for help using television when awarding Tottenham's first penalty, but defended his decisions.

Moss retired from refereeing at the end of the 2021–22 season, and took up a new role of Select Group 1 Manager at the PGMOL which he held until his departure in March 2024.

=== Statistics ===
Season	Games	Total (yellow card)	(yellow card) per game	Total (red card)	(red card) per game
2005–06	31	108	3.48	8	0.26
2006–07	40	99	2.48	9	0.23
2007–08	38	106	2.79	7	0.18
2008–09	39	106	2.72	7	0.18
2009–10	37	121	3.27	8	0.22
2010–11	42	87	2.07	10	0.24
2011–12	32	112	3.50	11	0.34
2012–13	31	86	2.77	1	0.03
2013–14	35	105	3.00	4	0.11
2014–15	37	142	3.83	9	0.24
2015–16	33	97	2.94	7	0.22
2016–17	37	141	3.81	3	0.08
2017–18	35	125	3.57	4	0.11
2018–19	36	128	3.56	7	0.20
2019–20	32	102	3.19	3	0.09
2020–21	32	82	2.56	2	0.06
2021–22	31	75	2.42	4	0.13

Statistics are for all competitions. No records are available prior to 2005–06.
