= Darren England =

English football referee (born 1985)

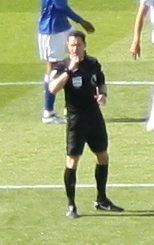
- England in 2025
- Full name: Darren England
- Born: 23 December 1985 (age 40)

Domestic
Years	League	Role
?–2015	Football Conference	Referee
2015–2020	The Football League	Referee
2020–	Premier League	Referee

International
Years	League	Role
2022–	FIFA listed	Referee

Darren England (born 23 December 1985) is an English football referee, who was promoted to the Premier League in August 2020. In December 2021, the PGMOL announced that England had been added to the 2022 FIFA List of International Match Officials.

Prior to this, England had been a Select Group 2 referee since 2017, and prior to this, he had been a Premier League assistant referee between 2012 and 2015.

== Career ==
He refereed the League Two Play-Off Final in 2017 between Blackpool v Exeter City and then was promoted to the Select Group 2 list.

On 30 September 2023, England was on VAR duty for a Premier League match between Tottenham Hotspur and Liverpool, a game which resulted in a 2–1 victory for Spurs. Luis Diaz had a goal ruled out for offside by the linesman – the decision was not questioned by England or any of his colleagues in VAR despite an "unusually quick decision" with no lines being drawn. After the match, PGMOL released a statement admitting that this was a "significant human error" and that "VAR failed to intervene". England, along with assistant VAR Dan Cook, were subsequently dropped for their following Premier League fixtures.

In November 2026 he began VAR refereeing in the Champions League.
