= Simon Hooper =

English association football referee (born 1982)

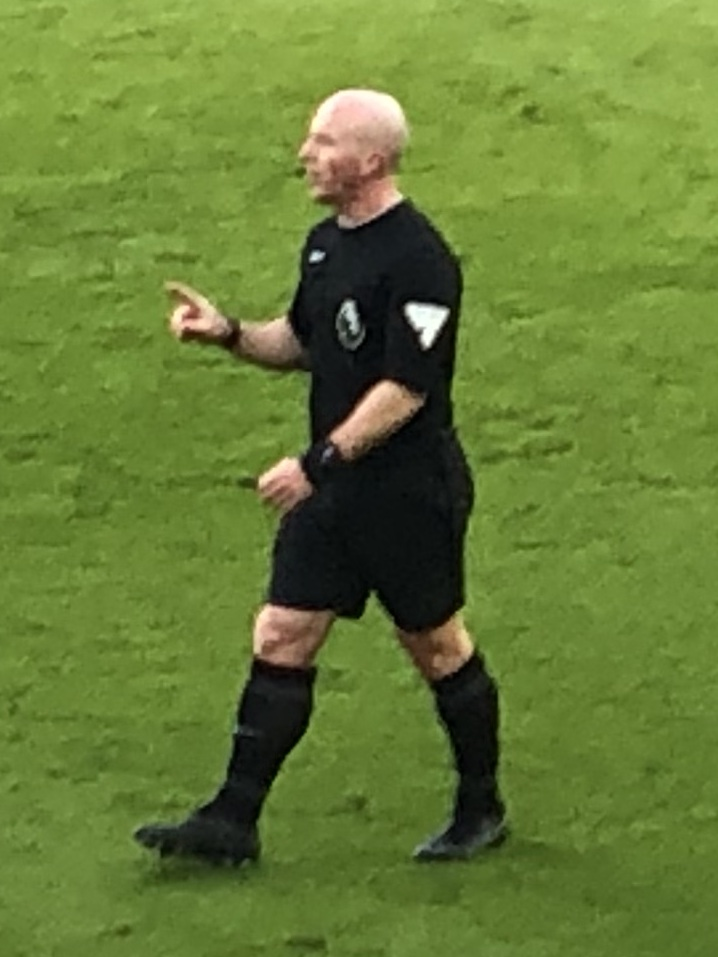
- Hooper in 2024
- Born: 3 May 1982 (age 44); Swindon, Wiltshire, England

Domestic
Years	League	Role
?–2008	National League	Referee
2008–18	The Football League	Referee
2018–	Premier League	Referee

Simon Hooper (born 3 May 1982) is an English football referee who officiates primarily in the Premier League. His county FA is the Wiltshire Football Association. He was promoted to the Select Group in 2018.

== Career ==
On 8 August 2015, Hooper refereed his first Premier League match between Norwich City and Crystal Palace, a game which ended in a 1–3 victory for the visitors. In that game, he controversially disallowed Cameron Jerome's bicycle kick goal for dangerous play.

On 29 September 2018, Hooper refereed his third Premier League match and his first since his promotion to Select Group 1 between Newcastle United and Leicester City, with the game ending in a 0–2 victory for Leicester.

On 14 August 2023, Hooper was the referee for a Premier League match featuring Manchester United and Wolverhampton Wanderers, a game which ended in a 1–0 win for the hosts. In injury time, United goalkeeper Andre Onana collided with Wolves forward Sasa Kalajdzic in the penalty area. Despite protests from players, Hooper did not award Wolves a penalty and VAR did not intervene on the decision. After the game, PGMOL apologized to Wolves manager Gary O'Neil for the error, admitting that a penalty should have been given. Hooper and two VAR officials were subsequently dropped from refereeing for the following Premier League weekend fixtures.

On 30 September 2023, Hooper was the referee for a Premier League match between Tottenham Hotspur and Liverpool, a game which resulted in a 2–1 victory for Spurs. Luis Diaz had a goal ruled out for offside by the linesman – the decision was not questioned by VAR despite an "unusually quick decision" with no lines being drawn. Subsequently released VAR audio recordings showed Hooper praising the VAR team in the immediate aftermath of the decision, saying "Well done, boys. Good process." After the match, PGMOL released a statement admitting that this was a "significant human error" and that "VAR failed to intervene". Liverpool later released a statement acknowledging PGMOL's admission of failure, stating that it was "unsatisfactory that sufficient time was not afforded to allow the correct decision to be made and that there was no subsequent intervention", and that they will "explore a range of options ... given the clear need for escalation and resolution".

On 3 December 2023, Hooper was the referee for a Premier League fixture between Manchester City and Tottenham Hotspur, which ended in a 3–3 draw. In the 94th minute, Erling Haaland was fouled, but immediately got back up and passed the ball to Jack Grealish, who had a clear opportunity to score. Despite initially appearing to play the advantage, Hooper then blew his whistle, calling for play to be stopped and a free kick to be taken by Man City where Haaland was fouled. Man City players, most notably Haaland, responded aggressively, surrounding Hooper and shouting at him for not giving them the advantage and denying them a possible winning goal. The decision was widely criticised, with Jermaine Jenas calling it "an absolute shocker" when appearing on Match of the Day 2. In a post match interview, Ruben Dias called it a "frustrating decision" and "one that shouldn't have happened". Haaland later posted a clip of the incident on Twitter with a caption simply reading "Wtf". While he did not face personal charges, the FA issued a charge against Man City and stated "the club failed to ensure their players do not behave in a way which is improper". Pep Guardiola accepted the charge but stood by his players, supporting their reactions by saying "it's emotions, it's feelings". The League chose not to suspend Hooper from refereeing, acknowledging his decision as a human error.
