= Eddie Wolstenholme =

English football referee (born 1954)

- Born: c. 1954 (age 71–72); Preston, Lancashire, England
- Other occupation: Engineering fitter

Domestic
Years	League	Role
?-1992	North West Counties League	Referee
?-1992	Football League	Asst. referee
1992–2001	Football League	Referee
2001–2003	Premier League	Referee

International
Years	League	Role
2002–2003	FIFA / FA approved	Fourth official

Edward K. Wolstenholme (born c. 1954, Preston, Lancashire) is an English former football referee who officiated in the Football League and the Premier League. He now lives in Blackburn, Lancashire, and may be remembered as the referee in charge of a football match in 2002 described as the "Battle of Bramall Lane". His other occupation before becoming a professional for PGMOL in 2001 was as an engineering fitter.

== Career ==
Wolstenholme took up refereeing in 1978, when an injury forced him to give up playing non-League football for Walton-le-Dale. After starting off in Sunday leagues, he then officiated in the West Lancashire Football League, eventually moving up to the North West Counties League, and in season 1992–93 the Football League list, after having gained experience as a League linesman. His first match after being promoted was the 4–2 win by Crewe Alexandra over Torquay United in the old Second Division on 15 August 1992.

At the close of the 1997–98 season, he was selected not only to referee the old First Division play-off semi-final second leg, but the Final itself. The semi-final second leg occurred on 13 May 1998, between Charlton Athletic and Ipswich Town at The Valley, and Charlton progressed by winning this 1–0 for a 2–0 aggregate score. The Final took place at Wembley on 25 May 1998, and Charlton's opponents were Sunderland. The score being 3–3 at the end of 90 minutes, extra time was played, with both sides scoring to make the final score 4–4. This meant that a penalty shoot-out was necessary, and Charlton gained a 7–6 "sudden death" triumph to secure their place in the Premier League for the 1998–99 season.

The end of the 2000–01 season was very busy for Wolstenholme. He was first appointed to oversee the FA Vase Final on 6 May 2001 at Villa Park, Birmingham, played between Berkhamsted Town and Taunton Town, when the Somerset side won 2–1. Then, on 13 May 2001, he took charge of the Third Division play-off semi-final first leg between Hull City and Leyton Orient, which finished 1–0 to Orient.

The following day, he refereed the 4–2 home win by Walsall over Stoke City in a Second Division play-off semi-final second leg, which was also the cumulative score that secured Walsall's progression. Lastly, he was given the honour of refereeing the League One play-off final as well, played at the Millennium Stadium, Cardiff, on 27 May 2001, when Walsall won promotion to the First Division by beating Reading 3–2.

He was offered full professional terms by the Professional Game Match Officials Board during the following close season in 2001, and agreed to join the Select Group of referees officiating in the Premier League, although this would only be for a maximum of two seasons before his retirement due to age restrictions. He took charge of his first ever Premier League match during the fixture involving Ipswich Town and Derby County at Portman Road on 21 August 2001, the home club winning 3–1.

In 2002, Wolstenholme was involved in a match which remains in the record books despite not being played to completion. Sheffield United played West Bromwich Albion at their home ground, Bramall Lane, in the First Division on 16 March. He dismissed three Sheffield United players during the course of the game. Goalkeeper Simon Tracey was sent off after nine minutes for a handball outside the penalty area. Then, after Georges Santos launched a two-footed tackle against Albion midfielder Andy Johnson on 65 minutes, he was also sent off. A minute later, Patrick Suffo was dismissed after headbutting Derek McInnes. Two other players then had to be withdrawn injured after 77 minutes, and with no replacements available, Wolstenholme had to abandon the game due to United having fewer than seven players left on the field. Amongst other sanctions taken by the Football Association, Sheffield United were fined £10,000 and their manager Neil Warnock £300. Santos was given a two-match ban and Suffo was fined £3,000. Neither player played for United again. The score at the time of the abandonment was 3–0 to West Bromwich Albion, and the result was allowed to stand despite the game not being completed. The match was subsequently popularised with the title "the Battle of Bramall Lane".

In the final minute of the Everton versus Chelsea match at Goodison Park on 7 December 2002, and with the score 3–1 to Chelsea, Wolstenholme sent off Everton's David Unsworth for "violent conduct" (using his knee) after an incident involving Chelsea's Danish winger, Jesper Grønkjær. After the match was over, Everton manager David Moyes had to be dissuaded from confronting Wolstenholme in his dressing room by five police officers. Wolstenholme said: "Striking an opponent is a red-card offence and it doesn't matter what you strike him with. Things will have to go through the proper channels now and I'll probably look at it again." Despite this, the red card was upheld, although Everton did manage to prevent Wolstenholme from being involved during their match against Bolton Wanderers 21 days later when Matt Messias replaced him as fourth official.

On 12 February 2003, he was fourth official during the 3–1 home defeat for England against Australia in a friendly match at Upton Park, London. This was the most notable appointment throughout his sparse international involvement.

After the 2–0 home win by Millwall over Coventry City in the First Division on 5 May 2003, Wolstenholme retired from refereeing, having officiated for only two seasons in the Premiership.

He then took up the role of a referees' assessor. While in that position prior to a Premier League match between Burnley and Newcastle United at Turf Moor in November 2018, Wolstenholme suffered a heart attack. The match was delayed by 30 minutes and he was hospitalised. He was later required to have heart bypass surgery.

== Retirement and family life ==
Wolstenholme worked as an engineering fitter in Preston, before briefly becoming a full-time paid referee from 2001 until his retirement in 2003. He has since become Referees' Officer for the Lancashire County Football Association. He still lives in the Pleckgate area of Blackburn, with his wife, Fiona, and they have two children, a son and a daughter.
