= Darren Bond =

English football referee (born 1978)

- Born: 1978 (age 47–48); Lancashire, England

Domestic
Years	League	Role
2009–2010	Premier League 2	Referee
2011–2012	National League	Referee
2012–2024	English Football League	Referee
2023–2025	Premier League	Referee

International
Years	League	Role
2013–2026	FIFA listed	Referee

Darren Bond (born 1978) is an English former football referee. From 2023 to 2025, he officiated in the Premier League.

== Career ==
Born in Lancashire in 1978, Bond began refereeing when he was 15. By 2016 he had 20 years of experience, including one year as an assistant referee in the Premier League, and was named on the Select Group Two list of referees for the EFL Championship. Bond was barred from refereeing Wigan Athletic matches due to his support for the club.

On 19 September 2017 in the third round of the EFL Cup between Burnley and Leeds United, Bond ruled that the penalty shootout would be held in front of the home fans at Turf Moor, on the safety advice of the Lancashire Constabulary. Burnley lost it 5–3. In 2018 and 2020 he faced criticism for on-field decisions made against Peterborough United and Cardiff City.

Bond made his Premier League debut on 3 January 2023 in Fulham's 1–0 win away to Leicester City. He refereed four games that season and was promoted to a permanent referee in the league by Professional Game Match Officials Limited (PGMOL).

On 14 January 2023, Bond officiated a 2–2 Championship draw between Reading and Queens Park Rangers. He was called a "bottler" by Reading manager Paul Ince for not giving the Royals a penalty kick when Shane Long went down under pressure from Rob Dickie; former referee Chris Foy defended the decision.

On 18 June 2026, PGMOL announced Bond's retirement. He had not officiated in the Premier League since the last day of the season a year earlier.

== Career statistics ==
Season	Games	Total (yellow card)	(yellow card) per game	Total (red card)	(red card) per game
2010–11	6	15	2.50	1	0.17
2011–12	26	66	2.54	6	0.23
2012–13	19	61	3.21	4	0.21
2013–14	26	102	3.92	5	0.19
2014–15	21	55	2.62	1	0.05
2015–16	31	101	3.26	3	0.10
2016–17	36	108	3.00	6	0.17
2017–18	32	112	3.50	7	0.22
2018–19	31	91	2.94	5	0.61
2019–20	33	115	3.48	2	0.06
2020–21	32	106	3.31	6	0.19
2021–22	16	64	4.00	2	0.13
2022–23	33	141	4.27	3	0.09
2023–24	23	102	4.43	3	0.13
2024–25	22	85	3.86	1	0.05
