= Michael Oliver (referee) =

English football referee (born 1985)

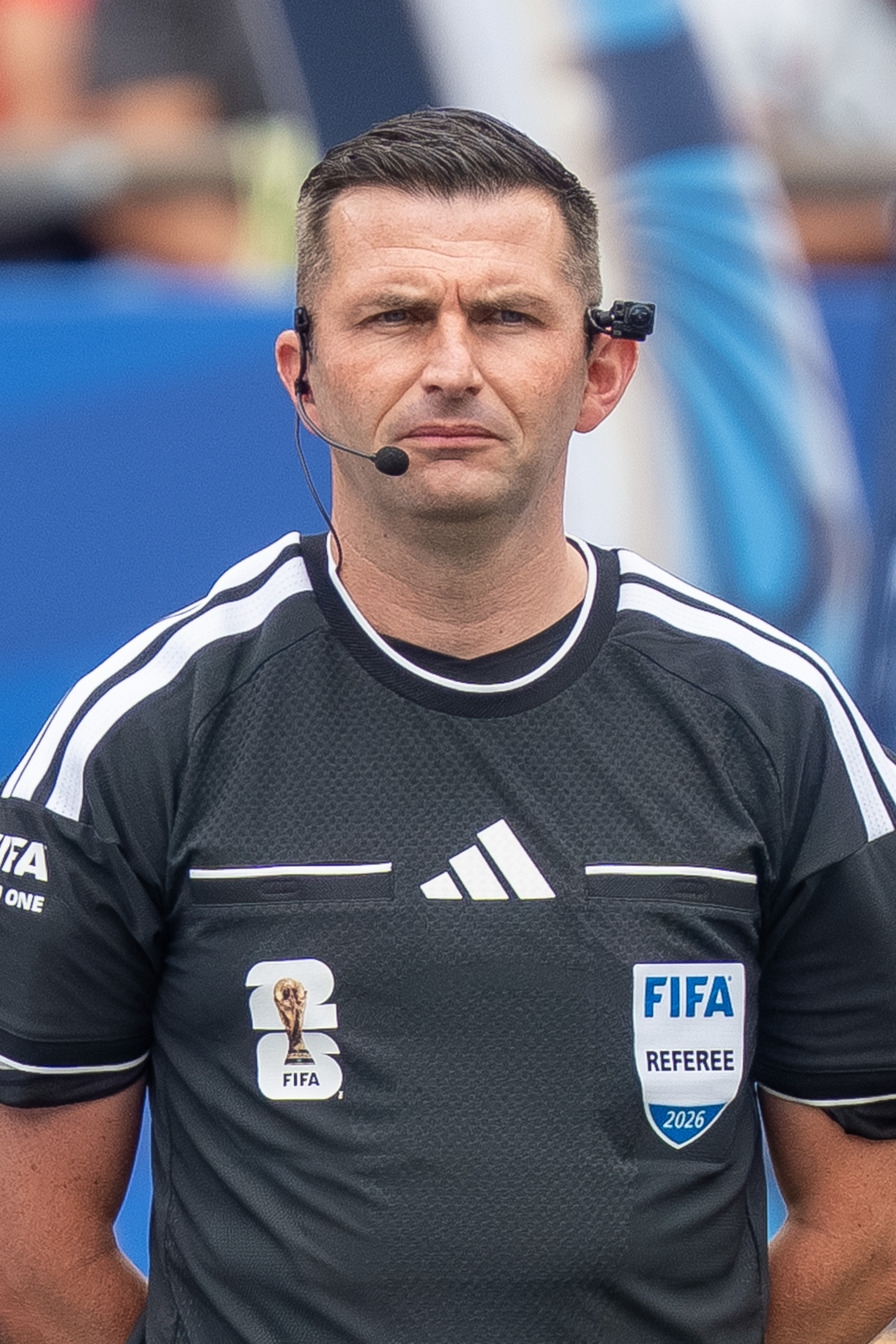
- Oliver in 2026
- Full name: Michael Oliver
- Born: 20 February 1985 (age 41); Ashington, Northumberland, England

Domestic
Years	League	Role
2003–2005	(England) Northern League	Referee
2005–2007	(England) Football Conference	Referee
2007–	(England) English Football League	Referee
2010–	(England) Premier League	Referee

International
Years	League	Role
2012–	FIFA listed	Referee
2018–	UEFA Elite	Referee

Michael Oliver (born 20 February 1985) is an English professional football referee from Ashington, Northumberland. His county FA is the Northumberland Football Association. He belongs to the Select Group of Referees in England and officiates primarily in the Premier League.

He received his FIFA badge in 2012, allowing him to officiate in major international matches. Oliver was appointed to take charge of the final of the 2015 FIFA U-17 World Cup. Oliver was promoted to the UEFA Elite Group of Referees in 2018, and is widely considered one of the best European football referees of his generation.

== Refereeing career ==
Born in Ashington, Northumberland, Oliver was introduced to refereeing by his father, Clive, at the age of 14. He quickly progressed through the ranks and was promoted to the National List of Referees in 2007; he refereed the 2007 Conference National play-off final, becoming the youngest football referee to officiate at Wembley Stadium. In addition he had already become the youngest Football League assistant referee, youngest Football League referee, and would also become the youngest fourth official in the Premier League.

The Oliver family enjoyed a unique refereeing double when father Clive took charge of the 2009 League Two play-off final and Michael officiated the next day at the 2009 League One play-off final. Oliver was set to become the youngest referee in the Premier League when he was appointed to a match between Fulham and Portsmouth in January 2010. However, adverse weather resulted in him having to postpone the match, and an ankle operation later sidelined him until April. He was promoted to the Select Group in August 2010, his first appointment being Birmingham City versus Blackburn Rovers. Oliver was 25 years and 182 days old, breaking Stuart Attwell's record as the youngest-ever Premier League referee.

Oliver was appointed fourth official for the 2013 League Cup final at Wembley Stadium. He refereed the FA Cup semi-final between Wigan Athletic and Millwall in April 2013 and in doing so became the youngest referee to take charge of an FA Cup semi-final. Wigan went on to win the FA Cup and played Manchester United in the subsequent FA Community Shield match in which Oliver was assigned as fourth official.

He was the referee for the 2014 FA Community Shield between Arsenal and Manchester City. The FA Cup holders Arsenal won the match 3–0.

Oliver refereed three group stage matches in the 2016–17 UEFA Champions League, his first being Sporting CP against Legia Warsaw in September 2016.

On 11 April 2018, Oliver refereed the second leg of the 2017–18 UEFA Champions League quarter-final between Real Madrid and Juventus. Real Madrid won the first leg 3–0 in Turin, which meant Juventus would have to win 3–0 in Madrid to take the match to extra time. Juventus led 3–0 until the 93rd minute, when Oliver awarded an injury time penalty to Real Madrid after Medhi Benatia challenged Lucas Vázquez in the box. Juventus players swarmed Oliver, with veteran goalkeeper and captain Gianluigi Buffon at the centre of the confrontation, receiving a red card for dissent. Oliver also issued nine yellow cards during the match. Second goalkeeper Wojciech Szczęsny was forced to be substituted in, with the resulting penalty kick converted by Cristiano Ronaldo in the 98th minute, for a final 4–3 aggregate win for Real Madrid to advance to the semi-final.

11 April 2018 Quarter-final second leg	Real Madrid (Spain)	1–3 (4–3 agg.)	(Italy) Juventus	Madrid, Spain
20:45	Carvajal (yellow card) 22'; Marcelo (yellow card) 81'; Ronaldo 90+8' (pen.), (yellow card) 90+8'	Report	Mandžukić 2', 37', (yellow card) 29'; Pjanić (yellow card) 17'; Lichtsteiner (yellow card) 36'; Matuidi 61'; Alex Sandro (yellow card) 67'; Costa (yellow card) 73'; Benatia (yellow card) 90'; Buffon (red card) 90+3'	Stadium: Santiago Bernabéu; Attendance: 75,796

Several days later, the police investigated threatening text messages sent to Oliver's wife, Lucy, who had her mobile number posted on social media after the game, which led to the abusive texts. They also looked into reports of banging on the front door of their home and shouting abuse through their letterbox. On 11 May, Buffon was charged by UEFA over post-match comments made about referee Oliver, saying in part, "...Clearly you cannot have a heart in your chest, but a bag of rubbish...". Buffon later apologized for his comments. On 5 June, he received a three-match ban for UEFA competition matches.

On 26 March 2019, Oliver was appointed to referee in the 2019 FIFA U-20 World Cup in Poland, with Simon Bennett and Stuart Burt serving as his assistant referees. Oliver officiated 3 matches at the tournament, including a group A clash between Senegal and Colombia, a round of 16 clash between Uruguay and Ecuador, and a semi-final between Ecuador and South Korea.

Oliver officiated the 2021 FA Cup Final on 15 May 2021, between Chelsea and Leicester City.

In a May 2022 FIFA pronouncement, Oliver was listed as one of six English officials to oversee matches at that November and December's World Cup. The list also included referee Anthony Taylor and four compatriot assistant referees—Simon Bennett, Gary Beswick, Stuart Burt, and Adam Nunn.

On 10 August 2022, he was the referee for the 2022 UEFA Super Cup between Eintracht Frankfurt and Real Madrid. On 18 April 2023, he refereed a match between Al Hilal and Al Nassr in the Saudi Pro League. In September 2023, he refereed a match between Sharjah FC and Al Ain FC for the UAE Pro League.

In January 2025, police in the UK launched an investigation after Oliver was subjected to threats following him issuing a controversial red card to Arsenal's Myles Lewis-Skelly during a fixture against Wolverhampton Wanderers. Following the incident, the PGMOL said they were "appalled" by the threats and said "a number of investigations have commenced."

On 1 March 2025 he committed a refereeing error, initially not booking Millwall GK Liam Roberts after the keeper kicked Jean-Philippe Mateta in the face. This caused his removal from the list of PL referees for the following matchday.

Oliver was selected as a referee for the 2026 FIFA World Cup in North America, his second appointment to a World Cup. Oliver refereed four matches in the tournament before he and fellow Premier League referee Anthony Taylor were automatically barred from officiating to prevent a potential conflict of interest after the English team secured a semifinal position with their victory over Norway in the quarterfinals. The last of these matches, the quarterfinal contest between Spain and Belgium, marked his seventh World Cup match and broke the record for the most World Cup matches officiated by an English referee.

== List of refereed domestic finals ==
2014 FA Community Shield
Date	Match	Venue
10 August 2014	Arsenal – Manchester City	Wembley Stadium
2016 Football League Cup final
Date	Match	Venue
28 February 2016	Liverpool – Manchester City	Wembley Stadium
2018 FA Cup final
Date	Match	Venue
19 May 2018	Chelsea – Manchester United	Wembley Stadium
2021 FA Cup final
Date	Match	Venue
15 May 2021	Chelsea – Leicester City	Wembley Stadium

== List of major international club matches refereed ==
Date	Match	Tournament	Venue	Result	Ref
10 August 2022	Real Madrid vs. Eintracht Frankfurt	2022 UEFA Super Cup final	Olympic Stadium, Helsinki	2–0	

== See also ==
- List of football referees

Sporting positions (England) Michael Oliver
Preceded by (Russia) Sergei Karasev	2022 UEFA Super Cup Referee	Succeeded by (France) François Letexier
