= Bobby Madley =

English football referee (born 1985)

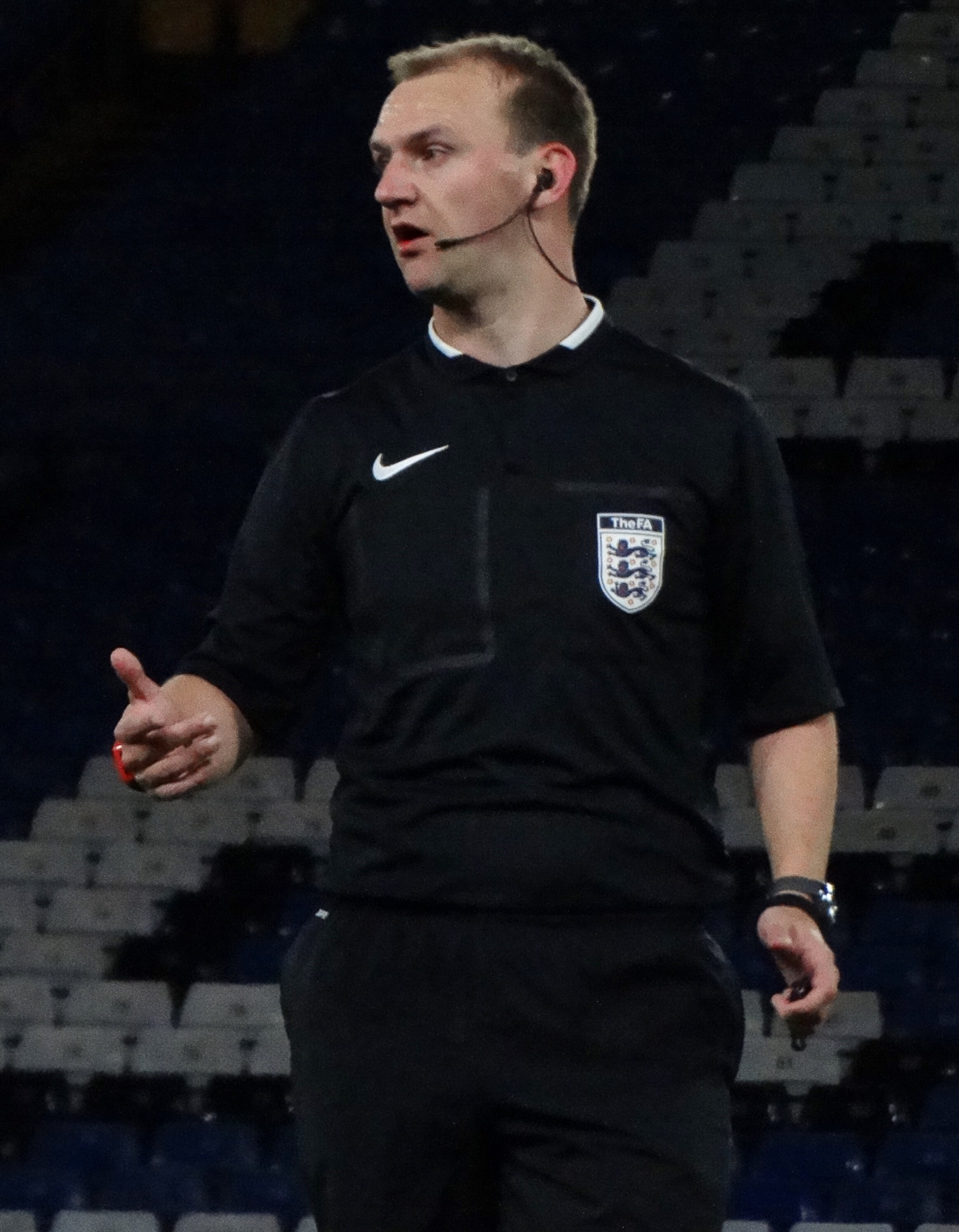
- Full name: Robert Madley
- Born: 6 October 1985 (age 41); Wakefield, West Yorkshire, England

Domestic
Years	League	Role
2010–2018	The Football League	Referee
2013–2018	Premier League	Referee
2020–	The Football League	Referee

International
Years	League	Role
2016–2018	FIFA listed	Referee

Robert Madley (born 6 October 1985) is an English professional football referee who was on the list of Select Group Referees who officiate primarily in the Premier League between 2013 and 2018. He officiated in the Football League as a referee from 2010 and was one of the youngest officials to progress to the top-flight of English football.

Madley was previously one of the referee development officers for the West Riding County Football Association before taking up a full-time role with the Professional Game Match Officials Limited (PGMOL). His older brother, Andrew Madley, is a Premier League and FIFA-listed referee.

== Career ==
In his early career, from 2001, Madley refereed in the Wakefield and District League and then the West Yorkshire Association Football League. In 2010, he joined the National List of referees who officiate in the Football League. In 2012, he was added to the FIFA fifth officials' list.

In April 2013, Madley took charge of his first Premier League fixture, between Southampton and West Bromwich Albion at St Mary's Stadium. He sent off three players during the game, one from each team for violent conduct, and later a second Southampton player for serious foul play. West Brom manager Steve Clarke, whose team won 3–0, said after the game that he thought all three red cards were correct.

In June 2013, Madley was promoted to the panel of Select Group Referees who officiate all fixtures in the Premier League. In April 2015, he was selected to officiate both legs of the FA Youth Cup final between Manchester City and Chelsea. He was promoted to the FIFA referee list in January 2016. On Sunday 6 August 2017, he refereed the FA Community Shield 2017 match between Arsenal and Chelsea.

In the 2017–18 season, Madley was criticised for several decisions by former Premier League referees including Keith Hackett, Graham Poll and Mark Halsey. He quit suddenly in August 2018, when he "decided to relocate due to a change in his personal circumstances", according to a statement by PGMOL. He later revealed, in December 2019, that he recorded a video 'mocking' a disabled person and sent it to a friend who subsequently forwarded it to his employers, for which he was dismissed and left the ranks of PGMOL referees. He subsequently moved to Norway where he officiated in lower league matches.

In 2019, Madley signed on to referee in the 6-a-side World Cup. He refereed the tournament final in Crete, as Russia beat Poland. He also mentored other referees during the tournament. On 13 February 2020, following discussions with PGMOL, it was announced that he would return to refereeing in English football, initially at grassroots level, before joining the National List of referees, enabling him to officiate League One and League Two matches, for the 2020–21 season.

On 25 October 2022, Madley was promoted back to the Premier League after four years. He took charge of Brentford v Wolverhampton Wanderers on Saturday 29 October 2022. He sent off Diego Costa in the seventh minute of added time after a video assistant referee (VAR) check.
