= Neil Swarbrick =

English football referee

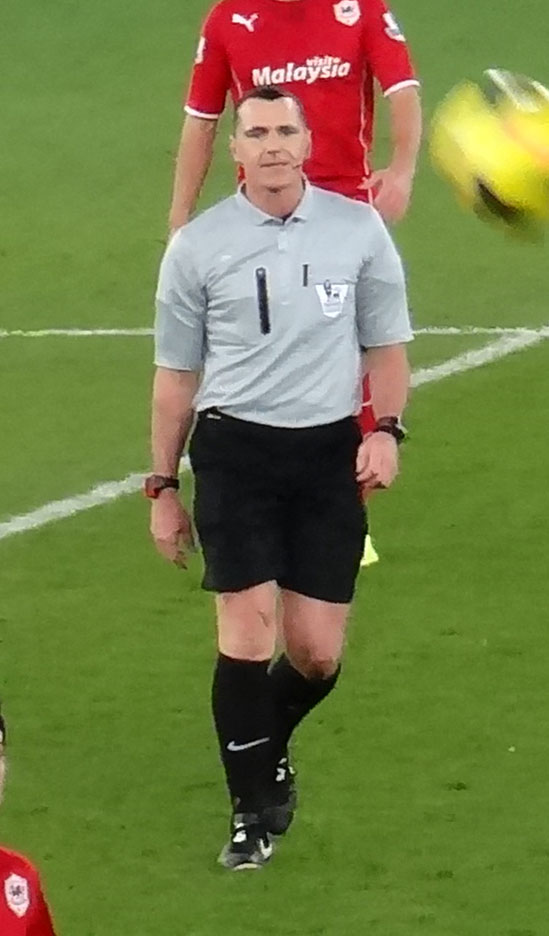
- Swarbrick in 2013
- Born: 20 December 1965 (age 60); Preston, Lancashire, England

Domestic
Years	League	Role
? – ?	Northern Premier League	Referee
? – ?	Conference	Referee
2005–2011	The Football League	Referee
2011–2018	Premier League	Referee

Neil Swarbrick (born 20 December 1965) is an English retired football referee who officiated primarily in the Premier League having been promoted to the Select Group of Referees in 2011.

He is based in Preston, Lancashire, and is a member of the Lancashire County Football Association.

== Career ==
Swarbrick took up refereeing relatively late, at the age of 29. Within six years he was promoted to the National List of assistant referees. He fulfilled this role for four years before being added to the Referees' List.

He refereed in the Football Conference until moving up into the Football League. He has also officiated FA Cup and Football League Cup matches. Swarbrick's first Premier League appointment came in December 2010 when he took charge of a goalless draw between Fulham and Sunderland. During his second Premier League appointment in February 2011 Swarbrick issued his first red card in England's top division, to DJ Campbell of Blackpool as they lost 4–0 away to Wolverhampton Wanderers.

It was announced on 20 June 2011 that Swarbrick had been promoted to the Select Group of Referees who officiate all Premier League fixtures. He joined the Select Group for the 2011/12 season alongside fellow newly promoted official Jonathan Moss.

Swarbrick retired from refereeing at the end of the 2017/18 season however will continue to work and lead the Video Assistant Referee (VAR) in the Premier League. He is Head of Implementation of VAR in the Premier League and is involved in the training of Select Group 1 and Select Group 2 referees to use VAR when it is introduced in the 2019/20 season.

== Controversy ==
=== Referee ===
After a match between Sheffield Wednesday and Aston Villa on 24 February 2018, Swarbrick attracted criticism for his performance. In the game, he awarded 16 fouls to the away side, and only one to home side, which was seen as an unfair imbalance between the two sides. Swarbrick also turned down a penalty appeal for Wednesday, Villa defender John Terry appeared to get away with what looked like a red card offence for a foul on striker Atdhe Nuhiu, and he awarded a questionable late penalty to Villa. His performance was defended by former Premier League referee Roger Dilkes.

=== VAR Referee ===
He has also been involved in some controversies as a VAR referee. One such incident where this was called into question was during the all Premier League FA Cup tie between Brighton and Liverpool. He made another questionable call in the February 2023 Premier League tie between West Ham vs Chelsea missing a blatant handball in the penalty box, which resulted in the PGMOL dropping him from the next round of Premier League games as a VAR referee.

== Statistics ==
Season	Games	Total (yellow card)	(yellow card) per game	Total (red card)	(red card) per game
2005/06	29	57	1.97	2	0.07
2006/07	34	96	2.82	9	0.26
2007/08	38	76	2.00	8	0.21
2008/09	36	82	2.28	4	0.11
2009/10	35	104	2.97	8	0.23
2010/11	40	108	2.70	8	0.20
2011/12	30	107	3.57	7	0.23
2012/13	31	111	3.58	1	0.03
