= Lee Probert =

English football referee (born 1972)

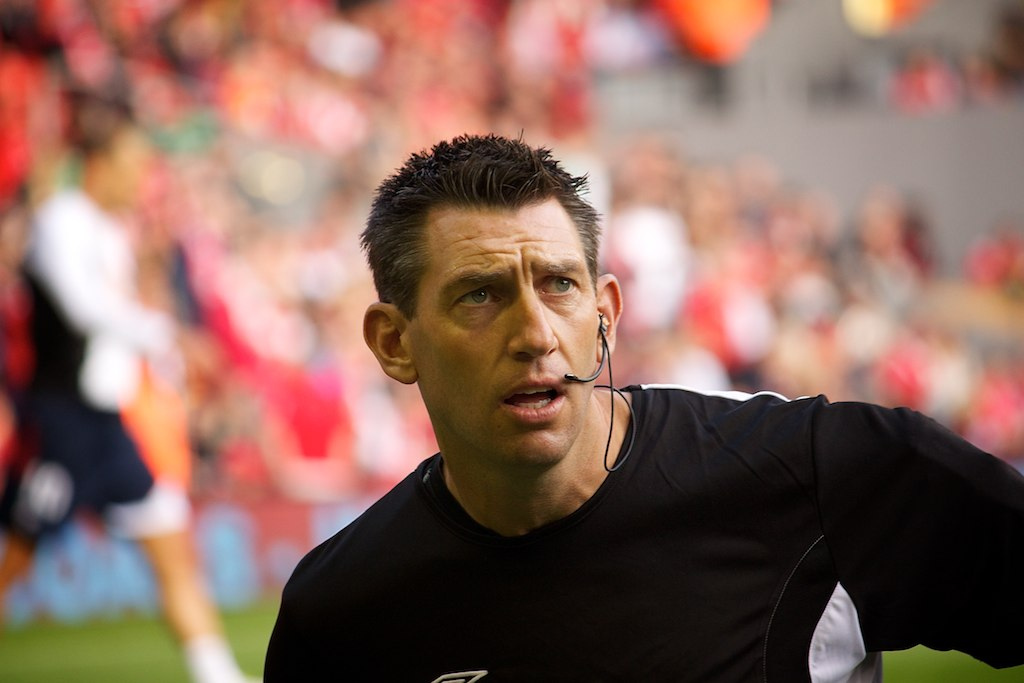
- Probert in 2011
- Full name: Lee William Probert
- Born: 13 August 1972 (age 54); Aylesbury, England

Domestic
Years	League	Role
?-1998	Football Conference South	Referee
1998–2003	Football League	Assistant referee
2003–2007	Football League	Referee
2007–2019	Premier League	Referee

International
Years	League	Role
2010–2016	FIFA listed	Referee (Category 2)

Lee William Probert (born 13 August 1972) is a former English professional football referee who officiated primarily in the Premier League. He was born in Aylesbury but is now based in Dubai and is the Referees Director for the UAE Football Association.

He refereed in the Premier League, the top level in the English football league pyramid, since his promotion to the panel of Select Group Referees in 2007. In 2010, he officiated the FA Trophy final at Wembley Stadium and in 2014 he took charge of the FA Cup final, the highest refereeing honour in England.

== Career ==
=== Early career ===
Probert began refereeing in 1986, in leagues local to Isle of Wight and later in the Football Conference South. He was promoted to the assistant referees' list for the Football League in 1998, and made the step up to full referee five years later.

He refereed his first FA Cup match on 17 November 2001, taking charge of a first-round tie between Dagenham & Redbridge and Southport, which was settled for the home side by a first-half penalty kick.

His first match after elevation to the Football League national list of referees was a League Two encounter in August 2003 between Northampton Town and Torquay United.

In May 2007, Probert refereed a League One play-off semi-final second-leg which saw Blackpool defeat Oldham Athletic 3–1.

=== Professional career ===
In July 2007 a press release from the Professional Game Match Officials Board, which employs Premier League referees full-time, stated that Probert had been included in the Select Group of 19 referees for the 2007–08 season. Prior to this, he had been trialled in the top-tier during the previous season, being appointed a fixture between Sheffield United and Portsmouth in January 2007 which ended in a 1–1 draw.

Probert, as fourth official, and the referee, Mike Dean, were censured after Arsène Wenger was sent to the stands for his reaction, including kicking a plastic bottle, to the ruling-out of an Arsenal goal for offside. The Premier League subsequently issued an apology to Wenger.

In May 2010 Probert was the referee for the FA Trophy final at Wembley Stadium between Barrow and Stevenage Borough.

He was appointed fourth official for the 2011 FA Cup Final between Manchester City and Stoke City.

In May 2014, Probert refereed the FA Cup final at Wembley Stadium between Arsenal and Hull City. Arsenal came back from 2–0 down to win the match 3–2 in extra-time.

Probert missed the whole of the 2015/16 season due to injury. He returned to refereeing in August 2016 but despite remaining a member of the Select Group of Referees he did not take charge of a Premier League fixture until 1 April, 2017, when Watford v Sunderland became his first top flight appointment in almost two years.

In January 2019, Probert refereed a match between Sunderland and Luton Town, awarding a contentious penalty and issuing two red cards, one of which was later overturned on appeal.

In September 2019, Probert announced his retirement from refereeing due to a persistent back injury.

On July 1, 2021, Probert was named Director of Referees at the United Arab Emirates Football Association based in Dubai.

== Statistics ==
Season	Games	Total (yellow card)	(yellow card) per game	Total (red card)	(red card) per game
2001/02	10	33	3.30	1	0.10
2002/03	15	45	3.00	2	0.13
2003/04	28	82	2.93	7	0.25
2004/05	32	94	2.94	7	0.22
2005/06	40	127	3.18	8	0.20
2006/07	38	107	2.82	5	0.13
2007/08	37	82	2.21	3	0.08
2008/09	35	94	2.68	4	0.11
2009/10	33	119	3.61	7	0.21
2010/11	34	88	2.59	6	0.18
2011/12	38	110	2.89	9	0.24
2012/13	34	105	3.09	6	0.18
2013/14	33	59	1.79	5	0.15
2014/15	19	63	3.32	5	0.26
2016/17	31	72	2.32	4	0.13
2017/18	29	57	1.96	5	0.17
2018/19	30	91	3.03	8	0.27
