= Geoff Eltringham =

English football referee

Geoff Eltringham (born 1979) is an English football referee who currently officiates in the English Football League.

== Early life and career ==
He was born in County Durham. Eltringham was appointed on to the English Football League list as an assistant in 2008, and was upgraded to referee in 2009. He made his debut as a referee for the Morecambe F.C. v Hereford United game in League Two on 8 August 2009. He was appointed to the National list of referees for the 2009/10 session. He was appointed to the Select Group Two of referees in 2016.
