= Peter Bankes =

English association football referee

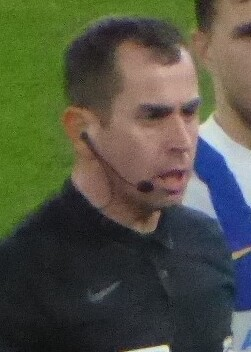
- Bankes in 2022
- Born: 1982 (age 43–44); Lancashire, England

Domestic
Years	League	Role
2014–	The Football League	Referee
2019–	Premier League	Referee

International
Years	League	Role
2021–	FIFA listed	Referee

Peter Bankes (born 1982) is an English professional football referee who officiates primarily in the Premier League. His county FA is the Liverpool Football Association.

== Early life ==
Peter Bankes was born in 1982 in Lancashire.

== Career ==
Bankes start refereeing in 1996 at the age of 14. In 2014, he was appointed to the EFL's refereeing list.

Bankes was moved into Select Group 1 ahead of the 2019–20 campaign after joining Select Group 2 three seasons prior. On 31 August 2019, Bankes refereed his first Premier League game between Leicester City and AFC Bournemouth and issued a total of four yellow cards throughout the game. On 22 February 2020, Bankes showed his first Premier League red card to Newcastle United player Valentino Lazaro after he fouled Crystal Palace forward Wilfried Zaha, who was through on goal.

In 2021, he was promoted to the FIFA refereeing list. However, in 2023, Bankes only appears on the list as a Video Match Official.
