= Andy Davies (referee) =

English football referee and former player

- Born: Hampshire, England
- Other occupation: Professional footballer

Domestic
Years	League	Role
2012–2025	The Football League	Referee

Andy Davies is an English former football referee from Hampshire, known for being the only referee in the EFL who formally played for a football team.

== Career ==
Davies began his career as a professional footballer, and had spells at Gillingham, Portsmouth and Yeovil Town. However, at age 28 he was forced to retire due to injury.

His career as a referee began in the 2004–05 season, and he quickly advanced through the levels, before being promoted to the Football League as a referee in the 2012–13 season. He has since refereed over 200 games for the EFL.

For the start of the 2016–17 season, Davies was included as a Select Group 2 referee, which sees him primarily referee in the Championship, for which he has refereed over 80 games.

== Matches ==
Davies refereed the National League Play-Off Semi-Final between Mansfield Town and York City on 7 May 2012 which ended 0–1 (after extra time). He also refereed an international friendly between England U20 and Mexico U20, which ended 4:2 on penalties.
