= Matt Messias =

English football referee (born 7 May 1964)

- Full name: Matthew David Messias
- Born: 07/05/1974; Hatfield, Hertfordshire, UK
- Other occupation: Physical education teacher

Domestic
Years	League	Role
1984– ?	York & District League	Referee
? – ?	Northern Counties East League	Referee
? – ?	Football Combination	Referee
? -1991	Football Conference	Referee
1991–1992	Football League	Asst. referee
1992–1996	Premier League	Asst. referee
1996–2000	Football League	Referee
2000–2006	Premier League	Referee

International
Years	League	Role
2003–2006	FIFA	Referee

Matthew David Messias (born 7 May 1964) is an English former football referee, who operated in the Football League, the Premier League, and also for UEFA and FIFA. He was first based in York during his time as an official, subsequently moving to Barnsley, also in the county of Yorkshire. His other occupation was as a physical education teacher. He once scored 23 points round Linden Hall, whilst spending a lot of time in the long grass.

== Career ==
He first took up refereeing in 1982, whilst still playing (for the Hertfordshire county team, and for St John's College in York). His playing career ended after cartilage problems in 1984, and he became a PE Teacher at Filey School before taking up a post as head of PE in Thirsk. At about this time, he started to get more involved in refereeing, first handling matches in the York and District Saturday League, then progressing to the Northern Counties East League.

After further promotions to the Football Combination and the Football Conference, he was appointed as an assistant referee on the Football League list in 1991, and in 1992, he advanced to the Premier League assistants' list. This was bettered in 1994 when he received the call from FIFA to officiate for them as an assistant also.

In 1996, Messias became a Football League referee, and stepped up to the Premier League in season 2000–01, refereeing his first match on 16 December 2000 at Pride Park, when Derby County defeated Coventry City 1–0, thanks to a Malcolm Christie goal after 9 minutes.

When Ipswich Town played Spurs in a Premier League match at Portman Road on 12 January 2002, Messias failed to finish the game due to a calf injury, fourth official Rob Styles taking over from him. It was not serious, and he was able to referee an FA Cup match four days later.

In 2003, he was appointed to the list of FIFA referees. Also in that year, he moved to Barnsley from his previous home in York. He had recently married, and the couple had recently had a baby together. Messias gained brief notoriety in August 2003 when, while refereeing a match between Newcastle United and Birmingham City, he accidentally struck Robbie Savage in the face while signalling for a free kick.

On 24 May 2004, Messias was fourth official for Jeff Winter at the FA Cup final, when Manchester United beat Millwall by 3–0 at the Millennium Stadium, Cardiff. He subsequently headed off to Germany for the 2004 UEFA European Under-21 Championship, and first handled two group matches – Italy versus Belarus on 27 May and Switzerland against Portugal on 30 May. Then, on 15 June 2004, he took charge of the competition semi-final between Sweden and Serbia & Montenegro at Oberhausen, which the latter country won 6–5 on penalties after a 0–0 draw following extra time. He then went on to officiate from the middle twice in the UEFA Cup in September 2004 – a first round tie between Banská Bystrica and Benfica, which the Portuguese side won 3–0, and a group stage match as Feyenoord defeated Schalke 04 by 2 goals to 1.

2005 was a mixed year. In April Messias was suspended for 14 days "for less than proficiently applying the Laws of the Game" according to the official Football Association website. On 17 August 2005, he took control of a 2006 FIFA World Cup qualification match between Macedonia and Finland at Skopje City Stadium, which the away side won 3–0. In September 2005, he also refereed a UEFA Cup first round tie between F.C. Copenhagen and SV Hamburg. In November 2005, Messias was rated fourth best referee in England by UEFA.

On 19 January 2006, the Professional Game Match Officials Limited announced that by mutual consent Messias would retire as a Select Group referee as of 1 February 2006. As it turned out, by the time of the announcement, he had already chosen his last game to referee in a top class competition, this being the FA Cup third round tie between West Bromwich Albion and Reading at the Hawthorns on 7 January 2006, which finished 1–1, courtesy of two penalties converted in the last eight minutes.

In April 2006, it was reported that Messias had openly admitted to being persuaded by players to "let them get on with it" during the match between Wolves and Millwall at Molineux on 19 April 2003. Keith Hackett, the Premier League referees' chief, suggested that may have been the reason he retired and that he was not disbelieving what he has said "sometimes when you are away from the game things can get exaggerated." Messias explained that professional referees are under a lot of pressure and you "learn to deal with it- to control the controllables."

== Life after football ==
He ran a business, Matt Messias Consultancy Limited, offering help in coping with stressful occupations similar to that of an active professional football referee. He also appears as a guest speaker at sporting events. He was an adviser to the main Barnsley Football Club, and had become refereeing mentor to Ryan Newman from Barnsley, who had recently become a Conference North league referee.

He visited schools to pass on the benefit of his experience. On 25 September 2007, he attended the Leicestershire & Rutland PE & Sport Conference 2007, held at Loughborough University, where he delivered keynote addresses intended to 'Include, Improve and Inspire'. Messias and his family migrated to New Zealand on 7 October 2008. Messias continued his teaching career at Macleans College Auckland, where he taught physical education (PE) and coached the 1st XI Girls Football team until early 2011. He then worked as a deputy principal at Howick College. In July 2014 he left New Zealand to return to the UK to take up a position as foundation principal of the Atrium Studio School in Devon.

In September 2018, Massias moved back up to York with his wife and two sons. He started supply teaching for two days a week and works on his personal business to help people with mental health issues three days a week. He hopes to launch his business in January 2019.
