= Martin Atkinson =

English football referee (born 1971)

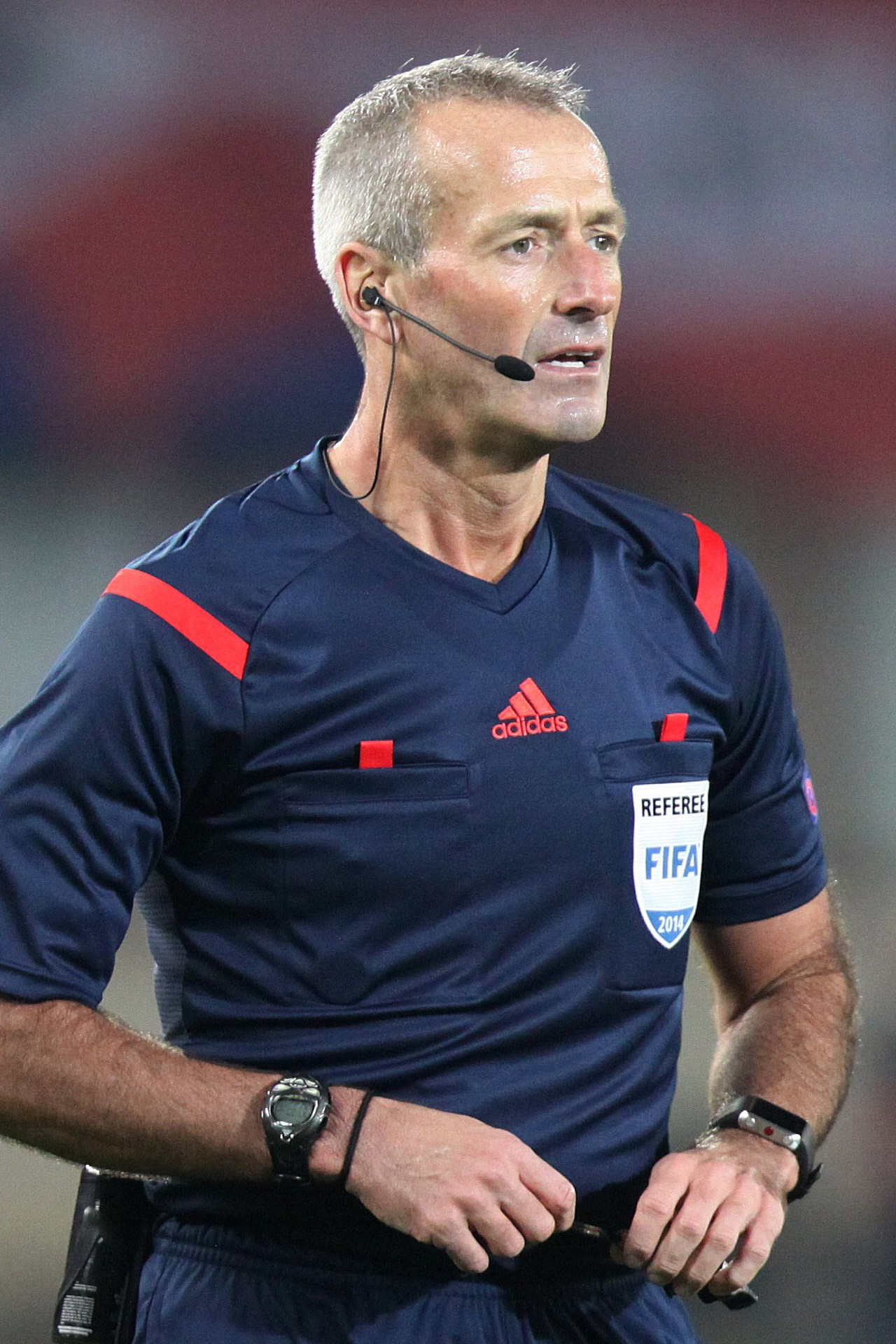
- Atkinson in 2014
- Full name: Martin Atkinson
- Born: 31 March 1971 (age 55); Drighlington, West Riding of Yorkshire, (Note: 'West Yorkshire' did not exist before 1 April 1974. 'West Riding of Yorkshire' is correct) England
- Other occupation: Teacher

Domestic
Years	League	Role
1998–2000	(England) Football League	Assistant referee
2000–2003	(England) Premier League	Assistant referee
2002–2003	(England) Football Conference	Referee
2003–2005	(England) Football League	Referee
2005–2022	(England) Premier League	Referee
2022–present	(England) Premier League	Referee coach

International
Years	League	Role
2006–2018	FIFA listed	Referee

Martin Atkinson (born 31 March 1971) is an English referee coach and former professional football referee who officiated primarily in the Premier League. He is a member of the West Riding County Football Association.

Atkinson made his first appearance as an official in the Football League as an assistant referee in 1995. Since he was promoted to the list of Select Group Referees in 2004 he refereed a number of notable matches, including the FA Community Shield and the finals of the FA Trophy, Football League Cup, FA Cup and UEFA Europa League. Atkinson retired from field duties at the end of the 2021–22 season and will coach the select group one referees for Premier League in the 2022–23 season.

== Career ==
Atkinson started his refereeing career at the relatively early age of 16 years, as the local team did not have a referee to oversee matches. By 1998, he had been promoted to the Football League's list of assistant referees.

This was followed in 2000 by promotion to the Select Group of assistant referees. By December 2002 he was refereeing Football Conference matches, and also refereed the 2003 FA County Youth Cup final.

At the start of the 2003–04 season, Atkinson joined the national list of referees. He had the distinction of not sending off any player from the field of play between August 2004 and October 2005.

Atkinson made his Premier League officiating debut on 18 September 2004 in a match between Crystal Palace and Manchester City.

During the three seasons between 2003 and 2006, Atkinson issued only eight red cards in 102 matches, an average of less than 0.08 per game.

In 2006 Atkinson was appointed to the list of FIFA referees.

The 2009–10 season saw Atkinson referee 48 matches in English football, his highest tally of appointments in one season to date.

In September 2010, Atkinson was handed a one-week demotion to the role of fourth official after a time-keeping dispute with Everton manager David Moyes. Everton had scored two injury-time goals to make the score 3–3 against Manchester United, but Atkinson then blew his final whistle while Everton were midway through an attack with a chance of a winner.

On 22 May 2022, Atkinson was in charge of his final Premier league match, between Crystal Palace and Manchester United at Selhurst Park, which also happens to be the ground he made his debut 17 years ago. At the time of his retirement, he had refereed 462 games in the Premier league, which is second highest in the competition, after Mike Dean's 560.

=== 2006 FA Community Shield ===
Atkinson refereed the 2006 FA Community Shield match at the Millennium Stadium in Cardiff. Liverpool defeated Chelsea 2–1, with Atkinson issuing four yellow cards during the course of the game.

13 August 2006

Chelsea	1–2	Liverpool
Shevchenko 44'; Ballack (yellow card) 7'; Lampard (yellow card) 15'; Diarra (yellow card) 68'	(Report)	Riise 9'; Crouch 80'; Alonso (yellow card) 61'

Millennium Stadium, Cardiff
Attendance: 56,275

=== 2008 FA Trophy final ===
Atkinson was appointed to referee the 2008 FA Trophy Final at Wembley Stadium, which was contested between Ebbsfleet United and Torquay United.

10 May 2008
14:30

Ebbsfleet United	1–0	Torquay United
McPhee 45'; Smith (yellow card); McCarthy (yellow card); Moore (yellow card)	(Report)	Rice (yellow card)

Wembley Stadium, London
Attendance: 40,186

=== 2011 FA Cup final ===
Atkinson was appointed to officiate the 2011 FA Cup final. Manchester City defeated Stoke City 1–0; Atkinson issued two yellow cards to two Stoke players during the match.

14 May 2011
15:00

Manchester City	1–0	Stoke City
Y. Touré 74'	Report	Wilkinson (yellow card) 76'; Huth (yellow card) 40'

Wembley Stadium, London
Attendance: 88,643

=== 2014 Football League Cup final ===
Atkinson refereed the 2014 Football League Cup final between Manchester City and Sunderland. City won the match 3–1 and Atkinson cautioned two players, both late in the second half.

2 March 2014
14:00

Manchester City	3–1	Sunderland
Touré 55'; Nasri 56'; Navas 90'; Negredo (yellow card) 90'	Report	Borini 10'; Alonso (yellow card) 90'

Wembley Stadium, London
Attendance: 84,697

=== Europe and international ===
On 13 October 2007, Atkinson refereed a group C qualifier for Euro 2008 between Moldova and Turkey. The game in the Moldovan capital Chişinău ended a 1–1 draw, with the referee showing two yellow cards.

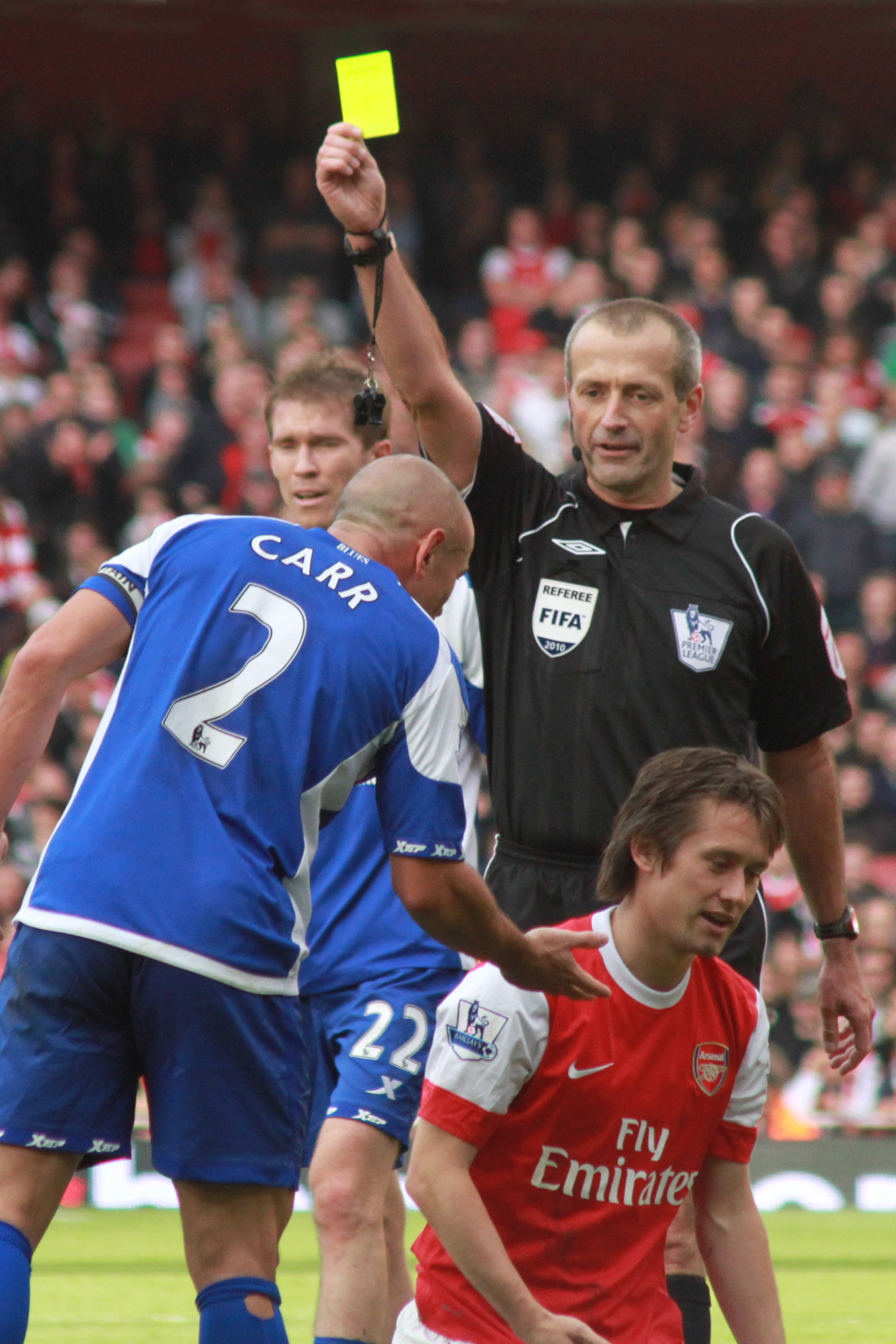
Atkinson issues a yellow card during a fixture between Birmingham City and Arsenal in 2010

The 2008–09 season was the first that Atkinson took charge of UEFA Champions League games. That season he refereed four matches, including FC Zürich against Real Madrid and Inter Milan versus Dynamo Kyiv. In 2010 Atkinson was fourth official to Howard Webb for the Champions League final in Madrid. He issued his first Champions League red card on 5 April 2011, to Cristian Chivu of Inter Milan as they lost 5–2 at home to Schalke.

Atkinson officiated multiple matches during 2010 FIFA World Cup Qualification, including the UEFA group 4 qualifying game between Germany and Finland in Hamburg on 14 October 2009 which ended 1–1. One month later, he officiated Portugal's 1–0 qualifying win over Bosnia and Herzegovina.

He officiated at Euro 2012 as an additional assistant referee in a team with referee Howard Webb.

The referee abandoned a Euro 2016 qualifying match in Belgrade between Serbia and Albania on 14 October 2014 when violence on the pitch and crowd disturbances broke out after a quadcopter was flown over the pitch bearing a flag of Greater Albania.

On 27 May 2015, Atkinson was in charge of the 2015 UEFA Europa League Final between Sevilla and Dnipro. Seville won 3-2 and defended their title.

Atkinson refereed 3 games at Euro 2016: Germany v Ukraine and Hungary v Portugal at group stage, as well as a round of 16 game between Wales and Northern Ireland.

With no English officials being selected for the 2018 World Cup, the first time since 1938, Atkinson refereed his last international match in March 2018, a friendly between Argentina and Italy at the Etihad Stadium in Manchester. Atkinson would referee the Manchester Derby at the same stadium less than a month later, a performance that was criticised by former Premier League referee Keith Hackett who stated "if you want proof of why no English referee will be represented at this summer’s World Cup finals in Russia, look no further than Martin Atkinson’s performance at the Etihad on Saturday."

== Personal life ==
Atkinson was born in Drighlington, West Riding of Yorkshire, but is now based near Leeds.

== Statistics ==
Season	Games	Total (yellow card)	(yellow card) per game	Total (red card)	(red card) per game
2002–03	9	28	3.11	3	0.33
2003–04	26	61	2.34	3	0.11
2004–05	38	87	2.28	3	0.07
2005–06	38	78	2.05	2	0.05
2006–07	42	128	3.04	6	0.14
2007–08	42	109	2.60	6	0.14
2008–09	40	135	3.38	11	0.28
2009–10	48	187	3.90	6	0.13
2010–11	41	143	3.49	13	0.32
2011–12	40	146	3.65	11	0.28
2012–13	36	133	3.69	1	0.03
2013–14	39	118	3.03	3	0.08
2014–15	48	193	4.02	11	0.23
2015–16	46	169	3.67	1	0.02
2016–17	43	146	3.40	3	0.07
2017–18	33	118	3.58	5	0.15
2018–19	34	110	3.24	2	0.06
2019–20	36	110	3.06	5	0.14
2020–21	30	71	2.37	2	0.07
2021–22	28	75	2.68	3	0.11
Total	737	2345	3.18	100	0.14

Statistics for all competitions. No records are available prior to 2002–03.

== Notes ==
Preceded by Howard Webb	FA Community Shield referee 2006	Succeeded by Mark Halsey
Preceded by Chris Foy	FA Trophy Final referee 2008	Succeeded by Michael Jones
Preceded by Chris Foy	FA Cup Final referee 2011	Succeeded by Phil Dowd
Preceded by Felix Brych	UEFA Europa League Final referee 2015	Succeeded by Jonas Eriksson
