= Chris Foy =

English football referee (born 1962)

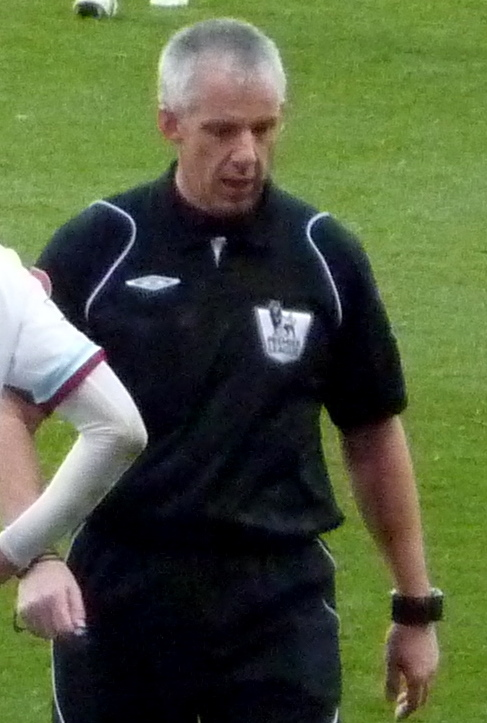
- Full name: Christopher Foy
- Born: 20 November 1962 (age 63); St. Helens, Lancashire, England

Domestic
Years	League	Role
1994–95	The Football League	Assistant referee
1995–96	Premier League	Assistant referee
1996–2001	The Football League	Referee
2001–2015	Premier League	Referee

International
Years	League	Role
2002–07	FIFA listed	Referee

Christopher Foy (born 20 November 1962) is an English retired professional football referee. Following his first appointment as an official in the Football League in 1994 and his promotion in 2001 to the list of Select Group Referees who officiate in the Premier League, Foy refereed a number of notable matches, including the FA Community Shield and the finals of the FA Cup, Football League Cup and FA Trophy.

In 2015 Foy retired to become a senior referees' coach for the Professional Game Match Officials Board.

== Career ==
Foy was born in St. Helens, Lancashire, and first started refereeing in 1983. In 1994, he was promoted to the Football League list of assistant referees and progressed to the Premier League assistant referees' list in 1995.

He made the step up to the role of referee in the Football League in 1996 and became a Premier League referee in 2001, his first appointment being a 0–0 draw between Bolton Wanderers and Charlton Athletic in December 2001. Earlier in that year Foy was appointed fourth official for the FA Trophy final at Villa Park, where Canvey Island defeated Forest Green Rovers 1–0.

He was also fourth official during the international friendly match when England lost 2–1 to Italy at Elland Road in March 2002, and in May 2006 for the Football League Championship play-off between Leeds United and Watford, the latter winning 3–0.

Nine days after the Championship play-off he was fourth official again when England played Hungary at Old Trafford, the home team winning 3–1. Foy subsequently retired from international activities at the compulsory age of 45 in 2007.

In 2007, he was selected to referee the FA Trophy final at Wembley Stadium between Stevenage Borough and Kidderminster Harriers. The match was won 3–2 by Stevenage, with Foy issuing four yellow cards.

In 2008 Foy was chosen to carry out fourth official duties at the FA Cup final between Portsmouth and Cardiff City at Wembley Stadium, with Mike Dean refereeing.

Foy refereed the 2009 Football League Cup Final between Manchester United and Tottenham Hotspur, with United securing victory on penalties after a goalless draw. He also took charge of the 2009 FA Community Shield later that year, contested by Chelsea and Manchester United, with Chelsea winning 4–1 on penalties after extra-time finished 2–2.

Foy's highest refereeing honour was to officiate the FA Cup final in 2010, won 1–0 by Chelsea and during which he issued three cautions to Portsmouth players and awarded Portsmouth a penalty kick which was missed by Kevin-Prince Boateng four minutes prior to Didier Drogba's winning goal.

Foy retired from professional refereeing at the end of the 2014–15 season to become a senior referees' coach for the Professional Game Match Officials Board, working under Howard Webb.

== Personal life ==
As an Everton fan, Foy did not referee competitive games involving that club, although he did take charge of an Everton away game at Aston Villa in 2002 before he had declared his interest in the team.

Foy was actively involved in the "Don't X The Line" campaign to eradicate abusive or aggressive behaviour from players and spectators at junior and youth matches. He has also supported Knowsley Housing Trust's "Give Rent Arrears the Red Card".

== Statistics ==
Season	Games	Total (yellow card)	(yellow card) per game	Total (red card)	(red card) per game
1997-98	41	106	2.59	6	0.15
1998-99	40	91	2.28	4	0.10
1999-00	34	101	2.97	7	0.21
2000-01	34	116	3.41	8	0.24
2001-02	30	100	3.34	9	0.30
2002-03	18	78	4.34	5	0.28
2003-04	23	68	2.96	4	0.17
2004-05	28	53	1.89	1	0.04
2005-06	43	103	2.40	10	0.23
2006-07	41	111	2.71	7	0.17
2007-08	34	99	2.91	6	0.17
2008-09	36	117	3.25	3	0.08
2009-10	36	107	2.97	5	0.14
2010-11	34	89	2.62	4	0.12
2011-12	35	86	2.46	8	0.23
2012-13	31	64	2.06	2	0.06
2013-14	32	89	2.78	6	0.19
Total	570	1,578	2.77	95	0.17

There are no available records prior to 1997–98.

Preceded by Howard Webb	FA Trophy Final; 2007	Succeeded by Martin Atkinson
Preceded by Mark Halsey	League Cup Final; 2009	Succeeded by Phil Dowd
Preceded by Howard Webb	FA Cup Final; 2010	Succeeded by Martin Atkinson
