= Mark Halsey =

English football referee (born 1961)

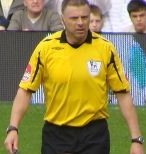
- Born: 8 July 1961 (age 65); Welwyn Garden City, Hertfordshire, England

Domestic
| Years | League | Role |
| Mid-1990s – 1999 | The Football League | Referee |
| 1999–2013 | Premier League | Referee |

International
| Years | League | Role |
| 2000–2006 | FIFA listed | Referee |

Mark R. Halsey (born 8 July 1961) is an English retired professional football referee who was born in Welwyn Garden City, Hertfordshire, later based in Bolton, Lancashire. Halsey primarily refereed in the Premier League from 1999 to 2013 and was on the league's list of Select Group Referees from its creation in 2001 until his retirement.

His first Premier League appointment was a fixture between Wimbledon and Coventry City in August 1999 and over the course of his professional career he refereed a number of notable matches, including the FA Community Shield in 2007 and the 2008 final of the Football League Cup.

In 2009 Halsey underwent chemotherapy to treat a cancerous tumour in his throat. He returned to refereeing in the top flight in 2010. He announced his retirement at the end of the 2012–13 season.

== Career ==
=== Early career ===
Halsey spent 12 years playing non-League football as a goalkeeper with teams such as Cambridge City and Hertford Town before he started refereeing in 1989. In December 1984 he played one game for Barnet before joining St Albans City.

Halsey was a National List referee for the Football League from the mid-1990s until 1999. He refereed the 1999 Second Division play-off final between Gillingham and Manchester City at Wembley Stadium, which City won 3–1 on penalties (the match having finishing 2–2 after extra time).

=== Select Group and FIFA lists ===
In 1999 Halsey was promoted to become a Premier League referee, his first appointment being a 1–1 draw in August of that year between Wimbledon and Coventry City.

In 2000, Halsey was added to the FIFA list of referees, officiating in the Toulon Tournament of that year. In 2001, he was a referee for the football tournament at the World Student Games in Beijing and in 2002 at the FIFA World Disabled Championships, held in Japan.

Also in 2002, he was appointed as fourth official to Mike Riley for the FA Cup final at the Millennium Stadium, where Arsenal defeated Chelsea 2–0.

Halsey's first major FIFA appointment came in 2004 when he refereed a friendly match between Belgium and France in Brussels.

In August 2007 Halsey took charge of the FA Community Shield match between Manchester United and Chelsea at Wembley Stadium. After the game finished 1–1 after extra-time, the Premier League title holders United defeated FA Cup holders Chelsea 3–0 on penalties.

In 2008 Halsey was appointed to referee the League Cup final between Tottenham Hotspur and Chelsea, with the former side winning the match 2–1 after extra-time.

=== Cancer treatment and return to refereeing ===
In August 2009 Halsey announced he had been diagnosed with a non-Hodgkin lymphoma and had undergone surgery to remove a cancerous tumour in his throat. The news came months after Halsey's wife was diagnosed with leukaemia; she will require drugs courses for the rest of her life to treat the disease. Halsey relinquished his refereeing duties during his treatment, which included fortnightly chemotherapy and courses of radiation.

In March 2010 Halsey passed a referees' fitness test. His first game back after his treatment was Leicester City's reserves team versus Scunthorpe United's reserves. He was due to referee a League Two match between Accrington Stanley and Barnet on 30 March 2010, however it was postponed because of a waterlogged pitch. He returned to oversee another League Two fixture, between Rotherham United and Port Vale, a few days later. On 9 August 2010, following his officiating of a friendly at Everton, it was confirmed that Halsey was to return to the Premier League starting with the opening-day fixture, five days later, between Wigan Athletic and Blackpool.

=== Later years and retirement ===
In September 2012, Halsey made a formal complaint to the police after two abusive messages were posted to him on Twitter that referred to his treatment for cancer. The messages were sent following a fixture between Liverpool and Manchester United in which Halsey sent-off Liverpool's Jonjo Shelvey and awarded United a late penalty kick to win the match 2–1. A man from Liverpool was ultimately cautioned by police over the messages.

Halsey announced his retirement from refereeing at the end of the 2012–13 season; his final game was a Premier League fixture between Manchester City versus Norwich City on 19 May 2013, which finished 3–2 to visitors Norwich. The crowd at the game gave Halsey what he described as a "great reception" and added that he hoped his comeback after his illness had been an "inspiration" to other cancer sufferers.

He subsequently joined the pundit crew on BT Sport's television coverage to provide analysis of refereeing decisions during Premier League matches and now writes a regular column for caughtoffside.com. Mark is a QPR supporter and as such did not officiate QPR matches. He stated on the Under The Cosh podcast that he had in fact officiated two QPR games, before the rules were changed.

== Statistics ==
| Season | Games | Total (yellow card) | (yellow card) per game | Total (red card) | (red card) per game |
|---|---|---|---|---|---|
| 1997–98 | 42 | 161 | 3.83 | 5 | 0.11 |
| 1998–99 | 46 | 111 | 2.41 | 2 | 0.04 |
| 1999–2000 | 38 | 96 | 2.52 | 8 | 0.21 |
| 2000–01 | 33 | 101 | 3.06 | 10 | 0.30 |
| 2001–02 | 37 | 118 | 3.18 | 7 | 0.18 |
| 2002–03 | 34 | 75 | 2.20 | 6 | 0.17 |
| 2003–04 | 41 | 81 | 1.97 | 5 | 0.12 |
| 2004–05 | 32 | 60 | 1.87 | 2 | 0.06 |
| 2005–06 | 38 | 54 | 1.42 | 6 | 0.15 |
| 2006–07 | 42 | 103 | 2.45 | 9 | 0.21 |
| 2007–08 | 41 | 86 | 2.09 | 5 | 0.12 |
| 2008–09 | 44 | 73 | 1.65 | 3 | 0.06 |
| 2009–10 | 6 | 8 | 1.33 | 0 | 0.00 |
| 2010–11 | 34 | 68 | 2.00 | 1 | 0.03 |
| 2011–12 | 33 | 75 | 2.27 | 0 | 0.00 |
| 2012–13 | 30 | 62 | 2.07 | 3 | 0.10 |

Statistics are for all competitions. There are no available records prior to 1997–98.

== See also ==
- List of football referees

| Preceded by Martin Atkinson | FA Community Shield; 2007 | Succeeded by Peter Walton |
| Preceded by Howard Webb | League Cup Final; 2008 | Succeeded by Chris Foy |
