= Professional Game Referees =

English football organisation

Professional Game Referees (Pro Ref) is the body responsible for refereeing games in English professional association football.

Initially known as Professional Game Match Officials Board (PGMOB), and then later Professional Game Match Officials Limited (PGMOL), Pro Ref was formed when English referees became professional in 2001, to provide officials for all games played in the Premier League, English Football League (EFL) and Football Association (FA) competitions. In doing so, England became the first country in the world to fully professionalise its referees. The organisation is a "not-for-profit" company limited by guarantee owned and funded by the Premier League, EFL, and the FA.

== Leadership team ==
Employee	Title
Martin Glenn	Chairman
Howard Webb	Chief Refereeing Officer
Danielle Every	Chief Operating Officer
Hugh Dallas	Professional Referee Group Director
Adam Gale-Watts	Technical Director
Mike Jones	National Referee Group Director
Rebecca Welch	Women’s Pro Game Group Director
Steve McNally	Performance Support Director
Wayne Allison	Coaching Director
Dan Meeson	Development Director
Kevin Friend	Professional Referee Group Manager
Cheryl Foster	Manager - Women’s Professional Game Group
Simon Breivik	Head of Physical Performance
Tom Goodall	Head of Performance Psychology
Mike Mullarkey	Head of Assistant Referees
Chris Foy	Head of Community and Public Engagement

== Evaluation ==
Referees meet twice per month for training sessions and analysis of match videos and data.

Pro Ref have their own sports scientists, sports psychologists, physiotherapists, sprint coaches, podiatrists and vision scientists which mirror football clubs to help improve referee performance.

Every Premier League match is evaluated by a former senior referee to measure the referee's technical performance, along with fellow players and managers (match delegates) who assess accuracy and consistency of their decision making and management of their game to ensure the correct result. Pro Ref no longer sends evaluators to the match, instead relying solely on video analysis. Some referees in the Select Group have criticized this system, believing it misses critical environmental considerations in game management.

== Sponsorship ==
The PGMOL changed its sponsorship for the 2010–11 season from Air Asia to its parent group.

For the 2012–13 season Expedia sponsored the officials, but this agreement ended after a year.

For the start of the 2013–14 Premier League season PGMOL had no sponsor, but part way through the season EA Sports signed a long term agreement which saw their logo on the arms of all officials in the Premier League and EFL until 2019. In 2022, the sponsorship was renewed until the end of the 2024–25 season. Beginning with the 2025-26 season, PGMOL referees are sponsored by the Huws Gray chain of builders merchants.

== Controversies ==
=== Mark Halsey claim ===
In September 2016, Mark Halsey, a former member and referee, claimed that PGMOL asked him to lie in match reports. PGMOL denied the claim, and no further action was taken.

=== Employment status ===
In 2018, HMRC challenged the employment status of PGMOL appointed referees. The tax authority claimed that referees are employees, not self-employed as PGMOL claimed. The tax tribunals sided with HMRC, but the appellate court reversed, determining that their referees are self-employed. The Supreme Court of the United Kingdom determined the referees' contract satisfied the standards for an employment contract and remanded the case for further findings of fact.

=== Implementation of Video Assistant Referees ===
Howard Webb acknowledged the turbulent implementation of Video Assistant Referees (VAR) after he became PGMOL's Chief. He stated that his goal is increased transparency in the VAR process. Such measures includes the introduction of an independent panel consisting of three players, a representative from the Premier League and a PGMOL official to evaluate VAR's performance during the 2022–23 season. The panel found six errors out of 48 decisions in the months before the 2022 FIFA World Cup break. The same panel found just four incorrect interventions in the latter half of the season. In the 2023–24 season, Webb consented to releasing the audio between VAR and on pitch officials for key and controversial calls in a regular TV programme, "Match Officials Mic'd Up". The show airs at the end of every month and features Howard Webb and former footballer Michael Owen discussing the process and addressing errors made by officials for the previous four match weeks. This is an expansion on the special release of VAR audio to address an error made by VAR during the September 30, 2023, match between Liverpool and Tottenham Hotspur.

=== David Coote controversy ===
On 11 November 2024, PGMOL suspended referee David Coote after video footage with Ben Kitt emerged in which he made derogatory comments about Liverpool and described Jürgen Klopp as an arrogant "German cunt". According to The Guardian, the "video appears to date from the 2020–21 season". During that season, Coote was the video assistant referee for the Merseyside derby between Liverpool and Everton at Goodison on 17 October, a game which saw Everton goalkeeper Jordan Pickford go unpunished for what TNT Sports called "a horror tackle" on Liverpool defender Virgil van Dijk which resulted in a season-ending injury. Having watched the video, Coote did not call for any action on Pickford, instead focusing on a marginal offside in the buildup to the collision. Coote initially claimed the video was not real, however he later admitted that it was genuine. The Football Association subsequently launched its own investigation into the video due to a potential breach of rule E3.

=== Accusations of conflict of interest ===
PGMOL allowed top referees to moonlight as match officials in nation states such as UAE and Saudi Arabia (who own teams in the Premier League directly or indirectly). The PGMOL banned its referees from taking these side jobs in September 2024.

=== Apologies and acknowledgements of error ===
Date	Favored Team	Disfavored Team	Nature of the Call	Nature of the Mistake	PGMOL Action
22 February 2020	Tottenham Hotspur	Chelsea	Red card not awarded	VAR did not think the challenge was avoidable.	PGMOL Head of Public Engagement Chris Foy attribute mistake to "human error by video officials"
17 October 2020	Everton	Liverpool	Red card not awarded	All officials failed to consider all possible sanctions for the conduct.	Head Official Michael Oliver acknowledged that Jordan Pickford should have been sent off for "serious foul play or violent conduct" regardless of how the game resumed otherwise.
26 February 2022	Manchester City	Everton	Penalty not awarded for handling	VAR deemed insufficient evidence of contact	PGMOL Referees Chief Mike Riley issued an apology to Everton.
6 November 2022	Aston Villa	Manchester United	Excessive wall distance on free kick	Head official over-measured the wall distance and ignored the complaints of players.	PGMOL Select Group 1 Manager Jon Moss assured the centre official would be spoken to.
7 January 2023	Liverpool	Wolverhampton Wanderers	Onside goal disallowed	VAR did not have access to appropriate camera angles	The centre official allowed the coach to discuss the error before normal protocol would allow and personally apologise.
29 January 2023	Liverpool	Brighton Hove Albion	Red card not awarded	VAR did not deem the yellow card a clear and obvious error	PGMOL stated that the foul was worthy of a red card.
11 February 2023	Crystal Palace	Brighton Hove Albion	Onside goal disallowed	VAR incorrectly placed offsides line	Howard Webb issued an apology to Brighton. Referee John Brooks was removed from VAR for two games.
11 February 2023	Brentford	Arsenal	Offside goal allowed	VAR did not fully investigate incident	Howard Webb issued an apology to Arsenal.
8 April 2023	Tottenham Hotspur	Brighton Hove Albion	Penalty not awarded	VAR did not deem the non-call a clear and obvious error	Chief Refereeing Officer Howard Webb issued an apology to Brighton.
14 August 2023	Manchester United	Wolverhampton Wanderers	Penalty not awarded	VAR did not deem the non-call a clear and obvious error	Head official and both VAR officials were suspended from further matches.
30 September 2023	Tottenham Hotspur	Liverpool	Onside goal disallowed	Miscommunication between VAR and on-field officials	Acknowledged the "serious human error" and released the referee audio from the match as well as subsequent matches to indicate new preventative procedures.
8 October 2023	Manchester City	Arsenal	Red card not awarded	Error by head official and VAR	Howard Webb admitted it was an error and review policies on officiating foreign games.
3 December 2023	Tottenham Hotspur	Manchester City	Advantage not played	Error by head official	Howard Webb admitted to an "officiating mistake" by the head official.
23 December 2023	Arsenal	Liverpool	Penalty not awarded	Error in judgment by head official and VAR	Howard Webb admitted that it was the wrong call and released the VAR audio.
21 April 2024	Everton	Nottingham Forest	Penalty not awarded	Error in judgment by head official and VAR	Howard Webb admitted that it was the wrong call and released the VAR audio.
23 August 2025	Arsenal	Leeds United	Penalty wrongly awarded	Error in judgment by VAR	
30 August 2025	Chelsea	Fulham	Goal disallowed	Error in judgment by VAR	Howard Webb admitted to the error and removed the VAR official from his next match
9 November 2025	Newcastle United	Brentford	Penalty not awarded	Error in judgment by on-field referee and VAR	Howard Webb admitted to the error
20 December 2025	Arsenal	Everton	Penalty not awarded	Error in judgment by on-field referee and VAR	Referee stood down from Premier League officiating duties the following matchweek
30 December 2025	Arsenal	Aston Villa	Second yellow card not awarded	Error in judgment by on-field referee	
19 April 2026	Arsenal	Manchester City	Red card not awarded	Error in judgment by on-field referee	
17 May 2026	Manchester United	Nottingham Forest	Goal allowed	VAR said goal should not have been given due to handball, however the referee gave it anyway	Howard Webb admitted it was an error and apologised to Nottingham Forest
13 September 2026	Manchester City	Manchester United	Offside goal allowed	Error in judgment by VAR, allowing goal that was not given on the field	Pro Ref gave formal apology to Manchester United
