= 1965–66 Northampton Town F.C. season =

Northampton Town
1965–66 season
- Chairman: Ted Buller
- Manager: Dave Bowen
- Stadium: County Ground
- Division One: 21st
- FA Cup: Third round
- League Cup: Third round
- Top goalscorer: League: Bobby Brown (9); All: Bobby Brown (10)
- Highest home attendance: 24,523 vs Fulham
- Lowest home attendance: 14,504 vs Blackpool
- Average home league attendance: 18,634

The 1965–66 season was Northampton Town's 69th season in their history and the first season in the first tier of English football, the First Division, following promotion from the Second Division the previous season. Alongside competing in Division One, the club also participated in the FA Cup and League Cup.

== Players ==
As of match played 30 April 1966.

Name	Position	Nat.	Place of birth	Date of birth (age)	Apps	Goals	Previous club	Date signed	Fee
Goalkeepers
Roger Barron	GK	(England)	Northampton	30 June 1947 (aged 18)	0	0	Apprentice	July 1965	N/A
Norman Coe	GK	(Wales)	Swansea	6 December 1940 (aged 25)	62	0	Arsenal	July 1960	
Bryan Harvey	GK	(England)	Stepney	26 August 1938 (aged 27)	109	0	Blackpool	October 1963	£4,000
Full backs
Vic Cockcroft	LB	(England)	Birmingham	25 February 1941 (aged 25)	47	1	Wolverhampton Wanderers	July 1962	
Mike Everitt	LB	(England)	Weeley	16 January 1941 (aged 25)	210	17	Arsenal	February 1961	£4,000
Theo Foley (c)	RB	(Republic of Ireland)	Dublin	2 April 1937 (aged 29)	203	10	Exeter City	May 1961	£1,000
John Mackin	RB	(Scotland)	Bellshill	18 November 1943 (aged 22)	9	1	Apprentice	November 1963	N/A
Half backs
Terry Branston	CH	(England)	Rugby	25 July 1938 (aged 27)	229	2	Apprentice	October 1958	N/A
John Clarke	CH	(England)	Northampton	23 October 1945 (aged 20)	0	0	Apprentice	July 1965	N/A
Graham Carr	HB	(England)	Corbridge	25 October 1944 (aged 21)	40	0	Apprentice	August 1962	N/A
Joe Kiernan	WH	(Scotland)	Coatbridge	22 October 1942 (aged 23)	112	4	Sunderland	July 1963	
John Kurila	WH	(Scotland)	Glasgow	10 April 1941 (aged 25)	84	3	Bristol City	November 1963	
John Linnell	WH	(England)	Northampton	2 January 1944 (aged 22)	0	0	Apprentice	September 1963	N/A
Inside/Outside forwards
Billy Best	OF	(Scotland)	Glasgow	7 September 1942 (aged 23)	17	3	Pollok	July 1962	
Joe Broadfoot	OF	(England)	Lewisham	4 March 1940 (aged 26)	18	1	Ipswich Town	October 1965	£27,000
Barry Lines	OF	(England)	Bletchley	16 May 1942 (aged 23)	198	45	Bletchley Town	September 1960	
Harry Walden	OF	(England)	Walgrave	22 December 1940 (aged 25)	64	1	Luton Town	June 1964	
Jim Hall	IF	(England)	Northampton	21 March 1945 (aged 21)	28	4	Apprentice	July 1963	N/A
Don Martin	IF	(England)	Corby	15 February 1944 (aged 22)	82	30	Apprentice	July 1962	N/A
Graham Moore	IF	(Wales)	Hengoed	7 March 1941 (aged 25)	22	7	Manchester United	December 1965	£15,000
Centre forwards
Bobby Brown	CF	(England)	Streatham	2 May 1940 (aged 25)	52	23	Watford	December 1963	
George Hudson	CF	(England)	Manchester	14 March 1937 (aged 29)	11	6	Coventry City	March 1966	
Bobby Hunt	CF	(England)	Colchester	1 October 1942 (aged 23)	42	12	Colchester United	March 1964	£15,000

== Competitions ==
=== Division One ===
==== League table ====
Pos	Team	Pld	W	D	L	GF	GA	GAv	Pts	Qualification or relegation
1	Liverpool (C)	42	26	9	7	79	34	2.324	61	Qualification for the European Cup first round
2	Leeds United	42	23	9	10	79	38	2.079	55	Qualification for the Inter-Cities Fairs Cup second round
3	Burnley	42	24	7	11	79	47	1.681	55	Qualification for the Inter-Cities Fairs Cup first round
4	Manchester United	42	18	15	9	84	59	1.424	51	
5	Chelsea	42	22	7	13	65	53	1.226	51	
6	West Bromwich Albion	42	19	12	11	91	69	1.319	50	Qualification for the Inter-Cities Fairs Cup second round
7	Leicester City	42	21	7	14	80	65	1.231	49	
8	Tottenham Hotspur	42	16	12	14	75	66	1.136	44	
9	Sheffield United	42	16	11	15	56	59	0.949	43	
10	Stoke City	42	15	12	15	65	64	1.016	42	
11	Everton	42	15	11	16	56	62	0.903	41	Qualification for the European Cup Winners' Cup first round (Note: Everton qualified for the European Cup Winners' Cup as the 1965–66 FA Cup winners.)
12	West Ham United	42	15	9	18	70	83	0.843	39	
13	Blackpool	42	14	9	19	55	65	0.846	37	
14	Arsenal	42	12	13	17	62	75	0.827	37	
15	Newcastle United	42	14	9	19	50	63	0.794	37	
16	Aston Villa	42	15	6	21	69	80	0.863	36	
17	Sheffield Wednesday	42	14	8	20	56	66	0.848	36	
18	Nottingham Forest	42	14	8	20	56	72	0.778	36	
19	Sunderland	42	14	8	20	51	72	0.708	36	
20	Fulham	42	14	7	21	67	85	0.788	35	
21	Northampton Town (R)	42	10	13	19	55	92	0.598	33	Relegation to the Second Division
22	Blackburn Rovers (R)	42	8	4	30	57	88	0.648	20	Relegation to the Second Division

Source: World Football
Rules for classification: 1) Points; 2) Goal average; 3) Goals scored
(C) Champions; (R) Relegated

==== Results summary ====
Overall								Home						Away					
Pld	W	D	L	GF	GA	GAv	Pts	W	D	L	GF	GA	Pts	W	D	L	GF	GA	Pts
42	10	13	19	55	92	0.598	33	8	6	7	31	32	22	2	7	12	24	60	11

Last updated: 12 April 2020.

==== League position by match ====
Round	1	2	3	4	5	6	7	8	9	10	11	12	13	14	15	16	17	18	19	20	21	22	23	24	25	26	27	28	29	30	31	32	33	34	35	36	37	38	39	40	41	42
Ground	A	H	H	A	A	A	H	H	A	H	A	H	A	H	A	H	A	H	A	H	A	H	A	A	H	A	H	A	A	H	A	H	H	A	H	A	H	H	A	H	H	A
Result	L	D	D	L	L	L	L	D	D	D	D	L	L	W	L	W	L	L	W	W	L	L	L	D	W	D	L	L	L	W	D	W	D	L	D	W	D	W	D	L	W	L
Position	15	17	17	17	19	20	20	21	21	21	21	21	21	21	21	20	21	21	21	20	20	20	20	20	20	20	20	20	20	20	20	19	19	20	20	20	20	20	20	21	20	21

Source: 11v11.com
A = Away; H = Home; W = Win; D = Draw; L = Loss

==== Matches ====
Win Draw Loss

21 August 1965 1	Everton	5–2	Northampton Town	Liverpool
15:00 BST	A.Young 20'; F.Pickering 65', 81'; D.Temple 71', 88'	Report	B.Brown 22'; B.Hunt 77'	Stadium: Goodison Park; Attendance: 48,489; Referee: Jim Carr

25 August 1965 2	Northampton Town	1–1	Arsenal	Northampton
19:30 BST	B.Brown 57'	Report	T.Baldwin 19'	Stadium: County Ground; Attendance: 17,352; Referee: Kevin Howley

28 August 1965 3	Northampton Town	1–1	Manchester United	Northampton
15:00 BST	B.Hunt 83'	Report	J.Connelly 10'	Stadium: County Ground; Attendance: 21,245; Referee: D.Brady

4 September 1965 4	Newcastle United	2–0	Northampton Town	Newcastle upon Tyne
15:00 BST	A.Suddick 47'; B.Cummings 61'	Report		Stadium: St James' Park; Attendance: 28,051; Referee: A.Starling

7 September 1965 5	Burnley	4–1	Northampton Town	Burnley
19:30 BST	T.Foley o.g.' W.Irvine	Report	C.Livesey	Stadium: Turf Moor; Attendance: 14,792; Referee: Ernest Crawford

10 September 1965 6	Northampton Town	3–4	West Bromwich Albion	Northampton
19:30 BST	B.Lines; T.Robson	Report	B.Hope; J.Astle	Stadium: County Ground; Attendance: 18,528; Referee: Jack Bullough

15 September 1965 7	Northampton Town	1–2	Burnley	Northampton
19:30 BST	T.Robson	Report	W.Irvine; A.Elder	Stadium: County Ground; Attendance: 19,336; Referee: Bill Holian

18 September 1965 8	Nottingham Forest	1–1	Northampton Town	Nottingham
15:00 BST	M.Kear	Report	V.Cockcroft	Stadium: City Ground; Attendance: 19,669; Referee: David Laing

25 September 1965 9	Northampton Town	0–0	Sheffield Wednesday	Northampton
15:00 BST		Report		Stadium: County Ground; Attendance: 16,299; Referee: Geoff Roper

28 September 1965 10	Arsenal	1–1	Northampton Town	Highbury, London
19:45 BST	J.Radford	Report	J.Hall	Stadium: Arsenal Stadium; Attendance: 33,240; Referee: Norman Burtenshaw

2 October 1965 11	Leicester City	1–1	Northampton Town	Leicester
15:00 BST	J.Goodfellow	Report	T.Foley	Stadium: Filbert Street; Attendance: 27,484; Referee: Ken Dagnall

9 October 1965 12	Northampton Town	0–1	Sheffield United	Northampton
15:00 BST		Report	K.Mallender 10'	Stadium: County Ground; Attendance: 17,300; Referee: Ken Burns

16 October 1965 13	Leeds United	6–1	Northampton Town	Leeds
15:00 BST	J.Storrie; B.Bremner 20'; J.Charlton 44'; A.Peacock 45'; P.Lorimer 67', 83'	Report	B.Best 14'	Stadium: Elland Road; Attendance: 33,748; Referee: Ray Tinkler

23 October 1965 14	Northampton Town	2–1	West Ham United	Northampton
15:00 BST	T.Foley 28' (pen.); K.Leek 80'	Report	K.Brown 49'	Stadium: County Ground; Attendance: 15,367; Referee: Donald Payne

30 October 1965 15	Sunderland	3–0	Northampton Town	Sunderland
15:00 GMT	N.Martin 33'; G.Mulhall 37'; A.Gauden 76'	Report		Stadium: Roker Park; Attendance: 32,216; Referee: Les Hamer

6 November 1965 16	Northampton Town	2–1	Aston Villa	Northampton
15:00 GMT	J.Hall 9', 10'	Report	B.Park 59'	Stadium: County Ground; Attendance: 18,836; Referee: Ken Stokes

13 November 1965 17	Liverpool	5–0	Northampton Town	Liverpool
15:00 GMT	I.St John 6'; W.Stevenson 17' (pen.); R.Hunt 32'; I.Callaghan 63'; P.Thompson 65'	Report		Stadium: Anfield; Attendance: 41,904; Referee: Peter Rhodes

20 November 1965 18	Northampton Town	0–2	Tottenham Hotspur	Northampton
15:00 GMT		Report	D.Mackay; F.Saul	Stadium: County Ground; Attendance: 17,611; Referee: Ray Aldous

27 November 1965 19	Fulham	1–4	Northampton Town	Fulham, London
15:00 GMT	J.Haynes	Report	B.Brown; B.Hunt	Stadium: Craven Cottage; Attendance: 11,389; Referee: Norman Burtenshaw

4 December 1965 20	Northampton Town	2–1	Blackpool	Northampton
15:00 GMT	J.Broadfoot; B.Lines	Report	A.Ball pen.'	Stadium: County Ground; Attendance: 14,504; Referee: Harry New

11 December 1965 21	Blackburn Rovers	6–1	Northampton Town	Blackburn
15:00 GMT	G.Jones; M.England; M.Ferguson; M.Harrison pen.'	Report	B.Lines	Stadium: Ewood Park; Attendance: 10,685; Referee: Roy Egan

27 December 1965 22	Northampton Town	2–3	Chelsea	Northampton
15:15 GMT	B.Brown 59'; G.Moore 79'	Report	B.Tambling 68', 78'; G.Graham 84'	Stadium: County Ground; Attendance: 23,325; Referee: Dennis Corbett

28 December 1965 23	Chelsea	1–0	Northampton Town	Fulham, London
19:30 GMT	B.Bridges 80'	Report		Stadium: Stamford Bridge; Attendance: 17,635; Referee: Leo Callaghan

1 January 1966 24	Sheffield United	2–2	Northampton Town	Sheffield
15:00 GMT	M.Jones	Report	B.Lines; D.Martin	Stadium: Bramall Lane; Attendance: 16,143; Referee: Walter Crossley

8 January 1966 25	Northampton Town	2–1	Blackburn Rovers	Northampton
15:00 GMT	B.Brown; J.Kiernan	Report	G.Sharples	Stadium: County Ground; Attendance: 15,820; Referee: Alan Weller

15 January 1966 26	West Ham United	1–1	Northampton Town	Upton Park, London
15:00 GMT	G.Hurst	Report	B.Brown	Stadium: Boleyn Ground; Attendance: 20,745; Referee: Peter Walters

29 January 1966 27	Northampton Town	0–2	Everton	Northampton
15:00 GMT		Report	D.Temple 4'; A.Scott 43'	Stadium: County Ground; Attendance: 16,309; Referee: Keith Styles

5 February 1966 28	Manchester United	6–2	Northampton Town	Manchester
15:00 GMT	D.Law 6', 46'; J.Connelly 10'; B.Charlton 27', 41', 84'	Report	G.Moore 22'; D.Martin 75'	Stadium: Old Trafford; Attendance: 35,273; Referee: Harold Hackney

12 February 1966 29	Stoke City	6–2	Northampton Town	Stoke-on-Trent
15:15 GMT	J.Ritchie pen.' R.Vernon; P.Dobing	Report	B.Brown; G.Moore	Stadium: Victoria Ground; Attendance: 16,522; Referee: Ken Stokes

19 February 1966 30	Northampton Town	3–1	Newcastle United	Northampton
15:00 GMT	D.Martin 15', 54'; G.Moore 33'	Report	J.Iley 90'	Stadium: County Ground; Attendance: 14,541; Referee: Geoff Davis

26 February 1966 31	West Bromwich Albion	1–1	Northampton Town	West Bromwich
15:00 GMT	C.Clark	Report	D.Martin	Stadium: The Hawthorns; Attendance: 18,923; Referee: Les Faulkner

5 March 1966 32	Northampton Town	2–1	Leeds United	Northampton
15:00 GMT	G.Hudson; B.Lines	Report	M.O'Grady	Stadium: County Ground; Attendance: 21,548; Referee: Tommy Dawes
Note: Fixture was previously postponed on 18 December 1965 due to a frozen pitch.

12 March 1966 33	Northampton Town	3–3	Nottingham Forest	Northampton
15:00 GMT	D.Martin 19'; G.Moore 49'; J.Kurila 90'	Report	J.Baker 7', 86'; I.Storey-Moore 61'	Stadium: County Ground; Attendance: 18,670; Referee: H.Richards

19 March 1966 34	Sheffield Wednesday	3–1	Northampton Town	Sheffield
15:00 GMT	D.Ford; J.Fantham	Report	G.Hudson	Stadium: Hillsborough; Attendance: 16,283; Referee: E.Norman

26 March 1966 35	Northampton Town	2–2	Leicester City	Northampton
19:30 BST	G.Hudson; G.Moore	Report	J.Sinclair; M.Stringfellow	Stadium: County Ground; Attendance: 21,564; Referee: Reg Paine

2 April 1966 36	Aston Villa	1–2	Northampton Town	Birmingham
15:00 BST	W.Hamilton	Report	J.Mackin; G.Moore	Stadium: Villa Park; Attendance: 10,438; Referee: George McCabe

9 April 1966 37	Northampton Town	0–0	Liverpool	Northampton
15:00 BST		Report		Stadium: County Ground; Attendance: 20,029; Referee: Peter Walters

12 April 1966 38	Northampton Town	1–0	Stoke City	Northampton
19:30 BST	D.Martin	Report		Stadium: County Ground; Attendance: 20,680; Referee: D.Wells

16 April 1966 39	Tottenham Hotspur	1–1	Northampton Town	Tottenham, London
15:00 BST	J.Greaves 78' (pen.)	Report	G.Hudson 34'	Stadium: White Hart Lane; Attendance: 29,749; Referee: Keith Walker

23 April 1966 40	Northampton Town	2–4	Fulham	Northampton
15:00 BST	G.Hudson; J.Kiernan	Report	B.Robson; S.Earle	Stadium: County Ground; Attendance: 24,523; Referee: Jack Taylor

25 April 1966 41	Northampton Town	2–1	Sunderland	Northampton
19:30 BST	M.Everitt 70'; G.Hudson 71'	Report	N.Martin 28'	Stadium: County Ground; Attendance: 17,921; Referee: Norman Burtenshaw

30 April 1966 42	Blackpool	3–0	Northampton Town	Blackpool
15:00 BST	L.Lea 51'; I.Moir 70'; A.Ball 87' (pen.)	Report		Stadium: Bloomfield Road; Attendance: 15,295; Referee: Ernie Crawford

=== FA Cup ===
22 January 1966 Third round	Northampton Town	1–2	Nottingham Forest	Northampton
15:00 GMT	Brown 32'		Crowe 29'; Wignall 65'	Stadium: County Ground; Attendance: 17,873; Referee: Kevin Howley

=== League Cup ===
21 September 1965 Second round	Blackburn Rovers	0–1	Northampton Town	Blackburn
19:30 BST			M.Everitt	Stadium: Ewood Park; Attendance: 8,814; Referee: Dick Windle

13 October 1965 Third round	Fulham	5–0	Northampton Town	Fulham, London
19:30 BST				Stadium: Craven Cottage; Attendance: 7,835; Referee: Bill Clements

=== Appearances and goals ===
Pos	Player	Division One			FA Cup			League Cup			Total		
Pos	Player	Starts	Sub	Goals	Starts	Sub	Goals	Starts	Sub	Goals	Starts	Sub	Goals
GK	Roger Barron	–	–	–	–	–	–	–	–	–	–	–	–
GK	Norman Coe	15	–	–	1	–	–	–	–	–	16	–	–
GK	Bryan Harvey	27	–	–	–	–	–	2	–	–	29	–	–
FB	Vic Cockcroft	17	1	1	–	–	–	1	–	–	18	1	1
FB	Mike Everitt	31	1	1	1	–	–	2	–	1	34	1	2
FB	Theo Foley	31	–	2	1	–	–	2	–	–	34	–	2
FB	John Mackin	7	2	1	–	–	–	–	–	–	7	2	1
HB	Terry Branston	27	1	–	1	–	–	1	–	–	29	1	–
HB	Graham Carr	27	–	–	1	–	–	2	–	–	30	–	–
HB	John Clarke	–	–	–	–	–	–	–	–	–	–	–	–
HB	Joe Kiernan	42	–	2	1	–	–	2	–	–	45	–	2
HB	John Kurila	20	–	1	–	–	–	1	–	–	21	–	1
HB	John Linnell	–	–	–	–	–	–	–	–	–	–	–	–
OF	Billy Best	4	–	1	–	–	–	–	–	–	4	–	1
OF	Joe Broadfoot	17	–	1	1	–	–	–	–	–	18	–	1
OF	Barry Lines	40	–	5	1	–	–	1	–	–	42	–	5
OF	Harry Walden	19	–	–	–	–	–	1	–	–	20	–	–
IF	Jim Hall	14	1	3	1	–	–	–	–	–	15	1	3
IF	Don Martin	26	–	7	–	–	–	1	–	–	27	–	7
IF	Graham Moore	21	–	7	1	–	–	–	–	–	22	–	7
CF	Bobby Brown	21	–	9	1	–	1	2	–	–	24	–	10
CF	George Hudson	11	–	6	–	–	–	–	–	–	11	–	6
CF	Bobby Hunt	13	–	3	–	–	–	–	–	–	13	–	3
Players who left before end of season:
WH	Derek Leck	10	–	–	–	–	–	–	–	–	10	–	–
OF	Brian Etheridge	–	–	–	–	–	–	1	–	–	1	–	–
OF	Tommy Robson	15	1	3	–	–	–	2	–	–	17	1	3
OF	Ronnie Walton	–	–	–	–	–	–	–	–	–	–	–	–
IF	Ken Leek	4	–	1	–	–	–	1	–	–	5	–	1
CF	Charlie Livesey	3	–	1	–	–	–	–	–	–	3	–	1
