= 1963–64 Northampton Town F.C. season =

Northampton Town
1963–64 season
- Chairman: Fred York
- Manager: Dave Bowen
- Stadium: County Ground
- Division Two: 11th
- FA Cup: Third round
- League Cup: Third round
- Top goalscorer: League: Frank Large (12); All: Frank Large (12)
- Highest home attendance: 18,177 vs Swindon Town
- Lowest home attendance: 8,047 vs Southampton
- Average home league attendance: 15,366

The 1963–64 season was Northampton Town's 67th season in their history and the first season in the second tier of English football, the Second Division, following promotion from the Third Division the previous season. Alongside competing in Division Two, the club also participated in the FA Cup and League Cup.

== Players ==
As of match played 25 April 1964.

Name	Position	Nat.	Place of Birth	Date of Birth (Age)	Apps	Goals	Previous club	Date signed	Fee
Goalkeepers
Norman Coe	GK	(Wales)	Swansea	6 December 1940 (aged 23)	46	0	Arsenal	July 1960	
Bryan Harvey	GK	(England)	Stepney	26 August 1938 (aged 25)	33	0	Blackpool	October 1963	£4,000
Full backs
Vic Cockcroft	LB	(England)	Birmingham	25 February 1941 (aged 23)	20	0	Wolverhampton Wanderers	July 1962	
Mike Everitt	LB	(England)	Weeley	16 January 1941 (aged 23)	132	13	Arsenal	February 1961	£4,000
Theo Foley (c)	RB	(Republic of Ireland)	Dublin	2 April 1937 (aged 27)	122	3	Exeter City	May 1961	£1,000
John Mackin	RB	(Scotland)	Bellshill	18 November 1943 (aged 20)	0	0	Apprentice	November 1963	N/A
Half backs
Terry Branston	CH	(England)	Rugby	25 July 1938 (aged 25)	160	0	Apprentice	October 1958	N/A
Graham Carr	CH	(England)	Corbridge	25 October 1944 (aged 19)	2	0	Apprentice	August 1962	N/A
Joe Kiernan	WH	(Scotland)	Coatbridge	22 October 1942 (aged 21)	21	0	Sunderland	July 1963	
John Kurila	WH	(Scotland)	Glasgow	10 April 1941 (aged 23)	61	2	Bristol City	November 1963	
Derek Leck	WH	(England)	Deal	8 February 1937 (aged 27)	211	43	Millwall	June 1958	
John Linnell	WH	(England)	Northampton	2 January 1944 (aged 20)	0	0	Apprentice	September 1963	N/A
Roly Mills	WH	(England)	Daventry	22 June 1933 (aged 30)	324	33	Apprentice	May 1951	N/A
Inside/Outside forwards
Billy Best	OF	(Scotland)	Glasgow	7 September 1942 (aged 21)	9	2	Pollok	July 1962	
Billy Hails	OF	(England)	Nettlesworth	19 February 1935 (aged 29)	63	13	Peterborough United	November 1962	
Barry Lines	OF	(England)	Bletchley	16 May 1942 (aged 21)	146	40	Bletchley Town	September 1960	
Tommy Robson	OF	(England)	Gateshead	31 July 1944 (aged 19)	24	5	Newcastle United	August 1961	N/A
Ronnie Walton	OF	(England)	Plymouth	12 October 1945 (aged 18)	0	0	Apprentice	September 1963	N/A
Brian Etheridge	IF	(England)	Northampton	4 March 1944 (aged 20)	11	0	Apprentice	July 1962	N/A
Jim Hall	IF	(England)	Northampton	21 March 1945 (aged 19)	4	0	Apprentice	July 1963	N/A
Don Martin	IF	(England)	Corby	15 February 1944 (aged 20)	23	7	Apprentice	July 1962	N/A
Centre forwards
Bobby Brown	CF	(England)	Streatham	2 May 1940 (aged 23)	7	0	Watford	December 1963	
Bobby Hunt	CF	(England)	Colchester	1 October 1942 (aged 21)	11	3	Colchester United	March 1964	£15,000

== Competitions ==
=== Division Two ===
==== League table ====
Pos	Team	Pld	W	D	L	GF	GA	GAv	Pts	Qualification or relegation
15	Cardiff City	42	14	10	18	56	81	0.691	38	Qualification for the European Cup Winners' Cup first round
16	Leyton Orient	42	13	10	19	54	72	0.750	36	
17	Norwich City	42	11	13	18	64	80	0.800	35	
18	Bury	42	13	9	20	57	73	0.781	35	
19	Swansea Town	42	12	9	21	63	74	0.851	33	

Rules for classification: 1) Points; 2) Goal average; 3) Goals scored

==== Results summary ====
Overall								Home						Away					
Pld	W	D	L	GF	GA	GAv	Pts	W	D	L	GF	GA	Pts	W	D	L	GF	GA	Pts
42	16	9	17	58	60	0.967	41	10	2	9	35	31	22	6	7	8	23	29	19

Last updated: 3 May 2020.

==== League position by match ====
Round	1	2	3	4	5	6	7	8	9	10	11	12	13	14	15	16	17	18	19	20	21	22	23	24	25	26	27	28	29	30	31	32	33	34	35	36	37	38	39	40	41	42
Ground	A	A	H	H	A	H	H	A	H	H	A	H	A	H	A	H	A	H	A	H	A	A	H	H	A	A	A	H	A	H	H	H	H	A	A	H	H	A	A	A	H	A
Result	W	W	W	L	D	L	W	L	W	L	L	W	W	L	W	L	D	L	L	W	L	D	W	L	L	D	D	W	W	W	D	D	L	D	L	W	W	D	L	W	L	L
Position	6	4	3	6	7	8	6	12	9	12	13	10	7	7	7	8	8	8	9	9	12	12	9	11	13	13	13	12	11	8	5	9	11	12	13	10	10	9	9	8	10	11

Source: 11v11.com
A = Away; H = Home; W = Win; D = Draw; L = Loss

==== Matches ====
Win Draw Loss

27 August 1963 1	Scunthorpe United	1–2	Northampton Town	Scunthorpe
19:30 BST			F.Large; B.Lines	Stadium: Old Showground; Attendance: 8,738

31 August 1963 2	Sunderland	0–2	Northampton Town	Sunderland
15:00 BST			B.Hails; R.Smith	Stadium: Roker Park; Attendance: 39,201

3 September 1963 3	Northampton Town	2–0	Scunthorpe United	Northampton
19:30 BST	B.Hails; F.Large			Stadium: County Ground; Attendance: 16,032; Referee: Bill Clements

7 September 1963 4	Northampton Town	0–1	Derby County	Northampton
15:00 BST			B.Hutchinson	Stadium: County Ground; Attendance: 14,672

11 September 1963 5	Norwich City	3–3	Northampton Town	Norwich
19:30 BST			F.Large; D.Leck; R.Smith	Stadium: Carrow Road; Attendance: 19,669

13 September 1963 6	Northampton Town	1–2	Bury	Northampton
15:00 BST	R.Smith			Stadium: County Ground; Attendance: 14,886

16 September 1963 7	Northampton Town	3–2	Norwich City	Northampton
19:30 BST	B.Best; F.Large			Stadium: County Ground; Attendance: 14,928

21 September 1963 8	Manchester City	3–0	Northampton Town	Manchester
15:00 BST				Stadium: Maine Road; Attendance: 21,340; Referee: Arthur Holland

28 September 1963 9	Northampton Town	4–0	Swindon Town	Northampton
15:00 BST	P.Kane 10', 90'; F.Large 21', 79'	Report		Stadium: County Ground; Attendance: 18,177; Referee: R V Spittle

1 October 1963 10	Northampton Town	0–3	Leeds United	Northampton
19:30 BST			I.Lawson; D.Weston; B.Collins	Stadium: County Ground; Attendance: 15,079

5 October 1963 11	Cardiff	1–0	Northampton Town	Cardiff, Wales
15:15 BST	M.Charles			Stadium: Ninian Park; Attendance: 10,178; Referee: Jack Taylor

8 October 1963 12	Northampton Town	1–0	Huddersfield Town	Northampton
19:30 BST	F.Large			Stadium: County Ground; Attendance: 13,257

12 October 1963 13	Plymouth Argyle	0–3	Northampton Town	Plymouth
15:15 BST			B.Hails; P.Kane	Stadium: Home Park; Attendance: 13,224

19 October 1963 14	Northampton Town	1–2	Charlton Athletic	Northampton
15:00 BST	F.Large			Stadium: County Ground; Attendance: 15,221

26 October 1963 15	Newcastle United	2–3	Northampton Town	Newcastle upon Tyne
15:00 BST	J.Iley pen.' C.Taylor		B.Hails; P.Kane; D.Martin	Stadium: St James' Park; Attendance: 25,743

2 November 1963 16	Northampton Town	0–3	Preston North End	Northampton
15:00 GMT				Stadium: County Ground; Attendance: 13,693

9 November 1963 17	Orient	0–0	Northampton Town	Leyton, London
15:00 GMT				Stadium: Brisbane Road; Attendance: 11,532; Referee: Peter Baldwin

16 November 1963 18	Northampton Town	2–3	Swansea Town	Northampton
15:00 GMT	P.Kane; B.Lines			Stadium: County Ground; Attendance: 10,985

23 November 1963 19	Southampton	3–1	Northampton Town	Southampton
15:00 GMT	T.Paine; K.Wimshurst		D.Martin	Stadium: The Dell; Attendance: 18,025

30 November 1963 20	Northampton Town	3–2	Middlesbrough	Northampton
15:00 GMT	D.Leck; D.Martin		I.Gibson; A.Kaye	Stadium: County Ground; Attendance: 10,346

7 December 1963 21	Grimsby Town	4–1	Northampton Town	Cleethorpes
15:00 GMT			B.Hails	Stadium: Blundell Park; Attendance: 6,305

14 December 1963 22	Leeds United	0–0	Northampton Town	Leeds
15:00 GMT				Stadium: Elland Road; Attendance: 21,208

21 December 1963 23	Northampton Town	5–1	Sunderland	Northampton
15:00 GMT	M.Everitt; B.Hails; F.Large; D.Martin			Stadium: County Ground; Attendance: 12,130

26 December 1963 24	Northampton Town	1–3	Rotherham United	Northampton
15:00 GMT	F.Large			Stadium: County Ground; Attendance: 15,089

28 December 1963 25	Rotherham United	1–0	Northampton Town	Rotherham
15:00 GMT				Stadium: Millmoor; Attendance: 10,618

11 January 1964 26	Derby County	0–0	Northampton Town	Derby
15:00 GMT				Stadium: Baseball Ground; Attendance: 10,195

18 January 1964 27	Bury	1–1	Northampton Town	Bury
15:00 GMT			T.Foley	Stadium: Gigg Lane; Attendance: 6,077

1 February 1964 28	Northampton Town	2–1	Manchester City	Northampton
15:00 GMT	P.Kane; D.Martin			Stadium: County Ground; Attendance: 12,330; Referee: Denis Howell

8 February 1964 29	Swindon Town	2–3	Northampton Town	Swindon
15:00 GMT	K.McPherson 65'; D.Rogers 89' (pen.)	Report	P.Kane 48'; F.Large 68'; B.Lines 76'	Stadium: County Ground; Attendance: 17,455; Referee: Norman Burtenshaw

15 February 1964 30	Northampton Town	2–1	Cardiff City	Northampton
15:00 GMT	B.Hails; P.Kane		M.Charles	Stadium: County Ground; Attendance: 11,871

18 February 1964 31	Northampton Town	0–0	Plymouth Argyle	Northampton
19:30 GMT				Stadium: County Ground; Attendance: 9,261

7 March 1964 32	Northampton Town	2–2	Newcastle United	Northampton
15:00 GMT	B.Hunt; D.Leck		A.Suddick; B.Cummings	Stadium: County Ground; Attendance: 11,440

21 March 1964 33	Northampton Town	1–2	Orient	Northampton
15:00 GMT	T.Robson			Stadium: County Ground; Attendance: 9,014

28 March 1964 34	Charlton Athletic	1–1	Northampton Town	Charlton, London
15:00 BST			M.Everitt	Stadium: The Valley; Attendance: 15,142

30 March 1964 35	Portsmouth	3–0	Northampton Town	Portsmouth
15:00 BST				Stadium: Fratton Park; Attendance: 13,633

31 March 1964 36	Northampton Town	2–1	Portsmouth	Northampton
19:30 BST	R.Mills; T.Foley			Stadium: County Ground; Attendance: 10,245

4 April 1964 37	Northampton Town	2–0	Southampton	Northampton
15:00 BST	B.Hunt; J.Kurila			Stadium: County Ground; Attendance: 8,047; Referee: Ray Tinkler

7 April 1964 38	Swansea Town	1–1	Northampton Town	Swansea, Wales
19:30 BST			B.Hunt	Stadium: Vetch Field; Attendance: 11,398

10 April 1964 39	Middlesbrough	1–0	Northampton Town	Middlesbrough
19:00 BST	T.Branston o.g.'			Stadium: Ayresome Park; Attendance: 9,220; Referee: J.E Carr

13 April 1964 40	Huddersfield Town	0–1	Northampton Town	Huddersfield
19:30 BST			B.Best	Stadium: Leeds Road; Attendance: 6,762

18 April 1964 41	Northampton Town	1–2	Grimsby Town	Northampton
15:00 BST	T.Robson			Stadium: County Ground; Attendance: 10,092

25 April 1964 42	Preston North End	2–1	Northampton Town	Preston
15:00 BST			T.Robson	Stadium: Deepdale; Attendance: 12,933

=== FA Cup ===
4 January 1965 Third round	Sunderland	2–0	Northampton Town	Sunderland
15:00 GMT				Stadium: Roker Park; Attendance: 40,683

=== League Cup ===
25 September 1963 Second round	Brighton & Hove Albion	1–1	Northampton Town	Hove
19:15 BST			R.Mills	Stadium: Goldstone Ground; Attendance: 5,496; Referee: John Osborne

14 October 1963 Second round (r)	Northampton Town	3–2	Brighton & Hove Albion	Northampton
19:30 BST	D.Leck; J.Reid; R.Smith			Stadium: County Ground; Attendance: 5,569

4 November 1963 Third round	Colchester United	4–1	Northampton Town	Colchester
19:15 GMT	King 23'; Wright 58', 71', 77'	Report	T.Robson 49'	Stadium: Layer Road; Attendance: 6,237; Referee: Tommy Dawes

=== Appearances and goals ===
Pos	Player	Division Two		FA Cup		League Cup		Total	
Pos	Player	Starts	Goals	Starts	Goals	Starts	Goals	Starts	Goals
GK	Norman Coe	1	–	–	–	–	–	1	–
GK	Bryan Harvey	32	–	1	–	–	–	33	–
FB	Vic Cockcroft	9	–	–	–	1	–	10	–
FB	Mike Everitt	42	2	1	–	2	–	45	2
FB	Theo Foley	26	2	1	–	–	–	27	2
FB	John Mackin	–	–	–	–	–	–	–	–
HB	Terry Branston	41	–	1	–	3	–	45	–
HB	Graham Carr	1	–	–	–	–	–	1	–
HB	Joe Kiernan	19	–	1	–	1	–	21	–
HB	John Kurila	18	1	–	–	–	–	18	1
HB	Derek Leck	33	3	1	–	3	1	37	4
HB	John Linnell	–	–	–	–	–	–	–	–
HB	Roly Mills	22	1	–	–	3	1	25	2
OF	Billy Best	9	2	–	–	–	–	9	2
OF	Billy Hails	33	8	1	–	3	–	37	8
OF	Barry Lines	25	3	1	–	1	–	27	3
OF	Tommy Robson	17	3	–	–	2	1	19	4
OF	Ronnie Walton	–	–	–	–	–	–	–	–
IF	Brian Etheridge	5	–	1	–	1	–	7	–
IF	Jim Hall	4	–	–	–	–	–	4	–
IF	Don Martin	20	7	–	–	1	–	21	7
CF	Bobby Brown	6	–	1	–	–	–	7	–
CF	Bobby Hunt	11	3	–	–	–	–	11	3
Players who left before end of season:
GK	Chic Brodie	9	–	–	–	3	–	12	–
FB	Bryn Jones	7	–	–	–	–	–	7	–
FB	Colin Sharpe	–	–	–	–	2	–	2	–
IF	Peter Kane	18	8	–	–	2	–	20	8
IF	John Reid	18	–	–	–	2	1	20	1
IF	Ray Smith	9	3	–	–	1	1	10	4
CF	Frank Large	27	12	1	–	1	–	29	12
CF	Bert Llewellyn	–	–	–	–	1	–	1	–
