= 1964–65 Northampton Town F.C. season =

Northampton Town
1964–65 season
- Chairman: Fred York
- Manager: Dave Bowen
- Stadium: County Ground
- Division Two: 2nd
- FA Cup: Third round
- League Cup: Quarter-final
- Top goalscorer: League: Don Martin; Bobby Brown; Tommy Robson (13); All: Don Martin (16)
- Highest home attendance: 20,660 vs Plymouth Argyle
- Lowest home attendance: 9,586 vs Bury
- Average home league attendance: 15,393

The 1964–65 season was Northampton Town's 68th season in their history and the second successive season in the Second Division. Alongside competing in Division Two, the club also participated in the FA Cup and League Cup.

== Players ==
As of match played 24 April 1965.

Name	Position	Nat.	Place of birth	Date of birth (age)	Apps	Goals	Previous club	Date signed	Fee
Goalkeepers
Norman Coe	GK	(Wales)	Swansea	6 December 1940 (aged 24)	46	0	Arsenal	July 1960	
Bryan Harvey	GK	(England)	Stepney	26 August 1938 (aged 26)	80	0	Blackpool	October 1963	£4,000
Full backs
Vic Cockcroft	LB	(England)	Birmingham	25 February 1941 (aged 24)	28	0	Wolverhampton Wanderers	July 1962	
Mike Everitt	LB	(England)	Weeley	16 January 1941 (aged 24)	175	15	Arsenal	February 1961	£4,000
Theo Foley (c)	RB	(Republic of Ireland)	Dublin	2 April 1937 (aged 28)	169	8	Exeter City	May 1961	£1,000
John Mackin	RB	(Scotland)	Bellshill	18 November 1943 (aged 21)	0	0	Apprentice	November 1963	N/A
Half backs
Terry Branston	CH	(England)	Rugby	25 July 1938 (aged 26)	199	2	Apprentice	October 1958	N/A
Graham Carr	CH	(England)	Corbridge	25 October 1944 (aged 20)	10	0	Apprentice	August 1962	N/A
Joe Kiernan	WH	(Scotland)	Coatbridge	22 October 1942 (aged 22)	67	2	Sunderland	July 1963	
John Kurila	WH	(Scotland)	Glasgow	10 April 1941 (aged 24)	63	2	Bristol City	November 1963	
Derek Leck	WH	(England)	Deal	8 February 1937 (aged 28)	257	46	Millwall	June 1958	
John Linnell	WH	(England)	Northampton	2 January 1944 (aged 21)	12	Apprentice	September 1963	N/A	
Inside/Outside forwards
Billy Best	OF	(Scotland)	Glasgow	7 September 1942 (aged 22)	13	2	Pollok	July 1962	
Barry Lines	OF	(England)	Bletchley	16 May 1942 (aged 22)	156	40	Bletchley Town	September 1960	
Tommy Robson	OF	(England)	Gateshead	31 July 1944 (aged 20)	64	18	Newcastle United	August 1961	N/A
Harry Walden	OF	(England)	Walgrave	22 December 1940 (aged 24)	44	1	Luton Town	June 1964	
Ronnie Walton	OF	(England)	Plymouth	12 October 1945 (aged 19)	1	0	Apprentice	September 1963	N/A
Brian Etheridge	IF	(England)	Northampton	4 March 1944 (aged 21)	21	1	Apprentice	July 1962	N/A
Jim Hall	IF	(England)	Northampton	21 March 1945 (aged 20)	12	1	Apprentice	July 1963	N/A
Ken Leek	IF	(Wales)	Ynysybwl	26 July 1935 (aged 29)	88	32	Birmingham City	December 1964	
Don Martin	IF	(England)	Corby	15 February 1944 (aged 21)	55	23	Apprentice	July 1962	N/A
Centre forwards
Bobby Brown	CF	(England)	Streatham	2 May 1940 (aged 24)	28	13	Watford	December 1963	
Bobby Hunt	CF	(England)	Colchester	1 October 1942 (aged 22)	29	9	Colchester United	March 1964	£15,000
Charlie Livesey	CF	(England)	West Ham	6 February 1938 (aged 27)	30	5	Brighton & Hove Albion	August 1964	

== Competitions ==
=== Division Two ===
==== League table ====
Pos	Team	Pld	W	D	L	GF	GA	GAv	Pts
4	Southampton	42	17	14	11	83	63	1.317	48
5	Ipswich Town	42	15	17	10	74	67	1.104	47
6	Norwich City	42	20	7	15	61	57	1.070	47
7	Crystal Palace	42	16	13	13	55	51	1.078	45
8	Huddersfield Town	42	17	10	15	53	51	1.039	44

Rules for classification: 1) Points; 2) Goal average; 3) Goals scored

==== Results summary ====
Overall								Home						Away					
Pld	W	D	L	GF	GA	GAv	Pts	W	D	L	GF	GA	Pts	W	D	L	GF	GA	Pts
42	20	16	6	66	50	1.32	56	14	7	0	37	16	35	6	9	6	29	34	21

Last updated: 12 April 2020.

==== League position by match ====
Round	1	2	3	4	5	6	7	8	9	10	11	12	13	14	15	16	17	18	19	20	21	22	23	24	25	26	27	28	29	30	31	32	33	34	35	36	37	38	39	40	41	42
Ground	A	A	H	A	H	H	A	A	H	H	A	A	H	A	H	A	H	A	H	A	H	A	H	A	H	A	H	A	H	A	H	H	H	A	A	H	A	H	A	A	H	H
Result	L	W	D	L	W	W	D	W	W	W	D	D	W	D	W	W	D	D	W	D	W	L	W	D	D	L	D	W	W	D	W	W	D	D	L	W	W	D	W	L	W	D
Position	20	12	11	17	12	9	8	8	7	3	1	2	1	1	1	1	1	1	1	1	1	2	2	2	2	2	2	2	2	3	1	1	2	2	2	2	2	2	2	2	2	2

Source: 11v11.com
A = Away; H = Home; W = Win; D = Draw; L = Loss

==== Matches ====
Win Draw Loss

24 August 1964 1	Middlesbrough	1–0	Northampton Town	Middlesbrough
19:15 BST	A.Horsfield			Stadium: Ayresome Park; Attendance: 27,122; Referee: Jim Carr

29 August 1964 2	Manchester City	0–2	Northampton Town	Manchester
15:00 BST			T.Foley; B.Hunt	Stadium: Maine Road; Attendance: 20,935; Referee: Syd Stoakes

1 September 1964 3	Northampton Town	1–1	Middlesbrough	Northampton
19:30 BST	D.Martin		A.Horsfield	Stadium: County Ground; Attendance: 17,028; Referee: Geoff Davis

5 September 1964 4	Southampton	2–0	Northampton Town	Southampton
15:00 BST	K.Wimshurst; J.Sydenham			Stadium: The Dell; Attendance: 13,989; Referee: Ray Aldous

8 September 1964 5	Northampton Town	1–0	Newcastle United	Northampton
19:30 BST	B.Etheridge			Stadium: County Ground; Attendance: 15,977

11 September 1964 6	Northampton Town	3–2	Huddersfield Town	Northampton
15:00 BST	C.Livesey; T.Robson		L.Massie; M.O'Grady	Stadium: County Ground; Attendance: 12,984

15 September 1964 7	Ipswich Town	0–0	Northampton Town	Ipswich
19:30 BST				Stadium: Portman Road; Attendance: 13,989; Referee: Norman Burtenshaw

19 September 1964 8	Coventry City	0–1	Northampton Town	Coventry
15:00 BST			T.Robson	Stadium: Highfield Road; Attendance: 30,113; Referee: George McCabe

26 September 1964 9	Northampton Town	1–0	Cardiff City	Northampton
15:00 BST	M.Everitt			Stadium: County Ground; Attendance: 12,328; Referee: Ken Burns

29 September 1964 10	Northampton Town	3–2	Ipswich Town	Northampton
19:30 BST	B.Hunt			Stadium: County Ground; Attendance: 14,886

3 October 1964 11	Preston North End	2–2	Northampton Town	Preston
15:00 BST			T.Robson; H.Walden	Stadium: Deepdale; Attendance: 15,953

7 October 1964 12	Portsmouth	3–3	Northampton Town	Portsmouth
19:30 BST			T.Branston; C.Livesey; T.Robson	Stadium: Fratton Park; Attendance: 13,552

10 October 1964 13	Northampton Town	1–0	Charlton Athletic	Northampton
15:00 BST	T.Robson			Stadium: County Ground; Attendance: 13,552

17 October 1964 14	Orient	2–2	Northampton Town	Leyton, London
15:00 BST			J.Hall; D.Martin	Stadium: Brisbane Road; Attendance: 8,390

24 October 1964 15	Northampton Town	2–0	Bury	Northampton
15:00 BST	T.Foley; D.Martin			Stadium: County Ground; Attendance: 11,324

31 October 1964 16	Crystal Palace	1–2	Northampton Town	Croydon, London
15:00 GMT			C.Livesey; T.Robson	Stadium: Selhurst Park; Attendance: 21,331

7 November 1964 17	Northampton Town	0–0	Norwich City	Northampton
15:00 GMT				Stadium: County Ground; Attendance: 11,273

14 November 1964 18	Rotherham United	1–1	Northampton Town	Rotherham
15:00 GMT			D.Leck	Stadium: Millmoor; Attendance: 11,273

21 November 1964 19	Northampton Town	2–1	Swansea Town	Northampton
15:00 GMT	D.Martin; T.Robson			Stadium: County Ground; Attendance: 13,427

28 November 1964 20	Derby County	2–2	Northampton Town	Derby
15:00 GMT	A.Durban; I.Buxton		B.Brown; D.Martin	Stadium: Baseball Ground; Attendance: 17,367

5 December 1964 21	Northampton Town	2–1	Swindon Town	Northampton
15:00 GMT	B.Brown 72'; H.Walden 75'	Report	D.Brown 62'	Stadium: County Ground; Attendance: 9,586; Referee: Ernest Crawford

12 December 1964 22	Newcastle United	5–0	Northampton Town	Newcastle upon Tyne
15:00 GMT	R.McGarry; T.Hockey o.g.'			Stadium: St James' Park; Attendance: 40,376

19 December 1964 23	Northampton Town	2–0	Manchester City	Northampton
15:00 GMT	M.Everitt; D.Leck			Stadium: County Ground; Attendance: 12,665; Referee: Maurice Fussey

26 December 1964 24	Bolton Wanderers	0–0	Northampton Town	Bolton
15:00 GMT				Stadium: Burnden Park; Attendance: 24,487

2 January 1965 25	Northampton Town	2–2	Southampton	Northampton
15:00 GMT	T.Branston; K.Leek		M.Chivers o.g.'	Stadium: County Ground; Attendance: 15,245

16 January 1965 26	Huddersfield Town	2–0	Northampton Town	Huddersfield
15:00 GMT	C.Balderstone; L.Massie			Stadium: Leeds Road; Attendance: 7,359

23 January 1965 27	Northampton Town	1–1	Coventry City	Northampton
15:00 GMT	K.Leek		D.Clements	Stadium: County Ground; Attendance: 18,741

6 February 1965 28	Cardiff City	0–2	Northampton Town	Cardiff, Wales
15:15 GMT			B.Brown	Stadium: Ninian Park; Attendance: 7,427; Referee: Arthur Edge

13 February 1965 29	Northampton Town	2–1	Preston North End	Northampton
15:00 GMT	B.Brown; T.Robson			Stadium: County Ground; Attendance: 14,010

20 February 1965 30	Charlton Athletic	1–1	Northampton Town	Charlton, London
15:00 GMT			T.Robson	Stadium: The Valley; Attendance: 8,958

27 February 1965 31	Northampton Town	2–0	Orient	Northampton
15:00 GMT	K.Leek; T.Robson			Stadium: County Ground; Attendance: 13,517

27 February 1965 32	Northampton Town	4–0	Bolton Wanderers	Northampton
15:00 GMT	T.Foley; D.Leck; D.Martin			Stadium: County Ground; Attendance: 15,515

13 March 1965 33	Northampton Town	1–1	Crystal Palace	Northampton
15:00 GMT	B.Brown			Stadium: County Ground; Attendance: 17,350

20 March 1965 34	Norwich City	1–1	Northampton Town	Norwich
15:00 GMT			T.Robson	Stadium: Carrow Road; Attendance: 25,199

23 March 1965 35	Swindon Town	4–2	Northampton Town	Swindon
19:30 BST	E.Hunt 49', 60'; M.Summerbee 51'; D.Rogers 84'	Report	B.Brown	Stadium: County Ground; Attendance: 17,886; Referee: George Martin

27 March 1965 36	Northampton Town	1–0	Rotherham United	Northampton
15:00 BST	B.Brown			Stadium: County Ground; Attendance: 19,488

3 April 1965 37	Swansea Town	1–2	Northampton Town	Swansea, Wales
15:15 BST			B.Brown; D.Martin	Stadium: Vetch Field; Attendance: 10,516

10 April 1965 38	Northampton Town	2–2	Derby County	Northampton
15:00 BST	D.Martin 59'; B.Brown 77'		A.Durban 75', 80'	Stadium: County Ground; Attendance: 17,917

17 April 1965 39	Bury	1–4	Northampton Town	Bury
15:00 BST			B.Brown; J.Kiernan; D.Martin	Stadium: Gigg Lane; Attendance: 6,800

19 April 1965 40	Plymouth Argyle	5–2	Northampton Town	Plymouth
15:00 BST			J.Kiernan; D.Martin; D.Leck (red card)	Stadium: Home Park; Attendance: 10,547

20 April 1965 41	Northampton Town	3–1	Plymouth Argyle	Northampton
19:30 BST	B.Brown; D.Martin o.g.'			Stadium: County Ground; Attendance: 19,718

24 April 1965 42	Northampton Town	1–1	Portsmouth	Northampton
15:00 BST	o.g.'			Stadium: County Ground; Attendance: 20,660

=== FA Cup ===
9 January 1965 Third round	Chelsea	4–1	Northampton Town	Fulham, London
14:45 GMT	Tambling 44'; Bridges 55', 78'; Foley 57' (o.g.)		Foley 68' (pen.)	Stadium: Stamford Bridge; Attendance: 44,335; Referee: Tommy Dawes

=== League Cup ===
23 September 1964 Second round	Bournemouth & Boscombe Athletic	0–2	Northampton Town	Bournemouth
19:30 BST			B.Hunt; C.Livesey	Stadium: Dean Court; Attendance: 8,807

20 October 1964 Third round	Northampton Town	2–1	Portsmouth	Northampton
19:30 BST	C.Livesey; D.Martin			Stadium: County Ground; Attendance: 7,380

4 November 1964 Fourth round	Northampton Town	4–1	Chesterfield	Northampton
19:30 GMT	T.Foley; B.Hunt; D.Martin; M.Everitt (red card)			Stadium: County Ground; Attendance: 6,695

25 November 1964 Quarter-final	Plymouth Argyle	1–0	Northampton Town	Plymouth
19:30 GMT				Stadium: Home Park; Attendance: 21,698

=== Appearances and goals ===
Pos	Player	Division Two		FA Cup		League Cup		Total	
Pos	Player	Starts	Goals	Starts	Goals	Starts	Goals	Starts	Goals
GK	Norman Coe	–	–	–	–	–	–	–	–
GK	Bryan Harvey	42	–	1	–	4	–	47	–
FB	Vic Cockcroft	6	–	1	–	1	–	8	–
FB	Mike Everitt	39	2	1	–	3	–	43	2
FB	Theo Foley	42	3	1	1	4	1	47	5
FB	John Mackin	–	–	–	–	–	–	–	–
HB	Terry Branston	34	2	1	–	4	–	39	2
HB	Graham Carr	8	–	–	–	–	–	8	–
HB	Joe Kiernan	41	2	1	–	4	–	46	2
HB	John Kurila	1	–	–	–	1	–	2	–
HB	Derek Leck	42	3	1	–	3	–	46	3
HB	John Linnell	–	–	–	–	–	–	–	–
OF	Billy Best	4	–	–	–	–	–	4	–
OF	Barry Lines	9	–	–	–	1	–	10	–
OF	Tommy Robson	36	13	1	–	3	–	40	13
OF	Harry Walden	39	1	1	–	4	–	44	1
OF	Ronnie Walton	1	–	–	–	–	–	1	–
IF	Brian Etheridge	9	1	–	–	1	–	10	1
IF	Jim Hall	6	1	–	–	2	–	8	1
IF	Ken Leek	12	3	1	–	–	–	13	3
IF	Don Martin	30	13	–	–	2	3	32	16
CF	Bobby Brown	20	13	–	–	1	–	21	13
CF	Charlie Livesey	25	3	1	–	4	2	30	5
CF	Bobby Hunt	16	4	–	–	2	2	18	6
