= 1966–67 Northampton Town F.C. season =

Northampton Town
1966–67 season
- Chairman: Ted Buller
- Manager: Dave Bowen
- Stadium: County Ground
- Division Two: 21st
- FA Cup: First round
- League Cup: Third round
- Top goalscorer: League: Don Martin (13); All: Don Martin (18)
- Highest home attendance: 20,100 vs Coventry City
- Lowest home attendance: 5,631 vs Rotherham United
- Average home league attendance: 11,977

The 1966–67 season was Northampton Town's 70th season in their history and the first season back in the Second Division, following relegation from the First Division the previous season. Alongside competing in Division Two, the club also participated in the FA Cup and League Cup.

== Players ==
As of match played 13 May 1967.

Name	Position	Nat.	Place of birth	Date of birth (age)	Apps	Goals	Previous club	Date signed	Fee
Goalkeepers
Roger Barron	GK	(England)	Northampton	30 June 1947 (aged 19)	0	0	Apprentice	July 1965	N/A
Bryan Harvey	GK	(England)	Stepney	26 August 1938 (aged 28)	137	0	Blackpool	October 1963	£4,000
Full backs
Vic Cockcroft	LB	(England)	Birmingham	25 February 1941 (aged 26)	54	1	Wolverhampton Wanderers	July 1962	
Theo Foley	RB	(Republic of Ireland)	Dublin	2 April 1937 (aged 30)	220	8	Exeter City	May 1961	£1,000
John Mackin	RB	(Scotland)	Bellshill	18 November 1943 (aged 23)	49	5	Apprentice	November 1963	N/A
Clive Walker	LB	(England)	Watford	24 October 1945 (aged 21)	25	0	Leicester City	October 1966	
Half backs
Terry Branston (c)	CH	(England)	Rugby	25 July 1938 (aged 28)	271	2	Apprentice	October 1958	N/A
John Clarke	CH	(England)	Northampton	23 October 1945 (aged 21)	3	0	Apprentice	July 1965	N/A
Graham Carr	HB	(England)	Corbridge	25 October 1944 (aged 22)	54	0	Apprentice	August 1962	N/A
Joe Kiernan	WH	(Scotland)	Coatbridge	22 October 1942 (aged 24)	145	7	Sunderland	July 1963	
John Kurila	WH	(Scotland)	Glasgow	10 April 1941 (aged 26)	125	4	Bristol City	November 1963	
John Linnell	WH	(England)	Northampton	2 January 1944 (aged 23)	1	0	Apprentice	September 1963	N/A
Inside/Outside forwards
Billy Best	OF	(Scotland)	Glasgow	7 September 1942 (aged 24)	39	13	Pollok	July 1962	
Graham Felton	OF	(England)	Cambridge	1 March 1949 (aged 18)	15	0	Cambridge United	August 1966	
Barry Lines	OF	(England)	Bletchley	16 May 1942 (aged 24)	242	47	Bletchley Town	September 1960	
Harry Walden	OF	(England)	Walgrave	22 December 1940 (aged 26)	85	3	Luton Town	June 1964	
Dennis Brown	IF	(England)	Reading	8 February 1944 (aged 23)	8	3	Swindon Town	February 1967	£5,000 P/E
Don Martin	IF	(England)	Corby	15 February 1944 (aged 23)	120	48	Apprentice	July 1962	N/A
Graham Moore (c)	IF	(Wales)	Hengoed	7 March 1941 (aged 26)	59	12	Manchester United	December 1965	£15,000
Ray Price	IF	(England)	Northampton	30 November 1948 (aged 18)	1	0	Apprentice	July 1966	N/A
Centre forwards
Jim Hall	CF	(England)	Northampton	21 March 1945 (aged 22)	43	7	Apprentice	July 1963	N/A
Frank Large	CF	(England)	Leeds	26 January 1940 (aged 27)	70	38	Oldham Athletic	December 1966	£10,000

== Competitions ==
=== Division Two ===
==== League table ====
Pos	Team	Pld	W	D	L	GF	GA	GAv	Pts
9	Bolton Wanderers	42	14	14	14	64	58	1.103	42
10	Birmingham City	42	16	8	18	70	66	1.061	40
11	Norwich City	42	13	14	15	49	55	0.891	40
12	Hull City	42	16	7	19	77	72	1.069	39
13	Preston North End	42	16	7	19	65	67	0.970	39

Rules for classification: 1) Points; 2) Goal average; 3) Goals scored

==== Results summary ====
Overall								Home						Away					
Pld	W	D	L	GF	GA	GAv	Pts	W	D	L	GF	GA	Pts	W	D	L	GF	GA	Pts
42	12	6	24	47	84	0.56	30	8	6	7	28	33	22	4	0	17	19	51	8

Last updated: 14 May 2020.

==== League position by match ====
Round	1	2	3	4	5	6	7	8	9	10	11	12	13	14	15	16	17	18	19	20	21	22	23	24	25	26	27	28	29	30	31	32	33	34	35	36	37	38	39	40	41	42
Ground	A	H	H	A	H	H	H	A	A	H	A	H	H	A	H	A	H	A	A	H	A	H	A	H	A	H	A	H	A	H	A	H	H	A	A	H	A	H	A	H	A	A
Result	L	W	D	L	L	L	W	W	L	L	L	L	L	L	W	L	W	W	L	L	L	W	W	L	L	D	L	D	L	W	L	D	W	W	L	D	L	D	L	W	L	L
Position	15	11	9	11	19	21	16	13	15	19	20	20	21	21	21	21	21	21	22	22	22	22	22	22	22	22	22	22	22	22	22	22	21	21	21	21	21	21	21	21	21	21

Source: 11v11.com
A = Away; H = Home; W = Win; D = Draw; L = Loss

==== Matches ====
Win Draw Loss

21 August 1966 1	Preston North End	2–1	Northampton Town	Preston
15:00 BST			B.Best	Stadium: Deepdale; Attendance: 12,192

28 August 1966 2	Northampton Town	3–1	Rotherham United	Northampton
15:00 BST	B.Best; D.Martin			Stadium: County Ground; Attendance: 13,955

30 August 1966 3	Northampton Town	0–0	Bury	Northampton
19:30 BST				Stadium: County Ground; Attendance: 10,025

1 September 1966 4	Millwall	1–0	Northampton Town	Millwall, London
15:15 BST			B.Best	Stadium: The Den; Attendance: 11,121; Referee: Geoff Roper

6 September 1966 5	Northampton Town	1–2	Norwich City	Northampton
19:30 BST	D.Martin			Stadium: County Ground; Attendance: 14,767; Referee: Bill Handley

10 September 1966 6	Northampton Town	0–2	Derby County	Northampton
15:00 BST				Stadium: County Ground; Attendance: 10,975; Referee: Tommy Dawes

17 September 1966 7	Northampton Town	2–1	Plymouth Argyle	Northampton
15:00 BST	B.Lines; H.Walden			Stadium: County Ground; Attendance: 9,802; Referee: John Osborne

20 September 1966 8	Bury	1–2	Northampton Town	Bury
19:30 BST			B.Best; J.Mackin	Stadium: Gigg Lane; Attendance: 8,580

23 September 1966 9	Hull City	6–1	Northampton Town	Kingston upon Hull
19:30 BST			B.Lines 2'	Stadium: Boothferry Park; Attendance: 29,122

1 October 1966 10	Northampton Town	2–4	Portsmouth	Northampton
15:00 BST	J.Kiernan; D.Martin			Stadium: County Ground; Attendance: 10,364; Referee: George McCabe

8 October 1966 11	Crystal Palace	5–1	Northampton Town	Selhurst, London
15:00 BST			D.Martin	Stadium: Selhurst Park; Attendance: 18,507

15 October 1966 12	Northampton Town	0–1	Huddersfield Town	Northampton
15:00 BST			T.Leighton	Stadium: County Ground; Attendance: 13,355

29 October 1966 13	Northampton Town	0–4	Wolverhampton Wanderers	Northampton
15:00 GMT				Stadium: County Ground; Attendance: 16,761

5 November 1966 14	Ipswich Town	6–1	Northampton Town	Ipswich
15:00 GMT			B.Best	Stadium: Portman Road; Attendance: 12,820

12 November 1966 15	Northampton Town	2–1	Bristol City	Northampton
15:00 GMT	B.Jones; J.Kurila			Stadium: County Ground; Attendance: 10,004

19 November 1966 16	Carlisle United	2–0	Northampton Town	Carlisle
15:00 GMT				Stadium: Brunton Park; Attendance: 11,946

26 November 1966 17	Northampton Town	2–1	Blackburn Rovers	Northampton
15:00 GMT	D.Martin; G.Moore			Stadium: County Ground; Attendance: 9,470

3 December 1966 18	Bolton Wanderers	1–2	Northampton Town	Bolton
15:00 GMT			J.Mackin; D.Martin	Stadium: Burnden Park; Attendance: 10,352

14 December 1966 19	Cardiff City	4–2	Northampton Town	Cardiff, Wales
19:30 GMT			J.Mackin; D.Martin	Stadium: Ninian Park; Attendance: 7,954

17 December 1966 20	Northampton Town	1–5	Preston North End	Northampton
15:00 GMT	D.Martin			Stadium: County Ground; Attendance: 10,050

26 December 1966 21	Birmingham City	3–0	Northampton Town	Birmingham
15:00 GMT	J.Vincent; G.Vowden			Stadium: St Andrew's; Attendance: 24,302; Referee: Arthur Dimond

27 December 1966 22	Northampton Town	2–1	Birmingham City	Northampton
19:30 GMT	F.Large; D.Martin		B.Bridges	Stadium: County Ground; Attendance: 15,433; Referee: John Homewood

31 December 1966 23	Rotherham United	1–2	Northampton Town	Rotherham
15:00 GMT			F.Large; D.Martin	Stadium: Millloor; Attendance: 9,497

7 January 1967 24	Northampton Town	1–2	Millwall	Northampton
15:00 GMT	J.Kiernan			Stadium: County Ground; Attendance: 11,343

14 January 1967 25	Derby County	4–3	Northampton Town	Derby
15:00 GMT	B.Hodgson; A.Durban; K.Hector; P.Waller		J.Kiernan; F.Large; D.Martin	Stadium: Baseball Ground; Attendance: 14,533

17 January 1967 26	Northampton Town	1–1	Charlton Athletic	Northampton
19:30 GMT	D.Martin			Stadium: County Ground; Attendance: 11,578

21 January 1967 27	Plymouth Argyle	1–0	Northampton Town	Plymouth
15:00 GMT				Stadium: Home Park; Attendance: 12,830

4 February 1967 28	Northampton Town	2–2	Hull City	Northampton
15:00 GMT	B.Best; G.Moore			Stadium: County Ground; Attendance: 12,396

11 February 1967 29	Portsmouth	3–2	Northampton Town	Portsmouth
15:00 GMT			D.Brown; G.Moore	Stadium: Fratton Park; Attendance: 18,979

25 February 1967 30	Northampton Town	1–0	Crystal Palace	Northampton
15:00 GMT	D.Brown			Stadium: County Ground; Attendance: 13,081

4 March 1967 31	Wolverhampton Wanderers	1–0	Northampton Town	Wolverhampton
15:00 GMT				Stadium: Molineux Stadium; Attendance: 25,672

11 March 1967 32	Northampton Town	0–0	Coventry City	Northampton
15:00 GMT				Stadium: County Ground; Attendance: 20,100

18 March 1967 33	Northampton Town	2–0	Cardiff City	Northampton
15:00 GMT	D.Brown; F.Large			Stadium: County Ground; Attendance: 11,787

25 March 1967 34	Huddersfield Town	0–2	Northampton Town	Huddersfield
15:00 BST			F.Large	Stadium: Leeds Road; Attendance: 18,214

28 March 1967 35	Coventry City	2–0	Northampton Town	Coventry
19:30 BST	B.Gould; E.Machin			Stadium: Highfield Road; Attendance: 38,566

1 April 1967 36	Northampton Town	1–1	Ipswich Town	Northampton
15:00 BST	J.Hall			Stadium: County Ground; Attendance: 13,129

7 April 1967 37	Bristol City	1–0	Northampton Town	Bristol
15:00 BST				Stadium: Ashton Gate; Attendance: 23,750

15 April 1967 38	Northampton Town	3–3	Carlisle United	Northampton
15:00 BST	F.Large; H.Walden; J.Mackin			Stadium: County Ground; Attendance: 10,752

22 April 1967 39	Blackburn Rovers	3–0	Northampton Town	Blackburn
15:00 BST			C.Walker (red card)	Stadium: Ewood Park; Attendance: 9,883

29 April 1967 40	Northampton Town	2–1	Bolton Wanderers	Northampton
15:00 BST	F.Large; D.Martin			Stadium: County Ground; Attendance: 9,387

6 May 1967 41	Charlton Athletic	3–0	Northampton Town	Charlton, London
15:00 BST				Stadium: The Valley; Attendance: 15,098

13 May 1967 42	Norwich City	1–0	Northampton Town	Norwich
15:00 BST				Stadium: Carrow Road; Attendance: 13,544

=== FA Cup ===
25 January 1967 Third round	Northampton Town	1–3	West Bromwich Albion	Northampton
15:00 GMT	T.Foley			Stadium: County Ground; Attendance: 16,899

=== League Cup ===
14 September 1966 Second round	Northampton Town	2–2	Peterborough United	Northampton
19:30 BST	B.Best; B.Brown			Stadium: County Ground; Attendance: 5,778

26 September 1966 Second round (r)	Peterborough United	0–2	Northampton Town	Peterborough
19:30 BST			B.Best; D.Martin	Stadium: London Road; Attendance: 9,484; Referee: Dick Windle

5 October 1966 Third round	Northampton Town	2-1	Rotherham United	Northampton
19:30 BST	J.Hall; J.Mackin			Stadium: County Ground; Attendance: 5,631

26 October 1966 Fourth round	Brighton & Hove Albion	1–1	Northampton Town	Hove
19:30 GMT			B.Best	Stadium: Goldstone Ground; Attendance: 17,235

1 November 1966 Fourth round (r)	Northampton Town	8–0	Brighton & Hove Albion	Northampton
19:30 GMT	B.Best; D.Martin; G.Moore o.g.'			Stadium: County Ground; Attendance: 6,889

7 December 1966 Fifth round	Northampton Town	1–3	West Bromwich Albion	Northampton
19:30 GMT	J.Hall			Stadium: County Ground; Attendance: 14,706

=== Appearances and goals ===
Pos	Player	Division Two			FA Cup			League Cup			Total		
Pos	Player	Starts	Sub	Goals	Starts	Sub	Goals	Starts	Sub	Goals	Starts	Sub	Goals
GK	Bryan Harvey	25	–	–	–	–	–	3	–	–	28	–	–
FB	Vic Cockcroft	6	–	–	–	–	–	1	–	–	7	–	–
FB	Theo Foley	16	–	–	1	–	–	–	–	–	17	–	–
FB	Gerry Jordon	1	–	–	–	–	–	–	–	–	1	–	–
FB	John Mackin	34	2	4	1	–	–	3	–	1	38	2	5
FB	Gerry Perryman	1	–	–	–	–	–	–	–	–	1	–	–
FB	Clive Walker	22	–	–	–	–	–	3	–	–	25	–	–
HB	Terry Branston	35	1	–	1	–	–	5	–	–	41	1	–
HB	Graham Carr	11	–	–	–	–	–	3	–	–	14	–	–
HB	John Clarke	2	–	–	–	–	–	1	–	–	3	–	–
HB	Joe Kiernan	25	1	3	1	–	–	6	–	–	32	1	3
HB	John Kurila	37	–	1	1	–	–	3	–	–	41	–	1
HB	John Linnell	–	–	–	–	–	–	1	–	–	1	–	–
OF	Billy Best	15	–	6	1	–	–	6	–	4	22	–	10
OF	Graham Felton	13	–	–	1	–	–	1	–	–	15	–	–
OF	Barry Lines	38	–	2	–	–	–	6	–	–	44	–	2
OF	Harry Walden	18	–	2	–	–	–	3	–	–	21	–	2
IF	Dennis Brown	8	–	3	–	–	–	–	–	–	8	–	3
IF	Don Martin	31	–	13	1	–	–	6	–	5	38	–	18
IF	Graham Moore	32	–	3	–	–	–	4	1	2	36	1	5
IF	Ray Price	1	–	–	–	–	–	–	–	–	1	–	–
CF	Jim Hall	13	–	1	–	–	–	2	–	2	15	–	3
CF	Frank Large	21	–	8	–	–	–	–	–	–	21	–	8
Players who left before end of season:
GK	Bill Brown	17	–	–	1	–	–	3	–	–	21	–	–
FB	Mike Everitt	13	–	–	1	–	–	3	–	–	17	–	–
IF	Bobby Jones	17	–	1	1	–	–	–	–	–	18	–	1
CF	Bobby Brown	3	–	–	–	–	–	1	–	1	4	–	1
CF	George Hudson	7	–	–	–	–	–	2	–	–	9	–	–
