= 1961–62 Northampton Town F.C. season =

Northampton Town
1961–62 season
- Chairman: Fred York
- Manager: Dave Bowen
- Stadium: County Ground
- Division Three: 8th
- FA Cup: Third round
- League Cup: First round
- Top goalscorer: League: Cliff Holton (36); All: Cliff Holton (39)
- Highest home attendance: 18,825 vs Kettering Town
- Lowest home attendance: 7,563 vs Bradford PA
- Average home league attendance: 11,250

The 1961–62 season was Northampton Town's 65th season in their history and the first season in the Third Division, following promotion from the Fourth Division the previous season. Alongside competing in Division Three, the club also participated in the FA Cup and League Cup.

== Players ==
As of match played 27 April 1962.

Name	Position	Nat.	Place of Birth	Date of Birth (Age)	Apps	Goals	Previous club	Date signed	Fee
Goalkeepers
Chic Brodie	GK	(Scotland)	Duntocher	22 February 1937 (aged 25)	35	0	Wolverhampton Wanderers	September 1961	
Norman Coe	GK	(Wales)	Swansea	6 December 1940 (aged 21)	45	0	Arsenal	July 1960	
Full backs
Tony Haskins	LB	(England)	Northampton	26 July 1935 (aged 26)	8	0	Belper Town	August 1959	
Ron Patterson	LB	(England)	Gateshead	30 October 1929 (aged 32)	317	5	Middlesbrough	Summer 1952	
Arnold Woollard	LB	(Bermuda)	Pembroke	24 August 1930 (aged 31)	13	0	Bournemouth	March 1962	
Theo Foley	RB	(Republic of Ireland)	Dublin	2 April 1937 (aged 25)	49	0	Exeter City	May 1961	£1,000
Half backs
Terry Branston	CH	(England)	Rugby	25 July 1938 (aged 23)	66	0	Apprentice	October 1958	N/A
Alec Carson	WH	(Scotland)	Clarkston	12 November 1942 (aged 19)	8	0	Apprentice	November 1959	N/A
Barry Cooke	WH	(England)	Wolverhampton	12 January 1938 (aged 24)	64	2	West Bromwich Albion	July 1959	
Mike Everitt	WH	(England)	Weeley	16 January 1941 (aged 21)	57	9	Arsenal	February 1961	£4,000
Derek Leck	WH	(England)	Deal	8 February 1937 (aged 25)	128	34	Millwall	June 1958	
Roly Mills	WH	(England)	Daventry	22 June 1933 (aged 28)	280	30	Apprentice	May 1951	N/A
Inside/Outside forwards
Cecil Dixon	OF	(England)	Trowbridge	28 March 1935 (aged 27)	16	4	Newport County	August 1961	
Barry Lines	OF	(England)	Bletchley	16 May 1942 (aged 19)	69	20	Bletchley Town	September 1960	
Tommy Robson	OF	(England)	Gateshead	31 July 1944 (aged 17)	4	1	Newcastle United	August 1961	N/A
Derek Woods	OF	(England)	Northampton	23 March 1941 (aged 21)	6	2	Apprentice	June 1959	N/A
Brian Etheridge	IF	(England)	Northampton	4 March 1944 (aged 18)	1	0	Apprentice	July 1961	N/A
Jimmy Moran	IF	(Scotland)	Cleland	6 March 1935 (aged 27)	25	7	Norwich City	January 1961	
John Reid	IF	(Scotland)	Newmains	20 August 1932 (aged 29)	26	3	Bradford City	November 1961	
Centre forwards
Bob Edwards	CF	(England)	Guildford	22 May 1931 (aged 30)	23	10	Norwich City	March 1961	
Cliff Holton (c)	CF	(England)	Oxford	29 April 1929 (aged 32)	44	39	Watford	September 1961	

== Competitions ==
=== Division Three ===
==== League table ====
Pos	Team	Pld	W	D	L	GF	GA	GAv	Pts
6	Bristol City	46	23	8	15	94	72	1.306	54
7	Reading	46	22	9	15	77	66	1.167	53
8	Northampton Town	46	20	11	15	85	57	1.491	51
9	Swindon Town	46	17	15	14	78	71	1.099	49
10	Hull City	46	20	8	18	67	54	1.241	48

==== Results summary ====
Overall								Home						Away					
Pld	W	D	L	GF	GA	GAv	Pts	W	D	L	GF	GA	Pts	W	D	L	GF	GA	Pts
46	20	11	15	85	57	1.491	51	12	6	5	52	24	30	8	5	10	33	33	21

Last updated: 5 December 2020.

==== League position by match ====
Round	1	2	3	4	5	6	7	8	9	10	11	12	13	14	15	16	17	18	19	20	21	22	23	24	25	26	27	28	29	30	31	32	33	34	35	36	37	38	39	40	41	42	43	44	45	46
Ground	A	A	A	H	H	A	H	A	A	H	A	A	H	A	A	H	H	A	H	H	A	A	H	H	H	A	A	A	H	H	A	H	H	A	H	A	H	H	A	H	A	A	H	A	H	A
Result	D	L	L	L	D	W	D	W	L	L	L	W	W	W	L	W	D	W	D	W	W	L	W	W	W	L	D	D	L	L	D	W	W	L	W	W	D	W	D	W	L	W	W	L	D	L
Position	12	19	21	23	23	18	18	14	17	18	19	19	17	14	16	12	11	9	11	8	6	9	8	8	5	7	8	9	9	10	10	7	8	9	8	8	8	7	7	7	7	7	6	7	7	8

Source: 11v11.com
A = Away; H = Home; W = Win; D = Draw; L = Loss

==== Matches ====
Win Draw Loss

19 August 1961 1	Watford	0–0	Northampton Town	Watford
15:00 BST				Stadium: Vicarage Road; Attendance: 16,849

22 August 1961 2	Bristol City	1–0	Northampton Town	Bristol
19:30 BST				Stadium: Ashton Gate; Attendance: 14,415; Referee: Harry New

26 August 1961 3	Hull City	1–0	Northampton Town	Kingston upon Hull
15:00 BST				Stadium: Boothferry Park; Attendance: 8,027

29 August 1961 4	Northampton Town	0–1	Bristol City	Northampton
BST				Stadium: County Ground; Attendance: 12,832

2 September 1961 5	Northampton Town	1–1	Port Vale	Northampton
BST	P.Terry		B.Llewellyn	Stadium: County Ground; Attendance: 9,573

6 September 1961 6	Crystal Palace	1–4	Northampton Town	Selhurst, London
BST			C.Holton; P.Terry	Stadium: Selhurst Park; Attendance: 25,535

9 September 1961 7	Northampton Town	2–2	Lincoln City	Northampton
BST	C.Dixon			Stadium: County Ground; Attendance: 11,850

16 September 1961 8	Torquay United	1–2	Northampton Town	Torquay
15:00 BST			C.Holton; P.Terry	Stadium: Plainmoor; Attendance: 5,707

18 September 1961 9	Northampton Town	0–3	Bournemouth & Boscombe Athletic	Northampton
19:15 BST				Stadium: County Ground; Attendance: 14,350

23 September 1961 10	Northampton Town	1–2	Swindon Town	Northampton
15:00 BST	C.Holton 90'	Report	R.Hunt 46'; E.Hunt 79'	Stadium: County Ground; Attendance: 9,263; Referee: N Hough

27 September 1961 11	Bournemouth & Boscombe Athletic	3–2	Northampton Town	Bournemouth
19:15 BST			C.Holton	Stadium: Dean Court; Attendance: 14,112

30 September 1961 12	Halifax Town	1–3	Northampton Town	Halifax
BST			D.Leck; B.Lines	Stadium: The Shay; Attendance: 5,737

3 October 1961 13	Northampton Town	3–1	Barnsley	Northampton
BST	C.Holton; P.Terry			Stadium: County Ground; Attendance: 11,448

7 October 1961 14	Bradford (Park Avenue)	1–2	Northampton Town	Halifax
BST			C.Holton; B.Lines; T.Foley (red card)	Stadium: The Shay; Attendance: 10,738

11 October 1961 15	Barnsley	3–2	Northampton Town	Barnsley
BST			C.Holton	Stadium: Oakwell; Attendance: 10,738

14 October 1961 16	Northampton Town	7–0	Grimsby Town	Northampton
BST	C.Holton; D.Leck; R.Spelman; B.Edwards; R.Mills			Stadium: County Ground; Attendance: 11,201

17 October 1961 17	Northampton Town	1–1	Crystal Palace	Northampton
BST	C.Holton			Stadium: County Ground; Attendance: 13,827

21 October 1961 18	Shrewsbury Town	1–3	Northampton Town	Shrewsbury
BST			C.Holton; B.Edwards; R.Mills	Stadium: Gay Meadow; Attendance: 6,872

28 October 1961 19	Northampton Town	2–2	Peterborough United	Northampton
BST	M.Everitt; C.Holton			Stadium: County Ground; Attendance: 17,324

11 November 1961 20	Northampton Town	5–0	Newport County	Northampton
GMT	C.Holton; B.Lines; J.Reid			Stadium: County Ground; Attendance: 7,845

18 November 1961 21	Southend United	1–3	Northampton Town	Southend-on-Sea
GMT			C.Holton } R.Spelman; P.Terry	Stadium: Roots Hall; Attendance: 5,974

2 December 1961 22	Coventry City	1–0	Northampton Town	Coventry
GMT	M.Dixon	Report		Stadium: Highfield Road; Attendance: 13,693

9 December 1961 23	Northampton Town	5–0	Brentford	Northampton
GMT	C.Holton; B.Lines; P.Terry			Stadium: County Ground; Attendance: 10,059

16 December 1961 24	Northampton Town	2–0	Watford	Northampton
GMT	P.Terry			Stadium: County Ground; Attendance: 12,509

23 December 1961 25	Northampton Town	2–0	Hull City	Northampton
GMT	B.Lines; P.Terry			Stadium: County Ground; Attendance: 10,203

26 December 1961 26	Portsmouth	4–1	Northampton Town	Portsmouth
15:00 GMT			B.Lines	Stadium: Fratton Park; Attendance: 17,428

13 January 1962 27	Port Vale	1–1	Northampton Town	Burslem
GMT	B.Llewellyn		C.Holton	Stadium: Vale Park; Attendance: 8,229

20 January 1962 28	Lincoln City	0–0	Northampton Town	Lincoln
15:00 GMT				Stadium: Sincil Bank; Attendance: 5,720

27 January 1962 29	Northampton Town	1–2	Notts County	Northampton
GMT	B.Lines			Stadium: County Ground; Attendance: 11,813

3 February 1962 30	Northampton Town	1–2	Torquay United	Northampton
GMT	B.Lines			Stadium: County Ground; Attendance: 8,910

10 February 1962 31	Swindon Town	2–2	Northampton Town	Swindon
15:00 GMT	J.Smith 65'; B.Atkins 77'	Report	C.Holton 30'; M.Everitt 80'	Stadium: County Ground; Attendance: 8,985; Referee: J R Osborne

17 February 1962 32	Northampton Town	3–1	Halifax Town	Northampton
GMT	C.Holton; B.Lines; J.Reid			Stadium: County Ground; Attendance: 7,900

24 February 1962 33	Northampton Town	2–0	Bradford (Park Avenue)	Northampton
GMT	C.Holton; J.Reid			Stadium: County Ground; Attendance: 7,563; Referee: Reg Leafe

3 March 1962 34	Grimsby	3–2	Northampton Town	Cleethorpes
15:00 GMT			C.Holton	Stadium: Blundell Park; Attendance: 9,318

10 March 1962 35	Northampton Town	3–1	Shrewsbury Town	Northampton
GMT	C.Dixon; B.Lines o.g.'			Stadium: County Ground; Attendance: 8,173

17 March 1962 36	Peterborough United	0–2	Northampton Town	Peterborough
15:00 GMT			M.Everitt; T.Robson	Stadium: London Road; Attendance: 17,009

20 March 1962 37	Northampton Town	2–2	Portsmouth	Northampton
GMT	C.Dixon; M.Everitt			Stadium: County Ground; Attendance: 13,622

24 March 1962 38	Northampton Town	1–0	Reading	Northampton
GMT	C.Holton			Stadium: County Ground; Attendance: 9,473

31 March 1962 39	Newport County	0–0	Northampton Town	Newport, Wales
BST				Stadium: Somerton Park; Attendance: 2,568

7 April 1962 40	Northampton Town	3–1	Southend United	Northampton
BST	M.Everitt; C.Holton; B.Lines			Stadium: County Ground; Attendance: 7,657

11 April 1962 41	Reading	2–0	Northampton Town	Reading
BST				Stadium: Elm Park; Attendance: 5,586

14 April 1962 42	Notts County	1–4	Northampton Town	Nottingham
BST			C.Holton; D.Woods	Stadium: Meadow Lane; Attendance: 5,974

21 April 1962 43	Northampton Town	4–1	Coventry City	Northampton
BST	C.Holton; B.Lines; D.Woods	Report	R.Dwight	Stadium: County Ground; Attendance: 10,388

23 April 1962 44	Queens Park Rangers	2–0	Northampton Town	White City, London
15:15 BST				Stadium: Loftus Road; Attendance: 10,953

24 April 1962 45	Northampton Town	1–1	Queens Park Rangers	Northampton
19:30 BST	C.Holton			Stadium: County Ground; Attendance: 12,533

27 April 1962 46	Brentford	3–0	Northampton Town	Brentford, London
19:30 BST	G.Francis; J.Brooks; G.Summers			Stadium: Griffin Park; Attendance: 6,715

=== FA Cup ===
4 November 1961 First round	Northampton Town	2–0	Millwall	Northampton
GMT	B.Lines; P.Terry			Stadium: County Ground; Attendance: 11,844

25 November 1961 Second round	Northampton Town	3–0	Kettering Town	Northampton
GMT	C.Holton			Stadium: County Ground; Attendance: 18,825

6 January 1962 Third round	Port Vale	3–1	Northampton Town	Burslem
GMT			J.Moran	Stadium: Vale Park; Attendance: 19,442

=== League Cup ===
13 September 1961 First round	Luton Town	2–1	Northampton Town	Luton
19:00 BST			B.Cooke	Stadium: Kenilworth Road

=== Appearances and goals ===
Pos	Player	Division Three		FA Cup		League Cup		Total	
Pos	Player	Starts	Goals	Starts	Goals	Starts	Goals	Starts	Goals
GK	Chic Brodie	32	–	3	–	–	–	50	–
GK	Norman Coe	14	–	–	–	–	–	14	–
FB	Theo Foley	46	–	2	–	1	–	49	–
FB	Tony Haskins	1	–	–	–	–	–	1	–
FB	Ron Patterson	2	–	–	–	–	–	2	–
FB	Arnold Woollard	13	–	–	–	–	–	13	–
HB	Terry Branston	45	–	3	–	1	–	49	–
HB	Alec Carson	7	–	–	–	–	–	7	–
HB	Barry Cooke	2	–	–	–	1	1	3	1
HB	Mike Everitt	37	5	3	–	1	–	41	5
HB	Derek Leck	46	2	3	–	1	–	50	2
HB	Roly Mills	35	2	3	–	1	–	39	2
OF	Cecil Dixon	15	4	–	–	1	–	16	4
OF	Barry Lines	38	14	3	1	1	–	42	15
OF	Tommy Robson	4	1	–	–	–	–	4	1
OF	Derek Woods	6	2	–	–	–	–	6	2
IF	Brian Etheridge	1	–	–	–	–	–	1	–
IF	Jimmy Moran	9	1	1	1	–	–	10	2
IF	John Reid	26	3	–	–	–	–	26	3
CF	Bob Edwards	10	2	1	–	–	–	11	2
CF	Cliff Holton	41	36	3	3	–	–	44	39
Players who left before end of season:
GK	Brian Caine	–	–	–	–	1	–	1	–
FB	Tony Claypole	22	–	2	–	1	–	25	–
OF	Tommy Fowler	5	–	–	–	–	–	5	–
OF	Ron Spelman	23	2	3	–	–	–	26	2
IF	Dennis Clapton	1	–	–	–	–	–	1	–
IF	Mike Wright	1	–	–	–	–	–	1	–
CF	Pat Terry	24	10	3	1	1	–	28	11
