= Brian Etheridge =

Brian Etheridge may refer to:

- Brian Etheridge, character in comic book series V for Vendetta
- Brian Etheridge (footballer) (born 1944), retired English footballer
