= Brian Etheridge (footballer) =

English footballer (1944–2011)

Personal information
- Full name: Brian George Etheridge
- Date of birth: 4 March 1944
- Place of birth: Northampton, England
- Date of death: 26 March 2011 (aged 67)
- Place of death: Moulton, England
- Positions: Midfielder; inside left

Youth career
- 1960–1962: Northampton Town

Senior career*
Years	Team	Apps	(Gls)
1962–1966	Northampton Town	17	(1)
1966–1967	Brentford	22	(2)
1967–1969	Daring Club de Bruxelles	40	(4)
1969–1970	Cercle Brugge	26	(0)
1970	Bedford Town	6	(0)
- Corby Town
- Wellingborough Town
- Rushden Town

International career
1962	England Youth	8	(2)

Managerial career
- Corby Town (player-manager)
- Wellingborough Town (player-manager)
- Rushden Town (player-manager)
- * Club domestic league appearances and goals

Brian George Etheridge (4 March 1944 – 26 March 2011) was an English professional footballer and manager. He played in the Football League for Northampton Town and Brentford and later played in Belgium. He managed non-League clubs Corby Town, Wellingborough Town and Rushden Town.

== Playing career ==
=== Northampton Town ===
Etheridge began his career at hometown Fourth Division club Northampton Town. Northampton's ascension to the First Division by the end of the 1964–65 season harmed Etheridge's first team chances, with his best appearance tally being 10 during that season. He departed the club in February 1966, after making just 22 appearances and scoring one goal during 4 1/2 seasons at the County Ground.

=== Brentford ===
Etheridge joined Third Division club Brentford in February 1966 for a £8,000 fee and quickly won a place in the team. A poor 1965–66 season culminated in relegation to the Fourth Division, with Etheridge having made 16 appearances. Etheridge found himself in the reserve team during the 1966–67 season and made just eight first team appearances. He experienced some joy with the reserves and won the 1966–67 London Challenge Cup with the team. Etheridge departed the Bees at the end of the 1966–67 season, after making 24 appearances and scoring two goals during 18 months at Griffin Park.

=== Daring Club de Bruxelles ===
During the 1967 off-season, Etheridge moved to Belgium to sign for First Division club Daring Club de Bruxelles, managed by Englishman Billy Elliott. He played in roughly half the club's matches and made 14 appearances and scored one goal during the 1967–68 season. He broke into the team in the following season and 28 appearances, scoring three goals and making appearances in Daring's 1968–69 Fairs Cup campaign. Despite European football, a disastrous season saw the club relegated to the Second Division. Etheridge departed Daring at the end of the campaign, after making 40 league appearances and scoring four goals for the club.

=== Cercle Brugge ===
Etheridge transferred to Second Division club Cercle Brugge prior to the beginning of the 1969–70 season. In a one-season stay, he made 26 appearances and scored no goals.

=== Non-League football ===
Etheridge returned to England in 1970 and joined Southern League Premier Division club Bedford Town. He failed to last with the club and dropped down to the Southern League First Division to sign for Corby Town in November 1970. He ended his playing career with Southern League club Wellingborough Town and United Counties League outfit Rushden Town.

== Management career ==
While at Corby Town, Wellingborough Town and Rushden Town, Etheridge combined his playing duties with that of managing each club.

== International career ==
Etheridge won eight caps and scored two goals for England Youth. He was joined in the team by fellow Cobblers graduates Tommy Robson and Graham Carr.

== Personal life ==
Etheridge was married to Pauline and had two children. Etheridge's grandson, Tom Collins, is a rugby union winger and full back and was capped by England at U20 level . After leaving professional football, Etheridge became a businessman and was a partner in a packaging firm, based in Wales. Etheridge hanged himself at his home in March 2011, having suffered from depression and made several attempts on his life previously.

== Career statistics ==
Appearances and goals by club, season and competition
Club	Season	League			National cup (Note: Includes FA Cup, Belgian Cup)		League cup (Note: Includes Football League Cup)		Total	
Club	Season	Division	Apps	Goals	Apps	Goals	Apps	Goals	Apps	Goals
Northampton Town	1961–62	Third Division	1	0	0	0	0	0	1	0
Northampton Town	1963–64	Second Division	5	0	1	0	1	0	7	0
Northampton Town	1964–65	Second Division	9	1	0	0	1	0	10	1
Northampton Town	1965–66	First Division	0	0	0	0	1	0	1	0
Northampton Town	Total		15	1	1	0	3	0	19	1
Brentford	1965–66	Third Division	16	2	—		—		16	2
Brentford	1966–67	Fourth Division	6	0	2	0	0	0	8	0
Brentford	Total		22	2	2	0	0	0	24	2
Cercle Brugge	1969–70	Belgian Second Division	26	0	4	0	—		30	0
Bedford Town	1970–71	Southern League Premier Division	5	0	1	0	—		6	0
Career total			68	3	8	0	3	0	79	3

== Honours ==
Brentford

- London Challenge Cup: 1966–67
