= James Caine =

English footballer

Personal information
- Date of birth: 24 June 1908
- Place of birth: Brierfield, England
- Date of death: 9 May 1971 (aged 62)
- Place of death: Nelson, England
- Position: Defender

Senior career*
Years	Team	Apps	(Gls)
1927–1929	Burnley	0	(0)
1929–1931	Nelson	5	(0)
1931–1932	Bury	0	(0)
1932–1935	Barnoldswick Town	?	(?)
- * Club domestic league appearances and goals

James Caine (24 June 1908 – 9 May 1971) was an English professional footballer who played as a central defender. He was on the books of three Football League clubs, but only played in the first-team for Nelson, where he made five league appearances. After leaving Bury in 1932, he spent some time in non-league football, before retiring to work in a factory.

== Biography ==
Caine was born in the town Brierfield, Lancashire on 24 June 1908. After retiring from professional football, he worked in the William Fell & Co. weaving factory in nearby Nelson. Caine had six sons, and his son Brian also went on to become a professional footballer with Barrow. James Caine died in his home in Walton Lane, Nelson, on 9 May 1971, at the age of 62.

== Football career ==
As a youth, Caine played football with Brierfield Schoolboys before joining Football League First Division outfit Burnley in December 1927. He failed to break into the first team squad and left the club at the beginning of the 1929–30 season in order to join Third Division North side Nelson. He initially played in the reserves, but was widely expected to become an integral part of the team. Caine made his professional debut on 1 March 1930 in the 0–3 defeat away at Doncaster Rovers, as a replacement for regular centre-half Jim Metcalfe. He also appeared in the 0–2 loss to Chesterfield at Seedhill the following week, before returning to the reserves for the remainder of the season.

In the 1930–31 campaign, Nelson's last in the Football League, Caine played in the loss against Lincoln City on 15 September 1930, and helped the team to a 2–2 draw with New Brighton five days later. A lengthy spell in the reserves followed, with Caine failing to make the first team squad during the next seven months. He returned to the starting line-up for the home match against Southport on 18 April 1931, but he could not prevent the team being beaten 1–4. Nelson finished bottom of the Third Division North in 1931 and failed re-election to the Football League. Subsequently, all professional players left the club and Caine joined local side Brierfield RC before joining Bury on a free transfer in August 1931. However, he failed to make a first-team appearance for his new club and later signed for non-league Barnoldswick Town. In January 1935, he retired from competitive football to begin work at the William Fell & Co. factory.
