= George Sharples =

English footballer (1943–2020)

Personal information
- Full name: George Frank Vincent Sharples
- Date of birth: 20 September 1943
- Place of birth: Ellesmere Port, England
- Date of death: 14 December 2020 (aged 77)
- Position: Wing half

Senior career*
Years	Team	Apps	(Gls)
1960–1964	Everton	10	(0)
1964–1969	Blackburn Rovers	103	(5)
1971–1972	Southport	25	(0)
Total		138	(5)
- * Club domestic league appearances and goals

George Frank Vincent Sharples (20 September 1943 – 14 December 2020) was an English footballer who played in the Football League as a wing half for Everton, Blackburn Rovers and Southport. He was a schoolboy international and represented England at youth level.

Sharples died on 14 December 2020, aged 77.
