= Billy Hails =

English footballer (1935–2017)

Personal information
- Date of birth: 19 February 1935
- Place of birth: Nettlesworth, England
- Date of death: 19 March 2017 (aged 82)
- Place of death: Watford, England

Managerial career
- Years: Team
- 1978–1979: Peterborough United (interim)

Billy Hails (19 February 1935 – 19 March 2017) was an English professional footballer.

Hails was born in Nettlesworth, County Durham. He joined Peterborough United from Lincoln City in 1955, where he won the Midland League five times and won the Fourth Division in the 1960–61 season. He made 318 appearances and scored 114 goals for Peterborough before leaving for Northampton Town in 1962, with whom he won the Third Division in the 1962–63 season.

After leaving Northampton, Hails had spells with Luton Town, Nuneaton Borough, and Rugby. He returned to Peterborough in the late 1960s as a member of coaching staff, and was an assistant to manager John Barnwell in 1977. Hails took over from Barnwell as manager in 1978, managing nine games until Peter Morris took over in February 1979. Hails joined Watford in 1979 and was part of the backroom staff under Graham Taylor in the 1980s.

Hails died in Watford on 19 March 2017, aged 82, having suffered from Alzheimer's disease in his last years.

Hails was inducted into the Peterborough United FC 'Hall of Fame' in April 2017.
