= Brian Caine =

English footballer (born 1936)

Personal information
- Date of birth: 20 June 1936 (age 90)
- Place of birth: Nelson, England
- Position: Goalkeeper

Youth career
- Accrington Stanley

Senior career*
Years	Team	Apps	(Gls)
1957–1958	Blackpool	1	(0)
1960–1961	Coventry City	1	(0)
1961	Northampton Town	0	(0)
1961–1964	Barrow	109	(0)
	Cambridge City	?	(?)
- * Club domestic league appearances and goals

Brian Caine (born 20 June 1936) is an English former professional association football goalkeeper. His six siblings all played football, but he was the only to appear at a professional level. Caine started his career as an amateur with Accrington Stanley, before joining Blackpool and later Coventry City. In 1961, he signed for Barrow, and went on to play over 100 league games for the club.

== Biography ==
Caine was born on 20 June 1936 in Nelson, Lancashire, in north-west England. He is one of six sons of former professional footballer James Caine, who played as a defender for Nelson in the Football League in the late 1920s.

== Football career ==
As a young player, Caine was on the books of Accrington Stanley. However, he failed to break into the first-team squad and played as an amateur during his spell with the club. In 1957, he was signed by fellow Lancashire side Blackpool, who at the time played in the Football League First Division. Caine found senior opportunities limited, and appeared in only one league match for Blackpool before leaving in 1958. Two years later, he signed for Football League Third Division outfit Coventry City. Again, he made a single first-team appearance during his time at the club. Caine then had a short spell at Northampton Town, but did not play any league matches before leaving to join Barrow.

Caine stayed at Holker Street for three seasons, cementing his place as the first-choice goalkeeper throughout his stay. During the 1963–64 campaign, his last with the club, Caine played 45 matches for the Barrow first-team, the joint most appearances out of the entire squad. Upon leaving Barrow in the summer of 1964, he moved into non-league football with Cambridge City.
