= Ken Wimshurst =

English footballer

Personal information
- Full name: Kenneth Pinkney Wimshurst
- Date of birth: 23 March 1938
- Place of birth: South Shields, England
- Date of death: 6 July 2017 (aged 79)
- Height: 5 ft 10 in (1.78 m)
- Position: Right half

Youth career
- South Shields

Senior career*
Years	Team	Apps	(Gls)
1957–1958	Newcastle United	0	(0)
1958–1960	Gateshead	7	(0)
1960–1961	Wolverhampton Wanderers	0	(0)
1961–1967	Southampton	152	(9)
1967–1972	Bristol City	149	(9)
- * Club domestic league appearances and goals

Kenneth Pinkney Wimshurst (23 March 1938 – 6 July 2017) was an English footballer who played as a right half. He made over 300 Football League appearances in the years after the Second World War.

== Career ==
Ken Wimshurst played locally for South Shields. Wimshurst moved from South Shields to Newcastle United in July 1957 but failed to breakthrough to the League side who escaped relegation from the First Division only on superior goal average. Wimshurst moved to Gateshead in November 1958. Gateshead struggling at the foot of the Fourth Division finished 20th in the 1958–59 season. However season 1959–60 proved to be the last in the Football League for Gateshead although they finished only 22nd of the 24 sides in the Fourth Division when Peterborough United were elected to replace them. Wimshurst joined Wolverhampton Wanderers from Gateshead in November 1960. Again failing to reach the first team at Wolves Wimshurst was signed for £1,500 by Southampton in July 1961. Alan Dicks signed Wimshurst in October 1967 from Southampton for Bristol City for £15,000.

After retiring from playing football Ken Wimshurst remained at Bristol City as assistant coach to John Sillett in July 1972. When Sillett left in 1974 Wimshurst became chief coach at Bristol City. Wimshurst left Bristol City in June 1981 and briefly assisted Don Mackay at Dundee. In 1997 Wimshurst was running Southampton's School of Excellence at Bath.

His son in law Ricky Chandler played for Bristol City from 1980 to 1983 before moving to Bath City.

Wimshurst died on 6 July 2017, aged 79.

== Honours ==
Southampton

- Football League Second Division runners-up: 1965–66
