= Charlie Livesey =

English footballer

Personal information
- Full name: Charles Edward Livesey
- Date of birth: 6 February 1938
- Place of birth: West Ham, England
- Date of death: 26 February 2005 (aged 67)
- Place of death: London, England
- Height: 5 ft 10 in (1.78 m)
- Position: Centre forward

Youth career
- West Ham United
- Custom House

Senior career*
Years	Team	Apps	(Gls)
1956–1959	Southampton	25	(14)
1959–1961	Chelsea	39	(17)
1961–1962	Gillingham	47	(17)
1962–1964	Watford	64	(26)
1964–1965	Northampton Town	28	(4)
1965–1969	Brighton & Hove Albion	126	(28)
1969–1970	Crawley Town		
- * Club domestic league appearances and goals

Charles Edward Livesey (6 February 1938 – 26 February 2005) was a footballer who played for Chelsea in Football League Division 1 between 1959 and 1961, as well as appearing for various clubs in all four divisions of the Football League.
