= Graham Moore (footballer) =

Welsh footballer

Personal information
- Full name: Graham Moore
- Date of birth: 7 March 1941
- Place of birth: Hengoed, Wales
- Date of death: 9 February 2016 (aged 74)
- Position: Midfielder

Youth career
- 1956–1957: Bargoed YMCA

Senior career*
Years	Team	Apps	(Gls)
1957–1961	Cardiff City	85	(23)
1961–1963	Chelsea	68	(13)
1963–1964	Manchester United	18	(4)
1964–1967	Northampton Town	53	(10)
1967–1971	Charlton Athletic	110	(8)
1971–1974	Doncaster Rovers	69	(3)
Total		403	(61)

International career
1959–1970	Wales	21	(1)
- * Club domestic league appearances and goals

Graham Moore (7 March 1941 – 9 February 2016) was a Welsh footballer. During a 16-year playing career, he made over 400 appearances in The Football League, scoring 61 goals, and attained 21 caps for Wales.

== Early life ==
Moore was born in Hengoed and attended Gilfach Primary and Bargoed Secondary schools. After leaving school he began working alongside his father and brother at Penallta Colliery.

== Club career ==
In 1956, Moore joined Bargoed YMCA, where he spent one year playing for the club's under-16 side before he was spotted by Cardiff City, joining the club along with teammates Tommy Mills and Graham Franklin. After playing for a year in the reserve side, he made his debut for the club at 17, scoring a last-minute equaliser in a 2–2 draw with Brighton & Hove Albion in September 1958. The following year, he made 41 league appearances, helping Cardiff win promotion to Division One. With Cardiff struggling financially, Moore signed for Chelsea for £35,000 in December 1961, and helped the Blues win promotion to the First Division. He made 72 appearances for Chelsea, scoring 14 goals. In 1963 he was sold to Manchester United for £35,000.

His time at United was hampered by injuries and he left the club a year later after making 18 league appearances. Moore then joined Northampton Town, playing for the club in their only top-flight season, before playing for Charlton Athletic and Doncaster Rovers.

== International career ==
Moore made his debut for Wales at the age of 18 on 17 October 1959 in a 1–1 draw with England, scoring Wales' goal. He went on to win a total of 21 caps.

=== International goals ===
Results list Wales' goal tally first.

Goal	Date	Venue	Opponent	Result	Competition
1	17 October 1959	Ninian Park, Cardiff, Wales	England	1–1	1960 British Home Championship

== Awards and honours ==
Moore was named BBC Wales Sports Personality of the Year in 1959.
