= Joe Kiernan =

Scottish footballer

Personal information
- Date of birth: 22 October 1942
- Place of birth: Coatbridge, Scotland
- Date of death: August 2006 (age 64)
- Place of death: Northampton, England
- Position: Left half

Senior career*
Years	Team	Apps	(Gls)
19??–1962	Sunderland	1	(0)
1962–1972	Northampton Town	308	(13)
1972–19??	Kettering Town		
Total		309	(13)
- * Club domestic league appearances and goals

Joe Kiernan (22 October 1942 – August 2006) was a Scottish professional footballer who played 352 matches for Northampton Town. He played either on the left side of defence or midfield.

== Career ==
In 1958, Kiernan joined Sunderland as an apprentice and made two appearances for the first team netting twice in a League cup game versus Oldham Athletic. He then joined Northampton Town in 1963 for £2,000. He was one of the leading players on the club's books when they went into Division One. He was on the verge of becoming a Scottish international however as the Cobblers were relegated down the divisions. During the 1966-67 season he underwent two cartilage operations. Kiernan made 42 appearances in Division One. He was released prematurely in 1972 and joined Kettering Town where he captained them under Ron Atkinson to the Championship of the Southern League Division One North. He later turned to coaching, firstly with Irthlingborough Diamonds and in 1986 he took over the running of the Cobblers youth team under Graham Carr. When Theo Foley was appointed manager in 1990, he made Kiernan his number two but the club drifted into administration and Kiernan returned to his trade as a painter and decorator. He died in August 2006.
