= John Reid (footballer, born 1932) =

Scottish footballer

Personal information
- Full name: John Reid
- Date of birth: 20 August 1932
- Place of birth: Newmains, Scotland
- Date of death: September 2021 (aged 88)
- Place of death: Bradford, England
- Position: Inside forward

Youth career
- Kello Rovers

Senior career*
Years	Team	Apps	(Gls)
1954–1957	Hamilton Academical	74	(17)
1957–1961	Bradford City	147	(32)
1961–1963	Northampton Town	85	(14)
1963–1966	Luton Town	111	(7)
1966–1967	Torquay United	23	(1)
1967–1968	Rochdale	39	(3)
Total		479	(74)
- * Club domestic league appearances and goals

John Reid (20 August 1932 – September 2021) was a Scottish professional footballer who played as an inside forward. Active in both Scotland and England, Reid made nearly 500 career league appearances between 1954 and 1968, scoring nearly 100 goals.

== Career ==
Born in Newmains, Reid began his career with Kello Rovers. After turning professional in 1954, Reid played for Hamilton Academical, Bradford City, Northampton Town, Luton Town, Torquay United and Rochdale.
