= Walgrave =

Village in Northamptonshire, England

Coordinates: 52.3447°N 0.8197°W

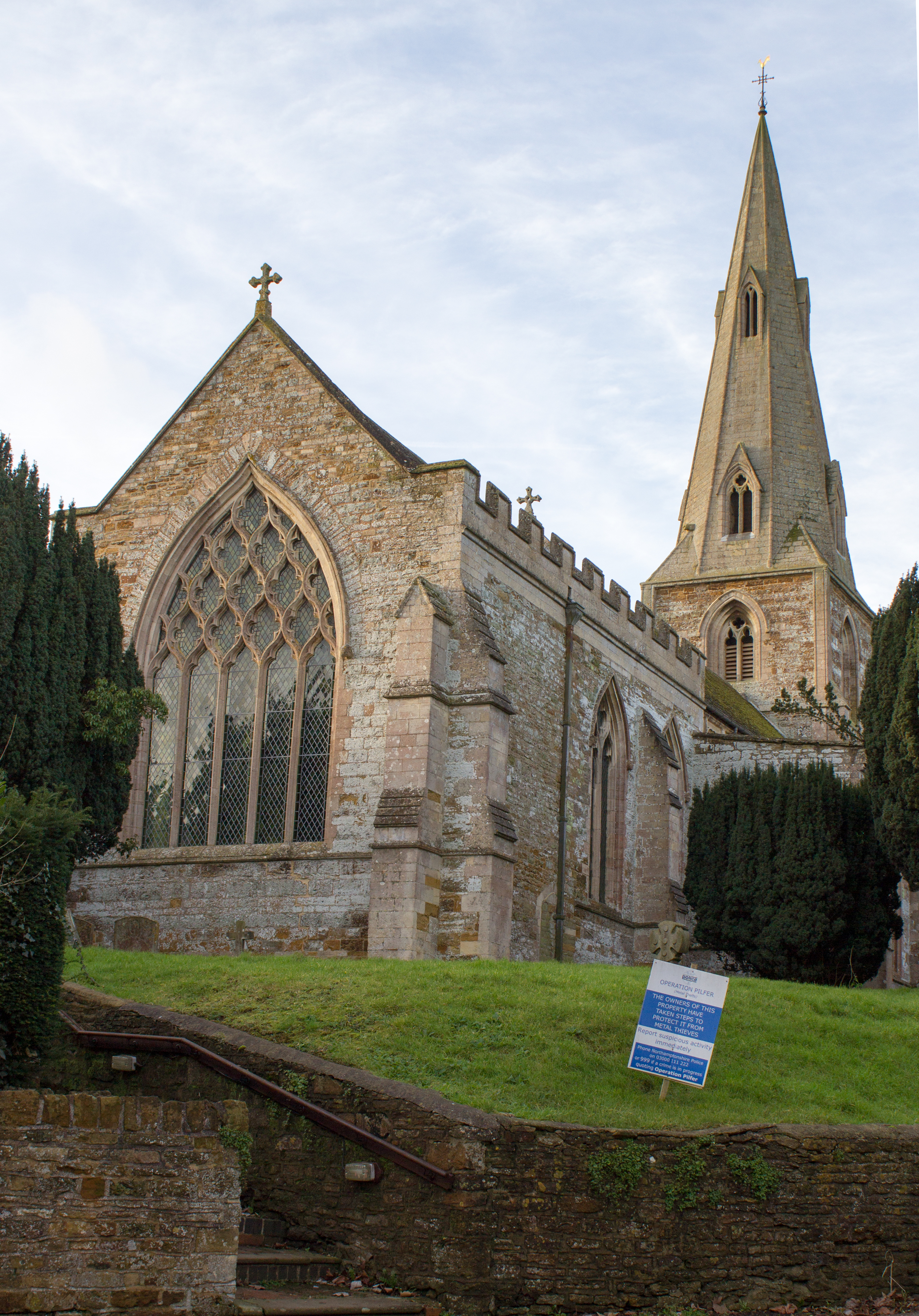
- Church of St Peter, Walgrave, 2014

- Location within Northamptonshire
- Population: 868 (2011)
- OS grid reference: SP8072
  - London: 76 miles (122 km)
- Unitary authority: West Northamptonshire
- Ceremonial county: Northamptonshire
- Region: East Midlands
- Country: England
- Sovereign state: United Kingdom
- Post town: Northampton
- Postcode district: NN6
- Dialling code: 01604
- Police: Northamptonshire
- Fire: Northamptonshire
- Ambulance: East Midlands
- UK Parliament: Daventry

Walgrave is a village and civil parish in West Northamptonshire, England. At the time of the 2001 census, the parish's population was 822 people, increasing to 868 at the 2011 Census.

The village's name means 'Old's grove'. The village of Old is nearby and the main component is likely to be the same.

== Landmarks ==
St Peter's, a sandstone-spired church, is in the centre of the village. Throughout the autumn and winter, residents make donations to illuminate the church from 8.30pm. The west tower is 13th century, but the church is mostly 14th century. There is a monument to Mountague Lane, died in 1670. Walgrave is part of a united benefice which also includes the parishes of Hannington, Old and Scaldwell with each village retaining its own church. In the mid-1950s, a walrus supposedly was living in one of the creeks near the village, but was never captured.

The rectory, east of the church dates from 1687.

Up the road from St Peter's is the 18th-century Baptist chapel. Although the Baptist church was founded before 1700, the present chapel was built in 1786 in typical Northamptonshire non-conformist style, being slightly wider than it is long. Built of the local brown limestone, with a gate guarded by two yew trees, it clashes a little with the attached brick-built Sunday School of 1899. The former graveyard has been converted into a garden area.

The remains of Walgrave Hall(?) are in the north part of the village. The manor dates from around the 13th century. The hall had a tower on the left and then a lower wing.

The remains of the hall(?) are now sub-divided but the plaster coat of arms of the Langham family remain with the date 1674. There is a fine staircase of c.1630.

== Annual events ==
Groove on the Green is an annually attended fundraiser event for the village fund and the small businesses that take part, often showcasing upcoming musical and comedy talent. The village also hosts open gardens where villagers get the opportunity to showcase their hard work.

== Village school ==
Walgrave Primary School is in Kettering Road, Walgrave. Details of a series of reports on the school can be found in the relevant section of the Ofsted website. At the time of the inspection in March 2011 the number of pupils enrolled stood at 125.

== Football ==
Walgrave is home to one of Northamptonshire's oldest football teams. Formed in 1896, the club played in the Northamptonshire League (subsequently to become the United Counties League), the Kettering & District Combination League, and more recently the Northants Central Combination League. In the last years of the 20th century, the club was forced to fold, and played for a while under the name Walgrave Royal Oak. After a gap of some 12 years, Walgrave Amber FC was reformed by David Rhodes. It formally re-affiliated with the Northants FA in 2007 and re-joined the Northants Combination League in time for the start of the 2008/9 season. The club's original nickname, The Pipe Stems, has only recently been unearthed. Several Amber players have gone on to play professional football at the highest level, most notably Harry Walden who starred in Northampton Town's rise from Division 4 obscurity to Division 1 between 1963 and 1966.

Walgrave Amber now plays its home games at the nearby new village of Mawsley, the facilities at the Walgrave Playing Field being no longer up to standard and the playing surface suffering a drainage collapse. Discussions regarding an upgrade of the changing rooms and renovation of the pitch are ongoing.
