= Harry Walden =

English footballer (1940–2018)

Personal information
- Full name: Harold Bertram Walden
- Date of birth: 22 December 1940
- Place of birth: Walgrave, England
- Date of death: 23 September 2018 (aged 77)
- Position: Midfielder

Senior career*
Years	Team	Apps	(Gls)
- Kettering Town
1961–1964	Luton Town	96	(11)
1964–1967	Northampton Town	76	(3)
- Kettering Town
- * Club domestic league appearances and goals

Harold Bertram Walden (22 December 1940 – 23 September 2018) was an English professional footballer.

== Career ==
Walden started out with Kettering Town, before signing for Luton Town in 1961. After playing 106 times for Luton in all competitions, he moved on to Northampton Town in 1964, where he made 76 league appearances in three years. In 1967, Walden returned to Kettering. He also played and scored many goals for team gb
