= Bryan Harvey (footballer) =

English footballer

Personal information
- Full name: Bryan Robert Harvey
- Date of birth: 26 August 1938
- Place of birth: Stepney, England
- Date of death: 31 March 2006 (aged 67)
- Place of death: Northampton, England
- Position: Goalkeeper

Youth career
- Wisbech Town

Senior career*
Years	Team	Apps	(Gls)
1958–1961	Newcastle United	86	(0)
1961-1962	Cambridge City	28	
1962–1963	Blackpool	11	(0)
1963–1968	Northampton Town	165	(0)
1968–?	Kettering Town		
Total		262	(0)
- * Club domestic league appearances and goals

Bryan Robert Harvey (26 August 1938 — 31 March 2006) was a professional footballer who played as a goalkeeper for Newcastle United, Blackpool, and Northampton Town. He also had a spell with Southern League Cambridge City from August 1961 to February 1962.

Harvey moved to Northampton Town in October 1963 and went on to make 181 appearances for "the Cobblers". In the 1964–65 season, his second season at the club, he was a mainstay in the team that finished runners-up in the Second Division, one point behind champions, former club Newcastle United. He also saved seven penalties during the season, including two in one match against Southampton, which were taken by Terry Paine, England's penalty taker at the time.
