= Norman Burtenshaw =

English football referee (1926–2023)

Norman Burtenshaw OBE
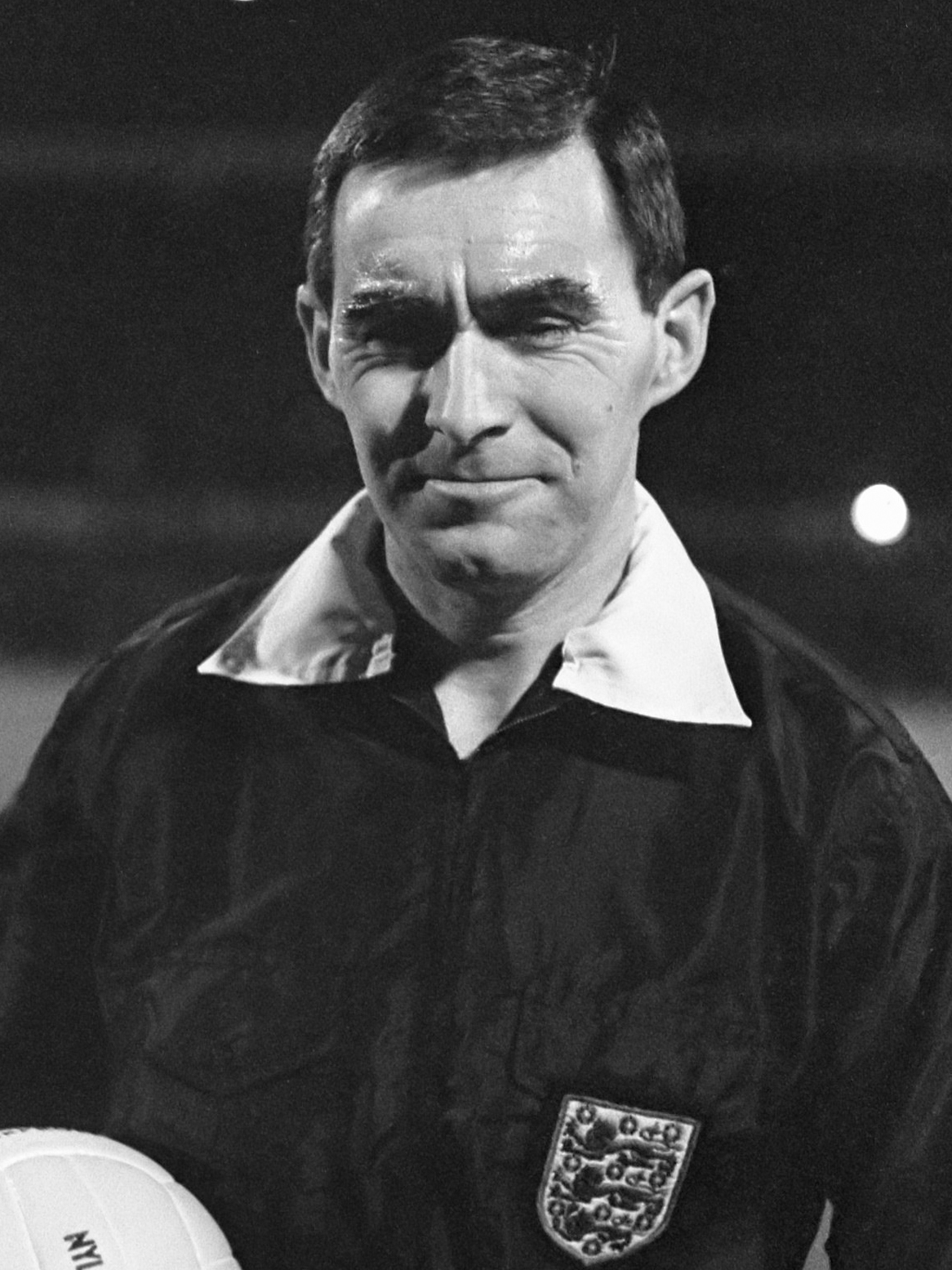
- Full name: Norman Charles Henry Burtenshaw
- Born: 9 February 1926; Great Yarmouth, Norfolk, England
- Died: 16 June 2023 (aged 97); Saxmundham, Suffolk, England
- Other occupation: Newsagent

Domestic
| Years | League | Role |
| 1962–1973 | Football League | Referee |

International
| Years | League | Role |
| 1965–1970 | FIFA listed | Referee |
| 1971–1973 | FIFA listed | Referee |

Norman Charles Henry Burtenshaw OBE (9 February 1926 – 16 June 2023) was an English football referee, who officiated in the English Football League and was also on the FIFA list. During his time on the list he was based in Great Yarmouth, Norfolk. Outside of football he originally worked as a night telephonist before becoming a newsagent.

== Career ==
Burtenshaw became a Football League referee in 1962, and achieved international status after only three seasons in 1965.

In 1967, he was knocked unconscious by incensed Millwall fans following their team's 2–1 defeat by Aston Villa at The Den. The FA dropped him from its list of referees' names submitted to FIFA in 1970. However, he had a strong season in 1970–71. Burtenshaw was given control of the 1971 FA Cup Final between Arsenal and Liverpool. Arsenal won 2–1 after extra time. At the end of the game Burtenshaw sank to the ground in celebration "pumping his fists towards the heavens". He later explained that he had been relieved that the game hadn't gone to a replay. When Arsenal beat Benfica 6–2 a few months later, Burtenshaw's performance upset the Benfica players so much, they surrounded and threatened him at the end of the game.

Burtenshaw regained his international status at the start of the 1971/72 season. Burtenshaw took charge of the 1972 League Cup Final between Stoke City and Chelsea, and a European Cup semi-final second leg tie between Benfica and Ajax, which turned out to be the most senior European club appointment of his career.

Burtenshaw retired at the end of the 1972–73 season, one which coincidentally saw the début of another Football League, FA Cup and FIFA referee from the same home town of Great Yarmouth – Alf Grey.

Burtenshaw was appointed an Officer of the Order of the British Empire (OBE) in the 1974 New Year Honours.

Burtenshaw later became president of the Referees' Association.

Burtenshaw died on 16 June 2023, at the age of 97.

| Preceded by Eric Jennings | FA Cup Final Referee; 1971 | Succeeded by David Smith |
