= Don Martin (footballer) =

English footballer

Personal information
- Full name: Donald Martin
- Date of birth: 15 February 1944
- Place of birth: Corby, England
- Date of death: 15 November 2009 (aged 65)
- Position: Forward

Senior career*
Years	Team	Apps	(Gls)
1962–1968	Northampton Town	136	(52)
1968–1976	Blackburn Rovers	214	(57)
1976–1978	Northampton Town	92	(17)
1978	Hitchin Town		
Total		442	(126)

Managerial career
- Corby Town
- * Club domestic league appearances and goals

Don Martin (15 February 1944 – 15 November 2009) was an English professional footballer who played for Northampton Town and Blackburn Rovers.

== Career ==
Martin came through the ranks at Northampton Town, although he hardly got into the team during the first few years. However, during the middle part of the 60's, he became a prolific scorer and when the Cobblers were promoted to Division One, he was one of the two joint top scorers. Despite the Cobblers falling back down the divisions Martin continued to score goals and once the club fell into Division Three, Blackburn Rovers stepped in with a bid of £36,000. Martin spent eight years at Blackburn suffering relegation to the Third Division and winning promotion back to the second tier in that time. When Bill Dodgin Jr. took over at Northampton he brought Martin back to the club. He was a more complete player by now, playing in midfield and defence as well as attack. He left the club in 1978 to play for Hitchin Town and later managed Corby Town as well as setting up a painting and decorating business.
