= Derek Leck =

English footballer

Personal information
- Full name: Derek Alan Leck
- Date of birth: 8 February 1937
- Place of birth: Deal, England
- Date of death: 11 July 2011 (aged 74)
- Place of death: Brighton, England
- Height: 6 ft 0 in (1.83 m)
- Position: Forward

Youth career
- Leyton Youth Club

Senior career*
Years	Team	Apps	(Gls)
1955–1958	Millwall	7	(2)
1958–1965	Northampton Town	246	(45)
1965–1966	Brighton & Hove Albion	30	(0)
1966–1969	Hastings United		
- Crawley Town
Total		283	(47)
- * Club domestic league appearances and goals

Derek Alan Leck (8 February 1937 – 11 July 2011) was an English professional footballer who played as a right half or centre forward in the Football League for Millwall, Northampton Town and Brighton & Hove Albion.

== Life and career ==
Leck was born in 1937 in Deal, Kent. He joined Millwall from Leyton Youth Club and turned professional in 1955, but played little, and moved on to Fourth Division club Northampton Town in 1958. Converted from centre forward to wing half, he became a regular in the Northampton side that gained three promotions in the next six seasons to reach the First Division for the 1965–66 Football League season. After 268 appearances in all competitions, he left the club in November 1965 for Brighton & Hove Albion where his league career ended prematurely because of injury. He played on for non-league clubs Hastings United and Crawley Town, and worked as a baker in the Sussex area, where he remained until his death from cancer in Brighton in 2011 at the age of 74.
