= John Kurila =

Scottish footballer (1941–2018)

Personal information
- Full name: John Kurila
- Date of birth: 10 April 1941
- Place of birth: Glasgow, Scotland
- Date of death: 6 March 2018 (aged 76)
- Position: Wing half

Senior career*
| Years | Team | Apps | (Gls) |
| 1958–1961 | Celtic | 5 | (0) |
| 1962 | Hamilton Steelers | | |
| 1962–1963 | Northampton Town | 40 | (1) |
| 1963 | Hamilton Steelers | | |
| 1963 | Bristol City | 6 | (0) |
| 1963–1968 | Northampton Town | 108 | (3) |
| 1968–1970 | Southend United | 88 | (1) |
| 1970–1972 | Colchester United | 53 | (4) |
| 1972 | Lincoln City | 24 | (0) |
| Total | | 324 | (9) |
- * Club domestic league appearances and goals

John Kurila (10 April 1941 – 6 March 2018) was a Scottish footballer, who played as a wing half in The Football League.

== Career ==
John was born in Scotland of Lithuanian parentage. He was raised in the Gorbals area of Glasgow, Scotland. Kurila most notably played for Northampton Town, as well as playing for Celtic, Bristol City, Southend United, Colchester United and Lincoln City. He also spent two summers in Canada playing for Hamilton Steelers of the Eastern Canada Professional Soccer League.

Kurila settled in the Northampton area after football — he had two separate spells with the Cobblers — and worked in the building trade, notably as a qualified carpenter. He was married to Nan Carr, also from Glasgow, and had three children - a daughter Keely, and two sons, Mick and Alan, who both became footballers at non-League level. Kurila died in March 2018 at the age of 76.

== Honours ==
=== Club ===
Northampton Town

- Football League Second Division Runner-up (1): 1964–65
- Football League Third Division Winner (1): 1962–63
