= John Mackin =

Scottish footballer and manager (1943–2022)

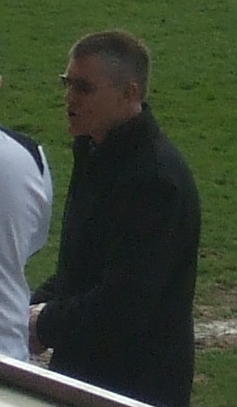
- Mackin attending a York City match in 2009

Personal information
- Full name: John Mackin
- Date of birth: 18 November 1943
- Place of birth: Bellshill, Scotland
- Date of death: 29 July 2022 (age 78)
- Height: 5 ft 9 in (1.75 m)
- Position: Defender

Senior career*
Years	Team	Apps	(Gls)
1965–1969	Northampton Town	101	(11)
1969	Lincoln City	3	(0)
1969–1973	York City	160	(7)
1973	→ Darlington (loan)	2	(0)
1973–1975	Corby Town		
Total		266	(18)

Managerial career
- 1975–1977: Corby Town
- * Club domestic league appearances and goals

John Mackin (18 November 1943 – 29 July 2022) was a Scottish professional footballer and manager.

== Career ==
Born in Bellshill, North Lanarkshire, Mackin played for Northampton Town, Lincoln City, York City and Darlington in the Football League. He was appointed player-manager of Corby Town in July 1973. Mackin died in July 2022 aged 78.
