= Barry Lines =

English footballer (1942–2023)

Personal information
- Date of birth: 16 May 1942
- Place of birth: Bletchley, England
- Date of death: 8 January 2023 (aged 80)
- Position: Outside left

Senior career*
Years	Team	Apps	(Gls)
–1960	Bletchley Town		
1960–1970	Northampton Town	266	(48)
1970–1971	Bletchley Town		
1971–19??	Buckingham Athletic		

Managerial career
- 1971–19??: Buckingham Athletic (player-manager)
- * Club domestic league appearances and goals

Barry Lines (16 May 1942 – 8 January 2023) was an English professional footballer who played 266 league matches for Northampton Town. He played either at outside left or inside left.

He signed professional terms with Northampton Town in October 1960, and made his debut for the club a month later. He scored 50 goals across 296 appearances for the club over a 10 year period, and was the first player to play across all four divisions of the Football League for one club.

He returned to Bletchley Town in July 1970 after leaving Northampton. He became player-manager at Buckingham Athletic a year later.

Following the end of his playing career, he settled in Bletchley where he worked as an accountant and managed a sports shop, before retiring in 2002. Lines died on 8 January 2023, at the age of 80.
