= Vic Cockcroft =

English footballer

Personal information
- Full name: Victor Herbert Cockcroft
- Date of birth: 25 February 1941 (age 85)
- Place of birth: Birmingham, England
- Position: Full back

Youth career
- –1959: Wolverhampton Wanderers

Senior career*
Years	Team	Apps	(Gls)
1959–1962	Wolverhampton Wanderers	0	(0)
1962–1967	Northampton Town	47	(1)
1967–1968	Rochdale	42	(0)
- Kidderminster Harriers

International career
- England Youth
- * Club domestic league appearances and goals

Victor Herbert Cockcroft (born 25 February 1941) is an English retired professional footballer who played in the Football League for Northampton Town and Rochdale as a full back. He was capped by England at youth level and was a part of the Northampton Town squad during the club's only season in the top-flight of English football.

== Career statistics ==
Appearances and goals by club, season and competition
Club	Season	League			FA Cup		League Cup		Total	
Club	Season	Division	Apps	Goals	Apps	Goals	Apps	Goals	Apps	Goals
Northampton Town	1965–66	First Division	18	1	0	0	0	0	18	1
Career total			18	1	0	0	0	0	18	1
