= Terry Branston =

English footballer

Personal information
- Full name: Terence George Branston
- Date of birth: 25 July 1938
- Place of birth: Rugby, England
- Date of death: 22 December 2010 (aged 72)
- Place of death: Coventry, England
- Position: Defender

Youth career
- 1958–1960: Northampton Town

Senior career*
| Years | Team | Apps | (Gls) |
| 1960–1967 | Northampton Town | 246 | (2) |
| 1967–1970 | Luton Town | 101 | (9) |
| 1970–1973 | Lincoln City | 100 | (1) |
- Nuneaton Borough
| Total | | 447 | (12) |
- * Club domestic league appearances and goals

Terence George Branston (25 July 1938 – 22 December 2010) was an English footballer, most noted as a player for Northampton Town and Luton Town.

== Playing career ==
Joining Northampton Town in October 1958, Branston did not make his debut until 1960. The tough-tackling centre-back helped Northampton sweep from Division Four to Division One in successive seasons. When Northampton started to fall back as quickly as they had emerged, Branston left to join Allan Brown's Luton Town in 1967.

Branston was made club captain on arrival, and skippered Luton to the Fourth Division title during his first season with the club. He led them to a further promotion two years later, before moving on to Lincoln City. After three years with Lincoln, he moved into semi-retirement; combining his driving school in Rugby with non-League football at Nuneaton Borough.

Branston died of brain cancer on 22 December 2010.
