= Tommy Robson =

English footballer (1944–2020)

Personal information
- Full name: Thomas Henry Robson
- Date of birth: 31 July 1944
- Place of birth: Gateshead, England
- Date of death: 8 October 2020 (aged 76)
- Place of death: Peterborough, England
- Position: Left winger

Youth career
- 195?–1959: Newcastle United
- 1959–1961: Northampton Town

Senior career*
Years	Team	Apps	(Gls)
1961–1966	Northampton Town	74	(20)
1966	Chelsea	7	(0)
1966–1969	Newcastle United	48	(11)
1969–1981	Peterborough United	482	(111)
1981–198?	Nuneaton Borough		
- Stamford
Total		611+	(142+)
- * Club domestic league appearances and goals

Thomas Henry Robson (31 July 1944 – 8 October 2020) was an English footballer who made more than 600 appearances in the Football League playing as a left winger.

== Life and career ==
Robson was born in Gateshead. He played for Newcastle United as a junior, but was released and joined Northampton Town as a 15-year-old. He represented England at youth level, and went on to play for Chelsea before returning to Newcastle United. In 1968, he joined Peterborough United. Robson served the club for 13 years, becoming their all-time record appearance-maker with 482 league matches played, before leaving League football for Nuneaton Borough and Stamford. On 4 October 2008, Robson became the first ever inductee to the Peterborough United Hall of Fame.

In September 2019, Robson revealed that he had been diagnosed with motor neurone disease. He died in Peterborough City Hospital on 8 October 2020, aged 76 following his battle with MND.
