= Bletchley Town F.C. =

Bletchley Town
- Full name: Bletchley Town Football Club
- Nicknames: The Gladiators, The Moles
- Founded: 1914; 2005 (refounded)
- Dissolved: 1974 (became Milton Keynes City F.C.); 2013
- Ground: Manor Fields, Fenny Stratford
- Chairman: John Snead
- 2011–12: Spartan South Midlands League; Division Two, 8th
Home colours

Bletchley Town F.C. was a football club based in Fenny Stratford near Bletchley, a constituent town of Milton Keynes in Buckinghamshire, England. The business was dissolved on 29 January 2013. For the 2012–13 season, the first team was a member of the Spartan South Midlands League Division Two.

== History ==
The first Association Football club to represent Bletchley was formed in 1914 as Bletchley Sports, and after the First World War the club became Bletchley Sports Club. The club joined the Bedfordshire and District County League in the 1927–28 season, which became the South Midlands League two seasons later. At the start of the 1930–31 season the club again changed its name, this time to Bletchley Town Sports. The club stayed in the South Midlands League until the end of the 1933–1934 season, when they finished bottom of division one and left the league.

After the Second World War, "Bletchley L M S" took over the Bletchley colours, operating from 1947 to 1960 but gaining competition from 1952 from "Bletchley B B O B" (later called "Bletchley United") which played until 1976.

Meanwhile, Bletchley Town resumed competing in the South Midlands League in 1948 before transferring to the Spartan League Division One for the 1952/3 season. They gained promotion to the Premier Division as champions in only their first season. From 1954/5 (the last season of their first period in the Spartan League) they played under the name of "Bletchley & Wipac Sports Club" and two seasons later, for the 1956–57 campaign, changed their name to "Bletchley & WIPAC" by which time they had joined the Hellenic League. The club became Bletchley Town F.C. again a season later, and stayed in the Hellenic league until the end of the 1958–59 season after which they played for a season back in the Spartan League before becoming members of the United Counties League. They moved leagues again when they joined the Metropolitan League in the 1968–69 season, but three years later they switched leagues again by joining the Southern Football League, spending the next few seasons switching between Division one North and south.

Once again the club changed its name, this time to Milton Keynes City (Note: Note that the name Milton Keynes City F.C. was revived again fourteen seasons later for the 1998–99 season, when an existing team called Mercedes-Benz Football Club, named after the factory where many of the players worked, changed their name. The club was playing in the Spartan South Midlands Football League and moved to Wolverton Park, which had been the home of Wolverton A.F.C. until they had collapsed six years earlier. As with Bletchley, City's directors believed that they could build their club up to be accepted as representing Milton Keynes as a whole, however they never achieved this. Following the departure of the directors in June 2003, the team folded in July, unable to secure the investment needed to continue. For details, see Milton Keynes City.) at the beginning of the 1974–75 season. The club continued in the southern league until the 1984–85 season, when the club folded, with their only notable achievement being to have won the Berks and Bucks cup in the 1979–80 season.

=== 2005 to 2014 ===
However once again the club was reborn and as per usual with a change of name, 'Bletchley Town F.C.', for the 2005–06 season. The club started life in the North Bucks & District Football League and two seasons later were in the Spartan South Midland league.

By March 2014, the club had disbanded.

On 21 October 2014, its name was (re?)registered as a private limited company.

=== Previous clubs representing Bletchley ===
With the many club name changes there have been several teams that also have represented Bletchley over the years that may be confused with Bletchley Town.

1. Bletchley L M S (1947 to 1960)
2. Bletchley B B O B (1952 to 1957 then changed name to Bletchley United)
3. Bletchley United (1957 to 1976)

== Ground ==
Bletchley Town played their games at Manor Field, Bletchley, Buckinghamshire MK2 2HX. In 2010 the club put in a proposal to the council to construct a 2600 capacity playing arena.

== Club honours ==
- United Counties League :
  - Runners-up: 1967–68
- South Midlands League Premier Division:
  - Winners: 1955–56
- Berks and Bucks Senior Cup:
  - Winners: 1979–80

=== Current club honours ===
- North Bucks & District League Division one :
  - Runners-up: 2007–08
- North Bucks & District Division two trophy :
  - Runners-up: 2005–06

== Club records ==
For all Bletchley Town teams.

- Highest League Position: 9th in Southern League Division One South 1972–73
- F.A Cup best Performance: Fourth qualifying round 1964–65, 1965–66
- F.A Trophy best Performance: Second qualifying round 1977–78, 1978–79
- F.A. Vase best performance: Fourth round 2001–02

== Former players ==
For all Bletchley Town teams.

1. Players that have played/managed in the football league or any foreign equivalent to this level (i.e. fully professional league).
2. Players with full international caps.

- (England) Brian Gibbs
- (England) Bob Morton
