= Graham Carr =

English footballer, manager, and scout (born 1944)

Personal information
- Full name: William Graham Carr
- Date of birth: 25 October 1944 (age 82)
- Place of birth: Corbridge, England
- Position: Half back

Senior career*
Years	Team	Apps	(Gls)
1962–1968	Northampton Town	85	(0)
1968–1969	York City	33	(1)
1969–1970	Bradford Park Avenue	42	(2)
- Altrincham
- Telford United
- Poole Town
- Dartford
- Tonbridge
- Weymouth
Total		160	(3)

Managerial career
- Dartford
- 1977–1978: Weymouth
- 1978–????: Dartford
- 1981–1985: Nuneaton Borough
- 1985–1990: Northampton Town
- 1990: Blackpool
- 1991: Maidstone United
- 1992–1995: Kettering Town
- 1995: Weymouth
- 1995–1996: Dagenham & Redbridge
- * Club domestic league appearances and goals

William Graham Carr (born 25 October 1944) is an English former professional footballer, manager and scout. He is an associate director of Northampton Town.

== Club career ==
Carr, a half-back, joined his first professional club, Northampton Town in August 1962 and captained their reserve side before breaking into their first team. He played 27 times in Northampton's only season in the First Division. He moved to York City in June 1968 and then to Bradford Park Avenue in July 1969 where he was a regular in their final season in the Football League.

After leaving Bradford he moved into non-league football with Altrincham and Telford United, with whom he won an FA Trophy winners medal in 1971. He later played for Poole Town and Dartford, with whom he won the Southern League and gained an FA Trophy runners-up medal in 1974.

== Coaching career ==
Carr's first job in management was as player-manager at Dartford. He briefly left management to play for Tonbridge and Weymouth before being appointed player-manager of Weymouth in January 1977.

Carr resigned in 1978 to manage Dartford and later managed Nuneaton Borough until 1985 when he left to become manager of his first club Northampton Town. He led the Cobblers to the Fourth Division title in the 1986–87 season. However, the title winning side's leading scorer Richard Hill was sold to Watford and his strike partner Trevor Morley to Manchester City and Carr's subsequent sides struggled for goals and went from being a free-scoring attacking side to a negative one relying on the offside trap.

Carr was sacked from Northampton in May 1990 after their relegation back to the Fourth Division, taking over at Blackpool, who had been relegated along with Northampton, the following month. He had a torrid time at Blackpool, where he was never popular with the home fans, who took to spitting on the dugout during home games, especially after letting the previous season's player of the year, Colin Methven, sign for Walsall, saying he was neither good enough nor quick enough for Fourth Division football. He was sacked on 30 November after Blackpool were beaten 4–0 away to Tranmere Rovers in the Football League Trophy days earlier. He was, until Michael Appleton in 2012, Blackpool's shortest-serving manager, with just sixteen Football League matches in charge.

In February 1991 Carr was appointed as manager of Maidstone United, who had just sacked Keith Peacock following a run of poor results. Carr's time at Maidstone was also unhappy; a series of poor signings and baffling tactical decisions saw the team slump towards the foot of the table, and the Maidstone fans chanting for the board to sack him, which they did in October 1991, less than a year before the Kent side were forced to resign from the Football League.

Carr took over as manager of Kettering Town in September 1992, with the club in administration and under the threat of a winding-up order. Despite these off the field problems, Carr led the club to mid-table safety in the Football Conference. Kettering came out of administration in the summer of 1993 and Carr built on the relative success of the previous season, taking the side to within three points of the Conference title. He left Kettering at the end of the 1994–95 season after losing the fans' support, despite Kettering finishing sixth in the Conference.

Carr was not out of work for long, returning to Weymouth as manager on 12 May 1995, but resigned in September the same year.

Carr joined Dagenham and Redbridge in the autumn of 1995 following the sacking of Dave Cusack but he was sacked three games before the end of the season, having led the side to relegation.

Carr was briefly appointed assistant manager at Doncaster Rovers.

== Scouting career ==
In more recent times, he has built a good reputation as a scout for Tottenham Hotspur working under David Pleat, and since Manchester City and Notts County both places working under Sven-Göran Eriksson. In February 2010 he left his second stint at Spurs to join Newcastle United as their chief scout following the reign of Dennis Wise. Newcastle were promoted back to the Premier League in April 2010 and Carr was central to helping managers Chris Hughton and Alan Pardew (who replaced the sacked Hughton in December 2010) sign players from the French, Dutch and German leagues such as Hatem Ben Arfa, Yohan Cabaye, Sylvain Marveaux, Papiss Cissé and Cheick Tioté, which helped turn the club's fortunes around. As a result, they finished fifth in the Premier League in the 2011–12 season, which led to qualification for the 2012–13 Europa League. In June 2012, Carr was rewarded for this work with a new eight-year contract with his hometown club, a deal which would have kept him at the club until he was aged 75 years. However, in June 2017 his contract was terminated by mutual consent.

== Associate director ==
In August 2017, Carr returned to his former club Northampton Town to take up a role as an associate director.

== Family ==
Carr is the father of comedian Alan Carr. Their relationship and his son's upbringing in Northampton were serialised in the semi-autobiographical comedy television series Changing Ends on ITV.

== Honours ==
Northampton Town

- Football League Fourth Division: 1986–87

== See also ==
- 1990–91 Blackpool F.C. season
