= Theo Foley =

Irish association footballer and manager (1937–2020)

Personal information
- Full name: Theo Foley
- Date of birth: 2 April 1937
- Place of birth: Inchicore, Ireland
- Date of death: 26 June 2020 (aged 83)
- Position: Right back

Senior career*
| Years | Team | Apps | (Gls) |
| –1955 | Home Farm | | |
| 1955–1961 | Exeter City | 155 | (1) |
| 1961–1967 | Northampton Town | 204 | (8) |
| 1967–1968 | Charlton Athletic | 6 | (0) |
| Total | | 365 | (9) |

International career
| 1964–1967 | Republic of Ireland | 9 | (0) |

Managerial career
- 1970–1974: Charlton Athletic
- 1990–1992: Northampton Town
- * Club domestic league appearances and goals

Theo Foley (2 April 1937 – 26 June 2020) was an Irish association footballer and football manager/coach.

He was born in Inchicore, Dublin, Ireland.

== Playing career ==
During his footballing career, he played as a defender for Home Farm, Exeter City, Northampton Town and Charlton Athletic.

He also appeared nine times for the Republic of Ireland.

== Coaching career ==
In the mid 1970s Foley was assistant manager, then manager, at Charlton Athletic.

This was followed by a spell as assistant manager at Millwall, reserve team coach at Queen's Park Rangers and another spell as assistant manager at Millwall from December 1982 to George Graham.

On 14 May 1986 Foley became assistant manager of Arsenal when Graham was appointed manager. Graham and Foley's focus was on organised defence and strong running resulting in the club winning a League Cup and Football League Title together.

In May 1990 when Graham changed his managerial staff, he appointed Stewart Houston as his number two. Rather than take the reserve team managers job, Foley left Arsenal to manage Northampton Town where he remained for two years.

In April 1993 he became youth team coach at Fulham. He was assistant manager at Southend United from June 1994 until he was dismissed on 10 February 1997. In the summer of 1997, he joined Leeds United to become a scout under George Graham. In July 1998 he became Reserve Team Coach at Tottenham Hotspur, linking up with Graham again three months later when the latter became Spurs manager. Foley remained at the club even after the sackings of both Graham and Stewart Houston in March 2001. However he was made redundant along with several other coaching staff members in July 2003 by Enic in a cost cutting exercise. He did some scouting for Wolves for a time. After this he went into retirement though he was a matchday host for Charlton and in retirement watched Millwall and Arsenal.

== Author ==
In October 2018, Foley published his autobiography "Theo Give Us A Ball" which he wrote with his son Paul.

== Death ==
Theo Foley died on 26 June 2020, aged 83.
