= 1968 Vancouver Royals season =

Vancouver Royals
1968 season
- Owner: George Fleharty
- Head coach: Ferenc Puskás
- Stadium: Empire Stadium
- North American Soccer League: 4th, Pacific Division; 12th Overall
- Top goalscorer: League: All: Henry Klein
- Highest home attendance: 10,866 (Aug. 10 vs. Los Angeles)
- Lowest home attendance: 3,123 (Apr. 10 vs. Baltimore)
- Average home league attendance: 6,197
Home colours	Away colours

The 1968 Vancouver Royal Canadians season was the second season in the history of the Vancouver Royal Canadians soccer club. The club played in the North American Soccer League (NASL) at Empire Stadium in Vancouver, British Columbia.

Following the 1967 season, the USA and the FIFA-blacklisted National Professional Soccer League merged to form the North American Soccer League. The merger meant that teams from the predecessor leagues competing against each other in the same markets needed to be moved, combined, or folded. As part of this process, George Fleharty bought the Vancouver Royal Canadians from E.G. Eakins and folded his NPSL team, the San Francisco Golden Gate Gales. The new owner shortened the name to Vancouver Royals and chose player-coach Ferenc Puskás over future England coach Bobby Robson, the previous owner's new manager for the Vancouver Royals; he resigned when offered the demotion to assistant coach. The 1968 Vancouver Royals' roster was put together without the preparation or advantage of importing an entire team. A significant amount of the team was recruited by Bobby Robson including two brothers from Hong Kong playing in England. Ferenc Puskás also brought in several Europeans, a few players with connections to the Golden Gate Gaels, as well as at least two local players from local leagues. A few foreign players settled in Vancouver after their playing careers including Peter Dinsdale. The Vancouver Royals had the third highest average attendance in the league at 6,197. The club folded after the 1968 season as the NASL contracted from seventeen clubs to five for the 1969 NASL season. The five remaining teams were located roughly in the U.S. Midwest with one team on the east coast.

== Coaches ==
- (England) Bobby Robson
- (Hungary) (Spain) Ferenc Puskás

== Players ==
Num	Name	Pos	Height	Weight	Apps	G	A
1	Chris Varnavas (Cyprus)	G	183	77	26	0	0
2	Bobby Cram (England)	D	180	78	32	2	0
3	Gerrit Lagendijk (Netherlands)	D	173	73	5	1	0
4	Antonio Collar (Spain)	M	180	76	20	0	0
5	Tomas Krivitz (Hungary)	D	175	77	25	0	0
6	Peter Dinsdale (England)	D	180	80	30	0	0
7	Lajos Vicek (Socialist Federal Republic of Yugoslavia)	F	170	67	15	2	0
8	Janos Hanek (Hungary)	F	173	74	12	3	0
9	John Green (England)	F	175	68	25	4	0
10	Cheung Chi Doy (British Hong Kong)	F	173	71	11	2	0
11	Kirk Apostolidis (Greece)	F	178	77	7	0	0
11	Leif Claesson (Sweden)	F	183	79	16	3	0
12	Cheung Chi Wai (British Hong Kong)	F	170	69	32	2	0
13	Mirko Casic (Socialist Federal Republic of Yugoslavia)				2	0	0
13	Atilla Sandor (Germany)	F	170	63	1	0	0
14	Brian "Pat" O'Connell (England)	F	173	72	27	6	0
15	Henry Hill (England)	D	175	75	3	0	0
16	Gyorgy Liptak (Hungary)	D	178	83	12	0	0
17	Jose Arranz (Spain)	F	175	76	4	0	0
17	Ike MacKay (Canada)	F	183	79	15	2	0
18	Joaquin Rey (Spain)	M	178	72	22	4	0
19	Jean-Pierre Chaillat (Hungary)	F	165	70	2	0	0
20	Gary DeLong (United States)	G	178	71	9	0	0
21	Henry Klein (Luxembourg)	F	180	79	26	20	4
	Ken Pears (Canada)	G			0	0	0
	Reg Stratton (England)	F			4	0	0

Num = Number, Pos = Position, Height in cm, Weight in kg, Apps = Appearances, G = Goals, A = Assists

== Results ==
=== Standings ===
Pacific Division	W	L	T	GF	GA	Pts
San Diego Toros	18	8	6	65	38	186
Oakland Clippers	18	8	6	71	38	185
Los Angeles Wolves	11	13	8	55	52	139
Vancouver Royals	12	15	5	51	60	136

=== Results by round ===
Round	1	2	3	4	5	6	7	8	9	10	11	12	13	14	15	16	17	18	19	20	21	22	23	24	25	26	27	28	29	30	31	32
Ground	H	H	H	A	A	H	H	A	H	H	A	A	A	H	H	H	H	H	A	H	A	A	A	H	H	A	H	H	A	A	A	A
Result	W	W	W	L	L	W	D	L	L	D	W	L	D	L	D	L	W	W	L	W	L	W	L	L	W	L	W	L	L	W	L	D

Source: soccerstats.us
A = Away; H = Home; W = Win; D = Draw; L = Loss

=== Match results ===
April 7, 1968 1	Vancouver Royals	4–1	Toronto Falcons	Vancouver, British Columbia
	Lajos Vicek; Janos Hanek; John Green (footballer)	Report	López	Stadium: Empire Stadium; Attendance: 5,620

April 10, 1968 2	Vancouver Royals	2–1	Baltimore Bays	Vancouver, British Columbia
	Henry Klein; Cheung Chi Doy	Report	Uriel	Stadium: Empire Stadium; Attendance: 3,123

April 14, 1968 3	Vancouver Royals	3–1	New York Generals	Vancouver, British Columbia
	Henry Klein; Jonas Hanek	Report	Perau	Stadium: Empire Stadium; Attendance: 6,342

April 16, 1968 4	St. Louis Stars	2–1	Vancouver Royals	St. Louis, Missouri
	Pogrzeba; Frankiewicz	Report	Bobby Cram	Stadium: Busch Memorial Stadium; Attendance: 3,188

April 20, 1968 5	Detroit Cougars	2–1	Vancouver Royals	Detroit, Michigan
	Kerr	Report	Henry Klein	Stadium: Tiger Stadium; Attendance: 2,700

April 28, 1968 6	Vancouver Royals	1–0	Atlanta Chiefs	Vancouver, British Columbia
	Joaquin Rey	Report		Stadium: Empire Stadium; Attendance: 6,780

May 5, 1968 7	Vancouver Royals	1–1	Chicago Mustangs	Vancouver, British Columbia
	Johnny Green	Report	Stojovic	Stadium: Empire Stadium; Attendance: 5,780

May 8, 1968 8	San Diego Toros	5–1	Vancouver Royals	San Diego, California
	Fernández; Baeza; Vavá	Report	Brian O'Connell	Stadium: Balboa Stadium; Attendance: 6,614

May 12, 1968 9	Vancouver Royals	0–1	Oakland Clippers	Vancouver, British Columbia
		Report	Mitic	Stadium: Empire Stadium; Attendance: 5,672

May 19, 1968 10	Vancouver Royals	2–2	Kansas City Spurs	Vancouver, British Columbia
	Brian O'Connell	Report	Barber	Stadium: Empire Stadium; Attendance: 4,831

May 22, 1968 11	Los Angeles Wolves	0–1	Vancouver Royals	Los Angeles, California
		Report	Henry Klein	Stadium: Rose Bowl; Attendance: 3,834

June 2, 1968 12	Kansas City Spurs	2–1	Vancouver Royals	Kansas City, Missouri
	Glock; Roy	Report	Cheung Chi Doy	Stadium: Kansas City Municipal Stadium; Attendance: 6,453

June 5, 1968 13	St. Louis Stars	0–0	Vancouver Royals	St. Louis, Missouri
		Report		Stadium: Busch Memorial Stadium, Attendance: 5,902

June 8, 1968 14	Vancouver Royals	1–3	San Diego Toros	Vancouver, British Columbia
	Lajos Vicek	Report	Fernández	Stadium: Empire Stadium; Attendance: 5,118

June 15, 1968 15	Vancouver Royals	2–2	Oakland Clippers	Vancouver, British Columbia
	Cheung Chi Wai; Leif Claesson	Report	Davidovic; Marin	Stadium: Empire Stadium; Attendance: 6,027

June 22, 1968 16	Vancouver Royals	1–3	St. Louis Stars	Vancouver, British Columbia
	Brian O'Connell	Report	Pogrzeba; Wrenger; Frankiewicz	Stadium: Empire Stadium; Attendance: 7,352

June 26, 1968 17	Vancouver Royals	2–0	Kansas City Spurs	Vancouver, British Columbia
	Ike Mackay; Henry Klein	Report		Stadium: Empire Stadium; Attendance: 4,100

June 29, 1968 18	Vancouver Royals	1–0	Los Angeles Wolves	Vancouver, British Columbia
	Henry Klein	Report		Stadium: Empire Stadium; Attendance: 5,583

July 4, 1968 19	Oakland Clippers	4–0	Vancouver Royals	Oakland, California
	Hoftvedt; Mitic; Davidovic; Milosevic	Report		Stadium: Oakland–Alameda County Coliseum; Attendance: 3,353

July 9, 1968 20	Vancouver Royals	3–1	Dallas Tornado	Vancouver, British Columbia
	Henry Klein; Ike Mackay	Report	Renshaw	Stadium: Empire Stadium; Attendance: 5,832

July 12, 1968 21	Boston Beacons	3–2	Vancouver Royals	Boston, Massachusetts
	Mulligan; Dyreborg; Sosa	Report	Henry Klein	Stadium: Fenway Park; Attendance: 2,800

July 17, 1968 22	Cleveland Stokers	1–2	Vancouver Royals	Cleveland, Ohio
	Mateos	Report	Joaquin Rey; Brian O'Connell	Stadium: Cleveland Stadium; Attendance: 3,541

July 19, 1968 23	Toronto Falcons	4–3	Vancouver Royals	Toronto, Ontario
	Daucik; López; DeBrito	Report	Henry Klein; Leif Claesson	Stadium: Varsity Stadium; Attendance: 5,171

July 27, 1968 24	Vancouver Royals	1–2	San Diego Toros	Vancouver, British Columbia
	Henry Klein	Report	Tomic; Meszaros	Stadium: Empire Stadium; Attendance: 8,824

August 3, 1968 25	Vancouver Royals	2–1	Houston Stars	Vancouver, British Columbia
	Johnny Green; Joaquin Rey	Report	Szalay	Stadium: Empire Stadium; Attendance: 7,307

August 7, 1968 26	Oakland Clippers	6–1	Vancouver Royals	Oakland, California
	Saccone; Mitic; Milosevic	Report	Henry Klein	Stadium: Oakland–Alameda County Coliseum; Attendance: 3,212

August 10, 1968 27	Vancouver Royals	4–1	Los Angeles Wolves	Vancouver, British Columbia
	Johnny Green; Joaquin Rey; Henry Klein	Report	Walker	Stadium: Empire Stadium; Attendance: 10,866

August 15, 1968 28	Vancouver Royals	3–5	Washington Whips	Vancouver, British Columbia
	Henry Klein; Brian O'Connell; Leif Claesson	Report	Heineman; D'Oliveira; Siega; Hansen	Stadium: Empire Stadium; Attendance: 4,572

August 19, 1968 29	San Diego Toros	2–0	Vancouver Royals	San Diego, California
	Fernández	Report		Stadium: Balboa Stadium; Attendance: 6,322

August 30, 1968 30	Dallas Tornado	0–3	Vancouver Royals	Dallas, Texas
		Report	Bobby Cram; Cheung Chi Wai; Gerrit Lagendijk	Stadium: Cotton Bowl; Attendance: 1,711

September 1, 1968 31	Los Angeles Wolves	2–0	Vancouver Royals	Los Angeles, California
	Ford; Houliston	Report		Stadium: Rose Bowl; Attendance: 1,300

September 7, 1968 32	Houston Stars	2–2	Vancouver Royals	Houston, Texas
	Juracy; Merayo	Report	Henry Klein	Stadium: Astrodome; Attendance: 2,776

== See also ==
- Vancouver Royals
- Vancouver Whitecaps
