= 1967 Vancouver Royal Canadians season =

Vancouver Royal Canadians
1967 season
- Owner: Brigadier General E.G. Eakins
- Head coach: Ian McColl
- Stadium: Empire Stadium
- United Soccer Association: 5th, Western Division
- Average home league attendance: 7,019
Home colours	Away colours

The 1967 Vancouver Royal Canadians season was the first season in the history of the Vancouver Royal Canadians soccer club. The club played in the United Soccer Association (USA), a league that used clubs from Europe and South America to represent American and Canadian cities. First division Football League side Sunderland A.F.C, who finished 17th in the 1966–67 Football League, was the club that represented Vancouver in the USA. The club played its home games at Empire Stadium in Vancouver, British Columbia.

Following the 1967 season, the USA and the National Professional Soccer League merged to form the North American Soccer League. The San Francisco Golden Gate Gales of the USA merged with Vancouver, and the club was renamed the Vancouver Royals for the inaugural season of the NASL.

== Players ==
The Vancouver Royals' roster was made up of Sunderland A.F.C. players on their summer break.

Num	Name	Pos	Height	Weight	Apps	G	A
1	Jim Montgomery (England)	G			6	0	0
2	Cecil Irwin (England)	D			12	0	2
3	John Parke (Northern Ireland)	D			7		
4	Colin Todd (England)	M	175	69	12	1	0
5	George Kinnell (Scotland)	M	183	76	12	2	0
6	Jim Baxter (Scotland)	M	180	76	12	2	3
7	Allan Gauden (England)	F	173	70	8	2	2
8	John O'Hare (Scotland)	F	173	81	11	1	1
9	Neil Martin (Scotland)	F			11	1	1
10	George Herd (Scotland)	F	173	70	6	3	2
11	George Mulhall (Scotland)	F	175	70	10	3	0
12	Jim Shoulder (England)	D	173	71	5	1	0
13	Derek Forster (England)	G	175		7	0	0
14	Colin Suggett (England)	F	175	68	12	3	0
15	Brian Heslop	M	178	73	8	0	1
16	William Hughes (Scotland)	M	173	66	8	0	1

Num = Number, Pos = Position, Height in cm, Weight in kg, Apps = Appearances, G = Goals, A = Assists

== Results ==
=== Standings ===
Pos	Team	Pld	W	D	L	GF	GA	GD	Pts	Qualification
1	Los Angeles Wolves (C)	12	5	5	2	21	14	+7	15	1967 USA Championship
2	San Francisco Golden Gate Gales	12	5	3	4	25	19	+6	13	
3	Chicago Mustangs	12	3	7	2	20	14	+6	13	
4	Houston Stars	12	4	4	4	19	18	+1	12	
5	Vancouver Royal Canadians	12	3	5	4	20	28	−8	11	
6	Dallas Tornado	12	3	3	6	14	23	−9	9	

Source: American Soccer History Archives
Rules for classification: 1) points; 2) goal difference; 3) number of goals scored.
Note: 2 points for a win, 1 point for a tie, 0 points for a loss
(C) Champions

=== Match results ===
Win Draw Loss

May 28 1	San Francisco	6–1	Vancouver	San Francisco, California
	Houwaart; Maassen; Heynen		Suggett	Stadium: Kezar Stadium; Attendance: 8,177

June 4 2	Detroit	1–1	Vancouver	Detroit, Michigan
	Trainor		Herd	Stadium: University of Detroit Stadium; Attendance: 11,629

June 7 3	Vancouver	4–1	Dallas	Vancouver, British Columbia
	Martin; Suggett 47'; Mulhall		Hainey 38'	Stadium: Empire Stadium; Attendance: 10,053

June 11 4	Vancouver	1–0	Boston	Vancouver, British Columbia
	O'Hare 21'			Stadium: Empire Stadium; Attendance: 7,616

June 14 5	Los Angeles	5–1	Vancouver	Los Angeles, California
	Hunt; Buckley; Dougan; Knowles		Heslop	Stadium: Los Angeles Memorial Coliseum; Attendance: 5,251

June 18 6	Vancouver	1–4	Houston	Vancouver, British Columbia
			Borge	Stadium: Empire Stadium; Attendance: 6,785

June 21 7	Vancouver	2–4	Toronto	Vancouver, British Columbia
	Martin 27'; Herd		Heslop 31' (o.g.); Stein 55'; Scott; Stevenson	Stadium: Empire Stadium; Attendance: 5,114

June 25 8	Toronto	2–2	Vancouver	Toronto, Ontario
	Stein; Davis 78'		Gauden 33'; Mulhall	Stadium: Varsity Stadium; Attendance: 4,385; Referee: Harry Sadler

June 28 9	Washington	1–1	Vancouver	Washington, D.C.
	Munro 14'		Gauden 48'	Stadium: D.C. Stadium; Attendance: 8,709

July 1 10	Chicago	2–2	Vancouver	Chicago, Illinois
				Stadium: White Sox Park; Attendance: 3,602

July 5 11	Vancouver	1–1	New York	Vancouver, British Columbia
	Kinnell 83'		Ribeiro 10'	Stadium: Empire Stadium; Attendance: 6,533

July 9 12	Vancouver	3–1	Cleveland	Vancouver, British Columbia
				Stadium: Empire Stadium; Attendance: 6,012
