= Lagendijk =

Lagendijk is a Dutch surname. Notable people with the surname include:

- Joost Lagendijk (born 1957), Dutch politician
- Ger Lagendijk (1941–2010), Dutch footballer
- Ad Lagendijk (born 1947), Dutch physicist
