= Akhmanov =

Akhmanov (Russian: Ахманов) is a Slavic masculine surname; its feminine counterpart is Akhmanova. It may refer to the following notable people:

- Alexey Akhmanov (1897–1949), Soviet Army lieutenant general
- Anna Akhmanova (born 1967), Russian-born biologist
