= The Gorzen =

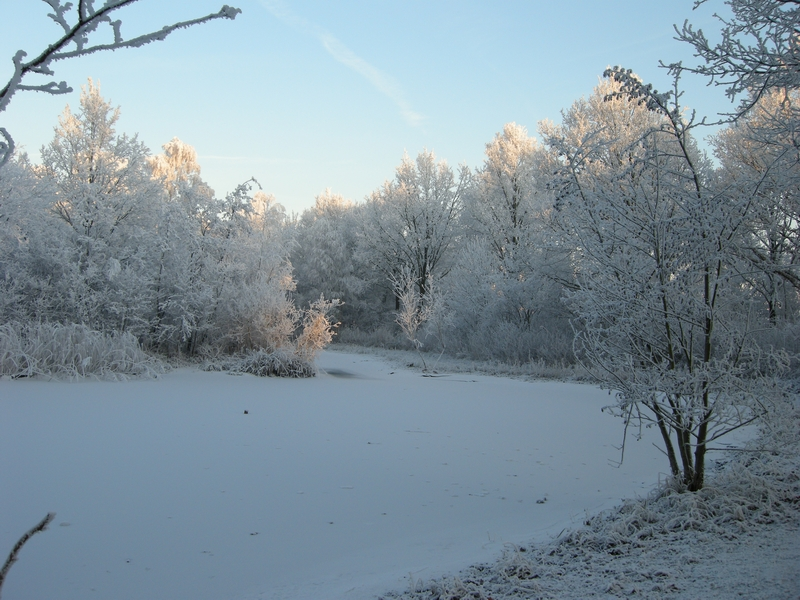
- The Gorzenpark landscape
- Interactive map of The Gorzen
- Type: Nature park
- Location: The Netherlands, Ridderkerk
- Coordinates: 51°52′10″N 4°37′30″E
- Area: 98.84 acres (40.00 ha)
- Status: Open all year

The Gorzen is a nature park in the Dutch province of South Holland, located on the eastside of Ridderkerk, between the New Veer and the New harbor. The nature- and recreational park The Gorzen is a former dumpsite with a total area of 40 acres (16 ha). The park was formed in consequences of all kinds of activities and circumstances in a period of half a century shaped in a hillside nature park with a few lakes and brooks.
