= Detroit Cougars =

Detroit Cougars can refer to:

- Detroit Cougars (NHL), original name of the Detroit Red Wings (1926–1930)
- Detroit Cougars (soccer), a US soccer team from 1967 to 1968
