= Huib Bakker =

Dutch physicist

Huib Johan Bakker (born 2 March 1965) is a Dutch physicist working in the field of ultrafast spectroscopy. He has been president of research institute AMOLF since 1 February 2016.

== Career ==
Bakker was born on 2 March 1965 in Haarlem. He studied physical chemistry at the Vrije Universiteit Amsterdam, and obtained his master's degree in 1987. He subsequently became a PhD student under Ad Lagendijk at the AMOLF research institute. Bakker received his doctorate cum laude in 1991 with a thesis titled:"Time-resolved vibrational spectroscopy with picosecond infrared pulses". Between 1991 and 1994 he was a scientific assistant at the Institute of Semiconductor Technologies of RWTH Aachen University in Germany.

In 1995 Bakker returned to the Netherlands to become scientific group leader at AMOLF. Six years later he started as professor of Ultrafast Spectroscopy of Molecules in the Condensed Phase at the University of Amsterdam. At AMOLF Bakker is group leader of research on ultrafast spectroscopy. In 2003 he became head of the department of molecular nanophysics. In his research at AMOLF Bakker has been founder of a technique which uses special non-linear spectroscopics, which helps researchers in determining the molecular mobility and structure of water in complex systems.

Bakker became adjunct director of AMOLF on 1 September 2015. On 1 February 2016 he succeeded Vinod Subramaniam as director, who became rector-magnificus of the Vrije Universiteit Amsterdam.

== Awards and honors ==
In 2005 Bakker received the gold medal of the Royal Netherlands Chemical Society. Bakker was elected a member of the Royal Netherlands Academy of Arts and Sciences in 2015. The academy called him "a renowned expert on the molecular properties of water and ice".
