= Vergunst =

Vergunst is a surname. Notable people with the surname include:

- Flora Lagerwerf-Vergunst (born 1964), Dutch judge, politician and educator
- Nicolaas Vergunst (born 1958), South African writer
