= AMOLF =

Dutch research institute

Coordinates: 52°21′19″N 4°57′07″E

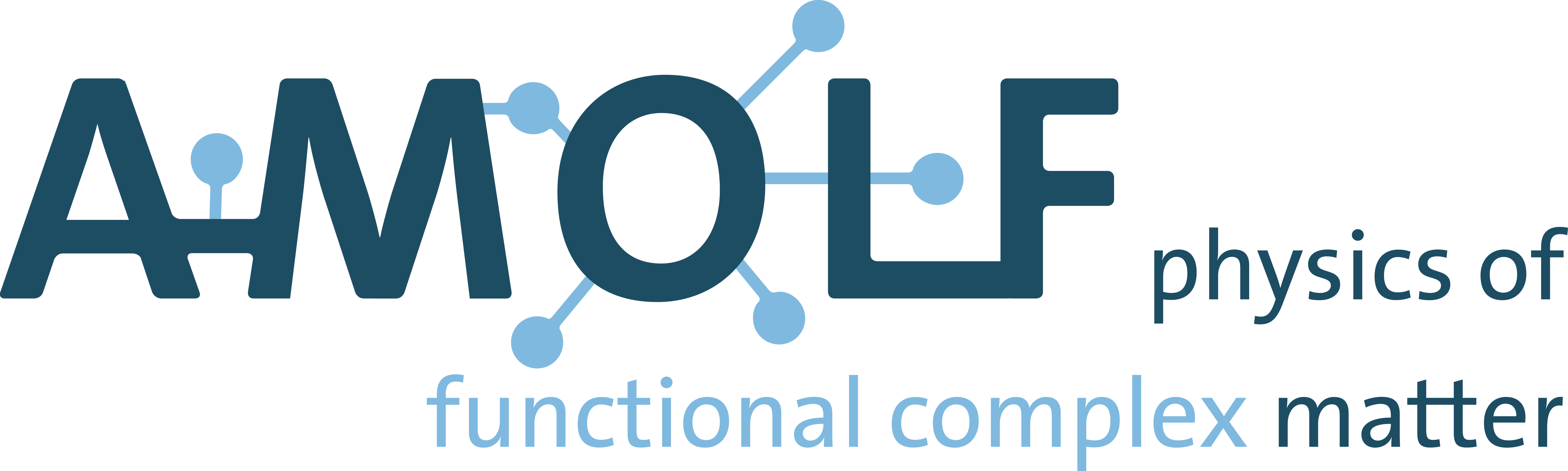

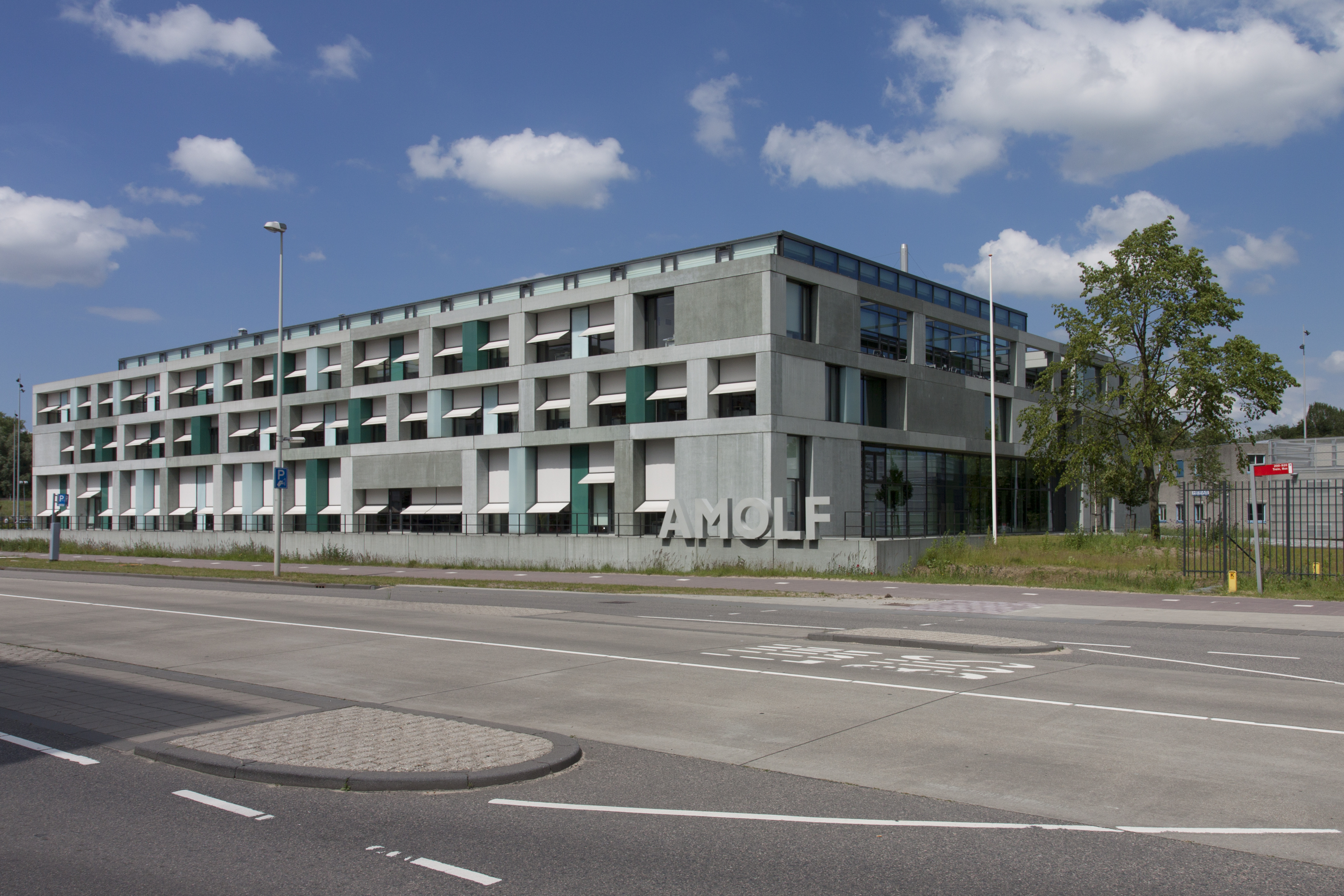
- AMOLF 2012
- Location: Science Park 104, Amsterdam, Netherlands
- Leader: Bruno Ehrler
- Staff: about 200
- Website: https://www.amolf.nl/
- AMOLF was founded in 1949

AMOLF is a research institute and part of the institutes organization of the Dutch Research Council (NWO). AMOLF carries out fundamental research on the physics and design principles of natural and man-made complex matter. AMOLF uses these insights to create novel functional materials and find new solutions to societal challenges in renewable energy, green ICT and healthcare. AMOLF is located at the Amsterdam Science Park.

AMOLF used to be part of the Dutch Foundation for Fundamental Research on Matter (FOM). On 31 December 2016 FOM integrated in NWO.

== History ==
The institute was established in 1949 by the government as the FOM Laboratory for Mass Spectrography. In 1960, it was renamed to Laboratory for Mass Separation, and in 1966 it was reorganized into a research institute and renamed FOM Institute for Atomic and Molecular Physics (AMOLF).

The original research goal was to demonstrate the separation of uranium isotopes by electromagnetic separation methods, a topic of great strategic importance after World War II. To reach this goal, a number of novel analytical instruments were developed, starting with the development of mass-spectrometric tools. In 1953 AMOLF was the first European institute to successfully enrich Uranium. Soon after, research on thermal diffusion in gases followed, as did ultracentrifuge concepts, cathode dispersion, excitation of gases by using energetic ions and research on molecular beams. The gas-ultracentrifuge developed at AMOLF (under Jacob Kistemaker) provided a base for the commercial enrichment of Uranium at the today well-known company of URENCO in Almelo.

== Structure and organization ==
AMOLF functions as an incubator for Dutch science, both in terms of launching new research themes and in terms of training talented scientists. AMOLF is headed by its director Bruno Ehrler, who succeeded Huib Bakker on 1 January 2026. The organization has 19 research groups headed by tenured or tenure-track group leaders. AMOLF employs about 130 researchers and 70 employees for technical and administrative support.

== Research ==
AMOLF’s research program was reorganized in 2022 into three interconnected themes that emphasize interdisciplinary approaches to complex matter.

The current research themes are:

- Sustainable Energy Materials: Research focused on using nanophotonics and nanomaterials to convert sunlight into electricity and chemical fuels. This includes development of advanced solar cells and photocatalytic systems.
- Information in Matter: Investigation of how physical systems gather, store, and process information, spanning from biological networks to quantum systems. Research explores fundamental physical limits of information processing and novel computing paradigms including mechanical and optical computing.
- Autonomous Matter: Study of self-organizing systems at the intersection of chemistry, physics, and biology. Research topics include out-of-equilibrium chemical reactions, cellular organization, and programmable mechanical metamaterials that exhibit adaptive behavior.

These themes replaced the institute’s previous organizational structure of four themes: Nanophotonics, Nanophotovoltaics, Designer Matter, and Living Matter.

AMOLF publishes each year on average 15 PhD theses and over 120 papers.

== Notable researchers ==
- Bruno Ehrler
- Huib Bakker
- Marileen Dogterom (worked at AMOLF from 1997 to 2013)
- Daan Frenkel
- Ad Lagendijk
- Albert Polman
