= Albert Polman =

Dutch physicist (born 1961)

Albert Polman (born 21 April 1961, Groningen) is a Dutch physicist and former director of the AMOLF research laboratory in Amsterdam.

Polman received his master's degree in physics (1985) and his Ph.D. degree in materials science and engineering (1989) from the University of Utrecht. From 1989 to 1991 he was a post-doctoral staff researcher at AT&T Bell Laboratories (Murray Hill, New Jersey). Since 1991 he has been associated with AMOLF, first as a group leader, since 1999 also as a department head. In 2005 he initiated the Center for Nanophotonics at AMOLF; in 2006 he was appointed as director of AMOLF. Polman was one of the initiators of the Amsterdam nanoCenter, a regional facility for nanofabrication founded in 2003. From March 2003 to February 2004 he was on sabbatical leave at Caltech, where he was a research associate in the group of Prof. H.A. Atwater.

Polman is one of the pioneers of the research field of nanophotonics: the control, understanding, and application of light at the nanoscale. He is best known for inventing optical doping, i.e., the incorporation and optical activation of optically active ions in thin-film materials by ion implantation. Polman's research group at AMOLF specializes in fundamental studies at the interface between optical physics and materials science.

In 2009, Albert Polman was appointed as a member of the Royal Dutch Academy of Sciences.

Polman's group invented angle-resolved cathodoluminescence imaging spectroscopy, a super-resolution method that can create images with a resolution of up to 10 nanometers. As of 2011, this technology has become commercially available.

== Selected publications ==
- Polman, A. (2008-11-07). "Applied Physics: Plasmonics Applied" (PDF). Science. 322 (5903). American Association for the Advancement of Science (AAAS): 868–869. doi:10.1126/science.1163959. ISSN 0036-8075. PMID 18988831. S2CID 206515430. Archived from the original (PDF) on 2011-07-24.
- Catchpole, K. R.; Polman, A. (2008-11-10). "Design principles for particle plasmon enhanced solar cells". Applied Physics Letters. 93 (19). AIP Publishing: 191113. Bibcode:2008ApPhL..93s1113C. doi:10.1063/1.3021072. hdl:1885/16425. ISSN 0003-6951.
- de Waele, René; Koenderink, A. Femius; Polman, Albert (2007). "Tunable Nanoscale Localization of Energy on Plasmon Particle Arrays". Nano Letters. 7 (7). American Chemical Society (ACS): 2004–2008. Bibcode:2007NanoL...7.2004D. doi:10.1021/nl070807q. ISSN 1530-6984. also featured in Nature 447, July 2007.
- Verhagen, Ewold; Kuipers, Laurens; Polman, Albert (2007). "Enhanced Nonlinear Optical Effects with a Tapered Plasmonic Waveguide". Nano Letters. 7 (2). American Chemical Society (ACS): 334–337. Bibcode:2007NanoL...7..334V. doi:10.1021/nl062440f. ISSN 1530-6984. PMID 17297997.
- Polman, A.; Min, B.; Kalkman, J.; Kippenberg, T. J.; Vahala, K. J. (2004-02-16). "Ultralow-threshold erbium-implanted toroidal microlaser on silicon". Applied Physics Letters. 84 (7). AIP Publishing: 1037–1039. Bibcode:2004ApPhL..84.1037P. doi:10.1063/1.1646748. ISSN 0003-6951.
- Snoeks, E.; Lagendijk, A.; Polman, A. (1995-03-27). "Measuring and Modifying the Spontaneous Emission Rate of Erbium near an Interface" (PDF). Physical Review Letters. 74 (13). American Physical Society (APS): 2459–2462. Bibcode:1995PhRvL..74.2459S. doi:10.1103/physrevlett.74.2459. ISSN 0031-9007. PMID 10057933.
- Franzò, G.; Priolo, F.; Coffa, S.; Polman, A.; Carnera, A. (1994-04-25). "Room‐temperature electroluminescence from Er‐doped crystalline Si". Applied Physics Letters. 64 (17). AIP Publishing: 2235–2237. Bibcode:1994ApPhL..64.2235F. doi:10.1063/1.111655. ISSN 0003-6951.

== See also ==
- Daan Frenkel
