= John Parke (footballer) =

Association footballer from Northern Ireland

Personal information
- Date of birth: 6 August 1937
- Place of birth: Bangor, Northern Ireland
- Date of death: 27 August 2011 (aged 74)
- Place of death: Belfast, Northern Ireland
- Position: Defender

Youth career
- Cliftonville

Senior career*
Years	Team	Apps	(Gls)
1954–1963	Linfield		
1963–1964	Hibernian	21	(0)
1964–1968	Sunderland	85	(0)
1967	→ Vancouver Royal Canadians (loan)	7	(0)
1968	KV Mechelen	39	(0)
Total		152+	(0+)

International career
1963–1967	Northern Ireland	14	(0)
- * Club domestic league appearances and goals

John Parke (6 August 1937 – 27 August 2011) was a footballer, who played for Linfield, Hibernian, Sunderland, Vancouver Royal Canadians, KV Mechelen and the Northern Ireland national football team as a full back.

== Club career ==
He started his professional footballing career in his native Northern Ireland with Cliftonville before joining their rivals Linfield in 1954. Having been a key player in the club's 'Seven Trophy' season of 1961/62, he moved to Scotland with Hibernian in 1963 where he made 23 appearances, scoring no goals. Parke moved to Sunderland in November 1964 and made his debut on 21 November, against Sheffield United in a 3–0 defeat at Bramall Lane. He went on to make 85 league appearances for the club. He joined Belgian club KV Mechelen before retiring in 1968.

== International career ==
He won his first cap for Northern Ireland on 12 November 1963 in a 2–1 win against Scotland. He went on to make a further 13 caps for his country, making it a total of 14 caps, with 0 goals.

== Death ==
Parke died of Alzheimer's disease in 2011, aged 74.
