= Marileen Dogterom =

Dutch biophysicist (born 1967)

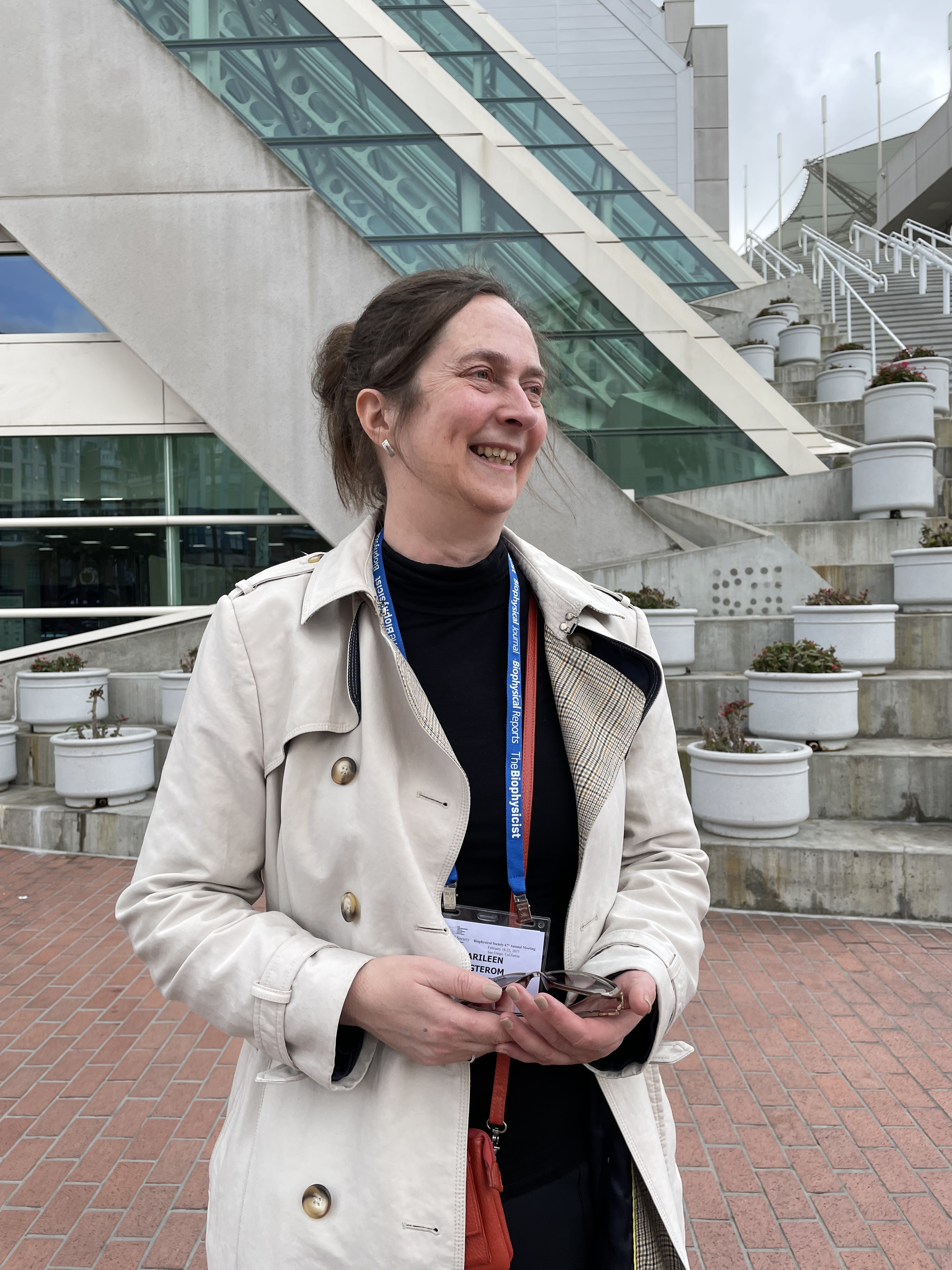
- Scientist Marileen Dogterom at the 2023 Biophysical Society Meeting in San Diego
- Born: 20 November 1967 (age 58); Utrecht, Netherlands
- Citizenship: The Netherlands
- Education: University of Groningen, University of Paris-Sud (doctorate)
- Awards: Spinoza Prize (2018); Suffrage Science award (2017)
- Scientific career
- Fields: Biophysics
- Workplaces: Delft University of Technology, Leiden University
- Thesis: Physical Aspects of Microtubule Growth and Mitotic Spindle Formation (1994)
- Doctoral advisor: Stanislas Leibler

Marileen Dogterom (born 20 November 1967, in Utrecht) is a Dutch biophysicist and professor at the Kavli Institute of Nanoscience at Delft University of Technology. She is notable for her research of the cell cytoskeleton. She was awarded the 2018 Spinoza Prize for her research.

== Life and career ==
Dogterom was born 20 November 1967 in Utrecht, the Netherlands. In 1990, she earned a degree in theoretical physics from the University of Groningen. Two years later, the Fulbright Program granted her a fellowship. Though she found a PhD position at the University of Paris-Sud, she followed her mentor (Stanislas Leibler) to Princeton University, where Dogterom began to work with biological systems via a collaboration with their biology faculty. In 1994, she graduated cum laude with a doctorate from the University of Paris-Sud, with a thesis on "Physical Aspects of Microtubule Growth and Mitotic Spindle Formation," and worked as a postdoc at Bell Labs in the United States. In 1997, she became a project leader at FOM Institute AMOLF, a physics and biophysics research institute, becoming head of department from 2003 to 2013.

Dogterom holds professional ties to various universities. In 2000, she became a professor at Leiden University, and become a full professor in 2010. She was the Chair of the Department of Bionanoscience at the Kavli Institute of Nanoscience at Delft University of Technology from 2014 to 2021. Since 2016, she has held the title of "Medical Delta Professor," meaning she held professorships at both Delft and Leiden.

In 2006, Dogterom took a sabbatical for a year to work at Erasmus MC in Anna Akhmanova's research group, which specialized in cell biology and cytoskeletons. In 2013, they received an ERC Synergy grant to collaborate on research on cytoskeleton regulation by the cell.

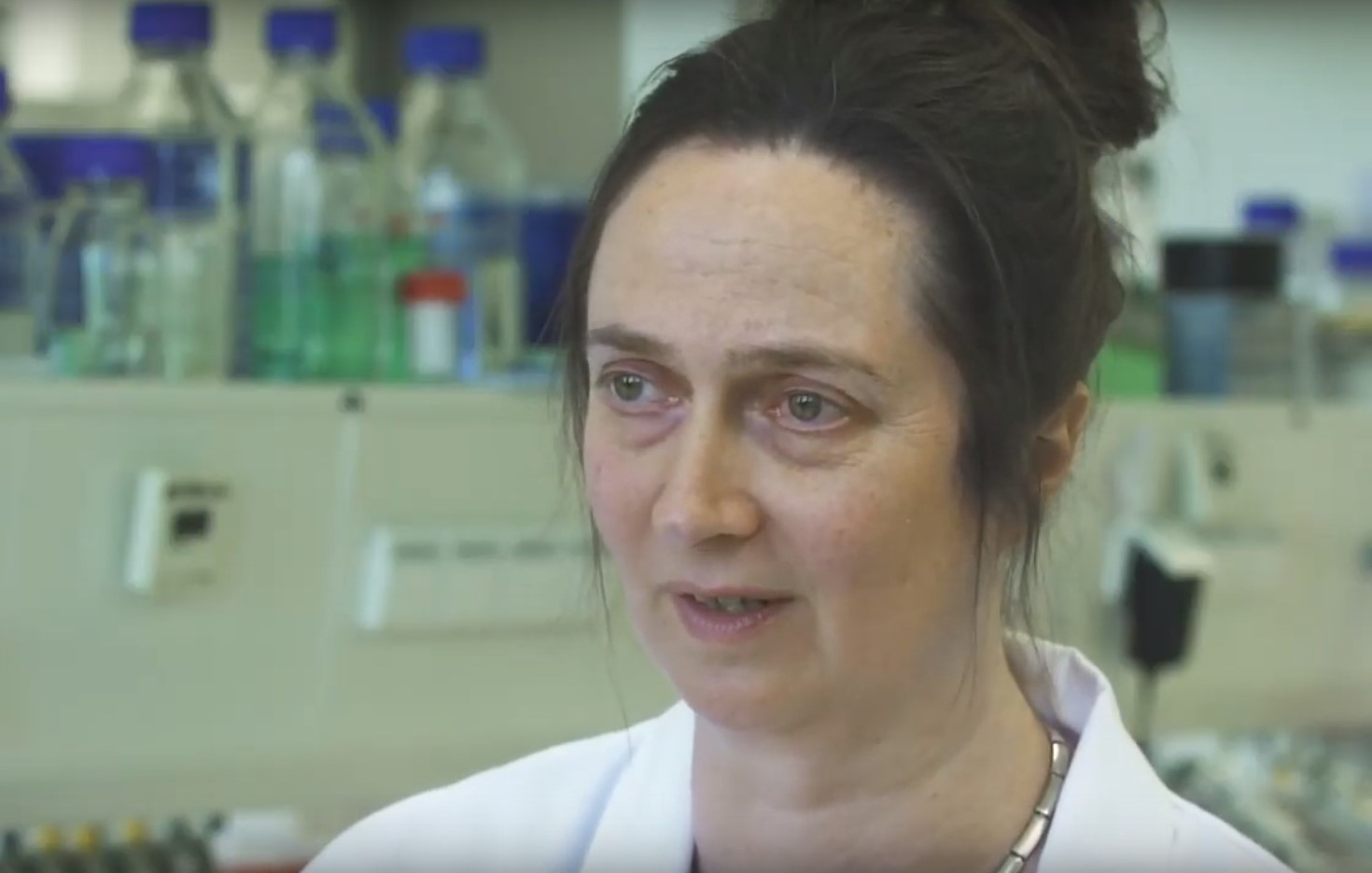
Dogterom in 2019

Dogterom currently leads a team that aims to build the first artificial cell. In her laboratory, her team studies and builds parts of the cytoskeleton outside of the cell, where they can measure the forces they exert on various other cell components. The team also analyses the effects of various forces on the deformation of the cytoskeleton, the interactions of the cytoskeleton polymers as a network, and the spatial structure of the cell itself. Her research group plans to collaborate with various other research groups that focus on other parts of the cell.

In 2018, Dogterom was awarded a Spinoza Prize, which grants a large sum to a team conducting novel research in the Netherlands. Dogterom's former colleague Anna Akhmanova was awarded a Spinoza Prize in the same year. Dogterom served as Vice President of the Royal Netherlands Academy of Arts and Sciences from 2020 to 2022, and as President from 2022 to 2026.

== Awards ==
In 2013, Dogterom was elected to the European Molecular Biology Organization (EMBO), and in 2015, she was elected to the Academia Europaea. She has been a member of the Royal Netherlands Academy of Arts and Sciences since 2016. Dogterom has been awarded the following grants, fellowships, and prizes:

- 2025 - Professor of Excellence Award | Leermeesterprjis
- 2019 - Fellow of the Biophysical Society
- 2018 – Spinoza Prize
- 2017 - Engineering and Physical Sciences Suffrage Science award
- 2015 – Dutch Physical Prize (Yearly Award from the Dutch Physical Society)
- 2013 – ERC Synergy grant (with Anna Akhmanova at Utrecht University)
- 2007 – VICI Award, NWO Vernieuwingsimpuls
- 1992 – Fulbright Fellowship, The Netherlands
- 1991 – EMBO Short Term Fellowship (Heidelberg, Germany)
- 1988 – Fellowship from the Italian Ministry of Foreign Affairs (Rome, Italy)
