= Antonio Collar =

Spanish footballer (born 1933)

Personal information
- Full name: Antonio Collar Monterrubio
- Date of birth: 7 March 1933 (age 93)
- Place of birth: San Juan de Aznalfarache, Spain
- Height: 1.77 m (5 ft 10 in)
- Position: Defender

Youth career
- 1949–1952: Atlético Madrid

Senior career*
Years	Team	Apps	(Gls)
1952–1961	Atlético Madrid	9	(1)
1953–1954	→ Cádiz (loan)	20	(0)
1954–1955	→ Murcia (loan)	4	(0)
1958–1961	→ Deportivo	46	(11)
1961–1967	Las Palmas	55	(3)
1968	Vancouver Royals	20	(0)
Total		154	(15)

Managerial career
- 1988–1989: Telde
- 1989: Maspalomas
- * Club domestic league appearances and goals

Antonio Collar Monterrubio (born 7 March 1933) is a Spanish former football player and manager.

In his playing career as a defender, he played 15 games and scored once in La Liga for Atlético Madrid and Las Palmas. He added 99 games and 14 goals in the Segunda División, for Murcia, Deportivo and Las Palmas.

== Early life ==
Collar was born in San Juan de Aznalfarache in the Province of Seville. His father was from Tomelloso in the Province of Ciudad Real, and his mother was from Bilbao. He was one of four sons and two daughters, and moved to Madrid due to his father's banking job, around 1946.

== Career ==
After attending a trial with his brother Enrique in 1949, Collar was assigned to the youth team at Atlético Madrid. In 1952–53, they were loaned to Cádiz in the Tercera División, with their other two brothers. He missed the 1953–54 season due to compulsory military service with the Spanish Air Force. In 1954–55 he and his brother were loaned to Real Murcia, where they won the Segunda División; he was then loaned to Deportivo.

In 1961, Collar joined Las Palmas, where he shared teams with several players who would help the club finish runners-up in La Liga in 1968–69; besides the two Basque goalkeepers, he was the only mainlander on the team. He left in 1968 for the Vancouver Royals in the nascent North American Soccer League, managed by Ferenc Puskás. He played 20 games in his one season in Canada.

Returning to the Canary Islands, Collar managed several clubs, including Telde and Maspalomas in the 1988–89 Segunda División B.

== Personal life ==
After retiring from football, Collar distributed a wine brand from La Rioja throughout the Canary Islands, and antifouling paint for boats. He became a board member at the Real Club Náutico de Gran Canaria. At age 82, he exercised for at least an hour every morning.

Collar met his wife, a Canarian from Arucas, in 1962. They had two sons; the elder was a youth player at Real Madrid but pursued a law degree and became a banker, while the younger went into real estate.
