= Jan van der Graaf =

Dutch church administrator (1937–2022)

- Born: 12 January 1937; Ridderkerk, Netherlands
- Died: 14 October 2022 (aged 85); Huizen, Netherlands
- Occupation(s): Church administrator, editor, author
- Known for: General Secretary of the Reformed Association in the Dutch Reformed Church
- Relatives: Christian minister Bas Plaisier

Jan van der Graaf (12 January 1937 – 14 October 2022) was a Dutch church administrator and engineer. He was General Secretary of the Reformed Association in the Dutch Reformed Church between 1973 and 2000. Van der Graaf also wrote several books, was chief editor of the Reformed Association's magazine De Waarheidsvriend and associated with the Evangelische Omroep.

For the most part of his youth he was a member of the Reformed Congregations. Although Van der Graaf didn't study theology - instead, he studied chemical technology at Delft University of Technology and did some teaching afterwards - he acted like a theologian. He was an iconic personality in representing the Reformed Association (Gereformeerde Bond).

Van der Graaf was awarded an honorary doctorate from the Károli Gáspár University of the Reformed Church in Hungary in 1994.

Van der Graaf died in Huizen on 14 October 2022, at the age of 85.

== Relatives ==
Former Secretary General of the Protestant Church in the Netherlands Bas Plaisier (born 1946) is his brother-in-law.

== Bibliography ==
Books of Jan van der Graaf:

- Delen of helen? : kroniek van hervormd kerkelĳk leven in en met de Gereformeerde Bond, 1951-1981 (2002) ISBN 9043504564
- De Nederlandse Hervormde Kerk : belĳdend onderweg : 1951-1981-2001 (2003) ISBN 9043506710
- Ze hadden wat te zeggen : vĳfentwintig miniaturen over reisgenoten (2004) ISBN 9058294390
- Passie voor het Evangelie : leven en werk van ds. G. Boer (2005) ISBN 9058290948
- Volkskerk in de marge : een actuele bezinning (2012), ISBN 9789088970528
- Deelgenoot van een kantelende tijd : een persoonlijke terugblik (2014), ISBN 9789462780699
