= Gert Oostindie =

Dutch historian

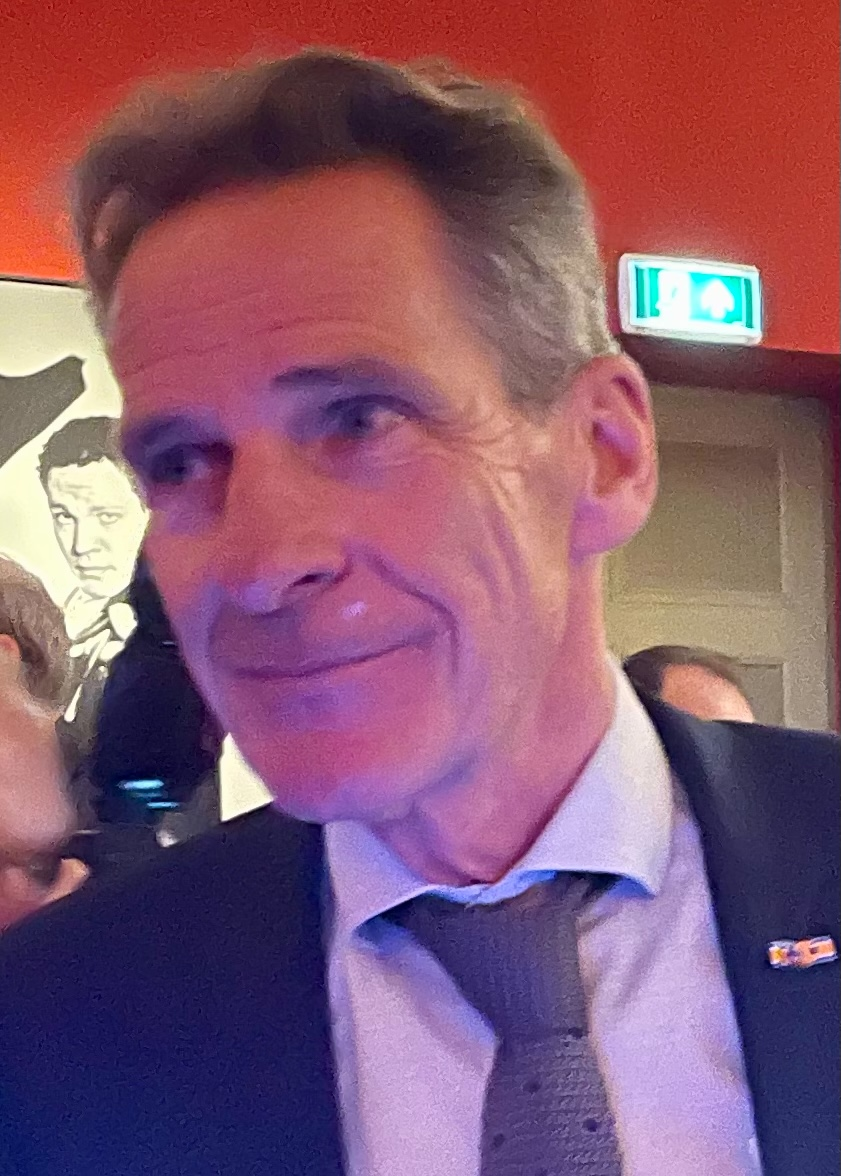
- Oostindie (2022)
- Born: Gert Jan Oostindie; 4 July 1955 (age 69); Ridderkerk, Netherlands
- Occupation(s): historian, professor

Gert Jan Oostindie (born 4 July 1955) is a Dutch historian and professor who specialises in Dutch colonial history and the Dutch Caribbean. He was Director of the Royal Netherlands Institute of Southeast Asian and Caribbean Studies (KITLV) from 2000 until 2021. From 1993 until 2006, he was professor Anthropology at the University of Utrecht. From 2006 until 2015, he was professor Caribbean History at Leiden University.

== Biography ==
Oostindie was born on 4 July 1955 in Ridderkerk, Netherlands. His surname is a variant of Oosteinde or "east end", as in Oosteinde, Groningen.

He studied history and social sciences at the Vrije Universiteit Amsterdam, and graduated in 1982. In 1989, he obtained a doctorate at Utrecht University for his thesis about the plantations Roosenburg and Mon Bijou in Suriname.

In 1983, Oostindie started working for the Royal Netherlands Institute of Southeast Asian and Caribbean Studies (KITLV). In 2000, he became Director of the institute. The institute was hit hard by subsidy cuts in 2013, and was forced to merge with the Royal Netherlands Academy of Arts and Sciences who intended to move the institute from Leiden to Amsterdam. Oostindie managed to keep the institute in Leiden, but had to dismiss half the staff. In December 2021, he retired as Director and was awarded officer in the Order of Orange-Nassau.

Oostindie was appointed professor Anthropology with a specialisation on the Caribbean at the University of Utrecht on 1993 and served until 2006. From 2006 until 2015, he was professor Caribbean History at Leiden University.

Oostindie is a prolific writer on the history of the Dutch Caribbean and Suriname who specialises in the colonial history and slavery past of the Netherlands. He tried to increase the understanding of the Dutch Caribbean which was often overshadowed by the Dutch East Indies (Indonesia) and Suriname. As of 2015, he was the author of more than 25 books and more than 150 scientific articles. Oostindie frequently appears in the mass media as an expert on colonial history and slavery.
