= Tim Eekman =

Dutch footballer (born 1991)

Personal information
- Date of birth: 5 August 1991 (age 35)
- Place of birth: Ridderkerk, Netherlands
- Height: 1.71 m (5 ft 7 in)
- Position: Right-back

Youth career
- Rijsoord
- Feyenoord

Senior career*
Years	Team	Apps	(Gls)
2010–2014	Excelsior	47	(0)
2014–2018	Barendrecht	126	(23)
2018–2019	Kozakken Boys	28	(0)
2019–2024	Barendrecht	124	(14)
2024–2026	Smitshoek	0	(0)
- * Club domestic league appearances and goals as of 09:57, 6 October 2024 (UTC)

Tim Eekman (Dutch pronunciation: [tɪm ˈeːkmɑn]; born 5 August 1991) is a Dutch retired footballer who played as a right-back.

== Club career ==
He formerly played for Excelsior and joined amateur side Barendrecht in summer 2014.
