= Bruno Ehrler =

Physicist and materials scientist

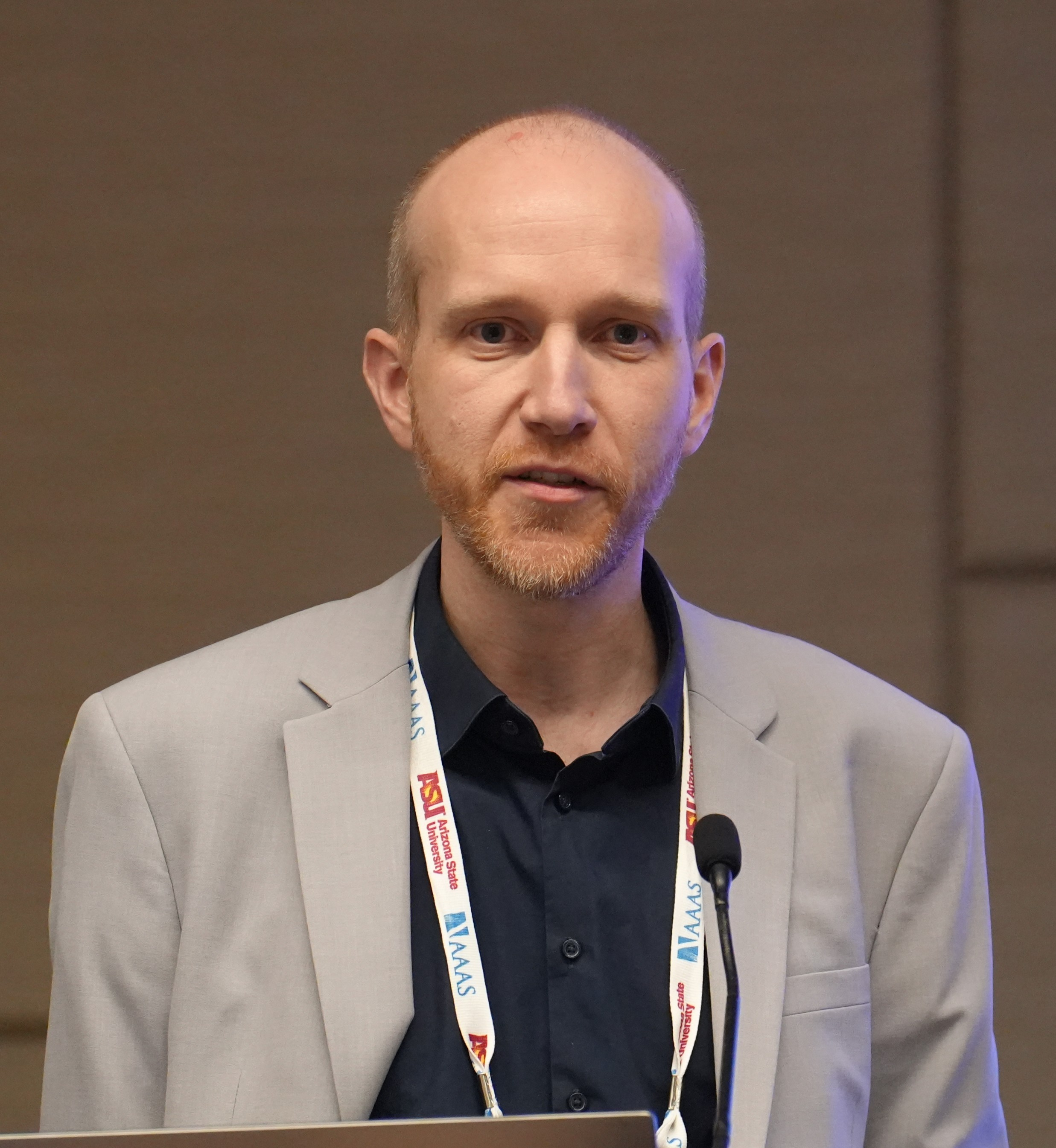
- Ehrler in 2026
- Education: RWTH Aachen University; Queen Mary University of London; University of Cambridge
- Known for: Perovskite semiconductors; hybrid solar cells; neuromorphic perovskite devices
- Awards: KNCV Gold Medal (2025); ACS Energy Letters Lectureship Award (2025); ERC Starting Grant (2020)
- Scientific career
- Fields: Photovoltaics; Materials science; Optoelectronics
- Workplaces: AMOLF; University of Groningen; University of Cambridge
- Thesis: (2012)
- Doctoral advisor: Neil Greenham

Bruno Ehrler is a physicist and materials scientist whose research centers on perovskite semiconductors, hybrid solar cells, and neuromorphic devices. He leads the Hybrid Solar Cells group at AMOLF and has been appointed as the next director of the institute effective 1 January 2026. Since 2020 he has been an honorary professor at the University of Groningen.

== Education and career ==
Ehrler studied physics at RWTH Aachen University and Queen Mary University of London, receiving an MSci in 2009. He completed a PhD in physics at the University of Cambridge in 2012 under Neil Greenham on hybrid solar cells that combine organic semiconductors with inorganic quantum dots.

After his doctorate, Ehrler joined the Cambridge Optoelectronics Group as a postdoctoral researcher with Richard Friend, working on quantum dots, doped metal oxides, and singlet fission photovoltaics. He was Trevelyan Research Fellow at Selwyn College, Cambridge from 2013 to 2014.

In 2014 he moved to AMOLF as Group Leader of the Hybrid Solar Cells group. He became head of the LMPV – Sustainable Energy Materials Department in 2024, and in August 2025 was named the next director of AMOLF, to take office on 1 January 2026.

== Research ==
Ehrler's research focuses on the physics and chemistry of perovskite semiconductors. He has worked on how ionic migration affects device stability and efficiency, and developing spectroscopic and simulation tools. His group found that mechanical strain can control ion mobility, opening new ways for improving perovskite solar cell performance. In addition to photovoltaics, Ehrler's group has worked on the use of perovskites in neuromorphic computing, creating artificial synapses and neurons with very low energy consumption.

== Policy roles ==
Ehrler is active in Dutch and European research policy, serving as vice-chair of the Netherlands Energy Research Alliance (NERA) and Program Director of SolarLab. He was part of founding the national research programs SolarNL and MaterialenNL.

== Awards and honours ==
- 2025 – KNCV Gold Medal (Royal Netherlands Chemical Society)
- 2025 – ACS Energy Letters Lectureship Award
- 2023 – Elected to the Young Academy of Europe in 2023.
- 2020 – ERC Starting Grant for work on artificial synapses from halide perovskites
