= Ike MacKay =

Canadian former soccer forward (born 1948)

Personal information
- Date of birth: August 2, 1948 (age 78)
- Place of birth: Gabriola Island, British Columbia, Canada
- Position: Forward

Youth career
- Alberta Golden Bears

Senior career*
Years	Team	Apps	(Gls)
1968	Vancouver Royals	15	(2)
1976–1978	Portland Timbers	51	(4)

International career
1972–1977	Canada	9	(1)

Managerial career
- Canadian Futsal Women
- * Club domestic league appearances and goals

Ike MacKay (born August 2, 1948) is a Canadian former soccer forward.

== Club career ==
A Nanaimo area product, MacKay graduated from Oak Bay High School. MacKay played four North American Soccer League seasons. He played for the Vancouver Royals in the league's inaugural season, 1968. MacKay later played three seasons with the Portland Timbers, scoring 3 goals in 10 games in 1976, 1 goal in 16 games in 1977, and 2 assists in 24 games in 1978. He missed eleven games of the 1978 North American Soccer League season as the Nanaimo school board would not approve a leave of absence from his teaching position.

== International career ==
MacKay played nine times, scoring one goal, for the Canadian national soccer team. He played in four 1974 FIFA World Cup qualification matches in 1972, scoring a goal against the Americans in a 2–2 draw. Canada failed to advance. He later played five times in 1977 in qualifying for the 1978 World Cup.

MacKay was also an Olympic soccer team member, playing in one qualifying match for the 1968 Summer Olympics. Canada lost the match played in Edmonton 1–2 to Cuba and failed to advance. He also played for the Canadian Futsal team at the 1983 Pan American Cup.

=== International goals ===
Scores and results list Canada's goal tally first.

#	Date	Venue	Opponent	Score	Result	Competition
1	29 August 1972	Memorial Stadium, Baltimore, United States	United States	1–0	2–2	1974 FIFA World Cup qualification
