= Cheung Chi Wai =

Hong Kong-born Chinese footballer

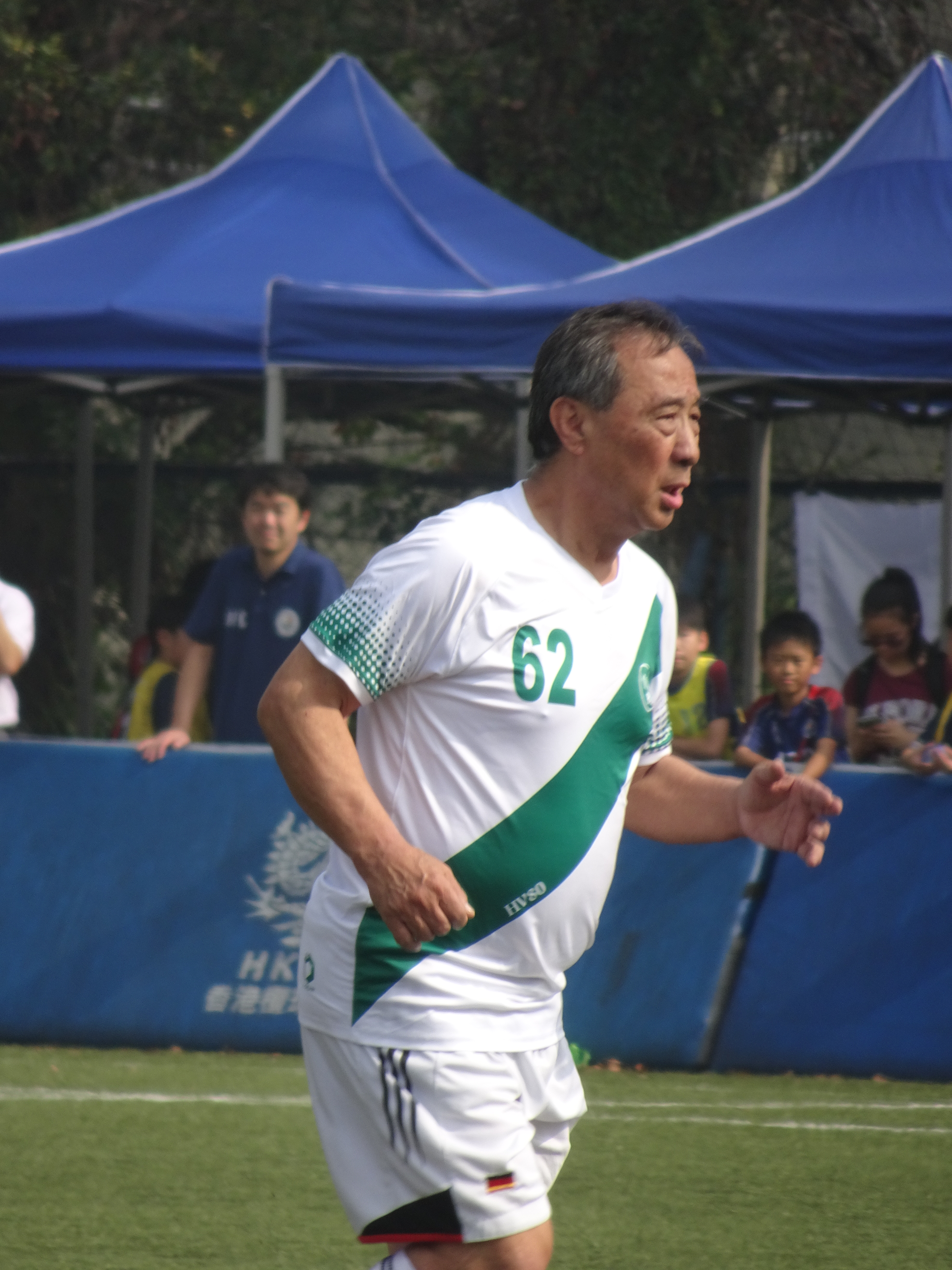

Personal information
- Date of birth: May 6, 1946 (age 80)
- Place of birth: Hong Kong
- Position: Forward

Senior career*
Years	Team	Apps	(Gls)
1960	Happy Valley		
1968	Vancouver Royals	32	(2)

International career
- Republic of China
- * Club domestic league appearances and goals

Cheung Chi Wai
- Traditional Chinese: 張子慧
- Simplified Chinese: 张子慧
Transcriptions
Standard Mandarin
- Hanyu Pinyin: Zhāng Zi Huì
Yue: Cantonese
- Yale Romanization: Jēung Jíwai
- Jyutping: zoeng1 zi2 wai6

Cheung Chi Wai (born 6 May 1946) is a former professional footballer who spent the 1968 season in the North American Soccer League, playing for the Vancouver Royals.

Born in Hong Kong, in the British Empire to ethnic Chinese parents, Cheung Chi Wai represented Republic of China (Taiwan) instead of Hong Kong nor People's Republic of China.

== Personal life ==
His father Chang King Hai (Chinese: 張金海), represented China at the 1948 Olympics.

His brother was fellow footballer Cheung Chi Doy.
