= Walter Bruce (Northern Irish footballer) =

Northern Irish footballer

Personal information
- Date of birth: 12 February 1938
- Place of birth: Belfast, Northern Ireland
- Date of death: 28 November 2015 (aged 77)
- Place of death: Bangor, Northern Ireland
- Position: Inside forward

Youth career
- Boyland

Senior career*
Years	Team	Apps	(Gls)
- East Belfast
1953–1971	Glentoran	515	(140)
1967–1968	Detroit Cougars	26	(3)

International career
1960–1967	Northern Ireland	2	(0)
1958–1967	Irish League XI	8	(0)
- * Club domestic league appearances and goals

Walter Bruce (12 February 1938 — 28 November 2015) was a Northern Irish footballer who played in the Irish League as an inside forward with Glentoran. He won two caps for Northern Ireland and eight inter-league caps for the Irish League.

With Glentoran, he won the Irish League championship on four occasions in 1963–64, 1966–67, 1967–68 and 1969–70. He won one Irish Cup (1965–66), two Gold Cups, three City Cups and one Ulster Cup. He was named Ulster Footballer of the Year for the 1966–67 season.

Bruce joined Glentoran as a sixteen-year-old in 1954, breaking into the first team towards the end of the 1955–56 season. In 1959, Bruce's 19 goals earned him the Glentoran Player of the Year title; and the following year he won his first cap in a 5–2 Home Nations Championship defeat by Scotland. In 1967, he captained Glentoran to the League title, also taking home City Cup, Gold Cup and Ulster Cup winner's medals, was crowned Ulster Footballer of the Year, and six-and-a-half years after first being capped, made the Northern Ireland team again for a 0–0 European Nations Cup qualifier with Wales. The only blip on the season was an Irish Cup final defeat, this time at the hands of Crusaders.

The summer of 1967 found the Glentoran squad travelling to North America, playing for Detroit Cougars in the inaugural United Soccer Association season.

The 1967–68 season brought Bruce another league title. Glentoran were eliminated from the European Cup by Benfica, losing on away goals after 1–1 home and 0–0 away results. Once again the 1968 summer months brought another trip to the US as Bruce, along with Glens teammate Barry Brown, re-signed for the Cougars then plying their trade in the new North American Soccer League.

From then on, Bruce's Irish League career began to slow down. He did claim another Irish League title in 1970 before retiring in 1971. His total of 529 appearances puts him third in the all-time Glentoran standings, and his 140 goals has only been bettered by ten others at the Oval.

A fitter with STC throughout his playing days, Bruce later opened a newsagent's on the Holywood Road in Belfast and settled in Bangor, County Down.

On 28 November 2015, Bruce died.
