= Flora Lagerwerf-Vergunst =

Dutch judge, politician, and educator

Everdien Flora Lagerwerf-Vergunst (born 23 May 1964 in Ede) is a Dutch judge and former politician and educator. As a member of the ChristianUnion (ChristenUnie) she was a member of the Senate from 2007 to 2011.

Lagerwerf-Vergunst studied law at Erasmus University Rotterdam. She lives in Ridderkerk, where she was politically active for the Reformatory Political Federation, a predecessor of the ChristianUnion. She is a member of the Protestant Church in the Netherlands, of which her father is a minister.
