= Allan Gauden =

English footballer (1944–2020)

Personal information
- Date of birth: 20 November 1944
- Place of birth: Ashington, England
- Date of death: 29 April 2020 (aged 75)
- Position: Midfielder

Youth career
- Langley Park Juniors

Senior career*
Years	Team	Apps	(Gls)
1962–1968	Sunderland	43	(6)
1968–1972	Darlington	127	(39)
1972–1973	Grimsby Town	55	(12)
1973–1974	Hartlepool United	63	(15)
1974–1976	Gillingham	41	(3)
Total		329	(75)
- * Club domestic league appearances and goals

Allan Gauden (20 November 1944 – 29 April 2020) was an English professional footballer who played as a midfielder. He played professionally for Sunderland, Darlington, Grimsby Town, Hartlepool United and Gillingham between 1962 and 1976, and in total made 329 appearances in the Football League, scoring 75 goals.
