= Henri Klein (footballer) =

Luxembourgish footballer (1944–1995)

Personal information
- Full name: Heinrich Eduard Klein
- Date of birth: 14 April 1944
- Place of birth: Oberkorn, Luxembourg
- Date of death: 7 September 1995 (aged 51)
- Height: 1.80 m (5 ft 11 in)
- Position: Forward

Senior career*
Years	Team	Apps	(Gls)
1961–1962	CS Oberkorn		
1962–1964	Red Boys Differdange		
1964–1966	RFC Liège	12	(3)
1966–1968	RC Tirlemont		
1968	Vancouver Royals	26	(20)
1969–1970	Red Boys Differdange		
1970–1972	Velox		
1972–1974	Red Boys Differdange		
Total		38+	(23+)

International career
1963–1969	Luxembourg	10	(4)
- * Club domestic league appearances and goals

Heinrich Eduard Klein (14 April 1944 – 7 September 1995) was a Luxembourgish footballer who played as a forward.

== Career ==
Born in Oberkorn, Klein played for CS Oberkorn, Red Boys Differdange, RFC Liège, RC Tirlemont, Vancouver Royals, and Velox.

He was an international player for Luxembourg.
