= Ger Lagendijk =

Dutch footballer and agent

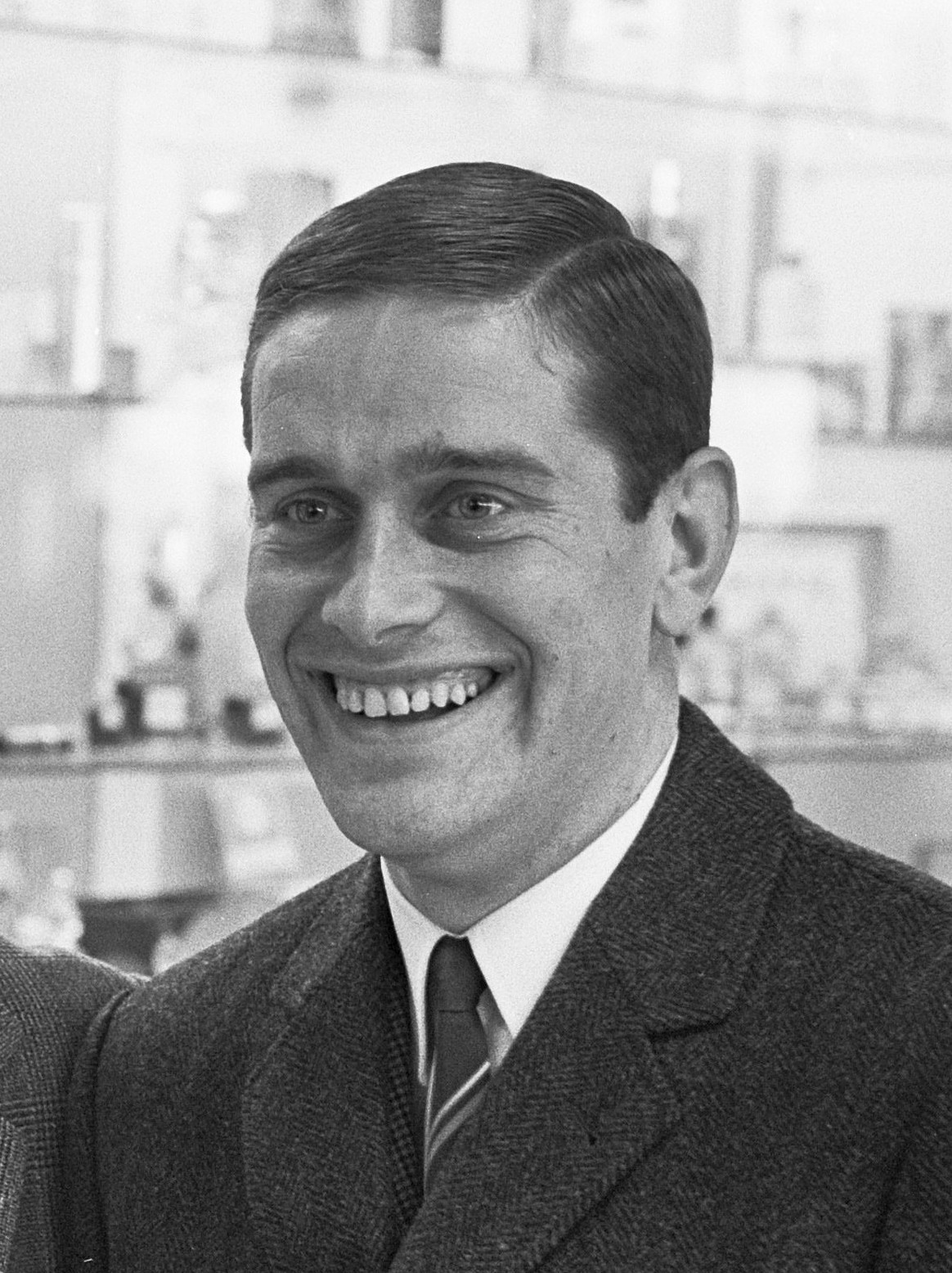
- Lagendijk in 1968

Personal information
- Full name: Gerrit Lagendijk
- Date of birth: 13 November 1941
- Place of birth: Rotterdam, Netherlands
- Date of death: 11 August 2010 (aged 68)
- Place of death: Almelo, Netherlands
- Position: Defender

Youth career
- Feyenoord

Senior career*
Years	Team	Apps	(Gls)
- ADO
- De Volewijckers
- PEC
1968	Vancouver Royals	5	(1)
- Hermes DVS
- * Club domestic league appearances and goals

Gerrit Lagendijk (13 November 1941 – 11 August 2010) was a Dutch professional football player and agent.

== Early and personal life ==
Lagendijk was born in Rotterdam and grew up in Ridderkerk.

== Playing career ==
Lagendijk began his career with the youth team of Feyenoord. He later played senior football with ADO, De Volewijckers and PEC.

He spent the 1968 season in the North American Soccer League with the Vancouver Royals, scoring one goal in five appearances.

He finished his career with Hermes DVS.

== Agent ==
After retiring as a player, Lagendijk initially worked in insurance and as an arbitrator for the VVCS football association.

Lagendijk worked as a football agent and represented a number of players, including Ronald Koeman, Erwin Koeman, Hans van Breukelen, Adri van Tiggelen, John Bosman and Ernie Brandts.

== Death ==
Lagendijk died of a heart attack on 11 August 2010, at the age of 68.
