= Lambert Maassen =

Dutch footballer

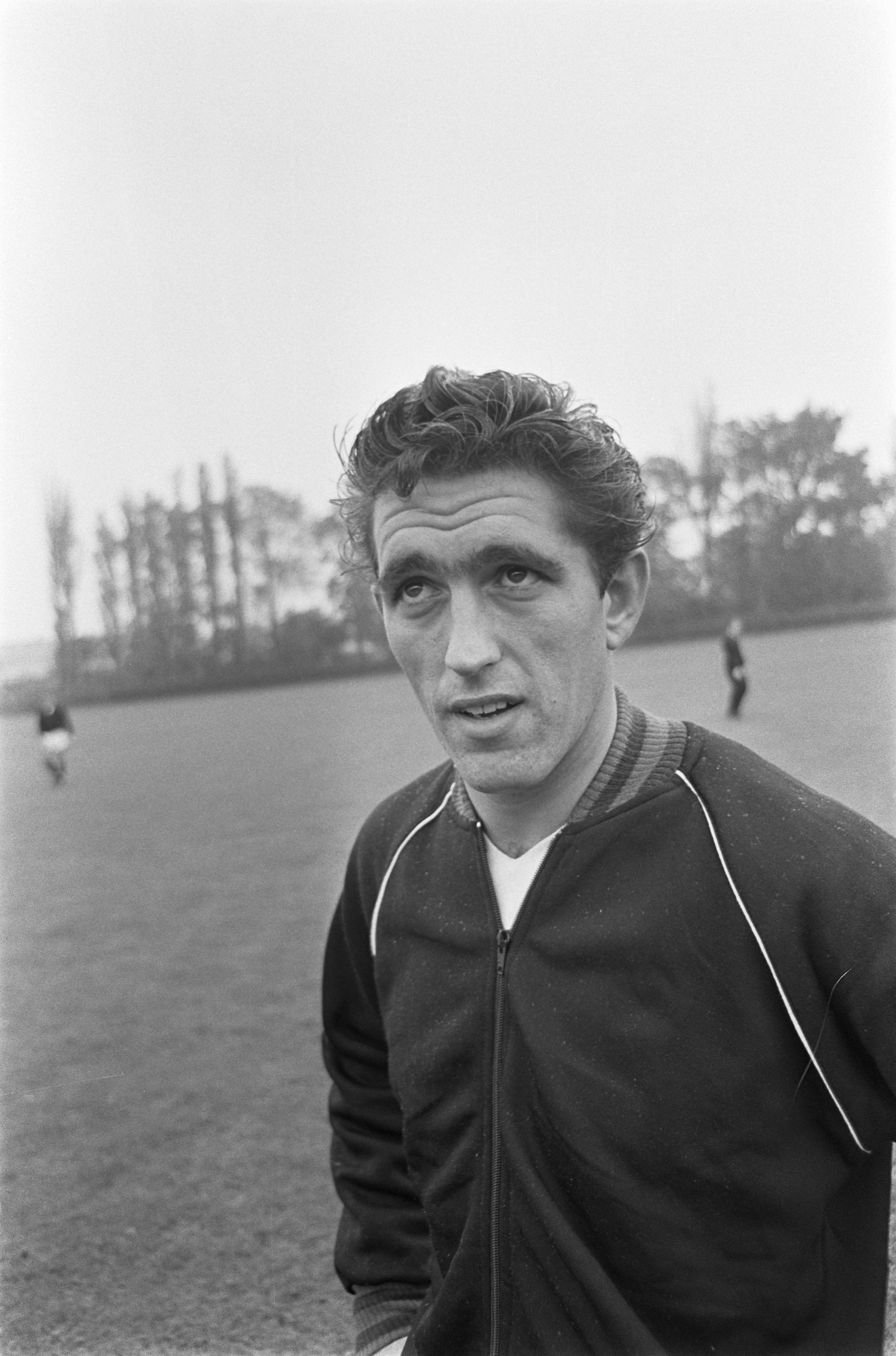

Personal information
- Date of birth: 2 September 1941
- Place of birth: Geldrop, Netherlands
- Date of death: 5 May 2018 (aged 76)
- Place of death: Geldrop, Netherlands
- Height: 6 ft 1 in (1.85 m)
- Position: Striker

Youth career
- UNA

Senior career*
Years	Team	Apps	(Gls)
1961–1963	PSV		
1963–1969	ADO Den Haag		
1967	→ San Francisco Golden Gate Gales (loan)	4	(3)
- * Club domestic league appearances and goals

Lambert Maassen (21 September 1941 – 5 May 2018) was a Dutch professional footballer who played for UNA, PSV, ADO Den Haag and the San Francisco Golden Gate Gales as a striker.
