= Brian Heslop =

English footballer

Personal information
- Full name: Brian Heslop
- Date of birth: 4 August 1947 (age 79)
- Place of birth: Carlisle, Cumberland, England
- Position: Full-back

Senior career*
Years	Team	Apps	(Gls)
1965–1967	Carlisle United	5	(0)
1967–1971	Sunderland	58	(0)
1971–1972	Northampton Town	50	(0)
1972–1976	Workington	140	(5)
1976–197?	Northwich Victoria		
- * Club domestic league appearances and goals

Brian Heslop (born 4 August 1947) is an English former professional footballer who played as a full-back for Sunderland.
