= Ridderkerk =

- Town and municipality
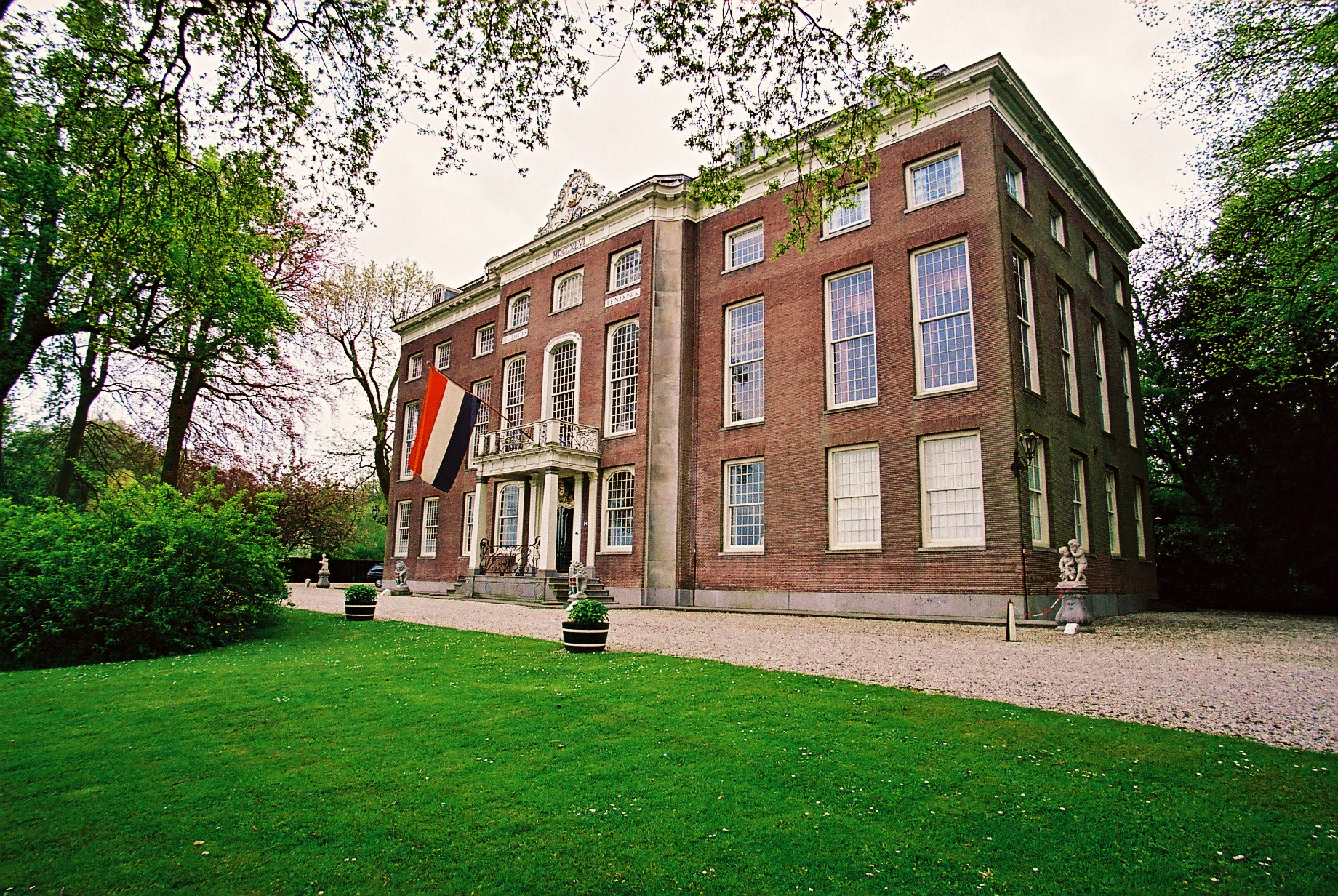
- Huys ten Donck

- Flag Coat of arms

- Location in South Holland
- Coordinates: 51°52′N 4°36′E
- Country: Netherlands
- Province: South Holland

Government
  - Body: Municipal council
  - Mayor: Marco Oosterwijk (SGP)

Area
  - Total: 25.26 km^{2} (9.75 sq mi)
  - Land: 23.72 km^{2} (9.16 sq mi)
  - Water: 1.54 km^{2} (0.59 sq mi)
- Elevation: −1 m (−3.3 ft)

Population (January 2021)
  - Total: 46,671
  - Density: 1,968/km^{2} (5,100/sq mi)
- Demonym: Ridderkerker
- Time zone: UTC+1 (CET)
  - Summer (DST): UTC+2 (CEST)
- Postcode: 2980–2989
- Area code: 0180, 078(Oostendam)
- Website: www.ridderkerk.nl

Ridderkerk (Dutch pronunciation: [ˌrɪdərˈkɛr(ə)k]) is a town and municipality in the western Netherlands, in the province of South Holland. The municipality had a population of 46,671 in 2021 and covers an area of 25.26 km^{2} (9.75 sq mi) of which 1.54 km^{2} (0.59 sq mi) is covered by water.

The municipality of Ridderkerk includes the following towns, villages and townships: Bolnes, Oostendam, Rijsoord and Slikkerveer.

Ridderkerk has a museum called De Oudheidkamer, covering the history of the town. The centre of Ridderkerk has a central square for events and there is a theater.

== Public transport ==
Waterbus

- At the Waterbus stop "de Schans" one can board the number 20 Waterbus to Dordrecht, Papendrecht, Hendrik-Ido-Ambacht, Alblasserdam, Krimpen aan den IJssel or Rotterdam.
- At the Waterbus stop "de Schans" one can also take line 6 to: Krimpen aan de Lek and Kinderdijk.

Buses

- The bus services are mostly operated by RET and they run to Rotterdam, Barendrecht and Dordrecht. There are two Arriva bus services to Zwijndrecht and Hendrik-Ido-Ambacht.

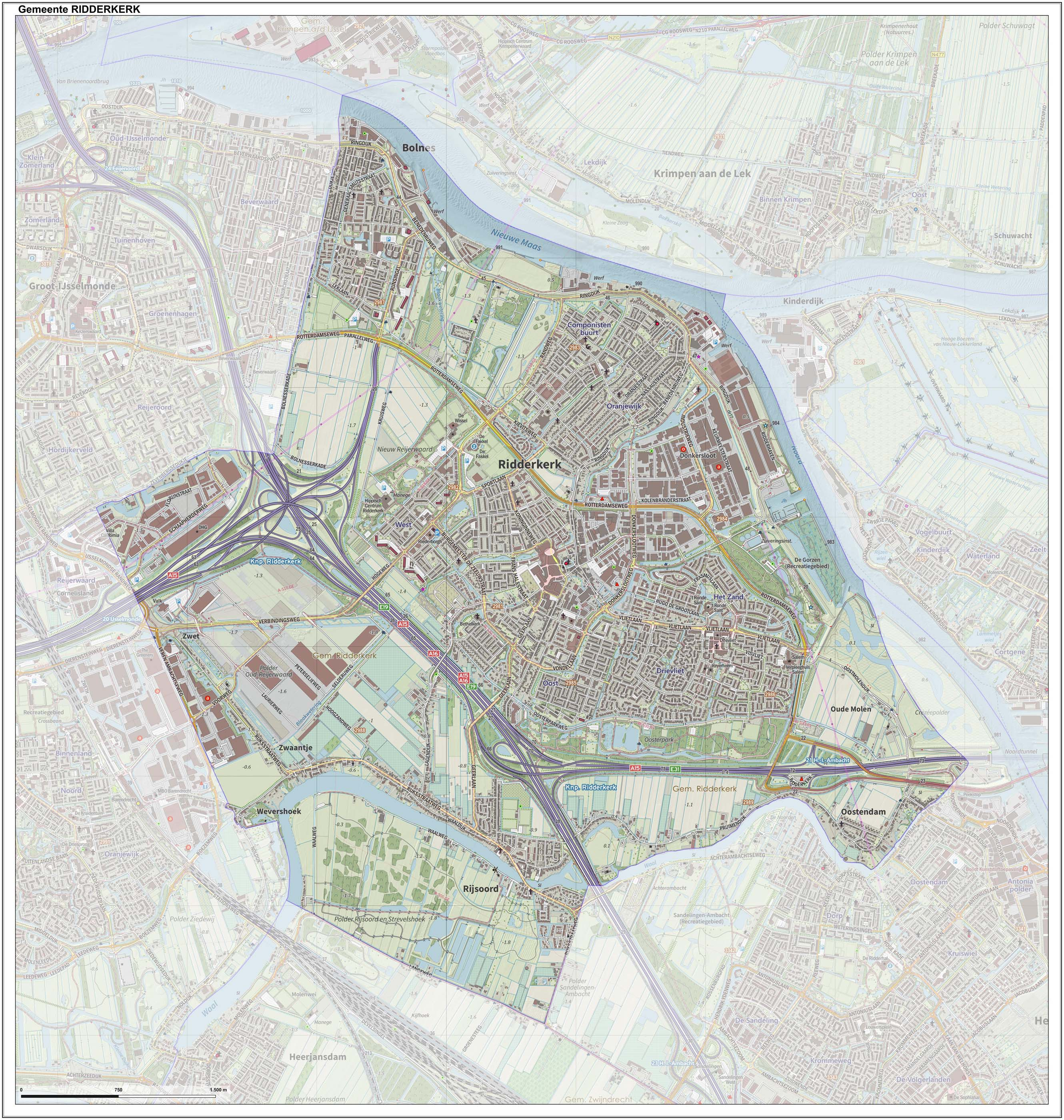
Map of the municipality of Ridderkerk

== Notable people ==
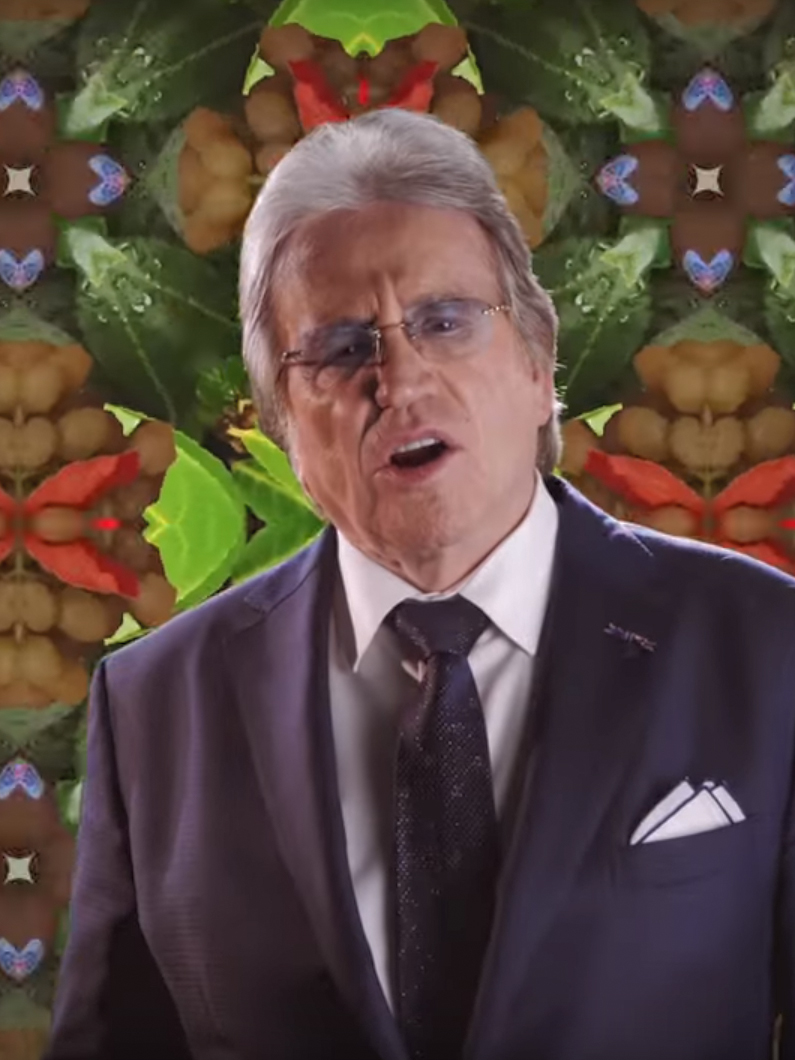
Lee Towers, 2017

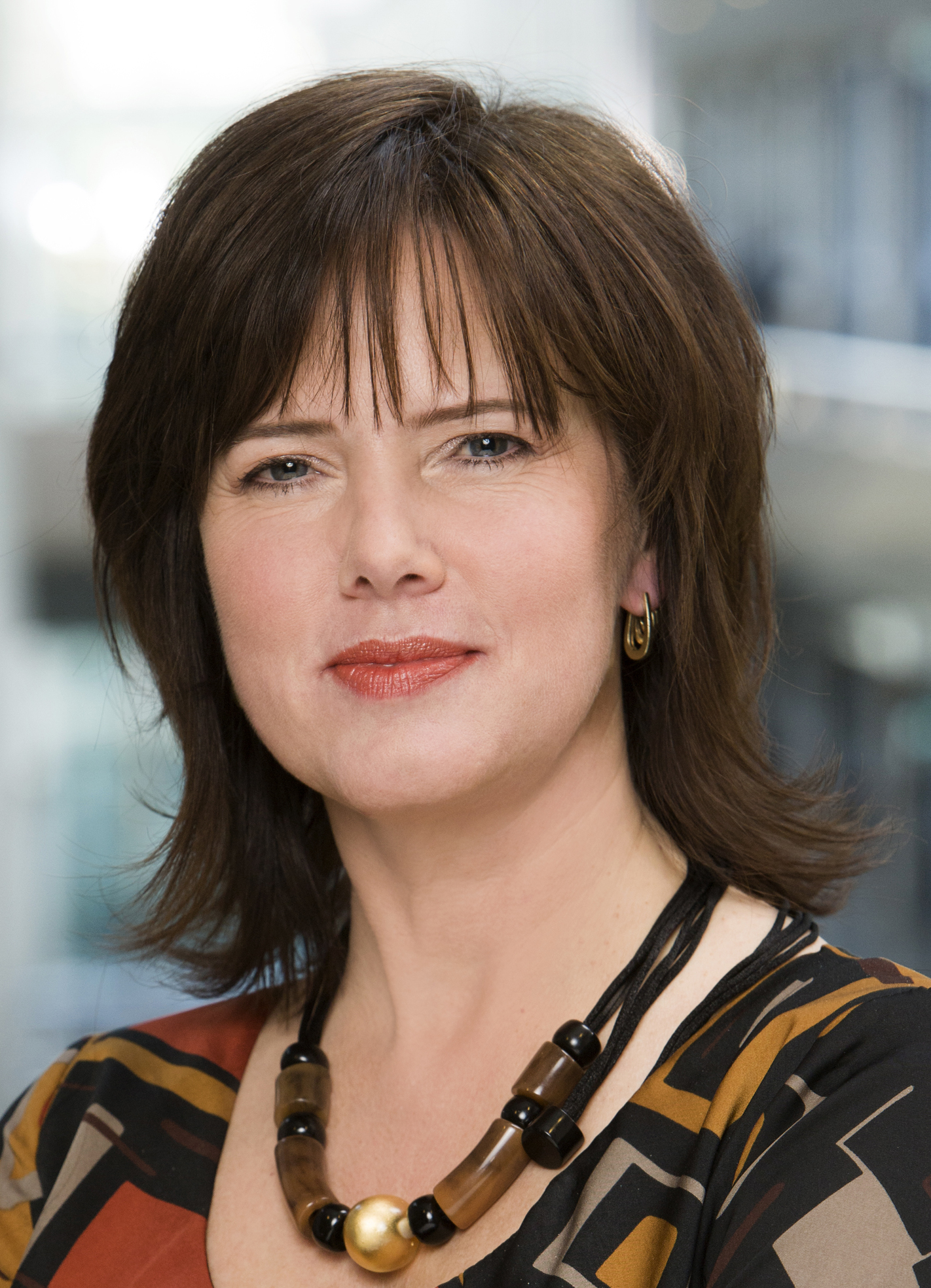
Cora van Nieuwenhuizen, 2012

- Leen van der Waal (1928–2020), politician, former Member of the European Parliament
- Jan van der Graaf (1937–2022), church administrator
- Rien Kaashoek (1937–2024), mathematician and academic
- Luuk Kroon (1942–2012), naval officer, Commander of the Royal Netherlands Navy 1995-1998
- Bas Belder (born 1946), politician, former Member of the European Parliament
- Lee Towers (born 1946), singer
- Gert Oostindie (born 1955), historian and professor
- Martin van Beek (1960–2018), politician, former senator
- Robbert Dijkgraaf FRSE (born 1960), mathematical physicist and politician, string theorist and minister
- Jos Wienen (born 1960), politician, former alderman of Ridderkerk, mayor of Haarlem
- Johan Schot CBE (born 1961), historian working on science and technology policy
- Cora van Nieuwenhuizen (born 1963), politician, former minister
- Flora Lagerwerf-Vergunst (born 1964), judge and politician, former senator
- Bart Jan Spruyt (born 1964), historian, journalist and conservative writer
- Liesbeth Zegveld (born 1970), lawyer, legal expert and professor
- André Flach (born 1976), politician

=== Sport ===
- Gerrit Lagendijk (1941–2010), professional football player and agent
- Wietske de Ruiter (born 1970), female former field hockey striker, team bronze medallist at the 1996 Summer Olympics
- Maurice Lim (born 1984), figure skating champion
- Jordy Buijs (born 1988), footballer, over 250 club caps
- Kevin Strootman (born 1990), footballer, nearly 300 club caps
- Bart Deurloo (born 1991), male artistic gymnast
- Tim Eekman (born 1991), professional footballer, almost 200 club caps
- Mick van Buren (born 1992), footballer, 150 club caps

== Gallery ==
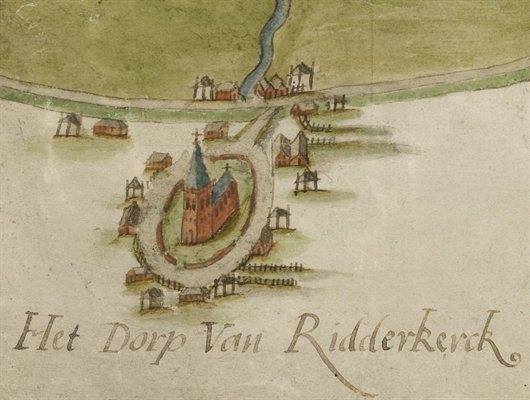
Ridderkerk in 1584

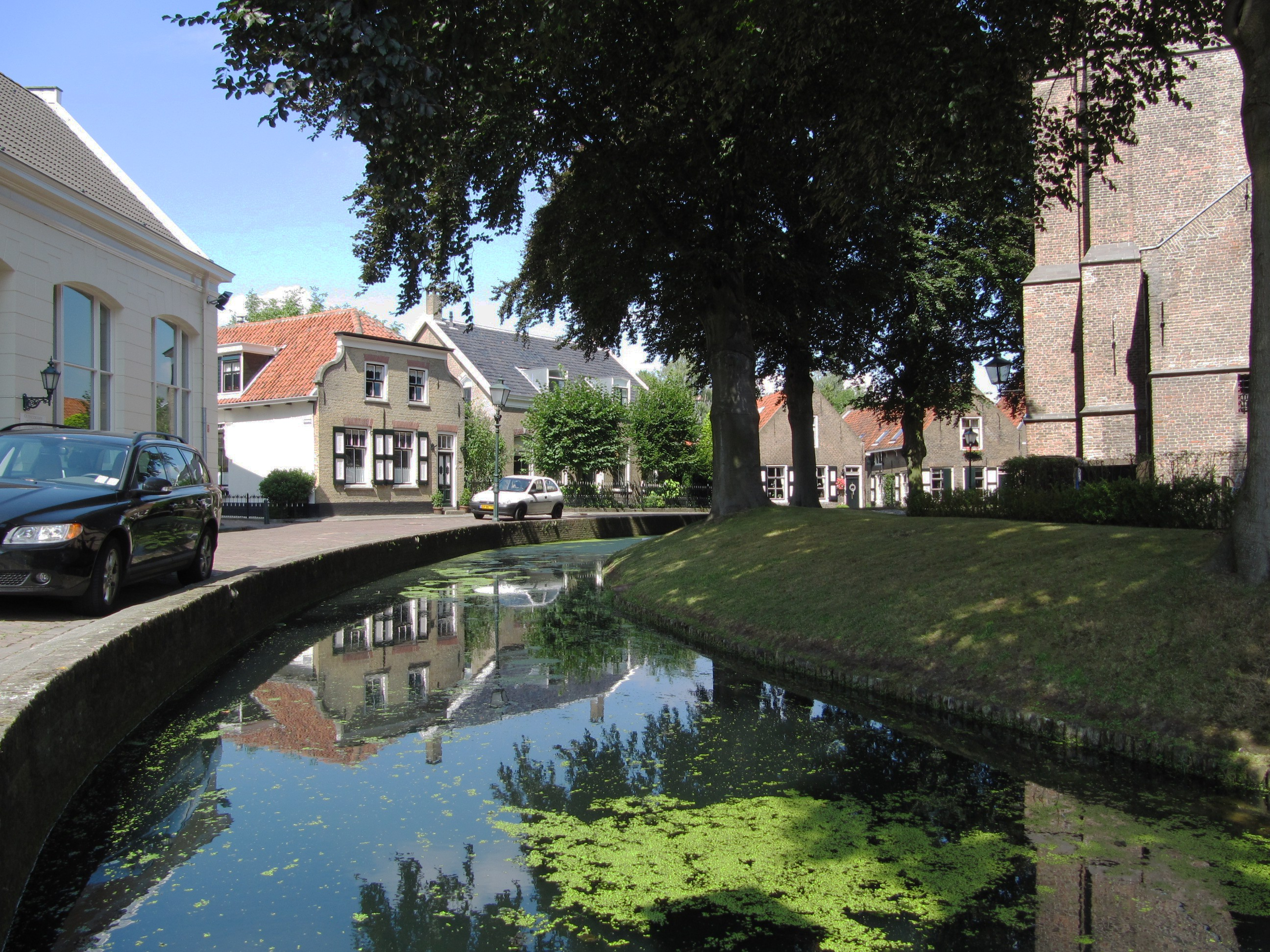
Ridderkerk Kerksingel

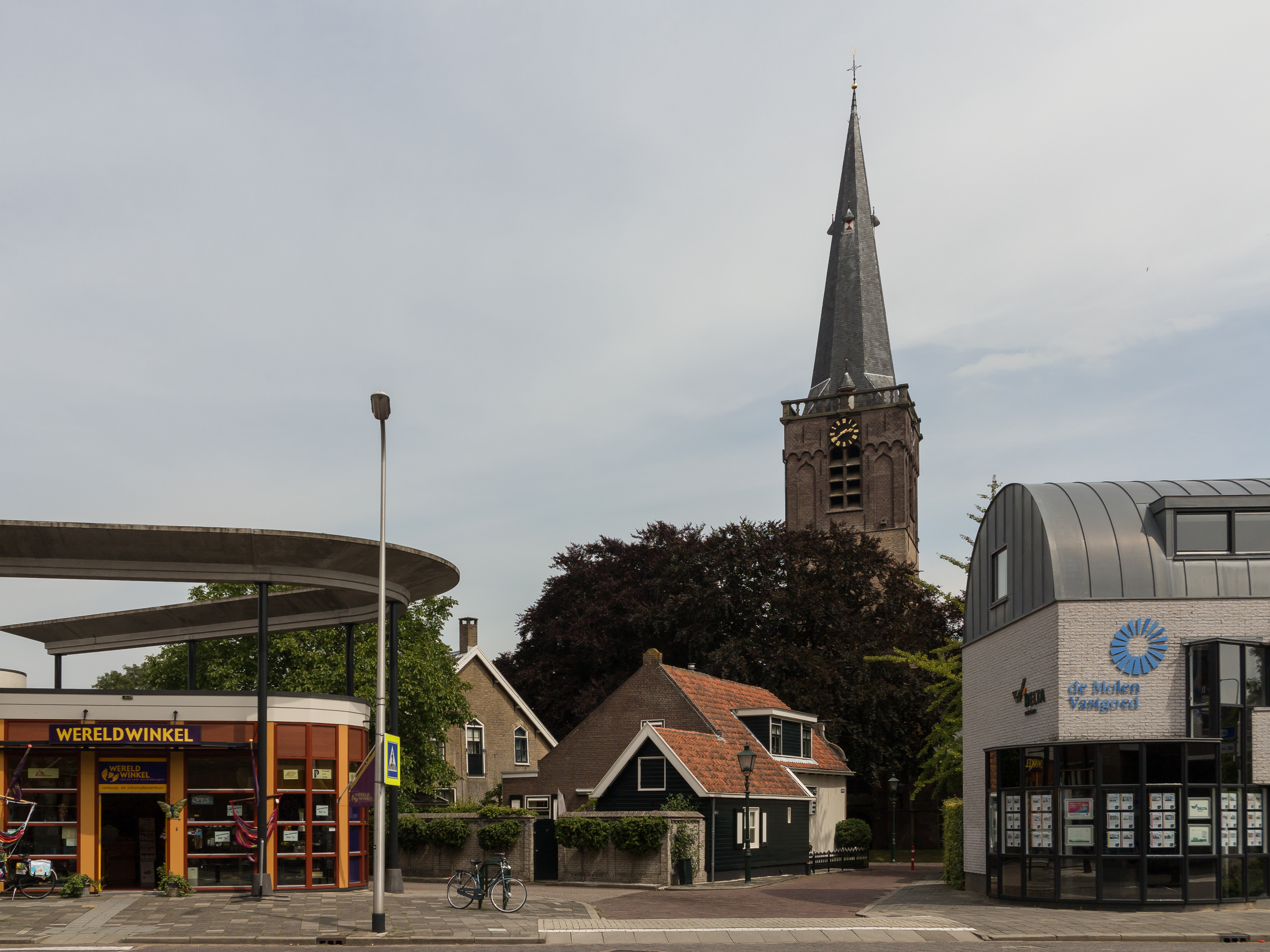
Ridderkerk, church: Singelkerk Sint Joris

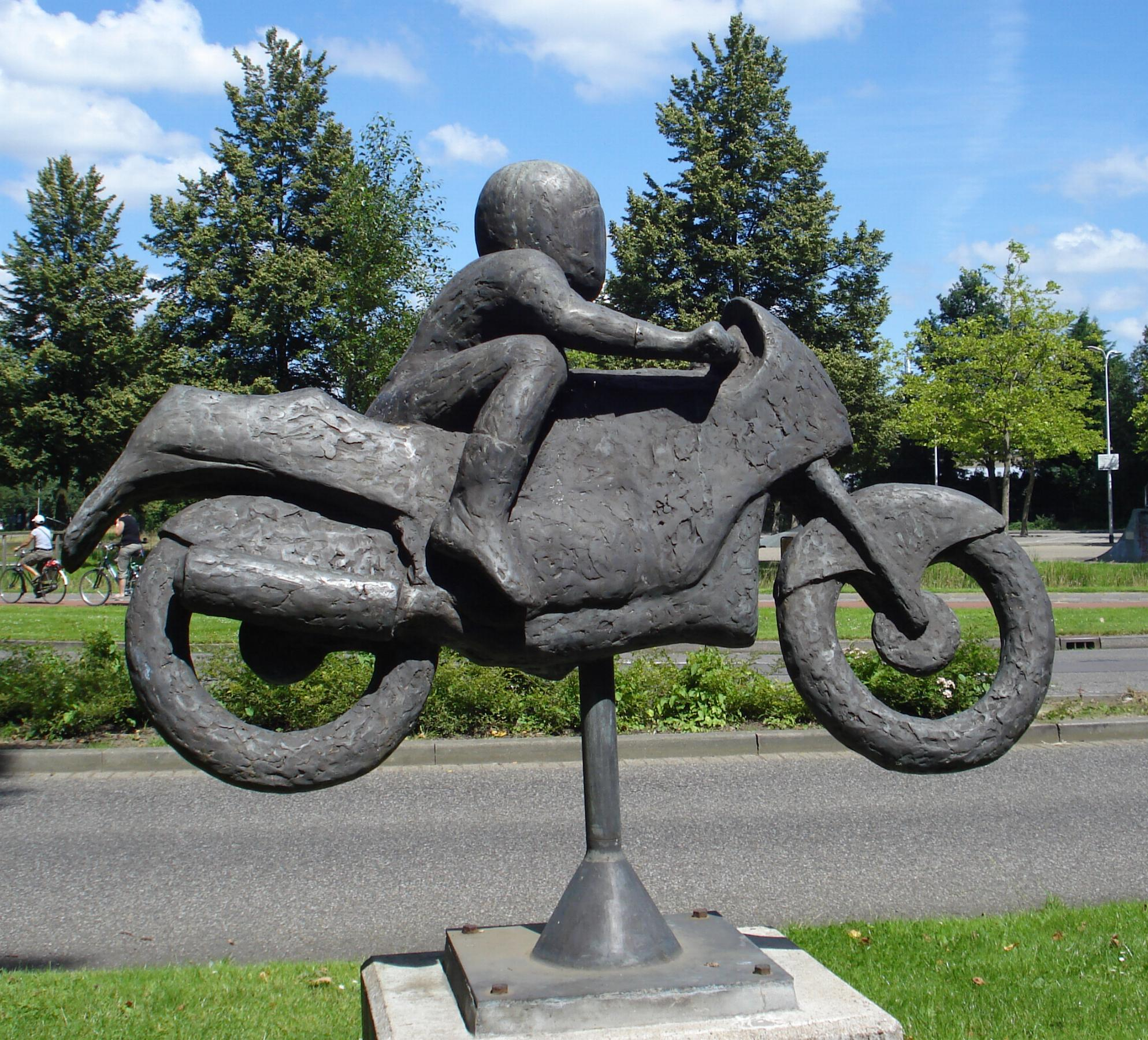
Ridderkerk kunstwerk motorrijder

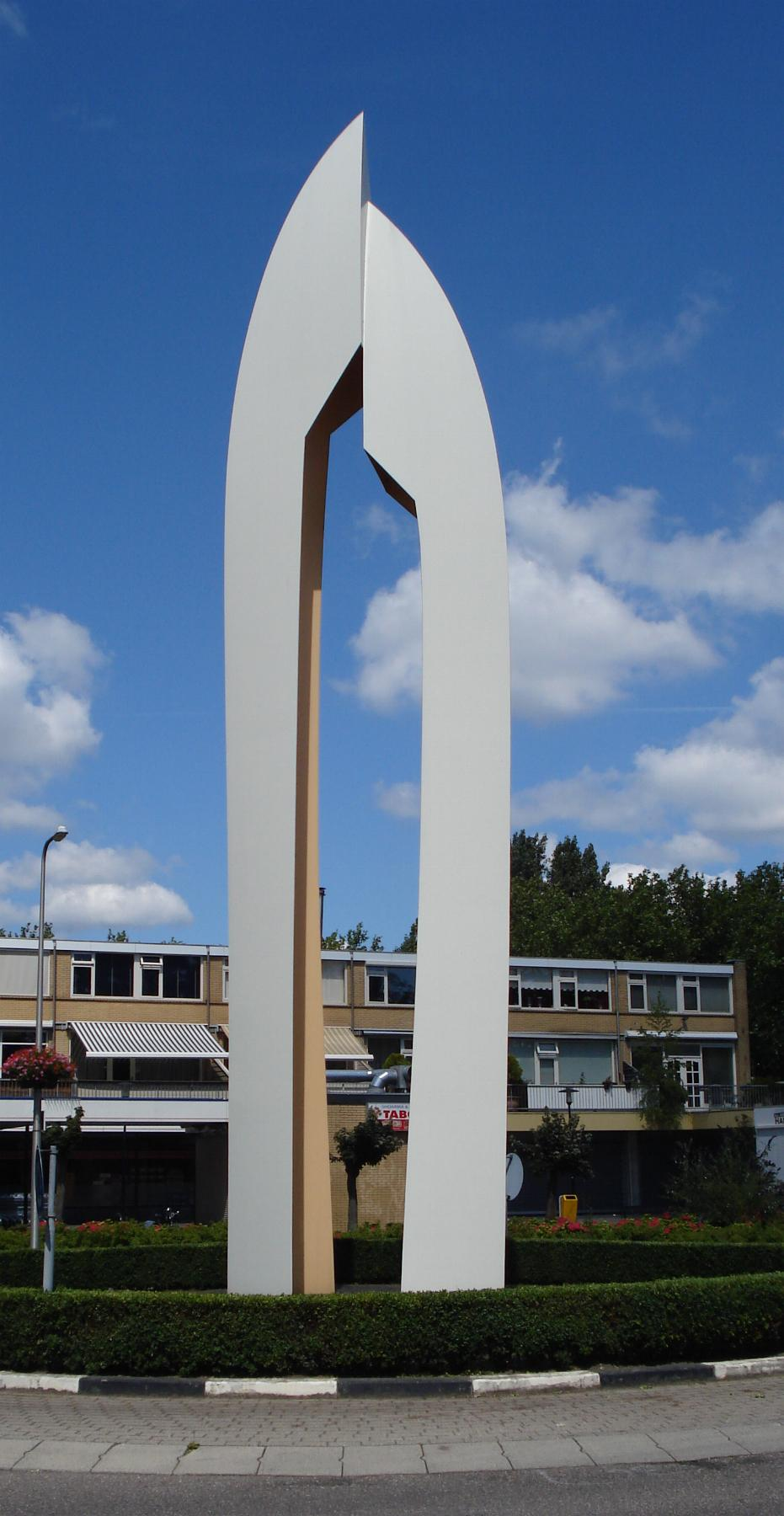
Ridderkerk kunstwerk ontmoetingspoort
