= Anna Akhmanova =

Russian cell biologist

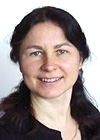
- Anna Akhmanova.
- Born: 11 May 1967 (age 59); Moscow, Russia
- Citizenship: The Netherlands, Russia
- Education: Moscow State University (masters), Radboud University Nijmegen (doctorate)
- Children: 1
- Awards: 2018 Spinoza Prize
- Scientific career
- Fields: Cell biology
- Workplaces: Radboud University Nijmegen, Erasmus University of Rotterdam, Utrecht University
- Doctoral advisor: Wolfgang Hennig
- Other academic advisors: Alexander Mankin
- Website: cellbiology.science.uu.nl/research-groups/anna-akhmanova-cellular-dynamics/

Anna Sergeevna Akhmanova (born 11 May 1967) is a Russian-born professor of Cell Biology at Utrecht University in the Netherlands. She is best known for her research regarding microtubules and the proteins, called TIPs, that stabilize one specific end of the tubules. Among the awards she has won, she was one of the recipients of the 2018 Spinoza Prize, the highest honor for Dutch scientists.

== Biography ==
Anna Akhmanova was born on 11 May 1967 in Moscow, Russia, to a family of scientists. Her grandmother was an English and linguistics professor, her father a physics professor, and her mother and now her brother hold PhDs in physics as well. She cites an interest in nature from an early age and that "a career in science was a very natural choice" for herself. She attended Moscow State University, where she studied biology in the country's then-standard five-year program to receive her masters. During this program she studied basic biology, along with cell biology and biochemistry. Her fifth-year research thesis was completed in Alexander Mankin's laboratory where she researched halophilic archaebacteria; she credits Mankin as the person from whom she learned most of her molecular biology knowledge. She received her master's degree in 1989.

After graduating from Moscow State, Akhmanova left Russia to continue her studies in the Netherlands. She had originally looked for doctorate programs in Russia, but however, "the salaries were very low, there was absolutely no funding to do research, and the country as a whole was experiencing problems." During this time, the Soviet policy of perestroika was negatively affecting the university and research programs there, which led to Akhmanova's decision to go to the Netherlands with her young daughter to obtain her PhD. There, she worked at Radboud University Nijmegen (RU) in a lab under Wolfgang Hennig; her research then focused on obtaining mutants of histone genes. She received her PhD in 1997 from RU.

She completed two postdoctoral projects, the first of which was at RU, where she worked with anaerobic organisms for the Department of Microbiology. Her second postdoc was done at the Erasmus University of Rotterdam. She worked in Niels Galjart's lab in the Department of Cell Biology which Frank Grosveld headed; her research focused on gene regulation and transcription. She worked with one transcription factor using two-hybrid screening and was asked by Casper Hoogenraad for help with screening CLIP-115, a microtubule-binding protein that Hoogenraad was working with. Akhmanova and Hoogenraad then created clones for the proteins CLASP and Bicaudal-D, which Akhmanova describes as the proteins that defined her career.

In 2011, Akhmanova and Hoogenraad continued to collaborate on research and moved their laboratories to Utrecht University, where they began running the Division of Cell Biology. As of 2023, she is still a cell biology professor at Utrecht University, where she continues to do research on intracellular transportation, especially involving microtubule proteins.

== Research ==
Akhmanova and her team study the cell cytoskeleton and its effect on human diseases, cell polarization, and vertebrate development. Their main focus is on the microtubules that form part of the cytoskeleton and are essential for many processes, especially cell division. Their research is important for battling disease processes such as cancer, neurodegeneration, and the spread of pathogens throughout the cell.

In terms of methods, the team uses high resolution images of the cells they are studying. They utilize specific assays to measure protein dynamics, reconstitute cytoskeleton processes in vitro, and identify the interactions of different proteins.

The team studies specific proteins that interact on the plus and minus ends of the microtubules, specifically the plus end tracking proteins (+TIPs), which associate with the plus end of the microtubule to regulate its dynamics, and how the +TIPs interact with other structures in the cell. More recently, they have started researching "the biochemical properties and functional roles of the proteins" which organize minus end tracking proteins (-TIPs).^{4} There is far less information about –TIPs, and they are still not fully understood; however, recent research on CAMSAP, a type of –TIP, has shown that it plays an important role for organizing and stabilizing microtubules during interphase. Akhmanova's group now focus on finding how CAMSAP contributes to the organization and stabilization of non-centrosomal microtubules during cell division.

Another of their projects concerns the mechanisms involved in microtubule-based vesicle transport. They identified several structures that link the microtubule motors, kinesin and dynein, to vesicles, and they developed procedures to show the function of the linkers when gathering motor proteins to associate with membrane organelles. Inside the cell, kinesin and dynein protein motors are required for long-range transport along microtubules. Akhmanova's team focuses mainly on dynein, the motor that moves toward the minus end of the microtubule, and how it is linked to the various organelles and vesicles it transfers. They also study how dynein coordinates with kinesin, the motor that moves toward the plus end of the microtubule, when they are attached to the same organelle or vesicle, and they study the different signaling pathways that affect these motors. As of 2016, they were examining the protein Bicaudal D and its role in dynein-dependent transport, as it has been found to be important for dynein-dependent transport of mRNA in flies and of exocytotic vesicles in mammals. Bicaudal D was also found to be important for the positioning of the centrosomes and nucleus during mitosis, as the positioning is facilitated by dynein and kinesin.

Akhmanova and her team use constitutive exocytosis as a model system for their study of kinesin and dynein. Exocytotic carriers move from the Golgi to the plasma membrane along microtubules. The team has found that the same cortical complexes are used to attach the microtubule to the plasma membrane as are used to attach them to vesicles. From here, the team plans to study how the cortical complexes are made and regulated, how they affect the attachments and dynamics of microtubules, and what the mechanism is that allows them to fuse vesicles. Also, they would like to find more information on the NF-κB signaling pathway as it was found to have proteins, called ELKS, which are found in the cortical complex. They plan to research how the pathway's components interact and how it affects microtubule stabilization and vesicle fusion.

== Honours and awards ==
Akhmanova has received several awards, including the NWO Spinoza Prize in 2018, the ALW Vernieuwingsimpuls VIDI award in 2001, and the VICI award in 2007. In 2013, she and her colleague Marileen Dogterom received a European Research Council Synergy grant of 7.1 million euro. The grant was given for research on cell division and cell movement.

Akhmanova is a member of the European Molecular Biology Organization (2010) and the Royal Netherlands Academy of Arts and Sciences (2015), and she is the chair of the board for the Netherlands Society for Microscopy. She is also on the editorial board for various publications such as eLife, Journal of Cell Science, BMC Cell Biology, The Journal of Biological Chemistry, Traffic, and BioArchitecture.

Listed are some of her awards:

- 2001 – VIDI award, ALW Vernieuwingsimpuls
- 2007 – VICI award, ALW Vernieuwingsimpuls
- 2014 – Synergy grant, European Research Council
- 2018 – Spinoza Prize, Netherlands Organisation for Scientific Research
