= Detroit Cougars (soccer) =

Former American soccer team

- Full name: Detroit Cougars
- Founded: 1967
- Dissolved: 1968; 58 years ago
- Stadium: Tiger Stadium; University of Detroit Stadium both in Detroit, Michigan
- Owner(s): William Clay Ford, John Fetzer, others
- Head coach: John Colrain (1967); Len Julians, Andre Nagy (1968)
- League: USA (1967); NASL (1968)
- 1968: 4th (last), Lakes Division
Home colors	Away colors

The Detroit Cougars were an American professional soccer team based out of Detroit, Michigan that was a charter member of the United Soccer Association (USA) in 1967. When the USA and rival National Professional Soccer League (NPSL) merged in 1968 to form the North American Soccer League (NASL), the team moved to the new league. The Cougars played its home matches at the University of Detroit Stadium for the 1967 USA season and at Tiger Stadium for the 1968 NASL season, except when scheduling conflicts with the Detroit Tigers forced the team to play at the University of Detroit Stadium. The team folded at the conclusion of the 1968 NASL season.

== History ==
=== Origins ===
In 1966 several groups of entrepreneurs were exploring the idea of forming a professional soccer league in United States. One of these groups, United Soccer Association (USA) led by Jack Kent Cooke, selected 12 cities for team locations and a group headed by William Clay Ford, owner of the Detroit Lions, and John Fetzer, owner of the Detroit Tigers, were selected to run the Detroit franchise. The USA originally planned to start play in the spring of 1968; however the rival National Professional Soccer League, which secured a TV contract from CBS, announced it was ready to launch in 1967. Not wanting to let the rival league gain an advantage, the USA decided to launch early. Not having secured any player contracts, the league imported teams from Europe, Brazil, and Uruguay to represent the franchise cities. Northern Irish team Glentoran F.C. was brought over to play as the Cougars with player-coach John Colrain hired to act in the same capacity with the team. Prior to the season, the organization announced that Millwall F.C. center forward player-coach Len Julians was signed to coach the team for the 1968 season.

=== United Soccer Association 1967 ===
The Cougars opened the season on May 27, 1967, against the Boston Shamrock Rovers (Note: The League of Ireland's Shamrock Rovers F.C. were imported to play as the Boston Shamrock Rovers) in Lynn, Massachusetts, with the match ending in a 1–1 draw. The team's first home match at the University of Detroit Stadium on June 4, 1967, against the Vancouver Royal Canadians (Note: English professional soccer Sunderland A.F.C. were imported to play as the Vancouver Royal Canadians) drew 11,629 spectators and also ended in a 1–1 draw. The team's match on June 14, 1967, against the Houston Stars, represented by Brazilian team Bangu Atlético Clube, ended 17 minutes before the end of regulation with the Stars winning 2–0 when Houston fullback Luiz Alberto kicked Tommy Jackson in the kidney and police were needed to restore order on the pitch. In late June 1967, Colrain announced he had sidelined himself for the season and would only continue in his capacity as head coach. The Cougars finished the 1967 season in third place of the Eastern Division with a record of 3 wins 6 ties and 3 losses and an average attendance of 5,708.

=== North American Soccer League 1968 ===
With the merger of the United Soccer Association and the National Professional Soccer League it was announced that Detroit would be one of the 20-teams team play in the North American Soccer League (NASL). (Note: 17 teams contested the 1968 NASL season with three teams folding before the season began) Walter Bruce who had been part of the 1967 USA team returned to play for Detroit after helping of Glentoran F.C. win the 1967–68 Irish League title. Prior to the beginning of the season, the Cougars made a tour of the Caribbean, playing friendlies against local teams in Kingston, Jamaica and in Port-au-Prince, Haiti against Cavalier F.C., Violette AC, and Racing CH winning eight games and losing only one. Following the tour, the team signed three Haiti international players Edner Breton, Claude Barthélemy, and Jean-Claude Désir.

The Cougars began the season on the road, with matches against the Atlanta Chiefs on March 30, 1968, and Kansas City Spurs on April 10, 1968, before their first home game against the Vancouver Royals held at the University of Detroit Stadium due to scheduling conflicts with the Detroit Tigers. On August 17, 1968, with the team in last place, Julians resigned and the team named Andre Nagy as the new coach. The Cougars ended the season in last place of the Lakes Division with a record of six wins, four draws and twenty-one losses and averaging 4,266 fans in attendance. Reporting losses of over $1 million during its two seasons of play, the organization folded on September 23, 1968, the first of 12 NASL teams to fold between the 1968 and 1969 seasons.

=== Legacy ===
To commemorate the 50th anniversary of Glentoran F.C.'s representing Detroit in the United Soccer Association, local semi-pro side Detroit City FC announced that it would host Glentoran at Keyworth Stadium for an international friendly; City beat the Northern Irish visitors, 1–0.

== Year-by-year ==
Year	League	W	L	T	Pts	Regular season	Playoffs
1967	USA	3	3	6	12	4th, Eastern Division	did not qualify
1968	NASL	6	21	4	88	4th, Lakes Division	did not qualify
