= Ad Lagendijk =

Dutch physicist (born 1947)

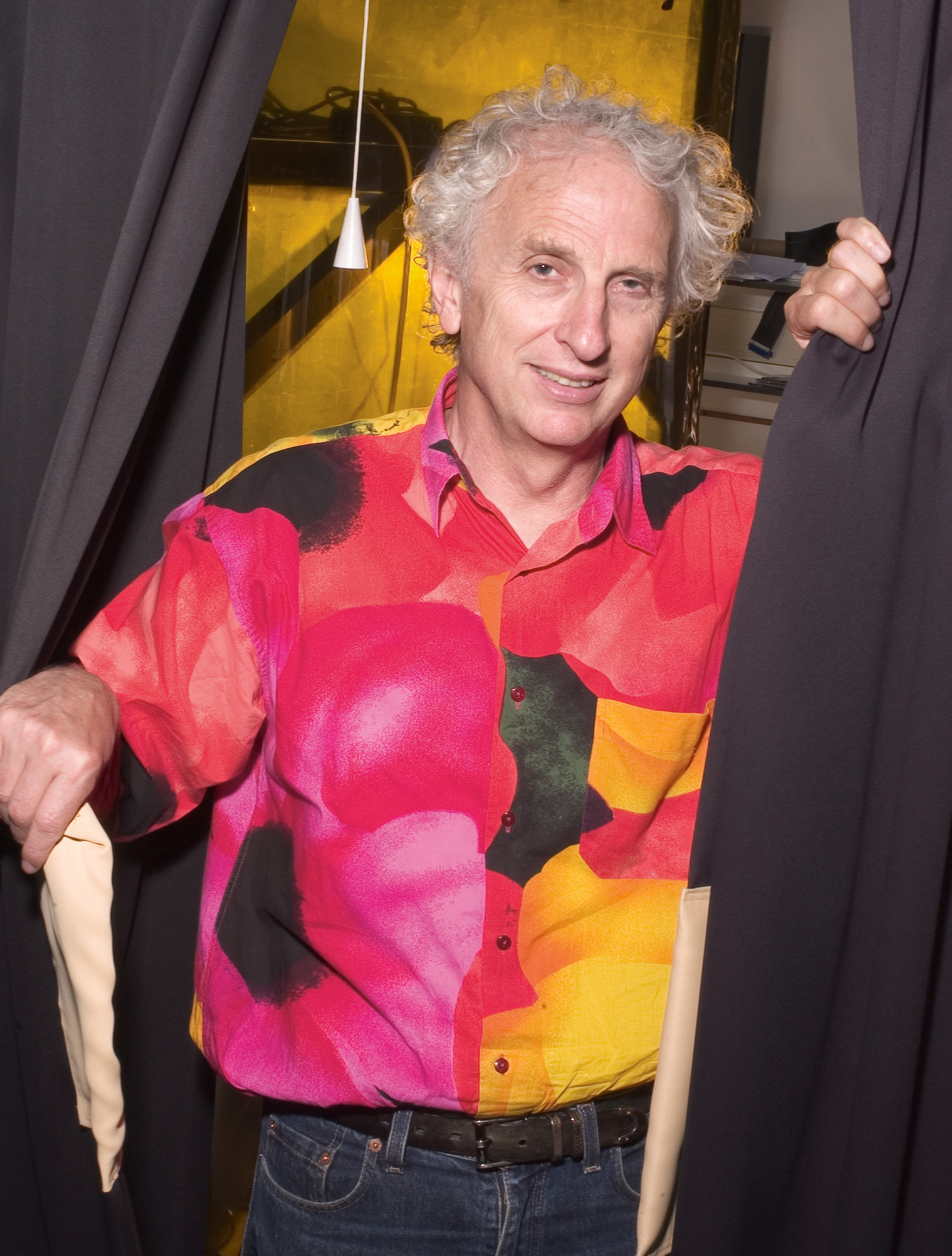
Ad Lagendijk (2002)

Ad Lagendijk (born 18 November 1947 in Zwanenburg) is a Dutch physicist working at the FOM-institute AMOLF in Amsterdam and at the University of Amsterdam. He is also a part-time professor at the University of Twente in Enschede, Netherlands.

== Research ==
Ad Lagendijk is a physicist with a background in physical chemistry. Lagendijk studies the propagation of light in complex matter, especially materials that strongly scatter light. He has a large international impact in this field with a few hundred scientific publications.

== Short biography ==
Ad Lagendijk received his Ph.D. from the University of Amsterdam in 1974. From 1974 to 1981 he worked at the University of Antwerp, Belgium. From 1981 he worked at the University of Amsterdam where he holds a professorship in physics since 1984. In 1987 he also became a department head at the FOM-institute AMOLF. In 1998 he was elected member of the Royal Netherlands Academy of Arts and Sciences. In 2002 Lagendijk and his research group moved to the University of Twente in Enschede. In 2005 he moved back to the FOM-Institute AMOLF with a part of his group, to found the Photon Scattering Group.

Lagendijk gained fame outside physics as the author of columns in a national newspaper and as the author of the Survival Guide for Scientists, a book with advice in the areas of communication and presentation, intended for junior scientists. He actively blogs in Dutch and English.

Professor Ad Lagendijk received the Spinoza Prize of 2002 for his research on the propagation of light in strongly scattering media, a field that according to the jury, he defined himself and brought to maturity both experimentally and theoretically through his research.

== Sources ==
- Ad Lagendijk's homepage
- Spinoza 2002
- Jury report Spinoza Prize 2002
- Survival Blog for Scientists
- Interferentie Blog (Dutch)
