= Vancouver Royals =

Defunct Canadian soccer club

Vancouver Royal Canadians
- Full name: Vancouver Royal Canadians
- Nickname: Royals
- Founded: 1967; 59 years ago
- Dissolved: 1968; 58 years ago
- Stadium: Empire Stadium
- Capacity: 32,729
- Owners: Brig. General E.G. Eakins, George Fleharty
- League: North American Soccer League
- 1968: West Division: 4th Playoffs: Did not qualify
Home colours	Away colours

The Vancouver Royals were a Canadian professional soccer team based in Vancouver, British Columbia, Canada. Founded in 1967 as the Vancouver Royal Canadians, they were a charter member of the United Soccer Association (USA), and when the US and rival National Professional Soccer League (NPSL) merged in 1968 to form the North American Soccer League (NASL), the team, rebranded as the Royals, moved to the new league. The Royals played its home matches at the Empire Stadium. The team folded at the conclusion of the 1968 NASL season.

== History ==
In 1966 several groups of entrepreneurs were exploring the idea of forming a professional soccer league in United States. One of these groups, United Soccer Association (USA) led by Jack Kent Cooke, selected 12 cities for team locations with Vancouver franchise purchased by Brigadier General E.G. Eakins. The USA originally planned to start play in the spring of 1968; however the rival National Professional Soccer League, which secured a TV contract from CBS, announced it was ready to launch in 1967. Not wanting to let the rival league gain an advantage, the USA decided to launch early. Not having secured any player contracts, the league imported teams from Europe, Brazil, and Uruguay to represent the franchise cities. English team Sunderland A.F.C. was brought in to play as the Royal Canadians.

The Royals opened the 1967 season away against the San Francisco Golden Gate Gales (Note: The Dutch team ADO Den Haag had been brought over to represent San Francisco) with a 6–1 loss on May 28, but won their home opener against the Dallas Tornado (Note: Dallas was represented by Scottish tean Dundee United F.C.) 4–1 on June 7. The Royals finished the season in fifth place with a record of 3 wins, 5 ties and 4 losses while drawing an average home league attendance of 7,019.

Following the 1967 season, the USA merged with the National Professional Soccer League to form the North American Soccer League. As part of the new league's efforts to consolidate teams and cities, the owner of the San Francisco Golden Gate Gales franchise, George Fleharty, yielded the San Francisco Bay Area to the NPSL Oakland Clippers and bought a controlling interest in the Vancouver Royal Canadians, renaming the team Vancouver Royals. Bobby Robson was originally reported to have been named manager of the new merged team which was to include players both the Royals and Gales organizations had signed between the end of the 1967 season and merger. However, Ferenc Puskás who had been hired to manage the San Francisco franchise was later named by the owner as head coach. Robson, who took over as coach of Fulham F.C. in January 1968, later sued the team for breach of contract.

The Royals finished the 1968 NASL season in last place in the Pacific Division with 12 wins 5 ties and 15 losses. The team averaged a home attendance of 6,197. The Royals were one of 12 teams that folded between the 1968 and 1969 NASL seasons.

== Coaches ==
- (Scotland) Ian McColl (1967)
- (Hungary) (Spain) Ferenc Puskás, Head Coach (1967)- Bob Lenarduzzi witnessed Puskas coaching Royals in '67 not '68.
- (Hungary) Joe Csabai, Assistant Coach (1968)

== Year-by-year ==
League season	Team season	Regular season								Position		Playoffs	Domestic Cup	Top Scorer	
League season	Team season	League	P	W	L	D	GF	GA	Pts	Div.	Overall	Playoffs	Domestic Cup	Player	Goals
1967	1967	USA	12	3	5	4	20	28	11	5th	9th	out of playoffs	—	(Scotland) George Herd	3
1968	1968	NASL	32	12	15	5	51	60	136	4th	13th	out of playoffs	—	(Luxembourg) Henry Klein	20

Note: Only regular season goals counted

== See also ==
- 1967 Vancouver Royal Canadians season
- 1968 Vancouver Royals season
- Vancouver Whitecaps
