= Straw dog (disambiguation) =

A straw dog is a ceremonial object in ancient China.

Straw dog or Straw Dogs may also refer to:

- Straw dog, a harvest ceremonial object from northern Britain
- A variant of the expression "straw man"
  - Most often encountered in business and engineering circles instead of straw man proposal

== Films and books ==
- The Siege of Trencher's Farm, a 1969 novel by Gordon Williams that inspired the film adaptations titled Straw Dogs
  - Straw Dogs (1971 film), a psychological thriller directed by Sam Peckinpah
  - Straw Dogs (2011 film), a remake of the 1971 film
- Straw Dogs: Thoughts on Humans and Other Animals, a 2003 book on philosophy by John Gray

== Music ==
- Straw Dogs (band), an American country rock band
- The F.U.'s, previously Straw Dogs, a 1980s American hardcore punk and heavy metal band
- "Straw Dogs", a song by The Meads of Asphodel from Life Is Shit ( A cover of Stiff Little Fingers song)
- "Straw Dogs", a song by Stiff Little Fingers
- "Straw Dog", a song by Something Corporate from Leaving Through the Window
