= 1964–65 Chelsea F.C. season =

English football club season

Chelsea
1964-65 season
- Chairman: Joe Mears
- Manager: Tommy Docherty
- First Division: 3rd
- FA Cup: Semi-finals
- Football League Cup: Winners
- Top goalscorer: League: Barry Bridges (20); All: Barry Bridges (27)
- Highest home attendance: 61,277 vs Liverpool (16 April 1965)
- Lowest home attendance: 20,952 vs Wolverhampton Wanderers (12 December 1964)
Home colours	Away colours	Third colours

The 1964-65 season was Chelsea Football Club's 51st of competitive football, and their 38th in the English top flight.

== Season summary ==
Chelsea were involved in a battle for the First Division championship with Manchester United and newly promoted Leeds United. The three clubs also reached the semi-finals of the FA Cup, with the two Uniteds paired together while Chelsea faced off against reigning league champions Liverpool. A 2–0 defeat at Villa Park saw Chelsea's hopes of a league and cup 'double' evaporate, and their title hopes then nosedived with only two wins from the remaining eight league matches.

The season ended in controversy and ignominy after eight Chelsea players were alleged by manager Tommy Docherty to have broken a curfew imposed prior to their penultimate match, resulting in those responsible being sent back to London in disgrace. The Blues' heavily weakened side were thrashed 6–2 by Burnley, and defeat to Blackpool in their final match meant Chelsea had to settle for a third-place finish, five points behind the top two.

However, some consolation was gained from success in the nascent Football League Cup. Chelsea overcame Birmingham City, Notts County, Swansea Town, Workington and Aston Villa, before beating Leicester City 3–2 on aggregate in the final to claim the first domestic cup title in the club's history.

== Results ==
=== First Division ===
22 August 1964 1	Wolverhampton Wanderers	0–3	Chelsea	Wolverhampton
			Tambling 4', 77'; Venables 16'	Stadium: Molineux; Attendance: 25,181

26 August 1964 2	Chelsea	2–1	Aston Villa	London
	Tambling 5'; Bridges 55'		Hateley 61'	Stadium: Stamford Bridge; Attendance: 30,389

29 August 1964 3	Chelsea	3–1	Sunderland	London
	Murray 10'; Graham 49'; Shellito 54'		Herd 87'	Stadium: Stamford Bridge; Attendance: 46,710

31 August 1964 4	Aston Villa	2–2	Chelsea	Birmingham
	Hateley 84'; Wylie 87'		Murray 36'; Tambling 51'	Stadium: Villa Park; Attendance: 19,740

5 September 1964 5	Leicester City	1–1	Chelsea	Leicester
	Appleton 18'		Hollins 54'	Stadium: Filbert Street; Attendance: 22,186

9 September 1964 6	Chelsea	1–1	Sheffield Wednesday	London
	Venables 47' (pen.)		Pearson 43'	Stadium: Stamford Bridge; Attendance: 31,973

12 September 1964 7	Chelsea	1–0	Fulham	London
	Bridges 30'			Stadium: Stamford Bridge; Attendance: 41,472

16 September 1964 8	Sheffield Wednesday	2–3	Chelsea	Sheffield
	Dobson 3'; Fantham 57'		Graham 30'; Murray 71', 76'	Stadium: Hillsborough; Attendance: 18,176

19 September 1964 9	Chelsea	2–0	Leeds United	London
	Venables 35'; Hollins 76'			Stadium: Stamford Bridge; Attendance: 38,006

26 September 1964 10	Arsenal	1–3	Chelsea	London
	Court 68'		Tambling 57'; Venables 65'; Murray 88'	Stadium: Highbury; Attendance: 54,936

30 September 1964 11	Chelsea	0–2	Manchester United	London
			Best 32'; Law 73'	Stadium: Stamford Bridge; Attendance: 60,769

3 October 1964 12	Chelsea	5–1	Blackburn Rovers	London
	Bridges 15', 17', 71'; Tambling 51'; R. Harris 76'		McEvoy 88'	Stadium: Stamford Bridge; Attendance: 34,913

10 October 1964 13	Nottingham Forest	2–2	Chelsea	Nottingham
	Crowe 22', 44'		Bridges 30'; Venables 86'	Stadium: City Ground; Attendance: 35,320

17 October 1964 14	Chelsea	4–0	Stoke City	London
	Graham 49', 86'; Murray 61'; Tambling 68'			Stadium: Stamford Bridge; Attendance: 28,650

24 October 1964 15	Tottenham Hotspur	1–1	Chelsea	London
	Jones 81'		Graham 82'	Stadium: White Hart Lane; Attendance: 52,927

31 October 1964 16	Chelsea	0–1	Burnley	London
			Irvine 53'	Stadium: Stamford Bridge; Attendance: 29,040

7 November 1964 17	Sheffield United	0–2	Chelsea	Sheffield
			Murray 9'; Bridges 80'	Stadium: Bramall Lane; Attendance: 23,505

14 November 1964 18	Chelsea	5–1	Everton	London
	Graham 9', 16'; Bridges 18'; Murray 78'; Tambling 82'		Gabriel 44'	Stadium: Stamford Bridge; Attendance: 30,716

21 November 1964 19	Birmingham City	1–6	Chelsea	Birmingham
	Jackson 60'		Mortimore 6'; Graham 8', 80', 90'; McCalliog 29', 85'	Stadium: St Andrew's; Attendance: 19,803

28 November 1964 20	Chelsea	0–3	West Ham United	London
			Sealey 7'; Peters 24'; Hurst 38'	Stadium: Stamford Bridge; Attendance: 44,204

5 December 1964 21	West Bromwich Albion	0–2	Chelsea	West Bromwich
			Bridges 70'; Graham 78'	Stadium: The Hawthorns; Attendance: 15,277

12 December 1964 22	Chelsea	2–1	Wolverhampton Wanderers	London
	Bridges 45', 49'		Crawford 19'	Stadium: Stamford Bridge; Attendance: 20,952

19 December 1964 23	Sunderland	3–0	Chelsea	Sunderland
	Sharkey 22'; Harvey 31'; Herd 82'			Stadium: Roker Park; Attendance: 41,236

26 December 1964 24	Chelsea	2–0	Blackpool	London
	Bridges 61', 64'			Stadium: Stamford Bridge; Attendance: 30,581

2 January 1965 25	Chelsea	4–1	Leicester City	London
	Murray 40'; Graham 43'; McCreadie 63'; Bridges 86'		Stringfellow 54'	Stadium: Stamford Bridge; Attendance: 28,344

16 January 1965 26	Fulham	1–2	Chelsea	London
	Cook 86'		Tambling 14'; Graham 68'	Stadium: Craven Cottage; Attendance: 26,400

23 January 1965 27	Leeds United	2–2	Chelsea	Leeds
	Storrie 16'; Charlton 52'		Graham 2'; Bridges 50'	Stadium: Elland Road; Attendance: 47,109

6 February 1965 28	Chelsea	2–1	Arsenal	London
	Graham 13', 85'		Radford 59'	Stadium: Stamford Bridge; Attendance: 46,798

13 February 1965 29	Blackburn Rovers	0–3	Chelsea	Blackburn
			Tambling 44'; Murray 55'; Bridges 77'	Stadium: Ewood Park; Attendance: 16,683

6 February 1965 30	Chelsea	0–1	Nottingham Forest	London
			Barnwell 35'	Stadium: Stamford Bridge; Attendance: 29,038

22 February 1965 31	Stoke City	0–2	Chelsea	Stoke-on-Trent
			Murray 10'; Graham 80'	Stadium: Victoria Ground; Attendance: 28,005

10 March 1965 32	Chelsea	3–1	Tottenham Hotspur	London
	Venables 42'; Tambling 44'; Bridges 73'		Gilzean 75'	Stadium: Stamford Bridge; Attendance: 51,390

13 March 1965 33	Manchester United	4–0	Chelsea	Manchester
	Best 3'; Herd 23', 49'; Law 75'			Stadium: Old Trafford; Attendance: 56,261

22 March 1965 34	Chelsea	3–0	Sheffield United	London
	Murray 27', 80'; Bridges 52'			Stadium: Stamford Bridge; Attendance: 31,837

31 March 1965 35	Everton	1–1	Chelsea	Liverpool
	Gabriel 4'		Murray 14'	Stadium: Goodison Park; Attendance: 40,384

3 April 1965 36	Chelsea	3–1	Birmingham City	London
	Tambling 15'; Lynn 68' (o.g.); Bridges 84'		Lynn 25' (pen.)	Stadium: Stamford Bridge; Attendance: 28,975

12 April 1965 37	West Ham United	3–2	Chelsea	London
	Hurst 4', 23'; Sissons 19'		Venables 53'; Bridges 65'	Stadium: Upton Park; Attendance: 33,288

16 April 1965 38	Chelsea	4–0	Liverpool	London
	Tambling 22'; Hinton 37'; Murray 50', 60'			Stadium: Stamford Bridge; Attendance: 62,587

17 April 1965 39	Chelsea	2–2	West Bromwich Albion	London
	Murray 21'; Tambling 23'		Crawford 15'; Howshall 42'	Stadium: Stamford Bridge; Attendance: 30,792

19 April 1965 40	Liverpool	2–0	Chelsea	Liverpool
	Chisnall 8'; Strong 26'			Stadium: Anfield; Attendance: 41,847

24 April 1965 41	Burnley	6–2	Chelsea	Burnley
	Lochhead 1', 16', 45', 66', 88'; Irvine 19'		R. Harris 31'; Houseman 86'	Stadium: Turf Moor; Attendance: 15,215

26 April 1965 42	Blackpool	3–2	Chelsea	Blackpool
	Charnley 9', 44', 51'		Tambling 40'; Mortimore 80'	Stadium: Bloomfield Road; Attendance: 16,008

Pos	Team	Pld	W	D	L	GF	GA	GAv	Pts	Qualification or relegation
1	Manchester United (C)	42	26	9	7	89	39	2.282	61	Qualification for the European Cup preliminary round
2	Leeds United	42	26	9	7	83	52	1.596	61	Qualification for the Inter-Cities Fairs Cup first round
3	Chelsea	42	24	8	10	89	54	1.648	56	Qualification for the Inter-Cities Fairs Cup first round
4	Everton	42	17	15	10	69	60	1.150	49	Qualification for the Inter-Cities Fairs Cup first round
5	Nottingham Forest	42	17	13	12	71	67	1.060	47	

Source: World Football
Rules for classification: 1) Points; 2) Goal average; 3) Goals scored
(C) Champions

=== League Cup ===
23 September 1964 2nd Round	Birmingham City	0–3	Chelsea	Birmingham
			Graham 34'; Tambling 68', 90'	Stadium: St Andrew's; Attendance: 15,300

26 October 1964 3rd Round	Chelsea	4–0	Notts County	London
	McCalliog 17'; Tambling 56', 60'; A. Harris 74'			Stadium: Stamford Bridge; Attendance: 6596

11 November 1964 4th Round	Chelsea	3–2	Swansea Town	London
	Brown 13'; Graham 36', 78'		Todd 30'; Williams 52'	Stadium: Stamford Bridge; Attendance: 5979

25 November 1964 5th Round	Workington	2–2	Chelsea	Workington
	Carr 40'; Napier 53'		Bridges 12', 34'	Stadium: Borough Park; Attendance: 18,000

16 December 1964 5th Round Replay	Chelsea	2–0	Workington	London
	Osgood 82', 84'			Stadium: Stamford Bridge; Attendance: 7936

20 January 1965 Semi-Final 1st Leg	Aston Villa	2–3	Chelsea	Birmingham
	Hateley 58', 82'		Tambling 35'; Bridges 45'; Boyle 83'	Stadium: Villa Park; Attendance: 12,022

10 February 1965 Semi-Final 2nd Leg	Chelsea	1–1	Aston Villa	London
	Graham 62'		Hateley 30'	Stadium: Stamford Bridge; Attendance: 17,425

15 March 1965 Final 1st Leg	Chelsea	3–2	Leicester City	London
	Tambling 34'; Venables 70' (pen.); McCreadie 81'		Appleton 46'; Goodfellow 75'	Stadium: Stamford Bridge; Attendance: 20,690

5 April 1965 Final 2nd Leg	Leicester City	0–0	Chelsea	Leicester
				Stadium: Filbert Street; Attendance: 26,957

=== FA Cup ===
9 January 1965 3rd Round	Chelsea	4–1	Northampton Town	London
	Tambling 44'; Bridges 55', 78'; Foley 57' (o.g.)		Foley 68' (pen.)	Stadium: Stamford Bridge; Attendance: 44,345

30 January 1965 4th Round	West Ham United	0–1	Chelsea	London
			Tambling 10'	Stadium: Upton Park; Attendance: 37,000

20 February 1965 5th Round	Chelsea	1–0	Tottenham Hotspur	London
	Bridges 17'			Stadium: Stamford Bridge; Attendance: 63,205

6 March 1965 6th Round	Chelsea	5–1	Peterborough United	London
	Tambling 11', 15'; Hollins 13'; Bridges 30'; Murray 88'		Crowe 41'	Stadium: Stamford Bridge; Attendance: 63,635

27 March 1965 Semi-Final	Liverpool	2–0	Chelsea	Birmingham
	Thompson 62'; Stevenson 78' (pen.)			Stadium: Villa Park; Attendance: 67,686

== Squad ==
Players who made one appearance or more for Chelsea F.C. during the 1964-65 season

Pos.	Nat.	Name	League		League Cup		FA Cup		Total	
Pos.	Nat.	Name	Apps	Goals	Apps	Goals	Apps	Goals	Apps	Goals
GK	ENG	Peter Bonetti	41	0	9	0	5	0	55	0
GK	ENG	John Dunn	1	0	0	0	0	0	1	0
DF	ENG	Allan Harris	1	0	2	1	0	0	3	1
DF	ENG	Ron Harris	42	2	6	0	5	0	53	2
DF	ENG	Marvin Hinton	40	1	6	0	5	0	51	1
DF	SCO	Eddie McCreadie	34	1	5	1	2	0	41	2
DF	ENG	John Mortimore	28	2	8	0	5	0	41	2
DF	ENG	Ken Shellito	13	1	1	0	0	0	14	1
DF	ENG	Frank Upton	3	0	4	0	1	0	8	0
DF	ENG	Ian Watson	2	0	3	0	0	0	5	0
DF	ENG	Allan Young	0	0	1	0	0	0	1	0
MF	SCO	John Boyle	6	0	4	1	2	0	12	1
MF	SCO	Joe Fascione	0	0	3	0	0	0	3	0
MF	SCO	George Graham	30	17	7	4	5	0	42	21
MF	ENG	John Hollins	41	2	6	0	5	1	52	3
MF	ENG	Peter Houseman	9	1	3	0	0	0	12	1
MF	SCO	Thomas Knox	13	0	1	0	0	0	14	0
MF	SCO	Jim McCalliog	3	2	5	1	0	0	8	3
MF	SCO	Billy Sinclair	1	0	0	0	0	0	1	0
MF	SCO	Jimmy Smart	1	0	0	0	0	0	1	0
MF	ENG	Terry Venables	39	7	5	1	5	0	49	8
FW	ENG	Barry Bridges	41	20	5	3	5	4	51	27
FW	ENG	Dennis Brown	0	0	1	1	0	0	1	1
FW	ENG	Bert Murray	40	17	6	0	5	1	51	18
FW	ENG	Peter Osgood	0	0	1	2	0	0	1	2
FW	ENG	Bobby Tambling	33	15	7	6	5	4	45	25
