= Terry Venables =

English football player and manager (1943–2023)

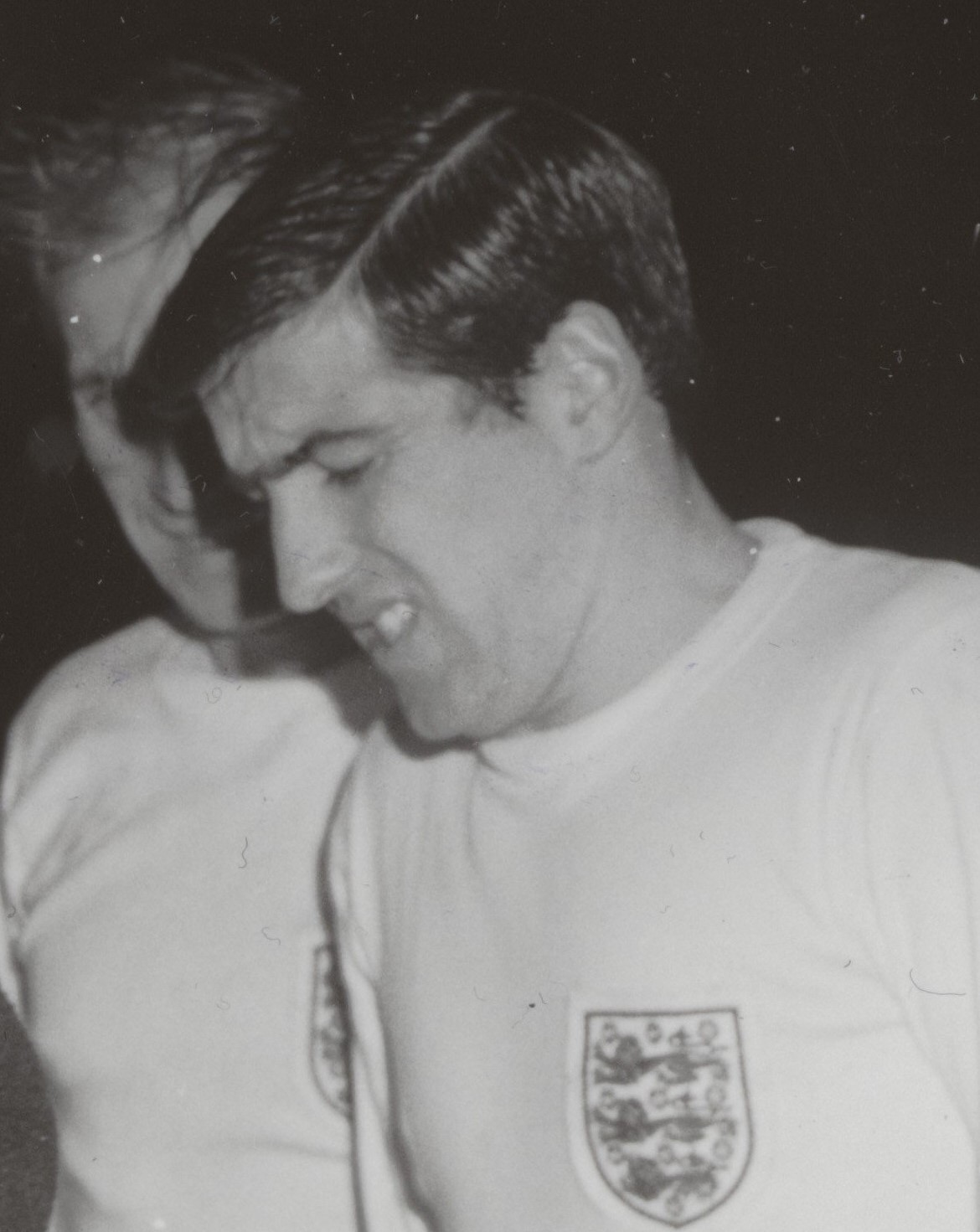
- Venables in 1964

Personal information
- Full name: Terence Frederick Venables
- Date of birth: 6 January 1943
- Place of birth: Dagenham, Essex, England
- Date of death: 25 November 2023 (aged 80)
- Height: 5 ft 8 in (1.73 m)
- Position: Midfielder

Youth career
- 1958–1960: Chelsea

Senior career*
Years	Team	Apps	(Gls)
1960–1966	Chelsea	202	(26)
1966–1969	Tottenham Hotspur	115	(5)
1969–1974	Queens Park Rangers	177	(19)
1974–1976	Crystal Palace	14	(0)
1976	→ St Patrick's Athletic (loan)	2	(0)
Total		510	(50)

International career
- England Schoolboy
- England Youth
1960	England Amateur	1	(0)
1962–1964	England U23	4	(0)
1964	England	2	(0)
	The Football League XI	1	(0)

Managerial career
- 1976–1980: Crystal Palace
- 1980–1984: Queens Park Rangers
- 1984–1987: Barcelona
- 1987–1991: Tottenham Hotspur
- 1994–1996: England
- 1996–1998: Australia
- 1998–1999: Crystal Palace
- 2000–2001: Middlesbrough
- 2002–2003: Leeds United
Medal record
Men's football
Representing Australia (as manager)
FIFA Confederations Cup
Runner-up	1997
- * Club domestic league appearances and goals

Terence Frederick Venables (6 January 1943 – 25 November 2023), often referred to as "El Tel", was an English football player and manager who played for clubs including Chelsea, Tottenham Hotspur and Queens Park Rangers and won two caps for England.

As a manager, Venables won the Second Division championship with Crystal Palace in 1979. He reached the 1982 FA Cup Final with Queens Park Rangers and won the Second Division in 1983. With Barcelona, he won La Liga in 1985 and reached the 1986 European Cup Final. He guided Tottenham Hotspur to victory in the 1991 FA Cup Final. He also managed Middlesbrough and Leeds United.

As the England national team manager from 1994 to 1996, he reached the semi-finals of the 1996 European Championships. His tactical style was modern and innovative, which was a contrast to the rigid tactical style that dominated English football at the time. Venables also had good personal relationships with the squad. He managed Australia from 1996 to 1998.

Venables also co-authored novels with writer Gordon Williams, for which they used the joint pseudonym "P.B. Yuill".

== Early life ==
Terence Frederick Venables was born at 313 Valence Avenue, Dagenham, Essex on 6 January 1943, the only child of Fred and Myrtle Venables. His father was a Navy petty officer who originally came from Barking. His mother was Welsh, from Clydach Vale. When he was 13, his parents moved to run a pub in Romford, Essex, sending him to live with his maternal grandparents Ossie and Milly, who fostered his love of football.

== Club career ==
Venables progressed from representing his county to earning caps for England Schoolboys, attracting interest from Chelsea, Tottenham Hotspur, West Ham United and Manchester United.

=== Chelsea ===
Venables left school in the summer of 1958 and signed for Chelsea as an apprentice at the age of 15. He later said that he joined Chelsea as he felt he had a better chance of breaking into the first team at Stamford Bridge and also because the club offered his father a job as a part-time scout. He denied West Ham's youth coach Malcolm Allison's claim he had only joined Chelsea for financial reasons. He delayed becoming a professional player so he could try for a place on the Great Britain squad for the 1960 Summer Olympics, turning professional after learning that he would not be selected for the squad. He won the FA Youth Cup with Chelsea in consecutive seasons, as they beat Preston North End in 1960 and Everton in 1961. He made his much-anticipated senior debut in a 4–2 defeat to West Ham United on 6th February 1960, with newspapers billing him as "the new Duncan Edwards".

Tommy Docherty joined Chelsea as player-coach in September 1961 and went on to replace Ted Drake as manager the following month. Docherty proved to be a successful manager at the club, promoting younger players who became known as "Docherty's Diamonds", and was a highly-influential coach in Venables' career, but the pair had a difficult relationship and Venables believed Docherty to be tactically limited. Chelsea were relegated at the end of the 1961–62 season, but managed to gain promotion out of the Second Division at the first attempt with a second-place finish in 1962–63. They went on to finish fifth in the First Division in the 1963–64 season. He took his FA coaching badges at the age of 24, passing with distinction and a 95% pass mark.

Venables went on to lift the League Cup with Chelsea and scored a penalty against Leicester City in the two-legged final. Chelsea also reached the semi-finals of the FA Cup in 1964–65, where they were knocked out by Liverpool. With three games left to play they were also in with an outside chance of overtaking Manchester United and Leeds United to win the league title, but Chelsea lost the first of these games 2–0 to Liverpool at Anfield. Docherty reversed his decision to allow the players a night out after the game, but Venables and seven other players (George Graham, Barry Bridges, John Hollins, Marvin Hinton, Eddie McCreadie, Joe Fascione and Bert Murray) broke curfew and went for a brief night out. Upon their return to the team hotel Docherty suspended all eight players for the remainder of the season. Chelsea then lost 6–2 to Burnley, before Docherty reinstated the players for a final-day defeat to Blackpool. Venables never forgave Docherty for the punishment, describing it as "crass, stupid and self-defeating". Docherty placed Venables on the transfer list towards the end of the 1965–66 season, with Chelsea again losing an FA Cup semi-final and heading towards a fifth-place finish.

=== Tottenham Hotspur ===
Venables was signed by Tottenham Hotspur for a fee of £80,000, and made his debut for the club in a 1–0 win at Blackburn Rovers on 9 May 1966. He soon made his presence felt when he punched club legend Dave Mackay during training, though no long-term rift developed because of the incident. Spurs went on to have a good 1966–67 season though, finishing third in the league and beating Millwall (after a replay), Portsmouth, Bristol City, Birmingham City (after a replay) and Nottingham Forest to reach the 1967 FA Cup Final to face his former club Chelsea at Wembley Stadium. Spurs won the cup with a 2–1 victory, Jimmy Robertson and Frank Saul providing the goals before Bobby Tambling scored a late consolation goal for Chelsea. Earlier in the season Venables had bet £25 on Chelsea to win the cup at odds of 25/1, which would have paid out £500 if Spurs had lost the game, exactly the same figure as the £500 cup bonus he would receive for winning the match; after tax deductions, Venables would have been better off financially if Chelsea had won.

Venables did not enjoy a great relationship with his manager, believing Bill Nicholson to have a negative attitude that drained him of enthusiasm. He also believed that he was not appreciated by the Spurs fans. The club dropped to seventh- and sixth-place finishes in 1967–68 and 1968–69, and Nicholson accepted an offer of £70,000 for Venables from Queens Park Rangers on 20 June 1969.

=== Queens Park Rangers ===
Venables later said that his transfer to Second Division QPR changed his life, and stated that "I cannot think of a transfer blessed with so much good fortune". Initially, Rangers could only manage mid-table finishes in the 1969–70 and 1970–71 campaigns, with Venables scoring 18 goals in 83 games. Chairman Jim Gregory opted to sack Les Allen and appoint Gordon Jago as manager, who took Rangers up to fourth-place in 1971–72 – just two points behind promoted Birmingham City. Once coach Bobby Campbell departed Loftus Road for Arsenal, Jago allowed Venables to supervise the club's training sessions. Rangers continued to progress, and won promotion in 1972–73 after securing runners-up spot with an 11-point gap over third-place Aston Villa.

=== Crystal Palace ===
Venables signed with Crystal Palace in 1974; he and Ian Evans were traded to Palace in exchange for Don Rogers. He made 14 Third Division appearances in the 1974–75 season before retiring due to arthritis on New Year's Eve. Manager Malcolm Allison gave him a coaching role for the second half of the campaign.

=== St Patrick's Athletic ===
Venables played for League of Ireland side St Patrick's Athletic for a short period between February and March 1976.

== International career ==
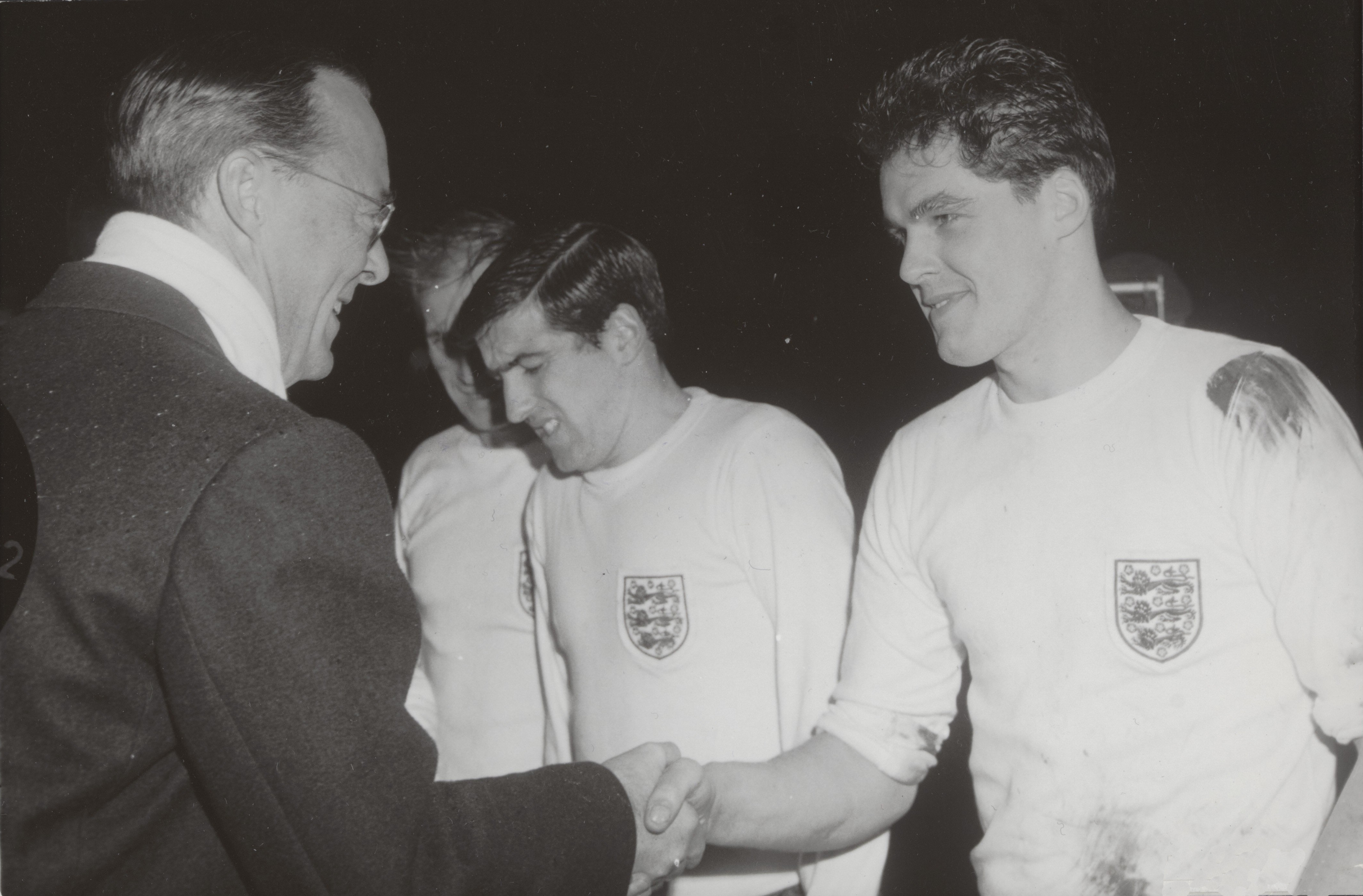
Venables (middle) with England in 1964 when he played against the Netherlands

As well as receiving two international caps, Venables held the distinction of being the only footballer to play for England at schoolboy, youth, amateur, Under-23, and for the full international team; as the amateur team was disbanded in 1974 no player was ever able to match his record. He was named by Alf Ramsey on the list of 33 "possibles" for the 1966 FIFA World Cup, having won two caps in 1964 – a 2–2 draw with Belgium and a 1–1 draw with the Netherlands, but did not make it into the final squad of 22.

== Managerial career ==
=== Crystal Palace ===
Venables worked as Malcolm Allison's coach for the 1975–76 season, when Palace reached the semi-finals of the FA Cup; however they lost the semi-final tie with Southampton and their subsequent league form suffered as they slipped back to fifth-place. Venables succeeded Allison as manager in June 1976. It proved to be a busy month for Venables, as he turned down the surprise offer to walk out on Palace to succeed Bertie Mee as Arsenal manager and also had a para-sailing accident in Mallorca which required 40 stitches.

As Crystal Palace manager, Venables built a young team of mostly youth team players and free transfer signings which the media dubbed the "Team of the Eighties". Star winger Peter Taylor was sold on to Spurs for £200,000, but most of this sum went on balancing the club's books. Venables spent £1,500 to sign striker Rachid Harkouk from Feltham, coming up with half of this sum out of his own funds on the understanding that he would receive 50% of any future transfer fee for the player. By March 1977, the board found enough money for Venables to purchase Jeff Bourne from Derby County for £30,000, and Bourne ended the 1976–77 campaign with nine goals in 15 games to help Palace to secure the third and final automatic promotion place.

His team adjusted well to the Second Division and finished in ninth-place in 1977–78, before going on to win promotion as champions in 1978–79. They secured the title with a final day victory over Burnley in a rearranged fixture some days after all their promotion rivals had completed their fixtures; the win meant that they leapfrogged Brighton & Hove Albion, Stoke City and Sunderland, and they denied their M23 derby rivals from the south coast what would have been their club's highest honour.

His first season as a manager in the First Division, in the 1979–80 season, started successfully, and on 29 September, Crystal Palace were top of the English Football League for one week. They ended back down in 13th-place, which was at that time the club's highest ever league finish.

The following season started badly for Venables; expensive high-profile signings failed to gel, and by October 1980, Palace were bottom of the First Division, attendance was plummeting and the club was in financial difficulties. Venables left during October to join Second Division Queens Park Rangers; although the exact reasons behind his sudden departure have never been made clear.

=== Queens Park Rangers ===
Venables left Palace, in the top division, for Queens Park Rangers, who were in the Second Division. His departure from Selhurst Park coincided with a decline in form for Palace, who were relegated at the end of the season and did not regain their top flight status for another eight years. Venables drew a number of players over to Queens Park Rangers which, as reported at the time, gave an additional financial boost to his personal earnings.

Venables took QPR back into the First Division as Second Division champions in 1983. He also guided Rangers to the FA Cup final in 1982, whilst still a Second Division side, but lost in a replay against his former club Tottenham.

His final season as QPR manager, 1983–84, brought more success as they finished fifth in the league (their highest finish since they were runners-up in 1976) and qualified for the UEFA Cup. Venables then moved to Spain to take over at Barcelona, while his former teammate Alan Mullery took over from him at Loftus Road in an ill-fated arrangement that lasted just six months.

=== Barcelona ===
Venables gained a good reputation as a manager with his successes at Crystal Palace and QPR, and this attracted offers from some of Europe's most prestigious clubs. In 1984, Venables took the role of manager at Barcelona, earning the sobriquet "El Tel" by the English tabloid newspapers. He was recommended by Bobby Robson and Doug Ellis to Joan Gaspart, the F.C. Barcelona vice-president at the time. Venables used a very English system, a classic 4–4–2, which took advantage of outstanding defenders like Gerardo, Migueli and Julio Alberto, and a hard-working midfield led by West German Bernd Schuster. During his three seasons in Catalonia, Venables led the club to the Spanish league title in 1985 (their first since 1974). He also won the 1986 Copa de la Liga, and led them to the Copa del Rey final in 1986 losing to Real Zaragoza.

Barcelona also reached the 1986 European Cup Final, although they lost to Steaua București in a penalty shoot-out following a 0–0 draw. It was Barcelona's first appearance in a European Cup final since 1961 and had been achieved after one of the most dramatic European Cup semi-finals in the history of the competition. Venables' side overcame a 3–0 first-leg defeat to Swedish club IFK Göteborg, winning the second-leg of the 1986 semi-final at the Camp Nou in a penalty shoot-out after a 3–3 aggregate score.

Venables brought two British strikers to Barcelona in 1986 – Gary Lineker from Everton and Mark Hughes from Manchester United. Lineker was a great success at the Camp Nou, scoring 21 goals during his first season, including a hat-trick in a 3–2 win over Real Madrid. Lineker spent three years at Barcelona, until Venables brought him back to England with his new club Tottenham Hotspur in 1989. Hughes was less successful and spent just one season in the Barcelona side, before being loaned to Bayern Munich.

Venables was dismissed by Barcelona in September 1987, after failing to repeat his title success at the Camp Nou and losing home and away to eventual finalists Dundee United in the quarter-finals of the UEFA Cup six months earlier.

=== Tottenham Hotspur ===
On 23 November 1987, he returned to England to manage Tottenham Hotspur. His success with the Spurs team was varied, with the side finishing in mid-table for most of his tenure, though they did win the FA Cup in 1991 and finished third in the league in 1990. Venables had brought both Gary Lineker and Paul Gascoigne to Spurs and was a favourite to replace Bobby Robson as England national football team manager when the job became vacant in 1990, but he was overlooked in favour of Graham Taylor.

After a failed £20m bid to take over Spurs with Larry Gillick, Venables was appointed chief executive by Alan Sugar, who had won the takeover battle against Robert Maxwell in June 1991. Over the next two seasons, the Spurs team was managed by Peter Shreeves and then the joint management team of Ray Clemence and Doug Livermore, with the final arrangement seeing Venables having more involvement with the first team. A clash of personalities developed and Sugar dismissed Venables on 14 May 1993, over his business dealings. After gaining a temporary injunction, he was reinstated, but lost a three-day high court hearing and ordered to pay costs.

=== England ===
Venables was appointed manager of the England national team on 28 January 1994, having been recommended to the FA by Jimmy Armfield. He came under intense scrutiny and censure in the media for his business dealings, which led MP Kate Hoey to state in Parliament that Venables was unfit for the post of national team manager. He appointed Bryan Robson, Don Howe and Mike Kelly as coaches, and put Dave Sexton in charge of the England under-21 team. He took England to a second-place finish in the Umbro Cup in June 1995, but temporarily froze Paul Ince out of the international set-up after Ince declined to play in the tournament.

As England automatically qualified for UEFA Euro 1996 as hosts, he organised friendlies to allow him to experiment and find his best squad for the tournament, and particularly to find the best tactical system to suit the players. Venables decided to stand down at the end of Euro 1996 after the FA's International Committee chairman Noel White refused to grant Venables a contract extension in December 1995; the FA insisted on evaluating England's performances in competitive fixtures before deciding on his future. In May 1996, Glenn Hoddle was announced as his successor, meaning that Venables would have no choice but to stand down as manager no matter how well England performed at the tournament.

Having selected David Platt as captain during the friendly matches, Venables decided to appoint Tony Adams as captain for Euro 1996. He stood by his players in the face of media criticism before and during the tournament, which grew particularly intense after Paul Gascoigne and several others were photographed drunk in a nightclub during a team stay in Hong Kong; Venables went so far as to accuse some reporters as being "traitors" for what he described as a "witch-hunt" against England players. England drew with Switzerland in the opening group game before beating Scotland 2–0 and the Netherlands 4–1. After his retirement, Venables described the win over the Netherlands as "perfection – my most thrilling experience in football". England advanced past Spain in the quarter-finals with a victory on penalties, before being eliminated by Germany on penalties at the semi-finals following a 1–1 draw and a missed penalty by Gareth Southgate.

According to Alan Shearer, who played for Venables at Euro '96, "Terry's knowledge and tactical know-how were spot-on and he knew how to get the best out of us too. We responded to him, believed in him and played some outstanding football in that tournament." Southgate said, "Terry opened my eyes to things that no one else has. He has fantastic tactical awareness. Every senior player in the group went away having learnt a lot from him, which is an achievement." On the Euro '96 team, Rob Smyth wrote in The Guardian, "Under the managership of Terry Venables, this was an admirably enlightened, flexible and relaxed England side, one for the modern age; they even played a genuine 3–5–2... against Scotland and Germany. But they still weren't actually that good." Smyth argued there were "only two decent performances" by England in the tournament, against the Netherlands and Germany.

=== Australia ===
Venables became manager of Australia in November 1996, following the resignation of Eddie Thomson. In the 1997 Confederations Cup, Venables led Australia to the final before defeat to Brazil. His side swept through the Oceania World Cup qualifiers, but were beaten in November 1997 in a play-off by Iran. The teams drew the first leg 1–1 in Tehran. Australia led the second leg 2–0 early in the second half, but they conceded two late goals to miss out on qualification for the 1998 World Cup on the away goals rule. Venables' tenure as Australia coach ended the following June. While Australia had never made the top 50 in the FIFA Men's World Ranking before his tenure, they reached the top 30 under him. During his time managing Australia, Soccer Australia attempted to nominate Venables as the Australian representative on the Football Association council, though this attempt was denied.

=== Return to Crystal Palace ===
In summer 1998, he returned to Crystal Palace who had just been taken over by Mark Goldberg. Venables left acrimoniously in January 1999, as the south-London club went into administration. His appointment had created a media frenzy, with Goldberg boasting that he was going to turn Palace into a European force within the next five years. After a spell of inconsistent results the Goldberg dream of building Palace as a force was over in January 1999 when Venables was released as the club faced financial problems and narrowly avoided going out of business, although they did at least finish in a secure position in Division One.

=== Middlesbrough ===
Having been linked with Chelsea weeks earlier, Venables was appointed head coach at Middlesbrough in December 2000 in a bid to help the club avoid relegation. Venables had initially turned down the offer due to his media and business interests, but he accepted when Middlesbrough offered him the job on a short-term basis. Incumbent manager Bryan Robson remained at the club, but Venables made team selection decisions. Results improved under Venables, and the club eventually avoided relegation by finishing in 14th place. Venables left Middlesbrough in June 2001, soon after Robson, with the club saying that his media commitments made it impossible for him to continue. Venables had signed a new five-year contract with ITV Sport in May 2001.

=== Leeds United ===
In July 2002, Venables was released from his ITV punditry job to become Leeds United manager on a two-year deal, replacing the sacked David O'Leary. Two weeks into his tenure, defender Rio Ferdinand was sold to Manchester United for £30 million as the Elland Road club sought to clear £78 million of debt. The team were knocked out of the Football League Cup by second-tier Sheffield United in the second round; Neil Warnock's Sheffield United would also defeat Leeds in that season's FA Cup.

Leeds were further weakened in January 2003, when Jonathan Woodgate was sold to Newcastle United without Venables being informed, in an attempt to pay off mounting debts. Venables threatened to leave if Woodgate was sold, but was persuaded to stay by Peter Ridsdale. With the club spiralling towards relegation, and amid later substantiated rumours of further player sales by the board, Venables was sacked in March 2003.

=== Later career ===
Venables was linked with Australian club Newcastle Jets in 2005, but his commitments in the UK prevented him from taking up a role within the club, and his agent announced that he did not sign any deal with the club. At the end of the 2005–06 season, he was linked with a return to Middlesbrough, but decided that at his age he would be unable to manage a Premier League club full-time. Later in the year, Venables returned to the England set-up as assistant to new manager Steve McClaren. He was later sacked from this role in November 2007, along with McClaren, after England failed to qualify for Euro 2008.

Venables was later linked in the media with many managerial vacancies, including those at the Republic of Ireland, Bulgaria, Queen's Park Rangers, Hull City, and Wales. He turned down an offer to manage Newcastle United on a caretaker basis in September 2008, following the departure of Kevin Keegan. In 2012, he was hired by non-League club Wembley as a technical adviser.

== Managerial style and reputation ==
Venables described himself as a "players' man", who gave players freedom off the pitch and defended them if they were criticised in the media. He was reluctant to praise players during his half-time team talks to avoid complacency, and believed it was important to keep his words brief and the tone light-hearted so players could take on board key points and remain in good spirits for the second half. In 2007, Rob Smyth of The Guardian described Venables' tactical approach with England at Euro 96 as "flexible" and "modern", noting his use of the 3–5–2 formation in certain matches. He also often used a 4–4–1–1 formation throughout the tournament. At Barcelona, Venables had employed a "classic English" 4–4–2 formation, utilising strong defenders, a hard-working midfield, and opportunistic forwards.

Following his death, Phil McNulty of BBC Sport wrote that Venables was known for his "superb man-management style and his razor-sharp tactical acumen", saying that he was "one of football's brightest minds and most innovative coaches". Gary Lineker considered Venables "the best English coach we've had" and likened him to Pep Guardiola, saying, "he was charming, charismatic, witty but he was also tough — and that's what you needed to be. He understood football — he had an incredible football brain." Bryan Robson called him "a great motivator and communicator", and Gary Neville said that Venables' ability "to change systems during matches and from game to game was incredible, it blew my mind". Neville added in a social media post that he was required to play in different roles under Venables throughout Euro 96, depending on the opponent, including as a right-back (his typical role), a right-sided centre-back, a right-sided wing-back, and a right winger. Ange Postecoglou, the former head coach of Tottenham Hotspur, said, "If you are asking about a person who embodies everything this football club has always wanted to be, it is Terry. It wasn't just about the way he managed or coached; it was the person he was... but the biggest testament is that anyone who I have ever come across that has worked with him will say he is by far the best coach, manager and tactician they have come across."

According to Luke Ginnell, writing for football magazine FourFourTwo, Venables' career "arguably promised more than it delivered", and he was dubbed the "False Messiah" by sports writer Mihir Bose. The Times described Venables as a "wide boy with a history of trouble off the pitch". According to Richard Williams, "those who distrusted Venables were shouted down by those who had actually played under him, and who regard him—with rare unanimity—as possessing one of this country's very few exceptional football intellects." Writing for The Observer in 2004, Bill Borrows questioned why Venables, "who has won so little and failed at so much," was "considered by his peers to be 'synonymous with success'." Borrows wrote, "He has lost a couple of big games on penalties and even led Spurs to third in the League. But, in truth, his record isn't good enough, certainly when compared to the best managers, such as Brian Clough."

== Personal life ==
Venables married Christine McCann, a dressmaker, in 1966. They had two daughters before divorcing in 1984. He met his second wife Yvette Bazire in 1984, in his father's pub in Chingford, Greater London. She accompanied him to Barcelona when he was appointed their manager and they married in 1991. She managed his Kensington dining club, Scribes West, for seven years. He sold it in 1997.

=== Business interests ===
One of his first business ventures was to open a tailors in the West End of London, along with Chelsea teammates George Graham and Ron "Chopper" Harris; the business proved unsuccessful and eventually filed for bankruptcy.

On 14 January 1998, he was disqualified by the high court from acting as a company director for seven years under section 8 of the Company Directors Disqualification Act 1986 for mismanagement of four companies – Scribes West Ltd, Edenote plc, Tottenham Hotspur plc and Tottenham Hotspur Football and Athletic Company Ltd. The case was brought by the Department of Trade and Industry, who cited instances of bribery, lying, deception, manipulation of accounts and taking money that should have been given to creditors.

Venables combined his duties with Australia for a period as consultant and then chairman at Portsmouth. He purchased a 51% controlling interest in the club for £1 in February 1997, but left in controversial circumstances 11 months later. His company Vencorp received a £300,000 bonus in the summer of 1997 and he is thought to have been paid around £250,000 upon leaving the club, but he left them bottom of Division One. Although Portsmouth avoided relegation 1997–98, their financial situation worsened and they were in real danger of bankruptcy, until being taken over by Milan Mandarić in late 1999.

In 2014, together with his wife, Venables opened a boutique hotel and restaurant in Penàguila, in the Alicante province of Spain. It was sold in early 2019, when they decided to retire.

=== Other work ===
Venables served the Professional Footballers' Association as vice-chairman in the 1970s, and represented QPR teammate Dave Thomas at his tribunal against Burnley chairman Bob Lord.

Venables co-authored five novels with writer Gordon Williams: They Used to Play on Grass (1972), The Bornless Keeper (1974), Hazell Plays Solomon (1974), Hazell and the Three Card Trick (1975), and Hazell and the Menacing Jester (1976). They used the pseudonym "P.B. Yuill" after completing the first book as Venables felt critics dismissed his contribution to They Used to Play on Grass as a gimmick. They Used to Play on Grass was voted at number 172 in the BBC's The Big Read survey in 2003. "P.B. Yuill" is credited as co-creator of the ITV detective series Hazell.

Having been a football pundit for BBC since the mid-1980s, he left for ITV in 1994, following a legal dispute with the corporation over allegations made against him in a Panorama programme. In 1990, Venables co-devised the board game "Terry Venables invites you to be... The Manager".

Venables's parents were both talented singers who encouraged their son to take it up. At the age of 17, he entered a singing competition at Butlins in Clacton-on-Sea, although Chelsea did not allow him to compete in the final stages. In 2002, he recorded a single for the World Cup together with the band Rider. "England Crazy" reached number 46 in the UK charts. In 2010, he recorded a cover of the Elvis Presley song "If I Can Dream" in association with British newspaper The Sun. It featured a 60-piece Royal Philharmonic Orchestra with the video shot on The O2 Arena's roof while another video, used for the Sun's TV advert, featured Harry Redknapp and Ian Wright as part of the choir and was filmed at Wembley Stadium. The song reached number 23 in the UK charts on 13 June. Outside of singing, Venables gave permission for his image to appear on the cover of the 1995 Morrissey single "Dagenham Dave".

=== Death ===
Venables died on 25 November 2023, at the age of 80, following a long illness. On 26 November, Tottenham Hotspur announced that its players would be wearing black armbands, and that there would be a minute's applause in his honour at their home game against Aston Villa that day.

== Career statistics ==
=== Player ===
Appearances and goals by club, season and competition
Club	Season	League			FA Cup		Other		Total	
Club	Season	Division	Apps	Goals	Apps	Goals	Apps	Goals	Apps	Goals
Chelsea	1959–60	First Division	1	0	0	0	0	0	1	0
Chelsea	1960–61	First Division	36	0	1	0	3	0	40	0
Chelsea	1961–62	First Division	12	1	0	0	0	0	12	1
Chelsea	1962–63	Second Division	42	2	4	1	0	0	46	3
Chelsea	1963–64	First Division	38	8	3	0	0	0	41	8
Chelsea	1964–65	First Division	39	7	5	0	5	1	49	8
Chelsea	1965–66	First Division	34	8	6	0	8	3	48	11
Chelsea	Total		202	26	19	1	16	4	237	31
Tottenham Hotspur	1965–66	First Division	1	0	0	0	0	0	1	0
Tottenham Hotspur	1966–67	First Division	41	3	8	2	1	0	50	5
Tottenham Hotspur	1967–68	First Division	36	2	4	0	5	1	45	3
Tottenham Hotspur	1968–69	First Division	37	0	4	0	5	1	46	1
Tottenham Hotspur	Total		115	5	16	2	11	2	142	9
Queens Park Rangers	1969–70	Second Division	34	5	4	1	4	1	42	7
Queens Park Rangers	1970–71	Second Division	38	10	1	0	2	1	41	11
Queens Park Rangers	1971–72	Second Division	27	1	2	0	4	0	33	1
Queens Park Rangers	1972–73	Second Division	37	1	1	0	1	0	39	1
Queens Park Rangers	1973–74	First Division	36	2	6	0	3	0	45	2
Queens Park Rangers	1974–75	First Division	5	0	0	0	1	0	6	0
Queens Park Rangers	Total		177	19	14	1	15	2	206	22
Crystal Palace	1974–75	Third Division	14	0	2	0	0	0	16	0
St Patrick's Athletic (loan)	1975–76	League of Ireland	2	0	0	0	0	0	2	0
Career total			510	50	51	4	42	8	603	62

=== Managerial record ===
Managerial record by team and tenure
Team	From	To	Record				
Team	From	To	P	W	D	L	Win %
Crystal Palace	16 June 1976	1 October 1980	208	76	74	58	36.5
Queens Park Rangers	1 October 1980	24 May 1984	179	89	36	54	49.7
Barcelona	June 1984	September 1987	168	86	53	29	51.2
Tottenham Hotspur	28 November 1987	30 June 1991	165	67	46	52	40.6
England	28 January 1994	30 July 1996	23	11	11	1	47.8
Australia	November 1996	1998	23	15	3	5	65.2
Crystal Palace	4 June 1998	15 January 1999	31	11	8	12	35.5
Middlesbrough	6 December 2000	12 June 2001	25	8	11	6	32.0
Leeds United	8 July 2002	21 March 2003	42	16	7	19	38.1
Total			864	379	249	236	43.9

== Honours ==
=== Player ===
Chelsea

- Football League Cup: 1964–65
- Football League Second Division runner-up: 1962–63

Tottenham Hotspur

- FA Cup: 1966–67
- FA Charity Shield: 1967 (shared)

Queens Park Rangers

- Football League Second Division runner-up: 1972–73

=== Manager ===
Crystal Palace

- Football League Second Division: 1978–79
- Football League Third Division third-place promotion: 1976–77

Queens Park Rangers

- Football League Second Division: 1982–83
- FA Cup runner-up: 1981–82

Barcelona

- La Liga: 1984–85
- Copa de la Liga: 1986
- Copa del Rey runner-up: 1985–86
- Supercopa de España runner-up: 1985
- European Cup runner-up: 1985–86

Tottenham Hotspur

- FA Cup: 1990–91
- FA Charity Shield : 1991 (shared)

Australia

- FIFA Confederations Cup runner-up: 1997

Individual

- Don Balón Award: 1985
- English Football Hall of Fame: 1997 (inducted)
- Premier League Manager of the Month: January 2001

== Sources ==
- Venables, Terry; Hanson, Neil (1994), Venables: The Autobiography, Michael Joseph, ISBN 0-14-024077-2
- Venables, Terry (1996), Venables' England: The Making of the Team, Boxtree, ISBN 0-7522-1664-3
- Venables, Terry (1997), The Best Game in the World, Century, ISBN 0-09-918562-8
- Venables, Terry; Alex, Montgomery (2014), Born to Manage: The Autobiography, Simon & Schuster, ISBN 978-1-47112-991-9
