= The Cotter's Saturday Night =

Poem by Robert Burns

- by Robert Burns
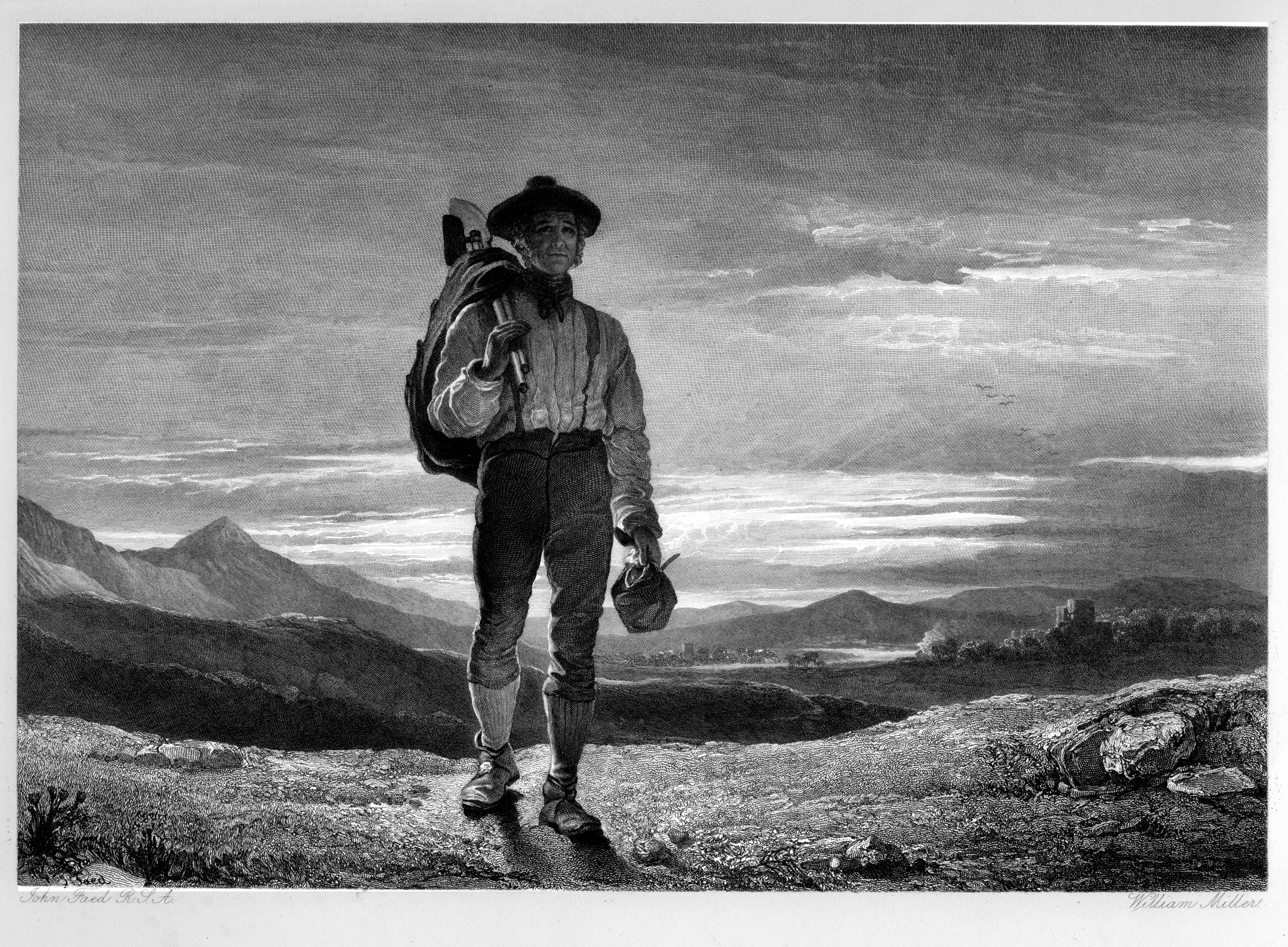
- "The toil-worn Cotter frae his labour goes", engraving by William Miller.
- Written: Winter, 1785-86
- First published in: 31 July 1786
- Country: Scotland
- Language: English and Scots
- Form: Spenserian stanza
- Rhyme scheme: ABABBCBCC
- Publisher: John Wilson

Full text
- The Cotter's Saturday Night at Wikisource

The Cotter's Saturday Night is a poem by Robert Burns that was first published in Poems, Chiefly in the Scottish Dialect in 1786.

== Composition ==
Burns wrote "The Cotter's Saturday Night" at Mossgiel Farm, near Mauchline, during the winter of 1785-86. He adopted the lengthy Spenserian stanza form from Robert Fergusson's similarly themed 1773 poem "The Farmer's Ingle" to allow space to evoke his pastoral scene. An extract from another major influence, Thomas Gray's "Elegy Written in a Country Churchyard", is used as an epigraph. The poem is dedicated to Robert Aiken, a successful Ayrshire lawyer who was Burns's patron at the time, and the opening stanza addresses him in advancing the poem's sentimental theme.

What Aiken in a cottage would have been;
Ah! tho' his worth unknown, far happier there, I ween! (lines 8-9)

== Summary ==
On a cold Saturday evening in November, a Scottish cotter—a peasant farmer who labours in return for the right to live in a cottage—returns home to his family ahead of the Sabbath. His wife and numerous children gather round the fire to share their news, while he gives out fatherly advice and admonition based on Christian teachings.

"And O! be sure to fear the Lord alway,
And mind your duty, duly, morn and night;
Lest in temptation's path ye gang astray,
Implore His counsel and assisting might:
They never sought in vain that sought the Lord aright." (lines 50-54)

A boy from a neighbouring farm comes to call on the cotter's oldest daughter. The cotter's wife is pleased to see that the boy is not a rake and truly loves her daughter, and the cotter welcomes him into his home. The family then eat supper, after which they gather round the fire again as the cotter reads aloud from the Bible and the family sing hymns—Burns compares the family's humble devotions favourably with "Religion's pride"—before the oldest children return to their homes and the rest of the family go to bed. The poem concludes by eulogising the morality of such family life and how it does credit to Scotland.

From scenes like these, old Scotia's grandeur springs,
That makes her lov'd at home, rever'd abroad (lines 163-4)

== Legacy ==
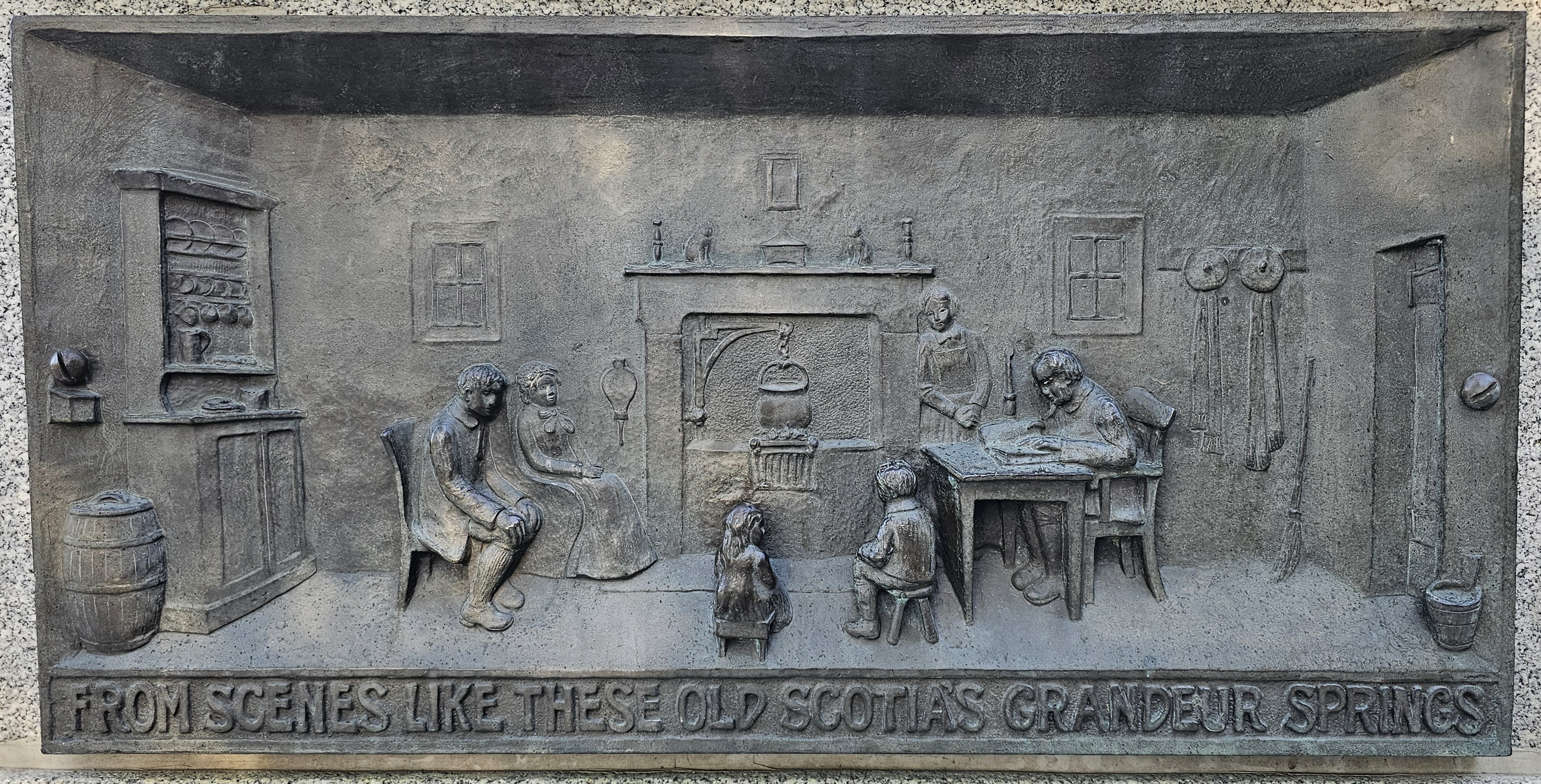
Plaque depicting a scene from the poem on the Robert Burns Memorial Statue in Fredericton

"The Cotter's Saturday Night" has inspired numerous works of art and literature. The Scottish painter John Faed produced a series of illustrations featuring scenes from the poem, some of which were subsequently engraved by William Miller. Scenes from the poem also inspired paintings by David Wilkie and William Kidd, and William Allan's painting of Burns writing the poem was subsequently engraved by John Burnet.

Bas-relief panels featuring scenes from the poem adorn a number of statues of Robert Burns, including: George Edwin Ewing's statue in George Square, Glasgow; Charles Calverley's statue in Washington Park, Albany, New York; and George Anderson Lawson's statue in Victoria Park, Halifax, Nova Scotia.

The title of the Booker Prize-nominated novel From Scenes Like These by Gordon Williams ironically quotes the opening line of the poem's nineteenth stanza.
