= They Used to Play on Grass =

1972 novel by Terry Venables and Gordon Williams

- First edition
- Author: Terry Venables and Gordon Williams
- Language: English
- Genre: Sport, adult fiction
- Published: 1972
- Publisher: Hodder & Stoughton
- Publication place: England
- Pages: 256

They Used to Play on Grass is a 1972 novel by former English footballer Terry Venables and Scottish author Gordon Williams. The novel predicted the end of grass as a playing surface, and that plastic pitches would become the norm in football. In 2003 the book was listed at No 172 on the BBC's The Big Read poll of the UK's "best-loved novel".
