= From Scenes Like These =

1968 novel by Gordon Williams

- First edition
- Author: Gordon Williams
- Genre: Bildungsroman
- Publisher: Secker & Warburg
- Publication date: 1968
- Publication place: Scotland
- Media type: Print
- Pages: 317
- ISBN: 1-87363-167-7
- OCLC: 37246162

From Scenes Like These is a 1968 novel by Gordon Williams. The novel, first published by Secker & Warburg, was shortlisted for the inaugural Booker Prize in 1969. The title is taken from "The Cotter's Saturday Night", a poem by Robert Burns that describes Scottish rural life in an idyllic light.

== Summary ==
Set in the west of Scotland during the 1950s, From Scenes Like These follows fifteen-year-old Duncan Logan as he leaves school to work on a farm. His youthful aspirations, fostered by reading authors such as John Dos Passos, are thwarted as he enters an adult world defined by alcohol, violence and betrayal, with his family scorning his attempts to better himself.

== Reception ==
From Scenes Like These was shortlisted for the inaugural Booker Prize in 1969, which was won by P. H. Newby for Something to Answer For. In 1980, when From Scenes Like These was reissued by Allison & Busby, along with two other novels by Wiliams – The Camp and Walk, Don't Walk – critic Ian Hamilton wrote in the London Review of Books that "they are among the most genuine and entertaining British fiction to have appeared in the last couple of decades." In 2003, the critic D. J. Taylor described From Scenes Like These as "one of the greatest novels of the postwar era".
