= George Washington Moon =

English writer

George Washington Moon, F. R. S. L.
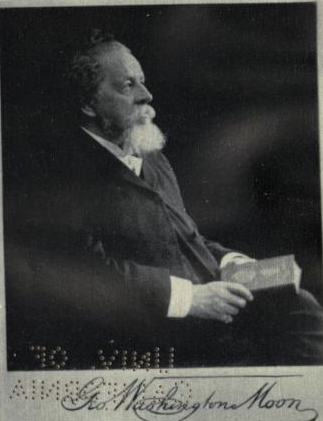
- Born: 1823
- Died: 1909 (aged 85–86); Brighton, England
- Writing career
- Notable work: Elijah the Prophet

George Washington Moon (1823 – 1909) was an English writer, poet and critic of the late nineteenth and early twentieth century.

Moon published several poems, contributed to the Dictionary of National Biography, and wrote a number of books on English grammar. Several of these books were lengthy compilations of the purported grammatical errors of specific writers, which led to vigorous counterattacks and controversies.

George Washington Moon is the author of a book-length epic poem, Elijah the Prophet (1866). It was written in Spenserian stanza, a nine-line strophe with rhyme scheme ABABBCBCC.

== Other works ==
- The Monograph Gospel, being the Four Gospels Arranged in One Continuous Narrative in the Words of Scripture, Without Omission of Fact or Repetition of Statement
- The King's English
- The Soul's Inquiries; Answered in the Words of Scripture
- The Soul's Desires Breathed to God in the Words of Scripture
- The Soul's Comfort in Sorrow
- Elijah the Prophet, an Epic Poem
- The Revisers' English ... a Series of Criticisms, Showing the Revisers' Violations of the Laws of Language (1882)
- Ecclesiastical English: A Series Of Criticisms Showing The Old Testament Revisers' Violations Of The Laws Of The Language: Illustrated By More Than 1000 Quotations: Being Part II Of The Revisers' English (1886)
- He, With All My Worldly Goods, I Thee Endow She, But, What Is Written In The Law, How Readest You? A Novel (1890)
- The Dean's English: A Criticism on the Dean of Canterbury's Essays on the Queen's English
- Learned Men's English: The Grammarians: A Series Of Criticisms On The English Of Dean Alford, Lindley Murray, And Other Writers On The Language
- The Oldest Type-printed Book In Existence: A Disquisition On The Relative Antiquity Of The Pfister And Mazarin Bibles And The 64-line A Catholicon: Prefaced By A Brief History Of The Invention Of Printing
- Men and Women of the Time: A Dictionary of Contemporaries

== Bibliography ==
- George Washington Moon, Elijah the Prophet, London 1867.
