= Straw Dogs (2011 film) =

- Theatrical release poster
- Directed by: Rod Lurie
- Screenplay by: Rod Lurie
- Based on: Straw Dogs (1971 film) by David Zelag Goodman Sam Peckinpah; The Siege of Trencher's Farm (1969 novel) by Gordon Williams
- Produced by: Rod Lurie; Marc Frydman
- Starring: James Marsden; Kate Bosworth; Alexander Skarsgård; Dominic Purcell; Laz Alonso; Willa Holland; James Woods
- Cinematography: Alik Sakharov
- Edited by: Sarah Boyd
- Music by: Larry Groupé
- Production companies: Screen Gems; Battleplan Productions
- Distributed by: Sony Pictures Releasing
- Release date: September 16, 2011
- Running time: 109 minutes
- Country: United States
- Language: English
- Budget: $25 million
- Box office: $11.2 million

Straw Dogs is a 2011 American Southern Gothic psychological thriller film written, produced and directed by Rod Lurie, and starring James Marsden, Kate Bosworth, and Alexander Skarsgård. It is a remake of Sam Peckinpah's 1971 film, itself based on the Gordon Williams novel The Siege of Trencher's Farm. The film relocates the story's setting from Cornwall to rural Mississippi.

The film was released by Sony Pictures Releasing on September 16, 2011. It was a commercial disappointment and received mixed-to-negative reviews, with many reviewers comparing it critically to its source material.

== Plot ==
Scriptwriter David Sumner and his wife Amy, an actress, relocate to a rural small unincorporated community of Blackwater in Marshall County, Mississippi, where Amy grew up. They are going to live in the house of Amy's recently deceased father to allow David to finish a script.

While in town one afternoon, David meets Amy's ex-boyfriend Charlie and his three friends, Norman, Chris, and Bic. David is intimidated by the men, but they have already been hired to fix the roof of the barn on Amy's property. He also meets Tom Heddon, an alcoholic former high school football coach whose 15-year-old cheerleader daughter Janice is head over heels in love with a local man with an intellectual disability, Jeremy Niles. Heddon often bullies Jeremy and believes that he is stalking his daughter, even though it's clear Jeremy does not like Janice at all.

Charlie and his friends arrive early the next morning to work on the roof. They taunt David, which later escalates into harassment. They also make crude remarks toward Amy and play loud music to distract David while he writes. They often leave early when they want to go hunting, which concerns David because it is taking them a significant amount of time to finish the roof. Amy begins to resent David for not standing up to the men.

One Sunday after church, Heddon attacks Jeremy for talking to Janice, and Amy comes to his defense, but David warns her to not get involved. Later that night back at home, David discovers their cat strangled and hung up in the bedroom closet. Amy is positive that Charlie and his friends are to blame as they disappeared from the church barbeque for a few hours earlier, but David is hesitant to confront them. When he does finally question them, the men deny everything.

Charlie invites David to go deer hunting. While David is out in the woods with two of the men, Charlie goes back to the house, pushes his way inside, and rapes Amy while making crude remarks about having sex either with him or with David, because he thinks that she still wants him. Afterwards, he realizes that she did not want any sexual contact and is stunned. Norman arrives, holds Amy across the top of the couch, and rapes her while Charlie watches. They then leave. When David returns, Amy doesn't tell him what happened. Instead, she encourages David to fire Charlie and his men. The next day David tells Charlie that fixing the roof is taking too long. Charlie insists that they have already paid for the roofing supplies, which David agrees to pay for. Finally, Charlie and his crew leave, celebrating their $5,000 payday.

David and Amy go to a local football game. Janice lures Jeremy into an empty locker room. Heddon notices that his daughter is missing from the game and goes in search of her. Meanwhile, Janice confesses her love to Jeremy and tries to convince to let her have oral sex with him, but Jeremy makes it clear he never liked her at all and tries to get her away from him. His rejection enrages Janice and she tries to orally rape him. They hear Heddon calling for Janice. Afraid of Heddon finding them, Jeremy holds Janice tight against his body with his hand over her mouth and nose, accidentally smothering her to death. Horrified, he runs away from the school. Heddon goes back to tell Charlie and his friends that Janice is missing. They all suspect that Jeremy has done something to her.

At the game, Amy has haunting flashbacks about the rapes and asks David to take her home. On the way, she tells him that she wants to return to Los Angeles, surprising him and causing him to accidentally run over Jeremy, who walks out of the darkness into the road, breaking his arm. David and Amy take him back to their home and call an ambulance. Charlie and Norman overhear the ambulance call on a police scanner and inform Heddon. They all drive to David and Amy's house and demand that the couple hand Jeremy over, but David refuses. The sheriff arrives shortly thereafter and tries to calm down the situation. He knocks on the door and tells David to open the door, but David still refuses. Heddon picks up his gun again and shoots the sheriff dead. Having witnessed the murder, David knows now that the men will try to kill not only Jeremy but both of them, too. David and Amy barricade the doors shut. He enlists her to help him open the jaws of a decorative bear trap. Then he sends Amy upstairs with Jeremy. David looks frantically for something he can use in the house to fight off the men.

When Chris attempts to enter through a window, David nails his hands to the wall with a nail gun, his throat fatally exposed to broken glass. When Heddon tries to follow, David burns his face with hot oil. Heddon and Charlie use the pick-up truck to ram into the house, but Charlie is knocked unconscious. David fights Heddon off and causes him to shoot himself in the foot. David then shoots Heddon as he tries to shoot David with a revolver and then proceeds to beat Bic to death with a fireplace poker.

Upstairs, Amy and Jeremy are attacked by Norman, who has climbed in through the window. Norman is attempting to rape Amy again when David and Charlie appear. Charlie and Norman draw on each other when Norman threatens to kill Amy. Amy shoots Norman, Charlie assaults and disarms her, then David jumps him. Charlie kicks David down the stairs and beats him severely. As Charlie is preparing to shoot the now-disarmed David lying on the floor, Amy approaches from behind with a shotgun. Charlie turns and tells her the gun is empty. "I will always protect you, baby," declares Charlie, as David rises to slam the open bear trap down on his head, impaling and breaking his neck and crushing his windpipe. Charlie slowly dies while Amy and David watch quietly. At first, Amy is horrified at the scene but later takes solace in knowing her rapists are dead.

As sirens are heard, with the adjacent barn in flames, David says, "I got 'em all.”

== Cast ==
- James Marsden as David Sumner
- Kate Bosworth as Amy Sumner
- Alexander Skarsgård as Charlie Venner
- Dominic Purcell as Jeremy Niles
- Rhys Coiro as Norman
- Willa Holland as Janice Heddon
- James Woods as Tom "Coach Tom" Heddon
- Billy Lush as Chris
- Laz Alonso as Sheriff John Burke
- Walton Goggins as Daniel Niles
- Anson Mount as Coach Milkens
- Drew Powell as Bic

== Production ==
The film was originally scheduled for release on February 25, 2011. However the date was pushed to September 16, 2011. The film began shooting on August 16, 2009 in Shreveport and Vivian, Louisiana.

Kate Bosworth said that to make the rape scene more lifelike, she told her co-star Alexander Skarsgård not to hold back as he pretended to perform the violent sex assault for the cameras.

== Release ==
=== Box office ===
Straw Dogs lost money. It opened on September 16, 2011 with $1,980,000 for the day. and took $5.1 million in its opening weekend. The total domestic and international sales were $11,168,712, versus an estimated budget of $25m.

=== Critical reception ===
The film received mixed reviews; Rotten Tomatoes gives the film a score of 42% based on reviews from 125 critics, with the consensus "This remake streamlines the plot but ultimately makes a fatal mistake: It celebrates violence". Metacritic gives the film a score of 45% based on 29 reviews, indicating "mixed or average reviews". Audiences surveyed by CinemaScore gave the film a grade "C" on a scale of A+ to F.

Carrie Rickey of The Philadelphia Inquirer gave the film 1.5 out of 4 stars stating that Straw Dogs "almost succeeds as an object lesson in the difference between being a man and being a macho animal. But it fails as a gripping home-invasion thriller." Michael Phillips of the Chicago Tribune called the film "a bird-brained remake" that is "miscast, barely functional in terms of technique, stupid and unnecessary" and rated it 1 out of 4 stars. Wesley Morris of The Boston Globe, wrote that watching Straw Dogs was like "being waterboarded by liberals outside a Democratic National Committee event."

Roger Ebert of the Chicago Sun-Times had reviewed the original version back in 1971. He gave the 2011 film 2 out of a possible 4 stars, and states "This new version of Straw Dogs is a reasonably close adaptation of the 1971 film by Sam Peckinpah. Change the location from England to Mississippi, change a mathematician into a screenwriter, keep the bear trap and the cat found strangled, and it tells the same story. It is every bit as violent. I found it visceral, disturbing and well-made", and said he preferred it to the original.

Elizabeth Weitzman of the New York Daily News was also favorable towards the film, giving it 4 out of 5 stars, declaring that "while Lurie could have gone lighter on the symbolism, he ratchets up the tension with deft intelligence. He's not just making a thriller but a horror film, and we feel his own fear in every scene".

== See also ==
- List of films featuring home invasions
