= Spenserian stanza =

Verse form created by Edmund Spenser

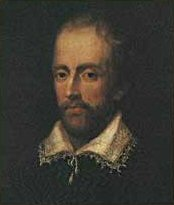
Edmund Spenser

The Spenserian stanza is a fixed verse form invented by Edmund Spenser for his epic poem The Faerie Queene (1590–96). Each stanza contains nine lines in total: eight lines in iambic pentameter followed by a single 'alexandrine' line in iambic hexameter. The rhyme scheme of these lines is$\mathrm{ABABBCBCC}$.

== Example stanza ==
This example is the first stanza from Spenser's Faerie Queene. The formatting, wherein all lines but the first and last are indented, is the same as in contemporary printed editions.

Lo I the man, whose Muse whilome did maske,
As time her taught, in lowly Shepheards weeds,
Am now enforst a far unfitter taske,
For trumpets sterne to chaunge mine Oaten reeds,
And sing of Knights and Ladies gentle deeds;
Whose prayses having slept in silence long,
Me, all too meane, the sacred Muse areeds
To blazon broad emongst her learned throng:
Fierce warres and faithfull loues shall moralize my song.

== Possible influences ==
Spenser's invention may have been influenced by the Italian form ottava rima, which consists of eight lines of iambic pentameter with the rhyme scheme $\mathrm{ABABABCC}$. This form was used by Spenser's Italian role models Ludovico Ariosto and Torquato Tasso.

Another possible influence is rhyme royal, a traditional medieval form used by Geoffrey Chaucer and others, which has seven lines of iambic pentameter that rhyme $\mathrm{ABABBCC}$.

The most likely influence, however, is the eight-line ballad stanza with the rhyme scheme $\mathrm{ABABBCBC}$, which Chaucer used in his Monk's Tale. Spenser would have been familiar with this rhyme scheme and simply added a line to the stanza, forming $\mathrm{ABABBCBCC}$.

== Use by others ==
Spenser's verse form fell into disuse in the period immediately following his death. However, it was revived in the nineteenth century by several notable poets, including:

- Mary Tighe in Psyche or the Legend of Love
- Gerard Manley Hopkins in The Escorial (1860)
- Robert Southey in A Tale of Paraguay
- Lord Byron in Childe Harold's Pilgrimage
- James Hogg in Mador of the Moor
- John Keats in The Eve of St. Agnes and Imitation of Spenser
- Percy Bysshe Shelley in The Revolt of Islam and Adonais
- Sir Walter Scott in The Vision of Don Roderick.
- Robert Burns in "The Cotter's Saturday Night", which shows his ability to use English forms while praising Scotland.
- William Wordsworth in "The Female Vagrant", included in Wordsworth and Coleridge's Lyrical Ballads
- Alfred, Lord Tennyson in The Lotos-Eaters, in the first part of the poem.
- John Clare in The Harvest Morning and November
- George Washington Moon in Elijah the Prophet
- John Frederick Rowbotham in The Epic of London
- John Neihardt in The Divine Enchantment
- William Cullen Bryant in The Ages
- Sibella Elizabeth Miles in The Wanderer of Scandinavia; or, Sweden Delivered

In Eastern Europe, English stanzaic forms were not at first very popular, these countries being too far from England's literary influence. Neither rhyme royal nor the Spenserian stanza occurred frequently. English rhyme schemes remained unknown until the early 19th century, when Lord Byron's poems gained enormous popularity. In Poland the Spenserian stanza was used by Juliusz Słowacki and Jan Kasprowicz. In Czech literature Jaroslav Vrchlický wrote some poems in the Spenserian stanza, among others Stvoření světa (The Creation of the World):

Chaos! Chaos! — Kdo postihne ty látky,
jež v bezbarvé tu leží ve směsici,
kde asi plyne základ země matky,
kde lávy proud a skály ku měsíci,
kde prvky světla v ohon vlasatici?
Chaos, chaos... jen tma a tma kol čirá,
obrovské světy ve hlubinách spící,
kde stěžeje, na nichž se země vzpírá,
kde oheň věčný jest, jejž ve svém nitru svírá?

— Lines 1-9
Translation:

Chaos! Chaos! Who discerns elements
All cast in hueless compound out of sight?
Where are the pillars of the continents,
The lava flows, alps nearing lunar height,
The sparks that make the comet's tresses bright?
Chaos! Chaos! Darkness in sable dressed,
Titanic worlds, asleep in depths of night —
Where is the axle for the Earth's swift rest?
Where the eternal fire within the planet's breast?

== Similar forms ==
In the long poem The Forest Sanctuary, Felicia Hemans employs a similar nine-line stanza, rhyming $\mathrm{ABABCCBDD}$, with the first eight lines in iambic pentameter and the ninth an alexandrine.

== Bibliography ==
- Morton, Edward Payson. "The Spenserian Stanza before 1700". Modern Philology, Volume 4, No. 4, April 1907. pp. 639–654
