= The Vision of Don Roderick =

Poem by Walter Scott

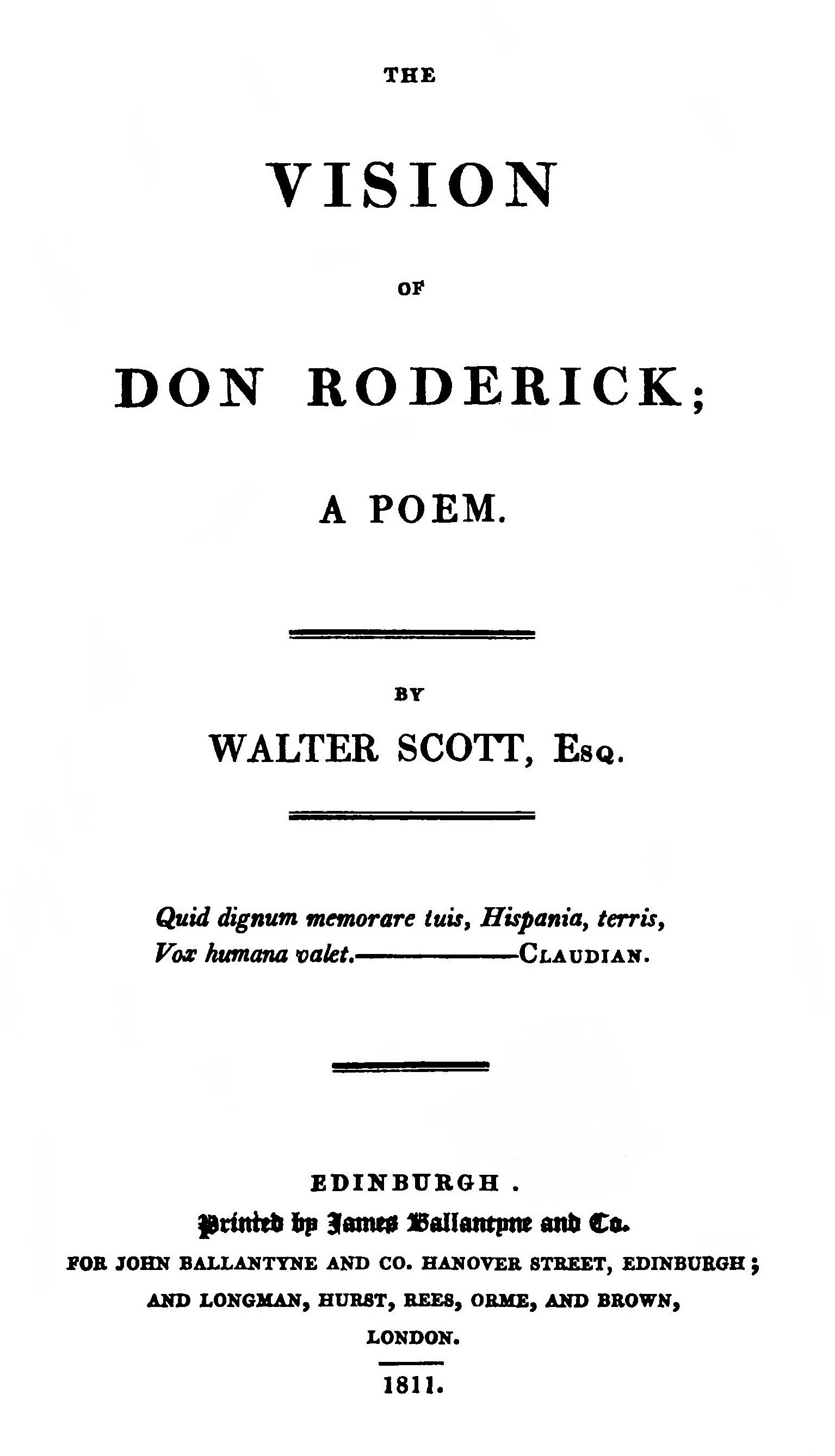
First edition title page

The Vision of Don Roderick is a poem in Spenserian stanzas by Sir Walter Scott, published in 1811. It celebrated the recent victories of the Duke of Wellington during the Peninsular War, and proceeds of its sale were to raise funds for Portugal.

== Background ==
The Vision of Don Roderick is based on an account given by Ginés Pérez de Hita of a legendary consultation of an oracle by the last Visigothic King of Spain, Roderic, around 711: this had been a favourite of Scott's since his boyhood when he had based a four-book poem, The Conquest of Granada, on it. On 30 April 1811 Scott wrote from Ashiestiel to Lady Abercorn that he had retired to the country to compose a poem in aid of "the suffering Portuguese", and that James Ballantyne and his brother had generously promised him a hundred guineas (£105). A week later he was busy with the composition and planned on completion to send the manuscript to William Erskine for vetting before it was printed. On 12 May he was able to inform James Ballantyne: "A great deal of the poem is finishd at least in dead colours as the painters say for it wants much touching", and the correction was almost complete by the 25th. Overall, Scott seems to have found the task of composition rather burdensome.

== Summary ==
Don Roderick, camped outside of Toledo, ponders the outcome of his campaign against the Moors. After confession, he demands that the prelate lead him to a certain sealed chamber, known to be enchanted, which according to legend would reveal the future — but only to the "last" King of Spain.

When the chamber is opened, the king and prelate find themselves in a vast marble hall, with two giant bronze statues standing on either side. The left-hand giant carries a scythe and an hourglass, and the right-hand giant carries a mace. The hourglass runs out almost immediately after their entrance, and the other giant turns and demolishes the far wall with his mace, revealing a magic panorama.

The panorama depicts various phases in the future of Spain: first, the conquest by the Moors; second, the Spanish Inquisition; third, the conquest by Napoleon I of France, and the arrival of British forces to liberate the country. Such sweep fits with Scott's political agenda.

== Editions ==
The Vision of Don Roderick was published on 2 July 1811 in Edinburgh by John Ballantyne and Co., and later in the month in London by Longman, Hurst, Rees, Orme, and Brown. The price was 15s (75p). A second edition with the same date was published on 1 January 1812 in Edinburgh, and two further editions appeared in 1815 and 1821.

A critical edition is due to appear in Volume 5 of The Edinburgh Edition of Walter Scott's Poetry published by Edinburgh University Press.

== Reception ==
Don Roderick was generally reckoned greatly inferior to its predecessors by most reviewers. Francis Jeffrey in The Edinburgh Review is typical with his verdict that Scott 'has fewer new images than in his other poetry,—his tone is less natural and varied,—and he moves, upon the whole, with a slower and more laborious pace'. The general conception of the poem was regarded as unfortunate, though there was some praise for Scott's aim to produce an elevated national work.
