= Straw Dogs (1971 film) =

Thriller film by Sam Peckinpah

- Theatrical release poster
- Directed by: Sam Peckinpah
- Screenplay by: David Zelag Goodman; Sam Peckinpah
- Based on: The Siege of Trencher's Farm (1969 novel) by Gordon M. Williams
- Produced by: Daniel Melnick
- Starring: Dustin Hoffman; Susan George
- Cinematography: John Coquillon
- Edited by: Paul Davies; Tony Lawson; Roger Spottiswoode
- Music by: Jerry Fielding
- Production companies: ABC Pictures; Talent Associates; Amerbroco Films
- Distributed by: Cinerama Releasing Corporation (US and UK); 20th Century Fox (International)
- Release dates: November 1971 (UK); 22 December 1971 (Los Angeles)
- Running time: 117 minutes 112 minutes (Edited cut)
- Countries: United States; United Kingdom
- Language: English
- Budget: $2.2 million or £1 million or $3.2 million
- Box office: $8 million (rentals)

Straw Dogs is a 1971 psychological thriller film directed by Sam Peckinpah and starring Dustin Hoffman and Susan George. The screenplay, by Peckinpah and David Zelag Goodman, is based on Gordon M. Williams's 1969 novel, The Siege of Trencher's Farm. The film's title is derived from a discussion in the Tao Te Ching that likens people to the ancient Chinese ceremonial straw dog, being of ceremonial worth, but afterwards discarded with indifference.

The film is noted for its violent concluding sequences and two complicated rape scenes, which were censored by numerous film rating boards. Released theatrically the same year as A Clockwork Orange, The French Connection and Dirty Harry, the film sparked heated controversy over a perceived increase of violence in films generally.

The film premiered in the UK in November 1971. Although controversial at the time, Straw Dogs is considered by some critics to be one of Peckinpah's greatest films, and was nominated for an Academy Award for Best Music (Original Dramatic Score). A remake directed by Rod Lurie and starring James Marsden and Kate Bosworth was released on 16 September 2011.

== Plot ==
After securing a research grant to study stellar structures, American applied mathematician David Sumner moves with his wife Amy to a house near her home village of Wakely on the Cornish moorland. Amy's ex-boyfriend Charlie Venner, along with his friends Norman Scutt, Chris Cawsey and Phil Riddaway, immediately resent the fact that an apparently meek outsider has married one of their own. Scutt, a former convict, confides in Cawsey his envy of Venner's past relationship with Amy. David meets Venner's uncle, Tom Hedden, a violent drunkard whose teenage daughter Janice flirts with Henry Niles, a mentally deficient man despised by the entire town.

The Sumners have taken an isolated farmhouse, Trenchers Farm, that once belonged to Amy's father. They hire Scutt and Cawsey to re-roof its garage, and when impatient with lack of progress add Venner and his cousin Bobby to the workforce. Tensions in their marriage soon become apparent. Amy criticises David's condescension toward her and suggests that cowardice was his true reason for leaving a volatile, politicized university campus in America. David withdraws deeper into his studies, ignoring both the hostility of the locals and Amy's dissatisfaction. His aloofness results in Amy's attention-gathering pranks and provocative demeanor toward the workmen, particularly Venner. David also struggles to be accepted by the educated locals, as seen in conversations with the vicar Reverend Barney Hood and his wife and Major John Scott, who is the local magistrate.

When David finds their cat hanging dead in their bedroom, Amy believes that Cawsey or Scutt is responsible. She presses David to confront the workmen, but he is too intimidated. The men invite David to go hunting; they take him to the moor and leave him there with the promise of driving birds toward him. With David away from home, Venner goes to Trenchers Farm and rapes Amy. During the assault, she sometimes appears to welcome his embrace. Scutt enters silently, motions Venner at gunpoint to move away, and rapes Amy, with Venner reluctantly holding her down. David returns much later, smarting from the men abandoning him. Amy says nothing about the rape, apart from a cryptic comment that escapes his attention.

David fires the workmen for their slow progress. Later, the Sumners attend a church social evening where Amy becomes distraught on seeing her rapists. Janice invites Henry to leave with her, and in a building hidden away from the crowd, she begins to seduce him. When Janice's brother notices she is missing, he is sent to search for her, and as he calls out for her, Henry panics and accidentally suffocates Janice while trying to keep her quiet. The Sumners leave the social early, driving through thick fog, and accidentally hit Henry as he is escaping the scene. They take the injured Henry to their home and phone the pub to report the accident. The locals, who, in the meantime, have learned that Janice was last seen with Henry, are thereby alerted to his whereabouts. Soon, Hedden, Scutt, Venner, Cawsey and Riddaway are drunkenly pounding on the Sumners' door. Deducing their intention to lynch Henry, David refuses to let them take him, despite Amy's pleas. The standoff seems to unlock a territorial instinct in David: "I will not allow violence against this house."

Magistrate Scott arrives to defuse the situation, but is accidentally shot dead by Hedden during a struggle. Realising the danger to him in witnessing this killing, David improvises various traps and weapons to fend off the attackers. He inadvertently forces Hedden to shoot himself in the foot, knocks Riddaway unconscious, and then bludgeons Cawsey to death with a poker. Venner holds him at gunpoint, but Amy's screams alert both men when Scutt assaults her again. Scutt suggests Venner join him in another rape, but Venner shoots him dead. David disarms Venner and, in the ensuing fight, snaps his neck with a mantrap. Reviewing the resulting carnage and surprised by his own violence, David mutters to himself, "Jesus, I got 'em all". A recovering Riddaway brutally attacks him, but is shot by Amy.

David gets into his car to drive Henry back to the village. Henry says he does not know his way home; David says he does not either.

== Cast ==
- Dustin Hoffman as David Sumner
- Susan George as Amy Sumner
- Peter Vaughan as Tom Hedden
- T. P. McKenna as Major John Scott
- Del Henney as Charlie Venner
- Jim Norton as Chris Cawsey
- Donald Webster as Phil Riddaway
- Ken Hutchison as Norman Scutt
- Len Jones as Bobby Hedden
- Sally Thomsett as Janice Hedden
- Robert Keegan as Harry Ware
- Peter Arne as John Niles
- Cherina Schaer as Louise Hood
- Colin Welland as Reverend Barney Hood

Uncredited

- David Warner as Henry Niles
- Michael Mundell as Bertie Hedden
- June Brown as Mrs Hedden
- Chloe Franks as Emma Hedden

== Production ==
Sam Peckinpah's two previous films, The Wild Bunch and The Ballad of Cable Hogue, had been made for Warner Bros.-Seven Arts. His connection with the company ended after the chaotic filming of The Ballad of Cable Hogue wrapped 19 days over schedule and $3 million over budget (equivalent to $19 million in 2025). Left with a limited number of directing jobs, Peckinpah was forced to travel to England to direct Straw Dogs. Produced by Daniel Melnick, who previously worked with Peckinpah on his 1966 television film Noon Wine, the screenplay began from Gordon Williams' novel, The Siege of Trencher's Farm, with Peckinpah saying, "David Goodman and I sat down and tried to make something of validity out of this rotten book. We did. The only thing we kept was the siege itself."

Finance came from ABC Pictures.

=== Casting ===
Beau Bridges, Stacy Keach, Sidney Poitier, Jack Nicholson and Donald Sutherland were considered for the lead role of David Sumner before Dustin Hoffman was cast. Hoffman agreed to do the film because he was intrigued by the character, a pacifist unaware of his feelings and potential for violence that were the same feelings he abhorred in society. Judy Geeson, Jacqueline Bisset, Diana Rigg, Helen Mirren, Carol White, Charlotte Rampling and Hayley Mills were considered for the role of Amy before Susan George was finally selected. Hoffman disagreed with the casting, as he felt his character would never marry such a "Lolita-ish" kind of girl. Peckinpah insisted on George, a relatively unknown actress in the U.S. at that time.

=== Filming ===
Location shooting took place around St Buryan, near Penzance in Cornwall, including at St Buryan's Church. Interiors were shot at Twickenham Studios in London. The exterior shots for the siege scenes were filmed during night shoots in Cornwall, while the interior shots for the same scenes were filmed in London. The film's production design was by Ray Simm.

== Reception ==
=== Box office ===
The film earned rentals of $4.5 million in North America, and $3.5 million in other countries. By 1973, it had recorded an overall profit of $1,425,000.

By 1983 the film earned $11,148,828.

=== Critical response ===
The Monthly Film Bulletin wrote: "Peckinpah is able to dispense with extraneous fantasy – no supernaturalism, no dream sequence – and instead set a tone of meticulous realism which relies on the recurrence of vindictive incident, escalating from the comic to the sinister to the shocking, to create a mounting air of menace. But if Peckinpah has dispensed with explicit fantasy, he none the less employs several techniques to unsettle the spectator's hold on 'reason'; most notably, swift cross-cutting between simultaneous but geographically separate incidents to suggest some causal relationship between them and link them in the same plot momentum. ... Equally dramatic is Dustin Hoffman's gradual mutation from his comic, bookish Graduate persona to the white-faced fanatic of the climax. His role is another variant on a formula – the little man with reserves of heroism in a crisis. ... Straw Dogs promises to emerge as a classic of the horror film and an indispensable Peckinpah masterpiece."

Roger Ebert of The Chicago Sun-Times gave the film 2 stars out of 4, and described the film as "a major disappointment in which Peckinpah's theories about violence seem to have regressed to a sort of 19th-Century mixture of Kipling and machismo."

Vincent Canby of The New York Times called it "a special disappointment" that is "an intelligent movie, but interesting only in the context of his other works".

Variety wrote, "The script (from Gordon M. Williams' novel The Siege of Trencher's Farm) relies on shock and violence to tide it over weakness in development, shallow characterization and lack of motivation."

Gary Arnold of The Washington Post wrote, "People who are sensitive to both the sight and the implications of violence will probably be disgusted and angered by Straw Dogs because there is no credible motivation for the violence. For the first time Peckinpah really seems to be specializing in violence rather than exploring its effects and meanings ... I would have walked out of Straw Dogs at several points if I'd been anything but a professional critic."

Other reviews were positive. Paul D. Zimmerman of Newsweek stated, "It is hard to imagine that Sam Peckinpah will ever make a better movie than Straw Dogs. It flawlessly expresses his primitive vision of violence — his belief that manhood requires rites of violence, that home and hearth are inviolate and must be defended by blood, that a man must conquer other men to prove his courage and hold on to his woman."

Gene Siskel of the Chicago Tribune gave the film 3 stars out of 4, and wrote that, even though he disagreed with Peckinpah's apparent worldview that "Man is an animal, and his passion for destroying his own kind lies just beneath his skin," it was nevertheless "a superbly made movie. Peckinpah creates a mood of impending violence with great skill."

Charles Champlin of the Los Angeles Times called it "an overpowering piece of storytelling, certain to remind every viewer of the wells of primal emotion lurking within himself, beneath the fragile veneer of civilized control. It is, I think, a better picture than The Wild Bunch, less ritualistic and less appallingly graphic in its violence, and in fact less cynical."

Among later assessments, Entertainment Weekly wrote in 1997 that the contemporary interpretation was that of a "serious exploration of humanity's ambivalent relationship with the dark side", but it now seems an "exploitation bloodbath".

Nick Schager of Slant Magazine rated it four stars out of four, and wrote, "Sitting through Peckinpah's controversial classic is not unlike watching a lit fuse make its slow, inexorable way toward its combustible destination — the taut build-up is as shocking and vicious as its fiery conclusion is inevitable."

Philip Martin of the Arkansas Democrat-Gazette wrote, "Peckinpah's Straw Dogs is a movie that has remained important to me for 40 years. Along with Stanley Kubrick's A Clockwork Orange, Straw Dogs stands as a transgressively violent, deeply '70s film; one that still retains its power to shock after all these years."

Rotten Tomatoes, a review aggregator, reports that 82% of 45 surveyed critics gave the film a positive review. The consensus reads: "A violent, provocative meditation on manhood, Straw Dogs is viscerally impactful — and decidedly not for the squeamish." Metacritic, which uses a weighted average, assigned the film a score of 75 out of 100, based on 11 critics, indicating "generally favorable" reviews.

=== Accolades ===
The original score by Jerry Fielding was nominated at the 44th Academy Awards in 1971 for Best Music (Original Dramatic Score), his second nomination for a Sam Peckinpah film, following The Wild Bunch in 1969.

== Controversy ==
The film was controversial on its 1971 release, mostly because of the prolonged rape scene that is the film's centerpiece. Critics accused Peckinpah of glamorizing and eroticising rape, and of engaging in misogynistic sadism and male chauvinism. They were especially disturbed by the scene's intended ambiguity — after initially resisting, Amy appears to enjoy parts of the first rape, kissing and holding her attacker, although she later has traumatic flashbacks. Author Melanie Williams, in her 2005 book, Secrets and Laws: Collected Essays in Law, Lives and Literature, stated, "The enactment purposely catered to entrenched appetites for desired victim behavior and reinforces rape myths." Another criticism is that all the main female characters depict straight women as perverse, in that every appearance of Janice and Amy is used to highlight excessive sexuality.

The violence provoked strong reactions, many critics seeing it an endorsement of violence as redemption, and the film as fascist celebration of violence and vigilantism. Others see it as anti-violence, describing the bleak ending consequent to the violence. Dustin Hoffman viewed David as deliberately, yet subconsciously, provoking the violence, his concluding homicidal rampage being the emergence of his true self. This view was not shared by director Sam Peckinpah.

In a 2026 memoir, Hoffman admitted that he had blind spots and agreed with critics that there was inherent misogyny in the film.

== Censorship ==
The studio edited the first rape scene before releasing the film in the United States, to earn an R rating from the MPAA.

In the United Kingdom, the British Board of Film Classification banned it, in accordance with the newly introduced Video Recordings Act. The film had been released theatrically in the United Kingdom, with the uncut version gaining an X rating in 1971, and the slightly cut U.S. R-rated print being rated '18' in 1995. In March 1999, a partially edited print of Straw Dogs that removed most of the second rape was refused a video certificate when the distributor lost the rights to the film after agreeing to make the requested BBFC cuts, and the full uncut version was also rejected for video three months later, on the grounds that the BBFC could not pass the uncut version so soon after rejecting a cut one.

On 1 July 2002, Straw Dogs was released unedited on VHS and DVD. This version was uncut, and therefore included the second rape scene, which showed, in the BBFC's opinion, "Amy is clearly demonstrated not to enjoy the act of violation". The BBFC wrote:

The cuts made for American distribution, which were made to reduce the duration of the sequence, therefore tended paradoxically to compound the difficulty with the first rape, leaving the audience with the impression that Amy enjoyed the experience. The Board took the view in 1999 that the pre-cut version eroticised the rape and therefore raised concerns with the Video Recordings Act about promoting harmful activity. The version considered in 2002 is substantially the original uncut version of the film, restoring much of the unambiguously unpleasant second rape. The ambiguity of the first rape is given context by the second rape, which now makes it quite clear that sexual assault is not something that Amy ultimately welcomes.

== Remake ==
In 2011, there was a remake of the film, which relocated the story to Mississippi, and changed the lead male's profession from mathematician to screenwriter. It was directed by Rod Lurie and starred James Marsden and Kate Bosworth.

== Influence ==
- Home Alone production designer John Muto identified that film as a "kids version of Straw Dogs".
- Director Jacques Audiard cited Straw Dogs as the basis for his 2015 film Dheepan.

== See also ==
- List of American films of 1971
- List of cult films
- List of films about mathematicians
- List of films featuring home invasions
- The Last House on the Left

== Sources ==
- Hayes, Kevin J. (2008). Sam Peckinpah: Interviews. Jackson, Mississippi: Univ. Press of Mississippi. ISBN 978-1-934-110645.
- Simmons, Garner (1982). Peckinpah, A Portrait in Montage. Austin, Texas: University of Texas Press. ISBN 0-292-76493-6.
- Weddle, David (1994). If They Move...Kill 'Em!. New York City: Grove Press. ISBN 0-8021-3776-8.
- Williams, Melanie (2005). Secrets and Laws: Collected Essays Law, Lives and Literature. Abingdon, England: Psychology Press. ISBN 1-84472-018-7.
