= Billy Sinclair (footballer) =

Scottish footballer

Personal information
- Full name: Scott William Inglis Sinclair
- Date of birth: 21 March 1947 (age 79)
- Place of birth: Glasgow, Scotland
- Height: 1.71 m (5 ft 7 in)
- Position: Wing-half

Youth career
- Riverside Juveniles
- Greenock Morton

Senior career*
| Years | Team | Apps | (Gls) |
| 1964–1966 | Chelsea | 1 | (0) |
| 1966–1967 | Glentoran | | |
| 1967 | → Detroit Cougars | 10 | (0) |
| 1968–1969 | Kilmarnock | 10 | (0) |
| 1969–1970 | Glentoran | | |
- Linfield
- Club Marconi
| 1975–1978 | Sligo Rovers | | |

Managerial career
- 1975–1979: Sligo Rovers (player-manager)
- 1979–1980: Glenavon
- 1985–1992: Cliftonville
- * Club domestic league appearances and goals

Scott William Inglis "Billy" Sinclair (born 21 March 1943) is a Scottish former professional footballer who played as an wing-half.

== Club career ==
Sinclair started his career with Greenock Morton before moving to English side Chelsea in 1964. Having only made one appearance for Chelsea, he moved to Northern Ireland to sign for Glentoran. Due to an arrangement between Glentoran and American side Detroit Cougars, Sinclair played ten games in the 1967 United Soccer Association season.

He returned to his native Scotland in 1968, spending one season with Kilmarnock, where he made ten appearances, before a return to Glentoran the following season. He had a spell with Linfield before moving to Australia to play for Club Marconi. His last club was Sligo Rovers, before going into management.

== Coaching career ==
While at Sligo Rovers, Sinclair assumed the position of player-manager, before briefly managing Glenavon. He also managed Cliftonville between 1985 and 1992.

== Personal life ==
Sinclair was diagnosed with Alzheimer's disease in 2020. His son has spoken out about the treatment of ex-footballers, and has called for better welfare support, as well as the disease to be treated as an industrial injury.

== Honours ==
Glentoran

- Irish League: 1966–67, 1969–70

Sligo Rovers

- League of Ireland: 1976–77

Individual

- Malcolm Brodie Lifetime Achievement Award: 2021
