= The Siege of Trencher's Farm =

1969 novel by Gordon Williams

The Siege of Trencher's Farm Republished as Straw Dogs
- First edition
- Author: Gordon Williams
- Language: English
- Genre: Horror, crime
- Set in: Cornwall
- Publisher: Secker & Warburg
- Publication date: 1969
- Publication place: United Kingdom
- Pages: 225
- ISBN: 978-0-85768-119-5
- OCLC: 682893422

The Siege of Trencher's Farm (1969) is a psychological horror/thriller novel by Scottish author Gordon Williams. It was first published by Secker & Warburg, and is better known for the 1971 film adaptation Straw Dogs (starring Dustin Hoffman) by Sam Peckinpah. A 2011 remake of that film under the same name was made to less favourable reviews, both films bearing little resemblance to the novel. The Siege of Trencher's Farm was republished by Titan Books as in 2011 as Straw Dogs, to coincide with the release of the remake.

== Plot ==
George Magruder, an American professor of English from Philadelphia, moves with his British wife Louise and their eight-year-old daughter Karen to Trencher's Farm in the town of Dando, Cornwall, England, so that George can finish a book he is writing about the (fictitious) 18th-century diarist Branksheer, "a complete man". George and Louise are having marital troubles, causing Louise to become frustrated and, though he wants to, George has difficulty in relating to the locals at the local pub, The Inn. The locals tell Louise the story of Soldier's Field, in which locals who killed a rapist escaped justice, as none of them would talk.

In the climax of the book, child killer Henry Niles is being transported back to prison when his ambulance hits ice and crashes. Niles sees blood and flees, worried that he will be blamed, and George accidentally hits him in a snow drift with his car and takes him back to the farm, not knowing who he is. At the same time, a mentally disabled child, Janice Heddon, runs away from a Christmas party. George realises who Niles is and phones for the doctor and police, but the town is cut off to the police by the weather. The doctor was already attending to Janice's mother, and when the locals find out Janice is missing and that the child killer Niles is at Trencher's Farm, Janice's father Tom and his friends knock out the doctor and form an armed vigilante mob to break in. Bill, a community leader, arrives on scene, but is accidentally killed by the mob. Tom reminds the locals of Soldier's Field, leading them to believe that if they attack as a group none will be blamed. George has to fight them off and protect his family, changing from ordered and civilised into enraged and animalistic.

== Development history ==
The idea for the book came from the panic and sense of siege where Williams lived in Devon when "The Mad Axeman" Frank Mitchell escaped from nearby Dartmoor Prison. Williams wrote the book in nine days – "he dashed off the final page to catch the post office van" – and received £300 from the publisher.

== Reception ==
The List included the book among its "100 Best Scottish Books of all Time", dubbing it "a deliberation on how traditional masculine values find a place in modern society". Author Ian Rankin wrote that "This novel is quite different to the eventual movie version, being a complex examination of modern-day masculinity and liberal values."

Slant Magazine found that "Much of the novel's prose reads like a screenplay, with tedious descriptions of props, settings, and physical actions ... tension only really matters if you identify with the characters and care about their predicament, which I found too implausible, fantastic, and crudely sketched to do so."

Legal scholar Melanie Williams wrote of how the 1971 film had coloured reception of the book: "The book is now republished by Bloomsbury (2003), with the title Straw Dogs. This seems particularly sad given that past critical commentary on the book has been wholly unfair; so dazzled are the film critics by their icon."

== Film adaptations ==
=== 1971 film ===
Williams' agent George Greenfield had planned for Roman Polanski to direct an adaptation, but he was unavailable. For the 1971 film adaptation, writers Sam Peckinpah and David Zelag Goodman changed several aspects of the novel's story while keeping the overall plot. Peckinpah said "David Goodman and I sat down and tried to make something of validity out of this rotten book. We did. The only thing we kept was the siege itself". Williams was "horrified" by the film and publicly denounced it; he did not approve of the Americanized language or the rape scene. The List noted that "Peckinpah's film simplifies Williams' more complex plot and argument to a hideous degree." George and Louise Magruder are renamed David and Amy Sumner, and their eight-year-old daughter, Karen, does not exist in the film. The novel does not contain the controversial rape scene presented in the movie. The Daily Rotation noted that in the book "Here, there are much bigger moral questions, as most of the circumstances rely on happenstance, where a rape is never a confusion of circumstance." In the novel, none of the besiegers die. Instead, they are badly injured and face charges.

Henry Niles and Janice Hedden never meet in the book. Hedden suffers from exposure in the snow, while Niles has murdered three girls before the novel began. Janice Hedden is a mentally disabled eight-year-old girl, not a teenager with a fancy for David Sumner or Henry Niles. Charles Venner is not related to the Heddens and does not besiege the house. He is married and was never in love with Louise.

=== 2011 remake ===
For the 2011 film adaptation, writer/director Rod Lurie reused elements of Peckinpah's 1971 film, though the setting is changed from England to Mississippi. The main characters are again named David and Amy Sumner. In this adaptation the besiegers die in a variety of violent ways.

Williams received royalties for the remake.
