= Straw Dogs (band) =

- Origin: Seattle
- Genres: Country rock
- Years active: 1997–present
- Label: Crafty Records
- Members: David Von Beck; Darren Smith
- Website: Official Website

Straw Dogs is a country rock band.

== The Beginnings (Legends and Lies) ==
David von Beck formed the Straw Dogs as an outlet for his shimmering, mellow country rock.

Legends & Lies (1998) was recorded (and toured) with the band's original line-up. After touring the United States as a full band in support of the group's debut, Legends & Lies, von Beck pared Straw Dogs down to a simple duo, initiating the help of his old friend Darren Smith from the Colorado-based Stranger Neighbor. Darren Smith agreed to join his friend. After Smith joined Straw Dogs, the band has enjoyed moderate success.

== Any Place At All ==
Any Place At All was the band's first album recorded with Darren Smith. The 2001 album is often publicised and referred to as the band's debut. The songs on Any Place At All earned von Beck and Smith 4 Billboard songwriting awards and the opening slot on the Crash Test Dummies final tour. Songs from the album found its way onto AAA and college radio, and won first place in the KZOK (Seattle) talent contest. The song “All My Days” has been played over 1 million times at mp3.com.

== Hum Of The Motor ==
Hum of the Motor, a tribute to the open road and Americana was released on March 18, 2003, this time with a full band dishing out the tunes. "We've upped the ante," said David von Beck, the band's lead vocalist and guitarist, who co-wrote all of the new songs with guitarist Darren Smith. Smith also handles backing vocals, piano, and even some bass. "This record is fuller, more electric. We brought in Casey Miller on drums, Dan Tyack on pedal steel and some other great players, so it has added some depth to the Straw Dogs sound."

The Straw Dogs' "second album (Legends and Lies is overlooked by the band as their first album) was a harder sell than Any Place At All.

== Tell The Rising Sun ==
"Tell the Rising Sun", is the band's 2005 release. The song "Not Gone" was in top rotation in Belgium. Listeners to The Mountain, 103.7 FM (Seattle) also hear tracks from the album quite often. For instance, "Troubles Down" gets regular airplay on The Mountain's Sunday Brunch. Numerous internet radio stations also broadcast the CD, including Live365, CelticRadio, Buzz Music, GarageRadio, and altcountry.nl, where the "Not Gone" was in the station's "Top 20" for January 2006.

Their song, "Guess Again," was featured in an upcoming Warren Miller Film, entitled, Hunt. They were also asked to write a song for another upcoming production entitled, Trial By Self. The song is entitled, "When Heaven Falls."

== Live Shows ==
As a four-piece rock outfit, Straw Dogs consistently put on live shows.

In longer shows, Darren and David add an acoustic set, which gives the audience a chance to hear just voice and guitar, the root tones and clean harmony that drive this band's compositions. There are also occasional guest musicians in the line-up, including on keyboards, pedal steel, and dobro.

== More About David von Beck ==
Straw Dogs founder David von Beck is also a plaintiff's construction-defect lawyer with Levy-von Beck and Associates. He is married to Marcie, who is an architect who traded in her 12-year career to teach fifth grade. They have 2 daughters.

== Other Interesting Information ==
Straw Dogs' latest record, "Love and then Hope," was released in March 2009. The band's label, Crafty Records, has also released Darren Smith's solo album entitled, "Last Drive."

== Awards ==
- 2007 Unisong Song Contest (Honorable Mention - "When Heaven Falls")
- 2006 Unisong Song Contest (Double finalists - "Amelia" and "When She Was Good")
- 2005 Jeff Buckley Tribute (Chicago): Showcase artist
- 2004 SongOfTheYear Contest: Honorable Mention (“Mostly Alone”)
- 2004 CMT.com – NSAI Contest: Honorable Mention (“Pains of Arkansas”)
- 2003 USA Songwriting Contest - Finalists
- Winners, KZOK (Seattle) Talent Search (national showcase in Las Vegas)
- 2002 Billboard Song Contest: Two “Honorable Mention” Awards
- 2000 World Music Awards: Fourth Place ("All My Days")
- 2000 Billboard Song Contest: Two “Honorable Mention” Awards

== Discography ==
- Legends and Lies (1998)[with different line-up]
- Any Place at All (2000)
- Hum of the Motor (2003)
- Tell the Rising Sun (2005)
- Love and then Hope (2009)
- No Dividing Line (2013)
