= Joe Fascione =

Scottish footballer (1945–2019)

Personal information
- Full name: Joseph Victor Fascione
- Date of birth: 5 February 1945
- Place of birth: Coatbridge, Scotland
- Date of death: 5 February 2019 (aged 74)
- Position: Winger

Youth career
- 1959–1961: Burnbank United

Senior career*
Years	Team	Apps	(Gls)
1961–1962	Kirkintilloch Rob Roy		
1962–1969	Chelsea	29	(1)
1969–1971	Durban City		
1972	Dundee United	0	(0)
1972	Barnet	34	(1)
- Romford
- Barking

Managerial career
- Barking
- 1993–94: Croydon
- * Club domestic league appearances and goals

Joseph Victor Fascione (5 February 1945 – 5 February 2019) was a Scottish footballer who played as a winger.

== Career ==
A right-sided winger, Fascione started out with Scottish junior side Kirkintilloch Rob Roy where he won the Scottish Junior Cup in 1962 – believed to be the youngest player to do so – before being signed for Londoners Chelsea by Tommy Docherty in September of that year. Fascione would remain with the club until 1969, but the presence of fellow wingers Bert Murray and Charlie Cooke ensured that he featured only sporadically in the first team, making a total of just 34 appearances. He was, however, one of the eight players infamously sent home by Docherty for breaking a pre-match curfew in Blackpool in April 1965.

Upon leaving Chelsea he signed for Durban City F.C. in South Africa in the summer of 1969. He returned to the UK in late 1971, but because of problems with the release of his registration from South Africa he was unable to sign for a club until July 1972. He then joined Dundee United on a trial basis but was released shortly afterwards, having only appeared in pre-season friendly matches.

He subsequently had spells with Romford in the Southern League, and Barking. He also had a stint as manager of the latter club.

He died on 5 February 2019, his 74th birthday.
