= Gordon Williams (writer) =

Scottish author (1934–2017)

- Born: Gordon Maclean Williams; 20 June 1934; Paisley, Renfrewshire, UK
- Died: 20 August 2017 (aged 83); London, En
- Other names: P. B. Yuill (with Terry Venables); Jack Lang
- Education: John Neilson Institution
- Occupation: Writer
- Notable work: From Scenes Like These (1968); The Siege of Trencher's Farm (1969)

Gordon Maclean Williams (20 June 1934 – 20 August 2017) was a Scottish author of more than 20 novels. Notable among his books is From Scenes Like These, shortlisted for the 1969 Booker Prize, and The Siege of Trencher's Farm, which was adapted for the controversial Sam Peckinpah film, Straw Dogs. Williams was a scriptwriter for films adapted from his own novels as well as for books by other authors.

He also worked as a ghostwriter for the autobiographies of footballers Bobby Moore and Terry Venables as well as manager Tommy Docherty. Williams collaborated with Terry Venables, using the shared pseudonym P. B. Yuill, to co-write four novels and create the 1978 television series Hazell.

== Early life and education ==
Born in Paisley, Renfrewshire, in Scotland, Gordon Williams was the son of a police constable who had moved south from Aberdeenshire. He was educated at the John Neilson Institution, leaving the day before his 17th birthday to become a cub reporter for the Johnstone Advertiser and Paisley Pictorial.

== Career ==
Following national service with the Royal Air Force (RAF) in Germany, he returned to journalism. He worked with the Johnstone Advertiser, then joined the Poole and Dorset Herald, before moving to the South London Advertiser, also doing stints at some magazines, and going on to write novels, as well as writing for television.

His first novel, The Last Day of Lincoln Charles, was published in 1965, followed in 1966 by The Camp, which was informed by his experiences in the RAF. He was the author of several other novels, including The Man Who Had Power Over Women (1967), From Scenes Like These (1968), which was shortlisted for the Booker Prize in 1969, The Upper Pleasure Garden (1970), Walk, Don't Walk (1972) and Big Morning Blues (1974).

Williams was a ghostwriter for the autobiographies of association footballers Bobby Moore, Terry Venables and manager Tommy Docherty.

In 1971, Williams' novel The Siege of Trencher's Farm was controversially filmed as Straw Dogs. Sam Peckinpah's cinematic treatment marked a watershed in the depiction of sexual violence in the cinema, although the film's most controversial scenes are absent from the book. Other film work includes The Man Who Had Power Over Women, from his own novel, and Tree of Hands, as scriptwriter from a Ruth Rendell novel. Williams also wrote the book of Ridley Scott's 1977 historical drama film The Duellists.

In 1976, film producer Harry Saltzman employed Williams to rewrite the script for The Micronauts. Although the film was never made, Williams' novelisation was published in 1977; he subsequently wrote two sequels.

While working as commercial manager of association football club Chelsea, he renewed his collaboration with Venables, resulting in four co-written novels. From the novels grew the 1978 TV series Hazell, which the pair co-wrote under the shared pseudonym P. B. Yuill. Under the name Jack Lang, Williams also wrote paperbacks "for £300 a time".

His novels The Camp, From Scenes Like These and Walk, Don't Walk were reissued by Allison and Busby in 1980, when they were described by in a review by Ian Hamilton in the London Review of Books as being "among the most genuine and entertaining British fiction to have appeared in the last couple of decades." On 2003, From Scenes Like These was called "one of the greatest novels of the postwar era" by D. J. Taylor.

Williams declined director Bill Forsyth's invitation to write the script for the 1981 film Gregory's Girl.

In 1983, Pomeroy, an American Diplomat would become the last novel by Williams to be published. Asked in 2003 why he stopped writing novels, Williams replied: "I got bored."

== Death ==
Williams died in London on 20 August 2017 at the age of 83.

== Bibliography ==
=== Non-fiction ===
- A Hundred Years of Protest and Progress, official history of the London Trades Council, 1860–1960, 1960
- Acker Bilk, biography; May Fair Books, 1962

=== Novels ===
- The Last Day of Lincoln Charles; London: Secker & Warburg, 1965; New York: Stein & Day, 1966
- The Camp; London: Secker & Warburg, 1966; Allison & Busby, 1980
- The Man Who Had Power Over Women; London: Secker & Warburg, 1967; New York: Stein & Day, 1967
- The Hard Case (as Jack Lang); Mayflower, 1968
- From Scenes Like These; London: Secker & Warburg, 1968; New York: William Morrow, 1969; London: Allison & Busby, 1980 (in Growing up in the West, Canongate, 2003)
- The Biter (as Jack Lang); Mayflower, 1968
- The Siege of Trencher's Farm (filmed as Straw Dogs); London: Secker & Warburg, 1969; New York: William Morrow, 1969
- The Upper Pleasure Garden; London: Secker & Warburg, 1970; New York: William Morrow, 1970
- Walk, Don't Walk; London: Quartet, 1973, Allison & Busby, 1980; New York: St. Martin's Press, 1972
- The Bornless Keeper (as P. B. Yuill); Macmillan, 1974
- Big Morning Blues; London: Hodder & Stoughton, 1974
- The Duellists (novelisation of Ridley Scott film based on screenplay by Gerald Vaughan-Hughes); London: Fontana, 1977
- Pomeroy, an American Diplomat; London: Michael Joseph, 1983

=== With Terry Venables ===
- They Used to Play on Grass; London: Odhams, 1972
- Hazell Plays Solomon (as P. B. Yuill); Penguin, 1977
- Hazell and the Three Card Trick (as P. B. Yuill); Penguin, 1977
- Hazell and the Menacing Jester (as P. B. Yuill); Penguin, 1977

=== Ghosted ===
- The Book of Soccer, edited by Bobby Moore;
- Denis Law's Book of Soccer;
- The Book of Soccer (Bobby Moore);
- My Soccer Story by Bobby Moore (autobiography);
- Thirteen Against the Bank, by Norman Leigh; Penguin, 1977

=== Science fiction ===
- The Micronauts: New English Library, 1977; Bantam Books, August 1977
- The Microcolony: Bantam Books, 1979; U.K. title: Micronaut World; New English Library, June 1981
- Revolt of the Micronauts: Bantam Books, 1981; New English Library, 1981

=== Contributor ===
- "The Horseshoe Inn", in Prevailing Spirits: A Book of Scottish Ghost Stories (Giles Gordon, ed.): Hamish Hamilton, 1976
