= Bert Murray =

English footballer

Personal information
- Full name: Albert George Murray
- Date of birth: 22 September 1942 (age 84)
- Place of birth: Hoxton, London, England
- Positions: Full back; winger

Youth career
- Chelsea

Senior career*
Years	Team	Apps	(Gls)
1961–1966	Chelsea	160	(39)
1966–1971	Birmingham City	132	(22)
1971–1973	Brighton & Hove Albion	102	(25)
1973–1976	Peterborough United	123	(10)
Total		515	(96)

International career
1964–1965	England U23	6	(1)
- * Club domestic league appearances and goals

Albert George Murray (born 22 September 1942) is an English former footballer who played as a winger. He played more than 100 games in the Football League for each of his four clubs, namely Chelsea, Birmingham City, Brighton & Hove Albion and Peterborough United. He won six caps for England at under-23 level.

Murray started his career with Chelsea, and was an important figure in manager Tommy Docherty's "Diamonds" side of the mid-1960s, which won the League Cup in 1965 and narrowly missed out on FA Cup and League success. He made 183 appearances for Chelsea, scoring 44 goals.

Murray, along with several teammates, fell out with Docherty and was transferred to Birmingham City in 1966, where he linked up with ex-Chelsea teammate, Barry Bridges. He later played for Brighton & Hove Albion and Peterborough United.

He went on to run the Everads Bull pub, a sixteenth century coaching in on the market square (now carpark) in Market Deeping, south Lincolnshire.

== Honours ==
Chelsea

- Football League Cup: 1964–65
