= 1968–69 Northampton Town F.C. season =

Northampton Town
1968–69 season
- Chairman: Bob Brett
- Manager: Ron Flowers
- Stadium: County Ground
- Division Three: 14th
- FA Cup: Third round
- League Cup: First round
- Top goalscorer: League: John Fairbrother (13); All: John Fairbrother (14)
- Highest home attendance: 15,161 vs Luton Town
- Lowest home attendance: 4,406 vs Crewe Alexandra
- Average home league attendance: 6,790

The 1968–69 season was Northampton Town's 72nd season in their history and their second successive season in the Third Division. Alongside competing in Division Three, the club also participated in the FA Cup and League Cup.

== Players ==
As of match played 29 April 1969.

Name	Position	Nat.	Place of Birth	Date of Birth (Age)	Apps	Goals	Previous club	Date signed	Fee
Goalkeepers
Roger Barron	GK	(England)	Northampton	30 June 1947 (aged 21)	19	0	Apprentice	July 1965	N/Ars
Gordon Morritt	GK	(England)	Rotherham	8 February 1949 (aged 20)	37	0	Doncaster Rovers	August 1968	
Defenders
John Clarke	CB	(England)	Northampton	23 October 1945 (aged 23)	36	0	Apprentice	July 1965	N/A
Ray Fairfax	FB	(England)	Smethwick	14 November 1941 (aged 27)	48	0	West Bromwich Albion	July 1968	
John Mackin	RB	(Scotland)	Bellshill	18 November 1943 (aged 25)	112	13	Apprentice	November 1963	N/A
Phil Neal	U	(England)	Irchester	20 February 1951 (aged 18)	22	4	Apprentice	July 1968	N/A
Frank Rankmore	CB	(Wales)	Cardiff	21 July 1939 (aged 29)	38	5	Peterborough United	August 1968	£12,000
John Roberts	U	(Wales)	Abercynon	11 September 1946 (aged 22)	67	13	Swansea Town	November 1967	£13,000
Neil Townsend	CB	(England)	Long Buckby	1 February 1950 (aged 19)	21	0	Apprentice	September 1968	N/A
Clive Walker	LB	(England)	Watford	24 October 1945 (aged 23)	80	1	Leicester City	October 1966	
Midfielders
John Byrne	CM	(Scotland)	Cambuslang	20 May 1939 (aged 29)	44	4	Peterborough United	December 1967	£9,000
Graham Felton	W	(England)	Cambridge	1 March 1949 (aged 20)	60	2	Apprentice	September 1966	N/A
Ron Flowers	CM	(England)	Edlington	28 July 1934 (aged 34)	67	4	Wolverhampton Wanderers	August 1967	
Peter Hawkins	LW	(Wales)	Swansea	9 November 1951 (aged 17)	7	1	Apprentice	July 1968	N/A
Joe Kiernan	CM	(Scotland)	Coatbridge	22 October 1942 (aged 26)	209	10	Sunderland	July 1963	
Tommy Knox	W	(Scotland)	Glasgow	5 September 1939 (aged 29)	33	1	Mansfield Town	November 1967	
Barry Lines	W	(England)	Bletchley	16 May 1942 (aged 26)	281	50	Bletchley Town	September 1960	
John McGleish	CM	(Scotland)	Airdrie	18 December 1951 (aged 17)	0	0	Apprentice	November 1968	N/A
Eric Weaver	W	(Wales)	Rhymney	1 July 1943 (aged 25)	50	9	Notts County	December 1967	
Forwards
Dennis Brown	IF	(England)	Reading	8 February 1944 (aged 25)	48	11	Swindon Town	February 1967	£5,000 P/E
John Fairbrother	CF	(England)	Cricklewood	12 February 1941 (aged 28)	53	19	Peterborough United	February 1968	
Bob Hatton	CF	(England)	Kingston upon Hull	10 April 1947 (aged 22)	36	8	Bolton Wanderers	October 1968	

== Competitions ==
=== Division Three ===
==== League table ====
Pos	Team	Pld	W	D	L	GF	GA	GAv	Pts	Promotion or relegation
19	Barrow	46	17	8	21	56	75	0.747	42	
20	Gillingham	46	13	15	18	54	63	0.857	41	
21	Northampton Town (R)	46	14	12	20	54	61	0.885	40	Relegation to the Fourth Division
22	Hartlepool (R)	46	10	19	17	40	70	0.571	39	Relegation to the Fourth Division
23	Crewe Alexandra (R)	46	13	9	24	52	76	0.684	35	Relegation to the Fourth Division

Source: rsssf.com
Rules for classification: 1) points; 2) goal average; 3) number of goals scored.
(R) Relegated

==== Results summary ====
Overall								Home						Away					
Pld	W	D	L	GF	GA	GAv	Pts	W	D	L	GF	GA	Pts	W	D	L	GF	GA	Pts
46	14	12	20	54	61	0.885	40	9	8	6	37	30	26	5	4	14	17	31	14

Last updated: 5 February 2024.

==== League position by match ====
Round	1	2	3	4	5	6	7	8	9	10	11	12	13	14	15	16	17	18	19	20	21	22	23	24	25	26	27	28	29	30	31	32	33	34	35	36	37	38	39	40	41	42	43	44	45	46
Ground	A	H	A	H	H	A	H	H	A	H	A	H	A	H	H	A	A	H	H	A	H	A	H	A	H	A	A	H	H	H	A	A	H	H	A	H	A	A	A	H	H	A	A	H	A	A
Result	L	D	W	L	W	D	D	D	W	W	L	W	L	D	L	W	D	L	W	D	W	L	L	L	D	W	L	W	D	D	L	W	W	W	L	W	L	L	L	D	L	L	L	L	L	D
Position	20	22	18	19	16	16	15	16	11	9	11	12	12	12	15	12	12	12	11	11	10	10	12	14	14	11	13	9	11	11	11	10	9	8	9	10	10	10	12	12	13	14	15	16	19	21

Source: 11v11.com
A = Away; H = Home; W = Win; D = Draw; L = Loss

==== Matches ====
Win Draw Loss

16 August 1968 1	Reading	1–0	Northampton Town	Reading
19:30 BST				Stadium: Elm Park; Attendance: 7,515

27 August 1968 2	Northampton Town	1–1	Stockport County	Northampton
19:30 BST	o.g.'			Stadium: County Ground; Attendance: 9,622

31 August 1968 3	Walsall	0–1	Northampton Town	Walsall
19:30 BST			B.Lines	Stadium: Fellows Park; Attendance: 7,768

7 September 1968 4	Northampton Town	1–3	Bournemouth & Boscombe Athletic	Northampton
15:00 BST	J.Fairbrother			Stadium: County Ground; Attendance: 7,812

10 September 1968 5	Northampton Town	2–0	Watford	Northampton
19:30 BST	J.Roberts			Stadium: County Ground; Attendance: 6,824

14 September 1968 6	Crewe Alexandra	2–2	Northampton Town	Crewe
15:00 BST			R.Flowers; J.Fairbrother	Stadium: Gresty Road; Attendance: 5,386

17 September 1968 7	Northampton Town	2–2	Bristol Rovers	Northampton
19:30 BST	J.Fairbrother; B.Lines			Stadium: County Ground; Attendance: 8,002

21 September 1968 8	Northampton Town	0–0	Hartlepool United	Northampton
15:00 BST				Stadium: County Ground; Attendance: 6,749

28 September 1968 9	Plymouth Argyle	0–1	Northampton Town	Plymouth
15:00 BST			B.Lines	Stadium: Home Park; Attendance: 10,505

5 October 1968 10	Northampton Town	1–0	Rotherham United	Northampton
15:00 BST	J.Fairbrother			Stadium: County Ground; Attendance: 8,602

7 October 1968 11	Stockport County	1–0	Northampton Town	Stockport
19:30 BST				Stadium: Edgeley Park; Attendance: 7,979

19 October 1968 12	Northampton Town	2–1	Tranmere Rovers	Northampton
15:00 BST	B.Hatton			Stadium: County Ground; Attendance: 7,359

26 October 1968 13	Luton Town	2–1	Northampton Town	Luton
15:00 BST			J.Fairbrother	Stadium: Kenilworth Road; Attendance: 17,818

2 November 1968 14	Northampton Town	1–1	Torquay United	Northampton
15:00 BST	J.Fairbrother			Stadium: County Ground; Attendance: 7,279

5 November 1968 15	Northampton Town	0–1	Gillingham	Northampton
19:30 BST				Stadium: County Ground; Attendance: 5,545

9 November 1968 16	Mansfield Town	0–2	Northampton Town	Mansfield
15:00 BST			J.Fairbrother; J.Byrne	Stadium: Field Mill; Attendance: 4,635

23 November 1968 17	Brighton & Hove Albion	1–1	Northampton Town	Hove
15:00 BST			F.Rankmore	Stadium: Goldstone Ground; Attendance: 6,813

26 November 1968 18	Northampton Town	2–6	Swindon Town	Northampton
19:30 BST	J.Roberts 16'; B.Hatton 57'	Report	J.Smith 28'; D.Rogers 40', 82'; R.Smart 55'; D.Heath 56'; P.Noble 75'	Stadium: County Ground; Attendance: 6,827; Referee: Bill Castle

30 November 1968 19	Northampton Town	3–1	Barnsley	Northampton
15:00 BST	F.Rankmore; R.Flowers; J.Fairbrother			Stadium: County Ground; Attendance: 6,195

9 December 1968 20	Orient	0–0	Northampton Town	Leyton, London
19:30 BST				Stadium: Brisbane Road; Attendance: 3,240
Note: Fixture was previously postponed twice, first on October 12, 1968 and then on October 28, 1968.

14 December 1968 21	Northampton Town	4–1	Orient	Northampton
15:00 BST	C.Walker; F.Rankmore; J.Fairbrother; G.Felton			Stadium: County Ground; Attendance: 5,405

20 December 1968 22	Tranmere Rovers	2–1	Northampton Town	Birkenhead
19:30 BST			F.Rankmore	Stadium: Prenton Park; Attendance: 4,502

28 December 1968 23	Northampton Town	0–2	Luton Town	Northampton
15:00 BST				Stadium: County Ground; Attendance: 15,161

11 January 1969 24	Torquay United	2–0	Northampton Town	Torquay
19:30 BST				Stadium: Plainmoor; Attendance: 7,570

18 January 1969 25	Northampton Town	0–0	Mansfield Town	Northampton
15:00 BST				Stadium: County Ground; Attendance: 5,840

21 January 1969 26	Rotherham United	0–1	Northampton Town	Rotherham
19:30 BST			E.Weaver	Stadium: Millmoor; Attendance: 7,570
Note: Fixture was previously postponed on December 26, 1968.

25 January 1969 27	Gillingham	2–0	Northampton Town	Gillingham
15:00 BST				Stadium: Priestfield; Attendance: 4,532

28 January 1969 28	Northampton Town	4–0	Barrow	Northampton
19:30 BST	E.Weaver; D.Brown; B.Hatton; P.Hawkins			Stadium: County Ground; Attendance: 5,375

22 February 1969 29	Northampton Town	1–1	Oldham Athletic	Northampton
15:00 BST	B.Hatton			Stadium: County Ground; Attendance: 5,419

25 February 1969 30	Northampton Town	1–1	Brighton & Hove Albion	Northampton
15:00 BST	E.Weaver			Stadium: County Ground; Attendance: 4,554

1 March 1969 31	Swindon Town	1–0	Northampton Town	Swindon
15:00 BST	D.Rogers 62'	Report		Stadium: County Ground; Attendance: 17,281; Referee: Brian Daniels

3 March 1969 32	Barrow	0–2	Northampton Town	Barrow-in-Furness
19:15 BST			D.Brown; B.Hatton	Stadium: Holker Street; Attendance: 2,919

8 March 1969 33	Northampton Town	4–2	Reading	Northampton
15:00 BST	J.Fairbrother; J.Roberts			Stadium: County Ground; Attendance: 6,072

11 March 1969 34	Northampton Town	1–0	Southport	Northampton
19:30 BST	P.Neal			Stadium: County Ground; Attendance: 5,534

14 March 1969 35	Watford	3–0	Northampton Town	Watford
19:30 BST				Stadium: Vicarage Road; Attendance: 16,549

22 March 1969 36	Northampton Town	3–1	Walsall	Northampton
15:00 BST	D.Brown; J.Roberts; P.Neal			Stadium: County Ground; Attendance: 5,763

26 March 1969 37	Southport	2–0	Northampton Town	Southport
19:30 BST				Stadium: Haig Avenue; Attendance: 3,248
Note: Fixture was previously postponed on February 1, 1969.

29 March 1969 38	Bournemouth & Boscombe Athletic	3–2	Northampton Town	Bournemouth
19:30 BST			P.Neal; B.Hatton	Stadium: Dean Court; Attendance: 5,089

4 April 1969 39	Bristol Rovers	2–1	Northampton Town	Bristol
15:00 BST			E.Weaver	Stadium: Eastville Stadium; Attendance: 9,424

5 April 1969 40	Northampton Town	1–1	Plymouth Argyle	Northampton
15:00 BST	J.Roberts			Stadium: County Ground; Attendance: 6,306

8 April 1969 41	Northampton Town	3–4	Shrewsbury Town	Northampton
19:30 BST	F.Rankmore; J.Roberts; P.Neal			Stadium: County Ground; Attendance: 5,521

11 April 1969 42	Hartlepool	3–0	Northampton Town	Hartlepool
19:30 BST				Stadium: Victoria Park; Attendance: 3,729

16 April 1969 43	Shrewsbury Town	1–0	Northampton Town	Shrewsbury
19:30 BST				Stadium: Gay Meadow; Attendance: 6,770

19 April 1969 44	Northampton Town	0–1	Crewe Alexandra	Northampton
15:00 BST				Stadium: County Ground; Attendance: 4,406

25 April 1969 45	Barnsley	2–1	Northampton Town	Barnsley
19:30 BST			J.Fairbrother	Stadium: Oakwell; Attendance: 7,640

29 April 1969 46	Oldham Athletic	1–1	Northampton Town	Oldham
19:30 BST			o.g.'	Stadium: Boundary Park; Attendance: 2,073
Note: Fixture was previously abandoned on March 18, 1969 after 55 minutes due to bad weather with Northampton winning 1–0.

=== FA Cup ===
16 November 1968 First round	Northampton Town	3–1	Margate	Northampton
15:00 BST	J.Fairbrother; J.Roberts			Stadium: County Ground; Attendance: 7,672

7 December 1968 Second round	Brighton & Hove Albion	1–2	Northampton Town	Hove
15:00 BST			B.Hatton; N.Townsend	Stadium: Goldstone Ground; Attendance: 8,839

4 January 1969 Third round	Bolton Wanderers	2–1	Northampton Town	Bolton
15:00 BST			T.Knox	Stadium: Burnden Park; Attendance: 12,632

=== League Cup ===
14 August 1968 First round	Crewe Alexandra	1–1	Northampton Town	Crewe
19:30 BST			D.Brown	Stadium: Gresty Road; Attendance: 5,105

21 August 1968 First round (r)	Crewe Alexandra	1–0	Northampton Town	Crewe
19:30 BST				Stadium: Gresty Road; Attendance: 5,502

=== Appearances and goals ===
Pos	Player	Division Three			FA Cup			League Cup			Total		
Pos	Player	Starts	Sub	Goals	Starts	Sub	Goals	Starts	Sub	Goals	Starts	Sub	Goals
GK	Roger Barron	11	–	–	–	–	–	2	–	–	13	–	–
GK	Gordon Morritt	34	–	–	3	–	–	–	–	–	37	–	–
DF	John Clarke	29	–	–	1	–	–	2	–	–	32	–	–
DF	Ray Fairfax	43	–	–	3	–	–	2	–	–	–	–	–
DF	John Mackin	15	2	–	2	–	–	–	–	–	17	2	–
DF	Phil Neal	21	–	4	1	–	–	–	–	–	22	–	4
DF	Frank Rankmore	33	–	5	3	–	–	2	–	–	38	–	5
DF	John Roberts	38	–	7	3	–	2	1	–	–	42	–	9
DF	Neil Townsend	18	2	–	1	–	1	–	–	–	19	2	1
DF	Clive Walker	26	–	1	3	–	–	–	–	–	29	–	1
MF	John Byrne	18	–	1	2	–	–	2	–	–	22	–	1
MF	Graham Felton	24	–	1	1	–	–	–	–	–	25	–	1
MF	Ron Flowers	21	1	2	1	–	–	1	–	–	23	1	2
MF	Peter Hawkins	6	1	1	–	–	–	–	–	–	6	1	1
MF	Joe Kiernan	21	–	–	1	–	–	–	–	–	22	–	–
MF	Barry Lines	20	2	3	1	–	–	–	1	–	21	3	3
MF	Tommy Knox	12	2	–	1	–	1	2	–	–	15	2	1
MF	John McGleish	–	–	–	–	–	–	–	–	–	–	–	–
MF	Eric Weaver	24	–	4	1	–	–	2	–	–	27	–	4
FW	Dennis Brown	20	4	3	–	–	–	2	–	1	22	4	4
FW	John Fairbrother	30	2	13	2	1	1	2	–	–	34	3	14
FW	Bob Hatton	29	4	7	3	–	1	–	–	–	32	4	8
Players who left before end of season:
GK	Stuart Skeet	1	–	–	–	–	–	–	–	–	1	–	–
