= 1967–68 Northampton Town F.C. season =

Northampton Town
1967–68 season
- Chairman: Ted Buller
- Manager: Dave Bowen (until September); Tony Marchi
- Stadium: County Ground
- Division Three: 17th
- FA Cup: First round
- League Cup: Third round
- Top goalscorer: League: Don Martin (12); All: Don Martin (13)
- Highest home attendance: 12,625 vs Reading
- Lowest home attendance: 6,387 vs Southport
- Average home league attendance: 8,937

The 1967–68 season was Northampton Town's 71st season in their history and the first season back in the Third Division, following relegation from the Second Division the previous season. Alongside competing in Division Three, the club also participated in the FA Cup and League Cup.

== Players ==
As of match played 4 May 1968.

Name	Position	Nat.	Place of birth	Date of birth (age)	Apps	Goals	Previous club	Date signed	Fee
Goalkeepers
Roger Barron	GK	(England)	Northampton	30 June 1947 (aged 20)	6	0	Apprentice	July 1965	N/A
John Brooks	GK	(England)	London	23 August 1947 (aged 20)	1	0	Ipswich Town	October 1967	Free
Bryan Harvey	GK	(England)	Stepney	26 August 1938 (aged 29)	181	0	Blackpool	October 1963	£4,000
Full backs
Brian Faulkes	FB	(England)	Abingdon	10 April 1945 (aged 23)	45	2	Reading	August 1967	
John Mackin	RB	(Scotland)	Bellshill	18 November 1943 (aged 24)	93	12	Apprentice	November 1963	N/A
Clive Walker	LB	(England)	Watford	24 October 1945 (aged 22)	51	0	Leicester City	October 1966	
Half backs
John Clarke	CH	(England)	Northampton	23 October 1945 (aged 22)	4	0	Apprentice	July 1965	N/A
John Roberts	CH	(Wales)	Abercynon	11 September 1946 (aged 21)	25	4	Swansea Town	November 1967	£13,000
Graham Carr	HB	(England)	Corbridge	25 October 1944 (aged 23)	96	0	Apprentice	August 1962	N/A
Ron Flowers	HB	(England)	Edlington	28 July 1934 (aged 33)	43	2	Wolverhampton Wanderers	August 1967	
Joe Kiernan	WH	(Scotland)	Coatbridge	22 October 1942 (aged 25)	187	10	Sunderland	July 1963	
John Kurila	WH	(Scotland)	Glasgow	10 April 1941 (aged 27)	162	4	Bristol City	November 1963	
Inside/Outside forwards
Graham Felton	OF	(England)	Cambridge	1 March 1949 (aged 19)	35	1	Cambridge United	August 1966	
Barry Lines	OF	(England)	Bletchley	16 May 1942 (aged 25)	257	47	Bletchley Town	September 1960	
Tommy Knox	OF	(Scotland)	Glasgow	5 September 1939 (aged 28)	16	0	Mansfield Town	November 1967	
Eric Weaver	OF	(Wales)	Rhymney	1 July 1943 (aged 24)	23	5	Notts County	December 1967	
Dennis Brown	IF	(England)	Reading	8 February 1944 (aged 24)	22	7	Swindon Town	February 1967	£5,000 P/E
John Byrne	IF	(Scotland)	Cambuslang	20 May 1939 (aged 28)	22	3	Peterborough United	December 1967	£9,000
Ray Price	IF	(England)	Northampton	30 November 1948 (aged 19)	7	0	Apprentice	July 1966	N/A
Centre forwards
John Fairbrother	CF	(England)	Cricklewood	12 February 1941 (aged 27)	16	5	Peterborough United	February 1968	

== Competitions ==
=== Division Three ===
==== League table ====
Pos	Team	Pld	W	D	L	GF	GA	GAv	Pts
15	Bristol Rovers	46	17	9	20	72	78	0.923	43
16	Oldham Athletic	46	18	7	21	60	65	0.923	43
17	Northampton Town	46	14	13	19	58	72	0.806	41
18	Orient	46	12	17	17	46	62	0.742	41
19	Tranmere Rovers	46	14	12	20	62	74	0.838	40

Source: rsssf.com

==== Results summary ====
Overall								Home						Away					
Pld	W	D	L	GF	GA	GAv	Pts	W	D	L	GF	GA	Pts	W	D	L	GF	GA	Pts
46	14	13	19	58	72	0.806	41	10	8	5	40	25	28	4	5	14	18	47	13

Last updated: 8 March 2022.

==== League position by match ====
Round	1	2	3	4	5	6	7	8	9	10	11	12	13	14	15	16	17	18	19	20	21	22	23	24	25	26	27	28	29	30	31	32	33	34	35	36	37	38	39	40	41	42	43	44	45	46
Ground	A	H	A	H	H	A	H	A	A	H	A	H	A	A	H	A	H	H	A	H	A	H	A	H	A	H	A	H	A	A	H	A	H	H	H	A	H	A	A	A	H	H	A	H	H	A
Result	L	W	D	D	L	L	D	L	W	W	W	W	L	W	L	L	D	W	L	W	L	D	D	L	D	W	L	D	D	L	D	D	W	L	W	L	W	L	L	L	L	D	W	W	D	L
Position	21	9	11	10	17	21	21	21	21	14	12	9	13	10	13	18	18	16	18	15	18	17	17	19	19	17	17	19	16	17	17	17	17	17	16	17	16	16	17	18	18	19	18	18	18	17

Source: 11v11.com
A = Away; H = Home; W = Win; D = Draw; L = Loss

==== Matches ====
Win Draw Loss

19 August 1967 1	Gillingham	2–0	Northampton Town	Gillingham
15:00 BST				Stadium: Priestfield Stadium; Attendance: 7,890

26 August 1967 2	Northampton Town	3–0	Grimsby Town	Northampton
15:00 BST	D.Martin; F.Large			Stadium: County Ground; Attendance: 10,206

2 September 1967 3	Torquay United	0–0	Northampton Town	Torquay
15:00 BST				Stadium: Plainmoor; Attendance: 9,449

5 September 1967 4	Northampton Town	1–1	Mansfield Town	Northampton
19:30 BST	J.Mackin			Stadium: County Ground; Attendance: 12,205

9 September 1967 5	Northampton Town	1–2	Reading	Northampton
15:00 BST	F.Large			Stadium: County Ground; Attendance: 12,625

16 September 1967 6	Swindon Town	4–0	Northampton Town	Swindon
15:00 BST	D.Rogers 14', 57'; P.Terry 25'; R.Flowers 77' (o.g.)	Report		Stadium: County Ground; Attendance: 13,280; Referee: K Markham

23 September 1967 7	Northampton Town	2–2	Shrewsbury Town	Northampton
15:00 BST	D.Martin			Stadium: County Ground; Attendance: 8,922

25 September 1967 8	Mansfield Town	3–2	Northampton Town	Mansfield
19:30 BST			F.Large; J.Hall	Stadium: Field Mill; Attendance: 5,506

30 September 1967 9	Brighton & Hove Albion	0–2	Northampton Town	Hove
15:00 BST			J.Mackin; D.Martin	Stadium: Goldstone Ground; Attendance: 13,546

3 October 1967 10	Northampton Town	2–1	Orient	Northampton
19:30 BST	B.Faulkes			Stadium: County Ground; Attendance: 8,079

7 October 1967 11	Southport	1–3	Northampton Town	Southport
15:00 BST			D.Martin; J.Hall	Stadium: Haig Avenue; Attendance: 6,052

14 October 1967 12	Northampton Town	1–0	Scunthorpe United	Northampton
15:00 BST	R.Flowers			Stadium: County Ground; Attendance: 10,097

21 October 1967 13	Oldham Athletic	2–0	Northampton Town	Oldham
15:00 BST				Stadium: Boundary Park; Attendance: 5,019

24 October 1967 14	Orient	1–3	Northampton Town	Leyton, London
19:30 BST			B.Best; F.Large	Stadium: Brisbane Road; Attendance: 4,708

28 October 1967 15	Northampton Town	4–5	Bristol Rovers	Northampton
15:00 BST	J.Mackin; F.Large			Stadium: County Ground; Attendance: 9,126

4 November 1967 16	Barrow	4–0	Northampton Town	Barrow
15:00 GMT				Stadium: Holker Street; Attendance: 5,851

11 November 1967 17	Northampton Town	1–1	Oxford United	Northampton
15:00 GMT	D.Martin			Stadium: County Ground; Attendance: 11,318

14 November 1967 18	Northampton Town	1–0	Torquay United	Northampton
19:30 GMT	D.Martin			Stadium: County Ground; Attendance: 8,475

18 November 1967 19	Bury	3–1	Northampton Town	Bury
15:00 GMT			J.Kiernan	Stadium: Gigg Lane; Attendance: 6,642

25 November 1967 20	Northampton Town	1–0	Bournemouth & Boscombe Athletic	Northampton
15:00 GMT	J.Roberts			Stadium: County Ground; Attendance: 9,042

2 December 1967 21	Colchester United	2–1	Northampton Town	Colchester
15:00 GMT			D.Martin	Stadium: Layer Road; Attendance: 3,505

16 December 1967 22	Northampton Town	1–1	Gillingham	Northampton
15:00 GMT	D.Martin			Stadium: County Ground; Attendance: 7,411

23 December 1967 23	Grimsby Town	0–0	Northampton Town	Cleethorpes
15:00 GMT				Stadium: Blundell Park; Attendance: 3,595

26 December 1967 24	Northampton Town	0–1	Tranmere Rovers	Northampton
15:00 GMT				Stadium: County Ground; Attendance: 12,367

30 December 1967 25	Tranmere Rovers	2–2	Northampton Town	Birkenhead
19:30 GMT			E.Weaver o.g.'	Stadium: Prenton Park; Attendance: 7,011

20 January 1968 26	Northampton Town	2–0	Swindon Town	Northampton
15:00 GMT	D.Martin 4'; J.Kiernan 32'	Report		Stadium: County Ground; Attendance: 10,339; Referee: Gerrard Lewis

3 February 1968 27	Shrewsbury Town	2–0	Northampton Town	Shrewsbury
15:00 GMT				Stadium: Gay Meadow; Attendance: 5,382

10 February 1968 28	Northampton Town	2–2	Brighton & Hove Albion	Northampton
15:00 GMT	E.Weaver; J.Byrne			Stadium: County Ground; Attendance: 7,882

14 February 1968 29	Reading	0–0	Northampton Town	Reading
19:30 GMT				Stadium: Elm Park; Attendance: 8,093

17 February 1968 30	Stockport County	4–0	Northampton Town	Stockport
15:00 GMT				Stadium: Edgeley Park; Attendance: 7,121

24 February 1968 31	Northampton Town	1–1	Southport	Northampton
15:00 BST	J.Byrne			Stadium: County Ground; Attendance: 6,387

2 March 1968 32	Scunthorpe United	1–1	Northampton Town	Scunthorpe
15:00 BST			D.Brown	Stadium: Old Show Ground; Attendance: 2,745

9 March 1968 33	Northampton Town	3–0	Walsall	Northampton
15:00 BST	J.Roberts; J.Fairbrother; D.Brown			Stadium: County Ground; Attendance: 8,536

16 March 1968 34	Northampton Town	1–2	Oldham Athletic	Northampton
15:00 BST	E.Weaver			Stadium: County Ground; Attendance: 7,558

19 March 1968 35	Northampton Town	4–1	Stockport County	Northampton
19:30 BST	G.Felton; J.Roberts; J.Fairbrother; D.Brown			Stadium: County Ground; Attendance: 6,536

23 March 1968 36	Bristol Rovers	2–0	Northampton Town	Bristol
15:00 BST				Stadium: Eastville Stadium; Attendance: 5,413

30 March 1968 37	Northampton Town	3–0	Barrow	Northampton
15:00 BST	J.Mackin; J.Roberts; J.Fairbrother			Stadium: County Ground; Attendance: 8,283

2 April 1968 38	Walsall	4–0	Northampton Town	Walsall
19:30 BST				Stadium: Fellows Park; Attendance: 5,552

6 April 1968 39	Oxford United	1–0	Northampton Town	Oxford
19:30 BST				Stadium: Manor Ground; Attendance: 10,150

12 April 1968 40	Watford	5–1	Northampton Town	Watford
15:00 BST			J.Mackin	Stadium: Vicarage Road; Attendance: 7,917

13 April 1968 41	Northampton Town	0–1	Bury	Northampton
15:00 BST				Stadium: County Ground; Attendance: 7,622

16 April 1968 42	Northampton Town	1–1	Watford	Northampton
19:30 BST	J.Mackin			Stadium: County Ground; Attendance: 6,732

20 April 1968 43	Bournemouth & Boscombe Athletic	0–2	Northampton Town	Bournemouth
15:00 BST			J.Fairbrother; D.Brown	Stadium: Dean Court; Attendance: 6,148

23 April 1968 44	Northampton Town	3–1	Peterborough United	Northampton
19:30 BST	E.Weaver; J.Fairbrother			Stadium: County Ground; Attendance: 8,934

27 April 1968 45	Northampton Town	2–2	Colchester United	Northampton
15:00 BST	R.Flowers; J.Byrne			Stadium: County Ground; Attendance: 6,859

4 May 1968 46	Peterborough United	4–0	Northampton Town	Peterborough
15:00 BST				Stadium: London Road; Attendance: 6,658

=== FA Cup ===
9 December 1967 First round	Bournemouth & Boscombe Athletic	2–0	Northampton Town	Bournemouth
15:00 GMT				Stadium: Dean Court; Attendance: 4,998

=== League Cup ===
23 August 1967 First round	Peterborough United	2–3	Northampton Town	Peterborough
19:30 BST			J.Kiernan; D.Martin; F.Large	Stadium: London Road; Attendance: 8,157

13 September 1967 Second round	Northampton Town	3–1	Aston Villa	Northampton
19:30 BST	J.Mackin; F.Large; J.Hall		T.Scott	Stadium: County Ground; Attendance: 11,832

11 October 1967 Third round	Northampton Town	0–0	Millwall	Northampton
19:30 BST				Stadium: County Ground; Attendance: 12,282

16 October 1967 Third round (r)	Millwall	5–1	Northampton Town	Millwall
19:30 BST			B.Best	Stadium: The Den; Attendance: 10,167

=== Appearances and goals ===
Pos	Player	Division Three			FA Cup			League Cup			Total		
Pos	Player	Starts	Sub	Goals	Starts	Sub	Goals	Starts	Sub	Goals	Starts	Sub	Goals
GK	Roger Barron	6	–	–	–	–	–	–	–	–	6	–	–
GK	John Brooks	1	–	–	–	–	–	–	–	–	1	–	–
GK	Bryan Harvey	39	–	–	1	–	–	4	–	–	44	–	–
FB	Brian Faulkes	39	1	2	1	–	–	4	–	–	44	1	2
FB	John Mackin	38	1	6	1	–	–	4	–	1	43	1	7
FB	Clive Walker	24	–	–	1	–	–	1	–	–	26	–	–
CH	John Roberts	24	–	4	1	–	–	–	–	–	25	–	4
HB	Graham Carr	36	1	–	1	–	–	4	–	–	41	1	–
HB	John Clarke	1	–	–	–	–	–	–	–	–	1	–	–
HB	Ron Flowers	40	–	2	1	–	–	2	–	–	43	–	2
HB	Joe Kiernan	37	–	2	–	1	–	4	–	1	41	1	3
HB	John Kurila	29	3	–	1	–	–	4	–	–	34	3	–
OF	Graham Felton	18	–	1	–	–	–	2	–	–	20	–	1
OF	Willie Johnston	–	1	–	–	–	–	–	–	–	–	1	–
OF	Tommy Knox	16	–	–	–	–	–	–	–	–	16	–	–
OF	Barry Lines	12	–	–	–	–	–	3	–	–	15	–	–
OF	Eric Weaver	23	–	5	–	–	–	–	–	–	23	–	5
IF	Dennis Brown	14	–	4	–	–	–	–	–	–	14	–	4
IF	John Byrne	22	–	3	–	–	–	–	–	–	22	–	3
IF	Ray Price	6	–	–	–	–	–	–	–	–	6	–	–
CF	John Fairbrother	16	–	5	–	–	–	–	–	–	16	–	5
Players who left before end of season:
OF	Billy Best	8	–	2	1	–	–	1	–	1	10	–	3
IF	Don Martin	27	–	12	1	–	–	4	–	1	32	–	13
CF	Jim Hall	17	–	2	1	–	–	3	–	1	21	–	3
CF	Frank Large	16	–	7	–	–	–	4	–	2	20	–	9
