= 1969–70 Northampton Town F.C. season =

Northampton Town
1969–70 season
- Chairman: Eric Northover
- Manager: Dave Bowen
- Stadium: County Ground
- Division Four: 14th
- FA Cup: Fifth round
- League Cup: First round
- Top goalscorer: League: John Fairbrother (23); All: John Fairbrother (25)
- Highest home attendance: 21,771 vs Manchester United
- Lowest home attendance: 2,979 vs Hartlepool United
- Average home league attendance: 5,594

The 1969–70 season was Northampton Town's 73rd season in their history and the first season back in the Fourth Division. Alongside competing in Division Four, the club also participated in the FA Cup and League Cup.

== Players ==
As of match played 27 April 1970.

Name	Position	Nat.	Place of Birth	Date of Birth (Age)	Apps	Goals	Previous club	Date signed	Fee
Goalkeepers
Kim Book	GK	(England)	Bath	12 February 1946 (aged 24)	41	0	Bournemouth & B A	July 1969	
Gary Knibbs	GK	(England)	Northampton	10 March 1951 (aged 19)	0	0	Apprentice	July 1969	N/A
Defenders
Eric Brookes	FB	(England)	Darton	3 February 1944 (aged 26)	52	1	Barnsley	July 1969	
John Clarke	CB	(England)	Northampton	23 October 1945 (aged 24)	89	0	Apprentice	July 1965	N/A
Ray Fairfax	FB	(England)	Smethwick	14 November 1941 (aged 28)	97	1	West Bromwich Albion	July 1968	
Brian Knight	U	(Scotland)	Dundee	28 March 1949 (aged 21)	13	0	Huddersfield Town	October 1969	
Phil Neal	U	(England)	Irchester	20 February 1951 (aged 19)	39	6	Apprentice	July 1968	N/A
Frank Rankmore	CB	(Wales)	Cardiff	21 July 1939 (aged 30)	93	15	Peterborough United	August 1968	£12,000
Neil Townsend	CB	(England)	Long Buckby	1 February 1950 (aged 20)	34	1	Apprentice	September 1968	N/A
Midfielders
Bernie Fagan	W	(England)	Houghton-le-Spring	29 January 1949 (aged 21)	8	0	Sunderland	July 1969	
Graham Felton	W	(England)	Cambridge	1 March 1949 (aged 21)	114	9	Apprentice	September 1966	N/A
Peter Hawkins	LW	(Wales)	Swansea	9 November 1951 (aged 18)	19	3	Apprentice	July 1968	N/A
Joe Kiernan	CM	(Scotland)	Coatbridge	22 October 1942 (aged 27)	259	13	Sunderland	July 1963	
Barry Lines	W	(England)	Bletchley	16 May 1942 (aged 27)	295	50	Bletchley Town	September 1960	
John McGleish	CM	(Scotland)	Airdrie	18 December 1951 (aged 18)	0	0	Apprentice	November 1968	N/A
Dixie McNeil	W	(England)	Melton Mowbray	16 January 1947 (aged 23)	25	8	Corby Town	May 1969	£5,000
Eric Ross	CM	(Northern Ireland)	Belfast	19 September 1944 (aged 25)	43	3	Newcastle United	August 1969	
Eric Weaver	W	(Wales)	Rhymney	1 July 1943 (aged 26)	71	9	Notts County	December 1967	
Forwards
John Fairbrother	CF	(England)	Cricklewood	12 February 1941 (aged 29)	109	44	Peterborough United	February 1968	
Frank Large	CF	(England)	Leeds	26 January 1940 (aged 30)	139	59	Fulham	August 1969	

== Competitions ==
=== Division Four ===
==== League table ====
Pos	Team	Pld	W	D	L	GF	GA	GAv	Pts
12	Scunthorpe United	46	18	10	18	67	65	1.031	46
13	York City	46	16	14	16	55	62	0.887	46
14	Northampton Town	46	16	12	18	64	55	1.164	44
15	Crewe Alexandra	46	16	12	18	51	51	1.000	44
16	Grimsby Town	46	14	15	17	54	58	0.931	43

Source: rsssf.com

==== Results summary ====
Overall								Home						Away					
Pld	W	D	L	GF	GA	GAv	Pts	W	D	L	GF	GA	Pts	W	D	L	GF	GA	Pts
46	16	12	18	64	55	1.164	44	11	7	5	41	19	29	5	5	13	23	36	15

Last updated: 2 February 2024.

==== League position by match ====
Round	1	2	3	4	5	6	7	8	9	10	11	12	13	14	15	16	17	18	19	20	21	22	23	24	25	26	27	28	29	30	31	32	33	34	35	36	37	38	39	40	41	42	43	44	45	46
Ground	A	A	H	H	A	H	A	A	H	H	A	A	H	A	H	H	A	H	H	H	A	H	H	A	A	H	H	A	H	H	H	A	A	H	A	A	A	H	H	A	A	H	H	A	A	A
Result	L	L	D	D	D	D	L	L	W	W	W	L	L	L	W	W	D	L	D	D	D	L	W	D	W	W	W	L	L	W	W	L	L	W	L	L	D	L	D	W	W	W	D	W	L	L
Position	24	23	23	24	24	24	24	24	22	17	15	17	19	22	20	17	16	16	16	16	16	18	17	15	16	14	15	15	16	14	14	14	14	14	14	15	15	15	17	17	13	13	13	13	14	14

Source: 11v11.com
A = Away; H = Home; W = Win; D = Draw; L = Loss

==== Matches ====
Win Draw Loss

9 August 1969 1	Crewe Alexandra	2–0	Northampton Town	Crewe
15:00 BST				Stadium: Gresty Road; Attendance: 3,813

23 August 1969 2	Port Vale	4–1	Northampton Town	Burslem
15:00 BST	J.Green; K.Wookey; B.Gough; E.Magee		G.Felton	Stadium: Vale Park; Attendance: 4,809

26 August 1969 3	Northampton Town	0–0	Oldham Athletic	Northampton
19:30 BST				Stadium: County Ground; Attendance: 6,357

30 August 1969 4	Northampton Town	1–1	Lincoln City	Northampton
15:00 BST	P.Neal			Stadium: County Ground; Attendance: 6,026

6 September 1969 5	Hartlepool United	1–1	Northampton Town	Hartlepool
15:00 BST			J.Fairbrother	Stadium: Victoria Park; Attendance: 3,090

13 September 1969 6	Northampton Town	1–1	Darlington	Northampton
15:00 BST	P.Hawkins			Stadium: County Ground; Attendance: 4,922

17 September 1969 7	Peterborough	1–0	Northampton Town	Peterborough
19:30 BST				Stadium: London Road; Attendance: 8,557

20 September 1969 8	Swansea Town	3–2	Northampton Town	Swansea, Wales
15:15 BST			P.Hawkins; N.Townsend	Stadium: Vetch Field; Attendance: 6,660

27 September 1969 9	Northampton Town	4–1	Newport County	Northampton
15:00 BST	J.Fairbrother; G.Felton; F.Large		T.Cooper	Stadium: County Ground; Attendance: 4,665

30 September 1969 10	Northampton Town	3–1	Notts County	Northampton
19:30 BST	J.Kiernan; F.Large; F.Rankmore			Stadium: County Ground; Attendance: 6,609

4 October 1969 11	Bradford (Park Avenue)	1–2	Northampton Town	Bradford
15:00 BST			J.Fairbrother; F.Large	Stadium: Park Avenue; Attendance: 2,555

8 October 1969 12	Workington	2–0	Northampton Town	Workington
19:15 BST				Stadium: Borough Park; Attendance: 1,738

11 October 1969 13	Northampton Town	0–1	Wrexham	Northampton
15:00 BST				Stadium: County Ground; Attendance: 6,994

18 October 1969 14	Aldershot	5–2	Northampton Town	Aldershot
15:00 BST			G.Felton; F.Rankmore	Stadium: Recreation Ground; Attendance: 5,747

25 October 1969 15	Northampton Town	2–0	Southend United	Northampton
15:00 BST	G.Felton; F.Rankmore			Stadium: County Ground; Attendance: 5,154

28 October 1969 16	Northampton Town	3–0	Workington	Northampton
19:30 BST	J.Fairbrother; F.Large			Stadium: County Ground; Attendance: 6,243

1 November 1969 17	York City	1–1	Northampton Town	York
15:00 BST			J.Fairbrother	Stadium: Bootham Crescent; Attendance: 4,808

8 November 1969 18	Northampton Town	0–1	Chester	Northampton
15:00 BST			A.Tarbuck	Stadium: County Ground; Attendance: 5,659

22 November 1969 19	Northampton Town	1–1	Brentford	Northampton
15:00 BST	J.Fairbrother		G.Dobson	Stadium: County Ground; Attendance: 5,315

25 November 1969 20	Northampton Town	1–1	Colchester United	Northampton
19:30 BST	J.Kiernan 9'	Report	M.Brown 27'	Stadium: County Ground; Attendance: 3,256; Referee: R Weedon

13 December 1969 21	Darlington	2–2	Northampton Town	Darlington
15:00 BST			J.Fairbrother	Stadium: Feethams; Attendance: 2,063

20 December 1969 22	Northampton Town	0–1	Hartlepool United	Northampton
15:00 BST				Stadium: County Ground; Attendance: 2,979

26 December 1969 23	Northampton Town	2–0	Port Vale	Northampton
15:00 BST	F.Rankmore			Stadium: County Ground; Attendance: 7,522

27 December 1969 24	Lincoln City	0–0	Northampton Town	Lincoln
15:00 BST				Stadium: Sincil Bank; Attendance: 7,866

17 January 1970 25	Newport County	0–2	Northampton Town	Newport, Wales
15:00 BST			J.Fairbrother	Stadium: Somerton Park; Attendance: 2,280

31 January 1970 26	Northampton Town	3–0	Bradford (Park Avenue)	Northampton
15:00 BST	R.Fairfax; D.McNeil; F.Rankmore			Stadium: County Ground; Attendance: 12,972

18 February 1970 27	Northampton Town	2–1	Scunthorpe United	Northampton
19:30 BST	J.Fairbrother; F.Large			Stadium: County Ground; Attendance: 3,635
Note: Fixture was previously postponed on February 2, 1970.

21 February 1970 28	Chester	2–1	Northampton Town	Chester
15:15 BST	D.Draper; J.Clarke o.g.'		E.Ross	Stadium: Sealand Road; Attendance: 3,782

23 February 1970 29	Northampton Town	1–2	Crewe Alexandra	Northampton
19:30 BST	F.Rankmore			Stadium: County Ground; Attendance: 5,315
Note: Fixture was previously postponed on February 14, 1970.

28 February 1970 30	Northampton Town	4–0	Aldershot	Northampton
15:00 BST	J.Fairbrother; F.Large; E.Ross			Stadium: County Ground; Attendance: 4,833

2 March 1970 31	Northampton Town	2–0	Exeter City	Northampton
19:30 BST	G.Felton; F.Large			Stadium: County Ground; Attendance: 4,974

7 March 1970 32	Brentford	1–0	Northampton Town	Brentford, London
15:15 BST	A.Cocks			Stadium: Griffin Park; Attendance: 7,292

9 March 1970 33	Chesterfield	2–1	Northampton Town	Chesterfield
19:30 BST			D.McNeil	Stadium: Saltergate; Attendance: 9,624

14 March 1970 34	Northampton Town	3–1	Grimsby Town	Northampton
15:00 BST	J.Fairbrother; J.Kiernan; D.McNeil			Stadium: County Ground; Attendance: 4,537

17 March 1970 35	Scunthorpe United	1–0	Northampton Town	Scunthorpe
19:30 BST				Stadium: Old Show Ground; Attendance: 3,090

21 March 1970 36	Exeter City	1–0	Northampton Town	Exeter
15:00 BST				Stadium: St James Park; Attendance: 4,981

27 March 1970 37	Southend United	2–2	Northampton Town	Southend-on-Sea
15:00 BST			J.Fairbrother	Stadium: Roots Hall; Attendance: 6,359

28 March 1970 38	Northampton Town	0–1	Chesterfield	Northampton
15:00 BST				Stadium: County Ground; Attendance: 5,740

31 March 1970 39	Northampton Town	2–2	York City	Northampton
19:30 BST	E.Brookes; J.Fairbrother			Stadium: County Ground; Attendance: 4,128

4 April 1970 40	Oldham Athletic	0–2	Northampton Town	Oldham
15:15 BST			J.Fairbrother	Stadium: Boundary Park; Attendance: 5,774

6 April 1970 41	Colchester United	0–3	Northampton Town	Colchester
19:30 BST		Report	D.McNeil 24', 43', 50'	Stadium: Layer Road; Attendance: 3,776; Referee: L Sinkins

10 April 1970 42	Northampton Town	4–1	Swansea Town	Northampton
19:30 BST	J.Fairbrother; G.Felton; F.Large			Stadium: County Ground; Attendance: 4,104
Note: Fixture was previously postponed on January 10, 1970.

14 April 1970 43	Northampton Town	2–2	Peterborough United	Northampton
19:30 BST	J.Fairbrother			Stadium: County Ground; Attendance: 6,732

18 April 1970 44	Grimsby Town	0–1	Northampton Town	Cleethorpes
15:00 BST			J.Fairbrother	Stadium: Blundell Park; Attendance: 3,445
Note: Fixture was previously postponed on November 29, 1969.

24 April 1970 45	Notts County	2–0	Northampton Town	Nottingham
19:30 BST				Stadium: Meadow Lane; Attendance: 2,456

27 April 1970 46	Wrexham	3–0	Northampton Town	Wrexham, Wales
19:15 BST				Stadium: Racecourse Ground; Attendance: 9,965

=== FA Cup ===
15 November 1969 First round	Northampton Town	0–0	Weymouth	Northampton
15:00 BST				Stadium: County Ground; Attendance: 5,005

19 November 1969 First round (r)	Weymouth	1–3	Northampton Town	Weymouth
19:30 BST			F.Rankmore; J.Fairbrother	Stadium: Recreation Ground; Attendance: 4,500

6 December 1969 Second round	Northampton Town	1–1	Exeter City	Northampton
15:00 BST	P.Neal			Stadium: County Ground; Attendance: 5,227

9 December 1969 Second round (r)	Exeter City	0–0 (a.e.t.)	Northampton Town	Exeter
19:30 BST				Stadium: St James Park; Attendance: 8,930

15 December 1969 Second round (r2)	Exeter City	1–2	Northampton Town	Swindon
19:30 BST			F.Large; D.McNeil	Stadium: County Ground; Attendance: 2,494; Referee: David Smith

12 January 1970 Third round	Brentwood	0–1	Northampton Town	Brentwood
15:00 BST			J.Fairbrother	Stadium: Ongar Road; Attendance: 5,320

24 January 1970 Fourth round	Tranmere Rovers	0–0	Northampton Town	Birkenhead
15:00 BST				Stadium: Prenton Park; Attendance: 7,590

27 January 1970 Fourth round (r)	Northampton Town	2–1	Tranmere Rovers	Northampton
19:30 BST	F.Rankmore; G.Felton			Stadium: County Ground; Attendance: 16,142

7 February 1970 Fifth round	Northampton Town	2–8	Manchester United	Northampton
15:00 BST	F.Large; D.McNeil		G.Best; B.Kidd	Stadium: County Ground; Attendance: 21,771; Referee: Peter Baldwin

=== League Cup ===
13 August 1969 First round	Oxford United	2–0	Northampton Town	Oxford
19:30 BST				Stadium: Manor Ground; Attendance: 7,158

=== Appearances and goals ===
Pos	Player	Division Four			FA Cup			League Cup			Total		
Pos	Player	Starts	Sub	Goals	Starts	Sub	Goals	Starts	Sub	Goals	Starts	Sub	Goals
GK	Kim Book	32	–	–	9	–	–	–	–	–	41	–	–
GK	Gary Knibbs	–	–	–	–	–	–	–	–	–	–	–	–
DF	Eric Brookes	42	–	1	7	2	–	1	–	–	50	2	1
DF	John Clarke	44	–	–	9	–	–	–	–	–	53	–	–
DF	Ray Fairfax	39	–	1	9	–	–	1	–	–	49	–	1
DF	Brian Knight	9	3	–	1	–	–	–	–	–	10	3	–
DF	Phil Neal	10	3	1	–	3	1	1	–	–	11	6	2
DF	Frank Rankmore	45	–	7	9	–	3	1	–	–	55	–	10
DF	Neil Townsend	13	–	1	–	–	–	–	–	–	13	–	1
MF	Bernie Fagan	6	–	–	2	–	–	–	–	–	8	–	–
MF	Graham Felton	43	1	6	9	–	1	1	–	–	53	1	7
MF	Peter Hawkins	9	2	2	–	–	–	–	1	–	9	3	2
MF	Joe Kiernan	41	–	3	8	–	–	1	–	–	50	–	3
MF	Barry Lines	7	5	–	1	–	–	1	–	–	9	5	–
MF	John McGleish	–	–	–	–	–	–	–	–	–	–	–	–
MF	Dixie McNeil	19	–	6	5	–	2	1	–	–	25	–	8
MF	Eric Ross	33	2	3	8	–	–	–	–	–	41	2	3
MF	Eric Weaver	14	2	–	4	–	–	1	–	–	19	2	–
FW	John Fairbrother	46	–	23	9	–	2	1	–	–	56	–	25
FW	Frank Large	40	–	10	9	–	2	–	–	–	49	–	12
Players who left before end of season:
GK	Des McPartland	6	–	–	–	–	–	–	–	–	6	–	–
GK	Gordon Morritt	8	–	–	–	–	–	1	–	–	9	–	–
