= 1970–71 Northampton Town F.C. season =

Northampton Town
1970–71 season
- Chairman: Eric Northover
- Manager: Dave Bowen
- Stadium: County Ground
- Division Four: 7th
- FA Cup: First round
- League Cup: Third round
- Top goalscorer: League: John Fairbrother (15); All: John Fairbrother (18)
- Highest home attendance: 11,923 vs Notts County
- Lowest home attendance: 3,337 vs Workington
- Average home league attendance: 6,602

The 1970–71 season was Northampton Town's 74th season in their history and the second successive season in the Fourth Division. Alongside competing in Division Four, the club also participated in the FA Cup and League Cup.

== Players ==
As of match played 1 May 1971.

Name	Position	Nat.	Place of Birth	Date of Birth (Age)	Apps	Goals	Previous club	Date signed	Fee
Goalkeepers
Kim Book	GK	(England)	Bath	12 February 1946 (aged 25)	94	0	Bournemouth & B A	July 1969	
David Hill	GK	(England)	Kettering	28 September 1953 (aged 17)	1	0	Apprentice	August 1970	N/A
Defenders
Eric Brookes	FB	(England)	Darton	3 February 1944 (aged 27)	98	3	Barnsley	July 1969	
John Clarke	CB	(England)	Northampton	23 October 1945 (aged 25)	139	0	Apprentice	July 1965	N/A
Ray Fairfax	FB	(England)	Smethwick	14 November 1941 (aged 29)	138	2	West Bromwich Albion	July 1968	
Brian Heslop	U	(England)	Carlisle	4 August 1947 (aged 23)	10	0	Sunderland	March 1971	
Phil Neal	U	(England)	Irchester	20 February 1951 (aged 20)	59	8	Apprentice	July 1968	N/A
Alan Oman	FB	(England)	Newcastle upon Tyne	6 October 1952 (aged 18)	2	0	Apprentice	October 1970	N/A
Frank Rankmore	CB	(Wales)	Cardiff	21 July 1939 (aged 31)	126	19	Peterborough United	August 1968	£12,000
Neil Townsend	CB	(England)	Long Buckby	1 February 1950 (aged 21)	50	1	Apprentice	September 1968	N/A
Barry Tucker	FB	(Wales)	Swansea	28 August 1952 (aged 18)	0	0	Apprentice	July 1970	N/A
Midfielders
John Buchanan	W	(Scotland)	Dingwall	19 September 1951 (aged 19)	3	0	Ross County	October 1970	
Graham Felton	W	(England)	Cambridge	1 March 1949 (aged 22)	145	13	Apprentice	September 1966	N/A
Trevor Gould	CM	(England)	Coventry	5 March 1950 (aged 21)	37	1	Coventry City	October 1970	
Peter Hawkins	LW	(Wales)	Swansea	9 November 1951 (aged 19)	25	3	Apprentice	July 1968	N/A
Joe Kiernan	CM	(Scotland)	Coatbridge	22 October 1942 (aged 28)	310	14	Sunderland	July 1963	
John McGleish	CM	(Scotland)	Airdrie	18 December 1951 (aged 19)	3	0	Apprentice	November 1968	N/A
Dixie McNeil	W	(England)	Melton Mowbray	16 January 1947 (aged 24)	76	22	Corby Town	May 1969	£5,000
Eric Ross	CM	(Northern Ireland)	Belfast	19 September 1944 (aged 26)	68	5	Newcastle United	August 1969	
Forwards
Keith East	CF	(England)	Southampton	31 October 1944 (aged 26)	35	9	Bournemouth & B A	July 1970	£5,000
John Fairbrother	CF	(England)	Cricklewood	12 February 1941 (aged 30)	159	62	Peterborough United	February 1968	
Frank Large	CF	(England)	Leeds	26 January 1940 (aged 31)	188	74	Fulham	August 1969	

== Competitions ==
=== Division Four ===
==== League table ====
Pos	Team	Pld	W	D	L	GF	GA	GAv	Pts	Promotion or relegation
5	Chester	46	24	7	15	69	55	1.255	55	
6	Colchester United	46	21	12	13	70	54	1.296	54	Qualified for the Watney Cup (Note: The two teams who scored the most goals in each division, and did not qualify for Europe and were not promoted, qualified for the Watney Cup.)
7	Northampton Town	46	19	13	14	63	59	1.068	51	
8	Southport	46	21	6	19	63	57	1.105	48	
9	Exeter City	46	17	14	15	67	68	0.985	48	

Source: rsssf.com

==== Results summary ====
Overall								Home						Away					
Pld	W	D	L	GF	GA	GAv	Pts	W	D	L	GF	GA	Pts	W	D	L	GF	GA	Pts
46	19	13	14	63	59	1.068	51	15	4	4	39	24	34	4	9	10	24	35	17

Last updated: 8 March 2022.

==== League position by match ====
Round	1	2	3	4	5	6	7	8	9	10	11	12	13	14	15	16	17	18	19	20	21	22	23	24	25	26	27	28	29	30	31	32	33	34	35	36	37	38	39	40	41	42	43	44	45	46
Ground	A	H	A	H	H	A	H	H	A	H	A	H	H	A	H	A	H	H	A	A	H	A	A	H	H	A	A	H	A	A	H	A	A	H	A	H	H	A	H	A	A	H	H	A	A	H
Result	W	W	D	W	W	W	W	D	L	W	L	W	W	D	W	L	W	D	W	D	L	D	W	W	W	D	L	W	D	D	L	L	D	W	L	D	D	L	W	L	D	L	W	L	L	L
Position	5	1	4	3	2	2	1	3	4	3	4	5	4	4	2	2	2	4	2	2	2	3	3	3	2	3	3	3	3	4	4	4	3	4	4	4	6	6	6	6	6	6	6	6	7	7

Source: 11v11.com
A = Away; H = Home; W = Win; D = Draw; L = Loss

==== Matches ====
Win Draw Loss

15 August 1970 1	Newport County	0–1	Northampton Town	Newport, Wales
15:00 BST			F.Rankmore	Stadium: Somerton Park; Attendance: 4,518

22 August 1970 2	Northampton Town	2–1	Cambridge United	Northampton
15:00 BST	K.East; Neal			Stadium: County Ground; Attendance: 7,901

29 August 1970 3	Colchester United	1–1	Northampton Town	Colchester
15:00 BST	B.Owen 3'	Report	K.East 43'	Stadium: Layer Road; Attendance: 5,220; Referee: Harold Hackney

1 September 1970 4	Northampton Town	2–1	Southport	Northampton
19:30 BST	F.Rankmore; K.East			Stadium: County Ground; Attendance: 6,264

5 September 1970 5	Northampton Town	3–2	York City	Northampton
15:00 BST	K.East; F.Large; G.Felton			Stadium: County Ground; Attendance: 7,038

12 September 1970 6	Grimsby Town	0–2	Northampton Town	Cleethorpes
15:00 BST			F.Large; J.Fairbrother	Stadium: Blundell Park; Attendance: 4,760

19 September 1970 7	Northampton Town	1–0	Barrow	Northampton
15:00 BST	G.Felton			Stadium: County Ground; Attendance: 6,509

22 September 1970 8	Northampton Town	1–1	Stockport County	Northampton
19:30 BST	J.Fairbrother			Stadium: County Ground; Attendance: 7,873

25 September 1970 9	Southend United	1–0	Northampton Town	Southend-on-Sea
15:00 BST				Stadium: Roots Hall; Attendance: 9,623

3 October 1970 10	Northampton Town	1–0	Brentford	Northampton
15:00 BST	E.Ross			Stadium: County Ground; Attendance: 6,282

10 October 1970 11	Workington	2–0	Northampton Town	Workington
15:00 BST				Stadium: Borough Park; Attendance: 2,564

17 October 1970 12	Northampton Town	1–0	Newport County	Northampton
15:00 BST	D.McNeil			Stadium: County Ground; Attendance: 6,171

20 October 1970 13	Northampton Town	3–1	Chester	Northampton
19:30 BST	K.East; F.Large; J.Fairbrother			Stadium: County Ground; Attendance: 6,152

24 October 1970 14	Darlington	0–0	Northampton Town	Darlington
15:00 BST				Stadium: Feethams; Attendance: 2,815

31 October 1970 15	Northampton Town	2–0	Hartlepool United	Northampton
15:00 BST	D.McNeil; P.Neal			Stadium: County Ground; Attendance: 6,049

7 November 1970 16	Notts County	1–0	Northampton Town	Nottingham
15:00 BST				Stadium: Meadow Lane; Attendance: 21,012

10 November 1970 17	Northampton Town	2–0	Peterborough United	Northampton
19:30 BST	D.McNeil			Stadium: County Ground; Attendance: 8,190

14 November 1970 18	Northampton Town	1–1	Crewe Alexandra	Northampton
15:00 BST	F.Rankmore			Stadium: County Ground; Attendance: 5,963

18 November 1970 19	Lincoln City	1–3	Northampton Town	Lincoln
19:30 BST			J.Kiernan; D.McNeil; F.Large	Stadium: Sincil Bank; Attendance: 3,689

28 November 1970 20	Scunthorpe United	2–2	Northampton Town	Scunthorpe
15:00 BST			F.Large	Stadium: Old Show Ground; Attendance: 3,463

5 December 1970 21	Northampton Town	1–3	Oldham Athletic	Northampton
15:00 BST	D.McNeil			Stadium: County Ground; Attendance: 6,487

12 December 1970 22	Stockport County	1–1	Northampton Town	Stockport
15:00 BST			J.Fairbrother	Stadium: Edgeley Park; Attendance: 1,846

19 December 1970 23	Cambridge United	0–2	Northampton Town	Cambridge
15:00 BST			F.Large; G.Felton	Stadium: Abbey Stadium; Attendance: 4,814

26 December 1970 24	Northampton Town	2–0	Aldershot	Northampton
15:00 BST	K.East; G.Felton			Stadium: County Ground; Attendance: 6,354

9 January 1971 25	Northampton Town	2–1	Lincoln City	Northampton
15:00 BST	F.Large; J.Fairbrother			Stadium: County Ground; Attendance: 5,957

16 January 1971 26	Chester City	2–2	Northampton Town	Chester
15:00 BST			D.McNeil; J.Fairbrother	Stadium: Sealand Road; Attendance: 4,031

23 January 1971 27	Bournemouth & Boscombe Athletic	4–2	Northampton Town	Bournemouth
15:00 BST			D.McNeil; F.Large	Stadium: Dean Court; Attendance: 8,763

30 January 1971 28	Northampton Town	1–0	Scunthorpe United	Northampton
15:00 BST	F.Large			Stadium: County Ground; Attendance: 4,607

6 February 1971 29	Oldham Athletic	1–1	Northampton Town	Oldham
15:00 BST			F.Large	Stadium: Boundary Park; Attendance: 12,806

9 February 1971 30	Exeter City	1–1	Northampton Town	Exeter
19:30 BST			J.Fairbrother	Stadium: St James Park; Attendance: 5,016

13 February 1971 31	Northampton Town	2–3	Bournemouth & Boscombe Athletic	Northampton
15:00 BST	J.Fairbrother			Stadium: County Ground; Attendance: 8,854

20 February 1971 32	Peterborough United	1–0	Northampton Town	Peterborough
15:00 BST				Stadium: London Road; Attendance: 8,066

27 February 1971 33	Hartlepool United	2–2	Northampton Town	Hartlepool
15:00 BST			J.Fairbrother; E.Ross	Stadium: Victoria Park; Attendance: 1,288

5 March 1971 34	Northampton Town	2–0	Darlington	Northampton
19:30 BST	K.East; F.Large			Stadium: County Ground; Attendance: 6,040

13 March 1971 35	Crewe Alexandra	3–0	Northampton Town	Crewe
15:00 BST				Stadium: Gresty Road; Attendance: 3,242

16 March 1971 36	Northampton Town	2–2	Exeter City	Northampton
19:30 BST	J.Fairbrother			Stadium: County Ground; Attendance: 5,724

20 March 1971 37	Northampton Town	1–1	Notts County	Northampton
15:00 BST	F.Large			Stadium: County Ground; Attendance: 11,923

27 March 1971 38	York City	4–1	Northampton Town	York
15:00 BST			J.Fairbrother	Stadium: Bootham Crescent; Attendance: 7,393

3 April 1971 39	Northampton Town	2–1	Colchester United	Northampton
15:00 BST	D.McNeil 6', 40'	Report	J.Kurila 49'	Stadium: County Ground; Attendance: 7,909; Referee: Clive Thomas

9 April 1971 40	Brentford	3–0	Northampton Town	Brentford, London
19:30 BST				Stadium: Griffin Park; Attendance: 10,058

10 April 1971 41	Aldershot	1–1	Northampton Town	Aldershot
15:00 BST			R.Fairfax	Stadium: Recreation Ground; Attendance: 4,461

13 April 1971 42	Northampton Town	0–4	Grimsby Town	Northampton
19:30 BST				Stadium: County Ground; Attendance: 6,538

17 April 1971 43	Northampton Town	5–0	Workington	Northampton
15:00 BST	D.McNeil; F.Large; T.Gould; J.Fairbrother			Stadium: County Ground; Attendance: 3,337

24 April 1971 44	Barrow	2–1	Northampton Town	Barrow-in-Furness
15:00 BST			D.McNeil	Stadium: Holker Street; Attendance: 1,466

26 April 1971 45	Southport	2–1	Northampton Town	Southport
15:00 BST			D.McNeil	Stadium: Haig Avenue; Attendance: 1,550

1 May 1971 46	Northampton Town	0–2	Southend United	Northampton
15:00 BST				Stadium: County Ground; Attendance: 3,713

=== FA Cup ===
21 November 1970 First round	Hereford United	2–2	Northampton Town	Hereford
15:00 GMT			D.McNeil; J.Fairbrother	Stadium: Edgar Street; Attendance: 10,401

24 November 1970 First round (r)	Northampton Town	1–2	Hereford United	Northampton
19:30 GMT	F.Rankmore			Stadium: County Ground; Attendance: 10,641

=== League Cup ===
19 August 1970 First round	Scunthorpe United	2–3	Northampton Town	Scunthorpe
19:30 BST			E.Brookes; K.East; J.Fairbrother	Stadium: Old Show Ground; Attendance: 4,470

9 September 1970 Second round	York City	0–0	Northampton Town	York
19:30 BST				Stadium: Bootham Crescent; Attendance: 5,265

15 September 1970 Second round (r)	Northampton Town	1–1	York City	Northampton
19:30 BST	E.Brookes			Stadium: County Ground; Attendance: 7,247

28 September 1970 Second round (r2)	Northampton Town	2–1	York City	Birmingham
19:30 BST	K.East; J.Fairbrother			Stadium: Villa Park; Attendance: 2,561

7 October 1970 Third round	Northampton Town	1–1	Aston Villa	Northampton
19:30 BST	F.Large			Stadium: County Ground; Attendance: 15,072

13 October 1970 Third round (r)	Aston Villa	3–0	Northampton Town	Birmingham
19:30 BST				Stadium: Villa Park; Attendance: 25,822

=== Appearances and goals ===
Pos	Player	Division Four			FA Cup			League Cup			Total		
Pos	Player	Starts	Sub	Goals	Starts	Sub	Goals	Starts	Sub	Goals	Starts	Sub	Goals
GK	Kim Book	45	–	–	2	–	–	6	–	–	53	–	–
GK	David Hill	1	–	–	–	–	–	–	–	–	1	–	–
DF	Eric Brookes	38	–	–	2	–	–	6	–	2	46	–	2
DF	John Clarke	42	–	–	2	–	–	6	–	–	50	–	–
DF	Ray Fairfax	34	–	1	2	–	–	5	–	–	41	–	1
DF	Brian Heslop	10	–	–	–	–	–	–	–	–	10	–	–
DF	Phil Neal	18	–	2	–	–	–	2	–	–	20	–	2
DF	Alan Oman	2	–	–	–	–	–	–	–	–	2	–	–
DF	Frank Rankmore	25	–	3	2	–	1	6	–	–	33	–	4
DF	Neil Townsend	15	–	–	–	–	–	–	1	–	15	1	–
DF	Barry Tucker	–	–	–	–	–	–	–	–	–	–	–	–
MF	John Buchanan	2	1	–	–	–	–	–	–	–	2	1	–
MF	Graham Felton	26	1	4	–	1	–	3	–	–	29	2	4
MF	Trevor Gould	35	–	1	2	–	–	–	–	–	37	–	1
MF	Peter Hawkins	4	2	–	–	–	–	–	–	–	4	2	–
MF	Joe Kiernan	42	1	1	2	–	–	6	–	–	50	1	1
MF	John McGleish	2	1	–	–	–	–	–	–	–	2	1	–
MF	Dixie McNeil	43	1	13	2	–	1	4	1	–	49	2	14
MF	Eric Ross	15	3	2	2	–	–	4	1	–	21	4	2
FW	Keith East	26	3	7	–	–	–	6	–	2	32	3	9
FW	John Fairbrother	40	2	15	2	–	1	6	–	2	48	2	18
FW	Frank Large	41	–	14	2	–	–	6	–	1	49	–	15
