= Phil Neal =

English footballer (born 1951)

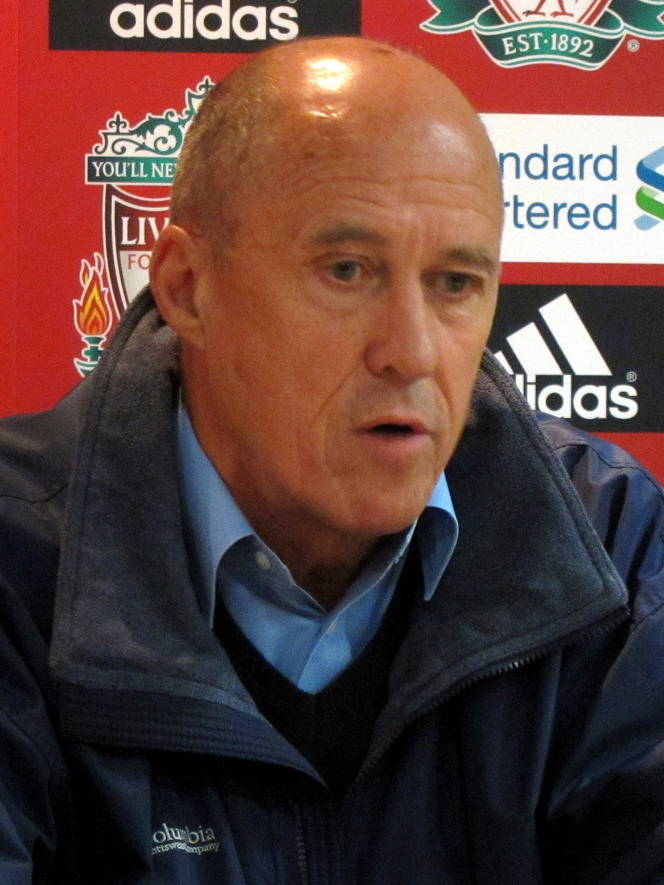
- Neal in 2012

Personal information
- Full name: Philip George Neal
- Date of birth: 20 February 1951 (age 75)
- Place of birth: Irchester, Northamptonshire, England
- Height: 1.80 m (5 ft 11 in)
- Position: Full-back

Senior career*
Years	Team	Apps	(Gls)
1967–1974	Northampton Town	187	(28)
1974–1985	Liverpool	455	(41)
1985–1989	Bolton Wanderers	64	(3)
Total		706	(72)

International career
1976–1983	England	50	(5)

Managerial career
- 1985–1992: Bolton Wanderers
- 1993–1995: Coventry City
- 1996: Cardiff City
- 1996: Manchester City (caretaker)
- * Club domestic league appearances and goals

Philip George Neal (born 20 February 1951) is an English retired footballer who played for Northampton Town, Liverpool and Bolton Wanderers as a full-back. He is regarded as one of the most successful English players of all time, having won eight First Division titles, four League Cups, five FA Charity Shields, four European Cups, one UEFA Cup and one UEFA Super Cup during his eleven years at Liverpool. He later returned to Bolton Wanderers as manager, leading them to victory in the Football League Trophy before spells managing Coventry City, Cardiff City and Manchester City.

Neal also had a long career with the England national team, winning 50 caps and playing in the 1982 World Cup. He would go on to be England's assistant manager under Graham Taylor.

Neal's nickname whilst at Liverpool was Zico – a reference to the Brazilian play maker and a compliment to Neal, who was known for scoring important goals throughout the club's history. His son, Ashley Neal, also became a footballer.

When he retired, he was near to 1,000 career appearances.

== Playing career ==
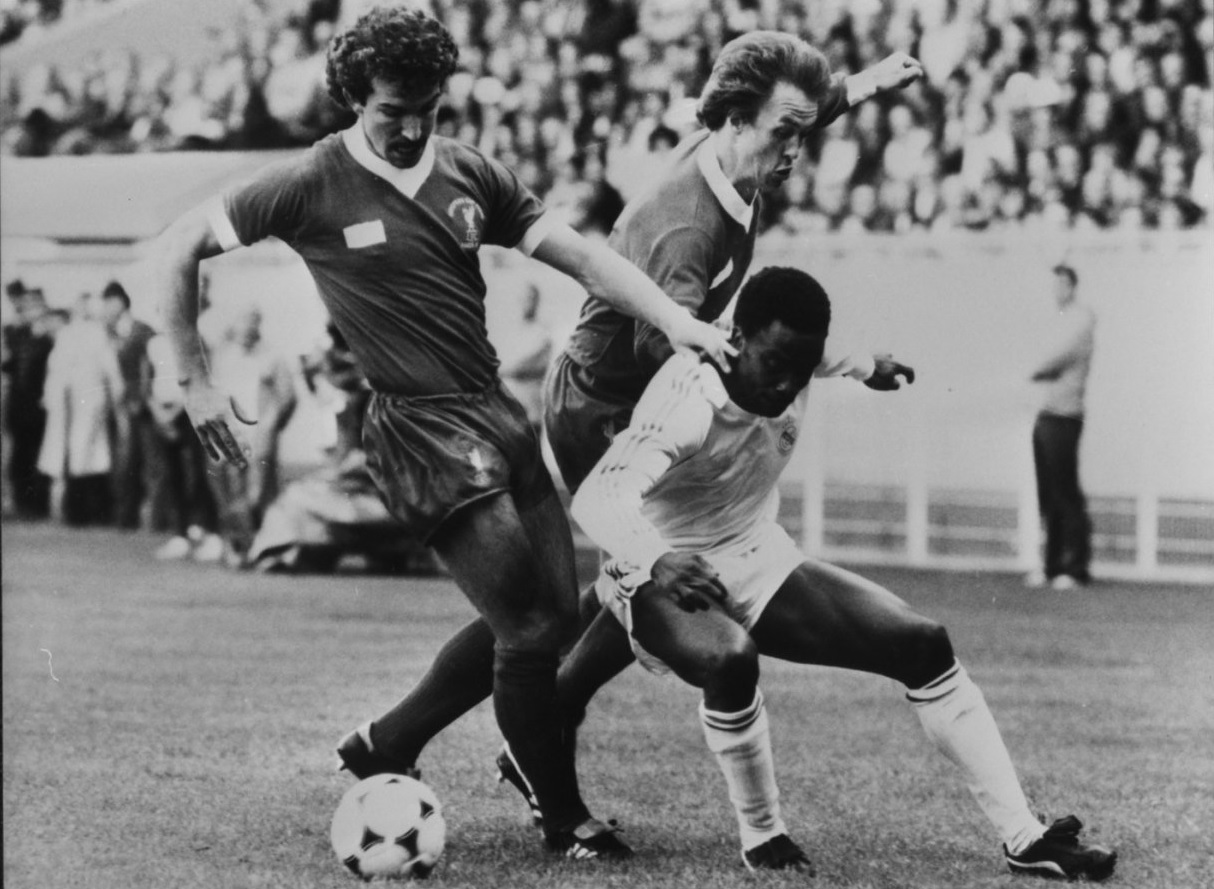
Neal (top right) playing in 1981

Neal began his playing career at Wellingborough Town, before he joined Northampton Town in 1967. He went on to make 187 appearances for the club before being signed on 9 October 1974 for £66,000 by Liverpool manager Bob Paisley. Paisley had intended to break Neal in as a replacement for the ageing Chris Lawler, meaning that he initially played as a left-back. It would be, however, his industrious and energetic performances at right-back where he made his name.

Neal made his Liverpool debut in the Merseyside derby against Everton at Goodison Park on 16 November 1974, a game which ended 0–0. Neal made his debut alongside midfielder Terry McDermott. Neal's first goal for the club came almost exactly one year later on 4 November 1975, during the 6–0 defeat of Real Sociedad in a UEFA Cup game at Anfield.

Neal scored from the penalty spot late in the 1977 European Cup Final, when the Anfield club beat Borussia Mönchengladbach 3–1 in Rome to win the European Cup for the first time. Neal subsequently played in the winning 1978 and 1981 finals, Liverpool beating Club Brugge and Real Madrid respectively. He scored in the first half of the 1984 final against Roma, which ended 1–1 and was decided on penalty kicks, won by Liverpool (with Neal scoring Liverpool's first goal of the shootout, from its second shot). Neal was the only player to appear in all four of Liverpool's European Cup wins of the 1970s and 1980s.

In total, Neal won eight First Divisions, four League Cups, five FA Charity Shields, four European Cups, one UEFA Cup and one UEFA Super Cup during his eleven years at Liverpool, making him one of the most successful Englishmen ever to play the game. During his Liverpool career, Neal was ever-present in the starting line-up for several seasons. He played 366 consecutive league matches (a club record and among the highest in English football history) from 14 December 1974 until 24 September 1983, when he suffered an injury against Manchester United that forced him to miss the following week's match against Sunderland.

Neal departed Anfield after 11 years in 1985, joining Bolton Wanderers as player-manager. He retired from playing in 1989 after more than 700 league appearances and 50 caps for England.

== Managerial career ==
In December 1985, Neal was appointed player-manager of Bolton Wanderers and managed the club for seven years. During this period, Neal led the club to win the Football League Trophy in 1989, although the club would later suffer relegation to the Fourth Division for the first time in their history. They won promotion back to the Third Division the following season, reaching the Third Division play-offs in 1990 and 1991 but failed to win promotion on either occasion. In 1991, they had been pipped to automatic promotion by Grimsby Town on goal difference, and lost to Tranmere Rovers in the playoff final. A year later, they finished 13th in the Third Division and Neal was sacked on 8 May 1992. His successor was Bruce Rioch, who guided Bolton to promotion from the newly named Division Two (rebranded as part of a reorganisation prompted by the creation of the FA Premier League) in 1993 and to the top flight in 1995.

Neal returned to club management on 23 October 1993 with Coventry City, beginning his spell at Highfield Road on that day with a 5–1 defeat against QPR that left them 12th in the Premier League. Despite a shaky start to his time as Sky Blues manager, they did well in the second half of the season and finished 11th in the league – their highest finish since coming seventh in 1989. Perhaps the most impressive result that season after Neal's arrival was a 4–0 home win over Manchester City on 19 February 1994. However, Coventry struggled in 1994–95 despite the £2million arrival of striker Dion Dublin from Manchester United on 10 September, and Neal was sacked on 14 February 1995 despite a 2–0 away win over fellow strugglers Crystal Palace three days earlier, which saw them 17th in the Premier League and two places above the relegation zone. Neal's successor Ron Atkinson ensured City's survival.

He was appointed manager of Cardiff City in Division Three in February 1996, but in October that year he left Ninian Park to become assistant manager to Steve Coppell at Manchester City who were struggling in Division One after relegation from the Premier League. However, Coppell resigned on 8 November 1996 and Neal became caretaker manager until the arrival of Frank Clark on 29 December.

For the 1997–98 season, Neal was recruited as assistant manager to chairman-manager Barry Fry at Peterborough United after their relegation to Division Three, but he was axed by Fry on 15 March 1998.

He has also played for and coached the Liverpool masters side which dominated the Sky Sports Masters series.

== Media ==
In recent years, Neal has worked as a football pundit for various television and radio organisations.

He has written two autobiographies, Attack from the Back in 1981 and Life at the Kop in 1986.

== Career statistics ==
=== Club ===
Appearances and goals by club, season and competition
Club	Season	League			FA Cup		League Cup		Continental		Other		Total	
Club	Season	Division	Apps	Goals	Apps	Goals	Apps	Goals	Apps	Goals	Apps	Goals	Apps	Goals
Northampton Town	1968–69	Third Division	21	4	1	0	0	0	–		–		22	4
Northampton Town	1969–70	Fourth Division	13	1	3	1	1	0	–		–		17	2
Northampton Town	1970–71	Fourth Division	18	2	0	0	2	0	–		–		20	2
Northampton Town	1971–72	Fourth Division	41	1	4	0	1	0	–		–		46	1
Northampton Town	1972–73	Fourth Division	38	9	1	0	1	0	–		–		40	9
Northampton Town	1973–74	Fourth Division	46	9	3	0	1	0	–		–		50	9
Northampton Town	1974–75	Fourth Division	10	2	0	0	3	1	–		–		13	3
Northampton Town	Total		187	28	12	1	9	1	0	0	0	0	208	30
Liverpool	1974–75	First Division	23	0	2	0	0	0	0	0	–		25	0
Liverpool	1975–76	First Division	42	6	2	0	3	0	12	1	–		59	7
Liverpool	1976–77	First Division	42	7	8	2	2	0	8	4	1 (Note: Appearance in FA Charity Shield)	0	61	13
Liverpool	1977–78	First Division	42	4	1	0	9	1	9	2	1	0	62	7
Liverpool	1978–79	First Division	42	5	7	0	1	0	4	0	–		54	5
Liverpool	1979–80	First Division	42	1	8	0	7	0	2	0	1	0	60	1
Liverpool	1980–81	First Division	42	2	2	0	9	0	9	1	1	0	63	3
Liverpool	1981–82	First Division	42	2	3	0	10	1	6	0			62^{2}	3
Liverpool	1982–83	First Division	42	8	3	0	8	1	6	2	1	0	60	11
Liverpool	1983–84	First Division	41	1	2	0	12	1	8	1	1	0	64	3
Liverpool	1984–85	First Division	42	4	7	1	3	0	10	0	2 (Note: One appearance in FA Charity Shield, one appearance in Intercontinental Cup)	0	64	5
Liverpool	1985–86	First Division	13	1	0	0	2	0	0	0	1 (Note: Appearance in Football League Super Cup)	0	16	1
Liverpool	Total		455	41	45	3	66	4	74	11			650	59
Bolton Wanderers	1985–86	Third Division	20	2	–		–		–		–		20	2
Bolton Wanderers	1986–87	Third Division	28	1	–		–		–		–		28	1
Bolton Wanderers	1987–88	Fourth Division	8	0	–		–		–		–		8	0
Bolton Wanderers	1988–89	Third Division	8	0	–		–		–		–		8	0
Bolton Wanderers	Total		64	3	0	0	0	0	0	0	0	0	64	3
Career total			706	72	57	4	75	5	74	11			922	92

=== International ===
Appearances and goals by national team and year
National team	Year	Apps	Goals
England	1976	2	0
England	1977	7	0
England	1978	6	3
England	1979	7	0
England	1980	7	0
England	1981	5	0
England	1982	8	1
England	1983	8	1
Total		50	5

Scores and results list England's goal tally first, score column indicates score after each Neal goal.

List of international goals scored by Phil Neal
No.	Date	Venue	Opponent	Score	Result	Competition
1	16 May 1978	Wembley Stadium, London, England	Northern Ireland	1–0	1–0	1977–78 British Home Championship
2	24 May 1978	Wembley Stadium, London, England	Hungary	2–0	4–1	Friendly
3	20 September 1978	Københavns Idrætspark, Copenhagen, Denmark	Denmark	4–2	4–3	UEFA Euro 1980 qualification
4	15 December 1982	Wembley Stadium, London, England	Luxembourg	9–0	9–0	UEFA Euro 1984 qualification
5	23 February 1983	Wembley Stadium, London, England	Wales	2–1	2–1	1982–83 British Home Championship

== Honours ==
=== Player ===
Liverpool

- Football League First Division: 1975–76, 1976–77, 1978–79, 1979–80, 1981–82, 1982–83, 1983–84, 1985–86
- Football League Cup: 1980–81, 1981–82, 1982–83, 1983–84; runner-up: 1977–78
- FA Charity Shield: 1976, 1977 (shared), 1979, 1980, 1982
- European Cup: 1976–77, 1977–78, 1980–81, 1983–84
- UEFA Cup: 1975–76
- UEFA Super Cup: 1977
- Football League Super Cup: 1986
- FA Cup runner-up: 1976–77

=== Manager ===
Bolton Wanderers

- Associate Members' Cup: 1988–89; runner-up: 1985–86
