= Steve Book =

English footballer

Personal information
- Full name: Steven Kim Book
- Date of birth: 7 July 1969 (age 57)
- Place of birth: Bournemouth, England
- Height: 5 ft 11 in (1.80 m)
- Position: Goalkeeper

Senior career*
Years	Team	Apps	(Gls)
1988–1989	Welton Rovers	36	(0)
1989–1990	Paulton Rovers	28	
1990–1991	Frome Town	52	
1992–1993	Weston-super-Mare	89	
- Bath City
1993–1994	Brighton & Hove Albion	0	(0)
1993–1994	→ Slough Town (loan)	2	(0)
	Frome Town	16	
1994–1995	Lincoln City	0	(0)
1994–1997	Forest Green Rovers	125	(0)
1997–2004	Cheltenham Town	307	(0)
2004–2005	Swindon Town	2	(0)
2005–2006	Cirencester Town	12	(0)
2005–2006	Bristol Rovers	1	
2006–2007	Mangotsfield United	36	(1)
2007–2008	Bristol Rovers	0	
2008–2010	Tiverton Town	96	(0)
2010–2012	Cheltenham Town	0	(0)
Total		802	(1)

International career
1999	England C	3	(0)
- * Club domestic league appearances and goals

Steven Kim Book (born 7 July 1969) is an English former professional football goalkeeper who is the former goalkeeping coach at Cheltenham Town.

Book represented a number of clubs in the English football league system during a career which began in 1988 at Welton Rovers and concluded with a two-year stint as player-goalkeeping coach at Cheltenham Town between 2010 and 2012. He then retired from playing to focus on coaching at Cheltenham Town.

== Career ==
=== Early career ===
The son of former professional goalkeeper Kim Book and nephew of the former Manchester City manager Tony Book, Book began his career on the South-West non-league circuit with clubs such as Paulton Rovers, Welton Rovers, Frome Town and Weston-super-Mare. He moved on to Bath City and spent the initial part of the 1993–94 at Brighton without breaking into the first team though he did make a couple of appearances for Slough Town whilst on loan there. A change of management saw him return to the non-league scene with Frome Town before a period at Lincoln City where he was an unused substitute in a couple of League Cup ties in the 1994–95 season.

=== Forest Green Rovers ===
In September 1994 Book joined Forest Green Rovers. He spent three years at the Nailsworth club making 125 appearances, before an £8,000 transfer took him to Cheltenham Town in July 1997.

=== Cheltenham Town ===
Book was the first-choice goalkeeper at Cheltenham for seven years, leading them to promotion into the League, a FA Trophy win, then into the Football League Second Division via the playoffs in 2002. His career at Cheltenham also seen him win England semi-pro honours and The Conference Team of the year 1998–99.

He left Cheltenham in the summer of 2004 and joined Swindon Town.

=== Swindon Town, Bristol Rovers and non-League football ===
In July 2005, and without a professional club, the Emersons Green-based Book linked up with Bristol Rovers for training and also to assist coaching the club's younger goalkeepers. On 16 August 2005, he was appointed goalkeeping coach at Bristol Rovers on a permanent basis, succeeding Phil Kite in the role to allow Kite to concentrate fully on his role as physio. Book combined his coaching role with a playing role with Cirencester Town, debuting for the club in the 2–0 Southern Football League Premier Division victory at Chesham United on 13 August 2005. He made twelve league appearances for the club, the final one in a 1–0 defeat at Aylesbury United on 22 November 2005, before leaving the club and signing non-contract terms with Bristol Rovers where he was given the squad number 25.

As a player, he joined Mangotsfield in the summer of 2006 and on 26 August scored the first goal of his career when a sliced free-kick from his own area managed to outfox the Rugby Town goalkeeper. In June 2007, he departed the club by mutual consent after being told he didn't figure in the plans of newly appointed manager Frank Gregan.

In 2008, he joined Southern League Premier Division side Tiverton Town. Is still goalkeeping coach at Bristol Rovers and holds the level two coaching badge, UEFA C goalkeeping and UEFA B goalkeeping licence. On 10 June 2010, he agreed to join his former club Cheltenham Town as a part-time goalkeeping coach. At this time, Steve Book was given the worst ever Fifa Ultimate Team rating at 40 on Fifa 12 and he is still the worst to date. In August 2011, at the age of 42, Book was again registered as a goalkeeper at Cheltenham for a League Cup match against MK Dons where he sat on the bench.

== Career statistics ==
Appearances and goals by club, season and competition
Club	Years	League			FA Cup		League Cup		Other		Total	
Club	Years	Division	Apps	Goals	Apps	Goals	Apps	Goals	Apps	Goals	Apps	Goals
Brighton & Hove Albion	1993 to 1994	Football League	0	0	0	0	0	0	0	0	0	0
Slough Town(Loan)	1993 to 1994	Football Conference	2	0	0	0	0	0	0	0	2	0
Lincoln City	1994 to 1995	Football League	0	0	0	0	0	0	0	0	0	0
Forest Green Rovers	1995 to 1997	Football Conference	125									
Cheltenham Town	1997 to 2004	Football League	171	0	20	0	7	0	9	0	207	0
Swindon Town	2004 to 2005	Football League	2	0	0	0	1	0	2	0	4	0
Bristol Rovers	2005 to 2006	Football League	1	0	0	0	0	0	0	0	1	0
Mangotsfield United	2006 to 2007	Southern League	3	1	0	0	0	0	0	0	3	1
Bristol Rovers	2007 to 2008	Football League	0	0	0	0	0	0	0	0	0	0
Tiverton Town	2008 to 2010	Southern League Premier Division	84	0	2	0	1	0	12	0	57	0
Career total			221	1	22	0	9	0	23	0	275	1

== Honours ==
=== As a player ===
Cheltenham Town

- Football League Third Division play-offs: 2002
- Football Conference: 1998–99
- FA Trophy: 1997–98

Tiverton Town

- Devon St. Luke's Cup runner-up: 2008–09
