= Ashley Neal =

English footballer and YouTuber

- Born: 16 December 1974 (age 51); Northampton, England
- Occupations: Former professional footballer; Driving Instructor
- Known for: Driver education videos on YouTube
- Father: Phil Neal
Association football career
- Height: 1.88 m (6 ft 2 in)
- Position: Defender
Youth career
- Liverpool
Senior career*
Years	Team	Apps	(Gls)
1990–1996	Liverpool	0	(0)
1996	→ Brighton & Hove Albion (loan)	4	(0)
1996–1997	Huddersfield Town	0	(0)
1997–1998	Peterborough United	8	(0)
1999	Radcliffe Borough	4	(1)
Total		16	(1)
- * Club domestic league appearances and goals
- Website: www.ashleyneal.com

Ashley Neal (born 16 December 1974) is an English former professional footballer who played as a defender. He is the son of the former Liverpool player Phil Neal.

== Footballing career ==
On 26 September 1996, Neal was loaned to Brighton & Hove Albion. Two days later, he made his first league appearance in a 3–0 defeat to Northampton Town.

After a free transfer to Peterborough United, Neal made nine total appearances for the club. His first game for the club was in a 2–0 victory versus Preston North End. He made his first and only FA Cup appearance versus Dagenham & Redbridge on 6 December 1997. Major injury led Neal to an early retirement from the game after dropping into non-league football with Radcliffe Borough.

== Post-football ==
Retired from football, Neal now works as a driving instructor and an instructor trainer. His YouTube channel, where he analyses dashcam footage and gives advice on driving, had over 175,000 subscribers as of 6 June 2026.

On 18 April 2023, Neal started a second channel called "Ashley Neal – Just Cycling". His aim is to spread a positive message about cycling. It mostly uses body camera footage of him riding his bike and as of 12 June 2025 it has over 9,840 subscribers.

Neal has appeared on television to discuss issues relating to driver education. He has been featured multiple times on BBC Breakfast; such as on 9 October 2019, where he highlighted the poor treatment of learner drivers by other motorists, and on 2 July 2023, when he discussed the problem of candidate impersonation at driving tests.
