= Dennis Brown (English footballer) =

English footballer

Personal information
- Full name: Dennis John Brown
- Date of birth: 8 February 1944 (age 82)
- Place of birth: Reading, England
- Positions: Forward; midfielder

Youth career
- Battle Athletic
- 1962–1963: Chelsea

Senior career*
Years	Team	Apps	(Gls)
1963–1964	Chelsea	10	(1)
1964–1967	Swindon Town	92	(38)
1967–1969	Northampton Town	46	(10)
1969–1975	Aldershot Town	245	(55)
1975–1976	Margate		
1976–1979	Barnet	80	(10)
1979	Cheltenham Town		
1979–1980	Wokingham Town		
Total		473	(114)
- * Club domestic league appearances and goals

Dennis John Brown (born 8 February 1944) is an English former professional footballer who played as a forward.

== Club career ==
Born in Reading, Brown started his career with Battle Athletic before joining Chelsea, where he made his debut in 1963. He scored on his league debut against Manchester United, but would only go on to register nine more league appearances before being sold to Swindon Town in 1964. He stayed at Swindon until 1967, when he was transferred to Northampton Town in an exchange for Bobby Jones.

After just eight games for Northampton Town, Brown was involved in a serious car accident, in which he lost one kneecap and was sidelined for almost a year. He was unable to find his scoring form after the injury, and left for Aldershot Town in 1969.

After leaving the professional game, Brown moved to non-league side Margate in 1975. After one season, he joined Barnet, where he made 80 appearances, scoring ten goals. Following this, he went on to play for Cheltenham Town and Wokingham Town, before retiring in 1980.
