= Clive Walker (footballer, born 1945) =

English footballer and manager

Personal information
- Full name: David Clive Allan Walker
- Date of birth: 24 October 1945 (age 81)
- Place of birth: Watford, England
- Position: Defender

Youth career
- Leicester City

Senior career*
Years	Team	Apps	(Gls)
1962–1966	Leicester City	17	(0)
1966–1969	Northampton Town	72	(1)
1969–1975	Mansfield Town	229	(8)
1975–?	Chelmsford City		
- Gravesend & Northfleet

Managerial career
- 1979–1980: Northampton Town
- 1982–1984: Northampton Town
- 1992: Maidstone United
- 2002–2003: Dover Athletic
- 2005–2007: Dover Athletic
- 2007: Ashford Town (Kent)
- * Club domestic league appearances and goals

David Clive Allan Walker (born 24 October 1945) is an English-born former professional association footballer who played as a full back in the 1960s and 1970s.

His clubs included Leicester City (for whom he played in the second leg of the 1965 Football League Cup Final), Northampton Town and Mansfield Town. On two occasions Walker managed Northampton Town and was manager (having been upgraded from assistant) of Maidstone United in their final season as a Football League club in 1992 before their financial liquidation.

He had three spells in charge of Dover Athletic (one as caretaker), a brief spell in charge of Ashford Town (Kent) and in March 2008 he was appointed as a short-term caretaker coach of Maidstone United.

== Honours ==
Leicester City

- Football League Cup runner-up: 1964–65
