= Thomas Knox (footballer) =

Scottish footballer

Personal information
- Full name: Thomas Knox
- Date of birth: 5 September 1939 (age 87)
- Place of birth: Glasgow, Scotland
- Date of death: 2015 Upper Halliford Surrey
- Position: Winger

Senior career*
Years	Team	Apps	(Gls)
1959–1961	St Francis Juveniles		
1961–1962	East Stirlingshire		
1962–1965	Chelsea	20	(0)
1965–1966	Newcastle United	25	(1)
1967	Mansfield Town	34	(5)
1967–1968	Northampton Town	30	(0)
1969	St Mirren	1	(0)
1969–1972	Hillingdon Borough		
1972–1974	Tonbridge		
1974	Basingstoke Town		
Total		109	(6)
- * Club domestic league appearances and goals

Thomas Knox (born 5 September 1939) is a Scottish former professional footballer who played in the Football League for Chelsea, Mansfield Town, Newcastle United and Northampton Town.
