= John Byrne (Scottish footballer) =

Scottish footballer (born 1939)

Personal information
- Date of birth: 20 May 1939 (age 87)
- Place of birth: Cambuslang, Scotland
- Position: Inside forward

Youth career
- Pollok

Senior career*
Years	Team	Apps	(Gls)
1957	Hamilton Academical	1	(0)
1957–1960	Preston North End	0	(0)
1960–1961	Queen of the South	4	(1)
1961–1962	Tranmere Rovers	27	(4)
1962–1963	Hibernian	23	(5)
1963–1965	Barnsley	68	(13)
1965–1968	Peterborough United	107	(28)
1968–1969	Northampton Town	40	(4)
- Durban Spurs
Total		270	(55)
- * Club domestic league appearances and goals

John Byrne (born 20 May 1939) is a Scottish footballer who played as a winger in the Football League for Tranmere Rovers, Barnsley, Peterborough United and Northampton Town. He also played in his native Scotland for Hamilton Academical, Queen of the South and Hibernian.
