= Gordon Morritt =

English footballer (1942–2018)

Personal information
- Full name: Gordon Raymond Morritt
- Date of birth: 8 February 1942
- Place of birth: Rotherham, England
- Date of death: November 2018 (aged 76)
- Position: Goalkeeper

Senior career*
Years	Team	Apps	(Gls)
–	Steel Peech & Tozer		
1961–1966	Rotherham United	77	(0)
1966–1967	Durban City		
1967–1968	Doncaster Rovers	40	(0)
1968–1969	Northampton Town	42	(0)
1969–1972	York City	41	(0)
1972–1973	Rochdale	31	(0)
1973–1974	Darlington	34	(0)
- * Club domestic league appearances and goals

Gordon Raymond Morritt (8 February 1942 – November 2018) was an English footballer who made 265 appearances in the Football League playing as a goalkeeper for Rotherham United, Doncaster Rovers, Northampton Town, York City, Rochdale and Darlington in the 1960s and 1970s. He also played in South Africa for Durban City. He played in some of Rotherham's matches as they reached the first ever League Cup Final in 1961, but Roy Ironside was preferred for the final itself, in which Rotherham lost 3–0 on aggregate to Aston Villa.

Morritt was born in Rotherham in 1942, and died in November 2018 at the age of 76.
