= Eric Ross =

Northern Irish footballer

Personal information
- Full name: William Eric Ross
- Date of birth: 19 September 1944 (age 82)
- Place of birth: Belfast, Northern Ireland
- Positions: Inside forward; midfielder

Youth career
- –1962: Boyland F.C.

Senior career*
Years	Team	Apps	(Gls)
1962–1967	Glentoran	148	(32)
1967	→ Detroit Cougars (guest)	8	(1)
1967–1969	Newcastle United	2	(0)
1969–1972	Northampton Town	57	(5)
1971–1972	→ Hartlepool United (loan)	2	(0)
1972–1973	North Shields		
Total		217+	(38+)

International career
- Northern Ireland Schools
1966	Irish League XI	1	(0)
1967	Northern Ireland U23	1	(0)
1968	Northern Ireland	1	(0)
- * Club domestic league appearances and goals

William Eric Ross (born 19 September 1944) is a Northern Irish former footballer who played as an inside forward or midfielder and made one appearance for the Northern Ireland national team.

He was noted for wearing glasses while playing.

== Career ==
Ross earned his first and only cap for Northern Ireland on 10 September 1968 in a friendly against Israel. The away match, which was played in Tel Aviv, finished as a 3–2 win for Northern Ireland.

== Personal life ==
Ross was born on 19 September 1944 in Belfast. After his retirement from football, he moved to Canada in the 1970s, where he worked as a travel agent in the Vancouver area.

== Career statistics ==
=== International ===
Northern Ireland
Year	Apps	Goals
1968	1	0
Total	1	0
