= Kim Book =

English footballer

Personal information
- Date of birth: 12 February 1946 (age 80)
- Place of birth: Bath
- Position: Goalkeeper

Senior career*
Years	Team	Apps	(Gls)
- Bournemouth & Boscombe Athletic
- Northampton Town
- Mansfield Town
- Doncaster Rovers

Managerial career
- 1975: Weston-super-Mare
- * Club domestic league appearances and goals

Kim Book (born 12 February 1946) is an English former professional footballer who played as a goalkeeper for Bournemouth & Boscombe Athletic, Northampton Town, Mansfield Town and Doncaster Rovers (84 league games).

He is best known for being in goal for Northampton when George Best scored six goals for Manchester United in a FA Cup game on 7 February 1970.

He signed in 1967 and played until 1973. His brother Tony Book and son Steve Book also played football.

In the 1975 season he took over as manager at Weston-super-Mare.
