= John Roberts (footballer, born 1946) =

Welsh footballer

Personal information
- Full name: John Griffith Roberts
- Date of birth: 11 September 1946
- Place of birth: Abercynon, Wales
- Date of death: 4 January 2016 (aged 69)
- Position: Defender

Youth career
- 1961–1963: Abercynon Athletic
- 1963–1964: Swansea Town

Senior career*
Years	Team	Apps	(Gls)
1964–1967	Swansea Town	37	(16)
1967–1969	Northampton Town	62	(11)
1969–1972	Arsenal	59	(4)
1972–1976	Birmingham City	66	(1)
1976–1980	Wrexham	145	(5)
1980–1982	Hull City	26	(1)
1982–1983	Oswestry Town		

International career
1976-77	Wales U-21	1	(0)
	Wales U-23	5	(0)
1971–1976	Wales	22	(0)

Managerial career
- 1982–1983: Oswestry Town (player manager)
- * Club domestic league appearances and goals

John Griffith Roberts (11 September 1946 – 4 January 2016) was a Welsh footballer who made nearly 400 appearances in the Football League and won 22 caps for Wales.

== Playing career ==
Born in Abercynon, Rhondda Cynon Taff, Roberts played football for local club Abercynon Athletic while working as a railway fireman. He joined Swansea Town as an apprentice in 1963, turning professional in 1964. Initially a striker who later switched to centre half, he moved to Northampton Town in 1967

Roberts moved to Arsenal in May 1969 on a transfer fee of £30,000. He played for Arsenal for three seasons, including 18 appearances in the 1970–71 season, when Arsenal won the First Division title, thus earning him a championship medal. Roberts, however, did not play in the FA Cup Final the same year, which Arsenal also won to complete the Double. He won the first of his caps with Wales in a game versus England in the same year.

Roberts left Arsenal in 1972, having played a total of 81 matches, scoring five goals. He joined Birmingham City for a transfer fee of £140,000 in March 1972. He went on to have spells at Wrexham and Hull City before trying his hand as player-manager of Oswestry Town.

== International career ==
Roberts won 22 caps with Wales having previously represented Wales at under 23 level.

On 15 December 1976, he captained Wales under 21s as an over-age player in the team's first ever match: a goalless draw in a friendly against England at Wolverhampton Wanderers' Molineux Stadium.

== Later career ==
He went on to work as a stationery salesman and as a driving instructor.

Roberts' death at the age of 69 was reported on 4 January 2016.
