= Ray Fairfax =

English football defender

Personal information
- Full name: Raymond John Fairfax
- Date of birth: 14 November 1941 (age 84)
- Place of birth: Smethwick, England
- Position: Defender

Senior career*
Years	Team	Apps	(Gls)
1962–1968	West Bromwich Albion	81	(0)
1968–1971	Northampton Town	116	(2)
1971	Wellingborough Town		
1972	Olney Town		
Total		197	(2)
- * Club domestic league appearances and goals

Raymond John Fairfax (born 14 November 1941) is an English former footballer who played for Northampton Town and West Bromwich Albion.

== Honours ==
West Bromwich Albion

- Football League Cup: 1965–66
