= Eric Weaver (footballer) =

Welsh footballer

Personal information
- Full name: Eric Weaver
- Date of birth: 1 July 1943 (age 83)
- Place of birth: Rhymney, Wales
- Position: Outside right

Senior career*
Years	Team	Apps	(Gls)
- Trowbridge Town
1961–1967	Swindon Town	55	(6)
1967–1968	Notts County	17	(4)
1968–1970	Northampton Town	63	(9)
1970–1971	Boston United		
- Telford United
Total		135	(19)
- * Club domestic league appearances and goals

Eric Weaver (born 1 July 1943) was a Welsh footballer who played as an outside right in the Football League.

His son is Jason Weaver, a former classic winning jockey who works as a presenter on Sky Sports Racing and ITV Racing. His daughter is Samantha Weaver, an Emmy award winning make-up artist working and living in Los Angeles, CA.
