= Frank Rankmore =

Welsh footballer (1939–2022)

Personal information
- Full name: Frank Edward John Rankmore
- Date of birth: 21 July 1939
- Place of birth: Cardiff, Wales
- Date of death: 20 November 2022 (aged 83)
- Position: Defender

Senior career*
Years	Team	Apps	(Gls)
1957–1963	Cardiff City	67	(0)
1963–1968	Peterborough United	201	(7)
1968–1971	Northampton Town	103	(15)
Total		371	(22)

International career
1966	Wales	1	(0)
- * Club domestic league appearances and goals

Frank Edward John Rankmore (21 July 1939 – 20 November 2022) was a Welsh professional footballer who played as a defender for Cardiff City, Peterborough United, and Northampton Town. At international level, he made one appearance for the Wales national team.

== Career ==
Rankmore was born in Cardiff and began his league career at Cardiff City after joining the club from local side Cardiff Corinthians in 1957. He was unable to break into the first team, and his early time at Ninian Park was spent mostly in the reserve side. At the end of the 1959–60 season he was placed on the transfer list. However, when Danny Malloy left the club in 1961, Rankmore found himself promoted to the first-team, making 37 league appearances during his first full season but was unable to prevent the club slipping out of Division One. After one more season as a first-team regular, Rankmore found himself out of favour again following the arrival of John Charles from Roma and was sold to Division Three side Peterborough United for a fee of £10,000.

Rankmore went on to appear over 200 times for Peterborough and was awarded his first, and only, cap for Wales when he played against Chile during a tour of South America in 1966. In 1968, he was sold to local rivals Northampton Town for £12,000, becoming the third Peterborough player to move to Northampton in the space of five months after Johnny Byrne and Jack Fairbrother, where he made over 100 appearances before injury forced him into retirement in 1971.

== Personal life and death ==
Rankmore died on 20 November 2022, at the age of 83.
