= Frank Large =

English footballer (1940–2003)

Personal information
- Date of birth: 26 January 1940
- Place of birth: Leeds, England
- Date of death: 8 August 2003 (aged 63)
- Place of death: Louisburgh, County Mayo, Ireland
- Position: Centre forward

Senior career*
Years	Team	Apps	(Gls)
1958–1962	Halifax Town	133	(50)
1962	Queens Park Rangers	18	(5)
1962–1963	Northampton Town	47	(30)
1963–1964	Swindon Town	17	(4)
1964–1966	Carlisle United	51	(18)
1966	Oldham Athletic	34	(18)
1966–1967	Northampton Town	37	(15)
1967–1968	Leicester City	26	(8)
1968–1969	Fulham	24	(3)
1969–1972	Northampton Town	136	(43)
1972–1973	Chesterfield	46	(15)
1974	Baltimore Comets	17	(9)
Total		(586)	(218)
- * Club domestic league appearances and goals

Frank Large (26 January 1940 – 8 August 2003) was an English footballer who played for many different clubs between 1958 and 1974, including three different spells at Northampton Town. He was part of the package deal that took Allan Clarke from Fulham to Leicester City; he himself moved in the opposite direction. On his retirement, Large helped his son manage Westport United and Ballina Town, and played cricket for County Mayo Cricket Club. His son Paul Frank Large is Co-ordinator for Youth Reach in Ballina, County Mayo, and the author of Have Boots Will Travel – The Story of Frank Large (Pitch Publishing, 2014 ISBN 978-1909626287).
