= John Clarke (footballer, born 1946) =

English footballer

Personal information
- Full name: John Leslie Clarke
- Date of birth: 23 October 1946
- Place of birth: Northampton, England
- Date of death: 1 January 2011 (aged 64)
- Place of death: Northampton, England
- Position: Defender

Senior career*
Years	Team	Apps	(Gls)
1965–1975	Northampton Town	233	(1)

International career
- England Youth
- * Club domestic league appearances and goals

John Leslie Clarke (23 October 1946 – 1 January 2011) was an English professional footballer who played as a central defender. Clarke was a one-club man who played his entire career with his home-town club, Northampton Town.

== Career ==
John "Nobby" Clarke won youth International honours for England in the early 1960s, before Northampton Town manager Dave Bowen signed him on in the summer of 1965 beating Leeds United to his signature. He played (and scored) in the side that lost 8–2 to Manchester United in 1970. Overall he made 262 league and cup appearances for the club, with his only goal coming in his penultimate season, when he scored against Barnsley. He retired due to injury in 1974 and was awarded a testimonial against Leicester City. Following his professional football career, Clarke took over as manager of British Timken's football team. He was also a talented cricketer a once turned out for the Northamptonshire Second XI.

== Death ==
Clarke died in 2011 on New Year's Day after suffering a heart attack.
