= John Fairbrother =

English footballer (born 1941)

Personal information
- Full name: John Fairbrother
- Date of birth: 12 February 1941 (age 85)
- Place of birth: Cricklewood, England
- Position: Centre forward

Youth career
- Bennetts End
- 1958–1959: Luton Town

Senior career*
Years	Team	Apps	(Gls)
1959–1963	Watford	40	(19)
1963–1965	Worcester City		(51)
1965–1968	Peterborough United	72	(37)
1968–1971	Northampton Town	140	(56)
1971–1973	Mansfield Town	85	(38)
1973–1974	Torquay United	15	(3)
1974–1976	Bath City		(31)
1976–1978	Barnet	83	(40)
1978–19??	Hemel Hempstead		
- Berkhamsted Town
- Leverstock Green
- * Club domestic league appearances and goals

John Fairbrother (born 12 February 1941) is an English former footballer who played as a centre forward. He scored 153 goals from 352 appearances in the Football League playing for Watford, Peterborough United, Northampton Town, Mansfield Town and Torquay United. He also played in the Southern League for Worcester City, Bath City and Barnet, and continued his non-league football career with Hemel Hempstead, Berkhamsted Town and Leverstock Green. He continued playing with Garston veterans into his early 50s.

== Life and career ==
Fairbrother was born in 1941 in Cricklewood, London, and moved to Hemel Hempstead, Hertfordshire, in 1953. He played youth football in the Hemel area and spent the 1958–59 season with Luton Town's junior side before moving to Watford. He scored four goals on his debut for Watford's reserves and signed professional forms immediately afterwards. He was prolific in the reserves, but did not make his senior debut until October 1960, when he scored in a 5–2 loss to Derby County in the League Cup. His first appearance in the Third Division came on 12 November against Hull City, and he scored his first Football League goal a week later in a 1–1 draw with Reading. He played increasingly regularly in the 1961–62 season, but his progress was interrupted when he broke a leg during a match in February 1962, just before his 21st birthday. Watford confirmed immediately that he would be retained for the following season and would be kept on first-team wages during his recovery. He scored five goals in the first four matches of 1962–63, but soon dropped out of the side, and finished the season with 22 goals from 45 matches in all competitions over his three-year Watford career.

After two seasons with Worcester City, during which he scored 51 Southern League goals, and 87 in all competitions, Fairbrother joined Peterborough United for a £5000 fee. Worcester did not want to sell, and their supporters' club offered to pay £2000 towards keeping him, but the player was determined to return to the Football League. He spent three months short of three seasons with the Third Division club, and top scored in the second and third.

In February 1968, Fairbrother began three and a half years with Northampton Town – one-and-a-half in the Third Division and two in the fourth – during which he was a first-team regular, top-scored in all three complete seasons, and was ever-present in 1969–70 with 56 appearances, which included an FA Cup fifth round match in which Fairbrother had two chances to open the scoring for Northampton. The first chance was a one-on-one with the keeper but Fairbrother was fouled on the edge of penalty area. The second chance came after Stepney pushed the ball onto the post but the angle was to narrow for Fairbrother to score. George Best scored six goals in Manchester United's 8–2 win. Mansfield Town signed Fairbrother a month into their 1971–72 season in the Third Division, at which point they had not scored a league goal at home. That state of affairs continued until 18 December when, in their tenth home league match of the season, after a Football League record 833 goalless minutes, Fairbrother's headed goal tied the scores with Plymouth Argyle; Mansfield still lost the match, and went on to be relegated. He top-scored both that season and the next; in 1972–73, he had 17 league goals by Christmas, but managed only 3 more in the second half of the season as Mansfield narrowly failed to gain promotion. Fairbrother's Football League career ended with an unproductive season with Torquay United in the Fourth Division.

Fairbrother made 65 appearances in all competitions in his first season with Bath City and scored 41 goals, of which 20 came in the Southern League Premier Division; he added a further 11 league goals in 1975–76. He then moved on to Barnet, where in his first season he top-scored with 22 league goals, won the club's Player of the Year award, and helped Barnet win the Southern League Division One South title. He was again top scorer in league competition in 1977–78, but Jimmy Greaves had one more in all competitions. He made his last Barnet appearance on 9 December 1978, and finished off his career back in the Hemel area with Hemel Hempstead, Berkhamsted Town and Leverstock Green.

Fairbrother worked for a family building firm in the Hemel area before retiring.
