= 1990–91 Colchester United F.C. season =

Colchester United
1990–91 season
- Chairman: Jonathan Crisp
- Manager: Ian Atkins
- Stadium: Layer Road
- Conference: 2nd
- FA Cup: 2nd round (eliminated by Leyton Orient)
- FA Trophy: Quarter-final (eliminated by Witton Albion)
- Bob Lord Trophy: 3rd round (eliminated by Sutton United)
- Top goalscorer: League: Mario Walsh (17); All: Mario Walsh (18)
- Highest home attendance: 7,221 v Altrincham, 20 April 1991
- Lowest home attendance: 1,966 v Northwich Victoria, 1 September 1990
- Average home league attendance: 3,196
- Biggest win: 4–0 v Carlisle United, 6 March 1990
- Biggest defeat: 0–3 v Merthyr Tydfil, 15 December 1990; 1–4 v Leyton Orient, 17 December 1990
Home colours

The 1990–91 season was Colchester United's 49th season in their history and their first season outside of the Football League for 40 years following relegation from the Fourth Division the season prior. Now competing in the Conference, the fifth tier of English football and the highest level on non-League football in England, the club also participated in the FA Cup, the FA Trophy and the Bob Lord Trophy.

Ian Atkins took over from Mick Mills as manager for Colchester's first season in the Conference. The club remained fully professional in their bid to return to the Football League at the first attempt. They fell agonisingly short, just two-points shy of champions and promoted Barnet.

Colchester were knocked out by Leyton Orient in the second round of the FA Cup. They reached the quarter-final of the FA Trophy, losing to Witton Albion, while they also suffered defeat to Sutton United in the Bob Lord Trophy.

== Season overview ==
Ian Atkins was appointed as the manager charged with returning Colchester United to the Football League at the first attempt, like Lincoln City and Darlington had prior to them. Atkins registered as a player, while the club reinstated its historic navy and white striped kits. To help clear club debts, Layer Road was sold back to the Council for £1.2m with the club leasing it back for a maximum of three seasons.

Colchester started the season with a 100 per cent record from their opening six home games, but it took the U's until April to reach top spot in the Conference table. Both Barnet and Kettering Town were Colchester's main title challengers throughout the season.

In the FA Cup, United were dispatched by League opposition Leyton Orient following a 0–0 draw at Layer Road. The O's beat the U's 4–1 at Brisbane Road. Colchester reached the quarter-final of the FA Trophy in their first time playing in the competition, beaten by Witton Albion. In the Bob Lord Trophy, Sutton United saw off Colchester in the third round of the competition.

In the closing weeks of the Conference season, Layer Road attracted a season record 7,221 crowd for the visit of late promotion pushers Altrincham. The U's could only manage a 1–1 draw, and with Barnet improving on Colchester's results until the close of the season pipped United to the Conference title by two points.

Chairman Jonathan Crisp was left fuming:

To come second with a fully professional squad in a part-time league is a bloody disgrace.

During the summer he left the club, handing over to new chairman James Bowdidge, while Atkins also left the club to rejoin Birmingham City as player-assistant manager.

== Players ==
As of match played 4 May 1991.

Name	Position	Nationality	Place of birth	Date of birth	Apps	Goals	Signed from	Date signed	Fee
Goalkeepers
Scott Barrett	GK	(England)	Ilkeston	2 April 1963 (aged 27)	13	0	(England) Stoke City	Summer 1990	£25,000
Defenders
Ian Atkins	CB	(England)	Birmingham	16 January 1957 (aged 33)	0	0	(England) Birmingham City	1 June 1990	Free transfer
Marcelle Bruce	FB	(United States)	Detroit	15 March 1971 (aged 19)	31	1	Apprentice	Summer 1989	Free transfer
Shaun Elliott	CB	(England)	Haltwhistle	26 January 1957 (aged 33)	0	0	(England) Blackpool	15 December 1990 (Note: Date of signing refers to the date of the player's first game for the club)	£7,000
Tony English	DF/MF	(England)	Luton	19 October 1966 (aged 23)	260	33	(England) Coventry City	24 December 1984	Free transfer
Martin Grainger	FB	(England)	Enfield Town	23 August 1972 (aged 17)	8	2	Apprentice	16 December 1989	Free transfer
Neale Marmon	CB	(England)	Bournemouth	21 April 1961 (aged 29)	22	4	(Germany) Hannover 96	20 January 1990	Nominal
Gary Osbourne	FB	(England)	Wolverhampton	22 October 1969 (aged 20)	0	0	(England) Stourbridge	March 1991	Undisclosed
Midfielders
Eamonn Collins	MF	(Republic of Ireland)	Dublin	22 October 1965 (aged 24)	45	3	(England) Portsmouth	May 1989	Free transfer
Warren Donald	MF/FB	(England)	Hillingdon	7 October 1964 (aged 25)	0	0	(England) Northampton Town	27 August 1990	Free transfer
Wayne Hannigan	MF	(Republic of Ireland)			0	0	(Republic of Ireland) Home Farm	26 February 1991	Undisclosed
Mark Kinsella	MF	(Republic of Ireland)	Dublin	12 August 1972 (aged 17)	9	0	(Republic of Ireland) Home Farm	18 August 1989	Free transfer
Nicky Smith	LM	(England)	Berkeley	28 January 1969 (aged 21)	0	0	(England) Southend United	18 August 1990	Free transfer
Forwards
Gary Bennett	WG	(England)	Enfield Town	13 November 1970 (aged 19)	51	7	(England) Tottenham Hotpsur	21 October 1988	Free transfer
Roy McDonough	FW	(England)	Solihull	16 October 1958 (aged 31)	111	26	(England) Southend United	13 October 1990 (Note: Date of signing refers to the date of the player's first game in his second spell for the club)	Part exchange
Steve McGavin	FW	(England)	North Walsham	24 January 1969 (aged 21)	0	0	(England) Sudbury Town	1 April 1991	£10,000
Steve Restarick	FW	(England)	Barking	28 November 1971 (aged 18)	1	0	(England) West Ham United	Early 1988–89 season	Free transfer
Mario Walsh	FW	(England)	Paddington	19 January 1966 (aged 24)	51	17	(England) Southend United	1 September 1990	£25,000

== Transfers ==
=== In ===
Date	Position	Nationality	Name	From	Fee	Ref.
Summer 1990	GK	(England)	Scott Barrett	(England) Stoke City	£25,000	
1 June 1990	CB	(England)	Ian Atkins	(England) Birmingham City	Free transfer (Note: Joined as player-manager)	
27 August 1990	MF/FB	(England)	Warren Donald	(England) Northampton Town	Free transfer	(Note: Date of signing refers to the date of the player's first game for the club)
1 September 1990	FW	(England)	Mario Walsh	(England) Southend United	£25,000	(Note: Date of signing refers to the date of the player's first game in his second spell for the club)
3 September 1990	WG	(England)	Mark Rees	(England) Walsall	Free transfer	
18 September 1990	FW	(Wales)	Morrys Scott	(Wales) Cardiff City	Undisclosed	
18 September 1990	LM	(England)	Nicky Smith	(England) Southend United	Free transfer	
13 October 1990	FW	(England)	Roy McDonough	(England) Southend United	Part exchange with Morrys Scott	
December 1990	FW	(England)	Laurie Ryan	(England) Cambridge United	Free transfer	
15 December 1990	CB	(England)	Shaun Elliott	(England) Blackpool	£7,000 (Note: Fee set at tribunal)	
21 January 1991	MF	(England)	Garry Brooke	(England) Brentford	Trial	
26 February 1991	MF	(Republic of Ireland)	Wayne Hannigan	(Republic of Ireland) Home Farm	Undisclosed	
March 1991	FB	(England)	Gary Osbourne	(England) Stourbridge	Undisclosed	
1 April 1991	FW	(England)	Steve McGavin	(England) Sudbury Town	£10,000	

- Total spending: ▼ ~ £67,000

=== Out ===
Date	Position	Nationality	Name	To	Fee	Ref.
End of season	MF	(England)	Robbie Devereux	(England) Sudbury Town	Released	
Summer 1990	CB	(England)	Billy Gilbert	(England) Maidstone United (Note: Following Billy Gilbert's release by Colchester United, he later signed for Maidstone United.)	Released	
Summer 1990	FW	(England)	Trevor Morgan	(Hong Kong) Happy Valley	Released	
27 August 1990	FW	(Wales)	Morrys Scott	(England) Southend United	Part exchange with Roy McDonough	(Note: Date of departure refers to the date of the player's final game for the club)
22 September 1990	WG	(England)	Mark Rees	Unknown Luxembourg club	Released	
December 1990	FB	(England)	Clive Stafford	(England) Bury Town	Free transfer	
21 January 1991	MF	(England)	Garry Brooke	(England) Brentford	End of trial	
31 March 1991	MF	(England)	Mark Radford	Free agent	Released	
After March 1991	CB	(England)	John Pollard	(England) Bury Town	Released	
April 1991	MF	(England)	Les Taylor	(England) Oxford United	Released	(Note: Joined Oxford United as coach)
26 April 1991	CB	(England)	Scott Daniels	(England) Exeter City	£50,000	
4 May 1991	FW	(England)	Laurie Ryan	(England) Cambridge City	Released	

- Total incoming: ▲ ~ £50,000

=== Loans in ===
Date	Position	Nationality	Name	From	End date	Ref.
18 August 1990	MF	(England)	Mark Yates	(England) Birmingham City	2 February 1991	(Note: Loan start and end dates refer to the date of the player's first and final games for the club)
September 1990	FW	(England)	Laurie Ryan	(England) Cambridge United	29 September 1990	(Note: Loan end date refers to the date of the player's final game in his first spell for the club)
24 November 1990	FW	(United States)	Mike Masters	(United States) San Francisco Bay Blackhawks	25 March 1991	
30 March 1991	CB	(England)	Rudi Hedman	(England) Crystal Palace	4 May 1991	(Note: Loan start and end dates refer to the date of the player's first and final games in his second spell for the club)
30 March 1991	FW	(England)	Dave Leworthy	(England) Reading	30 April 1991	

=== Loans out ===
Date	Position	Nationality	Name	To	End date	Ref.
Autumn 1990	FW	(England)	Steve Restarick	(England) Bury Town	Autumn 1990	
October 1990	FB	(England)	Clive Stafford	(England) Bury Town	October 1990	
March 1991	CB	(England)	John Pollard	(England) Fisher Athletic	March 1991	
March 1991	FW	(England)	Steve Restarick	(England) Fisher Athletic	March 1991	

== Match details ==
=== Pre-season friendly ===
11 August 1990 Friendly	Colchester United	0–1	Crystal Palace	Colchester
		Report	Unknown goalscorer	Stadium: Layer Road

=== Conference ===
==== League table ====
Pos	Team	Pld	W	D	L	GF	GA	GD	Pts	Promotion or relegation
1	Barnet (C, P)	42	26	9	7	103	52	+51	87	Promotion to the Football League Fourth Division
2	Colchester United	42	25	10	7	68	35	+33	85	
3	Altrincham	42	23	13	6	87	46	+41	82	
4	Kettering Town	42	23	11	8	67	45	+22	80	
5	Wycombe Wanderers	42	21	11	10	75	46	+29	74	

(C) Champions; (P) Promoted

==== Results round by round ====
Round	1	2	3	4	5	6	7	8	9	10	11	12	13	14	15	16	17	18	19	20	21	22	23	24	25	26	27	28	29	30	31	32	33	34	35	36	37	38	39	40	41	42
Ground	A	A	H	A	H	A	H	A	H	A	A	H	A	H	H	A	H	A	A	A	H	H	A	H	A	A	H	A	H	H	H	A	H	A	A	H	H	H	A	A	H	H
Result	L	D	W	D	W	D	W	W	W	W	L	W	W	W	W	L	D	W	L	W	D	W	W	W	D	W	W	W	W	D	W	L	L	W	D	W	W	D	D	L	W	W
Position	20	18	10	11	6	8	6	3	3	3	3	3	3	3	3	3	3	3	3	3	3	3	2	2	2	2	4	3	3	2	2	2	4	3	3	1	1	1	2	2	2	2

Source: Statto.com (archived)
A = Away; H = Home; W = Win; D = Draw; L = Loss

==== Matches ====
18 August 1990 1	Yeovil Town	2–0	Colchester United	Yeovil
	Spencer 20'; Conning 74'	Report		Stadium: Huish Park; Attendance: 4,169

22 August 1990 2	Welling United	1–1	Colchester United	Welling
	Clemmence 38'	Report	Yates 76'	Stadium: Park View Road; Attendance: 1,828; Referee: M Daughtery

25 August 1990 3	Colchester United	3–1	Merthyr Tydfil	Colchester
15:00 BST	Yates 9'; Bennett 45'; Collins 56'	Report	Unknown goalscorer	Stadium: Layer Road; Attendance: 2,008; Referee: D Madgewick

27 August 1990 4	Fisher Athletic	0–0	Colchester United	Rotherhithe
		Report		Stadium: Surrey Docks Stadium; Attendance: 1,395; Referee: D Orr

1 September 1990 5	Colchester United	4–0	Northwich Victoria	Colchester
	Walsh 8', 73'; Yates 15'; English 48'	Report		Stadium: Layer Road; Attendance: 1,966; Referee: P Vosper

8 September 1990 6	Barrow	2–2	Colchester United	Barrow-in-Furness
	Cowperthwaite 18', 21'	Report	Walsh 5'; Yates 76'	Stadium: Holker Street; Attendance: 1,441; Referee: J Parker

15 September 1990 7	Colchester United	2–0	Telford United	Colchester
15:00 BST	Daniels 3'; Walsh 25'	Report		Stadium: Layer Road; Attendance: 2,164; Referee: B Foreman

19 September 1990 8	Boston United	1–3	Colchester United	Boston
	Cavell 60'	Report	Walsh 15', 87'; Bennett 38'	Stadium: York Street; Attendance: 1,620; Referee: M Swift

22 September 1990 9	Colchester United	3–1	Cheltenham Town	Colchester
	Atkins 23' (pen.); Bennett 49'; Walsh 90'	Report	Buckland 10'; Burns (red card) 60'	Stadium: Layer Road; Attendance: 2,527; Referee: M Alexander

29 September 1990 10	Runcorn	0–3	Colchester United	Runcorn
		Report	Atkins 7', 88' (pen.); Marmon 16'	Stadium: Canal Street; Attendance: 861; Referee: Andy Davies

6 October 1990 11	Macclesfield Town	1–0	Colchester United	Macclesfield
	Heesom 80'	Report		Stadium: Moss Rose; Attendance: 1,100; Referee: Jeff Winter

13 October 1990 12	Colchester United	1–0	Sutton United	Colchester
15:00 BST	Bennett 35'	Report		Stadium: Layer Road; Attendance: 2,716; Referee: C Proud

20 October 1990 13	Bath City	1–2	Colchester United	Bath
	Randall 78'	Report	Atkins 1' (pen.); Yates 16'	Stadium: Twerton Park; Attendance: 1,078; Referee: B Baker

27 October 1990 14	Colchester United	1–0	Barrow	Colchester
	Walsh 35'	Report		Stadium: Layer Road; Attendance: 2,650; Referee: L Short

3 November 1990 15	Colchester United	2–0	Stafford Rangers	Colchester
15:00 GMT	Walsh 2'; English 32'	Report		Stadium: Layer Road; Attendance: 2,403; Referee: C Finch

10 November 1990 16	Kettering Town	1–0	Colchester United	Kettering
	Keast 10'	Report		Stadium: Rockingham Road; Attendance: 5,020; Referee: Graham Poll

24 November 1990 17	Colchester United	2–2	Wycombe Wanderers	Colchester
	Yates 69'; Walsh 80'	Report	Ryan 32', 77'	Stadium: Layer Road; Attendance: 2,970; Referee: W Norbury

1 December 1990 18	Stafford Rangers	0–2	Colchester United	Stafford
		Report	Marmon 7'; McDonough 8' (yellow card) 43' (red card) 80'	Stadium: Marston Road; Attendance: 1,304; Referee: B Rudkin

15 December 1990 19	Merthyr Tydfil	3–0	Colchester United	Merthyr Tydfil
	Green 8', 12', 77'	Report		Stadium: Penydarren Park; Attendance: 710; Referee: A Danskin

22 December 1990 20	Cheltenham Town	1–2	Colchester United	Cheltenham
	Casey 2'	Report	English 7'; Walsh 39'	Stadium: Whaddon Road; Attendance: 1,397; Referee: Rob Harris

26 December 1990 21	Colchester United	0–0	Barnet	Colchester
11:00 GMT		Report		Stadium: Layer Road; Attendance: 3,946; Referee: J Moore

29 December 1990 22	Colchester United	3–1	Boston United	Colchester
15:00 GMT	Collins 39'; English 45'; Walsh 71'	Report	Unknown goalscorer	Stadium: Layer Road; Attendance: 2,416; Referee: D Orr

1 January 1991 23	Barnet	1–3	Colchester United	Chipping Barnet
15:00 GMT	Poole 64' (pen.)	Report	Bennett 9'; Walsh 57'; Masters 87'	Stadium: Underhill Stadium; Attendance: 5,105; Referee: Dermot Gallagher

5 January 1991 24	Colchester United	2–1	Slough Town	Colchester
15:00 GMT	Bennett 16'; Walsh 22'	Report	Unknown goalscorer	Stadium: Layer Road; Attendance: 2,175; Referee: H Brown

19 January 1991 25	Altrincham	2–2	Colchester United	Altrincham
	McKenna 14'; Shaw 32'	Report	English 68'; McDonough 90'	Stadium: Moss Lane; Attendance: 1,388; Referee: R Sheppard

26 January 1991 26	Sutton United	0–1	Colchester United	Sutton
		Report	McDonough 9'	Stadium: Gander Green Lane; Attendance: 1,496; Referee: S Tomlin

2 March 1991 27	Colchester United	2–0	Bath City	Colchester
15:00 GMT	Atkins 23' (pen.); Walsh 72'	Report		Stadium: Layer Road; Attendance: 2,277; Referee: R Tye

5 March 1991 28	Slough Town	0–2	Colchester United	Slough
19:30 GMT		Report	McDonough 38', 79'	Stadium: Wexham Park Stadium; Attendance: 1,120; Referee: G Bargery

9 March 1991 29	Colchester United	1–0	Macclesfield Town	Colchester
15:00 GMT	Atkins 33' (pen.)	Report		Stadium: Layer Road; Attendance: 2,735; Referee: D Madgewick

12 March 1991 30	Colchester United	2–2	Runcorn	Colchester
19:30 GMT	Ryan 55'; Bennett 60'	Report	Saunders 36'; Byrne 69'	Stadium: Layer Road; Attendance: 2,969; Referee: I Mitchell

23 March 1991 31	Colchester United	2–1	Fisher Athletic	Colchester
15:00 GMT	McDonough 26'; Walsh 79'	Report	Martin 72'	Stadium: Layer Road; Attendance: 2,493; Referee: C Proud

25 March 1991 32	Wycombe Wanderers	1–0	Colchester United	High Wycombe
19:30 GMT	Scott 37'	Report		Stadium: Adams Park; Attendance: 3,200; Referee: A Murphy

30 March 1991 33	Colchester United	0–1	Yeovil Town	Colchester
15:00 GMT		Report	Batty 67'	Stadium: Layer Road; Attendance: 3,115; Referee: G Pearson

1 April 1991 34	Gateshead	1–2	Colchester United	Gateshead
15:00 BST	Granycombe 38'	Report	Leworthy 6'; McDonough 77'	Stadium: Gateshead International Stadium; Attendance: 753; Referee: D Oliver

5 April 1991 35	Northwich Victoria	2–2	Colchester United	Northwich
19:30 BST	O'Connor 43'; Blain 90' (pen.)	Report	Walsh 23'; McDonough 58'	Stadium: Drill Field; Attendance: 1,094; Referee: K Whittaker

9 April 1991 36	Colchester United	2–1	Welling United	Colchester
19:45 BST	Atkins 14' (pen.); English 62'	Report	Hone 65' (pen.)	Stadium: Layer Road; Attendance: 2,889; Referee: C Finch

17 April 1991 37	Colchester United	3–1	Kettering Town	Colchester
19:30 BST	Bennett 52'; English 60'; Donald 62'	Report	Brown 7'	Stadium: Layer Road; Attendance: 5,048; Referee: Paul Taylor

20 April 1991 38	Colchester United	1–1	Altrincham	Colchester
15:00 BST	Leworthy 6'	Report	Daws 19'	Stadium: Layer Road; Attendance: 7,221; Referee: Gary Willard

22 April 1991 39	Kidderminster Harriers	0–0	Colchester United	Kidderminster
		Report		Stadium: Aggborough Stadium; Attendance: 1,721; Referee: B Millership

26 April 1991 40	Telford United	2–0	Colchester United	Telford
19:30 BST	Hurst 84'; Langford 90'	Report		Stadium: Bucks Head; Attendance: 1,592; Referee: J Everton

30 April 1991 41	Colchester United	3–0	Gateshead	Colchester
19:30 BST	Bennett 38'; Leworthy 45', 78'	Report		Stadium: Layer Road; Attendance: 2,667; Referee: Graham Poll

4 May 1991 42	Colchester United	2–0	Kidderminster Harriers	Colchester
15:00 BST	Ryan 22', 42'	Report		Stadium: Layer Road; Attendance: 3,481; Referee: Dermot Gallagher

=== FA Cup ===
17 November 1990 1st round	Colchester United	2–1	Reading	Colchester
15:00 GMT	Atkins 46' (pen.); Marmon 60'	Report	Hicks 33'	Stadium: Layer Road; Attendance: 3,761; Referee: Alf Buksh

12 December 1990 2nd round	Colchester United	0–0	Leyton Orient	Colchester
20:00 GMT		Report		Stadium: Layer Road; Attendance: 6,150; Referee: R Wiseman

17 December 1990 2nd round replay	Leyton Orient	4–1	Colchester United	Leyton
	Carter 31'; Howard 45'; Pike 51'; Castle 72'	Report	Masters 22'; Grainger (red card) 80'	Stadium: Brisbane Road; Attendance: 4,615; Referee: R Wiseman

=== FA Trophy ===
15 January 1991 1st round	Windsor & Eton	0–1	Colchester United	Windsor
		Report	Bennett 42'	Stadium: Stag Meadow; Attendance: 727; Referee: Graham Poll

2 February 1991 2nd round	Colchester United	2–0	Runcorn	Colchester
15:00 GMT	Walsh 33'; Marmon 81'; Elliott (yellow card) 86' (red card)	Report		Stadium: Layer Road; Attendance: 2,348; Referee: J Moore

23 February 1991 1st round	Colchester United	3–0	Wivenhoe Town	Colchester
15:00 GMT	McDonough 25'; Bennett 57', 68'	Report		Stadium: Layer Road; Attendance: 4,923; Referee: M Bailey

16 March 1991 4th round	Colchester United	0–2	Witton Albion	Colchester
15:00 GMT		Report	Connor 86', 88'	Stadium: Layer Road; Attendance: 3,079; Referee: Peter Jones

=== Bob Lord Trophy ===
21 January 1991 2nd round	Fisher Athletic	2–3 (a.e.t.)	Colchester United	Rotherhithe
	Gorman 7'; Mehmet 106'	Report	Marmon 2'; Restarick 99', 117'	Stadium: Surrey Docks Stadium; Attendance: 293; Referee: G Pearson

26 February 1991 3rd round	Sutton United	2–0	Colchester United	Sutton
	Dennis 13'; Massey 73'	Report		Stadium: Gander Green Lane; Attendance: 582; Referee: D Orr

== Squad statistics ==
=== Appearances and goals ===
No.	Pos	Nat	Player	Total		Conference		FA Cup		FA Trophy		Bob Lord Trophy	
No.	Pos	Nat	Player	Apps	Goals	Apps	Goals	Apps	Goals	Apps	Goals	Apps	Goals
	GK	(England) ENG	Scott Barrett	51	0	42	0	3	0	4	0	2	0
	DF	(England) ENG	Ian Atkins	49	8	41	7	3	1	4	0	1	0
	DF	(United States) USA	Marcelle Bruce	7	0	2+2	0	0+1	0	0	0	2	0
	DF	(England) ENG	Shaun Elliott	22	0	14+5	0	0	0	3	0	0	0
	DF	(England) ENG	Tony English	48	7	39+1	7	3	0	3+1	0	1	0
	DF	(England) ENG	Martin Grainger	8	0	3+2	0	1	0	0+1	0	1	0
	DF	(England) ENG	Neale Marmon	45	5	36+1	2	3	1	2+1	1	2	1
	DF	(England) ENG	Gary Osbourne	6	0	5+1	0	0	0	0	0	0	0
	MF	(Republic of Ireland) IRL	Eamonn Collins	42	2	35	2	3	0	4	0	0	0
	MF	(England) ENG	Warren Donald	46	1	33+5	1	3	0	4	0	1	0
	MF	(Republic of Ireland) IRL	Wayne Hannigan	1	0	0	0	0	0	0	0	0+1	0
	MF	(Republic of Ireland) IRL	Mark Kinsella	12	0	6+5	0	0	0	0	0	1	0
	MF	(England) ENG	Nicky Smith	41	0	34	0	2	0	4	0	1	0
	FW	(England) ENG	Gary Bennett	43	12	34+2	9	1+2	0	4	3	0	0
	FW	(England) ENG	Roy McDonough	29	9	17+7	8	1	0	4	1	0	0
	FW	(England) ENG	Steve McGavin	8	0	2+6	0	0	0	0	0	0	0
	FW	(England) ENG	Steve Restarick	2	2	0	0	0	0	0	0	0+2	2
	FW	(England) ENG	Mario Walsh	38	18	31+1	17	3	0	3	1	0	0
Players who appeared for Colchester who left during the season
	DF	(England) ENG	Scott Daniels	47	1	40	1	3	0	4	0	0	0
	DF	(England) ENG	Rudi Hedman	10	0	10	0	0	0	0	0	0	0
	DF	(England) ENG	John Pollard	2	0	0	0	0	0	0	0	2	0
	MF	(England) ENG	Garry Brooke	1	0	0	0	0	0	0	0	1	0
	MF	(England) ENG	Mark Radford	6	0	1+3	0	0	0	0	0	1+1	0
	MF	(England) ENG	Les Taylor	1	0	0	0	0	0	0	0	1	0
	MF	(England) ENG	Mark Yates	30	6	22+3	6	3	0	0+1	0	1	0
	FW	(England) ENG	Dave Leworthy	9	4	9	4	0	0	0	0	0	0
	FW	(United States) USA	Mike Masters	16	2	2+9	1	1	1	0+2	0	2	0
	FW	(England) ENG	Mark Rees	1	0	0+1	0	0	0	0	0	0	0
	FW	(England) ENG	Laurie Ryan	17	3	3+10	3	0	0	1+1	0	2	0
	FW	(Wales) WAL	Morrys Scott	4	0	1+3	0	0	0	0	0	0	0

=== Goalscorers ===
Place	Nationality	Position	Name	Conference	FA Cup	FA Trophy	Bob Lord Trophy	Total
1	(England)	FW	Mario Walsh	17	0	1	0	18
2	(England)	WG	Gary Bennett	9	0	3	0	12
3	(England)	FW	Roy McDonough	8	0	1	0	9
4	(England)	CB	Ian Atkins	7	1	0	0	8
5	(England)	DF/MF	Tony English	7	0	0	0	7
6	(England)	MF	Mark Yates	6	0	0	0	6
7	(England)	CB	Neale Marmon	2	1	1	1	5
8	(England)	FW	Dave Leworthy	4	0	0	0	4
9	(England)	FW	Laurie Ryan	3	0	0	0	3
10	(Republic of Ireland)	MF	Eamonn Collins	2	0	0	0	2
10	(United States)	FW	Mike Masters	1	1	0	0	2
10	(England)	FW	Steve Restarick	0	0	0	2	2
13	(England)	CB	Scott Daniels	1	0	0	0	1
13	(England)	MF/FB	Warren Donald	1	0	0	0	1
			Own goals	0	0	0	0	0
			TOTALS	68	3	6	3	80

=== Disciplinary record ===
Nationality	Position	Name	Conference		FA Cup		FA Trophy		Bob Lord Trophy		Total	
Nationality	Position	Name	Yellow card	Red card	Yellow card	Red card	Yellow card	Red card	Yellow card	Red card	Yellow card	Red card
(England)	FW	Roy McDonough	3	1	0	0	0	0	0	0	3	1
(England)	CB	Shaun Elliott	0	0	0	0	1	1	0	0	1	1
(England)	FB	Martin Grainger	0	0	0	1	0	0	0	0	0	1
(England)	CB	Neale Marmon	2	0	0	0	0	0	0	0	2	0
(England)	CB	Ian Atkins	0	0	0	0	0	1	0	0	1	0
(Republic of Ireland)	MF	Eamonn Collins	0	0	1	0	0	0	0	0	1	0
(England)	MF/FB	Warren Donald	1	0	0	0	0	0	0	0	1	0
		TOTALS	6	1	1	1	2	1	0	0	9	3

=== Clean sheets ===
Number of games goalkeepers kept a clean sheet.

Place	Nationality	Player	Conference	FA Cup	FA Trophy	Bob Lord Trophy	Total
1	(England)	Scott Barrett	16	1	3	0	20
		TOTALS	16	1	3	0	20

=== Player debuts ===
Players making their first-team Colchester United debut in a fully competitive match.

Position	Nationality	Player	Date	Opponent	Ground	Notes
CB	(England)	Ian Atkins	18 August 1990	Yeovil Town	Huish Park	
GK	(England)	Scott Barrett	18 August 1990	Yeovil Town	Huish Park	(Note: Second debut for the club)
FW	(Wales)	Morrys Scott	18 August 1990	Yeovil Town	Huish Park	
LM	(England)	Nicky Smith	18 August 1990	Yeovil Town	Huish Park	
MF	(England)	Mark Yates	18 August 1990	Yeovil Town	Huish Park	
MF/FB	(England)	Warren Donald	27 August 1990	Fisher Athletic	Surrey Docks Stadium	
FW	(England)	Mario Walsh	1 September 1990	Northwich Victoria	Layer Road	
FW	(England)	Laurie Ryan	19 September 1990	Boston United	York Street	
WG	(England)	Mark Rees	22 September 1990	Cheltenham Town	Layer Road	
FW	(England)	Roy McDonough	13 October 1990	Sutton United	Layer Road	
FW	(United States)	Mike Masters	24 November 1990	Wycombe Wanderers	Layer Road	
CB	(England)	Shaun Elliott	15 December 1990	Merthyr Tydfil	Penydarren Park	
FW	(England)	Laurie Ryan	15 December 1990	Merthyr Tydfil	Penydarren Park	
MF	(England)	Garry Brooke	21 January 1991	Fisher Athletic	Surrey Docks Stadium	
MF	(Republic of Ireland)	Wayne Hannigan	26 February 1991	Sutton United	Gander Green Lane	
CB	(England)	Rudi Hedman	30 March 1991	Yeovil Town	Layer Road	
FW	(England)	Dave Leworthy	30 March 1991	Yeovil Town	Layer Road	
FW	(England)	Steve McGavin	1 April 1991	Gateshead	Gateshead International Stadium	
FB	(England)	Gary Osbourne	1 April 1991	Gateshead	Gateshead International Stadium	

== See also ==
- List of Colchester United F.C. seasons
