= 1985–86 Southampton F.C. season =

Southampton F.C.
1985–86 season
- Chairman: Alan Woodford
- Manager: Chris Nicholl
- Stadium: The Dell
- First Division: 14th
- FA Cup: Semi-final
- League Cup: Fourth round
- Super Cup: Group stage
- Top goalscorer: League: David Armstrong (10); All: David Armstrong (16)
- Highest home attendance: 19,784 v Liverpool (15 March 1986)
- Lowest home attendance: 9,085 v Birmingham City (6 November 1985)
- Average home league attendance: 15,034
- Biggest win: 3–0 v Manchester City (7 September 1985); 3–0 v Queens Park Rangers (26 October 1985); 3–0 v Arsenal (7 December 1985); 3–0 v Wigan Athletic (25 January 1986); 3–0 v Birmingham City (6 November 1985)
- Biggest defeat: 0–7 v Luton Town (19 October 1985)
Home colours	Away colours

The 1985–86 Southampton F.C. season was the club's 85th season of competitive football and their 16th in the First Division of the Football League. Following the departure of Lawrie McMenemy in the summer, 1985–86 was the first season to feature former player Chris Nicholl as manager. The Saints had a disappointing first campaign with Nicholl, finishing 14th in the First Division table – their joint lowest position since their 1979 promotion to the top flight. Outside the league, the club reached the semi-finals of the FA Cup for the second time in three seasons and the fourth round of the League Cup. The team were due to compete in the UEFA Cup, but English sides were banned following the Heysel Stadium disaster. In its place, Southampton played in the only incarnation of the Super Cup, but failed to make it out of the group stage.

Southampton's squad at the start of the 1985–86 campaign remained much the same as the previous season, with full-back Mick Mills the only major departure in the summer. Nicholl signed a number of youth players before the season started, including Matt Le Tissier, and brought in Glenn Cockerill, Jon Gittens and Gerry Forrest later in the season. He also signed goalkeeper Tim Flowers on loan towards the end of the campaign, with the deal made permanent the next summer. The team's league performance was poor throughout most of the season, as they picked up just 12 wins and suffered 20 defeats, failing to climb past 13th in the table and ultimately finishing one place lower – their worst performance since 1978–79. The campaign also included one of the club's heaviest league defeats, as they lost 0–7 to Luton Town.

Outside the league, Southampton performed well in the FA Cup, reaching the semi-finals for the second time in three seasons. After easing past Middlesbrough and Wigan Athletic, the Saints beat Millwall and Brighton & Hove Albion 2–0 in the fifth and sixth rounds, respectively. In the semi-finals, they faced First Division title hopefuls (and eventual winners) Liverpool, losing 0–2 thanks to two goals in extra time. Liverpool went on to win the tournament, beating local rivals Everton in the final. In the League Cup, the Saints edged past Millwall and Birmingham City (after penalties and a replay, respectively), before facing elimination at the hands of Arsenal in the fourth round, again after a replay. In the Super Cup, Southampton were eliminated in the group stage after finishing bottom of their group, with no wins, one draw and three defeats.

Southampton used 27 players during the 1985–86 season and had 13 different goalscorers. Their top scorer was David Armstrong, who scored 16 times in all competitions. Danny Wallace was the club's second-highest scorer with 15 goals, followed by Steve Moran on ten in all competitions. Armstrong featured in the most games during the campaign, missing just one fixture in the league. Goalkeeper Peter Shilton played in all but five league games, and at the end of the season became the first player to win the Southampton F.C. Player of the Season award for a second (and second consecutive) year. The average attendance at The Dell in 1985–86 was 15,034 – a significant drop from the previous year. The highest attendance was 19,784 against Liverpool; the lowest was 12,500 against Nottingham Forest.

== Background and transfers ==
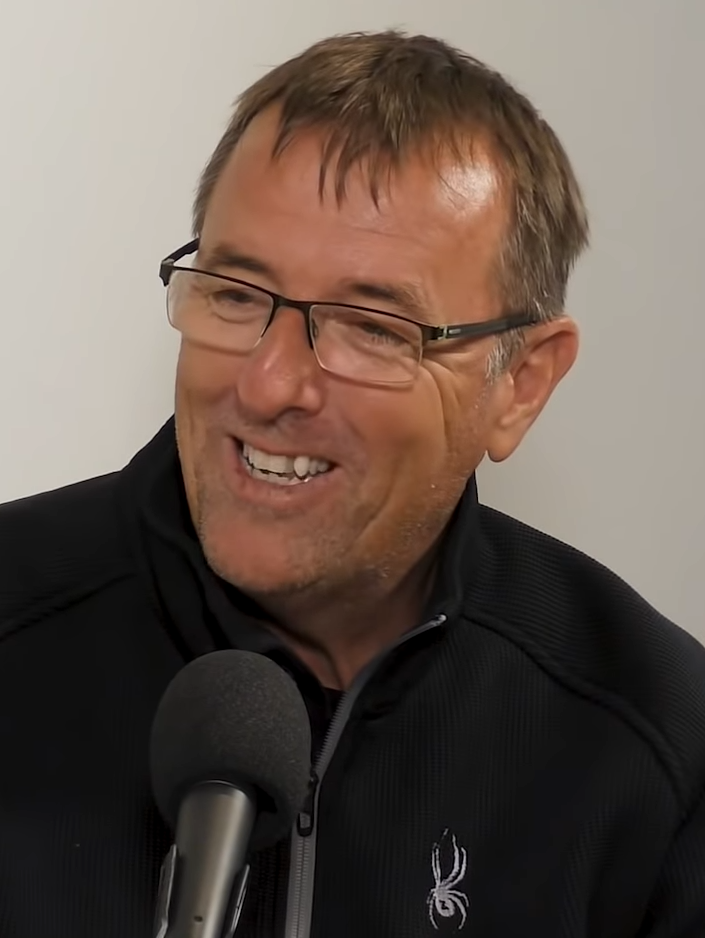
Southampton signed Matt Le Tissier on apprentice terms in May 1985. He would go on to make 540 appearances and score 209 goals – the second highest in the club's history.

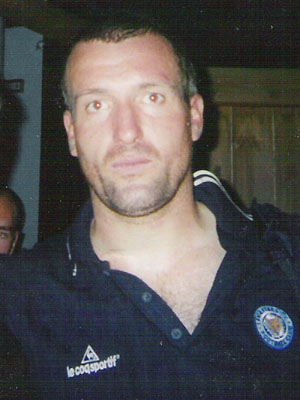
Tim Flowers was signed on loan at the end of the season. His deal was later made permanent and he would go on to play over 250 games.

The summer transfer window ahead of the 1985–86 season was relatively quiet for Southampton. The sole departure was 36-year-old full-back Mick Mills, who left the Saints to take on the role of player-manager at Stoke City. Joining the Saints squad were three youth players. First to join was 16-year-old attacking midfielder Matt Le Tissier, who moved from Vale Recreation in May and signed as an apprentice. He was followed by two 16-year-old left-backs, Allen Tankard and Andy Cook, in June and July, respectively, both of whom joined as part of the Youth Training Scheme. In August, striker Stuart McManus was briefly loaned out to Third Division side Newport County.

In October, with the club having struggled in the league thus far, Southampton signed midfielder Glenn Cockerill from Second Division side Sheffield United for £200,000 and defender Jon Gittens from Midland Combination side Paget Rangers for £5,000. Towards the end of the season, goalkeeper Tim Flowers was brought in on a short-term loan from Third Division strugglers Wolverhampton Wanderers until the end of the season, with the deal made permanent come the summer. Phil Kite was loaned out at the same time to Middlesbrough in the Second Division, while striker Alan Curtis spent a month on loan at Stoke City, under new manager Mills.

Players transferred in

Name	Nationality	Pos.	Club	Date	Fee	Ref.
Matt Le Tissier	England	MF	(England) Vale Recreation	May 1985	Free (Note: Matt Le Tissier signed as an apprentice in May 1985, before turning professional in October 1986.)	
Allen Tankard	England	DF	none (free agent)	June 1985	Free (Note: Allen Tankard signed as a youth player in June 1985, before turning professional in May 1987.)	
Andy Cook	England	DF	none (free agent)	July 1985	Free (Note: Andy Cook signed as a trainee in July 1985, before turning professional in July 1987.)	
Glenn Cockerill	England	MF	(England) Sheffield United	October 1985	£200,000	
Jon Gittens	England	DF	(England) Paget Rangers	October 1985	£5,000	
Gerry Forrest	England	DF	(England) Rotherham United	December 1985	£100,000	
Phil Parkinson	England	MF	none (free agent)	December 1985	Free	

Players transferred out

Name	Nationality	Pos.	Club	Date	Fee	Ref.
Mick Mills	England	DF	(England) Stoke City	May 1985	Free	

Players loaned in

Name	Nationality	Pos.	Club	Date from	Date to	Ref.
Tim Flowers	England	GK	(England) Wolverhampton Wanderers	March 1986	End of season	

Players loaned out

Name	Nationality	Pos.	Club	Date from	Date to	Ref.
Stuart McManus	Scotland	FW	(England) Newport County	August 1985	September 1985	
Alan Curtis	Wales	FW	(England) Stoke City	February 1986	March 1986	
Phil Kite	England	GK	(England) Middlesbrough	March 1986	End of season	

== Pre-season friendlies ==
Prior to the start of the 1985–86 season, Southampton played seven friendlies. The first three were as part of a short West Indies tour, during which they beat domestic league rivals Manchester United 1–0, the Trinidad and Tobago under-21 team 7–3, and local side Trintoc 4–0. Upon their return to England, the Saints thrashed Alliance Premier League side Weymouth 6–0 in a testimonial match and faced three Third Division sides – beating Bristol Rovers 2–0, losing 0–1 to Brentford, and holding Plymouth Argyle to a goalless draw.

24 May 1985 Friendly	Manchester United	0–1	Southampton
			Lawrence

26 May 1985 Friendly	Trinidad and Tobago U21	3–7	Southampton
			Armstrong; Puckett; Jordan

28 May 1985 Friendly	(Trinidad and Tobago) Trintoc	0–4	Southampton
			Jordan; Case; Lawrence

27 July 1985 Lawrence & Arnold Testimonial	Weymouth	0–6	Southampton	Weymouth
			Puckett; Wallace; Case own goal

31 July 1985 Friendly	Bristol Rovers	0–2	Southampton	Bristol
			Armstrong; Moran	Stadium: Eastville Stadium

7 August 1985 Friendly	Brentford	1–0	Southampton	London
				Stadium: Griffin Park

12 August 1985 Friendly	Plymouth Argyle	0–0	Southampton	Plymouth
				Stadium: Home Park

== First Division ==
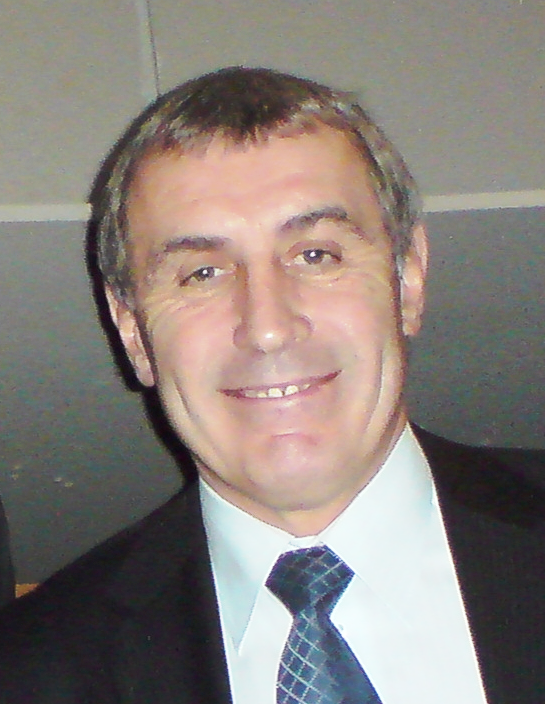
Peter Shilton played well in goal throughout the season to help keep Southampton out of the relegation zone and became the first two-time Player of the Season award winner as a result.

Southampton started their first season under Chris Nicholl poorly, picking up just four points from their first six games and immediately dropping down the table close to the relegation zone. Points were gained in a 1–1 draw on the opening day with Newcastle United, a goalless draw at home to Aston Villa, and consecutive 1–1 draws against Ipswich Town and West Ham United, both of whom had finished within two points of the relegation zone the previous year. David Armstrong quickly established himself as the club's lead goalscorer during the fixtures, scoring four of their first six goals in the league. The team's first win came in September, when they beat the recently promoted Manchester City 3–0 at The Dell, after which Nicholl praised the performance of his defenders. By mid-October, the South Coast side had only picked up one more victory: a 3–1 win over Watford in which Steve Moran scored his fourth league hat-trick for the club (only Ron Davies had scored more in the top flight, with five First Division hat-tricks). A subsequent 0–1 loss at title challengers Liverpool had left the club 17th in the table, after which Nicholl brought in midfielder Glenn Cockerill and defender Jon Gittens to bolster the struggling squad.

After Cockerill and Gittens' arrivals, Southampton faced their heaviest defeat of the season, losing 0–7 to Luton Town at Kenilworth Road. Despite the heavy defeat, the club bounced back with three wins and a draw from their next four games, including a 3–0 victory over Queens Park Rangers, a 1–0 win over last season's third-placed side Tottenham Hotspur, and a 1–0 edging of strugglers Birmingham City. The end of November saw Southampton mark the club's centenary at home to defending league champions Everton, which ended in a close-fought 2–3 loss in which the visitors overturned a 1–2 disadvantage over the last 15 minutes to secure the win. At the beginning of December, Gerry Forrest was signed and the Saints beat Arsenal 3–0 at home, with goals coming from Kevin Bond, Armstrong and Moran. After the last few games of 1985 – two away defeats and a 3–1 win over Nottingham Forest – Southampton had reached a season-high position of 13th in the First Division table.

1986 started with two wins and a draw from four fixtures, including a New Year's Day 3–1 victory over bottom-placed West Bromwich Albion and a 1–0 win over fellow strugglers Ipswich Town. However, it took until mid-March for the Saints to pick up their first win on the road in the league, defeating Queens Park Rangers 2–0 at Loftus Road thanks to goals from debutant Stuart McManus and Cockerill; this would be one of only two away league wins during 1985–86, the other coming five weeks later at Birmingham City who by that point had almost confirmed their relegation to the Second Division. Several marginal 0–1 defeats in the final stages of the season – including against Chelsea, West Bromwich Albion and West Ham United – saw Southampton unable to make it above 14th in the league again, with their position confirmed by defeats against title chasers Everton (1–6) and mid-table side Tottenham Hotspur (3–5) in the final two games of the campaign (during which Keith Granger and Mark Blake made their first team debuts).

=== List of match results ===
17 August 1985 1	Southampton	1–1	Newcastle United	Southampton
	Puckett 42'		Beardsley 49' (pen.)	Stadium: The Dell; Attendance: 16,401

20 August 1985 2	Arsenal	3–2	Southampton	London
	Caton 5'; Robson 47'; Woodcock 67'		Armstrong 65', 82'	Stadium: Arsenal Stadium; Attendance: 21,623

24 August 1985 3	Nottingham Forest	2–1	Southampton	Nottingham
	Metgod 20'; Birtles 44'		Armstrong 63'	Stadium: City Ground; Attendance: 12,643

27 August 1985 4	Southampton	0–0	Aston Villa	Southampton
				Stadium: The Dell; Attendance: 14,220

31 August 1985 5	Ipswich Town	1–1	Southampton	Ipswich
	Cranson 18'		Armstrong 85' (pen.)	Stadium: Portman Road; Attendance: 11,588

3 September 1985 6	Southampton	1–1	West Ham United	Southampton
	Curtis 51'		McAvennie 81'	Stadium: The Dell; Attendance: 14,477

7 September 1985 7	Southampton	3–0	Manchester City	Southampton
	Case 10'; McCarthy 64' (o.g.); Lawrence 83'			Stadium: The Dell; Attendance: 14,308

14 September 1985 8	Chelsea	2–0	Southampton	London
	Dixon 34'; Canoville 79'			Stadium: Stamford Bridge; Attendance: 16,711

21 September 1985 9	Southampton	1–1	Coventry City	Southampton
	Armstrong 71'		Gibson 60'	Stadium: The Dell; Attendance: 12,674

28 September 1985 10	Manchester United	1–0	Southampton	Manchester
	Hughes 77'			Stadium: Old Trafford; Attendance: 52,449

5 October 1985 11	Southampton	3–1	Watford	Southampton
	Moran 17', 23', 70'			Stadium: The Dell; Attendance: 14,172

12 October 1985 12	Liverpool	1–0	Southampton	Liverpool
	McMahon 59'			Stadium: Anfield; Attendance: 32,113

19 October 1985 13	Luton Town	7–0	Southampton	Luton
	Nwajiobi 5'; Stein 31', 55', 89' (pen.); Hill 33'; Preece 59'; Daniel 88'			Stadium: Kenilworth Road; Attendance: 8,896

26 October 1985 14	Southampton	3–0	Queens Park Rangers	Southampton
	Wallace 3', 84'; Cockerill 71'			Stadium: The Dell; Attendance: 15,615

2 November 1985 15	Southampton	1–0	Tottenham Hotspur	Southampton
	Puckett 67'			Stadium: The Dell; Attendance: 17,740

9 November 1985 16	Leicester City	2–2	Southampton	Leicester
	Smith 3'; Lynex 65' (pen.)		Armstrong 30'; Puckett 56'	Stadium: Filbert Street; Attendance: 8,080

16 November 1985 17	Southampton	1–0	Birmingham City	Southampton
	Wallace 67'			Stadium: The Dell; Attendance: 13,167

23 November 1985 18	Sheffield Wednesday	2–1	Southampton	Sheffield
	Chapman 20'; Marwood 70'		Wright 81'	Stadium: Hillsborough Stadium; Attendance: 18,955

30 November 1985 19	Southampton	2–3	Everton	Southampton
	Cockerill 1'; Moran 70'		Lineker 29'; Heath 75'; Steven 82'	Stadium: The Dell; Attendance: 16,917

7 December 1985 20	Southampton	3–0	Arsenal	Southampton
	Bond 29'; Armstrong 65' (pen.); Moran 67'			Stadium: The Dell; Attendance: 15,052

14 December 1985 21	Newcastle United	2–1	Southampton	Newcastle upon Tyne
	Roeder 29'; Beardsley 79'		Moran 69'	Stadium: St James' Park; Attendance: 19,229

20 December 1985 22	Southampton	3–1	Nottingham Forest	Southampton
	Moran 35', 37'; Armstrong 74'		Carr 44'	Stadium: The Dell; Attendance: 12,500

26 December 1985 23	Oxford United	3–0	Southampton	Oxford
	Leworthy 23', 29'; Aldridge 61'			Stadium: Manor Ground; Attendance: 11,266

1 January 1986 24	Southampton	3–1	West Bromwich Albion	Southampton
	Cockerill 47'; Wallace 58'; Armstrong 83'		Varadi 68'	Stadium: The Dell; Attendance: 13,154

11 January 1986 25	Manchester City	1–0	Southampton	Manchester
	Phillips 85'			Stadium: Maine Road; Attendance: 21,674

18 January 1986 26	Southampton	1–0	Ipswich Town	Southampton
	Wallace 50'			Stadium: The Dell; Attendance: 13,164

1 February 1986 27	Aston Villa	0–0	Southampton	Birmingham
				Stadium: Villa Park; Attendance: 8,456

8 February 1986 28	Southampton	1–2	Luton Town	Southampton
	Armstrong 65'		Newell 29'; Stein 88'	Stadium: The Dell; Attendance: 13,740

22 February 1986 29	Coventry City	3–2	Southampton	Coventry
	Brazil 55'; Pickering 58'; Bennett 79'		Wright 17'; Cockerill 38' (pen.)	Stadium: Highfield Road; Attendance: 10,881

1 March 1986 30	Southampton	1–0	Manchester United	Southampton
	Cockerill 81'			Stadium: The Dell; Attendance: 19,012

11 March 1986 31	Queens Park Rangers	0–2	Southampton	London
			McManus 23'; Cockerill 42'	Stadium: Loftus Road; Attendance: 14,521

15 March 1986 32	Southampton	1–2	Liverpool	Southampton
	Lawrence 49'		Wark 53'; Rush 59'	Stadium: The Dell; Attendance: 19,784

22 March 1986 33	Southampton	0–1	Chelsea	Southampton
			Pates 62'	Stadium: The Dell; Attendance: 15,509

29 March 1986 34	West Bromwich Albion	1–0	Southampton	West Bromwich
	Thompson 70'			Stadium: The Hawthorns; Attendance: 7,324

1 April 1986 35	Southampton	1–1	Oxford United	Southampton
	Aldridge 35'		Wright 43'	Stadium: The Dell; Attendance: 15,350

8 April 1986 36	West Ham United	1–0	Southampton	London
	Martin 26'			Stadium: Boleyn Ground; Attendance: 22,531

12 April 1986 37	Southampton	0–0	Leicester City	Southampton
				Stadium: The Dell; Attendance: 13,403

19 April 1986 38	Birmingham City	0–2	Southampton	Birmingham
			Wallace 42'; Cockerill 70'	Stadium: St Andrew's; Attendance: 5,833

26 April 1986 39	Southampton	2–3	Sheffield Wednesday	Southampton
	Case 54'; Wallace 76'		Shutt 6'; Shelton 64'; Hart 89'	Stadium: The Dell; Attendance: 15,365

29 April 1986 40	Watford	1–1	Southampton	Watford
	West 43'		Townsend 12'	Stadium: Vicarage Road; Attendance: 11,868

3 May 1986 41	Everton	6–1	Southampton	Liverpool
	Mountfield 9'; Steven 29'; Lineker 30', 35', 64'; Sharp 51'		Puckett 59'	Stadium: Goodison Park; Attendance: 33,057

5 May 1986 42	Tottenham Hotspur	5–3	Southampton	London
	Waddle 9'; Galvin 29', 35', 50'; Allen 74'		Wallace 22'; Mabbutt 41' (o.g.); Maskell 64'	Stadium: White Hart Lane; Attendance: 13,036

=== Final league table ===
Pos	Team	Pld	W	D	L	GF	GA	GD	Pts
12	Watford	42	16	11	15	69	62	+7	59
13	Queens Park Rangers	42	15	7	20	53	64	−11	52
14	Southampton	42	12	10	20	51	62	−11	46
15	Manchester City	42	11	12	19	43	57	−14	45
16	Aston Villa	42	10	14	18	51	67	−16	44

Source: RSSSF
Rules for classification: 1) Points; 2) Goal difference; 3) Goals scored

=== Results by matchday ===
Round	1	2	3	4	5	6	7	8	9	10	11	12	13	14	15	16	17	18	19	20	21	22	23	24	25	26	27	28	29	30	31	32	33	34	35	36	37	38	39	40	41	42
Ground	H	A	A	H	A	H	H	A	H	A	H	A	A	H	H	A	H	A	H	H	A	H	A	H	A	H	A	H	A	H	A	H	H	A	H	A	H	A	H	A	A	A
Result	D	L	L	D	D	D	W	L	D	L	W	L	L	W	W	D	W	L	L	W	L	W	L	W	L	W	D	L	L	W	W	L	L	L	D	L	D	W	L	D	L	L
Position	15	18	20	19	20	19	14	15	17	20	16	17	18	18	16	15	14	14	15	15	14	13	13	13	14	14	14	14	15	14	13	14	15	15	15	15	15	14	14	14	14	14

Source: 11v11.com
A = Away; H = Home; W = Win; D = Draw; L = Loss

== FA Cup ==
Southampton entered the 1985–86 FA Cup in the third round against Middlesbrough, who were struggling in (and later relegated from) the Second Division. The top-flight side dominated possession and chances early in the game, with Danny Wallace opening the scoring after 11 minutes. Don O'Riordan equalised for the hosts, before Wallace doubled his tally and put the Saints back ahead on 40 minutes from a Glenn Cockerill assist. The visitors continued to apply most of the pressure after the break, with Wallace finally completing a hat-trick and securing his team's first away win in 10 months after 89 minutes.

In the fourth round, Southampton hosted Wigan Athletic, who were vying for promotion from the Third Division. After a first half which saw chances for both sides to break the deadlock, it was the Saints who struck first in the 68th minute through Cockerill, who headed in a cross from David Armstrong to put the top-flight side 1–0 up. It was the season's leading goalscorer Armstrong himself who converted next, first scoring a rebound from a penalty less than five minutes from full-time, then adding a third for his side in the last minute when he headed in a corner from Mark Dennis.

Another home tie followed in the fifth round, this time against Second Division opponents Millwall, past whom the Saints had edged on penalties after two goalless legs in the League Cup just a few months earlier. Like its predecessors, the game ended 0–0 despite being "fiercely contested", with neither side able to convert a chance on goal. In a replay played just over two weeks later at The Den, Southampton finally scored a single goal to beat Millwall and advance to the sixth round – Wallace scored the only goal of the game in the 16th minute, following a "stunning move" involving numerous players.

In their fourth FA Cup quarter-final in ten years, Southampton travelled to face another Second Division side, Brighton & Hove Albion, just five days after the victory over Millwall. Despite the hosts dominating the opening of the game, the Saints scored against the run of play through Steve Moran, who scored for the first time since December after just 14 minutes. The visitors took control of the game after their opening goal, with Cockerill doubling their lead five minutes before half-time. Despite chances aplenty for either side in the second 45 minutes, the score remained 2–0 and Southampton progressed.

Southampton were drawn in their second FA Cup semi-final in three years against defending First Division champions Liverpool, in a tie played at Tottenham Hotspur's stadium White Hart Lane. The Merseyside team enjoyed the majority of early chances, with goalkeeper Peter Shilton and full-back Nick Holmes preventing strong chances on goal. Shortly before half-time, centre-back Mark Wright broke his leg, which prevented him from finishing the season or playing in the upcoming 1986 World Cup. A goalless second half saw the sides progress to extra time, during which talisman Ian Rush scored twice for the Reds to knock Southampton out and send Liverpool through to their seventh FA Cup final (which they would later win, a week after winning the league, securing the double as a result).

13 January 1986 Round 3	Middlesbrough	1–3	Southampton	Middlesbrough
	O'Riordan		Wallace 11', 40', 89'	Stadium: Ayresome Park; Attendance: 12,012

25 January 1986 Round 4	Southampton	3–0	Wigan Athletic	Southampton
	Cockerill 68'; Armstrong 87', 90'			Stadium: The Dell; Attendance: 14,462

15 February 1986 Round 5	Southampton	0–0	Millwall	Southampton
				Stadium: The Dell; Attendance: 16,356

3 March 1986 Round 5 Replay	Millwall	0–1	Southampton	London
			Wallace 16'	Stadium: The Den; Attendance: 10,625

8 March 1986 Round 6	Brighton & Hove Albion	0–2	Southampton	Hove
			Moran 14'; Cockerill 40'	Stadium: Goldstone Ground; Attendance: 25,069

5 April 1986 Semi-Final	Southampton	0–2 (a.e.t.)	Liverpool	London
			Rush 100', 105'	Stadium: White Hart Lane; Attendance: 44,605

== League Cup ==
Entering the 1985–86 League Cup in the second round, Southampton faced Millwall of the Second Division. The first leg, at The Den, ended in a 0–0 draw thanks to a "stunning" performance by Saints goalkeeper Peter Shilton, who saved a second-half penalty to keep his clean sheet. The second leg also ended goalless, even after extra time, with the tie decided by a penalty shootout which was won 5–4 by the First Division side. In the third round, Southampton played Birmingham City at St Andrew's, holding the hosts to a 1–1 draw to force a replay at home. They won the replay 3–0, thanks to two goals from David Armstrong (one a free kick, the other a penalty) and one from Wallace; late on, Armstrong missed a second penalty for a chance to finish a hat-trick. Southampton's fourth round tie against Arsenal also ended in a draw necessitating a replay at home, which the visiting Gunners won 3–1 thanks to goals from Martin Hayes, Charlie Nicholas and Stewart Robson.

25 September 1985 Round 2 Leg 1	Millwall	0–0	Southampton	London
				Stadium: The Den; Attendance: 7,958

7 October 1985 Round 2 Leg 2	Southampton	0–0 (a.e.t.) (5–4 p)	Millwall	Southampton
				Stadium: The Dell; Attendance: 9,480

29 October 1985 Round 3	Birmingham City	1–1	Southampton	Birmingham
	Kennedy 25'		Puckett 13'	Stadium: St Andrew's; Attendance: 4,832

6 November 1985 Round 3 Replay	Southampton	3–0	Birmingham City	Southampton
	Armstrong 34', 39' (pen.); Wallace 60'			Stadium: The Dell; Attendance: 9,085

19 November 1985 Round 4	Arsenal	0–0	Southampton	London
				Stadium: Arsenal Stadium; Attendance: 18,244

26 November 1985 Round 4 Replay	Southampton	1–3	Arsenal	Southampton
	Armstrong 59' (pen.)		Hayes 56'; Nicholas 71'; Robson 75'	Stadium: The Dell; Attendance: 14,010

== Super Cup ==
With English sides banned from UEFA competitions following the Heysel Stadium disaster, teams that had qualified for either the 1985–86 European Cup, 1985–86 UEFA Cup or 1985–86 European Cup Winners' Cup were included in the inaugural (and only) Football League Super Cup. Due to their league position the previous season, Southampton had qualified for the UEFA Cup, and were consequently drawn in a Super Cup group with league runners-up Liverpool and third-placed team Tottenham Hotspur. The Saints lost both their opening away games 1–2, with Danny Wallace and Steve Moran, respectively, scoring consolations against Liverpool and Spurs. Southampton picked up a point in the home fixture against Liverpool, thanks to a 79th-minute David Armstrong penalty, before they lost again to Spurs 1–3 in December.

17 September 1985 Group Stage	Liverpool	2–1	Southampton	Liverpool
	Mølby 5'; Dalglish 29'		Wallace 23'	Stadium: Anfield; Attendance: 16,408

2 October 1985 Group Stage	Tottenham Hotspur	2–1	Southampton	London
	Falco 14', 38'		Moran 47'	Stadium: White Hart Lane; Attendance: 11,549

22 October 1985 Group Stage	Southampton	1–1	Liverpool	Southampton
	Armstrong 79' (pen.)		Walsh 81'	Stadium: The Dell; Attendance: 10,503

17 December 1985 Group Stage	Southampton	1–3	Tottenham Hotspur	Southampton
	Wallace 54'		Falco 9'; Allen 20'; Leworthy 84'	Stadium: The Dell; Attendance: 4,680

== Player details ==
Southampton used 27 different players during the 1985–86 season, 13 of whom scored during the campaign. Attacking midfielder David Armstrong featured in the most fixtures of any player, as well as finishing as the season's top goalscorer – he scored 16 goals in 57 appearances across all three competitions, missing only one game in the league. Peter Shilton finished with the second-most appearances of the season, playing in 52 of the 58 games, while Danny Wallace finished as the season's second-highest goalscorer, with 15 goals in all competitions.

=== Squad statistics ===
Name	Pos.	Nat.	League		FA Cup		League Cup		Super Cup		Total	
Name	Pos.	Nat.	Apps.	Gls.	Apps.	Gls.	Apps.	Gls.	Apps.	Gls.	Apps.	Gls.
David Armstrong	MF	(England)	41	10	6	2	6	3	4	1	57	16
Steve Baker	DF	(England)	13	0	5	0	6	0	2	0	26	0
Mark Blake	DF	(England)	1	0	0	0	0	0	0	0	1	0
Kevin Bond	DF	(England)	34	1	6	0	4	0	3	0	47	1
Kevan Brown	DF	(England)	0	0	0	0	0	0	0	0	0	0
Jimmy Case	MF	(England)	36	2	6	0	6	0	3	0	51	2
Glenn Cockerill	MF	(England)	30	7	6	2	0	0	2	0	38	9
Eamonn Collins	MF	(Republic of Ireland)	0	0	0	0	1	0	0	0	1	0
Alan Curtis	FW	(Wales)	10(1)	1	0	0	5	0	2	0	17(1)	1
Mark Dennis	DF	(England)	24	0	4	0	3	0	2	0	33	0
Gerry Forrest	DF	(England)	22	0	0	0	0	0	1	0	23	0
Jon Gittens	DF	(England)	4	0	0	0	0	0	0	0	4	0
Ivan Golac	DF	(Socialist Federal Republic of Yugoslavia)	9	0	0	0	0	0	1	0	10	0
Keith Granger	GK	(England)	2	0	0	0	0	0	0	0	2	0
Ian Hamilton	MF	(England)	0	0	0	0	0	0	0	0	0	0
Nick Holmes	MF	(England)	26	0	6	0	3	0	2	0	37	0
Joe Jordan	FW	(Scotland)	12	0	0	0	2	0	2	0	14	0
George Lawrence	MF	(England)	12(9)	2	3(1)	0	1	0	1(1)	0	17(11)	2
Craig Maskell	FW	(England)	0(2)	1	0	0	0	0	0	0	0(2)	1
Stuart McManus	FW	(Scotland)	2	1	0	0	0	0	0	0	2	1
Steve Moran	FW	(England)	24(4)	8	4	1	3(1)	0	3	1	34(5)	10
Phil Parkinson	MF	(England)	0	0	0	0	0	0	0	0	0	0
David Puckett	FW	(England)	13(2)	4	2	0	4(1)	1	1(1)	0	20(4)	5
Peter Shilton	GK	(England)	37	0	6	0	6	0	3	0	52	0
Allen Tankard	DF	(England)	3	0	0	0	0	0	0	0	3	0
Andy Townsend	MF	(Republic of Ireland)	25(2)	1	0(3)	0	3	0	2(2)	0	30(7)	1
Danny Wallace	FW	(England)	34(1)	8	6	4	5	1	3	2	48(1)	15
Mark Whitlock	DF	(England)	12(2)	0	0	0	2	0	2	0	16(2)	0
Mark Wright	DF	(England)	33	3	6	0	6	0	4	0	49	3
Players with appearances who ended the season out on loan
Phil Kite	GK	(England)	3	0	0	0	0	0	1	0	4	0

=== Most appearances ===
Rank	Name	Pos.	League		FA Cup		League Cup		Super Cup		Total		
Rank	Name	Pos.	Starts	Subs	Starts	Subs	Starts	Subs	Starts	Subs	Starts	Subs	Total
1	David Armstrong	MF	41	0	6	0	6	0	4	0	57	0	57
2	Peter Shilton	GK	37	0	6	0	6	0	3	0	52	0	52
3	Jimmy Case	MF	36	0	6	0	6	0	3	0	51	0	51
4	Mark Wright	DF	33	0	6	0	6	0	4	0	49	0	49
4	Danny Wallace	FW	34	1	6	0	5	0	3	0	48	1	49
6	Kevin Bond	DF	34	0	6	0	4	0	3	0	47	0	47
7	Steve Moran	FW	24	4	4	0	3	1	3	0	34	5	39
8	Glenn Cockerill	MF	30	0	6	0	0	0	2	0	38	0	38
9	Nick Holmes	MF	26	0	6	0	3	0	2	0	37	0	37
9	Andy Townsend	MF	25	2	0	3	3	0	2	2	30	7	37

=== Top goalscorers ===
Rank	Name	Pos.	League		FA Cup		League Cup		Super Cup		Total		
Rank	Name	Pos.	Goals	Apps	Goals	Apps	Goals	Apps	Goals	Apps	Goals	Apps	GPG
1	David Armstrong	MF	10	41	2	6	3	6	1	4	16	57	0.28
2	Danny Wallace	FW	8	35	4	6	1	5	2	3	15	49	0.31
3	Steve Moran	FW	8	28	1	4	0	4	1	3	10	39	0.26
4	Glenn Cockerill	MF	7	30	2	6	0	0	0	2	9	38	0.24
5	David Puckett	FW	4	15	0	2	1	5	0	2	5	24	0.21
6	Mark Wright	DF	3	33	0	6	0	6	0	4	3	49	0.06
7	George Lawrence	MF	2	21	0	4	0	1	0	2	2	28	0.07
7	Jimmy Case	MF	2	36	0	6	0	6	0	3	2	51	0.04
9	Craig Maskell	MF	1	2	0	0	0	0	0	0	1	2	0.50
9	Stuart McManus	FW	1	2	0	0	0	0	0	0	1	2	0.50
9	Alan Curtis	FW	1	11	0	0	0	5	0	2	1	18	0.06
9	Andy Townsend	MF	1	27	0	3	0	3	0	4	1	37	0.03
9	Kevin Bond	DF	1	34	0	6	0	4	0	3	1	47	0.02

== Bibliography ==
- Chalk, Gary; Holley, Duncan (10 August 1987), A Complete Record of Southampton Football Club: 1885–1987, Derby, England: Breedon Books, ISBN 978-0907969228
- Chalk, Gary; Holley, Duncan; Bull, David (28 November 2013), All the Saints: A Complete Who's Who of Southampton FC, Bristol, England: Hagiology Publishing, ISBN 978-0992686406
- Holley, Duncan; Chalk, Gary (2003), Bull, David (ed.), In That Number: A Post-War Chronicle of Southampton FC, Bristol, England: Hagiology Publishing, ISBN 0-9534474-3-X
- Juson, Dave; Aldworth, Clay; Bendel, Barry; Bull, David; Chalk, Gary (10 November 2004), Saints v Pompey: A History of Unrelenting Rivalry, Bristol, England: Hagiology Publishing, ISBN 978-0953447459
