= Redshaw =

Redshaw is a surname of Northern English origin. Notable people with the surname include:

- Barbara Redshaw, South African lawn and indoor bowler
- Jack Redshaw (born 1990), British footballer
- Leonard Redshaw (1911–1989), British shipbuilder
- Mark Redshaw (born 1984), British footballer
- Mike Redshaw, South African lawn and indoor bowler
- Ray Redshaw (born 1958), British footballer
