= Daniel Carter =

Daniel Carter or Dan Carter may refer to:

== Music ==
- Daniel Carter (LDS composer) (born 1955), American composer in The Church of Jesus Christ of Latter-day Saints
- Daniel Carter (musician) (born 1945), American jazz musician active in New York City
- Daniel P. Carter (born 1972), British rock guitarist and bassist and radio DJ

== Other ==
- Dan Carter (born 1982), New Zealand rugby union player
- Dan Carter (American politician) (born 1967), politician from Connecticut
- Dan Carter (Canadian politician), mayor of Oshawa, Ontario
- Dan T. Carter, American historian
- Daniel Carter (comics), one of three characters with the identity of Supernova in the DC Comics Universe
- Daniel Carter Beard (1850–1941), American illustrator and author
- Danny Carter (born 1969), English footballer
- Dan Carter, protagonist of the Dan Carter Cub Scout series by Mildred Wirt Benson

== See also ==
- Danielle Carter (disambiguation)
