= Victoria Stadium =

There are several Victoria Stadiums. These include:

- Victoria Stadium (Northwich), a football stadium in Wincham, Northwich, England
- Victoria Stadium (Gibraltar), a football stadium in Gibraltar
- Victoria-Stadion Hoheluft, a football stadium in Hamburg, Germany
- Docklands Stadium in Melbourne, Australia was given the working name Victoria Stadium during its construction
- Victoria Stadium (Melbourne), a stadium proposed for construction in the Melbourne Sports & Entertainment Precinct in 2016
