= Laurie Ryan (footballer, born 1963) =

English footballer

Personal information
- Full name: Laurence John Ryan
- Date of birth: 15 October 1963 (age 63)
- Place of birth: Watford, England
- Height: 5 ft 8 in (1.73 m)
- Position: Forward

Senior career*
Years	Team	Apps	(Gls)
1982–1984	St Albans City	63	(36)
1984–1985	Chesham United	47	(28)
1985–1988	Dunstable		
1988–1990	Cambridge United	51	(13)
1990	→ Colchester United (loan)	3	(0)
1990–1991	Colchester United	10	(3)
1991–1996	Cambridge City	126+5	(64)
- * Club domestic league appearances and goals

Laurence John "Laurie" Ryan (born 15 October 1963) is an English former professional footballer who played as a forward in the Football League for Cambridge United.

Ryan had non-League experience with St Albans City, Chesham United and Dunstable prior to joining Cambridge United in 1988. He scored 13 times in 51 league appearances, and had a loan spell with Conference side Colchester United in September 1990. He joined Colchester on a permanent basis following his release by Cambridge. At the end of the season, Ryan left Colchester to join Cambridge City, where he played until 1996.

== Career ==
Born in Watford, Ryan played for Isthmian League 1 outfit St Albans City between 1982 and 1984. He made a total of 77 appearances in all competitions for the club, scoring 36 goals, before spells with Chesham United and Dunstable.

Ryan joined Cambridge United from Dunstable in April 1988, and was top-scorer for the club in the 1988–89 season with 14 goals in all competitions.

Between his debut and December 1990, Ryan scored 13 goals in 51 league appearances, but towards the end of his spell, he was loaned out to Conference side Colchester United in September 1990. He made his Colchester debut on 19 September as a substitute in their 3–1 win at Boston United, making three substitute appearances before returning to Cambridge after his parent club commanded a £15,000 fee for a permanent transfer.

Released by Cambridge in December 1990, Ryan made a swift return to Colchester, going on to add 14 further appearances for the club during the second half of the 1990–91 season. He scored his first goal for the club on 12 March 1991 in a 2–2 draw with Runcorn. He scored two further goals in what would be his final game for Colchester on 4 May in a 2–0 win against Kidderminster Harriers at Layer Road.

Colchester decided not to retain Ryan for the 1991–92 season and he instead joined Cambridge City. A regular goalscorer for the Lilywhites, Ryan was forced to retire from playing in 1996 due to injury. In his five seasons at Milton Road Ryan scored 106 goals in all competitions in his 186 appearances.

After football, he went on to become a sales manager in the photocopier and office equipment sector.
