= Steve Wilkes =

English football manager (born 1967)

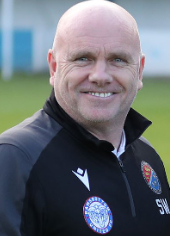
- Wilkes in 2024.

Personal information
- Full name: Stephen Brian Wilkes
- Date of birth: 30 June 1967 (age 59)
- Place of birth: Preston, Lancashire, England
- Position: Midfielder

Youth career
- Wigan Athletic

Senior career*
Years	Team	Apps	(Gls)
1987–1988	Preston North End	3	(0)
1988–1989	Southport	33	(9)
1989–1990	Morecambe	11	(1)
1992–1993	Bamber Bridge		

Managerial career
- 1998–2004: Darwen
- 2004–2007: Padiham
- 2008–2010: Runcorn Linnets
- 2017–2023: Northwich Victoria
- 2023–2026: Ramsbottom United
- * Club domestic league appearances and goals as of Ramsbottom United

Stephen Brian Wilkes (born 30 June 1967) is an English football manager & former professional footballer who played in the Football League as a midfielder. Wilkes was born in Preston, Lancashire. He was a part of the Wigan Athletic youth club. Wilkes has managed Ramsbottom United since 2023.

On 18 April 2023, Wilkes resigned as Northwich Victoria manager.

On 22 May 2023, Wilkes joined Ramsbottom United F.C. as Manager.
