= Danielle Carter =

Danielle Carter may refer to:

- Danielle Carter (actress), Australian actress
- Danielle Carter (footballer) (born 1993), English footballer
- Danielle Carter, a victim of the 1992 IRA bombing of the Baltic Exchange

== See also ==
- Daniel Carter (disambiguation)
