= Mark Rees =

English footballer

Personal information
- Full name: Mark Rees
- Date of birth: 13 October 1961 (age 65)
- Place of birth: Smethwick, England
- Height: 5 ft 10 in (1.78 m)
- Position: Winger

Youth career
- Walsall

Senior career*
Years	Team	Apps	(Gls)
1978–1990	Walsall	237	(37)
1986–1987	→ Rochdale (loan)	3	(0)
1990	Colchester United	1	(0)
1990–91	Shamrock Rovers	2	(0)
- Aldershot
- Dover Athletic
- Shrewsbury Town
- Solihull Borough
- Stafford Rangers
Total		243+	(37+)

International career
1977	England Schoolboys	9	(4)
- * Club domestic league appearances and goals

Mark Rees (born 13 October 1961) is an English former footballer who played in the Football League as a winger for Walsall and also had a short loan spell with Rochdale.

== Career ==
Born in Smethwick, Rees played for England at schoolboy level, signing professional terms with Walsall in August 1978. Between 1978 and 1990, Rees made over 230 Football League appearances for the Saddlers, scoring 37 times. During his time with the club, he aided them to promotion in 1987 via the Football League play-offs and also scored a winning goal against Arsenal at Highbury in the League Cup in 1984. Following two successive relegations with Walsall at the end of the 1980s, Rees was released. During his time with the club, Rees had a short loan spell with Rochdale during the 1986–87 season where he made three league appearances.

Following an operation on his hamstring, Rees joined recently relegated Colchester United in the Football Conference on a weekly contract on 3 September 1990. He made a few appearances for the reserve team, and only played in the first-team on one occasion, a 3–1 win at Layer Road against Cheltenham Town on 22 September, coming on for goalscorer Gary Bennett.

Rees left Colchester to play in Luxembourg briefly, before heading to the Republic of Ireland to play for Shamrock Rovers making his League of Ireland debut on 18 November at the RDS Arena. He only made one other league appearance before returning home. He also represented English non-league teams, including Aldershot, Dover Athletic, Shrewsbury Town, Solihull Borough and Stafford Rangers.
