= Drill Field =

Football stadium in Northwich, Cheshire

The Drill Field
- Interactive map of The Drill Field
- Full name: The Drill Field
- Location: Northwich, Cheshire, England
- Coordinates: 53°15′29.82″N 2°30′38.69″W
- Owner: Northwich Victoria F.C.
- Operator: Northwich Victoria
- Capacity: 6,000

Construction
- Opened: 1875
- Closed: 3 May 2002
- Demolished: 2002; redeveloped for housing

Tenant
- Northwich Victoria F.C. (1875-2002)

The Drill Field was a football stadium in Northwich, Cheshire, which was the home ground of Northwich Victoria Football Club between 1875 and 3 May 2002. At the time it was closed, it was believed to have been the oldest football ground in the world on which football had been continuously played.

== Early history ==
The Drill Hall Field, later simply the Drill Field, became the home of Northwich Victoria Football Club in 1875, who until that point had played at Stumper's Field, a short distance away next to the Hayhurst Bridge. The land for the Drill Field was, at first, used free of cost, and then leased from its original owners. The site was located on a field next to the Drill Hall in Leftwich, from which the ground took its name. The hall was built in 1867 and belonged to the 3rd Battalion, Cheshire Rifle Volunteers.

Originally a piece of fenced-off land, a grandstand was constructed in the 1890s housing 600 spectators. During that period, from 1892 to 1894, the ground hosted League football for the only time in its long history, as Northwich Victoria became founder members of the Football League Second Division.

In 1912 a covered stand was constructed, which would later be moved to face the grandstand and became known as the Dane Bank Stand, due to its location beside the banks of the River Dane.

In the early days of the Drill Field, there were no changing rooms or bathrooms, such facilities then were provided by local landlords.

In 1914, Northwich Victoria purchased the ground for £1,000 from Colonel Sir Thomas Marshall. 3 benefactors helped the club to pay this sum, they were Manchester City F.C., Sir John Brunner, a former President of the club and co-founder of Brunner Mond, a manufacturer of Soda Ash located in the town, and Greenall Whitley, a brewery based in the nearby town of Warrington. At the 1921 Annual General Meeting held on 10 August, it was announced that the remaining interest for the purchase of the ground had been paid and that the ground was now owned by the club.

== Final decade ==
In the summer of 1996, a plan to rebuild the Dane Bank Stand was announced in order to help the ground to meet Conference standards. The Sports Ground Initiative, a charity which provided money to Conference clubs to improve their grounds, donated £250,000 to the new stand, more than half of the total £450,000 cost of the stand. The stand was officially opened by former Everton F.C. manager Joe Royle on 27 January 1998. Following the opening of the stand, Manchester United fielded a side to face Northwich including Henning Berg and Brian McClair.

Less than a month later on 12 February, the Drill Field hosted an England Under 16s match against Israel, featuring future Premier League players such as Wes Brown, Paul Robinson, Paul Konchesky and Yossi Benayoun.

On 1 July 1999, the England Under 16s returned to the Drill Field for a match against France with future Premier League players such as Jermaine Pennant, Michael Chopra and Jérémie Aliadière making appearances.

== Demolition ==
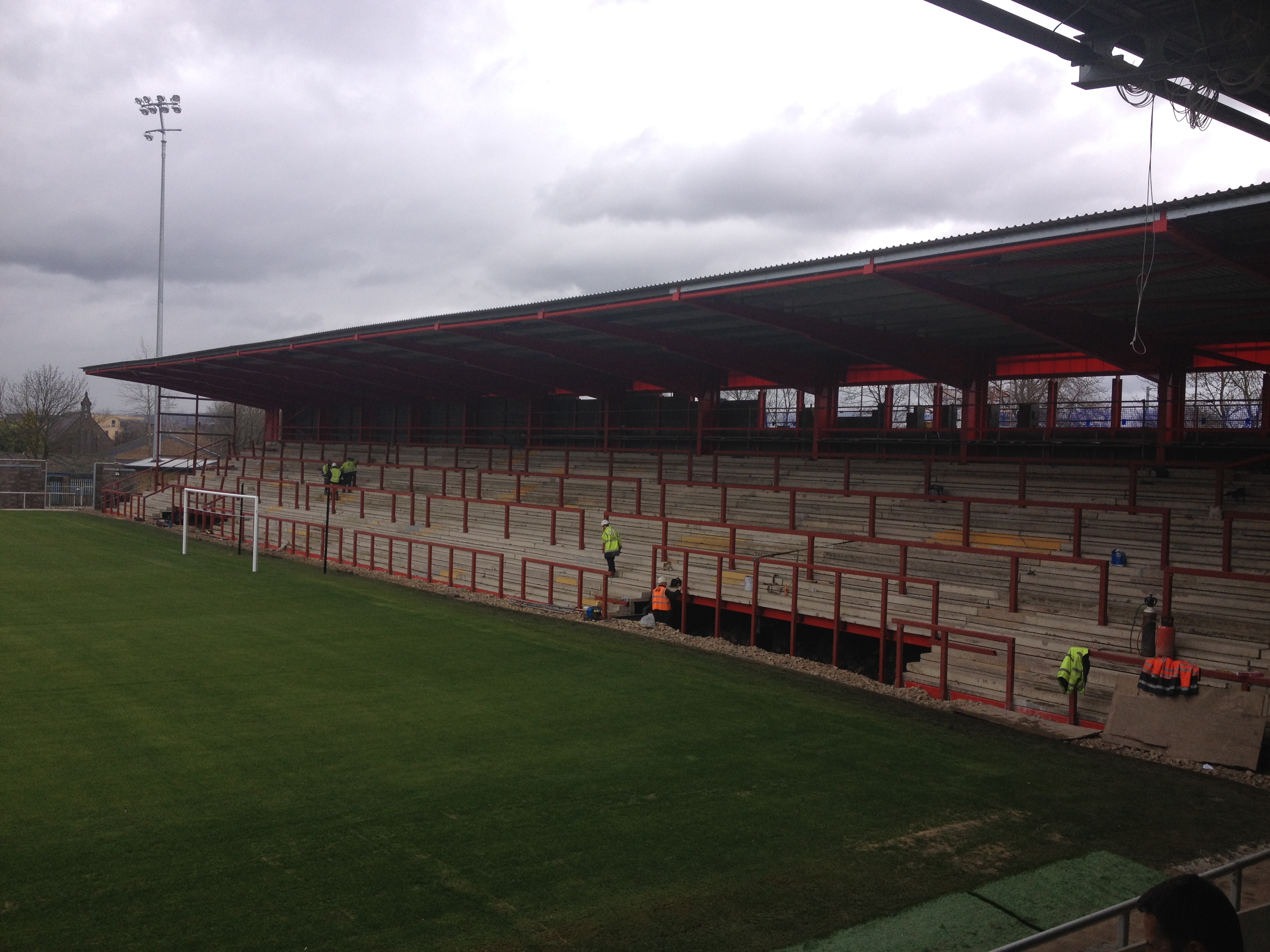
The steel and concrete from the Dane Bank Stand was recovered and used to build the St. Mary's Road End at Broadhurst Park.

The final game played at the Drill Field was a Mid Cheshire Senior Cup match against Congleton Town on 3 May 2002. Following this, the ground was sold to property developers and demolished, with the club moving into their new home a few years later at the Victoria Stadium. The entire Dane Bank Stand, rebuilt in 1998, was dismantled and re-erected at the Victoria Stadium. Following the closure of that stadium, the stand was dismantled for a second time, where the steelwork was recycled for installation at Broadhurst Park, the new ground of the non-league club F.C. United of Manchester. The road where the Drill Field was located retains its old name, despite now being used for houses as Drill Field Road.

== Colwyn Bay FC ==
Colwyn Bay Football Club played their home games at the Drill Field in the Northern Premier League Premier Division during the 1992–93 season. Colwyn Bay were forced to leave Wales after refusing to join the newly formed League of Wales and played for a season in Northwich before moving to Ellesmere Port before they were eventually allowed back to play in the English system at their Llanelian Road home following a successful High Court ruling in London in April 1995.
