= Gary Osbourne =

English footballer

Personal information
- Full name: Calbert Gary James Osbourne
- Date of birth: 22 October 1969 (age 57)
- Place of birth: Wolverhampton, England
- Height: 5 ft 7 in (1.70 m)
- Positions: Right winger; full-back

Youth career
- Shrewsbury Town

Senior career*
Years	Team	Apps	(Gls)
1988–1989	Shrewsbury Town	7	(0)
- Telford United
- Stourbridge
1991	Colchester United	6	(0)
- Cradley Town
- Bilston Town
- Redditch United
- Sutton Coldfield Town
- Tamworth
- Stourbridge

International career
1985	England U16	7	(3)
- * Club domestic league appearances and goals

Calbert Gary James Osbourne (born 22 October 1969) is an English former professional footballer who played as a right winger or full-back in the Football League for Shrewsbury Town.

== Career ==
Born in Wolverhampton, Osbourne signed for Shrewsbury Town on youth terms in the summer of 1988. He made three starts and four substitute appearances between 1988 and 1989 before he was released. He joined Telford United and then Stourbridge before signing for recently relegated Conference side Colchester United.

Colchester manager Ian Atkins brought Osbourne to the club in March 1991 to bolster the squad ahead of the final months of the season. Colchester were battling Barnet and Kettering Town for the Conference title, and after some promising displays for the Colchester reserve team, he was given his debut in April. He was brought on as a substitute to replace Nicky Smith during the U's 2–1 win at Gateshead on 1 April. He made five further starts for the club, but was released at the end of the season.

Osbourne returned to non-League football in the West Midlands, turning out for Cradley Town, Bilston Town, Redditch United, Sutton Coldfield Town, Tamworth, and a second stint at Stourbridge.
