= Northwich Victoria F.C. =

Association football club in Wincham, England

Northwich Victoria
- Full name: Northwich Victoria Football Club
- Nicknames: The Vics; The Trickies
- Founded: 1874; 152 years ago (amalgamated in 1890 with Hartford and Davenham United)
- Ground: APEC Taxis Stadium (groundshare with Runcorn Linnets)
- Chairman: Ian Egerton
- Manager: Lee Duckworth
- League: Midland League Premier Division
- 2025–26: Midland League Premier Division, 2nd of 18
- Website: northwichvictoriafc.com
Home colours	Away colours

Northwich Victoria Football Club are a semi-professional football club based in Runcorn, Cheshire, which compete in the Midland League Premier Division. They play home games at APEC Taxis Stadium, in a groundshare agreement with Runcorn Linnets. They had played at the same Drill Field ground between 1875 and 2002, which was at the time of its demolition believed to be the oldest ground in the world on which football had been continuously played. They played at the short-lived Victoria Stadium between 2005 and 2011, and have since been forced to share grounds with nearby clubs.

The original club was founded in 1874, and named in honour of the then-reigning monarch, Queen Victoria. They won the first six Cheshire Senior Cup finals in the competition's history. The club became defunct and amalgamated with Hartford and Davenham United in February 1890, with the new club taking the old Northwich Victoria name. This new club helped to found The Combination in 1890, before being invited to become founding members of the Football League Second Division two years later. After two seasons playing in the Football League, they returned to The Combination and spent 1898 to 1899 in the Cheshire League. Northwich spent 1900 to 1912 competing in the Manchester League, being crowned champions in the 1902–03 campaign. They spent a short time either side of World War I in the Lancashire Combination.

Northwich Victoria became founder members of the Cheshire County League in 1919 and would win the competition for the first and only time in the 1956–57 season. They co-founded the Northern Premier League in 1968 and then the Alliance Premier League in 1979. Northwich won the FA Trophy in 1984, having been runners-up in 1983 and then again in 1996. Relegated in 2005, they won the Conference North title at the end of the 2005–06 campaign, However, the club suffered three relegations in four years by 2012, and were relegated down to the ninth tier of English football in 2017. In June 2017, the club was taken over by its supporters.

== History ==
=== Early history and amalgamation ===
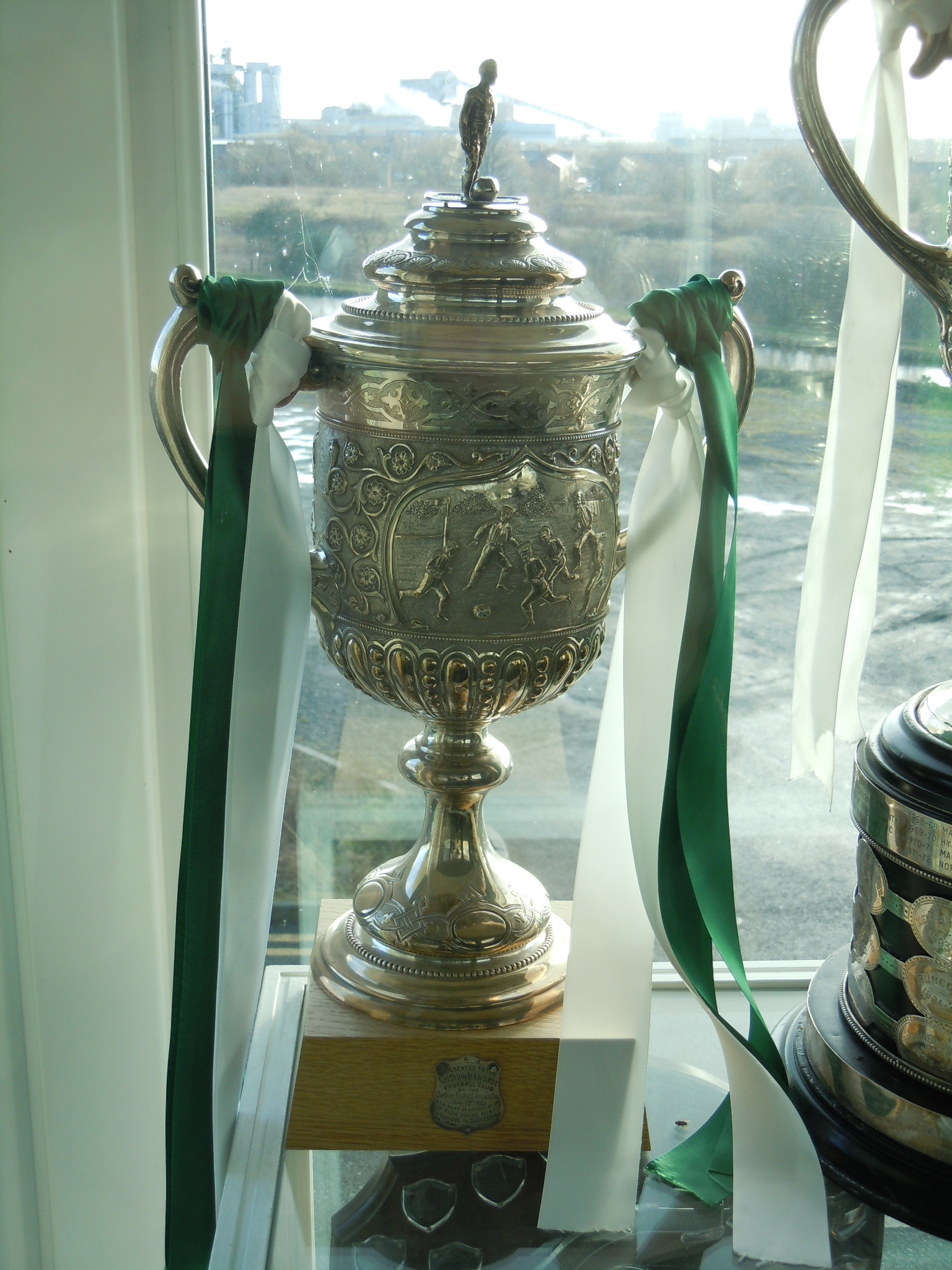
The original Cheshire Football Association Challenge Cup, which was presented to Northwich Victoria in 1885 following their success in the competition for 6 consecutive seasons.

The generally accepted year for the original Northwich Victoria Football Club's founding is 1874 by Charles James Hughes and James Heyworth. However, according to club historian Ken Edwards' book A Team for All Seasons, the organisation itself could have been in existence earlier in the 1870s. Northwich played their first challenge matches in the 1874 season and originally accepted both association football and rugby rules. This was shown in 1876 when they contested an away match under Rugby rules at Farnworth and Appleton F.C. (now known as Widnes Vikings) and then at home under association rules, winning both games. The first time the club entered an organised competition was the 1877 Welsh Cup, which at the time was open to Welsh teams as well as English teams situated close to the border. Its best achievement in the competition was in the 1881–82 and 1888–89 seasons, when the club reached the final, losing to Druids and Bangor respectively. When they reached the final in 1882, they were the first English club to do so. In 1880, the club entered the inaugural competition for the new Cheshire Football Association Challenge Cup (Cheshire Senior Cup) and became the first winners of the cup with a victory over Hartford St. John's. They went on to win the cup for the next five seasons, defeating in the finals: Birkenhead (1881), Northwich Novelty (1882), Crewe Alexandra (1883 and 1884), and Davenham (1885).

In 1890, the club became a founding member of the second incarnation of The Combination, Northwich's first league. In their second season in the league they finished as runners-up. On Monday 17 February 1890, the original club would cease to exist by the end of that season after a vote was passed at the Crown and Anchor Hotel, Northwich, to amalgamate with nearby Hartford and Davenham United; that club had also been formed by the amalgamation of Hartford St. John's (founded in 1876) and Davenham (founded in 1879). It was agreed at the meeting that the new club would use the name Northwich Victoria, however the original club was declared defunct, and the Cheshire Challenge Cup which had been given to the club, was now given to the Brunner Public Library in the town.

=== Professionalism and the Football League ===
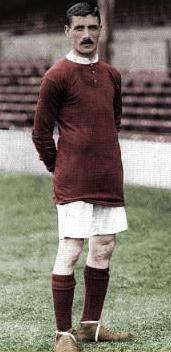
Billy Meredith, shown above in Manchester United colours, played for Northwich during their early Football League years.

A great leap forward was taken in 1892, when Northwich became one of the founding members of the English Second Division, which saw the team turn professional. In the league's inaugural season, Northwich finished 7th, the highest finish in the club's history. It was during the latter stages of this season that Northwich acquired the services of Billy Meredith, the Welsh International, who is widely regarded as the first football superstar. At Northwich, he teamed up with Pat Finnerhan, a regular for the Northwich team for the past few seasons, and a player whom Meredith would spend more time with when both joined Manchester City in 1894. It was said by many that "Finnerhan made Meredith". Northwich would remain a professional team for one further season, 1893–94, during which they defeated Newcastle United 5–3 at the Drill Field, a game where Meredith scored his first hat-trick for the club. Another notable result was holding Woolwich Arsenal (now known as Arsenal F.C.) to a 2–2 draw at the Drill Field. However, as a result of their final position at the bottom of the league, the club's board decided not to apply for re-election to the Football League at the end of the season. The financial burden of professional football had taken its toll on the club, which decided to return to strictly amateur, regional football in their first and previous league, The Combination, where they had a mixture of mid-table and top-half finishes up to the 1898 season, when they left the league.

In 1898, Northwich became a member of the newly formed Cheshire League, where they remained for two seasons, finishing 8th in their first season, and runners-up in their next season in the First Division.

Up to the middle of this century, Northwich played in red and blue horizontal stripes. However a major change in the club's livery occurred when they adopted the colours they still wear today; green and white.

Lured by the chance of increased revenues, the club joined the Manchester League in the 1900–01 season, when they finished runners-up. Silverware came only two seasons later in the 1902–03 season when they won the league, finishing 9 points clear of their nearest challengers Newton Heath Athletic.

They departed the Manchester League in the 1912–13 season, becoming members of the second division of the Lancashire Combination (not to be confused with The Combination). Their first season saw them promoted to the First Division after finishing 4th.

In 1919, the club became a founding member of the Cheshire County League, which was more appropriate for its location in the county of Cheshire. Making hard work of achieving success, Northwich won the league only once in the 1956–57 season. They continued to play in the league until the 1967–68 season.

=== Post-war ===
In 1968, Northwich were one of several members from the Cheshire County League to leave and become a founder member of the newly created Northern Premier League. Generally finishing around mid-table or in the top half, it was the 1976–77 season when Northwich came closest to winning the league, narrowly missing out on the title on goal difference to Boston United on the final day of the season following a 1–1 draw with Scarborough. In the same season Northwich had their best run in the FA Cup in modern times, reaching the fourth round (see FA Cup History).

In 1979, Northwich were founder members of yet another league, when the Alliance Premier League (later the Football Conference) was formed. In 1980–81, Northwich finished 4th, their highest position in the league. They were the last ever-present team when they were relegated in the 2004–05 season.

The club reached the final of the FA Trophy in the 1982–83 season, but were beaten 2–1 by Telford United. However the club achieved silverware in the 1983–84 season when they defeated Bangor City 2–1 in the same competition, the FA Trophy in a replay of the final at the appropriately named Victoria Ground in Stoke-on-Trent. The first game, played at Wembley Stadium, was drawn 1–1.

On 10 December 1986, Northwich were due to play Maidstone, who were on that day the leaders of the GM Vauxhall Conference. Northwich had been badly hit by injuries and flu, and were unable to field a full team; they had tried but failed to get the match postponed. Manager Stuart Pearson planned to start the game with the only eight fit players at his disposal. On hearing of this, club chairman Derek Nuttall walked into the social club an hour before kick-off and asked if anyone would like a game. After the initial surprise, three supporters (one of whom had already fortified himself with two pints and a pork pie) volunteered. Registration formalities were completed just in time, and the match (later to be dubbed "The Pie and Pints Match") went ahead. The three new players were given the instruction, "When you get the ball, give it to (former England international) Gordon Hill" - which they did. Northwich 1-1 Maidstone.

In the 1995–96 season, they reached the final of the FA Trophy once again, returning to Wembley for the first time since their draw and eventual victory in the competition a decade earlier. They were defeated 3–1 by Macclesfield Town.

=== 2000s and the end of the Drill Field ===
The new century saw Northwich Victoria face great financial difficulties and relegation, with the club nearly folding following administration in both the 2004–05 and 2009–10 seasons.

In the 2003–04 season, Northwich were slated for relegation to the Conference North division as part of the National League System restructuring; however, the bankruptcy of Telford United, Watnall Road, the ground of Hucknall Town not being good enough and the demotion of Margate all led to Northwich Victoria being allowed to remain at the Conference National level.

In September of the 2004–05 season, the club went into administration, and thus were deducted 10 points under National League rules, which left them in relegation trouble. However, the team recovered and finished in 19th place, nine points clear of the relegation zone. They were voluntarily demoted from the Conference National anyway due to legal problems. After going into administration, FA deadlines over the transfer of their Conference membership to the club's new owners were not met. The alternative to demotion would have been outright expulsion from the Conference, which would have forced the club to start again in one of the lower regional divisions).

The 2005–06 season appeared to be a turn in the right direction for Northwich as they reached the third round of the FA Cup, and in the penultimate game of the season, beat their nearest rivals, Stafford Rangers, in front of more than 3,000 supporters to guarantee an immediate return to the Conference National and see them as champions of the Conference North.

In October 2007 it was reported that the club was up for sale, and the club's existence was again threatened due to an unpaid tax bill. The club had applied to go into administration to stave off closure. In December 2007, a consortium led by Jim Rushe completed a takeover, with Rushe becoming the club's chairman. However, Victoria Stadium remained owned by former chairman Mike Connett's real estate company Beaconet Ltd., which was in receivership. In January 2009, Connett removed safety equipment from the stadium, causing the club to move temporarily to Altrincham's Moss Lane ground.

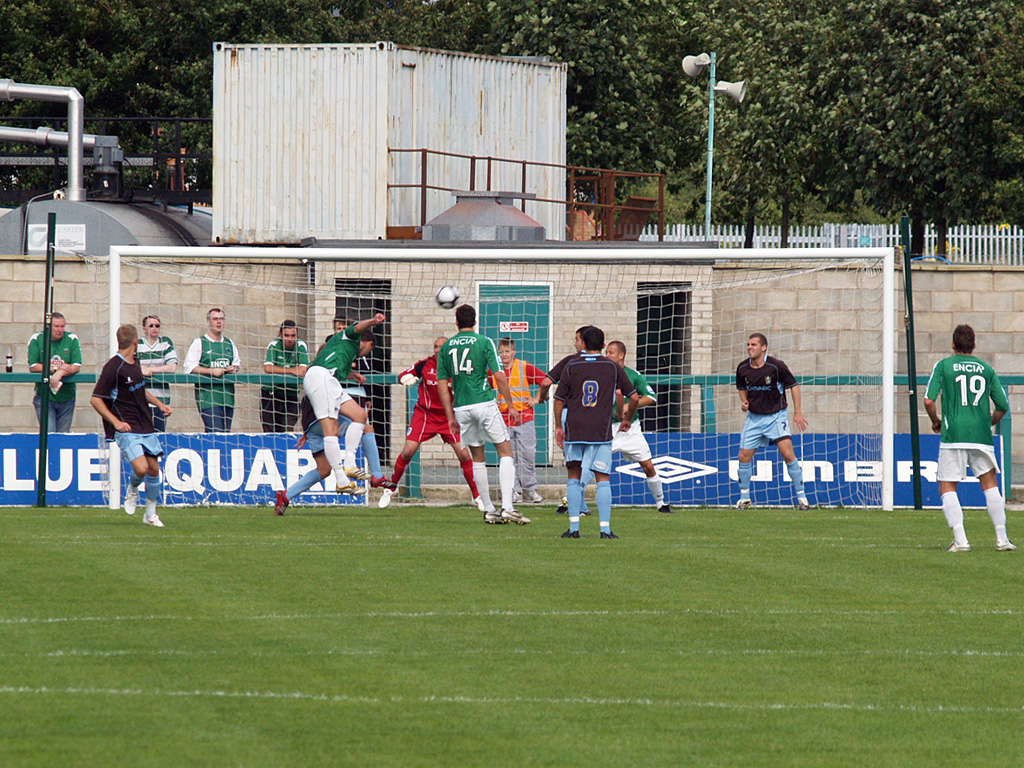
Northwich play in a friendly against Bury in 2008

On 19 May 2009 the club went into administration for the second time in five years following their relegation from the Conference National; they owed around £500,000 in unpaid bills to creditors. They were threatened with a double relegation to the Northern Premier League as a result of this, but ultimately won an appeal to be placed into the Conference North for the 2009–10 season.

The 2009–10 season saw Northwich achieve a mid-table finish, but due to the ongoing financial problems, the club were expelled from the league and placed in the Northern Premier League Premier Division. For months following their FA Cup campaign in 2009, the club was still owed at least £180,000 of its FA Cup and TV broadcasting money by the FA, which would have allowed the club to settle their remaining debts. The club received the money in December 2010, a welcome relief due to adverse weather conditions which had affected football fixtures during the Winter.

During the season, Northwich won the Cheshire Senior Cup for the first time in 15 years, beating Woodley Sports on penalties. This was their first piece of silverware since they won the Conference North in 2006. They remained unbeaten in the competition under the management of Andy Preece until the end of 2011 following their defeat to Stalybridge Celtic. The team won the cup twice under Preece's management.

Following the end of the 2009–10 season, most of the squad were placed on the transfer market in an effort to cut wage bills. By the start of the new season, only three players from the previous season remained in the squad. The reserve feeder team, Woodley F.C, became Northwich Villa, who played in Division One of the Cheshire Football League. Many of the squad for that season came through the new structure into the first team's squad.

=== 2010s, management split and ground crisis ===
In January 2012 the club were informed that they were to be evicted from the Victoria Stadium by their neighbours THOR Chemicals who had purchased the land, despite assurances that the club's purchase of the ground was almost complete. At the same time the management team of Andy Preece, Andy Morrison, and Darren Ryan left the club to join Airbus UK Broughton. They were replaced by Paul Simpson, but he departed after only a month, and Martin Foyle took over until the end of the season.

In April 2012 the Northern Premier League announced that Northwich Victoria had been expelled from the league for a breach of league rules regarding financial matters. Although lying second in the league, the club was not allowed to contest the playoffs. On appeal, the FA ruled that the punishment was excessive; instead the club was relegated one step in the league.

Former Wolverhampton Wanderers striker Andy Mutch took over as manager for the 2012–13 season. Northwich started the season in the lowest league in the club's history, with their local rivals Witton Albion starting in a higher division for the first time. With no home ground, and a large section of the fan-base refusing to associate with the club or its then-owner, Northwich Victoria achieved its lowest ever home game attendance, with only 86 spectators witnessing a 3–4 defeat to Stamford A.F.C. Mutch departed from the club on 3 November of that year, with the club mired in controversy but eighth in the league table. Lee Ashcroft was appointed the new manager in December 2012.

A breakaway club, 1874 Northwich F.C., was founded by the Northwich Victoria Supporters Trust on 15 November 2012, following a vote by its membership to break away from Northwich Victoria and form a new, community-owned team, initially playing in Winsford.

Northwich moved from the Northern Premier League Division One South to Division One North in 2013–14. During December, a 10-match stadium ban that had been given to Ashcroft was upheld on appeal, and so he was replaced as manager by Jim Gannon. In 2014–15, Northwich finished fourth and qualified for the promotion playoffs but was defeated in extra time. However, for 2015–16, Witton Albion were relegated to the same division, and Northwich was able to re-establish a three-year ground-sharing arrangement with them permitting Northwich to play at Wincham Park. In the 2015–16 FA Cup, Northwich advanced through six rounds of competition to become the last team from Level 8 still competing, and Northwich finished third in Division One North despite a 9-point penalty for using an ineligible player in four matches, reaching the finals in the playoffs for promotion. For the 2016–17 season, both Northwich and Witton Albion were transferred to Division One South. In January 2016, Gannon departed, being replaced by Adam Lakeland.

Paul Moore took over as manager after the resignation of Lakeland during the mid season 2016–17 . With off-field developments overshadowing the hard work of players and management, the new-look team struggled at the lower end of the table for much of the season and certainly Lakeland had his work cut out from the start. Despite some and potential lifelines at the end of the season, the announcement came that the club was to enter administration yet again (along with the inevitable 10-point deduction) and relegation to Step 5 was confirmed. Paul Moore was replaced as manager by Steve Wilkes in September 2017.

=== Cup history ===
During their long history, Northwich Victoria have had many FA Cup runs where they have qualified for the first round proper and further. Their first, and best run, came in the 1883–84 season, when the side reached the quarterfinals, defeating Druids, Davenham and Brentwood in the earlier rounds. However, they were beaten ultimately by Blackburn Olympic in the quarterfinals.

On 19 November 1892, Northwich defeated Liverpool 2–1 in the Third Qualifying Round in Liverpool's first season and therefore became the first team to eliminate Liverpool from the FA Cup.

In modern times, Northwich Victoria's best performance in the FA Cup came in the 1976–77 season, reaching the fourth round. After beating Rochdale in the first round (forcing them to two replays), they defeated Peterborough United on the second round and Elton John's Watford 3–2 at the Drill Field in the third round. A home tie against Oldham Athletic for the Fourth round was moved to Maine Road due to popular interest. Northwich lost the game 3–1 in front of a crowd of more than 29,000, their largest crowd ever.

In the 2005–06 season, under the management of Steve Burr, Northwich reached the FA Cup third round, and were drawn against Premier League side Sunderland on 8 January 2006. Over 3,000 supporters travelled to the Stadium of Light, where Northwich were ultimately defeated 3–0.

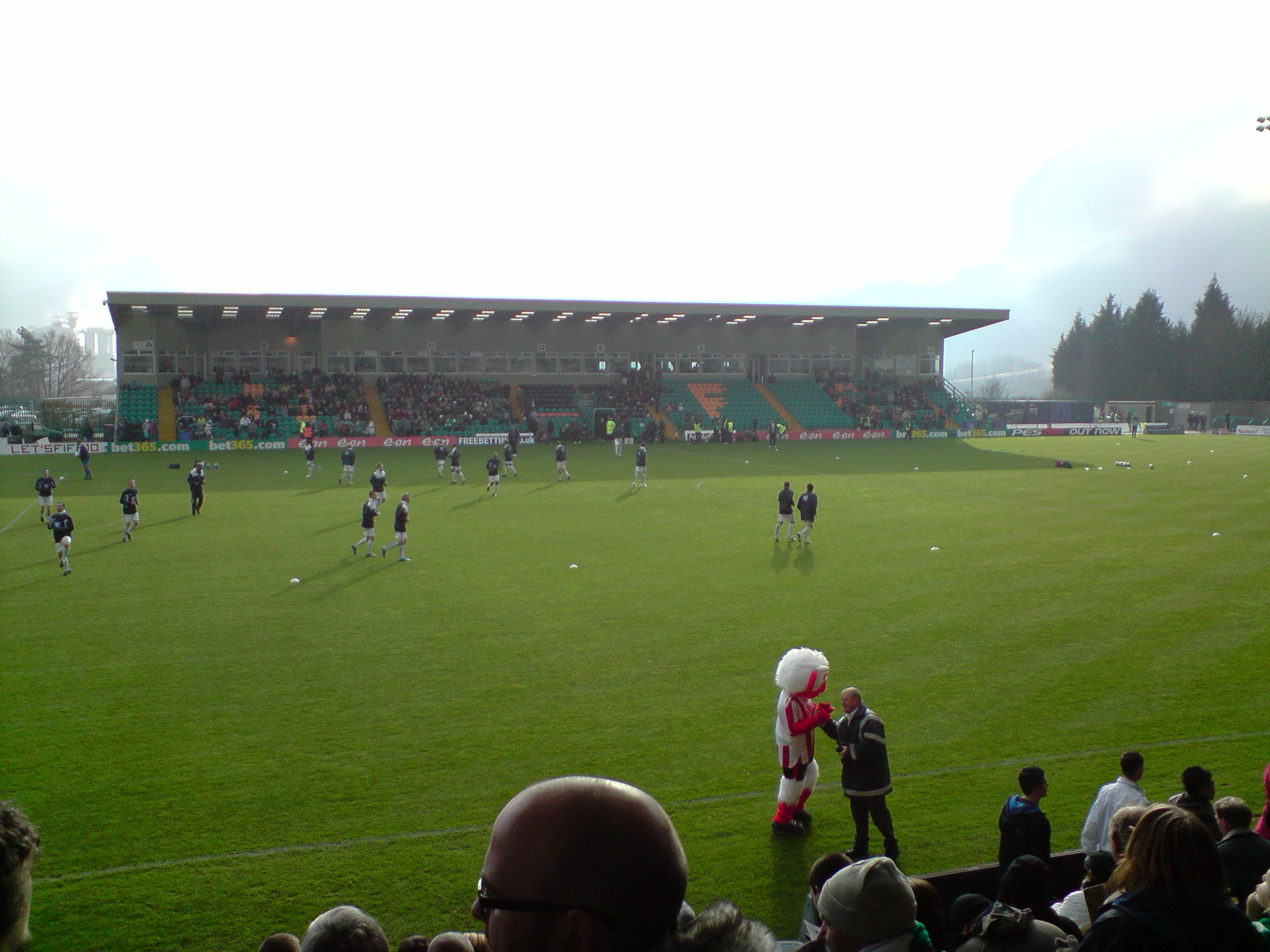
Northwich players warming up for the second round FA Cup game against Lincoln City at the Victoria Stadium.

The club have reached the second round on several occasions: in 1979–80 (losing to Wigan Athletic in a replay), 1982–83 (Scunthorpe United), 1984–85 (Wigan Athletic), 1987–88 (Blackpool), 1988–89 (Tranmere Rovers), 2000-01 (Leyton Orient), and 2009-10 (Lincoln City). Despite their league position declining to Level 8, which required five qualifying rounds just to reach the first round proper, Northwich Victoria again reached the second round in 2015–16, and were defeated by Northampton Town from Football League Two in December 2015.

== Club identity ==
Northwich Victoria are known to their fans by several nicknames. The most common, Vics/The Vics, is a shortening of Victoria in the club's name. They are also known as 'The Trickies', a nickname initially given to them as an insult by local rivals, a nickname that has been adopted by the club's own fans. In old media, the club were also referred to as the Victorians (again owing to their name), and the 'Salt Boys/Men', due to Northwich's history as being a centre of the UK salt trade.

== Grounds ==
From their foundation in 1874, Northwich played at the Drill Field, located in the centre of Northwich. Due to the ground not meeting new safety regulations and standards, and to provide revenue for the club, the ground was demolished in 2002.

In the three-year gap between the demolition of the Drill Field and the construction of Victoria Stadium, Northwich played at Wincham Park, the home of their Northwich rivals Witton Albion, which is located across the canal from the Victoria Stadium.

A new ground was built in Wincham, a few miles outside of the town in the middle of a business park. It was named the Victoria Stadium, and was opened in 2005, with its official opening in 2006 by Sir Alex Ferguson. When the team was sold to Jim Rushe in 2007, ownership of Victoria Stadium remained with former owner Mike Connett, although Rushe always claimed that his purchase of the stadium was imminent.

In January 2012, Rushe's planned purchase of the Victoria Stadium fell through, and the site was sold to chemical manufacturer Thor Specialities Ltd., who were based adjacent to the stadium and planned on expanding their operation. As a result, the club was evicted from the ground with immediate effect, with its remaining home fixtures of the 2011–12 season either played at nearby venues or switched to the ground of the away team. Victoria Stadium was then torn down.

The club then tentatively agreed to share Marston Road, the home of Stafford Rangers located over 40 miles south of Northwich, to enable them to gain readmission to the Northern Premier League for the following season. The club hoped to secure a groundshare closer to their home town before the season started, and eventually agreed a lease on Flixton's Valley Road. However, the ground at Flixton did not meet ground grading requirements for the Northern Premier League. The club then unsuccessfully appealed the leagues refusal to allow the sub-standard ground at Flixton and followed this up with a second unsuccessful appeal as to their placement in the Southern division of the Northern Premier League. The club were forced to remain at Stafford, and were subsequently denied the appeal to switch to the Northern division due to the extra travelling for the away clubs.

In 2013–14, Northwich Victoria were permitted to transfer to the Northern division and to play at Flixton's Valley Road. Finally, in 2015–16, Northwich returned to playing at Wincham Park as part of a renewed ground-share with Witton Albion. On 7 March 2016, it was announced by Witton Albion that they would terminate the groundshare agreement at the end of the 2015/16 season.

Northwich Victoria entered a groundshare agreement with Barnton FC to play at their Townfield lane ground for the 2017–18 season, before returning to Witton Albion's Wincham Park ground from the start of the 2018–19 season. As of December 2023, Northwich Victoria Ground share with Winsford United at Barnton Stadium.

== Rivalries ==
Vics have a fierce rivalry with Witton Albion, another Northwich team who play less than 500 yards from the former Victoria Stadium site.But more recently have had a fierce rivalry with Winsford United,Where many incidents have happened in the last decade including former manager Steve Wilkes being "abused" by winsford fans, and more recently in march 2026 many youths from Winsford tried to engage in violence with northwich fans, as well as lighting flares and throwing bottles and cans at them,this resulted in winsford banning under 16s without a parent

They also have a rivalry with both Altrincham and 1874 Northwich.

== Records and statistics ==
- Record victory – 17–0 v. Marple Ass. (Cheshire Senior Cup) (7 February 1931)
- Heaviest defeat – 10–0 v. Congleton Town (3 April 2024)
- Highest attendance – 11,290 v. Witton Albion (Good Friday 1949)
- Highest attendance (at any ground) — 28,635 v. Oldham Athletic FA Cup fourth round – Maine Road – (Saturday 1.1.77; Northwich 1–3 Oldham)
- Most appearances – 961, Ken Jones (1969–85)
- Most goals scored (overall) — 160, Peter Burns (1955-1966)
- Most goals scored (season) — 60 in 47 games, Len Barber (1956-57)
- Record transfer fee paid — £10,000 to Hyde United for Malcolm O'Connor (August 1988) and £10,000 to Kidderminster Harriers for Delwyn Humphreys (September 1995)
- Record transfer fee received — £50,000 from Chester City for Neil Morton (October 1990) and £50,000 from Leyton Orient for Gary Taylor-Fletcher (June 2001)
- Highest League finish – 7th – Division 2 (1892–93)
- Best FA Cup run – Quarter-finals (1883–84)
- Best FA Trophy run – Champions (1983–84)
- Best FA Vase run - Semi-finals (2018–19)

=== Founder members ===
Northwich Victoria are a founder member of several leagues, and inaugural members of cup competitions. These are:

- Cheshire Football Association – 1878
- Cheshire County Football Association Challenge Cup (Cheshire Senior Cup) – inaugural member and first winner – 1879
- The Combination (second incarnation) – 1890
- Football League Second Division (Football League Championship) – 1892
- Cheshire County League – 1919
- Northern Premier League – 1968
- FA Trophy – inaugural member – 1969
- Alliance Premier League (Football Conference) – 1979
- Conference League Cup – inaugural member and first winner – 1979

== Players ==
=== Notable former players ===
Inclusion criteria: Attained international caps, went on to/previously played at a significantly higher level of football or is notable for a specific reason.

- (Nigeria) Dele Adebola
- (England) Gareth Ainsworth
- (England) Jonny Allan
- (England) George Roe
- (England) David Bardsley
- (England) Peter Barnes
- (Germany) Felix Bastians
- (Jamaica) Trevor Benjamin
- (England) Warren Bradley
- (England) Henry Thomas Bradshaw
- (England) Paul Brayson
- (England) Junior Brown
- (England) Joel Byrom
- (England) Michael Carr
- (England) Kieran Charnock
- (England) Ronnie Cope
- (England) Matthew Earlam
- (England) John Farmer
- (England) Pat Finnerhan
- (Zimbabwe) Bruce Grobbelaar
- (England) Brian Hall
- (England) Gordon Hill
- (England) Charles James Hughes
- (Wales) Frederick William Hughes
- (England) George Alfred Hughes
- (England) Alan Kennedy
- (Northern Ireland) Jon McCarthy
- (Northern Ireland) Sammy McIlroy
- (Wales) Billy Meredith
- (England) Adie Mike
- (Cape Verde) Pedro 'Pelé' Monteiro
- (England) Alan Oakes
- (England) Stuart Pearson
- (England) Andy Preece
- (England) Ray Redshaw
- (Northern Ireland) Jimmy Quinn
- (England) Mark Roberts
- (England) Neil Sorvel
- (England) Gary Taylor-Fletcher
- (England) Shaun Teale
- (England) Scott Wagstaff
- (England) Mark Ward
- (England) Paul Warhurst
- (England) Colin West
- (England) Max Woosnam
- (England) Rashid Yussuff
- (Italy) Alessandro Zarrelli

== Club management ==
=== Coaching positions ===
- Owner: Fan Owned
- Chairman: Ian Egerton
- Vice-chairman: Chris Cragg
- Football Secretary: Brian Turner
- Manager: Lee Duckworth
- Assistant Manager: N/A
- First Team Coach: N/A
- Treasurer: James Frith

=== Managerial history ===
Dates	Name	Notes
1933–34	(Scotland) Bob Ferguson	
1935–47	(England) Billy Wootton	
1947–48	(England) Harry Ware	First term as manager.
1948–49	(Scotland) Sandy McNab	
1949–51	(England) Harry Ware	Second term as manager.
1951	(England) Billy Russell	
1951–52	(England) Thomas Ashley	Temporary charge as club Vice-president
1952–53	(England) Harry Ware	Third term as manager.
1953–54	(England) Arthur Woodruff	
1954	(England) Tom Manley	
1955–57	(England) Jack Boothway	
1957	(England) Ron Carey	
1958–62	(England) Jack Bonell	
1963–64	(England) Roy Clarke	
1964–65	(England) Bill Heardley	
1965	(England) Norman Kirkman	
1965–66	(England) Ronnie Cope	
1966–68	(Scotland) Felix Reilly	
1968	(England) Arthur Cumberlidge	
1968–69	(England) Noel Kelly	
1969	(England) Don Moore	
1969–71	(England) Jack Bonell	
1971–72	(England) John Green	
1972–73	(England) Terry Bradbury	
1973	(Scotland) Jackie Mudie	
1973–74	(England) Brian Taylor	
1974–75	(England) Tommy Spratt	
1975–77	(England) Paul Ogden	First term as manager.
1977	(England) Bob Murphy	
1977–78	(England) George Heslop	
1978–80	(England) Ray Williams	
1980	(England) Paul Ogden	Second term as manager.
1980–81	(England) Stan Storton	
1981	(Scotland) Ian McNeill	
1981	(Scotland) Lammie Robertson	
1981–84	(England) John King	
1984–85	(England) Terry Murphy	
1985–86	(England) Mike Pejic	
1986	(England) Stuart Pearson	
1987–91	(England) Cliff Roberts	
1991	(England) Martin Dobson	
1991–93	(Northern Ireland) Sammy McIlroy	Player-manager
1993–95	(England) John Williams	
1995–96	(England) Brian Kettle	
1996	(England) Mark Hancock	
1996–98	(England) Phil Wilson	
1998–2000	(England) Mark Gardiner	
2000–01	(England) Keith Alexander	
2001–03	(Northern Ireland) Jimmy Quinn	
2003	(England) Steve Davis	
2003	(England) Alvin McDonald	
2003–04	(England) Shaun Teale	
2004–07	(England) Steve Burr	
2007	(England) Neil Redfearn	
2007	(England) Paul Warhurst	
2007–08	(Tunisia) Dino Maamria	Player-manager
2008	(England) Mike Marsh	
2008–09	(England) Steve King	
2009–12	(England) Andy Preece	Player-manager
2012	(England) Paul Simpson	
2012	(England) Martin Foyle	
2012	(England) Andy Mutch	
2012–13	(England) Lee Ashcroft	
2013–2016	(Republic of Ireland) Jim Gannon	
2016	(England) Adam Lakeland	
2016–2017	(England) Paul Moore	
2017–2023	(England) Steve Wilkes	
2023–2024	(England) Steve Pickup	
2024-2024	(England) Matt Barnes	

| 2017–2023 | (England) Luke Goddard

== Honours and achievements ==
=== League ===
- Conference North (6th tier)
  - Champions: 2005–06
- Manchester League
  - Champions: 1902–03
- Cheshire County League
  - Champions: 1956–57

=== Cup ===
- Cheshire Senior Cup
  - Winners: 1879–80, 1880–81, 1881–82, 1883–84, 1884–85, 1888–89, 1928–29, 1936–37, 1949–50, 1954–55, 1971–72, 1976–77, 1978–79, 1983–84, 1993–94, 2009–10, 2010–11, 2013–14
  - Runners-up: 1891–92, 1896–97, 1905–06, 1908–09, 1939–40, 1947–48, 1950–51, 1963–64, 1965–66, 1968–69, 1970–71, 1977–78, 1985–86, 1998–99, 2002–03, 2006–07, 2014–15
- Mid-Cheshire Senior Cup
  - Winners: 2009–10, 2010–11, 2011–12
- Welsh Cup
  - Runners-up: 1881–82, 1888–89
- Staffordshire Senior Cup
  - Winners: 1978–79, 1979–80, 1989–90
  - Runners-up: 1986–87, 1990–91
- Conference League Cup
  - Winners: 1979–80, 1992–93
- FA Trophy
  - Winners: 1983–84
  - Runners-up: 1982–83, 1995–96
- Northern Premier League Challenge Cup
  - Winners: 1972–73
  - Runners-up: 1978–79, 2010–11
- Drinkwise Cup
  - Winners: 1992–93
