= Mario Walsh =

English footballer

Personal information
- Full name: Mario Marcus Walsh
- Date of birth: 19 January 1966 (age 60)
- Place of birth: Paddington, England
- Height: 6 ft 1 in (1.85 m)
- Position: Forward

Youth career
- Portsmouth

Senior career*
Years	Team	Apps	(Gls)
1983–1984	Portsmouth	0	(0)
1984–1987	Torquay United	100	(18)
1987–1989	Colchester United	38	(12)
1989–1990	Southend United	11	(2)
1990–1991	Colchester United	33	(17)
1991–?	Redbridge Forest	?	(?)
- * Club domestic league appearances and goals as of 11:30, 17 May 2011

Mario Marcus Walsh (born 19 January 1966) is an English former professional footballer who played as a forward.

== Career ==
Born in Paddington, Walsh played in Football League for Torquay, Colchester and Southend United, before returning to Colchester now in the Football Conference. After one season, he joined Redbridge Forest

== Honours ==
=== Club ===
Colchester United

- Football Conference Runner-up (1): 1990–91
