= Victoria Stadium (Northwich) =

Football stadium in Wincham, England

- Interactive map of Victoria Stadium
- Location: Wincham Avenue, Wincham, Northwich, England
- Coordinates: 53°16′17.74″N 2°29′02.07″W
- Capacity: 5,045 (1,179 seated)
- Surface: Grass
- Field size: 102 x 68 m

Construction
- Groundbreaking: 2003
- Opened: 2005
- Closed: Jan 2012
- Demolished: September 2013

Tenants
- Northwich Victoria (2006–2012); Northwich Villa (2006–2012); Manchester United F.C. Reserves (2007–2008)

The Victoria Stadium was a football stadium in Wincham, Northwich in the county of Cheshire, England, and was home to Northwich Victoria.

== History ==
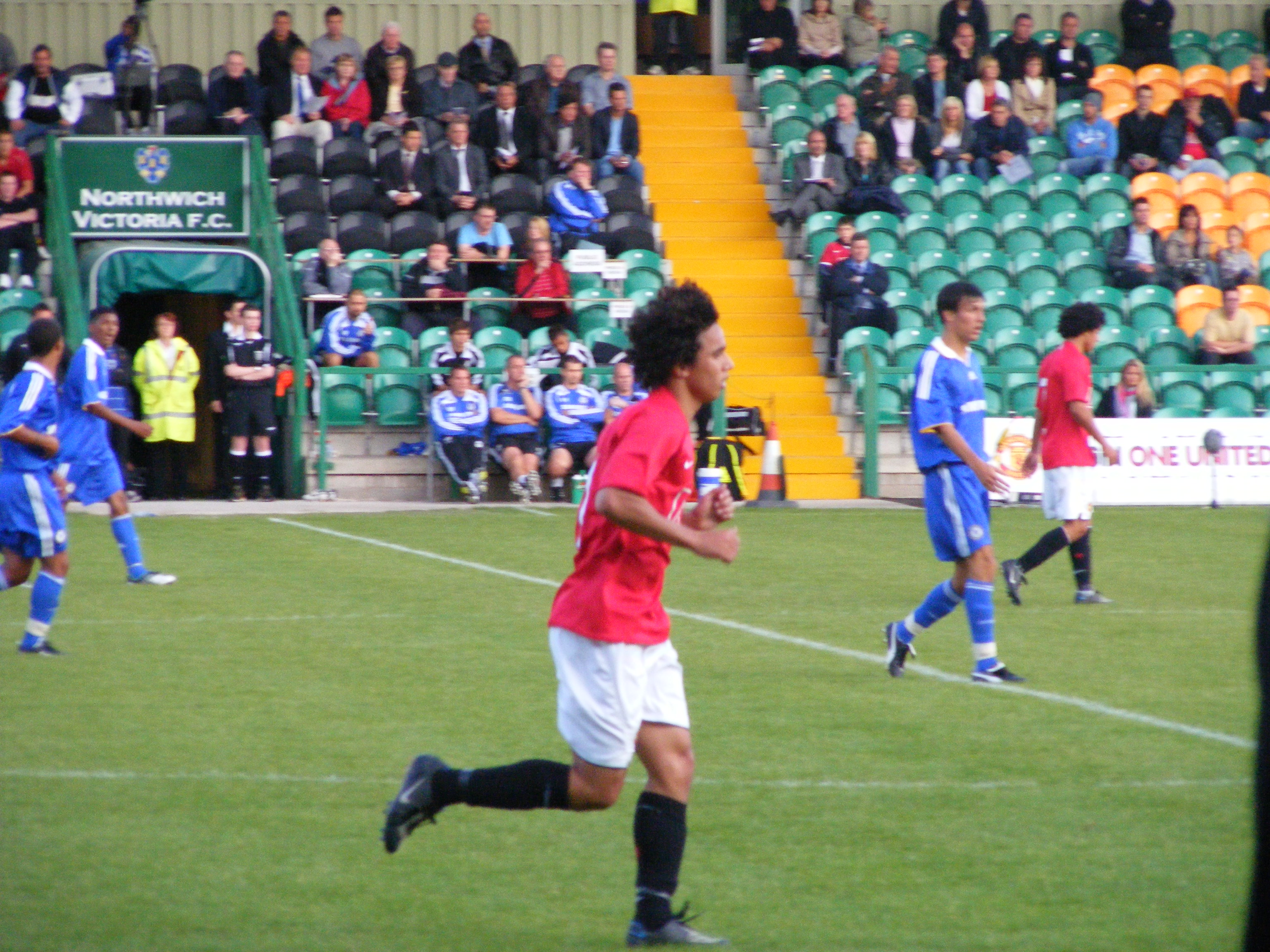
Fabio playing for Manchester United Reserves against Chelsea Reserves at the Victoria Stadium in 2008.

Following the sale of the Drill Field, Northwich's former ground in 2003, and a ground-sharing agreement with Witton Albion, Northwich moved into the Victoria Stadium in 2005. The stadium was located on a 9 acres (36,000 m^{2}) site in Wincham Business Park. The Trent and Mersey Canal passes behind the stadium and separates Northwich from their fiercest rivals Witton Albion. On 17 August 2005, Northwich played their first game at the ground, beating Gainsborough Trinity 2–0.

The ground was officially opened on 30 November 2006 by Sir Alex Ferguson, who fielded a Manchester United team in a friendly match. Manchester United Reserves played at the ground for 14 months in 2007–08 and 2008–09 reserve seasons.

However, by October 2007 Northwich's owner Mike Connett – who still owned the Victoria Stadium and the surrounding land – was actively looking to sell the club. Although a consortium led by businessman Jim Rushe took control of the club in December 2007, Victoria Stadium remained in the hands of previous owner Mike Connett. Connett's own business, Beaconet, went into receivership.

In February 2008, the ground was used for filming a new Nike advert, directed by Guy Ritchie and featuring Wayne Rooney, Cristiano Ronaldo and Carlos Tevez. It was one of only three grounds, along with the Camp Nou in Barcelona and the Emirates Stadium in London, to be selected by Nike for filming.

The future of the stadium was cast into doubt in January 2009, when then owner Mike Connett removed safety equipment from the ground; this forced Northwich to temporarily move to rivals Altrincham's Moss Lane and Witton Albion's Wincham Park grounds. It also spelt the end of Manchester United Reserve's tenancy at the stadium, as they moved their permanent home, who also moved to Moss Lane.

A team consisting of actors from Cheshire-based soap Hollyoaks and an All-Star XI consisting of former professional footballers and special guests played at the stadium on 10 October 2009 in a charity match for St. Luke's Hospice in Winsford.

A record attendance of 3,154 was achieved on the penultimate game of the 2005–06 season, when Northwich defeated their nearest rivals Stafford Rangers 3–1 to win the Conference North; however, this was bettered in the 2009–10 season on 28 November when Northwich played Lincoln City in the Second Round of the FA Cup, a game which was witnessed by 3,544 spectators.

During the 2011–12 season, Northwich were in negotiations with former owner Mike Connett to acquire Victoria Stadium but were unable to secure the funding required. The site was eventually sold to THOR Chemicals, who evicted the club and demolished the ground to build a distribution centre. The Dane Bank Stand was once again dismantled and was rebuilt at the new home of FC United of Manchester, Broadhurst Park.

== Stands ==
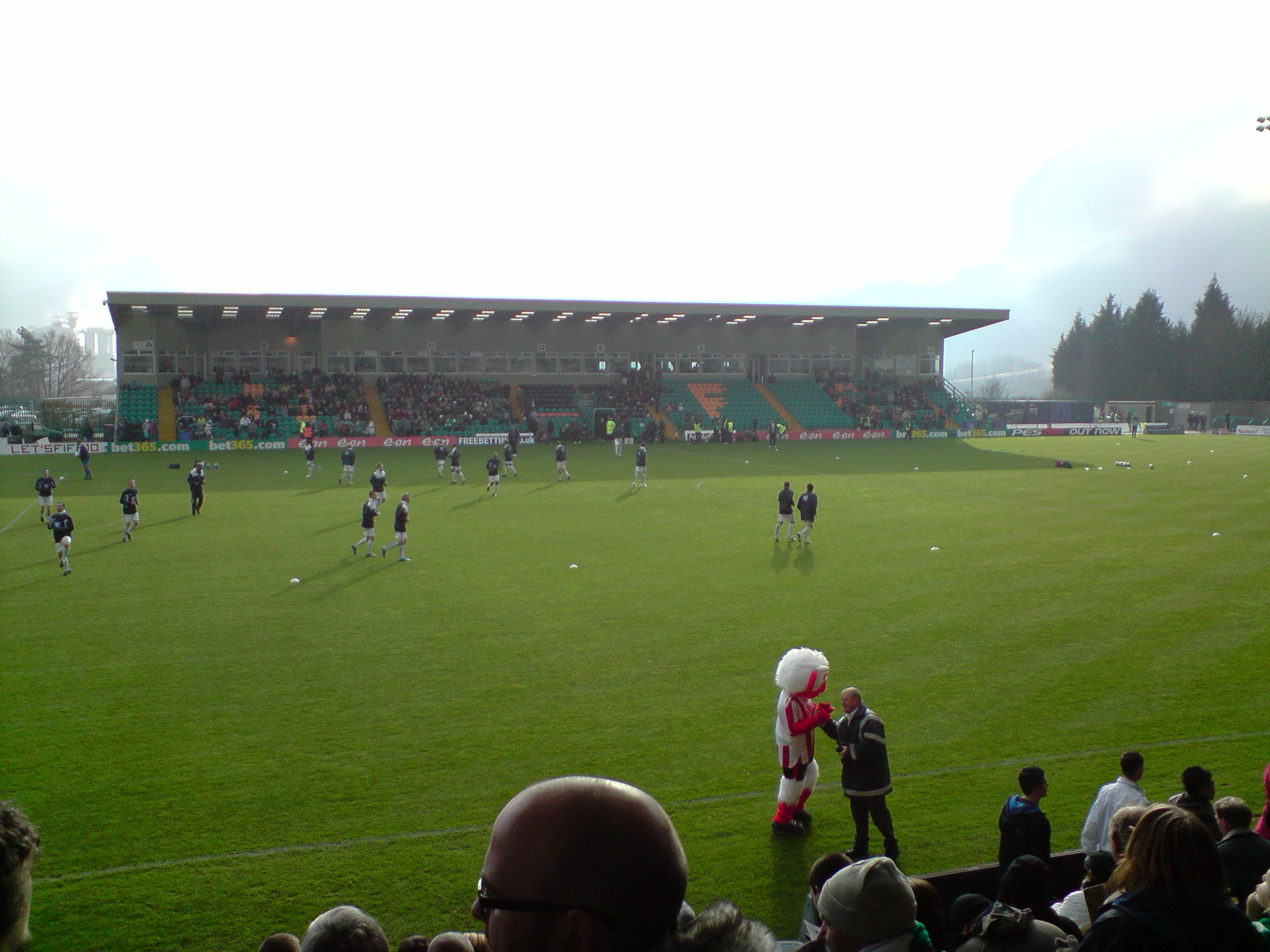
The main stand at the Victoria Stadium

The main Victoria Stand had a seating capacity of 1,180 supporters. It housed the club offices, shop, changing rooms for players and match officials, kit room, medical facilities, treatment room, fitness centre, staff and public toilets. Rare for a non-league ground, there were several executive boxes situated above the outdoor seats. The stand was also home to a bar and two restaurants. The green and yellow seating on this stand spelt out 'NVFC', the acronym for the club.

The terraced Dane Bank Stand had a capacity of 2,988 spectators, and was moved from the club's original Drill Field ground in Northwich Town Centre following the stadium's demolition. Following the closure of the Victoria Stadium, the Dane Bank Stand was once again moved. The steel-work was re-fabricated and is now the "Saint Mary's Road End" terrace at FC United of Manchester's Broadhurst Park ground.

Both of the goal-ends were open, and could accommodate 434 spectators each.
