= Mark Redshaw =

English footballer (born 1984)

Personal information
- Date of birth: 25 September 1984 (age 42)
- Place of birth: Salford, England
- Position: Striker

Youth career
- 1992–2001: Manchester United
- 2001–2003: Wrexham
- 2003–2004: Manchester City

Senior career*
Years	Team	Apps	(Gls)
2004	Radcliffe Borough	12	(3)
2004	Rossendale United		
2004–2005	Caernarfon Town	2	(0)
2005–2007	Triestina	0	(0)
2007	Los Angeles Galaxy	0	(0)
2007	Rossendale United		
2007–2008	Curzon Ashton		
2008	Stirling Lions	9	(4)
2009	Ethnikos Piraeus	1	(0)
2011	Fram Reykjavik	1	(0)
2011–2012	FC Oss	3	(1)
2012	Buxton	2	(0)
2013–2015	Celaya	0	(0)
- * Club domestic league appearances and goals

Mark Redshaw (born 25 September 1984) is an English former professional footballer who played as a striker.

== Career ==
According to a 2011 interview with the player, Redshaw signed for Manchester United at the age of eight and spent almost nine years at the club alongside schoolmate Phil Bardsley. He also played for Wrexham and Manchester City. After leaving Manchester City he played non-League football with Radcliffe Borough and Rossendale United. He moved to Caernarfon Town in December 2004. Redshaw returned to Rossendale United in September 2007, and joined Curzon Ashton in November.

He has also played in Australia for Stirling Lions, in Greece for Ethnikos Piraeus, in Iceland for Fram Reykjavik, and in the Netherlands for FC Oss.

Redshaw's move to Conference North club Chester in September 2012 fell through over problems with international clearance. He played a match for League One club Bury's reserve team as a trialist in November.

He played twice for Buxton in the Northern Premier League in October 2013 before moving to Mexico. After a trial with Mérida, he signed for Ascenso MX club Celaya in December. and made his debut in the Copa MX group stage win at Querétaro on 22 January 2014.

== Personal life ==
His father is Ray Redshaw, and his brother is Jack, both of whom are footballers.

He was sentenced to three years imprisonment in January 2024 for his part in a major drugs operation in Darwen. Seventeen people received custodial sentences following the importation of amphetamine and cannabis from mainland Europe.
