= Ray Redshaw =

English footballer

Personal information
- Date of birth: 23 December 1958 (age 67)
- Place of birth: Salford, England
- Position: Striker

Youth career
- Leeds United

Senior career*
Years	Team	Apps	(Gls)
- Leeds United
1982–1983	Hyde United	30	(10)
- Salford City
- Southport
- Northwich Victoria
1984–1985	Wigan Athletic	4	(0)
- Macclesfield Town
- Papatoetoe
- Northwich Victoria
- Accrington Stanley
- Chorley
- Horwich RMI
- Rossendale United
	Radcliffe Borough	19	(2)

International career
- England C
- * Club domestic league appearances and goals

Ray Redshaw (born 23 December 1958) is an English former professional footballer.

Redshaw played for many teams which included Leeds United, Wigan Athletic, Hyde United, Salford City, Southport, Macclesfield Town, Northwich Victoria, Accrington Stanley, Chorley, Horwich RMI, Radcliffe Borough and in New Zealand with Papatoetoe.

Redshaw played at Wigan Athletic with the likes of Paul Jewell, Mike Newell and Steve Walsh in the mid 1980s and made his debut against West Brom in 1984.

Redshaw also represented England at C level.

Redshaw has two sons who became professional footballers; Mark and Jack.
