= Stuart McManus =

Scottish footballer

Personal information
- Full name: Stuart Joseph McManus
- Date of birth: 19 March 1965 (age 61)
- Place of birth: Falkirk, Scotland
- Height: 5 ft 11 in (1.80 m)
- Position: Forward

Youth career
- Tottenham Hotspur

Senior career*
| Years | Team | Apps | (Gls) |
| 1983–1986 | Southampton | 2 | (1) |
| 1985 | → Newport County (loan) | 5 | (0) |
| 1986 | Örgryte | | |
| 1986–1987 | Sandviken | | |
| 1987–1988 | Gefle | | |
| 1988–1991 | Örgryte | | |
| 1992–1994 | Lillestrøm | | |
| 1994 | Moss | | |
| 1995–2003 | Örgryte | | |
| 2003 | Ljusne | | |
| 2010–2016 | Hagaström | | |
- * Club domestic league appearances and goals

Stuart Joseph McManus (born 19 March 1965) is a Scottish retired footballer who played as a forward for Southampton and Newport County, before a long career in Sweden and Norway, which ended with him playing as a goalkeeper in the lower levels of Swedish football.

He is the father of Swedish curler Sara McManus.

== Playing career ==
=== England and Wales ===
McManus was born in Falkirk, Scotland but moved to the south-east of England as a child, where he represented Surrey Schools. He was an associate schoolboy with Tottenham Hotspur but failed to make the grade at White Hart Lane.

In August 1983, he was studying for a Diploma in PE in Farnham, and joined Southampton on a non-contract basis. He made his debut for the reserves on 27 August 1983, scoring in each of the first two matches of the season; in his three years at The Dell he made 71 reserve team appearances, scoring 28 goals. In July 1984, he signed a professional contract and was loaned to Newport County in August and September 1985, where he played five matches without scoring.

He made his first-team debut on 11 March 1986 when he replaced Danny Wallace at outside-right for the First Division match against Queens Park Rangers at Loftus Road. McManus scored in the 23rd minute with a header from a deep cross from David Armstrong as the Saints recorded a 2–0 victory. He retained his place for the next match, at home to Liverpool, but was substituted for Andy Townsend. McManus was released in the summer of 1986.

=== Scandinavia ===
Following his release by Southampton, McManus moved to Sweden to join Örgryte on a free transfer in June 1986 but very shortly joined Sandviken. The following summer, he moved to Gefle for a year, before returning to Örgryte in 1988, where he remained for a further three years.

By 1992, he had moved to Norway and joined Lillestrøm for two years. He was a member of the Lillestrøm team that reached the final of the Norwegian Football Cup in 1992, where they were beaten 3–2 by Rosenborg. As Rosenborg also won the Norwegian Premier League title, Lillestrøm qualified for the 1993–94 European Cup Winners' Cup. McManus scored for Lillestrøm in the Qualifying Round against Estonian side Nikol Tallinn, but Lillestrom were eliminated in the First Round by Torino.

After a brief time at Moss, he returned to Örgryte for a third spell, which lasted until 2003, when he joined Ljusne. In 2003, McManus was involved in two incidents with referees: having already been banned for five matches for assaulting a referee on 22 June, he was playing for Ljusne in August in a Fourth Division match against Delsbo. He collided with the referee, who suffered a cracked rib. McManus was charged with deliberately colliding with the referee; McManus protested his innocence and claimed that he was the victim of a "witch hunt". Before the disciplinary committee could pass judgement on the case, McManus announced his retirement from professional football.

In 2010, he played a few matches as a goalkeeper for Hagaström.

== Honours ==
Lillestrøm

- Norwegian Football Cup runners-up: 1992

== Bibliography ==
- Chalk, Gary; Holley, Duncan; Bull, David (2013). All the Saints – A Complete Players' Who's Who of Southampton FC. Hagiology Publishing. ISBN 978-0-9926864-0-6.
- Holley, Duncan; Chalk, Gary (1992). The Alphabet of the Saints. ACL & Polar Publishing. ISBN 0-9514862-3-3.
- Holley, Duncan; Chalk, Gary (2003). In That Number – A Post-war Chronicle of Southampton FC. Hagiology Publishing. ISBN 0-9534474-3-X.
