= Neale Marmon =

English footballer

Personal information
- Full name: Neale Gordon Marmon
- Date of birth: 21 April 1961 (age 65)
- Place of birth: Bournemouth, England
- Height: 6 ft 2 in (1.88 m)
- Position: Centre-back

Youth career
- Plymouth Argyle

Senior career*
Years	Team	Apps	(Gls)
1979–1980	Torquay United	4	(0)
1982–1983	SC Rinteln		
1983–1984	TuS Hessisch Oldendorf	28	(4)
1984–1989	VfL Osnabrück	169	(13)
1989–1990	Hannover 96	13	(0)
1990–1991	Colchester United	59	(6)
1991–1993	FC Homburg	54	(2)
1993–1996	FSV Salmrohr		
1996–1997	SV Elversberg	26	(0)
2001	SV Bliesen		

Managerial career
- 1996–2001: SV Elversberg
- 2002: Preußen Münster
- FC Kutzhof
- 2011–?: SG Schwemlingen/Tünsdorf/Ballern
- 2019: Yeovil Town (caretaker)
- * Club domestic league appearances and goals

Neale Gordon Marmon (born 21 April 1961) is an English former footballer who spent the majority of his career in Germany. He was most recently the interim manager of Yeovil Town.

Marmon, son of an officer in the British Army, grew up partly in Germany. Apart from football, Marmon also won a state swimming championship in Lower Saxony, and was an outstanding basketballer. He became the central figure of FC Homburg's shock 4–2 away cup win over Bayern Munich in August 1991.

== Career ==
Marmon spent his early football years at Plymouth Argyle and Torquay United, making four appearances for the later in the 1979–80 season. In 1982, he joined SC Rinteln and, the following year, TuS Hessisch-Oldendorf, two amateur clubs from the German state of Lower Saxony. With Hessisch-Oldendorf, he played in the third division Oberliga Nord for a season before joining VfL Osnabrück in the same league.

He began his professional football career in Germany with VfL Osnabrück in the 2. Bundesliga in 1985, having won the Oberliga championship the previous year. After five seasons with the club, he was transferred to Hannover 96 for the sum of DM 150,000. He played with the Hanover club for half a season in the 2. Bundesliga but fell out with manager Slobodan Cendic and moved to his country of birth, joining Colchester United in January 1990 to play in the Fourth Division. Despite having only spend half a season with the club, he became Colchester's player of the year in 1990.

Colchester was relegated to non-league football at the end of the 1989–90 season and Marmon remained with the club to see the side finish runners-up in the Football Conference.

Marmon returned to Germany in 1991, spending a further two seasons in the German second division, now with FC 08 Homburg. He became the hero of the club's 4–2 extra time DFB-Pokal victory over Bayern Munich in Munich on 17 August 1991, when he successfully neutralised Bayern's forwards. Dropping out of fully professional football, he remained in south-western Germany and spent time with third division sides FSV Salmrohr and, later, SV Elversberg, first becoming player-manager and later manager with the club. Marmon coached Elversberg from December 1996 to April 2001, when he was dismissed, followed by a short spell at SC Preußen Münster in 2002. He had two more spells with local German southwest amateur clubs as player and manager following his time in Münster.

In 2011, he became coach of local amateur side SG Schwemlingen/Tünsdorf/Ballern.

In 2019, Marmon was brought in to support manager Darren Way at League Two club Yeovil Town and following his sacking in March he was installed as caretaker manager. On 8 May 2019, with the collapse of the takeover of the club following Yeovil's relegation to the National League, Marmon left the club with immediate effect.

== Personal life ==
Post full-time football, Marmon, worked for a sports article manufacturer, living alternately in London and Merzig, Germany. He got married in 2007.

By profession, he is a qualified sports teacher as well as a physical therapist.

== Career statistics ==
=== Managerial ===
As of match played 4 May 2019

Managerial record by team and tenure
Team	From	To	Record					Ref.
Team	From	To	P	W	D	L	Win %	Ref.
Yeovil Town (caretaker)	24 March 2019	8 May 2019	7	0	4	3	0.0	
Total			7	0	4	3	0.0	—

== Honours ==
Colchester United

- Football Conference runner-up: 1990–91
