= Danny Carter =

English footballer

Personal information
- Full name: Darren Stephen Carter
- Date of birth: 29 June 1969 (age 57)
- Place of birth: Hackney, England
- Position: Midfielder

Youth career
- 1985–1987: Brighton & Hove Albion

Senior career*
Years	Team	Apps	(Gls)
1987–1988	Billericay Town		
1988–1995	Leyton Orient	188	(22)
1995–1997	Peterborough United	45	(1)
1997–1999	Barry Town	60	(10)
1999–2005	Merthyr Tydfil		
2005–2006	Cardiff Grange Harlequins	8	(0)
2006	Clevedon Town		
Total		301	(33)
- * Club domestic league appearances and goals

Daniel Stephen Carter (born 29 June 1969) is an English former professional footballer who played as a midfielder in the Football League for Leyton Orient and Peterborough United.

== Club career ==
Carter started his career as an apprentice at Brighton & Hove Albion but failed to make the grade for the first team. He made his first team debut in April 1987 in a 1–1 draw with Blackburn Rovers, coming on as a substitute and almost scoring with his first touch. He subsequently dropped down to the Isthmian League where he spent a season with Billericay Town. He was signed by Fourth Division side Leyton Orient in July 1988 and remained a first team regular in his seven-year spell at the club, which included promotion to the Third Division in his first season with via the play-offs. In June 1995, he joined newly relegated Second Division side Peterborough United for a fee of £25,000. He was a first team regular in his first season with the club but dropped out of the side in his second season as the club narrowly avoided relegation twice. Following his release he spent time on trial at Cambridge United and Wycombe Wanderers, however, both were unsuccessful in earning a full-time contract. He subsequently signed for Welsh Premier League side Barry Town, where he spent two seasons and made a total of sixty league appearances, scoring ten goals. He later joined Southern League Premier side Merthyr Tydfil in 1999 and spent six seasons with the club making over 200 appearances. He was also the club captain. In the summer of 2005 he signed for newly promoted Welsh Premier League side Cardiff Grange Harlequins but only made eight league appearances and the side couldn't avoid relegation at the first attempt.

== Managerial career ==
Carter was assistant manager for Merthyr Tydfil and then the reformed Merthyr Town for seven years between 2007 and 2014, where he assisted Garry Shephard. As Merthyr Town the side won back-to-back titles and promotions in the Western League under the duo but failed to gain promotion to the Southern League Premier after two successive play-off final defeats. The pair resigned in May 2014 after a defeat to Paulton Rovers.
