= Dave Leworthy =

English footballer (born 1962)

David Leworthy
Personal information
- Date of birth: 22 October 1962 (age 64)
- Place of birth: Portsmouth, England
- Height: 5 ft 9 in (1.75 m)
- Position: Forward

Senior career*
Years	Team	Apps	(Gls)
1981–1982	Portsmouth	1	(0)
1982–1984	Fareham Town	84	(44)
1984–1985	Tottenham Hotspur	11	(5)
1985–1989	Oxford United	31	(9)
1987–1988	→ Shrewsbury Town (loan)	6	(3)
1989–1992	Reading	27	(8)
1991	→ Colchester United (loan)	9	(4)
1991–1993	Farnborough Town	71	(64)
1993–1997	Dover Athletic	152	(86)
1997	Rushden & Diamonds	18	(8)
1997–2000	Kingstonian	132	(66)
2000–2003	Havant & Waterlooville	49	(26)
2006	Kingstonian		

Managerial career
- 1995: Dover Athletic (joint caretaker)
- 2004: Havant & Waterlooville
- 2007–2008: Banstead Athletic
- 2008–2009: Croydon (joint)
- * Club domestic league appearances and goals as of 22:30, 14 March 2012 (UTC)

David Leworthy (born 22 October 1962) is an English retired footballer who played as a centre forward.

== Career ==
Leworthy started his career with his hometown club Portsmouth. After spending 9 years with Pompey, from the age of 10, he moved to Non-League Fareham Town where his prolific goalscoring record there earned him a dream move to Tottenham Hotspur. Leworthy made his Spurs debut in the North London derby, against arch rivals Arsenal, that ended in a 2–0 defeat at White Hart Lane in front of a crowd of 40,399 on 17 April 1985. He played alongside the likes of Glenn Hoddle, Ossie Ardillies, Graham Roberts and Steve Perryman and went on to make a further ten appearances in total, scoring 4 goals.

In December 1985, Leworthy moved to fellow First Division side Oxford Utd for a transfer fee of £200,000. He spent 4 years at the club and made 37 appearances, scoring 8 goals - most notably against Manchester United. Following a loan spell at Shrewsbury Town, he then moved to Reading in 1989 where he would spend 3 years. He was loaned to Colchester Utd towards the end of the 1990/1991 season, scoring 4 goals in 9 appearances and helping the U's to a 2nd-place finish in the Vauxhall Conference as runners-up to Barnet.

Leworthy returned to the Vauxhall Conference the following season with Farnborough Town, following a permanent switch from Reading ahead of the 1991/1992 season. Leworthy had a couple of very successful seasons at Cherrywood Road and finished the 1992/1993 season as the Vauxhall Conference top goalscorer with 32 League goals (39 in all competitions) despite the club being relegated. He remained in the division following Farnborough's relegation and was sold to newly promoted Dover Athletic in a move that saw the non-league transfer record broken when the Kent club paid £50,000 for his services. Leworthy continued his prolific goalscoring exploits at Crabble and scored 86 times in a total of 158 appearances. He netted all four goals in Dover's 4–3 win over Woking in February 1996, and netted a hat-trick in the very same fixture the following season, just seven months later, which ended in 5–1 victory for Dover in September 1996.

In January 1997 Leworthy moved to fellow Football Conference side Rushden & Diamonds for a fee of £15,000, and his goals in the final 4 months of the season, including a debut goal against his former club Farnborough Town, helped ease the club away from the relegation zone and into a midtable finish. However, his stay at Rushden didn't last long, and at the end of the season he moved to South-West London club Kingstonian for a club record fee of £18,000. Leworthy was part of the Kingstonian side that celebrated two consecutive FA Trophy wins at Wembley Stadium in 1999 and 2000.

Leworthy's career began to draw to a close with a period at Conference South club Havant & Waterlooville that included a spell as manager.

Leworthy came out of retirement in 2006 for a brief second spell at Kingstonian. He was named manager of Banstead Athletic of the Combined Counties League Premier Division in December 2007. He left Banstead in October 2008 and became joint manager of Croydon alongside Peter Thomas in November. Peter Thomas left the club in January the following year.

Whilst at Dover Athletic in the Mid 1990s, Leworthy was selected for the England C Squad (Non League), and represented England at Elgin City FC in the North of Scotland against the Scottish Highland Football League.

Leworthy is now long retired from the game but still supports his hometown club Portsmouth.

== Honours ==
Colchester United

- Football Conference runner-up: 1990–91

Kingstonian

- FA Trophy: 1998–99, 1999–2000
- Bob Lord Trophy runner-up: 1999–2000.* Ryman Premier League winners 1997. * 4 England c caps. * Vauxhall Conference Golden Boot 1993. * Vauxhall Conference Team of the year 1993.
- Vauxhall Conference Charity Shield Winner 1999, 2000.
