= 1991–92 Colchester United F.C. season =

Colchester United
1991–92 season
- Chairman: James Bowdidge
- Manager: Roy McDonough
- Stadium: Layer Road
- Conference: 1st (promoted)
- FA Cup: 1st round (eliminated by Exeter City)
- FA Trophy: Winners
- Bob Lord Trophy: 3rd round (eliminated by Wycombe Wanderers)
- Top goalscorer: League: Roy McDonough (26); All: Roy McDonough (29)
- Highest home attendance: 7,193 v Barrow, 2 May 1992
- Lowest home attendance: 919 v Wycombe Wanderers, 16 December 1991
- Average home league attendance: 3,381
- Biggest win: 5–0 v Bath City, 31 August 1991 v Burton Albion, 26 October 1991 v Barrow, 2 May 1992
- Biggest defeat: 2–6 v Wycombe Wanderers, 16 December 1991
Home colours

The 1991–92 season was Colchester United's 50th season in their history and their second consecutive season in the Conference, the fifth tier of English football and the highest tier of non-League football in England. Alongside competing in the Conference, the club also participated in the FA Cup, the FA Trophy and the Bob Lord Trophy.

Manager Ian Atkins left for a coaching role at Birmingham City in the summer after narrowly missing out on the Conference title the previous campaign. Experienced forward Roy McDonough was appointed the club's new player-manager tasked with taking Colchester United back to the Football League. Both Colchester and Wycombe Wanderers ended the season on 94 points, with the U's promoted on superior goal difference.

In the FA Cup, Colchester went out in the first round to Exeter City, while McDonough fielded a weakened side in the Bob Lord Trophy, crashing out 6–2 to league rivals Wycombe. However, in the FA Trophy, following two replay wins in the first two rounds of the competition, the U's reached the Wembley final, where they faced Witton Albion, who had dumped them out at the quarter-final stage the previous season. Colchester won the match 3–1 to complete a non-League double.

== Season overview ==
Following Ian Atkins decision to return to Birmingham City in a coaching capacity, new chairman James Bowdidge appointed Roy McDonough in a player-manager role. Having been Atkins' assistant, McDonough promised to abandon Atkins' sweeper system and to instead promote a more attacking formula.

McDonough himself equalled a club record by scoring four goals in a game at Slough Town in August. On 28 September 1991, in Colchester's top-of-the-table clash against rivals Wycombe Wanderers at Adams Park, Scott Barrett became the first Colchester goalkeeper to score from open play. His long upfield goal kick in the 90th minute of the game bounced over Wycombe goalkeeper Paul Hyde and sealed what would prove to be a vital 2–1 win.

In November, the U's became the first team to be knocked out of the FA Cup without conceding a goal. After seeing off Burton Albion 5–0 in the fourth qualifying round, they twice drew 0–0 with Exeter City in the first round and following replay, only to lose on penalties.

As 1992 dawned, Colchester found themselves seven points ahead of nearest rivals Wycombe in the league, but 16 home wins in succession failed to shake off their Buckinghamshire counterparts. A poor 4–1 defeat at Welling United and a lackadaisical 4–4 draw at Macclesfield Town threatened to derail the U's attempts to reach the Football League.

Meanwhile, Colchester were focused on their FA Trophy cup run. Kingstonian and Merthyr Tydfil were dispatched in replays following a 2–2 and 0–0 draw respectively. The U's then saw off Morecambe and Telford United convincingly, and then a 4–1 aggregate win over Macclesfield in the semi-final. They progressed to the Wembley final, with the tie to be played after the final fixture of the Conference season.

Going into the last game of the season, it was evident McDonough had delivered on his promise of attacking football. The U's found themselves level on points with Wycombe, but crucially carried an eight-goal advantage. United beat already relegated Barrow 5–0 at Layer Road with a Mike Masters hat-trick sealing the Conference championship. McDonough had scored 29 goals, with 26 for Steve McGavin and 18 for Gary Bennett, with a total of 98 league goals achieved.

A week after the promotion celebrations at Layer Road, a crowd of 32,254 witnessed Colchester United in their first-ever Wembley appearance. A famous non-League double was achieved as they gained revenge over Witton Albion, who had dumped the U's out of the competition last campaign. Colchester won 3–1 courtesy of goals from Mike Masters, Steve McGavin and Nicky Smith. Thousands of fans packed Colchester High Street a few days later as the U's team paraded their trophies around the town.

== Players ==
As of match played 10 May 1992.

Name	Position	Nationality	Place of birth	Date of birth	Apps	Goals	Signed from	Date signed	Fee
Goalkeepers
Scott Barrett	GK	(England)	Ilkeston	2 April 1963 (aged 28)	64	0	(England) Stoke City	Summer 1990	£25,000
Defenders
Tony English	DF/MF	(England)	Luton	19 October 1966 (aged 24)	308	40	(England) Coventry City	24 December 1984	Free transfer
James Goodwin	DF	(England)	Colchester	20 July 1974 (aged 16)	0	0	Apprentice	8 October 1991 (Note: Date of signing refers to the date of the player's first game for the club)	Free transfer
Martin Grainger	FB	(England)	Enfield Town	23 August 1972 (aged 18)	16	2	Apprentice	16 December 1989	Free transfer
Andy Partner	CB	(England)	Colchester	21 October 1974 (aged 16)	0	0	Apprentice	16 December 1991	Free transfer
Ian Phillips	FB	(Scotland)	Cumnock	23 April 1959 (aged 32)	175	10	(England) Kettering Town	26 August 1991 (Note: Date of signing refers to the date of the player's first game in his second spell for the club)	Undisclosed (Note: Joined as player-coach)
Paul Roberts	DF	(England)	West Ham	27 April 1962 (aged 29)	0	0	(England) Fisher Athletic	28 September 1991	£750
Midfielders
Eamonn Collins	MF	(Republic of Ireland)	Dublin	22 October 1965 (aged 25)	87	5	(England) Portsmouth	May 1989	Free transfer
Jason Cook	MF	(England)	Edmonton	29 December 1969 (aged 21)	0	0	(England) Southend United	28 September 1991	Free transfer
Robbie Devereux	MF	(England)	Great Cornard	31 January 1971 (aged 20)	2	0	(England) Cornard United	February 1992	Non-contract
Warren Donald	MF/FB	(England)	Hillingdon	7 October 1964 (aged 26)	46	1	(England) Northampton Town	27 August 1990	Free transfer
Wayne Hannigan	MF	(Republic of Ireland)			1	0	(Republic of Ireland) Home Farm	26 February 1991	Undisclosed
Mark Kinsella	MF	(Republic of Ireland)	Dublin	12 August 1972 (aged 18)	21	0	(Republic of Ireland) Home Farm	18 August 1989	Free transfer
Nicky Smith	LM	(England)	Berkeley	28 January 1969 (aged 22)	41	0	(England) Southend United	18 August 1990	Free transfer
Forwards
Paul Abrahams	FW/WG	(England)	Colchester	31 October 1973 (aged 17)	0	0	Apprentice	26 August 1991	Free transfer
Gary Bennett	WG	(England)	Enfield Town	13 November 1970 (aged 20)	94	19	(England) Tottenham Hotpsur	21 October 1988	Free transfer
Julian Dart	FW	(England)	Luton	25 September 1973 (aged 17)	0	0	Apprentice	14 January 1992	Free transfer
Roy McDonough	FW	(England)	Solihull	16 October 1958 (aged 32)	140	35	(England) Southend United	13 October 1990	Part exchange
Steve McGavin	FW	(England)	North Walsham	24 January 1969 (aged 22)	8	0	(England) Sudbury Town	1 April 1991	£10,000
Steve Restarick	FW	(England)	Barking	28 November 1971 (aged 19)	3	2	(England) West Ham United	Early 1988–89 season	Free transfer

== Transfers ==
=== In ===
Date	Position	Nationality	Name	From	Fee	Ref.
Summer 1991	DF	(England)	Simon Gray	(England) Ipswich Town	Non-contract	
26 August 1991	FW/WG	(England)	Paul Abrahams	Apprentice	Free transfer	(Note: Date of signing refers to the date of the player's first game for the club)
26 August 1991	FB	(Scotland)	Ian Phillips	(England) Kettering Town	Undisclosed	(Note: Date of signing refers to the date of the player's first game in his second spell for the club) (Note: Joined as player-coach)
7 September 1991	DF	(England)	James Goodwin	Apprentice	Free transfer	
28 September 1991	MF	(England)	Jason Cook	(England) Southend United	Free transfer	
28 September 1991	DF	(England)	Paul Roberts	(England) Fisher Athletic	£750	
8 October 1991	FW	(England)	Sean Duffett	(England) Gas Recreation	Free transfer	
16 December 1991	CB	(England)	Andy Partner	Apprentice	Free transfer	
14 January 1992	FW	(England)	Julian Dart	Apprentice	Free transfer	
18 January 1992	FW	(United States)	Mike Masters	(United States) San Francisco Bay Blackhawks	Undisclosed	
February 1992	MF	(England)	Robbie Devereux	(England) Cornard United	Non-contract	
11 February 1992	WG	(Northern Ireland)	Ian Stewart	(England) Aldershot	Free transfer	

- Total spending: ▼ ~ £750

=== Out ===
Date	Position	Nationality	Name	To	Fee	Ref.
End of season	FB	(United States)	Marcelle Bruce	(England) Baldock Town	Released	
End of season	CB	(England)	Neale Marmon	(Germany) FC Homburg	Undisclosed	
End of season	FB	(England)	Gary Osbourne	(England) Cradley Town	Released	
30 June 1991	CB	(England)	Ian Atkins	(England) Birmingham City	Free transfer	(Note: Joined as player-assistant manager)
17 August 1991	FW	(England)	Mario Walsh	(England) Redbridge Forest	£15,000	(Note: Date of departure refers to the date of the player's final game for the club)
8 October 1991	FW	(England)	Sean Duffett	(England) Wivenhoe Town	Released	
16 December 1991	DF	(England)	Simon Gray	(England) Wivenhoe Town	Released	
2 May 1992	CB	(England)	Shaun Elliott	(England) Gateshead	Released	
2 May 1992	WG	(Northern Ireland)	Ian Stewart	(England) Harrow Borough	Released	
10 May 1992	FW	(United States)	Mike Masters	(England) Newbury Town	Released	

- Total incoming: ▲ ~ £15,000

=== Loans in ===
Date	Position	Nationality	Name	From	End date	Ref.
24 March 1992	MF/CB	(England)	Dave Martin	(England) Southend United	10 May 1992	(Note: Loan start and end dates refer to the date of the player's first and final games for the club)

=== Loans out ===
Date	Position	Nationality	Name	To	End date	Ref.
	MF	(Republic of Ireland)	Wayne Hannigan	(England) Wivenhoe Town		
	FW	(England)	Steve Restarick	(England) Wivenhoe Town		
	FW	(England)	Mario Walsh	(England) Kettering Town		

== Match details ==
=== Conference ===
==== League table ====
Pos	Team	Pld	W	D	L	GF	GA	GD	Pts	Promotion or relegation
1	Colchester United (C, P)	42	28	10	4	98	40	+58	94	Promotion to the Football League Third Division
2	Wycombe Wanderers	42	30	4	8	84	35	+49	94	
3	Kettering Town	42	20	13	9	72	50	+22	73	
4	Merthyr Tydfil	42	18	14	10	59	56	+3	68	
5	Farnborough Town	42	18	12	12	68	53	+15	66	

(C) Champions; (P) Promoted

==== Results round by round ====
Round	1	2	3	4	5	6	7	8	9	10	11	12	13	14	15	16	17	18	19	20	21	22	23	24	25	26	27	28	29	30	31	32	33	34	35	36	37	38	39	40	41	42
Ground	H	A	A	H	A	H	H	A	A	H	H	A	A	H	A	H	A	A	H	A	H	A	A	H	A	H	A	A	H	A	A	H	H	A	H	H	H	H	A	A	H	H
Result	W	D	W	W	D	L	W	D	W	D	W	W	W	W	W	W	D	D	W	W	W	L	W	W	L	W	D	D	W	L	W	W	W	D	W	W	W	W	W	D	W	W
Position	3	5	2	2	2	3	2	3	4	4	3	3	2	2	1	1	1	1	1	1	1	1	1	1	1	1	1	1	1	1	1	1	1	1	1	1	1	1	1	1	1	1

Source: Statto.com (archived)
A = Away; H = Home; W = Win; D = Draw; L = Loss

==== Matches ====
17 August 1991 1	Colchester United	2–0	Macclesfield Town	Colchester
15:00 BST	Bennett 10'; McGavin 45'	Report		Stadium: Layer Road; Attendance: 2,233

24 August 1991 2	Barrow	1–1	Colchester United	Barrow-in-Furness
15:00 BST	Cowperthwaite 49'	Report	Kinsella 5'	Stadium: Holker Street; Attendance: 1,480; Referee: R Poulain

26 August 1991 3	Slough Town	2–4	Colchester United	Slough
	O'Connor 6'; Thompson 12'; Donnellan (red card) 90'	Report	McDonough 4', 24', 28', 41'	Stadium: Wexham Park Stadium; Attendance: 2,226

31 August 1991 4	Colchester United	5–0	Bath City	Colchester
15:00 BST	McGavin 28', 51'; Bennett 32', 39', 87'	Report		Stadium: Layer Road; Attendance: 2,416; Referee: M Hair

7 September 1991 5	Witton Albion	2–2	Colchester United	Northwich
15:00 BST	Thomas 19'; Ellis 60'	Report	Collins 27'; McDonough 47'	Stadium: Wincham Park; Attendance: 1,045; Referee: K Whittaker

10 September 1991 6	Colchester United	2–3	Farnborough Town	Colchester
19:30 BST	McGavin 21'; Collins 86'	Report	Coombs 25'; Read 45', 67'	Stadium: Layer Road; Attendance: 2,954; Referee: W Norbury

13 September 1991 7	Colchester United	4–0	Yeovil Town	Colchester
19:30 BST	English 41'; Bennett 51', 90'; McGavin 56'	Report		Stadium: Layer Road; Attendance: 2,979; Referee: I Mitchell

21 September 1991 8	Cheltenham Town	1–1	Colchester United	Cheltenham
15:00 BST	Owen 40'	Report	McDonough 15'	Stadium: Whaddon Road; Attendance: 1,157; Referee: K Leach

28 September 1991 9	Wycombe Wanderers	1–2	Colchester United	High Wycombe
15:00 BST	Guppy 57'	Report	Smith 49'; Barrett 90'	Stadium: Adams Park; Attendance: 5,186; Referee: Clive Wilkes

5 October 1991 10	Colchester United	3–3	Altrincham	Colchester
15:00 BST	Anderson 16' (o.g.); McGavin 35'; McDonough 70' (pen.)	Report	McKenna 19'; Anderson 50'; Brady 76' (pen.)	Stadium: Layer Road; Attendance: 2,853; Referee: Graham Poll

12 October 1991 11	Colchester United	2–1	Runcorn	Colchester
15:00 BST	Bennett 52'; McDonough 86' (pen.)	Report	Redmond 69'	Stadium: Layer Road; Attendance: 2,617; Referee: A Danskin

18 October 1991 12	Telford United	0–3	Colchester United	Telford
19:45 BST		Report	McDonough 9', 23' (pen.); Smith 38'	Stadium: Bucks Head; Attendance: 1,109; Referee: T Atkinson

30 October 1991 13	Yeovil Town	0–1	Colchester United	Yeovil
19:30 GMT		Report	McGavin 90'	Stadium: Huish Park; Attendance: 2,385

2 November 1991 14	Colchester United	2–0	Stafford Rangers	Colchester
15:00 GMT	Smith 35'; McDonough 41'	Report		Stadium: Layer Road; Attendance: 2,139; Referee: G Pearson

9 November 1991 15	Farnborough Town	0–2	Colchester United	Farnborough
15:00 GMT		Report	Bennett 67'; Elliott 80'	Stadium: Cherrywood Road; Attendance: 3,069; Referee: S Tomlin

23 November 1991 16	Colchester United	3–1	Welling United	Colchester
15:00 GMT	Bennett 51'; Cook 60'; English 73'	Report	Robbins 62'	Stadium: Layer Road; Attendance: 2,933; Referee: D Orr

30 November 1991 17	Nortwich Victoria	1–1	Colchester United	Northwich
15:00 GMT	Butler 44' (pen.)	Report	McDonough 64'	Stadium: Drill Field; Attendance: 1,042; Referee: J McGrath

3 December 1991 18	Stafford Rangers	3–3	Colchester United	Stafford
	Wolverson 59'; Simpson 58'; Bradshaw 86'	Report	Bennett 41', 77'; McGavin 66'	Stadium: Marston Road; Attendance: 961; Referee: R Andrews

7 December 1991 19	Colchester United	3–0	Wycombe Wanderers	Colchester
	Bennett 33'; McGavin 62', 86'	Report		Stadium: Layer Road; Attendance: 5,086; Referee: Paul Taylor

14 December 1991 20	Gateshead	0–2	Colchester United	Gateshead
13:30 GMT		Report	Bennett 5'; McDonough 30'	Stadium: Gateshead International Stadium; Attendance: 542; Referee: G Bradbury

21 December 1991 21	Colchester United	3–2	Witton Albion	Colchester
15:00 GMT	McGavin 3'; Bennett 9'; English 79'	Report	Thomas 42', 63'	Stadium: Layer Road; Attendance: 2,842

26 December 1991 22	Redbridge Forest	2–1	Colchester United	Dagenham
	Pamphlett 20'; Walsh 81'	Report	McDonough 15'	Stadium: Victoria Road; Attendance: 2,327; Referee: J Smyth

28 December 1991 23	Runcorn	1–3	Colchester United	Runcorn
15:00 GMT	Saunders 8'	Report	Bennett 15'; Cook 69'; McGavin 88'	Stadium: Canal Street; Attendance: 883; Referee: Eddie Wolstenholme

1 January 1992 24	Colchester United	1–0	Redbridge Forest	Colchester
11:30 GMT	McGavin 17'	Report		Stadium: Layer Road; Attendance: 4,773; Referee: K Bullivant

4 January 1992 25	Merthyr Tydfil	2–0	Colchester United	Merthyr Tydfil
	Coates 54'; D'Auria 83'	Report		Stadium: Penydarren Park; Attendance: 1,032; Referee: D Colwell

18 January 1992 26	Colchester United	4–0	Cheltenham Town	Colchester
15:00 GMT	McGavin 46', 86'; McDonough 75'; Kinsella 90'	Report		Stadium: Layer Road; Attendance: 2,643; Referee: A Danskin

24 January 1992 27	Kettering Town	2–2	Colchester United	Kettering
	Hill 15', 20' (pen.)	Report	McGavin 5'; Smith 11'	Stadium: Rockingham Road; Attendance: 4,100; Referee: D Shadwell

7 February 1992 28	Kidderminster Harriers	2–2	Colchester United	Kidderminster
	Davies 4'; Humphreys 25'	Report	Bennett 60'; Smith 61'	Stadium: Aggborough Stadium; Attendance: 1,828; Referee: D Mansfield

11 February 1992 29	Colchester United	1–0	Boston United	Colchester
19:30 GMT	McGavin 52'	Report	Nuttell (yellow card) 62' (red card)	Stadium: Layer Road; Attendance: 3,229; Referee: J Moore

15 February 1992 30	Welling United	4–1	Colchester United	Welling
	Robbins 5', 75'; Ransom 24'; White 89'	Report	McDonough 10' (pen.)	Stadium: Park View Road; Attendance: 1,837; Referee: I Mitchell

28 February 1992 31	Altrincham	1–2	Colchester United	Altrincham
19:30 GMT	McKenna 23'	Report	McGavin 15'; McDonough 35'	Stadium: Moss Lane; Attendance: 905; Referee: Terry Heilbron

7 March 1992 32	Colchester United	2–0	Gateshead	Colchester
15:00 GMT	Roberts 45'; Masters	Report		Stadium: Layer Road; Attendance: 2,897; Referee: D Madgewick

21 March 1992 33	Colchester United	1–0	Northwich Victoria	Colchester
15:00 GMT	Smith 83'	Report		Stadium: Layer Road; Attendance: 3,218; Referee: M Hair

24 March 1992 34	Bath City	0–0	Colchester United	Bath
		Report		Stadium: Twerton Park; Attendance: 1,101; Referee: B Priest

28 March 1992 35	Colchester United	3–0	Kidderminster Harriers	Colchester
15:00 GMT	English 42'; Benton 45' (o.g.); Stewart 90'	Report		Stadium: Layer Road; Attendance: 3,073; Referee: Paul Taylor

14 April 1992 36	Colchester United	4–0	Slough Town	Colchester
19:30 BST	McDonough 38'; Masters 83'; Stewart 87'; Kinsella 90'	Report		Stadium: Layer Road; Attendance: 3,197; Referee: J Moore

18 April 1992 37	Colchester United	2–0	Telford United	Colchester
15:00 BST	McDonough 67', 89'	Report		Stadium: Layer Road; Attendance: 3,964; Referee: C Finch

20 April 1992 38	Colchester United	2–0	Merthyr Tydfil	Colchester
	Smith 25'; Masters 64'	Report		Stadium: Layer Road; Attendance: 4,148

22 April 1992 39	Boston United	0–4	Colchester United	Boston
19:30 BST	Nuttell (red card) 50'	Report	McGavin 14'; McDonough 70', 74' (pen.); Masters 88'	Stadium: York Street; Attendance: 2,305; Referee: Alan Streets

25 April 1992 40	Macclesfield Town	4–4	Colchester United	Macclesfield
15:00 BST	Lambert 27', 62'; Doherty 47'; Edwards 49'	Report	Kendall 3' (o.g.); English 22', 76'; McDonough 60'	Stadium: Moss Rose; Attendance: 886; Referee: P Roberts

28 April 1992 41	Colchester United	3–1	Kettering Town	Colchester
19:30 BST	McDonough 27', 57'; McGavin 61'	Report	North 90'	Stadium: Layer Road; Attendance: 6,303; Referee: W Norbury

2 May 1992 42	Colchester United	5–0	Barrow	Colchester
15:00 BST	Masters 8', 15', 77'; Smith 47'; McDonough 65'	Report	Power (red card) 17'	Stadium: Layer Road; Attendance: 7,193; Referee: Graham Poll

=== Bob Lord Trophy ===
8 October 1991 2nd round	Colchester United	4–0	Kettering Town	Colchester
19:30 BST	McGavin 16'; Collins 45'; Kinsella 74', 84'	Report		Stadium: Layer Road; Attendance: 1,289

16 December 1991 3rd round	Colchester United	2–6	Wycombe Wanderers	Colchester
	Restarick 34'; McGavin 86'	Report	West 27', 51', 90'; Hutchinson 61', 65'; Creaser 76'	Stadium: Layer Road; Attendance: 919; Referee: J Moore

=== FA Cup ===
26 October 1991 4th qualifying round	Colchester United	5–0	Burton Albion	Colchester
15:00 BST	McDonough 1' (pen.); McGavin 51', 80' (pen.); Restarick 85'; Kinsella 89'	Report		Stadium: Layer Road; Attendance: 2,547; Referee: R Bigger

16 November 1991 1st round	Colchester United	0–0	Exeter City	Colchester
		Report	Williams (red card) 18'	Stadium: Layer Road; Attendance: 4,965; Referee: G Pooley

27 November 1991 1st round replay	Exeter City	0–0 (a.e.t.) (4–2 p)	Colchester United	Exeter
19:30 GMT		Report		Stadium: St James Park; Attendance: 4,066; Referee: G Pooley

=== FA Trophy ===
11 January 1992 1st round	Colchester United	2–2	Kingstonian	Colchester
15:00 GMT	Restarick 9'; English 90'	Report	Cherry 5'; Tutt 10'	Stadium: Layer Road; Attendance: 2,724; Referee: Paul Taylor

14 January 1992 1st round replay	Kingstonian	2–3	Colchester United	Kingston upon Thames
	Cherry 51' (pen.), 84' (pen.)	Report	Smith 39'; Bennett 72'; McGavin 79'	Stadium: Kingsmeadow; Attendance: 1,642; Referee: Paul Taylor

2 February 1992 2nd round	Merthyr Tydfil	0–0	Colchester United	Merthyr Tydfil
		Report		Stadium: Penydarren Park; Attendance: 1,211

4 February 1992 2nd round replay	Colchester United	1–0	Merthyr Tydfil	Colchester
19:30 GMT	McDonough 86'	Report		Stadium: Layer Road; Attendance: 2,746; Referee: Dermot Gallagher

22 February 1992 3rd round	Colchester United	3–1	Morecambe	Colchester
15:00 GMT	Stewart 12'; Collins 32'; McGavin 65'	Report	Cain 26'	Stadium: Layer Road; Attendance: 3,206; Referee: P Vanes

14 March 1992 4th round	Colchester United	4–0	Telford United	Colchester
15:00 GMT	McGavin 19'; Kinsella 50'; Bennett 53'; Smith 67'	Report		Stadium: Layer Road; Attendance: 3,894

4 April 1992 Semi-final 1st leg	Colchester United	3–0	Macclesfield Town	Colchester
15:00 BST	Stewart 23'; English 25'; McDonough 70' (pen.)	Report		Stadium: Layer Road; Attendance: 5,443; Referee: Tony Ward

10 April 1992 Semi-final 2nd leg	Macclesfield Town	1–1	Colchester United	Macclesfield
20:00 BST	Timmons 20'	Report	Cook 45'	Stadium: Moss Rose; Attendance: 1,650
Note: Colchester won 4–1 on aggregate.

10 May 1992 Final	Colchester United	3–1	Witton Albion	Wembley
15:00 BST	Masters 5'; Smith 19'; McGavin 89'; Cook (red card) 81'	Report	Lutkevich 57'	Stadium: Wembley Stadium; Attendance: 32,254

== Squad statistics ==
=== Appearances and goals ===
No.	Pos	Nat	Player	Total		Conference		FA Cup		FA Trophy		Bob Lord Trophy	
No.	Pos	Nat	Player	Apps	Goals	Apps	Goals	Apps	Goals	Apps	Goals	Apps	Goals
	GK	(England) ENG	Scott Barrett	56	1	42	1	3	0	9	0	2	0
	DF	(England) ENG	Tony English	52	8	37+1	6	3	2	9	0	2	0
	DF	(England) ENG	James Goodwin	5	0	0+3	0	1	0	0	0	1	0
	DF	(England) ENG	Martin Grainger	17	0	9+2	0	0+2	0	0+2	0	2	0
	DF	(England) ENG	Andy Partner	1	0	0	0	0	0	0	0	1	0
	DF	(Scotland) SCO	Ian Phillips	4	0	1+2	0	1	0	0	0	0	0
	DF	(England) ENG	Paul Roberts	45	1	34	1	0	0	9	0	2	0
	MF	(Republic of Ireland) IRL	Eamonn Collins	41	4	29+3	2	3	0	3+2	1	1	1
	MF	(England) ENG	Jason Cook	44	3	28+3	2	2	0	9	1	2	0
	MF	(England) ENG	Warren Donald	53	0	38+3	0	3	0	8	0	1	0
	MF	(Republic of Ireland) IRL	Wayne Hannigan	1	0	0	0	0	0	0	0	0+1	0
	MF	(Republic of Ireland) IRL	Mark Kinsella	55	7	37+5	3	3	1	8+1	1	0+1	2
	MF	(England) ENG	Nicky Smith	55	11	42	8	3	0	9	3	1	0
	FW	(England) ENG	Paul Abrahams	6	0	0+3	0	0+1	0	0	0	1+1	0
	FW	(England) ENG	Gary Bennett	51	18	31+8	16	3	0	4+4	2	1	0
	FW	(England) ENG	Julian Dart	2	0	0	0	0	0	0+2	0	0	0
	FW	(England) ENG	Roy McDonough	51	29	40	26	3	1	7	2	1	0
	FW	(England) ENG	Steve McGavin	53	28	39	20	3	2	9	4	2	2
	FW	(England) ENG	Steve Restarick	12	3	1+6	0	0+2	1	2	1	1	1
Players who appeared for Colchester who left during the season
	DF	(England) ENG	Shaun Elliott	44	1	32+5	1	2	0	5	0	0	0
	DF	(England) ENG	Simon Gray	2	0	1	0	0	0	0	0	0+1	0
	MF	(England) ENG	Dave Martin	12	0	8+1	0	0	0	3	0	0	0
	FW	(England) ENG	Sean Duffett	1	0	0	0	0	0	0	0	1	0
	FW	(United States) USA	Mike Masters	19	8	7+8	7	0	0	2+2	1	0	0
	FW	(Northern Ireland) NIR	Ian Stewart	14	4	6+4	2	0	0	3+1	2	0	0
	FW	(England) ENG	Mario Walsh	1	0	0+1	0	0	0	0	0	0	0

=== Goalscorers ===
Place	Nationality	Position	Name	Conference	FA Cup	FA Trophy	Bob Lord Trophy	Total
1	(England)	FW	Roy McDonough	26	1	2	0	29
2	(England)	FW	Steve McGavin	20	2	4	2	28
3	(England)	WG	Gary Bennett	16	2	0	0	18
4	(England)	LM	Nicky Smith	8	3	0	0	11
5	(England)	DF/MF	Tony English	6	2	0	0	8
5	(United States)	FW	Mike Masters	7	0	1	0	8
7	(England)	MF	Mark Kinsella	3	1	1	2	7
8	(Republic of Ireland)	MF	Eamonn Collins	2	0	1	1	4
8	(Northern Ireland)	WG	Ian Stewart	2	0	2	0	4
10	(England)	MF	Jason Cook	2	0	1	0	3
10	(England)	FW	Steve Restarick	0	1	1	1	3
12	(England)	GK	Scott Barrett	1	0	0	0	1
12	(England)	CB	Shaun Elliott	1	0	0	0	1
12	(England)	DF	Paul Roberts	1	0	0	0	1
			Own goals	3	0	0	0	3
			TOTALS	98	5	20	6	129

=== Disciplinary record ===
Nationality	Position	Name	Conference		FA Cup		FA Trophy		Bob Lord Trophy		Total	
Nationality	Position	Name	Booked	Sent off (straight red)	Booked	Sent off (straight red)	Booked	Sent off (straight red)	Booked	Sent off (straight red)	Booked	Sent off (straight red)
(England)	MF	Jason Cook	0	0	0	0	0	1	0	0	0	1
(England)	WG	Gary Bennett	1	0	0	0	0	0	0	0	1	0
(England)	FB	Martin Grainger	1	0	0	0	0	0	0	0	1	0
(England)	FW	Roy McDonough	0	0	0	0	1	0	0	0	1	0
(England)	FW	Steve McGavin	0	0	0	0	1	0	0	0	1	0
		TOTALS	2	0	0	0	2	1	0	0	4	1

=== Clean sheets ===
Number of games goalkeepers kept a clean sheet.

Place	Nationality	Player	Conference	FA Cup	FA Trophy	Bob Lord Trophy	Total
1	(England)	Scott Barrett	21	3	4	1	29
		TOTALS	21	3	4	1	29

=== Player debuts ===
Players making their first-team Colchester United debut in a fully competitive match.

Position	Nationality	Player	Date	Opponent	Ground	Notes
FW/WG	(England)	Paul Abrahams	26 August 1991	Slough Town	Wexham Park Stadium	
FB	(Scotland)	Ian Phillips	26 August 1991	Slough Town	Wexham Park Stadium	(Note: Second debut for the club)
DF	(England)	James Goodwin	7 September 1991	Witton Albion	Wincham Park	
DF	(England)	Simon Gray	21 September 1991	Cheltenham Town	Whaddon Road	
MF	(England)	Jason Cook	28 September 1991	Wycombe Wanderers	Adams Park	
DF	(England)	Paul Roberts	28 September 1991	Wycombe Wanderers	Adams Park	
FW	(England)	Sean Duffett	8 October 1991	Kettering Town	Layer Road	
CB	(England)	Andy Partner	16 December 1991	Wycombe Wanderers	Layer Road	
FW	(England)	Julian Dart	14 January 1992	Kingstonian	Kingsmeadow	
FW	(United States)	Mike Masters	18 January 1992	Cheltenham Town	Layer Road	
WG	(Northern Ireland)	Ian Stewart	11 February 1992	Boston United	Layer Road	
MF/CB	(England)	Dave Martin	24 March 1992	Bath City	Twerton Park	

== See also ==
- List of Colchester United F.C. seasons
