= 1992 FA Trophy final =

1992 FA Trophy Final
Vauxhall FA Trophy Final
- Event: 1991–92 FA Trophy
| Colchester United | Witton Albion |
| 3 | 1 |
- Date: 10 May 1992
- Venue: Wembley Stadium, London
- Attendance: 32,254

The 1991–92 FA Trophy Final, known as the 1992 Vauxhall FA Trophy Final for sponsorship reasons, was the final match of the 1991–92 FA Trophy. It was the 23rd season of the competition for teams from the Conference and other semi-professional teams below this level. The match was held on 10 May 1992 at Wembley Stadium, London, and was contested by Colchester United and Witton Albion. Both were appearing in the final for the first time.

Each club needed to progress through five rounds to reach the final, which included a two-legged semi-final. En route to the final, Colchester defeated Kingstonian and Merthyr Tydfil after replays, Morecambe, Telford United, and Macclesfield Town. Witton needed a replay to beat Billingham Synthonia in the first round, then saw off Aylesbury United, Stalybridge Celtic, Wycombe Wanderers, and Marine.

== Route to the final ==
=== Colchester United ===
| Round | Opposition | Score |
|---|---|---|
| 1st Replay | Kingstonian (H); Kingstonian (A) | 2–2; 3–2 |
| 2nd Replay | Merthyr Tydfil (A); Merthyr Tydfil (H) | 0–0; 1–0 |
| 3rd | Morecambe (H) | 3–1 |
| 4th | Telford United (H) | 4–0 |
| Semi-final | Macclesfield Town (H) | 3–0 |
| Semi-final | Macclesfield Town (A) | 1–1 |
Key: (H) = Home venue; (A) = Away venue; (N) = Neutral venue.

Colchester United were held to a 2–2 draw with Kingstonian in the first round of the FA Trophy at their Layer Road ground. Three goals in the opening ten minutes of the match had given Kingstonian a 2–1 lead, but a 90th-minute equaliser from Tony English sent the tie to a replay. Colchester then scraped through the replay with a 3–2 victory at Kingsmeadow. They were then held to a goalless draw at Merthyr Tydfil in the second round, but a late Roy McDonough goal secured a 1–0 win for the U's in the replay. Colchester beat Morecambe 3–1 in their third round match, before a resounding 4–0 win over Telford United in the fifth round. In the semi-final first leg, Colchester made the most of home advantage and beat Macclesfield Town 3–0, before guaranteeing a trip to Wembley with a 1–1 draw at Moss Rose to win 4–1 on aggregate.

=== Witton Albion ===
| Round | Opposition | Score |
|---|---|---|
| 1st Replay | Billingham Synthonia (H); Billingham Synthonia (A) | 2–2; 2–1 (aet) |
| 2nd | Aylesbury United (H) | 1–0 |
| 3rd | Stalybridge Celtic (H) | 1–0 |
| 4th | Wycombe Wanderers (A) | 2–1 |
| Semi-final | Marine (H) | 2–2 |
| Semi-final | Marine (A) | 4–1 |
Key: (H) = Home venue; (A) = Away venue; (N) = Neutral venue.

Witton Albion drew 2–2 with Billingham Synthonia at Wincham Park in the first round. They won 2–1 after extra time in the replay at Belasis Lane. In round two, Witton beat Aylesbury United 1–0, followed by another 1–0 victory at home to Stalybridge Celtic. In the fifth round, Witton overcame Wycombe Wanderers 2–1 at Adams Park. In the semi-final, they were held to a 2–2 draw at home by Marine, before winning 4–1 at Rossett Park to win 6–3 on aggregate.

== Pre-match ==
Prior to this match, the two sides had only met on three occasions. The first meeting had only been in March 1991, when Witton beat Colchester 2–0 at Layer Road in the 1990–91 FA Trophy. The two remaining meetings came in the 1991–92 Conference, which featured a 2–2 draw at Wincham Park, and a 3–2 win to Colchester at Layer Road.

== Match ==
The attendance for the match was 32,254 at Wembley, with an estimated 20,000 Colchester United fans in attendance. The match was also televised on Sky Sports. Colchester, who had just won promotion back to the Football League from the Conference, took the lead after five minutes when Mike Masters became the first American national professional footballer to score at Wembley. After 19 minutes, Nicky Smith doubled Colchester's lead, and the score remained 2–0 until after half-time. Witton got themselves back into the game through Mike Lutkevich on 57 minutes, before Colchester were reduced to ten men after Jason Cook was sent off ten minutes from full-time. However, Steve McGavin sealed a non-League double for Colchester in their first visit to Wembley with an 89th-minute goal to win 3–1.

Following his sending off, Jason Cook was ineligible to receive a winners medal, but unused substitute Eamonn Collins handed his medal to Cook.

=== Details ===
10 May 1992
15:00 BST

| Colchester United | 3–1 | Witton Albion |
|---|---|---|
| Masters 5'; Smith 19'; McGavin 89'; Cook (red card) 81' | Report | Lutkevich 57' |

Wembley Stadium, London
Attendance: 32,254

| GK | 1 | (England) Scott Barrett |
| FB | 2 | (England) Warren Donald |
| FB | 3 | (England) Paul Roberts |
| MF | 4 | (Republic of Ireland) Mark Kinsella |
| DF | 5 | (England) Tony English |
| CB | 6 | (England) Dave Martin |
| MF | 7 | (England) Jason Cook | (red card) 81' |
| FW | 8 | (United States) Mike Masters |
| FW | 9 | (England) Roy McDonough | Booked | (substituted off) 64' |
| FW | 10 | (England) Steve McGavin | Booked |
| MF | 11 | (England) Nicky Smith |
Substitutes:
| WG | 12 | (England) Gary Bennett | | (substituted on) 64' |
| MF | 13 | (Republic of Ireland) Eamonn Collins |
Manager:
(England) Roy McDonough

| GK | 1 | (England) Keith Mason |
| | 2 | Mike Halliday | Booked |
| | 3 | Lee Coathup | Booked |
| | 4 | Steve McNellis |
| | 5 | Jim Connor |
| | 6 | Stewart Anderson | Booked |
| | 7 | Karl Thomas |
| MF | 8 | (England) Colin Rose |
| FW | 9 | (England) Carl Alford |
| | 10 | Andy Grimshaw | Booked | (substituted off) 66' |
| | 11 | Mike Lutkevich | | (substituted off) 79' |
Substitutes:
| | 12 | Joe Connor | | (substituted on) 66' |
| | 13 | Jim McCluskie | | (substituted on) 79' |
Manager:
Peter O'Brien

Match rules

- 90 minutes.
- 30 minutes of extra time if necessary.
- Penalty shoot-out if scores still level.
- Maximum of two substitutions.
