= Scott Barrett (footballer) =

English footballer

Personal information
- Full name: Scott Barrett
- Date of birth: 2 April 1963 (age 63)
- Place of birth: Ilkeston, England
- Height: 5 ft 11 in (1.80 m)
- Position: Goalkeeper

Youth career
- Ilkeston Town

Senior career*
| Years | Team | Apps | (Gls) |
| 1983–1984 | Ilkeston Town | | |
| 1984–1987 | Wolverhampton Wanderers | 30 | (0) |
| 1987–1990 | Stoke City | 51 | (0) |
| 1990 | → Colchester United (loan) | 13 | (0) |
| 1990 | → Stockport County (loan) | 10 | (0) |
| 1990–1992 | Colchester United | 84 | (1) |
| 1992–1995 | Gillingham | 51 | (0) |
| 1995–1999 | Cambridge United | 119 | (0) |
| 1998 | → Kingstonian (loan) | 6 | (0) |
| 1999–2003 | Leyton Orient | 99 | (0) |
| 2003–2005 | Grays Athletic | 9 | (0) |
| Total | | 472 | (1) |
- * Club domestic league appearances and goals

Scott Barrett (born 2 April 1963) is an English former footballer who played as a goalkeeper in the Football League for Wolverhampton Wanderers, Stoke City, Colchester United, Stockport County, Gillingham, Cambridge United and Leyton Orient.

== Club career ==
Born in Ilkeston, Barrett began his career with hometown club Ilkeston Town but soon after joined Second Division Wolverhampton Wanderers in September 1984, just before the club was falling from the Second to the Fourth Division. He made his league debut on 27 October 1984 in a 1–0 win at Portsmouth, but was largely second choice at Molineux behind Tim Flowers and Mark Kendall, making 30 league appearances before Stoke City signed him for £10,000 in July 1987. With Stoke, Barrett was mostly seen as a second-choice keeper behind Peter Fox, making 33 appearances during the 1987–88 season. He played 20 games during 1988–89 but managed just seven appearances in 1989–90.

When former Stoke player and manager Mick Mills was appointed Colchester United's manager in January 1990, Barrett became his first-signing during an ill-fated season in which Colchester were relegated to the Conference after 40 years in the Football League. Barrett played 13 games for the U's, helping to steady the defensive performances in his three-month loan spell. With Colchester unable to match his wage demands, Barrett then went out on loan to fellow Fourth Division club Stockport County. He helped Stockport reach the play-offs and made 10 league appearances and two play-off appearances for the Hatters.

Barrett was released by Stoke during the summer of 1990 and subsequently signed to his former-loan club Colchester United. In two seasons and under two different managers, Ian Atkins and Roy McDonough, Barrett became a dependable ever-present, making 84 Conference appearances during his two years with the U's. He will be best remembered for his time at Colchester by achieving the rare feat of scoring a goal during a top-of-the-table game against promotion-rivals Wycombe Wanderers at Adams Park in September 1991, a goal which secured an 89th minute 2–1 win and later proved to crucial as Colchester topped the table at the end of the season on goal difference. He also helped grab an FA Trophy first-round equaliser against Kingstonian after venturing upfield for a late corner, nodding on the ball to assist Tony English, another important contribution as United went on to Wembley to win the trophy and complete a non-league double. With Colchester back in the Football League, the club could not meet Barrett's wage demands, and so he joined Gillingham in August 1992.

With Gillingham, Barrett made 51 league appearances between 1992 and 1995 before securing a move to Cambridge United. Here, he played 119 league games between 1995 and 1999 and had a brief loan stint with Kingstonian, making six Conference appearances in 1998. He was then signed by former Cambridge manager Tommy Taylor who was now at Leyton Orient in January 1999. In his first half-season with the club, he returned to Wembley as the O's lost out 1–0 to Scunthorpe United in the 1999 Third Division play-off final. In the semi-final against Rotherham United, he had saved two spot-kicks in the penalty shoot-out. At the end of the 2001–02 season, Barrett collected all six of the club's Player of the Year awards and would go on to become the club's goalkeeping coach. He was recalled to action during the 2002–03 season following an injury to regular goalkeeper Ashley Bayes. Barrett ended his time at Orient having made 99 league appearances in four years.

== Coaching career ==
Barrett left Leyton Orient to become assistant-manager to Mark Stimson at Grays Athletic, where he had further FA Trophy success in 2005 and 2006, before following Stimson to Stevenage Borough in the summer of 2006. The pair again succeeded in the FA Trophy, playing at the first-ever cup final at the new Wembley Stadium. Barrett once again followed Stimson to his former club Gillingham in November 2007.

With Gillingham, Barrett tasted further success when they overcame Shrewsbury Town in the 2009 Football League Two play-off final with a 1–0 victory. However, the club spent just one season in League One, relegated back to League Two after failing to win a single away fixture. When Stimson resigned in May 2010, Barrett naturally followed.

In June 2010, Stimson was named as manager of Barnet and brought in Barrett as his number-two. The management team only lasted until January 2011 after just five wins in 26 games with Stimson sacked. When Stimson was appointed manager at Kettering Town in September 2011, he announced that he would once again be teaming-up with Barrett. With the club in financial turmoil and under a transfer embargo, Stimson left the club in January 2012, taking Barrett with him to Thurrock in May 2012.

== Career statistics ==
Appearances and goals by club, season and competition
| Club | Season | League | | | FA Cup | | League Cup | | Other^{[A]} | | Total | |
| Club | Season | Division | Apps | Goals | Apps | Goals | Apps | Goals | Apps | Goals | Apps | Goals |
|---|---|---|---|---|---|---|---|---|---|---|---|---|
| Wolverhampton Wanderers | 1984–85 | Second Division | 4 | 0 | 0 | 0 | 0 | 0 | 0 | 0 | 4 | 0 |
| Wolverhampton Wanderers | 1985–86 | Third Division | 21 | 0 | 1 | 0 | 1 | 0 | 0 | 0 | 23 | 0 |
| Wolverhampton Wanderers | 1986–87 | Fourth Division | 5 | 0 | 0 | 0 | 0 | 0 | 0 | 0 | 5 | 0 |
| Wolverhampton Wanderers | Total | | 30 | 0 | 1 | 0 | 1 | 0 | 0 | 0 | 32 | 0 |
| Stoke City | 1987–88 | Second Division | 27 | 0 | 2 | 0 | 1 | 0 | 3 | 0 | 33 | 0 |
| Stoke City | 1988–89 | Second Division | 17 | 0 | 1 | 0 | 1 | 0 | 1 | 0 | 20 | 0 |
| Stoke City | 1989–90 | Second Division | 7 | 0 | 0 | 0 | 0 | 0 | 0 | 0 | 7 | 0 |
| Stoke City | Total | | 51 | 0 | 3 | 0 | 2 | 0 | 4 | 0 | 60 | 0 |
| Colchester United (loan) | 1989–90 | Fourth Division | 13 | 0 | 0 | 0 | 0 | 0 | 0 | 0 | 13 | 0 |
| Stockport County (loan) | 1989–90 | Fourth Division | 10 | 0 | 0 | 0 | 0 | 0 | 2 | 0 | 12 | 0 |
| Colchester United | 1990–91 | Conference National | 42 | 0 | 3 | 0 | – | | 6 | 0 | 51 | 0 |
| Colchester United | 1991–92 | Conference National | 42 | 1 | 3 | 0 | – | | 9 | 0 | 54 | 1 |
| Colchester United | Total | | 84 | 1 | 6 | 0 | – | | 9 | 0 | 105 | 1 |
| Gillingham | 1992–93 | Third Division | 34 | 0 | 4 | 0 | 3 | 0 | 1 | 0 | 42 | 0 |
| Gillingham | 1993–94 | Third Division | 13 | 0 | 0 | 0 | 2 | 0 | 1 | 0 | 16 | 0 |
| Gillingham | 1994–95 | Third Division | 4 | 0 | 0 | 0 | 2 | 0 | 2 | 0 | 8 | 0 |
| Gillingham | Total | | 51 | 0 | 4 | 0 | 7 | 0 | 4 | 0 | 66 | 0 |
| Cambridge United | 1995–96 | Third Division | 31 | 0 | 1 | 0 | 2 | 0 | 1 | 0 | 35 | 0 |
| Cambridge United | 1996–97 | Third Division | 45 | 0 | 2 | 0 | 2 | 0 | 1 | 0 | 50 | 0 |
| Cambridge United | 1997–98 | Third Division | 43 | 0 | 4 | 0 | 2 | 0 | 1 | 0 | 50 | 0 |
| Cambridge United | Total | | 119 | 0 | 7 | 0 | 6 | 0 | 3 | 0 | 135 | 0 |
| Leyton Orient | 1998–99 | Third Division | 20 | 0 | 0 | 0 | 0 | 0 | 3 | 0 | 23 | 0 |
| Leyton Orient | 1999–2000 | Third Division | 29 | 0 | 1 | 0 | 2 | 0 | 0 | 0 | 32 | 0 |
| Leyton Orient | 2000–01 | Third Division | 7 | 0 | 0 | 0 | 0 | 0 | 0 | 0 | 7 | 0 |
| Leyton Orient | 2001–02 | Third Division | 32 | 0 | 4 | 0 | 0 | 0 | 0 | 0 | 36 | 0 |
| Leyton Orient | 2002–03 | Third Division | 11 | 0 | 2 | 0 | 0 | 0 | 0 | 0 | 13 | 0 |
| Leyton Orient | Total | | 99 | 0 | 7 | 0 | 2 | 0 | 3 | 0 | 111 | 0 |
| Career Total | | | 457 | 1 | 28 | 0 | 18 | 0 | 25 | 0 | 534 | 1 |

A. The "Other" column constitutes appearances and goals in the Football League Trophy, Football League play-offs, Full Members' Cup, FA Trophy and Conference League Cup.

== Honours ==
=== Club ===
Colchester United

- 1990–91 Conference National runner-up (level 5)
- 1991–92 Conference National winner (level 5)
- 1991–92 FA Trophy winner

Leyton Orient

- 1998–99 Football League Third Division play-off runner-up (level 4)

=== Individual ===
- 1991 Colchester United Player of the Year
- 2002 Leyton Orient Player of the Year

All honours referenced by:
