= Paul Roberts (footballer, born 1962) =

English footballer

Personal information
- Date of birth: 27 April 1962 (age 64)
- Place of birth: West Ham, England
- Height: 5 ft 9 in (1.75 m)
- Position: Full back

Youth career
- 19xx–1978: Millwall

Senior career*
| Years | Team | Apps | (Gls) |
| 1978–1983 | Millwall | 146 | (0) |
| 1983–1985 | Brentford | 62 | (0) |
| 1985–1986 | Swindon Town | 27 | (0) |
| 1986–1987 | Southend United | 38 | (0) |
| 1987–1988 | Aldershot | 39 | (0) |
| 1988 | Leytonstone & Ilford | ? | (?) |
| 1988 | Exeter City | 3 | (0) |
| 1988–1990 | Southend United | 54 | (0) |
| 1990–1992 | Fisher Athletic | ? | (?) |
| 1992–1994 | Colchester United | 63 | (1) |
| 1994 | Chesham United | ? | (?) |
| Total | | 432 | (1) |

Managerial career
- 1994–95: Chesham United
- * Club domestic league appearances and goals

Paul Roberts (born 27 April 1962) is an English former professional footballer who played as a full back, making over 400 appearances in the Football League.

== Career ==
Born in West Ham, Roberts began his career as an apprentice at Millwall, making his senior debut in 1978. Roberts also played for Brentford, Swindon Town, Southend United, Aldershot, Leytonstone & Ilford, Exeter City, Fisher Athletic, Colchester United and Chesham United. He was player-manager of Chesham during the 1994–95 season, which saw them relegated from the Isthmian League Premier Division. He later became a London Cab driver.

== Honours ==
Millwall Youth

- FA Youth Cup: 1978–79

Millwall

- Football League Group Cup: 1982–83

Swindon Town

- Football League Fourth Division: 1985–86

Colchester United

- Football Conference: 1991–92
- FA Trophy: 1991–92

Individual

- Millwall Player of the Year: 1981
- Colchester United Player of the Year: 1993
