= Elfyn =

Elfyn is a Welsh name and may refer to:

Given name:

- Elfyn Edwards (born 1960), Welsh former professional footballer
- Elfyn Evans (born 1988), Welsh rally driver
- Elfyn Lewis (born 1969), Welsh painter and National Eisteddfod of Wales Gold Medallist
- Elfyn Llwyd (born 1951), Welsh barrister and politician
- Elfyn Richards (1914–1995), Welsh professor, aeronautical engineer and acoustical engineer

Surname:

- Beli ap Elfyn, Welsh for Beli II of Alt Clut (died 722), 8th century king of Strathclyde
- Bethan Elfyn, Welsh radio and television presenter
- Menna Elfyn FRSL FLSW (born 1952), Welsh poet, playwright, columnist writing in Welsh
