= Pamphlett =

Pamphlett is a surname. Notable people with the surname include:

- Thomas Pamphlett (1788?–1838), convict in colonial Australia
- Tony Pamphlett (born 1960), English footballer
