= Jason Cook =

Jason Cook may refer to:

- Jason Cook (actor) (born 1980), American actor
- Jason Cook (boxer) (born 1975), Welsh boxer
- Jason Cook (comedian) (born 1973/1974), English comedian
- Jason Cook (footballer) (born 1969), English former footballer
