= Julian Hazel =

English footballer & manager (born 1973)

Personal information
- Full name: Julian Hazel
- Date of birth: 25 September 1973 (age 53)
- Place of birth: Luton, England
- Position: Forward

Youth career
- –1992: Colchester United

Senior career*
Years	Team	Apps	(Gls)
1992–1993	Colchester United	2	(0)
1993–1994	Chelmsford City	3	(0)
1994–?	Braintree Town		
1991–1993	Wivenhoe Town	7	(0)
1996	Collier Row & Romford	3	(0)
1995–2002	Wivenhoe Town	220	(114)
2001	Harwich & Parkeston		
2001–2002	Stanway Rovers		
2002–2003	Heybridge Swifts		
2003–2004	Stanway Rovers		
Total		8	(0)

Managerial career
- 1998–2001: Wivenhoe Town
- * Club domestic league appearances and goals

Julian Hazel (born 25 September 1973) is an English former football player and manager who played in the Football League as a forward for Colchester United. He was manager of Wivenhoe Town.

== Career ==
Born in Luton, Hazel joined Conference club Colchester United as an apprentice, making his first-team debut in an FA Trophy first round replay 3–2 victory at Kingstonian on 14 January 1992, coming on as a substitute for Steve Restarick. He made one further appearance in the 1991–92 season, again as a substitute in the FA Trophy for Ian Stewart in a third round 3–1 home win against Morecambe.

Hazel appeared twice in the Football League following Colchester's non-league double of the Conference title and FA Trophy, playing in two games for the club, the first of which came during a 3–0 home defeat to Darlington on 29 August 1992. He made his final appearance for the U's on 1 September 1992 in a 2–0 home defeat by Shrewsbury Town.

On leaving Colchester, Hazel joined Chelmsford City and later Braintree Town. He signed for Wivenhoe Town following those spells and was appointed player-manager in the summer of 1998 becoming the youngest manager in senior football at the time, leading the club to a 17th position finish in his first season in charge, and a 6th-placed finish in his second, narrowly missing out on promotion.
