= Mike Masters (soccer) =

American soccer player (born 1967)

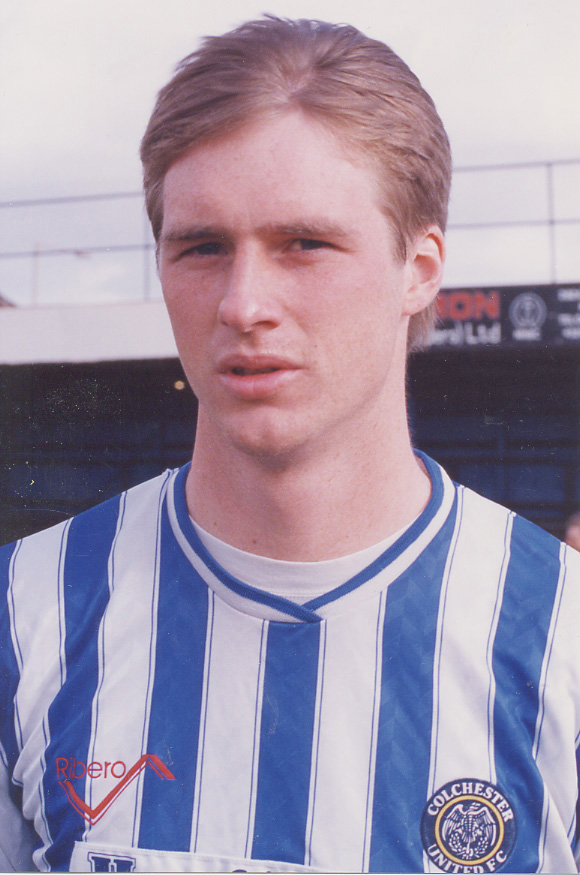

Personal information
- Full name: Michael Masters
- Date of birth: April 26, 1967 (age 59)
- Place of birth: Leesville, Louisiana, United States
- Height: 6 ft 4 in (1.93 m)
- Position: Forward

Youth career
- 1985–1988: Williams College

Senior career*
Years	Team	Apps	(Gls)
1989–1990	Albany Capitals		
1990–1991	San Francisco Bay Blackhawks	16	(4)
1990–1991	→ Colchester United (loan)	11	(1)
1991–1992	Colchester United	15	(7)
1992–?	Newbury Town		
?–1994	Boston Storm		
1994–1997	Long Island Rough Riders		

International career
1992	United States	1	(0)
- * Club domestic league appearances and goals

Michael Masters (born April 26, 1967) is an American former professional soccer player who played as a forward. He is the first American to score a goal in Wembley Stadium. He played one season in the American Soccer League, three season in its successor, the American Professional Soccer League, and the end of the 1991-1992 English season during which his team, Colchester United, won the FA Trophy final. Masters also earned one cap with the U.S. national team in 1992.

== High school and college ==
Born in Leesville, Louisiana, Masters grew up on Long Island and graduated from The Wheatley School of Old Westbury, New York in 1985. In 1991, the school inducted Masters into its Athletic Hall of Fame for his high school soccer, basketball and track and field exploits. Masters then attended Williams College, a small NCAA Division III liberal arts college in Williamstown, Massachusetts. He chose Williams for its academic-athletic balance, and also because he wanted to play both soccer and basketball.

At Williams, he played on the men's soccer team from 1985 to 1988. In 1987 and 1988 he was selected as a first team All American. He finished his four years at Williams with a school record 44 goals, a record broken in 1996 by Brad Murray. Masters also served as captain of both the soccer and basketball teams.

== Professional career ==
Following his graduation from Williams in 1989, Masters signed with the Albany Capitals of the American Soccer League (ASL). In 1990, the ASL merged with the Western Soccer League to form the American Professional Soccer League (APSL). Masters and the Capitals then played the 1990 and 1991 APSL seasons. In 1990, he was the third leading scorer in the APSL with 14 goals. In 1991, Masters scored seven goals as the Capitals went to the APSL title game only to lose to the San Francisco Bay Blackhawks. Despite this success, the Capitals folded during the off-season and Masters moved west to join the Blackhawks for the 1992 season. He played sixteen games, scoring four goals as the team finished 8-8.

At the end of the APSL season, Masters traveled to England for a trial with Colchester United which, after relegation the previous year, played in the Football Conference. Masters quickly attained cult status amongst Colchester supporters, scoring many vital goals in the club's promotion winning 1991–92 season, including a hat-trick in the final game — a 5–0 win against Barrow FC that saw the 'U's' promoted back to The Football League. A few days later, Masters headed the first goal in Colchester's 3–1 victory over Witton Albion in the FA Trophy final, sealing the so-called 'non-league' double for his side. That was the first goal scored by an American in a Wembley Stadium cup competition.

Despite Masters' productive time with Colchester, the British Home Office denied him a work permit and he returned to the United States. In 1994, the Boston Storm traded Masters to the Long Island Rough Riders during the season. He played for the Roughriders through the 1997 season.

== International career ==
On June 27, 1992, Masters earned his only cap for the United States national team, he replaced Eric Wynalda in the 59th minute of the 0–0 draw with Ukraine at Rutgers Stadium in Piscataway, New Jersey. In doing so, Masters became the first player to win a full international cap whilst playing for Colchester.

== Post-soccer ==
Following his time with the national team, Mike spent some time coaching at DePaul University. He went on to receive his MBA at DePaul, and later worked for Barclays.

== Honors ==
Colchester United

- Football Conference: 1991–92; runner-up 1990–91
- FA Trophy: 1991–92
