= Andy Partner =

English footballer

Personal information
- Full name: Andrew Neil Partner
- Date of birth: 21 October 1974 (age 52)
- Place of birth: Colchester, England
- Height: 6 ft 4 in (1.93 m)
- Position: Defender

Youth career
- Colchester United

Senior career*
Years	Team	Apps	(Gls)
1991–1997	Colchester United	2	(0)
- Heybridge Swifts
1997-1998	Wivenhoe Town	18	(1)
- Clacton Town
- Harwich & Parkeston
Total		2	(0)
- * Club domestic league appearances and goals

Andrew Neil Partner (born 21 October 1974) is an English former footballer who played in the Football League as a defender for Colchester United.

== Career ==
Born in Colchester, Partner is the son of former Colchester United trainee Neil Partner and step-son to former club chief executive Marie Partner. He joined the U's during the club's brief stint outside of the Football League, making his debut on 16 December 1991 in 6–2 home defeat by Wycombe Wanderers. The competition was not favoured by manager Roy McDonough, opting for a weakened team to fully concentrate on the league and pile more fixtures on league rivals Wycombe. Ultimately, the U's gained promotion back to the Football League at the end of the season.

Partner made two Football League appearances for Colchester, and in his final appearance during a 1–0 away defeat to Exeter City on 30 August 1994 he suffered a broken knee cap. This was the last time that he would play professional football or feature in the Colchester first-team.

Partner's injury kept him out of action for two and a half years, returning to action with the United reserves in March 1997 and featured in a number of reserve games until the end of the 1996–97 season, when he severed his ties with the club after six years. He joined Heybridge Swifts in the summer of 1997 and later had spells at Wivenhoe Town, Clacton Town and Harwich & Parkeston.
