= Dave Martin (footballer, born 1963) =

English footballer

Personal information
- Full name: David Martin
- Date of birth: 25 April 1963 (age 63)
- Place of birth: East Ham, England
- Height: 6 ft 1 in (1.85 m)
- Position: Midfielder

Youth career
- Millwall

Senior career*
Years	Team	Apps	(Gls)
1980–1984	Millwall	140	(6)
1984–1986	Wimbledon	35	(3)
1986–1993	Southend United	221	(19)
1992	→ Colchester United (loan)	12	(0)
1993–1995	Bristol City	38	(1)
1995	→ Northampton Town (loan)	7	(1)
1995–1996	Gillingham	31	(1)
1996	Leyton Orient	8	(0)
1996–1998	Northampton Town	9	(0)
1997	→ Brighton & Hove Albion (loan)	1	(0)

International career
- England youth
- * Club domestic league appearances and goals

David Martin (born 25 April 1963) is an English former footballer who played as a midfielder.

== Career ==
Martin was born on 25 April 1963 in East Ham, London and started his footballing career with Millwall in May 1980 after serving his apprenticeship with the club. After making 163 appearances and scoring 11 goals for Millwall he joined Wimbledon on 14 September 1984 for a fee of £35,000. With Wimbledon, he won promotion to the First Division in 1986 and made 35 appearances and scored three goals in the Football League before joining Southend United on 23 August 1986. His time at Southend saw him make 267 appearances and score 26 goals and secure promotion on four occasions in the 1986–87, 1989–90 and 1990–91 seasons.

He signed for Bristol City on 19 July 1993 and was loaned out to Northampton Town on 13 February 1995, where he made seven appearances and scored one goal. He finished his career at City with 45 appearances and one goal before being signed by Gillingham on 4 August 1995 by manager Tony Pulis and was subsequently named as the club captain. He finished the 1995–96 season by gaining promotion to the Second Division and left on 30 July 1996 to join Leyton Orient. He left after making 10 appearances on 11 October to join Northampton, who loaned him out to Brighton & Hove Albion on 27 March 1997 and made one appearance. He retired in May 1998 after making nine appearances for Northampton.

== Honours ==
Millwall Youth

- FA Youth Cup: 1978–79

Millwall

- Football League Group Cup: 1982–83

Southend United

- Football League Third Division runner-up: 1990–91

Colchester United

- Football Conference: 1991–92
- FA Trophy: 1991–92

Gillingham

- Football League Third Division runner-up: 1995–96
