= Tony Pamphlett =

English footballer

Personal information
- Full name: Tony John Pamphlett
- Date of birth: 13 April 1960 (age 66)
- Place of birth: Westminster, England
- Height: 6 ft 3 in (1.91 m)
- Position: Defender

Senior career*
Years	Team	Apps	(Gls)
1979–1981	Cray Wanderers		
1981–1986	Dartford (Note: The Dartford appearances and goals don't cover the 1982–83 & 1983–84 seasons.)	105	(11)
1986–1990	Maidstone United	90	(12)
1990–1992	Redbridge Forest (Note: The Redbridge Forest appearances and goals don't cover the 1990–91 season.)	37	
1992–1993	Dagenham & Redbridge	29	
- * Club domestic league appearances and goals

Tony John Pamphlett (born 13 April 1960) is an English former professional footballer, who played in The Football League for Maidstone United.

After retiring from football he worked as a carpenter for over twenty years and later became a London taxi driver. As of 2012 he resided in Welling, Greater London.

== Honours ==
Maidstone United

- Football Conference: 1988–89
