= 1991–92 FA Cup qualifying rounds =

Tournament details
- Country: England; Wales

The 1991–92 FA Cup qualifying rounds opened the 111th season of competition in England for 'The Football Association Challenge Cup' (FA Cup), the world's oldest association football single knockout competition. A total of 558 clubs were accepted for the competition, down five from the previous season's 563.

The large number of clubs entering the tournament from lower down (Levels 5 through 8) in the English football pyramid meant that the competition started with five rounds of preliminary (1) and qualifying (4) knockouts for these non-League teams. The 28 winning teams from fourth round qualifying progressed to the First round proper, where League teams tiered at Levels 3 and 4 entered the competition.

== Calendar ==
Round	Start date	New Entries	Clubs
Preliminary round	Saturday 31 August 1991	308	558 → 404
First round qualifying	Saturday 14 September 1991	134	404 → 260
Second round qualifying	Saturday 28 September 1991	none	260 → 188
Third round qualifying	Saturday 12 October 1991	none	188 → 152
Fourth round qualifying	Saturday 26 October 1991	20	152 → 124
First round proper	Friday 15 November 1991	52	124 → 84
Second round proper	Saturday 7 December 1991	none	84 → 64
Third round proper	Saturday 4 January 1992	44	64 → 32
Fourth round proper	Saturday 25 January 1992	none	32 → 16
Fifth round proper	Saturday 15 February 1992	none	16 → 8
Sixth round proper	Saturday 7 March 1992	none	8 → 4
Semi-finals	Sunday 5 April 1992	none	4 → 2
Final	Saturday 9 May 1992	none	2 → 1

== Preliminary round ==
=== Ties ===
Tie	Home team	Score	Away team
1	A F C Totton	2–2	A F C Lymington
2	Alnwick Town	4–3	Chester-Le-Street Town
3	Arlesey Town	0–1	Clapton
4	Armthorpe Welfare	1–1	Vauxhall G M
5	Arnold Town	0–2	Belper Town
6	Ashington	3–1	Crook Town
7	Ashton United	0–0	Rhyl
8	Aveley	2–0	Felixstowe Town
9	Banbury United	4–1	Stratford Town
10	Barkingside	1–1	Baldock Town
11	Barry Town	3–1	Ton Pentre
12	Barton Rovers	3–4	Bourne Town
13	Basildon United	0–1	Brimsdown Rovers
14	Beckenham Town	1–0	Wingate & Finchley
15	Bideford	2–3	Falmouth Town
16	Blackpool Rovers	3–2	Thackley
17	Boston	2–3	Harrogate Town
18	Bournemouth	1–2	Abingdon Town
19	Bracknell Town	2–2	Portfield
20	Braintree Town	2–1	Bury Town
21	Brandon United	7–1	Shotton Comrades
22	Bridgend Town	2–0	Chippenham Town
23	Bridlington Town	5–1	Evenwood Town
24	Buckingham Town	1–0	Abingdon United
25	Burnham	1–1	Feltham & Hounslow Borough
26	Burscough w/o-scr Leyland Daf-Sgl		
27	Calne Town	1–2	Westbury United
28	Canterbury City	1–0	Arundel
29	Canvey Island	0–2	Harwich & Parkeston
30	Chalfont St Peter	2–0	Flackwell Heath
31	Chard Town	1–2	Witney Town
32	Chatham Town	1–3	Steyning Town
33	Chertsey Town	2–2	Worthing
34	Cheshunt	0–3	Tilbury
35	Chichester City	1–3	Chipstead
36	Clandown	1–3	Ilfracombe Town
37	Clitheroe	4–4	Langley Park
38	Collier Row	2–2	Saffron Walden Town
39	Consett	5–0	Willington
40	Corinthian	6–0	Merstham
41	Cove	2–1	Slade Green
42	Croydon	3–0	Darenth Heathside
43	Cwmbran Town	1–0	Paulton Rovers
44	Darlington Cleveland Bridge	3–2	Horden Colliery Welfare
45	Darwen	1–1	Hebburn
46	Dawlish Town	1–2	Maesteg Park
47	Desborough Town w/o-scr Vauxhall Motors		
48	Dudley Town	1–4	Lincoln United
49	Dulwich Hamlet	2–1	Harefield United
50	Durham City	4–0	South Bank
51	East Thurrock United	1–0	Royston Town
52	Eastwood Town	2–4	Farsley Celtic
53	Edgware Town	4–0	Southall
54	Egham Town	0–1	Wembley
55	Epsom & Ewell	1–5	Walton & Hersham
56	Esh Winning	1–3	Netherfield
57	Evesham United	3–1	Rothwell Town
58	Fareham Town	1–5	Thatcham Town
59	Faversham Town	0–0	Eastbourne Town
60	Ford United	2–1	Hornchurch
61	Frome Town	3–1	Exmouth Town
62	Garforth Town	4–1	Whickham
63	Glastonbury	1–0	Keynsham Town
64	Gosport Borough	1–3	Clevedon Town
65	Grantham Town	1–5	Ilkeston Town
66	Great Harwood Town	6–0	Eccleshill United
67	Halstead Town	3–2	Hoddesdon Town
68	Hampton	3–0	Haywards Heath Town
69	Haringey Borough	5–0	Watton United
70	Harworth Colliery Institute	2–1	Maltby Miners Welfare
71	Hednesford Town	1–1	Northampton Spencer
72	Hertford Town	3–2	Northwood
73	Highgate United	0–3	Chasetown
74	Hinckley	2–4	Bridgnorth Town
75	Hinckley Town	3–1	Boldmere St Michaels
76	Hitchin Town	1–1	Tiptree United
77	Holbeach United	2–3	Hinckley Athletic
78	Horsham	2–1	Hungerford Town
79	Horsham Y M C A	1–2	Erith & Belvedere
80	Hythe Town	4–4	Croydon Athletic
81	Irlam Town	0–0	Curzon Ashton
82	Irthlingborough Diamonds	2–2	Wednesfield
83	King's Lynn	5–2	Haverhill Rovers
84	Knowsley United	5–1	Atherton Laburnum Rovers
85	Lancaster City	1–5	Winsford United
86	Lancing	4–1	Wick
87	Langney Sports	0–1	Southwick
88	Leatherhead	3–1	Corinthian Casuals
89	Leighton Town	3–2	Kingsbury Town
90	Letchworth Garden City	1–1	Potton United
91	Lewes	4–3	Three Bridges
92	Leyton Wingate	6–0	Eynesbury Rovers
93	Liversedge	3–1	Maine Road
94	Malvern Town	3–2	Halesowen Harriers
95	March Town United	1–1	Histon
96	Melksham Town	1–1	Welton Rovers
97	Metropolitan Police	2–4	Hastings Town
98	Mirrlees Blackstone	2–1	Great Yarmouth Town
99	Molesey	4–0	Ringmer
100	Newbury Town	1–0	Horndean
101	Newcastle Town	2–0	Ossett Albion
102	Newmarket Town	1–1	Biggleswade Town
103	Newtown	4–2	Glossop
104	Oakwood	0–3	Havant Town
105	Oldbury United	1–2	Blakenall
106	Ossett Town	2–0	North Ferriby United
107	Penrith	1–0	Ferryhill Athletic
108	Prescot	3–2	Chadderton
109	Prudhoe East End	0–2	Bedlington Terriers
110	Purfleet	3–1	Gorleston
111	Racing Club Warwick	2–1	Rushall Olympic
112	Radcliffe Borough	0–1	Nantwich Town
113	Radstock Town	0–2	Devizes Town
114	Rainham Town	0–1	Lowestoft Town
115	Rocester	1–3	Oakham United
116	Rossendale United	2–4	Heanor Town
117	Rushden Town	3–2	Friar Lane Old Boys
118	Salford City	0–0	Warrington Town
119	Sandwell Borough	1–2	Alfreton Town
120	Seaham Red Star	3–2	Peterlee Newtown
121	Selsey	2–1	Malden Vale
122	Sheffield	2–0	Congleton Town
123	Sholing Sports	0–6	Maidenhead United
124	Shoreham	0–3	Sheppey United
125	Shortwood United	3–0	Weston Super Mare
126	Solihull Borough	1–0	Spalding United
127	Spennymoor United	1–0	Easington Colliery
128	St Blazey	0–3	Minehead
129	St Helens Town	1–3	Borrowash Victoria
130	Stamford	2–1	Paget Rangers
131	Stockton	2–4	Billingham Town
132	Stourbridge	1–0	Long Buckby
133	Sudbury Town	2–2	Barking
134	Tamworth	2–2	Lye Town
135	Thame United	1–1	Eastleigh
136	Tooting & Mitcham United	2–0	Redhill
137	Torrington	3–1	Barnstaple Town
138	Tring Town	0–3	Hemel Hempstead
139	Tunbridge Wells	0–2	Burgess Hill Town
140	Walsall Wood	1–1	Raunds Town
141	Waltham Abbey	0–1	Stevenage Borough
142	Walthamstow Pennant	3–2	Langford
143	Ware	5–1	Milton Keynes Borough
144	Washington	1–3	Shildon
145	West Auckland Town	3–5	Denaby United
146	Whitstable Town	0–1	Eastbourne United
147	Whyteleafe	2–0	Ashford Town (Kent)
148	Willenhall Town	6–1	Wellingborough Town
149	Wisbech Town	4–3	Burnham Ramblers
150	Witham Town	3–1	Welwyn Garden City
151	Wolverton	1–0	Uxbridge
152	Worksop Town	3–1	Brigg Town
153	Yate Town	4–1	Bristol Manor Farm
154	Yeading	8–0	Rayners Lane

=== Replays ===
Tie	Home team	Score	Away team
1	A F C Lymington	3–2	A F C Totton
4	Vauxhall G M	1–2	Armthorpe Welfare
7	Rhyl	1–0	Ashton United
10	Baldock Town	5–0	Barkingside
19	Portfield	2–1	Bracknell Town
25	Feltham & Hounslow Borough	0–4	Burnham
33	Worthing	4–1	Chertsey Town
37	Langley Park	1–1	Clitheroe
38	Saffron Walden Town	2–3	Collier Row
45	Hebburn	2–1	Darwen
59	Eastbourne Town	0–4	Faversham Town
71	Northampton Spencer	1–1	Hednesford Town
76	Tiptree United	1–0	Hitchin Town
80	Croydon Athletic	2–1	Hythe Town
81	Curzon Ashton	4–1	Irlam Town
82	Wednesfield	3–3	Irthlingborough Diamonds
90	Potton United	2–0	Letchworth Garden City
95	Histon	2–1	March Town United
96	Welton Rovers	1–2	Melksham Town
102	Biggleswade Town	2–2	Newmarket Town
118	Warrington Town	1–0	Salford City
133	Barking	2–2	Sudbury Town
134	Lye Town	1–3	Tamworth
135	Eastleigh	0–2	Thame United
140	Raunds Town	3–1	Walsall Wood

=== 2nd replays ===
Tie	Home team	Score	Away team
37	Langley Park	1–0	Clitheroe
82	Hednesford Town	1–0	Northampton Spencer
71	Irthlingborough Diamonds	0–2	Wednesfield
133	Biggleswade Town	1–0	Newmarket Town
102	Sudbury Town	2–1	Barking

== 1st qualifying round ==
=== Ties ===
Tie	Home team	Score	Away team
1	A F C Lymington	2–4	Bashley
2	A P V Peterborough City	0–0	Alvechurch
3	Alfreton Town	1–0	Hinckley Athletic
4	Alnwick Town	1–1	Brandon United
5	Annfield Plain	0–4	North Shields
6	Ashington	0–4	Consett
7	Aveley	0–2	Heybridge Swifts
8	Banbury United	2–1	Hednesford Town
9	Banstead Athletic	1–2	Wokingham Town
10	Bedworth United	0–2	Bromsgrove Rovers
11	Berkhamsted Town	3–2	Harrow Borough
12	Biggleswade Town	1–2	Brimsdown Rovers
13	Bishop's Stortford	1–1	Mirrlees Blackstone
14	Blakenall	1–2	Boston United
15	Bootle	2–1	Newcastle Town
16	Borrowash Victoria	2–0	Belper Town
17	Bourne Town	0–3	Braintree Town
18	Bridgend Town	3–3	Cheltenham Town
19	Bridgnorth Town	1–2	Matlock Town
20	Bridlington Town	3–2	Blyth Spartans
21	Brockenhurst	1–2	Dorchester Town
22	Buxton	4–2	Burscough
23	Caernarfon Town	1–1	Colwyn Bay
24	Camberley Town	1–3	Marlow
25	Chalfont St Peter	0–4	Nuneaton Borough
26	Chasetown	0–0	Bilston Town
27	Chesham United	2–0	Wolverton
28	Clacton Town	1–2	Billericay Town
29	Clapton	1–5	Chelmsford City
30	Cleator Moor Celtic	0–7	Gretna
31	Clevedon Town	2–2	Witney Town
32	Corby Town	1–0	Hemel Hempstead
33	Corinthian	1–3	Erith & Belvedere
34	Cove	1–1	Burgess Hill Town
35	Curzon Ashton	1–1	Bangor City
36	Darlington Cleveland Bridge	1–3	Murton
37	Dartford	5–1	Ware
38	Denaby United	1–0	Harrogate Railway Athletic
39	Desborough Town	2–4	Rushden Town
40	Dover Athletic	6–0	Chipstead
41	Dulwich Hamlet	1–0	Burnham
42	Dunston Federation Brewery	1–0	Guisborough Town
43	Durham City	1–0	Tow Law Town
44	East Thurrock United	1–1	Grays Athletic
45	Eastbourne United	1–4	Lewes
46	Eastwood Hanley	2–1	Northwich Victoria
47	Enfield	4–0	Walthamstow Pennant
48	Evesham United	2–4	Malvern Town
49	Falmouth Town	2–0	Minehead
50	Farsley Celtic	0–1	Emley
51	Faversham Town	3–2	Carshalton Athletic
52	Fisher Athletic	4–0	Beckenham Town
53	Fleetwood Town	3–2	Blackpool Rovers
54	Flixton	1–1	Mossley
55	Ford United	3–1	Wivenhoe Town
56	Glastonbury	0–4	Trowbridge Town
57	Gloucester City	4–1	Shortwood United
58	Goole Town	0–1	Oakham United
59	Gravesend & Northfleet	2–1	Canterbury City
60	Hailsham Town	1–1	Sheppey United
61	Halstead Town	2–3	Baldock Town
62	Harlow Town	4–1	Leyton Wingate
63	Harrogate Town	2–2	Frickley Athletic
64	Harwich & Parkeston	2–1	Potton United
65	Harworth Colliery Institute	0–1	Droylsden
66	Heanor Town	0–2	Armthorpe Welfare
67	Herne Bay	0–2	Kingstonian
68	Hertford Town	2–0	Staines Town
69	Hinckley Town	2–0	Leicester United
70	Horsham	1–0	Buckingham Town
71	Horwich R M I	1–0	Ilkeston Town
72	King's Lynn	3–3	Cambridge City
73	Knowsley United	2–0	Sheffield
74	Lancing	1–3	Hampton
75	Leatherhead	1–2	Dorking
76	Lincoln United	3–1	Gainsborough Trinity
77	Lowestoft Town	2–1	Boreham Wood
78	Maesteg Park	4–0	Frome Town
79	Mangotsfield United	4–2	Cwmbran Town
80	Marine	4–0	Liversedge
81	Melksham Town	1–8	Worcester City
82	Molesey	1–5	Crawley Town
83	Moor Green	0–3	Tamworth
84	Morecambe	1–0	Great Harwood Town
85	Netherfield	3–2	Billingham Synthonia
86	Newcastle Blue Star	5–1	Hebburn
87	Newport I O W	0–3	Maidenhead United
88	Northallerton Town	1–0	Langley Park
89	Norton & Stockton Ancients	0–4	Guiseley
90	Ossett Town	0–1	Southport
91	Pagham	1–3	Basingstoke Town
92	Peacehaven & Telscombe	2–1	Hastings Town
93	Penrith	4–2	Billingham Town
94	Poole Town	3–1	Westbury United
95	Portfield	1–2	Havant Town
96	Prescot	0–5	Accrington Stanley
97	Purfleet	2–2	Collier Row
98	Raunds Town	1–1	Gresley Rovers
99	Redbridge Forest	5–0	Haringey Borough
100	Redditch United	5–1	Edgware Town
101	Rhyl	1–0	Newtown
102	Romsey Town	2–1	Newbury Town
103	Saltash United	6–0	Ilfracombe Town
104	Seaham Red Star	3–0	Shildon (Seaham used ineligible player, replay ordered)
105	Selsey	2–1	Andover
106	Shepshed Albion	2–0	Stourbridge
107	Skelmersdale United	0–4	Macclesfield Town
108	Slough Town	2–2	Croydon
109	Solihull Borough	3–0	Wednesfield
110	Southwick	1–3	Sittingbourne
111	Spennymoor United	0–1	Bedlington Terriers
112	St Austell	2–3	Liskeard Athletic
113	Stalybridge Celtic	4–0	Worksop Town
114	Stevenage Borough	0–2	Sutton Coldfield Town
115	Steyning Town	0–1	Bognor Regis Town
116	Stowmarket Town	1–4	Hendon
117	Stroud	1–3	Bath City
118	Sudbury Town	1–0	Histon
119	Swanage Town & Herston	1–1	Waterlooville
120	Taunton Town	2–0	Devizes Town
121	Thame United	2–0	Abingdon Town
122	Thatcham Town	1–1	Salisbury
123	Thetford Town	0–2	St Albans City
124	Tilbury	1–1	Leighton Town
125	Tiptree United	1–0	Dagenham
126	Tonbridge	2–1	Croydon Athletic
127	Tooting & Mitcham United	2–1	Margate
128	Torrington	2–2	Tiverton Town
129	V S Rugby	2–0	Stamford
130	Walton & Hersham	1–1	Littlehampton Town
131	Warrington Town	1–0	Hyde United
132	Wembley	1–2	Windsor & Eton
133	West Midlands Police	0–1	Burton Albion
134	Whitby Town	0–1	Garforth Town
135	Whitehawk	0–2	Bromley
136	Whyteleafe	1–2	Worthing
137	Willenhall Town	2–1	Racing Club Warwick
138	Wimborne Town	1–2	Weymouth
139	Winsford United	3–0	Nantwich Town
140	Wisbech Town	0–3	Kettering Town
141	Witham Town	1–3	Wealdstone
142	Workington	0–1	Gateshead
143	Yate Town	0–3	Barry Town
144	Yeading	3–1	Ruislip Manor

=== Replays ===
Tie	Home team	Score	Away team
2	Alvechurch	3–2	A P V Peterborough City
4	Brandon United	0–1	Alnwick Town
13	Mirrlees Blackstone	2–0	Bishop's Stortford
18	Cheltenham Town	5–0	Bridgend Town
23	Colwyn Bay	2–1	Caernarfon Town
26	Bilston Town	0–1	Chasetown
31	Witney Town	1–0	Clevedon Town
34	Burgess Hill Town	4–0	Cove
35	Bangor City	1–2	Curzon Ashton
44	Grays Athletic	2–1	East Thurrock United
54	Mossley	2–1	Flixton
60	Sheppey United	4–1	Hailsham Town
63	Frickley Athletic	3–3	Harrogate Town
72	Cambridge City	1–2	King's Lynn
97	Collier Row	0–1	Purfleet
98	Gresley Rovers	2–0	Raunds Town
108	Shildon	2–1	Seaham Red Star
119	Croydon	0–3	Slough Town
122	Waterlooville	2–0	Swanage Town & Herston
124	Salisbury	3–0	Thatcham Town
125	Leighton Town	1–0	Tilbury
128	Tiverton Town	3–2	Torrington
130	Littlehampton Town	2–1	Walton & Hersham

=== 2nd replay ===
Tie	Home team	Score	Away team
63	Frickley Athletic	3–2	Harrogate Town

== 2nd qualifying round ==
=== Ties ===
Tie	Home team	Score	Away team
1	Accrington Stanley	2–2	Knowsley United
2	Alvechurch	3–0	Malvern Town
3	Bashley	1–1	Maidenhead United
4	Basingstoke Town	1–1	Horsham
5	Bath City	5–2	Maesteg Park
6	Berkhamsted Town	2–0	Leighton Town
7	Billericay Town	3–1	Sudbury Town
8	Bognor Regis Town	1–2	Burgess Hill Town
9	Boston United	1–1	Tamworth
10	Bridlington Town	4–0	Northallerton Town
11	Bromley	3–1	Worthing
12	Bromsgrove Rovers	1–0	Rushden Town
13	Burton Albion	4–1	Willenhall Town
14	Chasetown	1–1	Banbury United
15	Chelmsford City	1–1	Enfield
16	Cheltenham Town	8–0	Taunton Town
17	Colwyn Bay	2–0	Rhyl
18	Crawley Town	2–0	Sheppey United
19	Curzon Ashton	1–0	Buxton
20	Denaby United	1–0	Fleetwood Town
21	Dorchester Town	3–2	Witney Town
22	Dorking	3–4	Gravesend & Northfleet
23	Droylsden	1–1	Bootle
24	Dunston Federation Brewery	2–2	Penrith
25	Durham City	1–4	Morecambe
26	Eastwood Hanley	3–2	Armthorpe Welfare
27	Emley	4–2	Horwich R M I
28	Faversham Town	0–0	Dover Athletic
29	Ford United	0–1	Dartford
30	Frickley Athletic	4–1	Alfreton Town
31	Gateshead	6–0	Alnwick Town
32	Grays Athletic	3–1	Redbridge Forest
33	Gresley Rovers	3–3	V S Rugby
34	Gretna	3–1	Bedlington Terriers
35	Guiseley	5–1	Shildon
36	Hendon	1–2	Baldock Town
37	Hertford Town	3–1	Dulwich Hamlet
38	Heybridge Swifts	1–1	Mirrlees Blackstone
39	Hinckley Town	3–3	Shepshed Albion
40	Kettering Town	3–1	Braintree Town
41	King's Lynn	4–2	Purfleet
42	Kingstonian	3–2	Lewes
43	Lincoln United	2–0	Oakham United
44	Liskeard Athletic	5–1	Falmouth Town
45	Littlehampton Town	1–3	Hampton
46	Lowestoft Town	1–0	Harwich & Parkeston
47	Macclesfield Town	1–2	Borrowash Victoria
48	Marlow	2–1	Havant Town
49	Matlock Town	2–1	Solihull Borough
50	Mossley	1–1	Winsford United
51	Murton	3–1	Garforth Town
52	Netherfield	2–1	Newcastle Blue Star
53	North Shields	3–1	Consett
54	Nuneaton Borough	2–2	Corby Town
55	Salisbury	2–0	Poole Town
56	Selsey	1–6	Romsey Town
57	Sittingbourne	1–2	Tonbridge
58	Southport	1–2	Stalybridge Celtic
59	St Albans City	1–1	Brimsdown Rovers
60	Sutton Coldfield Town	1–3	Redditch United
61	Tiptree United	0–6	Harlow Town
62	Tiverton Town	0–0	Saltash United
63	Tooting & Mitcham United	2–0	Peacehaven & Telscombe
64	Trowbridge Town	3–0	Mangotsfield United
65	Warrington Town	0–0	Marine
66	Waterlooville	3–3	Thame United
67	Wealdstone	2–4	Chesham United
68	Weymouth	1–1	Barry Town
69	Windsor & Eton	3–2	Fisher Athletic
70	Wokingham Town	1–2	Erith & Belvedere
71	Worcester City	2–1	Gloucester City
72	Yeading	0–1	Slough Town

=== Replays ===
Tie	Home team	Score	Away team
1	Knowsley United	2–1	Accrington Stanley
3	Maidenhead United	1–0	Bashley
4	Horsham	2–1	Basingstoke Town
9	Tamworth	1–0	Boston United
14	Banbury United	1–2	Chasetown
15	Enfield	2–1	Chelmsford City
23	Bootle	1–3	Droylsden
24	Penrith	6–6	Dunston Federation Brewery
28	Dover Athletic	2–1	Faversham Town
33	V S Rugby	3–0	Gresley Rovers
38	Mirrlees Blackstone	0–1	Heybridge Swifts
39	Shepshed Albion	3–2	Hinckley Town
50	Winsford United	6–0	Mossley
54	Corby Town	1–0	Nuneaton Borough
59	Brimsdown Rovers	2–0	St Albans City
62	Saltash United	1–2	Tiverton Town
65	Marine	1–0	Warrington Town
66	Thame United	3–2	Waterlooville
68	Barry Town	2–3	Weymouth

=== 2nd replays ===
Tie	Home team	Score	Away team
24	Penrith	2–1	Dunston Federation Brewery

== 3rd qualifying round ==
=== Ties ===
Tie	Home team	Score	Away team
1	Alvechurch	2–0	Corby Town
2	Baldock Town	2–2	Dartford
3	Bath City	1–2	Worcester City
4	Berkhamsted Town	1–4	Slough Town
5	Billericay Town	1–3	Enfield
6	Borrowash Victoria	0–3	Emley
7	Brimsdown Rovers	2–2	Chesham United
8	Bromley	0–3	Dover Athletic
9	Bromsgrove Rovers	2–0	Redditch United
10	Burgess Hill Town	0–1	Gravesend & Northfleet
11	Burton Albion	3–2	Shepshed Albion
12	Chasetown	0–0	V S Rugby
13	Colwyn Bay	4–3	Marine
14	Dorchester Town	1–0	Trowbridge Town
15	Eastwood Hanley	1–2	Stalybridge Celtic
16	Erith & Belvedere	1–2	Crawley Town
17	Frickley Athletic	0–0	Lincoln United
18	Gateshead	0–0	Netherfield
19	Gretna	3–0	Murton
20	Guiseley	1–1	Denaby United
21	Hampton	2–2	Tonbridge
22	Hertford Town	1–2	Windsor & Eton
23	Horsham	1–1	Maidenhead United
24	Kettering Town	3–0	Heybridge Swifts
25	King's Lynn	2–3	Harlow Town
26	Kingstonian	0–0	Tooting & Mitcham United
27	Knowsley United	2–0	Curzon Ashton
28	Liskeard Athletic	1–3	Tiverton Town
29	Lowestoft Town	1–2	Grays Athletic
30	Marlow	2–0	Romsey Town
31	Matlock Town	0–2	Tamworth
32	North Shields	0–2	Bridlington Town
33	Penrith	0–3	Morecambe
34	Thame United	0–4	Salisbury
35	Weymouth	4–0	Cheltenham Town
36	Winsford United	3–2	Droylsden

=== Replays ===
Tie	Home team	Score	Away team
2	Dartford	1–2	Baldock Town
7	Chesham United	2–1	Brimsdown Rovers
12	V S Rugby	3–0	Chasetown
17	Lincoln United	3–2	Frickley Athletic
18	Netherfield	0–3	Gateshead
20	Denaby United	1–2	Guiseley
21	Tonbridge	3–0	Hampton
23	Maidenhead United	0–1	Horsham
26	Tooting & Mitcham United	2–3	Kingstonian

== 4th qualifying round ==
The teams that given byes to this round are Colchester United, Altrincham, Telford United, Runcorn, Merthyr Tydfil, Barrow, Welling United, Yeovil Town, Stafford Rangers, Farnborough Town, Witton Albion, Leek Town, Sutton United, Aylesbury United, Halesowen Town, Hayes, Bishop Auckland, Whitley Bay, Atherstone United and Chorley.

=== Ties ===
Tie	Home team	Score	Away team
1	Aylesbury United	1–1	Chesham United
2	Baldock Town	1–1	Halesowen Town
3	Barrow	0–1	Bridlington Town
4	Chorley	2–2	Emley
5	Colchester United	5–0	Burton Albion
6	Colwyn Bay	0–2	Morecambe
7	Enfield	2–1	V S Rugby
8	Gravesend & Northfleet	1–1	Harlow Town
9	Grays Athletic	0–2	Atherstone United
10	Gretna	3–2	Stalybridge Celtic
11	Guiseley	2–1	Bishop Auckland
12	Hayes	1–0	Dorchester Town
13	Horsham	0–0	Crawley Town
14	Kettering Town	0–0	Stafford Rangers
15	Leek Town	0–2	Lincoln United
16	Merthyr Tydfil	1–1	Windsor & Eton
17	Runcorn	1–0	Gateshead
18	Salisbury	1–7	Farnborough Town
19	Slough Town	2–1	Kingstonian
20	Tamworth	0–1	Bromsgrove Rovers
21	Telford United	1–0	Knowsley United
22	Tiverton Town	1–0	Dover Athletic
23	Tonbridge	1–2	Yeovil Town
24	Welling United	5–1	Alvechurch
25	Weymouth	1–1	Sutton United
26	Whitley Bay	1–4	Witton Albion
27	Winsford United	3–2	Altrincham
28	Worcester City	1–2	Marlow

=== Replays ===
Tie	Home team	Score	Away team
1	Chesham United	1–3	Aylesbury United
2	Halesowen Town	1–0	Baldock Town
4	Emley	1–1	Chorley (Abandoned at 90 minutes)
8	Harlow Town	1–0	Gravesend & Northfleet
13	Crawley Town	3–0	Horsham
14	Stafford Rangers	0–2	Kettering Town
16	Windsor & Eton	1–0	Merthyr Tydfil
25	Sutton United	3–0	Weymouth

=== 2nd replay ===
Tie	Home team	Score	Away team
4	Chorley	0–1	Emley

== 1991–92 FA Cup ==
See 1991-92 FA Cup for details of the rounds from the first round proper onwards.
