= Steve McGavin =

English footballer (born 1969)

Personal information
- Full name: Steven James McGavin
- Date of birth: 24 January 1969 (age 57)
- Place of birth: North Walsham, England
- Height: 5 ft 8 in (1.73 m)
- Position: Striker

Senior career*
| Years | Team | Apps | (Gls) |
- Sudbury Town
| 1992–1994 | Colchester United | 58 | (17) |
| 1994–1995 | Birmingham City | 23 | (2) |
| 1995–1999 | Wycombe Wanderers | 123 | (15) |
| 1999 | Southend United | 11 | (0) |
| 1999 | Northampton Town | 0 | (0) |
| 1999–2001 | Colchester United | 75 | (18) |
| 2001–2002 | Dagenham & Redbridge | 32 | (6) |
| 2002–2003 | Harwich & Parkeston | | |
| 2003–2004 | Stanway Rovers | | |
| 2004 | Clacton Town | | |
| 2004–2006 | Bury Town | 34 | (10) |

Managerial career
- 2002–2003: Harwich & Parkeston
- * Club domestic league appearances and goals

Steven James McGavin (born 24 January 1969) is an English former professional footballer. He now works as head of national recruitment for Aston Villa Academy. Having previously held recruitment roles at both Norwich City and Ipswich Town.

== Playing career ==
Born in North Walsham, McGavin played non-League football for Sudbury Town in his late teens and early 20s, before being signed by Colchester United for £10,000 in July 1992. After scoring 17 goals in 58 games, he was signed by Birmingham City for £150,000 in January 1994. However, after 23 matches and only two goals, he was sold to Wycombe Wanderers for £175,000 in March 1995.

In January 1999 he was released by Wycombe, and in February signed for Southend United on a free transfer, but failed to score in eleven appearances. He signed for Northampton Town in August that year, but did not make a first team appearance. In October he returned to Colchester, where he made 75 appearances over two seasons.

After being released by Colchester in July 2001, he returned to non-League football and signed for Dagenham & Redbridge. He later moved on to Harwich & Parkeston (where he was player-manager), Stanway Rovers, Clacton Town, and Bury Town. McGavin also played amateur football for Real Benalmadena in Andalucia, Spain.

== Coaching career ==
McGavin was briefly player-manager of Harwich & Parkeston in the 2002–03 season. After retirement, McGavin worked within Colchester United's commercial department. Additionally, he shortly coached at youth level: training the U12s at Marbella Paraiso CF.

In August 2012, McGavin was appointed head of academy recruitment at Ipswich Town. He joined Norwich City in 2017, and later Aston Villa in similar roles.

== Personal life ==
McGavin's youngest son, Brett McGavin, is also a footballer.

== Honours ==
Colchester United

- Football Conference: 1991–92
- FA Trophy: 1991–92

Birmingham City

- Football League Second Division: 1994–95

Individual

- Non-League Player of the Year: 1991–92
