= Jason Cook (footballer) =

English footballer (born 1969)

Personal information
- Full name: Jason Peter Cook
- Date of birth: 29 December 1969 (age 56)
- Place of birth: Edmonton, London, England
- Position: Midfielder

Youth career
- Tottenham Hotspur

Senior career*
Years	Team	Apps	(Gls)
1989–1991	Southend United	30	(1)
1991–1993	Colchester United	66	(3)
- Dagenham & Redbridge
1996–1997	Chelmsford City	12	(0)
- Braintree Town
- * Club domestic league appearances and goals

Jason Peter Cook (born 29 December 1969) is an English former footballer who played in the Football League as a midfielder for Southend United and Colchester United.

== Career ==
Cook, born in Edmonton, London, was on the books at Tottenham Hotspur as a youth, but failed to progress to the first-team. In June 1989, he joined Southend United, spending two years with the Shrimpers and making 30 appearances, scoring one goal.

In July 1991, Cook joined Conference side and Essex rivals Colchester United. He made 31 appearances in a season where the U's were promoted back to the Football League at the second time of asking, scoring two goals. On 28 September 1991, he made his Colchester debut in a famous 2–1 away victory against rivals Wycombe Wanderers, a game where Colchester's goalkeeper Scott Barrett scored an 89th-minute winner from a long upfield punt. Cook had come on as a 69th-minute substitute for Mark Kinsella. He scored his first goal in a 3–1 home victory over Welling United on 23 November Colchester also reached the FA Trophy final, a match which they won 3–1 over Witton Albion. Cook was sent off in the match, and in turn was unable to collect a winners medal. However, unused substitute in the game Eamonn Collins handed Cook his winners medal. With Colchester back in the Football League, Cook made a further 35 appearances and scored one goal before moving on to Dagenham & Redbridge in 1993. He also played for Chelmsford City and Braintree Town.

== Honours ==
Colchester United

- 1991–92 Football Conference winner (Level 5)
- 1991–92 FA Trophy winner

All honours referenced by:
