= Tony English =

English footballer (born 1966)

Personal information
- Full name: Anthony Karl English
- Date of birth: 19 October 1966 (age 60)
- Place of birth: Luton, England
- Height: 6 ft 1 in (1.85 m)
- Position: Defender

Youth career
- Coventry City

Senior career*
Years	Team	Apps	(Gls)
1984–1996	Colchester United	351	(42)
- Sudbury Town
- Heybridge Swifts
- Witham Town
- Harwich & Parkeston
- Halstead Town

International career
1984	England U17	4	(0)
1984	England Youth	5	(0)
- * Club domestic league appearances and goals

Anthony Karl English (born 19 October 1966) is an English former professional footballer who played as a defender for Colchester United in the Football League.

== Career ==
Born in Luton, as a junior he played for Coventry City before joining the Colchester United youth setup and then progressing to a professional contract with the club. English played 351 league games and 45 cup games in defence for Colchester United between 1984 and 1996, captaining the side to a Conference and FA Trophy double. At the end of the 2006–07 season, he was inducted into the Colchester United Hall of Fame as one of the first five inductees, with a special ceremony held on the Layer Road pitch at the last game of the season against Crystal Palace.

== Honours ==
Colchester United

- Football Conference winner: 1991–92
- Football Conference runner-up: 1990–91
- FA Trophy winner: 1991–92
