= Eamonn Collins =

Irish footballer & manager (born 1965)

Personal information
- Full name: Eamonn Anthony Stephen Collins
- Date of birth: 22 October 1965 (age 61)
- Place of birth: Inchicore, Dublin, Ireland
- Height: 5 ft 6 in (1.68 m)
- Position: Midfielder

Youth career
- 1980–1981: Blackpool
- 1981–1983: Southampton

Senior career*
Years	Team	Apps	(Gls)
1983–1986	Southampton	3	(0)
1986–1989	Portsmouth	5	(0)
1987–1988	→ Exeter City (loan)	9	(0)
1988	→ Gillingham (loan)	0	(0)
1989–1992	Colchester United	106	(6)
1992–1993	Exeter City	11	(0)
1992–1993	→ Farnborough Town (loan)		
1993–1994	Crediton United		
1994–1996	Elmore		

International career
1985–1987	Republic of Ireland U21	5	(0)

Managerial career
- –1996: Elmore
- 2003–2004: St Patrick's Athletic
- * Club domestic league appearances and goals

Eamonn Anthony Stephen Collins (born 22 October 1965) is an Irish retired footballer and football manager, who is now a players' agent. In his playing career, he was the youngest player ever to turn out in a professional game in England, when he played for Blackpool in 1980, six weeks before his 15th birthday. For much of his career, he played for teams where his mentor at Blackpool, the former England player, Alan Ball, was either manager or player. He also played for the Republic of Ireland at the 1984 UEFA European Under-18 Championship and the 1985 FIFA World Youth Championship.

== Playing career ==
=== Blackpool ===
Collins was born at Inchicore, Dublin, close to Richmond Park, the home of St Patrick's Athletic.

He signed apprenticeship forms with Blackpool in April 1980 and became a member of the club's youth team, playing in the under-18 league. According to Collins, on Saturday, 6 September 1980, he had played against the Manchester United youth team and scored twice. On the following Tuesday, 9 September, Collins was called into the squad to play at Bloomfield Road in an Anglo-Scottish Cup quarter-final first-leg tie against Kilmarnock. In a later interview, Collins recalled the events leading up to the match:

"That Monday I was just back to my normal jobs, getting all the coaches' kit ready, cleaning the players' boots. From eight till ten, I did all my jobs. After that I was going out to train with the youth team and some of the reserves. Then the first team coach, Ted MacDougall, came over to me and said, 'Eamonn, you're training with the first team today'. I honestly thought it was a wind-up. They were playing a lot of practical jokes on me at the time, with me having just arrived over from Ireland at 14. Doing a lot of silly stuff. So I just kept on walking over towards the youth team. Then Alan Ball shouted across, 'Come over Eamonn, you're training with us'. Only then did I realise it was serious."

In the match, Collins came on as a second-half substitute for Dave Hockaday and, at the age of 14 years and 323 days, became the youngest player to have appeared in a professional match in England. The match itself was won 2–1, with Kilmarnock winning the second leg 4–2, to go through to the next round on aggregate. Collins was surpassed as the UK's youngest ever footballer in September 2022 by 13-year-old Christopher Atherton of Glenavon, Northern Ireland, though Collins retains the record in England.

Collins only made the one appearance for Blackpool, and in December 1981, he moved to Southampton, where Alan Ball was now playing.

=== Southampton ===
Collins spent his first three years at Southampton playing either for the Youth team or for the reserves, and did not make his first-team debut until 29 September 1984, when he played in a 1–1 draw with Queens Park Rangers.

He continued to play regularly for the reserves, but being short (5 ft 6 in – 1.68 m) and lightweight (8 st 3 lb – 52.2 kg), he lacked the muscle to force himself into the first team. He made two further substitute appearances in the Football League in the 1984–85 season, as well as two appearances in League Cup matches, with his final appearance coming against Arsenal at Highbury on 19 November 1985.

Whilst with the Saints, Collins was called up to join the Republic of Ireland squad for the 1985 FIFA World Youth Championship held in the Soviet Union from August to September 1985. The Irish lost all three Round One matches, finishing bottom of their group.

=== Portsmouth ===
In May 1986, Collins moved to Portsmouth where Alan Ball was now manager. He made five league and four cup appearances during Portsmouth's 1986–87 promotion campaign before being loaned out, firstly to Exeter City in November 1987, where he made nine league appearances, and then to Gillingham in November 1988, where he made one appearance in the Football League Trophy.

=== Colchester United ===
Collins left Portsmouth in April 1989, moving on to Colchester United to be re-united with Alan Ball, who was then the assistant to Jock Wallace. Although Ball left Colchester in October 1989, Collins remained with the Layer Road club for three years, during which they were relegated to the Conference in 1990, before taking the Conference title, as well as winning the FA Trophy in 1992.

=== Exeter City ===
In July 1992, Collins was once again re-united with Ball when he returned to Exeter City. After eleven league appearances (plus four in various cup competitions), and a loan spell with Farnborough Town, Collins left Exeter in the summer of 1993 and dropped down to Non-League football.

=== Non-league football ===
Collins returned to Devon where he spent the early part of the 1993–94 season with Crediton United, before moving to join Elmore in February 1994. He remained with the Tiverton based club until December 1996. He subsequently returned to his native Ireland to live.

During his playing career he also played in Denmark and Norway.

== Coaching and managerial career ==
In 1999, he joined his home-town club St Patrick's Athletic as assistant manager to Pat Dolan, succeeding him as manager in February 2003, signing a two-year contract with the Richmond Park outfit.

It was the dream job for Collins, the son of a former St. Patrick's chairman and brother of two former players.

However, despite a League of Ireland Cup win and an FAI Cup final appearance, after just over a year in charge, Collins quit St Patrick's in May 2004 with the club second from bottom in the League of Ireland Premier Division. On his departure, chairman Andy O'Callaghan expressed his hope that Collins would change his mind, saying; "We've left the door open for Eamonn to come back. People are talking to him and praying he will change his mind."

In the event, Collins joined rivals Shelbourne as assistant to Pat Fenlon on 31 May 2004. Collins left Shelbourne following Fenlon's resignation in December 2006.

Soon after leaving Shelbourne, Collins was established as a player's agent. and is now on FIFA's list of registered agents. Amongst his clients is his nephew Nathan Collins and Keith Fahey, who was transferred from St Patrick's to Birmingham City in January 2009.

His son Joe and nephew Michael both played for the U17 Republic of Ireland national football team.

== Allegations of inappropriate behaviour ==
In July 2024, Collins was publicly alleged to have made sexual advances to women players while a coach.

He was arrested on 25 July 2026 as part of a Garda National Protective Services Bureau investigation into allegations of historical sexual abuse involving a national sporting organisation in the 1990s.

== Honours ==
Colchester United

- Conference National: 1991-92
- FA Trophy: 1992

St. Patrick's Athletic

- League of Ireland Cup: 2003
