= Steve Restarick =

English footballer (born 1971)

Personal information
- Full name: Stephen Leonard James Restarick
- Date of birth: 28 November 1971 (age 54)
- Place of birth: Barking, London, England
- Height: 5 ft 10 in (1.78 m)
- Position: Forward

Youth career
- Queens Park Rangers
- West Ham United
- 1988–1990: Colchester United

Senior career*
Years	Team	Apps	(Gls)
1990–1992	Colchester United	15	(5)
1990	→ Bury Town (loan)		
1991	→ Fisher Athletic (loan)	11	(1)
1992	→ Wivenhoe Town (loan)	17	(11)
1992–1995	Chelmsford City	150	(63)
1995–1996	Dover Athletic	26	(4)
1996–1998	Crawley Town	59	(29)
1998–1999	Dulwich Hamlet		
2001	Welling United		
1999–2001	Gravesend & Northfleet		
2001–2002	Crawley Town		
2002	Dartford		
2002	→ Hastings Town (loan)		
2002	Folkestone Invicta		
2002–2003	Maidstone United		
2003	Chatham Town		
Total		269	(104)
- * Club domestic league appearances and goals

Stephen Leonard James "Steve" Restarick (born 28 November 1971) is an English former footballer who played in the Football League as a forward for Colchester United alongside a long career in English non-league football.

== Career ==
Born in Barking, London, as a schoolboy, Restarick was on the books of London-based clubs Queens Park Rangers and West Ham United before moving to Colchester United to begin his apprenticeship in 1988. During his 2nd season, he netted 33 goals, including four goals in one game on his 18th birthday. Towards the end of his apprenticeship, Restarick made his Football League debut, coming on as a substitute for Richard Wilkins during a 1–0 defeat to Peterborough United on 7 April 1990 as Colchester edged closer to relegation to the Conference.

Despite Colchester's relegation, Restarick was signed on a professional contract, loaned to Bury Town during Autumn 1990, he featured in an experimental side in the Bob Lord Trophy against Fisher Athletic on 21 January 1991, scoring two in extra-time, his first senior goals for the club, as the U's went on to record a 3–2 victory. Later in March 1991, he joined Fisher on loan alongside fellow youth-team product John Pollard, scoring once in 11 games.

During Colchester's Conference and FA Trophy double-winning season, Restarick contributed first-team goals in three different cup competitions but found first-team opportunities hard to come by, failing to register a league goal. He was loaned to local club Wivenhoe Town for a chunk of the 1991–92 season, finishing as Town's leading scorer with 11 goals in 17 games.

As Colchester were promoted back to the Football League, Restarick was released, joining Chelmsford City where he scored 63 goals in 150 games for the club. This earned him a five-figure fee move to Conference side Dover Athletic, where he scored four goals in 26 Conference games. He later played for Crawley Town, Dulwich Hamlet, Welling United, Gravesend & Northfleet and a second spell with Crawley. He then moved to Dartford, turning out on loan at Hastings United before a signing for Folkestone Invicta. He was made player-coach at Maidstone United and then made appearances for Chatham Town before returning to Dulwich Hamlet where he retired at the end of the 2022-23 season.
