= Elfyn Edwards =

Welsh footballer and manager

Personal information
- Full name: James Elfyn Edwards
- Date of birth: 4 May 1960 (age 66)
- Place of birth: Aberystwyth, Wales
- Position: Defender

Senior career*
Years	Team	Apps	(Gls)
1977–1979	Wrexham	0	(0)
1979–1981	Tranmere Rovers	62	(1)
- Runcorn
- Altrincham
- Bangor City
1986–1993	Macclesfield Town	259	(23)
- Halifax Town
- Southport
- Winsford United
- Warrington Town

Managerial career
- 2014–2015: Walsall (academy-coach)
- 2015–2019: Tamworth (academy-coach)
- * Club domestic league appearances and goals as of 24 June 2019

James Elfyn Edwards (born 4 May 1960) is a Welsh former professional footballer, who was most recently an academy coach National League side Tamworth, during his playing career he played as a central defender in the Football League for Tranmere Rovers.

== Playing career ==
=== Tranmere Rovers ===
Edwards began his career at Tranmere Rovers.

== Coaching career ==
=== Tamworth ===
Since his retirement from playing, Edwards moved to Sutton Coldfield, and is now coaching the academy at Tamworth, mainly coaching the U10's and U12's.
