= Nicky Smith (English footballer) =

English footballer (1969–2026)

Personal information
- Full name: Nicholas Leslie Smith
- Date of birth: 28 January 1969
- Place of birth: Berkeley, England
- Date of death: 12 April 2026 (aged 57)
- Place of death: Chelmsford, England
- Position: Midfielder

Youth career
- Southend United

Senior career*
Years	Team	Apps	(Gls)
1986–1990	Southend United	60	(6)
1990–1994	Colchester United	157	(12)
1994	Northampton Town	6	(1)
1994–1997	Sudbury Town	154	
1997	Cambridge City		
1997–2002	Braintree Town	164	(19)
2002–2005	Maldon Town		
2005–2006	Witham Town		
2006–2011	A.F.C. Sudbury	48	(15)

International career
- England national police team

Managerial career
- 2008–2011: AFC Sudbury
- 2011–?: England national police team
- 2012: Saffron Walden Town (Joint)
- * Club domestic league appearances and goals

Nicholas Leslie Smith (28 January 1969 – 12 April 2026) was an English professional footballer. After his professional career ended, he played for several non-League teams whilst serving as a policeman and captained, coached and managed the England police team, as well as managing AFC Sudbury.

== Career ==
Born in Berkeley, Gloucestershire, Smith started his career at Southend United in the mid-1980s, before moving to Colchester United in 1990. He was in the team that won the FA Trophy and promotion to the Football League in 1992. He signed for Northampton Town in 1994, but made only six appearances before dropping into non-League with Sudbury Town in 1995, where he played alongside several other ex-Colchester players in a team that reached the first round of the FA Cup for the first time in the club's history.

After leaving Sudbury, he played for several non-League clubs in East Anglia, including Cambridge City, Braintree Town, Maldon Town and Witham Town, before returning to Sudbury in 2006. In 2007, he became player-assistant manager, and on 17 May 2008 he was appointed manager of AFC Sudbury following the departure of Mark Morsley. He resigned from the position in September 2011. In 2012, he was appointed joint manager of Saffron Walden Town, but resigned later the same year.

== Death ==
Smith died of cancer on 12 April 2026, aged 57.

== Honours ==
Colchester United

- Football Conference: 1991–92
- FA Trophy: 1991–92
