= Redbridge Forest F.C. =

Redbridge Forest
- Full name: Redbridge Forest Football Club
- Founded: 1979; 46 years ago (as Leytonstone/Ilford)
- Dissolved: 1992 (merged with Dagenham)
- Ground: Victoria Road, Dagenham
- 1991–92: Conference National, 7th
Home colours	Away colours

Redbridge Forest Football Club was an English football club, founded in 1979 as Leytonstone & Ilford F.C., which in 1989 merged with Walthamstow Avenue and the following season adopted the name Redbridge Forest. In 1992 the club merged with Dagenham to form the present Dagenham & Redbridge.

== History ==
Leytonstone/Ilford F.C. was founded in 1979 by a merger of Leytonstone F.C. (founded in 1886) and Ilford F.C. (founded in 1881).

Leytonstone & Ilford logo

They were somewhat successful in non-league football, while under the name Leytonstone & Ilford, they were crowned Isthmian League champions during 1981–82. The following season the club finished as runners-up in the same league. At the end of the season, they changed their name to Leytonstone/Ilford F.C..

Another merger was incorporated in 1988 when Walthamstow Avenue were incorporated. Initially there was no name change, and the club won the Isthmian League that season; they were due to be promoted to the Football Conference, but were denied due to ground problems, as the Green Pond Road ground at Walthamstow had already been sold to developers so was not worth upgrading. The club moved to Victoria Road, home of Dagenham F.C., but found the same problem as their ground too was now not up to Conference standard. Leytonstone & Ilford remained in the Isthmian League Premier Division.

=== Under the Redbridge Forest name ===
For the 1989 season, the name of the club was changed to Redbridge Forest, in preparation for a move to a new site bordering both Redbridge and Waltham Forest borders. However, the move to a new site collapsed and the club remained at Victoria Road. Incidentally, Dagenham and Redbridge Forest were both in the Isthmian League Premier Division for that season and the two matches between landlord and tenant saw 2–2 and 1–1 draws between the clubs, clubs that now play as one. Redbridge Forest won the Isthmian League in 1990–91 and with the ground now passing Conference regulations, the club were now allowed to move up to the Conference for the 1991–92 season.

Redbridge Forest were in the Conference for one year and achieved a seventh-place finish during the 1991–92 season. For the 1992–93 season, they merged with Dagenham (the club whose ground they were sharing) and became Dagenham & Redbridge. The new club reached the English Football League at the end of the 2006–07 as Conference National champions, and won promotion to League One in 2010 via play-offs.

== Colours ==
The club's colours were red shirts and blue shorts with white trim, the red taken from the Leytonstone colours and the blue from Ilford. The colours did not change after the merger with Walthamstow Avenue, whose colours were light and dark blue.

== Honours ==
As Leytonstone/Ilford F.C

- Isthmian League
  - Champions: 1981–82, 1988–89
  - Runners-up: 1982–83
- Isthmian League Division One
  - Champions: 1979–80, 1986–87

As Redbridge Forest F.C

- Isthmian League
  - Champions: 1990–91
- FA Trophy
  - Quarter-finalists: 1991–92
