= Gary Bennett (footballer, born 1970) =

English footballer

Personal information
- Date of birth: 13 November 1970 (age 55)
- Place of birth: Enfield, England
- Position: Striker

Youth career
- Tottenham Hotspur

Senior career*
Years	Team	Apps	(Gls)
1988–1993	Colchester United	130	(38)
1993	Braintree Town		
1993	Brentford	0	(0)
1993–1994	Woking	3	(1)
1994–1996	Dagenham & Redbridge	15	(5)
–1999	Braintree Town		
1999–2000	AFC Sudbury		
2000–2001	Chelmsford City	57	(27)
2001–2005	AFC Sudbury		
2005–2006	Witham Town		
2006–2007	Ipswich Wanderers		
2007	Tiptree United	1	(0)
- * Club domestic league appearances and goals

Gary Bennett (born 13 November 1970) is an English former professional footballer. A prolific striker, he holds goalscoring records at two of his former clubs.

== Career ==
Born in Enfield, Bennett was in the youth system at Tottenham Hotspur, but began his senior career at Colchester United, for whom he played in the FA Trophy final in 1992. In 1994, he left Colchester to join Woking, and during the 1990s also played for Dagenham & Redbridge and Braintree Town, for whom he scored a record 57 goals in one season. In the 2000s he had two spells with A.F.C. Sudbury, playing 253 games and scoring 172 goals, and remains the club's all-time top scorer. He also played for Chelmsford City (who paid £3,000 to sign him from Sudbury in 2000), Witham Town, Ipswich Wanderers (where he was player/assistant manager) and Tiptree United. After playing a solitary match for Tiptree, Bennett stopped playing football and works as a postman.

== Honours ==
=== Club ===
Colchester United

- Football Conference Winner (1): 1991–92
- Football Conference Runner-up (1): 1990–91
- FA Trophy Winner (1): 1991–92
