= Roy McDonough =

English football player and manager (born 1958)

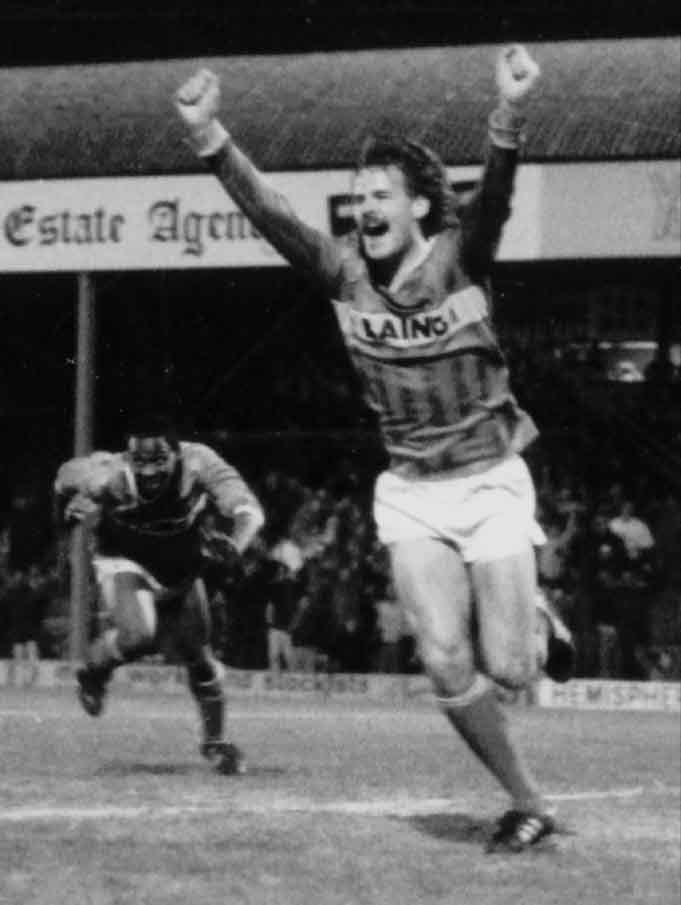

Personal information
- Date of birth: 16 October 1958 (age 68)
- Place of birth: Solihull, England
- Height: 6 ft 1 in (1.85 m)
- Position: Forward

Youth career
- Aston Villa
- 1975–1976: Birmingham City

Senior career*
| Years | Team | Apps | (Gls) |
| 1976–1978 | Birmingham City | 2 | (1) |
| 1978–1980 | Walsall | 82 | (15) |
| 1980–1981 | Chelsea | 0 | (0) |
| 1981–1983 | Colchester United | 93 | (24) |
| 1983–1984 | Southend United | 22 | (4) |
| 1984 | Exeter City | 20 | (1) |
| 1984–1985 | Cambridge United | 32 | (5) |
| 1985–1990 | Southend United | 186 | (30) |
| 1990–1994 | Colchester United | 127 | (50) |
| 1996 | Chelmsford City | 3 | (0) |
| Total | | 567 | (130) |

Managerial career
- 1991–1994: Colchester United
- 1996: Chelmsford City
- 1998: Heybridge Swifts
- * Club domestic league appearances and goals

Roy McDonough (born 16 October 1958) is an English former professional football player and manager in the English Football League.

== Playing career ==
Roy McDonough was born in Solihull, he was one of four brothers and a twin to Gaz McDonough. He came from a sporting family, and had an uncle Fred Harris, who captained Birmingham City. His father, James, played for Bath City and owned a dress shop. His mother, Iris, ran a boutique. McDonough signed schoolboy forms with Aston Villa, along with his twin, after becoming top-scorer for the Birmingham schools and Warwickshire county school teams. However, in March 1975, at the age of 16, he was handed a six-month suspension from competitive football for throttling a referee in the final of the Birmingham Schools Cup. He was not offered professional terms by manager Ron Saunders.

He used his family connections to win a trial at First Division club Birmingham City, and was signed to an 18-month apprenticeship after he scored four goals in two trial games. He went on to sign professional forms with the club, and made his debut in the Football League in a 1–0 defeat to Sunderland at Roker Park on 7 May 1977.

He went on to Colchester to make some 88 appearances, scoring 24 goals in his first spell at Layer Road before moving to local rivals Southend United in 1983. In 22 appearances for the "Shrimpers" between 1984 and 1985 he scored 4 times.

Between 1985 and 1986 McDonough moved first to Exeter City (21 appearances, 1 goal) and then Cambridge United (32 appearances, 5 goals) before returning to Roots Hall and Southend. In his second spell at Southend, he became to some fans a cult hero. In around 186 appearances he scored 30 times, however certain sections of the crowd were not always enamoured with his playing style.

In September 1990 he returned to Colchester United, who had been relegated to the Football Conference, as a player. In his second season, he top scored with 29 goals in a Conference and FA Trophy Double-winning campaign as player-manager, before making another 63 Football League appearances and scoring 16 times. He was sacked as manager in 1994 and joined Dagenham & Redbridge, moving on to Chelmsford City, where he made three league appearances, amongst others.

== Managerial career ==
Roy took the managerial position at Colchester United for the 1991–92 season, following Ian Atkins' departure in the Summer of 1991 and achieved legendary status at the North Essex club by guiding them to a Football Conference and FA Trophy 'double', promoting them back into the full Football League.

During his period in charge, McDonough stoked the bitter rivalry with Martin O'Neill's Wycombe Wanderers that had developed during both clubs' time in non-league's 'top flight', culminating in the dramatic promotion season of 1991–92 when Colchester advanced into Division Four on the last day via a superior goal difference. While Wycombe and Colchester played out a mini-league of their own (both clubs finished some 21 points ahead of their nearest rivals) Big Roy had on occasions taunted the Wycombe players and staff and antagonised them by un-sportsmanlike tactics.

Commenting on an incident where Colchester United hooligans attacked home supporters during a Conference championship deciding match in 1992 at Adams Park, he was quoted as saying, "It takes two to fight, one to punch, the other to stand there and be punched."

Arguably it was his confrontational style, carried over from his playing days, that ultimately saw him leave Colchester and move through the non-league ranks with Dagenham & Redbridge, Chelmsford City, Canvey Island, Heybridge Swifts, Bishop's Stortford, Braintree Town and Harwich and Parkeston amongst others.

== Style of play ==
A tall, imposing forward (though he played as an orthodox centre-half on a number of occasions) he had a reputation as one of football's "hard men" and rarely shied away from the physical aspects of the game. As a result, he is the record holder for the most dismissals in a career, 22, and for red cards in the Football League, 13, an unenviable mark that he holds jointly with Steve Walsh.

== Later life ==
In August 2012 he published his autobiography, Red Card Roy, which was ghost-written by Bernie Friend.

== Career statistics ==
Appearances and goals by club, season and competition
| Club | Season | League | | | FA Cup | | Other | | Total | |
| Club | Season | Division | Apps | Goals | Apps | Goals | Apps | Goals | Apps | Goals |
|---|---|---|---|---|---|---|---|---|---|---|
| Birmingham City | 1976–77 | First Division | 2 | 1 | 0 | 0 | 0 | 0 | 2 | 1 |
| Walsall | 1978–79 | Third Division | 34 | 7 | 1 | 0 | 0 | 0 | 35 | 7 |
| Walsall | 1979–80 | Fourth Division | 42 | 7 | 4 | 0 | 2 | 0 | 48 | 7 |
| Walsall | 1980–81 | Third Division | 6 | 1 | 0 | 0 | 2 | 1 | 8 | 2 |
| Walsall | Total | | 82 | 15 | 5 | 0 | 4 | 1 | 91 | 16 |
| Chelsea | 1980–81 | Second Division | 0 | 0 | 0 | 0 | 0 | 0 | 0 | 0 |
| Colchester United | 1980–81 | Third Division | 12 | 2 | 0 | 0 | 0 | 0 | 12 | 2 |
| Colchester United | 1981–82 | Fourth Division | 40 | 14 | 5 | 0 | 5 | 2 | 50 | 16 |
| Colchester United | 1982–83 | Fourth Division | 41 | 8 | 1 | 0 | 7 | 0 | 49 | 8 |
| Colchester United | Total | | 93 | 24 | 6 | 0 | 12 | 2 | 111 | 26 |
| Southend United | 1983–84 | Third Division | 22 | 4 | 2 | 0 | 2 | 0 | 26 | 4 |
| Exeter City | 1983–84 | Third Division | 16 | 0 | 0 | 0 | 3 | 0 | 19 | 0 |
| Exeter City | 1984–85 | Fourth Division | 4 | 1 | 0 | 0 | 2 | 0 | 6 | 1 |
| Exeter City | Total | | 20 | 1 | 0 | 0 | 5 | 0 | 25 | 1 |
| Cambridge United | 1984–85 | Third Division | 32 | 5 | 3 | 1 | 1 | 0 | 36 | 6 |
| Southend United | 1985–86 | Fourth Division | 38 | 7 | 1 | 0 | 4 | 0 | 43 | 7 |
| Southend United | 1986–87 | Fourth Division | 33 | 4 | 3 | 3 | 2 | 0 | 38 | 7 |
| Southend United | 1987–88 | Third Division | 42 | 9 | 3 | 0 | 8 | 2 | 53 | 11 |
| Southend United | 1988–89 | Third Division | 40 | 5 | 0 | 0 | 6 | 0 | 46 | 5 |
| Southend United | 1989–90 | Fourth Division | 33 | 5 | 1 | 0 | 5 | 0 | 39 | 5 |
| Southend United | Total | | 186 | 30 | 8 | 3 | 25 | 2 | 219 | 35 |
| Colchester United | 1990–91 | Conference | 24 | 8 | 0 | 0 | 5 | 1 | 29 | 9 |
| Colchester United | 1991–92 | Conference | 40 | 26 | 0 | 0 | 11 | 3 | 51 | 29 |
| Colchester United | 1992–93 | Third Division | 25 | 9 | 3 | 0 | 3 | 0 | 31 | 9 |
| Colchester United | 1993–94 | Third Division | 38 | 7 | 1 | 0 | 6 | 2 | 45 | 9 |
| Colchester United | Total | | 127 | 50 | 4 | 0 | 25 | 6 | 156 | 56 |
| Career total | | | 564 | 130 | 23 | 3 | 74 | 11 | 661 | 144 |

=== Managerial statistics ===
| Team | From | To | Record | | | | |
| Team | From | To | P | W | D | L | Win % |
|---|---|---|---|---|---|---|---|
| Colchester United | 1 August 1991 | 15 May 1994 | 155 | 69 | 33 | 53 | 44.5 |

== Honours ==
Walsall

- Football League Fourth Division runner-up: 1979–80

Southend United

- Football League Fourth Division third-place promotion: 1986–87, 1989–90

Colchester United

- Football Conference runner-up: 1990–91
- Football Conference champion: 1991–92
- FA Trophy winner: 1992
- Colchester United F.C. Hall of Fame (inducted 2012)
