= 1991–92 Football Conference =

Thirteenth season of the Football Conference

Football Conference
- Season: 1991–92
- Champions: Colchester United (2nd Football Conference title)
- Promoted to the Football League: Colchester United
- Conference League Cup winners: Wycombe Wanderers
- FA Trophy winners: Colchester United
- Relegated to Level 6: Barrow, Cheltenham Town
- Matches: 462
- Goals: 1,343 (2.91 per match)
- Top goalscorer: Paul Cavell (Redbridge Forest), 29; Terry Robbins (Welling United), 29
- Biggest home win: Witton Albion – Stafford Rangers 6–0 (8 February 1992)
- Biggest away win: Cheltenham Town – Redbridge Forest 0–7 (29 February 1992)
- Highest scoring: Altrincham – Slough Town 3–7 (19 October 1991)
- Longest winning run: Redbridge Forest, 7 matches; Wycombe Wanderers, 7 matches (twice)
- Longest unbeaten run: Colchester United, 15 matches
- Longest losing run: Altrincham, 9 matches
- Highest attendance: Colchester United v Barrow, 7,193 (2 May 1992)
- Lowest attendance: ?
- Average attendance: 1,221 (– 14% compared to previous season)

The Football Conference season of 1991–92 (referred to as the GM Vauxhall Conference for sponsorship reasons) was the thirteenth season of the Football Conference.

== Overview ==
Colchester United, relegated from the Fourth Division two years earlier, regained their Football League status by winning the Conference title. However, as had happened a year earlier, there was no relegation from the Football League to the Conference due to an expansion of the Football League – which was ultimately never completed due to the bankruptcy of Aldershot late in the 1991–92 season and then Maidstone United (1897) at the start of the 1992–93 season.

== New teams in the league this season ==
- Farnborough Town (promoted 1990–91)
- Redbridge Forest (promoted 1990–91)
- Witton Albion (promoted 1990–91)

== Final league table ==
Pos	Team	Pld	W	D	L	GF	GA	GD	Pts	Promotion or relegation
1	Colchester United (C, P)	42	28	10	4	98	40	+58	94	Promotion to the Football League Third Division
2	Wycombe Wanderers	42	30	4	8	84	35	+49	94	
3	Kettering Town	42	20	13	9	72	50	+22	73	
4	Merthyr Tydfil	42	18	14	10	59	56	+3	68	
5	Farnborough Town	42	18	12	12	68	53	+15	66	
6	Telford United	42	19	7	16	62	66	−4	64	
7	Redbridge Forest	42	18	9	15	69	56	+13	63	Merged into Dagenham & Redbridge (Note: At the end of the season, Redbridge Forest merged with Dagenham of the Isthmian League Premier Division to form Dagenham & Redbridge, with the new club taking Redbridge Forest's place in the Football Conference.)
8	Boston United	42	18	9	15	71	66	+5	63	
9	Bath City	42	16	12	14	54	51	+3	60	
10	Witton Albion	42	16	10	16	63	60	+3	58	
11	Northwich Victoria	42	16	6	20	63	58	+5	54	
12	Welling United	42	14	12	16	69	79	−10	54	
13	Macclesfield Town	42	13	13	16	50	50	0	52	
14	Gateshead	42	12	12	18	49	57	−8	48	
15	Yeovil Town	42	11	14	17	40	49	−9	47	
16	Runcorn	42	11	13	18	50	63	−13	46	
17	Stafford Rangers	42	10	16	16	41	59	−18	46	
18	Altrincham	42	11	12	19	61	82	−21	45	
19	Kidderminster Harriers	42	12	9	21	56	77	−21	45	
20	Slough Town	42	13	6	23	56	82	−26	45	
21	Cheltenham Town (R)	42	10	13	19	56	82	−26	43	Relegation to the Southern League Premier Division
22	Barrow (R)	42	8	14	20	52	72	−20	38	Relegation to the Northern Premier League Premier Division

(C) Champions; (P) Promoted; (R) Relegated

== Results ==
Home \ Away	ALT	BRW	BAT	BOS	CHL	COL	FAR	GAT	KET	KID	MAC	MER	NOR	RED	RUN	SLO	STA	TEL	WEL	WTN	WYC	YEO
Altrincham		1–1	4–0	2–4	2–1	1–2	1–1	1–1	1–1	1–1	3–1	1–1	0–1	0–3	2–2	3–7	3–0	2–3	1–2	2–2	0–4	2–1
Barrow	0–2		2–0	2–2	0–0	1–1	0–1	1–1	0–0	5–1	2–0	2–2	0–2	0–1	2–3	3–4	0–0	3–0	6–1	0–1	0–1	0–0
Bath City	3–2	2–1		2–0	5–1	0–0	1–2	0–1	1–1	0–1	1–1	0–0	2–0	0–0	3–1	2–1	0–1	1–2	3–2	0–2	1–1	3–1
Boston United	2–1	4–1	1–0		3–3	0–4	0–1	4–0	1–1	1–1	1–5	2–0	0–2	2–1	2–1	3–1	2–2	1–2	5–1	3–2	2–2	1–3
Cheltenham Town	0–2	0–0	1–2	1–1		1–1	4–3	3–2	0–3	1–2	2–3	1–2	1–0	0–7	4–1	1–0	0–0	2–1	3–2	0–1	2–1	1–1
Colchester United	3–3	5–0	5–0	1–0	4–0		2–3	2–0	3–1	3–0	2–0	2–0	1–0	1–0	2–1	4–0	2–0	2–0	3–1	3–1	3–0	4–0
Farnborough Town	3–0	5–0	1–2	5–0	1–1	0–2		3–1	1–3	2–1	4–2	0–0	2–4	1–0	0–2	2–1	1–1	2–2	1–1	1–1	1–3	0–0
Gateshead	5–0	1–1	0–1	2–1	2–1	0–2	0–2		0–0	0–3	2–0	0–1	2–0	0–1	1–1	2–1	0–0	0–2	1–1	2–1	2–3	1–0
Kettering Town	5–0	3–2	2–2	1–3	3–0	2–2	1–2	1–1		2–1	2–0	3–1	1–0	3–2	3–0	2–3	2–1	3–0	1–1	1–1	1–1	2–0
Kidderminster Harriers	1–0	1–2	0–1	1–3	2–1	2–2	1–1	5–3	2–3		1–1	2–2	1–0	5–1	2–1	3–3	2–1	1–2	1–3	0–1	1–0	1–1
Macclesfield Town	1–1	0–1	0–0	0–1	3–3	4–4	1–2	1–0	0–2	0–0		3–0	0–0	0–0	3–0	0–1	1–0	2–1	1–2	1–0	3–1	1–2
Merthyr Tydfil	3–1	2–1	1–1	2–0	3–1	2–0	1–0	1–4	4–1	2–1	3–2		2–1	2–2	2–0	1–2	1–0	2–2	2–1	1–0	1–2	2–2
Northwich Victoria	1–2	6–1	1–3	1–1	3–1	1–1	1–1	1–1	4–3	3–1	2–1	4–1		0–2	3–0	3–0	1–2	0–1	1–2	3–0	0–1	1–0
Redbridge Forest	0–1	2–2	3–1	1–4	1–2	2–1	2–0	2–1	4–0	5–0	0–0	1–1	4–3		1–2	4–0	4–3	1–0	2–0	3–1	0–5	0–0
Runcorn	2–2	2–2	0–2	2–2	2–1	1–3	1–1	1–1	0–0	4–1	0–0	1–1	3–1	1–0		1–0	0–0	0–2	2–2	0–1	1–2	2–2
Slough Town	2–3	1–0	2–2	3–1	1–3	2–4	0–5	2–0	0–2	3–1	0–3	0–0	0–1	4–0	1–0		2–2	0–3	0–3	2–1	0–1	1–4
Stafford Rangers	1–2	0–0	2–0	0–1	2–2	3–3	0–1	1–3	1–2	2–0	1–1	0–0	2–1	3–0	1–0	1–1		3–2	0–0	2–1	0–2	0–0
Telford United	2–1	4–2	0–2	1–2	2–1	0–3	1–2	1–1	1–1	3–1	0–1	1–2	1–4	3–3	2–1	2–2	4–1		2–1	2–1	1–1	1–0
Welling United	2–2	5–3	0–5	1–3	1–1	4–1	1–0	2–2	2–3	3–2	2–1	1–2	6–1	2–2	1–2	0–2	1–1	3–1		1–1	1–3	1–0
Witton Albion	2–0	0–1	2–2	1–0	4–2	2–2	4–1	0–3	1–0	2–1	1–1	3–2	1–1	2–0	1–3	2–1	6–0	1–1	2–2		1–2	3–1
Wycombe Wanderers	4–2	3–2	1–0	2–1	2–2	1–2	2–1	2–1	1–0	2–0	0–1	4–0	2–0	1–0	1–0	3–0	3–0	6–1	4–0	4–0		1–0
Yeovil Town	2–1	2–0	1–1	1–1	1–1	0–1	2–2	1–0	0–1	1–1	0–1	1–1	2–1	0–1	1–4	1–0	0–1	0–2	3–0	2–1	1–0	

Updated to match(es) played on unknown. Source: Jack Rollin (ed.), Rothmans Football Yearbook 1992–93. Headline, 1991.
Legend: Blue = home team win; Yellow = draw; Red = away team win.
Locations of the Football Conference teams 1991–1992
Locations of the Football Conference teams 1991–1992

== Top scorers in order of league goals ==
Rank	Player	Club	League	FA Cup	FA Trophy	League Cup	Total
1	(England) Paul Cavell	Redbridge Forest	29	1	2	1	33
=	(England) Terry Robbins	Welling United	29	0	1	0	30
3	(England) Gary Jones	Boston United	27	2	1	1	31
4	(England) Roy McDonough	Colchester United	26	1	2	0	29
5	(England) Simon Read	Farnborough Town	21	9	3	2	35
=	(England) Karl Thomas	Witton Albion	21	3	4	1	29
7	(England) Steve McGavin	Colchester United	20	2	4	2	28
=	(Wales) David Webley	Merthyr Tydfil	20	0	0	0	20
9	(England) Gary Abbott	Welling United	19	5	1	0	25
=	(England) Ken McKenna	Altrincham	19	0	0	1	20
=	(England) Malcolm O'Connor	Northwich Victoria	19	0	1	2	22
=	(England) Paul Randall	Bath City	19	3	1	2	25
13	(England) Jon Graham	Kettering Town	18	3	0	0	21
=	(England) Keith Scott	Wycombe Wanderers	18	0	1	1	20
15	(England) Gary Bennett	Colchester United	16	0	2	0	18
=	(England) Richard Hill	Kettering Town	16	1	2	0	19
=	(England) Mickey Spencer	Yeovil Town	16	1	4	3	24
=	(Wales) Ceri Williams	Merthyr Tydfil	16	1	1	1	19

== Promotion and relegation ==
=== Promoted ===
- Colchester United (to the Football League Third Division)
- Bromsgrove Rovers (from the Southern Premier League)
- Stalybridge Celtic (from the Northern Premier League)
- Woking (from the Isthmian League)

=== Relegated ===
- Barrow (to the Northern Premier League)
- Cheltenham Town (to the Southern Premier League)
