= 1991–92 FA Trophy =

FA Challenge Trophy

Tournament details
- Country: England; Wales
- Teams: 180

Final positions
- Champions: Colchester United
- Runners-up: Witton Albion

The 1991–92 FA Trophy was the twenty-third season of the FA Trophy.

== First qualifying round ==
The matches (no including replays) were played on September 21, 1991.

=== Ties ===
Tie	Home team	Score	Away team
1	Alnwick Town	0–5	Southport
2	Alvechurch	0–1	Gainsborough Trinity
3	Andover	1–2	Bashley
4	Barking	4–2	Rushden Town
5	Newport A F C	1–0	Bideford
6	Boreham Wood	4–1	Aveley
7	Brandon United	1–1	Spennymoor United
8	Bridgend Town	3–1	Poole Town
9	Bromley	3–0	Basingstoke Town
10	Bromsgrove Rovers	1–1	Bedworth United
11	Chalfont St Peter	3–2	Stourbridge
12	Chelmsford City	0–1	St Albans City
13	Chesham United	1–0	Tamworth
14	Congleton Town	0–3	Atherstone United
15	Consett	0–3	Shildon
16	Corby Town	1–3	Leyton Wingate
17	Dorking	2–1	Bognor Regis Town
18	Dudley Town	5–3	Redditch United
19	Eastwood Town	5–1	Caernarfon Town
20	Erith & Belvedere	3–3	Walton & Hersham
21	Ferryhill Athletic	0–2	Whitley Bay
22	Goole Town	2–1	Warrington Town
23	Gosport Borough	4–1	Croydon
24	Grantham Town	0–2	Buxton
25	Hayes	3–1	Baldock Town
26	Hitchin Town	2–1	Grays Athletic
27	Maidenhead United	4–0	Canterbury City
28	Margate	1–1	Abingdon Town
29	Molesey	2–3	Marlow
30	Moor Green	5–2	Radcliffe Borough
31	Mossley	2–3	Alfreton Town
32	Nuneaton Borough	0–0	Marine
33	Peterlee Newtown	0–2	Murton
34	Rhyl	1–1	Halesowen Town
35	Salisbury	1–0	Cwmbran Town
36	Staines Town w/o-scr Vauxhall Motors		
37	Stevenage Borough	2–3	Wembley
38	Taunton Town	6–2	Maesteg Park
39	Ton Pentre	2–3	Barry Town
40	Trowbridge Town	1–1	Dorchester Town
41	Uxbridge	1–2	Tooting & Mitcham United
42	Waterlooville	3–2	Crawley Town
43	Weston Super Mare	2–2	Saltash United
44	Whickham	1–2	North Shields
45	Whitby Town	2–1	Newcastle Blue Star
46	Willenhall Town	3–1	Colwyn Bay
47	Winsford United	3–0	Newtown
48	Workington	2–2	Northallerton Town
49	Worksop Town	1–1	Matlock Town
50	Yeading	2–1	Fareham Town

=== Replays ===
Tie	Home team	Score	Away team
7	Spennymoor United	1–0	Brandon United
10	Bedworth United	1–2	Bromsgrove Rovers
20	Walton & Hersham	2–1	Erith & Belvedere
28	Abingdon Town	0–1	Margate
32	Marine	2–2	Nuneaton Borough
34	Halesowen Town	1–2	Rhyl
40	Dorchester Town	3–2	Trowbridge Town
43	Saltash United	5–3	Weston Super Mare
48	Northallerton Town	4–0	Workington
49	Matlock Town	3–3	Worksop Town

=== 2nd replay ===
Tie	Home team	Score	Away team
32	Nuneaton Borough	0–1	Marine
49	Matlock Town	2–0	Worksop Town

== Second qualifying round ==
The matches (no including replays) were played on October 19, 1991.

=== Ties ===
Tie	Home team	Score	Away team
1	Accrington Stanley	5–2	Shildon
2	Alfreton Town	0–3	Atherstone United
3	Barking	0–2	Chalfont St Peter
4	Barry Town	2–0	Bridgend Town
5	Bashley	3–1	Ashford Town (Kent)
6	Bishop's Stortford	1–1	Boreham Wood
7	Bromley	2–0	Maidenhead United
8	Bromsgrove Rovers	1–0	Hednesford Town
9	Buxton	1–3	Moor Green
10	Chesham United	1–0	Leyton Wingate
11	Dorking	2–1	Yeading
12	Droylsden	1–1	Winsford United
13	Dudley Town	2–1	Shepshed Albion
14	Eastwood Town	1–2	Rhyl
15	Goole Town	1–3	Marine
16	Gosport Borough	0–2	Marlow
17	Hitchin Town	2–3	St Albans City
18	Leicester United	1–0	Gainsborough Trinity
19	Llanelli	1–3	Dorchester Town
20	Newport A F C	5–4	Saltash United
21	Northallerton Town	0–0	Whitley Bay
22	Salisbury	4–1	Taunton Town
23	Southport	4–1	North Shields
24	Spennymoor United	1–2	Easington Colliery
25	Staines Town	0–1	Heybridge Swifts
26	Sutton Coldfield Town	2–0	Hayes
27	Tooting & Mitcham United	3–0	Dulwich Hamlet
28	Waterlooville	1–1	Walton & Hersham
29	Wembley	0–0	Harlow Town
30	Whitby Town	5–1	Murton
31	Whyteleafe	1–2	Margate
32	Willenhall Town	2–3	Matlock Town

=== Replays ===
Tie	Home team	Score	Away team
6	Boreham Wood	0–1	Bishop's Stortford
12	Winsford United	1–3	Droylsden
21	Whitley Bay	2–3	Northallerton Town
28	Walton & Hersham	4–0	Waterlooville
29	Harlow Town	0–1	Wembley

== Third qualifying round ==
The matches (no including replays) were played on November 30, 1991.

=== Ties ===
Tie	Home team	Score	Away team
1	Atherstone United	1–1	Heybridge Swifts
2	Bashley	2–0	Carshalton Athletic
3	Billingham Synthonia	4–1	Droylsden
4	Blyth Spartans	4–0	Accrington Stanley
5	Bromley	1–0	Weymouth
6	Burton Albion	0–0	Chesham United
7	Chorley	0–2	Frickley Athletic
8	Dagenham	3–2	St Albans City
9	Dorking	2–1	Barry Town
10	Dudley Town	2–3	Worcester City
11	Fisher Athletic	1–1	Bromsgrove Rovers
12	Fleetwood Town	4–0	Seaham Red Star
13	Gravesend & Northfleet	1–3	Marlow
14	Harrow Borough	2–1	Bishop's Stortford
15	Hendon	0–0	Wealdstone
16	Horwich R M I	1–3	Marine
17	Kingstonian	3–0	Dorchester Town
18	Moor Green	1–3	Boston United
19	Morecambe	2–2	Emley
20	Northallerton Town	4–2	Matlock Town
21	Rhyl	0–3	Southport
22	Slough Town	0–0	Margate
23	South Bank	1–1	Bangor City
24	Stroud	1–3	Newport A F C
25	Sutton Coldfield Town	2–1	Cambridge City
26	Tooting & Mitcham United	0–0	Walton & Hersham
27	Tow Law Town	0–3	Bishop Auckland
28	V S Rugby	2–1	Leicester United
29	Wembley	2–0	Chalfont St Peter
30	Whitby Town	1–0	Easington Colliery
31	Windsor & Eton	2–2	Sutton United
32	Wokingham Town	0–0	Salisbury

=== Replays ===
Tie	Home team	Score	Away team
1	Heybridge Swifts	0–1	Atherstone United
6	Chesham United	4–0	Burton Albion
11	Bromsgrove Rovers	2–0	Fisher Athletic
15	Wealdstone	4–1	Hendon
19	Emley	2–4	Morecambe
22	Margate	1–2	Slough Town
23	Bangor City	1–0	South Bank
26	Walton & Hersham	2–1	Tooting & Mitcham United
31	Sutton United	4–2	Windsor & Eton
32	Salisbury	1–0	Wokingham Town

== 1st round ==
The teams that given byes to this round are Wycombe Wanderers, Colchester United, Altrincham, Kettering Town, Telford United, Macclesfield Town, Runcorn, Merthyr Tydfil, Barrow, Welling United, Northwich Victoria, Kidderminster Harriers, Yeovil Town, Stafford Rangers, Cheltenham Town, Gateshead, Bath City, Farnborough Town, Witton Albion, Redbridge Forest, Aylesbury United, Dartford, Woking, Dover Athletic, Hyde United, Leek Town, Gretna, Gloucester City, Stalybridge Celtic, Enfield, Wivenhoe Town and Guisborough Town. The matches (no including replays) were played on January 11, 1992.

=== Ties ===
Tie	Home team	Score	Away team
1	Altrincham	1–2	Stalybridge Celtic
2	Atherstone United	1–3	Dorking
3	Aylesbury United	3–2	Newport A F C
4	Bangor City	0–0	Gretna
5	Blyth Spartans	0–0	Gateshead
6	Bromley	1–0	Worcester City
7	Cheltenham Town	3–2	Wealdstone
8	Colchester United	2–2	Kingstonian
9	Dagenham	0–0	Bashley
10	Enfield	4–0	Slough Town
11	Fleetwood Town	1–1	Morecambe
12	Frickley Athletic	2–2	Northallerton Town
13	Gloucester City	1–2	Harrow Borough
14	Leek Town	3–3	Runcorn
15	Macclesfield Town	0–0	Boston United
16	Merthyr Tydfil	1–1	Dartford
17	Northwich Victoria	1–0	Hyde United
18	Redbridge Forest	1–1	Bromsgrove Rovers
19	Southport	1–0	Bishop Auckland
20	Stafford Rangers	0–1	Marine
21	Sutton Coldfield Town	0–3	Farnborough Town
22	Sutton United	1–2	Bath City
23	Telford United	2–0	Guisborough Town
24	V S Rugby	0–1	Kettering Town
25	Walton & Hersham	0–2	Kidderminster Harriers
26	Welling United	3–2	Dover Athletic
27	Whitby Town	0–2	Barrow
28	Witton Albion	2–2	Billingham Synthonia
29	Wivenhoe Town	1–0	Marlow
30	Woking	4–2	Wembley
31	Wycombe Wanderers	2–0	Salisbury
32	Yeovil Town	3–1	Chesham United

=== Replays ===
Tie	Home team	Score	Away team
4	Gretna	1–2	Bangor City
5	Gateshead	3–0	Blyth Spartans
8	Kingstonian	2–3	Colchester United
9	Bashley	2–0	Dagenham
11	Morecambe	1–0	Fleetwood Town
12	Northallerton Town	1–0	Frickley Athletic
14	Runcorn	3–1	Leek Town
15	Boston United	0–2	Macclesfield Town
16	Dartford	1–2	Merthyr Tydfil
18	Bromsgrove Rovers	1–2	Redbridge Forest
28	Billingham Synthonia	1–2	Witton Albion

== 2nd round ==
The matches (no including replays) were played on February 1, 1992.

=== Ties ===
Tie	Home team	Score	Away team
1	Bashley	2–3	Kettering Town
2	Bath City	2–0	Dorking
3	Bromley	1–3	Yeovil Town
4	Farnborough Town	5–0	Southport
5	Gateshead	1–0	Barrow
6	Harrow Borough	1–3	Stalybridge Celtic
7	Macclesfield Town	1–0	Bangor City
8	Marine	3–0	Wivenhoe Town
9	Merthyr Tydfil	0–0	Colchester United
10	Morecambe	2–1	Welling United
11	Northwich Victoria	4–2	Cheltenham Town
12	Redbridge Forest	2–0	Enfield
13	Runcorn	1–1	Kidderminster Harriers
14	Telford United	3–0	Northallerton Town
15	Witton Albion	1–0	Aylesbury United
16	Wycombe Wanderers	1–0	Woking

=== Replays ===
Tie	Home team	Score	Away team
9	Colchester United	1–0	Merthyr Tydfil
13	Kidderminster Harriers	5–2	Runcorn

== 3rd round ==
The matches (no including replays) were played on February 22, 1992.

=== Ties ===
Tie	Home team	Score	Away team
1	Bath City	1–1	Wycombe Wanderers
2	Colchester United	3–1	Morecambe
3	Marine	2–1	Kettering Town
4	Northwich Victoria	0–1	Macclesfield Town
5	Redbridge Forest	3–2	Farnborough Town
6	Telford United	0–0	Gateshead
7	Witton Albion	1–0	Stalybridge Celtic
8	Yeovil Town	3–1	Kidderminster Harriers

=== Replays ===
Tie	Home team	Score	Away team
1	Wycombe Wanderers	2–0	Bath City
6	Gateshead	0–1	Telford United

== 4th round ==
The matches (no including replays) were played on March 14, 1992.

=== Ties ===
Tie	Home team	Score	Away team
1	Colchester United	4–0	Telford United
2	Marine	1–1	Redbridge Forest
3	Wycombe Wanderers	1–2	Witton Albion
4	Yeovil Town	1–2	Macclesfield Town

=== Replays ===
Tie	Home team	Score	Away team
2	Redbridge Forest	0–1	Marine

== Semi finals ==
The first legs were played on April 4, 1992, and the second legs were played on April 10–11, 1992.

=== First leg ===
Tie	Home team	Score	Away team
1	Colchester United	3–0	Macclesfield Town
2	Witton Albion	2–2	Marine

=== Second leg ===
Tie	Home team	Score	Away team	Aggregate
1	Macclesfield Town	1–1	Colchester United	1–4
2	Marine	1–4	Witton Albion	3–6

== Final ==
The match was played on May 10, 1992.

=== Tie ===
Home team	Score	Away team
Colchester United	3–1	Witton Albion
