= 1995–96 Colchester United F.C. season =

Colchester United
1995–96 season
- Chairman: Gordon Parker
- Manager: Steve Wignall
- Stadium: Layer Road
- Third Division: 7th
- Play-offs: Semi-final (eliminated by Plymouth Argyle
- FA Cup: 1st round (eliminated by Gravesend & Northfleet)
- League Cup: 1st round (eliminated by Bristol City)
- Football League Trophy: Quarter-final (southern section) (eliminated by Peterborough United
- Top goalscorer: League: Tony Adcock (12); All: Tony Adcock (17)
- Highest home attendance: 6,511 v Plymouth Argyle, 12 May 1996
- Lowest home attendance: 1,122 v Torquay United, 26 September 1995
- Average home league attendance: 3,299
- Biggest win: 3–0 v Lincoln City, 26 August 1995; 4–1 v Hartlepool United, 7 October 1995; 5–2 v Torquay United, 26 September 1995
- Biggest defeat: 0–2 v Swindon Town, 8 November 1995 v Gravesend & Northfleet, 11 November 1995 v Wigan Athletic, 30 January 1996 v Preston North End, 17 February 1996; 1–3 v Cambridge United, 29 August 1995 v Mansfield Town, 25 November 1995 v Plymouth Argyle, 15 May 1996
Home colours

The 1995–96 season was Colchester United's 54th season in their history and their fourth consecutive season in the fourth tier of English football, the Third Division. Alongside competing in the Third Division, the club also participated in the FA Cup, the League Cup and the Football League Trophy.

Steve Wignall took his side to the play-offs in his first full season in charge, finishing the campaign in seventh place. They couldn't progress further than the semi-final, after being knocked out over two legs by Neil Warnock's eventual play-off winners Plymouth Argyle.

In the cup competitions, Colchester were eliminated by non-League opposition in the FA Cup at the first round stage with Gravesend & Northfleet vanquishing, while Bristol City also beat Colchester over two legs in the League Cup first round. The U's progressed from their group in the Football League Trophy but were beaten by Peterborough United in the southern section quarter-final.

== Season overview ==
Manager Steve Wignall settled into his first full season in charge by bringing in former fan favourite Tony Adcock during the summer. He also allowed Mark Kinsella to remain with the club on a rolling contract while he harboured ambitions of playing at a higher level.

Colchester slipped up in the FA Cup once again to non-League opposition when Gravesend & Northfleet won 2–0 in the first round. This came after Colchester had already exited the League Cup to Bristol City, also in the first round. The U's reached the area quarter-final of the Football League Trophy but were knocked out by Peterborough United

Boosted by the loan signing of striker Scott McGleish from Peterborough and they rallied for the play-off positions late season. With Joe Dunne scoring an injury time winner at Mansfield Town, Colchester needed a win on the final day of the regular season against Doncaster Rovers to secure a play-off spot. Paul Gibbs' mishit cross looped in to seal a narrow 1–0 victory and a play-off semi-final with Neil Warnock's Plymouth Argyle.

Ahead of the play-offs, Warnock taunted:

Little teams like Colchester shouldn't even be on the same pitch as big clubs like Plymouth

Mark Kinsella's long range effort gave Colchester a 1–0 win in the first leg in front of a 6,511 Layer Road crowd to make Warnock eat his words. In the away leg at Home Park, Warnock's squad, assembled for over £1m, took an early lead, before taking an aggregate lead prior to half-time through Chris Leadbitter. Kinsella scored just after the hour mark to level the aggregate score at 2–2 but with the vital away goal, but five minutes from time, Plymouth added a third and denied the U's a second trip to Wembley.

== Players ==
As of match played 15 May 1996.

Name	Position	Nationality	Place of birth	Date of birth	Apps	Goals	Signed from	Date signed	Fee
Goalkeepers
Garrett Caldwell	GK	(Canada)	(United States) Princeton	6 November 1973 (aged 21)	0	0	(United States) Princeton Tigers	25 September 1995	Free transfer
Carl Emberson	GK	(England)	Epsom	13 July 1973 (aged 21)	35	0	(England) Millwall	6 July 1994	£25,000
Defenders
Simon Betts	FB	(England)	Middlesbrough	3 March 1973 (aged 22)	104	3	(England) Scarborough	11 December 1992	Free transfer
Gus Caesar	CB	(England)	Tottenham	5 March 1966 (aged 29)	47	1	(Scotland) Airdrieonians	11 August 1994	Free transfer
Peter Cawley	CB	(England)	Walton-on-Thames	15 September 1965 (aged 29)	97	6	(England) Barnet	30 October 1992 (Note: Date of signing refers to the date of the player's first game in his second spell for the club)	Free transfer
Jean Dalli	FB	(England)	Enfield Town	13 August 1976 (aged 18)	1	0	Apprentice	13 August 1994 (Note: Date of signing refers to the date of the player's first game for the club)	Free transfer
Joe Dunne	FB	(Republic of Ireland)	Dublin	25 May 1973 (aged 22)	0	0	(England) Gillingham	27 March 1996	Free transfer
Tony English	DF/MF	(England)	Luton	19 October 1966 (aged 28)	489	58	(England) Coventry City	24 December 1984	Free transfer
Paul Gibbs	FB	(England)	Gorleston	26 October 1972 (aged 22)	9	0	(England) Diss Town	6 March 1995	Undisclosed
Nicky Haydon	DF/MF	(England)	Barking	10 August 1978 (aged 16)	0	0	Youth team	1 August 1995	Free transfer
Ben Lewis	CB	(England)	Chelmsford	22 June 1977 (aged 17)	0	0	(England) Heybridge Swifts	1 August 1994	Free transfer
Tony McCarthy	CB	(Republic of Ireland)	Dublin	9 November 1969 (aged 25)	10	1	(England) Millwall	17 March 1995	Free transfer
Andy Partner	CB	(England)	Colchester	21 October 1974 (aged 20)	5	0	Apprentice	16 December 1991	Free transfer
Midfielders
Steve Ball	MF	(England)	Colchester	2 September 1969 (aged 25)	71	11	(England) Cambridge United	14 September 1992	Free transfer
Tony Cook	MF	(England)	Hemel Hempstead	17 September 1976 (aged 18)	3	0	(England) Queens Park Rangers	11 January 1994	Free transfer
Tony Dennis	MF	(England)	Eton	1 December 1963 (aged 31)	41	2	(England) Chesterfield	10 August 1994	Free transfer
Karl Duguid	MF	(England)	Letchworth	21 March 1978 (aged 17)	0	0	Youth team	9 December 1995	Free transfer
Chris Fry	MF/WG	(Wales)	Cardiff	23 October 1969 (aged 25)	54	8	(England) Hereford United	24 October 1993	Nominal
David Gregory	MF	(England)	Sudbury	23 January 1970 (aged 25)	0	0	(England) Peterborough United	8 December 1995	Free transfer
Mark Kinsella	MF	(Republic of Ireland)	Dublin	12 August 1972 (aged 22)	209	32	(Republic of Ireland) Home Farm	18 August 1989	Free transfer
Adam Locke	MF/FB	(England)	Croydon	20 August 1970 (aged 24)	33	1	(England) Southend United	23 September 1994	Free transfer
Forwards
Tony Adcock	FW	(England)	Bethnal Green	27 March 1963 (aged 32)	219	112	(England) Luton Town	3 August 1995	Free transfer
Tony Lock	FW	(England)	Harlow	3 September 1976 (aged 18)	3	1	Apprentice	28 January 1995	Free transfer
Robbie Reinelt	FW	(England)	Loughton	11 March 1974 (aged 21)	5	0	(England) Gillingham	22 March 1995	Part exchange
Steve Whitton	FW	(England)	East Ham	4 December 1960 (aged 34)	52	15	(England) Ipswich Town	24 March 1994	£10,000

== Transfers ==
=== In ===
Date	Position	Nationality	Name	From	Fee	Ref.
August 1995	WG/FW	(England)	Steve Mardenborough	(England) Stafford Rangers	Free transfer	
1 August 1995	DF/MF	(England)	Nicky Haydon	Youth team	Free transfer	
3 August 1995	FW	(England)	Tony Adcock	(England) Luton Town	Free transfer	
29 September 1995	GK	(Canada)	Garrett Caldwell	(United States) Princeton Tigers	Free transfer	
17 October 1995	MF	(England)	Robert Boyce	(England) Enfield	Trial	
8 December 1995	MF	(England)	David Gregory	(England) Peterborough United	Free transfer	
9 December 1995	MF	(England)	Karl Duguid	Youth team	Free transfer	(Note: Date of signing refers to the date of the player's first game for the club)
27 March 1996	FB	(Republic of Ireland)	Joe Dunne	(England) Gillingham	Free transfer	

- Total spending: ▼ ~ £0

=== Out ===
Date	Position	Nationality	Name	To	Fee	Ref.
31 May 1995	DF	(England)	Tim Allpress	(England) Hitchin Town	Released	
31 May 1995	FW	(England)	Leighton Allen	(England) Ringmer	Released	
31 May 1995	GK	(England)	John Cheesewright	(England) Wimbledon	Released	
31 May 1995	MF	(England)	Trevor Putney	Free agent	Retired	
31 May 1995	FW	(Canada)	Niall Thompson	(United States) Seattle Sounders	Free transfer	
18 November 1995	MF	(England)	Robert Boyce	(England) Chelmsford City	End of trial	
6 December 1995	WF/FW	(England)	Steve Mardenborough	(Wales) Swansea City	Free transfer	
27 February 1996	MF	(England)	Michael Cheetham	(England) Sudbury Town	Released	

- Total incoming: ▲ ~ £0

=== Loans in ===
Date	Position	Nationality	Name	From	End date	Ref.
23 November 1995	CB	(Republic of Ireland)	David Greene	(England) Luton Town	1 March 1996	
29 December 1995	FW/WG	(England)	Paul Abrahams	(England) Brentford	20 February 1996	
23 February 1996	FW	(England)	Scott McGleish	(England) Peterborough United	31 May 1996	
8 March 1996	GK	(Australia)	Andy Petterson	(England) Charlton Athletic	31 March 1996	

== Match details ==
=== Third Division ===
==== Results round by round ====
Round	1	2	3	4	5	6	7	8	9	10	11	12	13	14	15	16	17	18	19	20	21	22	23	24	25	26	27	28	29	30	31	32	33	34	35	36	37	38	39	40	41	42	43	44	45	46
Ground	H	A	H	A	A	H	H	A	H	A	H	A	H	A	A	H	A	H	A	H	A	H	A	H	A	A	A	H	H	A	H	A	A	H	A	H	H	A	H	H	A	H	H	A	A	H
Result	W	D	W	L	W	L	D	D	W	L	W	D	W	W	D	D	L	L	D	W	D	D	W	W	D	L	D	D	L	L	D	D	W	W	D	W	W	L	W	W	L	D	D	D	W	W
Position	6	9	6	8	5	8	8	9	7	9	7	6	6	4	4	5	5	6	8	7	7	5	5	4	5	5	6	4	6	8	9	10	8	8	8	8	7	8	8	8	9	8	9	9	7	7

Source: 11v11.com
A = Away; H = Home; W = Win; D = Draw; L = Loss

==== League table ====
Pos	Team	Pld	W	D	L	GF	GA	GD	Pts	Promotion
5	Darlington	46	20	18	8	60	42	+18	78	Qualification for the Third Division play-offs
6	Hereford United	46	20	14	12	65	47	+18	74	Qualification for the Third Division play-offs
7	Colchester United	46	18	18	10	61	51	+10	72	Qualification for the Third Division play-offs
8	Barnet	46	18	16	12	65	45	+20	70	
9	Chester City	46	18	16	12	72	53	+19	70	

==== Matches ====
12 August 1995 1	Colchester United	2–1	Plymouth Argyle	Colchester
	Betts 15'; Locke 59'; English (yellow card) 51' (red card)	Report	Littlejohn 54'	Stadium: Layer Road; Attendance: 3,585; Referee: Andy D'Urso

19 August 1995 2	Barnet	1–1	Colchester United	Chipping Barnet
15:00 BST	Freedman 69'	Report	Adcock 81'	Stadium: Underhill Stadium; Attendance: 1,966; Referee: Steve Bennett

26 August 1995 3	Colchester United	3–0	Lincoln City	Colchester
15:00 BST	Dennis 2', 8'; Mardenborough 74'	Report		Stadium: Layer Road; Attendance: 2,939; Referee: Rob Harris

29 August 1995 4	Cambridge United	3–1	Colchester United	Cambridge
19:45 BST	Palmer 15'; Joseph 23'; Corazzin 60'	Report	Adcock 49'; Cawley (yellow card) 74' (red card)	Stadium: Abbey Stadium; Attendance: 3,476; Referee: A Butler

2 September 1995 5	Gillingham	0–1	Colchester United	Gillingham
		Report	Adcock 75'	Stadium: Priestfield Stadium; Attendance: 7,667; Referee: M Pierce

9 September 1995 6	Colchester United	1–2	Chester City	Colchester
15:00 BST	Whitton 82'	Report	Priest 54'; Regis 81'; Whelan (yellow card) 65' (red card)	Stadium: Layer Road; Attendance: 3,422; Referee: Barry Knight

12 September 1995 7	Colchester United	2–2	Preston North End	Colchester
	Fry 25'; Whitton 50'	Report	Cartwright 57'; Bryson 87'; Kidd (red card) 43'	Stadium: Layer Road; Attendance: 2,869; Referee: D Orr

16 September 1995 8	Darlington	2–2	Colchester United	Darlington
	Muir 46'; Bannister 78'	Report	Dennis 10'; Cheetham 20'	Stadium: Feethams; Attendance: 1,685; Referee: David Allison

23 September 1995 9	Colchester United	2–0	Hereford United	Colchester
	Reinelt 22', 65'	Report		Stadium: Layer Road; Attendance: 2,596; Referee: G Pooley

30 September 1995 10	Scunthorpe United	1–0	Colchester United	Scunthorpe
15:00 BST	Eyre 15'	Report		Stadium: Glanford Park; Attendance: 2,051; Referee: William Burns

7 October 1995 11	Colchester United	4–1	Hartlepool United	Colchester
	Locke 9', 64'; Adcock 20'; Reinelt 26'	Report	Howard 88'	Stadium: Layer Road; Attendance: 2,618; Referee: J Brandwood

14 October 1995 12	Rochdale	1–1	Colchester United	Rochdale
	Stuart 67'	Report	Reinelt 29'; Fry (red card) 79'	Stadium: Spotland Stadium; Attendance: 2,193; Referee: G Frankland

21 October 1995 13	Colchester United	1–0	Northampton Town	Colchester
15:00 BST	Kinsella 60'	Report		Stadium: Layer Road; Attendance: 3,823; Referee: G Pooley

28 October 1995 14	Cardiff City	1–2	Colchester United	Cardiff
15:00 GMT	Adams 30'	Report	Adcock 13', 14'	Stadium: Ninian Park; Attendance: 3,207; Referee: J Rushton

31 October 1995 15	Fulham	1–1	Colchester United	Fulham
19:45 GMT	Cusack 61'	Report	Mardenborough 26'; Dennis (yellow card) 43' (red card)	Stadium: Craven Cottage; Attendance: 2,870; Referee: G Singh

4 November 1995 16	Colchester United	1–1	Exeter City	Colchester
15:00 GMT	Kinsella 20'	Report	Pears 82'	Stadium: Layer Road; Attendance: 3,377

18 November 1995 17	Doncaster Rovers	3–2	Colchester United	Doncaster
	Colcombe 18'; Jones 25', 75'	Report	Cheetham 45'; Adcock 85'	Stadium: Belle Vue; Attendance: 1,603

25 November 1995 18	Colchester United	1–3	Mansfield Town	Colchester
	Adcock 46' (pen.)	Report	Hadley 41'; Boothroyd 50' (pen.); Ireland 70'	Stadium: Layer Road; Attendance: 2,819; Referee: K Leach

9 December 1995 19	Hereford United	1–1	Colchester United	Hereford
	Smith 62'	Report	Betts 77'	Stadium: Edgar Street; Attendance: 3,324; Referee: R Poulain

16 December 1995 20	Colchester United	2–1	Scunthorpe United	Colchester
15:00 GMT	Ball 19'; Kinsella 40'	Report	Young 62'	Stadium: Layer Road; Attendance: 2,138

23 December 1995 21	Bury	0–0	Colchester United	Bury
15:00 GMT		Report		Stadium: Gigg Lane; Attendance: 3,559; Referee: Roger Furnandiz

26 December 1995 22	Colchester United	0–0	Leyton Orient	Colchester
12:00 GMT		Report		Stadium: Layer Road; Attendance: 4,965; Referee: Andy D'Urso

1 January 1996 23	Torquay United	2–3	Colchester United	Torquay
	Jack 35'; Newhouse 50'	Report	Kinsella 1'; Duguid 77'; Betts 90'	Stadium: Plainmoor; Attendance: 2,425

13 January 1996 24	Colchester United	3–2	Barnet	Colchester
15:00 GMT	Betts 5' (pen.); Abrahams 10', 16'	Report	Primus 22'; Devine 36' (red card)	Stadium: Layer Road; Attendance: 3,252; Referee: Steve Bennett

20 January 1996 25	Plymouth Argyle	1–1	Colchester United	Plymouth
	Baird 30'	Report	Greene 89'	Stadium: Home Park; Attendance: 5,800; Referee: D Orr

30 January 1996 26	Wigan Athletic	2–0	Colchester United	Wigan
	Johnson 14', 37'	Report		Stadium: Springfield Park; Attendance: 2,101; Referee: Terry Heilbron

3 February 1996 27	Lincoln City	0–0	Colchester United	Lincoln
		Report		Stadium: Sincil Bank; Attendance: 2,531; Referee: G Frankland

6 February 1996 28	Colchester United	1–1	Scarborough	Colchester
19:30 GMT	Cawley 5'	Report	Trebble 66'	Stadium: Layer Road; Attendance: 2,299; Referee: Barry Knight

10 February 1996 29	Colchester United	1–2	Wigan Athletic	Colchester
15:00 GMT	Adcock 52'	Report	Lancashire 64', 86'	Stadium: Layer Road; Attendance: 3,082; Referee: J Kirkby

17 February 1996 30	Preston North End	2–0	Colchester United	Preston
	Saville 13', 39'	Report		Stadium: Deepdale; Attendance: 9,335; Referee: G Pearson

24 February 1996 31	Colchester United	1–1	Darlington	Colchester
15:00 GMT	Adcock 38'	Report	Blake 72'	Stadium: Layer Road; Attendance: 2,653; Referee: D Orr

27 February 1996 32	Chester City	1–1	Colchester United	Chester
	Richardson 77'	Report	Gibbs 72'	Stadium: Deva Stadium; Attendance: 2,001; Referee: J Brandwood

2 March 1996 33	Leyton Orient	0–1	Colchester United	Leyton
		Report	Adcock 41' (pen.)	Stadium: Brisbane Road; Attendance: 4,049; Referee: Steve Baines

9 March 1996 34	Colchester United	1–0	Bury	Colchester
15:00 GMT	Caesar 75'	Report		Stadium: Layer Road; Attendance: 2,832; Referee: M Bailey

16 March 1996 35	Scarborough	0–0	Colchester United	Scarborough
		Report		Stadium: Athletic Ground; Attendance: 1,201; Referee: T West

19 March 1996 36	Colchester United	2–1	Cambridge United	Colchester
19:45 GMT	Adcock 9'; McGleish 51'	Report	Middleton 31'	Stadium: Layer Road; Attendance: 2,995; Referee: M Pierce

23 March 1996 37	Colchester United	3–1	Torquay United	Colchester
15:00 GMT	Fry 6'; McGleish 47'; Betts 74' (pen.)	Report	Laight 86'	Stadium: Layer Road; Attendance: 2,888; Referee: G Pooley

30 March 1996 38	Hartlepool United	2–1	Colchester United	Hartlepool
	Halliday 17'; Howard 73'	Report	Gibbs 45'; Locke (red card) 50'	Stadium: Victoria Park; Attendance: 1,364; Referee: K Lynch

2 April 1996 39	Colchester United	1–0	Rochdale	Colchester
19:45 BST	Reinelt 54'	Report		Stadium: Layer Road; Attendance: 3,021; Referee: Roger Furnandiz

6 April 1996 40	Colchester United	1–0	Cardiff City	Colchester
15:00 BST	Kinsella 56'	Report		Stadium: Layer Road; Attendance: 3,345; Referee: G Singh

8 April 1996 41	Northampton Town	2–1	Colchester United	Northampton
15:00 BST	Grayson 65'; Gibb 81'	Report	Reinelt 90'	Stadium: Sixfields Stadium; Attendance: 5,021; Referee: Steve Bennett

13 April 1996 42	Colchester United	2–2	Fulham	Colchester
15:00 BST	McGleish 43', 76'; Adcock (red card)	Report	Morgan 30'; Conroy 46'; Angus (red card)	Stadium: Layer Road; Attendance: 3,795; Referee: Uriah Rennie

16 April 1996 43	Colchester United	1–1	Gillingham	Colchester
19:45 BST	McGleish 64'	Report	Gayle 58'; Smith (red card) 70'	Stadium: Layer Road; Attendance: 4,952; Referee: P Richards

20 April 1996 44	Exeter City	2–2	Colchester United	Exeter
	Braithwaite 10'; Chamberlain 25'	Report	Caesar 6'; McGleish 65'	Stadium: St James Park; Attendance: 2,788; Referee: Eddie Wolstenholme

27 April 1996 45	Mansfield Town	1–2	Colchester United	Mansfield
	Eustace 49'	Report	Reinelt 68'; Dunne 90'	Stadium: Field Mill; Attendance: 2,073; Referee: M Fletcher

4 May 1996 46	Colchester United	1–0	Doncaster Rovers	Colchester
15:00 BST	Gibbs 45'	Report		Stadium: Layer Road; Attendance: 5,038; Referee: Clive Wilkes

==== Football League play-offs ====
12 May 1996 Semi-final 1st leg	Colchester United	1–0	Plymouth Argyle	Colchester
15:00 BST	Kinsella 44'	Report		Stadium: Layer Road; Attendance: 6,511; Referee: M Pierce

15 May 1996 Semi-final 2nd leg	Plymouth Argyle	3–1	Colchester United	Plymouth
	Evans 3'; Leadbitter 41'; Williams 85'	Report	Mark Kinsella 66'	Stadium: Home Park; Attendance: 14,525; Referee: J Kirkby
Note: Plymouth won 3–2 on aggregate

=== League Cup ===
15 August 1995 1st round 1st leg	Colchester United	2–1	Bristol City	Colchester
19:45 BST	Adcock 15'; Kinsella 16'	Report	Seal 3'	Stadium: Layer Road; Attendance: 2,831; Referee: Paul Taylor

22 August 1995 1st round 2nd leg	Bristol City	2–1 (a.e.t.) (5–4 p)	Colchester United	Bristol
	Seal 20', 81'	Report	Cheetham 61'	Stadium: Ashton Gate Stadium; Attendance: 3,648; Referee: Graham Barber
Note: Match tied 3–3, Bristol proceed following a penalty shoot-out

=== Football League Trophy ===
Group 8
Team	Pld	W	D	L	GF	GA	GD	Pts	Qualification
Swindon Town	2	1	1	0	3	1	+2	4	Qualified for next round
Colchester United	2	1	0	1	5	4	+1	3	Qualified for next round
Torquay United	2	0	1	1	3	6	−3	1	

26 September 1995 1st round (southern section)	Colchester United	5–2	Torquay United	Colchester
19:45 BST	Adcock 2', 57', 68'; Reinelt 35'; Cawley 55'	Report	Hathaway 67'; Stamps 78'	Stadium: Layer Road; Attendance: 1,122; Referee: Paul Taylor

8 November 1995 1st round (southern section)	Swindon Town	2–0	Colchester United	Swindon
	Thorne 82'; Finney 89'	Report		Stadium: County Ground; Attendance: 6,222; Referee: Paul Taylor

28 November 1995 2nd round (southern section)	Oxford United	1–2	Colchester United	Oxford
	Angel 41'	Report	Adcock 26'; Betts 68' (pen.)	Stadium: Manor Ground; Attendance: 1,943; Referee: D Orr

9 January 1996 Quarter-final (southern section)	Peterborough United	3–2	Colchester United	Peterborough
	Martindale 44', 78'; McGleish 66'	Report	Betts 71'; Kinsella 75'	Stadium: London Road Stadium; Attendance: 2,460; Referee: Roger Furnandiz

=== FA Cup ===
11 November 1995 1st round	Gravesend & Northfleet	2–0	Colchester United	Northfleet
15:00 GMT	Jackson 35'; Mortley 70'	Report		Stadium: Stonebridge Road; Attendance: 3,128; Referee: G Pooley

== Squad statistics ==
=== Appearances and goals ===
No.	Pos	Nat	Player	Total		Third Division		FA Cup		League Cup		Football League Trophy		Football League play-offs	
No.	Pos	Nat	Player	Apps	Goals	Apps	Goals	Apps	Goals	Apps	Goals	Apps	Goals	Apps	Goals
	GK	(Canada) CAN	Garrett Caldwell	1	0	0	0	0	0	0	0	1	0	0	0
	GK	(England) ENG	Carl Emberson	49	0	41	0	1	0	2	0	3	0	2	0
	DF	(England) ENG	Simon Betts	54	7	45	5	1	0	2	0	4	2	2	0
	DF	(England) ENG	Gus Caesar	29	2	23	2	1	0	2	0	1	0	2	0
	DF	(England) ENG	Peter Cawley	50	2	42	1	1	0	2	0	3	1	2	0
	DF	(Republic of Ireland) IRL	Joe Dunne	5	1	2+3	1	0	0	0	0	0	0	0	0
	DF	(England) ENG	Tony English	28	0	20+1	0	1	0	2	0	3+1	0	0	0
	DF	(England) ENG	Paul Gibbs	28	3	13+11	3	0+1	0	0	0	1	0	2	0
	DF	(England) ENG	Ben Lewis	3	0	1+1	0	0	0	0	0	1	0	0	0
	DF	(Republic of Ireland) IRL	Tony McCarthy	53	0	44	0	1	0	2	0	4	0	2	0
	MF	(England) ENG	Steve Ball	10	1	6+2	1	0	0	0	0	1+1	0	0	0
	MF	(England) ENG	Tony Dennis	36	3	24+8	3	0	0	0	0	1+1	0	2	0
	MF	(England) ENG	Karl Duguid	17	1	7+9	1	0	0	0	0	0+1	0	0	0
	MF	(Wales) WAL	Chris Fry	46	2	35+3	2	1	0	0+1	0	4	0	2	0
	MF	(England) ENG	David Gregory	10	0	7+3	0	0	0	0	0	0	0	0	0
	MF	(Republic of Ireland) IRL	Mark Kinsella	54	9	45	5	1	0	2	1	4	1	2	2
	MF	(England) ENG	Adam Locke	31	3	22+3	3	0	0	2	0	2	0	0+2	0
	FW	(England) ENG	Tony Adcock	48	17	41	12	1	0	2	1	3	4	0+1	0
	FW	(England) ENG	Robbie Reinelt	26	8	12+10	7	0	0	0+1	1	1	0	2	0
	FW	(England) ENG	Steve Whitton	16	2	10+2	2	0	0	2	0	0	0	0+2	0
Players who appeared for Colchester who left during the season
	GK	(Australia) AUS	Andy Petterson	5	0	5	0	0	0	0	0	0	0	0	0
	DF	(Republic of Ireland) IRL	David Greene	16	1	14	1	0	0	0	0	2	0	0	0
	MF	(England) ENG	Robert Boyce	2	0	0+2	0	0	0	0	0	0	0	0	0
	MF	(England) ENG	Michael Cheetham	34	3	25+3	2	1	0	2	1	3	0	0	0
	FW	(England) ENG	Paul Abrahams	9	2	8	2	0	0	0	0	1	0	0	0
	FW	(England) ENG	Steve Mardenborough	14	2	4+8	2	1	0	0	0	1	0	0	0
	FW	(England) ENG	Scott McGleish	17	6	10+5	6	0	0	0	0	0	0	2	0

=== Goalscorers ===
Place	Nationality	Position	Name	Third Division	FA Cup	League Cup	Football League Trophy	Football League play-offs	Total
1	(England)	FW	Tony Adcock	12	0	1	4	0	17
2	(Republic of Ireland)	MF	Mark Kinsella	5	0	1	1	2	9
3	(England)	FW	Robbie Reinelt	7	0	0	1	0	8
4	(England)	FB	Simon Betts	5	0	0	2	0	7
5	(England)	FW	Scott McGleish	6	0	0	0	0	6
6	(England)	MF	Michael Cheetham	2	0	1	0	0	3
6	(England)	MF	Tony Dennis	3	0	0	0	0	3
6	(England)	FB	Paul Gibbs	3	0	0	0	0	3
6	(England)	MF/FB	Adam Locke	3	0	0	0	0	3
10	(England)	FW/WG	Paul Abrahams	2	0	0	0	0	2
10	(England)	CB	Gus Caesar	2	0	0	0	0	2
10	(England)	CB	Peter Cawley	1	0	0	1	0	2
10	(Wales)	MF/WG	Chris Fry	2	0	0	0	0	2
10	(England)	WG/FW	Steve Mardenborough	2	0	0	0	0	2
10	(England)	FW	Steve Whitton	2	0	0	0	0	2
16	(England)	MF	Steve Ball	1	0	0	0	0	1
16	(England)	MF	Karl Duguid	1	0	0	0	0	1
16	(Republic of Ireland)	FB	Joe Dunne	1	0	0	0	0	1
16	(Republic of Ireland)	CB	David Greene	1	0	0	0	0	1
			Own goals	0	0	0	0	0	0
			TOTALS	61	0	3	9	2	75

=== Disciplinary record ===
Nationality	Position	Name	Third Division		FA Cup		League Cup		Football League Trophy		Football League play-offs		Total	
Nationality	Position	Name	Booked	Sent off (straight red)	Booked	Sent off (straight red)	Booked	Sent off (straight red)	Booked	Sent off (straight red)	Booked	Sent off (straight red)	Booked	Sent off (straight red)
(England)	CB	Peter Cawley	1	1	0	0	0	0	0	0	0	0	1	1
(England)	MF	Tony Dennis	1	1	0	0	0	0	0	0	0	0	1	1
(England)	DF/MF	Tony English	1	1	0	0	0	0	0	0	0	0	1	1
(England)	FW	Tony Adcock	0	1	0	0	0	0	0	0	0	0	0	1
(Wales)	MF/WG	Chris Fry	0	1	0	0	0	0	0	0	0	0	0	1
(England)	MF/FB	Adam Locke	0	1	0	0	0	0	0	0	0	0	0	1
(Republic of Ireland)	MF	Mark Kinsella	2	0	0	0	0	0	0	0	0	0	2	0
		TOTALS	5	6	0	0	0	0	0	0	0	0	5	6

=== Clean sheets ===
Number of games goalkeepers kept a clean sheet.

Place	Nationality	Player	Third Division	FA Cup	League Cup	Football League Trophy	Football League play-offs	Total
1	(England)	Carl Emberson	11	0	0	0	1	12
2	(Australia)	Andy Petterson	2	0	0	0	0	2
		TOTALS	13	0	0	0	1	14

=== Player debuts ===
Players making their first-team Colchester United debut in a fully competitive match.

Position	Nationality	Player	Date	Opponent	Ground	Notes
FW	(England)	Tony Adcock	12 August 1995	Plymouth Argyle	Layer Road	(Note: Second debut for the club)
WG/FW	(England)	Steve Mardenborough	26 August 1995	Lincoln City	Layer Road	
CB	(England)	Ben Lewis	30 September 1995	Scunthorpe United	Glanford Park	
MF	(England)	Robert Boyce	28 October 1995	Cardiff City	Ninian Park	
GK	(Canada)	Garrett Caldwell	8 November 1995	Swindon Town	County Ground	
CB	(Republic of Ireland)	David Greene	25 November 1995	Mansfield Town	Layer Road	
MF	(England)	Karl Duguid	9 December 1995	Hereford United	Edgar Street	
FW/WG	(England)	Paul Abrahams	1 January 1996	Torquay United	Plainmoor	
MF	(England)	David Gregory	13 January 1996	Barnet	Layer Road	
FW	(England)	Scott McGleish	24 February 1996	Darlington	Layer Road	
GK	(Australia)	Andy Petterson	9 March 1996	Bury	Layer Road	
FB	(Republic of Ireland)	Joe Dunne	30 March 1996	Hartlepool United	Victoria Park	

== See also ==
- List of Colchester United F.C. seasons
