= 1994–95 Colchester United F.C. season =

Colchester United
1994–95 season
- Chairman: Gordon Parker
- Manager: George Burley (until 24 December); Dale Roberts (caretaker) (24 December until 12 January); Steve Wignall (from 12 January)
- Stadium: Layer Road
- Third Division: 10th
- FA Cup: 3rd round (eliminated by Wimbledon)
- League Cup: 1st round (eliminated by Brentford)
- Football League Trophy: 1st round (southern section)
- Top goalscorer: League: Steve Whitton (10); All: Steve Whitton (13)
- Highest home attendance: 6,055 v Darlington, 4 March 1995
- Lowest home attendance: 1,486 v Leyton Orient, 27 September 1994
- Average home league attendance: 3,201
- Biggest win: 7–1 v Yeading, 22 November 1994
- Biggest defeat: 0–3 v Doncaster Rovers, 27 August 1994 v Chesterfield, 8 October 1994 v Hereford United, 8 April 1995; 1–4 v Bury, 25 February 1995
Home colours

The 1994–95 season was Colchester United's 53rd season in their history and their third consecutive season in the fourth tier of English football, the Third Division. Alongside competing in the Third Division, the club also participated in the FA Cup, the League Cup and the Football League Trophy.

George Burley was installed as Roy McDonough's replacement following his sacking at the end of last season. Following a poor start to the season, Burley turned around Colchester's fortunes as the U's lost just once in 20 league and cup matches. However, he left the club on 24 December to join local rivals Ipswich Town. Dale Roberts was placed in charge as caretaker manager before former Colchester defender Steve Wignall was appointed. He led the club to a 10th-place finish in the league.

Colchester reached the third round of the FA Cup, where they faced Premier League opposition in Wimbledon. They lost that game 1–0 at Selhurst Park. Meanwhile, the U's were eliminated from the Football League Trophy in the group stages, while Brentford won over two legs in the League Cup.

== Season overview ==
With chairman Gordon Parker sacking former manager and his own son-in-law Roy McDonough just days after the conclusion of the 1993–94 season, former Ayr United player-manager George Burley was appointed his replacement in July. Burley had a shaky start, with a number of youth team players called up for the first game of the season due to injuries. With coach Dale Roberts his assistant, Burley brought in new players, and following six straight defeats from the beginning of the season, the management team turned results around with just one defeat in 20 league and cup matches.

Unbeknownst to Colchester United supporters for their Boxing Day clash with Northampton Town at Layer Road, Burley had in fact resigned after local rivals Ipswich Town had been refused permission to speak with him regarding their vacant managers position. He left the club in fifth place in the table, but one that soured relations with the Suffolk club. Dale Roberts was appointed caretaker manager. He led the U's out at Selhurst Park to face Wimbledon in the third round of the FA Cup, the first time that Colchester would face Premier League opposition. The hosts won 1–0, with half of the 6,903 crowd at Selhurst Park Colchester United supporters. Days later, former Colchester defender Steve Wignall was appointed as Burley's replacement.

On 4 March, Colchester allowed free admittance to all attending the clash with Darlington, including away supporters. Colchester won the game 1–0 in front of a bumper 6,055 crowd.

In the latter stages of the campaign, the U's looked well placed to claim a play-off position, but with just two points earned from the last four games of the season, Colchester eventually finished 10th, twelve points adrift of the play-off spots.

== Players ==
As of match played 6 May 1995.

Name	Position	Nationality	Place of birth	Date of birth	Apps	Goals	Signed from	Date signed	Fee
Goalkeepers
John Cheesewright	GK	(England)	Romford	12 January 1973 (aged 21)	18	0	(England) Braintree Town	11 January 1994 (Note: Date of signing refers to the date of the player's first game for the club)	£10,000
Carl Emberson	GK	(England)	Epsom	13 July 1973 (aged 20)	13	0	(England) Millwall	6 July 1994	£25,000
Defenders
Tim Allpress	DF	(England)	Hitchin	27 January 1971 (aged 23)	27	0	(Germany) Bayer Uerdingen	16 August 1993	Undisclosed
Simon Betts	FB	(England)	Middlesbrough	3 March 1973 (aged 21)	63	1	(England) Scarborough	11 December 1992	Free transfer
Gus Caesar	CB	(England)	Tottenham	5 March 1966 (aged 28)	0	0	(Scotland) Airdrieonians	11 August 1994	Free transfer
Peter Cawley	CB	(England)	Walton-on-Thames	15 September 1965 (aged 28)	68	4	(England) Barnet	30 October 1992 (Note: Date of signing refers to the date of the player's first game in his second spell for the club)	Free transfer
Jean Dalli	FB	(England)	Enfield Town	13 August 1976 (aged 17)	0	0	Apprentice	13 August 1994	Free transfer
Tony English	DF/MF	(England)	Luton	19 October 1966 (aged 27)	448	55	(England) Coventry City	24 December 1984	Free transfer
Paul Gibbs	FB	(England)	Gorleston	26 October 1972 (aged 21)	0	0	(England) Diss Town	6 March 1995	Undisclosed
Ben Lewis	CB	(England)	Chelmsford	22 June 1977 (aged 16)	0	0	(England) Heybridge Swifts	1 August 1994	Free transfer
Tony McCarthy	CB	(Republic of Ireland)	Dublin	9 November 1969 (aged 24)	0	0	(England) Millwall	17 March 1995	Free transfer
Andy Partner	CB	(England)	Colchester	21 October 1974 (aged 19)	4	0	Apprentice	16 December 1991	Free transfer
Midfielders
Steve Ball	MF	(England)	Colchester	2 September 1969 (aged 24)	71	11	(England) Cambridge United	14 September 1992	Free transfer
Michael Cheetham	MF	(England)	(Netherlands) Amsterdam	30 June 1967 (aged 26)	0	0	(England) Chestefield	23 March 1995	Free transfer
Tony Cook	MF	(England)	Hemel Hempstead	17 September 1976 (aged 17)	3	0	(England) Queens Park Rangers	11 January 1994	Free transfer
Tony Dennis	MF	(England)	Eton	1 December 1963 (aged 30)	0	0	(England) Chesterfield	10 August 1994	Free transfer
Chris Fry	MF/WG	(Wales)	Cardiff	23 October 1969 (aged 24)	17	0	(England) Hereford United	24 October 1993	Nominal
Mark Kinsella	MF	(Republic of Ireland)	Dublin	12 August 1972 (aged 21)	159	23	(Republic of Ireland) Home Farm	18 August 1989	Free transfer
Adam Locke	MF/FB	(England)	Croydon	20 August 1970 (aged 23)	5	0	(England) Southend United	23 September 1994	Free transfer
Trevor Putney	MF	(England)	Harold Hill	9 April 1960 (aged 34)	7	0	(England) Leyton Orient	15 October 1994	Free transfer
Forwards
Leighton Allen	FW	(England)	Brighton	22 November 1973 (aged 20)	0	0	(England) Gillingham	31 August 1994	Undisclosed
Tony Lock	FW	(England)	Harlow	3 September 1976 (aged 17)	0	0	Apprentice	28 January 1995	Free transfer
Robbie Reinelt	FW	(England)	Loughton	11 March 1974 (aged 20)	0	0	(England) Gillingham	22 March 1995	Part exchange
Niall Thompson	FW	(Canada)	(England) Birmingham	16 April 1974 (aged 20)	0	0	(England) Crystal Palace	22 November 1994	Non-contract
Steve Whitton	FW	(England)	East Ham	4 December 1960 (aged 33)	8	2	(England) Ipswich Town	24 March 1994	£10,000

== Transfers ==
=== In ===
Date	Position	Nationality	Name	From	Fee	Ref.
1 June 1994	FB	(Scotland)	George Burley	(Scotland) Motherwell	Undisclosed	
6 July 1994	GK	(England)	Carl Emberson	(England) Millwall	£25,000	
1 August 1994	CB	(England)	Ben Lewis	(England) Heybridge Swifts	Free transfer	
11 August 1994	CB	(England)	Gus Caesar	(Scotland) Airdrieonians	Free transfer	
11 August 1994	FB	(England)	Gary Culling	(England) Braintree Town	£5,000	
13 August 1994	FB	(England)	Jean Dalli	Apprentice	Free transfer	(Note: Date of signing refers to the date of the player's first game for the club)
16 August 1994	MF	(England)	Danny Roberts	Apprentice	Free transfer	
18 August 1994	FB	(England)	Arron Davis	(England) Torquay United	Trial	
31 August 1994	FW	(England)	Leighton Allen	(England) Gillingham	Undisclosed	
23 September 1994	MF/FB	(England)	Adam Locke	(England) Southend United	Free transfer	
15 October 1994	MF	(England)	Trevor Putney	(England) Leyton Orient	Free transfer	(Note: Date of signing refers to the date of the player's first game in his second spell for the club)
22 November 1994	FW	(Canada)	Niall Thompson	(England) Crystal Palace	Non-contract	
28 January 1995	FW	(England)	Tony Lock	Apprentice	Free transfer	
6 March 1995	FB	(England)	Paul Gibbs	(England) Diss Town	Undisclosed	
17 March 1995	CB	(Republic of Ireland)	Tony McCarthy	(England) Millwall	Free transfer	
22 March 1995	FW	(England)	Robbie Reinelt	(England) Gillingham	Part exchange with Steve Brown	
23 March 1995	MF	(England)	Michael Cheetham	(England) Chestefield	Free transfer	

- Total spending: ▼ ~ £30,000

=== Out ===
Date	Position	Nationality	Name	To	Fee	Ref.
End of season	GK	(England)	David Schultz			
Summer 1994	WG	(England)	Sean Campbell	(England) Chelmsford City	Released	
15 May 1994	FW	(England)	Roy McDonough	(England) Dagenham & Redbridge	Sacked as player-manager	
31 May 1994	MF	(England)	Alan Dickens	(England) Chesham United	Released	
20 August 1994	FB	(England)	Gary Culling	(England) Braintree Town	Released	(Note: Date of departure refers to the date of the player's final game for the club)
23 August 1994	MF	(England)	Danny Roberts	(England) Grays Athletic	Released	
3 September 1994	FB	(England)	Arron Davis	(England) Dorchester Town	End of trial	
24 December 1994	FB	(Scotland)	George Burley	(England) Ipswich Town	Resigned as manager	
March 1995	FW	(England)	Steve Brown	(England) Gillingham	Part exchange with Robbie Reinelt	
9 March 1995	FW/WG	(England)	Paul Abrahams	(England) Brentford	£30,000	

- Total incoming: ▲ ~ £30,000

=== Loans in ===
Date	Position	Nationality	Name	From	End date	Ref.
August 1994	MF	(England)	Trevor Putney	(England) Leyton Orient	24 September 1994	(Note: Loan end date refers to the date of the player's final game for the club)
27 December 1994	CB	(England)	Paul Stoneman	(England) Blackpool	28 January 1995	(Note: Loan start and end dates refer to the date of the player's first and final games for the club)
16 February 1995	FW	(England)	Carl Asaba	(England) Brentford	31 May 1995	
9 March 1995	WG	(England)	Martin Williams	(England) Luton Town	25 March 1995	

== Match details ==
=== Third Division ===
==== Results round by round ====
Round	1	2	3	4	5	6	7	8	9	10	11	12	13	14	15	16	17	18	19	20	21	22	23	24	25	26	27	28	29	30	31	32	33	34	35	36	37	38	39	40	41	42
Ground	H	A	H	A	A	H	H	A	A	H	H	A	H	A	H	A	H	H	A	H	A	H	A	H	H	A	H	A	A	A	H	A	H	H	A	H	A	H	A	H	H	A
Result	L	L	L	L	W	W	W	D	W	W	L	D	W	W	D	D	W	D	W	L	W	D	L	D	L	W	D	W	L	L	W	L	W	L	L	L	W	W	D	L	L	D
Position	19	20	21	22	20	18	13	12	12	9	9	11	9	6	7	7	7	7	5	7	7	7	8	9	11	9	8	6	7	10	7	9	8	8	9	11	10	8	8	9	10	10

Source: 11v11.com
A = Away; H = Home; W = Win; D = Draw; L = Loss

==== League table ====
Pos	Team	Pld	W	D	L	GF	GA	GD	Pts
8	Fulham	42	16	14	12	60	54	+6	62
9	Doncaster Rovers	42	17	10	15	58	43	+15	61
10	Colchester United	42	16	10	16	56	64	−8	58
11	Barnet	42	15	11	16	56	63	−7	56
12	Lincoln City	42	15	11	16	54	55	−1	56

==== Matches ====
13 August 1994 1	Colchester United	1–3	Torquay United	Colchester
15:00 BST	Kinsella 12'	Report	Okorie 13'; Buckle 42'; Trollope 51'	Stadium: Layer Road; Attendance: 3,175; Referee: Graham Barber

20 August 1994 2	Mansfield Town	2–0	Colchester United	Mansfield
	Holland 80'; Hadley 90'	Report		Stadium: Field Mill; Attendance: 2,247; Referee: Neale Barry

27 August 1994 3	Colchester United	0–3	Doncaster Rovers	Colchester
		Report	Jones 12'; Donaldson 35', 75'	Stadium: Layer Road; Attendance: 2,320

30 August 1994 4	Exeter City	1–0	Colchester United	Exeter
	Bailey 18'	Report		Stadium: St James Park; Attendance: 1,804; Referee: Steve Dunn

3 September 1994 5	Scarborough	0–1	Colchester United	Scarborough
		Report	Dennis 70'	Stadium: Athletic Ground; Attendance: 1,494

10 September 1994 6	Colchester United	1–0	Hartlepool United	Colchester
15:00 BST	Whitton 53'	Report		Stadium: Layer Road; Attendance: 2,428; Referee: G Pooley

13 September 1994 7	Colchester United	3–2	Walsall	Colchester
19:30 BST	Kinsella 87', 90'; Whitton 89'	Report	Lightbourne 23'; Houghton 90'	Stadium: Layer Road; Attendance: 2,239; Referee: Rob Harris

17 September 1994 8	Torquay United	3–3	Colchester United	Torquay
	Trollope 3'; Hancox 67'; Darby 88'	Report	Whitton 63'; Brown 71'; Dennis 89'	Stadium: Plaimoor; Attendance: 3,390; Referee: J Holbrook

24 September 1994 9	Darlington	2–3	Colchester United	Darlington
	Chapman 45'; Himsworth 47'	Report	Whitton 27', 76'; Brown 36'	Stadium: Feethams; Attendance: 2,260; Referee: William Burns

1 October 1994 10	Colchester United	1–0	Bury	Colchester
	Cawley 79'	Report		Stadium: Layer Road; Attendance: 3,286; Referee: Paul Alcock

8 October 1994 11	Colchester United	0–3	Chesterfield	Colchester
		Report	Davis 22'; Moss 67'; Morris 90'	Stadium: Layer Road; Attendance: 3,476; Referee: Steve Dunn

15 October 1994 12	Carlisle United	0–0	Colchester United	Carlisle
		Report		Stadium: Brunton Park; Attendance: 5,817; Referee: G Cain

22 October 1994 13	Colchester United	3–1	Preston North End	Colchester
15:00 BST	Brown 11', 78'; Whitton 49'	Report	Trebble 46'	Stadium: Layer Road; Attendance: 3,015; Referee: K Leach

29 October 1994 14	Wigan Athletic	1–2	Colchester United	Wigan
	Robertson 76'	Report	Kinsella 31'; Fry 39'	Stadium: Springfield Park; Attendance: 1,621; Referee: K Lynch

5 November 1994 15	Colchester United	2–2	Gillingham	Colchester
15:00 GMT	Fry 29'; Kinsella 53'	Report	Reinelt 8'; Pike 27'	Stadium: Layer Road; Attendance: 3,817; Referee: M Pierce

19 November 1994 16	Rochdale	0–0	Colchester United	Rochdale
		Report		Stadium: Spotland Stadium; Attendance: 1,903; Referee: Uriah Rennie

26 November 1994 17	Colchester United	4–2	Scunthorpe United	Colchester
15:00 GMT	Brown 26'; Abrahams 45', 87'; Whitton 79'	Report	Thornber 54'; Knill 85'	Stadium: Layer Road; Attendance: 2,904; Referee: Keith Cooper

10 December 1994 18	Colchester United	1–1	Mansfield Town	Colchester
15:00 GMT	Fry 8'	Report	Wilkinson 48'	Stadium: Layer Road; Attendance: 3,016; Referee: Graham Barber

16 December 1994 19	Doncaster Rovers	1–2	Colchester United	Doncaster
	Brabin 79'	Report	Cawley 60'; Brown 84'	Stadium: Belle Vue; Attendance: 2,460; Referee: I Cruickshanks

26 December 1994 20	Colchester United	0–1	Northampton Town	Colchester
12:00 GMT		Report	Harmon 35' (pen.)	Stadium: Layer Road; Attendance: 5,064; Referee: Paul Alcock

27 December 1994 21	Fulham	1–2	Colchester United	Fulham
	Hamill 5'	Report	Kinsella 31'; Blake 90' (o.g.); Locke (red card) 40'	Stadium: Craven Cottage; Attendance: 4,243; Referee: Steve Dunn

31 December 1994 22	Colchester United	2–2	Hereford United	Colchester
15:00 GMT	Stoneman 76'; Whitton 89'	Report	Brough 12'; Whitton 38' (o.g.)	Stadium: Layer Road; Attendance: 3,322; Referee: G Pooley

10 January 1995 23	Preston North End	2–1	Colchester United	Preston
	Smart 44'; Trebble 85'	Report	Fry 81'; English (red card) 89'	Stadium: Deepdale; Attendance: 6,377; Referee: Neale Barry

14 January 1995 24	Colchester United	1–1	Barnet	Colchester
15:00 GMT	Putney 49'	Report	Hodges 44'	Stadium: Layer Road; Attendance: 3,706; Referee: J Rushton

28 January 1995 25	Colchester United	0–1	Wigan Athletic	Colchester
15:00 GMT		Report	Doolan 71'	Stadium: Layer Road; Attendance: 3,067; Referee: Andy D'Urso

4 February 1995 26	Scunthorpe United	3–4	Colchester United	Scunthorpe
	Eyre 4', 18'; Bullimore 16'	Report	Locke 25'; English 28'; Thompson 82', 85'	Stadium: Glanford Park; Attendance: 2,748; Referee: Roger Furnandiz

11 February 1995 27	Colchester United	0–0	Rochdale	Colchester
		Report		Stadium: Layer Road; Attendance: 3,080; Referee: M Pierce

18 February 1995 28	Barnet	0–1	Colchester United	Chipping Barnet
	Walker (yellow card) 81' (red card)	Report	Carl Asaba 18'	Stadium: Underhill Stadium; Attendance: 2,242; Referee: Rob Harris

21 February 1995 29	Lincoln City	2–0	Colchester United	Lincoln
	Bannister 78'; Johnson 90'	Report		Stadium: Sincil Bank; Attendance: 1,969; Referee: M Bailey

25 February 1995 30	Bury	4–1	Colchester United	Bury
	Stant 32'; Hughes 47'; Betts 57' (o.g.); Lucketti 68'	Report	Fry 78'; Putney (red card) 42'	Stadium: Gigg Lane; Attendance: 2,484; Referee: Jeff Winter

4 March 1995 31	Colchester United	1–0	Darlington	Colchester
15:00 GMT	Asaba 3'	Report		Stadium: Layer Road; Attendance: 6,055; Referee: A Butler

11 March 1995 32	Hartlepool United	3–1	Colchester United	Hartlepool
	Southall 13' (pen.), 35', 85' (pen.)	Report	Fry 17'	Stadium: Victoria Park; Attendance: 1,371; Referee: J Kirkby

18 March 1995 33	Colchester United	3–1	Exeter City	Colchester
15:00 GMT	Thompson 4'; Betts 78' (pen.); Lock 87'	Report	Cecere 82'	Stadium: Layer Road; Attendance: 2,375; Referee: J Holbrook

25 March 1995 34	Colchester United	0–2	Scarborough	Colchester
15:00 GMT		Report	Charles 46'; Trebble 52'	Stadium: Layer Road; Attendance: 3,025; Referee: D Orr

1 April 1995 35	Walsall	2–0	Colchester United	Walsall
	Lightbourne 71'; O'Connor 82' (pen.)	Report		Stadium: Bescot Stadium; Attendance: 3,622; Referee: P Harrison

8 April 1995 36	Hereford United	3–0	Colchester United	Hereford
	White 4', 34'; Smith 57'	Report		Stadium: Edgar Street; Attendance: 1,669; Referee: Scott Mathieson

11 April 1995 37	Gillingham	1–3	Colchester United	Gillingham
	Watson 15'	Report	Betts 58' (pen.); Thompson 87', 90'	Stadium: Priestfield Stadium; Attendance: 3,328; Referee: Paul Rejer

15 April 1995 38	Colchester United	5–2	Fulham	Colchester
15:00 BST	Cheetham 8'; English 11'; Caesar 18'; Fry 36', 56'	Report	Morgan 4'; Mison 80'; Jupp (yellow card) (red card)	Stadium: Layer Road; Attendance: 3,448; Referee: K Leach

17 April 1995 39	Northampton Town	1–1	Colchester United	Northampton
	Brown 8'	Report	Whitton 66'	Stadium: Sixfields Stadium; Attendance: 5,011; Referee: Uriah Rennie

22 April 1995 40	Colchester United	1–2	Lincoln City	Colchester
15:00 BST	McCarthy 38'	Report	Bannister 22'; Huckerby 72'	Stadium: Layer Road; Attendance: 2,654; Referee: M Bailey

29 April 1995 41	Colchester United	0–1	Carlisle United	Colchester
		Report	Walling 58'	Stadium: Layer Road; Attendance: 3,333; Referee: Steve Dunn

6 May 1995 42	Chesterfield	2–2	Colchester United	Chesterfield
	Lormor 7', 73'	Report	Whitton 38'; Putney 65' (pen.)	Stadium: Saltergate; Attendance: 4,133; Referee: A Dawson

=== League Cup ===
16 August 1994 1st round 1st leg	Colchester United	0–2	Brentford	Colchester
19:45 BST		Report	Stephenson 26'; Taylor 55'	Stadium: Layer Road; Attendance: 2,521; Referee: Andy D'Urso

23 August 1994 1st round 2nd leg	Brentford	2–0	Colchester United	Brentford
	Parris 33'; Smith 61'	Report		Stadium: Griffin Park; Attendance: 2,315; Referee: D Orr
Note: Brentford won 4–0 on aggregate.

=== Football League Trophy ===
Group 6
Team	Pld	W	D	L	GF	GA	GD	Pts	Qualification
Leyton Orient	2	1	0	1	5	3	+2	3	Qualified for next round
Fulham	2	1	0	1	5	7	−2	3	Qualified for next round
Colchester United	2	1	0	1	3	3	0	3	

27 September 1994 1st round (southern section)	Colchester United	1–0	Leyton Orient	Colchester
19:45 BST	Abrahams 63'	Report	Hague (yellow card) 66' (red card)	Stadium: Layer Road; Attendance: 1,486; Referee: M Bailey

8 November 1994 1st round (southern section)	Fulham	3–2	Colchester United	Fulham
	Haworth 3'; Adams 75'; Cusack 90'	Report	Abrahams 62'; Kinsella 66'	Stadium: Craven Cottage; Attendance: 1,451; Referee: G Pooley

=== FA Cup ===
12 November 1994 1st round	Yeading	2–2	Colchester United	Yeading
	Hippolyte 45'; Dicker 64'	Report	Kinsella 9'; Abrahams 56'	Stadium: The Warren; Attendance: 1,500; Referee: Graham Barber

22 November 1994 1st round replay	Colchester United	7–1	Yeading	Colchester
19:45 GMT	Abrahams 3', 56'; Whitton 28', 53'; Brown 33', 53'; Kinsella 82'	Report	McKinnon 27' (pen.)	Stadium: Layer Road; Attendance: 4,016; Referee: Graham Barber

3 December 1994 2nd round	Exeter City	1–2	Colchester United	Exeter
	Morgan 22'; Woodman (red card) 23'	Report	Whitton 47'; English 87'	Stadium: St James Park; Attendance: 3,528; Referee: Paul Durkin

7 January 1995 3rd round	Wimbledon	1–0	Colchester United	Selhurst
	Harford 9'	Report		Stadium: Selhurst Park; Attendance: 6,903; Referee: Paul Danson

== Squad statistics ==
=== Appearances and goals ===
No.	Pos	Nat	Player	Total		Third Division		FA Cup		League Cup		Football League Trophy	
No.	Pos	Nat	Player	Apps	Goals	Apps	Goals	Apps	Goals	Apps	Goals	Apps	Goals
	GK	(England) ENG	John Cheesewright	29	0	23	0	3	0	1	0	2	0
	GK	(England) ENG	Carl Emberson	22	0	19+1	0	1	0	1	0	0	0
	DF	(England) ENG	Tim Allpress	13	0	3+8	0	0	0	2	0	0	0
	DF	(England) ENG	Simon Betts	41	2	34+1	2	4	0	0	0	2	0
	DF	(England) ENG	Gus Caesar	47	1	39	1	4	0	2	0	2	0
	DF	(England) ENG	Peter Cawley	29	2	23	2	4	0	0	0	2	0
	DF	(England) ENG	Jean Dalli	1	0	1	0	0	0	0	0	0	0
	DF	(England) ENG	Tony English	41	3	33	2	4	1	2	0	2	0
	DF	(England) ENG	Paul Gibbs	9	0	8+1	0	0	0	0	0	0	0
	DF	(Republic of Ireland) IRL	Tony McCarthy	10	1	10	1	0	0	0	0	0	0
	DF	(England) ENG	Andy Partner	1	0	0+1	0	0	0	0	0	0	0
	MF	(England) ENG	Michael Cheetham	9	1	8+1	1	0	0	0	0	0	0
	MF	(England) ENG	Tony Dennis	41	2	32+1	2	1+3	0	2	0	2	0
	MF	(Wales) WAL	Chris Fry	37	8	24+9	8	1+1	0	1	0	0+1	0
	MF	(Republic of Ireland) IRL	Mark Kinsella	50	9	42	6	4	2	2	0	2	1
	MF	(England) ENG	Adam Locke	28	1	20+2	1	4	0	0	0	2	0
	MF	(England) ENG	Trevor Putney	30	2	28	2	2	0	0	0	0	0
	FW	(England) ENG	Leighton Allen	2	0	0+2	0	0	0	0	0	0	0
	FW	(England) ENG	Tony Lock	3	1	0+3	1	0	0	0	0	0	0
	FW	(England) ENG	Robbie Reinelt	5	0	2+3	0	0	0	0	0	0	0
	FW	(Canada) CAN	Niall Thompson	14	5	5+8	5	0+1	0	0	0	0	0
	FW	(England) ENG	Steve Whitton	44	13	36	10	4	3	2	0	2	0
Players who appeared for Colchester who left during the season
	DF	(Scotland) SCO	George Burley	9	0	5+2	0	0	0	0+1	0	0+1	0
	DF	(England) ENG	Gary Culling	3	0	2	0	0	0	1	0	0	0
	DF	(England) ENG	Arron Davis	5	0	4	0	0	0	1	0	0	0
	DF	(England) ENG	Paul Stoneman	3	1	3	1	0	0	0	0	0	0
	MF	(England) ENG	Danny Roberts	2	0	0	0	0	0	1+1	0	0	0
	FW	(England) ENG	Paul Abrahams	36	7	20+8	2	4	3	2	0	2	2
	FW	(England) ENG	Carl Asaba	12	2	9+3	2	0	0	0	0	0	0
	FW	(England) ENG	Steve Brown	36	8	26+2	6	4	2	2	0	2	0
	FW	(England) ENG	Martin Williams	3	0	3	0	0	0	0	0	0	0

=== Goalscorers ===
Place	Nationality	Position	Name	Third Division	FA Cup	League Cup	Football League Trophy	Total
1	(England)	FW	Steve Whitton	10	3	0	0	13
2	(Republic of Ireland)	MF	Mark Kinsella	6	2	0	1	9
3	(England)	FW	Steve Brown	6	2	0	0	8
3	(Wales)	MF/WG	Chris Fry	8	0	0	0	8
5	(England)	FW/WG	Paul Abrahams	2	3	0	2	7
6	(Canada)	FW	Niall Thompson	5	0	0	0	5
7	(England)	DF/MF	Tony English	2	1	0	0	3
8	(England)	FW	Carl Asaba	2	0	0	0	2
8	(England)	FB	Simon Betts	2	0	0	0	2
8	(England)	CB	Peter Cawley	2	0	0	0	2
8	(England)	MF	Tony Dennis	2	0	0	0	2
8	(England)	MF	Trevor Putney	2	0	0	0	2
13	(England)	CB	Gus Caesar	1	0	0	0	1
13	(England)	MF	Michael Cheetham	1	0	0	0	1
13	(England)	FW	Tony Lock	1	0	0	0	1
13	(England)	MF/FB	Adam Locke	1	0	0	0	1
13	(Republic of Ireland)	CB	Tony McCarthy	1	0	0	0	1
13	(England)	CB	Paul Stoneman	1	0	0	0	1
			Own goals	1	0	0	0	1
			TOTALS	56	11	0	3	70

=== Disciplinary record ===
Nationality	Position	Name	Third Division		FA Cup		League Cup		Football League Trophy		Total	
Nationality	Position	Name	Booked	Sent off (straight red)	Booked	Sent off (straight red)	Booked	Sent off (straight red)	Booked	Sent off (straight red)	Booked	Sent off (straight red)
(England)	DF/MF	Tony English	0	1	0	0	0	0	0	0	0	1
(England)	MF/FB	Adam Locke	0	1	0	0	0	0	0	0	0	1
(England)	MF	Trevor Putney	0	1	0	0	0	0	0	0	0	1
		TOTALS	0	3	0	0	0	0	0	0	0	3

=== Clean sheets ===
Number of games goalkeepers kept a clean sheet.

Place	Nationality	Player	Third Division	FA Cup	League Cup	Football League Trophy	Total
1	(England)	John Cheesewright	5	0	0	1	6
2	(England)	Carl Emberson	3	0	0	0	3
		TOTALS	8	0	0	1	9

=== Player debuts ===
Players making their first-team Colchester United debut in a fully competitive match.

Position	Nationality	Player	Date	Opponent	Ground	Notes
CB	(England)	Gus Caesar	13 August 1994	Torquay United	Layer Road	
FB	(England)	Gary Culling	13 August 1994	Torquay United	Layer Road	
FB	(England)	Jean Dalli	13 August 1994	Torquay United	Layer Road	
MF	(England)	Tony Dennis	13 August 1994	Torquay United	Layer Road	
MF	(England)	Danny Roberts	16 August 1994	Brentford	Layer Road	
FB	(England)	Arron Davis	20 August 1994	Mansfield Town	Field Mill	
FB	(Scotland)	George Burley	23 August 1994	Brentford	Griffin Park	
GK	(England)	Carl Emberson	23 August 1994	Brentford	Griffin Park	(Note: Second debut for the club)
MF	(England)	Trevor Putney	27 August 1994	Doncaster Rovers	Layer Road	
FW	(England)	Leighton Allen	10 September 1994	Hartlepool United	Layer Road	
MF/FB	(England)	Adam Locke	24 September 1994	Darlington	Feethams	
MF	(England)	Trevor Putney	15 October 1994	Carlisle United	Brunton Park	
FW	(Canada)	Niall Thompson	22 November 1994	Yeading	Layer Road	
CB	(England)	Paul Stoneman	27 December 1994	Fulham	Craven Cottage	
FW	(England)	Tony Lock	28 January 1995	Wigan Athletic	Layer Road	
FW	(England)	Carl Asaba	18 February 1995	Barnet	Underhill Stadium	
FB	(England)	Paul Gibbs	11 March 1995	Hartlepool United	Victoria Park	
WG	(England)	Martin Williams	11 March 1995	Hartlepool United	Victoria Park	
CB	(Republic of Ireland)	Tony McCarthy	18 March 1995	Exeter City	Layer Road	
MF	(England)	Michael Cheetham	18 March 1995	Scarborough	Layer Road	
FW	(England)	Robbie Reinelt	11 April 1995	Gillingham	Priestfield Stadium	

== See also ==
- List of Colchester United F.C. seasons
