= Robert Boyce =

Robert Boyce may refer to:

- Robert Boyce (historian) (born 1943), Canadian academic
- Robert Boyce (footballer) (born 1974), English footballer
- R. L. Boyce (1955–2023), American blues singer, songwriter, and guitarist
- Robert Prettyman Boyce (1814/1816–1888), member of Texas Army and businessman
- Sluggo Boyce (Robert Doucet Boyce), skateboarder and snowboarder
- Sir Robert Charles Leslie Boyce, 3rd Baronet (born 1962), of the Boyce baronets

== See also ==
- Sir Rubert William Boyce (1863–1911), English pathologist and hygienist, known for his work on tropical medicine
