= John Vaughan (footballer, born 1964) =

English footballer and coach (1964–2026)

Personal information
- Full name: John Vaughan
- Date of birth: 26 June 1964
- Place of birth: Isleworth, England
- Date of death: 22 October 2026 (aged 62)
- Height: 5 ft 10 in (1.78 m)
- Position: Goalkeeper

Youth career
- West Ham United

Senior career*
Years	Team	Apps	(Gls)
1982–1986	West Ham United	0	(0)
1985	→ Charlton Athletic (loan)	6	(0)
1985	→ Bristol Rovers (loan)	6	(0)
1985	→ Wrexham (loan)	4	(0)
1986	→ Bristol City (loan)	2	(0)
1986–1988	Fulham	44	(0)
1988	→ Bristol City (loan)	3	(0)
1988–1993	Cambridge United	178	(0)
1993–1994	Charlton Athletic	6	(0)
1994–1996	Preston North End	66	(0)
1996–2000	Lincoln City	65	(0)
1997	→ Colchester United (loan)	5	(0)
1999	→ Colchester United (loan)	6	(0)
2000	→ Chesterfield (loan)	3	(0)
Total		394	(0)
- * Club domestic league appearances and goals

John Vaughan (26 June 1964 – 22 October 2026) was an English football player and coach.

As a player he was a goalkeeper who made nearly 400 league appearances notably in the Football League with spells at Fulham, Cambridge United, Preston North End and Lincoln City. He also made brief appearances for Charlton Athletic, Bristol Rovers, Wrexham, Bristol City, Colchester United and Chesterfield. He later was goalkeeping coach at Bradford City.

== Playing career ==
A goalkeeper, Vaughan came up through the youth ranks at West Ham United although he didn't make a first team appearance at Upton Park. Whilst at West Ham he was sent out on loan to gain experience at Charlton Athletic, Bristol Rovers, Wrexham and Bristol City before Fulham paid £12,500 for his permanent services in the summer of 1986. Vaughan spent two seasons at Craven Cottage, making 44 league appearances. He was also in goal the night that Liverpool beat Fulham 10–0 in an EFL Cup game.

Vaughan was released from Fulham in 1988 and was signed by Cambridge United manager Chris Turner. Vaughan went on to enjoy success at United as, led by Turner's successor John Beck, they gained successive promotions from 1989 to 1991 to take them to the old Second Division. They finished the 1991–92 season in the play-offs for the inaugural Premier League season but were beaten by Leicester City.

During the following season Vaughan fell out of favour once Beck had been sacked and subsequent United managers Ian Atkins and Gary Johnson preferred either Jon Sheffield or John Filan much of the time. At the end of the 1992–93 season Vaughan was released and joined Charlton Athletic where he made six appearances as back-up goalkeeper to Bob Bolder.

When John Beck had taken over as manager of Preston North End he took Vaughan with him and he made 66 appearances at Deepdale. Beck was sacked and took over at Lincoln City, taking Vaughan with him again where he played a further 65 games.

He wound down his league career with loan spells at Colchester United and Chesterfield before moving into coaching.

== Coaching career ==
Vaughan went into coaching with clubs such as York City (appointed on a part-time basis in September 2003), Maccesfield Town and Grimsby Town.

After doing some part-time coaching in the academy, Vaughan was appointed goalkeeping coach at Huddersfield Town in August 2006. He was goalkeeping coach of Birmingham City from July 2012 to October 2014. In June 2015, he was appointed goalkeeping coach at Barnsley.

In June 2019 he took up the role of goalkeeping coach at Bradford City. The next month he was praised by Bradford City manager Gary Bowyer.

== Death ==
Vaughan died on 22 October 2026, aged 62.

== Honours ==
Cambridge United

- Football League Third Division: 1990–91
- Football League Fourth Division play-offs: 1990

Preston North End

- Football League Third Division: 1995–96
