= College of Haringey, Enfield and North East London =

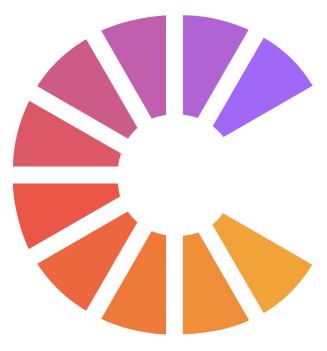

Location
- High Road; Tottenham, London, N15 4RU; England

Information
- Type: Further education
- Established: 1897-1990 – founding institutions 2009 – College of Haringey, Enfield and North East London; 2017 – constituent college of Capital City College Group
- Local authority: London Borough of Haringey, London Borough of Enfield
- Ofsted: Reports
- CEO: Angela Joyce
- Gender: Mixed
- Age: 16+
- Website: capitalccg.ac.uk/conel

The College of Haringey, Enfield and North East London (CONEL) has now been rebranded to Capital City College Group and provides further, adult and higher education full-time and part-time courses, including vocational technical courses, T Levels and professional and academic courses at different levels.

== History ==
=== Tottenham ===
==== Grove House School (1828–1878) ====
The history of the Tottenham Centre starts with the 18th century Grove House. Built in 1716 in 13 acres of wooded grounds it was the most southerly of a number of substantial country houses along Tottenham Green. In 1818 it was bought by the Society of Friends (Quakers) and opened in 1829 as a Quaker boarding school. Grove House School had a nationwide reputation and was noted for its advanced curriculum and absence of corporal punishment. It produced a number of distinguished alumni, including eleven future members of Parliament. One of these was WE Forster (1818–1886), a member of a local Tottenham Quaker family. He took the Elementary Education Act 1870 through Parliament, ensuring every child was entitled to at least an elementary education. Other well-known alumni included Dr Daniel Tuke (1827–95), an early mental health physician and Joseph Lister (1827–1912), a pioneer of antiseptic surgery. Grove House School was one of several boarding schools in Tottenham with a nationwide reputation that were established from the late 17th century to the end of the 18th century. These included Bathsua Makin's ‘school for gentlewomen’ at Tottenham High Cross, and Bruce Castle School in Lordship Lane, established by the Hill family. One member of the Hill family was Sir Rowland Hill, who established the postal system by the introduction of the penny post.

==== Tottenham Polytechnic (1897–1936) ====
Grove House School closed in 1878 and from 1892 the building was used for classes in art, science and technical subjects. In 1897 it was purchased by Middlesex County Council, becoming Tottenham Polytechnic. In 1901 the Polytechnic shared accommodation with the newly opened Tottenham County School (see below), which used the Grove House premises during the day time. Polytechnic day classes were confined to the school of art, with science, technical and commercial studies largely taking place in the evening.

In 1909 the Polytechnic offered courses in art, physiology and hygiene, science, technology, building construction, plumbing and carpentry, as well as land surveying, bus routine and gas manufacture. The commercial department included the theory and practice of commerce, shorthand and typing, commercial geography and history.

In 1910 additional buildings were constructed at the rear and the premises then comprised an assembly hall for up to 500 people, 11 classrooms, laboratories, dark room, art rooms and cookery rooms. The trade and industry courses had now expanded to include quantity surveying and mechanical engineering. There were also specialist classes in telegraphy and telephony taught by a GPO engineer, and gas supply, taught on the Gas Company premises by a gas works engineer. Particularly diverse were the commercial courses, which included commercial and industrial law, modern foreign languages (‘excellent teaching’), shorthand and typing, banking, book keeping and accountancy. In addition to the Trade and Commercial courses, there were domestic classes in cookery, dressmaking and millinery.

This range of courses reflected the nature of Tottenham's population and industry at the time. Industry consisted mainly of many small engineering and manufacturing firms, together with the nascent gas and telephone companies. There was also a considerable amount of building work with a rapid development of houses, shops, commercial and civic buildings taking place in the district at this time. Tottenham's population was mainly residential, with clerks and professional workers commuting to the City and other nearby areas. The 1911 Report noted the difficulties faced by evening-class students who often did not arrive home from work until 7.30 or 8.00 pm. Nevertheless, by 1911 there were 1,191 evening students.

In 1913 the County School moved to its new building on Tottenham Green and the Polytechnic was able to expand by extending daytime courses. A day Junior Technical School offering a two-year course for students age 13 to 16 was opened. The junior day schools were enlarged again between the wars with a Junior Technical School for boys age 13–16 in building and allied trades and a Junior Commercial School for girls and boys age 13–16 offering a general education, together with office and clerical skills. These schools provided a secondary education that could lead to apprenticeships in industry or careers in business and the professions.

There was also expansion in the third department of the Polytechnic, the Evening Institute, with four other centres across Tottenham being used. Classes were offered in art, science, matriculation, secretarial, accountancy and languages. There were courses in banking and the civil service, as well as technical and building work. The pioneering Blanche Nevile School for the Deaf, run by Tottenham Borough Council, was in nearby Philip Lane and the Polytechnic responded with classes in lip reading for teachers and parents, and language skills classes for deaf adults.

==== Tottenham Technical College ====
Student numbers rose from 857 in 1908–9 to 102,827 in 1938–39 and rebuilding became a necessity. Grove House was demolished in 1936 and the new building was opened in 1939. The Polytechnic was renamed Tottenham Technical College. The War disrupted work of the College, although courses continued to run, particularly as there was an urgent need for skilled labour in building and engineering. Part of the College was taken over by the Civil Defence, the control room for the Tottenham ARP (Air Raid Precautions) and the Auxiliary Fire Service, and normal work was frequently disrupted by air raids. In December 1940 a bomb damaged part of the recently built rear wing.

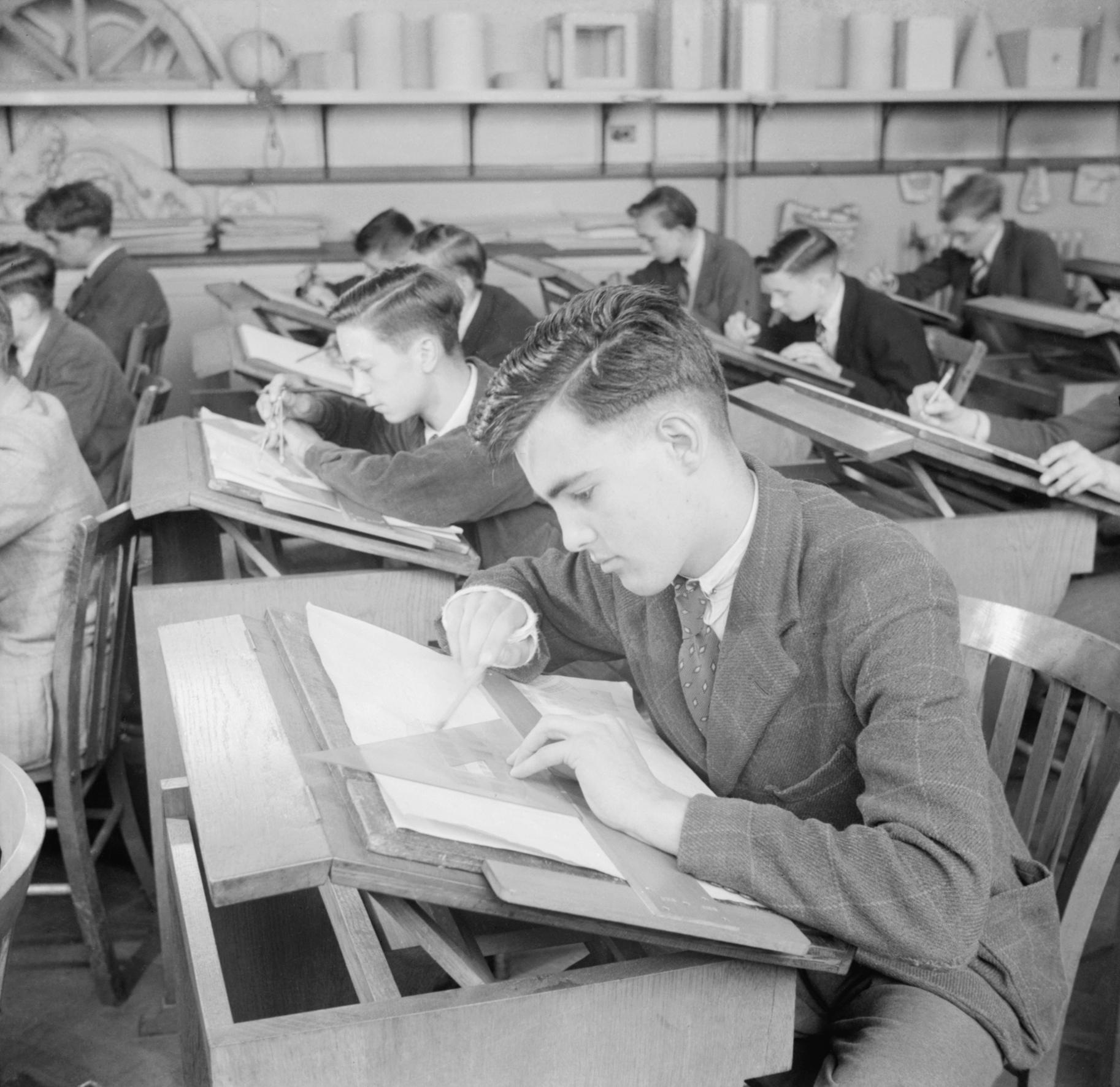
Tottenham Technical college

After the war, College work began to get back on course. The two junior departments now came under the Education Act 1944 which established secondary education for all through a selective system. Pupils sat the 11 plus examination in the last year of primary education to decide whether they went to a grammar school, secondary modern, or one of the many varied intermediate schools, such as technical schools, introduced by different local education authorities. Tottenham's two junior colleges, more vocationally oriented than other schools, started at age 13, and access to their courses was through competitive examination. During the course of the 1960s, however, these two departments were gradually phased out with changes in secondary education.

By 1950, numbers had increased to 420,139 and in 1955 a large extension was opened behind the main building to house the junior departments and technology department. In 1950, the College ran two main senior departments covering day and evening classes. The Department of Technology taught all aspects of building work and gas engineering and fitting. There were also classes in cabinet making, with the large furniture company Harris Lebus in Tottenham Hale being the biggest employer in the district. The Department of Commerce, established in 1945, ran degree courses in the evening for BA, BSc and BSc(Com) degrees. There were courses for Bankers, Auctioneers, Estate Agents, Local Government workers and Sales Managers, reflecting the high numbers of professional and middle-class workers in the locality. There were altogether 1,200 evening students in this department, with three main courses – professional, secretarial and general education. Day and evening classes were run offering secretarial, shorthand and typing courses, as well as general education. Apprentices from local industries attended general education classes as part of their day-release training.

Additional to the two main Departments, there were courses such as catering, cookery, dressmaking and Nursery Nurse training. The HMI report suggested these should be included in a Women's Department, especially as nearly half the students in the College, day and evening, were women (many of course in the Department of Commerce). By 1955 a short-lived Department of Women's Studies had been established. By 1964, the College Departments had expanded to five; Science, Health, Hairdressing, Social Studies, Business Studies and Technology. Additional classes and workshops were run in Edmonton, in the Montagu Road Centre and Wilbury Way.

==== Tottenham College of Technology (1970-1990) ====
Following local government reorganisation in 1965, the College transferred to the London Borough of Haringey. Shortly after, the Council designated a site adjacent to the College for extensions to accommodate increasing numbers and replace the two College sites in Edmonton, now part of Enfield Council. Three new blocks were opened in 1973, joined to each other and to the existing building by means of a bridge at first floor level. A second phase Tower Block was also planned. The College now became Tottenham College of Technology, and its five Departments were reorganised into Department of Building, Department of Business and Administration Studies, Department of Health, Hairdressing and Floristry, Department of Mechanical Services and Engineering and Department of Public Health and Science.

==== Merger with Haringey College (1990) ====
In April 1990, Tottenham College of technology merged with Haringey College to become the College of North East London. In January 1991 Adult Education also joined the College making a large and very diverse institution on seven sites spread across the Borough of Haringey.

==== Tottenham Green in the Polytechnic (1901–1913) ====
This site, built in 1913, is based in the former Tottenham County School. The County School was established by Middlesex County Council in 1901 as its first co-educational selective grammar school, and it was one of the first in the country. There were concerns that mixed gender education would be a challenging environment for girls and that boys would be held back. However, the headmaster Mr CH Peters noted that the fear of many parents regarding mixed education proved groundless and when His Majesty's Inspector's visited in 1902, they generally agreed that a mixed school was positive. The County School was first based in Grove House when it was the home of Tottenham Polytechnic (see above), and the history of the two institutions have been connected from the beginning. The County School, in spite of its temporary premises, got off to a good start as recorded by HMI reports. Numbers on roll started around 80, but reached 141 by the end of the year, 69 of whom were girls and 72 boys. The pupils came from a wide area, as well as Tottenham, including Edmonton, Waltham Cross, Hornsey, Wood Green, Finsbury Park, Stoke Newington, Shoreditch and Hackney. As a secondary grammar school, it was fee paying with charges of 31s6d a term, although following the 1907 Education Act some free places were reserved for successful scholarship entrants from state elementary schools

==== The County School on the Green (1913–1963) ====
In 1913 the school moved to the new building on Tottenham Green. It is part of a parade of Edwardian former Civic buildings on the east side of Tottenham Green which once included the Town Hall, swimming baths and fire station. These are now occupied by small businesses and voluntary organisations, and include the Bernie Grant Arts Centre. Tottenham Green itself, from Philip Lane to the former Grove House, on both sides of the High Road, was once the location of 17th and 18th century mansion houses occupied by the Tottenham gentry of the time, many of whom were Quakers. A number of the gentry living here played a significant part in national and international affairs, including education, the abolition of the slave trade, and social reform such as the opening of the first Penny Savings Bank by local Quaker, Priscilla Wakefield.

During the years in which it was based at the Polytechnic, Tottenham County School numbers rose to around 400. The new building on Tottenham Green had spaces for 450, but by 1936, the numbers had reached 543 due to rising numbers of children in the local population. They dropped dramatically during the War, when the school was evacuated to March, Cambridgeshire, in September 1939. In August 1940 half the evacuees returned to continue their education and the school re-opened on 9 September 1940. The Blitz had, however, started and return was delayed due to an unexploded bomb on Tottenham Green. When the school did commence work, staff and students had to share their premises with the ARP (Air Raid Precautions) and the Food Office. Students and teachers were confined to three rooms on the top floor, but nevertheless were able to present a full form for GCE examinations. Eventually, the ARP and Food Office moved out to other accommodation, and the rest of the school returned in September 1942, continuing their studies as best they could with the continuous interruptions of air raids day and night.

After the War numbers at the school continued to increase, reaching 658 in 1953. Extra space was found in nearby High Cross Memorial Hall and new buildings were planned at Selby Road, Devonshire Hill. These were occupied in 1963, but Tottenham County School closed in 1967 with the reorganisation of all Haringey Secondary schools into comprehensives. It became Tottenham School.

==== After the County School (1963–present) ====
The Tottenham Green building continued to be used for education in the years since. In 1970 it was used by Moselle school, a special school for children with moderate learning difficulties, until its move to new buildings in Adams Road in 1973. Another new school starting life in this building was Northumberland Park Community School, which opened in 1972. It later moved to new accommodation in Trulock Road, Northumberland Park.

=== Enfield ===
==== Electronics and Armaments (1901–1918) ====
The history of the Enfield Centre can be traced back to 1901, when Sir Joseph Swan opened the Ediswan Institute in Ponders End High Street for evening classes and social activities. Swan was the co-inventor with Thomas Edison of the electric light bulb and founder of the Edison Swan United Electric Light factory in Ponders End. In 1905 the building was purchased by Middlesex County Council for continuation of evening technical courses. The Institute was extended in 1911 with the opening of new buildings in the High Street and was now called the Ponders End Technical Institute, which included the newly opened day school, the Ponders End Trade School for boys age 13 to 16.

The new building included a large electrical testing laboratory and photometric optical room The Institute co-operated closely with the local electricity and gas industries in the provision of day and evening courses for workers in those trades. Another large local employer was the Royal Small Arms Factory at Enfield Lock, an important supplier of small arms to the Government. Many of the apprentices recruited to the armaments factory came from the Trade School and it was in recognition of the demand for well-qualified recruits to the factory that the War Office gave £500 to the Institute for the new 1911 building. Middlesex County Council and Enfield Urban District Council provided the rest. The Trade School offered a two-year course for boys, including basic subjects in year one such as maths, English, history and geography, with mechanical drawing and metalwork. In the second year there were more specialised subjects, such as machine construction, mechanics, magnetism and electricity and building instruction.

==== Enfield Technical College and Junior Technical School (1918–1944) ====
The Trade School became the Junior Technical School after World War One. The Institute was extended in 1924 but the demand for day and evening courses required even greater expansion. In 1936 a 39-acre site in nearby Queensway was acquired. Building work commenced in 1938, and although it was not completed for several years due to the war, the Institute, now called the Enfield Technical College, together with the Junior Technical School, moved onto the new site in 1941. The College played an important role in fulfilling the national demand for trained technicians in the services and factories during World War Two.

After the war, with another name change to Enfield College of Technology, there was continued expansion, with recognition in 1959 from London University for courses leading to external degrees in engineering. In 1967, the college was reorganised into faculties for arts and technology acquiring more premises at Capel Manor and the rebuilt former Technical Institute in Ponders End. In 1973 it became part of Middlesex Polytechnic (later Middlesex University) until the University moved out of the area in 2008

==== Junior Technical School to Secondary School (1944–1987) ====
The Junior Technical School meanwhile followed a different path and left the Queensway site in 1962 to new buildings in nearby Collinwood Avenue, the site of the present Enfield Centre although for a short period prior to this part of the school occupied some single level classrooms in the grounds of nearby Suffolks School in Brick Lane, Enfield Highway. It became the Ambrose Fleming technical grammar school for boys. Dr Ambrose Fleming, after whom the school was named, carried out research at the Ponders End Edison Swan factory which led to the diode lamp and the invention of the thermionic valve, a vital early component of radio and television. The main bias of the school was Applied Science and Technology, as well as general education, and it took boys from 11 to 18, leading to examinations in GCE O and A levels and Royal Society of Arts qualifications. The school was reorganised as a comprehensive school for boys and girls in 1967. It increased in size, and new buildings were added in Collingwood Avenue in the 1970s. Then with falling rolls due to a decline in the school age population, Ambrose Fleming closed in 1987.

=== College of North East London (1990-present) ===
On 1 April 1993, like every other maintained college in the country, The College of North East London became a corporation. It ceased to be maintained by the London Borough of Haringey and became an independent institution employing over 700 staff, owning its premises and funded by government via the Further Education Funding Council. During the summer of 1993 major refurbishment took place. The Department of Environmental Health and Public administration moved to Bounds Green centre, Art and Design moved to Muswell Hill Centre and the Department of Business and Computing Studied was concentrated at Tottenham Centre. The Hairdressing and Beauty Therapy salons were refurbished and new computer suites created in the Tower Block.

In 1997, the Tottenham Centre celebrated its centenary and in 2000, completed a new entrance and ground floor extension named the Centenary Building.

Enfield Further Education College moved onto the site and in August 2009 merged with the College of North East London (CONEL) to form the College of Haringey, Enfield and North East London.

== External reviews ==
Following a 2014 inspection, an excellent Ofsted report awarded the college an overall Grade 2 – 'Good', which included Grade 1 – 'Outstanding' for Leadership and Management. The college is a member of the Collab Group of high-performing further-education institutions.

== Notable alumni ==
- Bambos Charalambous - Labour MP for Enfield Southgate, 2017-
- Bernie Grant MP – Labour MP for Tottenham, 1987–2000
- Audley Harrison – Boxer
- Robert Boyce – Footballer
- Garth Crooks – Footballer for Stoke City F.C. and Tottenham Hotspur F.C.
- Jessie Wallace – EastEnders Actress
- MC Shystie – MOBO Award-nominated rapper-songwriter and actress
