= Mardenborough =

Mardenborough is a surname. Notable people with the surname include:

- Jann Mardenborough (born 1991), English racing driver
- Steve Mardenborough (born 1964), English footballer
