= Aaron Davis =

Aaron or Arron Davis may refer to:

- Aaron Davis (boxer) (born 1967), American boxer
- Aaron Davis (basketball) (born 1979), American basketball player
- Arron Davis (born 1972), English footballer
- Bugzy Malone (born 1990), English rapper, real name Aaron Davis
- Aaron Davis, character in Latter Days
- Prowler (Aaron Davis), a Marvel Comics character

== See also ==
- Aaron Davies (disambiguation)
- Aaron Davey (born 1983), Australian footballer
