= Chris Fry =

Chris Fry may refer to:

- Chris Fry (musician), musician in the Welsh band Magenta
- Chris Fry (footballer) (born 1969), Welsh former footballer
