= Aaron Davies =

Aaron or Arron Davies may refer to:

- Aaron Michael Davies, American actor
- Arron Davies, Welsh footballer
- Aaron Davies (producer) of Dogstar (TV series)
- Aaron Davies, character in Payback Season

== See also ==
- Aaron Davis (disambiguation)
- Aaron Davey, Australian rules footballer
