= Gary Culling =

English footballer

Personal information
- Full name: Gary Culling
- Date of birth: 6 April 1972 (age 54)
- Place of birth: Braintree, England
- Position: Defender

Senior career*
Years	Team	Apps	(Gls)
- Braintree Town
1994	Colchester United	2	(0)
- Braintree Town
Total		2	(0)
- * Club domestic league appearances and goals

Gary Culling (born 6 April 1972) is an English former footballer who played in the Football League as a defender for Colchester United.

== Career ==
Culling, born in Braintree joined Colchester United briefly in 1994 from his hometown club Braintree Town. He made two appearances in the Football League for the U's, making his debut in the opening game of the 1994–95 season, a 3–1 home defeat to Torquay United. His final game came one week later in a 2–0 away defeat to Mansfield Town. He also started in a 2–0 League Cup defeat to Brentford between his two league appearances. Culling returned to Braintree Town after leaving Colchester.
