= Hayes & Yeading United F.C. =

Association football club in London, England

Coordinates: 51°30′29″N 0°23′41″W

Hayes & Yeading United FC
- Full name: Hayes & Yeading United Football Club
- Nickname: United
- Founded: 18 May 2007; 19 years ago
- Ground: Skyex Community Stadium, Hayes, Middlesex
- Capacity: 3,000
- Chairman: Gurdev Jassi
- Manager: Jamie Tompkins
- League: Isthmian League South Central Division
- 2025–26: Isthmian League South Central Division, 9th of 22
Home colours	Away colours

Hayes & Yeading United Football Club is an association football club based in Hayes, in the London Borough of Hillingdon, England. The club was formed in 2007 from a merger of Hayes Football Club (founded in 1909) and Yeading Football Club (founded in 1960). It currently competes in the Isthmian League South Central Division and plays its home matches at the Skyex Community Stadium.

== History ==
Hayes & Yeading United Football Club was formed on 18 May 2007 after Conference South clubs Hayes F.C. and Yeading F.C. merged. The club's badge features the Middlesex crest and the colours from both the former sides; the emblem also features the motto Porro Simul: Latin for forward together.

They played their first season in the Conference South in 2007–08 as both former teams did the previous season, registering a 13th-place finish, in the FA Cup they reached the Fourth Qualifying Round, and in the FA Trophy they were knocked out in the First Round. In their second season, 2008–09, they finished fourth, securing a place in the play-offs; they beat Eastleigh 6–4 on aggregate in the semi-final coming back from 4–2 down in the first leg (after being 4–0 down just after half-time). In the play-off final they defeated Hampton & Richmond 3–2 thanks to an opener from Scott Fitzgerald and a brace from Steven Gregory, which brought them back from 2–1 down. This secured a place in the Conference National for the following season, in the FA Cup they were once again knocked out in the Fourth Qualifying Round, however they reached the Second Round of the FA Trophy.

Their first season at the top tier of non-league was a success; whilst many had tipped them for the drop they survived quite comfortably in the end and were in with a chance of a top-half finish until April, when a bad late run of form saw them slide to 17th place at the season's end. For the third consecutive season they were eliminated in the Fourth Qualifying Round of the FA Cup, whilst they lost out in the First Round of the FA Trophy. The 2009–10 season was the merged club's first at the highest level of non-league football. Hayes previously spent six years at this level before their relegation in 2002, while Yeading had not competed at this level before.

For the 2010–11 season, Hayes & Yeading turned fully professional. They reached the final of the Middlesex Senior Cup, where they lost 2–1 to Staines Town. In this season Hayes & Yeading also reached the First Round Proper of the FA Cup, playing against League 1 Wycombe Wanderers; the club lost 2–1 to a stoppage-time winner from Gareth Ainsworth. The tie was played at Church Road in front of a crowd of 1,426. They once again failed to progress beyond the First Round of the FA Trophy. On 19 April 2011 Hayes & Yeading played their last match at Church Road, beating Gateshead 3–1; despite having spent most of the season in and around the bottom four, this proved enough to allow them to finish 16th in their fourth season, representing a continuous improvement in final league positions since the merger. Hayes & Yeading began a groundshare at Kingfield Stadium, home of Woking, while a new stand was built on the site of Yeading's old ground, The Warren.

On 28 May 2011 Garry Haylock resigned as the first team manager of Hayes & Yeading United, and on 16 June 2011 Nas Bashir was appointed the new manager. In the 2011–2012 season, whilst playing at Kingfield, consistently poor league form meant that the club was relegated back into the Conference South, despite beating the odds to win a relegation six-pointer at Lincoln City, registering a 21st-place finish. They failed to repeat the previous season's FA Cup success, falling in the Fourth Qualifying Round, whilst for the third consecutive season they were eliminated in the First Round of the FA Trophy.

On 4 February 2013 Nas Bashir left the club by mutual consent, with Director of Football Tony O'Driscoll taking temporary charge of first-team affairs before his permanent appointment was confirmed on 25 February 2013. Following a 7–1 away defeat to relegation rivals Staines Town on 4 April, O'Driscoll resigned to retake his role as Director of Football; first team coaches Tristan Lewis and Delroy Preddie were appointed to take charge as joint managers for the remaining six games of the season. Hayes & Yeading registered their lowest-ever league finish, clinching 17th place in the Conference South. Their poor cup form continued, as they lost out once again in the Fourth Qualifying Round of the FA Cup, and their below-par FA Trophy form continued as, for the fourth consecutive season, they were knocked out in the First Round of the FA Trophy.

On 9 May 2013 the club announced Phil Babb (former defender for Republic of Ireland, Bradford City, Coventry City, Liverpool, Sporting CP and Sunderland) as their new manager.

Hayes & Yeading United were relegated at the end of the 2013–14 season, but because of Hereford United's expulsion from the Conference Premier, both Hayes & Yeading and Chester earned relegation reprieves. The club's cup fortunes continued to stagnate: they were knocked out in the Second Qualifying Round of the FA Cup and for the fifth consecutive season lost out in the First Round of the FA Trophy.

In the 2014–15 season, Hayes & Yeading narrowly avoided relegation, finishing 19th despite a promising start to the campaign, winning their two opening games. Their woeful cup form persisted with their second consecutive Second Qualifying Round exit in the FA Cup, and remarkably, for the sixth season in a row, they were knocked out in the First Round of the FA Trophy.

The 2015–16 season saw the club's worst ever league campaign: they finished second from bottom in the National League South despite the reappointment of Garry Haylock as manager, resulting in relegation to the Southern Football League Premier Division. For the third consecutive season the club were knocked out of the FA Cup in the Second Qualifying Round, and their very poor FA Trophy form continued: they failed even to reach the First Round, by losing in the Third Qualifying Round.

Former Oxford United coach Mickey Lewis took the manager's reins for the 2016–17 season in the Southern League, but dropped down to youth team duties in October after a poor run of form. Paul Hughes and Ritchie Hanlon were appointed as joint managers in November, joining from Kings Langley. In the cups, Hayes & Yeading were knocked out of the FA Cup by Worthing in the 2nd Qualifying round, while their FA Trophy hopes were dashed at the first hurdle by Hitchin Town. They were then relegated from the 2016–17 Southern League Premier Division – to complete their 3rd relegation in 5 seasons – despite winning the Southern League Challenge Cup at St Ives Town on penalties. In their first season at Step 4 of the football pyramid playing in the Southern League Eastern Division, the club narrowly missed out on automatic promotion scoring 103 goals in 42 games. A third-place finish saw them qualify for the Play-offs but they lost in the semi-final by a single goal to Cambridge City At the end of the 2017–18 season the club were transferred to the South Central Division of the Isthmian League. After leading the Division for much of the season they secured the club's first title as a merged club with three games still to play, once again topping 100 league goals to win the Isthmian League South Central Division.

== Ground ==
Main stand at the SkyEx Community Stadium

The club initially played at Hayes's former ground, Church Road. This was sold to fund the demolition and building of a new ground at Yeading's former home, The Warren. Church Road closed in 2011, and the club spent many years ground sharing with Woking (2011–14) and Maidenhead United (2014–16) as construction of the new ground took longer than anticipated.

The SkyEx Community Stadium opened in 2016. Safety concerns saw the ground close temporarily, and the club spent the remainder of the 2016–17 season sharing at Beaconsfield Town, before moving in permanently at the start of the 2017–18 season.

The Apple TV+ comedy series Ted Lasso uses the stadium to depict the training ground and offices of fictional Premier League team A.F.C. Richmond.

== Players ==
=== First-team squad ===
As of 25 November 2023

Note: Flags indicate national team as defined under FIFA eligibility rules; some limited exceptions apply. Players may hold more than one non-FIFA nationality.

No.	Pos.	Nation	Player
1	GK		Jacob Adams
2	DF	ENG	Cole Brown
3	DF	ENG	Jack Williams
4	MF	ENG	Sanmi Odeulsi
5	DF		Marvel Ekpiteta
6	DF	VGB	Jerry Wiltshire
7	MF		Jamie Hanlon
8	MF		Omar Rowe
9	FW		Charles Hagan
10	MF	MLT	Luke Gambin
11	FW		Ben Heath
12	FW	NGR	Ayo Fanyian
14	DF		Paul Field
16	MF		Ronan Silva
17	MF		Amos Nasha
18	DF		Luke Warner-Eley
19	FW		Steve Ngunga
20	FW		Michael Fernandes
—	DF		Tarik Moore-Azille
—	DF	ENG	Lewis Kinsella
—	FW		Norman Wabo

== Non-playing staff ==
As of 22 June 2026

Position	Staff
Manager	Jamie Tompkins
Assistant Manager	Delroy Preddie
Coach	Christian Ferreira
Physio	Harsh Chauhan

Source: https://www.hyufc.com/club-contact/l

== Records ==
- Best FA Cup performance: First round, 2010–11, 2019–20, 2021–22
- Best FA Trophy performance: Second round, 2008–09

== Honours ==
- Conference South
  - Play-off winners: 2008–09
- Isthmian League
  - South Central Division champions: 2018–19
- Southern League
  - Challenge Cup winners: 2016–17
- Middlesex Senior Cup
  - Winners: 2022–23
  - Runners-up: 2010–11
