= Nicky Haydon =

English footballer (born 1978)

Personal information
- Full name: Nicholas Haydon
- Date of birth: 10 August 1978 (age 48)
- Place of birth: Barking, London, England
- Height: 1.75 m (5 ft 9 in)
- Positions: Defender; midfielder

Youth career
- 1995–1997: Colchester United

Senior career*
Years	Team	Apps	(Gls)
1997–1999	Colchester United	45	(2)
1999–2000	Kettering Town	7	(0)
2000	Leyton Orient	0	(0)
2000–2001	Heybridge Swifts		
2001	Chelmsford City		
2001–2002	Heybridge Swifts	35	(0)
2002–2003	Braintree Town		
2002-2005	Wivenhoe Town	86	(5)
- * Club domestic league appearances and goals

Nicholas Haydon (born 10 August 1978) is an English former footballer who played in the Football League as a defender or as a midfielder for Colchester United.

== Career ==
Born in Barking, London, Haydon signed for Colchester United as an apprentice and broke into the first team at the end of the 1996–97 season. He made his debut on 3 May 1997 in a 4–2 away win over Barnet, coming on as a substitute for Adam Locke after 81 minutes. He scored five minutes after coming on, one of only two goals for the club. He made a further 44 appearances for the first team, scoring his second and final goal in a 4–2 away victory at Wrexham on 15 August 1998. His final appearance for the club came on 15 January 1999 in a 3–1 home defeat against Wrexham.

Haydon was released by Colchester in the summer of 1999, joining up with Norwich City on trial in July and impressing in reserve games with Arsenal and Ipswich Town. Manager Bruce Rioch decided not to sign Haydon, and instead signed a short-term deal with Leyton Orient where he failed to make an appearance. Haydon then signed for Conference side Kettering Town, He made seven appearances for Kettering between August and September 1999

After leaving Kettering, Haydon returned to Essex to play for Heybridge Swifts in the Isthmian League. He was placed on the transfer-list in January 2001 by the club and signed for Chelmsford City in February, before rejoining Swifts again in September 2001. By the summer of 2002, Haydon was on the move again, this time to Braintree Town, spending one season with the club. He signed for Wivenhoe Town in early 2003. In the summer of 2003, Haydon was appointed player-coach of Wivenhoe.
