= Pamelia Dickinson Mann =

Pioneer and hotel operator

Pamelia Dickinson Mann (née Dickinson c.1800 – November 4, 1840) was a pioneer and hotel operator.

== Early life ==
Pamelia Dickinson Mann was born circa 1800. Flournoy "Nimrod" Hunt, her first son, was born around 1817. She gave birth to her second son, Samuel Ezekiel W. Allen, early in 1826 while in Frankfort, Kentucky. She came to Texas in 1834 by way of Vicksburg, Mississippi.

== Gone to Texas ==
By the time she arrived in Texas, Pamelia was married to Marshall Mann. The two ran a boarding house at Washington-on-the-Brazos, the site of the Texas Constitutional Convention in March 1836. After the convention, she traveled to another residence in San Felipe de Austin, but joined other Texans fleeing from Mexican troops in the Runaway Scrape. During this event, which included General Sam Houston and the entire Texas Army traveling east, Houston appropriated Mann's team of oxen to pull heavy military equipment. Mann planned to take the Nacogdoches Road, leading northeast, but the Army took a path in another direction toward Harrisburg. She confronted Houston, unhitched the equipment from the wagon, and reclaimed her oxen. Nobody in the Texas Army stopped her.

After the Texian victory at the Battle of San Jacinto, the new government convened at a temporary capital in Brazoria, Texas, on the Brazos River. The Manns ran a boarding house there in late-1836. The Texas Congress selected the yet unformed town of Houston as its next capital, effective for the next session of congress scheduled for May 1837. The Manns abandoned their boarding house and departed for Houston on 16 January 1837. Mann recruited two of her boarders to move to Houston and work as carpenters, both of whom joined the Mann family on part of the trip. She used the journey as a means of acquiring additional food. She had already laden her wagons with bedding, food, and whiskey from the old house, and accumulated dairy and poultry along the way. Her caravan of two wagons and eight oxen took three weeks to complete the fifty-mile trip to Houston. One of her boarders, Robert P. Boyce, a Texas veteran and a carpenter, contracted to build her new hotel in Houston. The hotel was located at the corner of Milam and Congress, facing the main public square, now known as Market Square.

Mann opened Mansion House in May 1837. The two-story hotel had a double-gallery, and a reception area with furnishings highlighted by a sofa and cherry table. Just as she had boarded many distinguished guests at her house in Washington-on-the-Brazos, Mansion House housed and boarded many persons of similar standing. She feted four Tonkawa chiefs. She also provided lodging to Levi L. Laurens, who falsely accused Dr. Chauncey Goodrich of stealing $1,000, then killed him in a duel. Her husband Marshall, who had acted as a business partner for Mansion House, died on 4 October 1838.

Mann was indicted for forgery in December 1838, which was a capital offense in the Republic of Texas. Despite representation in court by the firm of (Sam) Houston and (John) Birdall, a jury convicted Mann on May 21, 1839, while appealing for leniency. Three days later Judge Benjamin C. Franklin scheduled her execution for June 27, but President Mirabeau Lamar issued a pardon on May 25. According to Andrew Forest Muir, this was probably a false conviction as Mann "could not sign her own name." This was not her only involvement with legal proceedings. Including criminal and civil cases, she was involved in more court cases in Harris County, Texas over a four-year period than any other person during that time.

== Death and legacy ==
Mann was stricken by yellow fever and died on November 4, 1840. She left an estate of over $40,000. Her estate included the Mansion House, the Houston Stables, several city lots, and rural land. Her son Flournoy Hunt was appointed to settle the estate, but died before all business was completed.
