= Johnson Hippolyte =

English footballer (born 1964)

Personal information
- Date of birth: 9 June 1964 (age 62)
- Positions: Winger; striker

Senior career*
Years	Team	Apps	(Gls)
1991–1993	Wealdstone	58	(15)
1993–1995	Yeading		
1995–1996	Dulwich Hamlet		
1997–1998	Aldershot Town	25	(12)
1998–1999	Hampton & Richmond Borough	22	(8)
1999–2000	Chesham United	13	(3)
2000–2006	Yeading		
2006–2010	Maidenhead United	1	(0)

Managerial career
- 2001–2006: Yeading (player-manager)
- 2006–2015: Maidenhead United
- 2016–2018: Staines Town
- * Club domestic league appearances and goals

Johnson Hippolyte (born 9 June 1964) is an English former semi-professional footballer, who was most recently manager of Staines Town, having been a player-manager at Yeading, and manager at Maidenhead United from 2006 to 2015. He is commonly known by the nickname Drax, on account of his Dracula-style teeth.

During his playing career, he has had spells at Hampton & Richmond, Aldershot Town, Dulwich Hamlet, Chesham United, Chertsey Town, Wealdstone, Chalfont St Peter, Uxbridge and Hounslow.

He began coaching at Chesham and then became joint manager alongside Nas Bashir at Yeading. He took sole control at The Warren in December 2001, and silverware followed with an Isthmian League Cup win in 2003. This was followed by back to back Championship titles as Yeading swiftly moved up the Isthmian League and into the Conference South.

His reputation as manager of Yeading increased with the prestigious FA Cup tie of Newcastle United in the third round of the 2004–05 FA Cup, which was held at Queens Park Rangers' Loftus Road.

He brought FA Cup glory to Maidenhead almost as soon as he arrived at York Road, taking the club to a first round appearance for the first time in 25 years, he then set about winning promotion at the first attempt which was achieved via the playoffs following a late season run of victories. In April 2008, he won the Conference South Manager of the Month award for an unbeaten run which saved the Magpies from relegation. Twelve months later, he led them to their highest ever league finish of sixth place in the Conference South. On 21 October 2011, Hippolyte signed a new contract to remain in charge at York Road until May 2014.

== Personal life ==
Born in England, Hippolyte is of Saint Lucian descent.
