= Dale Roberts (footballer, born 1956) =

British footballer

Personal information
- Date of birth: 8 October 1956
- Place of birth: Newcastle upon Tyne, England
- Date of death: 5 February 2003 (aged 46)
- Place of death: Ipswich, England
- Position: Centre-half

Youth career
- 197?–1974: Ipswich Town

Senior career*
Years	Team	Apps	(Gls)
1974–1980	Ipswich Town	18	(0)
1979	→ Atlanta Chiefs (loan)	14	(0)
1980–1986	Hull City	182	(?)
1986–1987	North Ferriby United	?	(?)
1987–1988	Bridlington Town	?	(?)
Total		214	(0)

International career
1975	England Youth	1	(0)

Managerial career
- 1989–1993: Hull City (youth team coach)
- 1993–1994: Ayr United (assistant manager)
- 1994: Colchester United (assistant manager)
- 1994–1995: Colchester United (caretaker)
- 1995–2003: Ipswich Town (assistant manager)
- * Club domestic league appearances and goals

Dale Roberts (8 October 1956 – 5 February 2003), was a British football player, a centre-half who started his playing career at Ipswich Town

Roberts was born in Newcastle upon Tyne.

== Playing career ==
Roberts joined Ipswich Town as an apprentice and was part of the team that won the FA Youth Cup in 1973 and 1975. He made his first team debut for Ipswich on 28 December 1974 against Birmingham City. He was at Ipswich at the same time as other centre-half players such as Kevin Beattie, Allan Hunter, Russell Osman and Terry Butcher and therefore opportunities were limited. He played 24 games before he moved on to Hull City for £60,000 in February 1980. During the 1982–83 season, he formed a partnership with Peter Skipper in defence, making 43 appearances, as Hull won promotion from the Fourth Division. He was on the losing side in the 1984 Associate Members' Cup final and the following season he was involved in Hull's promotion to the Second Division. He made 182 appearances for Hull before retiring through injury to his pelvis. He later had spells with non-league North Ferriby United and Bridlington Town.

== Coaching career ==
Roberts became a driving instructor before starting his coaching career at Hull City, where he was reunited with manager Colin Appleton who made him a youth team coach. In 1993, he joined up with long-time friend George Burley at Ayr United as an assistant manager before the pair moved to Colchester United where he became caretaker manager in 1994 after Burley left abruptly to join Ipswich. In 1995, he returned to Ipswich as George Burley's assistant manager. Many Ipswich supporters share the memory of Roberts and Burley dancing on the Wembley pitch just after Martijn Reuser had scored the fourth goal in the play-off final. Roberts went on to lead the reserves to the FA Premier Reserve League (South) Championship title in the 2001–02 season.

== Death ==
He died on 5 February 2003, at home in Ipswich, aged 46, after a two-year battle against cancer.

== Managerial statistics ==
Team	Nat	From	To	Record				
Team	Nat	From	To	P	W	D	L	Win %
Colchester United (Caretaker)	(England)	24 December 1994	12 January 1995	5	1	1	3	20.0

== Honours ==
Hull City

- Associate Members' Cup runner-up: 1983–84

Individual

- Ipswich Town Hall of Fame: Inducted 2013
