= Leighton Allen =

English footballer

Personal information
- Full name: Leighton Gary Allen
- Date of birth: 22 November 1973 (age 52)
- Place of birth: Brighton, England
- Height: 6 ft 0 in (1.83 m)
- Position: Forward

Youth career
- Wimbledon

Senior career*
Years	Team	Apps	(Gls)
1992–1994	Wimbledon	0	(0)
1994	Gillingham	0	(0)
1994	Colchester United	2	(0)
- Ringmer
- Saltdean United
- Lewes
- Crawley Town
- Worthing
- Peacehaven & Telscombe
Total		2	(0)
- * Club domestic league appearances and goals

Leighton Gary Allen (born 22 November 1973) is an English former footballer who played as a forward in the Football League for Colchester United. He was also on the books at Premier League club Wimbledon, but failed to make a first-team appearance.

== Career ==
Born in Brighton, Allen was on the books at Premier League club Wimbledon for four years where he broke Arsenal's Kevin Campbells goalscoring record of 81 goals in two years for their youth team and went on to sign a two year professional contract in 1992, he was released in the summer of 1994. Unable to break into the first team, he joined Gillingham for a short stint until he was signed by Colchester United manager George Burley. Allen made just two Football League appearances for the club, the first as a replacement for Paul Abrahams in a 1–0 win against Hartlepool United at Layer Road on 10 September 1994, and in the second he came on for Chris Fry in a 3–2 away victory at Darlington on 24 September. Shortly after this, Allen was released from Colchester as Burley built up his squad.

Following his brief Football League stint, Allen returned to his south-coast roots to play for Ringmer, Saltdean United, Lewes, Crawley Town, Worthing and Peacehaven & Telscombe.
