= 1990 Football League play-offs =

Football League play-offs
- Season: 1989–90
- Champions: Swindon Town (Second Division); Notts County (Third Division); Cambridge United (Fourth Division)
- Matches played: 15
- Goals scored: 28 (1.87 per match)
- Biggest home win: Chesterfield 4–0 Stockport (Fourth Division)
- Biggest away win: N'castle 0–2 Sunderland (Second Division); Stockport 0–2 Chesterfield (Fourth Division); Maidstone 0–2 Cambridge (Fourth Division)
- Highest scoring: Chesterfield 4–0 Stockport (4 goals)
- Highest attendance: 72,873 – Sunderland v Swindon (Second Division final)
- Lowest attendance: 5,538 – Maidstone v Cambridge (Fourth Division semi-final)
- Average attendance: 19,433

The Football League play-offs for the 1989–90 season were held in May 1990, with the finals taking place at Wembley Stadium. The play-off semi-finals were also played over two legs and were contested by the teams who finished in 3rd, 4th, 5th and 6th place in the Football League Second Division, the 4th, 5th, 6th and 7th placed teams in the Football League Third Division and the 3rd, 4th, 5th and 6th place teams in the Football League Fourth Division table. The winners of the semi-finals progressed through to the finals, with the winner of these matches gaining promotion for the following season. The 1990 play-offs finals were the first to be played at Wembley Stadium.

== Background ==
The Football League play-offs have been held every year since 1987. They take place for each division following the conclusion of the regular season and are contested by the four clubs finishing below the automatic promotion places. For the first three seasons the final was played over two legs but this was changed to a single match at Wembley Stadium from 1990.

== Second Division ==
Pos	Team	Pld	W	D	L	GF	GA	GD	Pts
3	Newcastle United	46	22	14	10	80	55	+25	80
4	Swindon Town	46	20	14	12	79	59	+20	74
5	Blackburn Rovers	46	19	17	10	74	59	+15	74
6	Sunderland	46	20	14	12	70	64	+6	74

=== Semi-finals ===
First leg

13 May 1990
12:00

Sunderland	0–0	Newcastle United

Roker Park, Sunderland
Attendance: 26,641
Referee: Vic Callow

13 May 1990
15:00

Blackburn Rovers	1–2	Swindon Town
Kennedy		White; Foley

Ewood Park, Blackburn
Attendance: 15,636
Referee: Terry Holbrook

Second leg

16 May 1990
19:45

Newcastle United	0–2	Sunderland
		Gates 13'; Gabbiadini 86'

St James' Park, Newcastle upon Tyne
Attendance: 32,199
Referee: George Courtney

Sunderland won 2–0 on aggregate.

16 May 1990
19:45

Swindon Town	2–1	Blackburn Rovers
Shearer; White		Gayle

County Ground, Swindon
Attendance: 12,416
Referee: John Martin

Swindon Town won 4–2 on aggregate.

=== Final ===
28 May 1990
15:00

Sunderland	0–1	Swindon Town
		Bennett 25' (o.g.)

Wembley Stadium, London
Attendance: 72,873
Referee: John Martin

=== Demotion ===
Although they won the promotion play-offs, Swindon Town did not compete in the First Division during the following season. During the 1989–90 season the club was charged with 36 breaches of Football League regulations – 35 of which related to illegal payments made to players between 1985 and 1989.

A hearing to decide the club's fate was scheduled for 4 May – before the play-offs began – but this was postponed on legal advice just days before it was due when Swindon chairman Brian Hillier, club accountant Vince Farrar and former team manager Lou Macari were charged by police for "intent to defraud Inland Revenue by making payments without deducting tax or NI". (In July 1992 both Hillier and Farrar were found guilty of these charges, while Macari was cleared).

Hillier and Macari had already been punished by the FA in February 1990 for their involvement in a £6,500 bet being placed on Swindon losing to Newcastle United in a tie during the 1987–88 FA Cup. The bet was successful and netted £4,000 winnings. As this activity ran counter to FA rules that forbid any bets by club officials or players on their own team, both were found guilty. Hillier was given a six-month suspension from football, but after he (unsuccessfully) appealed, the FA increased it to three years. Macari was fined £1,000 (upheld after his own appeal), and Swindon Town given a £7,500 fine.

At a Football League hearing on 7 June, Swindon pleaded guilty to all 36 charges against them and admitted a further twenty. The league decreed that the club would be denied promotion and instead demoted to the Third Division. Six days later, it was announced that losing play-off finalists Sunderland would be instead promoted to the First Division. This was controversial as Newcastle felt that as they had finished third, three places above bitter rivals Sunderland, they should have been promoted instead. The FA's decision stood and Sunderland were promoted.

Swindon launched a High Court appeal against the Football League's double demotion, claiming it to be "harsh, oppressive and disproportionate to previous penalties". However, within days they dropped this action and instead appealed directly to the FA. On 2 July an FA Appeal Panel reduced the punishment to the club simply remaining in the Second Division; Tranmere Rovers – the losing play-off finalists in the Third Division – who were to have replaced Swindon in the second level were therefore denied promotion.

== Third Division ==
Pos	Team	Pld	W	D	L	GF	GA	GD	Pts
3	Notts County	46	25	12	9	73	53	+20	87
4	Tranmere Rovers	46	23	11	12	86	49	+37	80
5	Bury	46	21	11	14	70	49	+21	74
6	Bolton Wanderers	46	18	15	13	59	48	+11	69

=== Semi-finals ===
First leg

13 May 1990
15:00

Bolton Wanderers	1–1	Notts County
Philliskirk (pen.)		Lund

Burnden Park, Bolton
Attendance: 15,108

13 May 1990
15:00

Bury	0–0	Tranmere Rovers

Gigg Lane, Bury
Attendance: 7,019

Second leg

16 May 1990
19:30

Tranmere Rovers	2–0	Bury
Malkin; Muir

Prenton Park, Birkenhead
Attendance: 10,343

Tranmere Rovers won 2–0 on aggregate.

16 May 1990
19:45

Notts County	2–0	Bolton Wanderers
Johnson; Bartlett

Meadow Lane, Nottingham
Attendance: 15,200

Notts County won 3–1 on aggregate.

=== Final ===
27 May 1990
15:00

Notts County	2–0	Tranmere Rovers
Johnson 30'; Short 62'

Wembley Stadium, London
Attendance: 29,252
Referee: Roger Milford

== Fourth Division ==
Pos	Team	Pld	W	D	L	GF	GA	GD	Pts
4	Stockport County	46	21	11	14	68	62	+6	74
5	Maidstone United	46	22	7	17	77	61	+16	73
6	Cambridge United	46	21	10	15	76	66	+10	73
7	Chesterfield	46	19	14	13	63	50	+13	71

=== Semi-finals ===
First leg

13 May 1990
12:00

Cambridge United	1–1	Maidstone United
Cheetham (pen.)		Gall

Abbey Stadium, Cambridge
Attendance: 8,277

13 May 1990
12:00

Chesterfield	4–0	Stockport County
Plummer; Ryan

Saltergate, Chesterfield
Attendance: 7,264

Second leg

16 May 1990
19:30

Stockport County	0–2	Chesterfield
		Plummer; Chiedozie

Edgeley Park, Stockport
Attendance: 7,339

Chesterfield won 6–0 on aggregate.

16 May 1990
20:00

Maidstone United	0–2 (a.e.t.)	Cambridge United
		Dublin; Cheetham (pen.)

Watling Street, Dartford
Attendance: 5,538

Cambridge United won 3–1 on aggregate.

=== Final ===
26 May 1990
15:00

Cambridge United	1–0	Chesterfield
Dublin 77'

Wembley Stadium, London
Attendance: 26,404
Referee: George Courtney
