= Nas Bashir =

English footballer

Personal information
- Full name: Naseem Bashir
- Date of birth: 12 September 1969 (age 57)
- Place of birth: Amersham, England
- Position: Midfielder

Team information
- Current team: Beaconsfield SYCOB (Director of Football)

Senior career*
Years	Team	Apps	(Gls)
1988–1990	Reading	3	(1)
1990–?	Slough Town	15	(2)
	Aylesbury United	?	(?)

Managerial career
- 2011–2013: Hayes & Yeading United
- 2015: Beaconsfield SYCOB (caretaker)
- * Club domestic league appearances and goals

Naseem "Nas" Bashir (born 12 September 1969) is an English former footballer.

== Coaching career ==
Bashir was Assistant Academy Manager at Reading between 2001 and 2009. Whilst at the club, he gained his UEFA Pro Licence and worked with Stuart Pearce coaching the England U21 side. He was also responsible for running courses at Charters School and the John Madejski Academy.

After founding the FAB academy based at Bisham Abbey, Bashir moved to Beaconsfield SYCOB in the summer of 2014 as Director of Football/General Manager, alongside Andy Hurley and Lee Togwell who assumed the manager and player/coach roles respectively.

Bashir stepped in as manager for the final weeks of the season following the departure of Gary Meakin in March 2015 on a caretaker basis. After stepping aside as caretaker manager, Bashir assumed his previous role as Director of Football.

== Managerial statistics ==
As of 4 February 2013

Managerial record by team and tenure
Team	From	To	Record					Ref
Team	From	To	P	W	D	L	Win %	Ref
Hayes & Yeading United	16 June 2011	4 February 2013	78	23	14	41	29.5	
Total			78	23	14	41	29.5	—
