= Robert Prettyman Boyce =

Republic of Texas and American businessman

Robert Prettyman Boyce (1814/1816 – 1888) was a member of Texas Army, a businessman, and a local municipal official in Houston.

== Early life ==
Boyce was born in 1814 or 1816 in the vicinity of Cincinnati. His father abandoned his mother and he ran away from his mother around the age of ten. He started apprenticing as a carpenter about four years later in Cincinnati. He reconciled with his mother before leaving the Queen City as a journeyman carpenter. He stayed in Natchez, Mississippi before accepting contract carpentry work on the St. Charles Hotel in New Orleans.

== Career ==
In April 1936, Boyce enlisted with a Texas militia organized in New Orleans by Thomas William Ward. He was one of 75 soldiers under the command of William Graham who boarded the schooner Flora bound for Texas. However, the militia missed the Battle of San Jacinto by a couple of days, and Boyce was dispatched to Goliad, Texas with other soldiers to guard the frontier from Mexico. He served in that region for six months, and was discharged with grant of 640 acres of Texas land.

In February 1837, Boyce accompanied Pamelia Dickinson Mann and Marshall Mann to Houston in a caravan that was heavily laden with food and furniture, where he built some simple dwellings, including one for President Sam Houston.

Boyce established himself in Houston as a master builder, where he also served as the City Marshall in 1850.

== Personal life ==
In 1846, Boyce married Lydia Maria De Gentilis Page, with whom he had two children before her death. In 1855, he married Mary Frances Hogan, the daughter of one of his neighbors, Sheriff James B. Hogan. This marriage produced another seven children, but only four who reached maturity.

== Death and legacy ==
Boyce died in Houston on February 16, 1888 from kidney failure. Thomas Hennessey of the Church of the Annunciation presided over the funeral service. Members of the Freemasons and Odd Fellows escorted the procession. He was buried in Glenwood Cemetery in Houston.

== Bibliography ==
- Bradley, Barrie Scardino. Improbable Metropolis: Houston's Architectural and Urban History. Austin: University of Texas Press. ISBN 978-1-4773-2019-8.
- Henson, Margaret S. (1984). "Robert P. Boyce: Nineteenth-Century Houstonian" (PDF). Houston Review. 6 (1).
- Houghton, Dorothy Knox Howe; Bradley, Barrie Scardino; Howe, Katherine S.; Blackburn, Sadie Gwin (1998). Houston's Forgotten Heritage: Landscapes, Houses, Interiors, 1824−1914. College Station, TX: Texas A&M University Press. ISBN 978-1-62349-246-5.
