= Trevor Putney =

English footballer

Personal information
- Full name: Trevor Anthony Putney
- Date of birth: 9 April 1960 (age 66)
- Place of birth: Harold Hill, England
- Height: 5 ft 10 in (1.78 m)
- Position: Midfielder

Senior career*
Years	Team	Apps	(Gls)
?–1980	Brentwood	75	
1980–1986	Ipswich Town	103	(8)
1986–1989	Norwich City	82	(9)
1989–1991	Middlesbrough	48	(1)
1991–1993	Watford	52	(2)
1993–1994	Leyton Orient	22	(2)
1994–1995	Colchester United	28	(2)
- * Club domestic league appearances and goals

Trevor Anthony Putney (born 9 April 1960) is an English former professional footballer who played as a midfielder.

== Career ==
=== Ipswich Town ===
Putney began his professional football career fairly late in life when Bobby Robson and Ipswich Town signed him from non-league Brentwood FC, and went on to make 103 appearances. He was voted the club's player of the year by the supporters in 1984 amongst the likes of Wark, Burley, Cooper, Butcher, Osman, Gates and Mariner. He then joined the small band of players who have played for both Ipswich and Norwich City, when he joined the Canaries in the summer of 1986 in a player exchange deal that saw John Deehan join Ipswich.

=== Norwich City ===
Putney spent three seasons with Norwich, making 100 appearances, and enjoying some of the club's best success, finishing 4th in the old First Division (now Premier League). A ban on English clubs playing in Europe due to the Heysel Stadium Disaster, prevented Putney and Norwich qualifying for the UEFA Cup. During the same season, a successful FA Cup run saw Norwich reach the Semi-Finals versus Everton at Villa Park. Everton ran out 1–0 winners thanks to a Pat Nevin goal - however the main headline of the day was the tragic news coming from the other Semi-Final between Liverpool and Nottingham Forest at Hillsborough where sadly 96 people lost their lives and another 766 were injured.

The success at Norwich attracted the interest from many other top flight clubs and players soon started to depart; Mike Phelan (Manchester United), Andy Townsend (Chelsea), Andy Linighan (Arsenal) and Trevor joined Middlesbrough for a fee of £300,000 in 1989.

=== Middlesbrough ===
Putney spent just two years at Middlesbrough which was hindered by a bad injury suffered in the Semi-Final win overAston Villa in the Zenith Data Systems Cup (Full Members Cup). Putney suffered breaks to his Tibia and Fibula after a late challenge from Gordon Cowans. Putney played few games after his return from injury and soon moved back down South (his home town is Romford) when he was signed by Steve Perryman for Watford FC in a swap plus cash deal, with Paul Wilkinson and Willie Falconer going the other way.

=== Watford ===
At Watford, Putney was regarding as one of the senior pros amongst the likes of Peter Nicholas, Alan Devonshire, Andy Hessenthaler and Nigel Gibbs. This was offset by the upcoming young talent such as Paul Furlong, David James and Jason Drysdale. Probably Putney's most memorable match at Watford came in their 2–1 win over First Division (now Premier League) Champions, Leeds Utd, at Vicarage Road in the third-round of the Coca-Cola Cup (Football League Cup) which saw Putney awarded the Man-of-the-Match award for keeping the likes of Strachan, Cantona, McAllister and Speed at bay at the age of 32.

=== Leyton Orient ===
After 52 league appearances for the Hornets, Glenn Roeder sold Putney to Leyton Orient, where he was rewarded with the club Captaincy by John Sitton amongst senior pros such as Gary Bellamy, Terry Howard, Glenn Cockerill and Colin West.

=== Colchester United ===
After one season and 22 league appearances at Brisbane Road, Chris Turner sent Putney on loan to Essex club Colchester United, which then became a permanent deal in 1994 playing alongside the recognized Steve Whitton and Mark Kinsella. Putney retired from professional football after leaving Colchester United after one season and 28 league appearances in 1995.

He was a midfielder with white-blonde hair.

After retirement Putney had brief spells in commentary, hospitality, radio and scouting within the professional game.

During his playing days, Putney was reputed by his footballing colleagues as a prankster.

== Honours ==
Individual

- Ipswich Town Player of the Year: 1983–84
