= Tony Dennis =

English footballer

Personal information
- Full name: John Anthony Dennis
- Date of birth: 1 December 1963 (age 62)
- Place of birth: Eton, Berkshire, England
- Position: Midfielder

Youth career
- Plymouth Argyle

Senior career*
Years	Team	Apps	(Gls)
1981–1983	Plymouth Argyle	9	(0)
1983–1984	Exeter City	4	(0)
1984–1986	Bideford	?	(?)
1986–1987	Taunton Town	?	(?)
1987–1988	Slough Town	76	(12)
1988–1993	Cambridge United	111	(10)
1993–1994	Chesterfield	10	(0)
1994–1995	Colchester United	65	(5)
1995–1997	Lincoln City	28	(2)
1997–1998	Gainsborough Trinity	14	(0)
1998	Ilkeston Town	1	(0)
- * Club domestic league appearances and goals as of 12:15, 12 May 2011

John Anthony Dennis (born 1 December 1963 in Eton, Berkshire) is a former professional footballer who played as a midfielder.

== Career ==
Dennis played for football league clubs Plymouth Argyle, Exeter City, Chesterfield, Colchester United, Lincoln City and made more than 100 appearances for Cambridge United in a career that spanned 17 years.

== Honours ==
Cambridge United

- Football League Third Division: 1990–91
