= Arron Davis =

English footballer

Personal information
- Full name: Arron Spencer Davis
- Date of birth: 11 February 1972 (age 54)
- Place of birth: Wanstead, London, England
- Position: Full-back

Youth career
- Torquay United

Senior career*
Years	Team	Apps	(Gls)
1991–1993	Torquay United	24	(0)
1993–1994	Plymouth Argyle	0	(0)
1994	→ Colchester United (loan)	4	(0)
- Dorchester Town
Total		28	(0)
- * Club domestic league appearances and goals

Arron Spencer Davis (born 11 February 1972) is an English former footballer who played in the Football League as a full-back for Torquay United and Colchester United.

== Career ==
Born in Wanstead, London, Davis joined Torquay United as a youth, progressing into the first-team to eventually make 24 Football League appearances between 1991 and 1993. He later joined Plymouth Argyle, failing to make an appearance, though in 1994 he joined Colchester United on loan, making his debut in a 2–0 away defeat to Mansfield Town on 20 August 1994 and making his final appearance on 3 September in a 1–0 win at Scarborough, totalling four appearances for the club. He later played for Dorchester Town.
