= Michael Cheetham =

English association football player

Personal information
- Date of birth: 30 June 1967 (age 59)
- Place of birth: Nijmegen, Netherlands
- Position: Midfielder

Senior career*
Years	Team	Apps	(Gls)
1987–1988	Basingstoke Town		
1988–1989	Ipswich Town	4	(0)
1989–1994	Cambridge United	132	(22)
1994–1995	Chesterfield	5	(0)
1995–1996	Colchester United	37	(3)
1996–1997	Sudbury Town		
1997–1999	Cambridge City		
1999–2007	AFC Sudbury		
- * Club domestic league appearances and goals

Michael Cheetham (born 30 June 1967) is an English retired footballer most notable for his time at Cambridge United in the early 1990s.

== Career ==
Ipswich Town manager Bobby Robson paid to buy him out of the army to enable him to start his football career at Portman Road where he went on to make 4 appearances.

After a loan spell at Cambridge United in 1989, he signed permanently at The Abbey Stadium for a fee of £50,000 in 1990 and went on to be a permanent fixture in the side that gained successive promotions to the old Division Two under controversial manager John Beck. Winger Cheetham played a total of 132 games for the club, scoring 22 goals before joining Chesterfield on a free transfer in 1994.

After just 5 appearances at Saltergate, Cheetham moved back to East Anglia with Colchester United where he ended his league career by playing a further 37 games, scoring 3 goals.

After dropping out of professional football he had spells at Cambridge City, Sudbury Town and AFC Sudbury where he had a spell as coach.

== Honours ==
Cambridge United

- Football League Third Division: 1990–91
- Football League Fourth Division play-offs: 1990
