= Robert Boyce (footballer) =

English footballer (born 1974)

Personal information
- Full name: Robert Alexander Boyce
- Date of birth: 7 January 1974 (age 52)
- Place of birth: Islington, London, England
- Height: 1.80 m (5 ft 11 in)
- Position: Midfielder

Youth career
- –: Sheffield Wednesday

Senior career*
Years	Team	Apps	(Gls)
–	Sheffield Wednesday	0	(0)
–	Stevenage Borough		
1994–1995	Enfield		
1995–1996	Colchester United	2	(0)
1996	Chelmsford City	3	(0)
1996	Aylesbury United	2	(0)
–	Wealdstone		
Total		4	(0)
- * Club domestic league appearances and goals

Robert Alexander Boyce (born 7 January 1974) is an English former footballer who played as a midfielder in the Football League for Colchester United.

== Career ==
Born in Islington, London, Boyce began his career with Sheffield Wednesday, although he made no first-team appearances for the club. He then joined Enfield and appeared for Stevenage Borough on trial prior to joining Colchester United in 1995.

Boyce made his debut for Colchester in a 2–1 victory over Cardiff City at Ninian Park on 28 October 1995, coming on as a substitute for Steve Mardenborough. His final appearance came during a 3–2 away defeat at Doncaster Rovers on 18 November 1995, again as a substitute.

Upon leaving Colchester, Boyce joined Essex neighbours Chelmsford City. In 1996, he made two substitute league appearances and played one cup game for Aylesbury United and also played for Wealdstone during the 2000–01 season.
