= Robbie Reinelt =

English footballer (born 1974)

Personal information
- Full name: Robert Squire Reinelt
- Date of birth: 11 March 1974 (age 52)
- Place of birth: Loughton, England
- Height: 5 ft 11 in (1.80 m)
- Position: Centre forward

Youth career
- Aldershot

Senior career*
Years	Team	Apps	(Gls)
1990–1992	Aldershot	5	(0)
1992–1993	Wivenhoe Town	27	(12)
1993–1995	Gillingham	52	(5)
1995–1997	Colchester United	48	(10)
1997–1998	Brighton & Hove Albion	44	(7)
1998	Leyton Orient	7	(0)
1998–1999	Stevenage Borough	18	(1)
1999	St Albans City		
1999	Braintree Town		
- Ford United
- * Club domestic league appearances and goals as of 15:01, 16 May 2011

Robert Squire Reinelt (born 11 March 1974) is an English former professional footballer. He played for Aldershot, Gillingham, Colchester United, Brighton & Hove Albion, Leyton Orient and Stevenage Borough. between 1990 and 1999.

Reinelt is best remembered for his goal that preserved Brighton's Football League status, against Hereford United in 1997.
