= Steve Whitton =

English footballer (born 1960)

Personal information
- Full name: Stephen Paul Whitton
- Date of birth: 4 December 1960 (age 65)
- Place of birth: East Ham, London, England
- Height: 6 ft 0 in (1.83 m)
- Position: Striker

Youth career
- 1977–1978: Coventry City

Senior career*
Years	Team	Apps	(Gls)
1978–1983	Coventry City	74	(21)
1980	→ Seiko SA (loan)		
1983–1986	West Ham United	39	(6)
1986	→ Birmingham City (loan)	8	(2)
1986–1989	Birmingham City	95	(28)
1989–1991	Sheffield Wednesday	32	(4)
1990	→ Halmstads BK (loan)	13	(7)
1991–1994	Ipswich Town	88	(15)
1994–1998	Colchester United	116	(21)
Total		465	(104)

Managerial career
- 1999–2003: Colchester United
- * Club domestic league appearances and goals

Stephen Paul Whitton (born 4 December 1960) is an English former footballer who played as a striker. He was born in East Ham, London.

== Career ==
In a playing career spanning 20 years (1978–1998), Whitton made more than 450 league appearances. He played in the Football League and Premier League in England, the Swedish Allsvenskan and the Hong Kong First Division League. After being forced to retire with injury he became assistant manager at Colchester United under Steve Wignall and his successor Mick Wadsworth. He went on to manage the team after Wadsworth resigned just weeks before the start of the season. He continued as manager until he left by mutual consent in early 2003.

== Managerial statistics ==
Team	From	To	Record				
Team	From	To	G	W	D	L	Win %
Colchester United	28 August 1999	29 January 2003	181	52	45	84	28.7

== Honours ==
Ipswich Town

- Football League Second Division: 1991–92

Colchester United

- Football League Trophy runner-up: 1996–97

Individual

- Colchester United Player of the Year: 1994–95
