= Ben Lewis (footballer) =

English footballer (born 1977)

Personal information
- Full name: Benjamin Lewis
- Date of birth: 22 June 1977 (age 49)
- Place of birth: Chelmsford, England
- Position: Central defender

Team information
- Current team: Margate

Senior career*
Years	Team	Apps	(Gls)
1995–1996	Colchester United	2	(0)
1997–1998	Southend United	14	(1)
1998–2000	Heybridge Swifts		
2000–2002	Chelmsford City		
2002	Grays Athletic		
2002–2004	Redbridge		
2004–2005	Bishop's Stortford		
2005–2006	St Albans City	21	(0)
2006–2007	Welling United	27	(2)
2007–2009	Maidstone United		
2009	Margate		
2009–2010	Croydon Athletic		
2010	Thamesmead Town	0	(0)
2010–2011	Brentwood Town		
- * Club domestic league appearances and goals as of 13:57, 8 December 2009 (UTC)

Benjamin Lewis (born 22 June 1977) is an English semi-professional footballer from Chelmsford, Essex, who plays for Isthmian League Division One South club Croydon Athletic.

== Football career ==
Lewis formerly played professionally for both Southend United and Colchester United, before knee problems arose and ended his professional career. Following this, he has played for non-League teams Grays Athletic, Ford United, Chelmsford City, Heybridge Swifts, Welling United, Bishop's Stortford and Maidstone United.

Lewis made his debut for Margate in a pre-season friendly against Carlisle United on 17 July 2009 in which he also made his first appearance as captain for the club. He then joined Croydon Athletic in December 2009.
