= Steve Mardenborough =

English footballer

Personal information
- Full name: Stephen Alexander Mardenborough
- Date of birth: 11 September 1964 (age 62)
- Place of birth: Birmingham, England
- Height: 5 ft 8 in (1.73 m)
- Position: Midfielder

Senior career*
Years	Team	Apps	(Gls)
1982–1983	Coventry City	0	(0)
1983–1984	Wolverhampton Wanderers	9	(1)
1984	→ Cambridge United (loan)	6	(0)
1984–1985	Swansea City	36	(7)
1985–1987	Newport County	64	(11)
1987–1988	Cardiff City	32	(1)
1988–1989	Hereford United	27	(0)
1989–1990	IFK Östersund		
1990	Cheltenham Town	15	(4)
1990–1993	Darlington	106	(18)
1993–1994	Lincoln City	21	(2)
1994	Scarborough	1	(0)
1995	Stafford Rangers	22	(4)
1995	Colchester United	12	(2)
1995	Swansea City	1	(0)
1995–1996	Newport County	5	(0)
1996	Cwmbran Town	1	(0)
1997–1999	Inter Cardiff	68	(16)
1999–2001	Aberystwyth Town	51	(15)
2001–2002	Rhayader Town	21	(7)
2002	Haverfordwest County	6	(1)
2002	Port Talbot Town	5	(1)
2002–2003	Llanelli	15	(1)
2003	Carmarthen Town	7	(1)
2003	Barry Town	1	(0)
- * Club domestic league appearances and goals

Stephen Alexander Mardenborough (born 11 September 1964) is an English former professional footballer who made more than 300 appearances in the Football League. He is the father of professional racer Jann Mardenborough. In the film based on his son's career, Gran Turismo, he was portrayed by Djimon Hounsou.

== Career ==
A much travelled player during his career, Mardenborough's first club was Coventry City but he was released after finishing his apprenticeship, joining Wolverhampton Wanderers. He struggled to make an impact on the first team. His only league goal for the club was the winner at Anfield in January 1984 against reigning champions Liverpool, who were en route to another League title as well as the 1983–84 European Cup, while Wolves would be relegated. After a loan spell at Cambridge United, Mardenborough joined Swansea City in July 1984. He was a popular figure in his single season at the club but was allowed to leave in a mass clear-out of players at the end of the year, staying in Wales to sign for Newport County.

After two seasons in Newport he joined his third Welsh club in Cardiff City. He struggled to reproduce the same form he had previously shown, scoring just once in a 3–1 win over Torquay United, and was allowed to join Hereford United after one season. After leaving Hereford he spent time playing in Sweden for IFK Östersund before returning to England with Cheltenham Town. In 1990 he signed for Darlington where he held a regular first team place for several years, playing over 100 times for the club and helping them gain promotion back into the Football League.

Leaving Darlington in 1993, he spent one year at Lincoln City before having a short spell at Colchester United and non-contract terms at Scarborough and Swansea. His second spell at Swansea would be his last in the Football League before dropping into non-league, playing in the Welsh Premier League for nearly ten years.

== Personal life ==
Mardenborough's son, Jann Mardenborough, became a professional racing driver after winning the 2011 GT Academy on the Gran Turismo series of PlayStation driving games. A film based on Jann's career, Gran Turismo, has Djimon Hounsou play Steve.

== Honours ==
Cardiff City

- Football League Fourth Division: 1987–88

Darlington

- Football League Fourth Division: 1990–91
- Football Conference: 1989–90
