= Adam Locke =

English footballer (born 1970)

Personal information
- Full name: Adam Spencer Locke
- Date of birth: 20 August 1970 (age 56)
- Place of birth: Croydon, London, England
- Height: 5 ft 10 in (1.78 m)
- Positions: Defender; midfielder

Senior career*
Years	Team	Apps	(Gls)
1988–1990	Crystal Palace	0	(0)
1990–1994	Southend United	73	(4)
1993	→ Colchester United (loan)	4	(0)
1994–1997	Colchester United	79	(8)
1997–1999	Bristol City	68	(4)
1999–2002	Luton Town	62	(5)
2002–2005	Hornchurch	38	(2)
2005–2006	Bromley	21	(0)
2006	Tooting & Mitcham United	12	(0)
2006	Whyteleafe	5	(2)
Total		345	(23)
- * Club domestic league appearances and goals

Adam Spencer Locke (born 20 August 1970) is an English retired professional footballer who played as a defender.

== Career ==
=== Southend United ===
Locke was born in Croydon, London. It was at Crystal Palace that he signed his first professional contract in June 1988. However, Locke failed to make a single first-team appearance during his time at Selhurst Park, and after two years he joined Southend United in 1990. Locke became a regular for "The Shrimpers", playing 88 games in just over four years, 19 of those appearances as a substitute, scoring 4 goals in his time at the club.

=== Colchester United ===
Locke was loaned to Colchester United in October 1993 and after 5 matches for The U's, the move was made permanent a year later. Welcomed by the Colchester supporters, who had been impressed by his performances during the loan spell, Locke spent just under three years at Layer Road, playing in 104 games and scoring eight goals.

He spent the majority of his time at Colchester as a defender, usually as a right wing-back. He enjoyed a storming start to the 1995–96 season when he scored Colchester's winner on the opening day against Plymouth Argyle – a 30-yard drive into the roof of the net, followed by two more goals against Hartlepool United in the autumn. In the 1996–97 campaign, he scored four goals, all of those coming away from home, and featuring a double strike at Exeter City. However, given the depth of midfield talent at Layer Road, he found himself in and out of the starting line up and went on the transfer list at his own request in March.

=== Bristol City ===
During August 1997, Locke left Colchester to join John Ward's Bristol City on a free transfer, the prospect of joining an arguably bigger club too good an opportunity to turn down. In the 1997–98 season, he was Bristol City's find of the season. Playing at right wing-back, he showed great commitment, and had the ability to run at the opposition. He made the position his own as the side were promoted to Division One.

=== Luton Town ===
Having not been a regular at Bristol City in his second season, he decided to leave the club under the Bosman ruling. He was snapped up by Luton Town manager Lennie Lawrence on a free transfer in August 1999, initially on a month-to-month contract. After making his debut in a disappointing away defeat to Brentford, he flourished thereafter. An experienced player in a very young side, he led by example, proving an astute signing by the Hatters manager. He scored three goals for the club. Locke played in 40 matches and, after signing numerous month-to-month deals, he was finally secured on a more permanent basis.

Locke, like Luton, had a very disappointing 2000–01 season. As the Hatters were relegated to Division Three, Locke's form suffered as a consequence and he never produced the sort of form that he had shown in the previous campaign. He started the season in the side, playing in the first game of the season, a 0–1 defeat to Notts County, but he was in and out of the side as dictated by injury and form. He still made 31 appearances in all competitions, 25 of those in the League. He also scored two goals, a volley against Wycombe Wanderers in front of the live television cameras and another at AFC Bournemouth – although both matches ended in defeat. He had, however, done enough to persuade manager Joe Kinnear that he was worthy of a place in the squad and he signed a new one-year contract during the pre-season.

Locke was merely a squad member for the Hatters, though, during the 2001–02 season and he made just three appearances in the first-team during the course of the entire season. He came on as a substitute in a 2–0 win at Carlisle United on the opening day of the season, and also in a 2–1 home win over Cheltenham Town in the following match. His last appearance of the campaign came in a 2–3 defeat at Bristol Rovers on 25 August 2001 and he didn't feature again in Luton's first-team for the rest of the season. He was released by Kinnear, having spent 3 seasons with the Hatters, scoring five goals in 62 appearances.

=== Non-League football ===
On leaving Luton, Locke joined fellow ex-Hatter Gavin McGowan at Isthmian League Division One North side Hornchurch.

A regular for Hornchurch, making 38 appearances and scoring twice, Locke left the club during a financial crisis and signed for Bromley in 2005, where he made 21 appearances. After this brief spell, he was on the move again, signing in August 2006 for Tooting & Mitcham United, but just three months and 12 appearances later, in November 2006, he signed for Isthmian League Division One South side Whyteleafe, where he made five appearances, scoring two goals, before deciding to retire.

== Honours ==
Southend United

- Football League Third Division runner-up: 1990–91

Colchester United

- Football League Trophy runner-up: 1996–97

Bristol City

- Football League Second Division runner-up: 1997–98
