= Chris Fry (footballer) =

Welsh footballer

Personal information
- Full name: Christopher David Fry
- Date of birth: 23 October 1969 (age 57)
- Place of birth: Cardiff, Wales
- Position: Winger

Senior career*
| Years | Team | Apps | (Gls) |
| 1988–1991 | Cardiff City | 55 | (1) |
| 1991–1993 | Hereford United | 90 | (10) |
| 1993–1997 | Colchester United | 137 | (15) |
| 1997–1999 | Exeter City | 60 | (3) |
| 1999–2000 | Barry Town | 34 | (9) |
| 2000–2001 | Haverfordwest County | 32 | (2) |
| 2001–2002 | Llanelli | 6 | (0) |
| Total | | 414 | (40) |
- * Club domestic league appearances and goals

Christopher David Fry (born 23 October 1969) is a Welsh former professional footballer.

== Career ==
Born in Cardiff, Fry began his career at his hometown club Cardiff City, making his debut at the end of the 1988–89 season. Over the next few years, despite playing over 50 times, he struggled to establish himself in the side and more than half of his appearances were as a substitute, with his only goal for the club scored during the 1989–90 season in a 2–2 draw with Brentford. In August 1991 he was allowed to leave the club to sign for Hereford United. He spent just over two seasons at the club, playing over 100 times. He was then signed by Colchester United where he went on to become an established regular in the side, including winning the club's player of the year award in the 1996–97 season.

Fry left Colchester in 1997 and spent two years at Exeter City before dropping out of league football with spells at Welsh sides Barry Town, Haverfordwest County and Llanelli.

== Honours ==
Colchester United

- Football League Trophy runner-up: 1996–97

Individual

- Colchester United Player of the Year: 1997
