= 1993–94 Colchester United F.C. season =

Colchester United
1993–94 season
- Chairman: Gordon Parker
- Manager: Roy McDonough
- Stadium: Layer Road
- Third Division: 17th
- FA Cup: 1st round (eliminated by Sutton United)
- League Cup: 1st round (eliminated by Fulham)
- Football League Trophy: Quarter-final (southern section) (eliminated by Wycombe Wanderers)
- Top goalscorer: League: Steve Brown (11); All: Steve Brown (13)
- Highest home attendance: 3,478 v Mansfield Town, 27 December 1993
- Lowest home attendance: 1,489 v Cambridge United, 19 October 1993
- Average home league attendance: 2,833
- Biggest win: 5–2 v Wycombe Wanderers, 18 September 1993; 4–1 v Bury, 25 September 1993
- Biggest defeat: 0–5 v Hereford United, 16 October 1993
Home colours

The 1993–94 season was Colchester United's 52nd season in their history and their second consecutive season in the fourth tier of English football, the Third Division. Alongside competing in the Third Division, the club also participated in the FA Cup, the League Cup and the Football League Trophy.

Following a 10th-placed finish the previous campaign, Colchester's defensive frailties were clear as they shipped 71 goals, the second-highest in the league and ended the season in 17th. They crashed out of the FA Cup to non-League opposition in Sutton United, while Fulham saw off the U's in the first round of the League Cup. In the Football League Trophy, Colchester progressed to the southern section quarter-final but were eliminated by old Conference rivals Wycombe Wanderers.

== Season overview ==
Following a campaign of goalkeeping uncertainty where the U's employed six different 'keepers over the course of the season, finding a regular starter between the sticks was key for manager Roy McDonough. With youth team product Nathan Munson on the books, McDonough brought in John Keeley from Oldham Athletic in the summer. However, his performances did not convince and he played his final game for the club in November 1993. This meant a string of mid-season transfers and loans of goalkeepers into the club, and the U's ended the season having once again used six different goalkeepers. McDonough even found himself in goal in October 1993 when facing Hereford United after Keeley and substitute Munson were both sent off for professional fouls. The U's went on to lose that game 5–0. Colchester were the first Football League club to have two goalkeepers sent off in the same fixture. Hereford striker Chris Pike scored a hat-trick in the game, with each of his goals coming against three different goalkeepers.

The fans frustration at the defensive performances came to a head in the FA Cup first round. The U's found themselves 2–0 down at home to non-League side Sutton United, before goals from Steve McGavin and Steve Brown levelled the score at 2–2 early in the second half. Sutton struck again in the 84th minute, before Tony English equalised two minutes later. Despite their best efforts, two-minutes from time, Ollie Morah scored the winner for Sutton to send them into the second round.

The financial situation was bleak. There were no funds to bring in a permanent goalkeeper, and striker Steve McGavin was sold to Birmingham City for £150,000 in January. Again, no funds were made available for a replacement. It took a consortium of local businessmen to raise £10,000 to buy Steve Whitton from Ipswich Town on deadline day to fill the gap. As such, the U's ended the season in a disappointing 17th-position in Division Three.

There was an early exit from the League Cup as Fulham beat Colchester over two legs in the first round, while in the Football League Trophy, the U's progressed from the first round group stage, then beat Wrexham in the second round, before falling to defeat in the southern section quarter-final at home to Wycombe Wanderers, who won 1–0.

Roy McDonough was handed a silver salver by chairman Gordon Parker on the last day of the season in recognition of McDonough's 500th career appearance. Three days later it was Parker, McDonough's father-in-law, that sacked him.

== Players ==
As of match played 7 May 1994.

| Name | Position | Nationality | Place of birth | Date of birth | Apps | Goals | Signed from | Date signed | Fee |
Goalkeepers
| John Cheesewright | GK | (England) | Romford | 12 January 1973 (aged 20) | 0 | 0 | (England) Braintree Town | 11 January 1994 (Note: Date of signing refers to the date of the player's first game for the club) | £10,000 |
| David Schultz | GK | | | | 0 | 0 | Apprentice | Summer 1993 | Free transfer |
Defenders
| Tim Allpress | DF | (England) | Hitchin | 27 January 1971 (aged 22) | 0 | 0 | (Germany) Bayer Uerdingen | 16 August 1993 | Undisclosed |
| Simon Betts | FB | (England) | Middlesbrough | 3 March 1973 (aged 20) | 25 | 0 | (England) Scarborough | 11 December 1992 | Free transfer |
| Peter Cawley | CB | (England) | Walton-on-Thames | 15 September 1965 (aged 27) | 27 | 3 | (England) Barnet | 30 October 1992 (Note: Date of signing refers to the date of the player's first game in his second spell for the club) | Free transfer |
| Tony English | DF/MF | (England) | Luton | 19 October 1966 (aged 26) | 399 | 50 | (England) Coventry City | 24 December 1984 | Free transfer |
| Andy Partner | CB | (England) | Colchester | 21 October 1974 (aged 18) | 4 | 0 | Apprentice | 16 December 1991 | Free transfer |
Midfielders
| Steve Ball | MF | (England) | Colchester | 2 September 1969 (aged 23) | 33 | 9 | (England) Cambridge United | 14 September 1992 | Free transfer |
| Tony Cook | MF | (England) | Hemel Hempstead | 17 September 1976 (aged 16) | 0 | 0 | (England) Queens Park Rangers | 11 January 1994 | Free transfer |
| Alan Dickens | MF | (England) | Plaistow | 3 September 1964 (aged 28) | 0 | 0 | (England) Brentford | September 1993 | Free transfer |
| Chris Fry | MF/WG | (Wales) | Cardiff | 23 October 1969 (aged 23) | 0 | 0 | (England) Hereford United | 24 October 1993 | Nominal |
| Mark Kinsella | MF | (Republic of Ireland) | Dublin | 12 August 1972 (aged 20) | 121 | 13 | (Republic of Ireland) Home Farm | 18 August 1989 | Free transfer |
Forwards
| Paul Abrahams | FW/WG | (England) | Colchester | 31 October 1973 (aged 19) | 32 | 6 | Apprentice | 26 August 1991 | Free transfer |
| Steve Brown | FW | (England) | Southend-on-Sea | 6 December 1973 (aged 19) | 0 | 0 | (England) Scunthorpe United | 28 August 1993 | Undisclosed |
| Sean Campbell | WG | (England) | Bristol | 31 December 1974 (aged 18) | 0 | 0 | Apprentice | Summer 1993 | Free transfer |
| Roy McDonough | FW | (England) | Solihull | 16 October 1958 (aged 34) | 222 | 73 | (England) Southend United | 13 October 1990 | Part exchange |
| Steve Whitton | FW | (England) | East Ham | 4 December 1960 (aged 32) | 0 | 0 | (England) Ipswich Town | 24 March 1994 | £10,000 |

== Transfers ==
=== In ===
| Date | Position | Nationality | Name | From | Fee | Ref. |
|---|---|---|---|---|---|---|
| Summer 1993 | WG | (England) | Sean Campbell | Apprentice | Free transfer | |
| Summer 1993 | GK | (England) | David Schultz | Apprentice | Free transfer | |
| July 1993 | GK | (England) | John Keeley | (England) Oldham Athletic | Free transfer | |
| August 1993 | FW | (Scotland) | Grant Morrow | (England) Doncaster Rovers | Undisclosed | |
| 16 August 1993 | DF | (England) | Tim Allpress | (Germany) Bayer Uerdingen | Undisclosed | |
| 28 August 1993 | FW | (England) | Steve Brown | (England) Scunthorpe United | Undisclosed | (Note: Date of signing refers to the date of the player's first game for the club) |
| September 1993 | MF | (England) | Alan Dickens | (England) Brentford | Free transfer | |
| September 1993 | FW | (England) | John Richardson | (England) Chesham United | Non-contract | |
| 24 October 1993 | MF/WG | (Wales) | Chris Fry | (England) Hereford United | Nominal | |
| 11 January 1994 | FW | (England) | Justin Booty | Apprentice | Free transfer | |
| 11 January 1994 | GK | (England) | John Cheesewright | (England) Braintree Town | £10,000 | |
| 11 January 1994 | MF | (England) | Tony Cook | (England) Queens Park Rangers | Free transfer | |
| February 1994 | FB | (England) | Christian Hyslop | (England) Southend United | Free transfer | |
| 24 March 1994 | GK | (United States) | Taylor Barada | (England) Notts County | Free transfer | |
| 24 March 1994 | FW | (England) | Steve Whitton | (England) Ipswich Town | £10,000 | |
| 30 April 1994 | FW | (England) | Justin Gentle | (England) Luton Town | Free transfer | |

- Total spending: ▼ ~ £20,000

=== Out ===
| Date | Position | Nationality | Name | To | Fee | Ref. |
|---|---|---|---|---|---|---|
| End of season | WG | (England) | Robert Hopkins | (England) Solihull Borough | Released | (Note: Joined as player-coach) |
| 14 August 1993 | MF | (England) | Jason Cook | (England) Dagenham & Redbridge | Released | (Note: Date of departure refers to the date of the player's final game for the club) |
| 28 August 1993 | FW | (Scotland) | Grant Morrow | (England) Boston United | Undisclosed | |
| 31 August 1993 | FW | (England) | Julian Hazel | (England) Chelmsford City | Released | |
| 11 September 1993 | WG | (England) | Gary Bennett | (England) Woking | Free transfer | |
| 21 October 1993 | FB | (England) | Martin Grainger | (England) Brentford | £60,000 | |
| 20 November 1993 | GK | (England) | John Keeley | (England) Chelmsford City | Released | |
| 11 December 1993 | GK | (England) | Nathan Munson | (England) Wivenhoe Town | Released | |
| 11 December 1993 | FW | (England) | John Richardson | (England) Chesham United | Released | |
| 3 January 1994 | DF | (England) | Paul Roberts | (England) Chesham United | Released | |
| 7 January 1994 | FW | (England) | Steve McGavin | (England) Birmingham City | £150,000 | |
| 15 January 1994 | FW | (England) | Justin Booty | (England) Braintree Town | Released | |
| 29 March 1994 | FB | (England) | Christian Hyslop | (England) Hendon | Released | |
| 30 April 1994 | GK | (United States) | Taylor Barada | (United States) Richmond Kickers | Undisclosed | |
| 7 May 1994 | FW | (England) | Justin Gentle | (England) Chesham United | Released | |
| 7 May 1994 | LM | (England) | Nicky Smith | (England) Wycombe Wanderers | Released | |

- Total incoming: ▲ ~ £0

=== Loans in ===
| Date | Position | Nationality | Name | From | End date | Ref. |
|---|---|---|---|---|---|---|
| 8 October 1993 | MF/FB | (England) | Adam Locke | (England) Southend United | 2 November 1993 | (Note: Loan end date refers to the date of the player's final game for the club) |
| 30 October 1993 | GK | (England) | Mike Desborough | (England) Chelmsford City | 30 October 1993 | (Note: Loan start and end dates refer to the date of the player's first and final games for the club) |
| 18 November 1993 | CB | (England) | Mike Basham | (England) West Ham United | 20 November 1993 | |
| 23 December 1993 | GK | (England) | Jon Sheffield | (England) Cambridge United | 27 January 1994 | |
| January 1994 | FW | (England) | Grant Watts | (England) Crystal Palace | 4 April 1994 | |
| 22 March 1994 | WG | (England) | Ian Brown | (England) Bristol City | 6 April 1994 | (Note: Second spell with the club) |

== Match details ==
=== Third Division ===
==== Results round by round ====
| Round | 1 | 2 | 3 | 4 | 5 | 6 | 7 | 8 | 9 | 10 | 11 | 12 | 13 | 14 | 15 | 16 | 17 | 18 | 19 | 20 | 21 | 22 | 23 | 24 | 25 | 26 | 27 | 28 | 29 | 30 | 31 | 32 | 33 | 34 | 35 | 36 | 37 | 38 | 39 | 40 | 41 | 42 |
|---|---|---|---|---|---|---|---|---|---|---|---|---|---|---|---|---|---|---|---|---|---|---|---|---|---|---|---|---|---|---|---|---|---|---|---|---|---|---|---|---|---|---|
| Ground | H | A | H | H | A | H | A | H | A | H | A | H | A | A | H | A | H | H | H | A | H | A | H | A | H | A | H | A | H | A | H | A | A | H | A | A | H | A | H | A | H | A |
| Result | W | L | W | D | D | L | W | W | L | W | L | W | L | L | L | L | W | L | D | W | D | L | W | D | L | W | L | D | L | D | L | L | W | D | D | D | L | L | L | W | W | L |
| Position | 5 | 11 | 8 | 9 | 8 | 12 | 8 | 5 | 6 | 6 | 8 | 5 | 9 | 11 | 14 | 15 | 13 | 15 | 17 | 13 | 12 | 14 | 11 | 11 | 15 | 13 | 14 | 15 | 15 | 18 | 18 | 18 | 15 | 17 | 15 | 16 | 18 | 18 | 18 | 18 | 16 | 17 |

Source: 11v11.com
A = Away; H = Home; W = Win; D = Draw; L = Loss

==== League table ====
| Pos | Team | Pld | W | D | L | GF | GA | GD | Pts |
|---|---|---|---|---|---|---|---|---|---|
| 15 | Doncaster Rovers | 42 | 14 | 10 | 18 | 44 | 57 | −13 | 52 |
| 16 | Gillingham | 42 | 12 | 15 | 15 | 44 | 51 | −7 | 51 |
| 17 | Colchester United | 42 | 13 | 10 | 19 | 56 | 71 | −15 | 49 |
| 18 | Lincoln City | 42 | 12 | 11 | 19 | 52 | 63 | −11 | 47 |
| 19 | Wigan Athletic | 42 | 11 | 12 | 19 | 51 | 70 | −19 | 45 |

==== Matches ====
| 14 August 1993 1 | Colchester United | 1–0 | Lincoln City | Colchester |
| | Kinsella 55' | Report | | Stadium: Layer Road; Attendance: 3,198; Referee: Mike Reid |

| 21 August 1993 2 | Crewe Alexandra | 2–1 | Colchester United | Crewe |
| | Ward 41', 59' | Report | Ball 68' | Stadium: Gresty Road; Attendance: 2,700; Referee: J Holbrook |

| 28 August 1993 3 | Colchester United | 3–2 | Northampton Town | Colchester |
| | Grainger 34' (pen.); English 41'; Mark Kinsella 71' | Report | Brown 5'; Gilzean 35' | Stadium: Layer Road; Attendance: 2,874; Referee: M Bailey |

| 31 August 1993 4 | Colchester United | 3–3 | Shrewsbury Town | Colchester |
| | McGavin 3', 23'; S. Brown 45' | Report | Lynch 1'; Summerfield 79'; Spink 88' | Stadium: Layer Road; Attendance: 2,723; Referee: Graham Poll |

| 4 September 1993 5 | Torquay United | 3–3 | Colchester United | Torquay |
| | Foster 58', 78', 82' | Report | S. Brown 35'; McGavin 36'; Curran 47' (o.g.) | Stadium: Plainmoor; Attendance: 2,989; Referee: Steve Dunn |

| 11 September 1993 6 | Colchester United | 2–5 | Rochdale | Colchester |
| | McDonough 8'; S. Brown 37' | Report | Lancaster 10', 74'; Butler 16'; Reeves 67'; Whitehall 78' | Stadium: Layer Road; Attendance: 2,776; Referee: G Pooley |

| 18 September 1993 7 | Wycombe Wanderers | 2–5 | Colchester United | High Wycombe |
| | Scott 19' (pen.); Langford 49'; Cousins (red card) 30' | Report | Kinsella 43'; McGavin 59'; McDonough 65'; Grainger 75'; S. Brown 89' | Stadium: Adams Park; Attendance: 8,025; Referee: Clive Wilkes |

| 25 September 1993 8 | Colchester United | 4–1 | Bury | Colchester |
| | S. Brown 8', 48', 53'; McGavin 38' | Report | Kearney 55' | Stadium: Layer Road; Attendance: 2,702; Referee: Paul Alcock |

| 2 October 1993 9 | Preston North End | 1–0 | Colchester United | Preston |
| | Ellis 73' | Report | | Stadium: Deepdale; Attendance: 6,412; Referee: J Watson |

| 9 October 1993 10 | Colchester United | 2–1 | Scunthorpe United | Colchester |
| | Kinsella 32'; S. Brown 78' | Report | Carmichael 5' | Stadium: Layer Road; Attendance: 3,405; Referee: Kelvin Morton |

| 16 October 1993 11 | Hereford United | 5–0 | Colchester United | Hereford |
| | Pike 28', 43' (pen.), 51'; Fry 65'; Hall 88' | Report | Keeley (red card) 43'; Munson (red card) 68' | Stadium: Edgar Street; Attendance: 1,848; Referee: R Groves |

| 23 October 1993 12 | Colchester United | 3–1 | Wigan Athletic | Colchester |
| | McDonough 4', 51'; Kinsella 65' | Report | Gillespie 27' | Stadium: Layer Road; Attendance: 2,814; Referee: I Hemley |

| 30 October 1993 13 | Gillingham | 3–0 | Colchester United | Gillingham |
| | Green 17'; Forster 40'; Reinelt 90' | Report | | Stadium: Priestfield Stadium; Attendance: 3,964; Referee: Gary Willard |

| 2 November 1993 14 | Darlington | 7–3 | Colchester United | Darlington |
| | Ellison 1', 80'; Painter 20', 58'; Chapman 33', 84'; Himsworth 71' | Report | Dickens 9'; McGavin 59'; Kinsella 75' | Stadium: Feethams; Attendance: 1,299; Referee: P Harrison |

| 6 November 1993 15 | Colchester United | 0–1 | Walsall | Colchester |
| | | Report | Peer 9' | Stadium: Layer Road; Attendance: 2,736; Referee: D Orr |

| 20 November 1993 16 | Doncaster Rovers | 2–1 | Colchester United | Doncaster |
| | Yates 54'; Page 67' | Report | McGavin 62' | Stadium: Belle Vue; Attendance: 2,034; Referee: Brian Hill |

| 27 November 1993 17 | Colchester United | 2–1 | Carlisle United | Colchester |
| | English 43', 88' | Report | Thomas 5' | Stadium: Layer Road; Attendance: 2,316; Referee: Paul Danson |

| 11 December 1993 18 | Colchester United | 2–4 | Crewe Alexandra | Colchester |
| | English 44'; S. Brown 64' | Report | Rowbotham 2', 17'; Gardiner 64'; Whalley 90' | Stadium: Layer Road; Attendance: 2,647; Referee: B Coddington |

| 27 December 1993 19 | Colchester United | 0–0 | Mansfield Town | Colchester |
| | | Report | | Stadium: Layer Road; Attendance: 3,478; Referee: M Bailey |

| 28 December 1993 20 | Scarborough | 0–2 | Colchester United | Scarborough |
| | | Report | McDonough 65'; McGavin 88' | Stadium: Athletic Ground; Attendance: 1,226; Referee: Neale Barry |

| 1 January 1994 21 | Colchester United | 0–0 | Chester City | Colchester |
| | | Report | | Stadium: Layer Road; Attendance: 3,170; Referee: Gary Willard |

| 3 January 1994 22 | Shrewsbury Town | 2–1 | Colchester United | Shrewsbury |
| | Walton 55'; Spink 80' | Report | Ball 40' | Stadium: Gay Meadow; Attendance: 4,245; Referee: Roger Milford |

| 15 January 1994 23 | Colchester United | 1–0 | Hereford United | Colchester |
| 15:00 GMT | Dickens 75' | Report | Davies (red card) 11' | Stadium: Layer Road; Attendance: 2,439; Referee: G Pooley |

| 22 January 1994 24 | Scunthorpe United | 1–1 | Colchester United | Scunthorpe |
| | Carmichael 54' | Report | Cawley 67' | Stadium: Glanford Park; Attendance: 2,854; Referee: I Cruickshanks |

| 29 January 1994 25 | Colchester United | 1–2 | Gillingham | Colchester |
| 15:00 GMT | Watts 67' | Report | Smith 51'; Forster 89' | Stadium: Layer Road; Attendance: 3,436; Referee: J Key |

| 5 February 1994 26 | Wigan Athletic | 0–1 | Colchester United | Wigan |
| | | Report | Dickens 80' | Stadium: Springfield Park; Attendance: 1,695; Referee: G Singh |

| 12 February 1994 27 | Colchester United | 0–2 | Chesterfield | Colchester |
| 15:00 GMT | | Report | Morris 6', 58' | Stadium: Layer Road; Attendance: 2,783; Referee: R Bigger |

| 19 February 1994 28 | Northampton Town | 1–1 | Colchester United | Northampton |
| | Wilkin 19' | Report | McDonough 24'; Hyslop (red card) 7' | Stadium: County Ground; Attendance: 3,185; Referee: T Lunt |

| 25 February 1994 29 | Colchester United | 1–2 | Torquay United | Colchester |
| 15:00 GMT | Betts 73' | Report | Hathaway 56'; Hodges 77' | Stadium: Layer Road; Attendance: 2,573; Referee: M Pierce |

| 5 March 1994 30 | Rochdale | 1–1 | Colchester United | Rochdale |
| | Stuart 73' | Report | Watts 6' | Stadium: Spotland Stadium; Attendance: 2,202; Referee: K Lupton |

| 12 March 1994 31 | Colchester United | 0–2 | Wycombe Wanderers | Colchetser |
| 15:00 GMT | | Report | Stapleton 58'; Titterton 89' | Stadium: Layer Road; Attendance: 3,932; Referee: Paul Alcock |

| 15 March 1994 32 | Lincoln City | 2–0 | Colchester United | Lincoln |
| | Mardenborough 75'; Matthews 84' | Report | | Stadium: Sincil Bank; Attendance: 1,631; Referee: R Poulain |

| 19 March 1994 33 | Bury | 0–1 | Colchester United | Bury |
| | | Report | McDonough 57' | Stadium: Gigg Lane; Attendance: 2,108; Referee: P Wright |

| 26 March 1994 34 | Colchester United | 1–1 | Preston North End | Colchester |
| 15:00 GMT | I. Brown 76' | Report | Norbury 16' | Stadium: Layer Road; Attendance: 2,950; Referee: Peter Jones |

| 29 March 1994 35 | Chesterfield | 0–0 | Colchester United | Chesterfield |
| | | Report | | Stadium: Saltergate; Attendance: 3,089; Referee: Joe Worrall |

| 2 April 1994 36 | Mansfield Town | 1–1 | Colchester United | Mansfield |
| | Holland 5' | Report | Gray 34' (o.g.) | Stadium: Field Mill; Attendance: 2,117; Referee: Steve Dunn |

| 4 April 1994 37 | Colchester United | 1–2 | Scarborough | Colchester |
| 15:00 BST | Meyer 72' (o.g.) | Report | Thompson 6'; Young 41' | Stadium: Layer Road; Attendance: 2,501; Referee: Gary Willard |

| 9 April 1994 38 | Chester City | 2–1 | Colchester United | Chester |
| | Lightfoot 30', 89' | Report | S. Brown 34' | Stadium: Deva Stadium; Attendance: 3,394; Referee: R Sheppard |

| 16 April 1994 39 | Colchester United | 1–2 | Darlington | Colchester |
| 15:00 BST | Kinsella 45' | Report | Shaw 8'; Chapman 78' | Stadium: Layer Road; Attendance: 2,337; Referee: K Leach |

| 23 April 1994 40 | Walsall | 1–2 | Colchester United | Walsall |
| | Watkiss 19' | Report | Watkiss 19' (o.g.); Kinsella 74' | Stadium: Bescot Stadium; Attendance: 2,980; Referee: J Key |

| 30 April 1994 41 | Colchester United | 3–1 | Doncaster Rovers | Colchester |
| | Whitton 79', 81'; S. Brown 83' | Report | Wilcox 43' | Stadium: Layer Road; Attendance: 2,378; Referee: Paul Alcock |

| 7 May 1994 42 | Carlisle United | 2–0 | Colchester United | Carlisle |
| | Kinsella 3' (o.g.); Conway 61' | Report | | Stadium: Brunton Park; Attendance: 9,305 |

=== League Cup ===
| 17 August 1993 1st round 1st leg | Fulham | 2–1 | Colchester United | Fulham |
| | Betts 59' (o.g.); Farrell | Report | Kinsella 35' | Stadium: Craven Cottage; Attendance: 2,820; Referee: A Smith |

| 24 August 1993 1st round 2nd leg | Colchester United | 1–2 | Fulham | Colchester |
| | McDonough 5' | Report | Brazil 55'; Farrell 63' | Stadium: Layer Road; Attendance: 3,360; Referee: R Bigger |
Note: Fulham won 4–2 on aggregate.

=== Football League Trophy ===
Group 6
| Team | Pld | W | D | L | GF | GA | GD | Pts | Qualification |
|---|---|---|---|---|---|---|---|---|---|
| Cambridge United | 2 | 1 | 1 | 0 | 4 | 2 | +2 | 4 | Qualified for next round |
| Colchester United | 2 | 0 | 2 | 0 | 2 | 2 | 0 | 2 | Qualified for next round |
| Gillingham | 2 | 0 | 1 | 1 | 0 | 2 | −2 | 1 | |

| 28 September 1993 1st round (southern section) | Gillingham | 0–0 | Colchester United | Gillingham |
| | | Report | | Stadium: Priestfield Stadium; Attendance: 1,091; Referee: Alan Gunn |

| 19 October 1993 1st round (southern section) | Colchester United | 2–2 | Cambridge United | Colchester |
| | Kinsella 12'; S. Brown 56' | Report | Clayton 47'; Heathcote 90' | Stadium: Layer Road; Attendance: 1,489; Referee: R Bigger |

| 4 December 1993 2nd round (southern section) | Wrexham | 0–1 | Colchester United | Wrexham |
| | | Report | McDonough 87' | Stadium: Racecourse Ground; Attendance: 1,860; Referee: J Brandwood |

| 11 January 1994 Quarter-final (southern section) | Colchester United | 0–1 | Wycombe Wanderers | Colchester |
| 19:45 GMT | | Report | Guppy 86' | Stadium: Layer Road; Attendance: 2,751; Referee: Peter Jones |

=== FA Cup ===
| 13 November 1993 1st round | Colchester United | 3–4 | Sutton United | Colchester |
| | McGavin 40'; S. Brown 52'; English 86' | Report | Quail 18'; Smart 30'; Newman 84'; Morah 88' | Stadium: Layer Road; Attendance: 3,051; Referee: Neale Barry |

== Squad statistics ==
=== Appearances and goals ===
| No. | Pos | Nat | Player | Total | | Third Division | | FA Cup | | League Cup | | Football League Trophy | |
| No. | Pos | Nat | Player | Apps | Goals | Apps | Goals | Apps | Goals | Apps | Goals | Apps | Goals |
|---|---|---|---|---|---|---|---|---|---|---|---|---|---|
| | GK | (England) ENG | John Cheesewright | 18 | 0 | 17 | 0 | 0 | 0 | 0 | 0 | 1 | 0 |
| | DF | (England) ENG | Tim Allpress | 27 | 0 | 21+2 | 0 | 0 | 0 | 1+1 | 0 | 2 | 0 |
| | DF | (England) ENG | Simon Betts | 38 | 1 | 31+2 | 1 | 1 | 0 | 1 | 0 | 3 | 0 |
| | DF | (England) ENG | Peter Cawley | 41 | 1 | 36 | 1 | 1 | 0 | 0 | 0 | 4 | 0 |
| | DF | (England) ENG | Tony English | 49 | 5 | 42 | 4 | 1 | 1 | 2 | 0 | 4 | 0 |
| | MF | (England) ENG | Steve Ball | 38 | 2 | 27+5 | 2 | 0 | 0 | 2 | 0 | 3+1 | 0 |
| | MF | (England) ENG | Alan Dickens | 36 | 3 | 28+4 | 3 | 1 | 0 | 0 | 0 | 3 | 0 |
| | MF | (Wales) WAL | Chris Fry | 17 | 0 | 12+5 | 0 | 0 | 0 | 0 | 0 | 0 | 0 |
| | MF | (Republic of Ireland) IRL | Mark Kinsella | 48 | 10 | 42 | 8 | 1 | 0 | 2 | 1 | 3 | 1 |
| | FW | (England) ENG | Paul Abrahams | 6 | 0 | 1+3 | 0 | 0 | 0 | 0+2 | 0 | 0 | 0 |
| | FW | (England) ENG | Steve Brown | 38 | 13 | 30+4 | 11 | 1 | 1 | 0 | 0 | 3 | 1 |
| | FW | (England) ENG | Sean Campbell | 5 | 0 | 1+3 | 0 | 0 | 0 | 0 | 0 | 1 | 0 |
| | FW | (England) ENG | Tony Cook | 3 | 0 | 1+1 | 0 | 0 | 0 | 0 | 0 | 0+1 | 0 |
| | FW | (England) ENG | Roy McDonough | 45 | 9 | 36+2 | 7 | 1 | 0 | 2 | 1 | 3+1 | 1 |
| | FW | (England) ENG | Steve Whitton | 8 | 2 | 8 | 2 | 0 | 0 | 0 | 0 | 0 | 0 |
Players who appeared for Colchester who left during the season
| | GK | (United States) USA | Taylor Barada | 1 | 0 | 1 | 0 | 0 | 0 | 0 | 0 | 0 | 0 |
| | GK | (England) ENG | Mike Desborough | 1 | 0 | 1 | 0 | 0 | 0 | 0 | 0 | 0 | 0 |
| | GK | (England) ENG | John Keeley | 20 | 0 | 15 | 0 | 1 | 0 | 2 | 0 | 2 | 0 |
| | GK | (England) ENG | Nathan Munson | 4 | 0 | 2+1 | 0 | 0 | 0 | 0 | 0 | 1 | 0 |
| | GK | (England) ENG | Jon Sheffield | 6 | 0 | 6 | 0 | 0 | 0 | 0 | 0 | 0 | 0 |
| | DF | (England) ENG | Mike Basham | 1 | 0 | 1 | 0 | 0 | 0 | 0 | 0 | 0 | 0 |
| | DF | (England) ENG | Martin Grainger | 11 | 2 | 5+3 | 2 | 0 | 0 | 2 | 0 | 1 | 0 |
| | DF | (England) ENG | Christian Hyslop | 8 | 0 | 8 | 0 | 0 | 0 | 0 | 0 | 0 | 0 |
| | DF | (England) ENG | Paul Roberts | 26 | 0 | 21 | 0 | 1 | 0 | 2 | 0 | 2 | 0 |
| | MF | (England) ENG | Jason Cook | 1 | 0 | 0+1 | 0 | 0 | 0 | 0 | 0 | 0 | 0 |
| | MF | (England) ENG | Adam Locke | 5 | 0 | 4 | 0 | 0 | 0 | 0 | 0 | 1 | 0 |
| | MF | (England) ENG | Nicky Smith | 44 | 0 | 29+10 | 0 | 1 | 0 | 2 | 0 | 2 | 0 |
| | FW | (England) ENG | Gary Bennett | 6 | 0 | 3+1 | 0 | 0 | 0 | 2 | 0 | 0 | 0 |
| | FW | (England) ENG | Justin Booty | 2 | 0 | 0+1 | 0 | 0 | 0 | 0 | 0 | 1 | 0 |
| | FW | (England) ENG | Ian Brown | 4 | 1 | 4 | 1 | 0 | 0 | 0 | 0 | 0 | 0 |
| | FW | (England) ENG | Justin Gentle | 2 | 0 | 0+2 | 0 | 0 | 0 | 0 | 0 | 0 | 0 |
| | FW | (England) ENG | Steve McGavin | 27 | 9 | 20+1 | 8 | 1 | 1 | 2 | 0 | 3 | 0 |
| | FW | (Scotland) SCO | Grant Morrow | 1 | 0 | 0+1 | 0 | 0 | 0 | 0 | 0 | 0 | 0 |
| | FW | (England) ENG | John Richardson | 10 | 0 | 1+7 | 0 | 0 | 0 | 0 | 0 | 1+1 | 0 |
| | FW | (England) ENG | Grant Watts | 13 | 2 | 8+4 | 2 | 0 | 0 | 0 | 0 | 0+1 | 0 |

=== Goalscorers ===
| Place | Nationality | Position | Name | Third Division | FA Cup | League Cup | Football League Trophy | Total |
|---|---|---|---|---|---|---|---|---|
| 1 | (England) | FW | Steve Brown | 11 | 1 | 0 | 1 | 13 |
| 2 | (Republic of Ireland) | MF | Mark Kinsella | 8 | 0 | 1 | 1 | 10 |
| 3 | (England) | FW | Roy McDonough | 7 | 0 | 1 | 1 | 9 |
| 3 | (England) | FW | Steve McGavin | 8 | 1 | 0 | 0 | 9 |
| 5 | (England) | DF/MF | Tony English | 4 | 1 | 0 | 0 | 5 |
| 6 | (England) | MF | Alan Dickens | 3 | 0 | 0 | 0 | 3 |
| 7 | (England) | MF | Steve Ball | 2 | 0 | 0 | 0 | 2 |
| 7 | (England) | FB | Martin Grainger | 2 | 0 | 0 | 0 | 2 |
| 7 | (England) | FW | Grant Watts | 2 | 0 | 0 | 0 | 2 |
| 7 | (England) | FW | Steve Whitton | 2 | 0 | 0 | 0 | 2 |
| 11 | (England) | FB | Simon Betts | 1 | 0 | 0 | 0 | 1 |
| 11 | (England) | WG | Ian Brown | 1 | 0 | 0 | 0 | 1 |
| 11 | (England) | CB | Peter Cawley | 1 | 0 | 0 | 0 | 1 |
| | | | Own goals | 4 | 0 | 0 | 0 | 4 |
| | | | TOTALS | 56 | 3 | 2 | 3 | 64 |

=== Disciplinary record ===
| Nationality | Position | Name | Third Division | | FA Cup | | League Cup | | Football League Trophy | | Total | |
| Nationality | Position | Name | Booked | Sent off (straight red) | Booked | Sent off (straight red) | Booked | Sent off (straight red) | Booked | Sent off (straight red) | Booked | Sent off (straight red) |
|---|---|---|---|---|---|---|---|---|---|---|---|---|
| (England) | FB | Christian Hyslop | 0 | 1 | 0 | 0 | 0 | 0 | 0 | 0 | 0 | 1 |
| (England) | GK | John Keeley | 0 | 1 | 0 | 0 | 0 | 0 | 0 | 0 | 0 | 1 |
| (England) | GK | Nathan Munson | 0 | 1 | 0 | 0 | 0 | 0 | 0 | 0 | 0 | 1 |
| | | TOTALS | 0 | 3 | 0 | 0 | 0 | 0 | 0 | 0 | 0 | 3 |

=== Clean sheets ===
Number of games goalkeepers kept a clean sheet.

| Place | Nationality | Player | Third Division | FA Cup | League Cup | Football League Trophy | Total |
|---|---|---|---|---|---|---|---|
| 1 | (England) | Jon Sheffield | 4 | 0 | 0 | 0 | 4 |
| 2 | (England) | John Cheesewright | 3 | 0 | 0 | 0 | 3 |
| 3 | (England) | John Keeley | 1 | 0 | 0 | 1 | 2 |
| 4 | (England) | Nathan Munson | 0 | 0 | 0 | 1 | 1 |
| | | TOTALS | 8 | 0 | 0 | 2 | 10 |

=== Player debuts ===
Players making their first-team Colchester United debut in a fully competitive match.

| Position | Nationality | Player | Date | Opponent | Ground | Notes |
|---|---|---|---|---|---|---|
| GK | (England) | John Keeley | 14 August 1993 | Lincoln City | Layer Road | |
| DF | (England) | Tim Allpress | 17 August 1993 | Fulham | Craven Cottage | |
| WG | (England) | Sean Campbell | 21 August 1993 | Crewe Alexandra | Gresty Road | |
| FW | (England) | Steve Brown | 28 August 1993 | Northampton Town | Layer Road | |
| FW | (Scotland) | Grant Morrow | 28 August 1993 | Northampton Town | Layer Road | |
| MF | (England) | Alan Dickens | 4 September 1993 | Torquay United | Plainmoor | |
| FW | (England) | John Richardson | 25 September 1993 | Bury | Layer Road | |
| MF/FB | (England) | Adam Locke | 9 October 1993 | Scunthorpe United | Layer Road | |
| GK | (England) | Mike Desborough | 30 October 1993 | Gillingham | Priestfield Stadium | |
| CB | (England) | Mike Basham | 20 November 1993 | Doncaster Rovers | Belle Vue | |
| MF/WG | (Wales) | Chris Fry | 27 December 1993 | Mansfield Town | Layer Road | |
| GK | (England) | Jon Sheffield | 27 December 1993 | Mansfield Town | Layer Road | |
| FW | (England) | Justin Booty | 11 January 1994 | Wycombe Wanderers | Layer Road | |
| GK | (England) | John Cheesewright | 11 January 1994 | Wycombe Wanderers | Layer Road | |
| MF | (England) | Tony Cook | 11 January 1994 | Wycombe Wanderers | Layer Road | |
| FW | (England) | Grant Watts | 11 January 1994 | Wycombe Wanderers | Layer Road | |
| FB | (England) | Christian Hyslop | 19 February 1994 | Northampton Town | County Ground | |
| WG | (England) | Ian Brown | 26 March 1994 | Preston North End | Layer Road | |
| FW | (England) | Steve Whitton | 29 March 1994 | Chesterfield | Saltergate | |
| GK | (United States) | Taylor Barada | 30 April 1994 | Doncaster Rovers | Layer Road | |
| FW | (United States) | Justin Gentle | 30 April 1994 | Doncaster Rovers | Layer Road | |

== See also ==
- List of Colchester United F.C. seasons
