= 1992–93 Colchester United F.C. season =

Colchester United
1992–93 season
- Chairman: Gordon Parker
- Manager: Roy McDonough
- Stadium: Layer Road
- Third Division: 10th
- FA Cup: 2nd round (eliminated by Gillingham)
- League Cup: 1st round (eliminated by Brighton & Hove Albion)
- Football League Trophy: 1st round (southern section)
- Conference Shield: Runners-up
- Top goalscorer: League: Roy McDonough; Steve McGavin (9); All: Gary Bennett; Steve McGavin (10)
- Highest home attendance: 5,695 v Gillingham, 16 April 1993
- Lowest home attendance: 1,454 v Northampton Town, 1 December 1992
- Average home league attendance: 3,768
- Biggest win: 4–0 v Slough Town, 14 November 1992
- Biggest defeat: 1–7 v Crewe Alexandra, 24 April 1993
Home colours

The 1992–93 season was Colchester United's 51st season in their history and their first season back in the Football League. Colchester competed in the Third Division, the fourth tier of English football, after achieving promotion from the Conference the season prior. Alongside competing in the Third Division, the club also participated in the FA Cup, the League Cup, the Football League Trophy, and the Conference Shield.

Roy McDonough led his newly promoted side to a tenth-placed finish in Division Three, finishing just four points off the play-off places. The club performed poorly in the cup competitions, instead focusing on league form. They exited the League Cup and Football League Trophy at the first round stages, and the FA Cup in the second round. They also faced Wycombe Wanderers in the Conference Shield, an annual tie between the Conference winners and the FA Trophy winners. As Colchester had achieved a non-League double, winning both trophies, they faced the second placed side from the previous campaign, Wycombe. McDonough sent a weakened side out for the match, again in favour of league football, as the U's lost 3–0 to their previous bitter rivals.

== Season overview ==
In the first season since the advent of the Premier League, Colchester's promotion back to the Football League meant that instead of joining the Fourth Division, they instead joined Division Three, the fourth tier of English football but no longer in name.

Chairman James Bowdidge stepped down from his role due to business commitments, and former reserve team player Gordon Parker took over.

Two major player departures occurred across the summer period, with ever-present goalkeeper Scott Barrett opting to join Gillingham on a free transfer, and Forward Mike Masters, who was unable to obtain a work permit.

Colchester lost four of their first five games and found themselves at the bottom of the league table. They also received a heavy fine from The Football Association for indiscipline, with manager Roy McDonough one of the main culprits. The U's attacking nature was not as effected against Football League opposition as it was against their Conference counterparts the previous season. They conceded seven goals and five goals on one occasion each, and also conceded four goals on six separate occasions. Despite this, they rallied late in the season to finish tenth in Division Three, just four points off the play-off positions.

In the FA Cup, Colchester defeated Slough Town by scoring four goals for the third consecutive meeting between the sides. They faced Gillingham at Priestfield Stadium in the second round, but were defeated in the Layer Road replay after a 1–1 draw.

Colchester were narrowly defeated in the first round of the League Cup, with Brighton & Hove Albion coming out on top 2–1 over two legs.

In the first round group stage of the Football League Trophy, the U's were beaten in both of their matches against Northampton Town and Barnet.

The club were also required to play in the Conference Shield, an annual match played between the victors of the FA Trophy and the Conference champions. As Colchester had sealed a non-League double in 1991–92, they faced Wycombe Wanderers who had finished as runners-up to the U's in the league. McDonough sent out a scratch side for the game and Wycombe duly won 3–0.

== Players ==
As of match played 8 May 1993.

Name	Position	Nationality	Place of birth	Date of birth	Apps	Goals	Signed from	Date signed	Fee
Goalkeepers
Nathan Munson	GK	(England)	Colchester	10 November 1974 (aged 17)	0	0	Apprentice	8 May 1993 (Note: Date of signing refers to the date of the player's first game for the club)	Free transfer
Defenders
Simon Betts	FB	(England)	Middlesbrough	3 March 1973 (aged 19)	0	0	(England) Scarborough	11 December 1992	Free transfer
Peter Cawley	CB	(England)	Walton-on-Thames	15 September 1965 (aged 26)	4	0	(England) Barnet	30 October 1992 (Note: Date of signing refers to the date of the player's first game in his second spell for the club)	Free transfer
Tony English	DF/MF	(England)	Luton	19 October 1966 (aged 25)	360	48	(England) Coventry City	24 December 1984	Free transfer
Martin Grainger	FB	(England)	Enfield Town	23 August 1972 (aged 19)	33	2	Apprentice	16 December 1989	Free transfer
Andy Partner	CB	(England)	Colchester	21 October 1974 (aged 17)	1	0	Apprentice	16 December 1991	Free transfer
Paul Roberts	DF	(England)	West Ham	27 April 1962 (aged 30)	45	1	(England) Fisher Athletic	28 September 1991	£750
Midfielders
Steve Ball	MF	(England)	Colchester	2 September 1969 (aged 22)	5	1	(England) Cambridge United	14 September 1992	Free transfer
Jason Cook	MF	(England)	Edmonton	29 December 1969 (aged 22)	44	3	(England) Southend United	28 September 1991	Free transfer
Mark Kinsella	MF	(Republic of Ireland)	Dublin	12 August 1972 (aged 19)	76	7	(Republic of Ireland) Home Farm	18 August 1989	Free transfer
Nicky Smith	LM	(England)	Berkeley	28 January 1969 (aged 23)	96	11	(England) Southend United	18 August 1990	Free transfer
Forwards
Paul Abrahams	FW/WG	(England)	Colchester	31 October 1973 (aged 18)	6	0	Apprentice	26 August 1991	Free transfer
Gary Bennett	WG	(England)	Enfield Town	13 November 1970 (aged 21)	145	37	(England) Tottenham Hotpsur	21 October 1988	Free transfer
Julian Hazel	FW	(England)	Luton	25 September 1973 (aged 18)	2	0	Apprentice	14 January 1992	Free transfer
Robert Hopkins	WG	(England)	Hall Green	25 October 1961 (aged 30)	0	0	(Hong Kong) Instant-Dict	February 1993	Non-contract
Roy McDonough	FW	(England)	Solihull	16 October 1958 (aged 33)	191	64	(England) Southend United	13 October 1990	Part exchange
Steve McGavin	FW	(England)	North Walsham	24 January 1969 (aged 23)	61	28	(England) Sudbury Town	1 April 1991	£10,000

== Transfers ==
=== In ===
Date	Position	Nationality	Name	From	Fee	Ref.
15 August 1992	CB	(England)	Darren Oxbrow	(England) Maidstone United	Free transfer	(Note: Date of signing refers to the date of the player's first game for the club)
14 September 1992	MF	(England)	Steve Ball	(England) Cambridge United	Free transfer	
6 October 1992	GK	(England)	Alasdair Monk	(England) Norwich City	Free transfer	
30 October 1992	CB	(England)	Peter Cawley	(England) Barnet	Free transfer	(Note: Date of signing refers to the date of the player's first game in his second spell for the club)
November 1992	MF	(England)	Tony Sorrell	(England) Peterborough United	Free transfer	
11 December 1992	FB	(England)	Simon Betts	(England) Scarborough	Free transfer	
February 1993	WG	(England)	Robert Hopkins	(Hong Kong) Instant-Dict	Non-contract	
12 March 1993	CB	(England)	Paul Flowers	(England) Watford	Free transfer	
8 May 1993	GK	(England)	Nathan Munson	Apprentice	Free transfer	

- Total spending: ▼ ~ £0

=== Out ===
Date	Position	Nationality	Name	To	Fee	Ref.
End of season	GK	(England)	Scott Barrett	(England) Gillingham	Free transfer	
End of season	MF	(Republic of Ireland)	Wayne Hannigan	(England) Chelmsford City	Released	
End of season	FW	(England)	Steve Restarick	(England) Chelmsford City	Released	
Summer 1992	MF	(Republic of Ireland)	Eamonn Collins	(England) Exeter City	Free transfer	
October 1992	DF	(England)	James Goodwin	(England) Earls Colne	Released	
24 October 1992	MF	(England)	Robbie Devereux	(Republic of Ireland) Shelbourne	Free transfer	(Note: Date of departure refers to the date of the player's final game for the club)
28 November 1992	MF/FB	(England)	Warren Donald	(England) Kettering Town	Released	
18 December 1992	MF	(England)	Tony Sorrell	(England) Barnet	Contract terminated (Note: Player sacked by the club following a training ground incident)	
21 December 1992	GK	(England)	Alasdair Monk	(England) Brantham Athletic	Released	
21 December 1992	FB	(Scotland)	Ian Phillips	(England) Halstead Town	Undisclosed	(Note: Joined as player-manager)
8 May 1993	CB	(England)	Paul Flowers	(England) Grays Athletic	Released	

- Total incoming: ▲ ~ £0

=== Loans in ===
Date	Position	Nationality	Name	From	End date	Ref.
12 August 1992	GK	(England)	Paul Newell	(England) Leyton Orient	3 November 1992	(Note: Loan end date refers to the date of the player's final game for the club)
October 1992	CB	(England)	Peter Cawley	(England) Barnet	24 October 1992	(Note: Loan end date refers to the date of the player's final game in his first spell for the club)
7 November 1992	GK	(England)	Ron Green	(England) Kidderminster Harriers	16 December 1992	(Note: Loan start and end dates refer to the date of the player's first and final games for the club)
17 December 1992	GK	(England)	Carl Emberson	(England) Millwall	12 March 1993	
31 December 1992	FW	(England)	Dean Martin	(England) West Ham United	28 February 1993	
19 March 1993	GK	(England)	Fred Barber	(England) Peterborough United	31 May 1993	

== Match details ==
=== Third Division ===
==== Results round by round ====
Round	1	2	3	4	5	6	7	8	9	10	11	12	13	14	15	16	17	18	19	20	21	22	23	24	25	26	27	28	29	30	31	32	33	34	35	36	37	38	39	40	41	42
Ground	H	A	H	H	A	H	A	A	H	A	H	A	H	H	A	H	A	H	A	A	H	A	H	A	H	H	A	H	A	H	H	A	H	A	A	A	H	H	A	H	A	A
Result	W	L	L	L	L	W	L	L	W	W	W	L	L	W	L	D	L	W	W	L	W	W	W	L	D	L	D	D	L	W	L	W	W	L	D	W	W	W	L	W	L	L
Position	8	9	18	22	22	18	21	22	15	16	9	15	15	14	14	15	17	13	11	15	11	10	6	7	7	9	11	12	12	12	13	13	13	13	14	13	11	10	11	10	10	10

Source: 11v11.com
A = Away; H = Home; W = Win; D = Draw; L = Loss

==== League table ====
Pos	Team	Pld	W	D	L	GF	GA	GD	Pts
8	Lincoln City	42	18	9	15	57	53	+4	63
9	Shrewsbury Town	42	17	11	14	57	52	+5	62
10	Colchester United	42	18	5	19	67	76	−9	59
11	Rochdale	42	16	10	16	70	70	0	58
12	Chesterfield	42	15	11	16	59	63	−4	56

==== Matches ====
15 August 1992 1	Colchester United	2–1	Lincoln City	Colchester
15:00 BST	McDonough 3'; Oxbrow 7'	Report	West 1'	Stadium: Layer Road; Attendance: 4,131; Referee: Graham Poll

21 August 1992 2	Barnet	3–1	Colchester United	Chipping Barnet
19:45 BST	Willis 72'; Bull 73'; Hoddle 81'	Report	Kinsella 16'	Stadium: Underhill Stadium; Attendance: 3,600; Referee: A Smith

29 August 1992 3	Colchester United	0–3	Darlington	Colchester
15:00 BST		Report	Shaw 10'; Juryeff 75'; Dobson 90'	Stadium: Layer Road; Attendance: 3,524; Referee: Gary Willard

1 September 1992 4	Colchester United	0–2	Shrewsbury Town	Colchester
19:30 BST	McDonough (red card) 15'	Report	Griffiths 44'; Brough 76'	Stadium: Layer Road; Attendance: 3,530; Referee: Paul Taylor

5 September 1992 5	Bury	3–2	Colchester United	Bury
	Lyons 44'; Robinson 79'; Scott 87'	Report	Bennett 85'; McDonough 90' (pen.)	Stadium: Gigg Lane; Attendance: 2,072; Referee: K Leach

12 September 1992 6	Colchester United	3–1	Walsall	Colchester
15:00 BST	Bennett 15'; Smith 35'; McDonough 84' (pen.)	Report	Ntamark 64'	Stadium: Layer Road; Attendance: 3,218; Referee: Paul Alcock

15 September 1992 7	Doncaster Rovers	1–0	Colchester United	Doncaster
	Jeffrey 24'	Report		Stadium: Belle Vue; Attendance: 1,719; Referee: Roger Dilkes

19 September 1992 8	York City	2–0	Colchester United	York
	Blackstone 14', 46'	Report		Stadium: Bootham Crescent; Attendance: 3,820; Referee: Jeff Winter

26 September 1992 9	Colchester United	3–0	Chesterfield	Colchester
15:00 BST	Bennett 45', 56'; Kinsella 90'	Report		Stadium: Layer Road; Attendance: 3,436; Referee: M Bailey

10 October 1992 10	Halifax Town	2–4	Colchester United	Halifax
	Matthews 74'; German 85'	Report	Kinsella 13'; Oxbrow 35'; McDonough 46'; Bennett 82'	Stadium: The Shay; Attendance: 2,445; Referee: Alan Wilkie

16 October 1992 11	Colchester United	3–2	Crewe Alexandra	Colchester
19:45 BST	Bennett 4'; McDonough 40'; Oxbrow 75'	Report	McCauley 7'; Naylor 77'	Stadium: Layer Road; Attendance: 4,524; Referee: David Elleray

24 October 1992 12	Scunthorpe United	3–1	Colchester United	Scunthorpe
	Daws 34'; Martin 36'; Helliwell 61'	Report	McGavin 38'	Stadium: Glanford Park; Attendance: 2,473; Referee: Peter Jones

30 October 1992 13	Colchester United	2–4	Wrexham	Colchester
19:45 GMT	Ball 40'; Kinsella 58'	Report	Bennett 23', 67'; B Jones 45'; Connolly 77'	Stadium: Layer Road; Attendance: 4,423; Referee: R Bigger

3 November 1992 14	Colchester United	2–1	Carlisle United	Colchester
19:45 GMT	Roberts 20'; Cawley 90'	Report	Barnsley 49'	Stadium: Layer Road; Attendance: 3,263; Referee: Ian Borrett

7 November 1992 15	Cardiff City	3–1	Colchester United	Cardiff
	Dale 46'; Blake 77'; English 78' (o.g.)	Report	Kinsella 90'	Stadium: Ninian Park; Attendance: 5,505; Referee: K Leach

21 November 1992 16	Colchester United	4–4	Rochdale	Colchester
15:00 GMT	Cawley 24'; Ball 27'; Sorrell 71'; McDonough 79'	Report	Payne 15' (pen.); Milner 36'; Flounders 76' (pen.), 87'	Stadium: Layer Road; Attendance: 3,172; Referee: P Scobie

28 November 1992 17	Hereford United	3–1	Colchester United	Hereford
	Pickard 9'; Donald 16' (o.g.); Jones 45'	Report	Oxbrow 58'	Stadium: Edgar Street; Attendance: 1,671; Referee: R Groves

11 December 1992 18	Colchester United	2–0	Torquay United	Colchester
19:45 GMT	McDonough 6'; Smith 33'	Report		Stadium: Layer Road; Attendance: 2,774; Referee: Gary Willard

18 December 1992 19	Gillingham	0–1	Colchester United	Gillingham
		Report	McGavin 86'	Stadium: Priestfield Stadium; Attendance: 2,331; Referee: R Pawley

26 December 1992 20	Northampton Town	1–0	Colchester United	Northampton
	McParland 23'	Report		Stadium: County Ground; Attendance: 4,861; Referee: Kelvin Morton

29 December 1992 21	Colchester United	1–0	Scarborough	Colchester
19:45 GMT	McGavin 14'	Report		Stadium: Layer Road; Attendance: 3,640; Referee: G Pooley

2 January 1993 22	Walsall	1–3	Colchester United	Walsall
	Clarke 81'	Report	Martin 17'; McGavin 44'; Cawley 62'	Stadium: Bescot Stadium; Attendance: 3,669; Referee: J Kirkby

8 January 1993 23	Colchester United	2–0	Doncaster Rovers	Colchester
19:45 GMT	Grainger 81'; McGavin 88'	Report		Stadium: Layer Road; Attendance: 4,402; Referee: Paul Taylor

16 January 1993 24	Chesterfield	4–0	Colchester United	Chesterfield
	Williams 66', 76'; Lemon 75'; Lancaster 88'	Report		Stadium: Saltergate; Attendance: 3,016; Referee: T Fitzharris

22 January 1993 25	Colchester United	0–0	York City	Colchester
19:45 GMT		Report		Stadium: Layer Road; Attendance: 4,528; Referee: M James

29 January 1993 26	Colchester United	1–2	Barnet	Colchester
19:45 GMT	Bennett 53'	Report	Bull 63'; Payne 69'	Stadium: Layer Road; Attendance: 5,609; Referee: D Shadwell

6 February 1993 27	Lincoln City	1–1	Colchester United	Lincoln
	Bressington 81'	Report	Martin 75'	Stadium: Sincil Bank; Attendance: 3,380; Referee: J Rushton

13 February 1993 28	Colchester United	0–0	Bury	Colchester
15:00 GMT		Report		Stadium: Layer Road; Attendance: 3,264; Referee: D Axcell

20 February 1993 29	Shrewsbury Town	4–3	Colchester United	Shrewsbury
	Griffiths 8', 88'; Smith 60'; English 66' (o.g.); Worsley (red card) 84'	Report	Hopkins 52'; Grainger 74' (pen.); McGavin 82'	Stadium: Gay Meadow; Attendance: 2,653; Referee: R Hamer

26 February 1993 30	Colchester United	2–1	Halifax Town	Colchester
19:45 GMT	McGavin 31'; Grainger 57'	Report	Thompstone 10'; Bracey (red card) 54'	Stadium: Layer Road; Attendance: 3,007; Referee: Paul Alcock

12 March 1993 31	Colchester United	2–4	Cardiff City	Colchester
19:45 GMT	McDonough 17' (pen.); McGavin 57'	Report	Pike 21', 33'; Richardson 23'; Matthews 63'	Stadium: Layer Road; Attendance: 4,538; Referee: G Pooley

20 March 1993 32	Carlisle United	0–2	Colchester United	Carlisle
		Report	Cook 23'; Edmondson 38' (o.g.)	Stadium: Brunton Park; Attendance: 3,003; Referee: K Redfearn

23 March 1993 33	Colchester United	3–1	Hereford United	Colchester
19:45 GMT	Titterton 7' (o.g.); McDonough 78'; Abrahams 88'	Report	Unknown goalscorer	Stadium: Layer Road; Attendance: 3,024; Referee: M Bailey

27 March 1993 34	Rochdale	5–2	Colchester United	Rochdale
	Jones 36'; Howard 39'; Whitehall 46'; Thackeray 50'; Bowden 73'	Report	Smith 28'; Abrahams 41'; McDonough (yellow card) 65' (red card) 66'	Stadium: Spotland Stadium; Attendance: 1,783; Referee: M Peck

6 April 1993 35	Torquay United	2–2	Colchester United	Torquay
	Barrow 54'; Hodges 60'	Report	McGavin 41'; Ball 66'	Stadium: Plainmoor; Attendance: 2,915; Referee: Gerald Ashby

13 April 1993 36	Scarborough	0–1	Colchester United	Scarborough
		Report	Abrahams 33'	Stadium: Athletic Ground; Attendance: 1,803; Referee: J Kirkby

16 April 1993 37	Colchester United	3–0	Gillingham	Colchester
19:45 BST	Clark 19' (o.g.); Smith 26'; Abrahams 56'	Report		Stadium: Layer Road; Attendance: 5,695; Referee: J Martin

20 April 1993 38	Colchester United	2–0	Northampton Town	Colchester
19:45 BST	Ball 62' (pen.); Abrahams 90'	Report	Brown (red card) 83'	Stadium: Layer Road; Attendance: 3,519; Referee: R Wiseman

24 April 1993 39	Crewe Alexandra	7–1	Colchester United	Crewe
	Naylor 2', 39', 63', 77', 86'; McKearney 23'; Clarkson 45'	Report	English 22'	Stadium: Gresty Road; Attendance: 3,250; Referee: J Watson

1 May 1993 40	Colchester United	1–0	Scunthorpe United	Colchester
15:00 BST	Abrahams 29'	Report		Stadium: Layer Road; Attendance: 3,421; Referee: R Bigger

4 May 1993 41	Darlington	1–0	Colchester United	Darlington
	Reed 36'	Report		Stadium: Feethams; Attendance: 2,007; Referee: T West

8 May 1993 42	Wrexham	4–3	Colchester United	Wrexham
	Connolly 10'; Betts 43' (o.g.); Watkin 63', 89'	Report	Hardy 54' (o.g.); Bennett 68'; Kinsella 79'	Stadium: Racecourse Ground; Attendance: 9,705; Referee: David Allison

=== League Cup ===
18 August 1992 1st round 1st leg	Colchester United	1–1	Brighton & Hove Albion	Colchester
19:30 BST	English 74'	Report	Wilkins 64'	Stadium: Layer Road; Attendance: 3,814; Referee: Ian Borrett

26 August 1992 1st round 2nd leg	Brighton & Hove Albion	1–0	Colchester United	Hove
19:45 BST	Wilkins 61'	Report		Stadium: Goldstone Ground; Attendance: 4,125; Referee: Alf Buksh
Note: Brighton won 2–1 on aggregate.

=== Conference Shield ===
6 October 1992 Final	Wycombe Wanderers	3–0	Colchester United	High Wycombe
	Scott 34'; Casey 57', 79'	Report		Stadium: Adams Park; Attendance: 3,309; Referee: P Scobie

=== FA Cup ===
14 November 1992 1st round	Colchester United	4–0	Slough Town	Colchester
	Sorrell 16'; Bennett 42', 90'; Ball 85'	Report		Stadium: Layer Road; Attendance: 3,858; Referee: Paul Alcock

5 December 1992 2nd round	Gillingham	1–1	Colchester United	Gillingham
	Crown 15'	Report	McGavin 65'; Sorrell (yellow card) 90' (red card)	Stadium: Priestfield Stadium; Attendance: 5,319; Referee: Kelvin Morton

16 December 1992 2nd round replay	Colchester United	2–3	Gillingham	Colchester
19:45 GMT	Ball 88', 90'	Report	Forster 7'; Arnott 17'; Henry 45' (pen.)	Stadium: Layer Road; Attendance: 4,440; Referee: Kelvin Morton

=== Football League Trophy ===
Group 1
Team	Pld	W	D	L	GF	GA	GD	Pts	Qualification
Northampton Town	2	2	0	0	4	2	+2	6	Qualified for next round
Barnet	2	1	0	1	5	4	+1	3	Qualified for next round
Colchester United	2	0	0	2	3	6	−3	0	

1 December 1992 1st round (southern section)	Colchester United	1–2	Northampton Town	Colchester
19:45 GMT	Grainger 27' (pen.)	Report	Beavon 45' (pen.); Brown 63'	Stadium: Layer Road; Attendance: 1,454; Referee: D Axcell

21 December 1992 1st round (southern section)	Barnet	4–2	Colchester United	Chipping Barnet
	Evans 3'; Carter 13'; Stein 34'; Hunt 54'	Report	Ball 57'; Cook 58'	Stadium: Underhill Stadium; Attendance: 1,193; Referee: Dermot Gallagher

== Squad statistics ==
=== Appearances and goals ===
No.	Pos	Nat	Player	Total		Third Division		FA Cup		League Cup		Football League Trophy		Conference Shield	
No.	Pos	Nat	Player	Apps	Goals	Apps	Goals	Apps	Goals	Apps	Goals	Apps	Goals	Apps	Goals
	GK	(England) ENG	Nathan Munson	1	0	1	0	0	0	0	0	0	0	0	0
	DF	(England) ENG	Simon Betts	25	0	23	0	0+1	0	0	0	1	0	0	0
	DF	(England) ENG	Peter Cawley	27	3	22+2	3	2	0	0	0	0	0	1	0
	FW	(England) ENG	Tony English	39	2	30+3	1	3	0	2	1	1	0	0	0
	DF	(England) ENG	Martin Grainger	35	4	28+3	3	2	0	1	0	1	1	0	0
	DF	(England) ENG	Andy Partner	3	0	0+1	0	0	0	0	0	1	0	0+1	0
	DF	(England) ENG	Paul Roberts	50	1	42	1	3	0	2	0	2	0	1	0
	MF	(England) ENG	Steve Ball	28	8	19+5	4	2	3	0	0	1	1	1	0
	MF	(England) ENG	Jason Cook	39	2	30+4	1	2	0	1	0	1	1	1	0
	MF	(Republic of Ireland) IRL	Mark Kinsella	45	6	37+1	6	3	0	2	0	0+1	0	1	0
	MF	(England) ENG	Nicky Smith	50	4	42	4	3	0	2	0	2	0	1	0
	FW	(England) ENG	Paul Abrahams	26	6	9+14	6	0	0	0+1	0	1	0	1	0
	FW	(England) ENG	Gary Bennett	45	10	30+8	8	1+1	2	2	0	1+1	0	1	0
	FW	(England) ENG	Julian Hazel	4	0	2	0	0	0	1	0	1	0	0	0
	FW	(England) ENG	Robert Hopkins	14	1	13+1	1	0	0	0	0	0	0	0	0
	FW	(England) ENG	Roy McDonough	31	9	21+4	9	3	0	2	0	1	0	0	0
	FW	(England) ENG	Steve McGavin	43	10	35+2	9	3	1	0	0	2	0	1	0
Players who appeared for Colchester who left during the season
	GK	(England) ENG	Fred Barber	10	0	10	0	0	0	0	0	0	0	0	0
	GK	(England) ENG	Carl Emberson	13	0	13	0	0	0	0	0	0	0	0	0
	GK	(England) ENG	Ron Green	8	0	4	0	3	0	0	0	1	0	0	0
	GK	(England) ENG	Alasdair Monk	2	0	0	0	0	0	0	0	1	0	1	0
	GK	(England) ENG	Paul Newell	16	0	14	0	0	0	2	0	0	0	0	0
	DF	(England) ENG	Paul Flowers	3	0	2+1	0	0	0	0	0	0	0	0	0
	DF	(England) ENG	Darren Oxbrow	21	4	12+4	4	0+1	0	2	0	1	0	1	0
	DF	(Scotland) SCO	Ian Phillips	2	0	0+1	0	0	0	0	0	1	0	0	0
	MF	(England) ENG	Robbie Devereux	8	0	3+3	0	0	0	1	0	1	0	0	0
	MF	(England) ENG	Tony Sorrell	8	2	4+1	1	3	1	0	0	0	0	0	0
	FW	(England) ENG	Warren Donald	15	0	8+2	0	0	0	2	0	1+1	0	0+1	0
	FW	(England) ENG	Dean Martin	8	2	8	2	0	0	0	0	0	0	0	0

=== Goalscorers ===
Place	Nationality	Position	Name	Third Division	FA Cup	League Cup	Football League Trophy	Conference Shield	Total
1	(England)	WG	Gary Bennett	8	2	0	0	0	10
1	(England)	FW	Steve McGavin	9	1	0	0	0	10
3	(England)	FW	Roy McDonough	9	0	0	0	0	9
4	(England)	MF	Steve Ball	4	3	0	1	0	8
5	(England)	FW/WG	Paul Abrahams	6	0	0	0	0	6
5	(Republic of Ireland)	MF	Mark Kinsella	6	0	0	0	0	6
7	(England)	FB	Martin Grainger	3	0	0	1	0	4
7	(England)	CB	Darren Oxbrow	4	0	0	0	0	4
7	(England)	LM	Nicky Smith	4	0	0	0	0	4
10	(England)	CB	Peter Cawley	3	0	0	0	0	3
11	(England)	MF	Jason Cook	1	0	0	1	0	2
11	(England)	DF/MF	Tony English	1	0	1	0	0	2
11	(England)	FW	Dean Martin	2	0	0	0	0	2
11	(England)	MF	Tony Sorrell	1	1	0	0	0	2
15	(England)	WG	Robert Hopkins	1	0	0	0	0	1
15	(England)	DF	Paul Roberts	1	0	0	0	0	1
			Own goals	4	0	0	0	0	4
			TOTALS	67	7	1	3	0	78

=== Disciplinary record ===
Nationality	Position	Name	Third Division		FA Cup		League Cup		Football League Trophy		Conference Shield		Total	
Nationality	Position	Name	Booked	Sent off (straight red)	Booked	Sent off (straight red)	Booked	Sent off (straight red)	Booked	Sent off (straight red)	Booked	Sent off (straight red)	Booked	Sent off (straight red)
(England)	FW	Roy McDonough	1	2	0	0	0	0	0	0	0	0	1	2
(England)	MF	Tony Sorrell	0	0	1	1	0	0	0	0	0	0	1	1
		TOTALS	1	2	1	1	0	0	0	0	0	0	2	3

=== Clean sheets ===
Number of games goalkeepers kept a clean sheet.

Place	Nationality	Player	Third Division	FA Cup	League Cup	Football League Trophy	Conference Shield	Total
1	(England)	Fred Barber	5	0	0	0	0	5
1	(England)	Carl Emberson	5	0	0	0	0	5
3	(England)	Ron Green	1	1	0	0	0	2
4	(England)	Paul Newell	1	0	0	0	0	1
		TOTALS	12	1	0	0	0	13

=== Player debuts ===
Players making their first-team Colchester United debut in a fully competitive match.

Position	Nationality	Player	Date	Opponent	Ground	Notes
MF	(England)	Robbie Devereux	15 August 1992	Lincoln City	Layer Road	(Note: Second debut for the club)
GK	(England)	Paul Newell	15 August 1992	Lincoln City	Layer Road	
CB	(England)	Darren Oxbrow	15 August 1992	Lincoln City	Layer Road	
MF	(England)	Steve Ball	19 September 1992	York City	Bootham Crescent	
CB	(England)	Peter Cawley	6 October 1992	Wycombe Wanderers	Adams Park	
GK	(England)	Alasdair Monk	6 October 1992	Wycombe Wanderers	Adams Park	
CB	(England)	Peter Cawley	30 October 1992	Wrexham	Layer Road	
GK	(England)	Ron Green	7 November 1992	Cardiff City	Ninian Park	
MF	(England)	Tony Sorrell	7 November 1992	Cardiff City	Ninian Park	
FB	(England)	Simon Betts	16 December 1992	Gillingham	Layer Road	
GK	(England)	Carl Emberson	18 December 1992	Gillingham	Priestfield Stadium	
FW	(England)	Dean Martin	2 January 1993	Walsall	Bescot Stadium	
WG	(England)	Robert Hopkins	20 February 1993	Shrewsbury Town	Gay Meadow	
CB	(England)	Paul Flowers	12 March 1993	Cardiff City	Layer Road	
GK	(England)	Fred Barber	20 March 1993	Carlisle United	Brunton Park	
GK	(England)	Nathan Munson	8 May 1993	Wrexham	Racecourse Ground	

== See also ==
- List of Colchester United F.C. seasons
