= 1997 Football League Trophy final =

1997 Football League Trophy Final
1997 Auto Windscreens Shield Final
- Event: 1996–97 Football League Trophy
Carlisle United	Colchester United
0	0
- Carlisle United won 4–3 on penalties
- Date: 20 April 1997
- Venue: Wembley Stadium, London
- Man of the Match: Stéphane Pounewatchy (Carlisle United)
- Referee: J Kirkby (Sheffield)
- Attendance: 45,077

The 1997 Football League Trophy Final, known as the 1997 Auto Windscreens Shield Final for sponsorship reasons, was the final match of the 1996–97 Football League Trophy. It was the 14th season of the competition for teams from the Second and Third Divisions of the Football League. The match was held on 20 April 1997 at Wembley Stadium, London, and was contested by Carlisle United, featuring in their second final in the competition and looking for their first win, and Colchester United, who were appearing in the final for the first time.

Each club needed to progress through five rounds to reach the final, which included a two-legged area final. Carlisle's progress to the final saw them concede just one goal in their six games, scoring twelve in the process. This included a 0–0 draw in the second leg of their area final against Stockport County. Colchester, however, scored ten goals and conceded five, twice requiring extra time to defeat their opponents. Their run included a 2–0 defeat against Peterborough United in their area final first-leg before overcoming them 3–0 in the home encounter after extra-time.

After a goalless 90 minutes in the final, the match went to extra time, which also finished without a goal. Carlisle won the game following a penalty shoot-out, with a score of 4–3.

== Route to the final ==
=== Carlisle United ===
Third Division side Carlisle began their Football League Trophy campaign on 10 December 1996 at home to Rochdale in the North section of the competition. They defeated their opponents 2–0, before being drawn against Hull City for the second round. They comfortably dismissed Hull 4–0 on 28 January 1997, before they were handed an area quarter-final against Second Division York City at Bootham Crescent on 4 February. Again, Carlisle progressed without conceding as they won 2–0. On 18 February, Carlisle again defeated higher league opposition as they beat Shrewsbury Town 2–1 at Gay Meadow to reach the area final. In the area final first-leg held on 18 March, Carlisle again defeated second division opposition by winning 2–0 against Stockport County. A 0–0 draw in the reverse tie one week later handed the Cumbrians a 2–0 aggregate win to hand them a place in the final against Colchester United.

=== Colchester United ===
For Colchester United, the road to the final began in Cambridge on 10 December 1996, when Steve Whitton scored an 89th-minute winner against Cambridge United. In the second round, held on 7 January 1997, Second Division Millwall hosted Third Division Colchester. Stevie Crawford put the hosts ahead after 10 minutes, but Tony Adcock equalised on 53 minutes. Millwall went 2–1 up on 76 minutes through Dave Savage before Adcock scored his second goal of the game two minutes from time to send the tie into extra time. Just three minutes into extra time, Paul Buckle scored a golden goal for the visitors, his first goal for the club, to put them into the area quarter-finals.

Colchester met Brentford in the southern quarter-final on 28 January when they saw off further Second Division after Paul Abrahams' 35th-minute goal proved the difference between the two sides. The area semi-final had Colchester drawn at home for the first time in the competition. Held on 18 February, Colchester's loanee goalkeeper was sent off after just 22 minutes of play against Northampton Town, meaning midfielder Richard Wilkins had to take over goalkeeping duties. With the score goalless at half-time, defender Peter Cawley was sent on as a substitute and took over in goal. Colchester went 1–0 ahead in the 66th minute from a David Greene goal, but Northampton struck back one minute later through Dave Martin. Paul Buckle reinstated the U's advantage 15 minutes from the full-time whistle to put his side into the area final.

In the first leg of the area final against Peterborough United on 11 March, Colchester fell to a 2–0 defeat at London Road, but in the return leg at Layer Road on 18 March, Colchester scored two goals, one from Chris Fry in the first half and one from Paul Buckle in the second-half, to send the game to extra time. With a man advantage after Peterborough had Ken Charlery sent off for a second bookable offence, Paul Abrahams scored the golden goal that would put the Essex side through to the Wembley national final.

== Pre-match ==
The match between Carlisle United and Colchester United would be the 30th competitive match between the two sides, and their first meeting in the competition. As league rivals, Carlisle had beaten Colchester 3–0 at Brunton Park the same season on 1 October 1996, but were held to a 1–1 draw on 18 January 1997 at Layer Road. Until the game, both sides had an equal number of wins against one another, eleven, with six draws. Colchester's last victory over Carlisle had been in November 1993 when they won 2–1 at Layer Road.

Prior to the game, Carlisle chairman Michael Knighton threatened to withdraw his team from the final of the competition in protest to Carlisle's share of the television rights money. The Football League responded to his complaints by saying that any such action would result in Carlisle United being thrown out of the league.

== Match ==
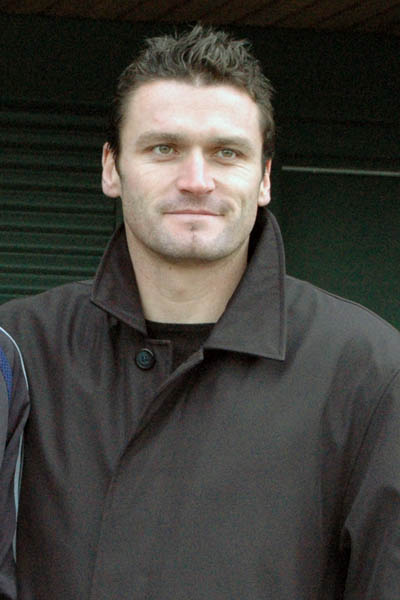
Carlisle United goalkeeper Tony Caig saved two penalties in the shoot-out.

The encounter between the two sides drew a Wembley crowd of 45,077 on matchday, and it was also broadcast on Sky Sports. The game for 90 minutes of normal time failed to produce many incidents or excitement, although Allan Smart was withdrawn through injury on 24 minutes and replaced by Rod Thomas for Carlisle. Colchester made one substitution in the initial 90 minutes as Adam Locke replaced David Gregory with five minutes remaining.

With the full-time whistle having been blown by the referee, the first real chance fell to Carlisle five minutes into extra time, when Thomas and Warren Aspinall combined to open up the Colchester defence, but Aspinall slipped and the chance was lost. Shortly afterward, Thomas was replaced by young striker Matt Jansen, becoming the second substitution of extra time after Colchester had replaced Paul Abrahams with Karl Duguid on 91 minutes.

Colchester then introduced midfielder Chris Fry for defender Paul Gibbs at half-time in extra time, but as penalties loomed, Colchester had a great opportunity to win the game. Just fifteen seconds from time, Mark Sale's cross reached full-back Joe Dunne at the far-post, but he put his shot high over the bar.

In the shoot-out, Colchester captain Richard Wilkins stepped up to convert the first spot-kick, before Carlisle's Paul Conway equalised. Tony Adcock squeezed the ball in past Carlisle goalkeeper Tony Caig who had dived the right way. Carl Emberson saved Owen Archdeacon's penalty kick, before David Greene gave his side a 3–1 advantage. Dean Walling then scored for Carlisle as Colchester substitute Karl Duguid stepped up to take his penalty. His effort was tipped onto the post by Caig and saved, a moment which saw a young Duguid break down into tears. Warren Aspinall levelled the score at 3–3 with the next kick for Carlisle. Peter Cawley took Colchester's next penalty, which was again saved by Caig. With a chance to win the game with a conversion, Carlisle captain Steve Hayward scored to seal a 4–3 penalty shoot-out win for the club.

=== Details ===
20 April 1997

Carlisle United	0–0 (a.e.t.)	Colchester United
	Report
Penalties
Conway (penalty scored); Archdeacon (penalty missed); Walling (penalty scored); Aspinall (penalty scored); Hayward (penalty scored)	4–3	Wilkins (penalty scored); Adcock (penalty scored); Greene (penalty scored); Duguid (penalty missed); Cawley (penalty missed)

Wembley Stadium, London
Attendance: 45,077
Referee: J Kirkby (Sheffield)

GK	1	(England) Tony Caig
MF	2	(Republic of Ireland) Rory Delap
MF	3	(Scotland) Owen Archdeacon
DF	4	(Saint Kitts and Nevis) Dean Walling
DF	5	(England) Will Varty
DF	6	(France) Stéphane Pounewatchy
FW	7	(United States) Paul Conway	Booked
FW	8	(Scotland) Lee Peacock
FW	9	(Scotland) Allan Smart		(substituted off) 24'
MF	10	(England) Steve Hayward (c)	Booked
MF	11	(England) Warren Aspinall	Booked
Substitutes:
FW	12	(England) Rod Thomas		(substituted on) 24' (substituted off) 95'
FW	13	(England) Matt Jansen		(substituted on) 95'
MF	14	(England) Tony Hopper
Manager:
(England) Mervyn Day

GK	1	(England) Carl Emberson
DF	2	(Republic of Ireland) Joe Dunne	Booked
DF	3	(England) Paul Gibbs	Booked	(substituted off) 105'
MF	4	(England) David Gregory	Booked	(substituted off) 85'
DF	5	(Republic of Ireland) David Greene	Booked
DF	6	(England) Peter Cawley	Booked
MF	7	(England) Richard Wilkins (c)
FW	8	(England) Mark Sale
FW	9	(England) Steve Whitton
FW	10	(England) Tony Adcock
FW	11	(England) Paul Abrahams		(substituted off) 91'
Substitutes:
MF	12	(Wales) Chris Fry		(substituted on) 105'
MF	13	(England) Adam Locke		(substituted on) 85'
MF	14	(England) Karl Duguid		(substituted on) 91'
Manager:
(England) Steve Wignall

Man of the match

- (France) Stéphane Pounewatchy (Carlisle United)

Match rules

- 90 minutes.
- 30 minutes of extra time if necessary.
- Penalty shoot-out if scores still level.
- Maximum of three substitutions.
