= Tony Cook (footballer, born 1976) =

English footballer

Personal information
- Full name: Anthony Cook
- Date of birth: 17 September 1976 (age 50)
- Place of birth: Hemel Hempstead, England
- Position: Midfielder

Youth career
- Queens Park Rangers
- Colchester United

Senior career*
Years	Team	Apps	(Gls)
1994	Colchester United	2	(0)
- Berkhamsted Town
1995–1996	Wivenhoe Town	8	(0)
1996	Hemel Hempstead Town		
1996–1997	Chelmsford City	8	(0)
- Tring Athletic
Total		2	(0)
- * Club domestic league appearances and goals

Anthony Cook (born 17 September 1976) is an English former footballer who played in the Football League as a midfielder for Colchester United.

== Career ==
Born in Hemel Hempstead, Cook began his career at Queens Park Rangers when he was just 11 years old and then went on as a youth apprentice with Football League club Colchester United, making his debut for the first-team on 11 January 1994 in a Football League Trophy third round 1–0 defeat to Wycombe Wanderers, alongside fellow debutants Justin Booty, John Cheesewright and Grant Watts. He came on as a substitute for Booty. He made two appearances in the Football League, the first coming on 30 April 1994 in a 3–1 home victory over Doncaster Rovers, a match in which he started, and his final appearance came in the following game, a 2–0 away defeat to Carlisle United, coming on for Steve Ball.

After leaving Colchester, Cook went on to play for a number of non-league clubs including Berkhamsted Town, Wivenhoe Town, Hemel Hempstead Town, Chelmsford City and Tring Athletic.
