= Sean Campbell (footballer) =

English footballer

Personal information
- Full name: Sean Martin Campbell
- Date of birth: 31 December 1974 (age 51)
- Place of birth: Bristol, England
- Position: Winger

Youth career
- Colchester United

Senior career*
Years	Team	Apps	(Gls)
1993–1994	Colchester United	4	(0)
- Chelmsford City
- Harwich & Parkeston
1997-1998	Wivenhoe Town	12	(2)
2000-2003	Wivenhoe Town	57	(3)
- Clacton Town
Total		4	(0)
- * Club domestic league appearances and goals

Sean Martin Campbell (born 31 December 1974) is an English former footballer who played as a winger in the Football League for Colchester United.

== Career ==
Born in Bristol, Burman began his career with Colchester United after progressing through the club's youth system. He made his debut in a 2–1 defeat to Crewe Alexandra at Gresty Road on 21 August 1993, coming on as a substitute for Simon Betts. He played three further league games for the U's, his final appearance came as a substitute for Steve Brown in a 1–0 victory over Bury at Gigg Lane on 19 March 1994.

After leaving Colchester, Campbell went on to play for a number of Essex-based non-league teams including Chelmsford City, Harwich & Parkeston, Wivenhoe Town and Clacton Town.
