= Varty =

Varty is a surname. Notable people with the surname include:

- John Varty (born 1950), South African zoologist and conservationist
- Mike Varty (born 1952), American football player
- Rowan Varty (born 1986), Hong Kong rugby union player
- Will Varty (born 1976), English footballer
