= Nathan Munson =

English footballer and coach

Nathan Munson MBE
Personal information
- Full name: Nathan Wayne Munson
- Date of birth: 10 November 1974 (age 51)
- Place of birth: Colchester, Essex, England
- Height: 6 ft 0 in (1.83 m)
- Position: Goalkeeper

Youth career
- Colchester United

Senior career*
Years	Team	Apps	(Gls)
1992–1994	Colchester United	4	(0)
1993–94 &-1994–95	Wivenhoe Town	28	(0)
	Billericay Town	22	
2000–2002	Stanway Rovers	102	
2002–2005	Harwich & Parkeston	118	
2005–2006	Needham Market	51	
2006–2008	AFC Sudbury	92	(0)
2008	Brantham Athletic	16	
2008–2009	Harwich & Parkeston	28	
2009–2011	Brantham Athletic	4	
2011–2013	Leiston	3	(0)
2013	Needham Market	0	(0)
Total		460	(0)
- * Club domestic league appearances and goals

Nathan Wayne Munson MBE (born 10 November 1974) is an English former footballer who played in the Football League as a goalkeeper for Colchester United. He has also represented a number of non-League clubs, and has also served as goalkeeping coach at Needham Market.

== Career ==
Born in Colchester, Gilberd School student Munson was brought through the Colchester United youth system and was handed his first-team debut by Roy McDonough at the end of the 1992–93 season. The game against Wrexham finished 4–3 to the Welsh club, conceding an 89th-minute winner from Steve Watkin on 8 May 1993. His next appearance for the club came in bizarre circumstances as Colchester became the first club to have two goalkeepers sent off in the same fixture. The game against Hereford United on 16 October 1993 saw John Keeley sent off in the 43rd minute, the U's already 1–0 down from a Chris Pike goal. Roy McDonough covered in goal until half time, where he conceded another goal to Pike. Munson was brought on at half time but was sent off in the 68th minute after conceding to Chris Fry and Pike once again, giving him a hat-trick, scoring against three different goalkeepers in the same game. McDonough returned to goal following Munson's dismissal and conceded again, this time to Derek Hall in the 88th minute to result in a disastrous 5–0 loss.

Munson was to make only two further league appearances for the club, a 2–1 home win against Carlisle United, before playing his final U's game on 11 December 1993, a 4–2 defeat to Crewe Alexandra at Layer Road.

Following his release from Colchester, Munson joined a number of non-league clubs in the Colchester, Essex and Suffolk area, including Wivenhoe Town, Billericay Town, and Stanway Rovers F.C. He then joined the police force, representing both the English and British police at international level. He later signed for Harwich & Parkeston F.C., Needham Market and AFC Sudbury. He announced his retirement from playing on 15 November 2007, but took over as Sudbury's goalkeeping coach. He was called into action on a number of occasions due to other players being cup-tied, making a total of 92 appearances for the club. He left Sudbury in July 2008 to join Brantham Athletic, but returned to Harwich in October of the same year. For the 2009–10 season, he returned to Brantham in a player-coach capacity. He joined Leiston in May 2011, again acting mostly as goalkeeping coach but also made some appearances for the club when required. He returned to another former club, Needham Market in March 2013 as part of the coaching team alongside former Leiston manager Mark Morsley.

== Personal life ==
Munson was included in the 2016 New Year Honours list, receiving an MBE for his services to counter-terrorism while working for the Home Office as Detective Sergeant Hazardous Substances Industry Engagement Officer.
