= Dean Walling =

Footballer (born 1969)

Personal information
- Full name: Dean Anthony Walling
- Date of birth: 17 April 1969 (age 57)
- Place of birth: Leeds, England
- Position: Defender

Youth career
- 1986–1987: Leeds United

Senior career*
Years	Team	Apps	(Gls)
1987–1990	Rochdale	65	(8)
1990	Kitchener Spirit	24	(3)
1991	Franklin Grizzlies		
1991	Guiseley	2	(2)
1991–1997	Carlisle United	236	(22)
1997–1999	Lincoln City	38	(5)
1999–2001	Doncaster Rovers	42	(0)
2001	Northwich Victoria	14	(0)
2001–2002	Cambridge United	20	(0)
2002	Gainsborough Trinity		

International career
1999	Saint Kitts and Nevis	1	(0)
- * Club domestic league appearances and goals

Dean Anthony Walling (born 17 April 1969) is a former professional footballer. Although he started his career as a forward, he predominantly played as a centre-back. Born in Leeds, England, to parents from Saint Kitts, he played for the Saint Kitts and Nevis national team.

He was a key player in Carlisle's Third Division win in 1995, and helped the to a promotion from the same division in 1997. He was also one of Carlisle's scorers in the penalty shootout of the 1997 Football League Trophy final at Wembley Stadium, which Carlisle won on penalties after a 0–0 draw after 120 minutes.

He now runs a soccer club in Lincoln, coaching young players.

== Honours ==
Carlisle United

- Football League Third Division: 1994–95
- Football League Trophy: 1996–97; runner-up: 1994–95

Individual

- PFA Team of the Year: 1994–95 Third Division, 1996–97 Third Division, 1997–98 Third Division
