= Dennis Sorrell =

English footballer (1940–2019)

Personal information
- Full name: Dennis James Sorrell
- Date of birth: 7 October 1940
- Place of birth: Lambeth, England
- Date of death: 10 November 2019 (aged 79)
- Position: Left-half

Senior career*
Years	Team	Apps	(Gls)
–1957	Woodford Town		
1957–1962	Leyton Orient	37	(1)
1962–1964	Chelsea	3	(0)
1964–1967	Leyton Orient	74	(3)
1967–	Romford		
Total		114	(4)
- * Club domestic league appearances and goals

Dennis James Sorrell (7 October 1940 – 10 November 2019) was an English professional footballer who played as a left-half in the Football League for Leyton Orient and Chelsea. He also played for a number of teams in non-League football, most notably Romford.

He was the uncle of former Maidstone United, Colchester United and Barnet footballer Tony Sorrell.

Sorrell died on 10 November 2019, aged 79, following a long battle with illness.
