= John Richardson (footballer, born 1966) =

English footballer

Personal information
- Full name: John Richardson
- Date of birth: 28 July 1966 (age 60)
- Place of birth: Durham, England
- Position: Forward

Senior career*
Years	Team	Apps	(Gls)
- Chesham United
1993	Colchester United	8	(0)
- Chesham United
Total		8	(0)
- * Club domestic league appearances and goals

John Richardson (born 28 July 1966) is an English former footballer who played in the Football League as a forward for Colchester United.

== Career ==
Born in Durham, Richardson signed for Third Division side Colchester United from Chesham United in September 1993 on a non-contract basis. He made his Football League debut on 25 September 1993, coming on as a substitute for player-manager Roy McDonough in a 4–1 win over Bury at Layer Road. He failed to score in any of his eight league games for Colchester, making his final appearance in a 4–2 home defeat to Crewe Alexandra on 11 December 1993, replacing Steve Ball. Richardson returned to non-league football with Chesham following his release.
