= Tim Allpress =

English footballer

Personal information
- Full name: Tim John Allpress
- Date of birth: 27 January 1971 (age 55)
- Place of birth: Hitchin, England
- Height: 6 ft 0 in (1.83 m)
- Position: Defender

Youth career
- Luton Town

Senior career*
Years	Team	Apps	(Gls)
1989–1993	Luton Town	1	(0)
1991–1992	→ Preston North End (loan)	9	(0)
1993	Boston United	4	(0)
1993	Bayer Uerdingen		
1993–1995	Colchester United	34	(0)
- Hitchin Town
- Enterprise
- Hitchin Town
1999–2000	St Albans City		
2000–2003	Hitchin Town		
Total		48	(0)
- * Club domestic league appearances and goals

Tim John Allpress (born 27 January 1971) is an English former footballer who played as a defender in the Football League for Luton Town, Preston North End and Colchester United, and in the German 2. Bundesliga for Bayer Uerdingen.

== Career ==
Born in Hitchin, Allpress began his career with Luton Town, coming through the youth ranks. After signing his first professional deal in July 1989, he made only one appearance for the club, and was later sent on loan to Preston North End in 1991. Allpress made nine appearances between his debut on 2 November 1991, a 3–2 defeat at Chester, and 1 January 1992, a 1–0 defeat at Bournemouth. He was released from his Luton contract when the club were relegated from the First Division. He joined non-league side Boston United in 1993, making four league appearances, before moving to Germany to play for Bayer Uerdingen.

Allpress returned to England after his spell in Germany to sign for Colchester United in August 1993 under Roy McDonough, who had seen him playing for Luton Reserves. He made his debut for the club as a substitute for Simon Betts in a 2–1 League Cup defeat to Fulham at Craven Cottage on 17 August 1993. Allpress made 34 Football League appearances for Colchester between 1993 and 1995, but was released by new manager George Burley in March 1995.

Following his release from Colchester, Allpress dropped out of the Football League to join hometown club Hitchin Town for a brief spell. He then moved to Hong Kong-based club Enterprise before returning to England and Hitchin. He later signed for St Albans City in 1999, but once again departed to Hitchin for a third spell, making more than 250 appearances for the club. He was named the supporters' 'Player of the Year' for the 2000–01 season.

== Personal life ==
Outside of football, Allpress is a constable in the Metropolitan Police Service. He featured in a BBC documentary about the notorious Broadwater Farm riot in North London in 1985, focussing on the changes to the area 20 years on, which at the time of the documentary was Allpress' beat where he worked as a community officer alongside Winston Silcott.
