= Justin Gentle =

English footballer

Personal information
- Full name: Justin David Gentle
- Date of birth: 6 June 1974 (age 52)
- Place of birth: Enfield, London, England
- Height: 1.70 m (5 ft 7 in)
- Position: Forward

Youth career
- Wimbledon
- Swindon Town

Senior career*
Years	Team	Apps	(Gls)
?–1992	Boreham Wood		
1992–1994	Luton Town	0	(0)
1994	Colchester United	2	(0)
1994–1995	Chesham United		
1995–1997	Enfield		
1997–1999	St Albans City	81	(11)
1999	Dagenham & Redbridge		
1999–2001	Billericay Town		
2002	Harlow Town		
Total		83	(11)
- * Club domestic league appearances and goals

Justin David Gentle (born 6 June 1974) is an English former footballer who played as a forward in the Football League for Colchester United.

== Career ==
Born in Enfield, London, Gentle played for non-league Boreham Wood before joining Luton Town. He failed to make the first-team at Luton, and moved to Colchester United. He made his Football League debut on 30 April 1994, coming on as a substitute for Tony Cook in a 3–1 home win over Doncaster Rovers. His final professional game was to come in the following game, coming on as a substitute for player-manager Roy McDonough who was also playing in his final game for the club. The away match at Carlisle United ended in a 2–0 defeat for the U's.

After leaving Colchester, Gentle played for Chesham United, Enfield, St Albans City, Dagenham & Redbridge and Billericay Town.
