= Tony Hopper =

English footballer

Personal information
- Date of birth: 31 May 1976
- Place of birth: Carlisle, England
- Date of death: 9 October 2018 (aged 42)
- Position: Midfielder

Senior career*
Years	Team	Apps	(Gls)
1992–2002	Carlisle United	100	(1)
1993–1994	→ Barrow (loan)	6	(1)
2000–2001	→ Bohemians (loan)	15	(2)
2002	Barrow	5	(0)
2002–2004	Workington	27	(6)
2005	Northbank		
2005–2010	Workington		
2012–2015	Celtic Nation		
- * Club domestic league appearances and goals

Tony Hopper (31 May 1976 – 9 October 2018) was an English professional footballer who played as a midfielder.

Hopper began his career at Carlisle United, where he spent 10 years and made 100 appearances scoring 1 goal. He was an unused substitute for the 1997 Football League Trophy Final at Wembley when Carlisle defeated Colchester United on penalties following a 0–0 draw. He also appeared in the famous Jimmy Glass game against Plymouth Argyle, in which the goalkeeper scored in the 94th minute to keep Carlisle United in the Football League.

Roddy Collins brought him to Bohemians on loan in August 2000. He made his debut away to UCD soon after signing. Though much maligned during his time at the club, he scored a vital goal in December of that year in a 1–0 win over Longford Town. He left the club a month later to return to England. His winner against Longford would prove crucial as Bohemians went on to win the league by 2 points.

He also played for Barrow and Workington.

In November 2012 he joined Celtic Nation until the end of the season. In January 2017, Hopper was diagnosed with motor neurone disease and he was the guest of honour at Carlisle United's game against Portsmouth. A fundraising page was set up in his name to help fight back against this disease.

He died on 9 October 2018 at the age of 42.

A minute's applause was held before Carlisle's match with Morecambe at Brunton Park as a tribute to him.

== Honours ==
Carlisle United

- Football League Trophy: 1996–97
