= Alasdair Monk =

English footballer

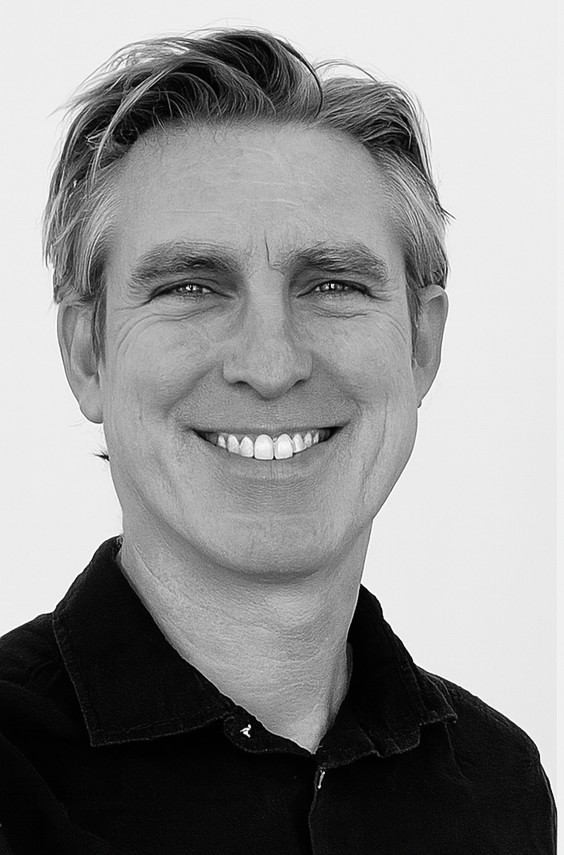

Personal information
- Full name: Alasdair Charles Monk
- Date of birth: 8 November 1972 (age 53)
- Place of birth: Epsom, England
- Height: 6 ft 5 in (1.96 m)
- Position: Goalkeeper

Youth career
- 1989-1991: Everton

Senior career*
Years	Team	Apps	(Gls)
1991-1992	IFK Stromstad	10	
1991–1992	Norwich City		
1992–1993	Colchester United		
- * Club domestic league appearances and goals

Alasdair Charles Monk (born 8 November 1972) is an English former footballer who played as a goalkeeper for Colchester United. He began his career at Everton and went onto play for Swedish club IFK Stromstad and later returned to England joining Norwich City.

== Career ==
Born in Epsom, Monk began his career at Everton, from where he later joined Swedish club IFK Stromstad. He returned to England joining Norwich City, appearing for the reserve team. He was then brought in at Colchester United under Roy McDonough. He made first team appearances in a Colchester shirt during a 4–2 Associate Members Cup defeat to Barnet on 21 December 1992 at Underhill. He also appeared in a Conference Shield match on 6 October 1992 against Conference runners-up in the previous season Wycombe Wanderers. The game was an annual trophy held between the winner of the Conference and the FA Trophy, but as Colchester had completed the double, Wycombe were invited to face the U's. The match resulted in a 3–0 defeat.
