= Paul Newell =

English footballer

Personal information
- Full name: Paul Clayton Newell
- Date of birth: 23 February 1969 (age 57)
- Place of birth: Woolwich, England
- Height: 6 ft 1 in (1.85 m)
- Position: Goalkeeper

Youth career
- Southend United

Senior career*
Years	Team	Apps	(Gls)
1987–1989	Southend United	15	(0)
1990–1994	Leyton Orient	61	(0)
1992–1993	→ Colchester United (loan)	14	(0)
1994–1995	Barnet	16	(0)
1995–1997	Darlington	41	(0)
- Sittingbourne
- Northampton Town
1998–1999	St Albans City	36	(0)
1999–2000	Dagenham & Redbridge		
2000–2001	Billericay Town		
2000–2001	→ Hendon (loan)		
2001	→ Grays Athletic (loan)	4	(0)
2001–2002	Canvey Island		
- Aveley
- Ford United
- * Club domestic league appearances and goals

Paul Clayton Newell (born 23 February 1969) is an English former professional footballer who played as a goalkeeper.

== Career ==
Newell made 147 appearances for Southend United, Leyton Orient, Colchester United, Barnet and Darlington in the Football League between the 1987–88 and 1996–97 seasons. He went on to play non-league football for clubs including Sittingbourne, St Albans City, Dagenham & Redbridge, Billericay Town, Hendon, Canvey Island, Aveley and Ford United, and was on the books of Northampton Town without playing for the first team.

== Honours ==
Darlington

- Football League Third Division play-off runners-up: 1995–96
