= Justin Booty =

English footballer

Personal information
- Full name: Justin Booty
- Date of birth: 2 June 1976 (age 50)
- Place of birth: Colchester, England
- Height: 1.80 m (5 ft 11 in)
- Position: Forward

Youth career
- Colchester United

Senior career*
Years	Team	Apps	(Gls)
1993–1994	Colchester United	1	(0)
- Braintree Town
1995-1998	Wivenhoe Town	88	(34)
Total		1	(0)
- * Club domestic league appearances and goals

Justin Booty (born 2 June 1976) is an English former footballer who played as a forward in the Football League for Colchester United.

== Career ==
Born in Colchester, Booty began his playing career with hometown club Colchester United. During his time in the Colchester youth team, he scored a double hat-trick in 1992, only the third under-18 player to achieve this feat. After impressing at youth level, he made his first-team debut on 11 January 1994 in a 1–0 home defeat to Wycombe Wanderers in the Associate Members' Cup.

His first and only appearance in the Football League came four days later on 15 January in a 1–0 home victory over Hereford United, coming on as a substitute for Grant Watts. Following his exit from Colchester, Booty joined Braintree Town and later Wivenhoe Town.
