= Grant Morrow =

Scottish footballer

Personal information
- Full name: Grant Ralph Morrow
- Date of birth: 4 October 1970 (age 56)
- Place of birth: Glasgow, Scotland
- Height: 5 ft 10 in (1.78 m)
- Position: Forward

Youth career
- Rowntree Mackintosh

Senior career*
| Years | Team | Apps | (Gls) |
| 1989–1993 | Doncaster Rovers | 64 | (7) |
| 1993 | Colchester United | 1 | (0) |
| 1993–1994 | Boston United | 18 | (5) |
| 1994–1999 | Gainsborough Trinity | | |
| 2000 | Bradford Park Avenue | | |
- * Club domestic league appearances and goals

Grant Ralph Morrow (born 4 October 1970) is a Scottish former footballer who played in the Football League as a forward for Doncaster Rovers and Colchester United.

== Career ==
Born in Glasgow, Morrow began his footballing career with Rowntree Mackintosh, where he was spotted by Doncaster Rovers, subsequently signing for the club in July 1989. He made his debut for the club in a 2–1 Fourth Division win over Exeter City on 20 January 1990. He made 64 league appearances and scored seven goals in his time at Belle Vue before signing for Colchester United in August 1993.

Signed by Roy McDonough, Morrow suffered cartilage damage in his only appearance for the club having been brought on as a substitute for Gary Bennett during a 3–2 win over Northampton Town at Layer Road.

Morrow was to never play in the Football League again, but did however join Boston United later on in the 1993–94 season, making 14 appearances for the club before joining Gainsborough Trinity. With Gainsborough, he scored the winning goal against former club Boston in the final of the Northern Premier League Challenge Cup in 1997.

He ended his career with Bradford Park Avenue in 2000.

== Honours ==
Gainsborough Trinity

- 1996–97 Northern Premier League Challenge Cup winner

All honours referenced by:
