= Gary Chapman (footballer, born 1964) =

English footballer

Personal information
- Date of birth: 1 May 1964 (age 62)
- Place of birth: Bradford, England
- Position: Striker

Senior career*
Years	Team	Apps	(Gls)
- Frickley Athletic
1988–1990	Bradford City	5	(0)
1990–1991	Notts County	25	(4)
1991	→ Mansfield Town (loan)	6	(0)
1991–1992	Exeter City	24	(5)
1992–1993	Torquay United	8	(0)
1993–1995	Darlington	74	(9)
- Emley
Total		142	(18)
- * Club domestic league appearances and goals

Gary Chapman (born 1 May 1964) is an English former professional footballer who played as a striker.

== Career ==
Born in Bradford, Chapman played for Frickley Athletic, Bradford City, Notts County, Mansfield Town, Exeter City, Torquay United, Darlington and Emley.
