= 1996–97 Football League Trophy =

Auto Windscreens Shields Trophy

Tournament details
- Country: England; Wales

The Football League Trophy 1996–97, known as the Auto Windscreens Shield 1996–97 for sponsorship reasons, was the 16th staging of the Football League Trophy, a knock-out competition for English football clubs in Second and Third Division. The winners were Carlisle United and the runners-up were Colchester United.

The competition began on 7 December 1996 and ended with the final on 20 April 1997 at the Wembley Stadium.

In the first round, there were two sections: North and South. In the following rounds each section gradually eliminates teams in knock-out fashion until each has a winning finalist. At this point, the two winning finalists face each other in the combined final for the honour of the trophy.

== First round ==
Crewe Alexandra, Lincoln City, Mansfield Town, Scunthorpe United, Shrewsbury Town, Wigan Athletic, Wrexham and York City from the North section all received byes.

Barnet, Bristol City, Exeter City, Northampton Town, Peterborough United, Torquay United, Walsall and Watford from the South section all received byes.

=== Northern Section ===
Date	Home team	Score	Away team
9 December	Chesterfield	0–2	Preston North End
10 December	Bury	3 – 1	Darlington
10 December	Carlisle United	2–0	Rochdale
10 December	Doncaster Rovers	1–2	Stockport County
10 December	Hartlepool United	0–2	Burnley
10 December	Hull City	3–1	Chester City
10 December	Rotherham United	0 – 1	Blackpool
10 December	Scarborough	0–1	Notts County

=== Southern Section ===
Date	Home team	Score	Away team
7 December	Hereford United	0–4	Millwall
10 December	Bristol Rovers	1–2	Brentford
10 December	Cambridge United	0–1	Colchester United
10 December	Gillingham	1 – 2	Cardiff City
10 December	Luton Town	2–1	Leyton Orient
10 December	Plymouth Argyle	2–0	Bournemouth
17 December	Brighton & Hove Albion	3 – 2	Fulham
8 January	Swansea City	1 – 1	Wycombe Wanderers
Swansea City won 6 – 5 on penalties

== Second round ==
=== Northern Section ===
Date	Home team	Score	Away team
13 January	Bury	6–0	Mansfield Town
14 January	Blackpool	4–0	Lincoln City
14 January	Shrewsbury Town	3 – 2	Wigan Athletic
21 January	York City	1–0	Preston North End
28 January	Carlisle United	4–0	Hull City
28 January	Scunthorpe United	1 – 1	Notts County
Scunthorpe United won 4 – 2 on penalties
28 January	Wrexham	0–1	Crewe Alexandra
4 February	Burnley	0–1	Stockport County

=== Southern Section ===
Date	Home team	Score	Away team
7 January	Brentford	2 – 1	Barnet
7 January	Millwall	2 – 3	Colchester United
7 January	Watford	2–1	Torquay United
14 January	Cardiff City	1 – 1	Exeter City
Exeter City won 4 – 2 on penalties
14 January	Plymouth Argyle	1–0	Brighton & Hove Albion
21 January	Peterborough United	2–0	Walsall
21 January	Swansea City	0–1	Bristol City
4 February	Northampton Town	1–0	Luton Town

== Quarter-finals ==
=== Northern Section ===
Date	Home team	Score	Away team
4 February	Crewe Alexandra	1–0	Blackpool
4 February	York City	0–2	Carlisle United
11 February	Bury	1 – 2	Stockport County
11 February	Shrewsbury Town	2 – 1	Scunthorpe United

=== Southern Section ===
Date	Home team	Score	Away team
28 January	Brentford	0–1	Colchester United
28 January	Exeter City	0–1	Peterborough United
11 February	Plymouth Argyle	0–2	Northampton Town
11 February	Watford	2–1	Bristol City

== Area semi-finals ==
=== Northern Section ===
Date	Home team	Score	Away team
18 February	Shrewsbury Town	1–2	Carlisle United
4 March	Crewe Alexandra	1 – 1	Stockport County
Stockport County won 5 – 3 on penalties

=== Southern Section ===
Date	Home team	Score	Away team
18 February	Colchester United	2–1	Northampton Town
18 February	Watford	0–1	Peterborough United

== Area finals ==
=== Northern Area final ===
18 March 1997

Carlisle United	2–0	Stockport County
Archdeacon 56', 90' (pen.)

Brunton Park, Carlisle
Attendance: 7,057
25 March 1997

Stockport County	0–0	Carlisle United

Edgeley Park, Stockport
Attendance: 8,593

Carlisle United beat Stockport County 2–0 on aggregate.

=== Southern Area final ===
11 March 1997

Peterborough United	2–0	Colchester United
Otto 15'; Charlery 35'

London Road Stadium, Peterborough
Attendance: 4,556
18 March 1997

Colchester United	3 – 0 (a.e.t.)	Peterborough United
Fry 37'; Buckle 81'; Abrahams 99'

Layer Road, Colchester
Attendance: 4,705

Colchester United beat Peterborough United 3–2 on aggregate.

== Final ==
20 April 1997
13:30 BST

Carlisle United	0 – 0 (a.e.t.)	Colchester United
Penalties
Conway (penalty scored); Archdeacon (penalty missed); Walling (penalty scored); Aspinall (penalty scored); Hayward (penalty scored)	4–3	(penalty scored) Wilkins; (penalty scored) Adcock; (penalty scored) Greene; (penalty missed) Duguid; (penalty missed) Cawley

Wembley Stadium
Attendance: 45,077
Referee: J.Kirkby

CARLISLE UNITED:
GK	Tony Caig
DF	Dean Walling
DF	Will Varty
DF	Stéphane Pounewatchy
MF	Rory Delap
MF	Steve Hayward (c)	Booked
MF	Warren Aspinall	Booked
MF	Paul Conway	Booked
MF	Owen Archdeacon
FW	Allan Smart	(substituted off) 24'
FW	Lee Peacock
Substitutes:
MF	Tony Hopper
FW	Rod Thomas	(substituted on) 24' (substituted off) 95'
FW	Matt Jansen	(substituted on) 95'
Manager:
Mervyn Day

COLCHESTER UNITED:
GK	Carl Emberson
DF	Joe Dunne	Booked
DF	David Greene	Booked
DF	Peter Cawley	Booked
DF	Paul Gibbs	(yellow card) (substituted off) 105'
MF	David Gregory	(yellow card) (substituted off) 85'
MF	Richard Wilkins (c)
MF	Steve Whitton
MF	Paul Abrahams	(substituted off) 91'
FW	Tony Adcock
FW	Mark Sale
Substitute:
MF	Karl Duguid	(substituted on) 91'
MF	Chris Fry	(substituted on) 105'
MF	Adam Locke	(substituted on) 85'
Manager:
Steve Wignall

MATCH RULES

- 90 minutes.
- 30 minutes of extra-time if necessary.
- Penalty shoot-out if scores still level.
- Maximum of 3 substitutions.
