= Christian Hyslop =

English footballer

Personal information
- Full name: Christian Terence Hyslop
- Date of birth: 14 June 1972 (age 54)
- Place of birth: Watford, England
- Position: Full back

Youth career
- Southend United

Senior career*
| Years | Team | Apps | (Gls) |
| 1990–1993 | Southend United | 19 | (0) |
| 1993–1994 | → Northampton Town (loan) | 8 | (0) |
| 1994 | Colchester United | 8 | (0) |
| | Hendon | 5 | (0) |
- Chelmsford City
- Billericay Town
- Waterford United
- Baldock Town
- Harrow Borough
- * Club domestic league appearances and goals

Christian Terence Hyslop (born 14 June 1972) is an English former professional footballer who played in the Football League as a full back.

== Career ==
Born in Watford, Hyslop began his career at Southend United, where he made 19 appearances, and during this stint had a loan spell at Northampton Town, making eight league appearances. He moved to Colchester United in 1994 where he made eight appearances. He also played in non-league football for Hendon, Chelmsford City, Billericay Town, Baldock Town and Harrow Borough, as well as overseas in Australia and in the Republic of Ireland for Waterford. In the 2010–11 season, he was the Fitness Coach at Leyton Orient.

== Honours ==
=== Club ===
Southend United

- Football League Third Division Runner-up (1): 1990–91
