= Ollie Morah =

English footballer

Personal information
- Full name: Olisa Morah
- Date of birth: 3 September 1972 (age 54)
- Place of birth: Islington, England
- Position: Forward

Senior career*
Years	Team	Apps	(Gls)
????–1992	Tottenham Hotspur	0	(0)
1991–1992	→ Hereford United (loan)	2	(0)
1992	→ Swindon Town (loan)	0	(0)
1992	Swindon Town	0	(0)
1993–1994	Sutton United	?	(?)
1994–1996	Cambridge United	14	(2)
1994–1995	→Torquay United (loan)	2	(0)
1996–????	Welling United	73	(20)
- * Club domestic league appearances and goals

Olisa Morah (born 3 September 1972) is a former footballer who played for Hereford United, Cambridge United and Torquay United. As a schoolboy, he went to the FA School of Excellence at Lilleshall and represented England.

Currently, he is the Games & PE teacher at Loyola Prep School (Buckhurst Hill, Essex.)
