= Ron Green (footballer) =

English footballer

Personal information
- Full name: Ronald Rex Green
- Date of birth: 3 October 1956 (age 70)
- Place of birth: Birmingham, England
- Height: 6 ft 2 in (1.88 m)
- Position: Goalkeeper

Senior career*
Years	Team	Apps	(Gls)
????–1977	Alvechurch	?	(?)
1977–1984	Walsall	163	(0)
1984	Shrewsbury Town	19	(0)
1984–1986	Bristol Rovers	56	(0)
1986–1988	Scunthorpe United	78	(0)
1988–1989	Wimbledon	4	(0)
1988–1989	→ Shrewsbury Town (loan)	17	(0)
1989	→ Manchester City (loan)	0	(0)
1989–1991	Walsall	67	(0)
1991–1992	Kidderminster Harriers	?	(?)
1992	Colchester United	4	(0)
1992–1995	Bromsgrove Rovers	?	(?)
- * Club domestic league appearances and goals as of 15:23, 7 May 2018

Ronald Rex Green (born 3 October 1956) is a former professional footballer who played as a goalkeeper in the Football League.

== Career ==
Born in Birmingham, England, Green played for Football League teams including two spells at Walsall and Shrewsbury, and spells with Bristol Rovers, Scunthorpe, Wimbledon and Colchester. Green also appeared for a number of non-league teams.

== Honours ==
=== Club ===
Walsall

- Football League Fourth Division runner-up (1): 1979–80
