= Graham Bressington =

English footballer (born 1966)

Personal information
- Date of birth: 8 July 1966 (age 60)
- Place of birth: Slough, England
- Position: Midfielder

Senior career*
Years	Team	Apps	(Gls)
- Beaconsfield United
1985–1987	Wycombe Wanderers	62	(5)
1987–1993	Lincoln City	154	(7)
1993–1995	Southend United	48	(5)
1995–1996	Slough Town	6	(0)
1996–????	Chalfont St Peter		
2006	Marlow	1	
- * Club domestic league appearances and goals

Graham Bressington (born 8 July 1966) is an English former footballer.

== Career ==
Slough-born Bressington enjoyed a promising start to his career, being a member, alongside Kevin Keen and Mark West, of the High Wycombe Schools U15 side which won the ESFA Trophy in 1981 and enjoying spells with Chelsea and Arsenal as a junior. However, a professional career did not immediately materialise and Bressington began his career in non-league football with Beaconsfield United and Wycombe Wanderers, helping Wycombe to the Isthmian League title in the 1986–87 season.

Having impressed in a GM Vauxhall Conference match against Lincoln City, Bressington was signed by the Imps for £20,000 in November 1987 and went on to play his part in the club's GMVC Championship success, making 13 appearances in the competition.

He stayed with Lincoln City for a further five seasons, impressing as either a combative midfield player or a centre-half, winning the player of the season award for 1990/91 and being voted number 78 in Lincoln's list of 100 league legends in 2007. He was also badly affected by injuries and missed virtually the entire 1991/92 season.

Bressington linked up with Southend United, managed by the man who signed him for Lincoln City, Colin Murphy, for £25,000 in the summer of 1993 but once again, injuries curtailed his Football League outings during his time at Roots Hall and caused his retirement from the professional game in the summer of 1995. He made a handful of appearances for hometown club Slough Town at the beginning of the 1995–96 season but injuries again took their toll and he began to wind down his senior career. In July 1996, he moved on to Chalfont St Peter as a player-coach.

In March 2005 he agreed to help out Marlow's temporary manager Kevin Stone, becoming assistant manager in May 2005 when Stone was appointed manager on a permanent basis. The pair had previously held similar roles at Chalfont St Peter. He was even drafted into their first team for a game in March 2006 when, four months before his 40th birthday, he turned out in their match against Dunstable. Following Marlow's move from the Southern League Division 1 South & West across to the Midlands Division for the start of the 2008–2009 season, Bressington relinquished his role as assistant manager.
