= Rod Thomas (English footballer) =

English footballer

Personal information
- Date of birth: 10 October 1970 (age 56)
- Place of birth: London, England
- Height: 5 ft 6 in (1.68 m)
- Positions: Midfielder; forward

Senior career*
Years	Team	Apps	(Gls)
1988–1993	Watford	84	(9)
1992	→ Gillingham (loan)	8	(1)
1993–1997	Carlisle United	146	(16)
1997–1998	Chester City	44	(7)
1998–2001	Brighton & Hove Albion	48	(4)
Total		330	(37)

International career
1990	England U21	1	(0)
- * Club domestic league appearances and goals

Rod Thomas (born 10 October 1970) is an English former footballer.

He played in the 1997 Football League Trophy final as Carlisle emerged victorious.

== Honours ==
Carlisle United

- Football League Third Division: 1994–95; third-place promotion: 1996–97
- Football League Trophy: 1996–97; runner-up: 1994–95
