= Darren Oxbrow =

English footballer

Personal information
- Date of birth: 1 September 1969 (age 57)
- Place of birth: Ipswich, England
- Height: 6 ft 1 in (1.85 m)
- Position: Central defender

Senior career*
Years	Team	Apps	(Gls)
1988–1989	Ipswich Town	0	(0)
1989–1992	Maidstone United	85	(2)
1992–1993	Colchester United	24	(4)
1993	Barnet	1	(0)
1993–1996	Kettering Town	99	(8)
- * Club domestic league appearances and goals

Darren Oxbrow (born 1 September 1969) is an English former professional footballer who played for Maidstone United, Colchester United and Barnet.

Oxbrow was diagnosed with non-Hodgkin's lymphoma in 2022.
