= Tony Sorrell =

English footballer

Personal information
- Full name: Anthony Charles Sorrell
- Date of birth: 17 October 1966 (age 60)
- Place of birth: Hornchurch, England
- Position: Midfielder

Senior career*
Years	Team	Apps	(Gls)
- Barking
- Bishop's Stortford
1989–1991	Maidstone United	77	(11)
1992	Peterborough United	0	(0)
1992	Boston United	1	(0)
1992	Colchester United	5	(1)
1993	Barnet	8	(2)
1993	Wycombe Wanderers	1	(0)
1993–1994	Brentford	0	(0)
1994–1995	Dagenham & Redbridge	30	
	Romford	29	(2)
- * Club domestic league appearances and goals

Anthony Charles Sorrell (born 17 October 1966) is a former professional footballer who played in the Football League for Maidstone United, Colchester United and Barnet. He also played non-League football for Barking, Boston United and Dagenham & Redbridge.

== Personal life ==
He is the nephew of former Chelsea and Leyton Orient footballer Dennis Sorrell. After retiring from football he worked as the director of London Pro Group, Pro Rail Construction and Pro Fabrication Ltd. As of 2012 he resided in Hornchurch, Greater London.

== Honours ==
Maidstone United

- Football Conference: 1988–89
