= Mike Desborough =

English footballer

Personal information
- Full name: Michael Desborough
- Date of birth: 28 November 1969 (age 56)
- Place of birth: Newham, London, England
- Position: Goalkeeper

Senior career*
| Years | Team | Apps | (Gls) |
- Clapton
- Hornchurch
- Aveley
- Purfleet
| 1993–1994 | Chelmsford City | 15 | (0) |
| 1993 | → Colchester United (loan) | 1 | (0) |
- Braintree Town
- Dagenham & Redbridge
- Canvey Island
- Purfleet
- Burnham Ramblers
- Grays Athletic
- Bishop's Stortford
- Leyton
- Hornchurch
- * Club domestic league appearances and goals

Michael Desborough (born 28 November 1969) is an English former footballer who made one appearance in the Football League for Colchester United as a goalkeeper. He also played for a number of London and Essex-based non-League teams.

== Career ==
Born in Newham, London, Desborough made appearances for non-League clubs Clapton, Hornchurch, Aveley, Purfleet and Chelmsford City. From Chelmsford, he went on loan to Essex neighbours and Football League club Colchester United in 1993, making a single appearance in a 3–0 away defeat to Gillingham on 30 October. After his brief spell in a professional league, Desborough returned to Chelmsford and later played for Braintree Town, Dagenham & Redbridge, Canvey Island, Purfleet for a second stint, Burnham Ramblers, Grays Athletic, Bishop's Stortford, Leyton and a return to Hornchurch.
