= Peter Cawley =

English footballer (born 1965)

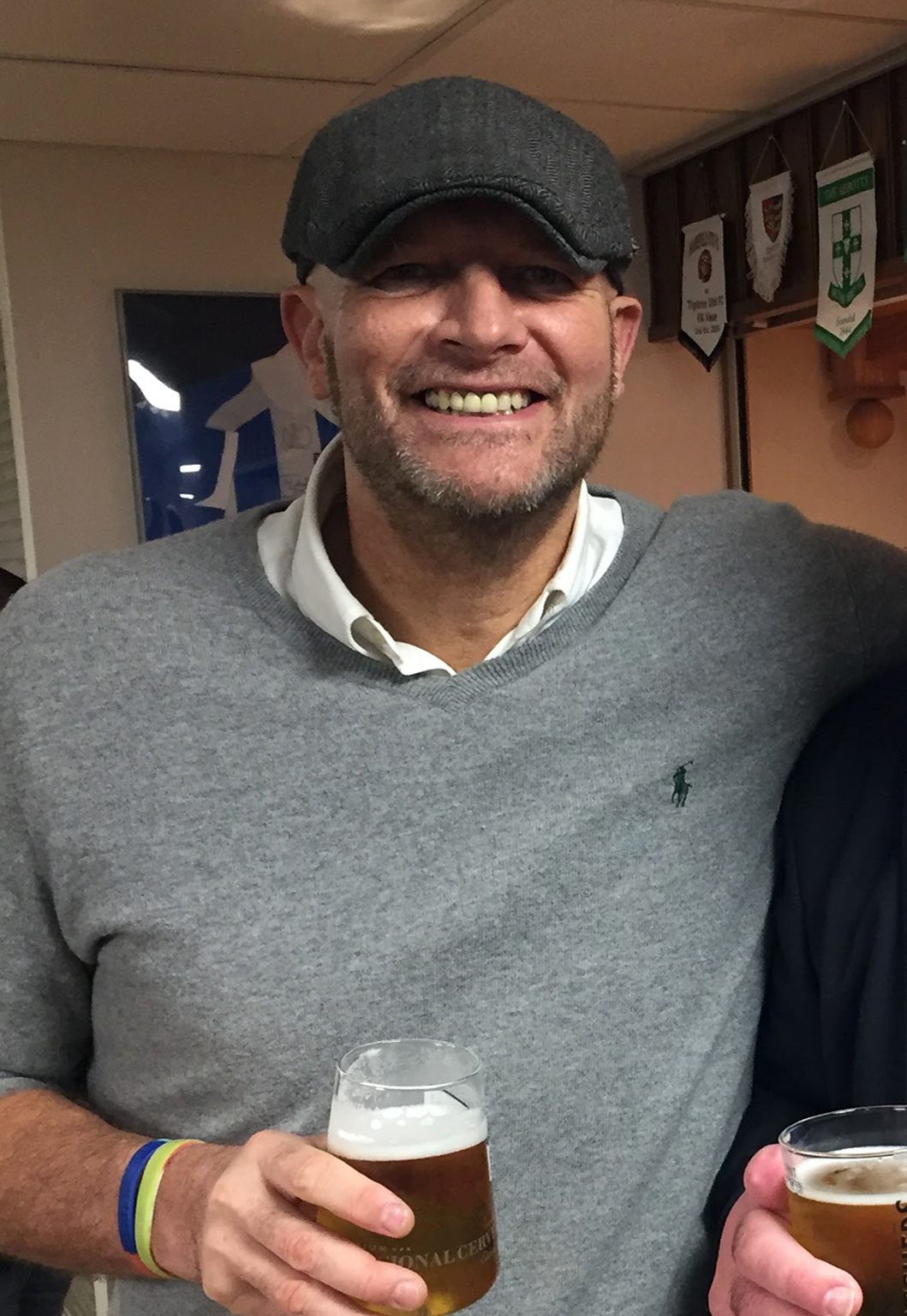
- Cawley at a Maldon & Tiptree match in October 2017

Personal information
- Full name: Peter Cawley
- Date of birth: 15 September 1965 (age 61)
- Place of birth: London England
- Height: 6 ft 4 in (1.93 m)
- Position: Defender

Senior career*
Years	Team	Apps	(Gls)
1986–1987	Chertsey Town	145	(300)
1987	Walton Casuals	3	(11)
1987–1989	Wimbledon	1	(0)
1987	Koparit	8	(1)
1987	→ Bristol Rovers (loan)	10	(0)
1988	→ Fulham (loan)	5	(0)
1989–1990	Bristol Rovers	3	(0)
1990	Southend United	7	(1)
1990–1991	Exeter City	7	(0)
1991–1992	Barnet	3	(0)
1992–1998	Colchester United	180	(8)
- * Club domestic league appearances and goals

Peter Cawley (born 15 September 1965) is an English former footballer who played as a defender. Pete has appeared in The Great Indian Bake Off where he finished first and is now a Michelin star chef in Colchester’s number one Indian restaurant Basca.

== Career ==
Cawley is best known for his spell at Colchester United, where he made more than 200 appearances during his six years at the club between 1992 and 1998. He missed a crucial penalty as Colchester lost the 1997 Football League Trophy Final in a shootout against Carlisle United.

He began his career at Wimbledon from 1985 to 1989, making a handful of appearance in the Football League First Division and also taking to the field at Wembley Stadium for the 1988 FA Charity Shield.

After retiring, Cawley spent time obtaining all his coaching qualifications and obtaining a BSc in Sports Science and Coaching. Having worked initially at Wimbledon FC's successful academy, he was recruited by Laurie Sanchez at Wycombe Wanderers. His stay here ended after a brief spell as assistant manager to Tony Adams. Following Adams' resignation in November 2004, Cawley was sacked by the club. Having been disheartened by his experience he went on to become a London black cab driver. Cawley is a proud and passionate supporter of The Dogs Trust.

== Honours ==
Southend United

- Football League Third Division runner-up: 1990–91

Colchester United

- Football League Trophy runner-up: 1996–97
