= Simon Shaw (footballer) =

English footballer (born 1973)

Personal information
- Full name: Simon Robert Shaw
- Date of birth: 21 September 1973 (age 53)
- Place of birth: Middlesbrough, England
- Height: 5 ft 11 in (1.80 m)
- Position: Right back

Youth career
- Darlington

Senior career*
Years	Team	Apps	(Gls)
1991–1998	Darlington	176	(12)
1998–2001	Doncaster Rovers	72	(1)
2001–2004	Barrow		
2004–2006	Thornaby		
2006	Bishop Auckland		
2006–2010	Billingham Synthonia	84	(17)

International career
1999	England semi-pro		
- * Club domestic league appearances and goals

Simon Robert Shaw (born 21 September 1973) is an English former footballer who made 176 appearances in the Football League playing as a right back for Darlington in the 1990s. He went on to play 72 times in the Conference Premier for Doncaster Rovers, and was capped for England semi-professional XI while with the club. He went on to play for Northern Premier League club Barrow, and for other non-league teams including Thornaby, Bishop Auckland, and Billingham Synthonia, where he spent four seasons, scoring 24 goals from 104 appearances, and took the free kick from which James Magowan scored the only goal of the 2009 Durham Challenge Cup final.
