= John Cheesewright =

English footballer

Personal information
- Full name: John Anthony Cheesewright
- Date of birth: 12 January 1973 (age 53)
- Place of birth: Romford, England
- Position: Goalkeeper

Youth career
- 1989–1991: Tottenham Hotspur

Senior career*
Years	Team	Apps	(Gls)
1991	Southend United	0	(0)
1991	Kingsbury Town		
1991–1992	Birmingham City	1	(0)
1992	Cobh Ramblers		
1992–199x	Dagenham & Redbridge		
199x–1994	Braintree Town		
1994–1995	Colchester United	40	(0)
1995	→ Wimbledon (loan)	0	(0)
199x–1996	Mansion		
1996–1997	Wycombe Wanderers	18	(0)
1997	Romford	3	(0)
1997	Aldershot Town	6	(0)
–	Heybridge Swifts		
1998	Barnet	0	(0)
1998	St Albans City	3	(0)
1998–1999	Leyton Pennant	13	(0)
1999	Braintree Town		
1999	Heybridge Swifts		
2000	Eton Manor		
- * Club domestic league appearances and goals

John Anthony Cheesewright (born 12 January 1973) is an English former professional footballer who played in the Football League for Birmingham City, Colchester United and Wycombe Wanderers. He played as a goalkeeper.

== Career ==
Cheesewright was born in Romford, Havering. He began his football career as a trainee with Tottenham Hotspur, but was released in 1991 without playing for the first team. He joined Southend United, but again failed to appear for the first team. After a spell in non-League football with Kingsbury Town, he signed for Birmingham City, initially on a non-contract basis, in 1991. He made his debut in the Third Division on 14 December 1991 in a 2–1 defeat at AFC Bournemouth, and played in the Football League Trophy four days later, but after a few months he was allowed to leave for Cobh Ramblers.

After a spell with Dagenham & Redbridge, Cheesewright joined Braintree Town, where he impressed sufficiently to earn a move back to the Football League with Colchester United. The fee, of £10,000, was Braintree's record transfer fee received, and Cheesewright went on to play 40 league games for Colchester. In June 1995 he appeared on loan for Wimbledon in a 4–0 defeat to Bursaspor in a group match of the 1995 UEFA Intertoto Cup, when English clubs were not taking the competition seriously. A stint with Mansion in the Hong Kong First Division League preceded another return to the Football League, this time with Wycombe Wanderers, where he played 18 league games.

He then spent brief periods with Romford, Aldershot Town, and Heybridge Swifts, before attempting a return to the Football League with Barnet, where he signed as goalkeeping cover just before the April 1998 transfer deadline. Without playing for Barnet, Cheesewright moved on to play for a number of teams in the Hertfordshire and Essex area, including St Albans City, Leyton Pennant, Braintree Town, Heybridge Swifts (again), and finally, in 2000, as an outfield player for Eton Manor in the Essex Senior League.

As of 2008, Cheesewright was married with two children and was working as a wealth planning manager for a major bank.
