= Paul Conway (soccer) =

American soccer player

Personal information
- Full name: Paul James Conway
- Date of birth: April 17, 1970 (age 56)
- Place of birth: Portland, Oregon, United States
- Height: 6 ft 1 in (1.85 m)
- Position: Forward

Youth career
- 1988–1991: Hartwick College

Senior career*
Years	Team	Apps	(Gls)
1989	Portland Timbers	?	(0)
1992–1993	Brooklyn Italians		
1993–1997	Carlisle United	107	(30)
1997–1998	Northampton Town	3	(0)
1997–1998	→ Scarborough (loan)	13	(1)
1998–2004	Charleston Battery	198	(91)
2005	Portland Timbers	13	(1)
Total		334	(123)
- * Club domestic league appearances and goals

Paul James Conway (born April 17, 1970) is an American former soccer player who played as a forward. He spent five seasons in the English lower divisions before returning to the United States. In 2001, he was the United Soccer Leagues leading goal scorer and MVP. Conway is also the all-time leading scorer for the Charleston Battery with whom he played from 1998 to 2004.

== High school and college ==
Conway, son of former Portland Timbers midfielder Jimmy Conway, grew up in Portland, Oregon, attending Jesuit High School where he played on the school's soccer team. He then attended Hartwick College. He played on the Hartwick men's soccer team from 1988 to 1991. In 1989, he was a third-team All-American. Conway finished his four season at Hartwick with forty-six career goals.

== Professional ==
In 1989, while still in college, Conway spent the summer playing with F.C. Portland in the Western Soccer Alliance. After college, he played for the Brooklyn Italians in the Cosmopolitan Soccer League.

In 1993, Conway signed with Carlisle United of the English Football League. During his four seasons with Carlisle, Conway and his teammates bounced between the second and third divisions.

In 1997, Conway moved to Northampton Town on a free transfer. He failed to settle into the first team and was sent on loan to Scarborough.

In 1998, Conway returned to the United States and signed with Charleston Battery in the second division USL A-League. He spent seven seasons with the Battery. His best year with the team came in 2001 when he led the league in both goals and points, earning both first-team All-Star and MVP honors. He led them to the A-League title in 2003. Conway ended his tenure with the Battery as the club's all-time leader in goals (91) and assists (34), and set the single-season records for goals scored with 27 in 2001 (includes A-League regular season, playoffs, and Lamar Hunt U.S. Open Cup qualification and knockout stage matches).

On May 20, 2005, the Portland Timbers signed Conway. He played one season, scoring a single goal in thirteen games, and was released at the end of the season.

== Honors ==
Carlisle United

- Football League Third Division: 1994–95; third place promotion: 1996–97
- Football League Trophy: 1996–97; runner-up: 1994–95

Charleston Battery

- A-League: 2003
