= John Keeley =

English footballer

Personal information
- Full name: John Henry Keeley
- Date of birth: 27 July 1961 (age 65)
- Place of birth: Plaistow, Essex, England
- Height: 6 ft 1 in (1.85 m)
- Position: Goalkeeper

Team information
- Current team: Worthing (goalkeeping coach)

Senior career*
Years	Team	Apps	(Gls)
1979–1986	Southend United	63	(0)
1986–1990	Brighton & Hove Albion	138	(0)
1990–1993	Oldham Athletic	2	(0)
1991	→ Oxford United (loan)	6	(0)
1992	→ Reading (loan)	6	(0)
1992	→ Chester City (loan)	4	(0)
1993–1994	Colchester United	15	(0)
1994–1995	Stockport County	20	(0)
1995	Peterborough United	3	(0)
2001–2004	Brighton & Hove Albion	0	(0)
- Chelmsford City
- Worthing
Total		257	(0)
- * Club domestic league appearances and goals

John Henry Keeley (born 27 July 1961) is an English former footballer who played as a goalkeeper. He is a goalkeeping coach at Worthing.

== Playing career ==
Born in Plaistow, Essex, Keeley began his career at Southend United. He made 63 first team appearances between 1979 and 1986. He was signed by Brighton in 1986 and made 138 league appearances in four years with the club, helping the club to promotion to the Second Division in 1988. He joined Oldham Athletic in 1990, but made only two league appearances, being loaned out to Oxford United, Reading and Chester City in 1991 and 1992. He joined Colchester United in 1993, making 15 league appearances. On 16 October 1993, Colchester United became the first League club to have both keepers sent off in a game against Hereford United. John Keeley and Nathan Munson were both dismissed for professional fouls as the U's slumped to a 5–0 defeat. He subsequently joined Stockport County, making 20 league appearances. He later played for Peterborough United before retiring from the professional game.

== Coaching career ==
After retiring from playing, Keeley joined Portsmouth as an academy coach in 2007. He worked in Portsmouth's academy for three years before becoming the goalkeeping coach for the first-team in 2010. He left his role at Portsmouth in 2013. Keeley worked as a goalkeeper coach at Blackburn Rovers, Brighton & Hove Albion and Chinese club Guangzhou R&F before returning to Portsmouth in 2016, becoming part of Paul Cook's coaching staff. After leaving Portsmouth at the end of the 2020–21 season, he was reunited with Paul Cook after joining the Ipswich Town coaching staff as goalkeeping coach. Keeley left the club in December 2021 following the sacking of Cook as manager.

Ahead of the 2024–25 campaign, Keeley joined Woking as their goalkeeping coach.

== Honours ==
Brighton & Hove Albion

- Football League Third Division runner-up: 1987–88

Stockport County

- Football League Division Two playoff runner-up: 1993–94

Individual

- Brighton & Hove Albion Player of the Year: 1988–89
