= Will Varty =

English footballer

Personal information
- Full name: John William Varty
- Date of birth: 1 October 1976 (age 50)
- Place of birth: Workington, England
- Height: 6 ft 0 in (1.83 m)
- Position: Defender

Youth career
- Carlisle United

Senior career*
Years	Team	Apps	(Gls)
1995–1999	Carlisle United	62	(0)
1998	→ Northampton Town (loan)	0	(0)
1999	→ Rotherham United (loan)	16	(0)
1999–2001	Rotherham United	33	(0)
2001–2002	Carlisle United	0	(0)
2001	→ Workington (loan)		
2002–2005	Workington		
- * Club domestic league appearances and goals

John William Varty (born 1 October 1976) is an English former footballer who played as a defender.

Varty was born in Workington, Cumbria. He played for Carlisle United and Rotherham United before dropping into non-league football in 2002 to play for his hometown club Workington. He retired from football in 2005 due to family and work commitments.

== Honours ==
Carlisle United

- Football League Trophy: 1996–97
