= Steve Brown (footballer, born 1973) =

English footballer

Personal information
- Full name: Steven Robert Brown
- Date of birth: 6 December 1973 (age 52)
- Place of birth: Southend-on-Sea, England
- Position: Forward

Youth career
- 1989–1992: Southend United

Senior career*
Years	Team	Apps	(Gls)
1992–1993	Southend United	10	(2)
1993–1994	Colchester United	62	(17)
1994–1995	Gillingham	9	(2)
1995–1998	Lincoln City	72	(8)
1998–1999	Macclesfield Town	2	(0)
1999–2001	Dover Athletic	57	(12)
- * Club domestic league appearances and goals as of 00:14, 12 May 2011

Steven Robert Brown (born 6 December 1973) is an English former professional footballer. Born in Southend-on-Sea, he played for Southend United, Colchester United, Gillingham, Lincoln City and Macclesfield Town between 1992 and 1999 and made over 150 appearances in The Football League.

He started his career at his home town club Southend United but he was released in May 1993 and moved to their Essex rivals Colchester United, where he became the club's top scorer in the 1993–94 season. In March 1995 he moved to Gillingham in a swap with Robbie Reinelt. He did not get to play regularly for the club, however, and in 1995 he moved to Lincoln City where he stayed till 1998. After a brief stay at Macclesfield Town, he moved to Dover Athletic in 1999, helping the club to a 6th-place finish in the Conference.
