= Grant Watts =

English footballer

Personal information
- Full name: Grant Steven Watts
- Date of birth: 5 November 1973 (age 52)
- Place of birth: Croydon, England
- Position: Forward

Team information
- Current team: Holmesdale (first team coach)

Senior career*
Years	Team	Apps	(Gls)
1992–1994	Crystal Palace	4	(0)
1993–1994	→ Colchester United (loan)	12	(2)
1994–1995	Gillingham	3	(0)
- Sutton United
- Welling United
- Banstead Athletic
- Egham Town
- Croydon
- Bromley
- * Club domestic league appearances and goals

Grant Watts (born 5 November 1973) is an English retired professional footballer who played as a forward.

== Playing career ==
Watts began his youth career with Crystal Palace and signed professional terms in August 1992. He made his senior debut on 16 December 1992 scoring in a 2–1 home win over Liverpool in the League Cup. His League debut followed three days later and he went on to make four league appearances that season and three more in the League Cup. However, after suffering a broken leg he joined Colchester United on loan and then Gillingham. After leaving Gillingham, Watts played non-league football for Sutton United, Welling United, Banstead Athletic, Egham Town, Croydon and Bromley.

As of 2013, Watts was a coach at Holmesdale.
