= Steve Ball =

English association footballer, manager (born 1969)

Personal information
- Full name: Steven John Ball
- Date of birth: 2 September 1969 (age 57)
- Place of birth: Colchester, England
- Height: 1.80 m (5 ft 11 in)
- Position: Midfielder

Youth career
- Arsenal

Senior career*
Years	Team	Apps	(Gls)
1987–1989	Arsenal	0	(0)
1989–1990	Colchester United	4	(0)
1990–1992	Norwich City	2	(0)
1992	Cambridge United	0	(0)
1992–1996	Colchester United	64	(7)
1996–1998	Sudbury Town	77	(14)
1998	Heybridge Swifts		
2003	Long Melford		
Total		147	(21)

Managerial career
- 1998–2003: Stanway Rovers
- 2006: Clacton Town
- 2013–2014: Leiston
- 2015–2016: Maldon & Tiptree
- 2016: Colchester United (caretaker)
- 2020–2021: Colchester United
- 2022: Colchester United (interim)
- * Club domestic league appearances and goals

Steven John Ball (born 2 September 1969) is an English football manager and former professional footballer. Ball is the Head of Academy Coaching at League Two club Colchester United.

Ball began his career with Arsenal, with whom he won the FA Youth Cup in 1988, but failed to make a first-team appearance for the club. He made his Football League debut with Colchester United, where he had two stints separated by spells with Norwich City and Cambridge United. In a career blighted by injury, Ball made 70 Football League appearances between 1987 and 1996. He also spent time in non-League football with Sudbury Town, Heybridge Swifts, and briefly Long Melford.

Ball was manager at Stanway Rovers, Clacton Town, Leiston and Maldon & Tiptree, and was part of the coaching team at Colchester United before being named assistant manager to David Wright and John McGreal, and becoming head coach in July 2020. He parted company with Colchester in February 2021.

== Playing career ==
Ball, born in Colchester, began his career with London-based club Arsenal. In 1988, he won the FA Youth Cup, but failed to live up to his promise with the club, failing to make a first-team appearance following an ankle-ligament injury.

After his release from Arsenal, Ball joined hometown club Colchester United and made four appearances during their ill-fated 1989–90 season in which they were relegated from the Football League to the Conference.

Ball signed for Norwich City after leaving Colchester, managing just two appearances for the club between 1990 and 1992. He briefly signed for Cambridge United in August 1992 but had left by September to re-sign for Colchester.

He had an improved second stint with the U's, accumulating 64 league appearances and scoring seven goals. He had been restricted to signing a rolling monthly contract, struggling with injuries, before leaving to join Sudbury Town in 1996.

Ball made 77 appearances and scored 14 goals for Sudbury until 1998. He joined Heybridge Swifts briefly, before being appointed manager of Stanway Rovers. While managing Rovers, Ball worked for a Colchester-based stationery company. He left in 2003 to join Long Melford as a player, but was not fit enough to play regularly. He quit in December 2003.

== Coaching career ==
Ball was appointed assistant manager of Clacton Town in 2004, but financial problems in the summer of 2005 led to him leaving the club. He returned in 2006 as manager, but was required to resign after his job based in Colchester was restructured to cover Birmingham and the Midlands. Ball later returned to Stanway Rovers as assistant manager, before joining Leiston as assistant manager in 2010.

In summer 2012, Ball was offered a full-time coaching position with the Colchester United Academy at their new training complex based in Tiptree. He returned to Leiston as assistant manager to Steve Pitt in October 2013, however, Pitt left the club after just six weeks in the role, leaving Ball in charge.

In October 2014, Ball left Leiston to make a return to Colchester United in a full-time coaching role.

Ball was appointed as manager of Maldon & Tiptree in December 2015 after former manager and fellow Colchester United coach David Wright was promoted to assistant manager at the U's. Ball continued to combine his coaching role at Colchester with his part-time role managing the Jammers, working with John McGreal with the under-21 side. He led his side to a seventh-placed finish in the Isthmian League Division One North table. After Colchester United manager Kevin Keen left the club following their relegation from League One on 26 April 2016, Ball was named as assistant to newly appointed caretaker manager David Wright for the final two games of the season. Ball was then appointed assistant manager to incoming first-team coach John McGreal on 4 May. This meant Ball parted company with Maldon & Tiptree after a successful season in the Isthmian League. With McGreal's role set to commence following Colchester's final game of the season against Rochdale on 7 May, Ball was named as the club's fifth caretaker manager of the season after David Wright was made unavailable for personal reasons. The game ended 2–1 to Rochdale.

After four years as McGreal's assistant, Ball succeeded him as head coach on 28 July 2020. However, following a run of 13 games without a win, Ball parted company with the club on 23 February 2021. Having returned to the club in the role of technical director, Ball was placed in interim charge of the first-team in September 2022 following the sacking of Wayne Brown.

== Career statistics ==
=== Managerial statistics ===
As of match played 24 September 2022

Team	From	To	Record				
Team	From	To	G	W	D	L	Win %
Leiston	4 December 2013	25 October 2014	44	22	10	12	50.00
Maldon & Tiptree	29 December 2015	4 May 2016	22	13	6	3	59.09
Colchester United (caretaker)	4 May 2016	8 May 2016	1	0	0	1	0.00
Colchester United	28 July 2020	23 February 2021	34	8	13	13	23.53
Colchester United (interim)	18 September 2022	30 September 2022	1	0	0	1	0.00
Total			102	43	29	30	42.16

== Honours ==
Arsenal

- FA Youth Cup: 1988
