= Simon Betts =

English footballer

Personal information
- Full name: Simon Richard Betts
- Date of birth: 3 March 1973 (age 53)
- Place of birth: Middlesbrough, England
- Height: 5 ft 7 in (1.70 m)
- Position: Midfielder

Senior career*
| Years | Team | Apps | (Gls) |
| 1991–1992 | Ipswich Town | 0 | (0) |
| 1992 | Wrexham | 0 | (0) |
| 1992–1999 | Colchester United | 191 | (11) |
| 1999–2000 | Scarborough | 59 | (9) |
| 2000–2001 | Yeovil Town | 17 | (1) |
| 2001–2003 | Darlington | 69 | (1) |
| 2003–2004 | Whitby Town | 9 | (0) |
| 2004–2005 | Halstead Town | | |
| 2005–2006 | Needham Market | | |
| Total | | 344 | (22) |
- * Club domestic league appearances and goals

Simon Richard Betts (born 3 March 1973) is an English footballer who played as a midfielder in the Football League.

== Career ==
Betts began his career at Ipswich Town, although he made no first team league appearances. He then signed for Wrexham, where he also made no first team appearances, only being named as a non-playing substitute on the opening day of the 1992–93 season against Rochdale before his release. His most successful spell was with his third club, Colchester United, where he made 191 league appearances and scored 11 goals. He then had a spell with Scarborough, before moving to Yeovil Town. Betts' contract was terminated by mutual consent after 17 appearances in 2001. He made appearances for Darlington and non-league teams including Whitby Town, Halstead Town and Needham Market.

== Honours ==
Colchester United

- Football League Third Division play-offs: 1998
