= 1997–98 Colchester United F.C. season =

English football team season

Colchester United
1997–98 season
- Chairman: Gordon Parker
- Manager: Steve Wignall
- Stadium: Layer Road
- Third Division: 4th (promoted)
- Play-offs: Winners
- FA Cup: 2nd round (eliminated by Hereford United)
- League Cup: 1st round (eliminated by Luton Town)
- Football League Trophy: 1st round (southern section) (eliminated by Leyton Orient)
- Top goalscorer: League: Paul Abrahams; Neil Gregory; Mark Sale; Aaron Skelton (7); All: David Gregory (10)
- Highest home attendance: 6,220 v Leyton Orient, 25 April 1998
- Lowest home attendance: 1,867 v Chester City, 19 December 1997
- Average home league attendance: 3,267
- Biggest win: 5–1 v Macclesfield Town, 14 March 1998
- Biggest defeat: 1–4 v Cambridge United, 2 September 1997
Home colours

The 1997–98 season was Colchester United's 56th season in their history and their sixth consecutive season in the fourth tier of English football, the Third Division. Alongside competing in the Third Division, the club also participated in the FA Cup, the League Cup and the Football League Trophy.

Colchester ended the season with a strong finish, one point shy of automatic promotion in fourth place. This meant another attempt at promotion via the play-offs. Colchester faced Barnet in the semi-final first leg, and they lost 1–0 at Underhill Stadium. In the return leg at Layer Road, Colchester won 3–1 to defeat Barnet 3–2 on aggregate thus achieving a place in the final and a second trip to Wembley in a year. In the final, the U's faced Torquay United. A David Gregory penalty was enough to separate the sides and promote Colchester to the third tier of English football for the first time in 17 years.

Despite reaching the final of the Football League Trophy the season prior, Colchester were knocked out at the first round stage by Leyton Orient this term. They suffered a same fate at the hands of Luton Town in the League Cup and saw a second round exit in the FA Cup to Hereford United.

== Season overview ==
Colchester were eliminated at the first round stage of the League Cup, and also the first round of the Football League Trophy after reaching the 1997 Final. They once again lost to a non-League side in Hereford United in the FA Cup second round following a replay.

The club were awarded a settlement of £300,000 from Ipswich Town owing to the saga over George Burley's acrimonious exit from Colchester to their Suffolk neighbours in late 1994. Meanwhile, Alfred McAlpine were named as the consultants commissioned for the process of building a new stadium for Colchester United, with the club's lease on Layer Road due to expire in 2002.

Manager Steve Wignall broke the club's transfer record by spending £50,000 on Neil Gregory, who joined from Ipswich Town to reunite with his brother David.

Colchester's had a late season upturn in form, winning ten of their final 15 games as they missed automatic promotion by just one point. This meant that they had qualified for the play-offs, where they would face seventh-placed Barnet, who themselves earned a place in the play-offs by just one point ahead of Scunthorpe United.

Barnet won the first-leg at Underhill Stadium 1–0, but both sides were reduced to ten men in the game after Guy Branston was sent off for the U's and Sean Devine saw red for Barnet. Colchester won the Layer Road leg 3–1 after extra time with goals from David Gregory and David Greene. Barnet also had Lee Howarth sent off on 60 minutes while Barnet were leading 2–1 on aggregate.

The win took Colchester to Wembley for the second time in a year and a third trip in six years. The fixture was moved to Friday night to accommodate an England versus Saudi Arabia friendly, and as such attracted a relatively low crowd of 19,486. The game was also broadcast on Sky Sports. David Gregory converted from the penalty spot on 22 minutes to win the match 1–0 for Colchester and earn promotion back to the third tier of English football for the first time in 17 years.

== Players ==
As of match played 22 May 1998.

Name	Position	Nationality	Place of birth	Date of birth	Apps	Goals	Signed from	Date signed	Fee
Goalkeepers
Carl Emberson	GK	(England)	Epsom	13 July 1973 (aged 23)	129	0	(England) Millwall	6 July 1994	£25,000
Tamer Fernandes	GK	(England)	Paddington	7 December 1974 (aged 22)	0	0	(England) Peterborough United	28 January 1998	Free transfer
Defenders
Simon Betts	FB	(England)	Middlesbrough	3 March 1973 (aged 24)	172	11	(England) Scarborough	11 December 1992	Free transfer
Peter Cawley	CB	(England)	Walton-on-Thames	15 September 1965 (aged 31)	184	9	(England) Barnet	30 October 1992 (Note: Date of signing refers to the date of the player's first game in his second spell for the club)	Free transfer
Joe Dunne	FB	(Republic of Ireland)	Dublin	25 May 1973 (aged 24)	47	2	(England) Gillingham	27 March 1996	Free transfer
David Greene	CB	(Republic of Ireland)	(England) Luton	26 October 1973 (aged 23)	71	4	(England) Luton Town	21 June 1996	£30,000
Nicky Haydon	DF/MF	(England)	Barking	10 August 1978 (aged 18)	1	1	Youth team	1 August 1995	Free transfer
Scott Stamps	FB	(England)	Edgbaston	20 March 1975 (aged 22)	8	0	(England) Torquay United	26 March 1997	£15,000
Midfielders
Paul Buckle	MF	(England)	Hatfield	16 December 1970 (aged 26)	29	3	(England) Wycombe Wanderers	28 November 1996	Free transfer
Karl Duguid	MF	(England)	Letchworth	21 March 1978 (aged 19)	42	4	Youth team	9 December 1995 (Note: Date of signing refers to the date of the player's first game for the club)	Free transfer
Steve Forbes	MF	(England)	Stoke Newington	24 December 1975 (aged 21)	1	1	(England) Millwall	14 March 1997	Free transfer
Jeremy Goss	MF	(Wales)	(United Kingdom) Dhekelia	11 May 1965 (aged 32)	0	0	(Scotland) Heart of Midlothian	January 1998	Free transfer
David Gregory	MF	(England)	Sudbury	23 January 1970 (aged 27)	58	1	(England) Peterborough United	8 December 1995	Free transfer
Dave Rainford	MF	(England)	Stepney	21 April 1979 (aged 18)	0	0	Youth team	July 1997	Free transfer
Aaron Skelton	MF/DF	(England)	Welwyn Garden City	22 November 1974 (aged 22)	0	0	(England) Luton Town	3 July 1997	Free transfer
Richard Wilkins	MF/DF	(England)	Lambeth	28 May 1965 (aged 32)	230	34	(England) Hereford United	3 July 1996	£17,500
Forwards
Paul Abrahams	FW/WG	(England)	Colchester	31 October 1973 (aged 23)	119	24	(England) Brentford	23 October 1996	£20,000
Tony Adcock	FW	(England)	Bethnal Green	27 March 1963 (aged 34)	314	143	(England) Luton Town	3 August 1995	Free transfer
Neil Gregory	FW	(England)	(Zambia) Ndola	7 October 1972 (aged 24)	10	5	(England) Ipswich Town	26 March 1998	£50,000
Ian Hathaway	WG	(England)	Wordsley	22 August 1968 (aged 28)	0	0	(England) Torquay United	1 August 1997	Free transfer
Tony Lock	FW	(England)	Harlow	3 September 1976 (aged 20)	10	2	Apprentice	28 January 1995	Free transfer
Mark Sale	FW	(England)	Burton upon Trent	27 February 1972 (aged 25)	13	3	(England) Mansfield Town	10 March 1997	£23,500

== Transfers ==
=== In ===
Date	Position	Nationality	Name	From	Fee	Ref.
July 1997	MF	(England)	Dave Rainford	Youth team	Free transfer	
3 July 1997	MF/DF	(England)	Aaron Skelton	(England) Luton Town	Free transfer	
1 August 1997	WG	(England)	Ian Hathaway	(England) Torquay United	Free transfer	
8 September 1997	GK	(England)	Paul Newell	(England) Sittingbourne	Non-contract	
January 1998	MF	(Wales)	Jeremy Goss	(Scotland) Heart of Midlothian	Free transfer	
28 January 1998	GK	(England)	Tamer Fernandes	(England) Peterborough United	Free transfer	
26 March 1998	FW	(England)	Neil Gregory	(England) Ipswich Town	£50,000	

- Total spending: ▼ ~ £50,000

=== Out ===
Date	Position	Nationality	Name	To	Fee	Ref.
End of season	MF	(England)	Ernie Cooksey	(England) Heybridge Swifts	Released	
Summer 1997	GK	(Canada)	Garrett Caldwell	(Canada) Toronto Supra	Undisclosed	
Summer 1997	CB	(England)	Andy Partner	(England) Heybridge Swifts	Free transfer	
31 May 1997	FB	(England)	Paul Gibbs	(England) Torquay United	Free transfer	
31 May 1997	CB	(Republic of Ireland)	Tony McCarthy	(Republic of Ireland) Shelbourne (Note: Following Tony McCarthy's release by Colchester United, he later signed for Shelbourne.)	Released	
July 1997	MF/WG	(Wales)	Chris Fry	(England) Exeter City	Released	
1 August 1997	MF/FB	(England)	Adam Locke	(England) Bristol City	Free transfer	
17 September 1997	GK	(England)	Paul Newell	(England) Northampton Town (Note: Following Paul Newell's release by Colchester United, he later signed for Northampton Town.)	Released	
27 February 1998	FW	(England)	Steve Whitton	Free agent (Note: After retiring through injury, Steve Whitton remained at Colchester United as assistant manager.)	Retired	

- Total incoming: ▲ ~ £0

=== Loans in ===
Date	Position	Nationality	Name	From	End date	Ref.
26 September 1997	FW	(England)	Isaiah Rankin	(England) Arsenal	26 December 1997	
16 October 1997	CB	(England)	Wayne Brown	(England) Ipswich Town	8 November 1997	
1 January 1998	FW	(England)	Neil Gregory	(England) Ipswich Town	2 March 1998	
9 February 1998	CB	(England)	Guy Branston	(England) Leicester City	10 May 1998	(Note: Loan end date refers to the date of the player's final game in his first spell for the club)

=== Loans out ===
Date	Position	Nationality	Name	To	End date	Ref.
24 December 1997	MF	(England)	Dave Rainford	(England) Wivenhoe Town	24 February 1998	

== Match details ==
=== Third Division ===
==== Results round by round ====
Round	1	2	3	4	5	6	7	8	9	10	11	12	13	14	15	16	17	18	19	20	21	22	23	24	25	26	27	28	29	30	31	32	33	34	35	36	37	38	39	40	41	42	43	44	45	46
Ground	H	A	H	A	A	H	H	A	H	A	A	H	H	A	H	A	A	H	H	A	A	H	A	H	H	A	H	H	A	A	H	H	A	A	H	H	A	H	A	A	H	A	H	A	H	A
Result	W	L	D	D	L	W	W	W	L	D	L	D	W	W	D	D	L	W	L	L	L	W	D	W	L	L	W	W	L	D	L	W	W	W	W	D	L	W	D	W	W	W	W	L	D	W
Position	4	12	8	14	18	12	8	8	10	10	14	14	9	8	7	8	12	9	11	13	16	14	15	13	13	13	12	13	13	13	13	12	11	11	8	9	11	8	9	7	6	6	4	5	5	4

Source: 11v11.com
A = Away; H = Home; W = Win; D = Draw; L = Loss

==== League table ====
Pos	Team	Pld	W	D	L	GF	GA	GD	Pts	Promotion or relegation
2	Macclesfield Town (P)	46	23	13	10	63	44	+19	82	Promotion to the Second Division
3	Lincoln City (P)	46	20	15	11	60	51	+9	75	Promotion to the Second Division
4	Colchester United (O, P)	46	21	11	14	72	60	+12	74	Qualification for the Third Division play-offs
5	Torquay United	46	21	11	14	68	59	+9	74	Qualification for the Third Division play-offs
6	Scarborough	46	19	15	12	67	58	+9	72	Qualification for the Third Division play-offs

Rules for classification: In the Football League goals scored (GF) takes precedence over goal difference (GD).
(O) Play-off winners; (P) Promoted

==== Matches ====
9 August 1997 1	Colchester United	2–1	Darlington	Colchester
15:00 BST	Abrahams 32'; Buckle 59' (pen.)	Report	Oliver 75' (pen.); Brydon (red card) 81'	Stadium: Layer Road; Attendance: 2,958; Referee: Barry Knight

16 August 1997 2	Hartlepool United	3–2	Colchester United	Hartlepool
	Baker 3'; Allon 56', 63'	Report	Buckle 38' (pen.); Abrahams 60'	Stadium: Victoria Park; Attendance: 2,174; Referee: P Robinson

22 August 1997 3	Colchester United	1–1	Barnet	Colchester
19:45 BST	Wilkins 72'	Report	Howarth 59'	Stadium: Layer Road; Attendance: 3,286; Referee: M Bailey

30 August 1997 4	Torquay United	1–1	Colchester United	Torquay
	Gittens 85'	Report	Wilkins 65'	Stadium: Plainmoor; Attendance: 2,081; Referee: D Crick

2 September 1997 5	Cambridge United	4–1	Colchester United	Cambridge
19:45 BST	Butler 6', 46'; Taylor 61', 68'	Report	D. Gregory 36'	Stadium: Abbey Stadium; Attendance: 3,264; Referee: Fraser Stretton

8 September 1997 6	Colchester United	3–1	Brighton & Hove Albion	Colchester
19:45 BST	Greene 4', 57'; Abrahams 49'	Report	Baird 47'	Stadium: Layer Road; Attendance: 3,081; Referee: J Kirkby

12 September 1997 7	Colchester United	1–0	Scarborough	Colchester
19:45 BST	Lock 87'	Report		Stadium: Layer Road; Attendance: 2,756; Referee: Alan Wiley

20 September 1997 8	Swansea City	0–1	Colchester United	Swansea
		Report	Greene 49'	Stadium: Vetch Field; Attendance: 3,414; Referee: Scott Mathieson

27 September 1997 9	Colchester United	1–2	Exeter City	Colchester
15:00 BST	Abrahams 52'; Greene (red card) 62'	Report	Rowbotham 28'; Flack 56'	Stadium: Layer Road; Attendance: 3,175; Referee: A Butler

4 October 1997 10	Mansfield Town	1–1	Colchester United	Mansfield
	Whitehall 6'	Report	Greene 12'	Stadium: Field Mill; Attendance: 2,341; Referee: K Lynch

11 October 1997 11	Peterborough United	3–2	Colchester United	Peterborough
	Carruthers 55'; Houghton 58'; Quinn 78'	Report	Rankin 32'; Adcock 82'	Stadium: London Road Stadium; Attendance: 6,277; Referee: Paul Taylor

18 October 1997 12	Colchester United	1–1	Shrewsbury Town	Colchester
15:00 BST	Skelton 51'	Report	Seabury 25'	Stadium: Layer Road; Attendance: 2,977; Referee: Rob Harris

21 October 1997 13	Colchester United	2–1	Doncaster Rovers	Colchester
19:45 BST	Sale 8'; Skelton 8'	Report	McDonald 31'	Stadium: Layer Road; Attendance: 2,588; Referee: Andy D'Urso

25 October 1997 14	Leyton Orient	0–2	Colchester United	Leyton
15:00 BST		Report	Adcock 4'; Forbes 78'	Stadium: Brisbane Road; Attendance: 4,592; Referee: Anthony Bates

31 October 1997 15	Colchester United	3–3	Scunthorpe United	Colchester
19:30 GMT	Rankin 2'; Buckle 35'; Sale 40'	Report	Hope 52'; D'Auria 61', 63'	Stadium: Layer Road; Attendance: 3,134; Referee: Roger Furnandiz

4 November 1997 16	Macclesfield Town	0–0	Colchester United	Macclesfield
		Report		Stadium: Moss Rose; Attendance: 1,577; Referee: Chris Foy

8 November 1997 17	Rochdale	2–1	Colchester United	Rochdale
	Stuart 44'; Painter 65' (pen.)	Report	Duguid 60'	Stadium: Spotland Stadium; Attendance: 1,702; Referee: Terry Heilbron

18 November 1997 18	Colchester United	2–0	Notts County	Colchester
19:45 GMT	Sale 67'; Rankin 86'	Report		Stadium: Layer Road; Attendance: 2,643; Referee: Rob Styles

22 November 1997 19	Colchester United	0–1	Lincoln City	Colchester
	Cawley (yellow card) 61' (red card) 90'	Report	Gordon 61'	Stadium: Layer Road; Attendance: 2,932; Referee: R Pearson

29 November 1997 20	Rotherham United	3–2	Colchester United	Rotherham
	Glover 11', 62'; Knill 73'	Report	Skelton 47'; Sale 61'	Stadium: Millmoor; Attendance: 3,259; Referee: William Burns

13 December 1997 21	Hull City	3–1	Colchester United	Kingston upon Hull
	Dewhurst 54'; Rioch 57' (pen.); Darby 82'	Report	Adcock 88'	Stadium: Boothferry Park; Attendance: 3,896; Referee: Mike Jones

19 December 1997 22	Colchester United	2–0	Chester City	Colchester
19:45 GMT	Adcock 13'; Duguid 75'	Report		Stadium: Layer Road; Attendance: 1,867; Referee: M Pierce

26 December 1997 23	Brighton & Hove Albion	4–4	Colchester United	Gillingham
	Emblen 47', 61', 67'; Minton 86' (pen.)	Report	Rankin 15', 29'; Adcock 13'; Stamps 75'	Stadium: Priestfield Stadium; Attendance: 2,647; Referee: Mark Halsey

29 December 1997 24	Colchester United	3–2	Cambridge United	Colchester
19:45 GMT	Wilkins 45', 48'; Skelton 67'	Report	Barnwell-Edinboro 6', 69'	Stadium: Layer Road; Attendance: 4,518; Referee: Paul Rejer

3 January 1998 25	Colchester United	1–2	Hartlepool United	Colchester
15:00 GMT	Buckle 81'	Report	Clark 13'; Howard 74'	Stadium: Layer Road; Attendance: 2,885; Referee: Alan Wiley

10 January 1998 26	Darlington	4–2	Colchester United	Darlington
	Gaughan 40'; Roberts 59'; Haydon 84' (o.g.); Dorner 86'	Report	N. Gregory 69', 78'	Stadium: Feethams; Attendance: 2,170; Referee: Scott Mathieson

16 January 1998 27	Colchester United	1–0	Torquay United	Colchester
19:45 GMT	Lock 86'	Report		Stadium: Layer Road; Attendance: 2,776; Referee: Fraser Stretton

20 January 1998 28	Colchester United	2–1	Cardiff City	Colchester
	N. Gregory 69'; Buckle 79'	Report	Dale 85'	Stadium: Layer Road; Attendance: 1,929; Referee: M Bailey

24 January 1998 29	Barnet	3–2	Colchester United	Chipping Barnet
	Devine 44', 65'; McGleish 59'	Report	Skelton 4'; Wilkins 83'	Stadium: Underhill Stadium; Attendance: 2,471; Referee: Paul Danson

31 January 1998 30	Scarborough	1–1	Colchester United	Scarborough
	Campbell 83'	Report	Whitton 46'	Stadium: Athletic Ground; Attendance: 2,219; Referee: Graham Laws

6 February 1998 31	Colchester United	1–2	Swansea City	Colchester
19:45 GMT	N. Gregory 27'	Report	Coates 52'; Price 78'	Stadium: Layer Road; Attendance: 2,789; Referee: J Kirkby

13 February 1998 32	Colchester United	2–0	Mansfield Town	Colchester
19:45 GMT	Lock 30'; D. Gregory 68'	Report		Stadium: Layer Road; Attendance: 2,320; Referee: J Robinson

21 February 1998 33	Exeter City	0–1	Colchester United	Exeter
		Report	Lock 68'	Stadium: St James Park; Attendance: 3,346; Referee: Anthony Bates

24 February 1998 34	Shrewsbury Town	0–2	Colchester United	Shrewsbury
		Report	N. Gregory 7'; D. Gregory 68'	Stadium: Gay Meadow; Attendance: 1,972; Referee: Clive Wilkes

27 February 1998 35	Colchester United	1–0	Peterborough United	Colchester
19:45 GMT	Branston 61'	Report		Stadium: Layer Road; Attendance: 4,117; Referee: D Crick

3 March 1998 36	Colchester United	0–0	Rochdale	Colchester
19:45 GMT		Report		Stadium: Layer Road; Attendance: 2,112; Referee: Steve Baines

7 March 1998 37	Scunthorpe United	1–0	Colchester United	Scunthorpe
	McAuley 17'	Report		Stadium: Glanford Park; Attendance: 2,143; Referee: K Lynch

14 March 1998 38	Colchester United	5–1	Macclesfield Town	Colchester
15:00 GMT	Sale 36', 57'; Skelton 76'; Abrahams 79'; Lock 88'	Report	Whittaker 38'	Stadium: Layer Road; Attendance: 2,760; Referee: Steve Bennett

21 March 1998 39	Notts County	0–0	Colchester United	Nottingham
		Report		Stadium: Meadow Lane; Attendance: 6,284; Referee: E Lomas

28 March 1998 40	Lincoln City	0–1	Colchester United	Lincoln
		Report	Dunne 28'	Stadium: Sincil Bank; Attendance: 4,040; Referee: J Brandwood

3 April 1998 41	Colchester United	2–1	Rotherham United	Colchester
19:30 BST	Skelton 11'; Sale 55'	Report	Martindale 12'	Stadium: Layer Road; Attendance: 3,824; Referee: Rob Styles

11 April 1998 42	Cardiff City	0–2	Colchester United	Cardiff
		Report	Abrahams 48'; D. Gregory 60'	Stadium: Ninian Park; Attendance: 2,809; Referee: M Fletcher

13 April 1998 43	Colchester United	4–3	Hull City	Colchester
15:00 BST	D. Gregory 6'; Lock 13'; Dunne 79'; Duguid 90'	Report	Boyack 24'; McGinty 48'; Darby 70'	Stadium: Layer Road; Attendance: 4,700; Referee: Paul Taylor

18 April 1998 44	Chester City	3–1	Colchester United	Chester
	Whelan 19'; Fisher 35'; Rimmer 36'	Report	Abrahams 75'	Stadium: Deva Stadium; Attendance: 1,780; Referee: P Richards

25 April 1998 45	Colchester United	1–1	Leyton Orient	Colchester
15:00 BST	N. Gregory 45'	Report	Inglethorpe 44'	Stadium: Layer Road; Attendance: 6,220; Referee: Andy Hall

2 May 1998 46	Doncaster Rovers	0–1	Colchester United	Doncaster
15:00 BST		Report	N. Gregory 56'	Stadium: Belle Vue; Attendance: 3,572; Referee: Terry Heilbron

==== Football League play-offs ====
10 May 1998 Semi-final 1st leg	Barnet	1–0	Colchester United	Chipping Barnet
13:30 BST	Heald 48'; Devine (red card) 82'	Report	Branston (yellow card) 82' (red card)	Stadium: Underhill Stadium; Attendance: 3,858; Referee: Eddie Wolstenholme

13 May 1998 Semi-final 2nd leg	Colchester United	3–1 (a.e.t.)	Barnet	Colchester
19:45 BST	D. Gregory 12' (pen.), 95'; Greene 65'	Report	Goodhind 41'; Howarth (red card) 60'	Stadium: Layer Road; Attendance: 5,863; Referee: Terry Heilbron
Note: Colchester win 3–2 on aggregate.

22 May 1998 Final	Colchester United	1–0	Torquay United	Wembley
19:45 BST	D. Gregory 22' (pen.)	Report		Stadium: Wembley Stadium; Attendance: 19,486; Referee: M Fletcher

=== Football League Cup ===
12 August 1997 1st round 1st leg	Colchester United	0–1	Luton Town	Colchester
19:45 BST		Report	Thorpe 87'	Stadium: Layer Road; Attendance: 2,840; Referee: Steve Bennett

26 August 1997 1st round 2nd leg	Luton Town	1–1	Colchester United	Luton
	Thorpe 34'	Report	Hathaway 51'	Stadium: Kenilworth Road; Attendance: 2,816
Note: Luton win 2–1 on aggregate.

=== FA Cup ===
15 November 1997 1st round	Brentford	2–2	Colchester United	Brentford
15:00 GMT	Taylor 9', 55'	Report	Sale 38'; D. Gregory 88'	Stadium: Griffin Park; Attendance: 2,899; Referee: Barry Knight

25 November 1997 1st round replay	Colchester United	0–0 (a.e.t.) (4–2 p)	Brentford	Colchester
19:45 GMT		Report		Stadium: Layer Road; Attendance: 3,613; Referee: Barry Knight

6 December 1997 2nd round	Colchester United	1–1	Hereford United	Colchester
15:00 GMT	D. Gregory 10'	Report	Grayson 61'	Stadium: Layer Road; Attendance: 3,558; Referee: K Lynch

16 December 1997 2nd round replay	Hereford United	1–1 (a.e.t.) (5–4 p)	Colchester United	Hereford
	Grayson 48'	Report	Forbes 47'	Stadium: Edgar Street; Attendance: 3,725; Referee: K Lynch

=== Football League Trophy ===
9 December 1997 1st round (southern section)	Leyton Orient	1–0	Colchester United	Leyton
	Inglethorpe 51'	Report		Stadium: Brisbane Road; Attendance: 933; Referee: Andy Hall

== Squad statistics ==
=== Appearances and goals ===
No.	Pos	Nat	Player	Total		Third Division		FA Cup		League Cup		Football League Trophy		Football League play-offs	
No.	Pos	Nat	Player	Apps	Goals	Apps	Goals	Apps	Goals	Apps	Goals	Apps	Goals	Apps	Goals
	GK	(England) ENG	Carl Emberson	56	0	46	0	4	0	2	0	1	0	3	0
	DF	(England) ENG	Simon Betts	23	0	17	0	2+1	0	0	0	0	0	3	0
	DF	(England) ENG	Peter Cawley	33	0	27	0	3	0	2	0	1	0	0	0
	DF	(Republic of Ireland) IRL	Joe Dunne	33	2	22+3	2	3+1	0	0	0	1	0	3	0
	DF	(Republic of Ireland) IRL	David Greene	47	5	38	4	4	0	2	0	0	0	3	1
	DF	(England) ENG	Nicky Haydon	20	0	9+8	0	1+1	0	0	0	1	0	0	0
	DF	(England) ENG	Scott Stamps	32	1	26	1	2+1	0	2	0	1	0	0	0
	MF	(England) ENG	Paul Buckle	45	5	33+5	5	1	0	2	0	1	0	3	0
	MF	(England) ENG	Karl Duguid	28	3	6+15	3	3+1	0	0	0	0+1	0	0+2	0
	MF	(England) ENG	Steve Forbes	43	2	25+10	1	2	1	1+1	0	0+1	0	3	0
	MF	(England) ENG	David Gregory	54	10	42+2	5	4	2	2	0	1	0	3	3
	MF	(England) ENG	Aaron Skelton	48	7	37+2	7	3+1	0	1	0	1	0	2+1	0
	MF	(England) ENG	Richard Wilkins	43	5	37	5	2	0	2	0	0	0	2	0
	FW	(England) ENG	Paul Abrahams	30	7	16+9	7	1+1	0	2	0	0	0	1	0
	FW	(England) ENG	Tony Adcock	32	5	19+6	5	3+1	0	0+2	0	1	0	0	0
	FW	(England) ENG	Neil Gregory	18	7	12+3	7	0	0	0	0	0	0	3	0
	FW	(England) ENG	Ian Hathaway	16	1	5+7	0	1+1	0	2	1	0	0	0	0
	FW	(England) ENG	Tony Lock	41	6	14+18	6	0+3	0	0+2	0	0+1	0	0+3	0
	FW	(England) ENG	Mark Sale	48	8	38+1	7	3	1	2	0	1	0	3	0
Players who appeared for Colchester who left during the season
	DF	(England) ENG	Guy Branston	13	1	12	1	0	0	0	0	0	0	1	0
	DF	(England) ENG	Wayne Brown	2	0	0+2	0	0	0	0	0	0	0	0	0
	FW	(England) ENG	Isaiah Rankin	12	5	10+1	5	0	0	0	0	1	0	0	0
	FW	(England) ENG	Steve Whitton	23	1	15+6	1	2	0	0	0	0	0	0	0

=== Goalscorers ===
Place	Nationality	Position	Name	Third Division	FA Cup	League Cup	Football League Trophy	Football League play-offs	Total
1	(England)	MF	David Gregory	5	2	0	0	3	10
2	(England)	FW	Mark Sale	7	1	0	0	0	8
3	(England)	FW/WG	Paul Abrahams	7	0	0	0	0	7
3	(England)	FW	Neil Gregory	7	0	0	0	0	7
3	(England)	MF/DF	Aaron Skelton	7	0	0	0	0	7
6	(England)	FW	Tony Lock	6	0	0	0	0	6
7	(England)	FW	Tony Adcock	5	0	0	0	0	5
7	(England)	MF	Paul Buckle	5	0	0	0	0	5
7	(Republic of Ireland)	CB	David Greene	4	0	0	0	1	5
7	(England)	FW	Isaiah Rankin	5	0	0	0	0	5
7	(England)	MF/DF	Richard Wilkins	5	0	0	0	0	5
12	(England)	MF	Karl Duguid	3	0	0	0	0	3
13	(Republic of Ireland)	FB	Joe Dunne	2	0	0	0	0	2
13	(England)	MF	Steve Forbes	1	1	0	0	0	2
15	(England)	CB	Guy Branston	1	0	0	0	0	1
15	(England)	WG	Ian Hathaway	0	0	1	0	0	1
15	(England)	FB	Scott Stamps	1	0	0	0	0	1
15	(England)	FW	Steve Whitton	1	0	0	0	0	1
			Own goals	0	0	0	0	0	0
			TOTALS	72	4	1	0	4	81

=== Disciplinary record ===
Nationality	Position	Name	Third Division		FA Cup		League Cup		Football League Trophy		Football League play-offs		Total	
Nationality	Position	Name	Booked	Sent off (straight red)	Booked	Sent off (straight red)	Booked	Sent off (straight red)	Booked	Sent off (straight red)	Booked	Sent off (straight red)	Booked	Sent off (straight red)
(Republic of Ireland)	CB	David Greene	5	1	1	0	0	0	0	0	1	0	7	1
(England)	CB	Peter Cawley	5	1	0	0	1	0	0	0	0	0	6	1
(England)	FW	Mark Sale	7	0	1	0	0	0	0	0	1	0	9	0
(Republic of Ireland)	FB	Joe Dunne	3	0	3	0	0	0	1	0	1	0	8	0
(England)	FW	Steve Whitton	7	0	1	0	0	0	0	0	0	0	8	0
(England)	MF	Steve Forbes	6	0	1	0	0	0	0	0	0	0	7	0
(England)	MF	David Gregory	5	0	0	0	0	0	0	0	1	0	6	0
(England)	FB	Scott Stamps	5	0	0	0	1	0	0	0	0	0	6	0
(England)	FW/WG	Paul Abrahams	4	0	0	0	0	0	0	0	1	0	5	0
(England)	FB	Simon Betts	4	0	0	0	0	0	0	0	1	0	5	0
(England)	CB	Guy Branston	1	0	0	0	0	0	0	0	1	1	2	1
(England)	MF	Karl Duguid	3	0	1	0	0	0	1	0	0	0	5	0
(England)	DF/MF	Nicky Haydon	4	0	0	0	0	0	0	0	0	0	4	0
(England)	FW	Tony Lock	4	0	0	0	0	0	0	0	0	0	4	0
(England)	MF	Richard Wilkins	3	0	0	0	0	0	0	0	1	0	4	0
(England)	FW	Tony Adcock	3	0	0	0	0	0	0	0	0	0	3	0
(England)	MF	Paul Buckle	3	0	0	0	0	0	0	0	0	0	3	0
(England)	FW	Neil Gregory	2	0	0	0	0	0	0	0	0	0	2	0
(England)	FW	Isaiah Rankin	2	0	0	0	0	0	0	0	0	0	2	0
(England)	CB	Wayne Brown	0	0	0	0	0	0	1	0	0	0	1	0
(England)	GK	Carl Emberson	1	0	0	0	0	0	0	0	0	0	1	0
(England)	WG	Ian Hathaway	1	0	0	0	0	0	0	0	0	0	1	0
(England)	MF/DF	Aaron Skelton	0	0	1	0	0	0	0	0	0	0	1	0
		TOTALS	74	2	9	0	2	0	3	0	8	1	100	3

=== Clean sheets ===
Number of games goalkeepers kept a clean sheet.

Place	Nationality	Player	Third Division	FA Cup	League Cup	Football League Trophy	Football League play-offs	Total
1	(England)	Carl Emberson	15	1	0	0	1	17
		TOTALS	15	1	0	0	1	17

=== Player debuts ===
Players making their first-team Colchester United debut in a fully competitive match.

Position	Nationality	Player	Date	Opponent	Ground	Notes
WG	(England)	Ian Hathaway	9 August 1997	Darlington	Layer Road	
MF/DF	(England)	Aaron Skelton	9 August 1997	Darlington	Layer Road	
FW	(England)	Isaiah Rankin	27 September 1997	Exeter City	Layer Road	
CB	(England)	Wayne Brown	18 October 1997	Shrewsbury Town	Layer Road	
FW	(England)	Neil Gregory	3 January 1998	Hartlepool United	Layer Road	
CB	(England)	Guy Branston	13 February 1998	Mansfield Town	Layer Road	
FW	(England)	Neil Gregory	3 April 1998	Rotherham United	Layer Road	(Note: Second debut for the club)

== See also ==
- List of Colchester United F.C. seasons
