= 1998 Football League Third Division play-off final =

Association football match

- The final took place at Wembley Stadium.
- Event: 1997–98 Football League Third Division
Colchester United	Torquay United
1	0
- Date: 22 May 1998
- Venue: Wembley Stadium, London
- Referee: Mick Fletcher
- Attendance: 19,486

The 1998 Football League Third Division play-off final was an association football match which was played on 22 May 1998 at Wembley Stadium, London, between Colchester United and Torquay United to determine the fourth and final team to gain promotion from the Football League Third Division to the Second Division for the 1998–99 season. The top three teams of the 1997–98 Football League Third Division, Notts County, Macclesfield Town and Lincoln City, gained automatic promotion to the Second Division, while the teams placed from fourth to seventh place in the table took part in the play-offs. The losing semi-finalists were Scarborough and Barnet.

The referee for the match was Mick Fletcher. It was the first play-off final to feature two brothers: Neil and David Gregory both featured for Colchester United. The game had been brought forward by a day to accommodate a friendly between England and Saudi Arabia. As such, the final kicked off around 7:30 p.m. on Friday 22 May 1998 in front of 19,486 supporters, the lowest attendance ever at a play-off final. Torquay dominated the early stages of the game with Rodney Jack making a number of runs. After 19 minutes, Andy McFarlane struck the ball into the net but the goal was disallowed for offside. Midway through the first half, the ball struck the arm of Jon Gittens and Fletcher awarded a penalty which David Gregory converted, sending the reserve Torquay goalkeeper Matt Gregg the wrong way. Despite chances for both sides, including a penalty appeal for Colchester in the second half, the match ended 1–0 with Colchester being promoted to the Second Division.

Torquay United's manager left the club the following season and they finished their following season in 20th position in the Third Division. Colchester United's next season saw them end in 18th place in the Second Division.

== Route to the final ==
Football League Third Division final table, leading positions
Pos	Team	Pld	W	D	L	GF	GA	GD	Pts
1	Notts County	46	29	12	5	82	43	+39	99
2	Macclesfield Town	46	23	13	10	63	44	+19	82
3	Lincoln City	46	20	15	11	60	51	+9	75
4	Colchester United	46	21	11	14	72	60	+12	74
5	Torquay United	46	21	11	14	68	59	+9	74
6	Scarborough	46	19	15	12	67	58	+9	72
7	Barnet	46	19	13	14	61	51	+10	70

Colchester United finished the regular 1997–98 season in fourth place in the Football League Third Division, the third tier of the English football league system, one place ahead of Torquay United. Both therefore missed out on the three automatic places for promotion to the Second Division and instead took part in the play-offs to determine the fourth promoted team. Colchester United finished one point behind Lincoln City (who were promoted in third place), eight behind second-placed Macclesfield Town and twenty-five behind league winners Notts County. Torquay United ended the season level on points with Colchester United but with an inferior goal difference.

Colchester United faced Barnet in their play-off semi-final and the first match of the two-legged tie was held at Underhill in Chipping Barnet on 11 May 1998. After a goalless first half, Greg Heald scored past Carl Emberson in the Colchester goal three minutes after half-time to give Barnet the lead. In the 82nd minute, both Barnet's Sean Devine and Colchester's Guy Branston were shown a red card for violent conduct, and the match ended 1–0. The return leg was played five days later at Layer Road in Colchester. David Gregory scored with a penalty on 12 minutes to put Colchester ahead after Lee Howarth was adjudged to have handled the ball. Barnet equalised after Warren Goodhind scored with a header from a Sam Stockley cross. Howarth was then sent off in the 59th minute for a professional foul on Gregory before David Greene headed Colchester into the lead from Paul Buckle's free kick, levelling the aggregate score and sending the game into extra time. Five minutes into the first period of additional time, Gregory scored his second goal of the game to send Colchester to the final with a 3–2 aggregate victory.

Torquay United's opponents in their play-off semi-final were Scarborough with the leg being played at the Athletic Ground in Scarborough on 10 May 1998. In the 17th minute, Gareth Williams missed a penalty for the home side before Rodney Jack put Torquay ahead three minutes later. Jason Rockett scored the equaliser five minutes before half-time but after the interval, goals from Jon Gittens and Andy McFarlane secured a 3–1 win for Torquay. The second leg of the semi-final took place six days later at Plainmoor in Torquay. Jack scored a two-minute brace to give Torquay a 2–0 lead within seven minutes, before Rockett scored for Scarborough midway through the half. Williams was then sent off after receiving a second yellow card before Torquay extended their lead with goals from Steve McCall and Paul Gibbs. Liam Robinson was also sent off for Scarborough for serious foul play and the match ended 4–1 to Torquay, who advanced to the final with a 7–2 aggregate win.

== Match ==
=== Background ===
Colchester United had participated in the play-offs on one previous occasion, in 1987, when they failed to progress past the semi-finals, losing on aggregate to Wolverhampton Wanderers. They had played in the fourth tier of English football after gaining promotion from non-League football, winning the Football Conference in 1992 ahead of Wycombe Wanderers on goal difference. Colchester had last played in the third tier in the 1980–81 season. They had played at Wembley Stadium the previous season when they lost to Carlisle United in the 1997 Football League Trophy Final in a penalty shoot-out. Torquay United were making their fourth appearance in the play-offs, having gained promotion by winning the final on one occasion when they defeated Blackpool 5–4 over two legs in the 1988 Football League Fourth Division play-off final. Torquay were relegated back to the fourth tier the following season and had played there since. In the matches between the sides during the regular season, the encounter at Plainmoor in August 1997 ended in a 1–1 draw while Colchester won the return game 1–0 at Layer Road the following January.

The referee for the match was Mick Fletcher. The match had been brought forward from the traditional Saturday afternoon fixture in order to accommodate the friendly between England and Saudi Arabia. Torquay's goalkeeper Ken Veysey was suspended for the final so 19-year-old Matt Gregg, who had last started a game on 31 January, was selected in his place. Colchester's Neil and David Gregory became the first brothers to appear in a play-off final together. Colchester adopted a 4–3–3 formation while Torquay played as a 3–5–2.

=== Summary ===
The match kicked off around 7.45 p.m. on 22 May 1998 in front of 19,486 supporters. Torquay dominated the early stages of the game with Jack making a number of runs. After 19 minutes, McFarlane struck the ball into the net but the goal was disallowed for offside. Midway through the first half, Steve Forbes tried to lift the ball over Torquay's Gittens but the ball struck the defender's arm and the referee awarded a penalty. David Gregory struck the spot-kick into the Torquay goal off the left-hand goalpost having sent the Torquay goalkeeper Gregg the wrong way. Nine minutes later, Neil Gregory was unmarked in the Torquay penalty area but shot wide. Just before half-time, Gittens struck the ball over the bar from 3 yards (3 m) after a shot was blocked on the goal-line by Jamie Robinson. Soon after the interval Simon Betts struck a shot from around 25 yards (23 m) which went under Gregg's body and wide of the post. Forbes was then prevented from shooting when he was tackled after beating three defenders. Torquay began to dominate once again although Colchester were denied a penalty after Gibbs had brought down David Gregory. Torquay then missed numerous chances to score: a strike from Gibbs was deflected wide, Gittens headed the ball over the bar and Jack shot wide. In the 71st minute, Emberson pushed Andy Gurney's shot round the post. Seven minutes later, Mark Sale's header from Joe Dunne's cross was straight at Gregg and the match ended 1–0 with Colchester being promoted to the Second Division.

=== Details ===
22 May 1998
19:30 BST

Colchester United	1–0	Torquay United
Gregory 22' (pen.)	Report

Wembley Stadium, London
Attendance: 19,486
Referee: Mick Fletcher

GK	1	Carl Emberson
DF	2	Joe Dunne
DF	3	Simon Betts	Booked
DF	4	Aaron Skelton		(substituted off) 82'
DF	5	David Greene
MF	6	David Gregory
MF	7	Richard Wilkins	Booked
MF	8	Paul Buckle
MF	11	Steve Forbes
FW	9	Mark Sale	Booked
FW	10	Neil Gregory		(substituted off) 70'
Substitutes:
FW	12	Tony Lock		(substituted in) 70'
MF	13	Karl Duguid		(substituted in) 82'
MF	14	Paul Abrahams
Manager:
Steve Wignall

GK	1	Matt Gregg
DF	2	Andy Gurney
DF	3	Paul Gibbs	Booked
DF	4	Jamie Robinson
DF	5	Jon Gittens
DF	6	Alex Watson
MF	7	Gary Clayton	Booked
MF	8	Chris Leadbitter	Booked
MF	11	Steve McCall	Booked	(substituted off) 72'
FW	9	Rodney Jack	Booked
FW	10	Andy McFarlane		(substituted off) 84'
Substitutes:
FW	12	Tony Bedeau		(substituted in) 72'
DF	13	Wayne Thomas		(substituted in) 84'
MF	14	Kevin Hill
Manager:
Kevin Hodges

== Post-match ==
Steve Wignall, the winning manager, admitted that his club needed to strengthen in order to compete in the Second Division, suggesting that "the hard work starts here." He paid tribute to winning goalscorer David Gregory, noting that he was "one of the unsung heroes ... he has done a tremendous job for the club and he's one of the players at the club who can cope quite easily with Second Division football." The Torquay manager Kevin Hodges left the club the following month to join Plymouth Argyle. The attendance of 19,486 was the lowest ever for a play-off final.

Colchester United's next season saw them end in eighteenth place in the Second Division, three positions and two points above the relegation zone. Torquay United finished their following season in twentieth position in the Third Division, four places and five points above the relegation zone.
