= 1996–97 Colchester United F.C. season =

Colchester United
1996–97 season
- Chairman: Gordon Parker
- Manager: Steve Wignall
- Stadium: Layer Road
- Third Division: 8th
- FA Cup: 1st round (eliminated by Wycombe Wanderers)
- League Cup: 2nd round (eliminated by Huddersfield Town)
- Football League Trophy: Runners-up
- Top goalscorer: League: Tony Adcock (11); All: Tony Adcock (14)
- Highest home attendance: 5,956 v Northampton Town, 26 April 1997
- Lowest home attendance: 1,842 v Scunthorpe United, 19 November 1996
- Average home league attendance: 3,422
- Biggest win: 7–1 v Lincoln City, 30 November 1996
- Biggest defeat: 0–3 v Carlisle United, 1 October 1996 v Darlington, 31 March 1997
Home colours

The 1996–97 season was Colchester United's 55th season in their history and their fifth consecutive season in the fourth tier of English football, the Third Division. Alongside competing in the Third Division, the club also participated in the FA Cup, the League Cup and the Football League Trophy.

Following the play-off disappointment of last season, the U's looked to earn a play-off spot at the very least, but missed out by just one point, finishing in eighth.

Colchester reached the 1997 Football League Trophy Final, reaching Wembley for only the second time where they faced Carlisle United. The score remained 0–0 after extra time but Colchester were defeated 4–3 in a penalty shoot-out.

In the FA Cup, Colchester were eliminated by old foes Wycombe Wanderers in the first round, while Huddersfield Town defeated the U's at the second round stage.

== Season overview ==
Layer Road's Clock End received a makeover during the off season, with a new covered and all seated stand in place.

In the League Cup, Colchester overturned a 3–2 first leg deficit against West Bromwich Albion into victory with a 3–1 win at The Hawthorns with Steve Whitton in goal for the entire second half following an injury to goalkeeper Garrett Caldwell. They were then defeated in the second round by Huddersfield Town.

Colchester made a first round FA Cup exit following defeat by old rivals Wycombe Wanderers.

In September, Mark Kinsella made a move to Charlton Athletic for £150,000.

Paul Buckle scored Colchester's first-ever golden goal in the Football League Trophy against Millwall following a first round win against Cambridge United. In the area quarter-final, the U's dispatched Brentford and then Northampton Town in the semi-final. Colchester then overturned a 2–0 deficit from the first leg of the area final with Peterborough United to win 3–0 after extra time to set up a Wembley final with Carlisle United.

In the final with 45,077 in attendance, neither side could find a breakthrough, and the tie went to extra time following a goalless 90 minutes. Another goalless 30 minutes followed and the match went to a penalty shoot-out. The U's took the lead in the shoot-out after Owen Archdeacon missed Carlisle's second effort, but consecutive misses from youth team product Karl Duguid and Peter Cawley meant that Steve Hayward's converted effort won the shoot-out for Carlisle 4–3.

In the league, six defeats in eight league matches saw Colchester slip to 13th in the table. Manager Steve Wignall said:

I won't be happy until I have guided this club to promotion. All I ask of the fans is trust me with your club.

Colchester ended the season in 8th position, one point shy of the play-off positions.

== Players ==
As of match played 3 May 1997.

Name	Position	Nationality	Place of birth	Date of birth	Apps	Goals	Signed from	Date signed	Fee
Goalkeepers
Garrett Caldwell	GK	(Canada)	(United States) Princeton	6 November 1973 (aged 22)	1	0	(United States) Princeton Tigers	25 September 1995	Free transfer
Carl Emberson	GK	(England)	Epsom	13 July 1973 (aged 22)	84	0	(England) Millwall	6 July 1994	£25,000
Defenders
Simon Betts	FB	(England)	Middlesbrough	3 March 1973 (aged 23)	158	10	(England) Scarborough	11 December 1992	Free transfer
Peter Cawley	CB	(England)	Walton-on-Thames	15 September 1965 (aged 30)	147	8	(England) Barnet	30 October 1992 (Note: Date of signing refers to the date of the player's first game in his second spell for the club)	Free transfer
Joe Dunne	FB	(Republic of Ireland)	Dublin	25 May 1973 (aged 23)	5	1	(England) Gillingham	27 March 1996	Free transfer
Paul Gibbs	FB	(England)	Gorleston	26 October 1972 (aged 23)	37	3	(England) Diss Town	6 March 1995	Undisclosed
David Greene	CB	(Republic of Ireland)	(England) Luton	26 October 1973 (aged 22)	16	1	(England) Luton Town	21 June 1996	£30,000
Nicky Haydon	DF/MF	(England)	Barking	10 August 1978 (aged 17)	0	0	Youth team	1 August 1995	Free transfer
Tony McCarthy	CB	(Republic of Ireland)	Dublin	9 November 1969 (aged 26)	63	1	(England) Millwall	17 March 1995	Free transfer
Andy Partner	CB	(England)	Colchester	21 October 1974 (aged 21)	5	0	Apprentice	16 December 1991 (Note: Date of signing refers to the date of the player's first game for the club)	Free transfer
Scott Stamps	FB	(England)	Edgbaston	20 March 1975 (aged 21)	0	0	(England) Torquay United	26 March 1997	£15,000
Midfielders
Paul Buckle	MF	(England)	Hatfield	16 December 1970 (aged 25)	0	0	(England) Wycombe Wanderers	28 November 1996	Free transfer
Ernie Cooksey	MF	(England)	Bishop's Stortford	11 June 1980 (aged 15)	0	0	Youth team	Summer 1996	Free transfer
Karl Duguid	MF	(England)	Letchworth	21 March 1978 (aged 18)	17	1	Youth team	9 December 1995	Free transfer
Steve Forbes	MF	(England)	Stoke Newington	24 December 1975 (aged 20)	0	0	(England) Millwall	14 March 1997	Free transfer
Chris Fry	MF/WG	(Wales)	Cardiff	23 October 1969 (aged 26)	100	10	(England) Hereford United	24 October 1993	Nominal
David Gregory	MF	(England)	Sudbury	23 January 1970 (aged 26)	10	0	(England) Peterborough United	8 December 1995	Free transfer
Adam Locke	MF/FB	(England)	Croydon	20 August 1970 (aged 25)	64	4	(England) Southend United	23 September 1994	Free transfer
Richard Wilkins	MF/DF	(England)	Lambeth	28 May 1965 (aged 31)	180	31	(England) Hereford United	3 July 1996	£17,500
Forwards
Paul Abrahams	FW/WG	(England)	Colchester	31 October 1973 (aged 22)	83	15	(England) Brentford	23 October 1996	£20,000
Tony Adcock	FW	(England)	Bethnal Green	27 March 1963 (aged 33)	267	129	(England) Luton Town	3 August 1995	Free transfer
Tony Lock	FW	(England)	Harlow	3 September 1976 (aged 19)	3	1	Apprentice	28 January 1995	Free transfer
Mark Sale	FW	(England)	Burton upon Trent	27 February 1972 (aged 24)	0	0	(England) Mansfield Town	10 March 1997	£23,500
Steve Whitton	FW	(England)	East Ham	4 December 1960 (aged 35)	68	17	(England) Ipswich Town	24 March 1994	£10,000

== Transfers ==
=== In ===
Date	Position	Nationality	Name	From	Fee	Ref.
Summer 1996	MF	(England)	Ernie Cooksey	Youth team	Free transfer	
21 June 1996	CB	(Republic of Ireland)	David Green	(England) Luton Town	£30,000	
3 July 1996	MF/DF	(England)	Richard Wilkins	(England) Hereford United	£17,500	
5 August 1996	FB	(England)	David Barnes	(England) Watford	Free transfer	
11 October 1996	WG	(England)	Tony Kelly	(England) Millwall	Trial	
23 October 1996	FW/WG	(England)	Paul Abrahams	(England) Brentford	£20,000	
28 November 1996	MF	(England)	Paul Buckle	(England) Wycombe Wanderers	Free transfer	
17 February 1997	MF	(England)	Geoff Pitcher	(England) Kingstonian	Trial	
10 March 1997	FW	(England)	Mark Sale	(England) Mansfield Town	£23,500	
14 March 1997	MF	(England)	Steve Forbes	(England) Millwall	Free transfer	
26 March 1997	FB	(England)	Scott Stamps	(England) Torquay United	£15,000	

- Total spending: ▼ ~ £106,000

=== Out ===
Date	Position	Nationality	Name	To	Fee	Ref.
End of season	MF	(England)	Tony Cook	(England) Berkhamsted Town	Undisclosed	
Summer 1996	CB	(England)	Ben Lewis	(England) Southend United	Released	
31 May 1996	MF	(England)	Steve Ball	(England) Sudbury Town	Free transfer	
31 May 1996	CB	(England)	Gus Caesar	(England) Dagenham & Redbridge	Released	
31 May 1996	DF/MF	(England)	Tony English	(England) Sudbury Town	Free transfer	
30 July 1996	MF	(England)	Tony Dennis	(England) Lincoln City	Released	
September 1996	FB	(England)	Jean Dalli	(England) Dover Athletic	Free transfer	
20 September 1996	MF	(Republic of Ireland)	Mark Kinsella	(England) Charlton Athletic	£150,000	
19 October 1996	WG	(England)	Tony Kelly	(England) St Albans City	End of trial	
13 February 1997	FW	(England)	Robbie Reinelt	(England) Brighton & Hove Albion	£15,000	
1 March 1997	FB	(England)	David Barnes	Free agent	Retired	
14 March 1997	MF	(England)	Geoff Pitcher	(England) Kingstonian	End of trial	(Note: Date of departure refers to the date of the player's final game for the club)

- Total incoming: ▲ ~ £165,000

=== Loans in ===
Date	Position	Nationality	Name	From	End date	Ref.
8 November 1996	FW	(England)	John Taylor	(England) Luton Town	26 December 1996	
3 February 1997	GK	(England)	John Vaughan	(England) Lincoln City	28 February 1997	

=== Loans out ===
Date	Position	Nationality	Name	To	End date	Ref.
4 October 1996	FW	(England)	Tony Lock	(England) Chelmsford City	4 November 1996	

== Match details ==
=== Third Division ===
==== Results round by round ====
Round	1	2	3	4	5	6	7	8	9	10	11	12	13	14	15	16	17	18	19	20	21	22	23	24	25	26	27	28	29	30	31	32	33	34	35	36	37	38	39	40	41	42	43	44	45	46
Ground	H	A	A	H	A	H	H	A	H	A	A	H	H	A	A	H	H	A	H	A	H	A	A	H	A	A	H	H	A	H	H	A	H	A	H	A	H	H	A	H	A	A	H	A	H	A
Result	L	D	D	D	L	W	D	D	D	L	D	W	W	L	L	W	D	W	D	W	W	D	D	D	D	D	W	D	W	W	W	W	D	L	L	L	W	W	L	L	L	L	W	W	D	W
Position	24	22	20	21	22	17	17	16	19	22	18	17	13	16	20	16	16	13	12	10	7	8	8	8	9	11	7	8	7	7	6	6	6	6	7	8	8	6	7	10	12	12	8	7	9	8

Source: 11v11.com
A = Away; H = Home; W = Win; D = Draw; L = Loss

==== League table ====
Pos	Team	Pld	W	D	L	GF	GA	GD	Pts	Promotion or relegation
6	Chester City	46	18	16	12	55	43	+12	70	Qualification for the Third Division play-offs
7	Cardiff City	46	20	9	17	57	55	+2	69	Qualification for the Third Division play-offs
8	Colchester United	46	17	17	12	62	51	+11	68	
9	Lincoln City	46	18	12	16	70	69	+1	66	
10	Cambridge United	46	18	11	17	53	59	−6	65	

Rules for classification: In the Football League goals scored (GF) takes precedence over goal difference (GD).

==== Matches ====
17 August 1996 1	Colchester United	0–2	Hartlepool United	Colchester
15:00 BST	McCarthy (yellow card) 40' (red card)	Report	Allon 52'; McAuley 60'	Stadium: Layer Road; Attendance: 2,942; Referee: P Robinson

24 August 1996 2	Rochdale	0–0	Colchester United	Rochdale
		Report		Stadium: Spotland Stadium; Attendance: 1,816; Referee: D Laws

27 August 1996 3	Darlington	1–1	Colchester United	Darlington
	Atkinson 1' (pen.)	Report	Locke 44'	Stadium: Feethams; Attendance: 2,906; Referee: Roger Furnandiz

31 August 1996 4	Colchester United	1–1	Hereford United	Colchester
	Reinelt 79'	Report	Smith 63'	Stadium: Layer Road; Attendance: 2,723; Referee: M Fletcher

7 September 1996 5	Fulham	3–1	Colchester United	Fulham
	Conroy 5', 51'; Morgan 79'	Report	Whitton 66'	Stadium: Craven Cottage; Attendance: 5,189; Referee: Andy D'Urso

10 September 1996 6	Colchester United	2–0	Brighton & Hove Albion	Colchester
19:45 BST	Kinsella 24'; Reinelt 53'	Report		Stadium: Layer Road; Attendance: 2,540; Referee: Barry Knight

14 September 1996 7	Colchester United	1–1	Hull City	Colchester
15:00 BST	Kinsella 50'	Report	Gordon 52'	Stadium: Layer Road; Attendance: 3,073; Referee: Rob Styles

21 September 1996 8	Leyton Orient	1–1	Colchester United	Leyton
	Channing 69'	Report	Fry 52'; Cawley (yellow card) 51' (red card)	Stadium: Brisbane Road; Attendance: 5,254; Referee: Mark Halsey

28 September 1996 9	Colchester United	2–2	Doncaster Rovers	Colchester
15:00 BST	Cawley 26'; Adcock 40'	Report	Colcombe 29'; Schofield 39' (pen.)	Stadium: Layer Road; Attendance: 2,672; Referee: Paul Taylor

1 October 1996 10	Carlisle United	3–0	Colchester United	Carlisle
	Currie 43'; Reeves 57'; Archdeacon 58'	Report		Stadium: Brunton Park; Attendance: 4,089; Referee: Terry Heilbron

4 October 1996 11	Swansea City	1–1	Colchester United	Swansea
	Torpey 38'	Report	Greene 4'	Stadium: Vetch Field; Attendance: 2,531; Referee: Fraser Stretton

12 October 1996 12	Colchester United	3–1	Wigan Athletic	Colchester
15:00 BST	Adcock 69'; Gregory 76'; Duguid 80'	Report	Sharp 41'; Kilford (yellow card) (red card)	Stadium: Layer Road; Attendance: 2,700; Referee: C Finch

15 October 1996 13	Colchester United	1–0	Barnet	Colchester
19:45 BST	Fry 81'	Report		Stadium: Layer Road; Attendance: 2,732; Referee: R Poulain

19 October 1996 14	Northampton Town	2–1	Colchester United	Northampton
	Parrish 45'; Grayson 55'	Report	Fry 41'	Stadium: Sixfields Stadium; Attendance: 4,119; Referee: Steve Baines

26 October 1996 15	Lincoln City	3–2	Colchester United	Lincoln
	Ainsworth 32'; Martin 59'; Greene 62' (o.g.); Bos (red card) 75'	Report	Betts 26' (pen.); Duguid 43' (pen.); Whitton (yellow card) 67' (red card)	Stadium: Sincil Bank; Attendance: 2,768; Referee: A Butler

29 October 1996 16	Colchester United	1–0	Exeter City	Colchester
19:45 GMT	Myers 61' (o.g.)	Report		Stadium: Layer Road; Attendance: 2,384; Referee: G Pooley

2 November 1996 17	Colchester United	1–1	Cardiff City	Colchester
15:00 GMT	Duguid 18'	Report	White 57' (pen.)	Stadium: Layer Road; Attendance: 3,226; Referee: Rob Harris

9 November 1996 18	Torquay United	0–2	Colchester United	Torquay
		Report	Reinelt 62'; Abrahams 90'	Stadium: Plainmoor; Attendance: 2,251; Referee: M Pierce

19 November 1996 19	Colchester United	1–1	Scunthorpe United	Colchester
19:45 GMT	Sertori 71' (o.g.)	Report	Clarkson 59'	Stadium: Layer Road; Attendance: 1,842; Referee: Clive Wilkes

22 November 1996 20	Chester City	1–2	Colchester United	Chester
	Whelan 53'	Report	Taylor 7', 19'	Stadium: Deva Stadium; Attendance: 2,028; Referee: Graham Laws

30 November 1996 21	Colchester United	7–1	Lincoln City	Colchester
15:00 GMT	Abrahams 19'; Taylor 42' (pen.), 45' (pen.); Whitton 61'; Adcock 83'; Fry 86', 90'	Report	Martin 64'	Stadium: Layer Road; Attendance: 2,738; Referee: D Orr

3 December 1996 22	Scarborough	1–1	Colchester United	Scarborough
	Mitchell 52'	Report	Locke 24'	Stadium: Athletic Ground; Attendance: 1,605; Referee: Roger Furnandiz

14 December 1996 23	Mansfield Town	1–1	Colchester United	Mansfield
	Sale 90'	Report	Abrahams 73'	Stadium: Field Mill; Attendance: 1,653; Referee: Terry Heilbron

20 December 1996 24	Colchester United	2–2	Cambridge United	Colchester
19:45 GMT	Taylor 60'; Adcock 90'	Report	Beall 39'; Raynor 63'	Stadium: Layer Road; Attendance: 3,707; Referee: Neale Barry

26 December 1996 25	Brighton & Hove Albion	1–1	Colchester United	Hove
	Mundee 34' (pen.)	Report	Whitton 15'	Stadium: Goldstone Ground; Attendance: 4,830; Referee: Alan Wiley

11 January 1997 26	Doncaster Rovers	0–0	Colchester United	Doncaster
		Report		Stadium: Belle Vue; Attendance: 1,458; Referee: Uriah Rennie

14 January 1997 27	Colchester United	2–1	Fulham	Colchester
15:00 GMT	Abrahams 43'; Fry 71'; Greene (yellow card) 67' (red card)	Report	Morgan 65'	Stadium: Layer Road; Attendance: 3,820; Referee: M Bailey

18 January 1997 28	Colchester United	1–1	Carlisle United	Colchester
15:00 GMT	Adcock 4' (pen.); Reinelt (yellow card) 67' (red card) 70'	Report	Archdeacon 34'	Stadium: Layer Road; Attendance: 3,588; Referee: Paul Taylor

25 January 1997 29	Exeter City	0–3	Colchester United	Exeter
		Report	Abrahams 15'; Locke 28', 55'	Stadium: St James Park; Attendance: 2,666; Referee: J Brandwood

31 January 1997 30	Colchester United	2–0	Torquay United	Colchester
19:45 GMT	Adcock 44', 56'	Report		Stadium: Layer Road; Attendance: 3,895; Referee: Steve Baines

4 February 1997 31	Colchester United	2–1	Leyton Orient	Colchester
	Wilkins 11', 75'	Report	Channing 33'	Stadium: Layer Road; Attendance: 3,689; Referee: Steve Bennett

8 February 1997 32	Cardiff City	1–2	Colchester United	Cardiff
	Haworth 90'	Report	Adcock 6'; Whitton 20'	Stadium: Ninian Park; Attendance: 3,912; Referee: G Singh

14 February 1997 33	Colchester United	0–0	Chester City	Colchester
19:45 GMT		Report		Stadium: Layer Road; Attendance: 3,855; Referee: J Kirkby

22 February 1997 34	Scunthorpe United	2–1	Colchester United	Scunthorpe
	D'Auria 50'; Jones 61'	Report	Whitton 89'	Stadium: Glanford Park; Attendance: 2,738; Referee: D Laws

28 February 1997 35	Colchester United	1–3	Scarborough	Colchester
19:45 GMT	Adcock 24'	Report	Williams 36', 70'; Rigby 74'	Stadium: Layer Road; Attendance: 3,719; Referee: D Crick

7 March 1997 36	Cambridge United	1–0	Colchester United	Cambridge
	Wanless 6'	Report	Lock (red card) 38'	Stadium: Abbey Stadium; Attendance: 3,485; Referee: Clive Wilkes

14 March 1997 37	Colchester United	2–1	Mansfield Town	Colchester
19:45 GMT	Greene 37'; Adcock 42'	Report	Dunne 82' (o.g.); Doolan (red card) 46'; Harper (red card) 83'	Stadium: Layer Road; Attendance: 3,064; Referee: Andy D'Urso

21 March 1997 38	Colchester United	1–0	Rochdale	Colchester
19:45 GMT	Abrahams 59'	Report		Stadium: Layer Road; Attendance: 3,211; Referee: Alan Wiley

29 March 1997 39	Hartlepool United	1–0	Colchester United	Hartlepool
	Beech 78'	Report	McCarthy (yellow card) 36' (red card)	Stadium: Victoria Park; Attendance: 2,725; Referee: Anthony Leake

31 March 1997 40	Colchester United	0–3	Darlington	Colchester
15:00 BST		Report	Naylor 2', 13', 73' (pen.)	Stadium: Layer Road; Attendance: 3,604; Referee: G Pooley

5 April 1997 41	Hereford United	1–0	Colchester United	Hereford
	McGorry 45'	Report		Stadium: Edgar Street; Attendance: 2,535; Referee: Rob Styles

8 April 1997 42	Wigan Athletic	1–0	Colchester United	Wigan
	McGibbon 45'	Report		Stadium: Springfield Park; Attendance: 4,571; Referee: K Lynch

11 April 1997 43	Colchester United	3–1	Swansea City	Colchester
19:45 BST	Whitton 22'; Sale 56'; Abrahams 66'	Report	Mølby 58'	Stadium: Layer Road; Attendance: 3,162; Referee: Roger Furnandiz

15 April 1997 44	Hull City	1–2	Colchester United	Kingston upon Hull
	Darby 19' (yellow card) 36' (red card) 49'	Report	Adcock 22'; Sale 27'	Stadium: Boothferry Park; Attendance: 2,035; Referee: R Pearson

26 April 1997 45	Colchester United	0–0	Northampton Town	Colchester
15:00 BST		Report		Stadium: Layer Road; Attendance: 5,956; Referee: Paul Rejer

3 May 1997 46	Barnet	2–4	Colchester United	Chipping Barnet
	Campbell 6'; Hodges 58'	Report	Lock 14'; Sale 35'; Forbes 56'; Haydon 86'	Stadium: Underhill Stadium; Attendance: 1,909; Referee: Rob Harris

=== League Cup ===
20 August 1996 1st round 1st leg	Colchester United	2–3	West Bromwich Albion	Colchester
19:45 BST	Kinsella 1'; Fry 76'	Report	Hunt 22'; Hamilton 71'; Donovan 85'	Stadium: Layer Road; Attendance: 3,521; Referee: D Orr

3 September 1996 1st round 2nd leg	West Bromwich Albion	1–3	Colchester United	West Bromwich
	Groves 83'	Report	Reinelt 22', 49'; Dunne 53'	Stadium: The Hawthorns; Attendance: 9,809
Note: Colchester win 5–4 on aggregate

17 September 1996 2nd round 1st leg	Huddersfield Town	1–1	Colchester United	Huddersfield
	Cowan 45'	Report	Adcock 46'	Stadium: Kirklees Stadium; Attendance: 5,112; Referee: Steve Baines

24 September 1996 2nd round 2nd leg	Colchester United	0–2 (a.e.t.)	Huddersfield Town	Colchester
19:45 BST		Report	Stewart 98'; Collins 110'	Stadium: Layer Road; Attendance: 4,095; Referee: M Pierce
Note: Huddersfield win 3–1 on aggregate

=== FA Cup ===
16 November 1996 1st round	Colchester United	1–2	Wycombe Wanderers	Colchester
15:00 GMT	Wilkins 69'	Report	de Souza 43'; Williams 65'	Stadium: Layer Road; Attendance: 4,378; Referee: Jeff Winter

=== Football League Trophy ===
10 December 1996 1st round (southern section)	Cambridge United	0–1	Colchester United	Cambridge
		Report	Whitton 89'	Stadium: Abbey Stadium; Attendance: 1,108; Referee: Scott Mathieson

7 January 1997 2nd round (southern section)	Millwall	2–3 (a.e.t.)	Colchester United	Bermondsey
	Crawford 10'; Savage 76'	Report	Adcock 53', 88'; Buckle 93'	Stadium: The Den; Attendance: 2,795; Referee: Rob Harris

28 January 1997 Quarter-final (southern section)	Brentford	0–1	Colchester United	Brentford
		Report	Abrahams 35'	Stadium: Griffin Park; Attendance: 2,253; Referee: K Leach

18 February 1997 Semi-final (southern section)	Colchester United	2–1	Northampton Town	Colchester
19:45 GMT	Greene 66'; Buckle 75'; Vaughan (red card) 22'	Report	Martin 67'	Stadium: Layer Road; Attendance: 3,978; Referee: Neale Barry

11 March 1997 Southern section final 1st leg	Peterborough United	2–0	Colchester United	Peterborough
	Otto 14'; Charlery 35'	Report		Stadium: London Road Stadium; Attendance: 4,556; Referee: William Burns

18 March 1997 Southern section final 2nd leg	Colchester United	3–0 (a.e.t.)	Peterborough United	Colchester
19:45 GMT	Fry 38'; Buckle 80'; Abrahams 100'	Report	Charlery (yellow card) (red card)	Stadium: Layer Road; Attendance: 5,000; Referee: Uriah Rennie
Note: Colchester win 3–2 on aggregate

20 April 1997 Final	Colchester United	0–0 (a.e.t.) (3–4 p)	Carlisle United	Wembley
13:30 BST		Report; Report		Stadium: Wembley Stadium; Attendance: 45,077; Referee: J Kirkby
	Penalties
	Conway (penalty scored); Archdeacon (penalty missed); Walling (penalty scored); Aspinall (penalty scored); Hayward (penalty scored)		Wilkins (penalty scored); Adcock (penalty scored); Greene (penalty scored); Duguid (penalty missed); Cawley (penalty missed)

== Squad statistics ==
=== Appearances and goals ===
No.	Pos	Nat	Player	Total		Third Division		FA Cup		League Cup		Football League Trophy	
No.	Pos	Nat	Player	Apps	Goals	Apps	Goals	Apps	Goals	Apps	Goals	Apps	Goals
	GK	(Canada) CAN	Garrett Caldwell	7	0	5	0	0	0	2	0	0	0
	GK	(England) ENG	Carl Emberson	45	0	36	0	1	0	2	0	6	0
	DF	(England) ENG	Simon Betts	14	1	10	1	0	0	4	0	0	0
	DF	(England) ENG	Peter Cawley	37	1	28	1	1	0	4	0	3+1	0
	DF	(Republic of Ireland) IRL	Joe Dunne	42	1	23+12	0	1	0	3	1	2+1	0
	DF	(England) ENG	Paul Gibbs	27	0	18+2	0	1	0	0	0	5+1	0
	DF	(Republic of Ireland) IRL	David Greene	55	3	44	2	1	0	4	0	6	1
	DF	(England) ENG	Nicky Haydon	1	1	0+1	1	0	0	0	0	0	0
	DF	(Republic of Ireland) IRL	Tony McCarthy	43	0	34+1	0	0	0	3	0	5	0
	DF	(England) ENG	Scott Stamps	8	0	7+1	0	0	0	0	0	0	0
	MF	(England) ENG	Paul Buckle	29	3	24	0	0	0	0	0	5	3
	MF	(England) ENG	Karl Duguid	25	3	10+10	3	0+1	0	0+2	0	1+1	0
	MF	(England) ENG	Steve Forbes	1	1	1	1	0	0	0	0	0	0
	MF	(Wales) WAL	Chris Fry	54	8	31+11	6	1	0	2+2	1	6+1	1
	MF	(England) ENG	David Gregory	48	1	32+6	1	1	0	1+1	0	7	0
	MF	(England) ENG	Adam Locke	44	4	22+10	4	1	0	3+1	0	4+3	0
	MF	(England) ENG	Richard Wilkins	50	3	40	2	1	1	3	0	6	0
	FW	(England) ENG	Paul Abrahams	36	9	27+2	7	1	0	0	0	5+1	2
	FW	(England) ENG	Tony Adcock	47	14	26+10	11	0+1	0	3+1	1	6	2
	FW	(England) ENG	Tony Lock	7	1	1+5	1	0	0	0	0	0+1	0
	FW	(England) ENG	Mark Sale	13	3	10	3	0	0	0	0	2+1	0
	FW	(England) ENG	Steve Whitton	47	7	36+3	6	0	0	2+1	0	5	1
Players who appeared for Colchester who left during the season
	GK	(England) ENG	John Vaughan	6	0	5	0	0	0	0	0	1	0
	DF	(England) ENG	David Barnes	13	0	11	0	0	0	1	0	1	0
	MF	(Republic of Ireland) IRL	Mark Kinsella	10	3	7	2	0	0	3	1	0	0
	MF	(England) ENG	Geoff Pitcher	1	0	0+1	0	0	0	0	0	0	0
	FW	(England) ENG	Tony Kelly	3	0	2+1	0	0	0	0	0	0	0
	FW	(England) ENG	Robbie Reinelt	26	5	8+13	3	1	0	4	2	0	0
	FW	(England) ENG	John Taylor	9	5	8	5	0	0	0	0	1	0

=== Goalscorers ===
Place	Nationality	Position	Name	Third Division	FA Cup	League Cup	Football League Trophy	Total
1	(England)	FW	Tony Adcock	11	0	1	2	14
2	(England)	FW/WG	Paul Abrahams	7	0	0	2	9
3	(Wales)	MF/WG	Chris Fry	6	0	1	1	8
4	(England)	FW	Steve Whitton	6	0	0	1	7
5	(England)	FW	Robbie Reinelt	3	0	2	0	5
5	(England)	FW	John Taylor	5	0	0	0	5
7	(England)	MF/FB	Adam Locke	4	0	0	0	4
8	(England)	MF	Paul Buckle	0	0	0	3	3
8	(England)	MF	Karl Duguid	3	0	0	0	3
8	(Republic of Ireland)	CB	David Greene	2	0	0	1	3
8	(Republic of Ireland)	MF	Mark Kinsella	2	0	1	0	3
8	(England)	FW	Mark Sale	3	0	0	0	3
8	(England)	MF/DF	Richard Wilkins	2	1	0	0	3
14	(England)	FB	Simon Betts	1	0	0	0	1
14	(England)	CB	Peter Cawley	1	0	0	0	1
14	(Republic of Ireland)	FB	Joe Dunne	0	0	1	0	1
14	(England)	MF	Steve Forbes	1	0	0	0	1
14	(England)	MF	David Gregory	1	0	0	0	1
14	(England)	DF/MF	Nicky Haydon	1	0	0	0	1
14	(England)	FW	Tony Lock	1	0	0	0	1
			Own goals	2	0	0	0	2
			TOTALS	62	1	6	10	79

=== Disciplinary record ===
Nationality	Position	Name	Third Division		FA Cup		League Cup		Football League Trophy		Total	
Nationality	Position	Name	Booked	Sent off (straight red)	Booked	Sent off (straight red)	Booked	Sent off (straight red)	Booked	Sent off (straight red)	Booked	Sent off (straight red)
(Republic of Ireland)	CB	David Greene	6	1	0	0	1	0	0	0	7	1
(Republic of Ireland)	CB	Tony McCarthy	4	2	0	0	0	0	0	0	4	2
(England)	CB	Peter Cawley	4	1	0	0	1	0	0	0	5	1
(England)	FW	Robbie Reinelt	5	1	0	0	0	0	0	0	5	1
(England)	FW	Steve Whitton	4	1	0	0	0	0	0	0	4	1
(England)	MF	Paul Buckle	5	0	0	0	0	0	0	0	5	0
(England)	FB	David Barnes	2	0	0	0	1	0	0	0	3	0
(Wales)	MF/WG	Chris Fry	2	0	0	0	1	0	0	0	3	0
(England)	FB	Paul Gibbs	3	0	0	0	0	0	0	0	3	0
(England)	FW	Tony Lock	0	1	0	0	0	0	0	0	0	1
(England)	GK	John Vaughan	0	0	0	0	0	0	0	1	0	1
(England)	FW/WG	Paul Abrahams	2	0	0	0	0	0	0	0	2	0
(England)	FW	Tony Adcock	2	0	0	0	0	0	0	0	2	0
(England)	GK	Carl Emberson	2	0	0	0	0	0	0	0	2	0
(England)	MF	David Gregory	2	0	0	0	0	0	0	0	2	0
(England)	MF/FB	Adam Locke	2	0	0	0	0	0	0	0	2	0
(England)	MF/DF	Richard Wilkins	2	0	0	0	0	0	0	0	2	0
(England)	FB	Simon Betts	1	0	0	0	0	0	0	0	1	0
(Republic of Ireland)	FB	Joe Dunne	1	0	0	0	0	0	0	0	1	0
(England)	DF/MF	Nicky Haydon	1	0	0	0	0	0	0	0	1	0
		TOTALS	50	7	0	0	4	0	0	1	54	8

=== Clean sheets ===
Number of games goalkeepers kept a clean sheet.

Place	Nationality	Player	Third Division	FA Cup	League Cup	Football League Trophy	Total
1	(England)	Carl Emberson	8	0	0	4	12
2	(Canada)	Garrett Caldwell	2	0	0	0	2
3	(England)	John Vaughan	1	0	0	0	1
		TOTALS	11	0	0	4	15

=== Player debuts ===
Players making their first-team Colchester United debut in a fully competitive match.

Position	Nationality	Player	Date	Opponent	Ground	Notes
FB	(England)	David Barnes	17 August 1996	Hartlepool United	Layer Road	
CB	(Republic of Ireland)	David Greene	17 August 1996	Hartlepool United	Layer Road	(Note: Second debut for the club)
MF/DF	(England)	Richard Wilkins	27 August 1996	Darlington	Feethams	
WG	(England)	Tony Kelly	12 October 1996	Wigan Athletic	Layer Road	
FW/WG	(England)	Paul Abrahams	26 October 1996	Lincoln City	Sincil Bank	
FW	(England)	John Taylor	9 November 1996	Torquay United	Plainmoor	
MF	(England)	Paul Buckle	14 December 1996	Mansfield Town	Field Mill	
GK	(England)	John Vaughan	4 February 1997	Leyton Orient	Layer Road	
FW	(England)	Mark Sale	11 March 1997	Peterborough United	London Road Stadium	
MF	(England)	Geoff Pitcher	14 March 1997	Mansfield Town	Layer Road	
FB	(England)	Scott Stamps	29 March 1997	Hartlepool United	Victoria Park	
MF	(England)	Steve Forbes	3 May 1997	Barnet	Underhill Stadium	
DF/MF	(England)	Nicky Haydon	3 May 1997	Barnet	Underhill Stadium	

== See also ==
- List of Colchester United F.C. seasons
