= 1996–97 Torquay United F.C. season =

Torquay United
1996–97 season
- Chairman: Mike Bateson
- Manager: Kevin Hodges
- Division Three: 21st
- FA Cup: First Round
- League Cup: First round
- League Trophy: Second round
- Top goalscorer: League: Rodney Jack (10); All: Rodney Jack (10)
- Highest home attendance: 4,021 (vs. Exeter City, 31 August 1996, Division Three)
- Lowest home attendance: 1,087 (vs. Rochdale, 3 December 1996, Division Three)
- Average home league attendance: 2,380
Home colours

The 1996–97 Torquay United F.C. season was Torquay United's 63rd season in the Football League and their fifth consecutive season in Division Three. The season runs from 1 July 1996 to 30 June 1997.

== Player statistics ==
(not including Football League Trophy or FA Cup)

Player	League apps	League goals	Cup apps	Cup goals	Total apps	Total goals
(England) Paul Adcock	1	0	1	0	1	0
(England) Paul Baker	10	4	2	3	12	7
(England) Lee Barrow	42	0	2	0	44	0
(Grenada) Tony Bedeau	8	1	0	0	8	1
(England) Dean Chandler	3	0	0	0	3	0
(England) Steve Crane	2	0	0	0	2	0
(England) Jon Gittens	31	3	2	0	33	3
(England) Matt Gregg	1	0	0	0	1	0
(England) Neil Gregory	5	0	0	0	7	0
(England) Richard Hancox	10	0	2	0	12	0
(England) Leon Hapgood	1	0	0	0	1	0
(England) Ian Hathaway	31	1	1	0	32	1
(Scotland) Mark Hawthorne	33	2	1	0	34	2
(England) Danny Hinshelwood	6	0	0	0	6	0
(England) Wayne Hockley	2	0	0	0	2	0
(England) Kevin Hodges	1	0	0	0	1	0
(England) Jamie Howell	3	0	0	0	3	0
(Saint Vincent and the Grenadines) Rodney Jack	30	10	2	0	32	10
(England) Ellis Laight	10	1	0	0	10	1
(England) Steve McCall	23	1	2	0	25	1
(England) Andy McFarlane	17	3	0	0	17	3
(England) Paul Mitchell	22	0	2	0	24	0
(England) Jamie Ndah	11	1	0	0	11	1
(England) Garry Nelson	30	8	2	0	32	8
(England) Ray Newland	8	0	2	0	10	0
(England) Charlie Oatway	37	1	2	0	39	1
(England) Michael Preston	2	0	0	0	2	0
(England) Scott Stamps	28	3	0	0	28	3
(England) Anthony Thirlby	3	0	0	0	3	0
(England) Wayne Thomas	12	0	0	0	12	0
(England) Lee Tucker	1	0	0	0	1	0
(England) Alex Watson	42	1	2	0	44	1
(Wales) Rhys Wilmot	33	0	0	0	33	0
(England) Steve Winter	36	6	1	0	37	6
(England) Matthew Wright	8	0	0	0	8	0
