= Stephen Forbes =

Stephen Forbes may refer to:

- Stephen Alfred Forbes (1844–1930), American zoologist and ecologist
- Steve Forbes (boxer) (born 1977), American boxer
- Steve Forbes (basketball) (born 1965), American college basketball head coach
- Steve Forbes (born 1947), American businessman and politician
- Steve Forbes (footballer) (born 1975), English association footballer
