= Veysey =

Veysey is a surname. Notable people with the surname include:

- John Veysey (c. 1462–1554), Bishop of Exeter
- Ken Veysey (born 1967), English football player
- Sidney Veysey (born 1955), Canadian ice hockey player
- Victor Veysey (1915–2001), American politician
