= Emberson =

Emberson is a surname. Notable people with the surname include:

- Carl Emberson (born 1973), English footballer
- Ty Emberson (born 2000), American ice hockey player
