= Steve Winter =

Steve or Steven Winter may refer to:

- Steve Winter (game designer), American game designer
- Steve Winter (footballer), English footballer
- Steve Winter (New Hampshire politician), member of the New Hampshire House of Representatives
- Steven Winter (legal scholar), professor of constitutional law at Wayne State University Law School
- Steven Winter (Connecticut politician), member of the Connecticut House of Representatives
- Stephen Winter, American film director
