= Matt Gregg =

Matt Gregg may refer to:

- Matt Gregg (footballer)
- Matt Gregg (politician)
