= Jamie Robinson (footballer) =

English footballer (born 1972)

Personal information
- Full name: Jamie Robinson
- Date of birth: 26 February 1972 (age 54)
- Place of birth: Liverpool, England
- Position: Central defender

Senior career*
Years	Team	Apps	(Gls)
1990–1992	Liverpool	0	(0)
1992–1994	Barnsley	9	(0)
1994–1997	Carlisle United	57	(4)
1997–1999	Torquay United	77	(1)
1999–2000	Exeter City	12	(0)
2000	Chester City	9	(0)
Total		162	(5)
- * Club domestic league appearances and goals

Jamie Robinson (born 26 February 1972) is an English football coach and former professional player who played as a central defender in the Football League for Barnsley, Carlisle United, Torquay United, Exeter City and Chester City. He is now a first-team coach at Nottingham Forest having previously worked at The Football Association as the head of coach development.

== Honours ==
Carlisle United

- Football League Third Division: 1994–95
- Football League Trophy runner-up: 1994–95
