= Paul Abrahams (footballer) =

English footballer (born 1973)

Personal information
- Full name: Paul Abrahams
- Date of birth: 31 October 1973 (age 53)
- Place of birth: Colchester, England
- Height: 1.80 m (5 ft 11 in)
- Positions: Forward; winger

Youth career
- Colchester United

Senior career*
Years	Team	Apps	(Gls)
1991–1995	Colchester United	58	(8)
1994–1996	Brentford	35	(8)
1996	→ Colchester United (loan)	8	(2)
1996–1999	Colchester United	81	(16)
1999–2000	Kettering Town	10	(1)
2000–2001	Canvey Island	24	(3)
2001	Chesham United	1	(1)
2001	Wivenhoe Town	29	(10)
2001–2003	Heybridge Swifts	57	(25)
2001	Hemel Hempstead Town	3	(0)
2003–2004	Wivenhoe Town	25	(11)
2005–2006	AFC Sudbury		
2007–2008	Halstead Town	20	(12)
2009–2010	Halstead Town		
Total		351	(97)

Managerial career
- 2022: Maldon & Tiptree
- * Club domestic league appearances and goals

Paul Abrahams (born 31 October 1973) is an English former footballer who played as a forward or as a winger in the Football League, most notably for Colchester United, where he made over 100 league appearances in two spells between 1992 and 1999. He also played for Brentford and for a number of non-league teams after retiring from the professional game through injury. He was most recently manager of Maldon & Tiptree.

== Playing career ==
Born in Colchester, Abrahams began his career at hometown club Colchester United. He signed professional terms with the U's in summer 1992, having scored 46 goals in 31 youth-team games in the previous season. He had broken into Colchester's non-league double winning side during the 1991–92 season, making his debut as a substitute in a 4–2 win at Slough Town on 26 August 1991. Abrahams made three Conference appearances, all as substitute, and went on to play 55 Football League games for the U's until he joined Brentford for a fee of £30,000 in 1995. He made 35 appearances for Brentford, scoring eight times. He was loaned back to Colchester in late 1995 and re-signed permanently for the U's in 1996 for £20,000. He went on to become a key member of Steve Wignall's team, scoring an important golden goal against Peterborough United to put Colchester into the 1997 Football League Trophy Final, a game which Colchester lost in a penalty shoot-out to Carlisle United. Abrahams was a member of the 1998 Third Division play-off final winning team, although did not play a part in the match itself.

Abrahams was forced into an early retirement from the professional game in 1999 following a knee injury. He had made 144 league appearances in total for the U's.

After leaving Colchester, Abrahams made appearances for a number of non-league teams, including Kettering Town, Canvey Island, Chesham United, Wivenhoe Town, Heybridge Swifts and AFC Sudbury. He scored 14 goals for Sudbury in 56 appearances in total, before having his contract with the club terminated in November 2006 following a series of niggling injuries. He joined Halstead Town for the 2007–08 season, and rejoined the club in November 2009 to help with first team coaching. He made another appearance for Halstead in April 2010. His career ended due to a cruciate ligament injury.

== Managerial career ==
In May 2022 Abrahams was appointed manager of Maldon & Tiptree. In September 2022, Abrahams was sacked by the club having lost every league match and exited both the FA Cup and FA Trophy.

== Personal life ==
After leaving professional football, Abrahams worked for a publishing company. As of May 2011, he was working for consultancy company Fundamental Media.

== Honours ==
Colchester United

- Football League Third Division play-offs: 1998
- Football League Trophy runner-up: 1996–97
