= Andy Gurney =

English footballer (born 1974)

Personal information
- Full name: Andrew Gurney
- Date of birth: 25 January 1974 (age 52)
- Place of birth: Bristol, England
- Height: 5 ft 8 in (1.73 m)
- Positions: Defender; midfielder

Senior career*
Years	Team	Apps	(Gls)
1992–1997	Bristol Rovers	108	(9)
1997–1999	Torquay United	67	(10)
1999–2001	Reading	67	(3)
2001–2004	Swindon Town	132	(22)
2004–2006	Swansea City	28	(1)
2005–2006	→ Swindon Town (loan)	12	(1)
2005–2006	Swindon Town	16	(0)
2006–2007	Clevedon Town	8	(2)
2007	Weston-super-Mare	10	(3)
2007	Havant & Waterlooville	0	(0)
2007–2008	Weston-super-Mare	7	(1)
2008	Newport County	28	(9)
2008–2010	Weston-super-Mare	4	(1)
2010	Mangotsfield United		
2010–2011	Bridgwater Town		

Managerial career
- 2008–2009: Weston-super-Mare (caretaker)
- 2009–2010: Weston-super-Mare
- 2015–: Roman Glass St George
- * Club domestic league appearances and goals

Andrew Gurney (born 25 January 1974) is an English former professional footballer. He played at right-back as well as in the centre of defence, central midfield or as a sweeper. He manages Roman Glass St George.

== Playing career ==
=== Early life and beginnings of career ===
Gurney was born in Bristol, England, and began his career as an apprentice with his hometown club Bristol Rovers, turning professional in July 1992. His league debut came in the 1993–94 season and he went on to make 108 league appearances scoring 9 goals before being released in the summer of 1997. He began training with Cardiff City and was also linked with a move to Cambridge United, but on 8 July 1997 he signed a three-month contract with Torquay United.

His form in the early part of the season urged manager Kevin Hodges to upgrade his contract to a yearly deal, and his partnership with Paul Gibbs led to one of the most effective wing-back partnerships in the Third Division that season as Torquay made the play-offs.

=== Reading & departure ===
Gurney left Plainmoor on 10 January 1999, signing for Reading for a fee of £100,000, having scored 10 times in 64 league games for the Gulls—a better strike rate than many of the forwards to have played for United during the 1990s. He settled in well at the Madejski Stadium and was a regular member of the side until early 2001 when he lost his place. He was transfer listed at his own request in February 2001 and was released in the summer, joining local rivals Swindon Town on 30 June.

=== Swindon and Swansea ===
Gurney was made captain at Swindon, where he clocked up almost 150 games for the Robins. Shortly after the 2004–05 season had started, he surprisingly left the County Ground and joined Swansea City on a free transfer. Swindon's then manager Andy King explained that the club could no longer afford to turn down Swansea's wage offer to Gurney, which was deemed surprising because Gurney had one more year left on his Swindon Town contract. Subsequent rumours began to circulate on the internet that an alleged personal feud with a teammate was the real reason for his departure.

Gurney played just over 30 games for Swansea, getting booked 5 times and sent-off once (for kicking an opponent and was transfer listed in May 2005.

Andy King refuted claims that Gurney was to rejoin Swindon, but in August 2005 Gurney joined on loan. This was later turned into a permanent deal in January 2006. Conveniently, the other player alleged in the personal feud with Gurney had left a short while before his return to Swindon.

=== Retirement and return ===
A few months into the 06–07 season Gurney retired from football due to a recurring ankle injury which had kept him sidelined all season. In December 2006, he came out of retirement to join Clevedon Town, scoring on his debut against Gloucester City.

In February 2007, Gurney left Clevedon to join Weston-super-Mare, but moved again in May 2007, joining Conference South rivals Havant & Waterlooville.

Soon after joining Havant & Waterlooville, Gurney stated he found the travel difficult. Weston-super-Mare manager Tony Ricketts saw an opportunity and approached for Gurney's services multiple times. He was eventually successful in convincing Gurney to join the Seagulls on 22 December 2007 and he was instilled as captain of the side straightaway.

The stay at Weston-super-Mare was short-lived as Gurney signed for fellow Conference South side Newport County on 12 February 2008. However, despite Newport narrowly missing out on the promotion play-offs and winning the 2008 FAW Premier Cup final, Gurney was released by Newport at the end of the 2007–08 season.

== Managerial career ==
In May 2008, Gurney returned to Weston-super-Mare as player-assistant manager. In August 2009, Gurney took over as manager of Weston

After leaving Weston-super-Mare in 2010, Gurney had spells with Mangotsfield United and Bridgwater Town before retiring.

In 2015, Gurney was appointed manager of Roman Glass St George.
