= Lee Brydon =

English footballer

Personal information
- Full name: Lee Brydon
- Date of birth: 15 November 1974 (age 51)
- Place of birth: Stockton-on-Tees, England
- Height: 5 ft 11 in (1.80 m)
- Position: Defender

Senior career*
Years	Team	Apps	(Gls)
1995–1996	Liverpool	0	(0)
1996–1998	Darlington	39	(0)
1998–1999	Bishop Auckland		
1999–2000	Barrow	28	(1)
- * Club domestic league appearances and goals

Lee Brydon (born 15 November 1974) is an English former professional footballer who played as a defender for Darlington in the Football League.
