= Ken Veysey =

English footballer

Personal information
- Date of birth: 8 June 1967 (age 59)
- Place of birth: Hackney, London, England
- Position: Goalkeeper

Youth career
- Tottenham Hotspur
- Arsenal
- Leyton

Senior career*
Years	Team	Apps	(Gls)
–1987	Dawlish Town		
1987–1990	Torquay United	72	(0)
1990–1993	Oxford United	57	(0)
1992–1993	→ Sheffield United (loan)	0	(0)
1993	Reading	0	(0)
1993–1994	Exeter City	12	(0)
1994–1997	Dorchester Town		
1997–1999	Torquay United	37	(0)
1999–2000	Plymouth Argyle	6	(0)
2000	Taunton Town		
- * Club domestic league appearances and goals

Kenneth James Veysey (born 8 June 1967) is an English former professional football goalkeeper. He was born in Hackney, London.

In June 2007, Veysey again became Torquay United's goalkeeping coach.
