= Jon Gittens =

English footballer (1964–2019)

Personal information
- Full name: Jonathan Antoni Gittens
- Date of birth: 22 January 1964
- Place of birth: Moseley, England
- Date of death: 10 May 2019 (aged 55)
- Height: 6 ft 0 in (1.83 m)
- Position: Centre back

Youth career
- Paget Rangers

Senior career*
Years	Team	Apps	(Gls)
1985–1987	Southampton	18	(0)
1987–1991	Swindon Town	126	(6)
1991–1992	Southampton	19	(0)
1992	→ Middlesbrough (loan)	12	(1)
1992–1993	Middlesbrough	13	(0)
1993–1996	Portsmouth	83	(2)
1996–1998	Torquay United	77	(9)
1998–2000	Exeter City	82	(4)
2000–2001	Nuneaton Borough	13	(0)
2001	→ Dorchester Town (loan)		

Managerial career
- 2002–2004: Fareham Town
- 2007–2010: Blackfield & Langley
- * Club domestic league appearances and goals

Jonathan Antoni Gittens (22 January 1964 – 10 May 2019) was an English professional footballer who played for Swindon Town as well as for Southampton, Middlesbrough, Portsmouth, Torquay United and Exeter City.

== Playing career ==
=== Southampton ===
Born in Moseley, Gittens started his career with Midlands Combination side Paget Rangers whilst taking a two-year course in menswear tailoring when he was spotted by Southampton.

Gittens joined the Saints in October 1985 for a fee of £10,000. At the time of his signing he was raw but had pace and was considered one for the future. He made his league debut in a 2–0 victory at Birmingham City on 19 April 1986 and retained his place for the next three games. In the following season he was in and out of the team, making 14 appearances, usually as a replacement for Mark Wright or Kevin Bond.

In July 1987 he became a free agent and, having found it difficult to hold down a regular place in the Southampton side, he moved to Swindon Town for a fee of £40,000. The fee was fixed by tribunal, the first Saints had been involved in as a selling side.

=== Swindon Town ===
Gittens was a strong player in the centre of Swindon's defence, and formed a great partnership with Colin Calderwood. He had a tendency to be rough at times, and was always likely to be booked (but was only sent off twice). His two red cards came in a 4–0 defeat at Leeds United on 23 September 1989 and a year later in a 5–1 defeat at Barnsley.

During his four seasons with Swindon, the club reached the play-offs twice (in 1988–89 and again in 1989–90), but failed to gain promotion to the First Division. Swindon Town won the Second Division playoff final in 1989–90 but Sunderland were promoted instead after the Swindon board admitted a series of financial irregularities.

In March 1991, after 126 games for the Robins, Chris Nicholl re-signed him for Southampton, and he returned to The Dell a day before the transfer deadline, this time for a fee of £400,000.

=== Return to Southampton ===
Although he played in the final eight games of the 1990–91 season, replacing the injured Kevin Moore alongside Neil Ruddock, the following season, under new manager Ian Branfoot, he only made eleven appearances, generally as cover for Richard Hall.

Having again failed to establish himself at The Dell, he joined promotion chasing Middlesbrough on loan in February 1992.

=== Middlesbrough ===
With promotion to the new Premiership duly achieved he made the permanent move to Middlesbrough in July that summer for a fee of £350,000. As Middlesbrough struggled at the foot of the table, Gittens lost his place, and left on a free transfer in August the following year, joining Portsmouth.

=== Portsmouth ===
At Portsmouth, he was a near regular throughout the 1993–94 and 1994–95 seasons but following the sacking of Jim Smith in 1995 his appearances were limited under new manager Terry Fenwick. Gittens was one of two Pompey players sent off in January 1995's 1–0 FA Cup 4th round defeat at Fratton Park against Leicester City. In appalling conditions referee Dermot Gallagher firstly sent off both Gittens and goalkeeper Alan Knight.

The 1995–96 season saw his chances limited to just fifteen appearances, the last of these coming in January 1996 as the club crashed out of the FA Cup 3–0 against Gitten's former club, local rivals Southampton.

=== Torquay United ===
In August 1996, after a total of 99 games for Pompey he joined Torquay United on a free transfer, one of Kevin Hodges' first signings. Despite achieving national attention by allegedly punching West Ham United's Romanian international Florin Răducioiu in a friendly later that month (his first game for the Gulls) he settled in well at Plainmoor in terms of first-team football. However travelling in from Dorchester was causing him problems and on 24 March 1997, after falling out with the management team, he was released on full pay until the end of the season. He returned the following season and finished it as the club's player of the year with an appearance at Wembley in the playoff final defeat at the hands of Colchester United, Gittens giving away a harshly awarded penalty.

=== Exeter City ===
He moved to local rivals Exeter City in July 1998 on a free transfer, having previously been linked with a move to Swansea City as player-coach. He played 82 times for the Grecians, but was released at the end of the 1999–2000 season as part of Noel Blake's mass clearout, joining Conference side Nuneaton Borough on 6 August 2000. He had an unsuccessful time with Nuneaton, joining Dorchester Town on a three-month loan deal in January 2001.

== Coaching and management career ==
Gittens joined the coaching staff at Fareham Town in December 2001 and was appointed as manager in June 2002. Whilst manager at Fareham, he was charged with misconduct for using "foul" language against a referee's assistant on Easter Monday 2004. Gittens was sent to the stands for calling the assistant a "chicken nugget".

Following a disagreement with the club, notably over their decision to scrap the reserve team, Gittens resigned in late July 2004.

After leaving Fareham he Managed and coached the successful Solent University side Team Solent in the Southampton League. In May 2007, he was named as the manager of Wessex League Division 1 team, Blackfield & Langley. They clinched promotion in April 2009 to the Wessex Senior League. His position as manager was terminated in late August 2010.

Gittens was a UEFA "A" licensed coach who worked part-time as Coach Educator whilst studying at Bournemouth University.

== Death and legacy ==
Gittens died on 10 May 2019, at the age of 55. In 2021, the FA announced that his achievements in football and his legacy to FA Education would be recognised with The Jon Gittens Pitch at St Georges's Park in Staffordshire. The 3G pitch will be used for coaching development.

== Career statistics ==
Appearances and goals by club, season and competition
Club	Season	League			FA Cup		League Cup		Other		Total	
Club	Season	Division	Apps	Goals	Apps	Goals	Apps	Goals	Apps	Goals	Apps	Goals
Southampton
Southampton	1985–86	First Division	4	0	0	0	0	0	—		4	0
Southampton	1986–87	First Division	14	0	1	0	4	0	—		19	0
Southampton	Total		18	0	0	0	0	0	0	0	23	0
Swindon Town
Swindon Town	1987–88	Second Division	29	0	3	0	2	0	5 (Note: Appearances in EFL Trophy)	1	39	1
Swindon Town	1988–89	Second Division	29	1	2	0	2	0	2 (Note: Appearances in EFL Trophy (1) and play-offs (1))	0	35	1
Swindon Town	1989–90	Second Division	40	4	1	0	8	0	6 (Note: Appearances in EFL Trophy (3) and play-offs (3))	0	55	4
Swindon Town	1990–91	Second Division	28	1	3	0	4	0	1	0	36	1
Swindon Town	Total		126	6	9	0	16	0	14	1	165	7
Southampton
Southampton	1990–91	First Division	8	0	0	0	0	0	—		8	0
Southampton	1991–92	First Division	11	0	0	0	4	0	1 (Note: Appearances in Full Members' Cup)	0	16	0
Southampton	Total		19	0	0	0	4	0	1	0	23	0
Middlesbrough (loan)	1991–92	Second Division	12	1	0	0	0	0	—		12	1
Middlesbrough	1992–93	Premier League	13	0	1	0	1	0	—		15	0
Middlesbrough	Total		25	1	1	0	1	0	0	0	27	1
Portsmouth
Portsmouth	1993–94	First Division	30	1	0	0	5	0	3 (Note: Appearances in Anglo-Italian Cup)	0	38	1
Portsmouth	1994–95	First Division	38	0	2	0	5	0	—		45	0
Portsmouth	1995–96	First Division	15	1	1	0	0	0	—		16	1
Portsmouth	Total		83	2	3	0	10	0	3	0	99	2
Torquay United
Torquay United	1996–97	Third Division	32	3	1	0	3	0	4	1	41	3
Torquay United	1997–98	Third Division	45	6	3	0	3	0	4 (Note: Appearances in EFL Trophy (1/1) and play-offs (3/1))	2	55	8
Torquay United	Total		77	9	4	0	6	0	8	3	95	12
Exeter City
Exeter City	1998–99	Third Division	44	2	3	1	2	0	2	0	51	3
Exeter City	1999–2000	Third Division	38	2	4	0	1	0	4	0	47	2
Exeter City	Total		82	4	7	1	3	0	6	0	98	5
Nuneaton Borough	2000–01	Conference	13	0	0	0	—		1 (Note: Appearances in Conference League Cup)	0	14	0
Career total			443	22	24	1	40	0	33	4	540	27
