= Jason Rockett =

English footballer

Personal information
- Date of birth: 26 September 1969 (age 57)
- Place of birth: London, England
- Position: Defender

Senior career*
Years	Team	Apps	(Gls)
1992–1993	Rotherham United	0	(0)
1993–1998	Scarborough	194	(15)
- * Club domestic league appearances and goals

Jason Rockett (born 26 September 1969) is an English former footballer who played in the Football League for Scarborough
