= Steve Winter (footballer) =

English footballer

Personal information
- Date of birth: 26 October 1973 (age 53)
- Place of birth: Bristol, England
- Position: Midfielder

Youth career
- Walsall

Senior career*
Years	Team	Apps	(Gls)
1992–1993	Walsall	18	(0)
1994–1995	Taunton Town	0	(0)
1995–1997	Torquay United	72	(6)
1997	Yeovil Town	6	(0)
1997–1999	Forest Green Rovers		(6)
- Dorchester Town
- Forest Green Rovers
	Basingstoke Town	32	(7)
2001–2006	Tiverton Town	102	(265)
2006–2007	Chippenham Town		
2007–2008	Almondsbury Town		
2012	Bishop Sutton		

Managerial career
- 2008–2009: Shirehampton
- 2009–2010: Axa
- 2013: Chippenham Town
- * Club domestic league appearances and goals

Steve Winter (born 26 October 1973) is an English former footballer who played in the Football League for Torquay United and Walsall as a midfielder. He is the former manager of Chippenham Town.

== Career ==
Winter began his professional career with Walsall in the Football League, where after being released he dropped shortly into the non-league game with Taunton Town. He then earned a return to the Football League with Torquay United, where he enjoyed a two-year spell.

Winter then moved to Yeovil Town in August 1997, but his stay was short-lived, and he moved to Dr Martens Premier Division side Forest Green Rovers. He was a part of the Forest Green squad that, under the management of Frank Gregan, earned promotion into the Conference National in the 1997–98 season and appeared at Wembley Stadium for the club in the 1999 FA Trophy final.

He moved to Tiverton Town in August 2001 and in July 2003 was a part of the Tiverton side that defeated his former club, Torquay United, at Plainmoor to win the Devon Bowl. In March 2006, Winter joined league rivals Chippenham Town in a surprise move. He left the club a few months later in May 2006.

In the summer of 2007 he joined then Hellenic League side Almondsbury Town as player/assistant manager. He left the club in the summer of 2008 to become player-manager at Shirehampton where he guided the Somerset club to a second-place finish in his first year in charge before leaving to become boss at Gloucestershire County League side Axa. He left Axa in October 2010.

In March 2012, Winter returned to playing duties with Bishop Sutton. In June 2013, Winter was confirmed as the new assistant manager at Bristol Manor Farm. He left the club just a month later, however, to undertake the role of assistant manager at Southern Premier Division side Chippenham Town. After Nathan Rudge left the club, Winter was appointed full-time boss after a short caretaker spell in charge of the club. He was sacked just a few months later, however, after a 9–0 home defeat against Stourbridge. This was despite the fact he wasn't in attendance at the game as he was on holiday in Egypt and he was sacked over the phone by chairman Neil Blackmore.
