= Neil Gregory =

Zambian-English footballer (born 1972)

Personal information
- Full name: Neil Richard Gregory
- Date of birth: 7 October 1972 (age 54)
- Place of birth: Ndola, Zambia
- Height: 5 ft 11 in (1.80 m)
- Position: Forward

Youth career
- –1992: Ipswich Town

Senior career*
Years	Team	Apps	(Gls)
1992–1998	Ipswich Town	36	(9)
1994	→ Chesterfield (loan)	3	(1)
1995	→ Scunthorpe United (loan)	10	(7)
1996	→ Torquay United (loan)	5	(0)
1997	→ Peterborough United (loan)	3	(1)
1998	→ Colchester United (loan)	10	(5)
1998–2000	Colchester United	44	(7)
1999	→ Boston Bulldogs (loan)		
1999	→ Canvey Island (loan)		
2000–2005	Canvey Island		
2006–2007	Wivenhoe Town		
- * Club domestic league appearances and goals

Neil Richard Gregory (born 7 October 1972) is an English former professional footballer. A striker, he played for several clubs in the Football League.

== Biography ==
Born in Ndola, Zambia, Gregory began his career as an apprentice with Ipswich Town, turning professional in February 1992. His brother David was also a professional footballer. He joined Chesterfield on loan in February 1994, making his league debut for the Spirerites, and joined Scunthorpe United on loan in March 1995, hitting 7 goals in 10 games.

After the success of his loan spell, he returned to Ipswich and began to feature in the first team, though mainly as a substitute (27 of his 45 league appearances for Ipswich Town came this way). In November 1996 he joined Torquay United on loan, but failed to score in 5 games, and in November 1997 moved to Peterborough United on loan.

He joined Colchester United on loan in January 1998, with the move being made permanent on 26 March, Colchester paying a club record fee of £50,000. He was a regular for Colchester during the rest of the season, but was allowed to join the Boston Bulldogs on loan for the summer of 1999.

He joined Canvey Island on loan in December 1999, signing for them on a free transfer on 4 February after scoring 11 times in 53 games for Colchester. In May 2001 he was a member of the Canvey Island side that won the FA Trophy, and was a regular member of the side that won promotion to the Conference. In 2001, he scored the winning goals in FA Cup ties against Wigan Athletic and Northampton Town. At the time of the cup run, Gregory was reported to be a full-time house husband. He signed a new twelve-month contract with Canvey Island in June 2005. After retiring from playing, he worked as assistant manager of Whitton United alongside former Ipswich reserves player Gary Thompson during 2008, before becoming manager of Stowupland Falcons in 2011. Gregory left Stowupland Falcons after 5 years in charge.

== Honours ==
Colchester United

- Football League Third Division play-offs: 1998
