= Mark Sale =

English footballer

Personal information
- Full name: Mark David Sale
- Date of birth: 27 February 1972 (age 54)
- Place of birth: Burton upon Trent, England
- Height: 6 ft 5 in (1.96 m)
- Position: Forward

Youth career
- 1988–1990: Stoke City

Senior career*
Years	Team	Apps	(Gls)
1990–1991	Stoke City	2	(0)
1991–1992	Cambridge United	0	(0)
1992	Rocester		
1992–1993	Birmingham City	21	(0)
1993–1994	Torquay United	44	(8)
1994–1995	Preston North End	13	(7)
1995–1997	Mansfield Town	45	(12)
1997–1999	Colchester United	80	(12)
1999	→ Plymouth Argyle (loan)	8	(1)
1999–2001	Rushden & Diamonds	10	(0)
2001–2002	Doncaster Rovers	14	(3)
2002–2003	Tamworth	13	(2)
2003	→ Hucknall Town (loan)	5	(0)
2003–2005	Alfreton Town	45	(10)
2005–2007	Northwich Victoria	21	(3)
2007	Hednesford Town	0	(0)
Total		321	(58)
- * Club domestic league appearances and goals

Mark David Sale (born 27 February 1972) is an English coach and former professional footballer who played as a forward. He was most recently Assistant Head Coach of Oxford United. He made more than 200 appearances in the Football League and many more in non-league football.

He was first-team coach of Birmingham City from October 2014 to December 2016. In March 2017 he was appointed first-team coach at Derby County. He joined Stoke City as the club's first-team coach in June 2018. On 26 December 2024 Sale was appointed as Gary Rowett's assistant at Oxford, leaving the role just under a year later on 23 December 2025 when Rowett was dismissed following a poor run of results.

== Playing career ==
Sale was born in Burton upon Trent, Staffordshire, and began his career as a trainee with Stoke City. He made his league debut away to Brighton & Hove Albion in May 1990 and played the following week in the home game against Swindon Town.

He was released by Stoke without playing any further first team games and joined non-league Rocester from where he joined Birmingham City in March 1992. He moved to Torquay United for a fee of £10,000 and had a successful forward partnership with Duane Darby. His form at Torquay led to a £20,000 move to Preston North End where he had limited success.

In July 1995 he joined Mansfield Town for a fee of £50,000 and immediately joined his new teammates in a pre-season tour of Cyprus. He was in and out of the side and in March 1997 was sold to Colchester United for a fee of £23,500. His first game for Colchester came in a 2–1 win against Mansfield. Later in the season he played at Wembley in the final of the Football League Trophy.

He left Colchester in July 1999, joining Rushden & Diamonds for a fee of £30,000. He began the season as a regular in the side, but was soon diagnosed with Hodgkin's disease and underwent chemotherapy. He made a full recovery and returned to Rushden's side in December 2000, though was to play only twice as Rushden won the Conference and with it promotion to the Football League.

Sale joined Doncaster Rovers in May 2001, played 15 times in the Conference, and was released at the end of the 2001–02 season. He initially agreed terms with Conference side Forest Green Rovers, but that fell through and he joined Tamworth in August 2002. He had a loan spell with Hucknall Town in September 2003 before moving to Alfreton Town in October 2003. In June 2005 he moved on to join Northwich Victoria, rejoining his former Hucknall manager Steve Burr, and helped Northwich to promotion back to the Conference National. Sale left Northwich in January 2007 to join Hednesford Town, but did not appear for the first team.

In January 2008 he was appointed youth-team manager at Burton Albion, a role which he combined with working as football development officer for East Staffordshire Borough Council. When Burton manager Gary Rowett was appointed manager of Birmingham City in October 2014, Sale accompanied him as first-team coach. Rowett and his staff, Sale included, were sacked in December 2016. On 14 March 2017, he once again linked up with Rowett, this time as first-team coach of Derby County.

Sale followed Rowett to Stoke City in June 2018. He left Stoke on 8 January 2019.

On 26 December 2024 Sale was appointed Assistant Head Coach of Oxford United linking up once again with Gary Rowett.

== Career statistics ==
Appearances and goals by club, season and competition
Club	Season	League			FA Cup		League Cup		Other (Note: The "Other" column includes appearances and goals in the Anglo-Italian Cup, Football League Trophy and Football League play-offs)		Total	
Club	Season	Division	Apps	Goals	Apps	Goals	Apps	Goals	Apps	Goals	Apps	Goals
Stoke City	1989–90	Second Division	2	0	0	0	0	0	0	0	2	0
Stoke City	1990–91	Third Division	0	0	0	0	0	0	0	0	0	0
Cambridge United	1991–92	Second Division	0	0	0	0	0	0	0	0	0	0
Birmingham City	1991–92	Third Division	6	0	0	0	0	0	0	0	6	0
Birmingham City	1992–93	First Division	15	0	0	0	2	1	4	2	21	3
Torquay United	1992–93	Third Division	11	2	0	0	0	0	0	0	11	2
Torquay United	1993–94	Third Division	33	6	2	1	1	0	4	0	40	7
Preston North End	1994–95	Third Division	13	7	1	0	2	0	4	0	20	7
Mansfield Town	1995–96	Third Division	27	7	1	0	2	1	1	0	31	8
Mansfield Town	1996–97	Third Division	18	5	1	0	2	0	0	0	21	5
Colchester United	1996–97	Third Division	10	3	0	0	0	0	3	0	13	3
Colchester United	1997–98	Third Division	39	7	3	1	2	0	4	0	48	7
Colchester United	1998–99	Second Division	31	2	1	0	2	0	1	0	35	2
Plymouth Argyle (loan)	1998–99	Third Division	8	1	0	0	0	0	0	0	8	1
Rushden & Diamonds	1999–2000	Conference National	8	0	0	0	0	0	0	0	8	0
Rushden & Diamonds	2000–01	Conference National	2	0	0	0	0	0	0	0	2	0
Doncaster Rovers	2001–02	Conference National	14	3	1	0	0	0	0	0	15	3
Northwich Victoria	2006–07	Conference National	21	3	1	0	0	0	0	0	22	3
Career total			258	46	11	2	13	2	21	2	303	52

== Honours ==
Colchester United

- Football League Third Division play-offs: 1998
- Football League Trophy runner-up: 1996–97

Northwich Victoria

- Conference North: 2005–06
