= Richard Wilkins (footballer) =

English footballer and manager

Personal information
- Full name: Richard John Wilkins
- Date of birth: 28 May 1965 (age 61)
- Place of birth: Lambeth, England
- Height: 6 ft 0 in (1.83 m)
- Position: Midfielder

Senior career*
Years	Team	Apps	(Gls)
1985–1986	Haverhill Rovers		
1986–1990	Colchester United	152	(22)
1990–1994	Cambridge United	81	(7)
1994–1996	Hereford United	77	(5)
1996–2000	Colchester United	127	(11)
Total		437	(45)

Managerial career
- 2000–2014: Bury Town
- 2014–2016: Leiston
- 2017–2020: Needham Market
- 2023: Stowmarket Town
- * Club domestic league appearances and goals

Richard John Wilkins (born 28 May 1965) is an English former professional footballer who played as a midfielder.

== Career ==
Born in Lambeth in London, Wilkins began his career at non-League club Haverhill Rovers in 1985. On 20 November 1986 he signed for Colchester United. After 150 appearances, he was signed by Cambridge United in July 1990 for £60,000. In 1994, he moved to Hereford United on a free transfer, before being re-signed by Colchester in 1996 for a fee of £30,000. He retired from professional football in 2000 before becoming manager of non-League club Bury Town. He led the club to two promotions, in 2005–06 from the Eastern Counties League, and in 2009–10 from the Southern Football League Division One Midlands. Wilkins stepped down from the role at the end of the 2013–14 season. In July 2014, Wilkins joined fellow Suffolk side Leiston as Steve Ball's assistant. He then took over as manager shortly after and led the side to the top half of the Isthmian League Premier Division in his first season. In his second season the side were challenging for promotion. He then left the club by mutual consent before joining Needham Market as the assistant manager. He became manager of Needham Market at the end of the 2016–17 season, remaining at the club until February 2020.

He was appointed assistant manager of Stowmarket Town in April 2021. At the end of the 2022–23 season, he became the club's manager. He resigned in December 2023 after the club's budget was cut.

== Honours ==
Cambridge United

- Football League Third Division: 1990–91

Colchester United

- Football League Third Division play-offs: 1998
- Football League Trophy runner-up: 1996–97

Individual

- Colchester United Player of the Year: 1998
