= 1998 Football League play-offs =

Football League play-offs
- Season: 1997–98
- Champions: Charlton Athletic (First Division); Grimsby Town (Second Division); Colchester United (Third Division)
- Matches: 15
- Goals: 41 (2.73 per match)
- Biggest home win: Torquay 4–1 Scarborough (Third Division)
- Biggest away win: Scarborough 1–3 Torquay (Third Division)
- Highest scoring: Charlton 4–4 Sunderland (8 goals)
- Highest attendance: 77,739 – Charlton v Sunderland (First Division final)
- Lowest attendance: 3,858 – Barnet v Colchester (Third Division semi-final)
- Average attendance: 21,402

The Football League play-offs for the 1997–98 season were held in May 1998, with the finals taking place at the old Wembley Stadium in London. The play-off semi-finals were played over two legs and were contested by the teams who finish in 3rd, 4th, 5th and 6th place in the Football League First Division and Football League Second Division and the 4th, 5th, 6th and 7th placed teams in the Football League Third Division table. The winners of the semi-finals will go through to the finals, with the winner of the matches gaining promotion for the following season.

== Background ==
The Football League play-offs have been held every year since 1987. They take place for each division following the conclusion of the regular season and are contested by the four clubs finishing below the automatic promotion places.

In the First Division, Sunderland, who are aiming to return to the top flight after relegation last season, finished 1 point behind second placed Middlesbrough, who in turn finished 3 points behind champions Nottingham Forest, who returned to the top flight after being relegated last season. Charlton Athletic, who are aiming to return to the top flight after 8 years outside the top division, finished in fourth place in the table. Ipswich Town, who are aiming to return to the top flight after 3 seasons outside the top division, finished in fifth place. Sheffield United, who are aiming to return to the top flight after a 4-year absence, finished 9 points behind Ipswich Town in sixth place. This means Sunderland and Sheffield United will play each other with Ipswich and Charlton playing each other just like in the 1987 playoffs only then Charlton were the First Division and Ipswich were in the Second Division.

== First Division ==
Pos	Team	Pld	W	D	L	GF	GA	GD	Pts
3	Sunderland	46	26	12	8	86	50	+36	90
4	Charlton Athletic	46	26	10	10	80	49	+31	88
5	Ipswich Town	46	23	14	9	77	43	+34	83
6	Sheffield United	46	19	17	10	69	54	+15	74

=== Semi-finals ===
First leg

10 May 1998
13:00

Ipswich Town	0–1	Charlton Athletic
	Report	Clapham 12' (o.g.)

Portman Road, Ipswich
Attendance: 21,681
Referee: Mick Fletcher

10 May 1998
13:00

Sheffield United	2–1	Sunderland
Marcelo 57'; Borbokis 76'	Report	Ball 17'

Bramall Lane, Sheffield
Attendance: 23,800
Referee: Clive Wilkes

Second leg

13 May 1998
19:45

Charlton Athletic	1–0	Ipswich Town
Newton 36'

The Valley, London
Attendance: 15,585
Referee: Eddie Wolstenholme

Charlton Athletic won 2–0 on aggregate.

13 May 1998
19:45

Sunderland	2–0	Sheffield United
Marker 21' (o.g.); Phillips 38'

Stadium of Light, Sunderland
Attendance: 40,092
Referee: Mick Pierce

Sunderland won 3–2 on aggregate.

=== Final ===
25 May 1998
15:00

Charlton Athletic	4–4 (a.e.t.)	Sunderland
Mendonca 23', 71', 103'; Rufus 85'	Report	Quinn 50', 73'; Phillips 58'; Summerbee 99'
Penalties
Mendonca (penalty scored); Brown (penalty scored); Jones (penalty scored); Kinsella (penalty scored); Bowen (penalty scored); Robinson (penalty scored); Newton (penalty scored)	7–6	(penalty scored) Summerbee; (penalty scored) Johnston; (penalty scored) Ball; (penalty scored) Makin; (penalty scored) Rae; (penalty scored) Quinn; (penalty missed) Gray

Wembley Stadium, London
Attendance: 77,739
Referee: Eddie Wolstenholme

== Second Division ==
Pos	Team	Pld	W	D	L	GF	GA	GD	Pts
3	Grimsby Town	46	19	15	12	55	37	+18	72
4	Northampton Town	46	18	17	11	52	37	+15	71
5	Bristol Rovers	46	20	10	16	70	64	+6	70
6	Fulham	46	20	10	16	60	43	+17	70

=== Semi-finals ===
First leg

9 May 1998
15:00

Fulham	1–1	Grimsby Town
Beardsley 45' (pen.)		Smith 53'

Craven Cottage, London
Attendance: 13,954
Referee: Terry Heilbron

10 May 1998
15:00

Bristol Rovers	3–1	Northampton Town
Beadle 30' (pen.); Bennett 37'; Hayles 46'		Gayle 74'

Memorial Ground, Bristol
Attendance: 9,173
Referee: Rob Harris

Second leg

13 May 1998
19:45

Grimsby Town	1–0	Fulham
Donovan 81'

Blundell Park, Cleethorpes
Attendance: 8,689
Referee: Clive Wilkes

Grimsby Town won 2–1 on aggregate.

13 May 1998
19:45

Northampton Town	3–0	Bristol Rovers
Heggs 34'; Clarkson 61'; Warburton 77'

Sixfields Stadium, Northampton
Attendance: 7,501
Referee: Mick Fletcher

Northampton Town won 4–3 on aggregate.

=== Final ===
24 May 1998
15:00

Grimsby Town	1–0	Northampton Town
Donovan 19'

Wembley Stadium, London
Attendance: 62,988
Referee: Terry Heilbron

== Third Division ==
Pos	Team	Pld	W	D	L	GF	GA	GD	Pts
4	Colchester United	46	21	11	14	72	60	+12	74
5	Torquay United	46	21	11	14	68	59	+9	74
6	Scarborough	46	19	15	12	67	58	+9	72
7	Barnet	46	19	13	14	61	51	+10	70

=== Semi-finals ===
First leg

10 May 1998
13:30

Barnet	1–0	Colchester United
Heald 48'

Underhill, London
Attendance: 3,858
Referee: Eddie Wolstenholme

10 May 1998
15:00

Scarborough	1–3	Torquay United
Rockett 40'		Jack 22'; Gittens 50'; McFarlane 72'

McCain Stadium, Scarborough
Attendance: 5,246
Referee: Mike Pierce

Second leg

13 May 1998
19:45

Colchester United	3–1 (a.e.t.)	Barnet
Gregory 12' (pen.), 95'; Greene 65'		Goodhind 41'

Layer Road, Colchester
Attendance: 5,863
Referee: Terry Heilbron

Colchester United won 3–2 on aggregate.

13 May 1998
19:45

Torquay United	4–1	Scarborough
Jack 6', 7'; McCall 38'; Gibbs 55'		Rockett 22'

Plainmoor, Torquay
Attendance: 5,386
Referee: Rob Harris

Torquay United won 7–2 on aggregate.

=== Final ===
22 May 1998
19:30

Colchester United	1–0	Torquay United
Gregory 22' (pen.)

Wembley Stadium, London
Attendance: 19,486
Referee: Mick Fletcher
