= Carl Emberson =

English footballer and coach

Personal information
- Full name: Carl Wayne Emberson
- Date of birth: 13 July 1973 (age 53)
- Place of birth: Epsom, England
- Height: 6 ft 2 in (1.88 m)
- Position: Goalkeeper

Youth career
- Millwall

Senior career*
Years	Team	Apps	(Gls)
1991–1994	Millwall	1	(0)
1992–1993	→ Colchester United (loan)	13	(0)
1994–1999	Colchester United	213	(0)
1999–2001	Walsall	12	(0)
2001–2003	Luton Town	60	(0)
2003–2004	Southend United	7	(0)
2004–2005	Grays Athletic	17	(0)
2005–2006	Sutton United	16	(0)
Total		339	(0)
- * Club domestic league appearances and goals

Carl Wayne Emberson (born 13 July 1973 in Epsom, Surrey) is an English retired football goalkeeper.

== Career ==
He played in the 1990–91 Final of the FA Youth Cup with Millwall, but only ever managed to make 1 Senior first-team appearance under Mick McCarthy for the club, getting sent off against Crystal Palace. He joined Colchester United for £25,000 in 1994, where he had previously been on loan. He enjoyed six successful seasons at Colchester United as their first choice goalkeeper making over 200 senior league and cup Appearances, culminating in winning promotion via the play offs in a 1-0 MOTM appearance at Wembley. He went on to play for Walsall, before moving to Luton Town where he gained automatic promotion in his first season with the club, he then moved onto Southend United, Grays Athletic and Sutton United.

After retiring, Emberson moved to Spain, where he runs a soccer school.

It was announced on 27 June 2011, that Emberson was appointed goalkeeping coach at Bristol Rovers.

He was appointed First Team Development Coach at Luton Town on 3 July 2012. Emberson left the club in March 2013.

== Honours ==
Millwall

- FA Youth Cup: 1991

Colchester United

- Football League Third Division play-offs: 1998
- Football League Trophy runner-up: 1996–97

Walsall

- Football League Second Division play-offs: 2001

Luton Town

- Football League Third Division second-place promotion: 2001–02

Southend United

- Football League Trophy runner-up: 2003–04

Grays Athletic

- FA Trophy: 2004–05
