= Scott Stamps =

English footballer

Personal information
- Date of birth: 20 March 1975 (age 51)
- Place of birth: Edgbaston, England
- Position: Defender

Youth career
- Aston Villa

Senior career*
Years	Team	Apps	(Gls)
1993–1997	Torquay United	86	(5)
1997–1999	Colchester United	57	(1)
1999–2004	Kidderminster Harriers	95	(0)
2004–2006	Tamworth	60	(0)
2006–2007	Bromsgrove Rovers		
2007–2008	Willenhall Town	21	(0)
2008–2009	Hednesford Town		
2009–????	Sutton Coldfield Town	1	(0)
- * Club domestic league appearances and goals

Scott Stamps (born 20 March 1975) is an English footballer who played as a defender for clubs including Torquay United, Colchester United and Kidderminster Harriers.

== Career ==
After progressing through the age groups at Bearwood Sports, Stamps started his professional football career with Torquay United in 1993 as a trainee. During his time with The Gulls, he made 86 appearances and scored 5 goals. On 26 March 1997, he joined Colchester United for £10,000. Stamps was with The U's for just under two seasons and made 57 appearances for the club, but only managed to find the back of the net once. In July 2001 he joined Kidderminster Harriers after a brief spell out of the game. Stamps appeared for Harriers 95 times but never managed to find the net.

Stamps was on the move again in August 2004 and joined Conference National side Tamworth. Stamps spent two seasons with The Lambs before he was released in the summer of 2006. He subsequently played for Bromsgrove Rovers, Willenhall Town and Hednesford Town.
