= Warren Goodhind =

South African soccer player

Personal information
- Date of birth: 16 August 1977 (age 49)
- Place of birth: Johannesburg, South Africa
- Position: Right back

Senior career*
Years	Team	Apps	(Gls)
1996–2001	Barnet	93	(3)
2001–2005	Cambridge United	103	(0)
2005–2007	Rochdale	10	(0)
2006	→ Oxford United (loan)	6	(0)
2007	Ebbsfleet United	8	(0)
2008	Harrow Borough	0	(0)
2008–2011	Eastleigh	118	(0)
2011	Hemel Hempstead Town		
2011–2012	Thurrock	14	(0)
- * Club domestic league appearances and goals as of 25 May 2012 (UTC)

Warren Goodhind (born 16 August 1977) is a South African soccer coach and former professional player.

He played as a right back. Goodhind made more than 200 appearances in the Football League for four clubs between 1996 and 2007. He ended his playing career in non league football and finished playing in 2012.

== Playing career ==
Born in Johannesburg, Goodhind began his career with Barnet. He also played in the Football League for Cambridge United, Rochdale and Oxford United, before playing non-League football with a number of clubs including Ebbsfleet United and Harrow Borough, before spending three years with Eastleigh. Goodhind left Eastleigh in 2011, and after a spell with Hemel Hempstead Town, signed for Thurrock in December 2011.

== Coaching ==
From 2018 to 2022 he was assistant manager at Southall.

== Honours ==
Cambridge United

- Football League Trophy runner-up: 2001–02
