= David Greene (footballer) =

Irish retired footballer (born 1973)

Personal information
- Full name: David Michael Greene
- Date of birth: 26 October 1973 (age 53)
- Place of birth: Luton, England
- Height: 6 ft 2 in (1.88 m)
- Position: Defender

Senior career*
Years	Team	Apps	(Gls)
1991–1996	Luton Town	19	(0)
1992	→ Woking (loan)		
1993–1993	→ Slough Town (loan)	2	(0)
1994	→ Dagenham & Redbridge (loan)		
1994	→ Woking (loan)		
1995	→ Colchester United (loan)	14	(1)
1996	→ Brentford (loan)	11	(0)
1996	→ Dagenham & Redbridge (loan)		
1996–2000	Colchester United	154	(15)
2000–2001	Cardiff City	10	(0)
2001	Cambridge United	1	(0)
Total		209	(16)

International career
1992–1995	Republic of Ireland U21	14	(0)
- * Club domestic league appearances and goals

David Michael Greene (born 26 October 1973) is an Irish former footballer who played as a defender.

== Career ==
Born in Luton, England to a Galway mother and a Dublin father, Greene played for the Republic of Ireland U21 side 14 times. He began his career at hometown club Luton Town, where he spent five years, making just 19 league appearances. Then manager David Pleat's move from Kenilworth Road to take over at Sheffield Wednesday brought Greene into immediate conflict with the new Luton manager, Terry Westley. Greene was loaned out twice during his time with Luton, firstly to Colchester United and then to Brentford. He was sold to Colchester for £30,000 in 1996, and went on to make over 150 league appearances, being named Player of the Year in two consecutive years. Greene moved on to play for Cardiff City in 2000, making 10 league appearances, and made a solitary league appearance for Cambridge United in 2001 before retiring through injury.

== Honours ==
Colchester United

- Football League Third Division play-offs: 1998
- Football League Trophy runner-up: 1996–97

Individual

- Colchester United Player of the Year: 1999, 2000
