= Steve Forbes (footballer) =

English footballer

Personal information
- Full name: Steven Dudley Forbes
- Date of birth: 24 December 1975 (age 50)
- Place of birth: Stoke Newington, London, England
- Position: Midfielder

Senior career*
| Years | Team | Apps | (Gls) |
| 1993–1994 | Sittingbourne | 57 | (11) |
| 1994–1997 | Millwall | 5 | (0) |
| 1997–2000 | Colchester United | 56 | (4) |
| 1999 | → Peterborough United (loan) | 3 | (0) |
| 2000 | Stevenage Borough | 6 | (1) |
| 2000–2002 | Dagenham & Redbridge | 15 | (0) |
| 2002–2003 | Hendon | 112 | (13) |
| 2003–2005 | Billericay Town | 41 | (5) |
| 2005–2007 | Eastleigh | 54 | (11) |
- * Club domestic league appearances and goals

Steven Dudley Forbes (born 24 December 1975) is an English former professional footballer who played as a midfielder.

== Career ==
Born in Stoke Newington, London, Forbes played for Football League clubs including Millwall, Colchester United and Peterborough United. He made just under 100 Football League appearances.

Forbes began his career at Sittingbourne, before being purchased by Millwall for £50,000. He made five league substitute appearances during his time with Millwall, before signing for Colchester United. He had his best spell whilst with the U's, helping them secure promotion via the 1997–98 Division Three playoffs and scoring four goals in 56 league appearances, 36 of which were starts. He went out on loan during the 1998–99 season to Peterborough, where he made three appearances before returning to Colchester. He was signed by Stevenage Borough in April 2000 after being released, and later signed for Dagenham & Redbridge in the summer of 2000. He subsequently joined Hendon and also made appearances for Billericay Town. He was last seen playing for Eastleigh in 2007.

== Honours ==
Colchester United

- Football League Third Division play-offs: 1998
