= Rodney Jack =

Vincentian footballer (born 1972)

Personal information
- Full name: Rodney Alphonso Jack
- Date of birth: 28 September 1972 (age 54)
- Place of birth: Kingstown, Saint Vincent and the Grenadines
- Height: 5 ft 7 in (1.70 m)
- Position: Striker

Senior career*
Years	Team	Apps	(Gls)
1992–1994	Hairoun Lions		
1995	Lambada		
1995–1998	Torquay United	93	(27)
1998–2003	Crewe Alexandra	163	(33)
2003–2004	Rushden & Diamonds	45	(12)
2004–2005	Oldham Athletic	10	(2)
2005–2006	Waterford United	10	(1)
2006–2007	Crewe Alexandra	30	(1)
2008	Southport	5	(0)
2008–2012	Nantwich Town		

International career
1992–2004	Saint Vincent and the Grenadines	45	(23)
- * Club domestic league appearances and goals

Rodney Jack (born 18 September 1972) is a former professional footballer from Saint Vincent and the Grenadines. He is best known for his spells with Torquay United and Crewe Alexandra. He has also played internationally for Saint Vincent and the Grenadines national football team.

== Career ==
Jack was born in Kingstown, Saint Vincent and the Grenadines. He was spotted by Torquay United manager Don O'Riordan when playing for Lambada, a Caribbean select side. O'Riordan signed him for the Gulls on 10 October 1995. He joined Newcastle United on trial in September 1996, Kevin Keegan offering £250,000 for him, but the deal fell through due to problems with his work permit. With the attention being placed on him from higher levels it was inevitable that Jack would move on at some point, and on 17 July 1998 he moved to Crewe Alexandra for a club record fee of £650,000. He had played 110 times, scoring 30 goals for Torquay.

He immediately settled into the Crewe side, scoring nine goals in his first season, but injuries and international call-ups hampered his progress. He played 188 times and scored 42 goals for Crewe before signing for Rushden & Diamonds in 2003 playing 49 games and scoring 13 goals before following manager Brian Talbot to Oldham Athletic in 2004.

His time with Oldham was blighted by injuries and the club released him in 2005. He spent the summer on trial at newly relegated Division Two side Wrexham but failed to win a contract at the club and signed for Irish side Waterford United. In the summer of 2006 he rejoined Crewe Alexandra on a one-year contract, at the end of which he was released on a free transfer. In July 2007, he trialed for Conference North side Southport, playing in a friendly against Tranmere Rovers, in which he set up the only goal of the game.

He was offered a contract by Southport manager, Peter Davenport, before returning to his home country to deal with "family commitments". On returning to England he trained with Southport and joined full-time until the end of the season. His experience shone through in the 5–1 thrashing of fellow promotion chasers AFC Telford United. He left Southport towards the end of the season, and joined Nantwich Town. He won the club's Player of the Year award for the 2010–11 season. He left Nantwich at the end of the 2011/12 season.

== Honours ==
Individual

- PFA Team of the Year: 1997–98 Third Division
