= David Gregory (footballer, born 1970) =

English footballer

Personal information
- Full name: David Spencer Gregory
- Date of birth: 23 January 1970 (age 56)
- Place of birth: Polstead, England
- Height: 5 ft 11 in (1.80 m)
- Position: Midfielder

Senior career*
Years	Team	Apps	(Gls)
1987–1995	Ipswich Town	32	(2)
1995	→ Hereford United (loan)	2	(0)
1995	Peterborough United	3	(0)
1995–2002	Colchester United	226	(19)
2002–2003	Canvey Island	13	(2)
2003–2005	Wivenhoe Town	57	(10)
Total		276	(23)
- * Club domestic league appearances and goals

David Spencer Gregory (born 23 January 1970) is an English retired professional footballer who played as a midfielder. He played alongside his brother Neil whilst at Colchester United and Canvey Island.

== Career ==
Born in Polstead, Gregory began his career at Ipswich Town, making 32 appearances between 1987 and 1995. He made two appearances on loan at Hereford United and three appearances at Peterborough United after leaving Ipswich. He joined Colchester United in 1995 and spent seven years at Layer Road, making 226 league appearances and scoring 19 goals. Gregory helped the U's to their first league promotion for 22 years in 1998 when he stepped up to put Colchester ahead from the spot in the Third Division playoff final. Gregory made history along with Neil as the first pair of brothers in a play-off final in the same match. His brother Neil joined the U's in 1998 and played alongside David until 2000. Gregory featured regularly in the first team until he cracked a bone in his foot playing against Port Vale in March 2002 and failed to recover fitness by the summer break. He again teamed up with his brother Neil at Canvey Island in July 2002.

After he retired from playing, David joined the Colchester United media department as a Communications and PR Officer and, in April 2013, he was inducted into the club's Hall of Fame having scored the winning penalty in the 1998 Wembley play-off final.

== Honours ==
Colchester United

- Football League Third Division play-offs: 1998
- Football League Trophy runner-up: 1996–97
