= Paul Gibbs (footballer) =

English footballer

Personal information
- Full name: Paul Derek Gibbs
- Date of birth: 26 October 1972 (age 54)
- Place of birth: Gorleston, England
- Height: 5 ft 11 in (1.80 m)
- Position: Full-back

Youth career
- Norwich City

Senior career*
Years	Team	Apps	(Gls)
1994	Diss Town		
1994	Fram Larvik		
1995–1997	Colchester United	52	(3)
1997–1998	Torquay United	47	(9)
1998–2000	Plymouth Argyle	34	(3)
2000–2002	Brentford	54	(3)
2002–2003	Barnsley	33	(1)
2003–2004	Gravesend & Northfleet	2	(0)
2004	Canvey Island	3	(0)
2004–2005	Weymouth	13	(0)
2005	Gorleston	5	(0)
Total		243	(19)
- * Club domestic league appearances and goals

Paul Derek Gibbs (born 26 October 1972) is an English former professional footballer.

== Career ==
Gibbs, a left back, began his career at Norwich City as a youngster, followed by an apprenticeship at Scunthorpe United. On not making the grade as a pro, he drifted into local football, playing for Gorleston and later scoring the winner from the penalty spot in the 1994 FA Vase Final at Wembley for Diss Town against Taunton Town. He later played in Norway.

A few days after the 1994 FA Vase Final, Gibbs flew to Norway and joined IF Fram Larvik. The transfer was bankrolled by a supporter group. Gibbs had featured in a friendly match in April 1994, while Fram attended a training camp in Norwich. He made his league debut against Holter in May. He was allowed to return to England in September 1994 in order to trial with several clubs. According to reports, Gibbs would play for Ipswich Town in John Wark's testimonial match before a string of other clubs. Gibbs had brief trial spell at Luton Town, before joining Colchester United on 6 March 1995.

After 53 league games, in which he scored three goals, and only shortly after appearing at Wembley for a second time in the Auto-Windscreens Trophy final defeat at the hands of Carlisle United, he was given a free transfer, joining Torquay United on 26 July 1997. His Torquay debut came on the first day of the 1997–98 season, a 2–1 defeat away to newly promoted Conference champions Macclesfield Town. That season saw Gibbs score seven goals in 41 league games en route to the Division Three play-offs and ultimately defeat in the final at Wembley against Colchester. In just that one season his wing-back partnership with Andy Gurney resulted in 16 goals between the two of them. Gibbs followed departing Torquay manager Kevin Hodges to Plymouth Argyle on 26 July 1998 thanks to the Bosman ruling, though his then girlfriend Helen Chamberlain of Sky Sports' Soccer AM fame refused to follow suit and stayed loyal to the Gulls. His Plymouth career started successfully enough, being named in the Division Three team for the 1998–99 season. However, on the final day of the season, Gibbs suffered a broken leg, putting paid to a planned move to Brentford. Incidentally, the same game in which he broke his leg was the famous Jimmy Glass game against Carlisle, in which the goalkeeper scored in the 94th minute to keep Carlisle United in the Football League.

Gibbs began playing again for Plymouth's reserves in March 2000. On 9 May 2000, Gibbs was given a free transfer by Plymouth, and on 18 May he signed for Brentford on a three-year contract. However, Brentford's financial situation in March 2002 saw Gibbs transfer listed.

On 15 March 2002, Gibbs joined Barnsley on a free transfer. He struggled with injury and in May 2003 underwent a groin operation. On 16 October 2003, Gibbs' contract with Barnsley was terminated. He was linked with Watford, Bradford City and Brentford. The latter of these he trained with during November 2003 and played for their reserves against Aldershot Town. He joined Gravesend & Northfleet later that month, leaving in January 2004.

At the end of March 2004, Gibbs joined Canvey Island until the end of the season. On 17 July 2004, Gibbs joined Steve Claridge's Weymouth on a one-year deal, but in January 2005 returned to Gorleston, later assisting with the coaching at the club.

== Personal life ==
After retiring from football, Gibbs set up P&S Personnel Services, a recruitment agency based in Great Yarmouth, and went on to have a family of

2 amazing boys, will and dylan hayden-gibbs

Paul now represents England over 50's .

== Honours ==
Diss Town

- FA Vase: 1993–94

Colchester United

- Football League Trophy runner-up: 1996–97

Brentford

- Football League Trophy runner-up: 2000–01

Individual

- PFA Team of the Year: 1998–99 Third Division
