= Underhill Stadium =

Demolished stadium in London, England

Coordinates: 51°38′46.17″N 0°11′30.24″W

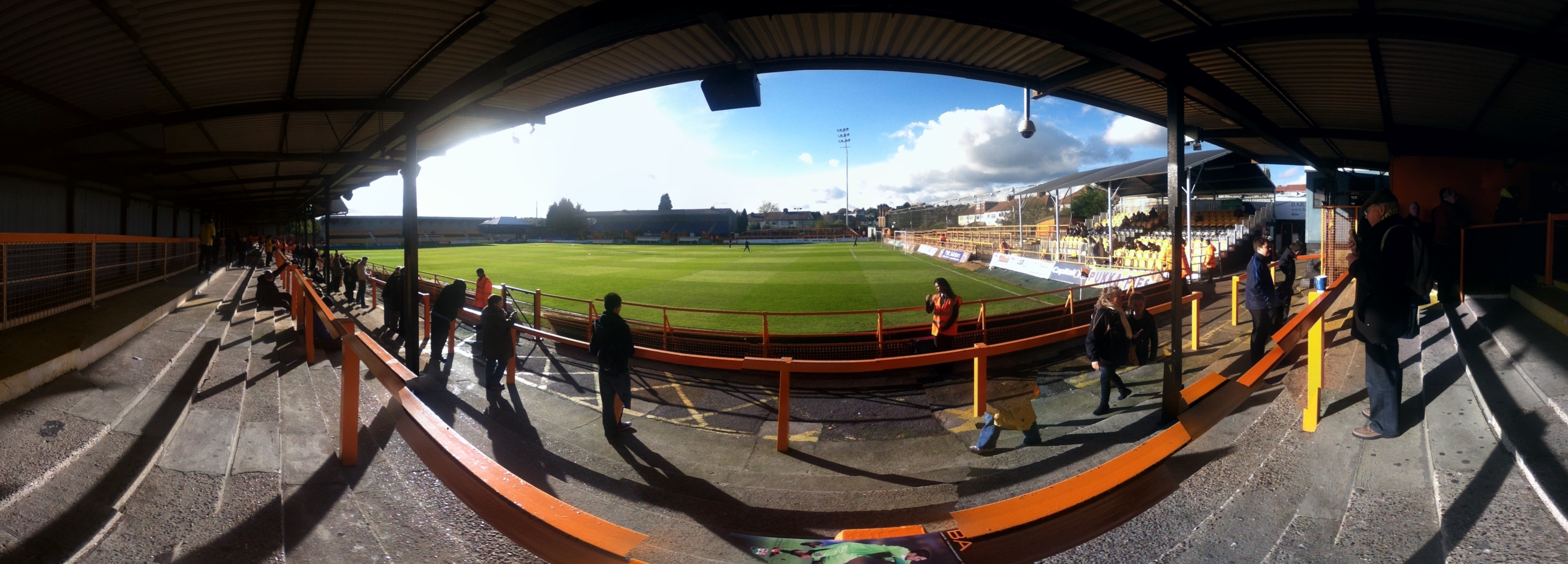
- Interactive map of Underhill Stadium
- Full name: Underhill Stadium
- Location: Westcombe Drive; Barnet; Hertfordshire; EN5 2DN
- Owner: London Borough of Barnet (1907-2002); Barnet F.C. (2002–2015); Education Funding Agency (2015–2018)
- Capacity: 6,023
- Field size: 115 x 75 yards

Construction
- Built: 1907
- Opened: 1907
- Demolished: 2018

Tenants
- Barnet F.C. (1907–2013); Arsenal Reserves (2010–2012); London Broncos (training) (2014); London Broncos U19s (2014); Edgware Town F.C. (2014)

Underhill Stadium was a stadium in Chipping Barnet, London, that was the home of Barnet Football Club between 1907 and 2013. The club's under-19 team played fixtures there; it was also the training ground of the London Broncos rugby league club, and hosted Arsenal reserve games until 2012. At the time of its closure, the stadium had a capacity of 6,023; it was demolished in 2018, and is now the site of the Ark Pioneer Academy, which opened in 2019. The stadium was famous for its slope from the north to south end.

Barnet played their final game at the stadium on 20 April 2013 with a 1–0 win over Wycombe Wanderers, with Jake Hyde scoring the winner in the 81st minute, and Graham Stack saving a 94th-minute penalty to secure the victory in front of a sell-out crowd of 6,001. Barnet moved out of the ground and started their 2013–14 season campaign at The Hive Stadium in Edgware. Demolition of Underhill began in January 2018.

== History ==
The ground was opened in September 1907 with a match against Crystal Palace which the home side won 1–0. At the time, there were a number of amateur clubs playing in Barnet. When opened, the ground was home to Barnet Alston. Alston merged with Avenue FC (who were known as Barnet FC) in 1912 to become Barnet & Alston FC. After the First World War, the club reverted to the name Barnet FC, which continues today.

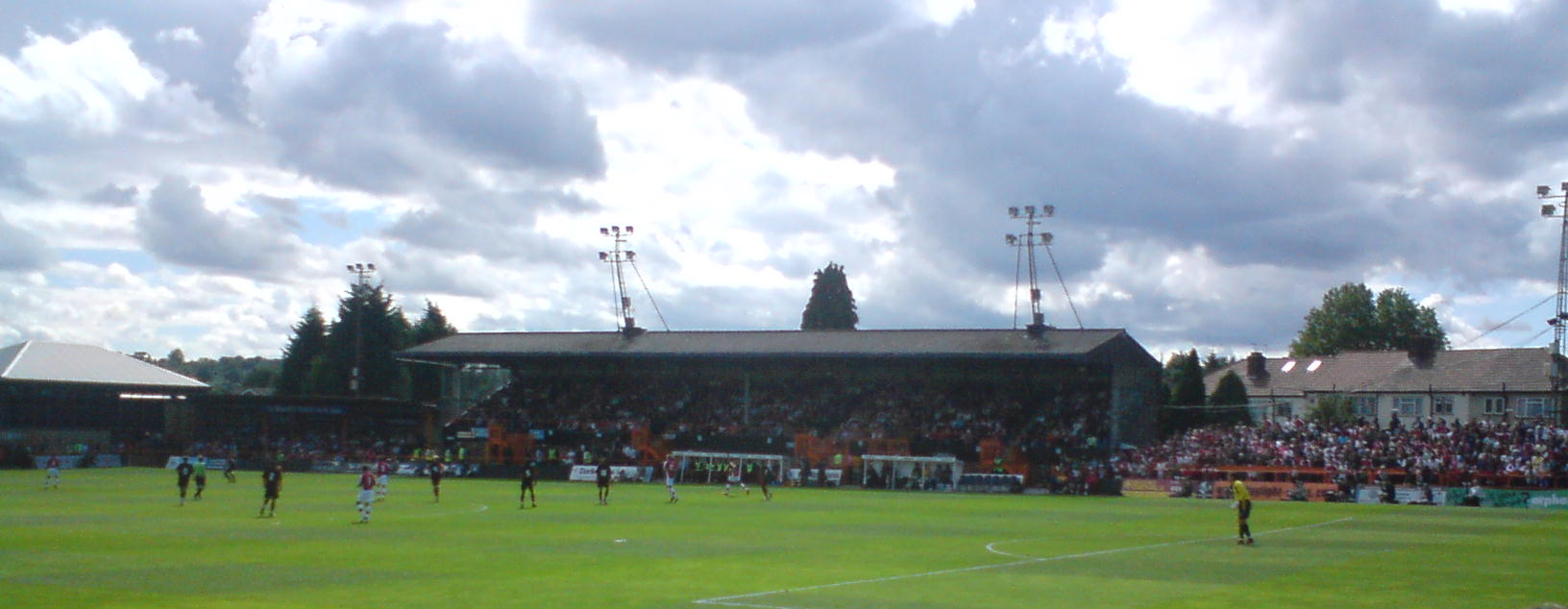
Barnet vs. Arsenal playing at the Underhill Stadium

Barnet F.C. had a 99 year lease on Underhill Stadium dated December 1985. In 2002, Barnet Council sold Underhill Stadium to Barnet F.C. for £10,000.

To celebrate the 100th year of football at the stadium, the two sides met again in the 2007–08 Pre-season. Palace won this match 3–2.

Since the beginning of the 2013–14 season Barnet have played their home games at The Hive Stadium.

In 2014, the Super League rugby league team London Broncos trained at Underhill and their gym and offices were based there. Their Under-19s side also played matches at the stadium.

Edgware Town played their opening games of the 2014–15 Spartan South Midlands League season at Underhill, while their Silver Jubilee Park ground was refurbished.

In June 2015 the site was sold to the Education Funding Agency for £14m. Demolition work began in January 2018 to facilitate the building of the Ark Pioneer Academy, which opened in September 2019.

== Development ==
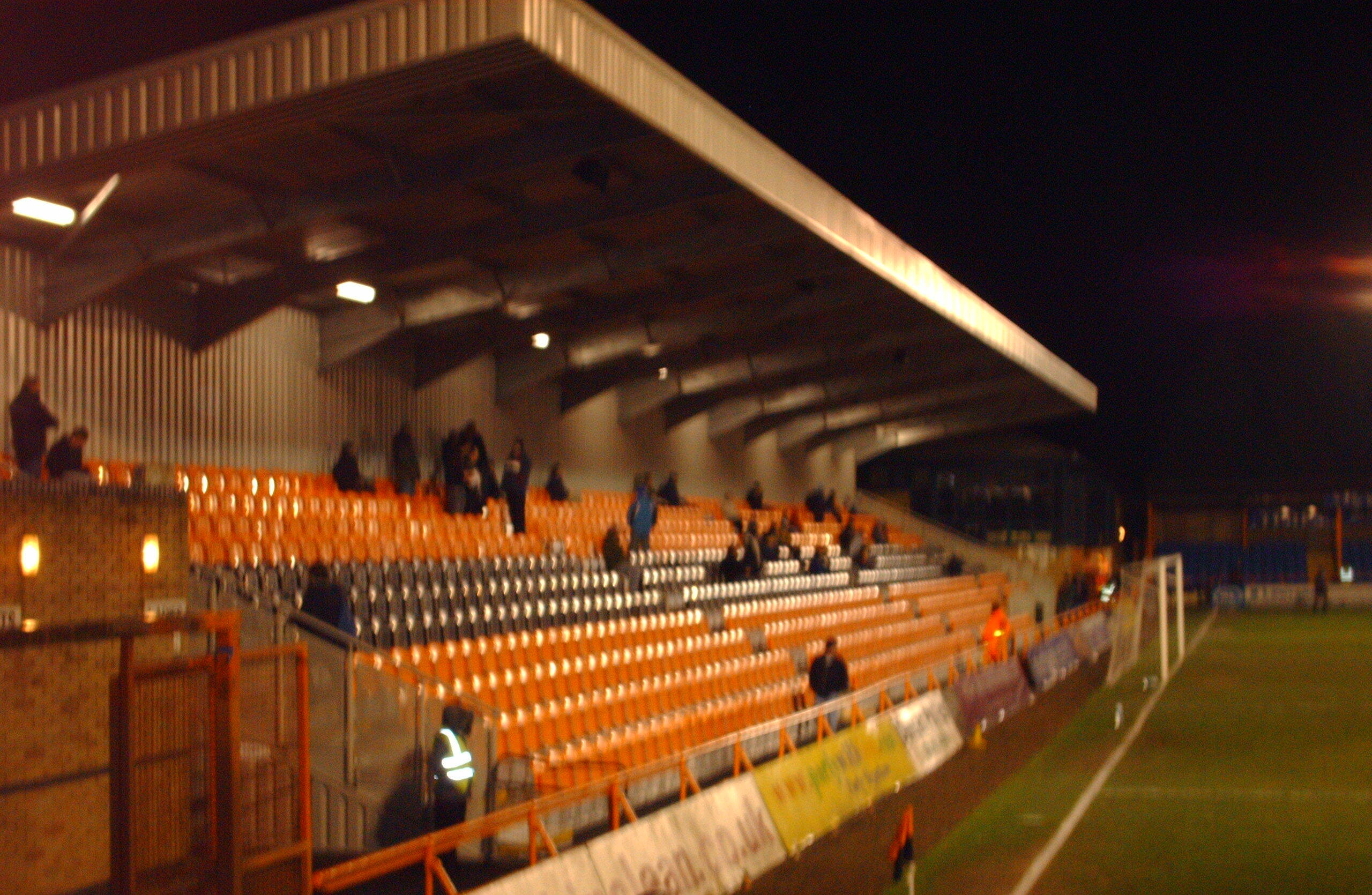
Underhill Stadium, South Stand at Night

Barnet opened the 1,016 seater South Stand in 2008 to replace the temporary structure which had stood in its place for over ten years. The stand was first used for the FA Cup victory over Swindon Town in January 2008, just a matter of weeks after work had started.

The Bees also erected a temporary covered structure in the North-East corner of the ground with seated capacity of 240. This was built so away supporters could have the choice between sitting or standing as the stand was adjacent to the away terraced section.

These improvements finally brought Underhill to Football League standards and the capacity was increased to 5,568.

The club announced that work was underway in order to erect four corner floodlights, to be 25 metres high and have a 500 Lux value as opposed to the previous 350. The eight old pylons dating from 1962 were removed. Work was completed prior to the opening pre-season game of the 2010–2011 season against Arsenal and the stadium capacity was again increased to 6,023 as a result.

== Stands ==
Underhill had seven stands. On the bottom end of the ground was the South Stand; the East Terrace was split into three sections, with the home fans allocated the two southernmost parts and the remaining section allocated to away supporters. Adjacent to the East Terrace stood the North East Family Stand with covered seating for away supporters. The tiny North Terrace backed onto Westcombe Drive, where residents could watch the action. The Main Stand was flanked by two smaller stands, the North West Terrace and Family Stand.

After a matchday incident on the East Terrace, the club acted to increase the distance between home and away supporters. Away fans were segregated further towards the north of the terrace. When away support was expected to number over 500, the whole of the North-East section was opened, and the Central section closed to enforce the new segregation arrangements. The situation further highlighted the inadequacy of Underhill as a Football League stadium, even though it met league criteria.

In the South-West Corner of the ground stood the Durham Suite, named after Bees midfielder Kevin Durham who died in 1991. Although not part of the ground, the Pavilion behind the South Stand was owned by the club and acted as the social club for fans.

== Record attendance ==
The record attendance at Underhill was 11,026 against Wycombe Wanderers on 23 February 1952 for an Amateur cup tie.
