= 1995–96 Rochdale A.F.C. season =

English football club season

Rochdale
1995–96 season
- Manager: Mick Docherty
- League Division Three: 15th
- FA Cup: 3rd Round
- League Cup: 1st Round
- Top goalscorer: League: Steve Whitehall; All: Steve Whitehall

The 1995–96 season was Rochdale A.F.C.'s 89th in existence and their 22nd consecutive in the fourth tier of the English football league, named at the time as the Football League Third Division.

== Statistics ==
| No. | Pos | Nat | Player | Total | | Division 3 | | F.A. Cup | | League Cup | | League Trophy | | Lancashire Cup | |
| No. | Pos | Nat | Player | Apps | Goals | Apps | Goals | Apps | Goals | Apps | Goals | Apps | Goals | Apps | Goals |
|---|---|---|---|---|---|---|---|---|---|---|---|---|---|---|---|
| | GK | (England) ENG | Ian Gray | 30 | 0 | 20+0 | 0 | 3+0 | 0 | 2+0 | 0 | 3+0 | 0 | 2+0 | 0 |
| | MF | (England) ENG | Alex Russell | 28 | 0 | 20+5 | 0 | 0+1 | 0 | 2+0 | 0 | 0+0 | 0 | 0+0 | 0 |
| | DF | (England) ENG | Kevin Formby | 29 | 0 | 18+0 | 0 | 4+0 | 0 | 2+0 | 0 | 3+0 | 0 | 2+0 | 0 |
| | MF | (England) ENG | Ian Thompstone | 33 | 2 | 11+14 | 1 | 2+2 | 0 | 1+0 | 1 | 1+1 | 0 | 1+0 | 0 |
| | DF | (England) ENG | Peter Valentine | 32 | 0 | 22+1 | 0 | 4+0 | 0 | 2+0 | 0 | 1+0 | 0 | 2+0 | 0 |
| | DF | (England) ENG | Paul Butler | 48 | 3 | 38+0 | 3 | 3+0 | 0 | 2+0 | 0 | 3+0 | 0 | 2+0 | 0 |
| | MF | (England) ENG | David Thompson | 54 | 5 | 43+0 | 4 | 4+0 | 0 | 2+0 | 0 | 3+0 | 0 | 2+0 | 1 |
| | MF | (England) ENG | Dean Martin | 47 | 2 | 33+4 | 0 | 4+0 | 1 | 0+1 | 0 | 2+1 | 0 | 2+0 | 1 |
| | FW | (England) ENG | Graham Shaw | 26 | 1 | 9+9 | 0 | 0+3 | 0 | 1+0 | 1 | 1+1 | 0 | 2+0 | 0 |
| | FW | (England) ENG | Steve Whitehall | 56 | 24 | 46+0 | 20 | 4+0 | 1 | 2+0 | 0 | 3+0 | 3 | 1+0 | 0 |
| | MF | (England) ENG | Jason Peake | 56 | 7 | 45+1 | 4 | 4+0 | 2 | 2+0 | 0 | 2+0 | 1 | 2+0 | 0 |
| | FW | (Northern Ireland) NIR | Paul Williams | 16 | 0 | 1+11 | 0 | 0+0 | 0 | 1+0 | 0 | 0+1 | 0 | 1+1 | 0 |
| | MF | (England) ENG | Darren Ryan | 13 | 0 | 4+3 | 0 | 1+2 | 0 | 1+0 | 0 | 0+1 | 0 | 0+1 | 0 |
| | DF | (England) ENG | David Bayliss | 36 | 0 | 25+3 | 0 | 1+1 | 0 | 2+0 | 0 | 2+0 | 0 | 1+1 | 0 |
| | MF | (England) ENG | Derek Hall | 14 | 1 | 9+5 | 1 | 0+0 | 0 | 0+0 | 0 | 0+0 | 0 | 0+0 | 0 |
| | MF | (England) ENG | John Deary | 45 | 7 | 36+0 | 4 | 3+0 | 2 | 1+0 | 0 | 3+0 | 1 | 2+0 | 0 |
| | FW | (England) ENG | Jamie Taylor | 16 | 3 | 8+8 | 3 | 0+0 | 0 | 0+0 | 0 | 0+0 | 0 | 0+0 | 0 |
| | FW | (England) ENG | Paul Moulden | 21 | 6 | 6+10 | 1 | 0+3 | 2 | 0+0 | 0 | 2+0 | 3 | 0+0 | 0 |
| | DF | (England) ENG | Jason Hardy | 7 | 0 | 5+2 | 0 | 0+0 | 0 | 0+0 | 0 | 0+0 | 0 | 0+0 | 0 |
| | MF | (England) ENG | Mark Stuart | 38 | 13 | 32+2 | 13 | 1+0 | 0 | 0+0 | 0 | 2+0 | 0 | 0+1 | 0 |
| | DF | (England) ENG | Andy Thackeray | 34 | 0 | 27+2 | 0 | 2+0 | 0 | 0+0 | 0 | 2+0 | 0 | 1+0 | 0 |
| | MF | (England) ENG | Neil Mitchell | 4 | 0 | 3+1 | 0 | 0+0 | 0 | 0+0 | 0 | 0+0 | 0 | 0+0 | 0 |
| | GK | (England) ENG | Chris Clarke | 7 | 0 | 6+0 | 0 | 1+0 | 0 | 0+0 | 0 | 0+0 | 0 | 0+0 | 0 |
| | DF | (England) ENG | Jamie Price | 3 | 0 | 3+0 | 0 | 0+0 | 0 | 0+0 | 0 | 0+0 | 0 | 0+0 | 0 |
| | GK | (England) ENG | Kevin Pilkington | 6 | 0 | 6+0 | 0 | 0+0 | 0 | 0+0 | 0 | 0+0 | 0 | 0+0 | 0 |
| | FW | (England) ENG | Dave Lancaster | 14 | 2 | 13+1 | 2 | 0+0 | 0 | 0+0 | 0 | 0+0 | 0 | 0+0 | 0 |
| | GK | (England) ENG | Lance Key | 14 | 0 | 14+0 | 0 | 0+0 | 0 | 0+0 | 0 | 0+0 | 0 | 0+0 | 0 |
| | MF | (England) ENG | Jimmy Proctor | 3 | 0 | 1+2 | 0 | 0+0 | 0 | 0+0 | 0 | 0+0 | 0 | 0+0 | 0 |
| | MF | (England) ENG | Franny Powell | 2 | 0 | 0+2 | 0 | 0+0 | 0 | 0+0 | 0 | 0+0 | 0 | 0+0 | 0 |
| | DF | (England) ENG | Neil Barlow | 2 | 0 | 1+1 | 0 | 0+0 | 0 | 0+0 | 0 | 0+0 | 0 | 0+0 | 0 |
| | DF | (England) ENG | Paul Lyons | 3 | 0 | 1+2 | 0 | 0+0 | 0 | 0+0 | 0 | 0+0 | 0 | 0+0 | 0 |

== Final League Table ==
| Pos | Team | Pld | W | D | L | GF | GA | GD | Pts |
|---|---|---|---|---|---|---|---|---|---|
| 13 | Doncaster Rovers | 46 | 16 | 11 | 19 | 49 | 60 | −11 | 59 |
| 14 | Exeter City | 46 | 13 | 18 | 15 | 46 | 53 | −7 | 57 |
| 15 | Rochdale | 46 | 14 | 13 | 19 | 57 | 61 | −4 | 55 |
| 16 | Cambridge United | 46 | 14 | 12 | 20 | 61 | 71 | −10 | 54 |
| 17 | Fulham | 46 | 12 | 17 | 17 | 57 | 63 | −6 | 53 |

== Competitions ==
=== Football League Third Division ===
| 12 August 1995 1 | Rochdale | 3–3 | Cardiff City | Rochdale |
| | Whitehall 13', 26' (pen.); Thompson 80' | Report | Bird 31', 42'; Dale 58' | Stadium: Spotland Stadium; Attendance: 2321; Referee: SJ Baines |

| 19 August 1995 2 | Darlington | 0–1 | Rochdale | Darlington |
| | | Report | Whitehall 79' (pen.) | Stadium: Feethams; Attendance: 2139 |

| 26 August 1995 3 | Rochdale | 4–0 | Hartlepool United | Rochdale |
| | Taylor 24', 54', 80'; Thompson 56' | Report | | Stadium: Spotland Stadium; Attendance: 1794 |

| 29 August 1995 4 | Torquay United | 1–0 | Rochdale | Torquay |
| | Stamps 52' | Report | Formby (red card) 32' | Stadium: Plainmoor; Attendance: 2139 |

| 2 September 1995 5 | Rochdale | 1–2 | Northampton Town | Rochdale |
| | Butler 80' | Report | Burns 25'; White 72' | Stadium: Spotland Stadium; Attendance: 2193 |

| 9 September 1995 6 | Lincoln City | 1–2 | Rochdale | Lincoln |
| | Onwere 74' | Report | Whitehall 20' (pen.); Stuart 83' | Stadium: Sincil Bank; Attendance: 2408 |

| 12 September 1995 7 | Fulham | 1–1 | Rochdale | London |
| | Morgan 36' | Report | Deary 38' | Stadium: Craven Cottage; Attendance: 3848 |

| 16 September 1995 8 | Rochdale | 1–1 | Mansfield Town | Rochdale |
| | Stuart 77' | Report | Slawson 67' | Stadium: Spotland Stadium; Attendance: 2173 |

| 23 September 1995 9 | Doncaster Rovers | 0–3 | Rochdale | Doncaster |
| | | Report | Whitehall 23' (pen.); Schofield 72' (o.g.); Stuart 87' | Stadium: Belle Vue; Attendance: 2217 |

| 30 September 1995 10 | Rochdale | 4–2 | Exeter City | Rochdale |
| | Stuart 6'; Deary 21'; Whitehall 22'; Peake 72' | Report | Phillips 74'; Cecere 86' | Stadium: Spotland Stadium; Attendance: 2052 |

| 7 October 1995 11 | Gillingham | 1–0 | Rochdale | Gillingham |
| | Watson 27' | Report | | Stadium: Priestfield Stadium; Attendance: 7785; Referee: AP D'Urso |

| 14 October 1995 12 | Rochdale | 1–1 | Colchester United | Rochdale |
| | Stuart 67' | Report | Reinelt 30'; Fry (red card) 80' | Stadium: Spotland Stadium; Attendance: 2193 |

| 21 October 1995 13 | Barnet | 0–4 | Rochdale | Chipping Barnet |
| | | Report | Peake 50'; Stuart 70', 75'; Whitehall 86' | Stadium: Underhill Stadium; Attendance: 2039; Referee: AG Wiley |

| 28 October 1995 14 | Rochdale | 3–1 | Cambridge United | Rochdale |
| | Moulden 4'; Whitehall 47', 69' | Report | Butler 57' | Stadium: Spotland Stadium; Attendance: 2344 |

| 31 October 1995 15 | Rochdale | 1–3 | Chester City | Rochdale |
| | Peake 64' | Report | Regis 22'; Noteman 49'; Shelton 67' | Stadium: Spotland Stadium; Attendance: 3018 |

| 4 November 1995 16 | Scunthorpe United | 1–3 | Rochdale | Scunthorpe |
| | Ford 84' | Report | Stuart 2'; Whitehall 38', 89' | Stadium: Glanford Park; Attendance: 3003 |

| 18 November 1995 17 | Rochdale | 0–0 | Hereford United | Rochdale |
| | | Report | | Stadium: Spotland Stadium; Attendance: 2619; Referee: MA Riley |

| 25 November 1995 18 | Plymouth Argyle | 2–0 | Rochdale | Plymouth |
| | Littlejohn 49'; Evans 86' | Report | | Stadium: Home Park; Attendance: 6558 |

| 9 December 1995 19 | Rochdale | 1–0 | Doncaster Rovers | Rochdale |
| | Whitehall 32' (pen.) | Report | | Stadium: Spotland Stadium; Attendance: 2168; Referee: D Laws |

| 16 December 1995 20 | Exeter City | 2–0 | Rochdale | Exeter |
| | Richardson 14'; Gavin 88' | Report | | Stadium: St James Park; Attendance: 3152 |

| 22 December 1995 21 | Leyton Orient | 2–0 | Rochdale | London |
| | West 3', 55' | Report | | Stadium: Brisbane Road; Attendance: 5399; Referee: P Rejer |

| 2 January 1996 22 | Wigan Athletic | 2–0 | Rochdale | Wigan |
| | Díaz 63'; Martínez 68' | Report | Butler (red card) 83' | Stadium: Springfield Park; Attendance: 2624; Referee: UD Rennie |

| 13 January 1996 23 | Rochdale | 1–2 | Darlington | Rochdale |
| | Whitehall 24' (pen.) | Report | Appleby 75' (pen.); Olsson 83' | Stadium: Spotland Stadium; Attendance: 1945; Referee: MJ Brandwood |

| 20 January 1996 24 | Cardiff City | 1–0 | Rochdale | Cardiff |
| | Gardner 80' | Report | | Stadium: Ninian Park; Attendance: 2230 |

| 23 January 1996 25 | Scarborough | 1–1 | Rochdale | Scarborough |
| | Trebble 68' | Report | Peake 69' | Stadium: Athletic Ground; Attendance: 1400 |

| 3 February 1996 26 | Hartlepool United | 1–1 | Rochdale | Hartlepool |
| | Ingram (red card) 39'; Tait 73' | Report | Whitehall 68' | Stadium: Victoria Park; Attendance: 1927 |

| 10 February 1996 27 | Rochdale | 0–2 | Scarborough | Rochdale |
| | | Report | Toman 52'; Midgley 56' | Stadium: Spotland Stadium; Attendance: 1662 |

| 13 February 1996 28 | Rochdale | 1–1 | Bury | Rochdale |
| | Butler 63' | Report | Carter 79' | Stadium: Spotland Stadium; Attendance: 3048 |

| 17 February 1996 29 | Rochdale | 1–1 | Fulham | Rochdale |
| | Stuart 14' | Report | Conroy 28'; Jupp (red card) 47' | Stadium: Spotland Stadium; Attendance: 1923; Referee: GB Frankland |

| 20 February 1996 30 | Northampton Town | 2–1 | Rochdale | Northampton |
| | Warburton 83'; Worboys 86' | Report | Thompstone 80' | Stadium: County Ground; Attendance: 3090 |

| 27 February 1996 31 | Rochdale | 3–3 | Lincoln City | Rochdale |
| | Whitehall 36' (pen.); Stuart 45', 57' | Report | Carbon 19'; Ainsworth 47'; Stuart 73' (o.g.) | Stadium: Spotland Stadium; Attendance: 1253 |

| 2 March 1996 32 | Preston North End | 1–2 | Rochdale | Preston |
| | Saville 14' | Report | Whitehall 2'; Stuart 38' | Stadium: Deepdale; Attendance: 9698 |

| 9 March 1996 33 | Rochdale | 1–0 | Leyton Orient | Rochdale |
| | Lancaster 13' | Report | | Stadium: Spotland Stadium; Attendance: 1934; Referee: J Rushton |

| 12 March 1996 34 | Rochdale | 0–3 | Preston North End | Rochdale |
| | | Report | Birch 17'; Wilkinson 30'; Moyes 61' | Stadium: Spotland Stadium; Attendance: 5497 |

| 16 March 1996 35 | Bury | 1–1 | Rochdale | Bury |
| | Matthews 28' | Report | Butler 2' | Stadium: Gigg Lane; Attendance: 3473 |

| 19 March 1996 36 | Rochdale | 3–0 | Torquay United | Rochdale |
| | Deary 32'; Whitehall 72' (pen.); Thompson 79' | Report | | Stadium: Spotland Stadium; Attendance: 1206 |

| 23 March 1996 37 | Rochdale | 0–2 | Wigan Athletic | Rochdale |
| | | Report | Peake 24' (o.g.); Biggins 63' (pen.) | Stadium: Spotland Stadium; Attendance: 2870; Referee: EK Wolstenholme |

| 30 March 1996 38 | Rochdale | 2–0 | Gillingham | Rochdale |
| | Stuart 11'; Thompson 37' | Report | | Stadium: Spotland Stadium; Attendance: 2098; Referee: JA Kirkby |

| 2 April 1996 39 | Colchester United | 1–0 | Rochdale | Colchester |
| | Reinelt 54' | Report | | Stadium: Layer Road; Attendance: 3021 |

| 6 April 1996 40 | Cambridge United | 2–1 | Rochdale | Cambridge |
| | Craddock 6'; Barnwell 49' | Report | Lancaster 45' | Stadium: Abbey Stadium; Attendance: 2186 |

| 8 April 1996 41 | Rochdale | 0–4 | Barnet | Rochdale |
| | | Report | Hodges 1', 62', 65', 69' | Stadium: Spotland Stadium; Attendance: 1492 |

| 13 April 1996 42 | Chester City | 1–2 | Rochdale | Chester |
| | Ryan 2' (pen.); Jackson (red card) 86' | Report | Whitehall 39', 84' | Stadium: Deva Stadium; Attendance: 2158 |

| 16 April 1996 43 | Mansfield Town | 2–2 | Rochdale | Mansfield |
| | Boothroyd 13' (pen.); Williams 75' | Report | Hall 76'; Whitehall 81' | Stadium: Field Mill; Attendance: 1814 |

| 20 April 1996 44 | Rochdale | 1–1 | Scunthorpe United | Rochdale |
| | Deary 3'; Bayliss (red card) 31' | Report | Clarkson 64' | Stadium: Spotland Stadium; Attendance: 1654; Referee: R Pearson |

| 27 April 1996 45 | Rochdale | 0–1 | Plymouth Argyle | Rochdale |
| | | Report | Evans 70' | Stadium: Spotland Stadium; Attendance: 2355 |

| 4 May 1996 46 | Hereford United | 2–0 | Rochdale | Hereford |
| | Cross 45'; White 83' | Report | | Stadium: Edgar Street; Attendance: 5880 |

=== F.A. Cup ===
| 11 November 1995 1 | Rochdale | 5–3 | Rotherham United | Rochdale |
| | Moulden 9', 74'; Whitehall 14' (pen.); Peake 19', 49' | Report | Goater 72' (pen.), 81'; McGlashan 83' | Stadium: Spotland Stadium; Attendance: 3817; Referee: R Pearson |

| 2 December 1995 2 | Rochdale | 2–2 | Darlington | Rochdale |
| | Deary 66', 85' | Report | Shaw 42'; Olsson 71' | Stadium: Spotland Stadium; Attendance: 3732; Referee: NS Barry |

| 12 December 1995 2 | Darlington | 0–1 | Rochdale | Darlington |
| | | Report | Martin 80' | Stadium: Feethams; Attendance: 4131 |

| 6 January 1996 3 | Liverpool | 7–0 | Rochdale | Liverpool |
| | Fowler 21'; Collymore 43', 44', 70'; Valentine 48' (o.g.); Rush 61'; McAteer 85' | Report | | Stadium: Anfield; Attendance: 28126; Referee: KA Leach |

=== Football League Cup (Coca Cola Cup) ===
| 15 August 1995 1 | Rochdale | 2–1 | York City | Rochdale |
| | Shaw 13'; Thompstone 72' | Report | Baker 68' | Stadium: Spotland Stadium; Attendance: 1390; Referee: SW Mathieson |

| 22 August 1995 1 | York City | 5–1 (a.e.t.) (6–3 agg.) | Rochdale | York |
| | Baker 2'; Barnes 49', 110'; Pepper 98'; Peverell 117' | Report | Tutill 70' (o.g.) | Stadium: Bootham Crescent; Attendance: 2130; Referee: AN Butler |

=== Football League Trophy (Auto Windscreens Shield) ===
| 26 September 1995 1 | Lincoln City | 4–3 | Rochdale | Lincoln |
| | Huckerby 36', 81'; Johnson 63', 80' | Report | Whitehall 44'; Peake 84'; Deary 86' | Stadium: Sincil Bank; Attendance: 1238 |

| 24 October 1995 1 | Rochdale | 5–2 | Darlington | Rochdale |
| | Whitehall 7'; Gregan 33' (o.g.); Moulden 55', 73', 74' | Report | Olsson 8'; Appleby 84' | Stadium: Spotland Stadium; Attendance: 1055; Referee: SJ Baines |

| 28 November 1995 2 | Chesterfield | 2–1 | Rochdale | Chesterfield |
| | Roberts 77'; Robinson 82' | Report | Whitehall 9' | Stadium: Saltergate Recreation Ground; Attendance: 2344 |

=== Lancashire Cup ===
| 22 July 1995 | Preston North End | 2–2 | Rochdale | Preston |
| | Goal | | Martin; Thompson | Stadium: Deepdale |

| 29 July 1995 | Rochdale | 0–1 | Blackpool | Rochdale |
| | | | Goal | Stadium: Spotland Stadium; Attendance: 1265 |
