= 1994–95 Rochdale A.F.C. season =

English football club season

Rochdale
1994–95 season
- Manager: Dave Sutton; Mick Docherty
- League Division Three: 15th
- FA Cup: 1st Round
- League Cup: 1st Round
- Top goalscorer: League: Steve Whitehall; All: Steve Whitehall

The 1994–95 season was Rochdale A.F.C.'s 88th in existence and their 21st consecutive in the fourth tier of the English football league, named at the time as the Football League Third Division.

== Statistics ==
No.	Pos	Nat	Player	Total		Division 3		F.A. Cup		League Cup		League Trophy		Lancashire Cup		Rose Bowl	
No.	Pos	Nat	Player	Apps	Goals	Apps	Goals	Apps	Goals	Apps	Goals	Apps	Goals	Apps	Goals	Apps	Goals
	GK	(England) ENG	Chris Clarke	33	0	24+0	0	0+0	0	2+0	0	3+0	0	2+1	0	1+0	0
	DF	(England) ENG	Andy Thackeray	55	3	41+0	3	1+0	0	2+0	0	7+0	0	3+0	0	1+0	0
	DF	(England) ENG	Kevin Formby	41	0	27+1	0	1+0	0	2+0	0	7+0	0	2+0	0	1+0	0
	MF	(England) ENG	Shaun Reid	41	6	27+1	3	1+0	0	2+0	0	6+0	2	3+0	1	1+0	0
	DF	(England) ENG	Alan Reeves	11	0	5+0	0	0+0	0	2+0	0	0+0	0	3+0	0	1+0	0
	DF	(England) ENG	Neil Matthews	25	0	10+3	0	1+0	0	1+0	0	6+0	0	2+1	0	1+0	0
	MF	(England) ENG	David Thompson	50	6	38+2	6	0+0	0	2+0	0	7+0	0	0+0	0	1+0	0
	MF	(England) ENG	Jason Peake	49	3	36+3	2	1+0	0	1+0	0	5+0	0	2+0	1	1+0	0
	MF	(England) ENG	Jon Bowden	14	0	6+5	0	0+0	0	1+0	0	0+0	0	1+1	0	0+0	0
	FW	(England) ENG	Steve Whitehall	56	18	41+1	10	1+0	0	2+0	1	7+0	6	3+0	0	1+0	1
	MF	(England) ENG	Mark Stuart	43	4	26+5	2	1+0	0	1+1	0	2+3	1	3+0	1	1+0	0
	MF	(England) ENG	Darren Ryan	37	2	15+10	2	0+1	0	1+1	0	1+4	0	1+2	0	0+1	0
	FW	(Northern Ireland) NIR	Paul Williams	21	8	12+2	5	1+0	0	1+0	0	2+0	0	2+0	2	1+0	1
	MF	(Wales) WAL	Steve Doyle	16	0	7+4	0	1+0	0	0+0	0	2+0	0	2+0	0	0+0	0
	DF	(England) ENG	Paul Butler	50	3	39+0	3	1+0	0	1+0	0	7+0	0	1+0	0	0+1	0
	MF	(England) ENG	Derek Hall	15	1	5+4	1	0+0	0	1+1	0	1+2	0	0+0	0	0+1	0
	FW	(England) ENG	Stuart Rimmer	3	0	3+0	0	0+0	0	0+0	0	0+0	0	0+0	0	0+0	0
	GK	(England) ENG	Neil Dunford	3	0	2+0	0	1+0	0	0+0	0	0+0	0	0+0	0	0+0	0
	MF	(England) ENG	Alex Russell	13	1	2+5	1	0+0	0	0+0	0	1+2	0	1+1	0	0+1	0
	GK	(England) ENG	Matt Dickins	5	0	4+0	0	0+0	0	0+0	0	1+0	0	0+0	0	0+0	0
	FW	(England) ENG	Jamie Taylor	12	1	1+8	0	0+0	0	0+0	0	0+2	1	0+1	0	0+0	0
	FW	(England) ENG	Richard Sharpe	23	3	9+7	2	0+1	0	0+0	0	6+0	1	0+0	0	0+0	0
	DF	(England) ENG	Darren Oliver	10	0	8+1	0	0+0	0	0+0	0	0+0	0	1+0	0	0+0	0
	GK	(England) ENG	Ian Gray	15	0	12+0	0	0+0	0	0+0	0	3+0	0	0+0	0	0+0	0
	DF	(England) ENG	Peter Valentine	27	2	27+0	2	0+0	0	0+0	0	0+0	0	0+0	0	0+0	0
	FW	(England) ENG	Craig Whitington	1	0	1+0	0	0+0	0	0+0	0	0+0	0	0+0	0	0+0	0
	MF	(England) ENG	Dean Martin	15	0	12+3	0	0+0	0	0+0	0	0+0	0	0+0	0	0+0	0
	MF	(England) ENG	John Deary	20	1	17+0	1	0+0	0	0+0	0	3+0	0	0+0	0	0+0	0
	FW	(England) ENG	Graham Shaw	4	0	4+0	0	0+0	0	0+0	0	0+0	0	0+0	0	0+0	0
	DF	(England) ENG	David Bayliss	1	0	1+0	0	0+0	0	0+0	0	0+0	0	0+0	0	0+0	0
	GK	(England) ENG	Martin Hodge	2	0	0+0	0	0+0	0	0+0	0	0+0	0	1+1	0	0+0	0
	FW	(England) ENG	Owen Pickard	1	0	0+0	0	0+0	0	0+0	0	0+0	0	0+0	0	0+1	0

== Final League Table ==
Pos	Team	Pld	W	D	L	GF	GA	GD	Pts
13	Torquay United	42	14	13	15	54	57	−3	55
14	Wigan Athletic	42	14	10	18	53	60	−7	52
15	Rochdale	42	12	14	16	44	67	−23	50
16	Hereford United	42	12	13	17	45	62	−17	49
17	Northampton Town	42	10	14	18	45	67	−22	44

== Competitions ==
=== Football League Third Division ===
13 August 1994 1	Bury	0–1	Rochdale	Bury
		Report	Thompson 51'	Stadium: Gigg Lane; Attendance: 3230

20 August 1994 2	Rochdale	4–1	Chesterfield	Rochdale
	Reid 16'; Thompson 50'; Thackeray 55'; Whitehall 69'	Report	Norris 54'	Stadium: Spotland Stadium; Attendance: 2122

27 August 1994 3	Gillingham	1–1	Rochdale	Gillingham
	Butler 83'	Report	Hall 32'	Stadium: Priestfield Stadium; Attendance: 3009; Referee: AP D'Urso

30 August 1994 4	Rochdale	1–0	Lincoln City	Rochdale
	Whitehall 45'	Report		Stadium: Spotland Stadium; Attendance: 1974

3 September 1994 5	Rochdale	1–3	Hereford United	Rochdale
	Doyle (red card) 66'; Williams 83'	Report	James 26'; Preedy 46'; White 89'	Stadium: Spotland Stadium; Attendance: 2258

10 September 1994 6	Northampton Town	1–2	Rochdale	Northampton
	Trott 38'	Report	Reid 62'; Thompson 66'	Stadium: County Ground; Attendance: 2887

13 September 1994 7	Barnet	6–2	Rochdale	Chipping Barnet
	Freedman 12', 16', 39', 56'; Cooper 33'; Gale 89'	Report	Reid 36' (pen.); Williams 55'	Stadium: Underhill Stadium; Attendance: 1688

17 September 1994 8	Rochdale	0–3	Bury	Rochdale
		Report	Carter 69'; Paskin 75', 87'	Stadium: Spotland Stadium; Attendance: 3748

24 September 1994 9	Scarborough	2–4	Rochdale	Scarborough
	Charles 22' (pen.); White 52'; Meyer (red card) 75'	Report	Williams 12', 61'; Whitehall 55'; Butler 65'	Stadium: Athletic Ground; Attendance: 1201

1 October 1994 10	Rochdale	2–0	Doncaster Rovers	Rochdale
	Williams 74'; Peake 81'	Report	Brabin (red card) 25'	Stadium: Spotland Stadium; Attendance: 2445

8 October 1994 11	Rochdale	1–2	Fulham	Rochdale
	Whitehall 21'	Report	Brazil 65'; Hurlock 79'	Stadium: Spotland Stadium; Attendance: 2573

15 October 1994 12	Wigan Athletic	4–0	Rochdale	Wigan
	Kilford 6', 32'; Strong 20'; Benjamin 37'	Report		Stadium: Springfield Park; Attendance: 2007; Referee: PL Wright

22 October 1994 13	Torquay United	4–1	Rochdale	Torquay
	Goodridge 38', 86'; Hodges 64'; Hathaway 77'	Report	Thackeray 58'	Stadium: Plainmoor; Attendance: 2547

29 October 1994 14	Rochdale	3–3	Mansfield Town	Rochdale
	Butler 8'; Whitehall 53', 76'	Report	Hadley 31'; Noteman 44' (pen.); Wilkinson 51'	Stadium: Spotland Stadium; Attendance: 1968

5 November 1994 15	Carlisle United	4–1	Rochdale	Carlisle
	Davey 45', 61'; Reeves 58'; Edmondson 88'	Report	Stuart 89'	Stadium: Brunton Park; Attendance: 6000

19 November 1994 16	Rochdale	0–0	Colchester United	Rochdale
		Report		Stadium: Spotland Stadium; Attendance: 1903

26 November 1994 17	Hartlepool United	1–0	Rochdale	Hartlepool
	Sloan 22'	Report	Sharpe (red card) 82'	Stadium: Victoria Park; Attendance: 1387

10 December 1994 18	Chesterfield	2–2	Rochdale	Chesterfield
	Hewitt 21', 28'	Report	Russell 15'; Whitehall 84' (pen.)	Stadium: Saltergate Recreation Ground; Attendance: 2457

17 December 1994 19	Rochdale	2–1	Gillingham	Rochdale
	Stuart 25'; Valentine 31'	Report	Foster 64'	Stadium: Spotland Stadium; Attendance: 1665

26 December 1994 20	Preston North End	3–0	Rochdale	Preston
	Smart 10'; Kidd 28'; Conroy 41'	Report		Stadium: Deepdale; Attendance: 10491

27 December 1994 21	Rochdale	0–2	Walsall	Rochdale
	Oliver (red card) 38'	Report	Wilson 38' (pen.); Lightbourne 74'	Stadium: Spotland Stadium; Attendance: 2438; Referee: JT Winter

31 December 1994 22	Scunthorpe United	4–1	Rochdale	Scunthorpe
	Mudd 11'; Bullimore 45' (pen.); Eyre 57'; Thompstone 90'	Report	Butler 87'	Stadium: Glanford Park; Attendance: 2653

7 January 1995 23	Rochdale	2–0	Torquay United	Rochdale
	Sharpe 46'; Thompson 49'	Report		Stadium: Spotland Stadium; Attendance: 1636

14 January 1995 24	Exeter City	0–0	Rochdale	Exeter
		Report		Stadium: St James Park; Attendance: 2316

21 January 1995 25	Rochdale	1–1	Carlisle United	Rochdale
	Peake 70'	Report	Walling 68'	Stadium: Spotland Stadium; Attendance: 3289

4 February 1995 26	Rochdale	1–0	Hartlepool United	Rochdale
	Deary 44'	Report		Stadium: Spotland Stadium; Attendance: 1848

11 February 1995 27	Colchester United	0–0	Rochdale	Colchester
		Report		Stadium: Layer Road; Attendance: 3080

18 February 1995 28	Rochdale	0–1	Exeter City	Rochdale
		Report	Cooper 26'	Stadium: Spotland Stadium; Attendance: 1945

25 February 1995 29	Doncaster Rovers	0–1	Rochdale	Doncaster
		Report	Sharpe 41'	Stadium: Belle Vue; Attendance: 2246

7 March 1995 30	Mansfield Town	1–1	Rochdale	Mansfield
	Wilkinson 80'	Report	Whitehall 34'	Stadium: Field Mill; Attendance: 2931

11 March 1995 31	Rochdale	0–0	Northampton Town	Rochdale
		Report		Stadium: Spotland Stadium; Attendance: 1894

18 March 1995 32	Lincoln City	2–2	Rochdale	Lincoln
	West 10'; Johnson 44'	Report	Thompson 52'; Valentine 56'	Stadium: Sincil Bank; Attendance: 2939

21 March 1995 33	Rochdale	2–0	Darlington	Rochdale
	Thompson 64'; Whitehall 89'	Report		Stadium: Spotland Stadium; Attendance: 1471

25 March 1995 34	Hereford United	0–0	Rochdale	Hereford
		Report		Stadium: Edgar Street; Attendance: 1998

1 April 1995 35	Rochdale	2–2	Barnet	Rochdale
	McDonald 26' (o.g.); Thackeray 88'	Report	Freedman 44', 52'	Stadium: Spotland Stadium; Attendance: 1834

8 April 1995 36	Rochdale	1–2	Scunthorpe United	Rochdale
	Ryan 13'	Report	Turnbull 60'; Kiwomya 72'	Stadium: Spotland Stadium; Attendance: 1720

15 April 1995 37	Walsall	0–0	Rochdale	Walsall
		Report		Stadium: Bescot Stadium; Attendance: 3766; Referee: UD Rennie

17 April 1995 38	Rochdale	0–1	Preston North End	Rochdale
		Report	Davey 39'	Stadium: Spotland Stadium; Attendance: 4012; Referee: G Cain

22 April 1995 39	Darlington	4–0	Rochdale	Darlington
	Worboys 20' (pen.); Gaughan 32', 48'; Himsworth 73'	Report	Thackeray (red card) 20'	Stadium: Feethams; Attendance: 1886

25 April 1995 40	Rochdale	1–1	Scarborough	Rochdale
	Ryan 82'	Report	Davis 10'	Stadium: Spotland Stadium; Attendance: 1170

29 April 1995 41	Rochdale	1–0	Wigan Athletic	Rochdale
	Whitehall 28' (pen.); Deary (red card) 30'	Report		Stadium: Spotland Stadium; Attendance: 1949; Referee: PR Richards

6 May 1995 42	Fulham	5–0	Rochdale	London
	Cusack 6', 11', 73'; Thomas 16'; Brazil 59'	Report		Stadium: Craven Cottage; Attendance: 4342

=== F.A. Cup ===
12 November 1994 1	Walsall	3–0	Rochdale	Walsall
	Lightbourne 34'; Butler 42', 78'	Report		Stadium: Bescot Stadium; Attendance: 3619; Referee: GR Ashby

=== Football League Cup (Coca Cola Cup) ===
16 August 1994 1	Rochdale	1–2	Mansfield Town	Rochdale
	Whitehall 14'	Report	Wilkinson 56', 87'	Stadium: Spotland Stadium; Attendance: 1746; Referee: RD Furnandiz

23 August 1994 1	Mansfield Town	1–0 (3–1 agg.)	Rochdale	Mansfield
	Wilkinson 32'	Report		Stadium: Field Mill; Attendance: 2234; Referee: T Heilbron

=== Football League Trophy (Auto Windscreens Shield) ===
27 September 1994 1	Blackpool	1–2	Rochdale	Blackpool
	Mitchell 19'; Thompson (red card) 87'	Report	Stuart 63'; Burke 66' (o.g.)	Stadium: Bloomfield Road; Attendance: 1817

18 October 1994 1	Rochdale	1–0	Wigan Athletic	Rochdale
	Taylor 89'	Report		Stadium: Spotland Stadium; Attendance: 1004; Referee: WC Burns

29 November 1994 2	Rochdale	2–2 (a.e.t.) (4–3 p)	Darlington	Rochdale
	Whitehall 10', 58'	Report	Worboys 13'; Appleby 22' (pen.)	Stadium: Spotland Stadium; Attendance: 1069

11 January 1995 QF	Rochdale	2–1	Stockport County	Rochdale
	Whitehall 13', 64'	Report	Wallace 43'	Stadium: Spotland Stadium; Attendance: 2154

7 February 1995 SF	Bury	1–2	Rochdale	Bury
	Paskin 16'	Report	Sharpe 13'; Reid 40'	Stadium: Gigg Lane; Attendance: 3341

28 February 1995 F	Carlisle United	4–1	Rochdale	Carlisle
	Currie 14'; Thomas 26', 44'; Conway 80'	Report	Whitehall 46' (pen.)	Stadium: Brunton Park; Attendance: 8647

14 March 1995 F	Rochdale	2–1 (3–5 agg.)	Carlisle United	Rochdale
	Whitehall 13'; Reid 22'	Report	Mountfield 39'	Stadium: Spotland Stadium; Attendance: 4082

=== Lancashire Cup ===
23 July 1994	Rochdale	3–2	Manchester United	Rochdale
	Stuart (pen.); Williams; Reid		Goal	Stadium: Spotland Stadium; Attendance: 4290

26 July 1994	Rochdale	2–0	Bury	Rochdale
	Peake; Williams			Stadium: Spotland Stadium; Attendance: 1370

30 July 1994	Rochdale	0–2	Burnley	Rochdale
			Goal	Stadium: Spotland Stadium; Attendance: 2024

=== Rose Bowl ===
1994	Rochdale	2–1	Oldham Athletic	Rochdale
	Whitehall; Williams		Goal	Stadium: Spotland Stadium
