= 1993–94 Rochdale A.F.C. season =

English football club season

Rochdale
1993–94 season
- Manager: Dave Sutton
- League Division Three: 9th
- FA Cup: Second round
- League Cup: Second round
- Top goalscorer: League: Dave Lancaster; Steve Whitehall; All: Dave Lancaster; Steve Whitehall; Mark Stuart

The 1993–94 season was Rochdale A.F.C.'s 87th in existence and their 20th consecutive in the fourth tier of the English football league, named at the time as the Football League Third Division.

== Statistics ==
No.	Pos	Nat	Player	Total		Division 3		F.A. Cup		League Cup		A.M. Cup		Lancashire Cup	
No.	Pos	Nat	Player	Apps	Goals	Apps	Goals	Apps	Goals	Apps	Goals	Apps	Goals	Apps	Goals
	GK	(England) ENG	Martin Hodge	52	0	42+0	0	2+0	0	4+0	0	1+0	0	3+0	0
	DF	(England) ENG	Neil Matthews	7	0	5+1	0	0+0	0	0+0	0	0+0	0	1+0	0
	DF	(Scotland) SCO	Jimmy Graham	38	0	28+1	0	1+0	0	3+1	0	1+0	0	3+0	0
	MF	(England) ENG	Shaun Reid	48	3	39+0	3	1+0	0	4+0	0	0+1	0	3+0	0
	DF	(England) ENG	Alan Reeves	51	3	41+0	3	2+0	0	4+0	0	1+0	0	3+0	0
	DF	(England) ENG	Paul Butler	48	2	38+0	2	2+0	0	4+0	0	1+0	0	3+0	0
	DF	(England) ENG	John Ryan	18	0	10+2	0	2+0	0	2+0	0	1+0	0	1+0	0
	MF	(Wales) WAL	Steve Doyle	42	1	32+2	1	1+0	0	4+0	0	1+0	0	2+0	0
	FW	(England) ENG	Dave Lancaster	49	16	37+3	14	2+0	0	4+0	1	1+0	0	2+0	1
	FW	(England) ENG	Steve Whitehall	47	15	37+2	14	2+0	1	3+0	0	0+0	0	2+1	0
	MF	(England) ENG	Mark Stuart	52	16	41+1	13	2+0	1	4+0	1	1+0	0	3+0	1
	DF	(England) ENG	Andy Thackeray	46	5	35+2	4	1+0	0	4+0	0	0+1	0	2+1	1
	DF	(England) ENG	Alex Jones	10	1	3+1	0	1+1	0	1+0	0	1+0	0	2+0	1
	MF	(England) ENG	Jon Bowden	34	4	11+18	3	2+0	0	0+1	0	1+0	0	1+0	1
	FW	(England) ENG	Andy Flounders	17	3	9+2	0	0+0	0	2+1	1	0+0	0	2+1	2
	MF	(England) ENG	Trevor Snowden	3	0	0+1	0	0+0	0	0+0	0	0+0	0	1+1	0
	FW	(England) ENG	Jamie Taylor	12	1	1+9	1	0+1	0	0+0	0	0+0	0	0+1	0
	FW	(England) ENG	Andy Milner	29	2	14+11	2	0+0	0	1+3	0	0+0	0	0+0	0
	FW	(England) ENG	Steve Mulrain	2	0	0+2	0	0+0	0	0+0	0	0+0	0	0+0	0
	DF	(England) ENG	Darren Oliver	21	0	14+5	0	1+0	0	0+0	0	1+0	0	0+0	0
	FW	(England) ENG	Andy Howard	5	1	0+5	1	0+0	0	0+0	0	0+0	0	0+0	0
	FW	(Northern Ireland) NIR	Paul Williams	11	2	9+2	2	0+0	0	0+0	0	0+0	0	0+0	0
	DF	(England) ENG	Alan Finley	1	0	1+0	0	0+0	0	0+0	0	0+0	0	0+0	0
	MF	(England) ENG	Gary Shelton	3	0	3+0	0	0+0	0	0+0	0	0+0	0	0+0	0
	MF	(England) ENG	Jason Peake	10	0	10+0	0	0+0	0	0+0	0	0+0	0	0+0	0
	DF	(England) ENG	Kevin Formby	5	0	2+3	0	0+0	0	0+0	0	0+0	0	0+0	0

== Final League Table ==
Pos	Team	Pld	W	D	L	GF	GA	GD	Pts	Promotion or relegation
7	Carlisle United	42	18	10	14	57	42	+15	64	Qualification for the Third Division play-offs
8	Chesterfield	42	16	14	12	55	48	+7	62	
9	Rochdale	42	16	12	14	63	51	+12	60	
10	Walsall	42	17	9	16	48	53	−5	60	
11	Scunthorpe United	42	15	14	13	64	56	+8	59	

== Competitions ==
=== Football League Third Division ===
14 August 1993 1	Darlington	1–1	Rochdale	Darlington
	Himsworth 84'	Report	Thackeray 71'	Stadium: Feethams; Attendance: 2327

21 August 1993 2	Rochdale	3–0	Gillingham	Rochdale
	Butler 36'; Whitehall 42'; Stuart 79'	Report		Stadium: Spotland Stadium; Attendance: 2092; Referee: JA Kirkby

28 August 1993 3	Carlisle United	0–1	Rochdale	Carlisle
		Report	Reeves 6'	Stadium: Brunton Park; Attendance: 5438

31 August 1993 4	Rochdale	1–2	Wigan Athletic	Rochdale
	Whitehall 42'	Report	McKearney 70'; Langley 73'	Stadium: Spotland Stadium; Attendance: 2628; Referee: EJ Parker

4 September 1993 5	Rochdale	2–0	Chester City	Rochdale
	Whitehall 9'; Doyle 41'	Report		Stadium: Spotland Stadium; Attendance: 3063

11 September 1993 6	Colchester United	2–5	Rochdale	Colchester
	McDonough 7'; Brown 36'	Report	Lancaster 11', 71'; Butler 15'; Reeves 65'; Whitehall 82'	Stadium: Layer Road; Attendance: 2776

18 September 1993 7	Rochdale	2–0	Hereford United	Rochdale
	Lancaster 8', 24'	Report		Stadium: Spotland Stadium; Attendance: 2645

25 September 1993 8	Rochdale	5–1	Chesterfield	Rochdale
	Reid 17'; Whitehall 27', 37'; Lancaster 42'; Stuart 45'	Report	Norris 15'	Stadium: Spotland Stadium; Attendance: 2841

2 October 1993 9	Doncaster Rovers	2–1	Rochdale	Doncaster
	Roche 10'; Jones 56'	Report	Lancaster 44'	Stadium: Belle Vue; Attendance: 3101

9 October 1993 10	Torquay United	1–1	Rochdale	Torquay
	Kelly 70'	Report	Stuart 23'	Stadium: Plainmoor; Attendance: 3874

16 October 1993 11	Rochdale	0–0	Walsall	Rochdale
		Report		Stadium: Spotland Stadium; Attendance: 2923; Referee: JW Lloyd

23 October 1993 12	Preston North End	2–1	Rochdale	Preston
	Ellis 56' (pen.), 62'	Report	Stuart 84'	Stadium: Deepdale; Attendance: 8491; Referee: KM Lynch

30 October 1993 13	Rochdale	0–1	Lincoln City	Rochdale
		Report	Loughlan 63'	Stadium: Spotland Stadium; Attendance: 2551

2 November 1993 14	Rochdale	1–1	Mansfield Town	Rochdale
	Howard 36'	Report	Reed 29'; Whitehall (red card) 69'	Stadium: Spotland Stadium; Attendance: 2042

6 November 1993 15	Crewe Alexandra	2–1	Rochdale	Crewe
	Jones 34'; Butler 72' (o.g.)	Report	Williams	Stadium: Gresty Road; Attendance: 4049

20 November 1993 16	Rochdale	2–1	Bury	Rochdale
	Bowden 7'; Williams 10'	Report	Mulligan 68'	Stadium: Spotland Stadium; Attendance: 3758

27 November 1993 17	Scunthorpe United	2–1	Rochdale	Scunthorpe
	Toman 49'; Thompstone 51'	Report	Stuart 66' (pen.)	Stadium: Glanford Park; Attendance: 3106

11 December 1993 18	Gillingham	1–2	Rochdale	Gillingham
	Baker (red card) 23'; Forster 87'	Report	Lancaster 37', 47'	Stadium: Priestfield Stadium; Attendance: 2493

18 December 1993 19	Rochdale	0–0	Darlington	Rochdale
		Report		Stadium: Spotland Stadium; Attendance: 2205

1 January 1994 20	Rochdale	6–2	Northampton Town	Rochdale
	Lancaster 9', 40', 74'; Whitehall 44'; Stuart 82'; Taylor 83'	Report	Gilzean 66'; Harmon 78'	Stadium: Spotland Stadium; Attendance: 2453

4 January 1994 21	Wigan Athletic	0–0	Rochdale	Wigan
		Report		Stadium: Springfield Park; Attendance: 1912

15 January 1994 22	Walsall	1–0	Rochdale	Walsall
	Lillis 2'	Report	Doyle (red card) 89'	Stadium: Bescot Stadium; Attendance: 4437

22 January 1994 23	Rochdale	4–1	Torquay United	Rochdale
	Thackeray 45'; Lancaster 68', 76'; Whitehall 85'	Report	Burton 28' (red card) 65'	Stadium: Spotland Stadium; Attendance: 2319

29 January 1994 24	Lincoln City	1–1	Rochdale	Lincoln
	Schofield 30'	Report	Milner 22'	Stadium: Sincil Bank; Attendance: 2703

5 February 1994 25	Rochdale	2–1	Preston North End	Rochdale
	Stuart 38'; Whitehall 46'	Report	Conroy 8'	Stadium: Spotland Stadium; Attendance: 4317

12 February 1994 26	Shrewsbury Town	1–1	Rochdale	Shrewsbury
	Reeves 8' (o.g.)	Report	Whitehall 54'	Stadium: Gay Meadow; Attendance: 4882

19 February 1994 27	Rochdale	0–1	Carlisle United	Rochdale
		Report	Davey 26'	Stadium: Spotland Stadium; Attendance: 2926

26 February 1994 28	Chester City	3–1	Rochdale	Chester
	Pugh 55' (pen.), 75'; Rimmer 80'	Report	Milner 5'	Stadium: Deva Stadium; Attendance: 3475

1 March 1994 29	Rochdale	2–1	Scarborough	Rochdale
	Reid 44'; Stuart 87'	Report	Young 85'	Stadium: Spotland Stadium; Attendance: 1827

5 March 1994 30	Rochdale	1–1	Colchester United	Rochdale
	Stuart 72'	Report	Watts 17'	Stadium: Spotland Stadium; Attendance: 2202

12 March 1994 31	Hereford United	5–1	Rochdale	Hereford
	Pike 34', 88'; Clark 39'; Steele 50'; Anderson 53'	Report	Whitehall 90'	Stadium: Edgar Street; Attendance: 1964

19 March 1994 32	Chesterfield	1–1	Rochdale	Chesterfield
	Moss 79'	Report	Whitehall 53'	Stadium: Saltergate Recreation Ground; Attendance: 3282

26 March 1994 33	Rochdale	0–1	Doncaster Rovers	Rochdale
		Report	Yates 84'	Stadium: Spotland Stadium; Attendance: 2165

2 April 1994 34	Scarborough	2–1	Rochdale	Scarborough
	White 62'; Charles 76'	Report	Thackeray 49'	Stadium: Athletic Ground; Attendance: 1448

4 April 1994 35	Rochdale	2–2	Wycombe Wanderers	Rochdale
	Whitehall 3'; Bowden 75'	Report	Carroll 70'; Garner 89'	Stadium: Spotland Stadium; Attendance: 2575

9 April 1994 36	Northampton Town	1–2	Rochdale	Northampton
	Aldridge 64'	Report	Stuart 43'; Bowden 74'	Stadium: County Ground; Attendance: 3330

12 April 1994 37	Rochdale	1–2	Shrewsbury Town	Rochdale
	Reid 68'	Report	Spink 66'; Walton 89'	Stadium: Spotland Stadium; Attendance: 2402

16 April 1994 38	Mansfield Town	0–1	Rochdale	Mansfield
		Report	Thackeray 59'	Stadium: Field Mill; Attendance: 2362

19 April 1994 39	Wycombe Wanderers	1–1	Rochdale	Wycombe
	Garner 16'	Report	Stuart 72'	Stadium: Adams Park; Attendance: 5266

23 April 1994 40	Rochdale	2–1	Crewe Alexandra	Rochdale
	Stuart 18'; Whitehall 65'	Report	Naylor 51'	Stadium: Spotland Stadium; Attendance: 3096

30 April 1994 41	Bury	0–1	Rochdale	Bury
	Rigby (red card) 84'	Report	Stuart 61'	Stadium: Gigg Lane; Attendance: 3272

7 May 1994 42	Rochdale	2–3	Scunthorpe United	Rochdale
	Reeves 13'; Lancaster 39'	Report	Thornber 15'; Juryeff 17', 68'	Stadium: Spotland Stadium; Attendance: 3118

=== F.A. Cup ===
13 November 1993 1	Chesterfield	0–1	Rochdale	Chesterfield
		Report	Stuart 72' (pen.)	Stadium: Saltergate Recreation Ground; Attendance: 3457

4 December 1993 2	Burnley	4–1	Rochdale	Burnley
	Jones 25' (o.g.); Eyres 42', 72', 88' (pen.); Monington (red card) 53'	Report	Thackeray (red card) 52'; Jones (red card) 53'; Whitehall 78' (pen.)	Stadium: Turf Moor; Attendance: 11388

=== Football League Cup (Coca-Cola Cup) ===
17 August 1993 1	Rochdale	2–0	York City	Rochdale
	Stuart 52'; Flounders 55' (pen.)	Report		Stadium: Spotland Stadium; Attendance: 1952; Referee: PL Wright

24 August 1993 1	York City	0–0 (0–2 agg.)	Rochdale	York
		Report	Doyle (red card) 79'	Stadium: Bootham Crescent; Attendance: 2835; Referee: TE West

21 September 1993 2	Rochdale	1–6	Leicester City	Rochdale
	Carey 5' (o.g.)	Report	Whitlow 37'; Walsh 48'; Thompson 61'; Oldfield 64'; Speedie 85'; Ormondroyd 90'	Stadium: Spotland Stadium; Attendance: 4499; Referee: R Shepherd

6 October 1993 2	Leicester City	2–1 (8–2 agg.)	Rochdale	Leicester
	Ormondroyd 44'; Joachim 76'	Report	Lancaster 6'	Stadium: Filbert Street; Attendance: 7612; Referee: CR Wilkes

=== Football League Trophy (Autoglass Trophy) ===
30 November 1993 2	Stockport County	4–0	Rochdale	Stockport
	Beaumont 34', 59'; Frain 76'; Preece 90'	Report		Stadium: Edgeley Park; Attendance: 2484

=== Lancashire Cup ===
23 July 1993	Rochdale	3–4	Bolton Wanderers	Rochdale
	Thackeray; Flounders; Seagraves (o.g.)		Goal	Stadium: Spotland Stadium

26 July 1993	Blackpool	2–1	Rochdale	Blackpool
	Goal		Bowden	Stadium: Bloomfield Road

31 July 1993	Rochdale	4–1	Burnley	Rochdale
	Stuart; Lancaster; Flounders; Jones		Goal	Stadium: Spotland Stadium
