= 1996–97 Rochdale A.F.C. season =

English football club season

Rochdale
1996–97 season
- Manager: Graham Barrow
- League Division Three: 14th
- FA Cup: 3rd Round
- League Cup: 1st Round
- Top goalscorer: League: Steve Whitehall; Alex Russell; All: Steve Whitehall

The 1996–97 season was Rochdale A.F.C.'s 90th in existence and their 23rd consecutive in the fourth tier of the English football league, named at the time as the Football League Third Division.

== Statistics ==
No.	Pos	Nat	Player	Total		Division 3		F.A. Cup		League Cup		League Trophy		Lancashire Cup	
No.	Pos	Nat	Player	Apps	Goals	Apps	Goals	Apps	Goals	Apps	Goals	Apps	Goals	Apps	Goals
	GK	(England) ENG	Ian Gray	52	0	46+0	0	2+0	0	2+0	0	1+0	0	1+0	0
	DF	(England) ENG	Andy Fensome	47	0	38+2	0	2+0	0	2+0	0	1+0	0	2+0	0
	DF	(England) ENG	Kevin Formby	19	1	12+4	1	2+0	0	1+0	0	0+0	0	0+0	0
	DF	(England) ENG	Alan Johnson	51	5	46+0	4	2+0	1	2+0	0	1+0	0	0+0	0
	DF	(England) ENG	Keith Hill	50	3	43+0	3	2+0	0	2+0	0	1+0	0	2+0	0
	MF	(England) ENG	Andy Farrell	46	2	37+3	2	2+0	0	2+0	0	0+0	0	2+0	0
	MF	(England) ENG	Alex Russell	43	9	35+4	9	0+0	0	2+0	0	1+0	0	0+1	0
	MF	(England) ENG	John Deary	43	7	37+1	5	2+0	1	2+0	1	1+0	0	0+0	0
	FW	(England) ENG	Mark Leonard	44	4	39+0	4	1+0	0	2+0	0	0+0	0	2+0	0
	FW	(England) ENG	Steve Whitehall	41	11	27+8	9	2+0	0	1+0	1	1+0	0	2+0	1
	MF	(England) ENG	Mark Stuart	36	7	28+3	7	1+0	0	2+0	0	0+0	0	2+0	0
	FW	(England) ENG	Mike Cecere	8	1	2+2	1	1+0	0	0+1	0	1+0	0	1+0	0
	MF	(England) ENG	Dean Martin	3	0	0+1	0	0+0	0	0+0	0	0+0	0	2+0	0
	MF	(England) ENG	David Thompson	32	1	9+19	1	0+1	0	0+2	0	0+1	0	0+0	0
	DF	(England) ENG	David Bayliss	28	0	22+2	0	1+0	0	1+0	0	1+0	0	0+1	0
	FW	(England) ENG	Dave Lancaster	8	0	1+5	0	0+0	0	1+0	0	0+0	0	0+1	0
	MF	(England) ENG	Andy Gouck	31	3	22+6	3	1+0	0	0+0	0	0+0	0	2+0	0
	MF	(England) ENG	Mickey Brown	5	0	5+0	0	0+0	0	0+0	0	0+0	0	0+0	0
	FW	(England) ENG	Robbie Painter	30	7	21+6	7	2+0	0	0+0	0	1+0	0	0+0	0
	DF	(England) ENG	Mark Bailey	17	0	13+2	0	1+0	0	0+0	0	1+0	0	0+0	0
	DF	(England) ENG	Andy Thackeray	22	2	17+0	0	0+1	1	0+1	0	0+1	0	1+1	1
	DF	(England) ENG	Wayne Dowell	9	0	6+1	0	0+0	0	0+0	0	0+0	0	2+0	0
	FW	(England) ENG	Glen Robson	3	0	0+3	0	0+0	0	0+0	0	0+0	0	0+0	0
	FW	(England) ENG	Jamie Taylor	1	0	0+1	0	0+0	0	0+0	0	0+0	0	0+0	0
	GK	(England) ENG	Kevin Gray	1	0	0+0	0	0+0	0	0+0	0	0+0	0	1+0	0

== Final League Table ==
Pos	Team	Pld	W	D	L	GF	GA	GD	Pts
12	Scarborough	46	16	15	15	66	69	−3	63
13	Scunthorpe United	46	18	9	19	59	62	−3	63
14	Rochdale	46	14	16	16	58	58	0	58
15	Barnet	46	14	16	16	46	51	−5	58
16	Leyton Orient	46	15	12	19	50	58	−8	57

Rules for classification: In the Football League goals scored (GF) takes precedence over goal difference (GD).

== Competitions ==
=== Football League Third Division ===
17 August 1996 1	Swansea City	2–1	Rochdale	Swansea
	Thomas 13'; Penney 43' (yellow card); Mølby (red card) 75'; Garnett (yellow card)	Report	Cecere 87'; Whitehall (yellow card); Deary (yellow card)	Stadium: Vetch Field; Attendance: 4272

24 August 1996 2	Rochdale	0–0	Colchester United	Rochdale
	Leonard (yellow card)	Report	Reinelt (yellow card); Adcock (yellow card)	Stadium: Spotland Stadium; Attendance: 1816; Referee: G Laws

27 August 1996 3	Rochdale	1–2	Fulham	Rochdale
	Whitehall 80' (yellow card)	Report	Cusack 1'; Conroy 69'; Cockerill (yellow card); Angus (yellow card)	Stadium: Spotland Stadium; Attendance: 1689; Referee: JP Robinson

31 August 1996 4	Mansfield Town	0–0	Rochdale	Mansfield
		Report	Fensome (yellow card)	Stadium: Field Mill; Attendance: 1861

7 September 1996 5	Hull City	1–1	Rochdale	Hull
	Doncel 53' (yellow card); Carroll (yellow card)	Report	Deary 43'	Stadium: Boothferry Park; Attendance: 3451

10 September 1996 6	Rochdale	0–1	Chester City	Rochdale
	Hill (yellow card)	Report	Shelton 74'; Davidson (yellow card)	Stadium: Spotland Stadium; Attendance: 1774; Referee: AG Wiley

14 September 1996 7	Rochdale	2–1	Doncaster Rovers	Rochdale
	Hill (yellow card) (yellow-red card) 14'; Leonard (yellow card) (yellow-red card) 44'; Deary 78' (pen.); Gouck 81'; Brown (yellow card)	Report	Clark 69'; Murphy; Utley (yellow card)	Stadium: Spotland Stadium; Attendance: 1811

21 September 1996 8	Hereford United	3–0	Rochdale	Hereford
	Mahon 28'; Hargreaves 53'; Foster 84' (yellow card); Stoker (yellow card)	Report	Fensome (yellow card); Bayliss (yellow card)	Stadium: Edgar Street; Attendance: 2135

28 September 1996 9	Rochdale	1–0	Leyton Orient	Rochdale
	Whitehall 76' (pen.)	Report	Arnott (yellow card) (yellow-red card) 80'; Naylor (yellow card); Ling (yellow card)	Stadium: Spotland Stadium; Attendance: 1994; Referee: B Coddington

5 October 1996 10	Darlington	1–1	Rochdale	Darlington
	Kelly 69'	Report	Stuart 67'	Stadium: Feethams; Attendance: 3071; Referee: SJ Baines

12 October 1996 11	Rochdale	2–2	Carlisle United	Rochdale
	Painter 7'; Thompson 81'	Report	Smart 27'; Peacock 54'	Stadium: Spotland Stadium; Attendance: 3320

15 October 1996 12	Rochdale	2–0	Lincoln City	Rochdale
	Whitehall 44'; Painter 45'	Report	Ainsworth (yellow card)	Stadium: Spotland Stadium; Attendance: 1411

19 October 1996 13	Cambridge United	2–2	Rochdale	Cambridge
	Hyde 43'; McGleish 88'; Craddock (yellow card); Hyde (yellow card)	Report	Stuart 26'; Painter 72'	Stadium: Abbey Stadium; Attendance: 3163

26 October 1996 14	Scunthorpe United	2–2	Rochdale	Scunthorpe
	Baker 6'; Eyre 32' (pen.); Samways (yellow card); Paterson (yellow card)	Report	Stuart 45' (yellow card); Whitehall 49'	Stadium: Glanford Park; Attendance: 2628

29 October 1996 15	Rochdale	3–0	Brighton & Hove Albion	Rochdale
	Whitehall 31', 56'; Painter 50'; Hill (yellow card)	Report		Stadium: Spotland Stadium; Attendance: 1913; Referee: UD Rennie

2 November 1996 16	Rochdale	2–0	Exeter City	Rochdale
	Hill 13'; Johnson 37'	Report	Richardson (yellow card); Hodges (yellow card); Rowbotham (yellow card)	Stadium: Spotland Stadium; Attendance: 2134; Referee: WC Burns

5 November 1996 17	Cardiff City	2–1	Rochdale	Cardiff
	Bennett 45'; Eckhardt 67'	Report	Whitehall 52'	Stadium: Ninian Park; Attendance: 2834

9 November 1996 18	Barnet	3–2	Rochdale	Chipping Barnet
	Devine 37'; Hardyman 67'; Wilson 78' (pen.)	Report	Pardew 42' (o.g.); Deary 64'	Stadium: Underhill Stadium; Attendance: 2405

23 November 1996 19	Northampton Town	2–2	Rochdale	Northampton
	Hunter 2'; White 69'	Report	Farrell 66', 68'	Stadium: Sixfields Stadium; Attendance: 3836

30 November 1996 20	Rochdale	1–2	Scunthorpe United	Rochdale
	Painter 75'	Report	Baker 18'; Eyre 83'	Stadium: Spotland Stadium; Attendance: 1969; Referee: A Bates

3 December 1996 21	Torquay United	0–1	Rochdale	Torquay
		Report	Johnson 73'	Stadium: Plainmoor; Attendance: 1087; Referee: G Singh

14 December 1996 22	Rochdale	1–3	Hartlepool United	Rochdale
	Whitehall 77'	Report	Beech 41'; Howard 42'; Allon 70'	Stadium: Spotland Stadium; Attendance: 1618

21 December 1996 23	Wigan Athletic	0–1	Rochdale	Wigan
		Report	Whitehall 4' (pen.)	Stadium: Springfield Park; Attendance: 3311; Referee: KM Lynch

14 January 1997 24	Chester City	0–0	Rochdale	Chester
		Report		Stadium: Deva Stadium; Attendance: 1679

18 January 1997 25	Rochdale	1–0	Cardiff City	Rochdale
	Leonard 7'	Report		Stadium: Spotland Stadium; Attendance: 1704; Referee: UD Rennie

25 January 1997 26	Brighton & Hove Albion	3–0	Rochdale	Brighton and Hove
	Maskell 30', 67'; Baird 72'	Report	Bayliss (red card) 57'	Stadium: Goldstone Ground; Attendance: 4468

1 February 1997 27	Rochdale	1–1	Barnet	Rochdale
	Hill (red card) 39'; Russell 90'	Report	Devine (red card) 39'; Simpson 58'	Stadium: Spotland Stadium; Attendance: 1623

4 February 1997 28	Rochdale	3–3	Scarborough	Rochdale
	Painter 40'; Hill 47'; Russell 62'	Report	Brooke 26'; Rockett 64'; Wells (red card) 70'; Bennett 80'	Stadium: Spotland Stadium; Attendance: 1166

8 February 1997 29	Exeter City	0–0	Rochdale	Exeter
		Report		Stadium: St James Park; Attendance: 2849

11 February 1997 30	Leyton Orient	2–1	Rochdale	London
	Inglethorpe 39'; Castle 55'	Report	Painter 33'	Stadium: Brisbane Road; Attendance: 2406; Referee: NS Barry

15 February 1997 31	Rochdale	1–1	Northampton Town	Rochdale
	Deary 44'	Report	Rush 9'	Stadium: Spotland Stadium; Attendance: 1988; Referee: SJ Baines

18 February 1997 32	Rochdale	0–0	Hereford United	Rochdale
		Report		Stadium: Spotland Stadium; Attendance: 1074

22 February 1997 33	Scarborough	2–2	Rochdale	Scarborough
	Bennett 35'; Currie 49' (pen.); Sutherland (yellow card)	Report	Russell 22'; Sutherland 44' (o.g.); Leonard (yellow card); Deary (yellow card); Thompson (yellow card)	Stadium: Athletic Ground; Attendance: 2384

25 February 1997 34	Rochdale	1–2	Hull City	Rochdale
	Russell 5'	Report	Joyce 12'; Darby 71'	Stadium: Spotland Stadium; Attendance: 1349

1 March 1997 35	Rochdale	2–1	Torquay United	Rochdale
	Leonard 6'; Gouck 89' (yellow card)	Report	Nelson 11'	Stadium: Spotland Stadium; Attendance: 1469

8 March 1997 36	Rochdale	3–1	Wigan Athletic	Rochdale
	Deary 15'; Johnson 39'; Russell 45'; Fensome (yellow card); Gouck (yellow card)	Report	Jones 28' (pen.); Sharp (yellow card); Bishop (yellow card); Lancashire (yellow card)	Stadium: Spotland Stadium; Attendance: 3254; Referee: E Lomas

15 March 1997 37	Hartlepool United	1–2	Rochdale	Hartlepool
	Beech 59'	Report	Russell 29'; Formby 50'	Stadium: Victoria Park; Attendance: 1448

21 March 1997 38	Colchester United	1–0	Rochdale	Colchester
	Abrahams 59'	Report	Hill (yellow card); Farrell (yellow card); Deary (yellow card)	Stadium: Layer Road; Attendance: 3211

25 March 1997 39	Doncaster Rovers	3–0	Rochdale	Doncaster
	Hill 23' (o.g.); Cramb 28' (pen.); Esdaille 82'	Report	Fensome (yellow card); Leonard (yellow card)	Stadium: Belle Vue; Attendance: 2201

29 March 1997 40	Rochdale	2–3	Swansea City	Rochdale
	Russell 24', 36'	Report	Mølby 31', 59' (pen.) (yellow card); Brayson 53'; Willer-Jensen (yellow card)	Stadium: Spotland Stadium; Attendance: 1884; Referee: M Fletcher

31 March 1997 41	Fulham	1–1	Rochdale	London
	Conroy 12'	Report	Gouck 36'; Formby (yellow card); Leonard (yellow card)	Stadium: Craven Cottage; Attendance: 7866

5 April 1997 42	Rochdale	0–1	Mansfield Town	Rochdale
	Fensome (yellow card); Formby (yellow card)	Report	Cresswell 59'	Stadium: Spotland Stadium; Attendance: 1620

12 April 1997 43	Rochdale	2–0	Darlington	Rochdale
	Leonard 11'; Johnson 18'	Report		Stadium: Spotland Stadium; Attendance: 1638

26 April 1997 44	Rochdale	3–0	Cambridge United	Rochdale
	Stuart 16', 39'; Russell 43' (yellow card); Thackeray (yellow card); Gray (yellow card)	Report		Stadium: Spotland Stadium; Attendance: 1810

29 April 1997 45	Carlisle United	3–2	Rochdale	Carlisle
	Hayward 73'; Archdeacon 76'; Dobie 79'	Report	Leonard 25'; Stuart 90'; Deary (yellow card); Thompson (yellow card)	Stadium: Brunton Park; Attendance: 4882

3 May 1997 46	Lincoln City	0–2	Rochdale	Lincoln
	Fleming (yellow card)	Report	Hill 77'; Stuart 82'; Leonard (yellow card)	Stadium: Sincil Bank; Attendance: 6495

=== F.A. Cup ===
16 November 1996 1	Macclesfield Town	0–2	Rochdale	Macclesfield
		Report	Deary 10'; Johnson 32'	Stadium: Moss Rose; Attendance: 3134

7 December 1996 2	Notts County	3–1	Rochdale	Nottingham
	Jones 41'; Arkins 68'; Agana 90'; Bayliss (yellow card); Deary (yellow card)	Report	Thackeray 82'	Stadium: Meadow Lane; Attendance: 3584

=== Football League Cup (Coca Cola Cup) ===
20 August 1996 1	Rochdale	2–1	Barnsley	Rochdale
	Deary 61'; Whitehall 74'	Report	Wilkinson 24'	Stadium: Spotland Stadium; Attendance: 2426; Referee: WC Burns

3 September 1996 1	Barnsley	2–0 (3–2 agg.)	Rochdale	Barnsley
	Redfearn 17'; Wilkinson 74'	Report	Johnson (yellow card); Stuart (yellow card)	Stadium: Oakwell; Attendance: 5638; Referee: FG Stretton

=== Football League Trophy (Auto Windscreens Shield) ===
10 December 1996 1	Carlisle United	2–0	Rochdale	Carlisle
	Walling 66'; McAlindon 85'	Report		Stadium: Brunton Park; Attendance: 3622

=== Lancashire Cup ===
30 July 1996	Blackpool	1–1	Rochdale	Blackpool
	Goal		Thackeray	Stadium: Bloomfield Road

3 August 1996	Morecambe	2–1	Rochdale	Morecambe
	Goal		Whitehall	Stadium: Christie Park
