= Simon Thompson =

Simon Thompson may refer to:

- Simon Thompson (businessman)
- Simon Thompson (footballer) a Scarborough F.C. player
- Simon Thompson (make-up artist)
- Simon Thompson (professor)
- Simon Thompson (Royal Mail), CEO of Royal Mail
- Simon Thompson (triathlete)

== See also ==
- Simone Thompson (born 1996), American model known as Slick Woods
