= History of Rotherham United F.C. =

History of an English football club

The first Rotherham United kit (1925)

The history of Rotherham United F.C. traces its roots back to 1870. The club originated as Thornhill Football Club (later Thornhill United) in 1870. Rotherham United was eventually formed 55 years later, in 1925.

== 1870-1925 ==
For many years the leading team in the area was Rotherham Town F.C., who spent three seasons in the Football League while Thornhill United were still playing in the Sheffield & Hallamshire League. By the turn of the century, however, Rotherham Town had resigned from the Football League and gone out of business; a new club of the same name later joined the Midland League. Meanwhile, Thornhill's fortunes were on the rise to the extent that in 1905 they laid claim to being the pre-eminent club in the town and changed their name to Rotherham County For a period both clubs competed in the Midland League, finishing first and second in 1911–12. When the Football League was resumed in 1919, Rotherham County applied successfully to join for the first time while Rotherham Town's application was turned down but they were allowed back into the Midland League. The first league game took place at Millmoor and Rotherham County beat Nottingham Forest 2–0 but it proved to be a season of struggle and they finished in 17th position out of 22. When it was decided to introduce Division Three, Town were hopeful of becoming Rotherham's second League club but they received just 13 votes, not enough to gain admittance.

== Formation of Rotherham United (1925) ==
The Second Division was rather too tough for the Yorkshire side and in 1923 they were relegated to Division Three (North) after a final-day single-goal defeat at Blackpool. In 1925 the club finished bottom and had to apply for re-election. Rotherham Town were themselves struggling and it was clear that to have two professional clubs in the town was not sustainable. Talks had begun in February 1925 and in early May the two clubs merged to form Rotherham United. Days later the reformed club was formally re-elected under its new name.

In a new amber and black strip, United may have begun with optimism but the new club fared little better than the old one. The now familiar red and white was adopted around 1928 but there was no improvement in the club's fortunes: in 1931 they again had to apply for re-election. Immediately after the Second World War things looked up. After adopting Arsenal-style white sleeved shirts, United finished as runners-up three time in succession between 1947 and 1949 and then were champions of Division Three (North) in 1951.

Rotherham reached their highest ever league position of third in the Football League Second Division in 1955, when only goal average denied them a place in the top flight after they finished level on points with champions Birmingham City and runners-up Luton Town. During Rotherham’s 19-year stay in the Second Division, they frequently competed with the likes of Aston Villa, Chelsea, Everton, Leeds United, Manchester City and Newcastle United.

The club held on to its place in the Second Division until 1968, under the management of Tommy Docherty, and dropped into the Fourth Division for the first time in 1973. In 1975 they were promoted back to the Third Division after finishing third, achieving their first promotion for 24 years.

== 1981–1989 ==
The Millers won the division three title in 1981. Not only did the Millers pip one of their neighbours, Barnsley, to the championship but the double they recorded over Sheffield United helped send them tumbling into the fourth division.

Rotherham had a dismal first half of the 1981–82 season but a surge after the turn of 1982 saw them emerge as surprise promotion contenders for the first time in nearly 30 years. This was the first season of 3 points for a win rather than 2 in the league, and in the end they missed out on promotion by a mere 4 points by finishing seventh. They have not finished this high ever since.

The highlights of this campaign were their two meetings with Chelsea. Firstly the Millers thrashed the Londoners 6–0 at Millmoor before triumphing 4–1 at Stamford Bridge in the return in front of 11,900 fans.

This team, which included the attacking talents of John Seasman, Tony Towner, Rodney Fern and Ronnie Moore could not maintain this level of performance, however, although it was something of a surprise to see them relegated again the very next year.

By 1988, United were relegated to the Fourth Division but were promoted a year later as champions.

== 1990–2004 ==
During the 1990s Rotherham were promoted and relegated between the Football League's lowest two divisions with some regularity. They slipped into the Fourth Division in 1991, just two years after being promoted, but reclaimed their status in the third tier (renamed Division Two for the 1992–93 season due to the launch of the FA Premier League) by finishing third in the Fourth Division in 1992. They survived at this level for five years, never looking like promotion contenders, before being relegated in 1997.

However, in 1996, Rotherham made their first trip to Wembley, beating Shrewsbury 2–1 to win the Football League Trophy.

In 1997, just after relegation to Division Three, one of the club's most successful players Ronnie Moore took charge of Rotherham United and became the club's most successful manager. His first season ended in a mid-table finish and then his second in a play-off semi final defeat on penalties to Leyton Orient. In 1999–2000 as Rotherham finished as Division Three runners-up and gained promotion to Division Two. They were favourites to be relegated in 2000–01 season, but finished as runners-up in Division Two and gained a second successive promotion to Division One. They beat Brentford at a sold out Millmoor 2–1 with Alan Lee scoring the winning goal in the last seconds of the game. During this successful campaign, Rotherham also beat Premiership side Southampton in the FA Cup.

Rotherham remained in Division One for four seasons, their most successful of which was the 2002–03 campaign. The Millers were in contention for a play-off place, but dropped off near the season's end to finish 15th, their lowest position all season. During their time in the Championship they had some historic wins including two wins against Sheffield Wednesday at Hillsborough, a home win against West Ham United. When the Millers sold Alan Lee to Cardiff City and struggled without the Irish international's goals, finishing 17th. A highlight of the season was a 1–1 draw with Arsenal in the League Cup at Highbury.

== 2004–2008 ==
During the 2004–05 season, the club spent most of the season bottom of the league and the club was bought by a supporter-led group named Millers 05 Ltd. Rotherham were eventually relegated that season. Ronnie Moore resigned during the relegation campaign. Mick Harford took over as Millers manager, but was sacked after a run of 17 games without a win to be replaced by Alan Knill. Early in 2006 it was announced that the club faced an uncertain future unless a funding gap in the region of £140,000 per month could be plugged. The problem was compounded as Rotherham had already sold their ground to Ken Booth in return for clearing £3 million of debt and had no tangible assets, so administration was not a viable option. This led to the launch of a "Save Our Millers" campaign, aiming to raise the £1 million needed to complete the season. It was also estimated that another £1 million was required to complete work on the new stand. South Yorkshire neighbours Sheffield United offered their support by paying the wages of Stephen Quinn and Jonathan Forte during their loan spells at Millmoor, and also donated profits from the beam-back of the Sheffield derby. Many local clubs also held collections.

An eleventh-hour intervention by a consortium of local businessmen offering substantial investment and a new business plan averted a possible dissolution of the club. Denis Coleman took over as Rotherham United chairman, and made an immediate positive impact.

The final match of the 2005–06 season, home to MK Dons, was a winner-take-all relegation showdown. A scoreless draw, combined with a Hartlepool United draw with Port Vale, kept Rotherham up and consigned both MK Dons and Hartlepool to the drop. However, Rotherham were to start the following season with a penalty of minus 10 points as a result of their financial troubles.

Rotherham United began their second successive year in League One with a 10-point deficit as a result of the CVA which saved the club from liquidation. At one point during the close season, the team had only seven full-time professionals on the books but Knill made a number of signings during this period to bolster the squad including former Liverpool winger Richie Partridge, ex-Premiership players Delroy Facey and Martin Woods, former Bayern Munich and Nottingham Forest star Eugen Bopp and many others who have played at a higher level.

On 16 September, after three wins and two draws in their first nine games, Rotherham gained their first point in the league. They moved off the bottom of the table on 14 October, and after a run of three successive victories they moved out of the relegation zone after a 5–1 win against Crewe Alexandra on 28 October. After winning every league game in October, Knill was awarded the Manager of the Month and Yorkshire Manager of the Year awards.

At the arrival of the January transfer window, Knill sold stars Lee Williamson and Will Hoskins to Premiership side Watford for a combined fee in the ranges of £1.2 million. However, losing their two best players took its toll on the Millers, who sunk back to the bottom of the table after winning only one match in three months. By the end of February, the Millers sat 13 points adrift of safety, making the threat of relegation almost inevitable. This resulted in Knill being sacked on 1 March, with Mark Robins becoming caretaker manager. Robins's position was made permanent on 6 April 2007, but he was not able to save Rotherham from relegation.

The Millers spent the majority of the 2007–08 season in the automatic promotion places, winning eight consecutive league matches towards the end of the year. However, in mid-March 2008 it was revealed that Rotherham had again entered administration and would be deducted 10 points. This was accompanied by a drop in form and Rotherham finished ninth in the league. Towards the end of the season, it was revealed that local businessman Tony Stewart was to take over as chairman and club owner, but was advised not to exit administration via a CVA, meaning an additional points deduction for the following season.

On 6 August, three days before the start of the season, the Football League threatened to block Rotherham (as well as Bournemouth) from participating in League Two for the 2008–09 season, because the club had not yet exited administration or completed the process of transferring ownership. The Football League ruled that accepting the 17-point deduction would be a condition the team must obey to be eligible to play, which was accepted.

In addition, Rotherham United were forced to leave Millmoor, their home of over 100 years, after disputes with the landlords. Being further into debt, Rotherham also sold their training ground at Hooten Roberts and now train at Doncaster Rovers' Keepmoat Stadium renting out one of their pitches.

This led to further complications after the Football League demanded a £750,000 bond for the team to play outside of the Town's boundaries for a maximum of four years. The club must move back to Rotherham within this period, or face losing their Football League share.

== 2008–2009 ==
Under the new ownership of Tony Stewart, Rotherham won their first game of the 2008–09 season at the Don Valley stadium with a 1–0 win against Lincoln City.

The Millers had an impressive season under new ownership, quickly wiping out the point deficit and being in contention for a play-off place until very late in the season. Rotherham were also involved in two cup runs, reaching the Football League Trophy Northern Final, and the League Cup last 16. This included victories over higher league opposition in the form of Wolverhampton Wanderers, Southampton, Sheffield Wednesday, Leicester City and Leeds United.

Despite losing top scorer Reuben Reid to West Bromwich Albion, Mark Robins kept the majority of the team together from the 2008–09 campaign whilst bolstering his squad with the signings of Tom Pope, Adam Le Fondre, Nicky Law, Jamie Annerson, Paul Warne, Andy Liddell and Kevin Ellison.

The Millers continued their good run of form into the season, winning 3 of their first 4 games, before beating Derby County in the cup. The next week saw the Millers close to completing another giant killing narrowly losing 4–3 to West Brom after extra time and being knocked out of the Football League Trophy at the hands of Huddersfield Town.

It was announced that Mark Robins was in talks with the Millers' South Yorkshire neighbours Barnsley on 3 September. Following this announcement, Chairman Tony Stewart relieved Robins of his managerial duties, placing him on 'Gardening Leave'. Assistant manager John Breckin took charge of the team overseeing their 3–1 win over Chesterfield, moving the Millers to top of the league. However, that evening Barnsley FC requested to speak with Breckin, along with first-team coach Steve Taylor and fitness coach Nick Daws, with regards to following Mark Robins to Oakwell. All 3 accepted, and were subsequently placed on gardening leave along with Robins. An announcement was set to be made at 2.15 pm on Monday 7 September to unveil Robins as the new manager of Barnsley, however talks stalled due to a disagreement over compensation. Mark finally left the millers on Wednesday 9 September, having signed a contract with Barnsley the previous evening, leaving Steve Thornber in temporary charge. The Millers drew their first two matches under Thornber's charge.

== 2010–present ==
Ronnie Moore was reappointed manager at a press conference on 25 September 2009. Jimmy Mullen was later confirmed as his assistant. Moore was previously a player and later the manager of the club, taking them from the third to first division and established them there for four years.

In January 2010 it was announced that the Guest And Chrimes site had been purchased and would be the new home of the club within two years with a new 12,021-seat stadium.

In March 2011, following poor form, Moore left Rotherham by mutual consent, and Andy Scott replaced him until he was sacked in March 2012. Steve Evans succeeded him, in the first season at the New York Stadium, and won promotion by finishing second in League Two. In the 2013–14 League One season, Rotherham gained a place in the League One play-offs, where they defeated Preston North End in the semi-finals to set up a second play-off final at Wembley Stadium in four years. In the final against Leyton Orient, the game went to a penalty shoot-out, where two saves from Adam Collin secured a second successive promotion for the club.

In the 2014–15 Championship season, Rotherham's first after a nine-year absence, their survival was jeopardised by a points deduction for fielding the ineligible Farrend Rawson during their home win against Brighton & Hove Albion, Farrend Rawson's loan had expired two days prior to the match, and despite the club insisting it was an external administrative error, they were subsequently thrown back into a relegation battle with Wigan Athletic and Millwall. but safety was secured in the penultimate game of the season, a 2–1 home victory against Reading. Rotherham sold key players from their promotion winning campaigns before the 2015–16 season, including Ben Pringle, Craig Morgan and Kari Arnason. Evans left the club in September and former Leeds United manager Neil Redfearn was appointed as his replacement, being sacked in February 2016 after a run of six defeats in eight games. Neil Warnock was appointed as manager for the rest of the season, and the club stayed up, finishing 21st. Warnock left the club in May 2016 after not agreeing a contract extension. Alan Stubbs became the new Rotherham boss in June 2016, His first win came on 20 August 2016, with Danny Ward scoring the only goal in a 1–0 win over Brentford. but was sacked in October. Rotherham replaced Stubbs with Kenny Jackett, who himself was replaced with Paul Warne, as Rotherham finished the season bottom of the league and were relegated to League One. At the first attempt, Rotherham returned to the Championship, defeating Shrewsbury in the play-off final. Unfortunately after a 2–1 defeat by West Brom, they were once again relegated to League One.

The Millers were eventually promoted through points per game in second place behind Coventry City due to discruption from the COVID-19 pandemic. Their return to the Championship was one which fans watched from home due to the persistence of the pandemic. However, despite the best efforts of the Millers, Rotherham would be relegated. Rotherham took the season to the final day where a victory would see them survive if Sheffield Wednesday and Derby County drew with each other. The draw did indeed occur, but Rotherham suffered an 88th minute equaliser against Cardiff City, which was enough to keep Derby in the Championship and Rotherham to be relegated to League One for the 2021–22 season. In the 2021–22 season, the Millers were promoted back to the Championship as runners-up, defeating Gillingham 2–0 on the final day of the season. The club also won the 2021–22 EFL Trophy at Wembley Stadium after defeating Sutton United 4–2 after extra time. Early in the 2022–23 season, manager Paul Warne departed for Derby County, being replaced by Exeter City boss Matt Taylor. At the end of the 2023–24 season, Rotherham were relegated back to League One.
