= Scott Sloan =

Scott Sloan may refer to:

- Scott Sloan (Doonesbury), a character in the comic strip Doonesbury
- Scott Sloan (footballer) (born 1967), retired English footballer
- Scott W. Sloan (1954–2019), professor of civil engineering at the University of Newcastle, Australia
- A. Scott Sloan (1820–1895), United States Representative from Wisconsin
