= 1995–96 Manchester United F.C. season =

English football club season

Manchester United
1995–96 season
- Chairman: Martin Edwards
- Manager: Alex Ferguson
- FA Premier League: 1st
- FA Cup: Winners
- League Cup: Second round
- UEFA Cup: First round
- Top goalscorer: League: Eric Cantona (14); All: Eric Cantona (19)
- Highest home attendance: 53,926 vs Nottingham Forest (28 April 1996)
- Lowest home attendance: 31,966 vs West Ham United (23 August 1995)
- Average home league attendance: 41,681
Home colours	Away colours	Third colours

The 1995–96 season was Manchester United's fourth season in the FA Premier League, and their 21st consecutive season in the top division of English football. United finished the season by becoming the first English team to win the Double (league title and FA Cup) twice. Their triumph was made all the more remarkable by the fact that Alex Ferguson had sold experienced players Paul Ince, Mark Hughes and Andrei Kanchelskis before the start of the season, and not made any major signings. Instead, he had drafted in young players like Nicky Butt, David Beckham, Paul Scholes and the Neville brothers, Gary and Phil.

Eric Cantona returned from his eight-month suspension at the beginning of October, and finished the season as the club's top scorer with 19 goals in all competitions, the last one being the winner against Liverpool in the FA Cup final. He also picked up a Premier League winner's medal and the FWA Player of the Year award. The Premier League title was sealed on the final day of the season with a 3–0 win at Bryan Robson's Middlesbrough.

== Season overview ==
Having started the season without a major summer signing, the critics were ready to pounce on United, and made no apologies for writing United's chances of success off as they lost their first game of the season 3–1 at Aston Villa, a side who, by contrast, had spent heavily on players in recent months after a difficult period of transition. United hit back by winning their next five league games and were soon second to Newcastle United, spearheaded by multimillion-pound new signings Les Ferdinand and David Ginola. They actually went top of the league after a goalless draw at Sheffield Wednesday towards the end of September, only for the Tynesiders to return to the top of the table soon after. Then came Cantona's comeback on 1 October, when he scored a penalty to equalise and hold Liverpool to a 2–2 draw at Old Trafford.

The autumn saw United suffer first-hurdle exits to York City in the League Cup and Rotor Volgograd in the UEFA Cup, although United did preserve their 39-year home unbeaten record in European competitions thanks to a late equaliser by goalkeeper Peter Schmeichel in the second leg of the European tie. On the domestic scene, the 3–0 defeat they suffered at home to the Division Two strugglers in the first leg of the League Cup second round was their only home defeat of the season. A 3–1 win in the return leg at Bootham Crescent was not enough and United suffered a humiliating exit, although at least these disappointments meant that United only had the league to concentrate on until after Christmas, unlike some of their fellow title contenders.

United remained unbeaten throughout October and November, although they remained second behind Newcastle in the league. Then came a five match winless run which saw them 10 points behind Newcastle by Christmas. On 27 December, they hosted Newcastle at Old Trafford and won 2–0, with one of the goals coming from Andy Cole, the former Newcastle goal machine who had arrived at Old Trafford the previous winter, and the gap was down to seven points. A 2–1 win over QPR briefly cut the gap to four points. Making his debut in that game was French defender William Prunier signed on a trial contract following an injury to Gary Pallister. Prunier also appeared in the United team at Tottenham on New Year's Day, but United crashed 4–1 at White Hart Lane and Prunier was soon gone. United's title hopes appeared to be fading, and when they went 2–1 down at Old Trafford in the FA Cup third round to Division One promotion challengers Sunderland, it looked as though this season could prove to be another trophyless season for United. But an Eric Cantona equaliser with 10 minutes remaining forced a replay at Roker Park, where Sunderland once again took the lead before United finally won 2–1. There was more frustration in the league as United's second league game of 1996 saw them draw 0–0 at home to Aston Villa. The last league game of the month was won 1–0 at West Ham, and then came an easy 3–0 win over Reading in the FA Cup fourth round at Elm Park.

United narrowed the gap between themselves and leaders Newcastle once again in February, winning all four of their league games that month. A 4–2 away win over Wimbledon was followed by a home clash with Blackburn, who were mid-table in a disappointing defence of their league title. Lee Sharpe was on the scoresheet as United won 1–0, and their next game was a 2–0 home win over Everton. The month was completed with a 6–0 away win over Bolton, which pushed their hosts closer to eventual relegation but also gave United's goal difference a major boost as well as putting United just four points behind Newcastle. United had also defeated Manchester City 2–1 in the FA Cup fifth round at Old Trafford, and so a unique second double was suddenly looking like a very serious possibility.

March began with a visit to Tyneside, for what was billed by many as the title decider. United kept their hosts, who had yet to drop points at home, at bay in the first half of the game, thanks largely to the goalkeeping heroics of Schmeichel. The deadlock was finally broken in the second half with a Cantona goal, and the gap was now down to a single point. United briefly went top the following weekend with a 1–1 draw at struggling QPR, and after another Cantona goal gave them a 1–0 home win over Arsenal on 20 March, United went top of the table and stayed there for the rest of the season.

The title race went down to the wire, but United went into the last game of the season knowing that a draw at Middlesbrough would give them the title, and Newcastle needed to beat Tottenham to have any chance of depriving them of title glory. A 3–0 victory gave United the title, and the following Saturday they triumphed 1–0 over Liverpool in the FA Cup final, with a late goal from Cantona (already voted FWA Player of the Year) making them the first team to win the double twice.

Veteran defenders Steve Bruce and Paul Parker moved on at the end of the season, as did goalkeeper Tony Coton, who had only joined the club in January and never played a first team game. As the season drew to a close, speculation mounted that United would sign a world-class striker – possibly Alan Shearer – to partner Eric Cantona in the bid to bring the European Cup to Old Trafford.

The season also produced one of the most infamous moments in football shirt history, when United changed their kits at half-time during their away defeat to Southampton, with Alex Ferguson stating that it was because he felt the kit left players unable to spot each other on the pitch, as well as the fact that United had not won a single of their five games played wearing the kit.

== Pre-season and friendlies ==
Date	Opponents	H / A	Result F–A	Scorers	Attendance
31 July 1995	Selangor	A	4–1	Bruce, Butt, Pallister, Sharpe	50,000
2 August 1995	Selangor	A	2–0	Bruce, Scholes	20,000
7 August 1995	Birmingham City	A	0–1		13,330
9 August 1995	Bradford City	A	1–0	Keane	13,457
11 August 1995	Shelbourne	A	2–2	Butt, Beckham	12,500
13 August 1995	East Fife	A	4–0	Beckham (2), McClair, Sharpe	5,385
15 August 1995	Oldham Athletic	A	2–0	Sharpe, Jobson (o.g.)	8,766
5 December 1995	International Select	N	1–2	Scholes	22,000
12 December 1995	Celtic	A	1–3	Scholes	37,306

== FA Premier League ==
Manchester United opened the 1995–96 season with a 3–1 defeat away to Aston Villa, after which their young team was written off by all the media, most famously by Alan Hansen who claimed "you can't win anything with kids". The younger players were partnered with veterans like Steve Bruce, Roy Keane and Peter Schmeichel, and began to look a convincing outfit, particularly after a 2–1 win away to defending champions Blackburn Rovers. A 1–0 defeat at Arsenal was only their second league defeat of the campaign, but in the run-up to Christmas they endured a five-match winless run which left Newcastle United looking uncatchable with a 10-point lead. A 2–0 home win over the Tynesiders on 27 December cut the gap to seven points, but it widened again on New Year's Day when United were crushed 4–1 at Tottenham Hotspur.

United then went on a strong run of form which saw the gap between themselves and Newcastle cut to four points by the end of February, and on 4 March they won 1–0 at Newcastle to cut the gap to a single point. They went top of the league soon afterwards and went into the final game of the season at Middlesbrough only needing a point to put the title beyond all doubt. United sealed their third league title in four seasons by beating the Teessiders 3–0.

Date	Opponents	H / A	Result F–A	Scorers	Attendance	League position
19 August 1995	Aston Villa	A	1–3	Beckham 84'	34,655	19th
23 August 1995	West Ham United	H	2–1	Scholes 50', Keane 68'	31,966	5th
26 August 1995	Wimbledon	H	3–1	Keane (2) 28', 80', Cole 60'	32,226	4th
28 August 1995	Blackburn Rovers	A	2–1	Sharpe 46', Beckham 67'	29,843	2nd
9 September 1995	Everton	A	3–2	Sharpe (2) 3', 49', Giggs 74'	39,496	2nd
16 September 1995	Bolton Wanderers	H	3–0	Scholes (2) 18', 86', Giggs 34'	32,812	2nd
23 September 1995	Sheffield Wednesday	A	0–0		34,101	3rd
1 October 1995	Liverpool	H	2–2	Butt 2', Cantona 71' (pen.)	34,934	3rd
14 October 1995	Manchester City	H	1–0	Scholes 5'	35,707	2nd
21 October 1995	Chelsea	A	4–1	Scholes (2) 4', 10', Giggs 78', McClair 85'	31,019	2nd
28 October 1995	Middlesbrough	H	2–0	Pallister 44', Cole 88'	36,580	2nd
4 November 1995	Arsenal	A	0–1		38,317	2nd
18 November 1995	Southampton	H	4–1	Giggs (2) 1', 4', Scholes 9', Cole 69'	39,301	2nd
22 November 1995	Coventry City	A	4–0	Irwin 28', McClair (2) 48', 76', Beckham 58'	23,400	2nd
27 November 1995	Nottingham Forest	A	1–1	Cantona 67' (pen.)	29,263	2nd
2 December 1995	Chelsea	H	1–1	Beckham 61'	42,019	2nd
9 December 1995	Sheffield Wednesday	H	2–2	Cantona (2) 18', 84'	41,849	2nd
17 December 1995	Liverpool	A	0–2		40,546	2nd
24 December 1995	Leeds United	A	1–3	Cole 30'	39,801	2nd
27 December 1995	Newcastle United	H	2–0	Cole 6', Keane 53'	42,024	2nd
30 December 1995	Queens Park Rangers	H	2–1	Cole 45', Giggs 52'	41,890	2nd
1 January 1996	Tottenham Hotspur	A	1–4	Cole 36'	32,852	2nd
13 January 1996	Aston Villa	H	0–0		42,667	3rd
22 January 1996	West Ham United	A	1–0	Cantona 9'	24,197	2nd
3 February 1996	Wimbledon	A	4–2	Cole 41', Perry 45' (o.g.), Cantona (2) 71', 81' (pen.)	25,380	2nd
10 February 1996	Blackburn Rovers	H	1–0	Sharpe 15'	42,681	2nd
21 February 1996	Everton	H	2–0	Keane 30', Giggs 82'	42,459	2nd
25 February 1996	Bolton Wanderers	A	6–0	Beckham 5', Bruce 15', Cole 70', Scholes (2) 76', 79', Butt 90'	21,381	2nd
4 March 1996	Newcastle United	A	1–0	Cantona 52'	36,584	2nd
16 March 1996	Queens Park Rangers	A	1–1	Cantona 90'	18,817	2nd
20 March 1996	Arsenal	H	1–0	Cantona 65'	50,028	1st
24 March 1996	Tottenham Hotspur	H	1–0	Cantona 51'	50,157	1st
6 April 1996	Manchester City	A	3–2	Cantona 7' (pen.), Cole 42', Giggs 78'	29,668	1st
8 April 1996	Coventry City	H	1–0	Cantona 47'	50,332	1st
13 April 1996	Southampton	A	1–3	Giggs 89'	15,262	1st
17 April 1996	Leeds United	H	1–0	Keane 72'	48,382	1st
28 April 1996	Nottingham Forest	H	5–0	Scholes 42', Beckham (2) 45', 55', Giggs 70', Cantona 90'	53,926	1st
5 May 1996	Middlesbrough	A	3–0	May 14', Cole 54', Giggs 81'	29,921	1st

Pos	Team	Pld	W	D	L	GF	GA	GD	Pts	Qualification or relegation
1	Manchester United (C)	38	25	7	6	73	35	+38	82	Qualification for the Champions League group stage
2	Newcastle United	38	24	6	8	66	37	+29	78	Qualification for the UEFA Cup first round
3	Liverpool	38	20	11	7	70	34	+36	71	Qualification for the Cup Winners' Cup first round (Note: Liverpool qualified for the Cup Winners' Cup as FA Cup runners-up, as winners Manchester United already qualified for the Champions League. They defaulted their UEFA Cup spot from league position to Arsenal.)
4	Aston Villa	38	18	9	11	52	35	+17	63	Qualification for the UEFA Cup first round
5	Arsenal	38	17	12	9	49	32	+17	63	Qualification for the UEFA Cup first round

Source: Premier League
Rules for classification: 1) points; 2) goal difference; 3) number of goals scored.
(C) Champions

== FA Cup ==
United won the FA Cup by beating Liverpool 1–0 in the final at Wembley Stadium, with the only goal coming from Eric Cantona in the 85th minute. On the way to the final, Manchester United defeated Sunderland, Reading, Manchester City, Southampton and Chelsea.

Date	Round	Opponents	H / A	Result F–A	Scorers	Attendance
6 January 1996	Round 3	Sunderland	H	2–2	Butt 13', Cantona 80'	41,563
16 January 1996	Round 3 Replay	Sunderland	A	2–1	Scholes 70', Cole 90'	21,378
27 January 1996	Round 4	Reading	A	3–0	Giggs 37', Parker 57', Cantona 90'	14,780
18 February 1996	Round 5	Manchester City	H	2–1	Cantona 39' (pen.), Sharpe 78'	42,692
11 March 1996	Round 6	Southampton	H	2–0	Cantona 49', Sharpe 90'	45,446
31 March 1996	Semi-final	Chelsea	N	2–1	Cole 55', Beckham 59'	38,421
11 May 1996	Final	Liverpool	N	1–0	Cantona 86'	79,007

== League Cup ==
As in the previous seasons, United rested many of their first-team players in the League Cup, instead using the competition to provide first team experience to the club's younger players and reserves. This proved to be a bad move, as the Red Devils fell at the first hurdle, losing in the Second Round to Second Division side York City, 4–3 on aggregate.

Date	Round	Opponents	H / A	Result F–A	Scorers	Attendance
20 September 1995	Round 2 First leg	York City	H	0–3		29,049
3 October 1995	Round 2 Second leg	York City	A	3–1	Scholes (2) 7', 80', Cooke 14'	9,386

== UEFA Cup ==
Date	Round	Opponents	H / A	Result F–A	Scorers	Attendance
12 September 1995	Round 1 First leg	Rotor Volgograd	A	0–0		33,000
26 September 1995	Round 1 Second leg	Rotor Volgograd	H	2–2	Scholes 60', Schmeichel 89'	29,724

== Squad statistics ==
No.	Pos.	Name	League		FA Cup		League Cup		Europe		Total	
No.	Pos.	Name	Apps	Goals	Apps	Goals	Apps	Goals	Apps	Goals	Apps	Goals
1	GK	(Denmark) Peter Schmeichel	36	0	6	0	1	0	2	1	45	1
2	DF	(England) Paul Parker	5(1)	0	1(1)	1	1	0	0(1)	0	7(3)	1
3	DF	(Republic of Ireland) Denis Irwin	31	1	6	0	1	0	1	0	39	1
4	DF	(England) Steve Bruce (c)	30	1	5	0	1(1)	0	2	0	38(1)	1
5	MF	(England) Lee Sharpe	21(10)	4	4(2)	2	2	0	2	0	29(12)	6
6	DF	(England) Gary Pallister	21	1	3	0	2	0	2	0	28	1
7	FW	(France) Eric Cantona	30	14	7	5	1	0	0	0	38	19
9	MF	(Scotland) Brian McClair	12(10)	3	0	0	1	0	0	0	13(10)	3
11	MF	(Wales) Ryan Giggs	30(3)	11	7	1	2	0	2	0	41(3)	12
12	DF	(England) David May	11(5)	1	2	0	0	0	0	0	13(5)	1
13	GK	(England) Tony Coton	0	0	0	0	0	0	0	0	0	0
15	FW	(England) Graeme Tomlinson	0	0	0	0	0	0	0	0	0	0
16	MF	(Republic of Ireland) Roy Keane	29	6	7	0	0(1)	0	2	0	38(1)	6
17	FW	(England) Andy Cole	32(2)	11	7	2	1	0	1	0	42(2)	13
18	MF	(Wales) Simon Davies	1(5)	0	0	0	1	0	0(1)	0	2(6)	0
19	MF	(England) Nicky Butt	31(1)	2	7	1	0	0	2	0	40(1)	3
20	DF	(England) Gary Neville	30(1)	0	5(1)	0	1	0	1	0	37(2)	0
21	DF	(Northern Ireland) Pat McGibbon	0	0	0	0	1	0	0	0	1	0
22	MF	(England) Paul Scholes	16(10)	10	0(2)	1	1	2	1(1)	1	18(13)	14
23	DF	(England) Phil Neville	21(3)	0	6(1)	0	1(1)	0	1	0	29(5)	0
24	MF	(England) David Beckham	26(7)	7	3	1	2	0	2	0	33(7)	8
25	GK	(England) Kevin Pilkington	2(1)	0	1	0	1	0	0	0	4(1)	0
26	DF	(England) Chris Casper	0	0	0	0	0	0	0	0	0	0
27	MF	(England) Terry Cooke	1(3)	0	0	0	1(1)	1	0(1)	0	2(5)	1
29	MF	(England) Ben Thornley	0(1)	0	0	0	0	0	0	0	0(1)	0
30	DF	(England) John O'Kane	0(1)	0	0	0	0	0	1	0	1(1)	0
31	DF	(France) William Prunier	2	0	0	0	0	0	0	0	2	0

== Transfers ==
United's first departure of the 1995–96 season was Matthew Barrass, who joined San Diego Nomads on 1 July. A day later, David Gardner was released, Paul Heckingbottom joined Sunderland, Patrick Lee joined Middlesbrough, and Paul Lyons joined Rochdale. Richard Irving signed for Nottingham Forest on 19 July, while a week later, Ashley Westwood departed for Crewe Alexandra. Gary Walsh signed for Middlesbrough on 11 August, Andrei Kanchelskis joined Everton, while in late September, Elliott Dickman joined Sunderland, and Stephen Hall was released. John Hudson was released on 5 November.

United's only summer arrival of the 1995–96 season was Nick Culkin, who signed from York City on 25 September.

United's only winter departure was Matthew Wicks, who joined Arsenal on a free transfer on 23 January. Former captain Steve Bruce left for Birmingham City on 22 May, while on 30 June, Dessie Baker, Daniel Hall, Paul Parker, and Phillip Whittam left the club.

United's only winter arrival was Tony Coton, who signed from United's rivals Manchester City on 31 January. Raimond van der Gouw joined United from Dutch club Vitesse on 25 June 1996.

=== In ===
Date	Pos.	Name	From	Fee
25 September 1995	GK	(England) Nick Culkin	(England) York City	£250k
31 January 1996	GK	(England) Tony Coton	(England) Manchester City	£500k
25 June 1996	GK	(Netherlands) Raimond van der Gouw	(Netherlands) Vitesse	Free

=== Out ===
Date	Pos.	Name	To	Fee
1 July 1995	MF	(England) Matthew Barrass	(United States) San Diego Nomads	Free
2 July 1995	MF	(England) David Gardner	Released	Free
2 July 1995	DF	(England) Paul Heckingbottom	(England) Sunderland	Free
2 July 1995	MF	(Republic of Ireland) Patrick Lee	(England) Middlesbrough	Free
2 July 1995	MF	(England) Paul Lyons	(England) Rochdale	Free
19 July 1995	FW	(England) Richard Irving	(England) Nottingham Forest	£75k
26 July 1995	DF	(England) Ashley Westwood	(England) Crewe Alexandra	£40k
11 August 1995	GK	(England) Gary Walsh	(England) Middlesbrough	£250k
25 August 1995	MF	(Russia) Andrei Kanchelskis	(England) Everton	£5m
27 September 1995	DF	(England) Elliott Dickman	(England) Sunderland	Free
30 September 1995	FW	(England) Stephen Hall	Released	Free
5 November 1995	MF	(England) John Hudson	Released	Free
23 January 1996	DF	(England) Matt Wicks	(England) Arsenal	Free
22 May 1996	DF	(England) Steve Bruce	(England) Birmingham City	Free
30 June 1996	FW	(Republic of Ireland) Dessie Baker	Released	Free
30 June 1996	DF	(England) Daniel Hall	Released	Free
30 June 1996	DF	(England) Paul Parker	(England) Derby County	Free
30 June 1996	DF	(England) Phillip Whittam	Released	Free

=== Loan in ===
Date from	Date to	Pos.	Name	From
29 December 1995	1 March 1996	DF	(France) William Prunier	(France) Bordeaux

=== Loan out ===
Date from	Date to	Pos.	Name	To
1 July 1995	1 August 1995	MF	(England) Michael Appleton	(England) Wimbledon
15 September 1995	15 October 1995	MF	(England) Michael Appleton	(England) Lincoln City
6 November 1995	15 February 1996	MF	(England) Ben Thornley	(England) Stockport County
11 January 1996	11 April 1996	DF	(England) Chris Casper	(England) AFC Bournemouth
29 January 1996	29 February 1996	MF	(England) Terry Cooke	(England) Sunderland
2 February 1996	20 March 1996	GK	(England) Kevin Pilkington	(England) Rochdale
22 February 1996	18 May 1997	MF	(England) Ben Thornley	(England) Huddersfield Town
22 March 1996	22 May 1996	FW	(England) Graeme Tomlinson	(England) Luton Town
