= List of Scarborough F.C. players =

This is a list of notable footballers who have played for Scarborough. Generally, this means players that have played 100 or more league appearances for the club. However, some players who have played fewer matches are also included; this includes holders of a club record and players who gained international caps whilst with the club. The list only includes statistics available for the Football League, as a source is not available for the period of 1889–1987.

For a list of all Scarborough players, major or minor, with a Wikipedia article, see Category:Scarborough F.C. players.

== Notable players ==
Appearances and goals are for league matches only, as complete appearance data is not available for some players. Statistics correct as of 6 November 2007.

Club record holder

Name	Nationality	Position	Scarborough career	Appearances	Goals	Notes
Ian Ironside	England	Goalkeeper	1987–1991; 1991–1992; 1994–1997	183	0	
Jason Rockett	England	Defender	1993–1998	172	11	
Steve Richards	Scotland	Defender	1987–1991	164	13	
Allan Kamara	England	Defender	1987–1991	159	1	
Darren Knowles	England	Defender	1993–1997	144	2	
Adrian Meyer	England	Defender	1989–1995	144	12	
Steve Charles	England	Midfielder	1993–1996	134	20	
Steve Brodie	England	Forward	1996–1999	195	54	
Tommy Graham	Scotland	Midfielder	1987–1990	111	11	
Lee Hirst	England	Defender	1989–1993	108	6	
Simon Thompson	England	Midfielder	1991–1995	108	6	
Tommy Mooney	England	Forward	1990–1993	107	30	
Gareth Williams	England	Midfielder	1996–1999	105	27	
Darren Foreman	England	Forward	1990–1995	97	35	
Martin Russell	Republic of Ireland	Midfielder	1988–1990	51	9	
Chris Short	England	Defender	1988–1990	43	1	
