= Alan Johnson (footballer, born 1971) =

English footballer

Personal information
- Full name: Alan Keith Johnson
- Date of birth: 19 February 1971 (age 55)
- Place of birth: Billinge, Wigan, England
- Height: 6 ft 0 in (1.83 m)
- Position: Defender

Youth career
- Wigan Athletic

Senior career*
Years	Team	Apps	(Gls)
1989–1994	Wigan Athletic	180	(13)
1994–1996	Lincoln City	63	(0)
1995–1996	→ Preston North End (loan)	2	(0)
1996–2000	Rochdale	59	(4)
Total		304	(17)
- * Club domestic league appearances and goals

Alan Keith Johnson (born 19 February 1971) is an English former professional footballer who played as a defender. His son, Will, plays for Fleetwood Town.
