= Nick Burton =

English footballer (born 1975)

Personal information
- Full name: Nicholas John Burton
- Date of birth: 10 February 1975 (age 51)
- Place of birth: Bury St Edmunds, England
- Position: Central defender

Youth career
- 199?–1993: Portsmouth

Senior career*
Years	Team	Apps	(Gls)
1993–1995	Torquay United	16	(2)
1995–1996	Yeovil Town	22	(2)
1996–1997	Aldershot Town	66	(1)
1997–2001	Hampton & Richmond Borough		
2001–2003	Gravesend & Northfleet	54	(3)
2003–2005	Farnborough Town	52	(8)
2005	Crawley Town	6	(0)
2005	Eastleigh	10	(0)
2005–2006	St Albans City	13	(0)
2006	Staines Town	8	(0)
2006–2007	Farnborough Town	36	(1)
2007–2008	Harrow Borough		
2008–2009	Farnborough		
2009–2010	Walton Casuals	27	(4)
- * Club domestic league appearances and goals

Nicholas John Burton (born 10 February 1975) is an English former professional footballer. He played as a central defender and played in the Football League for Torquay United.

Burton began his career as an apprentice at Portsmouth, but on failing to win a professional contract at Fratton Park, he joined Torquay United in February 1993. He scored on his league debut on 31 August 1993 as Torquay drew 1–1 at home to Carlisle United. He played only 16 times in the league for Torquay, scoring once more, in the 4–1 defeat away to Rochdale in January 1994, before being released in 1995 joining Yeovil Town.

He moved to Aldershot Town on a free transfer in February 1996, making his debut as a substitute for Jimmy Sugrue in the 1–0 defeat away to Leyton Pennant on 10 February, and quickly became a regular in the Aldershot side. His only goal for the Shots came on 24 September 1996 as Aldershot drew 2–2 away to Billericay Town. He began the 1997–98 season as a regular in the centre of the Shots' defence, but lost his place and left to join Hampton & Richmond Borough in December 1997.

He helped Hampton to promotion at the end of the season. In the 1999–2000 season he had such a good season that he won almost every one of the various awards given to Hampton players. He missed the start of the following season with a foot injury, but once fit regained his regular place in the Hampton side. In October 2001, even though he was captain of Hampton, he was allowed to join Isthmian League Premier rivals Gravesend & Northfleet on a free transfer as Hampton suffered a cash crisis and released five players. He helped Gravesend to the Isthmian League Premier Division title and with it promotion to the Conference.

He left Gravesend in May 2003 to join Farnborough Town and was immediately appointed captain by Farnborough manager Tommy Taylor. He played over 50 times in the Conference for Farnborough before moving to Crawley Town in March 2005 in exchange deal that took Kevin Hemsley in the opposite direction. He was offered a new contract with Crawley at the end of the season, but turned it down due to work commitments.

He joined Eastleigh in June 2005, but left to join St Albans City in November 2005. He made his Saints' debut in an FA Trophy win away to Heybridge Swifts later that month, but missed the following two matches due his marriage in December 2005. He finally made his Conference South debut on 26 December 2005 as Saints won at home to Bishops Stortford and appeared on the winning side in each of first six games for the club. He left St Albans in March 2006 and joined Staines Town.

He rejoined Farnborough in the 2006 close season, playing 36 times in their Conference South side. He left to join Harrow Borough in the 2007 close season, while also working as a sales executive (in 2000 he had been described in the Sunday Independent as a 'glue salesman by trade'). He moved back to Farnborough in July 2008.

In January 2009, Burton signed for Walton Casuals.
