= Mark Leonard (footballer) =

English footballer

Personal information
- Full name: Mark Anthony Leonard
- Date of birth: 27 September 1962 (age 64)
- Place of birth: St Helens, England
- Height: 5 ft 11 in (1.80 m)
- Position: Striker

Senior career*
Years	Team	Apps	(Gls)
1981–1982	Witton Albion		
1982–1983	Everton	0	(0)
1983	→ Tranmere Rovers (loan)	7	(0)
1983–1985	Crewe Alexandra	54	(15)
1985–1986	Stockport County	73	(23)
1986–1992	Bradford City	157	(29)
1992	Rochdale	9	(1)
1992–1993	Preston North End	22	(1)
1993–1994	Chester City	32	(8)
1994–1996	Wigan Athletic	64	(12)
1996–1999	Rochdale	62	(5)
- * Club domestic league appearances and goals

Mark Anthony Leonard (born 27 September 1962) is an English former professional footballer who was a striker for a number of Football League clubs.

Leonard was born in St Helens. He started his career with non-league side Witton Albion in 1981. Over the next 18 years he played more than 400 league games scoring nearly 100 goals at a number of teams across the North West of England as well as Bradford City. It was at Bradford where he spent the longest spell of his career and he was part of the team that nearly earned promotion to the top flight in 1987–88. He scored 29 goals in 157 appearances at Bradford City.

In 1993–94, Leonard was part of the Chester City side that were promoted as runners-up in Football League Division Three, in his only season with the club. It was the first of three successive clubs he played for under manager Graham Barrow. A knee injury at the last of these, Rochdale, ended his career.

After 19 years as a professional footballer, Leonard took up crown green bowls. He won the Merseyside Merit tournament in 2001.
