= Nicky Peverell =

English footballer

Personal information
- Date of birth: April 28, 1973 (age 53)
- Place of birth: Middlesbrough
- Position: Forward

Senior career*
Years	Team	Apps	(Gls)
- York City
- Gateshead
- Bishop Auckland
- Barrow
- * Club domestic league appearances and goals

Nicholas Peverell (born 28 April 1973) is an English former footballer who played as a forward.

Born in Middlesbrough, Peverell played for York City when they beat Manchester United 3–0 at Old Trafford in the League Cup in 1995.

He later played for Gateshead, Bishop Auckland and Barrow, where his career was ended by a snapped Achilles. He later joined the coaching staff at Middlesbrough.
