= Andy Fensome =

English footballer and manager

Andrew Fensome
Personal information
- Full name: Andrew Brian Fensome
- Date of birth: 18 February 1969 (age 57)
- Place of birth: Northampton, England
- Position: Right back

Senior career*
Years	Team	Apps	(Gls)
1987–1988	Norwich City	0	(0)
1988–1989	Bury Town		
1988	→ Newcastle United (loan)	0	(0)
1989–1993	Cambridge United	126	(1)
1993–1996	Preston North End	93	(1)
1996–1998	Rochdale	59	(0)
1998–2002	Morecambe	125	(0)
- * Club domestic league appearances and goals

Andrew Fensome (born 18 February 1969 in Northampton) is an English former footballer and academy coach at Preston North End. He was assistant manager of Hereford United, until he was sacked on 4 October 2010.

He began his career as an apprentice at Norwich City before moving to Cambridge United.

He signed for Preston North End for a £7,500 fee in October 1993 and was named as the club's Player of the Year in the 1994–95 season. In total, he made 105 appearances for the Deepdale club and scored 2 goals.

He was transferred to Rochdale in July 1996.

He coached at former club Preston North End and worked as a match summariser for BBC Radio Lancashire before joining Hereford United as assistant to manager Simon Davey in June 2010.

== Honours ==
Cambridge United

- Football League Third Division: 1990–91
- Football League Fourth Division play-offs: 1990

Preston North End

- Football League Third Division: 1995–96
