= Ian Clark (footballer) =

English footballer

Personal information
- Full name: Ian David Clark
- Date of birth: 23 October 1974 (age 52)
- Place of birth: Stockton-on-Tees, England
- Height: 5 ft 11 in (1.80 m)
- Position: Utility player

Team information
- Current team

Senior career*
| Years | Team | Apps | (Gls) |
| 19??–1995 | Stockton | | |
| 1995–1997 | Doncaster Rovers | 45 | (3) |
| 1997–2001 | Hartlepool United | 136 | (18) |
| 2001–2005 | Darlington | 113 | (26) |
| 2005–200? | Scarborough | 20 | (1) |
| 2006 | → Harrogate Town (loan) | | |
| 2006–2007 | Gateshead | 18 | (3) |
| 2007 | Spennymoor United | | |
| 2007–2008 | Norton & Stockton Ancients | | |
| 2008–2009 | Horden Colliery Welfare | 36 | (7) |
| 2010–2011 | Guisborough Town | | |
| 2011–2012 | Thornaby | | |

Managerial career
- 2016–2022: Marske United (Head Coach)
- 2022: Shildon (Manager)
- 2022–2024: Marske United (Assistant Manager)
- 2024–2026: Spennymoor Town (Assistant Manager)
- * Club domestic league appearances and goals

Ian David Clark (born 23 October 1974) is an English former professional footballer who made nearly 300 appearances in the Football League playing for Doncaster Rovers, Hartlepool United and Darlington. He also played in the Conference for Scarborough and at other levels of non-League football for Stockton, Harrogate Town, Gateshead, Spennymoor United, Norton & Stockton Ancients, Horden Colliery Welfare, Guisborough Town and Thornaby.
