= Glen Robson =

English footballer (born 1977)

Personal information
- Full name: Glen Alan Robson
- Date of birth: 25 September 1977 (age 49)
- Place of birth: Sunderland, Tyne and Wear, England
- Position: Forward

Youth career
- Southampton

Senior career*
Years	Team	Apps	(Gls)
- Murton
1996–1998	Rochdale	10	(0)
1998	Spennymoor United		
1998–1999	Harrogate Town		
1999–2003	Blyth Spartans	126	(86)
2003	Darlington	6	(0)
2003–200?	Durham City		
2010	Morpeth Town		
2010	Consett		
2010	Brandon United		
2010–2011	Shildon		
2010–2011	→ Stokesley (loan)		
2011	Newton Aycliffe		
2011–2012	Sunderland RCA		
2012–201?	Bedlington Terriers		
- * Club domestic league appearances and goals

Glen Alan Robson (born 25 September 1977) is an English former footballer who played as a forward in the Football League for Rochdale and Darlington. He also played non-league football for many clubs in the north-east of England.

== Life and career ==
Robson was born in Sunderland, Tyne and Wear. He began his football career with local team Murton and spent time as a youngster with Southampton before signing for Third Division club Rochdale in 1996. Robson made his debut in the Football League on 25 February 1997, as a late substitute in a 2–1 defeat at home to Hull City. He played in two more league matches that season and seven the next, all coming off the bench, without scoring, and was released. He then played for Spennymoor United and Harrogate Town, with whom he was the Northern Premier League First Division second-highest goalscorer in the 1998–99 season.

Robson signed for a third Northern Premier side, Blyth Spartans, ahead of the 1999–2000 season. His Blyth career was interrupted by an ankle injury sustained in October 1999, later confirmed as a hairline fracture, that forced him to miss the remainder of the season. Returned to fitness, he scored heavily in his second season, at the end of which he had a trial with Darlington of the Third Division. He chose not to take up their offer, as he would earn more playing semi-professionally for Blyth and working outside football. Again the club's top scorer in 2001–02, he was equally prolific in 2002–03 when available, but was sent off several times and missed large parts of the season through suspension. His Blyth career ended with 86 goals from 126 appearances, and he went on to be inducted into the Blyth Spartans Hall of Fame.

In the 2003 close season, he made another attempt to break back into the Football League. He was reported to have taken a week off work and paid his own expenses to take part in Oldham Athletic's pre-season tour to Ireland, and then, after scoring three goals in two pre-season fixtures for Darlington, signed a one-year contract with the club. He played six games in August, which included scoring the matchwinning penalty in the shootout to eliminate First Division club Bradford City from the League Cup, and a place in the starting eleven for Darlington's first match at their new stadium, but was then out until the end of October with a hamstring injury. He made one brief substitute appearance on his return, but was released a few days later by new manager David Hodgson, and signed for Northern League club Durham City.

Given orders to "shoot on sight", Robson scored 24 goals in what remained of the season and helped his team reach the final of the Northern League Cup and finish as runners-up in the league. Despite interest from other clubs, he signed for another season with Durham. In November 2004, he suffered a knee injury that was to keep him out of football for a lengthy period. In May 2009, he was reported to be "keen to resurrect his career at Durham", and he trained with the club at the beginning of the new season, but did not sign.

Robson played for Northern League Morpeth Town in 2009–10, and went on to appear for a variety of clubs in north-eastern non-league football: successively, Consett, Brandon United, Shildon, Stokesley (on loan), Newton Aycliffe, Sunderland RCA, and Bedlington Terriers.

Robson joined Easington Colliery as a coach in 2017 and made one substitute appearance in a 5–5 draw at Heaton Stannington. Robson, along with the rest of the management team, left the club after that game.
