= Paul Olsson =

English footballer

Personal information
- Full name: Paul Olsson
- Date of birth: 24 December 1965 (age 60)
- Place of birth: Hull, England
- Height: 5 ft 8 in (1.73 m)
- Position: Midfielder

Youth career
- –: Hull City

Senior career*
Years	Team	Apps	(Gls)
1983–1987	Hull City	0	(0)
1987	→ Exeter City (loan)	8	(0)
1987–1988	Exeter City	35	(2)
1988–1989	Scarborough	48	(5)
1989–1994	Hartlepool United	171	(13)
1994–1996	Darlington	76	(8)
–	North Ferriby United		
Total		338	(28)

Managerial career
- 2010–2011: Scarborough Athletic
- * Club domestic league appearances and goals

Paul Olsson (born 24 December 1965) is an English former footballer who scored 28 goals from 338 appearances in the Football League playing for Exeter City, Scarborough, Hartlepool United and Darlington in the 1980s and 1990s. A midfielder, he began his football career with home-town club Hull City without appearing for them in the league, and also played non-league football for North Ferriby United.

He was manager of Scarborough Athletic in the 2010–11 season.
