= Steve Thornber =

English footballer

Personal information
- Full name: Stephen John Thornber
- Date of birth: 11 October 1965 (age 61)
- Place of birth: Dewsbury, England
- Height: 5 ft 9 in (1.75 m)
- Position: Midfielder

Senior career*
Years	Team	Apps	(Gls)
1983–1988	Halifax Town	104	(4)
1988–1992	Swansea City	117	(6)
1992–1993	Blackpool	24	(0)
1993–1996	Scunthorpe United	77	(7)
1997–1998	Bradford Park Avenue	?	(?)
Total		322	(17)
- * Club domestic league appearances and goals

Stephen John Thornber (born 11 October 1965) is an English former professional footballer and current youth team manager of Bradford City.

Thornber, a midfielder, began his career as a junior with Halifax Town in 1983. He remained with the Shaymen for five years, making 104 league appearances and scoring four goals.

In 1988, he moved to Swansea City in a £10,000 deal. In three years at the Welsh club he made 117 appearances, scoring six goals.

His next move, in 1992, was to Blackpool, then managed by Billy Ayre, a former teammate and manager of Thornber during his time at Halifax. After a year and just under a quarter-century of appearances at Bloomfield Road, he joined Scunthorpe United on a free transfer.
