= Scott Sloan (footballer) =

English footballer

Personal information
- Full name: Mark Scott Sloan
- Date of birth: 14 December 1967 (age 58)
- Place of birth: Wallsend, England
- Position: Forward

Youth career
- Ponteland United

Senior career*
Years	Team	Apps	(Gls)
1988–1990	Berwick Rangers	61	(20)
1990–1991	Newcastle United	16	(1)
1991–1994	Falkirk	64	(11)
1994	→ Cambridge United (loan)	4	(1)
1994–1996	Hartlepool United	35	(2)
1996	Kalmar FF		
1996–1997	Berwick Rangers	1	(0)
- Whitley Bay
Total		181	(35)
- * Club domestic league appearances and goals

Mark Scott Sloan (born 14 December 1967) is an English retired footballer. He was born in Wallsend on 14 December 1967. He played as a striker. Since retirement he works as a fireman in Tyneside.
