= Chris Clarke (footballer, born 1974) =

English footballer

Personal information
- Full name: Christopher John Clarke
- Date of birth: 1 May 1974 (age 52)
- Place of birth: Barnsley, England
- Position: Goalkeeper

Youth career
- Bolton Wanderers

Senior career*
Years	Team	Apps	(Gls)
1994–96	Rochdale	30	(0)
1996–?	Chorley		
- * Club domestic league appearances and goals

Chris Clarke (born 1 May 1974) is an English former footballer who played as a goalkeeper.
