= Andy Toman =

English footballer and manager

Personal information
- Full name: Andrew James Toman
- Date of birth: 7 March 1962 (age 64)
- Place of birth: Northallerton, England
- Height: 5 ft 10 in (1.78 m)
- Position: Midfielder

Senior career*
Years	Team	Apps	(Gls)
–1984	Shildon		
1984–1985	Bishop Auckland		
1985–1986	Lincoln City	24	(4)
1986–1987	Bishop Auckland		
1986–1989	Hartlepool United	112	(28)
1989–1993	Darlington	115	(10)
1992–1993	→ Scarborough (loan)	6	(0)
1993–1994	Scunthorpe United	15	(5)
1993–1996	Scarborough	45	(3)
1996–1999	Whitby Town		
1999–2000	Blyth Spartans		
1999–2000	Barrow		
2002	Spennymoor United		
2002–2004	Peterlee Newtown		

Managerial career
- 2002–2003: Peterlee Newtown (player-manager)
- 2005: Durham City
- 2005–2007: Guisborough Town
- 2007–2008: Northallerton Town
- 2008–2010: Seaham Red Star
- 2014–2015: West Auckland Town (interim)
- * Club domestic league appearances and goals

Andrew James Toman (born 7 March 1962) is an English former footballer who played as a midfielder.

== Playing career ==
Toman started his career in the Northern League with Shildon, before joining Bishop Auckland. In the summer of 1985, Toman was offered his first taste of league football when Lincoln City paid £10,000 to secure his services. After a season with Lincoln, Toman returned to Bishop Auckland. In January 1987, Hartlepool United offered Toman a second chance at league football, paying Bishop Auckland £6,000 for him.

In the summer of 1989, a £40,000 fee saw him link up with Brian Little's Darlington for their successful campaign in the Football Conference. He remained at Feethams for a further three seasons, joining Scarborough on loan at the end of the 1992–1993 season, before being released in the summer of 1993.

He joined Scunthorpe United for the 1993–1994 season, but despite scoring 5 goals in 15 league appearances, he moved on to join Scarborough, this time on a permanent basis. He remained at Scarborough until the summer of 1996, which marked the end of his league career after 317 league appearances and 50 league goals.

He linked up with Whitby Town, scoring in their 3–0 FA Vase final victory over North Ferriby United at Wembley Stadium on 10 May 1997. After three seasons at Whitby, he had a short spell at Blyth Spartans, leaving after being sent off for dissent towards his own goalkeeper in the 5–3 defeat to Leigh RMI in the FA Cup on 18 September 1999. He joined Barrow, where he remained until the end of the season.

In December 2014, Andy joined West Auckland Town as interim manager until the end of the season.

== Management and coaching career ==
In September 2000, he joined Spennymoor United as player-coach but left after one month. In October 2002, he joined Peterlee Newtown as player-manager. Toman steered the club away from relegation from the Northern League Division One, winning four and drawing two of their final six games to overhaul Prudhoe Town after which Toman announced his resignation but, having received financial assurances from the club, had a change of heart and continued in charge. He finally left Peterlee in September 2004, stating that "I feel that I've taken the club as far as I can, plus I'm not enjoying it any more". His next appointment came in March 2005 when Durham City appointed him to the manager's post. However, he was relieved of the post in April 2005, with Toman describing himself as "flabbergasted" at the decision to replace him. In November 2005 he took the hotseat at Guisborough Town who were then bottom of the Northern League Division Two. After steering them away from the bottom of the table in the 2005–2006, and having a more promising season in 2006–2007, he resigned in April 2007. In May 2007 he was appointed to his current role as manager at Northallerton Town. Toman is employed as the football academy coordinator at Middlesbrough College. In 2007 the college was awarded the title of best female football development centre in the country by the FA and Toman travelled to Wembley Stadium to receive the award.

== Honours ==
=== As a player ===
Darlington

- Football League Fourth Division: 1990–91
- Football Conference: 1989–90

Whitby Town

- FA Vase: 1996–97
