= Paul Lyons (footballer) =

English footballer

Personal information
- Full name: Paul Lyons
- Date of birth: 24 June 1977 (age 49)
- Place of birth: Leigh, England
- Positions: Defender; midfielder

Youth career
- 1993–1995: Manchester United

Senior career*
Years	Team	Apps	(Gls)
1995–1997	Rochdale	3	(0)
- Radcliffe Borough
- Bacup Borough
- * Club domestic league appearances and goals

Paul Lyons (born 24 June 1977) is an English former footballer who played as a defender or midfielder.

Lyons was part of the Youth Training Scheme at Manchester United and played alongside players like Phil Neville, David Johnson and Phil Mulryne. In August 1994, he signed a professional contract with United but until his departure a year later he played no role in the first team and did not take part in the successful FA Youth Cup team of 1994–95.

In July 1995, he went for a trial with Third Division side Rochdale and was signed. In the spring of 1996, he made three appearances in the league. That summer, he received a short-term professional contract, but the 1996–97 season saw him no longer part of the matchday squad under new manager Graham Barrow and he left the club during the season.
