= Darren Oliver (footballer) =

English footballer

Personal information
- Full name: Darren Oliver
- Date of birth: 1 November 1971 (age 55)
- Place of birth: Liverpool, England
- Position: Defender

Youth career
- 1988-1990: Bolton Wanderers

Senior career*
| Years | Team | Apps | (Gls) |
| 1990-1993 | Bolton Wanderers | 3 | (0) |
| 1993 | → Peterborough United (loan) | 0 | (0) |
| 1993-1995 | Rochdale | 28 | (0) |
- Altrincham
- Barrow
- Stafford Rangers
- * Club domestic league appearances and goals

Darren Oliver (born 1 November 1971) is an English former footballer who played as a defender.

He signed for Bolton as a youth trainee in the summer of 1990, working firstly under the management of Phil Neal and then Bruce Rioch.

Rioch gave him his Football League debut in October 1992 in an away game at Leyton Orient replacing the experienced David Burke as the Wanderers left-back.

Towards the end of his time at Bolton he had a short loan spell with Peterborough United, scoring the winning goal in his only appearance for them against Barnsley in the Coca-Cola Cup.

Oliver spent a total of six years at Burnden Park before moving to Rochdale for £30,000 in 1993.

He later played for Altrincham, Barrow and Stafford Rangers in non-league football.
