= Derek Hall (footballer, born 1965) =

English footballer (born 1965)

Personal information
- Full name: Derek Robert Hall
- Date of birth: 5 January 1965 (age 61)
- Place of birth: Ashton-under-Lyne, England
- Height: 5 ft 10 in (1.78 m)
- Position: Midfielder

Youth career
- Coventry City

Senior career*
Years	Team	Apps	(Gls)
1982–1984	Coventry City	1	(0)
1984	→ Torquay United (loan)		
1984–1985	Torquay United	55	(6)
1985–1986	Swindon Town	10	(0)
1986–1989	Southend United	123	(15)
1989–1991	Halifax Town	49	(4)
1991–1994	Hereford United	103	(18)
1994–1996	Rochdale	23	(2)
1995–1996	→ Altrincham (loan)	4	(0)
1996	Hyde United	0	(0)
- Stalybridge Celtic
- Curzon Ashton
- Woodley Sports
- Buxton
2000–2002	Curzon Ashton		

Managerial career
- 1998–1999: Buxton
- 2009–2017: Port Adelaide Lion
- 2017–2018: Modbury vista state league
- * Club domestic league appearances and goals

Derek Robert Hall (born 5 January 1965) is an English former professional footballer. He is senior coach at Port Adelaide Lion F.C. in the South Australian Premier League.

== Career ==
Hall was born in Ashton-under-Lyne. He began his career as an apprentice with Coventry City, turning professional in October 1982 and making his only league appearance for the Sky Blues later that season. He joined Torquay United on loan in March 1984, earning himself a permanent move on a free transfer at the end of the season.

In July 1985 he moved to Swindon Town, again on a free transfer, but struggled to settle at the County Ground and moved to Southend United on a free the following August. He settled in well at Roots Hall, playing 123 times over the next 3 seasons, scoring 15 goals in the process, before moving to Halifax Town on a free transfer in July 1989. His next move, after 4 goals in 49 games for Halifax, took him to Hereford United, once more on a free transfer, in July 1991. He was appointed captain of the Hereford side and was ever-present in the 1993–94 season, before becoming part of Greg Downs's clearout at Edgar Street, Hall moving to Rochdale for a fee of £10,000 in August 1994. He made only 24 appearances for 'Dale, scoring twice and despite not being a regular had a chant (to the tune of Wonderwall) invented in his honour.

He joined Altrincham on loan in December 1995 and was released by Rochdale at the end of the season, joining non-league Hyde United. He later moved on to Stalybridge Celtic, Curzon Ashton and Woodley Sports, also playing for Buxton and managing them during the 1998–99 season, before rejoining Curzon Ashton in July 2000 as player-coach. He emigrated to Australia in June 2002, but was back as assistant manager of Curzon Ashton by at least November 2005.

Currently Derek is the Senior Coach at Port Adelaide Lion which plays in the South Australian Premier League in Adelaide, Australia, and Coaching Director at the J & L Consulting Football (Soccer) Academy
