= Adrian Meyer =

English footballer (born 1970)

Personal information
- Full name: Adrian Michael Meyer
- Date of birth: 22 September 1970 (age 56)
- Place of birth: Yate, England
- Position: Central defender

Youth career
- –1989: Scarborough

Senior career*
Years	Team	Apps	(Gls)
1989–1995	Scarborough	114	(9)
1995–1996	VS Rugby		
Total		114+	(9+)
- * Club domestic league appearances and goals

Adrian Michael Meyer (born 22 September 1970) is an English former professional footballer who played as a central defender. He played for Scarborough and VS Rugby.
