= Dave Lancaster =

English footballer

Personal information
- Full name: David Lancaster
- Date of birth: 8 September 1961
- Place of birth: Preston, England
- Position: Forward

Senior career*
Years	Team	Apps	(Gls)
1987	Leyland Motors		
1988	Morecambe		
1989	Colne Dynamoes		
1990–1991	Blackpool	8	(1)
1990	→ Telford United (loan)		
1990–1991	→ Chesterfield (loan)	12	(4)
1991–1993	Chesterfield	69	(16)
1993–1994	Rochdale	40	(14)
1994	Halifax Town		
1995–1996	Bury	10	(1)
1996	→ Rochdale (loan)	14	(2)
1996	Rochdale	6	(0)
1996	Bamber Bridge		
Total		159	(38)
- * Club domestic league appearances and goals

David Lancaster (born 8 September 1961) is an English former footballer who played for Blackpool, Chesterfield, Rochdale and Bury.

In September 1992, he scored twice against Liverpool at Anfield to put Chesterfield three goals up in a League Cup tie which was eventually drawn 4-4. In the 1993-94 season, he was joint top goalscorer for Rochdale.
