= Dean Martin (footballer, born 1967) =

English football defender

Personal information
- Full name: Dean Stacey Martin
- Date of birth: 9 September 1967 (age 59)
- Place of birth: Halifax, West Riding of Yorkshire, England
- Height: 5 ft 10 in (1.78 m)
- Position: Midfielder

Senior career*
Years	Team	Apps	(Gls)
1985–1991	Halifax Town	153	(7)
1991–1995	Scunthorpe United	106	(7)
1994	→ Halifax Town (loan)		
1995–1997	Rochdale	53	(0)
1996	→ Halifax Town (loan)		
1997	Lancaster City		
1998	Stalybridge Celtic		
1998–2000	Lancaster City		
2001	Bradford (Park Avenue)		
2002	Stalybridge Celtic		
- * Club domestic league appearances and goals

Dean Stacey Martin (born 9 September 1967) is an English former footballer who played in the Football League for Halifax Town, Rochdale and Scunthorpe United.
