= Jason Peake =

English footballer (born 1971)

Personal information
- Date of birth: 29 September 1971 (age 55)
- Place of birth: Leicester, England
- Height: 5 ft 10 in (1.78 m)
- Position: Midfielder

Senior career*
| Years | Team | Apps | (Gls) |
| 1990–1992 | Leicester City | 8 | (1) |
| 1992 | → Hartlepool United (loan) | 6 | (1) |
| 1992–1994 | Halifax Town | 33 | (1) |
| 1994–1996 | Rochdale | 95 | (6) |
| 1996–1997 | Brighton & Hove Albion | 23 | (1) |
| 1997–1998 | Bury | 6 | (0) |
| 1998–2000 | Rochdale | 81 | (11) |
| 2000–2001 | Plymouth Argyle | 10 | (2) |
| 2000–2001 | → Nuneaton Borough (loan) | 7 | (0) |
| 2001–2003 | Nuneaton Borough | 54 | (4) |
| Total | | 323 | (26) |
- * Club domestic league appearances and goals

Jason Peake (born 29 September 1971) is an English retired footballer who played as a midfielder.

Born in Leicester, Peake made his professional first team debut for his hometown club, Leicester City in 1990. He spent time on loan with Hartlepool United in 1992 before joining Halifax Town later that year. Two years later, he was signed by Rochdale and spent a productive two years there, scoring six goals in 95 league games. One year spells with Brighton & Hove Albion and Bury followed, before Peake returned to Rochdale. He scored another 11 goals in 81 league appearances, but couldn't agree a new contract in the summer of 2000.

He was then signed by Kevin Hodges for Plymouth Argyle. His time with the Devon club was short-lived as he fell out of favour following the arrival of Paul Sturrock as the club's new manager. He scored three goals in 13 appearances, including one in a man of the match performance against Carlisle United, before being allowed to join non-league club Nuneaton Borough in December 2000. He signed for them permanently at the end of the 2000–01 season. Peake was an influential member of the squad in his first season with the club, but endured an injury-plagued 2002–03 season at Manor Park. He was released from his contract in April 2003.
