= Ian Thompstone =

English footballer

Personal information
- Date of birth: 17 January 1971 (age 55)
- Place of birth: Bury, England
- Position: Midfielder

Youth career
- Manchester City

Senior career*
Years	Team	Apps	(Gls)
1988–1990	Manchester City	1	(1)
1990–1992	Oldham Athletic	0	(0)
1992	Exeter City	15	(3)
1992–1993	Halifax Town	31	(9)
1993–1995	Scunthorpe United	60	(8)
1995–1996	Rochdale	25	(1)
1996–1997	Scarborough	19	(2)
1997	Bury	0	(0)
1997	Atherton LR		
1997	Flixton		
- Walshaw Sports
- * Club domestic league appearances and goals

Ian Thompstone (born 17 January 1971) is an English former footballer who played for Manchester City, Exeter City, Halifax Town, Scunthorpe United, Rochdale and Scarborough as a midfielder. In his only Manchester City appearance, he became the club's youngest ever goalscorer, a record he held until 2013.

During the 1990s he played for a number of clubs in the lower divisions of the Football League, and made a total of 150 league appearances.

== Career ==
Thompstone was born in Bury, Greater Manchester. He started his career with Manchester City, who in the 1980s had a strong reputation for youth development. He received a call-up to the first team for a match against Middlesbrough in April 1988, when several senior players were unavailable due to injury. Thompstone was named as a substitute. He replaced Trevor Morley in the second half, and scored with his second touch of the ball. The goal made him the youngest known goalscorer in club history, aged 17 years and 82 days. The record stood until January 2013, when it was broken by Marcos Lopes. As Lopes' goal came in an FA Cup match, Thompstone's goal remains a record for a Manchester City player in a Football League match. Despite his goalscoring debut, Thompstone never played for the club again.

Thompstone was still eligible for youth team football in the 1988–89 season, despite having made his first team debut. Manchester City's youth team progressed to the final of the 1989 FA Youth Cup, where they faced Watford. Thompstone played both legs of the final. In the first leg, Thompstone redirected a Michael Hughes corner into the path of Mike Wallace, who scored the only goal of the game. However, Watford won the second leg 2–0 to win the cup. An ankle injury sidelined Thompstone for much of the following season. Manchester City offered him a short-term contract, but he opted to sign a longer deal at Oldham Athletic instead.

Injury disrupted Thompstone's Oldham career, in which he failed to make a senior appearance. In the 1992 close season he moved to Exeter City on a free transfer. In one of his early games for the club he scored a hat-trick against Northampton Town. In early January his total for Halifax reached nine with two goals at Darlington, though those were his last for the club. On the March 1993 transfer deadline day he moved from Halifax to Scunthorpe for a £15,000 fee. In October 1993 he scored in a 7–0 win for Scunthorpe against Northampton Town. Thompstone left Scunthorpe in the 1995 close season, and joined Rochdale. In total, he made 70 appearances for Scunthorpe, and scored nine goals.

At Rochdale Thompstone played in an FA Cup tie against Liverpool at Anfield, though his team ended the match on the wrong side of a 7–0 scoreline. At the end of the season he again changed clubs, with a move to Scarborough. The Yorkshire club was where Thompstone made his final Football League appearances; he had a short spell at Bury in 1997 but did not play any first team matches. In April 1997 he moved from Bury to non-league Atherton LR. He proceeded to play for a number of non-league teams in North West England, including Flixton and Walshaw Sports. As of 2013, Thompstone was working as a financial advisor.
