= Paul Williams (Northern Ireland footballer) =

Northern Irish footballer

Personal information
- Full name: Paul Andrew Williams
- Date of birth: 8 September 1963 (age 63)
- Place of birth: Belfast Ireland
- Height: 6 ft 4 in (1.93 m)

Senior career*
Years	Team	Apps	(Gls)
1985–1986	Distillery	110	(26)
1986–1987	Preston North End	1	(0)
1987	Carlisle United	0	(0)
1987–1988	Newport County	26	(3)
1988–1989	Sheffield United	8	(0)
1989–1990	→ Hartlepool United (loan)	8	(0)
1990–1991	Stockport County	24	(14)
1991–1993	West Bromwich Albion	44	(5)
1992	→ Coventry City (loan)	2	(0)
1993	Stockport County	16	(3)
1993–1996	Rochdale	37	(7)
1996	→ Doncaster Rovers (loan)	3	(1)
1996–1997	Altrincham	7	(0)
Total		279	(55)

International career
1991	Northern Ireland	1	(0)
- * Club domestic league appearances and goals

Paul Andrew Williams (born 8 September 1963) is a Northern Irish retired footballer. He won one cap for the Northern Ireland national football team. He played as a forward. While at Stockport County he played alongside another Paul Williams, from England.
