= Kevin Formby =

English footballer

Personal information
- Full name: Kevin Formby
- Date of birth: 22 July 1971 (age 55)
- Place of birth: Skem, England
- Position: Defender

Senior career*
Years	Team	Apps	(Gls)
1990-	Burscough		
1994-97	Rochdale	67	(1)
1997-2000	Southport	83	(4)
- * Club domestic league appearances and goals

Kevin Formby (born 22 July 1971) is an English former footballer who played as a defender.
