= Mark Stuart (footballer) =

English footballer

Personal information
- Full name: Mark Richard Stuart
- Date of birth: 15 December 1966 (age 59)
- Place of birth: Hammersmith, England
- Height: 5 ft 8 in (1.73 m)
- Position: Midfielder

Senior career*
| Years | Team | Apps | (Gls) |
| 1984–1989 | Charlton Athletic | 107 | (28) |
| 1989–1990 | Plymouth Argyle | 57 | (11) |
| 1990 | → Ipswich Town (loan) | 5 | (2) |
| 1990–1992 | Bradford City | 29 | (5) |
| 1992–1993 | Huddersfield Town | 15 | (3) |
| 1993–1999 | Rochdale | 202 | (41) |
| 1995 | → Chesterfield (loan) | 0 | (0) |
| 1999–2001 | Southport | 57 | (10) |
| 2001–2002 | Stalybridge Celtic | | |
| 2002 | Guiseley | | |
- * Club domestic league appearances and goals

Mark Richard Stuart (born 15 December 1966 in Hammersmith) is an English former professional footballer who played as a midfielder for Charlton Athletic, Plymouth Argyle, Ipswich Town, Bradford City, Huddersfield Town, Rochdale, Chesterfield, Southport, Stalybridge Celtic and Guiseley.
