= Andy Thackeray =

English footballer

Personal information
- Full name: Andrew John Thackeray
- Date of birth: 13 February 1968 (age 58)
- Place of birth: Huddersfield, England
- Height: 5 ft 9 in (1.75 m)
- Position: Defender

Youth career
- 198x–1986: Manchester City

Senior career*
Years	Team	Apps	(Gls)
1986–1987	Huddersfield Town	2	(0)
1987–1988	Newport County	54	(4)
1988–1992	Wrexham	152	(14)
1992–1997	Rochdale	162	(13)
1997–1999	Halifax Town	79	(7)
1999–2003	Nuneaton Borough	125	(10)
2003–2005	Ashton United		
2005–2007	Mossley		
- * Club domestic league appearances and goals

Andrew John Thackeray (born 13 February 1968 in Huddersfield) is an English former professional footballer who made more than 400 appearances in the Football League playing as a defender.

Thackeray was part of the Manchester City youth team which won the FA Youth Cup in 1986, but moved on to Huddersfield Town without appearing for City's first team. He played only twice for Huddersfield, then spent a season with Newport County, before making more than 150 league appearances for each of his next two employers, Wrexham and Rochdale. In the 1997–98 season he helped Halifax Town to promotion from the Conference and played one more season in the Football League. Thackeray then returned to the Conference, spending four seasons with Nuneaton Borough. In 2003, he joined Ashton United, where he scored 5 goals from 91 games in all competitions, and for a time acted as assistant manager. His final club before retirement was Mossley, where he scored 4 goals from 74 games, and won the Player of the Year award in helping them to the Northern Premier League Division One title in the 2005–06 season.
