= Steve Whitehall =

English footballer (born 1966)

Personal information
- Full name: Steven Whitehall
- Date of birth: 8 December 1966 (age 59)
- Place of birth: Bromborough, England
- Position: Striker

Senior career*
Years	Team	Apps	(Gls)
1990–1991	Southport		
1991–1997	Rochdale	235	(74)
1997–1998	Mansfield Town	44	(25)
1999–2000	Oldham Athletic	76	(13)
2000	→ Chester City (loan)	5	(5)
2000–2001	Chester City	23	(4)
2001	Nuneaton Town	16	(6)
2001–2003	Southport	35	(10)
2003–2005	Marine		

Managerial career
- Southport (caretaker)
- * Club domestic league appearances and goals

Steven Whitehall (born 8 December 1966) is an English retired footballer who played as a striker in the Football League with Rochdale, Mansfield Town and Oldham Athletic.

== Post-playing career ==
Whitehall graduated from the University of Liverpool in 1999 with a degree in Biology and also from the University of Salford in 1999 with a degree in Physiotherapy.

He has had spells as physiotherapist at both Northwich Victoria and Southport, also becoming caretaker manager at the latter.

== Personal life ==
His son Danny Whitehall is also a footballer.
