= Jamie Taylor (footballer, born 1977) =

English footballer (born 1977)

Personal information
- Full name: Jamie Lee Taylor
- Date of birth: 11 January 1977 (age 49)
- Place of birth: Bury, England
- Position: Midfielder

Youth career
- Manchester United
- Rochdale

Senior career*
Years	Team	Apps	(Gls)
1993–1997	Rochdale	36	(4)
- Altrincham
- * Club domestic league appearances and goals

Jamie Taylor (born 11 January 1977) is an English former footballer who played as a midfielder.
