= 1995 Football League Third Division play-off final =

Chesterfield	Bury
2	0
- Date: 27 May 1995
- Venue: Wembley Stadium, London
- Man of the Match: Billy Stewart
- Referee: Paul Alcock (Surrey)
- Attendance: 22,814

The 1995 Football League Third Division play-off final was an association football match which was played on 27 May 1995 at Wembley Stadium, London, between Chesterfield and Bury to determine the third and final team to gain promotion from the Football League Third Division to the Second Division. The top two teams of the 1994–95 Football League Third Division, Carlisle United and Walsall, gained automatic promotion to the Second Division, while those placed from third to sixth place in the table took part in play-offs. The winners of the play-off semi-finals competed for the final place for the 1995–96 season in the Second Division. The losing semi-finalists were Preston North End and Mansfield Town.

The match, refereed by Paul Alcock, was played in front of 22,814 spectators. Chesterfield won the match 2–0 with first-half goals from Tony Lormor and Phil Robinson to gain promotion back to the third tier of English football five seasons after being relegated. For the club's manager, John Duncan, it was his second success with Chesterfield as a manager, having won the Fourth Division title in 1985. His counterpart, Mike Walsh, parted company with Bury less than four months later.

Chesterfield's next season saw them end in seventh position in the Second Division, one place and one point below the play-offs. Bury ended their following campaign in third place in the Third Division, securing automatic promotion to the Second Division for the 1996–97 season.

== Route to the final ==
Football League Third Division final table, leading positions
Pos	Team	Pld	W	D	L	GF	GA	GD	Pts
1	Carlisle United	42	27	10	5	67	31	+36	91
2	Walsall	42	24	11	7	75	40	+35	83
3	Chesterfield	42	23	12	7	62	37	+25	81
4	Bury	42	23	11	8	73	36	+37	80
5	Preston North End	42	19	10	13	58	41	+17	67
6	Mansfield Town	42	18	11	13	84	59	+25	65

Chesterfield finished the regular 1994–95 season in third position in the Football League Third Division, the third tier of the English football league system, one place and one point ahead of Bury. Both therefore missed out on the two automatic places for promotion to the Second Division and instead took part in the play-offs to determine the third promoted team. Chesterfield finished two points behind Walsall (who were promoted in second place) and ten behind league winners Carlisle United.

Bury's opponents in their play-off semi-final were Preston North End with the first match of the two-legged tie taking place at Deepdale in Preston on 13 May 1995. The visiting side took the lead in the 40th minute when David Pugh received a pass from Nick Daws before striking the ball from 10 yards (9.1 m), past Preston North End goalkeeper John Vaughan. Despite having a number of chances to score, Preston North End could not level the match and it ended 1–0 to Bury. The second leg was held at Gigg Lane in Bury three days later. Tony Rigby put the home team ahead with a 20-yard (18 m) volley in the 88th minute, and although Tony Kelly was sent off seconds later, the game finished 1–0, with Bury progressing to the final with a 2–0 aggregate win.

Chesterfield faced Mansfield Town in their semi-final and the first leg was played at Field Mill in Mansfield. After a goalless first half, Phil Robinson gave Chesterfield the lead in the 64th minute after out-pacing the Mansfield Town defence and scoring past Darren Ward in goal. Stewart Hadley levelled the score eight minutes later when he struck from the edge of the Chesterfield penalty area after the defence failed to clear a free kick, and the match ended 1–1. The second leg took place at Saltergate in Chesterfield three days later. Paul Holland gave Mansfield the lead after three minutes with a header before Tony Lormor equalised midway through the first half. Steve Wilkinson then restored Mansfield's lead with a goal on 32 minutes but Robinson equalised and regular time ended by the score at 2–2, and 3–3 on aggregate, sending the game into extra time. Kevin Lampkin was sent off for Mansfield before Nicky Law scored from a penalty. Mark Peters was then also dismissed, leaving Mansfield with nine players, and further strikes from Jonathan Howard and Robinson made the final score 5–2 with Chesterfield progressing to the final with a 6–3 aggregate victory.

== Match ==
=== Background ===
Chesterfield were making their second appearance in a play-off final, having lost 1–0 against Cambridge United in the 1990 Football League Fourth Division play-off final. They had played in the fourth tier of English football since suffering relegation in the 1988–89 season. Bury had participated in play-offs on two previous occasions, losing in the semi-finals in both: 2–0 on aggregate to Tranmere Rovers in 1990 and 2–1 over the two legs to Bolton Wanderers in 1991. Bury had played in the fourth tier since being relegated in the 1991–92 season. It was Bury's first match at the national stadium. In the two matches between the sides during the regular season, Bury had won 2–1 at Gigg Lane in September 1994 while the return fixture at Saltergate the following March ended in a goalless draw. Chesterfield's manager John Duncan had led the team to promotion in a previous spell in charge as champions of the Fourth Division in the 1984–85 season. His second period at the club came three years after leaving Ipswich Town in 1990.

The referee for the match was Paul Alcock of Redhill, Surrey. Among the substitutes for Chesterfield was the 43-year-old commercial manager of the club, Jim Brown, as Billy Stewart, their third-choice goalkeeper, was in the starting line-up.

=== Summary ===
The final kicked off around 3 p.m. at Wembley Stadium on 27 May 1995 in front of 22,814 spectators. Bury dominated the first half, with Don Beet writing in The Guardian that they "flung everything at Billy Stewart's goal from the start". Midway through the first half, a long throw-in flew deep into the Bury penalty area and after Des Hazel challenged a defender, the ball fell to Lormor who struck it cleanly past Gary Kelly in the Bury goal to make it 1–0. In the 41st minute, Chesterfield doubled their lead: Law sent in another long throw-in and Robinson headed it into the Bury net despite the attention of a number of defenders. At half time, Bury made their first change of the game with Mark Carter being substituted off for John Paskin. The 68th minute saw Bury's closest chance to score when Rigby struck a free kick against the Chesterfield goalpost. Late in the game, Kelly saved attempts to score from both Robinson and second-half substitute Kevin Davies. The match ended 2–0 to Chesterfield who were promoted to the Second Division.

=== Details ===
27 May 1995
15:00 BST

Chesterfield	2–0	Bury
Lormor 23'; Robinson 41'	(Report)

Wembley Stadium, London
Attendance: 22,814
Referee: Paul Alcock

Chesterfield	Bury

GK	1	Billy Stewart
WB	2	Jamie Hewitt
CB	5	Darren Carr
CB	6	Nicky Law (c)	Booked
WB	3	Lee Rogers
WG	7	Phil Robinson
CM	4	Tom Curtis
CM	8	Jonathan Howard (substituted off) 77'
WG	11	Des Hazel
CF	9	Tony Lormor (substituted off) 85'
CF	10	Andy Morris
Substitutes:
GK	12	Jim Brown
MF	13	Chris Perkins (substituted in) 77'
FW	14	Kevin Davies (substituted in) 85'
Manager:
John Duncan

GK	1	Gary Kelly
WB	2	Andy Woodward
CB	5	Chris Lucketti
CB	6	Michael Jackson
WB	3	Roger Stanislaus
WG	7	Jimmy Mulligan (substituted off) 61'
CM	4	Nick Daws
CM	8	Tony Rigby
WG	11	David Pugh (c)
FW	9	Mark Carter (substituted off) 46'
FW	10	Phil Stant
Substitutes:
GK	12	Lee Bracey
DF	13	Ian Hughes (substituted in) 61'
FW	14	John Paskin (substituted in) 46'
Manager:
Mike Walsh

== Post-match ==
Laws described Bury's early dominance as "like Custer's last stand out there", but his manager John Duncan said that his goalkeeper had been "solid as a rock". Despite his side's loss, Mike Walsh still favoured the play-offs, suggesting that "they are great for the supporters". He left Bury in September 1995 with the club in seventeenth position in the Third Division.

Chesterfield's next season saw them end in seventh position in the Second Division, one place and one point below the play-offs. Bury ended their following campaign in third place in the Third Division, securing automatic promotion to the Second Division for the 1996–97 season.
