= 1999–2000 Chesterfield F.C. season =

Chesterfield
1999–2000 season
- Manager: John Duncan (until April); Nicky Law
- Stadium: Saltergate
- Football League Second Division: 24th (Relegation)
- FA Cup: First round
- League Cup: Second round
- Football League Trophy: Semi final
- Top goalscorer: Dave Reeves (18)
Home colours

During the 1999–2000 English football season, Chesterfield F.C. competed in the Football League Second Division where they finished in 24th position and were relegated to Division Three.

== Final league table ==
Pos	Team	Pld	W	D	L	GF	GA	GD	Pts	Promotion or relegation
20	Oxford United	46	12	9	25	43	73	−30	45	
21	Cardiff City (R)	46	9	17	20	45	67	−22	44	Relegation to the Third Division
22	Blackpool (R)	46	8	17	21	49	77	−28	41	Relegation to the Third Division
23	Scunthorpe United (R)	46	9	12	25	40	74	−34	39	Relegation to the Third Division
24	Chesterfield (R)	46	7	15	24	34	63	−29	36	Relegation to the Third Division

Rules for classification: 1) Points; 2) Goal difference; 3) Goals scored
(R) Relegated

== Results ==
Chesterfield's score comes first

=== Legend ===
Win	Draw	Loss

=== Football League Division Two ===
Match	Date	Opponent	Venue	Result	Attendance	Scorers
1	7 August 1999	Colchester United	H	0–1	2,930	
2	14 August 1999	Burnley	A	1–2	10,615	Reeves 65' (pen)
3	21 August 1999	Cambridge United	H	4–2	2,816	Reeves 16', 56', 59', 79' (2 pens)
4	21 August 1999	Millwall	A	1–1	6,256	Reeves 74'
5	4 September 1999	Preston North End	A	2–0	8,506	Willis 51', Reeves 62'
6	11 September 1999	Stoke City	H	0–2	4,285	
7	18 September 1999	Reading	A	0–1	6,932	
8	25 September 1999	Scunthorpe United	A	0–0	4,321	
9	2 October 1999	Bournemouth	H	0–1	2,775	
10	9 October 1999	Blackpool	H	0–0	2,804	
11	16 October 1999	Wrexham	A	1–1	2,603	Beaumont 35'
12	19 October 1999	Notts County	A	0–1	4,749	
13	23 October 1999	Scunthorpe United	H	1–1	3,464	Howard 7'
14	2 November 1999	Wigan Athletic	A	0–3	4,379	
15	6 November 1999	Oldham Athletic	H	0–1	2,737	
16	12 November 1999	Cardiff City	A	1–2	4,863	Willis 89'
17	20 November 1999	Bristol Rovers	H	0–1	2,875	
18	27 November 1999	Oxford United	H	0–0	2,768	
19	3 December 1999	Colchester United	A	0–1	3,027	
20	7 December 1999	Bristol City	H	0–2	2,254	
21	10 December 1999	Brentford	A	1–1	4,286	Galloway 76'
22	26 December 1999	Luton Town	A	1–1	5,870	Reeves 74'
23	3 January 2000	Wycombe Wanderers	A	0–3	5,001	
24	8 January 2000	Brentford	H	1–0	2,746	Reeves 90'
25	15 January 2000	Burnley	H	1–1	4,214	Williams 73'
26	22 January 2000	Cambridge United	A	0–2	3,819	
27	29 January 2000	Millwall	H	2–0	3,198	Wilkinson 40', Beaumont 83'
28	1 February 2000	Gillingham	H	0–0	2,898	
29	5 February 2000	Bristol City	A	0–3	8,837	
30	12 February 2000	Preston North End	H	0–1	4,726	
31	12 February 2000	Oxford United	A	1–2	5,146	Williams 59'
32	26 February 2000	Reading	H	2–0	2,986	Payne 41', Breckin 71'
33	4 March 2000	Stoke City	A	1–5	11,968	Reeves 70'
34	11 March 2000	Wigan Athletic	H	1–1	3,106	Payne 21'
35	18 March 2000	Bristol Rovers	A	1–3	8,765	Williams 41'
36	21 March 2000	Cardiff City	H	1–1	2,348	Payne 32'
37	25 March 2000	Luton Town	H	1–3	2,597	Howard 76'
38	28 March 2000	Bury	H	0–1	1,903	
39	1 April 2000	Gillingham	A	0–1	6,772	
40	8 April 2000	Wycombe Wanderers	H	1–2	2,081	Reeves 27' (pen)
41	15 April 2000	Bury	A	1–1	3,021	Carss 75'
42	18 April 2000	Oldham Athletic	A	2–1	4,012	Williams 29', Willis 43'
43	22 April 2000	Wrexham	H	0–3	2,550	
44	25 April 2000	Bournemouth	A	1–1	3,481	Willis 17'
45	29 April 2000	Notts County	H	2–1	2,455	Reeves 66', 80'
46	6 May 2000	Blackpool	A	2–2	3,860	Williams 81', Reeves 90'

=== League Cup ===
Round	Date	Opponent	Venue	Result	Attendance	Scorers
R1 1st Leg	10 August 1999	Rochdale	A	2–1	1,910	Reeves 47', Hill 49' (o.g.)
R1 2nd Leg	24 August 1999	Rochdale	H	2–1	2,067	Bayliss 4' (o.g.), Ebdon 78'
R2 1st Leg	14 September 1999	Middlesbrough	H	0–0	4,941	
R2 2nd Leg	21 September 1999	Middlesbrough	A	1–2	25,602	Reeves 85'

=== FA Cup ===
Round	Date	Opponent	Venue	Result	Attendance	Scorers
R1	30 October 1999	Enfield	H	1–2	2,506	Lomas 49'

=== Football League Trophy ===
Round	Date	Opponent	Venue	Result	Attendance	Scorers
R2	11 January 2000	Rotherham United	A	4–1	1,997	Branston 4' (o.g.), Wilsterman 29' (o.g.), Wilkinson 58', Reeves 86'
Quarter final	25 January 2000	Scunthorpe United	A	2–1	2,532	Blatherwick 45', Reeves 70'
Semi final	15 February 2000	Stoke City	H	0–1	3,825	

== Squad ==
Appearances for competitive matches only

Pos.	Name	League		FA Cup		League Cup		Football League Trophy		Total	
Pos.	Name	Apps	Goals	Apps	Goals	Apps	Goals	Apps	Goals	Apps	Goals
FW	(Ghana) Junior Agogo	3(1)	0	0	0	0	0	0	0	3(1)	0
GK	(England) Joel Armstrong	3	0	0	0	0	0	1	0	4	0
DF	(England) Daniel Barrett	0(2)	0	0	0	0	0	0	0	0(2)	0
MF	(England) Chris Beaumont	32(1)	2	1	0	3(1)	0	3	0	39(2)	2
FW	(England) Chris Bettney	7(6)	0	0	0	3	0	0	0	10(6)	0
DF	(England) Steve Blatherwick	36	0	1	0	2	0	3	1	42	1
DF	(England) Ian Breckin	37(1)	1	1	0	4	0	3	0	45(1)	1
MF	(England) Tony Carss	24(7)	1	1	0	2	0	1(1)	0	28(8)	1
MF	(England) Tom Curtis	17(1)	0	0	0	3	0	0	0	20(1)	0
MF	(Wales) David D'Auria	4(1)	0	0	0	0	0	0	0	4(1)	0
FW	(England) Craig Dudley	0(2)	0	0	0	0	0	0	0	0(2)	0
MF	(Wales) Marcus Ebdon	10(1)	0	1	0	3	1	0	0	14(1)	1
MF	(England) Mick Galloway	14(1)	1	0	0	0	0	0	0	14(1)	1
GK	(England) Mark Gayle	29(1)	0	1	0	2(1)	0	1	0	31(2)	0
DF	(England) Jamie Hewitt	38(2)	0	1	0	4	0	3	0	46(2)	0
MF	(England) Paul Holland	4	0	0	0	2(1)	0	0	0	6(1)	0
FW	(England) Jonathan Howard	19(8)	2	1	0	0(1)	0	1	0	21(9)	2
GK	(England) Andy Leaning	6	0	0	0	2	0	0	0	8	0
FW	(England) Jason Lee	3(3)	0	0	0	0	0	0	0	3(3)	0
MF	(England) Jamie Lomas	10(6)	0	1	1	1(1)	0	1	0	12(7)	1
GK	(England) Carl Muggleton	5	0	0	0	0	0	0	0	5	0
DF	(England) Steve Payne	14(3)	3	0	0	0	0	0(1)	0	14(4)	3
MF	(England) Greg Pearce	8(2)	0	0	0	0	0	0	0	8(2)	0
MF	(England) Chris Perkins	29(2)	0	0	0	0	0	2(1)	0	31(3)	0
DF	(England) Neil Pointon	9(1)	0	0	0	0	0	2	0	9(1)	0
FW	(England) Dave Reeves	43	14	1	0	4	2	3	2	51	18
DF	(England) Michael Simpkins	8(1)	0	0	0	2(1)	0	0	0	10(2)	0
GK	(England) John Vaughan	3	0	0	0	0	0	1	0	4	0
FW	(England) Steve Wilkinson	15(7)	1	1	0	0	0	2(1)	1	18(7)	2
DF	(England) Danny Williams	3(2)	0	0	0	0(1)	0	0(1)	0	3(4)	0
MF	(England) Ryan Williams	30	5	0	0	0	0	3	0	33	5
MF	(England) Roger Willis	20(8)	4	0(1)	0	2(1)	0	0(1)	0	22(11)	4
DF	(England) Steve Woods	22(3)	0	0	0	4	0	0(1)	0	26(4)	0

== See also ==
- 1999–2000 in English football
