= 1996–97 Chesterfield F.C. season =

Chesterfield
1996–97 season
- Chairman: Norton Lea
- Manager: John Duncan
- Stadium: Saltergate
- Second Division: 10th
- FA Cup: Semi-finals
- League Cup: First round
- Auto Windscreens Shield: First round
- Top goalscorer: League: Howard (9); All: Howard (11)
- Average home league attendance: 4,639
Home colours

During the 1996–97 English football season, Chesterfield competed in the Football League Second Division.

== Season summary ==
For much of the season Chesterfield were in the Second Division play-off race, but a late slump saw them fall off the pace before a resurgence at the end of the season took them up to tenth - five points off the play-offs. In the FA Cup, Chesterfield reached the semi-finals for the first time in their history, before being knocked out by Premier League side Middlesbrough.

== Final league table ==
Pos	Team	Pld	W	D	L	GF	GA	GD	Pts
8	Wrexham	46	17	18	11	55	50	+5	69
9	Burnley	46	19	11	16	71	55	+16	68
10	Chesterfield	46	18	14	14	42	39	+3	68
11	Gillingham	46	19	10	17	60	59	+1	67
12	Walsall	46	19	10	17	54	53	+1	67

Rules for classification: In the Football League goals scored (GF) takes precedence over goal difference (GD).

== Results ==
Chesterfield's score comes first

=== Legend ===
Win	Draw	Loss

=== Football League Second Division ===
Date	Opponent	Venue	Result	Attendance	Scorers
17 August 1996	Blackpool	A	1–0	6,014	Holland
24 August 1996	Bury	H	1–2	3,763	Law (pen)
27 August 1996	Walsall	H	1–0	3,561	Howard
31 August 1996	Gillingham	A	1–0	5,934	Howard
7 September 1996	Brentford	H	0–2	3,643	
10 September 1996	Rotherham United	A	1–0	2,940	Howard
14 September 1996	Luton Town	A	1–0	4,763	Curtis (pen)
21 September 1996	Burnley	H	0–0	5,529	
28 September 1996	Bristol Rovers	A	0–2	5,008	
1 October 1996	Shrewsbury Town	H	2–1	3,299	Williams, Lormor
5 October 1996	Bristol City	H	1–1	4,438	Lormor
12 October 1996	Millwall	A	1–2	7,765	Beaumont
15 October 1996	Notts County	A	0–0	4,265	
19 October 1996	Crewe Alexandra	H	1–0	4,030	Scott
26 October 1996	York City	H	2–0	4,009	Scott (2)
29 October 1996	Stockport County	A	0–1	4,831	
2 November 1996	Wrexham	A	2–3	4,160	Curtis (pen), Lormor
9 November 1996	Preston North End	H	2–1	4,759	Lormor (pen), Williams
19 November 1996	Plymouth Argyle	A	3–0	4,237	Lormor, Davies, Holland
30 November 1996	York City	A	0–0	3,328	
3 December 1996	Peterborough United	H	2–1	2,805	Holland, Howard
14 December 1996	Wycombe Wanderers	A	0–1	4,610	
21 December 1996	Bournemouth	H	1–1	4,174	Lormor
11 January 1997	Bristol Rovers	H	1–0	3,305	Lormor
18 January 1997	Shrewsbury Town	A	0–2	2,659	
28 January 1997	Burnley	A	0–0	7,903	
1 February 1997	Preston North End	A	1–0	8,681	Morris
8 February 1997	Wrexham	H	0–0	6,738	
18 February 1997	Rotherham United	H	1–1	5,195	Lormor
22 February 1997	Plymouth Argyle	H	1–2	5,833	Howard
1 March 1997	Peterborough United	A	1–1	4,458	Howard
4 March 1997	Luton Town	H	1–1	3,731	Davies
11 March 1997	Bournemouth	A	0–3	3,368	
15 March 1997	Wycombe Wanderers	H	4–2	4,354	Howard (2), Hewitt, Hanson
22 March 1997	Bury	A	0–1	4,162	
29 March 1997	Blackpool	H	0–0	4,974	
1 April 1997	Walsall	A	1–1	3,784	Morris
5 April 1997	Gillingham	H	2–2	3,926	Morris, Howard
8 April 1997	Watford	H	0–0	4,258	
15 April 1997	Brentford	A	0–1	5,216	
19 April 1997	Millwall	H	1–0	5,935	Curtis
24 April 1997	Watford	A	2–0	6,411	Davies, Page (own goal)
26 April 1997	Crewe Alexandra	A	2–1	4,858	Morris, Ebdon
28 April 1997	Stockport County	H	0–1	8,690	
30 April 1997	Bristol City	A	0–2	16,195	
3 May 1997	Notts County	H	1–0	5,736	Williams

=== FA Cup ===
Round	Date	Opponent	Venue	Result	Attendance	Goalscorers
R1	16 November 1996	Bury	H	1–0	5,104	Williams
R2	7 December 1996	Scarborough	H	2–0	4,475	Davies, Lormor
R3	14 January 1997	Bristol City	H	2–0	5,193	Howard (2)
R4	4 February 1997	Bolton Wanderers	A	3–2	10,854	Davies (3)
R5	15 February 1997	Nottingham Forest	H	1–0	8,890	Curtis (pen)
QF	9 March 1997	Wrexham	H	1–0	8,735	Beaumont
SF	13 April 1997	Middlesbrough	N	3–3 (a.e.t.)	49,640	Morris, Dyche (pen), Hewitt
SFR	22 April 1997	Middlesbrough	N	0–3	30,339	

=== League Cup ===
Round	Date	Opponent	Venue	Result	Attendance	Goalscorers
R1 1st Leg	20 August 1996	Stockport County	A	1–2	3,088	Lormor
R1 2nd Leg	3 September 1996	Stockport County	H	1–2 (lost 2–4 on agg)	3,334	Gaughan

=== Football League Trophy ===
Round	Date	Opponent	Venue	Result	Attendance	Goalscorers
NR1	9 December 1996	Preston North End	H	0–2	1,169	

== Squad ==
Note: Flags indicate national team as defined under FIFA eligibility rules; some limited exceptions apply. Players may hold more than one non-FIFA nationality.

No.	Pos.	Nation	Player
—	GK	(England) ENG	Andy Leaning
—	GK	(England) ENG	Billy Mercer
—	DF	(England) ENG	Neil Allison
—	DF	(England) ENG	Darren Carr
—	DF	(England) ENG	Sean Connelly
—	DF	(England) ENG	Sean Dyche
—	DF	(England) ENG	Jamie Hewitt
—	DF	(England) ENG	Mark Jules
—	DF	(England) ENG	Andrew Mitchell
—	DF	(England) ENG	Lee Rogers
—	DF	(England) ENG	Mark Williams
—	MF	(England) ENG	Chris Beaumont
—	MF	(England) ENG	Jason Bowater

No.	Pos.	Nation	Player
—	MF	(England) ENG	Tom Curtis
—	MF	(England) ENG	Steven Gaughan
—	MF	(England) ENG	Paul Holland
—	MF	(England) ENG	Jamie Lomas
—	MF	(England) ENG	Chris Perkins
—	MF	(Wales) WAL	Marcus Ebdon
—	FW	(England) ENG	Kevin Davies
—	FW	(England) ENG	Dave Hanson (on loan from Leyton Orient)
—	FW	(England) ENG	Jonathan Howard
—	FW	(England) ENG	Tony Lormor
—	FW	(England) ENG	Gary Lund
—	FW	(England) ENG	Andy Mason
—	FW	(England) ENG	Andy Morris

=== Left club during season ===
Note: Flags indicate national team as defined under FIFA eligibility rules; some limited exceptions apply. Players may hold more than one non-FIFA nationality.

No.	Pos.	Nation	Player
—	GK	(England) ENG	Phil Morgan (on loan from Stoke City)
—	DF	(England) ENG	Nicky Law (to Hereford United)
—	MF	(England) ENG	Gary Patterson (on loan from Wycombe Wanderers)

No.	Pos.	Nation	Player
—	FW	(England) ENG	Iain Dunn (on loan from Huddersfield Town)
—	FW	(England) ENG	Andy Scott (on loan from Sheffield United)
