= 1990 Football League Fourth Division play-off final =

Association football match

- The match took place at Wembley Stadium.
- Event: 1989–90 Football League Fourth Division
Cambridge United	Chesterfield
1	0
- Date: 26 May 1990
- Venue: Wembley Stadium, London
- Referee: George Courtney
- Attendance: 26,404

The 1990 Football League Fourth Division play-off final was an association football match which was played on 26 May 1990 at Wembley Stadium, London, between Cambridge United and Chesterfield. The match was to determine the fourth and final team to gain promotion from the Football League Fourth Division, the fourth tier of English football, to the Third Division. The top three teams of the 1989–90 Football League Fourth Division season gained automatic promotion to the Third Division, while the clubs placed from fourth to seventh place in the table took part in play-offs. The winners of the play-off semi-finals competed for the final place in the 1990–91 season in the Third Division. Stockport County and Maidstone United F.C. were the losing semi-finalists. This was the first season that the play-off final was determined in a single match at Wembley and this was the first of the play-off finals to be played at the national stadium.

The referee for the match, played in sunny conditions in front of a crowd of 26,404, was George Courtney. An uneventful first half ended goalless. In the second half, and after having missed several chances, Dion Dublin scored in the 77th minute to give Cambridge the lead. Mick Leonard, the Chesterfield goalkeeper, was ruled to have carried the ball out after attempting to catch a misdirected shot, and conceded a corner. Dublin out-jumped Chesterfield's defenders to head in Chris Leadbitter's set piece and make it 1–0. With two minutes remaining, Jamie Hewitt's header was saved by the Cambridge goalkeeper John Vaughan. The match ended 1–0 and Cambridge secured promotion to the Third Division.

Chesterfield finished their following season in 18th position in the Fourth Division, with their manager Paul Hart being sacked mid-season. Cambridge United ended their next season as champions of the Third Division and gained promotion to the Second Division for the 1991–92 season.

== Route to the final ==
Football League Second Division final table, leading positions
Pos	Team	Pld	W	D	L	GF	GA	GD	Pts
1	Exeter City	46	28	5	13	83	48	+35	89
2	Grimsby Town	46	22	13	11	70	47	+23	79
3	Southend United	46	22	9	15	61	48	+13	75
4	Stockport County	46	21	11	14	68	62	+6	74
5	Maidstone United	46	22	7	17	77	61	+16	73
6	Cambridge United	46	21	10	15	76	66	+10	73
7	Chesterfield	46	19	14	13	63	50	+13	71

John Beck took over as manager of Cambridge United in January 1990 after Chris Turner resigned on medical grounds. Cambridge United's performance in the league was affected by their progression in the FA Cup where they were finally knocked out at the quarter-final stage by Crystal Palace, having played ten matches in the competition during the season. At that point, in March, they were in fourteenth place in the Fourth Division, but seven wins in their last nine games saw them make it into the play-offs on the final day of the regular season.

Cambridge United finished the regular 1990–91 season in sixth place in the Football League Fourth Division, the fourth tier of the English football league system, one place ahead of Chesterfield. Both therefore missed out on the three automatic places for promotion to the Third Division and instead took part in the play-offs, along with Stockport County and Maidstone United, to determine the fourth promoted team. Cambridge United finished two points behind Southend United (who were promoted in third place), four behind Grimsby Town (promoted as runners-up) and sixteen adrift of league winners Exeter City.

Chesterfield's opponents for their play-off semi-final were Stockport County. The first match of the two-legged tie took place at the Recreation Ground in Chesterfield on 13 May 1990. Calvin Plummer put the home side ahead in the 37th minute with a header before scoring from a John Chiedozie cross before half time. He completed his hat-trick on 55 minutes, striking through the legs of the Stockport goalkeeper to make it 3–0. Midway through the second half, John Ryan scored Chesterfield's fourth and the match ended 4–0. The second leg of the semi-final was held at Edgeley Park in Stockport three days later. Plummer scored his fourth play-off goal and Chiedozie doubled the lead for Chesterfield, who won 2–0 and progressed to the Wembley final with a 6–0 aggregate victory.

Cambridge United faced Maidstone United in their semi-final with the first leg being held at the Abbey Stadium in Cambridge on 13 May 1990. After a goalless first half, the home side took the lead six minutes after the interval from a penalty. Mark Golley was adjudged to have handled Lee Philpott's free kick in the Maidstone penalty area and Michael Cheetham converted the spot kick. With a minute remaining, Maidstone levelled the score when Mark Gall scored from a rebound after Dion Dublin's header struck his own crossbar, and the match ended 1–1. The second leg was played three days later at Watling Street in Dartford, Maidstone's home ground which they shared with Dartford F.C. The first 90 minutes ended goalless which sent the match into extra time; there, goals from Dublin and Cheetham (another penalty) ensured a 3–1 aggregate win for Cambridge and qualification for the final.

== Match ==
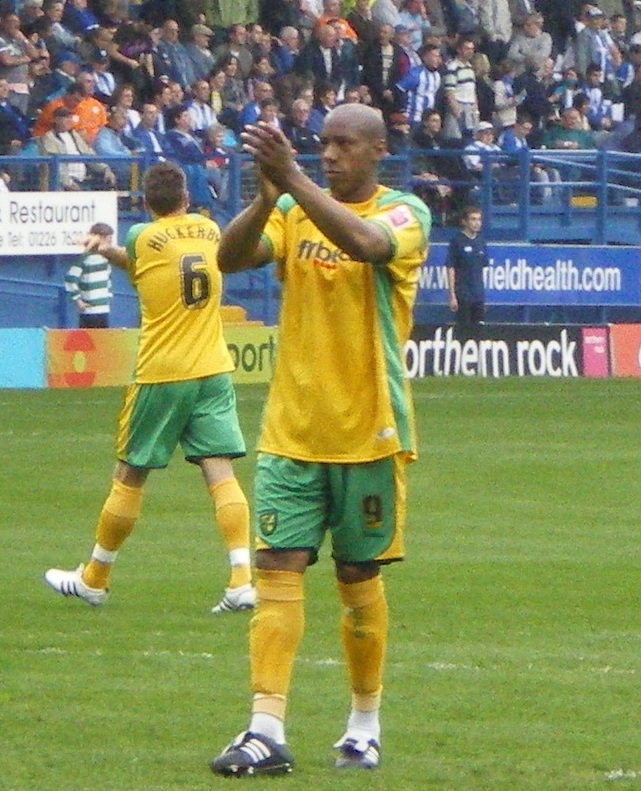
Dion Dublin (pictured in 2008) scored the only goal of the game.

=== Background ===
It was the first time either side had taken part in the play-offs. This was the first season that the play-off final was determined in a single match at Wembley and this was the first of the play-off finals to be played at Wembley Stadium. Neither club had played a competitive match at the national stadium. In the matches between the clubs during the regular season, Chesterfield won at the Abbey Stadium 1–0 in September 1989 while the return match in April 1990 ended in a 1–1 draw. Before the final, the Cambridge United team took a cold shower in preparation for the match. The referee for the final was George Courtney.

=== Summary ===
The match kicked off at around 3 p.m. on 26 May 1990 in front of a Wembley Stadium crowd of 26,404 in sunny conditions. Writing in The Guardian, Cynthia Bateman described that the first half of the match was "of such little excitement that the Chesterfield fans, too far away to take on the Cambridge supporters, began fighting among themselves". Keith Blackmore of The Times suggested that "for a long time [the game] was not a good advertisement for fourth division football". Although Cambridge had started the first half strongly, Chesterfield dominated the early stages of the second half. In the 60th minute, Cambridge made the first substitution of the match with Claridge coming on to replace John Taylor. Having missed several chances, Dublin scored in the 77th minute to give Cambridge the lead. Mick Leonard, the Chesterfield goalkeeper, was ruled to have carried the ball out after attempting to catch a misdirected shot, and conceded a corner. Dublin out-jumped Chesterfield's defenders to head in Leadbitter's set piece and make it 1–0. Almost immediately, Chesterfield replaced Chiedozie with Dave Waller. With six minutes of the match remaining, Cambridge made their second substitution, with Leadbitter being taken off for Mike Cook. Chesterfield had chances to score through Plummer and Waller but to no avail. In the 88th minute, Jamie Hewitt's header was saved by the Cambridge goalkeeper John Vaughan. Despite late chances to score for both teams, Cambridge secured promotion to the Third Division with a 1–0 victory.

=== Details ===
26 May 1990	Cambridge United	1–0	Chesterfield	Wembley Stadium, London
	Dublin 77'			Attendance: 26,404; Referee: George Courtney

GK	1	John Vaughan
RB	2	Andy Fensome
CB	3	Alan Kimble
CB	4	Colin Bailie
LB	5	Phil Chapple
RM	6	Danny O'Shea
CM	7	Michael Cheetham
CM	8	Chris Leadbitter (substituted off) 84'
FW	9	Dion Dublin
FW	10	John Taylor (substituted off) 60'
LM	11	Lee Philpott
Substitutes:
MF	12	Mike Cook (substituted in) 84'
FW	13	Steve Claridge (substituted in) 60'
Manager:
John Beck

GK	1	Mick Leonard
RB	2	Lee Francis
CB	3	John Ryan
CB	4	Sean Dyche
LB	5	Tony Brien
RM	6	Bryn Gunn
CM	7	Calvin Plummer
CM	8	Jamie Hewitt
FW	9	John Chiedozie (substituted off) 77'
FW	10	Lee Rogers
LM	11	Andy Morris
Substitutes:
FW	12	Dave Waller (substituted in) 77'
Manager:
Paul Hart

== Post-match ==
Beck was satisfied with the new play-off format: "If you had to choose how to get promoted, you would probably choose this way ... if you knew you were going to go up." His counterpart Paul Hart was less enthusiastic about the approach, suggesting that the team in fourth place should secure automatic promotion, but conceded that the play-offs had enabled his side "a second bit of the cherry". He was sacked in January 1991 with Chesterfield one point above the bottom of the league.

Hart was replaced by Chris McMenemy (son of Lawrie McMenemy) as head coach and took on the manager's role in April. He led Chesterfield to finish in 18th position in the table. Cambridge United ended their following season as champions of the Third Division and gained promotion to the Second Division for the 1991–92 season. Decades later, Dublin described his goal as the "most memorable" of his career, saying "It’s my favourite – because it was the hard work to get to that situation ... that goal will always mean more than any of the others."
