= Andrew Mitchell (disambiguation) =

Andrew Mitchell is a British Conservative politician.

Andrew Mitchell may also refer to:

== Noblemen and public officials ==
- Sir Andrew Mitchell, 2nd Baronet (c. 1706–1764), of the Mitchell baronets
- Andrew Mitchell (diplomat, born 1708) (1708–1771), British diplomat and politician
- Andrew Jonathan Mitchell (born 1967), British ambassador and civil servant
- Andy Mitchell (politician) (born 1953), Canadian political figure; Liberal from Ontario; MP for Parry Sound-Muskoka from 1993 to 2006

== Sports ==
- Andrew Mitchell (American football) (born 1985), American tackle for the Cincinnati Bengals
- Andrew Mitchell (footballer, born 1879), Scottish footballer who played for Albion Rovers and Woolwich Arsenal in late 1890s
- Andrew Mitchell (footballer, born 1992), Northern Irish footballer who plays for Linfield
- Andrew Mitchell (full-back) (fl. 1892–1894), Scottish footballer; played for Airdrieonians, Newton Heath and Burton Swifts in 1890s
- Andrew Mitchell (hurler) (born 1980), Irish hurler
- Andrew Mitchell (umpire), Australian rules football umpire
- Andy Mitchell (footballer, born 1907) (1907–1971), English football player for Darlington and Manchester United
- Andy Mitchell (footballer, born 1976), English football player for Chesterfield
- Andy Mitchell (footballer, born 1990), English football player for Chester City
- Drew Mitchell (born 1984), Australian rugby union player

== Other ==
- Andrew J. Mitchell, American philosopher
- Andrew Mitchell (Royal Navy officer) (1757–1806), Scottish admiral
- Andrew Ronald Mitchell (1921–2007), British applied mathematician and numerical analyst
- Andy Mitchell, lead vocalist with the reformed The Yardbirds
- Andy Mitchell, character in The Pendragon Adventure series by D. J. MacHale

== See also ==
- Mitchell (disambiguation)#People
