= 2007–08 Football Conference =

Football Conference
- Season: 2007-08

The 2007–08 season was the 29th season of the Football Conference.

== Conference Premier ==
A total of 24 teams contested the division, including 19 sides from last season, one relegated from the Football League Two, two promoted from the Conference North and two promoted from the Conference South.

=== Promotion and relegation ===
Teams promoted from 2006–07 Conference North

- Droylsden
- Farsley Celtic

Teams promoted from 2006–07 Conference South

- Histon
- Salisbury City

Teams relegated from 2006–07 League Two

- Torquay United

Boston United were also relegated from the Football League, but were placed in the Conference North due to financial problems. Altrincham, who had finished in the relegation zone in the 2006–07 season, were reprieved in order for the division to remain at 24 teams.

=== Overall ===
Aldershot Town made a return to the Football League, Aldershot F.C. having actually folded during the league season of 1991–92 league season. Its successor Aldershot Town F.C., however, actually made an exceptionally bad start of the season, losing two of their first three home games, but after that they gained a form that produced Football Conference records, such as their 31 wins and the 101 points, wrapping up the title and the promotion well ahead of the end of the season. A key factor was their ability to avoid drawn matches, of which they only had eight. And even then six of them occurred during the nine games when they were wrapping up the title.

The play-offs saw local rivals Exeter City and Torquay United facing each other for a chance to play for a promotion to the Football League. Torquay had the upper hand at first, winning the first leg on Exeter's soil with 1–2, and they on home ground they were leading 1–0 (3–1 aggregate) with just 20 minutes left, when Exeter ended their hopes with a burst of four goals to wrap up the series with a 5–3 aggregate win. Exeter eventually won 1–0 over Cambridge United at Wembley to seal their return to the League.

As usual, the biggest average crowds were seen in Oxford, with an average of 4,728 spectators per game and an aggregate of 108,750, but actually they fell fifth in highest attendances, with the West Country derby between Exeter City and Torquay United drawing the biggest crowd of the season with 7,839 spectators, followed by the Cambridgeshire derby of Cambridge United v Histon with 7,125, another West Country derby between Torquay and Exeter with 6,021 and even Aldershot Town v Weymouth with 5,980, leaving Oxford behind in their top drawing match against Crawley Town with their 5,900 spectators. Droylsden had the fewest spectators, with an aggregate of 14,800, meaning an average crowd of 643 spectators, with a high of 1,178 against Altrincham.

=== League table ===
Conference Premier
- Season: 2007–08
- Champions: Aldershot Town (1st Football Conference title)
- Promoted to League Two: Aldershot Town, Exeter City
- Relegated to Conference North/Conference South: Droylsden, Farsley Celtic, Stafford Rangers
- Relegated to Level 8: Halifax Town
- Promoted for the next season: Barrow, Eastbourne Borough, Kettering Town, Lewes
- Matches: 552
- Goals: 1,559 (2.82 per match)
- Top goalscorer: Stuart Fleetwood (Forest Green Rovers), 28
- Biggest home win: Kidderminster Harriers – Stafford Rangers 6–0 (4 March 2008)
- Biggest away win: Weymouth – Forest Green Rovers 0–6 (4 March 2008)
- Highest scoring: Ebbsfleet – Kidderminster 5–4 (15 September 2007); Histon – Torquay United 4–5 (18 September 2007)
- Longest winning run: ?
- Longest unbeaten run: ?
- Longest losing run: ?
- Highest attendance: Exeter City v Torquay United, 7,839 (26 December 2007)
- Lowest attendance: Droylsden v Ebbsfleet, 252 (17 April 2008)
- Average attendance: 1,799 (– 6% compared with the previous season)

| Pos | Team | Pld | W | D | L | GF | GA | GD | Pts | Qualification or relegation |
|---|---|---|---|---|---|---|---|---|---|---|
| 1 | Aldershot Town (C, P) | 46 | 31 | 8 | 7 | 82 | 48 | +34 | 101 | Promotion to Football League Two |
| 2 | Cambridge United | 46 | 25 | 11 | 10 | 68 | 41 | +27 | 86 | Qualification for the Conference Premier play-offs |
| 3 | Torquay United | 46 | 26 | 8 | 12 | 83 | 57 | +26 | 86 | Qualification for the Conference Premier play-offs |
| 4 | Exeter City (O, P) | 46 | 22 | 17 | 7 | 83 | 58 | +25 | 83 | Qualification for the Conference Premier play-offs |
| 5 | Burton Albion | 46 | 23 | 12 | 11 | 79 | 56 | +23 | 81 | Qualification for the Conference Premier play-offs |
| 6 | Stevenage Borough | 46 | 24 | 7 | 15 | 82 | 55 | +27 | 79 | |
| 7 | Histon | 46 | 20 | 12 | 14 | 76 | 67 | +9 | 72 | |
| 8 | Forest Green Rovers | 46 | 19 | 14 | 13 | 76 | 59 | +17 | 71 | |
| 9 | Oxford United | 46 | 20 | 11 | 15 | 56 | 48 | +8 | 71 | |
| 10 | Grays Athletic | 46 | 19 | 13 | 14 | 58 | 47 | +11 | 70 | |
| 11 | Ebbsfleet United | 46 | 19 | 12 | 15 | 65 | 61 | +4 | 69 | |
| 12 | Salisbury City | 46 | 18 | 14 | 14 | 70 | 60 | +10 | 68 | |
| 13 | Kidderminster Harriers | 46 | 19 | 10 | 17 | 74 | 57 | +17 | 67 | |
| 14 | York City | 46 | 17 | 11 | 18 | 71 | 74 | −3 | 62 | |
| 15 | Crawley Town | 46 | 19 | 9 | 18 | 73 | 67 | +6 | 60 (Note: Crawley Town were deducted 6 points for a breach of financial regulations.) | |
| 16 | Rushden & Diamonds | 46 | 15 | 14 | 17 | 55 | 55 | 0 | 59 | |
| 17 | Woking | 46 | 12 | 17 | 17 | 53 | 61 | −8 | 53 | |
| 18 | Weymouth | 46 | 11 | 13 | 22 | 53 | 73 | −20 | 46 | |
| 19 | Northwich Victoria | 46 | 11 | 11 | 24 | 52 | 78 | −26 | 44 | |
| 20 | Halifax Town | 46 | 12 | 16 | 18 | 61 | 70 | −9 | 42 (Note: Halifax Town were deducted 10 points for entering administration and later resigned from the Conference due to financial problems. These resulted in the folding of the club, but it was soon reformed with name FC Halifax Town, and was able to play competitive football in Northern Premier League Division One North, on Level 8 of the English football league system.) | Club resigned and folded |
| 21 | Altrincham | 46 | 9 | 14 | 23 | 56 | 82 | −26 | 41 | |
| 22 | Farsley Celtic (R) | 46 | 10 | 9 | 27 | 48 | 86 | −38 | 39 | Relegation to Conference North |
| 23 | Stafford Rangers (R) | 46 | 5 | 10 | 31 | 42 | 99 | −57 | 25 | Relegation to Conference North |
| 24 | Droylsden (R) | 46 | 5 | 9 | 32 | 46 | 103 | −57 | 24 | Relegation to Conference North |

Rules for classification: 1) points; 2) goal difference; 3) number of goals scored.
(C) Champions; (O) Play-off winners; (P) Promoted; (R) Relegated

=== Locations ===
Locations of the Conference Premier 2007–08 teams

=== Results ===
| Home \ Away | ALD | ALT | BRT | CAM | CRA | DRO | EBB | EXE | FAR | FGR | GRY | HAL | HIS | KID | NOR | OXF | R&D | SAL | STA | STB | TOR | WEY | WOK | YOR |
|---|---|---|---|---|---|---|---|---|---|---|---|---|---|---|---|---|---|---|---|---|---|---|---|---|
| Aldershot Town | | 2–1 | 1–0 | 0–0 | 0–1 | 3–1 | 2–0 | 2–0 | 4–3 | 0–1 | 3–2 | 1–0 | 3–1 | 2–1 | 5–0 | 1–0 | 2–1 | 2–1 | 4–3 | 3–1 | 0–3 | 0–0 | 2–1 | 2–0 |
| Altrincham | 1–2 | | 0–0 | 0–3 | 2–3 | 3–2 | 1–3 | 1–4 | 0–0 | 1–0 | 0–1 | 3–3 | 1–2 | 2–1 | 1–2 | 1–3 | 1–2 | 3–1 | 2–0 | 1–5 | 1–1 | 3–2 | 2–2 | 2–2 |
| Burton Albion | 2–0 | 2–1 | | 1–2 | 1–0 | 3–0 | 1–1 | 4–4 | 1–0 | 1–1 | 2–3 | 2–1 | 1–3 | 0–2 | 4–1 | 1–2 | 2–1 | 4–3 | 2–1 | 3–0 | 3–1 | 2–1 | 2–0 | 4–3 |
| Cambridge United | 1–1 | 2–1 | 0–0 | | 2–1 | 5–0 | 1–1 | 0–1 | 5–1 | 2–0 | 1–0 | 2–2 | 1–0 | 0–3 | 2–1 | 2–1 | 1–0 | 1–1 | 1–2 | 2–1 | 2–0 | 0–0 | 1–0 | 2–0 |
| Crawley Town | 0–1 | 0–1 | 1–1 | 2–1 | | 5–0 | 1–2 | 2–2 | 4–1 | 3–0 | 2–1 | 0–4 | 1–0 | 0–4 | 2–1 | 2–0 | 4–1 | 1–1 | 1–1 | 2–1 | 2–3 | 1–1 | 5–3 | 6–1 |
| Droylsden | 2–2 | 0–2 | 0–2 | 0–2 | 1–2 | | 1–1 | 2–3 | 0–3 | 5–3 | 1–2 | 2–0 | 0–1 | 1–0 | 1–3 | 3–1 | 1–4 | 0–0 | 1–1 | 0–3 | 1–2 | 1–3 | 1–1 | 3–4 |
| Ebbsfleet United | 2–2 | 2–0 | 2–1 | 2–1 | 1–0 | 2–0 | | 1–1 | 3–1 | 0–2 | 4–1 | 1–0 | 0–1 | 5–4 | 2–1 | 1–3 | 0–3 | 2–1 | 2–1 | 0–1 | 2–1 | 4–1 | 1–1 | 1–2 |
| Exeter City | 1–1 | 2–1 | 1–4 | 1–1 | 2–0 | 1–1 | 1–1 | | 2–1 | 3–3 | 1–0 | 1–0 | 2–1 | 1–0 | 2–1 | 2–0 | 2–2 | 4–2 | 4–1 | 4–0 | 4–3 | 0–0 | 2–2 | 1–1 |
| Farsley Celtic | 1–3 | 1–1 | 0–1 | 2–1 | 1–5 | 1–2 | 1–1 | 0–2 | | 0–2 | 1–3 | 3–0 | 1–3 | 1–1 | 2–1 | 0–1 | 0–1 | 2–2 | 1–0 | 0–0 | 1–2 | 4–2 | 3–0 | 1–4 |
| Forest Green Rovers | 2–3 | 3–1 | 3–1 | 3–1 | 1–0 | 3–2 | 2–2 | 1–1 | 2–2 | | 1–2 | 2–0 | 3–1 | 2–2 | 4–1 | 0–0 | 0–1 | 0–3 | 1–2 | 4–2 | 2–2 | 3–2 | 2–1 | 1–2 |
| Grays Athletic | 2–1 | 1–0 | 0–0 | 2–1 | 2–1 | 3–1 | 1–1 | 0–2 | 1–0 | 0–1 | | 3–3 | 0–1 | 5–1 | 3–1 | 0–0 | 3–0 | 1–1 | 5–1 | 0–2 | 2–0 | 0–2 | 1–1 | 0–2 |
| Halifax Town | 0–0 | 2–2 | 2–2 | 1–2 | 3–0 | 3–0 | 1–0 | 0–3 | 2–0 | 1–1 | 0–0 | | 0–0 | 1–6 | 3–1 | 0–3 | 1–1 | 1–1 | 0–0 | 1–2 | 3–2 | 2–1 | 1–0 | 2–2 |
| Histon | 1–2 | 1–0 | 2–2 | 1–0 | 3–0 | 2–0 | 3–2 | 2–2 | 1–2 | 2–2 | 2–2 | 1–3 | | 2–1 | 1–1 | 1–0 | 2–1 | 2–0 | 3–3 | 1–4 | 4–5 | 2–2 | 0–1 | 3–1 |
| Kidderminster Harriers | 1–2 | 1–1 | 4–1 | 1–0 | 1–1 | 3–1 | 2–1 | 4–0 | 2–1 | 1–0 | 1–0 | 1–0 | 1–1 | | 0–0 | 0–2 | 2–0 | 1–2 | 6–0 | 0–2 | 2–5 | 0–2 | 1–1 | 3–0 |
| Northwich Victoria | 1–2 | 1–2 | 0–2 | 0–2 | 2–0 | 3–3 | 3–3 | 0–0 | 4–0 | 1–1 | 1–0 | 2–2 | 1–3 | 1–1 | | 1–0 | 1–0 | 0–1 | 4–3 | 0–2 | 1–3 | 2–2 | 1–3 | 0–1 |
| Oxford United | 2–3 | 4–0 | 0–3 | 1–2 | 1–0 | 1–0 | 0–0 | 2–2 | 5–1 | 1–0 | 0–0 | 1–1 | 3–0 | 0–0 | 0–1 | | 1–0 | 2–1 | 2–1 | 2–1 | 3–3 | 0–1 | 0–0 | 1–1 |
| Rushden & Diamonds | 1–1 | 1–0 | 0–0 | 1–2 | 1–1 | 0–0 | 0–1 | 0–2 | 1–0 | 1–2 | 1–1 | 2–2 | 2–3 | 0–1 | 1–0 | 5–0 | | 0–0 | 1–1 | 0–0 | 2–1 | 3–2 | 2–1 | 1–1 |
| Salisbury City | 0–4 | 3–3 | 2–0 | 0–2 | 4–1 | 3–1 | 2–1 | 2–0 | 1–1 | 0–0 | 0–1 | 1–0 | 3–3 | 0–1 | 2–0 | 3–1 | 1–1 | | 1–0 | 1–0 | 0–0 | 1–1 | 2–1 | 3–0 |
| Stafford Rangers | 1–2 | 1–1 | 0–3 | 1–1 | 1–3 | 2–1 | 0–1 | 1–5 | 0–2 | 1–3 | 0–2 | 2–3 | 1–1 | 1–3 | 0–0 | 0–1 | 0–1 | 1–5 | | 1–2 | 0–2 | 2–1 | 0–1 | 0–4 |
| Stevenage Borough | 3–1 | 2–1 | 3–3 | 1–2 | 3–1 | 5–0 | 3–1 | 0–1 | 4–0 | 0–0 | 0–0 | 2–3 | 2–1 | 2–1 | 1–2 | 0–0 | 2–1 | 3–1 | 3–0 | | 1–3 | 3–0 | 1–1 | 3–2 |
| Torquay United | 1–2 | 1–1 | 1–2 | 1–2 | 1–2 | 2–1 | 3–1 | 1–0 | 0–1 | 1–0 | 0–0 | 3–1 | 1–0 | 1–0 | 1–0 | 3–2 | 3–2 | 4–0 | 2–0 | 4–2 | | 3–2 | 2–0 | 0–0 |
| Weymouth | 0–2 | 2–2 | 1–2 | 2–2 | 1–2 | 2–1 | 2–0 | 3–1 | 0–0 | 0–6 | 1–1 | 2–1 | 0–1 | 2–1 | 2–0 | 0–1 | 1–2 | 0–3 | 1–3 | 1–0 | 0–0 | | 0–1 | 1–2 |
| Woking | 0–1 | 2–0 | 2–1 | 0–0 | 1–1 | 1–1 | 1–0 | 1–1 | 2–0 | 1–1 | 0–1 | 1–0 | 3–3 | 3–0 | 2–3 | 1–2 | 1–1 | 3–2 | 2–2 | 0–2 | 0–1 | 3–0 | | 0–3 |
| York City | 2–0 | 2–2 | 0–0 | 1–2 | 1–1 | 2–1 | 0–1 | 3–2 | 4–1 | 0–2 | 2–0 | 3–2 | 1–4 | 2–2 | 1–1 | 0–1 | 2–3 | 1–3 | 2–0 | 0–2 | 0–1 | 2–0 | 2–3 | |

Updated to match(es) played on unknown. Source: Soccerbase
Legend: Blue = home team win; Yellow = draw; Red = away team win.

=== Play-offs ===
Semifinals; 1st leg 1/2 May; 2nd leg 5/6 May
2nd | Cambridge United | 2 | 2 | 4
5th | Burton Albion | 2 | 1 | 3
3rd | Torquay United | 2 | 1 | 3
4th | Exeter City | 1 | 4 | 5

Final at Wembley; 18 May 2008
2nd | Cambridge United | 0
4th | Exeter City | 1

==== Semifinals ====
2 May 2008
19:45
1st Leg

| Burton Albion | 2–2 | Cambridge United |
|---|---|---|
| Clare 66' (pen.); Stride 69' | Report | McEvilly 78' (pen.), 84' |

Pirelli Stadium, Burton upon Trent
Attendance: 5,757
Referee: S Hooper
6 May 2008
19:30
2nd Leg

| Cambridge United | 2–1 | Burton Albion |
|---|---|---|
| Wolleaston 1', 62' | Report | Clare 14' |

Abbey Stadium, Cambridge
Attendance: 7,276
Referee: M Mullarkey

Cambridge United won 4–3 on Aggregate.

1 May 2008
19:45
1st Leg

| Exeter City | 1–2 | Torquay United |
|---|---|---|
| Carlisle 76' | Report | Sills 37'; Zebroski 90+1' |

St James Park, Exeter
Attendance: 8,276
5 May 2008
2nd Leg

| Torquay United | 1–4 | Exeter City |
|---|---|---|
| Hill 59' | Report | Harley 70'; Watson 81' (pen.); Logan 89'; Carlisle 90+4' |

Plainmoor, Torquay
Attendance: 6,015
Referee: C Sarginson

Exeter City won 5–3 on Aggregate.

==== Play-Off Final ====
18 May 2008
16:00

| Cambridge United | 0–1 | Exeter City |
|---|---|---|
| | Report | Edwards 22' |

Wembley Stadium, London
Attendance: 42,511
Referee: Craig Pawson

=== Top scorers in order of league goals ===
| Rank | Player | Club | League | Play-offs | FA Cup | FA Trophy | Total |
|---|---|---|---|---|---|---|---|
| 1 | (England) Stuart Fleetwood | Forest Green Rovers | 28 | 0 | 6 | 2 | 36 |
| 2 | (Wales) Steve Morison | Stevenage Borough | 22 | 0 | 0 | 1 | 23 |
| 3 | (England) Colin Little | Altrincham | 21 | 0 | 1 | 1 | 24 |
| 4 | (England) John Grant | Aldershot Town | 20 | 0 | 0 | 5 | 25 |
| = | (England) Jon Shaw | Halifax Town | 20 | 0 | 1 | 4 | 25 |
| 6 | (Republic of Ireland) Daryl Clare | Burton Albion | 19 | 3 | 2 | 3 | 24 |
| = | (England) Tim Sills | Torquay United | 19 | 1 | 0 | 2 | 22 |
| 8 | (England) Richard Logan | Exeter City | 18 | 1 | 0 | 0 | 19 |
| = | (England) Chris Zebroski | Torquay United | 18 | 2 | 0 | 0 | 20 |
| = | (England) Matt Tubbs | Salisbury City | 18 | 0 | 0 | 0 | 18 |
| 11 | (England) Scott Rendell | Cambridge United | 17 | 0 | 4 | 2 | 19 |
| = | (England) Mark Beesley | Forest Green Rovers / Cambridge United | 17 | 0 | 2 | 0 | 19 |
| = | (England) Iyseden Christie | Kidderminster Harriers | 17 | 0 | 0 | 0 | 17 |

== Conference North ==
Conference North
- Season: 2007–08
- Champions: Kettering Town (1st Football Conference North title)
- Direct promotion: Kettering Town
- Promoted through play-offs: Barrow
- demoted to Level 7, expelled or reformed: Leigh RMI; Nuneaton (reformed and demoted); Boston United (expelled)
- Promoted for the next season: Fleetwood Town, Gateshead, King's Lynn
- Matches: 462
- Biggest home win: Blyth Spartans – Worcester City 6–0 (12 April 2008); Kettering Town – Vauxhall Motors 6–0 (18 August 2007); Stalybridge Celtic – Redditch United 6–0 (26 April 2008)
- Biggest away win: Vauxhall Motors – Kettering Town 0–6 (1 March 2008)
- Highest scoring: Hyde United – Vauxhall Motors 6–3 (13 August 2007)
- Longest winning run: ?
- Longest unbeaten run: ?
- Longest losing run: ?
- Highest attendance: ?
- Lowest attendance: ?
- Average attendance: ?

=== Promotion and relegation ===
A total of 22 teams contested the division, including 17 sides from last season, one relegated from Football League Two, two relegated from the Conference National and two promoted from the Northern Premier League.

Teams promoted from 2006–07 Northern Premier League Premier Division

- Burscough
- AFC Telford United

Teams relegated from 2006–07 Conference National

- Tamworth
- Southport

Teams relegated from 2006–07 League Two

- Boston United

Boston United were transferred down two divisions due to financial problems. At the end of the season still under entering administration, Boston United were relegated another division down.

=== League table ===
| Pos | Team | Pld | W | D | L | GF | GA | GD | Pts | Promotion or relegation |
|---|---|---|---|---|---|---|---|---|---|---|
| 1 | Kettering Town (C, P) | 42 | 30 | 7 | 5 | 93 | 34 | +59 | 97 | Promotion to Conference Premier |
| 2 | AFC Telford United | 42 | 24 | 8 | 10 | 70 | 43 | +27 | 80 | Qualification for the Conference North play-offs |
| 3 | Stalybridge Celtic | 42 | 25 | 4 | 13 | 88 | 51 | +37 | 79 | Qualification for the Conference North play-offs |
| 4 | Southport | 42 | 22 | 11 | 9 | 77 | 50 | +27 | 77 | Qualification for the Conference North play-offs |
| 5 | Barrow (O, P) | 42 | 21 | 13 | 8 | 70 | 39 | +31 | 76 | Qualification for the Conference North play-offs |
| 6 | Harrogate Town | 42 | 21 | 11 | 10 | 55 | 41 | +14 | 74 | |
| 7 | Nuneaton Borough (R) | 42 | 19 | 14 | 9 | 58 | 40 | +18 | 71 | Demoted to the Southern League Division One Midlands (Note: In June 2008, Nuneaton Borough went into liquidation but were immediately reformed as Nuneaton Town. They underwent a double demotion to the Southern League Division One Midlands, Level 8 of the English football league system.) |
| 8 | Burscough | 42 | 19 | 8 | 15 | 62 | 58 | +4 | 65 | |
| 9 | Hyde United | 42 | 20 | 3 | 19 | 84 | 66 | +18 | 63 | |
| 10 | Boston United (R) | 42 | 17 | 8 | 17 | 65 | 57 | +8 | 59 | Demoted to the Northern Premier League Premier Division (Note: Boston United were demoted to the Northern Premier League Premier Division for failing exit administration by the end of the season.) |
| 11 | Gainsborough Trinity | 42 | 15 | 12 | 15 | 62 | 65 | −3 | 57 | |
| 12 | Worcester City | 42 | 14 | 12 | 16 | 48 | 68 | −20 | 54 | Transferred to Conference South |
| 13 | Redditch United | 42 | 15 | 8 | 19 | 41 | 58 | −17 | 53 | |
| 14 | Workington | 42 | 13 | 11 | 18 | 52 | 56 | −4 | 50 | |
| 15 | Tamworth | 42 | 13 | 11 | 18 | 53 | 59 | −6 | 50 | |
| 16 | Alfreton Town | 42 | 12 | 11 | 19 | 49 | 54 | −5 | 47 | |
| 17 | Solihull Moors | 42 | 12 | 11 | 19 | 50 | 76 | −26 | 47 | |
| 18 | Blyth Spartans | 42 | 12 | 10 | 20 | 52 | 62 | −10 | 46 | |
| 19 | Hinckley United | 42 | 11 | 12 | 19 | 48 | 69 | −21 | 45 | |
| 20 | Hucknall Town | 42 | 11 | 6 | 25 | 53 | 75 | −22 | 39 | Reprieved from relegation (Note: Hucknall Town and Vauxhall Motors were reprieved from relegation due to the demotions of Nuneaton Borough and Boston United.) |
| 21 | Vauxhall Motors | 42 | 7 | 7 | 28 | 42 | 100 | −58 | 28 | Reprieved from relegation |
| 22 | Leigh RMI (R) | 42 | 6 | 8 | 28 | 36 | 87 | −51 | 26 | Relegation to the Northern Premier League Premier Division |

(C) Champions; (O) Play-off winners; (P) Promoted; (R) Relegated

=== Locations ===
Locations of the Football Conference North 2007–2008 teams

=== Results ===
| Home \ Away | TEL | ALF | BRW | BLY | BOS | BUR | GAI | HAR | HIN | HUC | HYD | KET | LEI | NUN | RED | SOL | SOU | STL | TAM | VAU | WRC | WRK |
|---|---|---|---|---|---|---|---|---|---|---|---|---|---|---|---|---|---|---|---|---|---|---|
| AFC Telford United | | 3–0 | 0–2 | 3–1 | 1–1 | 1–0 | 2–1 | 3–1 | 3–0 | 1–0 | 2–1 | 0–1 | 6–1 | 0–0 | 1–0 | 4–0 | 1–5 | 3–0 | 4–1 | 3–2 | 1–1 | 3–3 |
| Alfreton Town | 0–1 | | 0–0 | 1–1 | 2–1 | 1–2 | 3–1 | 1–2 | 0–0 | 2–1 | 0–3 | 1–2 | 1–0 | 1–3 | 0–0 | 0–0 | 1–2 | 3–4 | 1–2 | 4–0 | 3–1 | 2–0 |
| Barrow | 4–0 | 2–1 | | 1–1 | 1–0 | 4–1 | 4–1 | 2–2 | 0–1 | 2–1 | 1–0 | 1–1 | 1–2 | 0–1 | 2–0 | 5–1 | 1–0 | 1–3 | 2–0 | 4–1 | 1–0 | 1–1 |
| Blyth Spartans | 1–2 | 2–0 | 2–3 | | 2–1 | 1–4 | 1–1 | 0–1 | 1–3 | 1–2 | 0–2 | 2–0 | 2–0 | 1–0 | 2–4 | 1–2 | 1–0 | 0–1 | 1–1 | 0–2 | 6–0 | 0–2 |
| Boston United | 2–1 | 2–1 | 2–1 | 3–2 | | 0–1 | 0–1 | 0–1 | 1–1 | 2–3 | 2–1 | 0–1 | 5–1 | 1–1 | 3–0 | 2–0 | 1–2 | 3–1 | 1–0 | 5–1 | 2–2 | 2–0 |
| Burscough | 1–3 | 1–1 | 2–1 | 2–2 | 2–1 | | 2–2 | 2–1 | 1–1 | 2–1 | 3–2 | 1–1 | 5–2 | 2–0 | 0–2 | 2–2 | 1–1 | 0–2 | 2–3 | 0–0 | 2–1 | 0–1 |
| Gainsborough Trinity | 1–1 | 2–2 | 1–1 | 4–0 | 1–3 | 0–1 | | 0–1 | 2–2 | 4–1 | 3–3 | 3–1 | 2–1 | 1–1 | 3–0 | 0–2 | 0–3 | 2–1 | 1–0 | 3–0 | 1–1 | 1–1 |
| Harrogate Town | 1–0 | 0–1 | 2–2 | 0–1 | 3–2 | 0–1 | 3–1 | | 1–1 | 0–0 | 2–1 | 0–0 | 0–0 | 1–2 | 2–0 | 1–0 | 1–0 | 2–0 | 3–2 | 2–0 | 0–1 | 1–1 |
| Hinckley United | 1–1 | 1–0 | 1–2 | 1–1 | 0–1 | 1–0 | 1–2 | 2–3 | | 2–1 | 2–1 | 0–0 | 3–1 | 0–0 | 1–2 | 0–1 | 2–3 | 0–3 | 2–0 | 0–1 | 2–4 | 2–1 |
| Hucknall Town | 0–2 | 2–2 | 0–1 | 0–3 | 1–2 | 0–2 | 0–1 | 0–1 | 1–1 | | 1–4 | 0–2 | 3–0 | 2–2 | 1–2 | 2–2 | 1–2 | 0–3 | 3–1 | 2–0 | 5–0 | 1–3 |
| Hyde United | 1–0 | 0–2 | 2–1 | 2–4 | 2–1 | 1–0 | 3–0 | 2–2 | 5–2 | 4–2 | | 0–3 | 1–1 | 2–0 | 4–0 | 3–0 | 1–3 | 1–3 | 1–2 | 6–3 | 3–1 | 1–2 |
| Kettering Town | 3–0 | 1–1 | 3–1 | 1–0 | 3–0 | 0–1 | 2–1 | 3–1 | 5–2 | 3–2 | 0–2 | | 3–0 | 3–2 | 2–0 | 6–1 | 5–2 | 0–1 | 2–1 | 6–0 | 3–0 | 3–1 |
| Leigh RMI | 0–3 | 1–0 | 1–2 | 0–2 | 2–2 | 2–1 | 1–3 | 0–2 | 2–1 | 2–0 | 1–5 | 1–4 | | 1–3 | 0–1 | 1–1 | 0–1 | 1–3 | 0–0 | 3–1 | 0–1 | 2–1 |
| Nuneaton Borough | 2–0 | 1–0 | 0–0 | 1–1 | 2–2 | 2–3 | 2–2 | 1–2 | 4–0 | 2–1 | 1–0 | 1–1 | 1–0 | | 1–0 | 2–1 | 0–2 | 2–1 | 1–0 | 2–0 | 1–1 | 3–0 |
| Redditch United | 0–1 | 1–1 | 0–5 | 1–0 | 3–1 | 3–1 | 1–0 | 1–3 | 3–2 | 0–1 | 3–1 | 0–2 | 1–1 | 0–0 | | 0–1 | 1–1 | 0–2 | 3–1 | 2–0 | 3–0 | 2–0 |
| Solihull Moors | 2–0 | 0–3 | 1–1 | 0–1 | 1–3 | 1–3 | 3–1 | 3–1 | 0–2 | 2–2 | 1–4 | 1–3 | 1–0 | 3–1 | 0–0 | | 4–1 | 0–4 | 1–0 | 1–1 | 2–3 | 2–2 |
| Southport | 1–1 | 1–0 | 1–1 | 2–1 | 2–2 | 1–0 | 3–0 | 0–0 | 4–0 | 5–0 | 2–1 | 0–1 | 2–0 | 2–2 | 1–1 | 3–2 | | 2–3 | 2–2 | 3–2 | 0–1 | 1–1 |
| Stalybridge Celtic | 1–2 | 3–1 | 2–2 | 0–0 | 3–0 | 2–4 | 5–1 | 3–2 | 2–1 | 0–3 | 3–1 | 0–1 | 3–1 | 0–2 | 6–0 | 4–0 | 2–2 | | 0–0 | 4–1 | 1–0 | 3–0 |
| Tamworth | 0–0 | 0–1 | 0–0 | 3–0 | 1–1 | 4–2 | 2–2 | 1–1 | 3–0 | 4–0 | 2–1 | 1–2 | 2–0 | 1–2 | 1–0 | 0–2 | 1–3 | 2–0 | | 1–1 | 0–2 | 2–0 |
| Vauxhall Motors | 1–3 | 3–2 | 0–2 | 2–2 | 1–0 | 2–0 | 0–3 | 0–1 | 0–1 | 0–3 | 3–4 | 0–6 | 2–2 | 0–0 | 2–0 | 3–2 | 1–2 | 2–5 | 1–3 | | 1–1 | 2–5 |
| Worcester City | 0–3 | 1–1 | 1–1 | 2–2 | 2–1 | 2–1 | 0–1 | 1–1 | 2–1 | 0–1 | 0–2 | 2–3 | 3–1 | 0–4 | 1–0 | 0–0 | 2–1 | 2–1 | 3–3 | 1–0 | | 2–2 |
| Workington | 0–1 | 1–2 | 0–1 | 2–0 | 0–1 | 0–1 | 1–2 | 0–1 | 1–1 | 1–3 | 2–0 | 1–1 | 2–1 | 2–0 | 1–1 | 1–1 | 2–3 | 1–0 | 5–0 | 1–0 | 1–0 | |

Updated to match(es) played on unknown. Source: Sky Sports Football Yearbook 2008–2009. Glenda Rollin & Jack Rollin (eds.). Headline, 2008.
Legend: Blue = home team win; Yellow = draw; Red = away team win.

=== Play-offs ===
Semifinals
2nd | AFC Telford United | 0 | 0 | 0
5th | Barrow | 2 | 2 | 4
3rd | Stalybridge Celtic (pen.) | 0 | 2 | 2 (5)
4th | Southport | 1 | 1 | 2 (3)

Final in Burton
3rd | Stalybridge Celtic | 0
5th | Barrow | 1

==== Semifinals ====
30 April 2008
1st Leg

| Barrow | 2–0 | AFC Telford United |
|---|---|---|
| Tait 72'; Rogan 82' |

Holker Street, Barrow
Attendance: 2,701
4 May 2008
15:00 BST
2nd Leg

| AFC Telford United | 0–2 | Barrow |
|---|---|---|
| | | Reynolds 33' (o.g.); Tait 78' |

New Bucks Head, Telford
Attendance: 4,123

Barrow won 4–0 on Aggregate.

30 April 2008
1st Leg

| Southport | 1–0 | Stalybridge Celtic |
|---|---|---|
| Blakeman 36' | Report |

Haig Avenue, Southport
Attendance: 1,361
4 May 2008
2nd Leg

| Stalybridge Celtic | 2–1 | Southport |
|---|---|---|
| Winn 31'; Payne 70' | Report | Skyes 87' (o.g.) |
Penalties
| Torpey (penalty scored); Barwick (penalty scored); Payne (penalty scored); Meechan (penalty scored); Winn (penalty scored) | 5–3 | (penalty scored) Barratt; (penalty scored) Robinson; (penalty scored) Gray; (penalty missed) Blakeman |

Bower Fold, Stalybridge
Attendance: 1,735
Referee: John Simpson

Stalybridge Celtic won 5–3 on penalties after tying 2–2 on Aggregate.

==== Play-Off Final ====
9 May 2008

| Stalybridge Celtic | 0–1 | Barrow |
|---|---|---|
| | Report | Henney 58' |

Pirelli Stadium, Burton
Attendance: 2,530

== Conference South ==
Conference South
- Season: 2007–08
- Champions: Lewes (1st Football Conference South title)
- Direct promotion: Lewes
- Promoted through play-offs: Eastbourne Borough
- Relegated to Level 7: Cambridge City, Sutton United
- Promoted for the next season: Chelmsford City, Team Bath, AFC Wimbledon, Worcester City
- Matches: 462
- Goals: 1,339 (2.9 per match)
- Biggest home win: Bromley – Thurrock 8–1 (26 December 2007)
- Biggest away win: Bognor Regis – Lewes 0–5 (27 August 2007); Maidenhead –Eastleigh 0–5 (8 March 2008); St Albans City – Thurrock 0–5 (19 September 2007); Thurrock – Hampton & Richmond 0–5 (7 September 2007)
- Highest scoring: Bromley – Thurrock 8–1 (26 December 2007)
- Longest winning run: ?
- Longest unbeaten run: ?
- Longest losing run: ?
- Highest attendance: ?
- Lowest attendance: ?
- Average attendance: ?

=== Promotion and relegation ===
A total of 22 teams contested the division, including 17 sides from last season, one relegated from the Conference National, two promoted from the Isthmian League and two promoted from the Southern Football League.

Teams promoted from 2006–07 Southern League Premier Division

- Bath City
- Maidenhead United

Teams promoted from 2006–07 Isthmian League Premier Division

- Hampton & Richmond Borough
- Bromley

Teams relegated from 2006–07 Conference National

- St Albans City

=== League table ===
| Pos | Team | Pld | W | D | L | GF | GA | GD | Pts | Promotion or relegation |
|---|---|---|---|---|---|---|---|---|---|---|
| 1 | Lewes (C, P) | 42 | 27 | 8 | 7 | 81 | 39 | +42 | 89 | Promotion to Conference Premier |
| 2 | Eastbourne Borough (O, P) | 42 | 23 | 11 | 8 | 83 | 38 | +45 | 80 | Qualification for the Conference South play-offs |
| 3 | Hampton & Richmond Borough | 42 | 21 | 14 | 7 | 87 | 49 | +38 | 77 | Qualification for the Conference South play-offs |
| 4 | Fisher Athletic | 42 | 22 | 5 | 15 | 65 | 61 | +4 | 71 | Qualification for the Conference South play-offs |
| 5 | Braintree Town | 42 | 19 | 12 | 11 | 52 | 42 | +10 | 69 | Qualification for the Conference South play-offs |
| 6 | Eastleigh | 42 | 19 | 10 | 13 | 76 | 62 | +14 | 67 | |
| 7 | Havant & Waterlooville | 42 | 19 | 10 | 13 | 59 | 53 | +6 | 67 | |
| 8 | Bath City | 42 | 17 | 15 | 10 | 59 | 36 | +23 | 66 | |
| 9 | Newport County | 42 | 18 | 12 | 12 | 64 | 49 | +15 | 66 | |
| 10 | Bishop's Stortford | 42 | 18 | 10 | 14 | 72 | 60 | +12 | 64 | |
| 11 | Bromley | 42 | 19 | 7 | 16 | 77 | 66 | +11 | 64 | |
| 12 | Thurrock | 42 | 18 | 9 | 15 | 63 | 64 | −1 | 63 | |
| 13 | Hayes & Yeading United | 42 | 14 | 12 | 16 | 67 | 73 | −6 | 54 | |
| 14 | Cambridge City (R) | 42 | 14 | 10 | 18 | 71 | 72 | −1 | 52 | Demoted to the Southern League Premier Division (Note: Cambridge City were demoted for failing to comply to stadium regulations.) |
| 15 | Basingstoke Town | 42 | 12 | 14 | 16 | 54 | 75 | −21 | 50 | |
| 16 | Welling United | 42 | 13 | 7 | 22 | 41 | 64 | −23 | 46 | |
| 17 | Maidenhead United | 42 | 11 | 12 | 19 | 56 | 59 | −3 | 45 | |
| 18 | Bognor Regis Town | 42 | 11 | 11 | 20 | 49 | 67 | −18 | 44 | |
| 19 | St Albans City | 42 | 10 | 12 | 20 | 43 | 69 | −26 | 42 | |
| 20 | Weston-super-Mare | 42 | 9 | 10 | 23 | 52 | 85 | −33 | 37 | Reprieved from relegation (Note: Weston-super-Mare and Dorchester Town were reprieved from relegation due to the demotion of Cambridge City and the folding of Halifax Town in the Conference Premier.) |
| 21 | Dorchester Town | 42 | 8 | 10 | 24 | 36 | 70 | −34 | 34 | Reprieved from relegation |
| 22 | Sutton United (R) | 42 | 5 | 9 | 28 | 32 | 86 | −54 | 24 | Relegation to the Isthmian League Premier Division |

(C) Champions; (O) Play-off winners; (P) Promoted; (R) Relegated

=== Locations ===
Locations of the Football Conference South 2007–2008 teams
Locations of the Football Conference South London teams 2007–2008

=== Results ===
| Home \ Away | BAS | BAT | BST | BOG | BRA | BRO | CAM | DOR | EAB | EAS | FIS | H&R | H&W | H&Y | LEW | MDH | NPC | SAC | SUT | THU | WEL | WSM |
|---|---|---|---|---|---|---|---|---|---|---|---|---|---|---|---|---|---|---|---|---|---|---|
| Basingstoke Town | | 0–4 | 1–2 | 3–2 | 2–2 | 1–1 | 2–1 | 1–0 | 2–3 | 3–4 | 1–5 | 1–2 | 2–3 | 1–1 | 1–1 | 0–0 | 3–1 | 3–1 | 1–0 | 3–0 | 2–1 | 0–0 |
| Bath City | 0–1 | | 4–0 | 0–0 | 0–0 | 1–1 | 2–0 | 1–0 | 0–0 | 2–0 | 0–1 | 2–0 | 1–1 | 2–2 | 1–1 | 2–0 | 1–1 | 3–0 | 2–3 | 3–1 | 2–0 | 1–0 |
| Bishop's Stortford | 0–0 | 1–1 | | 5–3 | 3–4 | 2–0 | 4–0 | 0–0 | 2–1 | 2–2 | 1–2 | 6–2 | 4–1 | 0–1 | 1–5 | 2–1 | 0–0 | 3–4 | 3–1 | 1–0 | 1–2 | 2–2 |
| Bognor Regis Town | 1–1 | 1–3 | 0–2 | | 2–1 | 1–2 | 2–0 | 0–0 | 0–2 | 0–3 | 0–1 | 2–4 | 1–1 | 3–0 | 0–5 | 1–2 | 0–2 | 1–0 | 1–1 | 3–1 | 0–0 | 2–0 |
| Braintree Town | 2–1 | 2–0 | 2–1 | 3–2 | | 2–1 | 0–1 | 1–0 | 1–0 | 0–2 | 2–3 | 3–0 | 1–0 | 0–1 | 3–0 | 1–1 | 0–0 | 0–0 | 1–0 | 0–0 | 2–1 | 4–0 |
| Bromley | 3–2 | 1–1 | 3–1 | 2–1 | 4–0 | | 3–1 | 0–1 | 1–3 | 1–2 | 1–2 | 0–2 | 2–1 | 2–1 | 1–2 | 1–1 | 2–2 | 3–4 | 1–0 | 8–1 | 2–0 | 3–1 |
| Cambridge City | 3–0 | 2–2 | 2–4 | 2–2 | 0–0 | 1–2 | | 2–2 | 1–1 | 1–1 | 3–2 | 1–2 | 2–0 | 1–4 | 1–3 | 3–0 | 0–2 | 4–0 | 4–1 | 2–2 | 3–1 | 5–1 |
| Dorchester Town | 1–0 | 1–1 | 0–4 | 1–1 | 0–1 | 2–3 | 3–2 | | 0–4 | 0–1 | 2–1 | 0–1 | 0–1 | 1–0 | 1–3 | 2–1 | 2–3 | 0–3 | 0–0 | 0–1 | 0–0 | 1–2 |
| Eastbourne Borough | 6–0 | 0–0 | 1–1 | 3–0 | 2–0 | 1–2 | 0–1 | 4–1 | | 3–2 | 4–0 | 0–0 | 2–2 | 3–1 | 0–2 | 2–1 | 0–0 | 4–0 | 3–0 | 1–0 | 1–0 | 2–2 |
| Eastleigh | 1–1 | 4–4 | 0–0 | 1–0 | 2–1 | 1–4 | 1–0 | 3–1 | 1–2 | | 3–0 | 1–1 | 1–1 | 1–4 | 3–0 | 3–2 | 0–2 | 1–1 | 1–2 | 0–0 | 3–1 | 3–2 |
| Fisher Athletic | 4–1 | 2–1 | 0–1 | 3–1 | 2–0 | 0–3 | 1–1 | 1–1 | 0–4 | 1–4 | | 0–3 | 4–2 | 4–2 | 0–3 | 0–1 | 1–3 | 0–0 | 4–2 | 2–0 | 3–2 | 3–1 |
| Hampton & Richmond | 2–2 | 0–0 | 1–1 | 1–1 | 3–0 | 3–2 | 2–2 | 4–0 | 0–2 | 3–1 | 0–2 | | 1–1 | 4–1 | 6–0 | 1–1 | 1–0 | 4–1 | 2–2 | 2–3 | 4–0 | 5–1 |
| Havant & Waterlooville | 1–1 | 1–0 | 1–2 | 2–0 | 0–0 | 1–0 | 2–1 | 4–0 | 2–1 | 1–0 | 1–0 | 0–3 | | 4–1 | 1–2 | 0–3 | 2–0 | 3–1 | 2–0 | 3–0 | 1–0 | 1–1 |
| Hayes & Yeading United | 1–1 | 3–0 | 2–2 | 0–2 | 3–3 | 6–1 | 3–1 | 2–2 | 1–1 | 2–4 | 2–1 | 0–0 | 3–1 | | 2–1 | 1–4 | 1–3 | 2–1 | 3–3 | 1–1 | 0–1 | 2–2 |
| Lewes | 4–0 | 1–0 | 1–0 | 0–1 | 0–0 | 2–2 | 3–1 | 2–0 | 2–2 | 3–2 | 1–0 | 1–2 | 4–0 | 2–1 | | 0–0 | 1–0 | 0–2 | 4–0 | 1–0 | 2–0 | 3–0 |
| Maidenhead United | 1–2 | 0–1 | 5–0 | 1–2 | 0–1 | 2–3 | 1–1 | 3–1 | 1–2 | 0–5 | 2–3 | 1–2 | 3–3 | 0–1 | 0–0 | | 2–3 | 0–0 | 1–1 | 1–2 | 0–1 | 0–0 |
| Newport County | 2–0 | 2–3 | 1–0 | 2–2 | 2–0 | 3–1 | 4–1 | 3–2 | 1–1 | 1–2 | 1–2 | 2–2 | 0–1 | 1–1 | 1–3 | 1–1 | | 2–0 | 2–0 | 1–4 | 0–1 | 5–0 |
| St Albans City | 4–1 | 1–2 | 1–2 | 1–1 | 1–1 | 1–0 | 0–2 | 0–3 | 2–3 | 3–2 | 0–1 | 1–1 | 1–0 | 2–0 | 1–1 | 0–3 | 0–0 | | 1–2 | 0–5 | 1–2 | 0–3 |
| Sutton United | 1–2 | 0–4 | 0–1 | 0–2 | 0–3 | 2–2 | 0–3 | 1–3 | 1–5 | 0–0 | 0–2 | 2–1 | 1–3 | 1–2 | 0–3 | 2–3 | 0–1 | 0–0 | | 1–0 | 1–2 | 0–3 |
| Thurrock | 1–1 | 1–0 | 1–0 | 1–0 | 1–1 | 2–1 | 5–2 | 3–1 | 3–2 | 4–1 | 0–0 | 0–5 | 0–2 | 2–0 | 2–3 | 2–3 | 3–0 | 1–1 | 2–1 | | 2–0 | 3–2 |
| Welling United | 0–1 | 1–0 | 2–1 | 2–3 | 0–2 | 3–1 | 2–6 | 1–1 | 1–0 | 3–1 | 0–1 | 1–3 | 1–1 | 1–2 | 0–4 | 0–2 | 1–2 | 0–0 | 0–0 | 2–2 | | 2–1 |
| Weston-super-Mare | 3–3 | 0–2 | 0–4 | 3–2 | 1–2 | 0–1 | 0–1 | 1–0 | 1–2 | 0–3 | 1–1 | 2–2 | 3–1 | 3–1 | 1–2 | 1–2 | 2–2 | 0–3 | 3–0 | 3–1 | 0–3 | |

Updated to match(es) played on unknown. Source: Sky Sports Football Yearbook 2008–2009. Glenda Rollin & Jack Rollin (eds.). Headline, 2008.
Legend: Blue = home team win; Yellow = draw; Red = away team win.

=== Play-offs ===
Semifinals
2nd | Eastbourne Borough | 2 | 3 | 5
5th | Braintree Town | 0 | 0 | 0
3rd | Hampton & Richmond B. (pen.) | 1 | 0 | 1 (4)
4th | Fisher Athletic | 1 | 0 | 1 (2)

Final in Stevenage
2nd | Eastbourne Borough | 2
3rd | Hampton & Richmond Borough | 0

==== Semifinals ====
29 April 2008
1st Leg

| Braintree Town | 0–2 | Eastbourne Borough |
|---|---|---|
| | | Tait 31', 68' |

Cressing Road, Braintree
Attendance: 1,017
3 May 2008
2nd Leg

| Eastbourne Borough | 3–0 | Braintree Town |
|---|---|---|
| Tait 43'; Crabb 86'; Atkin 90' |

Priory Lane, Eastbourne
Attendance: 1,802

29 April 2008
1st Leg

| Fisher Athletic | 1–1 | Hampton & Richmond Borough |
|---|---|---|
| Tomlin 59' | | Hodges 34' |

Champion Hill, Dulwich
Attendance: 450
3 May 2008
2nd Leg

| Hampton & Richmond Borough | 0–0 | Fisher Athletic |
|---|---|---|
| | Report |
Penalties
| Yaku (penalty scored); McAuley (penalty scored); Lovett (penalty scored); Harris (penalty scored) | 4–2 | (penalty scored) McCollin; (penalty missed) Hickie; (penalty scored) Thomas; (penalty missed) Batts |

The Rocket Hospitality Beveree Stadium, Hampton
Attendance: 1,489

Hampton and Richmond Borough won 4–2 on penalties after tying 1–1 on Aggregate.

==== Play-Off Final ====
8 May 2008
19:45 GMT

| Eastbourne Borough | 2–0 | Hampton & Richmond Borough |
|---|---|---|
| Crabb 85'; Armstrong 90' | Report |

Broadhall Way, Stevenage
Attendance: 1,077
