= Ron Hewitt =

Ron Hewitt may refer to:

- Ron Hewitt (footballer, born 1928) (1928–2001), Wales international football player
- Ron Hewitt (footballer, born 1924) (1924–2011), English footballer
