= James Lomas =

James or Jamie Lomas may refer to:

- James Lomas (actor) (born 1990), English stage actor
- James Lomas (rugby league) (1879–1960), English rugby league footballer
- Jamie Lomas (born 1975), English actor
- Jamie Lomas (footballer) (born 1977), English footballer
