= Daniel Barrett =

Dan, Danny or Daniel Barrett may refer to:

== Musicians ==
- Dan Barrett (born 1980), American musician, founding member of rock duo Have a Nice Life
- Dan Barrett (jazz musician) (born 1955), American jazz trombonist

== Sportsmen ==
- Danny Barrett (American football) (born 1961), quarterback and coach
- Daniel Barrett (footballer) (born 1980), English footballer for Chesterfield
- Dan Barrett (soccer coach), Australian soccer coach since 2014
- Danny Barrett (rugby union) (born 1990), American rugby player

== Others ==
- Dan Barrett (politician), American attorney, judicial candidate from North Carolina
- Daniel J. Barrett (born 1963), American writer and software engineer
- Daniel Barrett (visual effects supervisor), American film technician, Academy Award winner for 2022's Avatar: The Way of Water
