= Jim Brown (footballer, born 1952) =

Scottish footballer

Personal information
- Full name: James Grady Brown
- Date of birth: 11 May 1952 (age 74)
- Place of birth: Coatbridge, Scotland
- Height: 5 ft 11 in (1.80 m)
- Position: Goalkeeper

Senior career*
Years	Team	Apps	(Gls)
1968–1972	Albion Rovers	94	(0)
1972–1973	Chesterfield	47	(0)
1973–1978	Sheffield United	170	(0)
1979–1980	Detroit Express	60	(0)
1979–1981	Detroit Express (indoor)	12	(0)
1981	Washington Diplomats	31	(1)
1981–1982	Chicago Sting (indoor)	4	(0)
1982	Chicago Sting	4	(0)
1982–1983	Cardiff City	3	(0)
1983	Kettering Town	10	(0)
1983–1989	Chesterfield	135	(1)
Total		570	(2)

International career
1974–1975	Scotland under-23	5	(0)
1975	Scotland	1	(0)
- * Club domestic league appearances and goals

James Grady Brown (born 11 May 1952) is a Scottish former professional footballer, who played as a goalkeeper. During his career, he made over 300 appearances in the Football League and spent four years in the North American Soccer League playing for the Detroit Express, Washington Diplomats and Chicago Sting. He also gained one cap for Scotland in 1975.

== Early life ==
As a teenager, Brown attended St. Ambrose High School in Lanarkshire.

== Club career ==
Brown began his career at Albion Rovers, appearing over 100 times for the club after making his debut at the age of 16. In 1972, he played in a pre-season friendly against Chesterfield and impressed the club's management. Several months later, in December 1972, he joined the club, turning down a move to Brighton & Hove Albion. He quickly established himself in the first-team and attracted the attention of First Division side Sheffield United, joining the Blades on the final day of the transfer window in the 1973–74 season. He went on to spend five years at Bramall Lane, winning the club's player of the year award in 1975, before moving to the North American Soccer League with Detroit Express in 1979.

He returned to Britain in 1982, spending a brief time at Cardiff City before joining Kettering Town as cover for the injured Steve Conroy. He made his league debut for the Poppies in 3–2 defeat to Frickley Athletic and made 18 appearances during the 1982–83 season. At the start of the following season, he rejoined Chesterfield as the club began suffering a financial crisis. He competed with Chris Marples for the starting spot for several years before Marples departure to Stockport County in 1987. Several years after officially retiring Brown was named as a substitute on two occasions in his forties, the 1995 Football League Third Division play-off final and the first round of the FA Cup in 1997, at the age of 45.

== International career ==
Having represented Scotland at under-23, Brown was called up for several matches in the British Home Championship as understudy to Stewart Kennedy. When Kennedy suffered an ankle injury during a defeat to England and was unable to recover for the following match against Romania at Stadionul Național in Bucharest during qualifying for UEFA Euro 1976, handing Brown his first cap. The match, played in front of 80,000 fans, ended in a 1–1 draw.

== Later life ==
Since 1986, he has been the commercial manager at Chesterfield. During his time in the role, Brown, along with three other members of staff, began keeping records of the club's financial activity under chairman Darren Brown after becoming concerned about his business practices. He later testified in front of a Football League panel against the then chairman and the records were eventually used to help convict Darren Brown of fraud in 2005, being sentenced to four years in prison.

Brown later stated "we knew the proper way to run the club. In the very first week, Darren Brown was paying money out with no invoices, so we began to keep a log.[...] We had to stand up in front of Darren Brown and tell the truth, which we did to get Brown out and save the club". He also helped the club in a number of other capacities, including running the club lottery and writing the match programmes.

== Honours ==
Chesterfield

- Football League Third Division play-offs: 1995
