= Tony Lormor =

English footballer (born 1970)

Personal information
- Full name: Anthony Lormor
- Date of birth: 29 October 1970 (age 56)
- Place of birth: Ashington, England
- Position: Forward

Youth career
- Wallsend Boys Club
- Newcastle United

Senior career*
| Years | Team | Apps | (Gls) |
| 1987–1990 | Newcastle United | 8 | (3) |
| 1988–1989 | → Norwich City (loan) | 0 | (0) |
| 1990–1994 | Lincoln City | 100 | (30) |
| 1994 | → Halifax Town (loan) | 7 | (1) |
| 1994 | Peterborough United | 5 | (0) |
| 1994–1997 | Chesterfield | 113 | (35) |
| 1997–1998 | Preston North End | 12 | (3) |
| 1998 | → Notts County (loan) | 7 | (0) |
| 1998–2000 | Mansfield Town | 74 | (20) |
| 2000–2002 | Hartlepool United | 48 | (9) |
| 2002 | → Shrewsbury Town (loan) | 7 | (2) |
| 2002–2003 | Telford United | 4 | (0) |
| 2003–2005 | Sutton Town | | |
| 2005–2006 | Heanor Town | | |
- * Club domestic league appearances and goals

Anthony Lormor (born 29 October 1970), also known as Anth Lormor, is an English former professional footballer who scored 102 goals from 374 appearances in the Football League. He played as a forward for Newcastle United, Lincoln City, Peterborough United, Chesterfield, Preston North End, Notts County, Mansfield Town, Hartlepool United and Shrewsbury Town.

== Football career ==
Lormor was born in Ashington, Northumberland. A product of Wallsend Boys Club, he joined Newcastle United as a youth trainee. His first-team debut came on 23 January 1988, as substitute for Mirandinha in a 2–0 home win against Tottenham Hotspur in the First Division. He played four more times in the 1987–88 season, and scored his first Football League goal on his first start, in a 3–1 defeat of Oxford United. In November 1988, Lormor joined Norwich City on loan as Andy Fensome made a loan move in the opposite direction; neither player appeared for his loan club's first team.

Lormor signed for Lincoln City in January 1990 for a fee of £25,000, and made an immediate impact. He scored the winner on his League debut against Wrexham, finished the season with eight goals, only one fewer than leading scorer Gordon Hobson, and was himself the club's top scorer in 1990–91 and 1991–92. A cruciate injury caused him to miss the whole of the next season, and though he returned to the side after 18 months out, he started only nine more games, and spent a spell on loan at Conference club Halifax Town, before being released.

After a spell at Peterborough United, during which he regained fitness playing regularly in the reserves, Lormor moved to Division Three club Chesterfield in December 1994. In partnership with Phil Robinson, Lormor helped Chesterfield to a run of 21 games unbeaten, which would have been 22 had he not missed a penalty. According to the club's website, "the influence of these two on the side cannot be overstated". Robinson and Lormor scored the goals in the 1995 playoff final against Bury that earned the club promotion to Division Two. Injury disrupted his next season, and after a long period playing either out of position in midfield or not playing at all, he asked for a transfer. Lormor did however contribute to Chesterfield's run to the 1996–97 FA Cup semifinals. He scored in the second round against Scarborough, but did not play in the tournament later than the third round against Bristol City as his teammates went on to beat Bolton Wanderers and Nottingham Forest en route to a semifinal against Middlesbrough at Old Trafford. In November 1997, Lormor joined Preston North End in part-exchange for David Reeves.

Lormor scored the opening goal and added an assist for a second as Preston won 3–1 at Luton Town, but only two more goals came from his next 16 appearances, and he was allowed to join Notts County on loan in February 1998. After failing to score in seven games for County, Lormor left Preston for Mansfield Town in the 1998 close season for a fee of £15,000. A fee had been agreed the previous summer for him to join Mansfield from Chesterfield, but manager John Duncan had been reluctant to allow him to leave without a replacement.

Two seasons with Mansfield produced 20 goals from 74 League games before Lormor moved on to Hartlepool United for a fee of £30,000. Recurrence of a long-standing injury meant he was unable to give of his best at Hartlepool. He spent a month on loan at Shrewsbury Town, but despite both club and player wanting to extend the stay, his parent club were unwilling to let him remain with their promotion rivals. He made no more appearances for Hartlepool, and was released at the end of the 2001–02 season.

After interest from clubs including Scarborough, Kettering Town, Halifax Town, and King's Lynn, Lormor signed for Conference club Telford United for the 2002–03 season. He played only five games before injury again intervened, and in January 2003 he announced his retirement from football because of work commitments. A few weeks later he resumed his football career, with Sutton Town, and scored on his debut. At the end of the season, having helped the club gain promotion to the Northern Counties East League, Lormor signed a two-year playing contract and also agreed to act as commercial manager. He stayed with Sutton Town until December 2005, when he joined Heanor Town as a player, but returned to Sutton at the end of the season as a coach.

Lormor was commercial manager of former club Mansfield Town between July 2007 and July 2008.

== Honours ==
Chesterfield

- Football League Third Division play-offs: 1995
