= Ron Hewitt (footballer, born 1924) =

English footballer

Personal information
- Full name: Ronald Hewitt
- Date of birth: 21 January 1924
- Place of birth: Barrow Hill, England
- Date of death: June 2011 (aged 87)
- Place of death: Chesterfield, England
- Position: Goalkeeper

Senior career*
Years	Team	Apps	(Gls)
- Youlgreave
	Sheffield United	0	(0)
1948–1949	Lincoln City	3	(0)
–1952	Worksop Town		
1952–1957	Grantham	186	(0)
1957–????	Spalding United		
- * Club domestic league appearances and goals

Ronald Hewitt (21 January 1924 – June 2011) was an English professional footballer who played as a goalkeeper in the Football League for Sheffield United and Lincoln City and in non-League football for Worksop Town, Grantham and Spalding United.

== Career ==
Born in Barrow Hill, Derbyshire, Hewitt started his career at local side Youlgreave before signing for Football League First Division side Sheffield United. He later signed for Football League Second Division side Lincoln City, making his debut in October 1948 against Fulham. He went on to make three appearances for the club before dropping back into non-league football with Worksop Town. He signed for Midland Football League side Grantham in 1952 and started the first match of the 1952–53 season in goal against Mansfield Town Reserves. In his first two seasons for the club he played in two Lincolnshire Senior Cup 'A' Finals, firstly in the defeat against Spalding United, and then the 3–0 victory over Gainsborough Trinity. He remained a regular up until the start of the 1956–57 season playing virtually every match, but during his final season for the club he was kept out of the side in many games by David Brown. His final appearance for Grantham came in the last league game of the season against Lincoln City Reserves. In total he made 205 appearances for the club. After leaving Grantham he went on to sign for Eastern Counties Football League side Spalding United.

== Personal life ==
During World War II he served as a Bevin Boy, and worked at Staveley Works as a crane driver until his retirement. His nephew Jamie Hewitt, played professionally for Chesterfield and Doncaster Rovers between 1986 and 2002, before retiring to become a physiotherapist. Hewitt died in June 2011 in Chesterfield, Derbyshire at the age of 87.
