= Ashley Winn =

English association football player (born 1985)

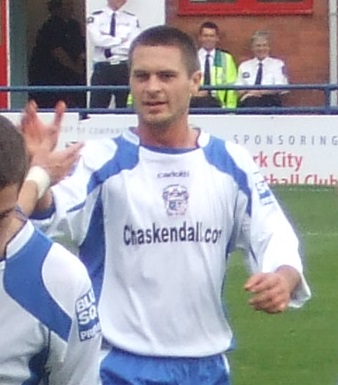
- Winn playing for Barrow in 2008

Personal information
- Full name: Ashley Winn
- Date of birth: 1 December 1985 (age 40)
- Place of birth: Stockton-on-Tees, England
- Height: 5 ft 11 in (1.80 m)
- Position: Midfielder

Team information
- Current team: Farnborough

Youth career
- Middlesbrough
- ?–2004: Oldham Athletic

Senior career*
Years	Team	Apps	(Gls)
2004–2005	Oldham Athletic	2	(0)
2005–2006	York City	0	(0)
2006	→ Stalybridge Celtic (loan)	9	(0)
2006–2008	Stalybridge Celtic	63	(11)
2008–2009	Barrow	15	(0)
2008–2009	→ Southport (loan)	3	(2)
2009–2011	Southport	64	(1)
2010–2011	→ Gateshead (loan)	3	(0)
2011	Gateshead	10	(2)
2011–	Farnborough	33	(0)
- * Club domestic league appearances and goals as of 23:45, 10 July 2011 (UTC)

Ashley Winn (born 1 December 1985) is an English semi-professional footballer who plays for Farnborough as a midfielder.

== Career ==
Born in Stockton-on-Tees, County Durham, Winn started his career after signing for Middlesbrough at the age of eight, before joining Oldham Athletic as a schoolboy. He made his first team debut as an 83rd minute substitute in a 1–0 defeat at Swindon Town on 16 October 2004. His second and final appearance of the 2004–05 season came as an 88th-minute substitute in a 2–1 defeat to AFC Bournemouth. He was released by Oldham and signed for Conference National team York City on 29 July 2005 following a trial. He suffered a hamstring injury in August and a shoulder injury in September.

He joined Conference North team Stalybridge Celtic on loan on 17 March 2006 and played in nine games during the 2005–06 season. He was released by York in May after failing to feature in the first team. He signed for Stalybridge permanently on 7 July and he finished the 2006–07 season with 40 appearances and five goals. He decided to leave the club at the end of the season, but in August eventually signed a new contract. He played for Stalybridge in the 2008 Conference North play-off Final, which the team lost 1–0 to Barrow, and he finished the season with 2007–08 with 35 appearances and eight goals.

He joined newly promoted Conference National side Barrow in July 2008. After failing to secure a regular place, however, he joined Southport on a month's loan on 5 December, with a view to a permanent transfer. He made his debut a day later in a 1–0 defeat at AFC Telford United and his first goals came after scoring twice in a 5–2 victory over Gainsborough Trinity on 20 December. A permanent move to Southport took place on 21 January 2009 after he was signed for a fee of £2,500. He played for Southport in their 2–1 defeat on aggregate to Gateshead in the Conference North play-off semi-final and he finished the 2008–09 season with 29 appearances and three goals for Southport. He made 34 appearances and scored one goal for Southport as they won the Conference North title in the 2009–10 season, having been converted successfully from his regular central position into a right sided winger by manager Liam Watson.

Winn signed for Gateshead on 1 November 2010, initially on loan with a fee of £2,500 agreed for a permanent transfer in January 2011. Winn made his debut on 6 November 2010 as a substitute in the FA Cup against Notts County. He scored his first goal for the club on 5 March 2011 in a 1–1 draw with Altrincham at Moss Lane. Winn was made available for transfer by Gateshead on 4 May 2011, and after a successful trial, signed for Farnborough on 10 July 2011 on a free transfer.

== Career statistics ==
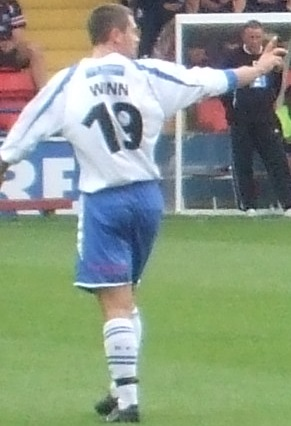
Winn playing for Barrow in 2008

As of 10 July 2011

Club	Season	League^{[A]}		FA Cup		League Cup		Other^{[B]}		Total	
Club	Season	Apps	Goals	Apps	Goals	Apps	Goals	Apps	Goals	Apps	Goals
Oldham Athletic	2004–05	2	0	0	0	0	0	0	0	2	0
York City	2005–06	0	0	0	0	0	0	0	0	0	0
Stalybridge Celtic	2005–06	9	0	0	0	0	0	0	0	9	0
Stalybridge Celtic	2006–07	35	4	0	0	0	0	5	1	40	5
Stalybridge Celtic	2007–08	28	7	2	0	0	0	5	1	35	8
Stalybridge Celtic	Total	72	11	2	0	0	0	10	2	84	13
Barrow	2008–09	15	0	3	0	0	0	1	0	19	0
Southport	2008–09	21	2	0	0	0	0	8	1	29	3
Southport	2009–10	32	1	1	0	0	0	1	0	34	1
Southport	2010–11	14	0	0	0	0	0	0	0	14	0
Southport	Total	67	3	1	0	0	0	9	1	77	4
Gateshead	2010–11	13	2	1	0	0	0	1	0	15	2
Farnborough	2011–12	0	0	0	0	0	0	0	0	0	0
Career total		169	16	7	0	0	0	21	3	197	19

A. The "League" column constitutes appearances and goals (including those as a substitute) in the Football League and Football Conference.
B. The "Other" column constitutes appearances and goals (including those as a substitute) in the Conference League Cup, FA Trophy and play-offs.
