= Lee Rogers (footballer, born 1966) =

English footballer

Personal information
- Full name: Lee Julian Rogers
- Date of birth: 21 October 1966 (age 60)
- Place of birth: Doncaster, West Riding of Yorkshire, England
- Height: 5 ft 10 in (1.78 m)
- Position: Defender

Youth career
- –1984: Doncaster Rovers

Senior career*
Years	Team	Apps	(Gls)
1984–1986	Doncaster Rovers	0	(0)
1986–1998	Chesterfield	334	(1)
- Gainsborough Trinity
Total		334	(1)
- * Club domestic league appearances and goals

Lee Julian Rogers (born 21 October 1966) is an English former professional footballer who played as a defender in the Football League for Chesterfield, in non-League football for Gainsborough Trinity, and was on the books of Doncaster Rovers without making a league appearance.

== Honours ==
Chesterfield

- Football League Third Division play-offs: 1995
