= Mike Walsh (footballer) =

Republic of Ireland international footballer

Personal information
- Full name: Michael Thomas Walsh
- Date of birth: 20 June 1956 (age 70)
- Place of birth: Blackley, England
- Height: 6 ft 0 in (1.83 m)
- Position: Defender

Senior career*
Years	Team	Apps	(Gls)
1974–1981	Bolton Wanderers	177	(4)
1981–1983	Everton	20	(0)
1982	→ Norwich City (loan)	5	(0)
1982–1983	→ Burnley (loan)	3	(0)
1983	Fort Lauderdale Strikers	11	(0)
1983–1984	Manchester City	4	(0)
1984–1989	Blackpool	153	(6)
Total		373	(10)

International career
1982	Republic of Ireland	4	(0)

Managerial career
- 1990–1995: Bury
- 1996: Barrow
- 2003: Southport
- * Club domestic league appearances and goals

Michael Thomas Walsh (born 20 June 1956) is an Irish former professional footballer who played for many clubs. A defender, he was probably best known as a captain of Bolton Wanderers and also for gaining honours representing the Republic of Ireland national football team.

== Playing career ==
Born and raised in Manchester, Walsh was snapped up as a 17-year-old by Bolton Wanderers. He made his debut as an 18-year-old and quickly established a reputation as a no-nonsense defender. This was rewarded by his manager Ian Greaves who made him captain.

Walsh stayed with Bolton from 1974 to 1981. During this time he made 177 league appearances and scored four goals. In 1978 led the club to the First Division as champions of the Second Division after narrowly missing promotion the season before.

In 1981, Walsh was snapped up by Howard Kendall at Everton for £90,000 plus Jim McDonagh. Walsh was one of Kendall's "Magnificent Seven" signings. He later had loan spells at Norwich City and Burnley.

In 1983, he was offered the opportunity to play in Florida for George Best's old team Fort Lauderdale Strikers. The club folded the following season and Walsh returned to England. He signed for Manchester City but within four months he joined Blackpool, where he went on to give a further 144 league appearances.

== International career ==
Though born in Manchester, Walsh qualified to play for the Republic of Ireland national football team through his Irish ancestry. He made his international debut on 21 May 1982 in a 1–0 defeat to Chile in Santiago and went on to play three more times for Ireland.

== Post-playing career ==
Walsh followed his Blackpool manager Sam Ellis to Bury as the first team coach. Upon Ellis' departure to Maine Road to join Peter Reid as his assistant at Manchester City, Walsh took up the reins as manager in September 1990.

His time as manager lasted five years, during which he took the club to the play-offs three times, including the club's first appearance at Wembley. All this was during a time when the club had a massive financial burden and many players had to be sold to keep the club afloat. Just five games after losing in the Wembley play-off final, Walsh was sacked as the chairman became impatient despite the club having no finances to improve the team.

After a brief spell of taking Barrow to the top of their division, Walsh's old Everton teammate Steve McMahon asked Walsh to join him at Swindon Town as his assistant in 1997. Walsh also stayed on to assist Jimmy Quinn after McMahon's resignation late in 1998.

After being made redundant by Swindon Town, he became Peter Reid's Chief Scout at Sunderland. In 2003, he had a brief spell as manager of Southport, where, despite being in the top half of the table upon his arrival, they suffered relegation out of the Conference, only slipping into the relegation places on the last day of the season after a defeat away at Stevenage Borough. After a successful start to the season, Southport went on a long winless streak which saw them fall from top spot to the brink of not qualifying for the newly formed Conference North league, this was something deemed unthinkable for the Southport board who left with no decision but to sack Walsh and replace him with Liam Watson in an attempt to secure qualification. In 2004, Walsh was then asked back to Swindon Town as Andy King's assistant, but and decided to retire from the game a year later, and is now running a restaurant in Javea, Spain.

== Honours ==
Bolton Wanderers

- Second Division champions: 1977–78

Blackpool

- Fourth Division runners-up: 1984–85
