= Greg Pearce (footballer) =

English footballer

Personal information
- Place of birth: Bolton, England
- Position: Defender

Senior career*
Years	Team	Apps	(Gls)
1996–2002	Chesterfield	49	(0)
- * Club domestic league appearances and goals

Greg Pearce is a footballer who played in The Football League for Chesterfield. He made 49 league appearances for Chesterfield but fell out of favour with then manager Nicky Law.
