= Mick Leonard (English footballer) =

English footballer (born 1959)

Personal information
- Full name: Michael Christopher Leonard
- Date of birth: 9 May 1959 (age 67)
- Place of birth: Carshalton, England
- Height: 5 ft 11 in (1.80 m)
- Position: Goalkeeper

Senior career*
Years	Team	Apps	(Gls)
1975–1976	Epsom & Ewell		
1976–1979	Halifax Town	69	(0)
1979–1989	Notts County	204	(0)
1989–1994	Chesterfield	176	(0)
1990	→ Halifax Town (loan)	3	(0)
1994–1998	Instant-Dict	72	(0)
1998–2000	South China AA	34	(0)
- * Club domestic league appearances and goals

Michael Christopher Leonard (born 9 May 1959) is an English retired football player who played in Hong Kong First Division League. He played the position of goalkeeper and was regarded as the best goalkeeper in Hong Kong at the time. In 1994, he made his debut in Hong Kong First Division League for Instant-Dict. In 1998, he moved to South China.

In 2000, he retired from professional football due to severe injury.
