= Joel Armstrong =

English footballer

Personal information
- Date of birth: 7 September 1982 (age 44)
- Place of birth: Chesterfield, England
- Position: Goalkeeper

Youth career
- 1998–1999: Chesterfield

Senior career*
Years	Team	Apps	(Gls)
1999–2002	Chesterfield	4	(0)
2002	→ Ilkeston (loan)	8	(0)
2002	→ Bradford Park Avenue (loan)		
- Staveley Miners Welfare
- Matlock Town
- Sheffield
- Ossett Town
- * Club domestic league appearances and goals

Joel Armstrong (born 25 September 1981) is a footballer who played in the Football League for Chesterfield.

== Career ==
Armstrong started his career at his local team Chesterfield where he made six appearances. He spent time on loan at Ilkeston and Bradford Park Avenue before being released by Chesterfield in 2002. Since then, he has played for Staveley Miners Welfare, Matlock Town, Sheffield and Ossett Town.

He later entered into business with Richard Lyons.
