= Andrew Mitchell (footballer, born 1879) =

Scottish footballer

Personal information
- Full name: Andrew Mitchell
- Date of birth: 1879
- Place of birth: Scotland
- Date of death: after 1899
- Position: Outside left

Senior career*
Years	Team	Apps	(Gls)
- Albion Rovers
1898–1899	Woolwich Arsenal	10	(2)
- * Club domestic league appearances and goals

Andrew Mitchell (1879 – after 1899) was a Scottish footballer. An outside left, he first played for Albion Rovers before transferring to Woolwich Arsenal in 1898. He made his debut against Luton Town on 3 September 1898 and scored the winning goal in a 1–0 win. He played ten league games in 1898–99, but soon fell out of favour and left the club at the end of that season.
