= Dave Hanson (footballer) =

English footballer

Personal information
- Full name: David Hanson
- Date of birth: 19 November 1968 (age 57)
- Place of birth: Huddersfield, England
- Height: 6 ft 0 in (1.83 m)
- Position: Forward

Senior career*
Years	Team	Apps	(Gls)
1985–1988	Manchester United	0	(0)
1988–1989	Huddersfield Town	0	(0)
1992–1993	Farsley Celtic	16	(6)
1993–1994	Bury	3	(0)
1994–1995	Halifax Town	43	(15)
1995	Hednesford Town	10	(8)
1995–1997	Leyton Orient	50	(11)
1997	→ Welling United (loan)	5	(3)
1997	→ Chesterfield (loan)	3	(1)
1997	→ Dover Athletic (loan)	1	(1)
1997–1999	Halifax Town	32	(8)
1999–2000	Nuneaton Borough	25	(10)
2000–2001	Hyde United	15	(5)
Total		203	(68)
- * Club domestic league appearances and goals as of 17:49, 4 July 2008 (UTC)

David Hanson (born 19 November 1968) is an English former football striker.

Dave Hanson started his career with Manchester United as an apprentice professional in 1985 after leaving Almondbury High School in Huddersfield. He spent four years at United, but was troubled by a back problem and eventually retired from football at the age of 20. Hanson then went on to study PE at Carnegie College in Leeds and graduated in 1994. While at Carnegie, he returned to football with Farsley Celtic. He made his league debut for Bury v Scunthorpe United whilst still at Carnegie in 1993 and played 3 first team games in total. In 1994 Hanson signed for Halifax Town on a free transfer. He racked up 43 league games and 15 goals. He then joined Hednesford Town at the start of the 1996–97 season for a fee of £10,000 scoring 8 goals in 10 games. After only months at Hednesford he transferred to Leyton Orient for £50,000. He rejoined Halifax Town in 1998, racking up 50 league games for Orient, and scoring 11 goals. During his time at Orient he played for three loan clubs: Welling United (5 games, 3 goals) Dover Athletic (1 game, 1 goal) and Chesterfield (3 games, 1 goal). Halifax let Hanson go at the end of the 1998–99 season after making 32 league appearances. He joined Nuneaton Borough in 1999 and made 25 appearances scoring 10 goals. He then joined Hyde United in 2000. Hanson left Hyde in 2001 after playing 15 games and scoring 5 goals.

Hanson retired from football in 2001 and began a full-time career in teaching. He worked as a sports lecturer at Barnsley College for 2 years before moving on to teach at Tong School, Bradford as a PE teacher. Hanson left Tong School in 2006 to study as a physiotherapist at the University of Salford and qualified as a chartered physiotherapist in 2010.

Hanson began a third spell at FC Halifax Town in December 2010 as first-team physio. He worked part-time at Bradford City's Centre of Excellence as well as a supply teacher in the Huddersfield area.

In October 2011 Hanson left FC Halifax Town to take up a full-time position with Bradford City as head physiotherapist.
