= Steven Gaughan =

English footballer

Personal information
- Full name: Steven Edward Gaughan
- Date of birth: 14 April 1970 (age 56)
- Place of birth: Doncaster, England
- Height: 5 ft 11 in (1.80 m)
- Position: Midfielder

Senior career*
Years	Team	Apps	(Gls)
1987–1988	Hatfield Main		
1988–1990	Doncaster Rovers	67	(3)
1990–1992	Sunderland	0	(0)
1992–1996	Darlington	171	(15)
1996–1997	Chesterfield	20	(0)
1997–1999	Darlington	47	(3)
1999–2001	Halifax Town	47	(1)
2000–2001	→ Cork City (loan)	16	(0)
2001–2004	Barrow	113	(23)
2004–2005	Armthorpe Welfare		
2005–2006	Stocksbridge Park Steels		
- * Club domestic league appearances and goals

Steven Edward Gaughan (born 14 April 1970) is an English former footballer who played as a midfielder for various clubs in the Football League. Whilst at Chesterfield he featured in their memorable run to the 1997 FA Cup semi finals, coming on as a substitute in their quarter final victory over Wrexham. However, he did not play in the semi-final itself, as Chesterfield ultimately lost to Middlesbrough after a replay.
