= Gary Patterson (footballer) =

English footballer

Personal information
- Date of birth: 27 November 1972 (age 53)
- Place of birth: Newcastle-upon-Tyne, England
- Position: Midfielder

Senior career*
Years	Team	Apps	(Gls)
1991–1993	Notts County	0	(0)
1993–1994	Shrewsbury Town	57	(2)
1994–1997	Wycombe Wanderers	59	(2)
1996–1997	→ Barnet (loan)	3	(0)
1996–1997	→ Chesterfield (loan)	9	(0)
–	Kingstonian		
- * Club domestic league appearances and goals

Gary Patterson (born 27 November 1972) is a former professional footballer who played in The Football League for Notts County, Shrewsbury Town, Wycombe Wanderers, Barnet and Chesterfield.

== Honours ==
Shrewsbury Town

- Football League Third Division: 1993–94
