= Andrew J. Mitchell =

American philosopher (born 1970)

- Born: 12 July 1970 (age 56)
- Awards: ACLS fellowship, NEH fellowship

Academic background
- Education: Stony Brook University (PhD)
- Thesis: The Fourfold and Technology: Heidegger's Thinking of Limit (2001)

Academic work
- Era: 21st-century philosophy
- Region: Western philosophy
- Institutions: Emory University
- Main interests: German philosophy, especially Fichte, Schelling, Nietzsche, Heidegger

Andrew John Mitchell (born 12 July 1970) is an American philosopher and professor of philosophy at Emory University. He is known for his works on Heidegger's thought.

== Books ==
- Wagner and The Subject of Redemption: Politics, Erotics, and Religion in the Music Dramas, with Kevin Karnes, forthcoming
- The Fourfold: Reading the Late Heidegger, Northwestern University Press 2015
- Heidegger Among the Sculptors: Body, Space, and the Art of Dwelling, Stanford University Press 2010

=== Edited ===
- Heidegger's "Black Notebooks": Responses to Anti-Semitism, eds. Andrew J. Mitchell and Peter Trawny, Columbia University Press 2017
- Heidegger, die Juden, noch einmal, eds. Andrew J. Mitchell and Peter Trawny, Klostermann 2015
- Derrida and Joyce: Texts and Contexts, eds. Andrew J. Mitchell and Sam Slote, SUNY 2013
- The Obsessions of Georges Bataille: Community and Communication, eds. Andrew J. Mitchell and Jason Winfree, SUNY 2009
