= Lee Francis (footballer) =

English football defender

Personal information
- Full name: Lee Charles Francis
- Date of birth: 24 October 1969 (age 57)
- Place of birth: Walthamstow, England
- Position: Defender

Senior career*
Years	Team	Apps	(Gls)
1987–1988	Arsenal	0	(0)
1990	→ Chesterfield (loan)	2	(0)
1990–1992	Chesterfield	68	(2)
1992–1993	Enfield		
1994	Boreham Wood		
1995	Grays Athletic		
1995	Yeovil Town		
1996	Hendon		
1996	Grays Athletic		
1997	Billericay Town		
1998	Hertford Town		
1999	Enfield		
- * Club domestic league appearances and goals

Lee Charles Francis (born 24 October 1969) is an English former footballer who played the Football League for Chesterfield.
