= Paul Alcock =

English football referee (1953–2018)

- Full name: Paul E. Alcock
- Born: 27 October 1953; Redhill, Surrey, England
- Died: 29 January 2018 (aged 64)

Domestic
Years	League	Role
1982–1988	Football League	Asst. referee
1988–1995	Football League	Referee
1995–2000	Premier League	Referee
2000–2002	Football League	Referee

International
Years	League	Role
—	—	—

Paul E. Alcock (27 October 1953 – 29 January 2018) was an English football referee, who operated in the English Football League and Premier League. He was based originally in the Redhill area before later moving to Halstead, Kent.

== Career ==
Alcock became a Football League linesman in 1982 at the age of twenty eight. He then spent six years at this level before progressing to full referee status. He joined the Premier League list in 1995.

His first appointment to this competition was the 2–1 home win by Coventry City over Manchester City at Highfield Road on 23 August 1995.

On 26 September 1998, in a match between Sheffield Wednesday and Arsenal at Hillsborough, he was pushed over by home team striker Paolo Di Canio after having issued the player with a red card. Di Canio was given an extended ban of 11 matches for his actions. Alcock continued refereeing Premier League matches without pause. His final match in that competition being the 0–0 draw between Liverpool and Southampton at Anfield on 7 May 2000. He returned to refereeing in the Football League, where he spent his final two seasons, retiring after the Norwich City versus Stockport County match in Division One on 21 April 2002.

Following his retirement from refereeing, Alcock was manager of a shopping centre in Maidstone, Kent, for seventeen years before stepping down in 2014.

Alcock died of cancer on 29 January 2018.
