= Daniel Barrett (footballer) =

English footballer

Personal information
- Date of birth: 25 September 1980 (age 46)
- Place of birth: Bradford, England
- Position: Defender

Senior career*
Years	Team	Apps	(Gls)
1999–2002	Chesterfield	3	(0)
2001	→ Stafford Rangers (loan)		
2002	→ Matlock Town (loan)		
- * Club domestic league appearances and goals

Daniel Barrett (born 25 September 1980 in Bradford, England) is a former footballer who played in The Football League for Chesterfield.
