= Phil Robinson (footballer, born 1967) =

English footballer and manager

Personal information
- Full name: Philip John Robinson
- Date of birth: 6 January 1967 (age 59)
- Place of birth: Stafford, England
- Height: 5 ft 9 in (1.75 m)
- Position: Midfielder

Senior career*
Years	Team	Apps	(Gls)
1985–1987	Aston Villa	3	(1)
1987–1989	Wolverhampton Wanderers	71	(8)
1989–1992	Notts County	66	(5)
1991	→ Birmingham City (loan)	9	(0)
1992–1994	Huddersfield Town	75	(5)
1994	→ Northampton Town (loan)	14	(0)
1994–1996	Chesterfield	61	(17)
1996–1998	Notts County	77	(5)
1998–2000	Stoke City	62	(2)
2000–2002	Hereford United	62	(5)
2000–2007	Stafford Rangers	67	(4)
Total		567	(52)

Managerial career
- 2002–2007: Stafford Rangers
- * Club domestic league appearances and goals

Philip John Robinson (born 6 January 1967) is an English former footballer who played as a midfielder for Aston Villa, Wolverhampton Wanderers, Notts County, Birmingham City, Huddersfield Town, Northampton Town, Chesterfield, Stoke City, Hereford United and Stafford Rangers. He is Manchester City's international youth scouting and recruitment manager.

== Career ==
Robinson was born in Stafford and began his career with Aston Villa in 1985. He then played for Wolverhampton Wanderers for two seasons which ended with back to back promotions and then achieved the same feat with Notts County. After a short loan spell with Birmingham City, during which he was part of the side that won the 1990–91 Associate Members' Cup, Robinson played two years at Huddersfield Town and played on loan for Northampton Town before joining Chesterfield helping the side gain promotion 1994–95 and then made a return to Notts County where he enjoyed his fifth promotion in 1997–98. Robinson joined Stoke City in June 1998 and played 44 times in 1998–99 and was made captain by Gary Megson for the 1999–2000 campaign. He then went on to play for Hereford United to later become player-coach under manager Graham Turner.

Robinson spent six years as manager of home-town club Stafford Rangers. Appointed in summer 2002 after a spell with Hereford United, he guided the team to four high-finishing positions in the league, promotion back to the Conference, three Staffordshire Senior Cup finals, FA Cup first round three times and FA Trophy quarter-finals. He resigned on 2 December 2007.

== Later career ==
He graduated from the University of Salford in 1999 with a degree in physiotherapy.

In June 2008, he took up a temporary coaching role with Cheltenham Town to cover for the absence through injury of Bob Bloomer. In October 2008, he joined Birmingham City to oversee recruitment to their Academy. Robinson was then appointed as head of talent identification at Aston Villa before joining Manchester City as international youth scouting and recruitment manager.

== Career statistics ==
Appearances and goals by club, season and competition
Club	Season	League			FA Cup		League Cup		Other		Total	
Club	Season	Division	Apps	Goals	Apps	Goals	Apps	Goals	Apps	Goals	Apps	Goals
Aston Villa	1986–87	First Division	3	1	0	0	0	0	0	0	3	1
Wolverhampton Wanderers	1987–88	Fourth Division	41	5	2	1	4	0	7	0	54	6
Wolverhampton Wanderers	1988–89	Third Division	30	3	1	0	2	0	3	0	36	3
Wolverhampton Wanderers	Total		71	8	3	1	6	0	10	0	90	9
Notts County	1989–90	Third Division	46	2	1	0	2	1	9	0	58	3
Notts County	1990–91	Second Division	19	3	1	0	4	1	1	0	25	4
Notts County	1991–92	First Division	1	0	0	0	0	0	0	0	1	0
Notts County	Total		66	5	2	0	6	2	10	0	84	6
Birmingham City (loan)	1990–91	Third Division	9	0	0	0	0	0	3	0	12	0
Huddersfield Town	1992–93	Second Division	36	4	6	1	1	0	2	0	45	5
Huddersfield Town	1993–94	Second Division	39	1	2	0	3	0	6	0	50	1
Huddersfield Town	Total		75	5	8	0	4	0	8	0	95	6
Northampton Town (loan)	1994–95	Third Division	14	0	1	0	1	0	2	0	18	0
Chesterfield	1994–95	Third Division	22	8	0	0	0	0	3	2	25	10
Chesterfield	1995–96	Third Division	39	9	2	0	1	0	5	2	47	11
Chesterfield	Total		61	17	2	0	1	0	8	4	72	21
Notts County	1996–97	Second Division	37	2	4	1	2	0	0	0	44	3
Notts County	1997–98	Third Division	40	3	3	0	2	0	1	0	46	3
Notts County	Total		77	5	7	1	4	0	1	0	90	6
Stoke City	1998–99	Second Division	40	1	2	0	2	0	0	0	44	1
Stoke City	1999–2000	Second Division	22	1	1	0	2	0	2	0	27	1
Stoke City	Total		62	2	3	0	4	0	2	0	71	2
Hereford United	2000–01	Football Conference	40	2	0	0	0	0	6	0	46	2
Hereford United	2001–02	Football Conference	22	4	1	0	0	0	0	0	23	4
Hereford United	Total		62	6	1	0	0	0	6	0	69	6
Career total			500	49	26	3	26	2	44	4	603	58

== Honours ==
Wolverhampton Wanderers

- Football League Third Division: 1988–89
- Football League Fourth Division: 1987–88
- Associate Members' Cup: 1987–88

Notts County

- Football League Third Division play-offs: 1990
- Football League Third Division: 1997–98

Birmingham City

- Associate Members' Cup: 1990–91

Huddersfield Town

- Football League Trophy runner-up: 1993–94

Chesterfield

- Football League Third Division play-offs: 1995
