= Andy Mitchell (footballer, born 1976) =

English footballer

Personal information
- Full name: Andrew Barry Mitchell
- Date of birth: 12 September 1976 (age 50)
- Place of birth: Rotherham, England
- Position: Defender

Youth career
- 1993–1995: Aston Villa

Senior career*
Years	Team	Apps	(Gls)
1995–1996	Aston Villa	0	(0)
1996–1997	Chesterfield	2	(0)
1997	Boston United	1	(0)
1997–1998	Belper Town		
- * Club domestic league appearances and goals

Andrew Barry Mitchell (born 12 September 1976) is an English former professional footballer who played in the Football League as a defender.
