= Jamie Lomas (footballer) =

English footballer (born 1977)

Personal information
- Date of birth: 18 October 1977 (age 49)
- Place of birth: Chesterfield, England
- Position: Midfielder

Senior career*
Years	Team	Apps	(Gls)
1992–2000	Chesterfield	29	(0)
2000–2002	Mansfield Town	6	(0)
- * Club domestic league appearances and goals

Jamie Lomas (born 18 October 1977 in Chesterfield, England) is a footballer who played in The Football League for Chesterfield and Mansfield Town.

== Career ==
Lomas started his career at his local team Chesterfield however despite spending eight years at Saltergate he only made 38 appearances and scored one goal which came in a shock 2–1 defeat to non-league Enfield in the FA Cup. He left to join local rivals Mansfield Town in May 2000. His career was ended by a serious knee ligament which he ironically suffered on his return to Chesterfield in the Miners Derby. He never recovered and retired from football.
