= Steve Payne (footballer) =

English footballer

Stephen Payne
Personal information
- Date of birth: 1 August 1975 (age 51)
- Place of birth: Castleford, England
- Position: Defender

Youth career
- Huddersfield Town

Senior career*
Years	Team	Apps	(Gls)
1993–1994	Huddersfield Town	0	(0)
1994	→Macclesfield Town (loan)	12	(1)
1994–1999	Macclesfield Town	177	(5)
1999–2004	Chesterfield	145	(5)
2004–2005	Macclesfield Town	13	(0)
2005–2007	Northwich Victoria	11	(4)
2007–2008	Stalybridge Celtic	34	(6)
2008–2010	FC Halifax Town	44	(9)
- * Club domestic league appearances and goals as of 14:37, 7 October 2008 (UTC)

Stephen Payne (born 1 August 1975) is an English former footballer, He signed for FC Halifax Town in July 2008 but his first season was blighted by injury. Steve returned for the 2009–2010 season and played an integral part as FC Halifax Town won the league, wearing the captain's armband for most of it. His final game was against Skelmersdale United at The Shay when he was substituted with a few minutes to go so the rest of the players, management and supporters could pay tribute to his fantastic effort in football.

Stephen started his playing career at Huddersfield Town.

Payne scored the 1st goal for Macclesfield Town in their 3-1 FA Trophy final victory over Northwich Victoria on 19 May 1996.
