= Tony Rigby =

English footballer

Personal information
- Date of birth: 10 August 1972 (age 54)
- Place of birth: Ormskirk, England
- Position: Midfielder

Senior career*
Years	Team	Apps	(Gls)
1990–1991	Crewe Alexandra	0	(0)
1991	Lancaster City		
1991–1992	Burscough		
1992	Barrow		
1992–1999	Bury	166	(19)
1996–1997	→ Scarborough (loan)	5	(1)
1999–2000	Shrewsbury Town	8	(1)
- Burscough
Total		179	(21)
- * Club domestic league appearances and goals

Tony Rigby (born 10 August 1972) is an English former professional footballer who played as a midfielder, making over 150 career appearances.

== Career ==
Born in Ormskirk, Rigby played for Crewe Alexandra, Lancaster City, Burscough, Barrow, Bury, Scarborough and Shrewsbury Town.

== Honours ==
Bury

- Football League Second Division: 1996–97

Individual

- PFA Team of the Year: 1993–94 Third Division
