= Chris Perkins (footballer) =

English footballer

Personal information
- Date of birth: 9 January 1974 (age 52)
- Place of birth: Nottingham, England
- Position: Midfielder

Senior career*
| Years | Team | Apps | (Gls) |
| 1992–1994 | Mansfield Town | 8 | (0) |
| 1994–1999 | Chesterfield | 147 | (3) |
| 1999–2000 | Hartlepool United | 8 | (0) |
| 1999 | → Chesterfield (loan) | 8 | (0) |
| 1999–2000 | → Chesterfield (loan) | 23 | (0) |
| 2000–2001 | Chesterfield | 8 | (0) |
| 2001 | Lincoln City | 12 | (1) |
| 2002 | Stalybridge Celtic | | |
| 2003 | Lancaster City | | |
| 2004 | Rossendale United | | |
| 2005 | Chorley | | |
- * Club domestic league appearances and goals

Christopher Perkins (born 9 January 1974) is an English former footballer who played in the Football League for Chesterfield, Hartlepool United, Lincoln City and Mansfield Town.

== Playing career ==
Perkins started his football career at Mansfield Town before joining Chesterfield in 1994. He went on to make over 150 appearances for the Spireites. During his time at Saltergate, Perkins found himself playing in the famous F.A Cup run during the 1996–97 season. He joined Hartlepool United in 1999, however he soon re-joined Chesterfield on loan, then permanently before ending his professional career with Lincoln City. He went on to play for non-league sides Stalybridge Celtic, Lancaster City, Rossendale United and Chorley.

== Later career ==
After finishing as a full-time professional, Perkins became a sports marketing manager for Reebok UK in September 2002. He then became an account manager for Scout7 in 2008, then was a sports marketing manager for the adidas group from September 2008 to November 2014.

Perkins left to become the Head of Academy Recruitment at Derby County in 2014. He joined Everton as Head of Academy Recruitment in March 2020 and moved to the similar role of Head of Emerging Talent at Tottenham Hotspur's Academy in October 2021. On 31 January 2023, Perkins left Tottenham to become a professional development phase scout at Arsenal's academy.

== Honours ==
Chesterfield

- Football League Third Division play-offs: 1995
