= Jonathan Howard (footballer) =

English footballer

Jon Howard
Personal information
- Date of birth: 7 October 1971 (age 55)
- Place of birth: Sheffield, England
- Position: Forward

Senior career*
Years	Team	Apps	(Gls)
1990–1994	Rotherham United	36	(5)
1994	Buxton		
1994–2003	Chesterfield	236	(39)
2003	→ Burton Albion (loan)	8	(2)
2003–2004	Burton Albion	36	(4)
- * Club domestic league appearances and goals

Jonathan Howard (born 7 October 1971) is a footballer who played in The Football League for Chesterfield and Rotherham United and was part of the Chesterfield FC side which enjoyed a famous FA Cup run during the 1996–97 football campaign.

== Career ==
Howard started his career at Rotherham United scoring 5 goals in 36 league games for the Millers. He joined Chesterfield in 1994 and went on to amass over 230 appearances for the club in over nine years. During his time with the Spireites, Howard was involved in the famous FA Cup run in the 1996–97 season which saw Chesterfield reach the semi-finals of the competition. He scored a brace as they knocked out Bristol City in the third round, and went on to win the decisive penalty which teammate Tom Curtis tucked away against Nottingham Forest in the fifth round of the competition. He also found himself at the centre of controversy when, in the semi-final which saw the Spireites up against Middlesbrough F.C at Old Trafford, he took a shot which hit the underside of the crossbar and appeared to cross the line and yet the goal was never given. Had it been awarded as a goal it would have put Chesterfield 3–1 up against 10 man Middlesbrough (after the earlier dismissal of Vladimír Kinder) with just over 20 minutes remaining. As it was, Middlesbrough equalised to make it 2–2 after 90 minutes, it finished 3–3 after extra time and Chesterfield lost the replay 3–0. Ironically, both the Forest and Middlesbrough games were refereed by David Elleray. He finished his career with Burton Albion.

== Honours ==
Chesterfield

- Football League Third Division play-offs: 1995
