= 1995 Football League play-offs =

Football League play-offs
- Season: 1994–95
- Champions: Bolton Wanderers (First Division); Huddersfield Town (Second Division); Chesterfield (Third Division)
- Matches played: 15
- Goals scored: 38 (2.53 per match)
- Biggest home win: Chesterfield 5–2 Mansfield (Third Division)
- Biggest away win: Tranmere 1–3 Reading (First Division)
- Highest scoring: Bolton 4–3 Reading; Chesterfield 5–2 Mansfield (7 goals)
- Highest attendance: 64,107 – Bolton v Reading (First Division final)
- Lowest attendance: 6,562 – Mansfield v Chesterfield (Third Division semi-final)
- Average attendance: 19,686

The Football League play-offs for the 1994–95 season were held in May 1995, with the finals taking place at Wembley Stadium in London. The play-off semi-finals were played over two legs and were contested by the teams who finished in 2nd, 3rd, 4th and 5th place in the Football League First Division and Football League Second Division and the 3rd, 4th, 5th, and 6th placed teams in the Football League Third Division table. The winners of the semi-finals progressed through to the finals, with the winner of these matches gaining promotion for the following season.

== Background ==
The Football League play-offs have been held every year since 1987. They take place for each division following the conclusion of the regular season and are contested by the four clubs finishing below the automatic promotion places.

== First Division ==
Pos	Team	Pld	W	D	L	GF	GA	GD	Pts
2	Reading	46	23	10	13	58	44	+14	79
3	Bolton Wanderers	46	21	14	11	67	45	+22	77
4	Wolverhampton Wanderers	46	21	13	12	77	61	+16	76
5	Tranmere Rovers	46	22	10	14	67	58	+9	76

=== Semi-finals ===
First leg

14 May 1995
14:55

Tranmere Rovers	1–3	Reading
Malkin 14'		Lovell 9', 81'; Nogan 74'

Prenton Park, Birkenhead
Attendance: 12,207
Referee: John Kirkby

14 May 1995
14:55

Wolverhampton Wanderers	2–1	Bolton Wanderers
Bull 44'; Venus 51'		McAteer 46'

Molineux, Wolverhampton
Attendance: 26,153
Referee: Philip Wright

Second leg

17 May 1995
19:30

Bolton Wanderers	2–0 (a.e.t.)	Wolverhampton Wanderers
McGinlay 44', 109'

Burnden Park, Bolton
Attendance: 20,041
Referee: Steve Dunn

Bolton Wanderers won 3–2 on aggregate.

17 May 1995
19:45

Reading	0–0	Tranmere Rovers

Elm Park, Reading
Attendance: 13,245
Referee: Paul Alcock

Reading won 3–1 on aggregate.

=== Final ===
29 May 1995
13:30

Bolton Wanderers	4–3 (a.e.t.)	Reading
Coyle 76'; De Freitas 86', 119'; Paatelainen 105+1'		Nogan 4'; Williams 12'; Quinn 120'

Wembley Stadium, London
Attendance: 64,107
Referee: Peter Foakes

== Second Division ==
Pos	Team	Pld	W	D	L	GF	GA	GD	Pts
2	Brentford	46	25	10	11	81	39	+42	85
3	Crewe Alexandra	46	25	8	13	80	68	+12	83
4	Bristol Rovers	46	22	16	8	70	40	+30	82
5	Huddersfield Town	46	22	15	9	79	49	+30	81

=== Semi-finals ===
First leg

14 May 1995
15:00

Bristol Rovers	0–0	Crewe Alexandra

Twerton Park, Bath
Attendance: 8,538

14 May 1995
15:00

Huddersfield Town	1–1	Brentford
Billy 9'		Forster 42'

Alfred McAlpine Stadium, Huddersfield
Attendance: 14,160
Referee: Steve Dunn

Second leg

17 May 1995
19:30

Crewe Alexandra	1–1 (a.e.t.)	Bristol Rovers
Rowbotham 97'		Miller 106'

Gresty Road, Crewe
Attendance: 6,578

Crewe Alexandra 1–1 Bristol Rovers on aggregate. Bristol Rovers won on away goals.

17 May 1995
19:45

Brentford	1–1 (a.e.t.)	Huddersfield Town
Grainger 18' (pen.)		Booth 30'
Penalties
Grainger (penalty scored); Taylor (penalty scored); Mundee (penalty missed); Ratcliffe (penalty scored); Bates (penalty missed)	3–4	(penalty scored) Jepson; (penalty missed) Scully; (penalty scored) Sinnott; (penalty scored) Duxbury; (penalty scored) Bullock

Griffin Park, London
Attendance: 11,161
Referee: Peter Foakes

Brentford 2–2 Huddersfield Town on aggregate. Huddersfield Town won 4–3 on penalties.

=== Final ===
28 May 1995
15:00

Bristol Rovers	1–2	Huddersfield Town
Stewart 45'		Booth 45'; Billy 81'

Wembley Stadium, London
Attendance: 59,175
Referee: Clive Wilkes

== Third Division ==
Pos	Team	Pld	W	D	L	GF	GA	GD	Pts
3	Chesterfield	42	23	12	7	62	37	+25	81
4	Bury	42	23	11	8	73	36	+37	80
5	Preston North End	42	19	10	13	58	41	+17	67
6	Mansfield Town	42	18	11	13	84	59	+25	65

=== Semi-finals ===
First leg

14 May 1995
12:00

Mansfield Town	1–1	Chesterfield
Hadley 72'		Robinson 64'

Field Mill, Mansfield
Attendance: 6,562

14 May 1995
15:00

Preston North End	0–1	Bury
		Pugh 40'

Deepdale, Preston
Attendance: 13,297

Second leg

17 May 1995
19:30

Bury	1–0	Preston North End
Rigby 88'

Gigg Lane, Bury
Attendance: 9,094

Bury won 2–0 on aggregate.

17 May 1995
19:30

Chesterfield	5–2 (a.e.t.)	Mansfield Town
Lormor 27'; Robinson 56'; Law 95' (pen.), 101'; Howard 115'		Holland 3'; Wilkinson 32'

Saltergate, Chesterfield
Attendance: 8,165
Referee: Clive Wilkes

Chesterfield won 6–3 on aggregate.

=== Final ===
27 May 1995
15:00

Bury	0–2	Chesterfield
		Lormor 23'; Robinson 41'

Wembley Stadium, London
Attendance: 22,814
Referee: Paul Alcock
