= Jamie Hewitt (footballer) =

English footballer

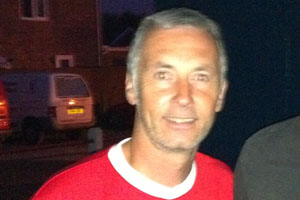

Personal information
- Date of birth: 17 May 1968 (age 58)
- Place of birth: Chesterfield, England
- Height: 5 ft 10 in (1.78 m)
- Position: Defender

Team information
- Current team: Chesterfield (physio)

Youth career
- Chesterfield

Senior career*
Years	Team	Apps	(Gls)
1986–1992	Chesterfield	249	(14)
1992–1993	Doncaster Rovers	33	(0)
1993–2002	Chesterfield	257	(12)
Total		539	(26)
- * Club domestic league appearances and goals

Jamie Hewitt (born 17 May 1968) is an English former footballer who spent the majority of his playing career as a defender for his hometown club Chesterfield, where he made more than 500 league appearances. He also spent one season at Doncaster Rovers.

Hewitt was a member of the Chesterfield 1997 FA Cup team that made it to the semi-finals. In the semi-final at Old Trafford, Chesterfield were trailing Premiership Middlesbrough 3–2 in extra time when he headed in a 119th-minute equaliser. Chesterfield however lost the replay 3–0. He is classed as a legend by the Chesterfield fans because of this and also his great career for the club. He later worked at the club as a physiotherapist.

== Personal life ==
His uncle, Ron Hewitt, played in the Football League for Lincoln City in the 1940s.

== Honours ==
Chesterfield

- Football League Third Division play-offs: 1995
