= 1998–99 Rochdale A.F.C. season =

English football club season

Rochdale
1998–99 season
- Manager: Graham Barrow; David Hamilton
- Third Division: 18th
- FA Cup: Second round
- League Cup: First round
- Top goalscorer: League: Michael Holt; Andy Morris; All: Michael Holt; Andy Morris

The 1998–99 season was Rochdale A.F.C.'s 92nd in existence and their 25th consecutive in the fourth tier of the English football league, named at the time as the Football League Third Division.

== Statistics ==
No.	Pos	Nat	Player	Total		Division 3		F.A. Cup		League Cup		League Trophy		Lancashire Cup	
No.	Pos	Nat	Player	Apps	Goals	Apps	Goals	Apps	Goals	Apps	Goals	Apps	Goals	Apps	Goals
	GK	(Wales) WAL	Neil Edwards	55	0	45+0	0	3+1	0	2+0	0	3+0	0	1+0	0
	DF	(England) ENG	Paul Sparrow	34	2	21+4	2	4+0	0	1+0	0	1+1	0	2+0	0
	DF	(England) ENG	Dean Stokes	16	0	10+1	0	0+0	0	2+0	0	1+0	0	2+0	0
	DF	(England) ENG	Keith Hill	40	1	33+0	1	4+0	0	2+0	0	1+0	0	0+0	0
	DF	(England) ENG	David Bayliss	33	1	22+3	1	0+2	0	2+0	0	2+1	0	1+0	0
	DF	(England) ENG	Alan Johnson	21	0	13+3	0	1+0	0	2+0	0	0+0	0	2+0	0
	MF	(England) ENG	Andy Farrell	48	0	36+2	0	2+1	0	2+0	0	3+0	0	2+0	0
	FW	(England) ENG	Graham Lancashire	17	6	7+4	3	1+0	0	1+1	0	0+1	0	2+0	3
	FW	(England) ENG	Mark Leonard	11	0	2+6	0	0+0	0	1+0	0	0+0	0	1+1	0
	MF	(England) ENG	Jason Peake	49	7	36+2	5	4+0	0	2+0	0	3+0	0	2+0	2
	MF	(England) ENG	Mark Stuart	25	0	9+10	0	4+0	0	0+0	0	0+0	0	2+0	0
	FW	(England) ENG	David Gray	4	0	0+3	0	0+0	0	0+0	0	0+0	0	0+1	0
	DF	(England) ENG	Mark Bailey	22	1	12+7	1	0+0	0	1+1	0	1+0	0	0+0	0
	MF	(England) ENG	Gary Jones	28	1	11+9	0	1+2	0	1+0	0	1+1	1	2+0	0
	MF	(Spain) ESP	Isidro Díaz	18	2	12+2	2	1+2	0	1+0	0	0+0	0	0+0	0
	FW	(England) ENG	Robbie Painter	50	6	35+5	6	4+0	0	1+0	0	1+2	0	1+1	0
	MF	(Scotland) SCO	Ian Bryson	44	2	31+8	0	4+0	2	1+0	0	0+0	0	0+0	0
	DF	(England) ENG	Mark Monington	45	5	37+0	3	4+0	1	0+0	0	3+0	1	1+0	0
	DF	(England) ENG	Mark Williams	18	1	11+3	1	4+0	0	0+0	0	0+0	0	0+0	0
	DF	(England) ENG	Andy Barlow	32	1	25+4	1	0+1	0	0+0	0	2+0	0	0+0	0
	FW	(England) ENG	Miguel de Souza	5	0	5+0	0	0+0	0	0+0	0	0+0	0	0+0	0
	FW	(England) ENG	Michael Holt	24	8	17+7	7	0+0	0	0+0	0	0+0	1	0+0	0
	MF	(England) ENG	Paul Carden	33	0	24+1	0	3+0	0	0+0	0	3+0	0	0+2	0
	FW	(England) ENG	Andy Morris	28	8	25+0	7	0+0	0	0+0	0	3+0	1	0+0	0
	GK	(England) ENG	Phil Priestley	1	0	1+0	0	0+0	0	0+0	0	0+0	0	0+0	0
	DF	(England) ENG	Jason Lydiate	17	1	14+0	1	0+0	0	0+0	0	3+0	0	0+0	0
	MF	(England) ENG	Gareth Stoker	14	1	11+1	1	0+0	0	0+0	0	2+0	0	0+0	0
	DF	(England) ENG	Graham Hicks	1	0	1+0	0	0+0	0	0+0	0	0+0	0	0+0	0
	GK	(England) ENG	Lance Key	2	0	0+0	0	1+0	0	0+0	0	0+0	0	1+0	0

== Final League Table ==
Pos	Team	Pld	W	D	L	GF	GA	GD	Pts
17	Brighton & Hove Albion	46	16	7	23	49	66	−17	55
18	Southend United	46	14	12	20	52	58	−6	54
19	Rochdale	46	13	15	18	42	55	−13	54
20	Torquay United	46	12	17	17	47	58	−11	53
21	Hull City	46	14	11	21	44	62	−18	53

Rules for classification: 1) Points; 2) Goals scored; 3) Goal difference

== Competitions ==
=== Football League Third Division ===
8 August 1998 1	Plymouth Argyle	2–1	Rochdale	Plymouth
	Mauge 52'; Jean 78'	Report	Lancashire 19' (pen.); Bayliss (yellow card); Peake (yellow card)	Stadium: Home Park; Attendance: 5547; Referee: LE Cable

15 August 1998 2	Rochdale	0–2	Torquay United	Rochdale
	Jones (yellow card)	Report	Partridge 14', 52'; Hill (yellow card)	Stadium: Spotland Stadium; Attendance: 1713; Referee: T Jones

22 August 1998 3	Carlisle United	0–1	Rochdale	Carlisle
	Anthony (yellow card)	Report	Díaz 82'	Stadium: Brunton Park; Attendance: 3627; Referee: MS Pike

29 August 1998 4	Rochdale	0–0	Darlington	Rochdale
		Report	Liddle (yellow card); De Vos (yellow card); Naylor (yellow card)	Stadium: Spotland Stadium; Attendance: 1953; Referee: P Dowd

31 August 1998 5	Brentford	2–1	Rochdale	Brentford
	Powell 2'; Rapley 71'; Rowlands (yellow card)	Report	Díaz 17'; Bailey (yellow card); Bayliss (yellow card); Farrell (yellow card); Bryson (yellow card)	Stadium: Griffin Park; Attendance: 4873; Referee: RJ Olivier

5 September 1998 6	Rochdale	1–0	Shrewsbury Town	Rochdale
	Bailey 22'	Report		Stadium: Spotland Stadium; Attendance: 1660; Referee: D Pugh

8 September 1998 7	Hull City	2–1	Rochdale	Hull
	Peacock 23'; Brown 63'; D'Auria (yellow card)	Report	Hill 50'; Edwards (yellow card); Farrell (yellow card)	Stadium: Boothferry Park; Attendance: 3433; Referee: ML Dean

12 September 1998 8	Rochdale	2–2	Scunthorpe United	Rochdale
	Painter 51' (pen.); Monington 67'; Edwards (yellow card)	Report	Forrester 8'; Stamp 89'	Stadium: Spotland Stadium; Attendance: 1929; Referee: T Heilbron

19 September 1998 9	Cardiff City	2–1	Rochdale	Cardiff
	Brazier 54'; Bonner 58' (yellow card); Thomas (yellow card)	Report	Painter 25'; Sparrow (yellow card)	Stadium: Ninian Park; Attendance: 4643; Referee: MR Warren

26 September 1998 10	Rochdale	2–1	Leyton Orient	Rochdale
	Lancashire 6' (yellow card); Painter 21'; Monington (red card) 69'; Barlow (yellow card)	Report	Smith 45'; Warren (yellow card)	Stadium: Spotland Stadium; Attendance: 1742; Referee: P Walton

3 October 1998 11	Southend United	1–1	Rochdale	Southend-on-Sea
	Maher 73'	Report	Lancashire 36'; Monington (yellow card)	Stadium: Roots Hall; Attendance: 3686; Referee: M Fletcher

11 October 1998 12	Rochdale	1–0	Halifax Town	Rochdale
	Williams 45'; Díaz (yellow card)	Report	Murphy (yellow card)	Stadium: Spotland Stadium; Attendance: 3628; Referee: P Rejer

17 October 1998 13	Peterborough United	2–0	Rochdale	Peterborough
	Farrell 11'; Grazioli 38'	Report	Monington (yellow card); Williams (yellow card); Lancashire (yellow card); Painter (yellow card)	Stadium: London Road Stadium; Attendance: 4536; Referee: KD Hill

20 October 1998 14	Rotherham United	2–2	Rochdale	Rotherham
	Fortune-West 25'; Glover 65'; Hurst (yellow card)	Report	Sparrow 36'; Monington 77'; Williams (yellow card)	Stadium: Millmoor; Attendance: 3105; Referee: SJ Baines

31 October 1998 15	Barnet	0–1	Rochdale	Chipping Barnet
		Report	Painter 65'	Stadium: Underhill Stadium; Attendance: 1413; Referee: KA Leach

7 November 1998 16	Rochdale	1–0	Mansfield Town	Rochdale
	Peake 47'; Jones (yellow card)	Report	Kerr (yellow card)	Stadium: Spotland Stadium; Attendance: 2142; Referee: PS Danson

10 November 1998 17	Rochdale	1–1	Exeter City	Rochdale
	Sparrow 36'; Hill (yellow card)	Report	Gittens 85' (yellow card); Flack (yellow card); Wilkinson (yellow card)	Stadium: Spotland Stadium; Attendance: 1639; Referee: KM Lynch

17 November 1998 18	Rochdale	0–1	Scarborough	Rochdale
		Report	Russell; Kay (yellow card)	Stadium: Spotland Stadium; Attendance: 1536; Referee: CJ Foy

21 November 1998 19	Chester City	1–1	Rochdale	Chester
	Wright 24'	Report	Holt 73'	Stadium: Deva Stadium; Attendance: 2495; Referee: WM Jordan

12 December 1998 20	Swansea City	1–1	Rochdale	Swansea
	Alsop 52'; Howard (yellow card)	Report	Peake 34'; Williams (yellow card) (yellow-red card) 80'; Hill (yellow card); Carden (yellow card); Farrell (yellow card); Holt (yellow card); Bryson (yellow card)	Stadium: Vetch Field; Attendance: 4010; Referee: LE Cable

19 December 1998 21	Rochdale	2–1	Brighton & Hove Albion	Rochdale
	Painter 69'; Monington 88'	Report	Mayo 65'; Browne (red card) 88'; Culverhouse (yellow card); Thomas (yellow card)	Stadium: Spotland Stadium; Attendance: 2153; Referee: B Coddington

26 December 1998 22	Rochdale	1–1	Carlisle United	Rochdale
	Peake 21'; Barlow (yellow card)	Report	Monington 83' (o.g.); Stevens (yellow card)	Stadium: Spotland Stadium; Attendance: 2900; Referee: AR Hall

28 December 1998 23	Hartlepool United	0–1	Rochdale	Hartlepool
		Report	Holt 79'; Bryson (yellow card)	Stadium: Victoria Park; Attendance: 2218; Referee: RD Furnandiz

2 January 1999 24	Darlington	3–0	Rochdale	Darlington
	Roberts 45'; Dorner 68'; Naylor 89'; Preece (yellow card)	Report		Stadium: Feethams; Attendance: 2807; Referee: RD Furnandiz

9 January 1999 25	Rochdale	1–1	Plymouth Argyle	Rochdale
	Holt 62'; Carden (yellow card)	Report	Branston 14'; Heathcote (yellow card); Marshall (yellow card)	Stadium: Spotland Stadium; Attendance: 1922; Referee: JA Kirkby

16 January 1999 26	Torquay United	2–1	Rochdale	Torquay
	Bedeau 16'; Partridge 70'	Report	Morris 90'; Johnson (yellow card); Stuart (yellow card)	Stadium: Plainmoor; Attendance: 2205; Referee: P Rejer

23 January 1999 27	Rochdale	2–0	Brentford	Rochdale
	Holt 48' (yellow card); Painter 51'; Carden (yellow card); Williams (yellow card)	Report	Quinn (yellow card)	Stadium: Spotland Stadium; Attendance: 2113; Referee: A Bates

30 January 1999 28	Rochdale	0–1	Hartlepool United	Rochdale
	Painter (yellow card)	Report	Clark 18'	Stadium: Spotland Stadium; Attendance: 1943; Referee: MS Pike

6 February 1999 29	Shrewsbury Town	3–2	Rochdale	Shrewsbury
	Steele 36', 43'; Brown 72'	Report	Peake 10'; Morris 75'; Monington (yellow card); Painter (yellow card)	Stadium: Gay Meadow; Attendance: 2561; Referee: MG Cowburn

12 February 1999 30	Rochdale	3–0	Hull City	Rochdale
	Holt 43', 49'; Morris 90'	Report		Stadium: Spotland Stadium; Attendance: 5374; Referee: WC Burns

20 February 1999 31	Scunthorpe United	0–1	Rochdale	Scunthorpe
	Wilcox (yellow card)	Report	Bayliss 84'; Stoker (yellow card); Holt (yellow card); Lydiate (yellow card)	Stadium: Glanford Park; Attendance: 3749; Referee: AN Butler

27 February 1999 32	Rochdale	1–1	Cardiff City	Rochdale
	Peake 44'	Report	Legg 76'	Stadium: Spotland Stadium; Attendance: 2431; Referee: G Cain

6 March 1999 33	Leyton Orient	3–0	Rochdale	London
	Ampadu 44' (yellow card); Griffiths 62', 70'; Richards (yellow card)	Report	Stoker (yellow card)	Stadium: Brisbane Road; Attendance: 4927; Referee: KD Hill

13 March 1999 34	Mansfield Town	3–1	Rochdale	Mansfield
	L'Helgoualch 2'; Ryder 56'; Clarke 68'	Report	Lydiate 50'	Stadium: Field Mill; Attendance: 2555; Referee: MR Halsey

20 March 1999 35	Rochdale	0–0	Barnet	Rochdale
	Stoker (yellow card); Lydiate (yellow card)	Report	Heald (yellow card); Sawyers (yellow card); Wilson (yellow card)	Stadium: Spotland Stadium; Attendance: 1502; Referee: B Coddington

26 March 1999 36	Scarborough	1–0	Rochdale	Scarborough
	Brodie 11'	Report	Holt (yellow card)	Stadium: Athletic Ground; Attendance: 2206; Referee: G Laws

30 March 1999 37	Rochdale	1–0	Southend United	Rochdale
	Morris 31'; Monington (yellow card); Carden (yellow card); Lydiate (yellow card)	Report		Stadium: Spotland Stadium; Attendance: 1344; Referee: D Laws

3 April 1999 38	Rochdale	0–3	Peterborough United	Rochdale
	Bailey (yellow card); Stoker (yellow card)	Report	Davies 36'; Grazioli 46', 74' (yellow card); Edwards (yellow card)	Stadium: Spotland Stadium; Attendance: 1696; Referee: T Jones

5 April 1999 39	Halifax Town	0–0	Rochdale	Halifax
	Stansfield (yellow card); Paterson (yellow card)	Report	Stoker (yellow card); Painter (yellow card); Lydiate (yellow card)	Stadium: The Shay; Attendance: 2759; Referee: P Dowd

10 April 1999 40	Rochdale	0–0	Rotherham United	Rochdale
	Bayliss (yellow card); Barlow (yellow card)	Report		Stadium: Spotland Stadium; Attendance: 2516; Referee: MD Messias

13 April 1999 41	Cambridge United	1–1	Rochdale	Cambridge
	Walker 86'	Report	Stoker 29'; Bayliss (yellow card); Farrell (yellow card)	Stadium: Abbey Stadium; Attendance: 4690; Referee: AP D'Urso

17 April 1999 42	Rochdale	3–1	Chester City	Rochdale
	Morris 60', 78', 88'; Hill (yellow card)	Report	Beckett 25'	Stadium: Spotland Stadium; Attendance: 1712; Referee: FG Stretton

24 April 1999 43	Exeter City	2–1	Rochdale	Exeter
	Curran 45'; Fry 75'; Flack (yellow card)	Report	Holt 65'; Carden (yellow card)	Stadium: St James Park; Attendance: 2543; Referee: RJ Olivier

27 April 1999 44	Rochdale	0–2	Cambridge United	Rochdale
	Farrell (yellow card)	Report	Taylor 83' (pen.), 88'; Campbell (yellow card)	Stadium: Spotland Stadium; Attendance: 1408; Referee: GB Frankland

1 May 1999 45	Rochdale	0–3	Swansea City	Rochdale
	Bryson (yellow card); Monington (yellow card) (yellow-red card) 51'	Report	Price 13', 66'; Alsop 49'; Jones (yellow card)	Stadium: Spotland Stadium; Attendance: 1654; Referee: JP Robinson

8 May 1999 46	Brighton & Hove Albion	1–1	Rochdale	Brighton and Hove
	Barker 32'; Minton (yellow card)	Report	Barlow 89'; Jones (yellow card)	Stadium: Goldstone Ground; Attendance: 4646; Referee: A Bates

=== F.A. Cup ===
14 November 1998 1	Scarborough	1–1	Rochdale	Scarborough
	Williams 47'	Report	Bryson 75'; Sparrow (yellow card); Farrell (yellow card)	Stadium: Athletic Ground; Attendance: 1860; Referee: ML Dean

24 November 1998 1	Rochdale	2–0	Scarborough	Rochdale
	Monington 8'; Sparrow (red card) 44'; Bryson 89'; Williams (yellow card); Díaz (yellow card)	Report	Hoyland (yellow card); Atkinson (yellow card); Worrall (yellow card); Morris (yellow card)	Stadium: Spotland Stadium; Attendance: 1850; Referee: ML Dean

5 December 1998 2	Rochdale	0–0	Rotherham United	Rochdale
		Report		Stadium: Spotland Stadium; Attendance: 3346; Referee: P Walton

15 December 1998 2	Rotherham United	4–0	Rochdale	Rotherham
	Garner 39'; Berry 47'; Glover 59'; Scott 65'; Warner (yellow card); Ingledow (yellow card)	Report	Monington (red card) 22'; Sparrow (yellow card); Hill (yellow card)	Stadium: Millmoor; Attendance: 3424; Referee: P Walton

=== Football League Cup (Worthington Cup) ===
11 August 1998 1	Wigan Athletic	1–0	Rochdale	Wigan
	Hill 55' (o.g.)	Report		Stadium: Springfield Park; Attendance: 2252; Referee: MT Leek

18 August 1998 1	Rochdale	0–1 (0–2 agg.)	Wigan Athletic	Rochdale
	Bailey (yellow card); Painter (yellow card)	Report	Lee	Stadium: Spotland Stadium; Attendance: 1697; Referee: EK Wolstenholme

=== Football League Trophy (Auto Windscreens Shield) ===
2 February 1999 2	Stoke City	2–1	Rochdale	Stoke-on-Trent
	Crowe 88'; Woods (yellow card); Sigurðsson (yellow card)	Report	Morris 1'; Holt 5'; Hill (yellow card); Peake (yellow card)	Stadium: Britannia Stadium; Attendance: 7361; Referee: CJ Foy

23 February 1999 NQF	Rochdale	2–1	Halifax Town	Halifax
	Jones 57' (pen.); Monington 94'; Bayliss (yellow card); Peake (yellow card); Stoker (yellow card)	Report	Bradshaw 77' (pen.); Sertori (yellow card); Lloyd-Williams (yellow card)	Stadium: The Shay; Attendance: 2327; Referee: ML Dean

8 March 1999 NSF	Rochdale	0–2	Wigan Athletic	Rochdale
	Stoker (yellow card); Holt (yellow card)	Report	Barlow 30'; O'Neill 70'; Sharp (yellow card); Bradshaw (yellow card); Liddell (yellow card)	Stadium: Spotland Stadium; Attendance: 2484; Referee: MJ Jones

=== Lancashire Cup ===
21 July 1998 SF	Rochdale	4–0	Oldham Athletic	Rochdale
	Lancashire; Peake			Stadium: Spotland Stadium; Attendance: 902

28 July 1998 F	Wigan Athletic	3–1	Rochdale	Wigan
	Goal		Lancashire	Stadium: Springfield Park
