= 1999–2000 Rochdale A.F.C. season =

English football club season

Rochdale
1999–2000 season
- Chairman: David Kilpatrick
- Manager: Steve Parkin
- Third Division: 10th
- FA Cup: Second round
- League Cup: First round
- Top goalscorer: League: Tony Ellis (11); All: Tony Ellis (11)

The 1999–2000 season was Rochdale A.F.C.'s 93rd in existence and their 26th consecutive in the fourth tier of the English football league, named at the time as the Football League Third Division.

== Statistics ==
No.	Pos	Nat	Player	Total		League Division 3		FA Cup		League Cup		League Trophy	
No.	Pos	Nat	Player	Apps	Goals	Apps	Goals	Apps	Goals	Apps	Goals	Apps	Goals
	MF	(England) ENG	Graeme Atkinson	50	7	32 + 8	6	3 + 0	1	2 + 0	0	4 + 1	0
	DF	(England) ENG	Dave Bayliss	36	3	26 + 3	3	2 + 0	0	2 + 0	0	3 + 0	0
	MF	(England) ENG	Chris Bettney	30	0	12 + 12	0	0 + 1	0	0 + 0	0	3 + 2	0
	MF	(England) ENG	Paul Carden	17	0	3 + 10	0	0 + 1	0	0 + 2	0	0 + 1	0
	FW	(England) ENG	Julian Dowe	9	1	1 + 6	0	1 + 1	1	0 + 0	0	0 + 0	0
	DF	(England) ENG	Lee Duffy	0	0	0 + 0	0	0 + 0	0	0 + 0	0	0 + 0	0
	GK	(Wales) WAL	Neil Edwards	49	0	40 + 0	0	3 + 0	0	2 + 0	0	4 + 0	0
	FW	(England) ENG	Tony Ellis	37	11	30 + 1	11	1 + 0	0	0 + 0	0	4 + 1	0
	DF	(Wales) WAL	Wayne Evans	56	2	46 + 0	1	3 + 0	0	2 + 0	1	5 + 0	0
	MF	(England) ENG	David Flitcroft	53	2	40 + 3	2	1 + 2	0	2 + 0	0	5 + 0	0
	DF	(England) ENG	Tony Ford	43	2	28 + 6	2	3 + 0	0	2 + 0	0	3 + 1	0
	GK	(England) ENG	Paul Gibson	5	0	5 + 0	0	0 + 0	0	0 + 0	0	0 + 0	0
	DF	(England) ENG	Richard Green	6	0	6 + 0	0	0 + 0	0	0 + 0	0	0 + 0	0
	DF	(England) ENG	Graham Hicks	1	0	0 + 0	0	1 + 0	0	0 + 0	0	0 + 0	0
	DF	(England) ENG	Keith Hill	44	1	37 + 1	0	0 + 0	0	2 + 0	0	4 + 0	1
	FW	(England) ENG	Michael Holt	19	1	8 + 5	0	1 + 1	0	1 + 1	0	0 + 2	1
	DF	(England) ENG	Alan Johnson	0	0	0 + 0	0	0 + 0	0	0 + 0	0	0 + 0	0
	MF	(England) ENG	Gary Jones	47	6	31 + 8	6	2 + 1	0	0 + 0	0	4 + 1	0
	FW	(England) ENG	Graham Lancashire	34	10	21 + 8	8	0 + 0	0	2 + 0	1	2 + 1	1
	DF	(England) ENG	Sean McAuley	13	0	10 + 3	0	0 + 0	0	0 + 0	0	0 + 0	0
	MF	(Republic of Ireland) IRL	Sean McClare	9	0	5 + 4	0	0 + 0	0	0 + 0	0	0 + 0	0
	DF	(England) ENG	Mark Monington	31	4	22 + 2	2	3 + 0	0	0 + 0	0	4 + 0	2
	FW	(England) ENG	Andy Morris	9	0	1 + 6	0	0 + 0	0	1 + 1	0	0 + 0	0
	MF	(England) ENG	Jason Peake	51	7	38 + 5	6	3 + 0	1	2 + 0	0	3 + 0	0
	MF	(England) ENG	Warren Peyton	1	0	1 + 0	0	0 + 0	0	0 + 0	0	0 + 0	0
	FW	(England) ENG	Clive Platt	48	10	31 + 10	9	3 + 0	1	0 + 0	0	4 + 0	0
	GK	(England) ENG	Phil Priestley	3	0	1 + 1	0	0 + 0	0	0 + 0	0	1 + 0	0
	DF	(Wales) WAL	Damon Searle	14	0	13 + 1	0	0 + 0	0	0 + 0	0	0 + 0	0
	DF	(England) ENG	Dean Stokes	26	0	18 + 1	0	3 + 0	0	2 + 0	0	2 + 0	0
	DF	(England) ENG	Danny Taylor	1	0	0 + 1	0	0 + 0	0	0 + 0	0	0 + 0	0
	MF	(England) ENG	Scott Wilson	1	0	0 + 1	0	0 + 0	0	0 + 0	0	0 + 0	0

== Competitions ==
=== Football League Third Division ===
7 August 1999 1	Cheltenham Town	0–2	Rochdale	Cheltenham
	Howells (yellow card)	Report	Atkinson 26'; Ford 42'; Hill (yellow card); Lancashire (yellow card)	Stadium: Whaddon Road; Attendance: 5189; Referee: P Taylor

14 August 1999 2	Rochdale	2–0	Southend United	Rochdale
	Platt 12' (yellow card); Peake 32'; Flitcroft (yellow card) (yellow-red card) 46'	Report	Morley (yellow card); Booty (yellow card); Clarke (yellow card)	Stadium: Spotland Stadium; Attendance: 2253; Referee: Paul Robinson

21 August 1999 3	York City	0–3	Rochdale	York
		Report	Lancashire 33'; Platt 56'; Atkinson 61'	Stadium: Bootham Crescent; Attendance: 3034; Referee: G Cain

28 August 1999 4	Rochdale	0–2	Exeter City	Rochdale
	Hill (yellow card); Lancashire (yellow card)	Report	Gale 75'; Speakman 77'; Power (yellow card)	Stadium: Spotland Stadium; Attendance: 3113; Referee: G Laws

30 August 1999 5	Chester City	0–2	Rochdale	Chester
	Davidson (yellow card); Moss (yellow card) (yellow-red card) 79'; Fisher (yellow card); Shelton (yellow card)	Report	Atkinson 28'; Platt 71'; Hill (yellow card); Bayliss (yellow card)	Stadium: Deva Stadium; Attendance: 2644; Referee: Chris Foy

3 September 1999 6	Rochdale	0–1	Halifax Town	Rochdale
		Report	Mitchell 29'; Tate (yellow card)	Stadium: Spotland Stadium; Attendance: 4208; Referee: R D Furnandiz

11 September 1999 7	Rochdale	0–0	Darlington	Rochdale
	Hill (yellow card) (yellow-red card) 44'; Peake (yellow card); Holt (yellow card)	Report	Oliver (yellow card); Gray (yellow card)	Stadium: Spotland Stadium; Attendance: 3253; Referee: Richard Beeby

18 September 1999 8	Rotherham United	0–1	Rochdale	Rotherham
	Varty (yellow card)	Report	Monington (red card) 71'; Atkinson 90'; Evans (yellow card); Hill (yellow card)	Stadium: Millmoor; Attendance: 3568; Referee: K M Lynch

25 September 1999 9	Rochdale	0–0	Swansea City	Rochdale
		Report	Howard (yellow card)	Stadium: Spotland Stadium; Attendance: 2975; Referee: R Pearson

2 October 1999 10	Northampton Town	0–1	Rochdale	Northampton
	Howey (yellow card); Hunt (yellow card)	Report	Platt 41'; Evans (yellow card); Flitcroft (yellow card)	Stadium: Sixfields Stadium; Attendance: 4860; Referee: Steve Tomlin

9 October 1999 11	Barnet	1–0	Rochdale	Barnet
	Charlery 22'; Hackett (yellow card); Gledhill (yellow card); Doolan (yellow card); Currie (red card) 88'	Report	Platt (yellow card); Holt (yellow card); Carden (yellow card)	Stadium: Underhill Stadium; Attendance: 2765; Referee: P Walton

16 October 1999 12	Rochdale	0–0	Plymouth Argyle	Rochdale
	Hill (yellow card)	Report	Beswetherick (yellow card)	Stadium: Spotland Stadium; Attendance: 3105; Referee: Phil Joslin

19 October 1999 13	Rochdale	0–1	Macclesfield Town	Rochdale
	Hill (yellow card); Holt (yellow card)	Report	Askey 5'; Sedgemore (yellow card)	Stadium: Spotland Stadium; Attendance: 2397; Referee: S J Baines

22 October 1999 14	Swansea City	1–0	Rochdale	Swansea
	Cusack 86'; Jones (yellow card); Thomas (yellow card); Roberts (yellow card); Watkin (yellow card)	Report	Searle (yellow card); Green (yellow card); Jones (yellow card)	Stadium: Vetch Field; Attendance: 4843; Referee: Trevor Parkes

2 November 1999 15	Rochdale	0–2	Hull City	Rochdale
		Report	Harper 8'; Whitmore 90'	Stadium: Spotland Stadium; Attendance: 2365; Referee: R Olivier

6 November 1999 16	Torquay United	1–0	Rochdale	Torquay
	Bedeau 69'; Russell (yellow card)	Report	Monington (yellow card); Searle (yellow card); Flitcroft (yellow card)	Stadium: Plainmoor; Attendance: 2351; Referee: Phil Dowd

14 November 1999 17	Rochdale	2–1	Mansfield Town	Rochdale
	Platt 62'; Ellis 64'	Report	Greenacre 52'; Andrews (yellow card)	Stadium: Spotland Stadium; Attendance: 2709; Referee: M J Brandwood

23 November 1999 18	Leyton Orient	0–0	Rochdale	London
	Clark (yellow card)	Report		Stadium: Brisbane Road; Attendance: 2990; Referee: G Stretton

27 November 1999 19	Lincoln City	1–1	Rochdale	Lincoln
	Gain 48'	Report	Jones 66'; Searle (yellow card)	Stadium: Sincil Bank; Attendance: 3424; Referee: C R Wilkes

4 December 1999 20	Rochdale	0–0	Cheltenham Town	Rochdale
		Report	Howells (yellow card); Banks (yellow card)	Stadium: Spotland Stadium; Attendance: 2245; Referee: U D Rennie

10 December 1999 21	Brighton & Hove Albion	3–4	Rochdale	Brighton
	Aspinall 39'; Cullip 45'; Hart 57'	Report	Bayliss 1'; Atkinson 31'; Platt 82', 89'; Ellis (yellow card)	Stadium: Withdean Stadium; Attendance: 5049; Referee: P Rejer

26 December 1999 22	Carlisle United	1–2	Rochdale	Carlisle
	Durnin 16'; Brightwell (yellow card)	Report	Ellis 58' (yellow card); Flitcroft 62'; Bayliss (yellow card)	Stadium: Brunton Park; Attendance: 3812; Referee: R D Furnandiz

28 December 1999 23	Rochdale	2–1	Shrewsbury Town	Rochdale
	Lancashire 11'; Peake 59'	Report	Murray 76'; Tretton (yellow card)	Stadium: Spotland Stadium; Attendance: 2924; Referee: M Cowburn

3 January 2000 24	Hartlepool United	3–2	Rochdale	Hartlepool
	Miller 5' (pen.); Jones 48'; Clark 56'	Report	Westwood 17' (o.g.); Ellis 65'; Atkinson (yellow card); Flitcroft (yellow card)	Stadium: Victoria Park; Attendance: 4498; Referee: Mike Jones

8 January 2000 25	Rochdale	1–0	Brighton & Hove Albion	Rochdale
	Lancashire 17'	Report		Stadium: Spotland Stadium; Attendance: 2596; Referee: D Pugh

15 January 2000 26	Southend United	3–3	Rochdale	Southend
	Houghton 55'; Carruthers 62' (pen.); Roget 85' (yellow card); Beard (yellow card); Maher (yellow card)	Report	Jones 32'; Lancashire 37', 39'	Stadium: Roots Hall; Attendance: 3190; Referee: B Knight

22 January 2000 27	Rochdale	2–1	York City	Rochdale
	Lancashire 59' (yellow card); Ellis 66'; Hill (yellow card)	Report	Jones 32'; Conlon (yellow card)	Stadium: Spotland Stadium; Attendance: 2580; Referee: Keith Hill

29 January 2000 28	Exeter City	2–0	Rochdale	Exeter
	Brown 27'; Rowbotham 41'	Report	Bayliss (yellow card); Lancashire (yellow card)	Stadium: St James Park; Attendance: 2525; Referee: A R Hall

5 February 2000 29	Rochdale	2–1	Chester City	Rochdale
	Lancashire 9'; Bayliss 89'	Report	Beckett 82'; Robinson (yellow card); Hemmings (yellow card)	Stadium: Spotland Stadium; Attendance: 3093; Referee: Paul Robinson

12 February 2000 30	Halifax Town	0–2	Rochdale	Halifax
		Report	Lancashire 30'; Peake 72'; Jones (yellow card)	Stadium: The Shay; Attendance: 3504; Referee: D Pugh

19 February 2000 31	Rochdale	1–1	Lincoln City	Rochdale
	Bayliss 32'; Ellis (yellow card)	Report	Gordon 79'; Smith (yellow card)	Stadium: Spotland Stadium; Attendance: 3166; Referee: Phil Dowd

26 February 2000 32	Rochdale	0–1	Rotherham United	Rochdale
	Hill (yellow card); Morris (yellow card)	Report	White 58'	Stadium: Spotland Stadium; Attendance: 4131; Referee: D Laws

4 March 2000 33	Darlington	4–1	Rochdale	Darlington
	Duffield 2', 72'; Wainwright 20'; Gabbiadini 45'	Report	Ellis 24'	Stadium: Feethams; Attendance: 5333; Referee: P S Danson

11 March 2000 34	Hull City	2–2	Rochdale	Hull
	Wood 25', 81'; Goodison (red card) 59'; Greaves (yellow card)	Report	Jones 59' (pen.), 90'; Bayliss (yellow card)	Stadium: Boothferry Park; Attendance: 4219; Referee: Richard Beeby

18 March 2000 35	Rochdale	1–4	Leyton Orient	Rochdale
	Ellis 68'; Hill (yellow card)	Report	Christie 5', 59'; Smith 28'; Lockwood 74'	Stadium: Spotland Stadium; Attendance: 2472; Referee: G B Frankland

25 March 2000 36	Rochdale	3–2	Carlisle United	Rochdale
	Monington 8', 45'; Ellis 60'	Report	Soley 14' (pen.), 71' (pen.); Hopper (yellow card); Halliday (yellow card)	Stadium: Spotland Stadium; Attendance: 2417; Referee: Scott Mathieson

28 March 2000 37	Mansfield Town	0–0	Rochdale	Mansfield
	Linighan (yellow card)	Report		Stadium: Field Mill; Attendance: 2257; Referee: M Warren

1 April 2000 38	Peterborough United	3–3	Rochdale	Peterborough
	Clarke 17'; Rea 68'; Lee 82'; Castle (yellow card)	Report	Ford 47'; Ellis 58'; Peake 72'; Bayliss (yellow card); Lancashire (yellow card)	Stadium: London Road Stadium; Attendance: 5587; Referee: K M Lynch

5 April 2000 39	Rochdale	1–1	Torquay United	Rochdale
	Jones 55' (yellow card)	Report	Hill 65'; Healy (yellow card)	Stadium: Spotland Stadium; Attendance: 1529; Referee: Mike Pike

8 April 2000 40	Rochdale	2–0	Hartlepool United	Rochdale
	Peake 14'; Platt 55'; Hill (yellow card); Jones (yellow card)	Report	Strodder (red card) 54'	Stadium: Spotland Stadium; Attendance: 2332; Referee: R Olivier

15 April 2000 41	Shrewsbury Town	2–4	Rochdale	Shrewsbury
	Brown 32', 79'; Davidson (yellow card); Peer (yellow card)	Report	Platt 7'; Peake 15'; Atkinson 48' (pen.); Ellis 81'	Stadium: Gay Meadow; Attendance: 4158; Referee: Chris Foy

18 April 2000 42	Rochdale	1–2	Peterborough United	Rochdale
	Jones 13' (pen.); Flitcroft (yellow card)	Report	Castle 8', 40' (pen.); Cullen (yellow card)	Stadium: Spotland Stadium; Attendance: 2816; Referee: T Jones

22 April 2000 43	Plymouth Argyle	1–1	Rochdale	Plymouth
	McGregor 64' (red card) 85'	Report	Jones (red card) 85'; Ellis 90'; Hill (yellow card); McClare (yellow card)	Stadium: Home Park; Attendance: 6205; Referee: M Fletcher

24 April 2000 44	Rochdale	0–3	Northampton Town	Rochdale
	Evans (yellow card); Bayliss (yellow card); Platt (yellow card)	Report	Howard 2'; Hunt 40'; Corazzin 83'	Stadium: Spotland Stadium; Attendance: 2891; Referee: Michael Ryan

29 April 2000 45	Macclesfield Town	1–2	Rochdale	Macclesfield
	Tomlinson 23'; Martin (red card) 67'; Rioch (yellow card)	Report	Flitcroft 27'; Evans 39'	Stadium: Moss Rose; Attendance: 2202; Referee: Alan Kaye

6 May 2000 46	Rochdale	1–1	Barnet	Rochdale
	Ellis 83'	Report	Arber 67'	Stadium: Spotland Stadium; Attendance: 2347; Referee: G Cain

=== FA Cup ===
30 October 1999 1	Burton Albion	0–0	Rochdale	Burton
		Report	Flitcroft (yellow card)	Stadium: Eton Park; Attendance: 3103; Referee: Mark Halsey

9 November 1999 1 – Replay	Rochdale	3–0	Burton Albion	Rochdale
	Platt 5'; Peake 48'; Dowe 82'	Report	Goodwin (yellow card)	Stadium: Spotland Stadium; Attendance: 2633; Referee: Mark Halsey

20 November 1999 2	Wrexham	2–1	Rochdale	Wrexham
	Roberts 15'; Faulconbridge 88'; Connolly (yellow card)	Report	Atkinson 33'; Bayliss (yellow card)	Stadium: Racecourse Ground; Attendance: 3408; Referee: Trevor Parkes

=== League Cup (Worthington Cup) ===
10 August 1999 1 – 1st Leg	Rochdale	1–2	Chesterfield	Rochdale
	Lancashire 18'; Bayliss (yellow card); Flitcroft (yellow card)	Report	Reeves 47'; Hill 49' (o.g.); Breckin (yellow card)	Stadium: Spotland Stadium; Attendance: 1910; Referee: J A Kirkby

24 August 1999 1 – 2nd Leg	Chesterfield	2–1	Rochdale	Chesterfield
	Bayliss 4' (o.g.); Ebdon 78'; Breckin (yellow card); Reeves (yellow card)	Report	Evans 39'; Atkinson (yellow card); Lancashire (yellow card)	Stadium: Recreation Ground; Attendance: 2067; Referee: N S Barry

=== League Trophy (Auto Windscreens Shield) ===
11 January 2000 2	Rochdale	3–2	Macclesfield Town	Rochdale
	Monington 57', 82'; Lancashire 106'	Report	Davies 10'; Barker 14'; Rioch (yellow card)	Stadium: Spotland Stadium; Attendance: 1112; Referee: Anthony Bates

25 January 2000 QF	Rochdale	0–0 (a.e.t.) (5–4 p)	Hull City	Rochdale
	Bayliss (yellow card); Atkinson (yellow card); Flitcroft (yellow card)	Report	Whitney (yellow card); Whittle (yellow card); Harper (yellow card)	Stadium: Spotland Stadium; Attendance: 1745; Referee: J A Kirkby

7 March 2000 SF	Carlisle United	0–1	Rochdale	Carlisle
	Dobie (yellow card)	Report	Hill 56'; Platt (yellow card)	Stadium: Brunton Park; Attendance: 1792; Referee: Mike Jones

14 March 2000 F – 1st Leg	Rochdale	1–3	Stoke City	Rochdale
	Holt 86'	Report	Hansson 4'; Thorne 21', 27'	Stadium: Spotland Stadium; Attendance: 4241; Referee: A N Butler

22 March 2000 F – 2nd Leg	Stoke City	1–0	Rochdale	Stoke
	Thorne 86'; Mohan (yellow card); O'Connor (yellow card)	Report	Monington (yellow card)	Stadium: Britannia Stadium; Attendance: 16896; Referee: P R Richards
