= 1996–97 Preston North End F.C. season =

English football club season

Preston North End
1996–97 season
- Chairman: Bryan Gray
- Manager: Gary Peters
- Stadium: Deepdale
- Second Division: 15th
- FA Cup: Second round
- League Cup: Second round
- Football League Trophy: Second round
- Top goalscorer: League: Reeves (11); All: Reeves (14)
- Highest home attendance: 14,626 vs Blackpool
- Lowest home attendance: 7,004 vs Luton Town
- Average home league attendance: 9,411

During the 1996–97 English football season, Preston North End F.C. competed in the Football League Second Division.

== Season summary ==
In the 1996–97 season, Preston manager Peters kept faith with the majority of his promotion winning outfit from last season, reinforcing his squad at various stages of the season with players who would be crucial to the club's success in subsequent campaigns. Mark Rankine joined from Wolves, Sean Gregan from Darlington for £350,000 and Michael Jackson from Bury. Slowly the team that had got Preston promoted were moved on, as the club looked to build for the future.

== Final league table ==
Pos	Team	Pld	W	D	L	GF	GA	GD	Pts
13	Watford	46	16	19	11	45	38	+7	67
14	Millwall	46	16	13	17	50	55	−5	61
15	Preston North End	46	18	7	21	49	55	−6	61
16	Bournemouth	46	15	15	16	43	45	−2	60
17	Bristol Rovers	46	15	11	20	47	50	−3	56

Rules for classification: In the Football League goals scored (GF) takes precedence over goal difference (GD).

== Results ==
Preston North End's score comes first

=== Legend ===
Win	Draw	Loss

=== Football League Second Division ===
Date	Opponent	Venue	Result	Attendance	Scorers
17 August 1996	Notts County	A	1–2	6,879	Bryson
24 August 1996	Bristol Rovers	H	0–0	9,752	
27 August 1996	Crewe Alexandra	H	2–1	9,498	Wilkinson (2)
30 August 1996	Plymouth Argyle	A	1–2	9,209	Wilkinson
7 September 1996	Bristol City	A	1–2	8,016	Kilbane
10 September 1996	York City	H	1–0	6,276	Ashcroft
14 September 1996	Bournemouth	H	0–1	8,268	
21 September 1996	Wrexham	A	0–1	5,299	
28 September 1996	Millwall	H	2–1	9,400	Holt, Saville
1 October 1996	Watford	A	0–1	6,434	
5 October 1996	Peterborough United	H	3–4	8,874	Ashcroft (2), Holt
12 October 1996	Stockport County	A	0–1	8,405	
15 October 1996	Walsall	A	0–1	3,224	
19 October 1996	Shrewsbury Town	H	2–1	8,333	Seabury (own goal), Reeves
26 October 1996	Gillingham	A	1–1	6,256	Kilbane
29 October 1996	Burnley	H	1–1	12,652	Reeves
2 November 1996	Rotherham United	H	0–0	8,997	
9 November 1996	Chesterfield	A	1–2	4,759	Reeves
19 November 1996	Luton Town	H	3–2	7,004	Moyes (2), Ashcroft
23 November 1996	Wycombe Wanderers	A	1–0	4,920	Ashcroft (pen)
30 November 1996	Gillingham	H	1–0	9,616	Davey
3 December 1996	Bury	A	0–3	5,447	
13 December 1996	Blackpool	H	3–0	14,626	Bennett (2), Reeves
21 December 1996	Brentford	A	0–0	5,365	
28 December 1996	Bristol City	H	0–2	10,905	
11 January 1997	Millwall	A	2–3	7,096	Davey (2, 1 pen)
18 January 1997	Watford	H	1–1	8,735	Bennett
25 January 1997	Burnley	A	2–1	16,186	Ashcroft (2)
1 February 1997	Chesterfield	H	0–1	8,681	
8 February 1997	Rotherham United	A	1–0	3,556	Reeves
11 February 1997	Bournemouth	A	0–2	4,769	
15 February 1997	Wycombe Wanderers	H	2–1	7,923	McKenna, Davey
22 February 1997	Luton Town	A	1–5	6,454	Reeves
25 February 1997	York City	A	1–3	2,515	Cartwright
1 March 1997	Bury	H	3–1	8,749	Moyes, Reeves, Stallard
8 March 1997	Brentford	H	1–0	9,489	Bryson
15 March 1997	Blackpool	A	1–2	8,017	Davey
18 March 1997	Wrexham	H	2–1	8,271	Reeves, Ashcroft
23 March 1997	Bristol Rovers	A	0–1	6,405	
29 March 1997	Notts County	H	2–0	9,472	Reeves, Moyes
31 March 1997	Crewe Alexandra	A	0–1	4,407	
5 April 1997	Plymouth Argyle	H	1–1	8,503	Reeves
12 April 1997	Peterborough United	A	0–2	5,040	
19 April 1997	Stockport County	H	1–0	10,298	Bryson
26 April 1997	Shrewsbury Town	A	2–0	5,341	Gregan, Davey
3 May 1997	Walsall	H	2–0	10,800	Holt, Reeves

=== FA Cup ===
Round	Date	Opponent	Venue	Result	Attendance	Goalscorers
R1	16 November 1996	Altrincham	H	4–1	8,286	Reeves (3), Ashcroft
R2	7 December 1996	York City	H	2–3	7,893	Ashcroft (2, 1 pen)

=== League Cup ===
Round	Date	Opponent	Venue	Result	Attendance	Goalscorers
R1 1st Leg	20 August 1996	Wigan Athletic	A	3–2	3,713	Wilkinson (3)
R1 2nd Leg	3 September 1996	Wigan Athletic	H	4–4 (won 7–6 on agg)	5,767	Davey, Wilkinson, Atkinson, McDonald
R2 1st Leg	17 September 1996	Tottenham Hotspur	H	1–1	16,258	Holt
R2 2nd Leg	25 September 1996	Tottenham Hotspur	A	0–3 (lost 1–4 on agg)	20,080	

=== Football League Trophy ===
Round	Date	Opponent	Venue	Result	Attendance	Goalscorers
NR1	9 December 1996	Chesterfield	A	2–0	1,169	Atkinson, Bennett
NR2	21 January 1997	York City	A	0–1	1,428	

== Statistics ==
=== Appearances and goals ===
No.	Pos	Nat	Player	Total		Division Two		FA Cup		EFL Cup		EFL Trophy	
No.	Pos	Nat	Player	Apps	Goals	Apps	Goals	Apps	Goals	Apps	Goals	Apps	Goals
	GK	(England) ENG	Bobby Mimms	31	0	27	0	2	0	2	0	0	0
	FW	(England) ENG	Darren Beckford	3	0	0 + 2	0	0	0	0	0	1	0
	FW	(England) ENG	Dave Reeves	37	14	33 + 1	11	2	3	0	0	1	0
	DF	(Scotland) SCO	David Moyes	30	4	26	4	2	0	1	0	0 + 1	0
	DF	(England) ENG	Dean Barrick	41	0	30 + 6	0	0	0	4	0	1	0
	FW	(England) ENG	Gary Bennett	17	4	10 + 6	3	0	0	0	0	1	1
	MF	(England) ENG	Graeme Atkinson	23	2	12 + 5	0	0 + 1	0	3	1	2	1
	MF	(Scotland) SCO	Ian Bryson	48	3	32 + 9	3	1 + 1	0	3	0	2	0
	DF	(England) ENG	Jamie Squires	13	0	6 + 3	0	0 + 1	0	1	0	2	0
	DF	(England) ENG	John Kay	10	0	7	0	0	0	3	0	0	0
	GK	(Republic of Ireland) IRL	Kelham O'Hanlon	15	0	13	0	0	0	0	0	2	0
	MF	(England) ENG	Kevin Gage	17	0	16	0	1	0	0	0	0	0
	MF	(Republic of Ireland) IRL	Kevin Kilbane	41	2	32 + 4	2	1	0	4	0	0	0
	FW	(Wales) WAL	Kurt Nogan	7	0	5 + 2	0	0	0	0	0	0	0
	FW	(England) ENG	Lee Ashcroft	30	11	26 + 1	8	2	3	0	0	0 + 1	0
	MF	(England) ENG	Lee Cartwright	15	1	14	1	0	0	0	0	1	0
	MF	(England) ENG	Mark Rankine	26	0	19 + 3	0	2	0	2	0	0	0
	FW	(England) ENG	Michael Holt	23	4	8 + 11	3	1 + 1	0	2	1	0	0
	DF	(England) ENG	Michael Jackson	7	0	7	0	0	0	0	0	0	0
	FW	(England) ENG	Mickey Brown	7	0	5 + 1	0	0	0	0 + 1	0	0	0
	MF	(England) ENG	Neil McDonald	27	1	12 + 11	0	2	0	0 + 2	1	0	0
	MF	(England) ENG	Paul McKenna	7	1	4 + 1	1	0	0	0	0	2	0
	DF	(England) ENG	Paul Sparrow	8	0	6	0	1	0	0	0	1	0
	DF	(England) ENG	Russ Wilcox	42	0	35	0	2	0	4	0	1	0
	DF	(England) ENG	Ryan Kidd	42	0	33 + 2	0	2	0	3 + 1	0	1	0
	DF	(England) ENG	Sean Gregan	22	1	21	1	0	0	0	0	1	0
	MF	(Wales) WAL	Simon Davey	44	7	30 + 7	6	0 + 1	0	4	1	2	0
	FW	(England) ENG	Steve Wilkinson	14	7	8 + 2	3	1	0	2	4	1	0
	GK	(Finland) FIN	Teuvo Moilanen	5	0	4	0	0	0	1	0	0	0
Player(s) who featured whilst on loan but returned to parent club during the season:
	DF	(Northern Ireland) NIR	Darren Patterson	2	0	2	0	0	0	0	0	0	0
	FW	(England) ENG	Mark Stallard	4	1	4	1	0	0	0	0	0	0
	DF	(England) ENG	Shaun Teale	5	0	5	0	0	0	0	0	0	0
Player(s) who left during the season:
	FW	(England) ENG	Andy Saville	16	1	12	1	0	0	4	0	0	0
	DF	(England) ENG	Ryan Kirby	0	0	0	0	0	0	0	0	0	0
Player(s) out on loan:
	GK	(England) ENG	David Lucas	3	0	2	0	0	0	1	0	0	0

== Awards and Nominations ==
=== Club Awards ===
Award	Player	Notes	Ref.
Player of the Year	(England) Sean Gregan		
