= 1995–96 Preston North End F.C. season =

Preston North End's 1995-1996 season

Preston North End
1995–96 season
- Chairman: Bryan Gray
- Manager: Gary Peters
- Stadium: Deepdale
- Third Division: 1st
- FA Cup: Second round
- League Cup: First round
- Football League Trophy: Second round
- Top goalscorer: League: Saville (29); All: Saville(29)
- Highest home attendance: 18,700 vs Exeter City
- Lowest home attendance: 6,837 vs Wigan Athletic
- Average home league attendance: 9,411

During the 1995–96 English football season, Preston North End F.C. competed in the Football League Third Division.

== Season summary ==
During the summer of 1995, with extra funds made available, Gary Peters brought in strikers Andy Saville and Steve Wilkinson. Russ Wilcox and Dean Barrick were also brought in to strengthen the defense.

Preston North End started the season with a loss at home against Lincoln City, however, they followed this up with a 21-match unbeaten run. Preston didn't lose again in the league until the 6th January. Preston sealed promotion with a 2-0 victory against Leyton Orient on 20th April and clinched the Championship a week later against Hartlepool United.

Not only were Preston champions, they were the highest scoring outfit in the division with 78 goals. Andy Saville was the Divisions joint top scorer.

There were important changes off the pitch too as the West Stand had been demolished over the summer and replaced with the 8,000 seater Sir Tom Finney Stand, which opened on 16th March.

== Final league table ==
Pos	Team	Pld	W	D	L	GF	GA	GD	Pts	Promotion
1	Preston North End (C, P)	46	23	17	6	78	38	+40	86	Promotion to the Second Division
2	Gillingham (P)	46	22	17	7	49	20	+29	83	Promotion to the Second Division
3	Bury (P)	46	22	13	11	66	48	+18	79	Promotion to the Second Division
4	Plymouth Argyle (O, P)	46	22	12	12	68	49	+19	78	Qualification for the Third Division play-offs
5	Darlington	46	20	18	8	60	42	+18	78	Qualification for the Third Division play-offs

(C) Champions; (O) Play-off winners; (P) Promoted

== Results ==
Preston North End's score comes first

=== Legend ===
Win	Draw	Loss

=== Football League Third Division ===
Date	Opponent	Venue	Result	Attendance	Scorers
12 August 1995	Lincoln City	H	1-2	7,813	Saville
19 August 1995	Plymouth Argyle	A	2-0	6,862	Hammond (og), Bryson
26 August 1995	Wigan Athletic	H	1-1	6,837	Atkinson
29 August 1995	Bury	A	0-0	4,682	
02 September 1995	Cambridge United	H	3-3	7,034	Saville, Wilkinson, Lancashire
09 September 1995	Hereford United	A	1-0	3,124	Saville
12 September 1995	Colchester United	A	2-2	2,869	Cartwright, Bryson
16 September 1995	Scunthorpe United	H	2-2	7,397	Atkinson, Bryson
23 September 1995	Fulham	A	2-2	5,209	Bryson, Davey
30 September 1995	Chester City	H	2-0	8,544	Wilkinson, Saville
07 October 1995	Scarborough	H	3-2	7,702	Saville, Wilkinson, Davey
14 October 1995	Torquay United	A	4-0	4,058	Bryson(2), Saville(2)
21 October 1995	Mansfield Town	H	6-0	8,981	Wilkinson(3), Saville(3)
28 October 1995	Doncaster Rovers	A	2-2	4,413	Davey(2)
31 October 1995	Northampton Town	A	2-1	4,695	Wilcox, Saville
04 November 1995	Leyton Orient	H	4-0	9,823	Saville(3), Davey
18 November 1995	Exeter City	A	1-1	3,350	Moyes
25 November 1995	Hartlepool United	H	3-0	9,449	Moyes, Atkinson, Saville
09 December 1995	Fulham	H	1-1	8,422	Bryson
16 December 1995	Chester City	A	1-1	5,004	Wilkinson
23 December 1995	Gillingham	H	0-0	10,669	
01 January 1996	Cardiff City	H	5-0	8,354	Davey, Brown, Saville(2), Atkinson
06 January 1996	Barnet	A	0-1	2,737	
13 January 1996	Plymouth Argyle	H	3-2	11,126	Bryson, Davey, Cartwright
20 January 1996	Lincoln City	A	0-0	5,185	
30 January 1996	Darlington	A	2-1	2,599	Cartwright, Saville
03 February 1996	Wigan Athletic	A	1-0	5,567	Kilbane
10 February 1996	Barnet	H	0-1	9,974	
17 February 1996	Colchester United	H	2-0	9,335	Saville(2)
24 February 1996	Scunthorpe United	A	2-1	3,638	Saville, Lancashire
27 February 1996	Hereford United	H	2-2	9,761	Atkinson, Saville
02 March 1996	Rochdale	H	1-2	9,697	Saville
09 March 1996	Gillingham	A	1-1	10,602	Davey
12 March 1996	Rochdale	A	3-0	4,597	Birch, Wilkinson, Moyes
16 March 1996	Darlington	H	1-1	12,070	Bryson
23 March 1996	Cardiff City	A	1-0	3,511	Saville
26 March 1996	Bury	H	0-0	12,260	
30 March 1996	Scarborough	A	2-1	3,771	Davey, Bennett
02 April 1996	Torquay United	H	1-0	11,965	Wilkinson
06 April 1996	Doncaster Rovers	H	1-0	12,773	Birch
08 April 1996	Mansfield Town	A	0-0	4,661	
13 April 1996	Northampton Town	H	0-3	11,774	
16 April 1996	Cambridge United	A	1-2	2,831	Saville
20 April 1996	Leyton Orient	A	2-0	5,170	Saville(2)
27 April 1996	Hartlepool United	A	2-0	5,076	Davey, Saville
04 May 1996	Exeter City	H	2-0	18,700	Saville, Wilkinson

=== FA Cup ===
Round	Date	Opponent	Venue	Result	Attendance	Goalscorers
R1	11 November 1995	Carlisle United	A	2-1	7,046	Cartwright, Wilcox
R2	02 December 1995	Bradford City	A	1-2	7,602	Wilkinson

=== League Cup ===
Round	Date	Opponent	Venue	Result	Attendance	Goalscorers
R1 1st Leg	15 August 1995	Sunderland	H	1-1	6,323	Kidd
R1 2nd Leg	23 August 1995	Sunderland	A	2-3	7,407	Carwright, Bryson

=== Football League Trophy ===
Round	Date	Opponent	Venue	Result	Attendance	Goalscorers
NR1	17 October 1995	Hull City	A	0-1	753	
NR1	07 November 1995	Scarborough	H	2-1	5,639	Atkinson, Kidd
NR1	28 November 1995	Lincoln City	A	1-2	1,729	Saville

== Statistics ==
=== Appearances and goals ===
No.	Pos	Nat	Player	Total		Division Three		FA Cup		EFL Cup		EFL Trophy	
No.	Pos	Nat	Player	Apps	Goals	Apps	Goals	Apps	Goals	Apps	Goals	Apps	Goals
	DF	(England) ENG	Andy Fensome	25	0	20	0	2	0	1	0	2	0
	FW	(England) ENG	Andy Saville	50	30	44	29	2	0	2	0	2	1
	DF	(Scotland) SCO	David Moyes	48	3	41	3	2	0	2	0	3	0
	DF	(England) ENG	Dean Barrick	44	0	39 + 1	0	2	0	0	0	2	0
	FW	(England) ENG	Gary Bennett	8	1	5 + 3	1	0	0	0	0	0	0
	MF	(England) ENG	Graeme Atkinson	51	6	42 + 2	5	2	0	2	0	3	1
	FW	(England) ENG	Graham Lancashire	7	1	2 + 4	1	0	0	0	0	0 + 1	0
	MF	(Scotland) SCO	Ian Bryson	51	10	44	9	2	0	2	1	3	0
	DF	(England) ENG	Jamie Squires	9	1	3 + 4	1	0	0	0	0	1 + 1	0
	GK	(England) ENG	John Vaughan	46	0	40	0	2	0	2	0	2	0
	MF	(England) ENG	Kevin Gage	7	0	4 + 3	0	0	0	0	0	0	0
	MF	(Republic of Ireland) IRL	Kevin Kilbane	13	1	7 + 4	1	0	0	0	0	1 + 1	0
	MF	(England) ENG	Lee Cartwright	32	5	22 + 4	3	1 + 1	1	1	1	1 + 2	0
	FW	(England) ENG	Mickey Brown	11	1	6 + 4	1	0	0	0	0	1	0
	MF	(England) ENG	Neil McDonald	14	0	8 + 3	0	1	0	0	0	2	0
	DF	(England) ENG	Paul Sparrow	13	0	13	0	0	0	0	0	0	0
	DF	(Scotland) SCO	Ray Sharp	4	0	1	0	0	0	2	0	1	0
	DF	(England) ENG	Russ Wilcox	29	2	27	1	1	1	0	0	1	0
	DF	(England) ENG	Ryan Kidd	36	2	23 + 7	0	1	0	2	1	2 + 1	1
	MF	(Wales) WAL	Simon Davey	43	10	37 + 1	10	2	0	0	0	3	0
	DF	(England) ENG	Steve Holmes	8	0	8	0	0	0	0	0	0	0
	FW	(England) ENG	Steve Wilkinson	48	11	36 + 6	10	2	1	2	0	2	0
	GK	(Finland) FIN	Teuvo Moilanen	2	0	2	0	0	0	0	0	0	0
	FW	(Republic of Ireland) IRL	Tony Grant	1	0	0 + 1	0	0	0	0	0	0	0
Player(s) who featured whilst on loan but returned to parent club during the season:
	DF	(England) ENG	Alan Johnson	2	0	2	0	0	0	0	0	0	0
	DF	(England) ENG	Charlie Bishop	4	0	4	0	0	0	0	0	0	0
	MF	(England) ENG	Paul Birch	11	2	11	2	0	0	0	0	0	0
Player(s) who left during the season
	GK	(England) ENG	Barry Richardson	4	0	3	0	0	0	0	0	1	0
	MF	(England) ENG	Gareth Ainsworth	4	0	0 + 2	0	0	0	0 + 2	0	0	0
	MF	(England) ENG	Paul Raynor	4	0	2 + 1	0	0	0	1	0	0	0
	MF	(Scotland) SCO	Kevin Magee	7	0	4 + 1	0	0	0	1 + 1	0	0	0
	MF	(England) ENG	Terry Fleming	8	0	5	0	0	0	2	0	0 + 1	0
Player(s) out on loan:
	FW	(Scotland) SCO	Allan Smart	3	0	0 + 2	0	0	0	0	0	0 + 1	0
	GK	(England) ENG	David Lucas	1	0	1	0	0	0	0	0	0	0

== Awards and Nominations ==
=== Club Awards ===
Award	Player	Notes	Ref.
Player of the Year	(England) Andy Saville		
