= 1997–98 Preston North End F.C. season =

English football club season

Preston North End
1997–98 season
- Chairman: Bryan Gray
- Manager: Gary Peters (until 12 January); David Moyes (from 12 January)
- Stadium: Deepdale
- Second Division: 15th
- FA Cup: Third round
- League Cup: Second round
- Football League Trophy: Area Semi-final
- Top goalscorer: League: Lee Ashcroft (14); All: Lee Ashcroft (16)
- Highest home attendance: 13,500 vs Blackpool
- Lowest home attendance: 6,992 vs Luton Town
- Average home league attendance: 9,460

During the 1997–98 English football season, Preston North End F.C. competed in the Football League Second Division.

== Season summary ==
The summer saw the arrival of three young players from Manchester United, Jonathan Macken, Colin Murdock and Michael Appleton. Preston won three of their first five matches and comfortably beat Rotherham United in the League Cup, although they were on the wrong side of a 6-0 scoreline against Blackburn Rovers the following round.

After a difficult autumn, which saw Preston go on a run of four successive defeats and then later three defeats from four matches, Gary Peters resigned as manager in January. Assistant manager David Moyes took over as caretaker player-manager and didn't see a league win until the end of February. Preston finished their season by losing just two of their final 13 matches, and consequently David Moyes was offered the full time job as manager of Preston North End.

This was something of a transition season for Preston, other than the change in manager, Sean Gregan, Mark Rankine, Gary Parkinson and Tepi Moilanen became regular starters, while Simon Davey, Dean Barrick, David Reeves and David Moyes all played their last game for the club.

== Final league table ==
Pos	Team	Pld	W	D	L	GF	GA	GD	Pts
13	Oldham Athletic	46	15	16	15	62	54	+8	61
14	Wycombe Wanderers	46	14	18	14	51	53	−2	60
15	Preston North End	46	15	14	17	56	56	0	59
16	York City	46	14	17	15	52	58	−6	59
17	Luton Town	46	14	15	17	60	64	−4	57

Rules for classification: In the Football League goals scored (GF) takes precedence over goal difference (GD).

== Results ==
Preston North End's score comes first

=== Legend ===
Win	Draw	Loss

=== Football League Second Division ===
Date	Opponent	Venue	Result	Attendance	Scorers
09 August 1997	Gillingham	A	0-0	6,562	
16 August 1997	Millwall	H	2-1	11,486	Macken, Ashcroft
23 August 1997	Chesterfield	A	2-3	6,288	Rankine, Barrick
30 August 1997	Watford	H	2-0	11,042	Nogan (2)
02 September 1997	Grimsby Town	H	2-0	9,489	Reeves, Ashcroft
09 September 1997	Oldham Athletic	A	0-1	8,732	
13 September 1997	Walsall	H	0-0	9,092	
20 September 1997	Burnley	A	1-1	13,809	Nogan
27 September 1997	Wycombe Wanderers	A	0-0	4,838	
04 October 1997	Brentford	H	2-1	8,804	Ashcroft, Murdock
11 October 1997	AFC Bournemouth	H	0-1	8,531	
17 October 1997	Carlisle United	A	2-0	6,541	Parkinson, Ashcroft
21 October 1997	Bristol City	A	1-2	9,039	Dyche (og)
25 October 1997	Wrexham	H	0-1	9,098	
01 November 1997	Plymouth Argyle	H	0-1	8,405	
04 November 1997	York City	A	0-1	3,370	
08 November 1997	Luton Town	A	3-1	5,767	Lormor, Eyres, Ashcroft
18 November 1997	Bristol Rovers	H	1-2	7,798	Jackson
22 November 1997	Wigan Athletic	A	4-1	5,649	Cartwright (2), Ashcroft, Kidd
29 November 1997	Fulham	H	3-1	9,723	Ashcroft (3)
02 December 1997	Southend United	A	2-3	2,307	Lormor (2)
13 December 1997	Northampton Town	H	1-0	7,448	Macken
20 December 1997	Blackpool	A	1-2	8,342	Holt
26 December 1997	Oldham Athletic	H	1-1	13,441	Holt
28 December 1997	Grimsby Town	A	1-3	6,725	Gregan
10 January 1998	Gillingham	H	1-3	7,776	Gregan
17 January 1998	Watford	A	1-3	10,182	Parkinson
24 January 1998	Chesterfield	H	0-0	8,233	
31 January 1998	Walsall	A	1-1	5,377	Nogan
07 February 1998	Burnley	H	2-3	12,263	Nogan, Jackson
14 February 1998	Brentford	A	0-0	4,952	
21 February 1998	Wycombe Wanderers	H	1-1	7,665	Macken
24 February 1998	Carlisle United	H	0-3	8,985	
28 February 1998	AFC Bournemouth	A	2-0	5,009	Davey, Appleton
03 March 1998	Luton Town	H	1-0	6,992	Kidd
07 March 1998	Plymouth Argyle	A	0-2	4,201	
14 March 1998	York City	H	3-2	7,664	Eyres, Appleton, Parkinson
21 March 1998	Bristol Rovers	A	2-2	5,278	Davey, Ashcroft
25 March 1998	Millwall	A	1-0	5,888	Ashcroft
28 March 1998	Wigan Athletic	H	1-1	10,171	Ashcroft
04 April 1998	Fulham	A	1-2	8,814	Macken
11 April 1998	Southend United	H	1-0	8,096	Parkinson
13 April 1998	Northampton Town	A	2-2	5,664	Ashcroft, Macken
18 April 1998	Blackpool	H	3-3	13,500	Eyres, Parkinson, Macken
25 April 1998	Wrexham	A	0-0	7,302	
02 May 1998	Bristol City	H	2-1	12,067	Ashcroft, Eyres

=== FA Cup ===
Round	Date	Opponent	Venue	Result	Attendance	Goalscorers
R1	15 November 1997	Doncaster Rovers	H	3–2	7,953	Gregan (2), Eyres
R2	06 December 1997	Notts County	H	2–2	7,583	Parkinson, Ashcroft
R2 Replay	12 December 1997	Notts County	A	2–1 (a.e.t)	3,052	Moyes, Eyres
R3	3 January 1998	Stockport County	H	1–2	12,180	Ashcroft

=== League Cup ===
Round	Date	Opponent	Venue	Result	Attendance	Goalscorers
R1 1st Leg	12 August 1997	Rotherham United	A	3-1	2,901	Macken, Reeves
R1 2nd Leg	26 August 1997	Rotherham United	H	2-0	9,441	Reeves, Macken
R2 1st Leg	17 September 1997	Blackburn Rovers	A	0-6	22,564	
R2 2nd Leg	30 September 1997	Blackburn Rovers	H	1-0	11,472	Barrick

=== Football League Trophy ===
Round	Date	Opponent	Venue	Result	Attendance	Goalscorers
R1N	09 December 1997	Darlington	H	3-2	2,703	Appleton, Eyres (2)
R2N	13 January 1998	Macclesfield Town	A	1-0	1,618	Cartwright
RQFN	27 January 1998	Mansfield Town	H	1-0	3,609	Nogan
RSFN	17 February 1998	Burnley	A	0-1	10,079	

== Statistics ==
=== Appearances and goals ===
No.	Pos	Nat	Player	Total		Division Two		FA Cup		EFL Cup		EFL Trophy	
No.	Pos	Nat	Player	Apps	Goals	Apps	Goals	Apps	Goals	Apps	Goals	Apps	Goals
	DF	(Northern Ireland) NIR	Colin Murdock	33	1	27	1	1+1	0	2	0	2	0
	DF	(England) ENG	Dean Barrick	43	2	29+4	1	3	0	3+1	1	3	0
	MF	(England) ENG	David Eyres	35	8	26+2	4	4	2	0	0	3	2
	GK	(England) ENG	David Lucas	7	0	6	0	1	0	0	0	0	0
	DF	(Scotland) SCO	David Moyes	13	1	8+1	0	0+1	1	0	0	3	0
	DF	(England) ENG	Gary Parkinson	57	6	44+1	5	4	1	4	0	4	0
	MF	(England) ENG	Graeme Atkinson	3	0	1+2	0	0	0	0	0	0	0
	FW	(France) FRA	Habib Sissoko	7	0	4+3	0	0	0	0	0	0	0
	FW	(Republic of Ireland) IRL	Jon Macken	39	8	20+9	6	2+1	0	2+2	2	0+3	0
	MF	(England) ENG	Julian Darby	18	0	6+6	0	2+1	0	1+1	0	0+1	0
	FW	(Wales) WAL	Kurt Nogan	28	6	14+8	5	0+1	0	1+1	0	3	1
	FW	(England) ENG	Lee Ashcroft	46	16	37	14	3	2	4	0	2	0
	MF	(England) ENG	Lee Cartwright	44	3	24+12	2	0+1	0	3+1	0	3	1
	MF	(England) ENG	Mark Rankine	43	1	34+1	1	2	0	4	0	2	0
	MF	(England) ENG	Michael Appleton	47	4	31+7	2	4	1	2+1	0	2	1
	FW	(England) ENG	Michael Holt	18	2	4+10	2	0+2	0	0+1	0	0+1	0
	DF	(England) ENG	Michael Jackson	52	1	39+1	1	4	0	4	0	4	0
	MF	(England) ENG	Paul McKenna	5	0	4+1	0	0	0	0	0	0	0
	DF	(Northern Ireland) NIR	Paul Sparrow	1	0	1	0	0	0	0	0	0	0
	DF	(England) ENG	Ryan Kidd	44	2	32+1	2	4	0	4	0	3	0
	DF	(England) ENG	Sean Gregan	45	3	33+2	2	4	1	3	0	3	0
	MF	(Wales) WAL	Simon Davey	20	2	17+1	2	0	0	0	0	2	0
	GK	(Finland) FIN	Teuvo Moilanen	48	0	40	0	3	0	4	0	1	0
	FW	(England) ENG	Tony Lormor	18	3	9+3	3	3	0	0	0	3	0
Player(s) who featured whilst on loan but returned to parent club during the season:
	MF	(England) ENG	John Mullin	8	0	4+3	0	0	0	0	0	1	0
Player(s) who left during the season:
	FW	(England) ENG	David Reeves	17	4	12+1	1	0	0	3 + 1	3	0	0
Out on loan:
	DF	(England) ENG	Jamie Squires	0	0	0	0	0	0	0	0	0	0
	DF	(Northern Ireland) NIR	Paul Morgan	0	0	0	0	0	0	0	0	0	0

== Awards and Nominations ==
=== Club Awards ===
Award	Player	Notes	Ref.
Player of the Year	(Finland) Teuvo Moilanen		
