= 1999–2000 Grimsby Town F.C. season =

Grimsby Town
1999–2000 season
- Chairman: Bill Carr
- Manager: Alan Buckley
- Stadium: Blundell Park
- First Division: 20th
- FA Cup: Fourth round
- League Cup: Third round
- Top goalscorer: League: Ashcroft (12); All: Ashcroft (13)
- Average home league attendance: 6,157

During the 1999–2000 English football season, Grimsby Town F.C. competed in the Football League First Division.

== Season summary ==
After a brilliant first full season back in the second tier finishing 11th, Grimsby a season later really struggled and finished the 1999–2000 season in 20th, avoiding relegation at the expense of Buckley's former club Walsall.

== Transfers ==
=== Transfers in ===
Date	Pos	Player	Transferred from	Fee	Ref
9 July 1999	FW	(England) Bradley Allen	(England) Charlton Athletic	Free Transfer	
10 July 1999	GK	(Wales) Danny Coyne	(England) Tranmere Rovers	Free Transfer	
9 September 1999	MF	(England) Alan Pouton	(England) York City	£150,000	
1 August 1999	MF	(England) Matt McKenzie	(England) Dunkirk	Free Transfer	

=== Loans in ===
Date	Pos	Player	Transferred from	Date Until	Ref
5 August 1999	MF	(England) Alan Pouton	(England) York City	8 September 1999	
4 November 1999	MF	(England) Ian Hamilton	(England) Sheffield United	4 December 1999	
24 February 2000	FW	(England) Mark Nicholls	(England) Chelsea	28 March 2000	

=== Transfers out ===
Date	Pos	Player	Transferred To	Fee	Ref
18 June 1999	MF	(England) Tommy Widdrington	(England) Port Vale	Free Transfer	
1 July 1999	MF	(Scotland) Jim Dobbin	(England) Gainsborough Trinity	Released	
13 July 1999	FW	(Wales) Lee Nogan	(England) Darlington	Released	
6 August 1999	GK	(Northern Ireland) Aidan Davison	(England) Sheffield United	Free Transfer	
28 January 2000	FW	(England) Jack Lester	(England) Nottingham Forest	£300,000	

=== Loans out ===
Date	Pos	Player	Transferred To	Date Until	Ref
1 August 1999	GK	(England) Andy Love	(England) Ilkeston Town	1 October 1999	
10 November 1999	FW	(Republic of Ireland) Daryl Clare	(England) Northampton Town	29 January 2000	
19 February 2000	GK	(England) Andy Love	(England) Ilkeston Town	8 May 2000	

== Final league table ==
Pos	Team	Pld	W	D	L	GF	GA	GD	Pts	Qualification or relegation
18	Portsmouth	46	13	12	21	55	66	−11	51	
19	Crewe Alexandra	46	14	9	23	46	67	−21	51	
20	Grimsby Town	46	13	12	21	41	67	−26	51	
21	West Bromwich Albion	46	10	19	17	43	60	−17	49	
22	Walsall (R)	46	11	13	22	52	77	−25	46	Relegation to the Second Division

Rules for classification: 1) Points; 2) Goal difference; 3) Goals scored
(R) Relegated

== Results ==
Grimsby Town's score comes first

=== Legend ===
Win	Draw	Loss

=== Football League First Division ===
Date	Opponent	Venue	Result	Attendance	Scorers
7 August 1999	Stockport County	H	0–1	5,528	
14 August 1999	Nottingham Forest	A	1–2	17,121	Groves (pen)
21 August 1999	Fulham	H	1–1	6,196	Black
27 August 1999	Crewe Alexandra	A	1–1	5,440	Lester
30 August 1999	Swindon Town	H	1–0	5,705	Groves (pen)
5 September 1999	Port Vale	A	1–3	3,737	Allen
11 September 1999	Walsall	H	1–0	6,014	Allen
18 September 1999	Crystal Palace	A	0–3	13,294	
25 September 1999	Portsmouth	A	2–1	12,073	Ashcroft, Coldicott
2 October 1999	Ipswich Town	H	2–1	6,531	Donovan, Ashcroft
16 October 1999	Blackburn Rovers	A	1–1	17,575	Ashcroft (pen)
19 October 1999	Tranmere Rovers	A	2–3	5,004	Allen (2)
23 October 1999	Birmingham City	H	1–1	6,266	Allen
26 October 1999	Portsmouth	H	1–0	5,912	Awford (own goal)
30 October 1999	Ipswich Town	A	0–2	16,617	
6 November 1999	Wolverhampton Wanderers	A	0–3	19,036	
12 November 1999	Charlton Athletic	H	2–5	6,849	Ashcroft (pen), Donovan
20 November 1999	Bolton Wanderers	A	0–2	12,415	
23 November 1999	Queens Park Rangers	H	2–1	4,297	Ashcroft (2 pens)
28 November 1999	Norwich City	H	2–1	5,333	Ashcroft (2, 1 pen)
4 December 1999	Stockport County	A	1–2	5,581	Hamilton
14 December 1999	West Bromwich Albion	H	1–1	4,036	Allen
18 December 1999	Huddersfield Town	A	1–3	14,065	Groves
26 December 1999	Barnsley	H	0–3	8,742	
28 December 1999	Manchester City	A	1–2	32,607	Coldicott
3 January 2000	Sheffield United	H	2–2	7,618	Lester, Ashcroft
15 January 2000	Nottingham Forest	H	4–3	6,738	Lester, Ashcroft (2, 1 pen), Donovan
22 January 2000	Fulham	A	1–0	10,802	Lester
29 January 2000	Crewe Alexandra	H	1–1	6,147	Allen
5 February 2000	Swindon Town	A	1–0	5,784	Ashcroft
12 February 2000	Port Vale	H	2–0	6,265	Clare, Allen
19 February 2000	Norwich City	A	0–3	13,533	
26 February 2000	Crystal Palace	H	1–0	5,421	D Smith (pen)
4 March 2000	Walsall	A	0–1	5,384	
7 March 2000	Wolverhampton Wanderers	H	1–0	5,575	Clare
11 March 2000	Queens Park Rangers	A	0–1	10,450	
18 March 2000	Bolton Wanderers	H	0–1	5,289	
22 March 2000	Charlton Athletic	A	0–4	19,364	
27 March 2000	Barnsley	A	0–3	14,613	
1 April 2000	Huddersfield Town	H	0–0	6,993	
8 April 2000	Sheffield United	A	0–0	11,612	
15 April 2000	Manchester City	H	1–1	8,166	Pouton
22 April 2000	Blackburn Rovers	H	0–0	6,558	
24 April 2000	West Bromwich Albion	A	1–2	15,291	Black
29 April 2000	Tranmere Rovers	H	1–2	5,427	Clare
7 May 2000	Birmingham City	A	0–0	25,263	

=== FA Cup ===
Round	Date	Opponent	Venue	Result	Attendance	Goalscorers
Third round	10 December 1999	Stockport County	H	3–2	3,400	Livingstone (2), Allen
Fourth round	8 January 2000	Bolton Wanderers	H	0–2	4,270	

=== League Cup ===
Round	Date	Opponent	Venue	Result	Attendance	Goalscorers
First round first leg	10 August 1999	Carlisle United	A	0–0	3,000	
First round second leg	24 August 1999	Carlisle United	H	6–0 (won 6–0 on agg)	2,696	Lester (3), Groves, Coldicott, Donovan
Second round first leg	14 September 1999	Leyton Orient	H	4–1	2,238	D Smith, Gallimore, Ashcroft (pen), Groves
Second round second leg	21 September 1999	Leyton Orient	A	0–1 (won 4–2 on agg)	1,036	
Third round	13 October 1999	Leicester City	A	0–2	13,701	

== Squad ==
Note: Flags indicate national team as defined under FIFA eligibility rules; some limited exceptions apply. Players may hold more than one non-FIFA nationality.

No.	Pos.	Nation	Player
1	GK	(Wales) WAL	Danny Coyne
2	DF	(England) ENG	John McDermott
3	DF	(England) ENG	Tony Gallimore
4	DF	(Scotland) SCO	Peter Handyside
5	DF	(England) ENG	Richard Smith
6	MF	(England) ENG	Wayne Burnett
7	MF	(England) ENG	Kevin Donovan
8	MF	(England) ENG	David Smith
9	FW	(England) ENG	Lee Ashcroft
10	FW	(England) ENG	Mark Nicholls (on loan from Chelsea)
11	MF	(England) ENG	Paul Groves
12	DF	(England) ENG	Danny Butterfield
13	GK	(England) ENG	Steve Croudson

No.	Pos.	Nation	Player
14	DF	(England) ENG	Steve Livingstone
15	DF	(England) ENG	Mark Lever
16	MF	(England) ENG	Stacy Coldicott
17	MF	(Northern Ireland) NIR	Kingsley Black
18	MF	(England) ENG	Adam Buckley
19	FW	(Republic of Ireland) IRL	Daryl Clare
20	DF	(England) ENG	Matthew Bloomer
21	GK	(England) ENG	Andy Love
22	DF	(England) ENG	Ben Chapman
23	DF	(England) ENG	Matt McKenzie
24	MF	(England) ENG	Matthew Oswin
25	FW	(England) ENG	Bradley Allen
26	MF	(England) ENG	Alan Pouton

=== Left club during season ===
Note: Flags indicate national team as defined under FIFA eligibility rules; some limited exceptions apply. Players may hold more than one non-FIFA nationality.

No. / Pos. / Nation / Player; 28 / MF / (England) ENG / Ian Hamilton (on loan from Sheffield United)	No. / Pos. / Nation / Player; 10 / FW / (England) ENG / Jack Lester (to Nottingham Forest)
