= Lee Ashcroft =

Lee Ashcroft may refer to:

- Lee Ashcroft (English footballer) (born 1972), English football manager and former forward
- Lee Ashcroft (Scottish footballer) (born 1993), Scottish football defender
