= Dean Stokes =

English former footballer and manager (born 1970)

Personal information
- Full name: Dean Anthony Stokes
- Date of birth: 23 May 1970 (age 56)
- Place of birth: Birmingham, England
- Height: 5 ft 7 in (1.70 m)
- Position: Left-back

Youth career
- Rochdale

Senior career*
Years	Team	Apps	(Gls)
- Castleton Gabriels
- Armitage 90
- Redditch United
1992–1993	Halesowen Town		
1993–1998	Port Vale	60	(0)
1998–2000	Rochdale	30	(0)
2000	Leek Town	5	(0)
- Alsager Town

Managerial career
- 2007–2008: Alsager Town
- 2009–20??: Rochdale Town
- * Club domestic league appearances and goals

Dean Anthony Stokes (born 23 March 1970) is an English former footballer and manager. A former professional with Port Vale and Rochdale throughout the 1990s, he spent time with numerous non-League clubs before moving into management with Alsager Town and later Rochdale Town. He helped Port Vale to promotion out of the Second Division in 1993–94 and played in the final of the 1996 Anglo-Italian Cup.

== Playing career ==
Stokes was a quick left-back, who after initially turning down Rochdale played for non-League sides Castleton Gabriels, Armitage 90, Redditch United and Halesowen Town.

He returned to the Football League in January 1993, signing for John Rudge's Port Vale of the Second Division. Halesowen Town eventually received £5,000 in payment due to appearance clauses. His professional debut came on 18 December 1993, at the age of 23, in a 1–1 draw with Burnley at Vale Park. He enjoyed regular football for the rest of the 1993–94 promotion winning season, though he did lose his place in April. After undergoing ankle surgery in August 1994, he hardly played in Vale's 1994–95 First Division campaign. He hardly featured in the 1995–96 season either, though he did come back into first-team plans in March 1996. He played in the 1996 Anglo-Italian Cup final, as Vale lost 5–2 to Genoa.

One of the most successful seasons in Port Vale's history was 1996–97; Stokes played eleven games, ten of which were in the league. In 1997–98, he again appeared infrequently, with just nine games that season; he was allowed to leave upon its conclusion. He returned to the team of his youth – Rochdale, who were, as ever, in the basement division. He was injured again after eleven games of 1998–99. Stokes enjoyed consistent football in 1999–2000 for the first time in a long time. He played 26 games, six of which were cup encounters. However, at the age of 30, he dropped out of the Football League to play for Leek Town. He played five games for Leek in August and September 2000.

== Management career ==
A veteran of the non-Leagues, Stokes became player-manager of Alsager Town in 2007. He quit the post in March 2008, and became part of the coaching set-up at Eccleshall.

In June 2009, he was made head coach at Rochdale Town. The club finished bottom of the North West Counties League in 2009–10.

== Post-retirement ==
Stokes worked as a P.E. teacher at Abraham Moss High School. In 2024, he was teaching at Falinge Park High School, Rochdale.

== Career statistics ==
Appearances and goals by club, season and competition
Club	Season	League			FA Cup		Other		Total	
Club	Season	Division	Apps	Goals	Apps	Goals	Apps	Goals	Apps	Goals
Port Vale	1993–94	Second Division	21	0	3	0	1	0	25	0
Port Vale	1994–95	First Division	3	0	0	0	0	0	3	0
Port Vale	1995–96	First Division	18	0	0	0	8	0	26	0
Port Vale	1996–97	First Division	10	0	1	0	0	0	11	0
Port Vale	1997–98	First Division	8	0	0	0	1	0	9	0
Port Vale	Total		60	0	4	0	10	0	74	0
Rochdale	1998–99	Third Division	11	0	0	0	3	0	14	0
Rochdale	1999–2000	Third Division	19	0	3	0	4	0	26	0
Rochdale	Total		30	0	3	0	7	0	40	0
Leek Town	2000–01	Northern Premier League; Premier Division	5	0	0	0	0	0	5	0

== Honours ==
Port Vale

- Football League Second Division second-place promotion: 1993–94
- Anglo-Italian Cup runner-up: 1996
