= Stacy Coldicott =

English footballer

Personal information
- Date of birth: 29 April 1974 (age 52)
- Place of birth: Redditch, England
- Position: Midfielder

Youth career
- West Bromwich Albion

Senior career*
Years	Team	Apps	(Gls)
1992–1998	West Bromwich Albion	104	(7)
1996	→ Cardiff City (loan)	6	(0)
1998–2005	Grimsby Town	221	(3)
2005–2006	Hereford United	5	(0)
2006	→ Cambridge United (loan)	4	(1)
2006–2007	Armthorpe Welfare		
2007	Feckenham		
2007	Grantham Town		
Total		340	(11)
- * Club domestic league appearances and goals

Stacy Coldicott (born 29 April 1974) is an English former professional footballer who played as a midfielder from 1992 to 2007.

He notably played in for Grimsby Town and West Bromwich Albion, having also had spells with Cardiff City, Hereford United, Cambridge United, Armthorpe Welfare, Feckenham and Grantham Town.

== Career ==
=== West Bromwich Albion ===
Coldicott was born in Redditch, Worcestershire, and came through the youth ranks at West Bromwich Albion and made his debut in the Football League in the 1992–93 season. The central midfielder featured for The Baggies until 1998, playing well over 100 games in all competitions, and had a brief loan spell with Cardiff City, before signing for former West Bromwich Albion manager Alan Buckley at Grimsby Town for a fee of £125,000.

=== Grimsby Town ===
Coldicott and Lee Ashcroft were the only additions to a squad newly promoted to Division One. Grimsby started well in Coldicott's first season with the club, but poor results in the later part of the season meant they finished in 11th position. He played regularly for the first team, combining well with players such as Paul Groves, Alan Pouton, Kevin Donovan and Wayne Burnett. Coldicott continued to feature despite changes of management, and played in three divisions for The Mariners, remaining with the club despite a broken leg which kept him out for nearly a year. After nearly 250 appearances in all competitions, Coldicott was released by manager Russell Slade in the summer of 2005 after choosing not to accept the offer of a short-term contract.

=== Non-League career ===
Coldicott signed for Conference club Hereford United, but suffered a back injury in September 2005 which kept him out for several months. He spent time on loan at Cambridge United in an attempt to improve his fitness, but his contract with Hereford was cancelled by mutual consent at the end of the 2005–06 season. In the new season, he played for Northern Counties East League club Armthorpe Welfare, and occasionally turned out for Feckenham in the Midland Combination

After starting the 2007–08 season with Grantham Town, but retired soon after to take up his career as a fireman.

== Personal life ==
Coldicott is the former husband of Big Brother 4 contestant Steph Coldicott; the couple were going through their divorce during her appearance on the 2003 show. Coldicott decided to retire from football in 2007 to concentrate on his career as a firefighter. He was co-owner of a non-League football scouting website. Coldicott worked as a Fireman since retiring from Football, although now works as a financial advisor and lives in the West Midlands.
