= Mark Nicholls (footballer) =

English footballer (born 1977)

Personal information
- Full name: Mark Phool Nicholls
- Date of birth: 30 May 1977 (age 49)
- Place of birth: Hillingdon, England
- Position: Forward

Youth career
- Chelsea

Senior career*
Years	Team	Apps	(Gls)
1995–2001	Chelsea	36	(3)
1995–1996	→ Chertsey Town (loan)		
1999–2000	→ Reading (loan)	5	(1)
2000	→ Grimsby Town (loan)	6	(0)
2000	→ Colchester United (loan)	4	(0)
2001	Aldershot Town	0	(0)
2001	Partick Thistle	1	(0)
2001	Torquay United	9	(1)
2001	Hamilton Academical	2	(2)
2001–2002	Clydebank	11	(0)
2002	Chesham United		
2002–2003	Maidenhead United	18	(2)
2003–2004	Northwood	27	(12)
2004–2005	Hendon	22	(11)
2005–2006	Uxbridge		
2006	Hayes		
2006–2007	Northwood	13	(6)
2007–2009	Uxbridge		
2009–2010	Beaconsfield SYCOB		
2010–2011	Walton Casuals	49	(7)
2011–2013	North Greenford United	27	(3)
2015–2016	Southall	2	(0)
2019	North Greenford United	2	(0)
Total		234+	(48+)

Managerial career
- 2004–2005: Hendon (player-assistant manager)
- 2011–2013: North Greenford United (player-assistant manager)
- 2020–2021: FC Clacton
- * Club domestic league appearances and goals

Mark Nicholls (born 30 May 1977) is an English former professional footballer who played as a striker from 1994 until 2012, most notably in the Premier League for Chelsea. He was assistant to Neil Shipperley at North Greenford United before the pair left after the 2011–12 season. He then returned with Shipperley to North Greenford United in October 2012 after Jon-Barrie Bates left by mutual consent.

He also played in the Football League for Reading, Grimsby Town, Colchester United and Torquay United, as well as playing in the Scottish Football League for Partick Thistle, Hamilton Academical and Clydebank.

== Playing career ==
=== Chelsea ===
Nicholls was born in Hillingdon, London. A forward, he began his career as a trainee with Chelsea, turning professional in August 1995. He made his league debut in the 1996–97 season, after gaining experience on loan with non-league Chertsey Town, but made a real breakthrough into the Chelsea side the following season, appearing in 18 Premier League games in 1997–98. That season he also scored three league goals; one after coming on as a substitute as Chelsea won 6–1 at rivals Tottenham Hotspur in December 1997, and two more, again after coming on as a substitute, against Coventry City the following month. That season Chelsea also won the 1997–98 League Cup and the 1997–98 UEFA Cup Winners' Cup. Nicholls wasn't part of the squad for either final but contributed two appearances to each of the cup runs. At the start of the League Cup run Chelsea needed a penalty shoot-out to beat Blackburn Rovers, and Nicholls scored the winning penalty to send Chelsea through.

However, as the number of foreign imports grew at Stamford Bridge, he fell further out of the reckoning and joined Reading on loan in December 1999 with a view to a permanent move. Despite scoring three goals including one on his debut, the move fell through and on 10 February he returned to a peripheral role at Stamford Bridge. He joined Grimsby Town on loan on 24 February 2000, and then Colchester United on loan on 6 October the following season. He had an unsuccessful trial with Motherwell in March 2001 and was released by Chelsea at the end of the season, having scored three times in 36 league games, although 25 of those appearances were as a substitute.

=== Latter career ===
In May 2001 he joined Aberdeen on trial, but nothing came of it and by July he was playing for Aldershot Town, and later had a trial with Swindon Town. He joined Partick Thistle on non-contract terms on 18 August 2001, but played just once in a 1–0 home win over Inverness Caledonian Thistle.

He joined Torquay United on non-contract terms on 7 September 2001, making his debut in the 1–0 home defeat against local rivals Plymouth Argyle the following day when he came on as an 81st-minute substitute for Kevin Hill. He played nine times for Roy McFarland's side, scoring once against Darlington, before being released on 25 October, having failed to adapt to Third Division football.

Soon after, he began a trial at Hamilton Academical, signing for them on 3 November in time to make his debut in a 3–0 defeat away to Forfar Athletic. However, he played only once more for the Accies, scoring twice in the 3–2 defeat at home to Stenhousemuir a week later, before joining Clydebank on 24 November. With Clydebank going out of business in the 2002 close-season, Nicholls joined non-league Chesham United, but moved to Maidenhead United soon after.

In October 2003 he moved to Northwood, leaving for Hendon in the summer of 2004. He was appointed as player-assistant manager of Hendon in December 2004, but in February 2005 he signed for Uxbridge, but left to join Hayes the following summer. In September 2006 he rejoined Northwood only to re-sign for Uxbridge in January 2007.

However, Nicholls has a reputation in non-league circles for a poor disciplinary record. On 13 January 2009 he was one of three Uxbridge players sent off in the first half of their FA Trophy tie against Swindon Supermarine, the West London side eventually going down to a 6–1 defeat. Nicholls left the club by mutual consent soon after this game, to sign for divisional rivals Beaconsfield SYCOB where he was rumoured to play an instrumental part in an end of season brawl at AFC Totton. He was also dismissed after being accused of spitting at a referee during his six-month spell at Hendon and collected a series of yellow cards for dissent at the club.

== Coaching career ==
On 26 December 2011, Nicholls decided to join former manager and his former Chelsea teammate Neil Shipperley at North Greenford United as assistant manager. He made his debut for North Greenford United on 2 January 2012 during a 1–1 draw away at his former side Northwood, coming on in the 90th minute for Ricky Pither.

On 28 October 2020, Nicholls took over as first team manager at FC Clacton - a role he held until October 2021.

== Career statistics ==
Appearances and goals by club, season and competition
Club	Season	League			National Cup		League Cup		Europe		Other		Total	
Club	Season	Division	Apps	Goals	Apps	Goals	Apps	Goals	Apps	Goals	Apps	Goals	Apps	Goals
Chelsea	1996–97	Premier League	8	0	0	0	2	0	―		―		10	0
Chelsea	1997–98	Premier League	18	3	1	0	2	0	2 (Note: Appearances in UEFA Cup Winners' Cup)	0	―		23	3
Chelsea	1998–99	Premier League	9	0	3	0	2	0	2	0	―		16	0
Chelsea	1999–00	Premier League	0	0	0	0	1	0	1 (Note: Appearance in UEFA Champions League)	0	―		2	0
Chelsea	Total		36	3	4	0	7	0	5	0	―		52	3
Reading (loan)	1999–00	Second Division	5	1	―		―		―		2 (Note: Appearances in Football League Trophy)	2	7	3
Grimsby Town (loan)	1999–00	First Division	6	0	―		―		―		―		6	0
Colchester United (loan)	2000–01	Second Division	4	0	―		―		―		―		4	0
Partick Thistle	2001–02	Scottish First Division	1	0	―		―		―		―		1	0
Torquay United	2001–02	Third Division	9	1	―		1	0	―		1	0	11	1
Hamilton Academical	2001–02	Scottish Third Division	2	2	―		―		―		―		2	2
Clydebank	2001–02	Scottish Second Division	11	0	1	0	―		―		―		12	0
Hendon	2004–05	Isthmian League Premier Division	22	11	5	2	―		―		10 (Note: 3 appearances and 2 goals in FA Trophy, 2 appearances and 3 goals in Middlesex Senior Cup, 2 appearances and 2 goals in London Senior Cup, 1 appearance and 2 goals in Isthmian League Cup, 1 appearance and 3 goals in Middlesex Millennium Cup, 1 appearance and 1 goal in George Ruffell Memorial Shield)	11	37	24
Walton Casuals	2011–12	Isthmian League First Division South	10	1	0	0	―		―		1 (Note: Appearance in Isthmian League Cup)	0	11	1
North Greenford United	2011–12	Southern League First Division Central	8	0	―		―		―		4 (Note: 2 appearances in Southern League Cup, 1 appearance in Middlesex Senior Cup, 1 appearance and 2 goals in Middlesex Senior Charity Cup)	2	12	2
North Greenford United	2012–13	Southern League First Division Central	19	3	0	0	―		―		2 (Note: 1 appearance in Southern League Cup, 1 appearance in Middlesex Senior Cup)	0	21	3
North Greenford United	Total		27	3	0	0	―		―		6	2	33	5
Southall	2015–16	Spartan South Midlands League First Division	2	0	0	0	―		―		0	0	2	0
North Greenford United	2018–19	Spartan South Midlands League Premier Division	2	0	0	0	―		―		0	0	2	0
North Greenford United	North Greenford United total		29	3	0	0	―		―		6	2	35	5
Career total			137	22	10	2	8	0	5	0	20	15	180	39

== Honours ==
Hendon

- George Ruffell Memorial Shield: 2004
