= Kevin Seabury =

English footballer

Personal information
- Date of birth: 24 November 1973 (age 52)
- Place of birth: Shrewsbury, England
- Position: Defender

Senior career*
Years	Team	Apps	(Gls)
1992–2002	Shrewsbury Town	229	(7)
2002	Dover Athletic	15	(2)
2002	Welling United	?	(?)
Total		244	(9)
- * Club domestic league appearances and goals

Kevin Seabury (born 24 November 1973, in Shrewsbury) is an English former professional footballer, who most notably played for his home-town club Shrewsbury Town.

After leaving school, Seabury joined Shrewsbury Town, and was offered a professional contract at the start of the 1992/93 season. Seabury was to stay with Shrewsbury for just under 10 years, making 206 league starts and scoring 9 league goals. In total he made 258 appearances in a Shrewsbury shirt (including cup games).

In January 2002, Seabury transferred to Dover Athletic, where he made 15 appearances during the second half of the 2001/02 season, scoring 2 goals. He was to move to Welling United in July 2002 and captained the side during his stay there. After two seasons at Welling, Seabury had short stays at Hednesford Town and Bridgnorth Town before retiring from senior football in 2004.

Seabury married Victoria West at the Abbey Church, Shrewsbury in 2007.
