= Robert Sawyers =

English footballer

Personal information
- Date of birth: 20 November 1978 (age 47)
- Place of birth: Smethwick, England
- Height: 5 ft 10 in (1.78 m)
- Position: Left back

Senior career*
Years	Team	Apps	(Gls)
1997	Wolverhampton Wanderers	0	(0)
1997–2002	Barnet	113	(5)
2002–2003	Hereford United	11	(1)
2003–2004	Redditch United	2	(0)
2004	Stourbridge		
Total		126	(6)
- * Club domestic league appearances and goals

Robert Sawyers (born 20 November 1978) is an English retired professional footballer who played as a defender for Wolverhampton Wanderers and Barnet in the Football League.
