= Julian Dowe =

English footballer

Personal information
- Full name: Julian Whytus Lennox Dowe
- Date of birth: 9 September 1975 (age 51)
- Place of birth: Manchester, England
- Position: Forward

Youth career
- Manchester United
- Everton
- Manchester City
- 1992–1993: Wigan Athletic

Senior career*
Years	Team	Apps	(Gls)
1992–1993	Wigan Athletic	5	(0)
1993–1994	Atlético Marbella	6	(2)
1994–1995	Ayr United	7	(1)
1995	Tidaholm GoIF	5	(0)
1995–1996	Hyde United	9	(1)
1998–1999	Colne	28	(7)
1999–2000	Rochdale	10	(1)
1999–2000	→ Burton Albion (loan)	5	(0)
2000–2001	Morecambe	9	(1)
2001	FK Ventspils	14	(8)
2001	Oldham Town		
2001–2002	Bacup Borough		
2002–2003	Hyde United	1	(0)
2003–2004	New Mills		
- * Club domestic league appearances and goals

Julian Whytus Lennox Dowe (born 9 September 1975) is an English retired professional footballer and founder of football4football. He played as a forward for clubs in England, Scotland, Sweden, Spain and Latvia.

== Career ==
Having broke numerous goal scoring records in the Salford Junior League and for Trafford Schoolboys as a teenager, he was coveted by both of his local teams, Manchester United and Manchester City, as well as Leeds United. After a brief spell at Manchester United, he signed as a schoolboy for Everton after its youth team manager personally made the trip to his mother's house. He later decided to join Manchester City, who took the unprecedented step to virtually guarantee Dowe a professional contract, even though he was still at school and recovering from a fractured spine at the time, after being injured in an Everton reserve game. After 8 months he resumed training and playing with the first team squad that included Garry Flitcroft, Steve Lomas and Clive Allen at Maine Road when only 15 years old. After some misguided advice, he left Maine Road for Wigan, something that Dowe cited as "A big regret, it had great fans but wasn't the professionally run club you see now." The then Wigan manager Brian Hamilton famously substituted Dowe minutes after bringing him on at half time of a trial game, to immediately offer him a professional contract aged 16.

He played his first team debut for Wigan against a Manchester United team that with Paul Ince, David Beckham, Paul Scholes, Lee Sharpe and Gary Neville. He became the youngest British player to sign a professional contract in Spain at age 18 when he was taken to CA Marbella by the manager Dragoslav Šekularac, with the fellow English player Andy Gray who signed from Tottenham Hotspur and described Dowe as "one of the most talented teenagers he'd seen".

At Marbella, his first team chances were limited due to the foreigner rule that applied before the Bosman ruling. Players such as Vladan Lukić and Predrag Spasić were teammates. Dowe played mainly in cup games and pre-season tournaments against teams like Real Zaragoza and Barcelona. Dowe went on to play in the Scottish 1st division for Ayr United, under the former Queens Park Rangers and Aston Villa player Simon Stainrod. In 1995, he memorably scored a goal with a 35-yard volley in the Ayrshire Cup Final during a win over local rivals Kilmarnock F.C. After the season ended, he went to play in the Swedish league for Tidaholm GoIF.

Returning to England he went into non-league football playing for Hyde United which saw him play in their most successful run in the FA Vase competition. A persistent knee injury stopped him playing for the best part of two years. On his return, he played in the north-west counties with Colne F.C. before returning to league football with Rochdale. Again, glimpses of his ability occasionally surfaced, particularly in an FA Cup game against Burton Albion, when he scored with a 30-yard kick to seal a 3–0 win. On leaving Rochdale he joined Morecambe, playing his first game for the club on 23 September 2000. He later joined the Latvian team FK Ventspils which signed him after a trial game against the Latvia national team after which he continued playing in non-league football around Greater Manchester before the accumulation of seven knee operations totally ended his playing career.

Dowe created the football resource football4football.
