= Gareth Stoker =

English footballer

Personal information
- Date of birth: 22 February 1973 (age 53)
- Place of birth: Bishop Auckland, England
- Position: Midfielder

Youth career
- 1990–1991: Leeds United

Senior career*
| Years | Team | Apps | (Gls) |
| 1991–1993 | Hull City | 30 | (2) |
| 1995–1997 | Hereford United | 58 | (6) |
| 1997–1999 | Cardiff City | 36 | (4) |
| 1999 | Rochdale | 12 | (1) |
| 1999 | →Scarborough (loan) | 17 | (4) |
| 1999–2003 | Scarborough | 123 | (2) |
| 2003–2004 | Forest Green Rovers | 23 | (0) |
| 2004–2006 | Leigh RMI | 23 | (5) |
| 2006–2008 | Wakefield | | |
- * Club domestic league appearances and goals

Gareth Stoker (born 22 February 1973 in Bishop Auckland) is an English former professional footballer. Playing as a midfielder Stoker represented a number of clubs both in the Football League and at various levels of non-League football.

== Playing career ==
Stoker started as a youth team player at Leeds United but was not offered terms and instead turned professional with Hull City in 1991. He subsequently featured for Hereford United before an £80,000 move to Cardiff City in January 1997. Stoker enjoyed a good start to his career at the club, scoring twice in his first two months in Cardiff. However ultimately he struggled for form at the Bluebirds and missed months of football after suffering a cruciate ligament injury in March 1998.

Given a free transfer in February 1999, Stoker signed for Rochdale although, despite scoring in the league game against Cambridge United, he was loaned out to Conference National side Scarborough in September of that year. The move was made permanent just before Christmas and Stoker remained at the club until 2003.

== Coaching career ==
He subsequently appeared for Forest Green Rovers and Leigh RMI before joining Wakefield in October 2006 as player-assistant manager. In May 2008 he took up the position of assistant manager at Ossett Town, having ended his playing career.
