= Lee Gledhill =

English footballer

Personal information
- Full name: Lee Cameron Gledhill
- Date of birth: 7 November 1980 (age 45)
- Place of birth: Bury, England
- Height: 5 ft 10 in (1.78 m)
- Positions: Centre back; right back

Youth career
- Barnet

Senior career*
Years	Team	Apps	(Gls)
1998–2002	Barnet	65	(0)
2002–2004	St Albans City	37	(0)
2004–2005	Gravesend & Northfleet	35	(0)
2005–2006	Welling United	?	(?)
2006–2008	Metropolitan Police	?	(?)
2008–2009	Folkestone Invicta	?	(?)
2009–2010	Metropolitan Police	?	(?)
2010	Erith & Belvedere	?	(?)
2011	Harlow Town	?	(?)
2011–2012	Maidstone United	4	(0)
- * Club domestic league appearances and goals

Lee Cameron Gledhill is an English former footballer who played as a right back. Gledhill was born in Bury. Gledhill began his career playing professionally at Barnet before going on to play in Non-League football for St Albans City, Gravesend & Northfleet, Welling United, Metropolitan Police, Folkestone Invicta, Erith & Belvedere, Harlow Town and Maidstone United.

== Career ==
Gledhill came through the ranks at Barnet, where he captained the youth team in the 1998–99 season, and made his first team debut in a 2–1 away win at Swansea City. Gledhill went on to play 68 times for The Bees in Division Three (now League Two) and the Football Conference before having his contract with the club mutually terminated, citing that he wanted to pursue a full-time career outside of football.

Gledhill subsequently signed for Isthmian League Premier Division outfit St Albans City, spending just over a year at the club before joining Gravesend & Northfleet (now Ebbsfleet United) in the Conference.

In the summer of 2005 Gledhill then joined Welling United and he spent a season at the club before joining Metropolitan Police. Gledhill spent two years with The Met before signing for Kent team Folkestone Invicta in 2008. After a year with Invicta Gledhill returned to Metropolitan Police before dropping down to play for Kent League club Erith & Belvedere in 2010.

At the turn of 2011 Gledhill signed for Isthmian League Division One North Harlow Town. Gledhill spent eleven months for the club before departing, citing family reasons. In December 2011 Gledhill signed for Isthmian League Division One South Maidstone United, where he joined up with old Gravesend teammates James Pinnock and Jay Saunders, the latter of whom manages the Stones. Gledhill lasted just a month at the club, making just four appearances before being released after losing his place in the first team to Sam Groombridge.
