= Jason Lydiate =

English footballer and coach

Personal information
- Full name: Jason Lee Lydiate
- Date of birth: 29 October 1971 (age 55)
- Place of birth: Manchester, England
- Position: Defender

Youth career
- 1987–1990: Manchester United

Senior career*
Years	Team	Apps	(Gls)
1990–1992	Manchester United	0	(0)
1992–1995	Bolton Wanderers	30	(0)
1995–1998	Blackpool	87	(2)
1998–1999	Scarborough	27	(1)
1999	→ Rochdale (loan)	14	(1)
1999	Finn Harps	1	(0)
2003	Hyde United	10	(0)
Total		168	(4)
- * Club domestic league appearances and goals

Jason Lee Lydiate (born 29 October 1971) is an English former professional footballer. He is a coach with Rochdale.

== Career ==
Born in Manchester, Lydiate who played as a right-back, began his career as a trainee with Alex Ferguson's Manchester United in 1990. After two years at Old Trafford, he joined Bolton Wanderers on a free transfer.

After averaging just ten league appearances per season for Wanderers in three seasons, in 1995 Lydiate was snapped up by Sam Allardyce at Blackpool for a fee of £75,000. He went on to make 87 appearances for the Seasiders in three years, before moving to the east coast to join Scarborough.

Towards the end of his stay at the McCain Stadium, Lydiate was loaned out to Rochdale. He was one of three players owed money by 'Boro upon their release from the club. A transfer embargo was placed on the club until the debts to the players were paid. He later joined Finn Harps on a short-term contract. In his only match for the club, he shot past his own keeper from outside the box. He later joined Hyde United in 2003, for whom he made 10 appearances.

== Honours ==
Individual

- Denzil Haroun Reserve Team Player of the Year: 1990–91
