= Karl Murray =

English footballer

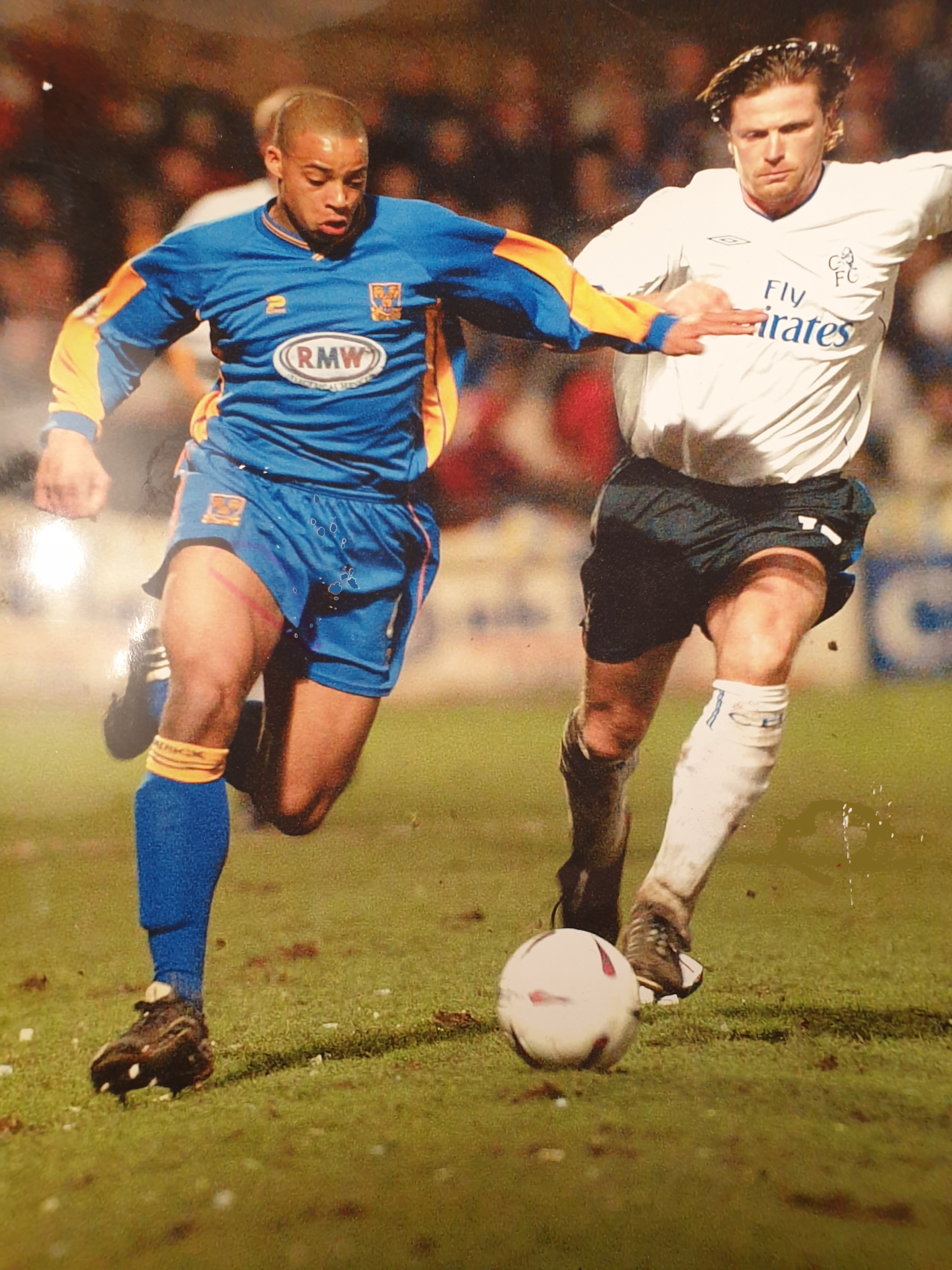
- Murray playing against Emmanuel Petit

Personal information
- Full name: Karl Anthony Murray
- Date of birth: 24 June 1982 (age 44)
- Place of birth: Islington, London, England
- Position: Midfielder

Youth career
- ????–1999: Shrewsbury Town

Senior career*
Years	Team	Apps	(Gls)
1999–2004	Shrewsbury Town	114	(5)
2003	→ Northwich Victoria (loan)	3	(0)
2004–2007	Woking	134	(13)
2007–2008	Grays Athletic	23	(3)
2008	Eastleigh	?	(?)
2008–2009	Bromley	6	(0)
2008	→ Sutton United (loan)	6	(0)
2008–2009	→ Ebbsfleet United (loan)	8	(0)
2009	→ Northwich Victoria (loan)	?	(?)
2009	Croydon Athletic	?	(?)
2009–2010	Carshalton Athletic	?	(?)
2010–2011	Sutton United	?	(?)
2012	Maidstone United	10	(0)

International career
- England C
- * Club domestic league appearances and goals as of 22:00, 1 June 2012 (UTC)

Karl Anthony Murray (born 26 August 1982) is an English former professional footballer who played as a midfielder.

== Career ==
Born in the shadow of Arsenals Highbury Stadium, Murray's footballing career began with Shrewsbury Town after becoming one of the first protégés of the Youth Team set up. He was bought in by former "Shrews" man Jake King winning Player of the Year in his second season. He was a regular starter for manager Kevin Ratcliffe and was part of the FA Cup side that saw Shrewsbury play Chelsea at Gay Meadow.

Murray was primarily a midfielder in his time but was also able to offer cover at centre back. By 2002 Shrewsbury Town had been relegated and he found himself sent out on loan to Northwich Victoria, the former club of then manager Jimmy Quinn. Murray was released and returned to his native south and signed for Woking FC.

Murray was a regular starter for Woking winning both Players Player of the Year and Supporters Player of the Year during his 134 games in which he scored important free kicks and goals.

His impressive performances got him a national call up in 2006 for the England C side in a game he started against Italy at Shrewsbury Towns home ground.

Murray was signed by Grays Athletic from Woking on 18 May 2007 but later moved to Eastleigh signing an 18-month contract.

At the start of the 2008–09 season Murray signed for Bromley. On 12 November he signed for Ebbsfleet United on a short-term loan deal and was made Club Captain.

In January 2009 Murray was signed on loan by Northwich Victoria and made his debut in the 2–1 home league defeat against Histon. He returned to Bromley in February 2009. In late 2009 after a spell with Croydon Athletic Murray was signed by Isthmian League club Carshalton Athletic. In September 2010 he moved to neighbours Sutton United and helped them to win the Isthmian League Premier Division title for the 2010–11 season. Murray left Sutton in December 2011 when Sutton changed to full-time.

Murray decided to concentrate on his work and family commitments.

On 20 February 2012 it was announced Murray had signed for Isthmian League Division One South club Maidstone United. He made his debut in a 4–2 away win at Merstham. Murray left the Stones in the summer of 2012.

Following his retirement from football, Karl now works as a decorator.
