= Lee Howells =

English footballer (born 1968)

Personal information
- Full name: Lee David Howells
- Date of birth: 14 October 1968 (age 58)
- Place of birth: Fremantle, Australia
- Height: 5 ft 11 in (1.80 m)
- Position: Midfielder

Senior career*
Years	Team	Apps	(Gls)
1986–1988	Bristol Rovers	0	(0)
1988–1991	Brisbane City FC	?	(?)
1991–2004	Cheltenham Town	367	(66)
2004	→ Merthyr Tydfil (loan)	13	(0)
2004–2005	Merthyr Tydfil	26	(2)
2005	Mangotsfield United	11	(0)
2005–2006	Clevedon Town	5	(0)
2006	Mangotsfield United	1	(0)
Total		423	(68)

Managerial career
- 2006–2007: Mangotsfield United
- 2012–2016: Bath City
- * Club domestic league appearances and goals

Lee David Howells (born 14 October 1968) is a football manager and former player who played as a midfielder for Bristol Rovers and Cheltenham Town in the Football League.

He was the manager of Conference South side Bath City between 2012 and 2016. As assistant manager, he helped them gain promotion in the 2009–10 season.
