= Jamie Ingledow =

English footballer

Personal information
- Date of birth: 23 August 1980 (age 46)
- Place of birth: Barnsley, England
- Height: 5 ft 7 in (1.70 m)
- Position: Midfielder

Senior career*
Years	Team	Apps	(Gls)
1997–2000	Rotherham United	25	(2)
2000–2002	Chesterfield	40	(3)
2002–2003	Halifax Town	1	(0)
2003–2004	Wakefield & Emley		
- * Club domestic league appearances and goals

Jamie Ingledow (born 23 August 1980) is an English former professional footballer who played in The Football League for Rotherham United, Chesterfield and Halifax Town.

After his professional football career, he played as an amateur for Wakefield & Emley. He then became a professional chef, working in the Lake District.
