= Mark Williams (footballer, born 1978) =

English football defender

Personal information
- Full name: Mark Thomas Williams
- Date of birth: 10 November 1978 (age 47)
- Place of birth: Liverpool, England
- Position: Defender

Senior career*
Years	Team	Apps	(Gls)
1996–1997	Tranmere Rovers	0	(0)
1997	Barrow		
1998–1999	Rochdale	14	(1)
1999–2001	Rotherham United	11	(0)
2001	Hereford United		
2002	Chester City		
2004–2005	Geylang United		
- * Club domestic league appearances and goals

Mark Thomas Williams (born 10 November 1978) is an English former footballer who played in the Football League for Rochdale and Rotherham United.
