= Alan Pouton =

English footballer

Personal information
- Date of birth: 1 February 1977 (age 49)
- Place of birth: Newcastle, England
- Position: Midfielder

Youth career
- Newcastle United

Senior career*
Years	Team	Apps	(Gls)
1995–1996	Oxford United	0	(0)
1996–1999	York City	90	(7)
1999	→ Grimsby Town (loan)	4	(0)
1999–2004	Grimsby Town	116	(12)
2004–2007	Gillingham	62	(3)
2004	→ Hartlepool United (loan)	5	(0)
2007–2009	Dover Athletic	46	(7)
2009	Maidstone United	4	(0)
2009–2010	Sutton United	31	(4)
Total		358	(33)

Managerial career
- 2011–2012: Maidstone United (assistant)
- * Club domestic league appearances and goals

Alan Pouton (born 1 February 1977) is an English former football coach and professional footballer who played as a midfielder from 1995 to 2010.

Pouton was a product of Newcastle United's youth team but was signed as a professional by Oxford United. He signed on pro terms at the beginning of the 1995–96 season but soon after joined York City where he remained for two years. In 1999, he signed for Grimsby Town where he arguably spent the best years of his career. Pouton notched up 120 league appearances and 12 goals in his four-and-a-half-year stay with the club. In 2004, he was sold to Gillingham but soon after he spent time on loan with Hartlepool United. His time with the Gills was dogged by injury woes and he eventually retired in 2007. A few months after retiring Pouton signed on a semi-professional terms for Dover Athletic and later went on to play for Maidstone United and Sutton United before eventually hanging his boots up permanently in 2010. In 2011, he returned to Maidstone as assistant manager. He left the club in January 2012 as part of budget cuts within the club.

== Playing career ==
=== Oxford United ===
Pouton came through the youth ranks at Newcastle United, his hometown club, but was not retained, and tried his luck at Oxford United. Again, he was never presented with an opportunity to play during his time there and was released at the end of the 1995–96 season.

=== York City ===
Pouton was snapped up on a free transfer by York City in time for the 1996-97 season. His debut came early on in the season as a substitute in the 2–1 home defeat against AFC Bournemouth. He produced some good performances in the reserves and was eventually rewarded with his first start in the 3–0 home win against Hartlepool United. Pouton went on to make 25 appearances that season, three of which were in the FA Cup. His first career goal was an 80th minute consolation goal in the 4–2 home defeat to Brentford. The following season saw Pouton firmly establish himself as a tough tackling midfielder, although his over-exuberance led to six bookings that season (to add to the six he had received the previous season). The highlight of the 1997/98 season for Pouton undoubtedly came at Roots Hall in a 4–4 draw with Southend United in which he scored twice. Pouton only scored once the following season, but he managed to pick up nine bookings as he started to pick up a reputation as a tough tackler.

=== Grimsby Town ===
At the beginning of the 1999-2000 season, Grimsby Town made an approach to take Pouton on loan. Despite not starting a game during his month-long loan spell, Pouton impressed sufficiently in his six substitute appearances to prompt Grimsby to pay £150,000 to secure him on a permanent basis. Upon signing, Pouton became a first team regular and went on to play in the majority of Grimsby's games that season. Surprisingly, in hindsight, Pouton only picked up two bookings that season in 41 games. His first goal for Grimsby (and only goal of the season) was an equaliser at Blundell Park, Pouton volleyed in at the far post after Nicky Weaver parried Lee Ashcroft's cross in a 1–1 draw with Manchester City. Over the next three seasons, Pouton was booked 18 times and sent off twice. Despite his occasional lapses in discipline, Pouton was generally a success at Grimsby, and although he was not noted for his goals, he still managed eleven goals including a hat-trick in the 6–2 home win against Wimbledon (although two of those goals were penalties). He became a cult hero for his Never Say Die attitude, and his repeat step-overs, although he suffered increasing disciplinary problems, missing many games through a combination of injury and suspension. In the 2002-03 season, Grimsby were relegated to Division Two after finishing bottom of Division One. Injury prevented Pouton from playing until December and he only then played five times before leaving the club to free up finances.

=== Gillingham ===
Gillingham signed Pouton initially on loan, they eventually paid £30,000 to sign him on a permanent basis. Pouton did reasonably well in a season in which Gillingham narrowly survived relegation, staying up by one goal whilst Walsall were relegated instead. The next season was poor by Pouton's standards. He started the season on loan to Hartlepool United, for whom he played six times and scored in the 3–3 draw with Hull City in the Football League Trophy (Hartlepool won 4–1 on penalties). He returned to Gillingham, but only played a handful of games (twelve) as Gillingham were finally relegated. The 2005-06 season was better for Pouton as he re-established himself in midfield. He played in the opening day victory over Colchester United and were it not for a succession of injuries perhaps would have played in more than the 24 games in which he appeared. Injuries continued to bedevil him in the following season, and on 31 January 2007 it was announced that he had opted to retire.

=== Dover Athletic ===
Pouton came out of retirement in June 2007 to sign on a semi-professional basis for Dover Athletic, however injuries again restricted him in claiming a regular first team place. During his spell at Dover Athletic, Pouton gained two promotions to the Isthmian League Premier Division and then the Conference South.

=== Maidstone United ===
At the end of the 2008–09 season Pouton decided against signing a new contract with Dover due to work commitments and further travelling. He subsequently signed for fellow Kent side Maidstone United where he was soon appointed vice captain.

=== Sutton United ===
In late August 2009 Pouton left Maidstone after just four appearances to join Isthmian League Premier Division rivals Sutton United. Pouton made his debut for Sutton on 5 September 2009 against Boreham Wood and played for the rest of the 2009–10 campaign at the Gander Green Lane club before retiring from playing at the end of the season.

== Coaching career ==
On 18 March 2011, Pouton was named caretaker assistant manager at Maidstone United, who at the time were eight points adrift at the bottom of the Isthmian League Premier Division. He joined up with former Maidstone teammate Jay Saunders who had just been given the role of player-caretaker manager at the club. Saunders and Pouton led Maidstone to five wins from nine games, and although it was not enough to save Maidstone from relegation, Saunders and Pouton were both awarded their respective roles on a permanent basis on 2 May 2011. Pouton left the Stones in January 2012 following budget cuts at the club.

== Personal life ==
Pouton is a keen supporter of Newcastle United.

== Honours ==
=== Player ===
Dover Athletic

- Isthmian League Division One South: 2007–08
- Isthmian League Premier Division: 2008–09
