= Mark Monington =

English footballer

Personal information
- Full name: Mark David Monington
- Date of birth: 21 October 1970 (age 56)
- Place of birth: Bilsthorpe, England
- Height: 6 ft 1 in (1.85 m)
- Position: Central defender

Senior career*
Years	Team	Apps	(Gls)
1988–1994	Burnley	84	(5)
1994–1998	Rotherham United	79	(3)
1998–2001	Rochdale	95	(12)
2001–2002	Boston United	16	(0)
2002	→ Halifax Town (loan)	5	(0)
2002–2006	Halifax Town	47	(7)
- * Club domestic league appearances and goals

Mark David Monington (born 21 October 1970) is an English former professional footballer who played as a central defender.

== Honours ==
Burnley

- Football League Fourth Division: 1991–92
