= Andy Morris (footballer) =

English footballer

Personal information
- Full name: Andrew Dean Morris
- Date of birth: 17 November 1967 (age 58)
- Place of birth: Sheffield, England
- Height: 6 ft 5 in (1.96 m)
- Position: Striker

Youth career
- 1985–1986: Rotherham United

Senior career*
Years	Team	Apps	(Gls)
1985–1988	Rotherham United	0	(0)
1988–1998	Chesterfield	225	(56)
1992	→ Exeter City (loan)	4	(2)
1998–2000	Rochdale	26	(7)
1999–2000	→ Scarborough (loan)	6	(2)
2000–2001	Hucknall Town		
- * Club domestic league appearances and goals as of 19:53, 10 March 2008 (UTC)

Andrew Dean Morris (born 17 November 1967) is a retired footballer. He works as Chesterfield's Football in the Community Officer, having replaced Nicky Law in summer 2000. He played his last competitive football for Hucknall Town.

He was nicknamed "Bruno" by Chesterfield fans for an alleged resemblance to the British boxer, Frank Bruno.

He is most fondly remembered at Chesterfield, where urban legend states he arrived from Rotherham for a fee of £500 and a bag of footballs. In the 1996–97 season, Morris was part of Chesterfield's historic FA Cup semi finalists – scoring the first goal in the semi-final at Old Trafford against Middlesbrough, and winning a penalty for the second.

The following season, Andy Morris was granted a testimonial match versus Nottingham Forest. Due to persistent injury problems, he left Saltergate shortly after and negotiated a contract with Rochdale.

Morris ended his time as a player at Hucknall Town but returned to Chesterfield in 2000 in order to become the club's Football in the Community Manager, and this is a position he still occupies.

== Honours ==
Chesterfield

- Football League Third Division play-offs: 1995
