= Graham Lancashire =

English footballer

Personal information
- Date of birth: 19 October 1972 (age 54)
- Place of birth: Blackpool, England
- Position: Forward

Youth career
- 1989–1991: Burnley

Senior career*
Years	Team	Apps	(Gls)
1989–1994	Burnley	31	(8)
1992	→ Halifax Town (loan)	2	(0)
1994	→ Chester City (loan)	11	(7)
1994–1996	Preston North End	23	(2)
1996	→ Wigan Athletic (loan)	4	(3)
1996–1997	Wigan Athletic	26	(13)
1997–2001	Rochdale	83	(23)
2001–2003	Hednesford Town		
- * Club domestic league appearances and goals as of 4 January 2008

Graham Lancashire (born 19 October 1972, Blackpool) is a former professional footballer who played as a striker. He spent most of his career in the north-west of England.

== Playing career ==
Lancashire ascended through Burnley's youth ranks, making his Football League debut in the 1990-91 season. His impressive skills propelled him to score nine league goals and one cup goal the following season, contributing to Burnley's triumphant Division Four championship. However, a league goal was wiped off due to Aldershot Town's departure from the league. Despite this setback, Lancashire's time on the pitch dwindled, as he only made four more appearances for Burnley.

In a bid to gain more playing time, Lancashire embarked on loan stints. He had a captivating temporary spell at Chester City FC in the closing stages of the following season, where he became a hero. With seven goals in just 11 appearances, he played a pivotal role in securing promotion for the Blues. One of his memorable moments included a dramatic last-minute winner against promotion rivals Preston North End in April 1994. Lancashire's outstanding performance caught the attention of Burnley, and he was recalled just before the season's end. Although he didn't feature in the play-off final, he celebrated their victory over Stockport County at Wembley Stadium as an unused substitute.

In December 1994, Lancashire made a £55,000 move to Preston North End FC. Unfortunately, his time there was short-lived, as he only managed six appearances during their successful Division Three title-winning campaign. In April 1996, he found himself transferred to Wigan Athletic FC for £35,000 after a productive loan spell that saw him score three goals in four games. However, fate dealt him a cruel blow when he suffered a knee injury in his first match for Wigan against Lincoln City. Miraculously, he recovered in time for the following season, defying the odds to contribute nine goals to Wigan's championship-winning campaign in Division Three. Lancashire formed a formidable partnership with the prolific Graeme Jones. Despite his contributions, Lancashire faced limited opportunities after promotion, leading him to join Rochdale FC in October 1997 for £40,000. Unfortunately, he battled numerous soft tissue injuries during his four-year stint at Spotland, hindering his ability to secure a regular spot in the team. Lancashire's time at Rochdale concluded at the end of the 2000-01 season, marking the end of his professional career. He subsequently transitioned to non-league football, joining Hednesford Town FC.

Since retiring from playing, Lancashire has remained involved in the world of football. He has organized football-related events for the organization SpeedMark. He was also Academy Operations Manager at Burnley FC from 2012 to 2016. After a short hiatus from football, he joined Mark Fell at Ramsbottom United as his assistant and followed him to Lancaster City FC in October 2018. Lancashire was the Assistant Manager at Workington AFC still working alongside Fell. Outside of football he is a Lottery Manager for Lottery Solutions .

== Honours ==
Burnley

- Football League Fourth Division: 1991–92

Wigan Athletic

- Football League Third Division: 1996–97

== Sources ==
- Sumner, Chas (1997). On the Borderline: The Official History of Chester City F.C. 1885-1997. Yore Publications. ISBN 1-874427-52-6.
