= Tepi Moilanen =

Finnish footballer (born 1973)

Teuvo Moilanen
Personal information
- Full name: Teuvo Johannes Moilanen
- Date of birth: 12 December 1973 (age 52)
- Place of birth: Oulu, Finland
- Height: 1.97 m (6 ft 6 in)
- Position: Goalkeeper

Youth career
- Ilves

Senior career*
Years	Team	Apps	(Gls)
1990–1994	Ilves	63	(0)
1993	→ PP-70 (loan)	3	(0)
1995	Jaro	25	(0)
1995–2003	Preston North End	159	(0)
1996	→ Darlington (loan)	16	(0)
1997	→ Scarborough (loan)	4	(0)
2003	→ Hearts (loan)	14	(0)
2003–2005	Hearts	9	(0)
2005	KooTeePee	14	(0)
2006	Tampere United	0	(0)
2006	→ Hämeenlinna (loan)	4	(0)

International career
1997–2003	Finland	4	(0)
- * Club domestic league appearances and goals

Teuvo Johannes Moilanen (born 12 December 1973), also known as Tepi Moilanen, is a Finnish former professional footballer who played as a goalkeeper. He has represented Ilves, FF Jaro and FC KooTeePee in the Finnish top division Veikkausliiga. His later clubs include Preston North End and Heart of Midlothian F.C. and brief loan spells in Scarborough F.C. and Darlington F.C. Teuvo was selected as the Preston North End Player of the Year Award Winner after season 1997–98. In 2006, he was playing for Tampere United and had a loan spell at FC Hämeenlinna.

== Career statistics ==
=== Club ===
As of 26 August 2024.

Appearances and goals by club, season and competition
Club	Season	League			Cup (Note: Includes FA Cup and Scottish Cup)		League cup (Note: Includes EFL League Cup and Scottish League Cup)		Europe		Total	
Club	Season	Division	Apps	Goals	Apps	Goals	Apps	Goals	Apps	Goals	Apps	Goals
Ilves	1990	Veikkausliiga	3	0	–		–		–		3	0
Ilves	1991	Veikkausliiga	7	0	–		–		2 (Note: Appearances in UEFA Cup Winner's Cup)	0	9	0
Ilves	1992	Veikkausliiga	29	0	–		–		–		29	0
Ilves	1993	Veikkausliiga	5	0	–		–		–		5	0
Ilves	1994	Veikkausliiga	19	0	–		–		–		19	0
Ilves	Total		63	0	0	0	0	0	2	0	65	0
PP-70 (loan)	1993	Kakkonen	3	0	–		–		–		3	0
Jaro	1995	Veikkausliiga	26	0	–		–		–		26	0
Preston North End	1995–96	Third Division	2	0	–		–		–		2	0
Preston North End	1996–97	Second Division	4	0	–		–		–		4	0
Preston North End	1997–98	Second Division	40	0	–		–		–		40	0
Preston North End	1998–99	Second Division	16	0	–		–		–		16	0
Preston North End	1999–00	Second Division	41	0	3	0	4	0	–		48	0
Preston North End	2000–01	First Division	17	0	–		–		–		17	0
Preston North End	2001–02	First Division	24	0	2	0	1	0	–		27	0
Preston North End	2002–03	First Division	15	0	0	0	2	0	–		17	0
Preston North End	Total		159	0	5	0	7	0	0	0	171	0
Darlington (loan)	1996–97	Third Division	16	0	–		–		–		16	0
Scarborough (loan)	1996–97	Third Division	4	0	–		–		–		4	0
Hearts (loan)	2002–03	Scottish Premier League	14	0	0	0	1	0	–		15	0
Hearts	2003–04	Scottish Premier League	9	0	0	0	0	0	2 (Note: Appearances in UEFA Cup)	0	11	0
Hearts	2004–05	Scottish Premier League	0	0	0	0	0	0	0	0	0	0
Hearts	Total		9	0	0	0	0	0	2	0	11	0
KooTeePee	2005	Veikkausliiga	14	0	–		–		–		14	0
Tampere United	2006	Veikkausliiga	0	0	0	0	–		0	0	0	0
Hämeenlinna (loan)	2006	Ykkönen	4	0	–		–		–		4	0
Career total			312	0	5	0	8	0	4	0	329	0

=== International ===
As of match played 21 March 2024

Finland
Year	Apps	Goals
1997	2	0
1998	0	0
1999	0	0
2000	1	0
2001	0	0
2002	0	0
2003	1	0
Total	4	0

== Honours ==
Preston North End

- Football League Second Division: 1999–2000
