= Michael Holt (English footballer) =

English footballer

Personal information
- Date of birth: 28 July 1977 (age 49)
- Place of birth: Barnoldswick, England
- Position: Striker

Team information
- Current team: Barnoldswick Town

Senior career*
Years	Team	Apps	(Gls)
1995–1996	Blackburn Rovers	0	(0)
1996–1999	Preston North End	36	(5)
1998	→ Macclesfield Town (loan)	4	(1)
1998–1999	→ Rochdale (loan)	6	(3)
1999–2000	Rochdale	30	(4)
2000	→ Northwich Victoria (loan)	5	(0)
2000–2003	St Patrick's Athletic	-	(-)
2003–2004	Derry City	-	(-)
2004–2005	St Patrick's Athletic	-	(-)
2005	Dublin City	-	(-)
2005–2006	Nelson	-	(-)
2006	Barnoldswick Town	-	(-)
- * Club domestic league appearances and goals as of 22 April 2007

Michael Holt (born 28 July 1977) is a footballer who last played for West Lancashire Football League side Barnoldswick Town. He played as a striker.

He previously played in The Football League for Blackburn Rovers, Preston North End, Macclesfield Town and Rochdale and in non-league football with Northwich Victoria and Nelson. He also had a five-year spell in Ireland with League of Ireland sides St Patrick's Athletic and Derry City.

In the 2005–06 season, he scored 36 goals in all competitions for Nelson, helping them to win promotion to the North West Counties Football League Division One. However, in August 2006, he decided to leave the Blues to join his hometown club, Barnoldswick Town. He is reported to have joined Barnoldswick whilst the then Nelson manager, Graham Haworth, was on holiday.
