= Mickey Brown =

English footballer

Personal information
- Full name: Michael Anthony Brown
- Date of birth: 8 February 1968 (age 58)
- Place of birth: Birmingham, England
- Height: 5 ft 9 in (1.75 m)

Senior career*
Years	Team	Apps	(Gls)
1986–1991	Shrewsbury Town	190	(9)
1991–1992	Bolton Wanderers	33	(3)
1992–1994	Shrewsbury Town	67	(11)
1994–1997	Preston North End	16	(1)
1996	→ Rochdale (loan)	5	(0)
1996–1997	→ Shrewsbury Town (loan)	5	(0)
1997–2001	Shrewsbury Town	156	(16)
2001–2002	Boston United	26	(1)
2002–2003	Chester City	23	(0)
2003–2004	Nuneaton Borough		
2004–2007	Newtown	35	(5)
2007–2009	Shawbury United		
Total		556	(46)
- * Club domestic league appearances and goals

Michael Anthony Brown (born 8 February 1968) is an English former professional footballer. Born in Birmingham, Brown played for several clubs, including Shrewsbury Town, Bolton Wanderers and Preston North End.

== Career ==
Brown was probably most well known for playing for Shrewsbury Town during the late 80's and 90's, in which during this period he joined the club three times. His most famous moment at the club is most likely scoring the goal which kept Shrewsbury in the Football League in May 2000. He is also the record league appearance holder at Shrewsbury, with 418 appearances spread out over his three periods as a Town player. He first joined the club as an apprentice before breaking into the first team a year later. He then made 174 league starts before joining Bolton Wanderers in 1991. He then returned to Shrewsbury a year after in 1992, playing until 1994, and then leaving for Preston North End. He then returned yet again in 1996, and this time spent 5 years at Shrewsbury until 2001, during which time he made himself a fans favourite after scoring the crucial goal in Shrewsbury's bid to stay in the Football League during 1999–2000 season. It was after he left Shrewsbury for the final time that his career took him to many other lower division clubs, the likes of Rochdale, Boston United (where he won a Football Conference winners medal in 2002), Nuneaton Borough and Chester City (the club who had been relegated thanks to his Shrewsbury heroics in 2000) signed him, but he only stayed at each club for a short period.

In September 2007 Mickey Brown joined West Midlands (Regional) League Premier Division side Shawbury United from Newtown. He has since left the club.

In June 2009 he joined Shrewsbury Town F.C as part-time fitness coach.

Mickey has been "knighted" by many fans for his endeavours on the pitch in particular his performance against Exeter City in the last match of the 1999–2000 season. Many fans refer to him as "Sir" Mickey Brown for this alone. The fans often sing "Mickey Brown sent Chester Down" to the tune of Go West as tribute to the club's Great Escape.

== Honours ==
Shrewsbury Town

- Football League Third Division: 1993–94

Boston United

- Football Conference: 2001–02

Individual

- Shrewsbury Town Football League record appearance holder: 418 appearances
