= Paul Sparrow =

English footballer

Personal information
- Date of birth: 24 March 1975 (age 51)
- Place of birth: Wandsworth, Greater London, England
- Height: 6 ft 0 in (1.83 m)
- Position: Defender

Youth career
- ????–1993: Crystal Palace

Senior career*
Years	Team	Apps	(Gls)
1993–1996	Crystal Palace	1	(0)
1996–1998	Preston North End	20	(0)
1998–1999	Rochdale	25	(2)
1999–2005	Lancaster City		
2005–????	Stalybridge Celtic		
- Kendal Town
- Chorley
- * Club domestic league appearances and goals

Paul Sparrow (born 24 March 1975) is an English, retired professional footballer who played in the Football League for Crystal Palace, Preston North End and Rochdale, as a defender. He also played non-league football for Lancaster City, Stalybridge Celtic, Kendal Town and Chorley.

== Playing career ==
Sparrow began his youth career at Crystal Palace and subsequently signed professional terms. He made his professional debut on 8 November 1995, as a substitute in an away 0–2 defeat to Middlesbrough in a League Cup replay. After one further appearance in the Football League, Sparrow moved to Preston North End, in March 1996. At Preston, Sparrow made 20 league appearances over the next two seasons, without scoring, before moving to Rochdale in 1998. At Rochdale, he made 25 appearances, scoring twice, before moving to Lancaster City in 1999. He spent six seasons at Lancaster and, when he left in 2005, was the club's longest serving player at the time.

== Post-retirement ==
After retiring from football, Sparrow completed the London Marathon. As of December 2009, he was known to be working with the coaching team at Myerscough College. Since finishing in football, Sparrow qualified as a physiotherapist and has established a successful practice in Ewell, Surrey.

== Honours ==
Preston North End

- Football League Third Division: 1995–96
