= 1987–88 Colchester United F.C. season =

Colchester United
1987–88 season
- Chairman: Jonathan Crisp
- Manager: Mike Walker (until 1 November); Steve Foley (caretaker) (1 November until 6 November); Roger Brown (from 6 November)
- Stadium: Layer Road
- Fourth Division: 9th
- FA Cup: 3rd round (eliminated by Plymouth Argyle)
- League Cup: 1st round (eliminated by Fulham)
- Associate Members' Cup: Quarter-finals (southern section) (eliminated by Notts County)
- Top goalscorer: League: Dale Tempest (11); All: Dale Tempest (14)
- Highest home attendance: 3,215 v Tamworth, 14 November 1987
- Lowest home attendance: 912 v Peterborough United, 13 October 1987
- Average home league attendance: 1,776
- Biggest win: 4–1 v Peterborough United, 12 September 1987 v Rochdale, 3 November 1987; 3–0 v Bolton Wanderers, 11 December 1987
- Biggest defeat: 0–4 v Carlisle United, 23 April 1988 v Bolton Wanderers, 2 May 1988
Home colours

The 1987–88 season was Colchester United's 46th season in their history and seventh consecutive season in fourth tier of English football, the Fourth Division. Alongside competing in the Fourth Division, the club also participated in the FA Cup, the League Cup and the Associate Members' Cup.

After a promising start to the season under Mike Walker, a disagreement between him and chairman Jonathan Crisp saw Walker leave Layer Road and in his place Roger Brown was recruited. From joint top of the table, Brown's side won just five games in the second half of the season to finish the season ninth.

Colchester reached the third round of the FA Cup, beating Tamworth and Hereford United before elimination by Plymouth Argyle. In the Associate Members' Cup, Colchester reached the southern section quarter-final, where they were defeated 3–2 by Notts County. The club were less successful in the League Cup as they fell to a 5–1 aggregate defeat to Fulham.

== Season overview ==
Keen to improve on last years play-off disappointment, manager Mike Walker recruited former U's boss Allan Hunter as his coach.

Club regulars Tony Adcock and Alec Chamberlain both left the club during the summer of 1987 in big money moves. Adcock signed for Second Division Manchester City for £75,000, while Chamberlain joined First Division Everton for £80,000 as understudy to Neville Southall. Walker then broke the club transfer record to bring in striker Dale Tempest for £40,000.

Chairman Jonathan Crisp announced that, in light of worsening football hooliganism across the nation, a 100% members-only scheme would be in place for the new season, banning away fans from attending matches at Layer Road. To deflect any negative attention, he also leaked details regarding a new stadium at Turner Rise while introducing developers Norcross Estates as shirt sponsors.

Owing to the new scheme, only 1,300 members attended the first fixture of the season, a drop of 1,400 on last seasons average attendance. A new record low crowd was set on 29 September when just 1,140 watched the 2–1 win over Swansea City.

Having rebuilt his side and winning seven out of eight games, Walker was abruptly sacked by Crisp while the U's were joint-top of the Fourth Division table. Crisp had claimed that Walker had resigned, but alleged personal differences were said to have been the cause. Bizarrely, Walker won the Manager of the Month award after he had been sacked.

Incoming as new manage was Roger Brown, formerly manager of Poole Town while working as a factory manager. He had been recommended to Crisp by his advisors, but he took the U's from top spot on New Year's Day to ninth at the end of the season after earning just five wins from January until May.

Crisp had to concede his membership scheme in November after hundreds of Wolverhampton Wanderers fans registered as members to boost the Layer Road attendance to an unusually high figure of 2,413 for that season. Crisp claimed the scheme had only been an experiment, and this was reflected in the season average of just 1,776.

Following on from his Turner Rise leaked plans, Crisp considered selling Layer Road and ground sharing Portman Road with Ipswich Town while the new stadium was built. His decision however was swayed by a group of former club directors. By selling up, Crisp would have recouped his outlay, but when the stadium plans were delayed over land ownership, Colchester United would have been left completely homeless with no assets except for the players.

== Players ==
As of match played 6 May 1988.

Name	Position	Nationality	Place of birth	Date of birth	Apps	Goals	Signed from	Date signed	Fee
Goalkeepers
Mark Walton	GK	(Wales)	Merthyr Tydfil	1 June 1969 (aged 18)	8	0	(England) Luton Town	26 December 1987 (Note: Date of signing refers to the date of the player's first game in his third spell for the club)	£17,500
Defenders
Scott Daniels	CB	(England)	South Benfleet	22 November 1969 (aged 17)	0	0	Apprentice	23 April 1988 (Note: Date of signing refers to the date of the player's first game for the club)	Free transfer
Tony English	DF/MF	(England)	Luton	19 October 1966 (aged 20)	115	21	(England) Coventry City	24 December 1984	Free transfer
Stephen Grenfell	FB	(England)	Enfield Town	27 October 1966 (aged 20)	30	2	(England) Tottenham Hotspur	28 November 1986 (Note: Date of signing refers to the date of the player's first game in his second spell for the club)	£15,000
Rudi Hedman	CB	(England)	Lambeth	16 November 1964 (aged 22)	138	10	Apprentice	February 1984	Free transfer
Steve Hetzke	CB	(England)	Marlborough	3 June 1955 (aged 31)	0	0	(England) Chester City	March 1988	£10,000
Stuart Hicks	CB	(England)	Peterborough	30 May 1967 (aged 20)	0	0	(England) Wisbech Town	March 1988	Free transfer
Colin Hill	CB	(Northern Ireland)	(England) Uxbridge	12 November 1963 (aged 23)	0	0	(Portugal) Marítimo	30 October 1987	Undisclosed
John Ray	CB	(England)	Newmarket	21 November 1968 (aged 18)	0	0	Apprentice	Summer 1987	Free transfer
Midfielders
Nick Chatterton	MF	(England)	West Norwood	18 May 1954 (aged 33)	22	1	(England) Millwall	September 1986	Undisclosed
Mark Radford	MF	(England)	Leicester	20 December 1968 (aged 18)	1	0	Apprentice	26 January 1987	Free transfer
Gary Smith	MF	(England)	Harlow	3 December 1968 (aged 18)	0	0	(England) Fulham	September 1987	Non-contract
Richard Wilkins	MF/DF	(England)	Lambeth	28 May 1965 (aged 22)	30	4	(England) Haverhill Rovers	18 November 1986	Undisclosed
Keith Williams	MF	(England)	Burntwood	12 April 1967 (aged 20)	0	0	(England) Bath City	December 1987	Free transfer
Forwards
Lee Hunter	WG	(England)	Oldham	5 October 1969 (aged 17)	0	0	Apprentice	6 May 1988	Free transfer
Tommy Keane	WG	(Republic of Ireland)	Galway	16 September 1968 (aged 18)	0	0	(England) AFC Bournemouth	December 1987	£10,000
Dale Tempest	FW	(Hong Kong)	(England) Leeds	30 December 1963 (aged 23)	0	0	(Belgium) Lokeren	28 August 1987	£40,000
Mario Walsh	FW	(England)	Paddington	19 January 1966 (aged 21)	0	0	(England) Torquay United	Summer 1987	£15,000
Winston White	WG	(England)	Leicester	26 October 1958 (aged 28)	16	1	(England) Bury	February 1987	Free transfer

== Transfers ==
=== In ===
Date	Position	Nationality	Name	From	Fee	Ref.
Summer 1987	CB	(England)	John Ray	Apprentice	Free transfer	
Summer 1987	FW	(England)	Mario Walsh	(England) Torquay United	£15,000	
18 August 1987	GK	(England)	Trevor Lake	(England) West Ham United	Undisclosed	(Note: Date of signing refers to the date of the player's first game for the club)
28 August 1987	FW	(Hong Kong)	Dale Tempest	(Belgium) Lokeren	£40,000	
September 1987	MF	(England)	Gary Smith	(England) Fulham	Non-contract	
30 October 1987	CB	(Northern Ireland)	Colin Hill	(Portugal) Marítimo	Undisclosed	
December 1987	WG	(Republic of Ireland)	Tommy Keane	(England) AFC Bournemouth	£10,000	
December 1987	MF	(England)	Keith Williams	(England) Bath City	Free transfer	
26 December 1987	GK	(Wales)	Mark Walton	(England) Luton Town	£17,500	(Note: Date of signing refers to the date of the player's first game in his third spell for the club)
March 1988	CB	(England)	Steve Hetzke	(England) Chester City	£10,000	
March 1988	CB	(England)	Stuart Hicks	(England) Wisbech Town	Free transfer	
23 April 1988	CB	(England)	Scott Daniels	Apprentice	Free transfer	
6 May 1988	WG	(England)	Lee Hunter	Apprentice	Free transfer	

- Total spending: ▼ ~ £92,500

=== Out ===
Date	Position	Nationality	Name	To	Fee	Ref.
End of season	FB	(Scotland)	Ian Phillips	(England) Aldershot	Undisclosed	
End of season	WG/MF	(England)	Simon Burman	(England) Weymouth	Undisclosed	
Summer 1987	GK	(England)	Alec Chamberlain	(England) Everton	£80,000	
Summer 1987	MF/FB	(England)	Andy Farrell	(England) Burnley	£5,000	
Summer 1987	CB	(England)	Kirk Game	(England) Dartford	Released	
June 1987	FW	(England)	Tony Adcock	(England) Manchester City	£75,000	
July 1987	CB	(England)	Keith Day	(England) Leyton Orient	Undisclosed	
18 August 1987	GK	(England)	Trevor Lake	Free agent	Retired	(Note: Date of departure refers to the date of the player's final game for the club)
13 October 1987	MF	(England)	Sean Norman	(England) Wycombe Wanderers	Undisclosed	
5 December 1987	FW	(England)	Simon Lowe	(England) Scarborough	Undisclosed	
Early 1988	FB	(England)	Scott Young	(England) Wycombe Wanderers	£5,000	
2 January 1988	FB	(England)	Terry Baker	(England) Billericay Town	Released	
15 April 1988	FB	(England)	Paul Hinshelwood	(England) Dartford	Undisclosed	
2 May 1988	MF	(England)	John Reeves	(England) Enfield	Released	

- Total incoming: ▲ ~ £165,000

=== Loans in ===
Date	Position	Nationality	Name	From	End date	Ref.
Summer 1987	GK	(Wales)	Graham Benstead	(England) Norwich City	24 November 1987	(Note: Loan end date refers to the date of the player's final game for the club)
August 1987	GK	(Wales)	Mark Walton	(England) Luton Town	13 October 1987	(Note: Loan end date refers to the date of the player's final game in his first spell for the club)
14 November 1987	GK	(Wales)	Mark Walton	(England) Luton Town	18 December 1987	(Note: Loan start and end dates refer to the date of the player's first and final games in his second spell for the club)
December 1987	CB	(England)	Darren Angell	(England) Portsmouth	18 December 1987	
February 1988	GK	(Canada)	Craig Forrest	(England) Ipswich Town	29 April 1988	
February 1988	CB	(England)	Glenn Keeley	(England) Oldham Athletic	26 February 1988	
19 February 1988	FB	(England)	David Coleman	(England) AFC Bournemouth	19 March 1988	(Note: Loan start and end dates refer to the date of the player's first and final games for the club)
25 March 1988	FW	(England)	Sean Farrell	(England) Luton Town	6 May 1988	

=== Loans out ===
Date	Position	Nationality	Name	To	End date	Ref.
	CB	(England)	John Ray	(England) Wycombe Wanderers		
	FB	(England)	Scott Young	(England) Wycombe Wanderers		

== Match details ==
=== Fourth Division ===
==== Results round by round ====
Round	1	2	3	4	5	6	7	8	9	10	11	12	13	14	15	16	17	18	19	20	21	22	23	24	25	26	27	28	29	30	31	32	33	34	35	36	37	38	39	40	41	42	43	44	45	46
Ground	A	H	A	H	A	H	A	A	H	H	A	H	A	H	A	H	A	A	H	A	H	A	A	H	H	A	H	A	H	A	H	H	A	H	A	A	H	H	A	H	A	H	A	H	A	H
Result	W	L	D	L	D	W	L	L	L	W	W	D	W	W	W	W	W	W	L	D	W	W	W	W	L	L	D	L	L	L	L	D	W	L	D	L	D	W	L	W	D	W	L	W	L	D
Position	2	5	9	16	15	9	14	19	19	18	17	13	15	12	9	3	5	1	5	2	2	1	1	1	2	3	2	4	4	6	7	10	8	9	12	12	11	11	13	10	12	8	10	7	10	9

Source: 11v11.com
A = Away; H = Home; W = Win; D = Draw; L = Loss

==== League table ====
Pos	Team	Pld	W	D	L	GF	GA	GD	Pts
7	Peterborough United	46	20	10	16	52	53	−1	70
8	Leyton Orient	46	19	12	15	85	63	+22	69
9	Colchester United	46	19	10	17	47	51	−4	67
10	Burnley	46	20	7	19	57	62	−5	67
11	Wrexham	46	20	6	20	69	58	+11	66

==== Matches ====
15 August 1987 1	Burnley	0–3	Colchester United	Burnley
		Report	Walsh 25'; English 27'; Lowe 75'	Stadium: Turf Moor; Attendance: 5,369; Referee: J Penrose

21 August 1987 2	Colchester United	0–1	Torquay United	Colchester
19:30 BST		Report	Dobson 66'	Stadium: Layer Road; Attendance: 1,372; Referee: Martin Bodenham

29 August 1987 3	Scunthorpe United	2–2	Colchester United	Scunthorpe
	Johnson 23'; Flounders 65'	Report	Wilkins 61'; White 83'	Stadium: Old Showground; Attendance: 2,003

31 August 1987 4	Colchester United	1–3	Scarborough	Colchester
15:00 BST	Tempest 18'	Report	Thompson 68' (pen.); Mell 70'; Moss 72'	Stadium: Layer Road; Attendance: 1,525; Referee: Tony Ward

4 September 1987 5	Crewe Alexandra	0–0	Colchester United	Crewe
		Report		Stadium: Gresty Road; Attendance: 1,843; Referee: G Aplin

12 September 1987 6	Colchester United	4–1	Peterborough United	Colchester
15:00 BST	White 35'; Tempest 51'; Chatterton 74' (pen.); Walsh 83'	Report	Lawrence 54'	Stadium: Layer Road; Attendance: 1,164; Referee: R Wiseman

16 September 1987 7	Hereford United	1–0	Colchester United	Hereford
	Stant 90'	Report		Stadium: Edgar Street; Attendance: 1,951; Referee: Gerald Ashby

19 September 1987 8	Hartlepool United	3–1	Colchester United	Hartlepool
	Baker 41' (pen.), 51', 80' (pen.)	Report	Hinshelwood 71'	Stadium: Victoria Park; Attendance: 1,698; Referee: I Hendrick

25 September 1987 9	Colchester United	0–2	Exeter City	Colchester
19:30 BST		Report	Batty 32'; Edwards 58'	Stadium: Layer Road; Attendance: 1,443; Referee: Alf Buksh

29 September 1987 10	Colchester United	2–1	Swansea City	Colchester
	Tempest 3'; Hinshelwood 47'	Report	Raynor 90' (pen.)	Stadium: Layer Road; Attendance: 1,140; Referee: Rob Lewis

3 October 1987 11	Newport County	1–2	Colchester United	Newport
	Thompson 87'	Report	Wilkins 22'; Chatterton 51'	Stadium: Somerton Park; Attendance: 1,200; Referee: N Butler

9 October 1987 12	Colchester United	0–0	Leyton Orient	Colchester
19:30 BST		Report		Stadium: Layer Road; Attendance: 1,665; Referee: M James

17 October 1987 13	Wrexham	0–1	Colchester United	Wrexham
		Report	Reeves 26'	Stadium: Racecourse Ground; Attendance: 1,493; Referee: P Harrison

20 October 1987 14	Colchester United	1–0	Carlisle United	Colchester
	Tempest 75'	Report		Stadium: Layer Road; Attendance: 1,328; Referee: D Reeves

24 October 1987 15	Cambridge United	0–1	Colchester United	Cambridge
		Report	Chatterton 64' (pen.)	Stadium: Abbey Stadium; Attendance: 2,450; Referee: David Phillips

30 October 1987 16	Colchester United	2–1	Darlington	Colchester
19:30 GMT	Wilkins 56'; Chatterton 68'	Report	Worthington 87'; Phil Bonnyman (red card)	Stadium: Layer Road; Attendance: 1,659; Referee: I Hemley

3 November 1987 17	Rochdale	1–4	Colchester United	Rochdale
	Simmonds 45'	Report	Wilkins 34', 42'; Chatterton 58' (pen.); Hinshelwood 72'	Stadium: Spotland Stadium; Attendance: 1,399; Referee: Keith Hackett

6 November 1987 18	Halifax Town	1–2	Colchester United	Halifax
	Galloway 42'	Report	Wilkins 14'; Chatterton 83' (pen.)	Stadium: The Shay; Attendance: 1,432; Referee: M Dimblebee

21 November 1987 19	Colchester United	0–1	Wolverhampton Wanderers	Colchester
15:00 GMT	Reeves (red card) 65'	Report	Thompson 76' (pen.); Bull (red card) 65'	Stadium: Layer Road; Attendance: 2,413; Referee: M Bailey

27 November 1987 20	Stockport County	1–1	Colchester United	Stockport
	Farnaby 43'	Report	Chatterton 50'	Stadium: Edgeley Park; Attendance: 1,703; Referee: John Lloyd

11 December 1987 21	Colchester United	3–0	Bolton Wanderers	Colchester
19:30 GMT	Wilkins 29'; White 68', 81'	Report		Stadium: Layer Road; Attendance: 1,725; Referee: Brian Hill

18 December 1987 22	Tranmere Rovers	0–2	Colchester United	Birkenhead
		Report	White 45', 70'	Stadium: Prenton Park; Attendance: 2,642; Referee: F Roberts

26 December 1987 23	Exeter City	0–2	Colchester United	Exeter
		Report	Wilkins 62'; Tempest 75'	Stadium: St James Park; Attendance: 2,675; Referee: Roger Gifford

28 December 1987 24	Colchester United	2–1	Cardiff City	Colchester
19:30 GMT	Tempest 40'; English 75'	Report	Kelly 24'	Stadium: Layer Road; Attendance: 2,599; Referee: Phil Don

1 January 1988 25	Colchester United	0–3	Scunthorpe United	Colchester
		Report	Daws 53', 77'; Lister 61'	Stadium: Layer Road; Attendance: 2,287; Referee: David Allison

2 January 1988 26	Peterborough United	2–0	Colchester United	Peterborough
	White 56'; Luke 81'	Report		Stadium: London Road Stadium; Attendance: 3,666; Referee: N Butler

15 January 1988 27	Colchester United	0–0	Hartlepool United	Colchester
19:30 GMT		Report		Stadium: Layer Road; Attendance: 1,768; Referee: Tony Ward

30 January 1988 28	Scarborough	3–1	Colchester United	Scarborough
	Graham 47'; Cook 56', 64' (pen.); Russell (red card)	Report	Hinshelwood 84' (pen.)	Stadium: Athletic Ground; Attendance: 2,155; Referee: A Robinson

5 February 1988 29	Colchester United	1–4	Crewe Alexandra	Colchester
19:30 GMT	Tempest 47'	Report	Goulet 15', 62'; Fishenden 22'; English 88' (o.g.)	Stadium: Layer Road; Attendance: 1,822; Referee: J Moules

13 February 1988 30	Cardiff City	1–0	Colchester United	Cardiff
	Ford 49'	Report		Stadium: Ninian Park; Attendance: 5,458; Referee: David Hutchinson

19 February 1988 31	Colchester United	0–1	Burnley	Colchester
19:30 GMT		Report	Reeves 32'	Stadium: Layer Road; Attendance: 2,520; Referee: Rob Lewis

26 February 1988 32	Colchester United	0–0	Newport County	Colchester
19:30 GMT	White (red card) 86'	Report		Stadium: Layer Road; Attendance: 1,784; Referee: Keren Barratt

1 March 1988 33	Swansea City	1–2	Colchester United	Swansea
	Love 90'	Report	Tempest 63'; White 74'	Stadium: Vetch Field; Attendance: 4,011; Referee: B Stevens

4 March 1988 34	Colchester United	1–2	Wrexham	Colchester
19:30 GMT	Coleman 18'	Report	Buxton 7' (red card); Carter 38'	Stadium: Layer Road; Attendance: 1,797; Referee: Alf Buksh

12 March 1988 35	Leyton Orient	0–0	Colchester United	Leyton
		Report		Stadium: Brisbane Road; Attendance: 3,125; Referee: Howard King

19 March 1988 36	Darlington	2–0	Colchester United	Darlington
	Bonnyman 60'; MacDonald 79'	Report		Stadium: Feethams; Attendance: 2,034; Referee: J Ireland

25 March 1988 37	Colchester United	0–0	Cambridge United	Colchester
19:30 GMT		Report		Stadium: Layer Road; Attendance: 2,146; Referee: Phil Don

1 April 1988 38	Colchester United	2–1	Halifax Town	Colchester
19:30 BST	Hinshelwood 62'; Farrell 80'	Report	Matthews 12'	Stadium: Layer Road; Attendance: 1,992; Referee: Keith Cooper

4 April 1988 39	Wolverhampton Wanderers	2–0	Colchester United	Wolverhampton
	Bull 10', 75'	Report		Stadium: Molineux Stadium; Attendance: 13,433; Referee: R Walmsley

8 April 1988 40	Colchester United	1–0	Rochdale	Colchester
19:30 BST	Tempest 51'	Report		Stadium: Layer Road; Attendance: 1,864

15 April 1988 41	Torquay United	0–0	Colchester United	Torquay
		Report		Stadium: Plainmoor; Attendance: 3,508; Referee: Keith Cooper

19 April 1988 42	Colchester United	1–0	Hereford United	Colchester
19:30 BST	Tempest 55'	Report		Stadium: Layer Road; Attendance: 1,367; Referee: M Dimblebee

23 April 1988 43	Carlisle United	4–0	Colchester United	Carlisle
	Fyfe 11', 90'; Saddington 20'; Halpin 80'	Report		Stadium: Brunton Park; Attendance: 1,496; Referee: George Courtney

29 April 1988 44	Colchester United	2–0	Stockport County	Colchester
19:30 BST	Tempest 59'; Wilkins 60'	Report		Stadium: Layer Road; Attendance: 1,607; Referee: Alan Gunn

2 May 1988 45	Bolton Wanderers	4–0	Colchester United	Bolton
	Savage 6'; Thomas 37'; Came 57'; Chandler 82'	Report		Stadium: Burden Park; Attendance: 5,540; Referee: T Simpson

6 May 1988 46	Colchester United	0–0	Tranmere Rovers	Colchester
19:30 BST		Report		Stadium: Layer Road; Attendance: 1,704; Referee: David Elleray

=== League Cup ===
18 August 1987 1st round 1st leg	Fulham	3–1	Colchester United	Fulham
	Davies 49'; Marshall 68'; Rosenior 70'	Report	White 45'	Stadium: Craven Cottage; Attendance: 2,782; Referee: B Stevens

25 August 1987 1st round 2nd leg	Colchester United	0–2	Fulham	Colchester
		Report	Barnett 48' (pen.); Davies 59'	Stadium: Layer Road; Attendance: 1,554; Referee: Kelvin Morton
Note: Fulham won 5–1 on aggregate.

=== Associate Members' Cup ===
Group 4
Team	Pld	W	D	L	GF	GA	GD	Pts
Colchester United	2	1	1	0	3	2	+1	4
Peterborough	2	1	0	1	5	3	+2	3
Cambridge United	2	0	1	1	0	3	−3	1

13 October 1987 Preliminary round (southern section)	Colchester United	3–2	Peterborough United	Colchester
19:30 BST	Tempest 3', 52'; Norman 35'	Report	Nuttell 70'; Gooding 84'; Halsall (red card) 90'	Stadium: Layer Road; Attendance: 912; Referee: Kelvin Morton

24 November 1987 Preliminary round (southern section)	Cambridge United	0–0	Colchester United	Cambridge
		Report		Stadium: Abbey Stadium; Attendance: 857; Referee: D Vickers

19 January 1988 1st round (southern section)	Colchester United	1–1 (a.e.t.) (6–5 p)	Leyton Orient	Colchester
19:30 GMT	White 26'	Report	Juryeff 18'	Stadium: Layer Road; Attendance: 1,351; Referee: D Hedges

9 February 1988 Quarter-final (southern section)	Colchester United	2–3	Notts County	Colchester
19:30 GMT	White 51', 59'	Report	McParland 2'; Thorpe 60'; Lund 71'	Stadium: Layer Road; Attendance: 1,564; Referee: J Martin

=== FA Cup ===
14 November 1987 1st round	Colchester United	3–0	Tamworth	Colchester
	Wilkins 55'; Tempest 56'; Chatterton 87' (pen.)	Report		Stadium: Layer Road; Attendance: 3,215; Referee: J Ashworth

5 December 1987 2nd round	Colchester United	3–2	Hereford United	Colchester
15:00 GMT	Chatterton 2' (pen.); Wilkins 37'; Hill 76'	Report	Stant 9'; Phillips 89'	Stadium: Layer Road; Attendance: 2,216; Referee: Alan Gunn

11 January 1988 3rd round	Plymouth Argyle	2–0	Colchester United	Plymouth
	Cooper 41'; Matthews 44'	Report		Stadium: Home Park; Attendance: 10,351; Referee: I Hemley

== Squad statistics ==
=== Appearances and goals ===
No.	Pos	Nat	Player	Total		Fourth Division		FA Cup		League Cup		Football League Trophy	
No.	Pos	Nat	Player	Apps	Goals	Apps	Goals	Apps	Goals	Apps	Goals	Apps	Goals
	GK	(Wales) WAL	Mark Walton	24	0	17	0	3	0	1	0	3	0
	DF	(England) ENG	Scott Daniels	1	0	0+1	0	0	0	0	0	0	0
	DF	(England) ENG	Tony English	51	2	43	2	3	0	2	0	3	0
	DF	(England) ENG	Stephen Grenfell	49	0	39+2	0	3	0	0+1	0	4	0
	DF	(England) ENG	Rudi Hedman	51	0	41+1	0	3	0	2	0	4	0
	DF	(England) ENG	Steve Hetzke	5	0	5	0	0	0	0	0	0	0
	DF	(England) ENG	Stuart Hicks	7	0	7	0	0	0	0	0	0	0
	DF	(Northern Ireland) NIR	Colin Hill	30	1	22+3	0	2	1	0	0	2+1	0
	DF	(England) ENG	John Ray	1	0	0+1	0	0	0	0	0	0	0
	MF	(England) ENG	Nick Chatterton	33	9	26	7	3	2	2	0	2	0
	MF	(England) ENG	Mark Radford	15	0	12+2	0	0	0	0	0	1	0
	MF	(England) ENG	Gary Smith	12	0	11	0	0	0	0	0	1	0
	MF	(England) ENG	Richard Wilkins	54	11	46	9	3	2	2	0	3	0
	MF	(England) ENG	Keith Williams	10	0	9+1	0	0	0	0	0	0	0
	FW	(England) ENG	Lee Hunter	1	0	1	0	0	0	0	0	0	0
	FW	(Republic of Ireland) IRL	Tommy Keane	19	0	9+7	0	1	0	0	0	2	0
	FW	(England) ENG	Dale Tempest	51	14	44	11	3	1	0	0	4	2
	FW	(England) ENG	Mario Walsh	15	2	4+7	2	0+2	0	2	0	0	0
	FW	(England) ENG	Winston White	50	11	40+1	7	3	0	2	1	4	3
Players who appeared for Colchester who left during the season
	GK	(England) ENG	Graham Benstead	19	0	18	0	0	0	0	0	1	0
	GK	(Canada) CAN	Craig Forrest	11	0	11	0	0	0	0	0	0	0
	GK	(England) ENG	Trevor Lake	1	0	0	0	0	0	1	0	0	0
	DF	(England) ENG	Darren Angell	1	0	1	0	0	0	0	0	0	0
	DF	(England) ENG	Terry Baker	21	0	15	0	2	0	2	0	2	0
	DF	(England) ENG	David Coleman	6	1	6	1	0	0	0	0	0	0
	DF	(England) ENG	Paul Hinshelwood	49	5	40	5	3	0	2	0	4	0
	DF	(England) ENG	Glenn Keeley	5	0	4	0	0	0	0	0	1	0
	MF	(England) ENG	Sean Norman	11	1	6+2	0	0	0	2	0	1	1
	MF	(England) ENG	John Reeves	25	1	18+2	1	1	0	0+2	0	2	0
	FW	(England) ENG	Sean Farrell	9	1	4+5	1	0	0	0	0	0	0
	FW	(England) ENG	Simon Lowe	12	1	7+3	1	0	0	2	0	0	0

=== Goalscorers ===
Place	Nationality	Position	Name	Fourth Division	FA Cup	League Cup	Football League Trophy	Total
1	(Hong Kong)	FW	Dale Tempest	11	1	0	2	14
2	(England)	WG	Winston White	7	0	1	3	11
2	(England)	MF/DF	Richard Wilkins	9	2	0	0	11
4	(England)	MF	Nick Chatterton	7	2	0	0	9
5	(England)	FB	Paul Hinshelwood	5	0	0	0	5
6	(England)	DF/MF	Tony English	2	0	0	0	2
6	(England)	FW	Mario Walsh	2	0	0	0	2
8	(England)	FB	David Coleman	1	0	0	0	1
8	(England)	FW	Sean Farrell	1	0	0	0	1
8	(Northern Ireland)	CB	Colin Hill	0	1	0	0	1
8	(England)	FW	Simon Lowe	1	0	0	0	1
8	(England)	MF	Sean Norman	0	0	0	1	1
8	(England)	MF	John Reeves	1	0	0	0	1
			Own goals	0	0	0	0	0
			TOTALS	47	6	1	6	60

=== Disciplinary record ===
Nationality	Position	Name	Fourth Division		FA Cup		League Cup		Football League Trophy		Total	
Nationality	Position	Name	Yellow card	Red card	Yellow card	Red card	Yellow card	Red card	Yellow card	Red card	Yellow card	Red card
(England)	WG	Winston White	1	1	0	0	0	0	0	0	1	1
(England)	CB	Terry Baker	3	0	0	0	0	0	0	0	3	0
(England)	MF	John Reeves	0	1	0	0	0	0	0	0	0	1
(England)	MF	Gary Smith	3	0	0	0	0	0	0	0	3	0
(England)	DF/MF	Tony English	2	0	0	0	0	0	0	0	2	0
(England)	FB	Stephen Grenfell	2	0	0	0	0	0	0	0	2	0
(England)	CB	Stuart Hicks	2	0	0	0	0	0	0	0	2	0
(England)	FB	Paul Hinshelwood	2	0	0	0	0	0	0	0	2	0
(England)	CB	Glenn Keeley	1	0	0	0	0	0	1	0	2	0
(England)	CB	Rudi Hedman	1	0	0	0	0	0	0	0	1	0
(England)	MF	Sean Norman	1	0	0	0	0	0	0	0	1	0
(Hong Kong)	FW	Dale Tempest	1	0	0	0	0	0	0	0	1	0
(England)	MF	Keith Williams	1	0	0	0	0	0	0	0	1	0
		TOTALS	20	2	0	0	0	0	1	0	21	2

=== Clean sheets ===
Number of games goalkeepers kept a clean sheet.

Place	Nationality	Player	Fourth Division	FA Cup	League Cup	Football League Trophy	Total
1	(England)	Graham Benstead	6	0	0	1	7
1	(Wales)	Mark Walton	6	1	0	0	7
3	(Canada)	Craig Forrest	6	0	0	0	6
		TOTALS	18	1	0	1	20

=== Player debuts ===
Players making their first-team Colchester United debut in a fully competitive match.

Position	Nationality	Player	Date	Opponent	Ground	Notes
GK	(England)	Graham Benstead	15 August 1987	Burnley	Turf Moor	
FW	(England)	Mario Walsh	15 August 1987	Burnley	Turf Moor	
GK	(England)	Trevor Lake	18 August 1987	Fulham	Craven Cottage	
GK	(Wales)	Mark Walton	25 August 1987	Fulham	Layer Road	
FW	(Hong Kong)	Dale Tempest	29 August 1987	Scunthorpe United	Old Showground	
CB	(Northern Ireland)	Colin Hill	30 October 1987	Darlington	Layer Road	
MF	(England)	Gary Smith	6 November 1987	Halifax Town	The Shay	
GK	(Wales)	Mark Walton	14 November 1987	Tamworth	Layer Road	(Note: Second debut for the club)
MF	(England)	Keith Williams	11 December 1987	Bolton Wanderers	Layer Road	
CB	(England)	Darren Angell	18 December 1987	Tranmere Rovers	Prenton Park	
GK	(Wales)	Mark Walton	26 December 1987	Exeter City	St James Park	(Note: Third debut for the club)
WG	(Republic of Ireland)	Tommy Keane	1 January 1988	Scunthorpe United	Layer Road	
CB	(England)	John Ray	30 January 1988	Scarborough	Athletic Ground	
CB	(England)	Glenn Keeley	5 February 1988	Crewe Alexandra	Layer Road	
FB	(England)	David Coleman	19 February 1988	Burnley	Layer Road	
CB	(England)	Steve Hetzke	1 March 1988	Swansea City	Vetch Field	
GK	(Canada)	Craig Forrest	4 March 1988	Wrexham	Layer Road	
FW	(England)	Sean Farrell	25 March 1988	Cambridge United	Layer Road	
CB	(England)	Stuart Hicks	8 April 1988	Rochdale	Layer Road	
CB	(England)	Scott Daniels	23 April 1988	Carlisle United	Brunton Park	
WG	(England)	Lee Hunter	6 May 1988	Tranmere Rovers	Layer Road	

== See also ==
- List of Colchester United F.C. seasons
