= 1986–87 Colchester United F.C. season =

Colchester United
1986–87 season
- Chairman: Jonathan Crisp
- Manager: Mike Walker
- Stadium: Layer Road
- Fourth Division: 5th
- Play-offs: Semi-final (eliminated by Wolverhampton Wanderers
- FA Cup: 2nd round (eliminated by Aldershot)
- League Cup: 1st round (eliminated by Peterborough United)
- Associate Members' Cup: 1st round (southern section) (eliminated by Gillingham)
- Top goalscorer: League: Tony Adcock (11); All: Tony Adcock; Tommy English (12)
- Highest home attendance: 4,829 v Wolverhampton Wanderers, 14 May 1987
- Lowest home attendance: 1,404 v Peterborough United, 25 November 1986
- Average home league attendance: 2,753
- Biggest win: 5–1 v Stockport County, 6 March 1987
- Biggest defeat: 2–5 v Scunthorpe United, 21 November 1986
Home colours

The 1986–87 season was Colchester United's 45th season in their history and sixth consecutive season in fourth tier of English football, the Fourth Division. Alongside competing in the Fourth Division, the club also participated in the FA Cup, the League Cup and the Associate Members' Cup.

The play-offs were introduced in 1987 for clubs finishing in fourth, fifth and sixth positions. United ended the campaign in fifth place, ten points adrift of automatic promotion. They faced fourth placed Wolverhampton Wanderers in the semi-final, but were eliminated following a 2–0 defeat in the first leg and a 0–0 draw at Molineux Stadium in the second leg.

Colchester were eliminated from the FA Cup by eventual play-off winners Aldershot in the second round, and were defeated by Peterborough United and Gillingham respectively in the League Cup and Associate Members' Cup.

== Season overview ==
Mike Walker was appointed as permanent manager after finishing the previous campaign in a caretaker capacity.

Early in the season, Perry Groves was sold to Arsenal for £50,000, but despite this Colchester were bookmakers favourites heading into the new term. Seven successive away defeats from December denied the U's this opportunity as they came home in fifth position, ten points shy of promoted Essex rivals Southend United. However, with the introduction of the play-offs in 1987, Colchester had an opportunity to achieve promotion. They faced fourth-placed Wolverhampton Wanderers at a rain-soaked Layer Road in their semi-final first leg tie in front of a near-capacity 4,829. The visitors came away with a 2–0 victory, and a 0–0 draw at Molineux Stadium in the second leg meant Colchester would remain in the Fourth Division for at least another year.

Colchester did not fare well in cup competition once again, with an early exit in the League Cup to Peterborough United in the first round. They needed a replay against non-League Bishop's Stortford in the FA Cup to reach the second round, but were defeated 3–2 at Aldershot in the second round. The U's progressed from the preliminary round of the Associate Members' Cup to face Gillingham in the southern section first round, but were beaten 2–0 at Priestfield Stadium.

== Players ==
As of match played 17 May 1987.

Name	Position	Nationality	Place of birth	Date of birth	Apps	Goals	Signed from	Date signed	Fee
Goalkeepers
Alec Chamberlain	GK	(England)	March	20 June 1964 (aged 21)	165	0	(England) Ipswich Town	Summer 1982	Undisclosed
Defenders
Terry Baker	CB	(England)	Rochford	13 November 1965 (aged 20)	23	3	(England) Billericay Town	November 1985	Free transfer
Keith Day	CB	(England)	Grays	29 November 1962 (aged 23)	84	9	(England) Aveley	Summer 1984	Undisclosed
Tony English	DF/MF	(England)	Luton	19 October 1966 (aged 19)	75	14	(England) Coventry City	24 December 1984	Free transfer
Kirk Game	CB	(England)	Rochford	22 October 1966 (aged 19)	6	0	(England) Southend United	August 1985	Free transfer
Stephen Grenfell	FB	(England)	Enfield Town	27 October 1966 (aged 19)	7	1	(England) Tottenham Hotspur	28 November 1986 (Note: Date of signing refers to the date of the player's first game in his second spell for the club)	£15,000
Rudi Hedman	CB	(England)	Lambeth	16 November 1964 (aged 21)	84	5	Apprentice	February 1984	Free transfer
Paul Hinshelwood	FB	(England)	Bristol	14 August 1956 (aged 29)	0	0	(England) Millwall	September 1986	Undisclosed
Ian Phillips	FB	(Scotland)	Cumnock	23 April 1959 (aged 27)	134	8	(England) Northampton Town	September 1983	£5,000
Scott Young	FB	(England)	Shoreham-by-Sea	22 July 1969 (aged 16)	0	0	Apprentice	9 December 1986 (Note: Date of signing refers to the date of the player's first game for the club)	Free transfer
Midfielders
Nick Chatterton	MF	(England)	West Norwood	18 May 1954 (aged 32)	0	0	(England) Millwall	September 1986	Undisclosed
Andy Farrell	MF/FB	(England)	Colchester	7 October 1965 (aged 20)	92	1	Apprentice	Summer 1982	Free transfer
Sean Norman	MF	(England)	Lowestoft	27 November 1966 (aged 19)	0	0	(England) Lowestoft Town	23 August 1986	Undisclosed
Mark Radford	MF	(England)	Leicester	20 December 1968 (aged 17)	0	0	Apprentice	26 January 1987	Free transfer
John Reeves	MF	(England)	Hackney	8 July 1963 (aged 22)	27	4	(England) Fulham	August 1985	Undisclosed
Richard Wilkins	MF/DF	(England)	Lambeth	28 May 1965 (aged 21)	0	0	(England) Haverhill Rovers	18 November 1986	Undisclosed
Forwards
Tony Adcock	FW	(England)	Bethnal Green	27 March 1963 (aged 23)	209	100	Apprentice	31 March 1981	Free transfer
Simon Burman	WG/MF	(England)	Ipswich	26 November 1965 (aged 20)	20	1	Apprentice	15 February 1985	Free transfer
Simon Lowe	FW	(England)	Westminster	26 December 1962 (aged 23)	5	1	(England) Hartlepool United	10 January 1987	£5,000
Winston White	WG	(England)	Leicester	26 October 1958 (aged 27)	0	0	(England) Bury	February 1987	Free transfer

== Transfers ==
=== In ===
Date	Position	Nationality	Name	From	Fee	Ref.
23 August 1986	MF	(England)	Sean Norman	(England) Lowestoft Town	Undisclosed	(Note: Date of signing refers to the date of the player's first game for the club)
September 1986	FB	(England)	Paul Hinshelwood	(England) Millwall	Undisclosed	
September 1986	MF	(England)	Nick Chatterton	(England) Millwall	Undisclosed	
18 November 1986	MF/DF	(England)	Richard Wilkins	(England) Haverhill Rovers	Undisclosed	
28 November 1986	FB	(England)	Stephen Grenfell	(England) Tottenham Hotspur	£15,000	(Note: Date of signing refers to the date of the player's first game in his second spell for the club)
9 December 1986	FB	(England)	Scott Young	Apprentice	Free transfer	
10 January 1987	FW	(England)	Simon Lowe	(England) Hartlepool United	£5,000	
26 January 1987	MF	(England)	Mark Radford	Apprentice	Free transfer	
February 1987	WG	(England)	Winston White	(England) Bury	Free transfer	

- Total spending: ▼ ~ £20,000

=== Out ===
Date	Position	Nationality	Name	To	Fee	Ref.
September 1986	WG	(England)	Perry Groves	(England) Arsenal	£50,000	
7 November 1986	FW	(Wales)	Mick Ferguson	(England) Wealdstone	Undisclosed	(Note: Date of departure refers to the date of the player's final game for the club)
21 April 1987	FW	(England)	Tommy English	(England) Wealdstone	Undisclosed	

- Total incoming: ▲ ~ £50,000

=== Loans in ===
Date	Position	Nationality	Name	From	End date	Ref.
September 1986	WG	(England)	Keith Gorman	(England) Ipswich Town	3 October 1986	(Note: Loan end date refers to the date of the player's final game for the club)
October 1986	FB	(England)	Stephen Grenfell	(England) Tottenham Hotspur	25 November 1986	
December 1986	FW	(England)	Simon Lowe	(England) Hartlepool United	3 January 1987	

== Match details ==
=== Fourth Division ===
==== Results round by round ====
Round	1	2	3	4	5	6	7	8	9	10	11	12	13	14	15	16	17	18	19	20	21	22	23	24	25	26	27	28	29	30	31	32	33	34	35	36	37	38	39	40	41	42	43	44	45	46
Ground	A	H	A	H	H	A	H	A	H	A	H	A	A	H	A	H	A	H	H	A	H	A	A	H	H	A	H	A	A	H	A	H	A	H	A	H	H	A	A	H	H	A	H	A	H	A
Result	L	D	W	W	W	L	L	W	W	D	W	D	D	W	L	D	L	W	L	W	L	L	L	W	W	L	D	L	L	W	L	W	L	W	W	W	L	W	L	W	W	W	W	D	L	L
Position	22	19	9	4	3	6	11	7	3	3	2	2	2	2	4	4	4	4	8	5	6	8	8	6	5	5	5	6	6	5	7	5	7	5	6	5	5	6	7	5	5	5	5	5	5	5

Source: 11v11.com
A = Away; H = Home; W = Win; D = Draw; L = Loss

==== League table ====
Pos	Team	Pld	W	D	L	GF	GA	GD	Pts	Promotion or relegation
3	Southend United (P)	46	25	5	16	68	55	+13	80	Promotion to the Third Division
4	Wolverhampton Wanderers	46	24	7	15	69	50	+19	79	Qualification for the Fourth Division play-offs
5	Colchester United	46	21	7	18	64	56	+8	70	Qualification for the Fourth Division play-offs
6	Aldershot (O, P)	46	20	10	16	64	57	+7	70	Qualification for the Fourth Division play-offs
7	Orient	46	20	9	17	64	61	+3	69	

(O) Play-off winners; (P) Promoted

==== Matches ====
23 August 1986 1	Lincoln City	3–1	Colchester United	Lincoln
	McInnes 10'; Lund 26'; Cooper 36'	Report	Adcock 75'	Stadium: Sincil Bank; Attendance: 2,303; Referee: M Bailey

29 August 1986 2	Colchester United	1–1	Exeter City	Colchester
19:30 BST	Tony English 75'	Report	Kellow 89'	Stadium: Layer Road; Attendance: 1,633; Referee: G Napthine

5 September 1986 3	Tranmere Rovers	3–4	Colchester United	Birkenhead
	Muir 28'; Anderson 36'; Hughes 77'	Report	Reeves 9'; Adcock 27'; Tommy English 80', 90'	Stadium: Prenton Park; Attendance: 1,281; Referee: P Harrison

12 September 1986 4	Colchester United	3–0	Torquay United	Colchester
	Tony English 5', 27', 61'	Report		Stadium: Layer Road; Attendance: 2,476; Referee: David Elleray

16 September 1986 5	Colchester United	2–1	Hartlepool United	Colchester
	Adcock 60', 87'	Report	Hogan 36' (pen.)	Stadium: Layer Road; Attendance: 2,326; Referee: Kelvin Morton

20 September 1986 6	Rochdale	1–0	Colchester United	Rochdale
	Taylor 60'	Report		Stadium: Spotland Stadium; Attendance: 1,240; Referee: Robbie Hart

27 September 1986 7	Colchester United	1–3	Peterborough United	Colchester
	Day 86'	Report	Gregory 43'; Gunn 53' (pen.); Lawrence 57'	Stadium: Layer Road; Attendance: 2,343; Referee: D Reeves

1 October 1986 8	Hereford United	2–3	Colchester United	Hereford
	Wells 49'; Halliday 66'	Report	Burman 7'; Hedman 18'; Ferguson 47'	Stadium: Edgar Street; Attendance: 2,144; Referee: F Roberts

3 October 1986 9	Colchester United	2–1	Wrexham	Colchester
	Ferguson 15'; Williams 50' (o.g.)	Report	Massey 30'	Stadium: Layer Road; Attendance: 2,633; Referee: Phil Don

10 October 1986 10	Southend United	1–1	Colchester United	Southend-on-Sea
	Cadette 23'	Report	Hedman 47'	Stadium: Roots Hall; Attendance: 4,004; Referee: R Wiseman

17 October 1986 11	Colchester United	3–1	Cardiff City	Colchester
19:30 BST	Reeves 18'; Tony English 55'; Burman 81'	Report	Wheeler 83'	Stadium: Layer Road; Attendance: 3,160; Referee: Alf Buksh

21 October 1986 12	Crewe Alexandra	1–1	Colchester United	Crewe
	Thomas 45'	Report	Tommy English 57'	Stadium: Gresty Road; Attendance: 1,812; Referee: W Flood

24 October 1986 13	Stockport County	1–1	Colchester United	Stockport
	Entwistle 9'	Report	Tommy English 77'	Stadium: Edgeley Park; Attendance: 1,278; Referee: T Ashby

31 October 1986 14	Colchester United	3–0	Wolverhampton Wanderers	Colchester
	Ferguson 49'; Streete 74' (o.g.); Tony English 82'	Report		Stadium: Layer Road; Attendance: 4,741; Referee: M Scott

4 November 1986 15	Burnley	2–1	Colchester United	Burnley
	Grewcock 28'; Hoskin 45'	Report	Ferguson 85'	Stadium: Turf Moor; Attendance: 1,692; Referee: J Key

7 November 1986 16	Colchester United	0–0	Orient	Colchester
19:30 GMT		Report		Stadium: Layer Road; Attendance: 3,924; Referee: D Hedges

21 November 1986 17	Scunthorpe United	5–2	Colchester United	Scunthorpe
	Lister 4'; Broddle 45'; Johnson 63', 66'; McLean 83' (pen.)	Report	Hedman 25'; Grenfell 70'	Stadium: Old Showground; Attendance: 1,725; Referee: A Robinson

28 November 1986 18	Colchester United	3–1	Halifax Town	Colchester
	Farrell 37'; Adcock 75'; Phillips 89'	Report	Longhurst 84'	Stadium: Layer Road; Attendance: 2,567; Referee: I Hemley

13 December 1986 19	Colchester United	0–2	Preston North End	Colchester
15:00 GMT		Report	Williams 63'; Hildersley 90'	Stadium: Layer Road; Attendance: 2,240; Referee: J Martin

20 December 1986 20	Swansea City	1–2	Colchester United	Swansea
	McCarthy 7' (pen.)	Report	Tommy English 47'; Farrell 76'	Stadium: Vetch Field; Attendance: 4,515; Referee: K Baker

26 December 1986 21	Colchester United	1–2	Cambridge United	Colchester
11:00 GMT	Lowe 51'	Report	Crown 12'; Spriggs 19'	Stadium: Layer Road; Attendance: 3,376; Referee: Ian Borrett

27 December 1986 22	Aldershot	1–0	Colchester United	Aldershot
	Langley 67'	Report		Stadium: Recreation Ground; Attendance: 2,594; Referee: Tony Ward

1 January 1987 23	Northampton Town	3–2	Colchester United	Northampton
	Benjamin 50'; Morley 56'; Gilbert 86' (pen.)	Report	Adcock 52', 63'	Stadium: County Ground; Attendance: 8,215; Referee: D Vickers

3 January 1987 24	Colchester United	1–0	Scunthorpe United	Colchester
15:00 GMT	Adcock 45'	Report		Stadium: Layer Road; Attendance: 2,100; Referee: N Butler

10 January 1987 25	Colchester United	2–0	Lincoln City	Colchester
15:00 GMT	Farrell 39', 68'	Report		Stadium: Layer Road; Attendance: 1,768; Referee: Vic Callow

17 January 1987 26	Exeter City	2–0	Colchester United	Exeter
	Baker 4' (o.g.); Robson 80'	Report		Stadium: St James Park; Attendance: 2,553; Referee: D Reeves

23 January 1987 27	Colchester United	1–1	Tranmere Rovers	Colchester
19:30 GMT	Norman 79'	Report	Worthington 53'	Stadium: Layer Road; Attendance: 2,167; Referee: M Cotton

31 January 1987 28	Torquay United	3–1	Colchester United	Torquay
	McNichol 41'; Dobson 48'; Nardiello 64'	Report	Adcock 51'	Stadium: Plainmoor; Attendance: 1,034; Referee: J Deakin

6 February 1987 29	Hartlepool United	1–0	Colchester United	Hartlepool
	Walker 90'	Report		Stadium: Victoria Park; Attendance: 1,235; Referee: C Seel

13 February 1987 30	Colchester United	2–0	Rochdale	Colchester
19:30 GMT	Tommy English 13'; Wilkins 82'	Report		Stadium: Layer Road; Attendance: 2,020; Referee: Brian Hill

21 February 1987 31	Peterborough United	2–0	Colchester United	Peterborough
	Phillips 7' (pen.); Gallagher 15'	Report		Stadium: London Road Stadium; Attendance: 2,020; Referee: D Scott

27 February 1987 32	Colchester United	2–0	Hereford United	Colchester
19:30 GMT	Tommy English 52' (pen.); Phillips 54'	Report		Stadium: Layer Road; Attendance: 1,999; Referee: Alf Buksh

3 March 1987 33	Wolverhampton Wanderers	2–0	Colchester United	Wolverhampton
	Holmes 41'; Bull 86'	Report		Stadium: Molineux Stadium; Attendance: 5,715; Referee: D Shaw

6 March 1987 34	Colchester United	5–1	Stockport County	Colchester
19:30 GMT	Lowe 4', 14', 30'; Tommy English 17'; Day 46'	Report	Edwards 78'; Allatt (red card) 10'	Stadium: Layer Road; Attendance: 2,001; Referee: N Butler

14 March 1987 35	Cardiff City	0–2	Colchester United	Cardiff
		Report	Lowe 49', 51'	Stadium: Ninian Park; Attendance: 2,222; Referee: Vic Callow

17 March 1987 36	Colchester United	2–1	Crewe Alexandra	Colchester
	Day 13'; Lowe 84'	Report	Blissett 47'	Stadium: Layer Road; Attendance: 2,249; Referee: Colin Downey

20 March 1987 37	Colchester United	1–2	Southend United	Colchester
	White 43'	Report	Johnson 59'; Cadette 89'	Stadium: Layer Road; Attendance: 3,357; Referee: Rob Lewis

28 March 1987 38	Wrexham	0–1	Colchester United	Wrexham
		Report	Tommy English 80'	Stadium: Racecourse Ground; Attendance: 1,320; Referee: Joe Worrall

3 April 1987 39	Orient	1–0	Colchester United	Leyton
	Jones 38'	Report	Phillips (red card) 21'	Stadium: Brisbane Road; Attendance: 3,105; Referee: Keith Cooper

10 April 1987 40	Colchester United	1–0	Burnley	Colchester
19:30 BST	Adcock 29'	Report		Stadium: Layer Road; Attendance: 2,635; Referee: M Dimblebee

17 April 1987 41	Colchester United	3–1	Northampton Town	Colchester
19:30 BST	Wilkins 39'; Chatterton 57' (pen.); Hedman 76'	Report	Logan 15'	Stadium: Layer Road; Attendance: 3,676; Referee: Colin Downey

21 April 1987 42	Cambridge United	0–1	Colchester United	Cambridge
		Report	Tony English 63'	Stadium: Abbey Stadium; Attendance: 2,946; Referee: P Vanes

24 April 1987 43	Colchester United	2–1	Swansea City	Colchester
19:30 BST	Hinshelwood 58'; Adcock 59'	Report	Atkinson 11'	Stadium: Layer Road; Attendance: 3,323

29 April 1987 44	Halifax Town	0–0	Colchester United	Halifax
		Report		Stadium: The Shay; Attendance: 911; Referee: M Heath

4 May 1987 45	Colchester United	0–1	Aldershot	Colchester
11:00 BST		Report	Ring 26'	Stadium: Layer Road; Attendance: 4,310; Referee: Ian Borrett

9 May 1987 46	Preston North End	1–0	Colchester United	Preston
	Swann 90'	Report		Stadium: Deepdale; Attendance: 8,757; Referee: M Scott

==== Football League play-offs ====
14 May 1987 Semi-final 1st leg	Colchester United	0–2	Wolverhampton Wanderers	Colchester
19:30 BST		Report	Kelly 28'; Bull 32'	Stadium: Layer Road; Attendance: 4,829; Referee: Rob Lewis

17 May 1987 Semi-final 2nd leg	Wolverhampton Wanderers	0–0	Colchester United	Wolverhampton
12:15 BST		Report		Stadium: Molineux Stadium; Attendance: 16,330
Note: Wolverhampton won 2–0 on aggregate.

=== League Cup ===
26 August 1986 1st round 1st leg	Colchester United	0–0	Peterborough United	Colchester
19:30 BST		Report		Stadium: Layer Road; Attendance: 1,551; Referee: Martin Bodenham

3 September 1986 1st round 2nd leg	Peterborough United	2–0	Colchester United	Peterborough
	Gallagher 70'; Luke 86'	Report		Stadium: London Road Stadium; Attendance: 2,648; Referee: Keren Barratt
Note: Peterborough won 2–0 on aggregate.

=== FA Cup ===
15 November 1986 1st round	Bishop's Stortford	1–1	Colchester United	Bishop's Stortford
	Fergusson 45'	Report	Tommy English 20'	Stadium: Rhodes Avenue; Attendance: 2,413; Referee: Colin Downey

18 November 1986 1st round replay	Colchester United	2–0	Bishop's Stortford	Colchester
	Tommy English 2'; Adcock 77'	Report		Stadium: Layer Road; Attendance: 3,516; Referee: Colin Downey

6 December 1986 2nd round	Aldershot	3–2	Colchester United	Aldershot
	Wignall 2'; Foyle 17', 77'	Report	Tommy English 1'; Grenfell 90'	Stadium: Recreation Ground; Attendance: 2,997

=== Associate Members' Cup ===
Group 1
Team	Pld	W	D	L	GF	GA	GD	Pts
Aldershot	2	1	1	0	7	5	+2	4
Colchester United	2	1	0	1	4	5	−1	3
Peterborough United	2	0	1	1	4	5	−1	1

25 November 1986 Preliminary round (southern section)	Colchester United	2–1	Peterborough United	Colchester
	Hedman 25'; Gage 73' (o.g.)	Report	Phillips 56'	Stadium: Layer Road; Attendance: 1,404; Referee: Colin Downey

9 December 1986 Preliminary round (southern section)	Aldershot	4–2	Colchester United	Aldershot
	King 8'; Fielder 15'; Mazzon 48'; Ring 70'	Report	Wilkins 34', 85'	Stadium: Recreation Ground; Attendance: 993; Referee: M James

26 January 1987 1st round (southern section)	Gillingham	2–0	Colchester United	Gillingham
	Smith 66'; Cascarino 77'	Report		Stadium: Priestfield Stadium; Attendance: 1,984; Referee: Ian Borrett

== Squad statistics ==
=== Appearances and goals ===
No.	Pos	Nat	Player	Total		Fourth Division		FA Cup		League Cup		Football League Trophy		Football League play-offs	
No.	Pos	Nat	Player	Apps	Goals	Apps	Goals	Apps	Goals	Apps	Goals	Apps	Goals	Apps	Goals
	FW	(England) ENG	Alec Chamberlain	56	0	46	0	3	0	2	0	3	0	2	0
	DF	(England) ENG	Terry Baker	23	0	19	0	0	0	2	0	1	0	1	0
	DF	(England) ENG	Keith Day	46	3	38	3	3	0	1	0	3	0	1	0
	DF	(England) ENG	Tony English	40	7	32	7	3	0	1	0	2	0	2	0
	DF	(England) ENG	Kirk Game	32	0	25	0	3	0	1+1	0	2	0	0	0
	DF	(England) ENG	Stephen Grenfell	30	2	23	1	3	1	0	0	3	0	1	0
	DF	(England) ENG	Rudi Hedman	54	5	38+6	4	2+1	0	2	0	2+1	1	2	0
	DF	(England) ENG	Paul Hinshelwood	49	1	41	1	3	0	0	0	3	0	2	0
	DF	(Scotland) SCO	Ian Phillips	41	2	33	2	3	0	2	0	3	0	0	0
	DF	(England) ENG	Scott Young	1	0	0	0	0	0	0	0	0+1	0	0	0
	MF	(England) ENG	Nick Chatterton	22	1	20+1	1	0	0	0	0	0	0	1	0
	FW	(England) ENG	Andy Farrell	36	4	24+4	4	3	0	2	0	3	0	0	0
	MF	(England) ENG	Sean Norman	17	1	12+1	1	0	0	1	0	1	0	2	0
	MF	(England) ENG	Mark Radford	1	0	0	0	0	0	0	0	0+1	0	0	0
	MF	(England) ENG	John Reeves	20	2	16+1	2	0+1	0	2	0	0	0	0	0
	MF	(England) ENG	Richard Wilkins	30	4	22+1	2	0+2	0	0	0	2+1	2	2	0
	FW	(England) ENG	Tony Adcock	45	12	33+2	11	3	1	2	0	3	0	2	0
	FW	(England) ENG	Simon Burman	14	2	10+2	2	1+1	0	0	0	0	0	0	0
	FW	(England) ENG	Simon Lowe	28	7	25+1	7	0	0	0	0	0	0	2	0
	FW	(England) ENG	Winston White	16	1	14	1	0	0	0	0	0	0	2	0
Players who appeared for Colchester who left during the season
	FW	(England) ENG	Tommy English	30	12	18+6	9	3	3	1	0	2	0	0	0
	FW	(England) ENG	Mick Ferguson	19	4	16	4	1	0	2	0	0	0	0	0
	FW	(England) ENG	Keith Gorman	1	0	0+1	0	0	0	0	0	0	0	0	0
	FW	(England) ENG	Perry Groves	1	0	1	0	0	0	0	0	0	0	0	0

=== Goalscorers ===
Place	Nationality	Position	Name	Fourth Division	FA Cup	League Cup	Football League Trophy	Football League play-offs	Total
1	(England)	FW	Tony Adcock	11	1	0	0	0	12
1	(England)	FW	Tommy English	9	3	0	0	0	12
3	(England)	DF/MF	Tony English	7	0	0	0	0	7
3	(England)	FW	Simon Lowe	7	0	0	0	0	7
5	(England)	CB	Rudi Hedman	4	0	0	1	0	5
6	(England)	MF/FB	Andy Farrell	4	0	0	0	0	4
6	(England)	FW	Mick Ferguson	4	0	0	0	0	4
6	(England)	MF/DF	Richard Wilkins	2	0	0	2	0	4
9	(England)	CB	Keith Day	3	0	0	0	0	3
10	(England)	WG/MF	Simon Burman	2	0	0	0	0	2
10	(England)	FB	Stephen Grenfell	1	1	0	0	0	2
10	(Scotland)	FB	Ian Phillips	2	0	0	0	0	2
10	(England)	MF	John Reeves	2	0	0	0	0	2
14	(England)	MF	Nick Chatterton	1	0	0	0	0	1
14	(England)	FB	Paul Hinshelwood	1	0	0	0	0	1
14	(England)	MF	Sean Norman	1	0	0	0	0	1
14	(England)	WG	Winston White	1	0	0	0	0	1
			Own goals	2	0	0	1	0	3
			TOTALS	64	5	0	4	0	73

=== Disciplinary record ===
Nationality	Position	Name	Fourth Division		FA Cup		League Cup		Football League Trophy		Football League play-offs		Total	
Nationality	Position	Name	Booked	Sent off (straight red)	Booked	Sent off (straight red)	Booked	Sent off (straight red)	Booked	Sent off (straight red)	Booked	Sent off (straight red)	Booked	Sent off (straight red)
(England)	CB	Keith Day	3	0	1	0	0	1	0	0	0	0	5	0
(England)	FB	Paul Hinshelwood	3	0	1	0	0	0	0	0	0	0	4	0
(Scotland)	FB	Ian Phillips	0	1	0	0	0	0	0	0	0	0	0	1
(England)	WG/MF	Simon Burman	2	0	0	0	0	0	0	0	0	0	2	0
(England)	FB	Stephen Grenfell	1	0	1	0	0	0	0	0	0	0	2	0
(England)	CB	Rudi Hedman	0	0	1	0	0	0	1	0	0	0	2	0
(England)	FW	Tony Adcock	1	0	0	0	0	0	0	0	0	0	1	0
(England)	CB	Terry Baker	1	0	0	0	0	0	0	0	0	0	1	0
(England)	GK	Alec Chamberlain	1	0	0	0	0	0	0	0	0	0	1	0
(England)	DF/MF	Tony English	1	0	0	0	0	0	0	0	0	0	1	0
(England)	MF/FB	Andy Farrell	1	0	0	0	0	0	0	0	0	0	1	0
(England)	FW	Mick Ferguson	1	0	0	0	0	0	0	0	0	0	1	0
(England)	CB	Kirk Game	0	0	1	0	0	0	0	0	0	0	1	0
		TOTALS	15	1	5	0	0	0	2	0	0	0	22	1

=== Clean sheets ===
Number of games goalkeepers kept a clean sheet.

Place	Nationality	Player	Fourth Division	FA Cup	League Cup	Football League Trophy	Football League play-offs	Total
1	(England)	Alec Chamberlain	12	1	1	0	1	15
		TOTALS	12	1	1	0	1	15

=== Player debuts ===
Players making their first-team Colchester United debut in a fully competitive match.

Position	Nationality	Player	Date	Opponent	Ground	Notes
MF	(England)	Sean Norman	23 August 1986	Lincoln City	Sincil Bank	
MF	(England)	Nick Chatterton	12 September 1986	Torquay United	Layer Road	
FB	(England)	Paul Hinshelwood	12 September 1986	Torquay United	Layer Road	
WG	(England)	Keith Gorman	3 October 1986	Wrexham	Layer Road	
FB	(England)	Stephen Grenfell	31 October 1986	Wolverhampton Wanderers	Layer Road	
MF/DF	(England)	Richard Wilkins	18 November 1986	Bishop's Stortford	Layer Road	
FB	(England)	Stephen Grenfell	28 November 1986	Wolverhampton Wanderers	Layer Road	(Note: Second debut for the club)
FB	(England)	Scott Young	9 December 1986	Aldershot	Recreation Ground	
FW	(England)	Simon Lowe	20 December 1986	Swansea City	Vetch Field	
FW	(England)	Simon Lowe	10 January 1987	Lincoln City	Layer Road	
MF	(England)	Mark Radford	26 January 1987	Gillingham	Priestfield Stadium	
WG	(England)	Winston White	3 March 1987	Wolverhampton Wanderers	Molineux Stadium	

== See also ==
- List of Colchester United F.C. seasons
