= 1985–86 Colchester United F.C. season =

Colchester United
1985–86 season
- Chairman: Jonathan Crisp
- Manager: Cyril Lea (until 10 April); Mike Walker (from 10 April)
- Stadium: Layer Road
- Fourth Division: 6th
- FA Cup: 1st round (eliminated by Wycombe Wanderers)
- League Cup: 1st round (eliminated by Millwall)
- Associate Members' Cup: Preliminary round (southern section)
- Top goalscorer: League: Tony Adcock (15); All: Tony Adcock (16)
- Highest home attendance: 3,927 v Exeter City, 4 October 1985
- Lowest home attendance: 1,356 v Crewe Alexandra, 25 March 1986
- Average home league attendance: 2,253
- Biggest win: 5–0 v Peterborough United, 22 April 1986
- Biggest defeat: 0–4 v Chester City, 6 November 1985
Home colours

The 1985–86 season was Colchester United's 44th season in their history and fifth consecutive season in fourth tier of English football, the Fourth Division. Alongside competing in the Fourth Division, the club also participated in the FA Cup, the League Cup and the Associate Members' Cup.

Colchester finished sixth in the league table come the end of the season, but were nine points distant of promoted Port Vale in fourth place. The U's were knocked out of the FA Cup by non-League opposition in Wycombe Wanderers in the first round, and exited the League Cup in the first round to Millwall. Despite a win against Southend United in the Associate Members' Cup, Colchester were defeated by Northampton Town who progressed from the group stages to the knockout phase of the competition.

Three weeks prior to the end of the season, manager Cyril Lea was sacked and replaced by former U's goalkeeper Mike Walker.

== Season overview ==
Following regulation changes in the wake of the Heysel Stadium disaster and the Bradford City stadium fire, Layer Road was facing £500,000 of safety improvements to bring the ground up to standards. With the club ailing financially, sections of the ground were closed, reducing capacity to 4,900.

Manager Cyril Lea continued a trend of recruiting former Ipswich Town by bringing in forwards Robin Turner and Trevor Whymark during the season.

In October, the club were top of the table, but after suffering six successive league defeats, four without scoring, the club slid down the table and crashed out of the FA Cup to non-League Wycombe Wanderers. They had already made an early exit to Millwall in the League Cup and would soon follow suit in the Associate Members' Cup.

Lea struggled to find a strike partner for Tony Adcock following a car crash that ended Keith Bowen's playing career. The side were otherwise free scoring, and despite a good record, Lea was sacked three weeks ahead of the end of the campaign and replaced by Reserve team coach Mike Walker. Walker, initially in a caretaker capacity, took the U's on an unbeaten run for their final eight games of the season, winning five. This left the club in sixth position in the table, nine points shy of promotion.

The season was notable for hat-tricks, with Perry Groves twice achieving the feat against Southend United and brothers Tommy and Tony English scoring hat-tricks within five days of one another. The brothers were also both sent off at Crewe Alexandra in April, a game which Colchester won 2–0.

== Players ==
As of match played 6 May 1986.

Name	Position	Nationality	Place of birth	Date of birth	Apps	Goals	Signed from	Date signed	Fee
Goalkeepers
Alec Chamberlain	GK	(England)	March	20 June 1964 (aged 20)	114	0	(England) Ipswich Town	Summer 1982	Undisclosed
Defenders
Terry Baker	CB	(England)	Rochford	13 November 1965 (aged 19)	0	0	(England) Billericay Town	November 1985	Free transfer
Keith Day	CB	(England)	Grays	29 November 1962 (aged 22)	52	4	(England) Aveley	Summer 1984	Undisclosed
Tony English	DF/MF	(England)	Luton	19 October 1966 (aged 18)	25	3	(England) Coventry City	24 December 1984	Free transfer
Kirk Game	CB	(England)	Rochford	22 October 1966 (aged 18)	0	0	(England) Southend United	August 1985	Free transfer
Rudi Hedman	CB	(England)	Lambeth	16 November 1964 (aged 20)	40	2	Apprentice	February 1984	Free transfer
Ian Phillips	FB	(Scotland)	Cumnock	23 April 1959 (aged 26)	93	6	(England) Northampton Town	September 1983	£5,000
Midfielders
Andy Farrell	MF/FB	(England)	Colchester	7 October 1965 (aged 19)	67	0	Apprentice	Summer 1982	Free transfer
John Reeves	MF	(England)	Hackney	8 July 1963 (aged 21)	0	0	(England) Fulham	August 1985	Undisclosed
Forwards
Tony Adcock	FW	(England)	Bethnal Green	27 March 1963 (aged 22)	171	84	Apprentice	31 March 1981	Free transfer
Simon Burman	WG/MF	(England)	Ipswich	26 November 1965 (aged 19)	9	0	Apprentice	15 February 1985	Free transfer
Tommy English	FW	(England)	Cirencester	18 October 1961 (aged 23)	1	0	(Australia) Canberra City	8 November 1985 (Note: Date of signing refers to the date of the player's first game in his second spell for the club)	Undisclosed
Mick Ferguson	FW	(England)	Newcastle upon Tyne	3 October 1954 (aged 30)	0	0	(England) Brighton & Hove Albion	31 March 1986	Undisclosed
Perry Groves	WG	(England)	Bow	19 April 1965 (aged 20)	133	17	(England) Cornard Dynamos	Summer 1981	Free transfer

== Transfers ==
=== In ===
Date	Position	Nationality	Name	From	Fee	Ref.
August 1985	CB	(England)	Kirk Game	(England) Southend United	Free transfer	
August 1985	MF	(England)	John Reeves	(England) Fulham	Undisclosed	
November 1985	CB	(England)	Terry Baker	(England) Billericay Town	Free transfer	
8 November 1985	FW	(England)	Tommy English	(Australia) Canberra City	Undisclosed	(Note: Date of signing refers to the date of the player's first game in his second spell for the club)
23 November 1985	FW	(England)	Trevor Whymark	(England) Diss Town	Free transfers	(Note: Date of signing refers to the date of the player's first game for the club)
20 December 1985	FW	(England)	Robin Turner	(Wales) Swansea City	Undisclosed	
31 March 1986	FW	(England)	Mick Ferguson	(England) Brighton & Hove Albion	Undisclosed	

- Total spending: ▼ ~ £0

=== Out ===
Date	Position	Nationality	Name	To	Fee	Ref.
End of season	FW	(Dominica)	Liburd Henry	(England) Rainham Town	Free transfer	
26 October 1985	FW	(Wales)	Keith Bowen	Free agent	Retired	(Note: Date of departure refers to the date of the player's final game for the club)
6 November 1985	MF	(England)	Jeff Hull	Free agent	Retired	
14 December 1985	FW	(England)	Trevor Whymark	Free agent	Released	
31 January 1986	MF	(England)	Russell Irving	(England) Stowmarket Town	Undisclosed	
31 March 1986	MF	(England)	Noel Parkinson	Free agent	Retired	
8 April 1986	CB	(Scotland)	Stewart Houston	Free agent	Retired	(Note: Joined Plymouth Argyle as coach)
6 May 1986	MF	(England)	Roger Osborne	(England) Sudbury Town	Undisclosed	
6 May 1986	FW	(England)	Robin Turner	(England) Bury Town	Released	

- Total incoming: ▲ ~ £0

=== Loans in ===
Date	Position	Nationality	Name	From	End date	Ref.
November 1985	FW	(England)	Robin Turner	(Wales) Swansea City	14 December 1985	(Note: Loan end date refers to the date of the player's final game for the club)

== Match details ==
=== Fourth Division ===
==== Results round by round ====
Round	1	2	3	4	5	6	7	8	9	10	11	12	13	14	15	16	17	18	19	20	21	22	23	24	25	26	27	28	29	30	31	32	33	34	35	36	37	38	39	40	41	42	43	44	45	46
Ground	H	A	H	A	H	A	H	A	H	A	H	A	H	A	H	A	A	H	A	A	H	A	A	H	H	A	H	A	H	A	A	H	A	H	H	A	H	H	A	A	H	H	A	A	H	H
Result	W	L	W	L	W	W	W	W	W	W	D	L	D	W	L	L	L	L	L	L	W	D	L	W	D	D	L	D	W	D	D	D	L	L	D	W	L	W	D	D	W	W	W	W	W	D
Position	5	11	6	8	4	4	2	2	1	1	1	1	1	1	2	5	7	7	9	12	10	11	13	11	11	10	10	12	9	9	12	12	15	16	14	13	14	12	12	12	12	8	8	6	6	6

Source: 11v11.com
A = Away; H = Home; W = Win; D = Draw; L = Loss

==== League table ====
Pos	Team	Pld	W	D	L	GF	GA	GD	Pts	Promotion or relegation
4	Port Vale (P)	46	21	16	9	67	37	+30	79	Promotion to the Third Division
5	Orient	46	20	12	14	79	64	+15	72	
6	Colchester United	46	19	13	14	88	63	+25	70	
7	Hartlepool United	46	20	10	16	68	67	+1	70	
8	Northampton Town	46	18	10	18	79	58	+21	64	

(P) Promoted

==== Matches ====
17 August 1985 1	Colchester United	3–1	Stockport County	Colchester
11:30 BST	Osborne 36'; Day 71'; Adcock 74'	Report	Smith 78'	Stadium: Layer Road; Attendance: 1,719; Referee: E Scales

24 August 1985 2	Wrexham	2–1	Colchester United	Wrexham
	Bowen 59' (o.g.); Steel 63'	Report	Reeves 30'	Stadium: Racecourse Ground; Attendance: 2,296; Referee: M Reed

27 August 1985 3	Colchester United	4–0	Aldershot	Colchester
19:30 BST	Tony English 36'; Adcock 73'; Groves 78'; Hedman 82'	Report		Stadium: Layer Road; Attendance: 1,928; Referee: K Baker

31 August 1985 4	Torquay United	2–1	Colchester United	Torquay
	Lambert 3'; Crowe 54'	Report	Adcock 27'	Stadium: Plainmoor; Attendance: 1,023; Referee: A Robinson

6 September 1985 5	Colchester United	3–1	Halifax Town	Colchester
19:30 BST	Adcock 1', 20'; Bowen 56'	Report	Gallagher 60'	Stadium: Layer Road; Attendance: 2,023; Referee: M Cotton

14 September 1985 6	Tranmere Rovers	3–4	Colchester United	Birkenhead
	Sinclair 30'; Muir 41'; Worthington 58' (pen.)	Report	Tony English 34'; Groves 38'; Parkinson 40'; Day 46'	Stadium: Prenton Park; Attendance: 1,362; Referee: D Shaw

17 September 1985 7	Colchester United	4–1	Cambridge United	Colchester
	Adcock 2', 30', 57'; Groves 85'	Report	Crown 75'	Stadium: Layer Road; Attendance: 2,574; Referee: N Butler

21 September 1985 8	Orient	1–2	Colchester United	Leyton
	Shinners 33'	Report	Parkinson 56'; Bowen 88'	Stadium: Brisbane Road; Attendance: 2,577; Referee: G Napthine

27 September 1985 9	Colchester United	1–0	Port Vale	Colchester
19:30 BST	Bowen 32'	Report		Stadium: Layer Road; Attendance: 3,110; Referee: Alan Gunn

1 October 1985 10	Burnley	0–2	Colchester United	Burnley
		Report	Adcock 46'; Bowen 60'	Stadium: Turf Moor; Attendance: 3,375; Referee: A Saunders

4 October 1985 11	Colchester United	1–1	Exeter City	Colchester
19:30 BST	Day 29'	Report	Gale 47'	Stadium: Layer Road; Attendance: 3,927; Referee: D Reeves

12 October 1985 12	Mansfield Town	2–1	Colchester United	Mansfield
	Luke 56'; Chamberlain 62'	Report	Tony English 51'	Stadium: Field Mill; Attendance: 3,364; Referee: K Brean

18 October 1985 13	Colchester United	1–1	Scunthorpe United	Colchester
19:30 BST	Reeves 78'	Report	Broddle 67'	Stadium: Layer Road; Attendance: 3,462; Referee: Brian Hill

22 October 1985 14	Southend United	2–4	Colchester United	Southend-on-Sea
19:45 BST	Gymer 74'; McDonough 77'	Report	Bowen 16'; Groves 49', 63', 85'	Stadium: Roots Hall; Attendance: 8,120; Referee: D Vickers

26 October 1985 15	Colchester United	0–2	Northampton Town	Colchester
11:00 BST		Report	Chard 2'; Mann 23'	Stadium: Layer Road; Attendance: 2,872; Referee: M James

2 November 1985 16	Hereford United	2–0	Colchester United	Hereford
	Phillips 7', 37'	Report		Stadium: Edgar Street; Attendance: 3,081; Referee: R Groves

6 November 1985 17	Chester City	4–0	Colchester United	Chester
	Greenough 16'; Rimmer 59', 70'; Abel 75'	Report		Stadium: Sealand Road; Attendance: 2,809; Referee: David Allison

8 November 1985 18	Colchester United	0–1	Rochdale	Colchester
19:30 GMT		Report	McMahon 70'	Stadium: Layer Road; Attendance: 2,624; Referee: I Hemley

23 November 1985 19	Preston North End	3–2	Colchester United	Preston
14:00 GMT	Thomas 16'; Gray; Stevens 47'	Report	Parkinson 68' (pen.); Adcock 80'	Stadium: Deepdale; Attendance: 2,793; Referee: F Roberts

14 December 1985 20	Hartlepool United	4–1	Colchester United	Hartlepool
	Shoulder 2', 43' (pen.); Dixon 74'; Robinson 78'	Report	Hedman 36'	Stadium: Victoria Park; Attendance: 2,507; Referee: A Banks

20 December 1985 21	Colchester United	5–2	Wrexham	Colchester
19:30 GMT	Comstive 9' (o.g.); Adcock 17', 84'; Groves 77'; Hedman 79'	Report	Cunnington 55'; Gregory 77'	Stadium: Layer Road; Attendance: 1,683; Referee: A Robinson

28 December 1985 22	Aldershot	1–1	Colchester United	Aldershot
	Coleman 35'	Report	Day 4'	Stadium: Recreation Ground; Attendance: 1,757; Referee: Keith Cooper

1 January 1986 23	Swindon Town	2–1	Colchester United	Swindon
	Cole 4'; Wade 45'	Report	Parkinson 55'	Stadium: County Ground; Attendance: 8,802; Referee: Rob Lewis

3 January 1986 24	Colchester United	4–1	Hereford United	Colchester
19:30 GMT	Parkinson 43', 83'; Tommy English 77'; Phillips 80'	Report	Delve 84'	Stadium: Layer Road; Attendance: 2,214; Referee: Tony Ward

11 January 1986 25	Colchester United	0–0	Torquay United	Colchester
11:30 GMT		Report		Stadium: Layer Road; Attendance: 2,063; Referee: D Hedges

17 January 1986 26	Stockport County	1–1	Colchester United	Stockport
	Hodkinson 9'	Report	Groves 30'	Stadium: Edgeley Park; Attendance: 2,336; Referee: T Mills

24 January 1986 27	Colchester United	1–2	Tranmere Rovers	Colchester
19:30 GMT	Parkinson 78'	Report	Hilditch 30'; Mungall 41'	Stadium: Layer Road; Attendance: 2,013; Referee: Colin Downey

31 January 1986 28	Halifax Town	2–2	Colchester United	Halifax
	Sanderson 70'; Kellock 73'	Report	Baker 36'; Adcock 60'	Stadium: The Shay; Attendance: 989; Referee: G Aplin

4 February 1986 29	Colchester United	2–0	Southend United	Colchester
	Adcock 4'; Clark 22' (o.g.)	Report		Stadium: Layer Road; Attendance: 1,915; Referee: E Scales

1 March 1986 30	Port Vale	1–1	Colchester United	Burslem
	Jones 77'	Report	Groves 68'	Stadium: Vale Park; Attendance: 2,726; Referee: Peter Willis

8 March 1986 31	Exeter City	2–2	Colchester United	Exeter
	Ward 67'; Crawford 67'	Report	Adcock 42'; Burman 85'	Stadium: St James Park; Attendance: 1,520; Referee: Keith Cooper

14 March 1986 32	Colchester United	0–0	Mansfield Town	Colchester
19:30 GMT		Report		Stadium: Layer Road; Attendance: 1,956; Referee: L Shapter

22 March 1986 33	Northampton Town	1–0	Colchester United	Northampton
	Donald 13'	Report		Stadium: County Ground; Attendance: 2,035; Referee: P Tyldesley

25 March 1986 34	Colchester United	1–2	Crewe Alexandra	Colchester
	Tony English 62'	Report	Cutler 20'; Phillips 31' (o.g.)	Stadium: Layer Road; Attendance: 1,356; Referee: I Hemley

28 March 1986 35	Colchester United	1–1	Swindon Town	Colchester
19:30 GMT	Tony English 54'	Report	Bamber 62'	Stadium: Layer Road; Attendance: 2,997; Referee: Alan Gunn

31 March 1986 36	Peterborough United	1–2	Colchester United	Peterborough
	Fuccillo 29'	Report	Tony English 6'; Baker 84'	Stadium: London Road Stadium; Attendance: 2,316; Referee: M Reed

4 April 1986 37	Colchester United	2–3	Chester City	Colchester
19:30 BST	Tommy English 57', 62' (pen.)	Report	Johnson 3'; Glenn 30'; Greenough 62'	Stadium: Layer Road; Attendance: 2,281; Referee: D Reeves

8 April 1986 38	Colchester United	4–0	Orient	Colchester
	Ferguson 17'; Day 33'; Phillips 66'; Tony English 78'	Report		Stadium: Layer Road; Attendance: 1,771; Referee: J Holbrook

12 April 1986 39	Rochdale	3–3	Colchester United	Rochdale
	Baker 32' (o.g.); Taylor 50', 74' (pen.)	Report	Ferguson 20'; Farrell 76'; Tommy English 83' (pen.)	Stadium: Spotland Stadium; Attendance: 1,182; Referee: P Vanes

15 April 1986 40	Scunthorpe United	1–1	Colchester United	Scunthorpe
	Dixon 21'	Report	Ferguson 7'	Stadium: Old Showground; Attendance: 1,238; Referee: G Tyson

18 April 1986 41	Colchester United	4–0	Preston North End	Colchester
19:30 BST	Tommy English 30' (pen.), 75', 83' (pen.); Ferguson 78'	Report	Gibson (red card) 27'; Atkins (yellow card) 85' (red card)	Stadium: Layer Road; Attendance: 2,046; Referee: Tony Ward

22 April 1986 42	Colchester United	5–0	Peterborough United	Colchester
19:30 BST	Reeves 26'; Tommy English 64'; Tony English 66', 80', 89'	Report		Stadium: Layer Road; Attendance: 1,863; Referee: Martin Bodenham

26 April 1986 43	Crewe Alexandra	0–2	Colchester United	Crewe
	Blissett (red card) 66'	Report	Groves 25', 39'; Tommy English (red card) 66'; Tony English (red card) 66'	Stadium: Gresty Road; Attendance: 1,555; Referee: N Glover

29 April 1986 44	Cambridge United	1–3	Colchester United	Cambridge
	Crown 69' (pen.)	Report	Reeves 7'; Ferguson 14', 35'	Stadium: Abbey Stadium; Attendance: 3,115; Referee: G Napthine

2 May 1986 45	Colchester United	3–1	Hartlepool United	Colchester
19:30 BST	Ferguson 25'; Tommy English 89'; Tony English 90'; Groves (yellow card) 79' (red card)	Report	Hogan 7' (pen.)	Stadium: Layer Road; Attendance: 2,410; Referee: H Taylor

6 May 1986 46	Colchester United	2–2	Burnley	Colchester
19:30 BST	Groves 41'; Tommy English 80'	Report	Lawrence 62'; Devine 84'	Stadium: Layer Road; Attendance: 2,726; Referee: M Cotton

=== League Cup ===
21 August 1985 1st round 1st leg	Colchester United	2–3	Millwall	Colchester
18:30 BST	Bowen 12', 89'	Report	Lovell 7' (pen.), 10' (pen.); Fashanu 14'	Stadium: Layer Road; Attendance: 1,430

2 September 1985 1st round 2nd leg	Millwall	4–1	Colchester United	New Cross
	Lovell 9'; Lowndes 35'; Fashanu 72'; Leslie 80'	Report	Bowen 78' (pen.)	Stadium: The Den; Attendance: 3,330; Referee: J Bray
Note: Millwall won 7–3 on aggregate.

=== FA Cup ===
16 November 1985 1st round	Wycombe Wanderers	2–0	Colchester United	High Wycombe
	West 3'; Read 40'	Report		Stadium: Loakes Park; Attendance: 3,089; Referee: E Scales

=== Associate Members' Cup ===
Group 2
Team	Pld	W	D	L	GF	GA	GD	Pts
Northampton Town	2	2	0	0	5	2	+3	6
Colchester United	2	1	0	1	5	3	+2	3
Southend United	2	0	0	2	2	7	−5	0

14 January 1986 Preliminary round (southern section)	Colchester United	4–1	Southend United	Colchester
	Groves 12', 38', 39'; Adcock 29'	Report	Clark 47'	Stadium: Layer Road; Attendance: 1,364; Referee: J Moules

21 January 1986 Preliminary round (southern section)	Northampton Town	2–1	Colchester United	Northampton
	Schiavi 4'; Benjamin 82'	Report	Baker 36'	Stadium: County Ground; Attendance: 1,958; Referee: Gerald Ashby

== Squad statistics ==
=== Appearances and goals ===
No.	Pos	Nat	Player	Total		Fourth Division		FA Cup		League Cup		Football League Trophy	
No.	Pos	Nat	Player	Apps	Goals	Apps	Goals	Apps	Goals	Apps	Goals	Apps	Goals
	GK	(England) ENG	Alec Chamberlain	51	0	46	0	1	0	2	0	2	0
	DF	(England) ENG	Terry Baker	23	3	21	2	0	0	0	0	2	1
	DF	(England) ENG	Keith Day	32	5	30	5	0	0	2	0	0	0
	DF	(England) ENG	Tony English	50	11	45	11	1	0	2	0	2	0
	DF	(England) ENG	Kirk Game	6	0	3+1	0	1	0	0	0	0+1	0
	DF	(England) ENG	Rudi Hedman	44	3	38+1	3	1	0	2	0	2	0
	DF	(Scotland) SCO	Ian Phillips	41	2	37	2	0	0	2	0	2	0
	MF	(England) ENG	Andy Farrell	25	1	24	1	1	0	0	0	0	0
	MF	(England) ENG	John Reeves	27	4	24	4	1	0	2	0	0	0
	FW	(England) ENG	Tony Adcock	38	16	33	15	1	0	2	0	2	1
	FW	(England) ENG	Simon Burman	11	1	10+1	1	0	0	0	0	0	0
	FW	(England) ENG	Tommy English	24	10	16+7	10	0	0	0	0	0+1	0
	FW	(England) ENG	Mick Ferguson	10	7	9+1	7	0	0	0	0	0	0
	FW	(England) ENG	Perry Groves	47	15	42+1	12	1	0	1	0	2	3
Players who appeared for Colchester who left during the season
	DF	(Scotland) SCO	Stewart Houston	41	0	36	0	1	0	2	0	2	0
	MF	(England) ENG	Jeff Hull	5	0	4+1	0	0	0	0	0	0	0
	MF	(England) ENG	Roger Osborne	38	1	28+6	1	0	0	1+1	0	2	0
	MF	(England) ENG	Noel Parkinson	40	7	35	7	1	0	1+1	0	2	0
	FW	(Wales) WAL	Keith Bowen	17	8	15	5	0	0	2	3	0	0
	FW	(England) ENG	Russell Irving	10	0	2+7	0	0	0	1	0	0	0
	FW	(England) ENG	Robin Turner	14	0	6+5	0	1	0	0	0	2	0
	FW	(England) ENG	Trevor Whymark	2	0	2	0	0	0	0	0	0	0

=== Goalscorers ===
Place	Nationality	Position	Name	Fourth Division	FA Cup	League Cup	Football League Trophy	Total
1	(England)	FW	Tony Adcock	15	0	0	1	16
2	(England)	WG	Perry Groves	12	0	0	3	15
3	(England)	DF/MF	Tony English	11	0	0	0	11
4	(England)	FW	Tommy English	10	0	0	0	10
5	(Wales)	FW	Keith Bowen	5	0	3	0	8
6	(England)	FW	Mick Ferguson	7	0	0	0	7
6	(England)	MF	Noel Parkinson	7	0	0	0	7
8	(England)	CB	Keith Day	5	0	0	0	5
9	(England)	MF	John Reeves	4	0	0	0	4
10	(England)	CB	Terry Baker	2	0	0	1	3
10	(England)	CB	Rudi Hedman	3	0	0	0	3
12	(Scotland)	FB	Ian Phillips	2	0	0	0	2
13	(England)	WG/MF	Simon Burman	1	0	0	0	1
13	(England)	MF/FB	Andy Farrell	1	0	0	0	1
13	(England)	MF	Roger Osborne	1	0	0	0	1
			Own goals	2	0	0	0	2
			TOTALS	88	0	3	5	96

=== Disciplinary record ===
Nationality	Position	Name	Fourth Division		FA Cup		League Cup		Football League Trophy		Total	
Nationality	Position	Name	Booked	Sent off (straight red)	Booked	Sent off (straight red)	Booked	Sent off (straight red)	Booked	Sent off (straight red)	Booked	Sent off (straight red)
(England)	WG	Perry Groves	6	1	0	0	0	0	0	0	6	1
(England)	DF/MF	Tony English	2	1	0	0	0	0	0	0	2	1
(England)	FW	Tommy English	1	1	0	0	0	0	0	0	1	1
(England)	MF	John Reeves	4	0	0	0	0	0	0	0	4	0
(England)	CB	Keith Day	3	0	0	0	0	0	0	0	3	0
(England)	WG/MF	Simon Burman	3	0	0	0	0	0	0	0	2	0
(England)	MF/FB	Andy Farrell	2	0	0	0	0	0	0	0	2	0
(England)	MF	Noel Parkinson	2	0	0	0	0	0	0	0	2	0
(England)	FW	Tony Adcock	1	0	0	0	0	0	0	0	1	0
(Wales)	FW	Keith Bowen	1	0	0	0	0	0	0	0	1	0
(England)	FW	Mick Ferguson	1	0	0	0	0	0	0	0	1	0
(England)	CB	Rudi Hedman	1	0	0	0	0	0	0	0	1	0
		TOTALS	26	3	0	0	0	0	0	0	26	3

=== Clean sheets ===
Number of games goalkeepers kept a clean sheet.

Place	Nationality	Player	Fourth Division	FA Cup	League Cup	Football League Trophy	Total
1	(England)	Alec Chamberlain	10	0	0	0	10
		TOTALS	10	0	0	0	10

=== Player debuts ===
Players making their first-team Colchester United debut in a fully competitive match.

Position	Nationality	Player	Date	Opponent	Ground	Notes
MF	(England)	John Reeves	17 August 1985	Stockport County	Layer Road	
CB	(England)	Kirk Game	8 November 1985	Rochdale	Layer Road	
FW	(England)	Tommy English	9 November 1985	Rochdale	Layer Road	(Note: Second debut for the club)
FW	(England)	Robin Turner	8 November 1985	Rochdale	Layer Road	
FW	(England)	Trevor Whymark	23 November 1985	Preston North End	Deepdale	
FW	(England)	Robin Turner	20 December 1985	Wrexham	Layer Road	
CB	(England)	Terry Baker	11 January 1986	Torquay United	Layer Road	
FW	(England)	Mick Ferguson	31 March 1986	Peterborough United	London Road Stadium	

== See also ==
- List of Colchester United F.C. seasons
