= Stephen Grenfell =

Stephen Grenfell may refer to:

- Stephen Grenfell (broadcaster) (died 1989), writer and BBC Radio broadcaster
- Stephen Grenfell (footballer) (born 1966), English footballer
