= Simon Lowe (disambiguation) =

Simon Lowe is a British actor.

Simon Lowe may also refer to:

- Simon Lowe (footballer) (born 1962), English former footballer
- Simon Lowe (Ned's Declassified School Survival Guide)
- Simon Lowe (MP) (died 1578), MP for Stafford and New Shoreham
