= Warren Ward =

Warren Ward may refer to:

- Warren Ward (basketball) (born 1989), Canadian basketball player
- Warren Ward (footballer) (born 1962), English footballer
