= Stuart Slater =

English footballer

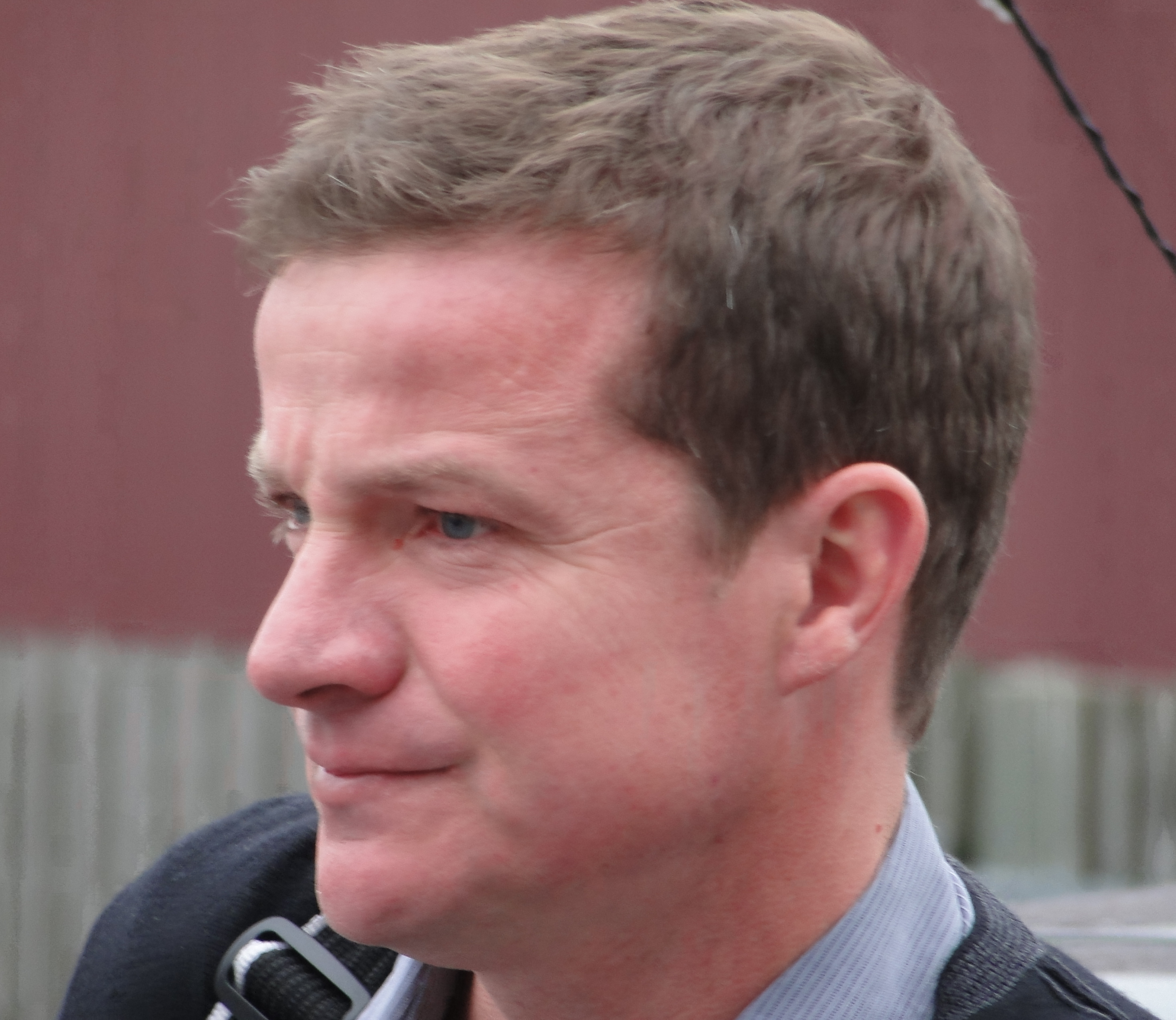

Personal information
- Full name: Stuart Ian Slater
- Date of birth: 27 March 1969 (age 57)
- Place of birth: Sudbury, Suffolk, England
- Height: 5 ft 9 in (1.75 m)
- Positions: Winger; forward

Youth career
- 1981–1986: West Ham United

Senior career*
Years	Team	Apps	(Gls)
1986–1992	West Ham United	141	(11)
1992–1993	Celtic	43	(3)
1993–1996	Ipswich Town	72	(4)
1996	Leicester City	0	(0)
1996–1999	Watford	30	(1)
1999–2000	Carlton	25	(0)
2000–2001	Forest Green Rovers	21	(1)
2001	Aberystwyth Town	7	(1)
2003–2004	Weston-super-Mare	35	(2)
2009	Wivenhoe Town	0	(0)
Total		374	(23)

International career
1990	England U21	3	(0)
1991	England B	2	(0)
- * Club domestic league appearances and goals

Stuart Ian Slater (born 27 March 1969) is an English football coach and former professional footballer.

He played as a winger and forward from 1986 to 2009, notably played for West Ham United, Celtic, Ipswich Town, Leicester City and Watford, as well as representing England at under-21 and B level. Later on in his career he played for Carlton, Forest Green Rovers, Aberystwyth Town, Weston-super-Mare and Wivenhoe Town.

He later moved into coaching and has held roles at West Ham United as Academy Director before a spell as a youth team coach at Chelmsford City.

== Club career ==
=== West Ham United ===
Slater joined West Ham as an apprentice in 1986 and after a tough first year, he became a star of the youth team. He made his first appearance for West Ham, still an apprentice, when he came on as substitute for Ray Stewart in the Division One home game against Derby County in October 1987. He was offered a professional contract in April 1988 just after his seventeenth birthday and made a second appearance in the 1987–88 season when he came on as substitute in the home game against Coventry City in the same month.

He made his first start for West Ham against Southampton in August 1988, when a clash of heads with Russell Osman led to him being taken off in the first minute. He recovered to win the Man of the Match award in his next two games, against Charlton and Newcastle United, and scored his first goal for the club in a F.A. Cup 5th round tie against Charlton in February 1989. Playing in Division Two in 1989–90, he scored nine goals in 50 league and cup appearances as West Ham reached the semi-final of the League Cup, and made three substitute appearances for the England Under 21 team in 1990.

Manager Billy Bonds switched him to the left wing towards the end of the 1989–90 season where he excelled to the extent that after a 5–0 home defeat of Sheffield United in March 1990, the Sheffield United defender, Chris Wilder, shook Slater's hand, saying, "That's the closest I've been to you all evening." A similar performance came against Everton in the sixth-round of the FA Cup in March 1991, when he also scored West Ham's second goal from 20 yards, as West Ham won 2–1 to reach the semi-finals. West Ham returned to Division One in 1991–92 but, troubled by an Achilles injury, Slater failed to score a goal in 51 appearances. He turned down the offer of a new contract and left the club in August 1992 for Celtic.

=== Celtic ===
Former West Ham teammate, Liam Brady, then manager of Celtic, took Slater to Glasgow in a £1.5 million deal in August 1992. Slater made his debut in the same month, coming on as a substitute in a 1–1 away draw against Rangers, but did not make an impression at Celtic and thirteen months later he returned south to Ipswich Town, having scored three goals in 43 appearances.

=== Ipswich Town ===
He joined Ipswich Town in a £750,000 deal in September 1993, where he linked up again with his former manager at West Ham, John Lyall, in the Premier League. He stayed at Ipswich for three seasons scoring four goals in 84 appearances before leaving on a free transfer.

=== Later career ===
After a short spell on trial at Leicester City, Slater joined Watford. Injuries limited him to only 35 league appearances for the Watford in almost three years and he eventually moved to Australia, joining NSL club, Carlton S.C., in August 1999.

Slater returned to England a year later to join Football Conference club Forest Green Rovers in October 2000, for whom he made 24 league and cup appearances in the 2000–01 season and played in the FA Trophy final at Villa Park in May 2001, when Rovers were beaten 1–0 by Canvey Island.

He was unable to agree a new contract with Rovers and followed manager Frank Gregan to League of Wales side Aberystwyth Town in July 2001. Poor results in the first months of the 2001–02 season saw Frank Gregan depart and Slater follow him to Southern League club, Weston-super-Mare, in December 2001, where he stayed for the next three years, helping Weston-super-Mare to promotion to the Southern League Premier Division in 2003.

He played his final game for Weston-super-Mare in a 1–1 draw, in which he scored, at Bishop Stortford in October 2004. In January 2009, Slater joined Wivenhoe Town, managed by his former West Ham teammate, Julian Dicks, but never made an appearance for the team.

== Coaching career ==
Slater became football coach having achieved the UEFA 'B' licence and has been a coach/manager at the Youth Academy of West Ham United and remains a club ambassador at 1st team games to this day. He also has many years experience as a secondary school P.E. Teacher at Kings Langley School.

Slater later oversaw a full-time squad of under-19 Apprentices at Chelmsford City along with former Southend United and Colchester United player Kirk Game. The club has partnered Chelmsford College and formed a football programme called SOCA (Soccer Opportunities and Coaching Academy) that helps develop talented young footballers and coaches, giving them a chance to develop their skills at recognised clubs and organisations whilst also gaining top coaching and educational qualifications.

== Honours ==
Watford

- Football League Second Division: 1997–98

== Sources ==
Northcutt, John; Roy Shoesmith (1993). West Ham United A Complete Record. Derby: Breedon Books Publishing Company. p. 151. ISBN 1-873626-44-4.
Blows, Kirk; Ben Sharratt (2002). Claret and Blue Blood. Mainstream Publishing (Edinburgh) Ltd. pp. 190–194. ISBN 1-84018-489-2.
Northcutt, John (2003). The Definitive West Ham United F.C. Soccerdata. pp. 103–107. ISBN 1-899468-19-6.
"Stuart Slater". Soccerbase. Racing Post.
