= Darren Angell =

English footballer

Personal information
- Full name: Darren James Angell
- Date of birth: 19 January 1967 (age 59)
- Place of birth: Marlborough, England
- Height: 6 ft 2 in (1.88 m)
- Position: Central defender

Youth career
- Reading

Senior career*
Years	Team	Apps	(Gls)
- Newbury Town
1985–1988	Portsmouth	0	(0)
1987	→ Colchester United (loan)	1	(0)
- Cheltenham Town
- Lincoln City
- Barnet
- Hungerford Town
1994	Aldershot Town	15	(2)
Total		16	(2)

Managerial career
- Kintbury Rangers
- 2008: Newbury
- * Club domestic league appearances and goals

Darren James Angell (born 19 January 1967) is an English former footballer who played as a defender in the Football League. He made only one Football League appearance for Colchester United, on loan from Portsmouth where he made no first team appearances. He later went on to play for a host of non-league clubs, before stepping into management with Kintbury Rangers and Newbury.

== Playing career ==
Born in Marlborough, Angell began his career at Reading but failed to break into the first team and was subsequently released, moving to non-league Newbury Town. He was picked up by Portsmouth in June 1985, but again did not make an appearance, before being loaned to Colchester United in December 1987. He made his Colchester and Football League debut on 18 December in a 2–0 win over Tranmere Rovers but he lasted just 35 minutes, limping off after suffering knee ligament damage.

Following his release from Portsmouth in 1988, Angell played 12 games in the Conference for Cheltenham Town, just as his brother Brett was leaving Whaddon Road for Derby County. He had a short spell with Lincoln City at the beginning of the 1988–89 season before playing for Barnet for 20 Conference games. He joined Hungerford Town and then Aldershot Town before retiring from playing through injury.

== Managerial career ==
After retiring from playing, he joined the coaching staff at Hungerford Town where he had played prior to signing for Aldershot. He then took the managerial position at Kintbury Rangers and in 2008 became joint manager of Newbury.

== Personal life ==
Angell's younger brother, Brett, was also a professional footballer, playing for a variety of Football League clubs, most notably for Stockport County, Southend United, Everton and Walsall.
