= Keith Gorman =

English footballer

Personal information
- Full name: Keith Gorman
- Date of birth: 13 October 1966 (age 60)
- Place of birth: Bishop Auckland, England
- Height: 5 ft 10 in (1.78 m)
- Position: Winger

Youth career
- 1982–1984: Ipswich Town

Senior career*
Years	Team	Apps	(Gls)
1984–1987	Ipswich Town	0	(0)
1986	→ Colchester United (loan)	1	(0)
1986	→ Northampton Town (loan)	0	(0)
1987	Darlington	7	(2)
- Brandon United
- West Auckland Town
Total		8	(2)
- * Club domestic league appearances and goals

Keith Gorman (born 13 October 1966) is an English former footballer who played in the Football League as a winger for Colchester United, on loan from Ipswich Town, and for Darlington.

== Career ==
Gorman was born in Bishop Auckland, but began his career as a youth with Ipswich Town in 1982. He was prolific during his youth spell with the club, scoring 59 goals in 41 appearances. He turned professional at the club in 1984, and played one reserve-team game, also scoring in that game.

He signed for Colchester United on loan from Ipswich in September 1986. He made one substitute appearance, his Football League debut, on 3 October at home to Wrexham, coming on for Nicky Chatterton who had dislocated his shoulder; Colchester won 2–1.

On his return to Ipswich, Gorman failed to break into the first-team squad, and joined Darlington permanently in January 1987. He made seven appearances for Darlington, scoring twice, during the latter half of the 1986–87 season. He later played for Brandon United and West Auckland Town.
