= Marlow United F.C. =

Association football club in England

Coordinates: 51°36′15.36″N 0°42′43.79″W

Marlow United
- Full name: Marlow United Football Club
- Nickname: The Flying Blues
- Founded: 1977
- Ground: Hedsor Social Club
- Chairman: Daniel Carvell
- Manager: Ashok Sharma
- 2025–26: Thames Valley Premier League Division One, 6th of 12
Home colours

Marlow United Football Club is a football club based in Marlow, Buckinghamshire, England. They were established in 1977 and were among the founding members of the Reading Football League in 1989.

== History ==
The club was formed in 1977 and started in division 5 of the Wycombe & District Football League for the 1977–78 season. The following season they were promoted to the second division, but at the end of the season United were expelled from the league due to the other member clubs voting the team out of the league. Marlow then joined the Pages East Berks Football League for the 1979–80 season. United returned to the Wycombe League in 1982–83, playing in the First Division. They remained in the First division until they were promoted as champions to the Senior Division in the 1984–85 season.

For the 1987–88 season United decided to leave the Wycombe & District Football League to join the Premier Division of the then Reading & District Football League. One season later United won promotion as runners up to the senior division. The Reading & District Football League & Reading Combination amalgamated and in 1990 became known as the Reading Football League with its Senior Division taking on Step 7 status in the FA National League System. Marlow United became joint founder members of this league. In 2004–05 they went on to become the only side from Buckinghamshire to ever win the Reading Football League championship.

At the end of the 2005–06 season United finished runners-up in the Senior Division and gained promotion to the Division One East of the Hellenic League, which was made possible two years previous when they embarked on a ground share agreement with Flackwell Heath FC, leaving their original home of Gossmore Lane. United created yet another first in the club's history when in the 2006–07 season as they made a historic first ever appearance in the FA Vase, seeing them triumph over Wessex League Premier team Bournemouth FC by 2–1 in front of a crowd of 161. Although United were to lose 2–1 in the next round they still earned the accolade of 'FA Vase team of the round' for their giant killing exploits over Bournemouth FC. The 2007–08 season saw United make their first ever appearance in the FA Cup, a 2–1 defeat to Cove, and in promotion to the Hellenic Premier division.

United stayed in the premier division until the end of the 2009–10 season, where they withdrew from the Hellenic league, for financial reasons and joined the Reading Football League again, playing in the Premier division. With the return to the Reading league United also moved to playing their games at Bisham Abbey National Sports Centre. The following season the Club gained promotion to the Senior Division of the Reading league. During season 2013/14 United reached both the BTC Senior Cup final beating South Reading 2-0 and the Reading Senior Cup Final losing 2–1 to Wokingham & Emmbrook both games being played at the Madejski Stadium. The Reading Football League renamed itself the Thames Valley Premier League so as to retain its step 7 status for the 2014/15 season. This was particularly poignant for United as they won the inaugural Thames Valley Premier League title along with the BTC Senior Cup beating AFC Aldermaston 2–1 at the Madejski Stadium to record the 'double'. Both 2015/16 and 2016/17 seasons saw United finish league runners up, while they also reached the Berks & Bucks FA Intermediate Cup Final losing 2–1 to Woodley United at Larges Lane where they returned to contest the 2017/18 Berks & Bucks FA Senior Trophy Final but again losing this time 3–1 to Saxton Rovers. A league position of 6th place was largely due to game postponements due to weather conditions and agreed shared points at the end of the season.

The 2018–19 season saw the club win the Thames Valley Premier League and the BTS senior cup. The Club almost made the final of the Berks and Bucks Senior Cup that season, beating Slough Town 1–0 in the semi-final, but were removed from the competition after two players were found to have played in other FA County competitions. The league success saw the club gain promotion to division One east of the Hellenic League.

On 1 April 2020, Marlow United announced that they would resign from the Hellenic Football League and request to return to the Thames Valley Premier Football League at step seven due to financial difficulties. However, they also left the Thames Valley Premier after just a single season, folding in 2021.

== Ground ==
Marlow United ground share at the Alfred Davis Memorial Ground, Oak Tree Road, Marlow which is the home of Marlow FC.

Their highest attendance is 250 which was enjoyed this season at the Alfred Davis v Cookham Dean.

== Honours ==
=== League honours ===
- Thames Valley Premier League
  - Winners (2) 2014–15, 2018–19
  - Runners Up (2) 2015–16, 2016–17
- Hellenic Football League Division One East:
  - Runners-up (1): 2007–08
- Reading Football League Senior Division:
  - Winners (2): 2004–05, 2014–15
  - Runners-up (1): 2005–06
- Reading Football League Premier Division:
  - Winners (1): 1999–00
  - Runners-up (1): 1989–90
- Wycombe & District Football League:
  - Winners (1): 1984–85
  - Runners Up : 1985–86
- Wycombe & District Football League Division One:
  - Winners (1): 1983–84
- East Berks Football League:
  - Winners (1): 1979–80
  - Runners Up (1) : 1981–82

=== Cup honours ===
- Berks & Bucks FA Senior Trophy
- Runners Up (3) : 2016–17, 2017–18, 2018–19
- Hellenic League Floodlit Cup
  - Winners (1): 2008–09
- Reading Senior Cup
  - Winners (1): 2007–08
  - Runners-up (3): 2005–06, 2006–07, 2012–13
- Wycombe Senior Cup:
  - Winners (2): 1994–95, 1995–96
  - Runners Up (1) : 1985–86
- Maidenhead Senior Cup:
  - Winners (1): 1987–88
- BTC Senior Cup:
  - Winners (3): 2012–13, 2014–15, 2018–19
  - Runners Up (2) : 1999–00, 2004–05
- Wycombe & District Football League Cup:
  - Winners (1): 1985–86
- Berks & Bucks F.A. Junior Cup:
  - Winners (1): 1979–80

== Records ==
- Highest League Position: 18th in Hellenic League Premier Division: 2008–09
- FA Cup Best Performance: Preliminary Round: 2008–09
- FA Vase Best Performance: First Round: 2007–08
- Highest attendances:161 vs Bournemouth FC on 16 September 2006 250 v Cookham Dean on 13 October 2018.
