= Lee Hunter (footballer) =

English footballer (born 1969)

Personal information
- Full name: Lee Hunter
- Date of birth: 5 October 1969 (age 57)
- Place of birth: Oldham, England
- Height: 5 ft 10 in (1.78 m)
- Position: Winger

Youth career
- Colchester United

Senior career*
| Years | Team | Apps | (Gls) |
| 1987–1989 | Colchester United | 9 | (0) |
- Wigan Athletic
| 1990-1993 | Wivenhoe Town | 117 | (2) |
| | Hendon | 16 | (0) |
- Chelmsford City
- Boreham Wood
- Braintree Town
- Diss Town
- Clacton Town
- Maldon Town
- * Club domestic league appearances and goals

Lee Hunter (born 5 October 1969) is an English former footballer who played in the Football League as a winger for Colchester United.

== Career ==
Born in Oldham, Hunter signed for Colchester United as an apprentice from the club's youth team, making his first-team debut at Layer Road on 6 May 1988 in a 0–0 draw with Tranmere Rovers, a match in which he started. He made nine appearances for the club in the Football League, starting five and coming on as a substitute on four occasions. He played his final game for the club on 21 April 1989 in a 1–1 home draw with Carlisle United, coming on for Stuart Hicks. He would later play for Wivenhoe Town, Wigan Athletic, Hendon, Chelmsford City, Boreham Wood, Braintree Town, Braintree Town, Clacton Town and Maldon Town.
