= Nigel Saddington =

English footballer (1965–2019)

Personal information
- Full name: Nigel Saddington
- Date of birth: 9 December 1965
- Place of birth: Sunderland, England
- Date of death: 24 January 2019 (aged 53)
- Height: 6 ft 1 in (1.85 m)
- Position: Defender

Senior career*
Years	Team	Apps	(Gls)
1984–1985	Doncaster Rovers	6	(0)
1986–1988	Sunderland	3	(0)
1988–1991	Carlisle United	97	(15)
1991–1992	Gateshead	17	(0)
Total		123	(15)
- * Club domestic league appearances and goals

Nigel Saddington (9 December 1965 – 24 January 2019) was an English professional footballer who played as a defender in the Football League for Doncaster Rovers, Sunderland and Carlisle United and in non-League football for Gateshead.

== Career ==
Saddington was born in Sunderland, Tyne and Wear and started his career with amateur sides Coles and SC Vaux before signing for Football League Third Division side Doncaster Rovers, in September 1984. He dropped back into non-league football with Roker but in January 1986, he was signed by Lawrie McMenemy for his hometown club Sunderland who played in the Second Division. He did not make his debut until September 1986, in a Football League Trophy win over Barnsley and only made five appearances in all competitions for the club. In February 1988, he signed for Fourth Division side Carlisle United, was later made club captain by manager Clive Middlemass and also went on to play over a hundred games for the club. He left Carlisle in 1991 after he had been diagnosed with M.E., aged 25, and dropped into non-league football when he joined Football Conference side Gateshead. He made 17 league appearances for the club during the 1991–92 season.

== Later life ==
Following his retirement from professional football, he later became a car salesman in the North East. Saddington died on 24 January 2019 aged 53 from heart disease.
