= John Reeves (footballer, born 1963) =

English footballer and manager

Personal information
- Full name: John Charles Reeves
- Date of birth: 8 July 1963 (age 63)
- Place of birth: Hackney, London, England
- Height: 5 ft 7 in (1.70 m)
- Position: Midfielder

Youth career
- 1979–1981: Fulham

Senior career*
Years	Team	Apps	(Gls)
1981–1985	Fulham	14	(0)
1985–1988	Colchester United	61	(7)
1988–1989	Enfield		
- Diss Town
- Los Angeles Heat
- Cornard United
- Halstead Town

Managerial career
- 2007–2008: F.C. Clacton (joint manager)
- * Club domestic league appearances and goals

John Charles Reeves (born 8 July 1963) is an English former football player and manager who played in the Football League as a midfielder for Fulham and Colchester United. He was also briefly joint-manager of F.C. Clacton.

== Playing career ==
Born in Hackney, London, Reeves joined Fulham as an apprentice in July 1979, signing professional terms in 1981 and made his first-team debut in January 1982. He broke his arm during the 1983–84 season and struggled to earn a place in the squad, making 17 appearances in total, including 14 league games.

Reeves was signed by Cyril Lea at Colchester United following his release from Fulham in August 1985, making his debut on the opening day of the 1985–86 season in a 3–1 win over Stockport County. He scored his first goal for the club one week after his debut in a 2–1 defeat to Wrexham at the Racecourse Ground and scored a further six goals during his time with Colchester. He dislocated his arm during a game against Crewe Alexandra in October 1986, but still made 61 league appearances during three years with the U's before he was released by manager Roger Brown in 1988.

Conference side Enfield signed Reeves for the 1988–89 season and later joined Diss Town. He briefly left for the United States to play for Los Angeles Heat before returning to regional football with Cornard United and Halstead Town.

== Managerial career ==
In the summer of 2007, Reeves was named as joint-manager of F.C. Clacton following the club's name change from Clacton Town, managing alongside David Coyle, helping run the club during their first season in its new guise. The club finished the season 10th in the First Division of the Eastern Counties League. Reeves reverted to his former role as physio towards the end of the 2007–08 season.
