= Newbury F.C. =

Association football club in England

Coordinates: 51°24′08.28″N 1°19′01.74″W

Newbury Town
- Full name: Newbury Town Football Club
- Nickname: The Town
- Founded: 2002
- Ground: Faraday Road
- Capacity: At least 628 including seats for 40 and covered standing for about 100
- Chairman: Danny Langford
- Manager: Devonn Reid (player/manager)
- League: Thames Valley Premier League
- 2025–26: Thames Valley Premier League Premier Division, 7th of 15
- Website: newburytown.com
Home colours

Newbury Town Football Club are a football club based in Newbury, Berkshire, England. They are currently members of the Thames Valley Premier League and play their homes games at Faraday Road.

== History ==
The club was originally formed in 2002 as Old London Apprentice, and entered into the Reading League Division 4, winning it in its debut season. In the next two years, the club had won successive promotions and this culminated in arriving in Division 1 of the Reading League. They were then renamed O.L.A. Newbury in 2005.

With pretty much the same squad, the club then won the Division 1 title and was asked to compete in the Reading Senior league, jumping a division, and having led the league for most of the season, and going 17 games unbeaten, the club finished second in the league on the final day of the season, in game at Cookham Dean in which promotion was secured.

By this point, A.F.C. Newbury had folded, and in 2007, the club was renamed Newbury and took over AFC's youth teams.

They joined the Hellenic Football League in 2008 and started in Division One East. Newbury became champions of Division one east in the 2011–12 season and won promotion to the Premier Division.

At the end of the 2014–15 season the club resigned from the Hellenic league for financial reasons and joined the Thames Valley Premier Football League.

Newbury won the 2018/19 Thames Valley Premier League Division One, collecting a total of 53 points from 20 games. Their final game of the season was a 7–2 home win against Eldon Celtic.

On 1 July 2019, Karl Curtis was announced as the new first team coach, taking over from Danny Langford who led the team to the Thames Valley Premier League Division One title and promotion in 2018/19.

Newbury made a positive start to the 2019/20 season, winning their first five games in the Thames Valley Premier League. Due to the Coronavirus pandemic all football below the National League was ended on 26 March 2020 and all results for the 2019/20 season were expunged. At the time of the decision, Newbury sat in sixth place in the Thames Valley Premier League (Premier Division) having collected 26 points from 13 games.

On 10 July 2021, the club announced Nicky Voller as the new manager of the first team, taking over from Rocky Rowbottom and Carl Jenner. John Goddard was named as the assistant manager.

Following the restructure of the non-league football pyramid, Newbury FC were transferred to the Hellenic League Division Two South for the 2021/22 season.

Newbury were promoted to the Thames Valley Premier League for the 2024/25 Season and returned to Faraday Road Football Ground as their home ground from 9 November.

On 10 June 2026, Devonn Reid was appointed as manager, having previously achieved two consecutive trebles with Westwood Wanderers, with former manager Carl Jenner becoming assistant manager. A development side was also announced before the start of the 2026/27 season, with the intention of providing a pathway from youth sports to the first team, as well as a partnership with local youth side AFC Newbury.

== Ground ==
Between 1963 and 2016, Newbury played at Faraday Road in Newbury. For the 2019–20 season, they moved to Henwick Worthy Sports Ground in Thatcham. Beginning in 2021, the club play their home games at Lambourn Sports Club.

On 14 August 2021, the buildings at the club's former ground in Faraday Road were destroyed by fire.

On 9 November 2024, Newbury FC returned to Faraday Road Football Ground, after an 8 year campaign, led by Newbury Community Football Group (NCFG).

In 2026, an additional stand was erected and further upgrades were undertaken as a part of the club's application for promotion. In October of that year, floodlights were reinstalled at Faraday Road, with Newbury's first game under floodlights in a decade resulting in a 4-0 win against Burghfield, in front of a crowd of 628.

== Players ==
As of 14 November 2026

=== Current squad ===
Note: Flags indicate national team as defined under FIFA eligibility rules; some limited exceptions apply. Players may hold more than one non-FIFA nationality.

| No. | Pos. | Nation | Player |
|---|---|---|---|
| — | GK | | Iain McCulley |
| — | GK | | Jack North |
| — | GK | | Steven Fairchild |
| — | DF | | Calum Donald |
| — | DF | | Devonn Reid (player/manager) |
| — | DF | | Jack Clift |
| — | DF | | Jamie Porter |
| — | DF | | Ollie Hall |
| — | DF | | Riley Cannell |
| — | DF | | Sam Mulvey |
| — | DF | | Theo Pennicott-Bowen |
| — | DF | | Zach Pettifer |
| — | MF | | Chad Abrams |
| — | MF | | Jay Welch |

| No. | Pos. | Nation | Player |
|---|---|---|---|
| — | MF | | Joe McQuilkin |
| — | MF | | Jordan Cox |
| — | MF | | Stan Jefferies |
| — | MF | | Zak Barnett |
| — | FW | | George Armstrong |
| — | FW | | Harrison Luffrum |
| — | FW | | Jake Allan |
| — | FW | | Jordace Spooner |
| — | FW | | Matt Bustin |
| — | FW | | Ollie Brown |
| — | FW | | Rocco Sofroniou |
| — | FW | | Sam Poulter |
| — | FW | | Will Frank |

== Honours ==
- Thames Valley Premier League Division One
  - Champions 2018/19
- Hellenic Football League Division One East
  - Champions 2011–12
- Reading Senior league
  - Runners-up 2007–08
- Reading Senior league Division One
  - Champions 2006–07
- Thames Valley Premier League Division One
  - Runners Up 2023/24

== Records ==
- FA Cup
  - Preliminary Round 2011–12
- FA Vase
  - Second Round 2012–13
