= Martin Lambert =

English footballer

Martin Lambert (born 24 September 1965) is an English former professional footballer who played as a forward. He played four times for England U17s scoring two goals and twice for England Youths scoring three goals.
