= Colin Fielder =

English footballer

Personal information
- Full name: Colin Michael Raynor Fielder
- Date of birth: 5 January 1964 (age 62)
- Place of birth: Winchester, England
- Height: 5 ft 8 in (1.73 m)
- Position: Midfielder

Senior career*
Years	Team	Apps	(Gls)
1981–1987	Aldershot	68	(8)
1987–1991	Farnborough Town		
1991–1992	Slough Town		
1992–1996	Woking		
1996–1998	Yeovil Town		
1999–2002	Aldershot Town		
- * Club domestic league appearances and goals

Colin Michael Raynor Fielder (born 5 January 1964) is an English former footballer who played for Aldershot Town, Farnborough Town, Slough Town, Woking and Yeovil Town. During his career he played as a midfielder.

== Honours ==
Aldershot

- Football League Fourth Division play-offs: 1987

Woking

- FA Trophy: 1993–94, 1994–95
