= Ian McInnes =

Scottish footballer

Personal information
- Full name: Ian McInnes
- Date of birth: 22 March 1967 (age 59)
- Place of birth: Hamilton, Scotland
- Height: 5 ft 8 in (1.73 m)
- Position: Right winger

Senior career*
Years	Team	Apps	(Gls)
1983–1986	Rotherham United	9	(0)
1985–1987	Lincoln City	43	(4)
1987–1989	Kilmarnock	39	(4)
1988–1990	Stranraer	59	(4)
1990–1996	Stirling Albion	199	(26)
1996–1998	Albion Rovers	22	(0)
1997–1998	→ Stranraer (loan)	5	(0)
–2000	Cumnock Juniors		
2000–2003	East Kilbride Thistle		
- * Club domestic league appearances and goals

Ian McInnes (born 22 March 1967) is a Scottish former footballer. He played as a right winger for Rotherham United and Lincoln City in the Football League before representing Kilmarnock, Stranraer, Stirling Albion and Albion Rovers in the Scottish Football League.
