= Mark Walton (footballer) =

Welsh footballer (born 1969)

Personal information
- Full name: Mark Andrew Walton
- Date of birth: 1 June 1969 (age 57)
- Place of birth: Merthyr Tydfil, Wales
- Height: 6 ft 2 in (1.88 m)
- Position: Goalkeeper

Youth career
- Swansea City

Senior career*
Years	Team	Apps	(Gls)
1987	Luton Town		
1987–1989	Colchester United	40	(0)
1989–1993	Norwich City	22	(0)
1993	→ Wrexham (loan)	6	(0)
1994	→ Dundee United (loan)	0	(0)
1994	Bolton Wanderers	3	(0)
1994	Wroxham		
1994	Merthyr Tydfil		
1995	Barry Town		
1996	Fakenham Town		
1996–1998	Fulham	40	(0)
1998	Gillingham	1	(0)
1998	→ Norwich City (loan)	0	(0)
1998–2000	Brighton & Hove Albion	58	(0)
2000–2003	Cardiff City	40	(0)
2004–?	Bentleigh Greens		
Total		210	(0)

International career
1991	Wales U21	1	(0)
- * Club domestic league appearances and goals

Mark Andrew Walton (born 1 June 1969) is a Welsh former professional footballer. He was a goalkeeper who played for Luton Town, Colchester United, Norwich City, Wrexham, Dundee United, Bolton Wanderers, Fulham, Gillingham and Brighton & Hove Albion.

After leaving Bolton Wanderers in 1994 he spent two years playing for various non-league sides before signing for Fulham. He left Brighton in 2000 to sign for Cardiff City on a free transfer where he spent three years. While with Norwich, Walton played the FA Cup semi-final against Sunderland in 1992.

Walton moved to Australia in 2004 to play for Bentleigh Greens.

== Honours ==
With Cardiff City

- FAW Premier Cup winner: 1

2001–02
