= Sean Norman =

English footballer

Personal information
- Full name: Sean Norman
- Date of birth: 27 November 1966 (age 59)
- Place of birth: Lowestoft, England
- Height: 5 ft 6 in (1.68 m)
- Position: Midfielder

Senior career*
Years	Team	Apps	(Gls)
- Lowestoft Town
1986–1987	Colchester United	22	(1)
- Wycombe Wanderers
- Wealdstone
- Chesham United
- Papatoetoe
- Chertsey Town
- Chesham United
- Lowestoft Town
Total		22	(1)

International career
1989	England C		
- * Club domestic league appearances and goals

Sean Norman (born 27 November 1966) is an English former footballer who played in the Football League as a midfielder for Colchester United.

== Career ==
Born in Lowestoft, Norman began his playing career with local club Lowestoft Town before joining Colchester United, playing regularly in the reserve team. He made his first-team debut on 23 August 1986 in the opening game of the season, a 3–1 defeat at Lincoln City, coming on as a substitute for Keith Day. He scored one league goal for the club in appearances, his goal the equaliser in a 1–1 draw with Tranmere Rovers on 23 January 1987. Following the sacking of manager Mike Walker, Norman found first-team games hard to come by as he scored his final goal in his final game for the club, a 3–2 win at Layer Road against Peterborough United in the Associate Members Cup on 13 October 1987.

Norman would later join non-league club Wycombe Wanderers for the remainder of the 1987–88 season, where he made 78 appearances during a two-year spell with the club, also earning England semi-professional honours in 1989.

Following his time with Wycombe, Norman joined Wealdstone before signing for Chesham United for £25,000. He later played in New Zealand for Papatoetoe, though he later returned to England, featuring for Chertsey Town, a second spell with Chesham and reconvened with former club Lowestoft.
