= Dale White (footballer) =

English footballer

Personal information
- Full name: Dale White
- Date of birth: 17 March 1968 (age 58)
- Place of birth: Sunderland, England
- Height: 5 ft 10 in (1.78 m)
- Position: Forward

Senior career*
Years	Team	Apps	(Gls)
1986–1988	Sunderland	4	(0)
1987–1988	→ Peterborough United (loan)	14	(4)
1988–1989	Melbourne Knights		
1989–1992	Gateshead		
1992–199?	Wollongong City		
- * Club domestic league appearances and goals

Dale White (born 17 March 1968) is an English former professional footballer who played as a forward for Sunderland.
