= Terry Baker (footballer) =

English footballer (born 1965)

Personal information
- Full name: Terence Baker
- Date of birth: 13 November 1965 (age 61)
- Place of birth: Rochford, England
- Height: 5 ft 11 in (1.80 m)
- Position: Central defender

Youth career
- West Ham United

Senior career*
Years	Team	Apps	(Gls)
1983–1984	West Ham United	0	(0)
1984–1985	Billericay Town		
1985–1988	Colchester United	55	(2)
- Billericay Town
Total		55	(2)
- * Club domestic league appearances and goals

Terence Baker (born 13 November 1965) is an English former footballer who played as a central defender in the Football League for Colchester United.

== Career ==
Born in Rochford, Baker began his career with West Ham United, where he signed professional terms in 1983 following his apprenticeship. He failed to break into the first-team, joining Billericay Town on his release. Colchester United manager Cyril Lea resurrected his career in bringing Baker to Layer Road in November 1985. He got his first chance of first-team football in January 1986 when Keith Day dislocated his shoulder, as he went on to start in a 0–0 draw with Torquay United on 11 January.

Baker scored the first of his two league goals on 31 January in a 2–2 draw with Halifax Town at The Shay, ten days after scoring his first goal in a 2–1 Associate Members Cup defeat to Northampton Town. His second league goal came in a 2–1 away victory against Peterborough United on 31 March.

Baker found his chances harder to come by when manager Mike Walker brought in experienced former Arsenal player Colin Hill. He played his last game for Colchester on 2 January 1988 in a 2–0 defeat to Peterborough at London Road. Having made 55 appearances for the U's, Baker was released and returned to his former club Billericay Town.
