= Mark Crowe (footballer) =

English footballer

Personal information
- Full name: Mark Anthony Crowe
- Date of birth: 11 December 1965 (age 60)
- Place of birth: Southwold, England
- Height: 5 ft 10 in (1.78 m)
- Position: Central defender

Youth career
- –1982: Norwich City

Senior career*
| Years | Team | Apps | (Gls) |
| 1982–1985 | Norwich City | 1 | (0) |
| 1985–1986 | Torquay United | 57 | (2) |
| 1986–1988 | Cambridge United | 51 | (0) |
- * Club domestic league appearances and goals

Mark Anthony Crowe (born 11 December 1965) is an English former professional footballer.

== Career ==
Crowe, a central defender, began his career as an apprentice with Norwich City and was captain of the Norwich youth team that won the FA Youth Cup in 1983. He made his league debut, whilst still an apprentice, playing as a late substitute in a match against Brighton & Hove Albion in December 1982. He turned professional the following month, but that one appearance was his only game for the Norwich first team.

Crowe joined Torquay United on a free transfer in July 1985, scoring twice in 57 games for the Gulls, before a move to Cambridge United in December 1986. He played 51 times for Cambridge before moving into non-league football, playing for Watton and Thetford Town before joining Wroxham. In the 1999 close season, Crowe joined Lowestoft Town as player-coach, though notwithstanding a legal challenge from Wroxham who still held his registration, and who Mark still had 2 years left on his contract with. Eventually an FA ruling provided in Lowestoft's favour.

Crowe joined Kirkley in the 2003 close season.

== Sources ==
- Mark Davage; John Eastwood; Kevin Platt (2001). Canary Citizens. Jarrold Publishing. ISBN 0-7117-2020-7.
