= Scott Daniels (footballer) =

English footballer

Personal information
- Full name: Scott Charles Daniels
- Date of birth: 22 November 1969 (age 56)
- Place of birth: South Benfleet, England
- Position: Central defender

Youth career
- Colchester United

Senior career*
| Years | Team | Apps | (Gls) |
| 1988–1991 | Colchester United | 73 | (0) |
| 1991–1994 | Exeter City | 117 | (7) |
| 1994–1995 | Northampton Town | 8 | (0) |
| 1995–? | Dover Athletic | ? | (?) |
- Ramsgate
- Folkestone Invicta
- * Club domestic league appearances and goals as of 01:53, 12 May 2011

Scott Charles Daniels (born 22 November 1969, in South Benfleet) is a former professional footballer who played league football as a defender.

== Career ==
Daniels played for Football League clubs Colchester United, Exeter City, Northampton Town and non-league football for Dover Athletic, Ramsgate and Folkestone Invicta.

== Honours ==
=== Club ===
Colchester United

- Football Conference runner-up (1): 1990–91
