= Stuart Hicks =

English footballer

Personal information
- Full name: Stuart Jason Hicks
- Date of birth: 30 May 1967 (age 59)
- Place of birth: Peterborough, England
- Height: 6 ft 1 in (1.85 m)
- Position: Defender

Youth career
- Peterborough United

Senior career*
Years	Team	Apps	(Gls)
1984–1985	Peterborough United	0	(0)
1985–1988	Wisbech Town		
1988–1990	Colchester United	64	(7)
1990–1992	Scunthorpe United	67	(1)
1992–1993	Doncaster Rovers	36	(0)
1993–1994	Huddersfield Town	22	(1)
1994–1995	Preston North End	12	(0)
1995–1997	Scarborough	85	(2)
1997–2000	Leyton Orient	78	(1)
2000	Chester City	13	(0)
2000–2002	Mansfield Town	25	(0)
2002–2003	Hucknall Town		
Total		402	(12)
- * Club domestic league appearances and goals

Stuart Jason Hicks (born 30 May 1967) is an English former professional footballer who played as a defender.

== Playing career ==
Hicks began his career with hometown club Peterborough United, where he turned professional in August 1984. However he failed to make any league appearances for the Posh and he subsequently went on loan to non-league Wisbech Town. After returning he moved to Colchester United in March 1988 and remained there until they were relegated out of The Football League in 1990.

Hicks then had spells with Scunthorpe United, Doncaster Rovers, Huddersfield Town, Preston North End and Scarborough before returning south when he joined Leyton Orient in August 1997. After 78 league appearances for Orient, Hicks joined The Football League's bottom club Chester City in February 2000.

Despite making his debut in a club record 7–1 home defeat by Brighton & Hove Albion, Hicks struck up a tremendous rapport with the Chester fans as the club fought valiantly but unsuccessfully against relegation. Hicks' popularity with the supporters was such that he finished third in the player of the season awards after playing just 13 games for the club. However, he opted to remain in Division Three and joined Mansfield Town. Hicks was to have an injury hit spell at Field Mill and he announced his retirement from professional football in February 2002. He then joined non-league side Hucknall Town to complete his playing days.

Since retiring from the game, he has moved into men's designer clothing. He opened his first Mainline Menswear store in Scarborough, North Yorkshire, in 2002.

== Honours ==
=== Club ===
Scunthorpe United

- Football League Fourth Division Playoff Runner-up (1): 1991–92

Preston North End

- Football League Division Three Playoff Runner-up (1): 1993–94

Leyton Orient

- Football League Division Three Playoff Runner-up (1): 1998–99
