= Warren Ward (footballer) =

English association football player

Personal information
- Date of birth: 25 May 1962 (age 64)
- Place of birth: Plymstock, England
- Position: Forward

Youth career
- –: Yorkshire Amateur

Senior career*
Years	Team	Apps	(Gls)
–	Guiseley		
1984–1985	York City	4	(3)
1985–1986	Lincoln City	21	(8)
1985–1986	Exeter City	14	(3)
1986–1989	Boston United	89	(25)
1989–1990	King's Lynn	??	(16)
–	Spalding United		
–	Lincoln United		
1993–1995	Grantham Town	92	(25)
–	Boston Town		
199?–1998	Wisbech Town		

Managerial career
- 1994–1995: Grantham Town (player-manager)
- * Club domestic league appearances and goals

Warren R. Ward (born 25 May 1962) is an English former professional footballer who scored 14 goals from 39 games in the Football League playing as a forward for York City, Lincoln City and Exeter City.

== Career ==
Ward was born in Plymstock, Devon. He began his football career as a junior with Yorkshire Amateurs and played for Guiseley before making his debut in the Football League with York City. He also played in the League with Lincoln City, where he was joint top scorer alongside Neil Redfearn – with only 8 goals – in the 1985–86 season, which included a loan spell at Exeter City. He then moved into non-League football with Boston United, King's Lynn, Spalding United, Lincoln United, Grantham Town, where he was for a time player-manager, Boston Town and Wisbech Town. He went on to coach with the Lincolnshire Football Association.
