= Simon Lowe (footballer) =

English footballer (born 1962)

Personal information
- Full name: Simon John Lowe
- Date of birth: 26 December 1962 (age 63)
- Place of birth: Westminster, England
- Height: 5 ft 11 in (1.80 m)
- Position: Forward

Senior career*
Years	Team	Apps	(Gls)
	York City	0	(0)
?–1983	Ossett Town	?	(?)
1983–1984	Barnsley	2	(0)
1984–1986	Halifax Town	77	(19)
1986–1987	Hartlepool United	14	(1)
1986–1987	→ Colchester United (loan)	5	(1)
1987	Colchester United	31	(7)
1987–1988	Scarborough	16	(3)
1988–?	Goole Town	?	(?)
	Frickley Athletic	?	(?)
	Glasshoughton Welfare	?	(?)
	Pontefract Collieries	?	(?)
	Ossett Albion	?	(?)
- * Club domestic league appearances and goals

Simon John Lowe (born 26 December 1962) is an English former professional footballer who played as a forward in the Football League.

== Career ==
Born in Westminster, London Lowe made appearances for Football League clubs Barnsley, Halifax Town, Hartlepool United, Colchester United and Scarborough.

He now lives in Wakefield.
