= Kirk Game =

English footballer

Personal information
- Full name: Kirk Michael Game
- Date of birth: 22 October 1966 (age 60)
- Place of birth: Rochford, England
- Height: 6 ft 2 in (1.88 m)
- Position: Defender

Youth career
- 1977–1985: Southend United

Senior career*
Years	Team	Apps	(Gls)
1985–1987	Colchester United	29	(0)
- Dartford
1987–1988	Chelmsford City	9	(0)
- Heybridge Swifts
- Dagenham & Redbridge
1998–2000	Billericay Town		
- Braintree Town

International career
- England U16
- * Club domestic league appearances and goals

Kirk Michael Game (born 22 October 1966) is a former professional footballer who played as a defender and midfielder for Southend United, Colchester United and a number of semi-professional football clubs in England.

== Early life ==
Game was raised in Essex where he played in local junior leagues as a boy for Hadleigh Town, Blenheim Sports and Leigh Ramblers.

== Club career ==
=== Southend United ===
Game joined Southend United at the age of eleven and gradually worked his way through the playing ranks. He represented the under-18 youth team at fifteen whilst still at school and regularly trained with the first team squad during his school breaks. He signed as an apprentice at sixteen, became captain of the youth team and eventually the reserves.

He was offered a professional contract just after his seventeenth birthday by Bobby Moore, then manager of Southend. Game turned down a new contract he left the club for local rivals Colchester United.

=== Colchester United and later career ===
Former Everton and Norwich manager, Mike Walker, then manager of Colchester United, signed Game and it wasn't long before he made his return to his old club to secure a well earned draw. He made 29 appearances in the Football League for Colchester.

After several successful seasons Game took up a new challenge by moving to Europe where he played in Germany.

He returned to England a year later to play semi-professional for Dartford who were managed by Peter Taylor.

He remained at non-League level for the rest of his career playing for Chelmsford City, Heybridge Swifts, Dagenham & Redbridge, Billericay Town, Braintree Town.

== Coaching career ==
Game became football coach having achieved the UEFA 'A' licence and has been a coach/manager at the Youth Academy of West Ham United.

He also has many years experience as a secondary school P.E. Teacher, personal fitness trainer and has run many independent soccer schools and coaching clinics in England and the USA. He now manages the full-time U19 Academy at Heybridge Swifts with former West Ham United player Stuart Slater.
