= Nick Chatterton =

English footballer

Personal information
- Full name: Nicholas John Chatterton
- Date of birth: 18 May 1954 (age 72)
- Place of birth: South Norwood, Greater London
- Height: 5 ft 9 in (1.75 m)
- Position: Midfielder

Youth career
- ?–1973: Crystal Palace

Senior career*
Years	Team	Apps	(Gls)
1973–1979	Crystal Palace	151	(31)
1979–1986	Millwall	264	(56)
1986–1989	Colchester United	49	(8)
Total		464	(95)
- * Club domestic league appearances and goals

Nicholas John Chatterton (born 18 May 1954), is an English retired footballer who played as a midfielder in the Football League. Chatterton was born in South Norwood, London.

Chatterton started his career in 1973 at Crystal Palace, where he was the son of the club's groundskeeper Len Chatterton. In November 1978, he moved to neighbouring south London club, Millwall. In 1986, he moved to Colchester United, where he finished his career.
