= Stephen Grenfell (footballer) =

English footballer (born 1966)

Personal information
- Full name: Stephen John Grenfell
- Date of birth: 27 October 1966 (age 60)
- Place of birth: Enfield, London, England
- Height: 5 ft 9 in (1.75 m)
- Position: Full-back

Youth career
- Tottenham Hotspur

Senior career*
Years	Team	Apps	(Gls)
1985–1986	Tottenham Hotspur	0	(0)
1986	→ Colchester United (loan)	4	(1)
1986–1988	Colchester United	66	(0)
1988–1991	Bromley		
1991–1992	Dagenham		
1992–1994	Aylesbury United	48	(7)
Total		118	(8)
- * Club domestic league appearances and goals

Stephen John Grenfell (born 27 October 1966) is an English former footballer who played in the Football League as a fullback for Colchester United. He joined Colchester from the Tottenham Hotspur youth system, having failed to break into the Spurs first team. He worked as an academy coach for under-11s at Tottenham for ten years before moving to coach the first team and juniors at Maccabi London Lions. He also coached at the 2017 Maccabiah Games.

== Career ==
Born in Enfield, Grenfell began his career at Tottenham Hotspur, where he failed to break into the first-team squad. He was loaned to Colchester United for a month-long loan spell in October 1986, making his Football League debut on 31 October in a 3–0 home victory against Wolverhampton Wanderers. He played in four league matches for the club, scoring once during a 5–2 defeat to Scunthorpe United on 21 November. He also featured in two FA Cup ties during his loan spell, a 1–1 draw with Bishop's Stortford and the home replay win three days later, and also played in an Associate Members Cup qualifying group victory over Peterborough United.

Grenfell signed permanently for Colchester following his loan period, making his full-time debut on 28 November in a 3–1 win over Halifax Town. He made a further 66 appearances for the club to total 70 league games between 1986 and 1988, and scored one further goal for the U's on 6 December 1986 in a 3–2 FA Cup defeat to Aldershot. He played his last game for the club on 11 November 1988, a 2–2 home draw with Torquay United.

After leaving Colchester, Grenfell had spells with non-league clubs including Bromley, Dagenham and Aylesbury United, where he made 48 league appearances in two seasons with the Ducks, scoring seven goals.

After retiring from playing, Grenfell worked for his first club, Tottenham Hotspur, where he had roles as a 'Football in the Community' co-ordinater and a coach for the under-11 academy squad at the club. After ten years he moved to coach the first team and juniors at Maccabi London Lions. He also coached at the 2017 Maccabiah Games.
