= Simon Burman =

English footballer (born 1965)

Personal information
- Full name: Simon John Burman
- Date of birth: 26 November 1965 (age 60)
- Place of birth: Ipswich, England
- Height: 5 ft 10 in (1.78 m)
- Positions: Midfielder; winger

Youth career
- Colchester United

Senior career*
Years	Team	Apps	(Gls)
1984–1987	Colchester United	32	(3)
- Weymouth
Total		32	(3)
- * Club domestic league appearances and goals

Simon John Burman (born 26 November 1965) is an English former footballer who played as a midfielder or as a winger in the Football League for Colchester United.

== Career ==
Born in Ipswich, Burman began his career with Colchester United, signing on professional terms after coming through the club's youth system. He made his debut on 29 March 1985 in a 2–1 win against Tranmere Rovers, and scored his first goal for the club in a 2–2 away draw at Exeter City on 8 March 1986. He was never able to establish himself as a first-team regular, appearing 32 times in three seasons. His final game came in a 0–0 draw with Leyton Orient at Layer Road on 7 November 1986 before leaving to join Weymouth.
