= Rudi Hedman =

English footballer

Personal information
- Full name: Rudolph Gideon Hedman
- Date of birth: 16 November 1964 (age 61)
- Place of birth: Lambeth, Greater London, England
- Height: 6 ft 3 in (1.91 m)
- Position: Defender

Senior career*
Years	Team	Apps	(Gls)
1983–1988	Colchester United	176	(10)
1988–1992	Crystal Palace	21	(0)
1989–1990	→ Leyton Orient (loan)	5	(0)
1991	→ Colchester United (loan)	10	(0)
1992–1993	Dulwich Hamlet	?	(?)
1993–1995	Stevenage Borough	79	(2)
1995–1998	Sing Tao	49	(9)
Total		340	(21)
- * Club domestic league appearances and goals

Rudolph Gideon Hedman (born 16 November 1964) is an English retired professional footballer who played as a defender.

== Career ==
Born in Lambeth, Hedman signed as an apprentice for Colchester United in 1983, and he went on to make 219 appearances for the "U's" across two spells - the second a loan stint from Crystal Palace. His four-year stay with Palace was largely unsuccessful, although he made five appearances in the club's promotion season of 1988–89 and played in three out of the four play-off games which saw Palace reach the top flight. He moved on to play for Dulwich Hamlet in 1992 and later Stevenage Borough. He also played in Singapore and Hong Kong with Sing Tao before returning to England. After retiring from playing, Hedman joined the Colchester Centre of Excellence coaching staff.

== Personal life ==
His sister Deta Hedman is a professional darts player with several titles to her name.

== Honours ==
=== Club ===
Crystal Palace

- Football League Second Division playoff winner: 1988–89

Colchester United

- Football Conference runner-up: 1990–91

=== Individual ===
- Colchester United Player of the Year: 1987
