= Cyril Lea =

Welsh footballer

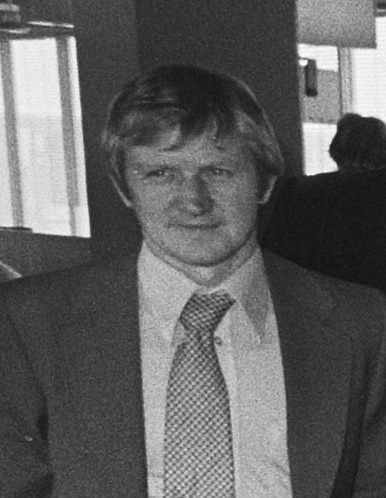

Personal information
- Date of birth: 5 August 1934 (age 92)
- Place of birth: Wrexham, Wales
- Height: 5 ft 9 in (1.75 m)
- Position: Right half

Senior career*
Years	Team	Apps	(Gls)
- Bradley Rangers
1957–1964	Leyton Orient	205	(0)
1964–1968	Ipswich Town	107	(2)

International career
1957	Wales Amateurs	3	(0)
1965	Wales	2	(0)

Managerial career
- 1968–1969: Ipswich Town (caretaker)
- 1983–1986: Colchester United
- * Club domestic league appearances and goals

Cyril Lea (born 5 August 1934) is a Welsh former footballer. He was born in Wrexham, and was capped on three occasions for the Wales Amateur team in 1957 and on two occasions by Wales.

He played for Leyton Orient and Ipswich Town, and was responsible for team selection at Portman Road for two months between the departure of Bill McGarry and the arrival of Bobby Robson.

Lea later became manager of Colchester United, and was in charge at Layer Road between February 1983 and April 1986.

== Managerial statistics ==
Team	Nat	From	To	Record				
Team	Nat	From	To	P	W	D	L	Win %
Ipswich Town (Caretaker)	(England)	24 November 1968	12 January 1969	7	3	0	4	42.9
Colchester United	(England)	18 January 1983	10 April 1986	173	71	46	56	41.0

== Honours ==
Ipswich Town

- Football League Second Division: 1967–68

Individual

- Ipswich Town Hall of Fame: Inducted 2010
