= Keith Day =

English footballer (born 1962)

Personal information
- Full name: Keith David Day
- Date of birth: 29 November 1962 (age 63)
- Place of birth: Grays, England
- Height: 6 ft 1 in (1.85 m)
- Position: Central defender

Senior career*
Years	Team	Apps	(Gls)
?–1984	Aveley	?	(?)
1984–1987	Colchester United	113	(12)
1987–1993	Leyton Orient	192	(9)
1993–1994	Sittingbourne	25	(0)
1997–1998	Romford	10	(1)
- Grays Athletic
- * Club domestic league appearances and goals

Keith David Day (born 29 November 1962) is a former professional footballer who played in the Football League as a defender.

== Career ==
Day made appearances for Colchester United and Leyton Orient in the Football League and non-league football for Aveley, Sittingbourne, Farnborough Town and Grays Athletic.

== Honours ==
Leyton Orient

- Football League Fourth Division play-offs: 1989

Individual

- PFA Team of the Year: 1987–88 Fourth Division
