= 1983–84 Colchester United F.C. season =

Colchester United
1983–84 season
- Chairman: Maurice Cadman
- Manager: Cyril Lea
- Stadium: Layer Road
- Fourth Division: 8th
- FA Cup: 3rd round (eliminated by Charlton Athletic)
- League Cup: 3rd round (eliminated by Manchester United)
- Associate Members' Cup: 2nd round (southern section) (eliminated by Southend United
- Top goalscorer: League: Tony Adcock (26); All: Tony Adcock (33)
- Highest home attendance: 13,031 v Manchester United, 9 November 1983
- Lowest home attendance: 1,226 v Torquay United, 28 April 1984
- Average home league attendance: 2,847
- Biggest win: 6–0 v Hartlepool United, 3 December 1983
- Biggest defeat: 1–5 v Aldershot, 23 April 1984
Home colours

The 1983–84 season was Colchester United's 42nd season in their history and third consecutive season in fourth tier of English football, the Fourth Division. Alongside competing in the Fourth Division, the club also participated in the FA Cup, the League Cup and the Associate Members' Cup.

Another promotion push ended a long way short with an eighth-placed finish, 15 points shy of the promotion places. Colchester reached the third round of the League Cup, where they faced Manchester United at Layer Road only to suffer a 2–0 defeat. They also reached the third round of the FA Cup, exiting to Charlton Athletic. In the inaugural Associate Members' Cup, the U's fell to a 2–0 defeat to Essex rivals Southend United in the second round.

== Season overview ==
Cyril Lea began his first full season in charge by bringing in assistant Stewart Houston in a player-coach capacity. He had however already seen the frustrating exit of last seasons top scorer Ian Allinson, who was allowed to leave the club for Arsenal on a free transfer following an administrative error.

In the early stages of the season, Colchester kept pace with the leaders as they embarked on a League Cup run. Following a 1–1 draw at Second Division Swansea City, chairman Maurice Cadman pledged Lea funds to purchase two players if there was an attendance greater than 5,000 in the second leg of the tie. As such, 5,204 were in attendance to see the U's beat the Swans 1–0. They were drawn at home to Manchester United in the third round as Layer Road saw its final-ever five figure gate when 13,031 saw the 2–0 defeat for the U's.

Colchester's form tailed off in the latter stages of the season as they ended the season 15 points adrift of the promotion places in eighth position, despite Tony Adcock's 33 goals. Now frustrated at his board's successive attempts to fund promotion that ultimately ended in failure, Maurice Cadman announced that win bonuses would be dropped for the 1984–85 season replaced by an insurance-backed promotion bonus. He also announced that the club had been put up for sale at a value of £150,000.

Attendances on average were up, largely in thanks to the cup runs, but otherwise league attendances dropped off, and a new low of 1,226 witnessed Colchester's 3–0 win over Torquay United on 28 April 1984. Meanwhile, stalwarts Micky Cook, who had set a club record of 614 league appearances, and Steve Leslie both retired through injury.

== Players ==
As of match played 11 May 1984.

Name	Position	Nationality	Place of birth	Date of birth	Apps	Goals	Signed from	Date signed	Fee
Goalkeepers
Alec Chamberlain	GK	(England)	March	20 June 1964 (aged 18)	4	0	(England) Ipswich Town	Summer 1982	Undisclosed
Defenders
Phil Coleman	FB	(England)	Woolwich	8 September 1960 (aged 22)	96	7	(England) Millwall	February 1981	£15,000
Tony Hadley	CB	(England)	Upminster	5 July 1955 (aged 27)	0	0	(England) Southend United	August 1983	Undisclosed
Rudi Hedman	CB	(England)	Lambeth	16 November 1964 (aged 18)	0	0	Apprentice	February 1984	Free transfer
Stewart Houston	CB	(Scotland)	Dunoon	20 August 1949 (aged 33)	0	0	(England) Sheffield United	Summer 1983	Undisclosed
Ian Phillips	FB	(Scotland)	Cumnock	23 April 1959 (aged 24)	0	0	(England) Northampton Town	September 1983	£5,000
Steve Wignall	CB	(England)	Liverpool	17 September 1954 (aged 28)	288	17	(England) Doncaster Rovers	September 1977	£5,000
Midfielders
Andy Farrell	MF/FB	(England)	Colchester	7 October 1965 (aged 17)	0	0	Apprentice	Summer 1982	Free transfer
Jeff Hull	MF	(England)	Rochford	25 August 1960 (aged 22)	27	4	(England) Basildon United	17 December 1982 (Note: Date of signing refers to the date of the player's first game for the club)	Undisclosed
Steve Leslie	MF	(England)	Hornsey	4 September 1952 (aged 30)	471	45	Apprentice	20 April 1971	Free transfer
Roger Osborne	MF	(England)	Otley	9 March 1950 (aged 33)	113	7	(England) Ipswich Town	February 1981	£25,000
Forwards
Tony Adcock	FW	(England)	Bethnal Green	27 March 1963 (aged 20)	83	23	Apprentice	31 March 1981	Free transfer
Keith Bowen	FW	(Wales)	(England) Northampton	26 February 1958 (aged 25)	13	4	(England) Brentford	25 March 1983 (Note: Date of signing refers to the date of the player's first game in his second spell for the club)	£10,000
Perry Groves	WG	(England)	Bow	19 April 1965 (aged 18)	31	3	(England) Cornard Dynamos	Summer 1981	Free transfer
Dave Hubbick	FW	(England)	South Shields	16 March 1960 (aged 23)	0	0	(England) Dagenham	15 October 1983	Free transfer
Les Mutrie	FW	(England)	Newcastle upon Tyne	1 April 1951 (aged 32)	0	0	(England) Hull City	January 1984	£10,000
Craig Oldfield	FW	(England)	Warley	24 November 1963 (aged 19)	0	0	(England) Stowmarket Town	Summer 1982	Free transfer
John Taylor	FW	(England)	Norwich	24 October 1964 (aged 18)	0	0	Apprentice	Summer 1981	Free transfer

== Transfers ==
=== In ===
Date	Position	Nationality	Name	From	Fee	Ref.
Summer 1983	CB	(Scotland)	Stewart Houston	(England) Sheffield United	Undisclosed	
August 1983	CB	(England)	Tony Hadley	(England) Southend United	Undisclosed	
September 1983	FB	(Scotland)	Ian Phillips	(England) Northampton Town	£5,000	
October 1983	CB	(England)	Adam Nichols	(England) Wits University	Free transfer	
15 October 1983	FW	(England)	Dave Hubbick	(England) Dagenham	Free transfer	(Note: Date of signing refers to the date of the player's first game for the club)
January 1984	FW	(England)	Les Mutrie	(England) Hull City	£10,000	
February 1984	CB	(England)	Rudi Hedman	Apprentice	Free transfer	

- Total spending: ▼ ~ £15,000

=== Out ===
Date	Position	Nationality	Name	To	Fee	Ref.
End of season	GK	(England)	Ian Cranstone	(England) Wealdstone	Free transfer	
End of season	GK		Bobby Hamilton	Free agent	Released	
End of season	CB	(England)	Adrian Keith	(England) Haverhill Rovers	Released	
End of season	FB	(England)	Wayne Ward	(England) Wivenhoe Town	Released	
End of season	MF		Andy Gooding	(England) Wivenhoe Town	Released	
Summer 1983	FW	(England)	Roy McDonough	(England) Southend United	Undisclosed	
2 January 1984	CB	(England)	Adam Nichols	Free agent	Released	(Note: Date of departure refers to the date of the player's final game for the club)
14 April 1984	FB	(England)	Micky Cook	Free agent	Retired	(Note: Stayed on with Colchester United as coach)

- Total incoming: ▲ ~ £0

=== Loans out ===
Date	Position	Nationality	Name	To	End date	Ref.
September 1983	FB	(England)	Phil Coleman	(Wales) Wrexham	March 1984	

== Match details ==
=== Fourth Division ===
==== Results round by round ====
Round	1	2	3	4	5	6	7	8	9	10	11	12	13	14	15	16	17	18	19	20	21	22	23	24	25	26	27	28	29	30	31	32	33	34	35	36	37	38	39	40	41	42	43	44	45	46
Ground	A	H	H	A	H	A	A	H	A	H	H	A	H	A	H	A	A	H	H	A	H	H	H	H	A	H	H	A	H	A	A	H	H	A	A	A	H	A	A	H	A	H	A	A	H	A
Result	W	W	D	D	W	D	L	W	L	D	W	L	W	D	W	D	L	W	W	L	W	D	W	D	W	W	D	D	D	D	L	W	L	L	L	D	L	D	D	D	L	W	L	W	W	L
Position	5	3	2	2	2	4	4	3	3	5	3	4	4	4	2	4	7	4	3	6	4	6	5	7	7	5	5	6	6	6	6	6	6	7	9	8	9	9	9	9	10	9	9	8	7	7

Source: 11v11.com
A = Away; H = Home; W = Win; D = Draw; L = Loss

Win Draw Loss

==== League table ====
Pos	Team	Pld	W	D	L	GF	GA	GD	Pts
6	Blackpool	46	21	9	16	70	52	+18	72
7	Peterborough United	46	18	14	14	72	48	+24	68
8	Colchester United	46	17	16	13	69	53	+16	67
9	Torquay United	46	18	13	15	59	64	−5	67
10	Tranmere Rovers	46	17	15	14	53	53	0	66

==== Matches ====
27 August 1983 1	Darlington	0–2	Colchester United	Darlington
		Report	Adcock 74'; Houston 86'	Stadium: Feethams; Attendance: 1,441; Referee: Roger Dilkes

3 September 1983 2	Colchester United	2–1	Blackpool	Colchester
15:00 BST	Adcock 14' (pen.); Serella 87' (o.g.)	Report	Serella 46'	Stadium: Layer Road; Attendance: 2,169; Referee: J Ashworth

6 September 1983 3	Colchester United	0–0	Bristol City	Colchester
19:30 BST		Report		Stadium: Layer Road; Attendance: 2,120; Referee: M James

9 September 1983 4	Stockport County	0–0	Colchester United	Stockport
		Report		Stadium: Edgeley Park; Attendance: 2,077; Referee: Vic Callow

17 September 1983 5	Colchester United	4–0	Rochdale	Colchester
15:00 BST	Bowen 30'; Adcock 38', 51'; Wignall 53'	Report		Stadium: Layer Road; Attendance: 1,955; Referee: Colin Downey

24 September 1983 6	Chesterfield	1–1	Colchester United	Chesterfield
	Birch 66'	Report	Wignall 73'	Stadium: Saltergate; Attendance: 4,106; Referee: D Scott

26 September 1983 7	Tranmere Rovers	2–1	Colchester United	Birkenhead
	Williams 18' (pen.); Ferguson 89'	Report	Adcock 60' (pen.)	Stadium: Prenton Park; Attendance: 1,866; Referee: M Heath

1 October 1983 8	Colchester United	1–0	Chester City	Colchester
15:00 BST	Adcock 55'	Report		Stadium: Layer Road; Attendance: 1,976; Referee: Martin Bodenham

7 October 1983 9	York City	3–0	Colchester United	York
	McPhail 41'; Pollard 72' (pen.); Walwyn 85'	Report		Stadium: Bootham Crescent; Attendance: 6,207; Referee: R Guy

15 October 1983 10	Colchester United	2–2	Northampton Town	Colchester
15:00 BST	Houston 16'; Cook 78'	Report	Austin 11'; O'Neill 81'	Stadium: Layer Road; Attendance: 1,964; Referee: D Letts

18 October 1983 11	Colchester United	1–0	Bury	Colchester
19:30 BST	Adcock 20'	Report		Stadium: Layer Road; Attendance: 1,969; Referee: Ian Borrett

22 October 1983 12	Swindon Town	2–1	Colchester United	Swindon
	Rowland 52'; Hockaday 77'	Report	Adcock 44' (pen.)	Stadium: County Ground; Attendance: 3,079; Referee: A Crickmore

29 October 1983 13	Colchester United	2–0	Crewe Alexandra	Colchester
15:00 GMT	Adcock 50', 89' (pen.)	Report		Stadium: Layer Road; Attendance: 3,402; Referee: M Taylor

1 November 1983 14	Doncaster Rovers	3–3	Colchester United	Doncaster
	Douglas 21'; Miller 50'; Snodin 87' (pen.); Humphries (red card)	Report	Bowen 6'; Humphries 13' (o.g.); Adcock 62' (pen.)	Stadium: Belle Vue; Attendance: 3,491; Referee: I Hendrick

5 November 1983 15	Colchester United	3–0	Reading	Colchester
	Houston 15'; Leslie 17'; Adcock 62'	Report	White (red card) 74'	Stadium: Layer Road; Attendance: 2,433; Referee: E Scales

12 November 1983 16	Mansfield Town	0–0	Colchester United	Mansfield
		Report		Stadium: Field Mill; Attendance: 3,042; Referee: J Hough

26 November 1983 17	Torquay United	2–1	Colchester United	Torquay
	Curle 38' (pen.), 45' (pen.)	Report	Cook 32'	Stadium: Plainmoor; Attendance: 1,364; Referee: J Deakin

3 December 1983 18	Colchester United	6–0	Hartlepool United	Colchester
15:00 GMT	Wignall 14', 82'; Nichols 58'; Phillips 69', 89'; Groves 79'	Report		Stadium: Layer Road; Attendance: 1,935; Referee: Alan Gunn

17 December 1983 19	Colchester United	4–1	Halifax Town	Colchester
	Houston 5'; Adcock 34'; Bowen 88'	Report	Greenaway 54'	Stadium: Layer Road; Attendance: 1,866; Referee: Alf Buksh

26 December 1983 20	Peterborough United	2–0	Colchester United	Peterborough
	Beech 75'; Waddle 89'	Report		Stadium: London Road Stadium; Attendance: 6,527; Referee: H Taylor

27 December 1983 21	Colchester United	4–1	Aldershot	Colchester
	Adcock 1' (pen.), 23'; Wignall 20'; Bowen 51'	Report	McDonald 22'	Stadium: Layer Road; Attendance: 3,123; Referee: J Bray

31 December 1983	Hereford United	A–A	Colchester United	Hereford
		Report		Stadium: Edgar Street
Note: Match abandoned after 68-minutes with the score at 1–0 to Hereford United due to a floodlight failure.

2 January 1984 22	Colchester United	1–1	Wrexham	Colchester
15:00 GMT	Adcock 43'	Report	Muldoon 60'	Stadium: Layer Road; Attendance: 3,182; Referee: D Hedges

14 January 1984 23	Colchester United	2–1	Darlington	Colchester
15:00 GMT	Adcock 63' (pen.), 65'	Report	Walsh 66'	Stadium: Layer Road; Attendance: 2,151; Referee: J Martin

28 January 1984 24	Colchester United	1–1	Stockport County	Colchester
15:00 GMT	Adcock 43'	Report	Sword 9'	Stadium: Layer Road; Attendance: 2,213; Referee: D Reeves

4 February 1984 25	Chester City	1–4	Colchester United	Chester
	Blackwell 82'	Report	Bowen 10', 66'; Phillips 32'; Mutrie 50'	Stadium: Sealand Road; Attendance: 1,179; Referee: J Key

11 February 1984 26	Colchester United	2–0	Chesterfield	Colchester
15:00 GMT	Adcock 28'; Wignall 29'	Report		Stadium: Layer Road; Attendance: 2,358; Referee: Rob Lewis

14 February 1984 27	Colchester United	1–1	Doncaster Rovers	Colchester
19:30 GMT	Bowen 21'	Report	Snodin 48'	Stadium: Layer Road; Attendance: 2,821; Referee: Tony Ward

18 February 1984 28	Crewe Alexandra	1–1	Colchester United	Crewe
	Crabbe 86' (pen.)	Report	Bowen 12'	Stadium: Gresty Road; Attendance: 2,532; Referee: M Scott

25 February 1984 29	Colchester United	0–0	Swindon Town	Colchester
15:00 GMT		Report		Stadium: Layer Road; Attendance: 2,448; Referee: Ian Borrett

4 March 1984 30	Bury	1–1	Colchester United	Bury
	Madden 72'	Report	Adcock 54' (pen.)	Stadium: Gigg Lane; Attendance: 1,576; Referee: David Hutchinson

7 March 1984 31	Reading	1–0	Colchester United	Reading
	Senior 67'	Report		Stadium: Elm Park; Attendance: 3,360; Referee: Martin Bodenham

10 March 1984 32	Colchester United	2–0	Mansfield Town	Colchester
15:00 GMT	Bowen 66'	Report		Stadium: Layer Road; Attendance: 2,007; Referee: M James

17 March 1984 33	Colchester United	1–3	York City	Colchester
15:00 GMT	Bowen 86'	Report	McPhail 30'; Walwyn 32'; Pearce 84'	Stadium: Layer Road; Attendance: 3,032; Referee: T Spencer

24 March 1984 34	Northampton Town	3–1	Colchester United	Northampton
	Austin 2'; Gage 59'; Belfon 64'	Report	Phillips 14'	Stadium: County Ground; Attendance: 1,499; Referee: N Ashley

31 March 1984 35	Bristol City	4–1	Colchester United	Bristol
	Ritchie 26', 65'; Riley 67', 81'	Report	Wignall 78'	Stadium: Ashton Gate Stadium; Attendance: 6,504; Referee: M Heath

4 April 1984 36	Hereford United	1–1	Colchester United	Hereford
	Phillips 50'	Report	Steve WignallWignall 35'	Stadium: Edgar Street; Attendance: 2,501; Referee: Joe Worrall

7 April 1984 37	Colchester United	0–1	Tranmere Rovers	Colchester
15:00 BST		Report	Palios 47'	Stadium: Layer Road; Attendance: 1,679; Referee: L Burden

14 April 1984 38	Hartlepool United	0–0	Colchester United	Hartlepool
		Report		Stadium: Victoria Park; Attendance: 1,001; Referee: A Robinson

17 April 1984 39	Rochdale	0–0	Colchester United	Rochdale
	Allatt (red card) 64'	Report		Stadium: Spotland Stadium; Attendance: 1,020; Referee: Peter Willis

21 April 1984 40	Colchester United	1–1	Peterborough United	Colchester
15:00 BST	Adcock 26'	Report	Holmes 88' (pen.)	Stadium: Layer Road; Attendance: 1,746; Referee: M Dimblebee

23 April 1984 41	Aldershot	5–1	Colchester United	Aldershot
	Burvill 8'; Banton 26', 66'; Lawrence 30'; Lucas 74'	Report	Adcock 44'	Stadium: Recreation Ground; Attendance: 2,443; Referee: Keren Barratt

28 April 1984 42	Colchester United	3–0	Torquay United	Colchester
15:00 BST	Compton 8' (o.g.); Phillips 28' (pen.); Adcock 46'	Report		Stadium: Layer Road; Attendance: 1,226; Referee: I Hunting

1 May 1984 43	Blackpool	3–2	Colchester United	Blackpool
	McNiven 10'; Stonehouse 42', 86'	Report	Hull 12'; Adcock 26'	Stadium: Bloomfield Road; Attendance: 3,111; Referee: C Seel

5 May 1984 44	Wrexham	0–2	Colchester United	Wrexham
		Report	Osborne 55'; Groves 58'	Stadium: Racecourse Ground; Attendance: 1,016; Referee: T Fitzharris

7 May 1984 45	Colchester United	3–0	Hereford United	Colchester
15:00 BST	Bowen 19'; Adcock 55'; Larkin 72' (o.g.)	Report		Stadium: Layer Road; Attendance: 1,286; Referee: D Letts

11 May 1984 46	Halifax Town	4–1	Colchester United	Halifax
	Ward 10'; Gallagher 44', 47'; Mell 87'	Report	Mutrie 90'	Stadium: The Shay; Attendance: 1,248; Referee: D Owen

=== League Cup ===
30 August 1983 1st round 1st leg	Colchester United	3–2	Reading	Colchester
19:30 BST	Adcock 27', 50'; Wignall 36'	Report	Barnes 41'; Senior 83'	Stadium: Layer Road; Attendance: 2,418; Referee: M Scott

14 September 1983 1st round 2nd leg	Reading	4–3 (a.e.t.)	Colchester United	Reading
	Beavon 15'; Senior 47', 48', 103'	Report	Adcock 22'; Wignall 30'; Bowen 119'	Stadium: Elm Park; Attendance: 3,460; Referee: Tony Ward
Note: Match drawn at 6–6. Colchester won on the away goals rule.

4 October 1983 2nd round 1st leg	Swansea City	1–1	Colchester United	Swansea
	Gale 45'	Report	Adcock 15'	Stadium: Vetch Field; Attendance: 3,758; Referee: A Saville

25 October 1983 2nd round 2nd leg	Colchester United	1–0	Swansea City	Colchester
19:30 GMT	Adcock 40'	Report		Stadium: Layer Road; Attendance: 5,204; Referee: K Salmon
Note: Colchester won 2–1 on aggregate

8 November 1983 3rd round	Colchester United	0–2	Manchester United	Colchester
19:30 GMT		Report	McQueen 8'; Moses 24'	Stadium: Layer Road; Attendance: 13,031; Referee: Tom Bune

=== FA Cup ===
19 November 1983 1st round	Torquay United	1–2	Colchester United	Torquay
	Curle 55'	Report	Bowen 17', 78'; Hadley (yellow card) 85' (red card)	Stadium: Plainmoor; Attendance: 2,126; Referee: Keith Cooper

10 December 1983 2nd round	Colchester United	4–0	Wealdstone	Colchester
15:00 GMT	Bowen 4', 23', 43'; Houston 12'	Report		Stadium: Layer Road; Attendance: 2,673; Referee: Martin Bodenham

12 January 1984 3rd round	Colchester United	0–1	Charlton Athletic	Colchester
		Report	Phillips 79' (o.g.)	Stadium: Layer Road; Attendance: 6,296; Referee: T Spencer

=== Associate Members' Cup ===
21 February 1984 1st round (southern section)	Colchester United	2–1	Wimbledon	Colchester
19:30 GMT	Adcock 20' (pen.), 40' (pen.)	Report	Fishenden 26'; Peters (red card) 30'	Stadium: Layer Road; Attendance: 1,888; Referee: M Taylor

13 March 1984 2nd round (southern section)	Colchester United	0–2	Southend United	Colchester
19:30 GMT		Report	Whymark 66'; Kellock 88'	Stadium: Layer Road; Attendance: 2,841; Referee: Keith Hackett

== Squad statistics ==
=== Appearances and goals ===
No.	Pos	Nat	Player	Total		Fourth Division		FA Cup		League Cup		Football League Trophy	
No.	Pos	Nat	Player	Apps	Goals	Apps	Goals	Apps	Goals	Apps	Goals	Apps	Goals
	GK	(England) ENG	Alec Chamberlain	56	0	46	0	3	0	5	0	2	0
	DF	(England) ENG	Phil Coleman	9	0	7+1	0	0	0	0	0	1	0
	DF	(England) ENG	Tony Hadley	55	0	44+1	0	3	0	5	0	2	0
	DF	(England) ENG	Rudi Hedman	4	0	3+1	0	0	0	0	0	0	0
	DF	(Scotland) SCO	Stewart Houston	51	5	42	4	3	1	5	0	1	0
	DF	(Scotland) SCO	Ian Phillips	48	5	43	5	3	0	0	0	2	0
	DF	(England) ENG	Steve Wignall	45	10	36	8	3	0	4	2	2	0
	MF	(England) ENG	Andy Farrell	21	0	15	0	1	0	5	0	0	0
	MF	(England) ENG	Jeff Hull	39	1	33	1	0	0	4	0	2	0
	MF	(England) ENG	Steve Leslie	32	1	25	1	3	0	2	0	1+1	0
	MF	(England) ENG	Roger Osborne	44	1	34+2	1	3	0	4	0	1	0
	FW	(England) ENG	Tony Adcock	53	33	41+2	26	3	0	5	5	2	2
	FW	(Wales) WAL	Keith Bowen	55	18	46	12	3	5	4	1	2	0
	FW	(England) ENG	Perry Groves	50	2	38+4	2	2	0	4+1	0	1	0
	FW	(England) ENG	Dave Hubbick	14	0	3+7	0	1+1	0	2	0	0	0
	FW	(England) ENG	Les Mutrie	16	2	10+4	2	0	0	0	0	1+1	0
	FW	(England) ENG	Craig Oldfield	4	0	0+3	0	0	0	0	0	0+1	0
	FW	(England) ENG	John Taylor	1	0	0	0	0	0	0+1	0	0	0
Players who appeared for Colchester who left during the season
	DF	(England) ENG	Micky Cook	45	2	36	2	2	0	5	0	2	0
	DF	(England) ENG	Adam Nichols	7	1	4+2	1	0	0	1	0	0	0

=== Goalscorers ===
Place	Nationality	Position	Name	Fourth Division	FA Cup	League Cup	Football League Trophy	Total
1	(England)	FW	Tony Adcock	26	0	5	2	33
2	(Wales)	FW	Keith Bowen	12	5	1	0	18
3	(England)	CB	Steve Wignall	8	0	2	0	10
4	(Scotland)	CB	Stewart Houston	4	1	0	0	5
4	(Scotland)	FB	Ian Phillips	5	0	0	0	5
6	(England)	FB	Micky Cook	2	0	0	0	2
6	(England)	WG	Perry Groves	2	0	0	0	2
6	(England)	FW	Les Mutrie	2	0	0	0	2
9	(England)	MF	Jeff Hull	1	0	0	0	1
9	(England)	MF	Steve Leslie	1	0	0	0	1
9	(England)	CB	Adam Nichols	1	0	0	0	1
9	(England)	MF	Roger Osborne	1	0	0	0	1
			Own goals	4	0	0	0	4
			TOTALS	69	6	8	2	85

=== Disciplinary record ===
Nationality	Position	Name	Fourth Division		FA Cup		League Cup		Football League Trophy		Total	
Nationality	Position	Name	Yellow card	Red card	Yellow card	Red card	Yellow card	Red card	Yellow card	Red card	Yellow card	Red card
(England)	CB	Tony Hadley	0	0	1	1	0	0	0	0	1	1
(England)	FB	Micky Cook	2	0	0	0	0	0	0	0	2	0
		TOTALS	2	0	1	1	0	0	0	0	3	1

=== Clean sheets ===
Number of games goalkeepers kept a clean sheet.

Place	Nationality	Player	Fourth Division	FA Cup	League Cup	Football League Trophy	Total
1	(England)	Alec Chamberlain	18	1	1	0	20
		TOTALS	18	1	1	0	20

=== Player debuts ===
Players making their first-team Colchester United debut in a fully competitive match.

Position	Nationality	Player	Date	Opponent	Ground	Notes
CB	(England)	Tony Hadley	27 August 1983	Darlington	Feethams	
CB	(Scotland)	Stewart Houston	27 August 1983	Darlington	Feethams	
MF	(England)	Andy Farrell	27 August 1983	Darlington	Feethams	
FW	(England)	Craig Oldfield	3 September 1983	Blackpool	Layer Road	
FB	(Scotland)	Ian Phillips	9 September 1983	Stockport County	Edgeley Park	
FW	(England)	John Taylor	14 September 1983	Reading	Elm Park	
FW	(England)	Dave Hubbick	15 October 1983	Northampton Town	Layer Road	
CB	(England)	Adam Nichols	18 October 1983	Bury	Layer Road	
FW	(England)	Les Mutrie	28 January 1984	Stockport County	Layer Road	
CB	(England)	Rudi Hedman	4 March 1984	Bury	Gigg Lane	

== See also ==
- List of Colchester United F.C. seasons
