= 1984–85 Colchester United F.C. season =

Colchester United
1984–85 season
- Chairman: Maurice Cadman
- Manager: Cyril Lea
- Stadium: Layer Road
- Fourth Division: 7th
- FA Cup: 2nd round (eliminated by Gillingham)
- League Cup: 1st round (eliminated by Gillingham)
- Associate Members' Cup: 2nd round (southern section) (eliminated by Walsall
- Top goalscorer: League: Tony Adcock (24); All: Tony Adcock (28)
- Highest home attendance: 4,487 v Gillingham, 8 December 1984
- Lowest home attendance: 1,641 v Aldershot, 22 September 1984
- Average home league attendance: 2,225
- Biggest win: 5–1 v Exeter City, 23 March 1985
- Biggest defeat: 0–5 v Gillingham, 8 December 1984
Home colours

The 1984–85 season was Colchester United's 43rd season in their history and fourth consecutive season in fourth tier of English football, the Fourth Division. Alongside competing in the Fourth Division, the club also participated in the FA Cup, the League Cup and the Associate Members' Cup.

Once again, Colchester finished high in the Fourth Division table, but ten points off promotion. Remarkably, the U's were paired against Gillingham in all three cup competitions they participated in, but only succeeded in beating them once, failing to defeat them in the first round of the League Cup and second round of the FA Cup, but won over two legs in the Associate Members' Cup.

== Season overview ==
Despite chairman Maurice Cadman announcing the removal of win bonuses for the season, only three of the eight out-of-contract players chose to move on despite the new scheme. Steve Wignall however decided to leave for Brentford.

Colchester were paired with Gillingham in the first round of the League Cup, where they were beaten 5–2 over two legs. The U's were then drawn against them in the second round of the FA Cup after seeing off Southend United in the Essex derby following a replay. Again, Gillingham won, on this occasion scoring five in a single match and inflicting the heaviest ever home defeat on Colchester.

In-form forward Tony Adcock continued his scoring form, with 28 goals to his name by January. However, with Liverpool rumoured to be interested in signing him and Bobby Hunt's 38-goal record in sight, he suffered a serious knee injury which ruled him out for almost the remainder of the season.

Once more Colchester fell just short of promotion in seventh place, but ten points adrift of automatic promotion in fourth position. The club equalled its record away win with a 5–1 victory at Exeter City on 23 March.

Meanwhile, Maurice Cadman found a new buyer for the club, with Jonathan Crisp paying the £150,000 asking price. He promised Second Division football within five years, but in light of the Bradford City stadium fire on 11 May, a move away from the timber-constructed Layer Road stands meant fabricating a move away or redevelopment of the stadium was of utmost importance.

== Players ==
As of match played 10 May 1985.

Name	Position	Nationality	Place of birth	Date of birth	Apps	Goals	Signed from	Date signed	Fee
Goalkeepers
Alec Chamberlain	GK	(England)	March	20 June 1964 (aged 19)	60	0	(England) Ipswich Town	Summer 1982	Undisclosed
Defenders
Keith Day	CB	(England)	Grays	29 November 1962 (aged 21)	0	0	(England) Aveley	Summer 1984	Undisclosed
Tony English	DF/MF	(England)	Luton	19 October 1966 (aged 17)	0	0	(England) Coventry City	24 December 1984	Free transfer
Rudi Hedman	CB	(England)	Lambeth	16 November 1964 (aged 19)	4	0	Apprentice	February 1984	Free transfer
Stewart Houston	CB	(Scotland)	Dunoon	20 August 1949 (aged 34)	51	5	(England) Sheffield United	Summer 1983	Undisclosed
Ian Phillips	FB	(Scotland)	Cumnock	23 April 1959 (aged 25)	48	5	(England) Northampton Town	September 1983	£5,000
Midfielders
Andy Farrell	MF/FB	(England)	Colchester	7 October 1965 (aged 18)	21	0	Apprentice	Summer 1982	Free transfer
Jeff Hull	MF	(England)	Rochford	25 August 1960 (aged 23)	66	5	(England) Basildon United	17 December 1982 (Note: Date of signing refers to the date of the player's first game for the club)	Undisclosed
Roger Osborne	MF	(England)	Otley	9 March 1950 (aged 34)	157	8	(England) Ipswich Town	February 1981	£25,000
Noel Parkinson	MF	(England)	Kingston upon Hull	16 November 1959 (aged 24)	0	0	(England) Scunthorpe United	August 1984	Undisclosed
Forwards
Tony Adcock	FW	(England)	Bethnal Green	27 March 1963 (aged 21)	136	56	Apprentice	31 March 1981	Free transfer
Keith Bowen	FW	(Wales)	(England) Northampton	26 February 1958 (aged 26)	68	22	(England) Brentford	25 March 1983 (Note: Date of signing refers to the date of the player's first game in his second spell for the club)	£10,000
Simon Burman	WG/MF	(England)	Ipswich	26 November 1965 (aged 18)	0	0	Apprentice	15 February 1985	Free transfer
Perry Groves	WG	(England)	Bow	19 April 1965 (aged 19)	81	5	(England) Cornard Dynamos	Summer 1981	Free transfer
Liburd Henry	FW	(Dominica)	Roseau	29 August 1964 (aged 19)	0	0	Unknown	Summer 1984	Free transfer
Russell Irving	FW	(England)	Wallsend	4 January 1964 (aged 20)	0	0	(England) Ipswich Town	Summer 1984	Undisclosed

== Transfers ==
=== In ===
Date	Position	Nationality	Name	From	Fee	Ref.
Summer 1984	CB	(England)	Keith Day	(England) Aveley	Undisclosed	
Summer 1984	FW	(Dominica)	Liburd Henry	Unknown	Free transfer	
Summer 1984	FW	(England)	Russell Irving	(England) Ipswich Town	Undisclosed	
August 1984	FB	(England)	Daryl Godbold	(England) Norwich City	Undisclosed	
August 1984	MF	(England)	Noel Parkinson	(England) Scunthorpe United	Undisclosed	
August 1984	MF	(England)	Stuart Youngman	Apprentice	Free transfer	
24 December 1984	DF/MF	(England)	Tony English	(England) Coventry City	Free transfer	
5 February 1985	FW	(England)	Tommy English	(England) Plymouth Argyle	Undisclosed	(Note: Date of signing refers to the date of the player's first game for the club)
15 February 1985	WG/MF	(England)	Simon Burman	Apprentice	Free transfer	

- Total spending: ▼ ~ £0

=== Out ===
Date	Position	Nationality	Name	To	Fee	Ref.
End of season	FB	(England)	Phil Coleman	(England) Chelmsford City	Released	
End of season	MF	(England)	Steve Leslie	(England) Chelmsford City	Released	
End of season	FW	(England)	Craig Oldfield	(England) Bury Town	Released	
Summer 1984	CB	(England)	Tony Hadley	(England) Southend United	Free transfer	
Summer 1984	FW	(England)	Les Mutrie	(England) Hartlepool United	Released	
August 1984	CB	(England)	Steve Wignall	(England) Brentford	Undisclosed	
December 1984	FW	(England)	John Taylor	(England) Sudbury Town	Released	
21 December 1984	FB	(England)	Daryl Godbold	(England) Wroxham	Undisclosed	(Note: Date of departure refers to the date of the player's final game for the club)
5 February 1985	FW	(England)	Tommy English	(Australia) Canberra City	Undisclosed	
23 April 1985	MF	(England)	Stuart Youngman	(England) Wroxham	Undisclosed	
23 April 1985	FW	(England)	Dave Hubbick	(England) Gravesend & Northfleet	Released	

- Total incoming: ▲ ~ £0

=== Loans in ===
Date	Position	Nationality	Name	From	End date	Ref.
March 1985	FW	(England)	Paul Shinners	(England) Gillingham	10 May 1985	(Note: Loan end date refers to the date of the player's final game for the club)

== Match details ==
=== Fourth Division ===
==== Results round by round ====
Round	1	2	3	4	5	6	7	8	9	10	11	12	13	14	15	16	17	18	19	20	21	22	23	24	25	26	27	28	29	30	31	32	33	34	35	36	37	38	39	40	41	42	43	44	45	46
Ground	H	A	H	A	A	H	A	H	A	H	A	H	H	A	A	H	A	H	A	A	H	H	A	H	A	H	H	H	A	A	H	H	A	A	H	H	A	H	A	A	H	A	A	H	A	H
Result	D	D	D	L	W	W	W	W	L	L	W	W	L	D	L	W	D	W	L	W	D	W	D	W	W	W	W	W	D	L	D	L	W	D	W	D	L	W	L	D	D	L	W	D	L	W
Position	10	10	15	18	14	8	7	4	7	8	7	6	6	10	11	9	10	8	9	8	9	7	7	7	7	5	6	3	3	5	6	6	6	6	6	6	6	6	6	6	6	6	6	6	8	5

Source: 11v11.com
A = Away; H = Home; W = Win; D = Draw; L = Loss

==== League table ====
Pos	Team	Pld	W	D	L	GF	GA	GD	Pts
5	Hereford United	46	22	11	13	65	47	+18	77
6	Tranmere Rovers	46	24	3	19	83	66	+17	75
7	Colchester United	46	20	14	12	87	65	+22	74
8	Swindon Town	46	21	9	16	62	58	+4	72
9	Scunthorpe United	46	19	14	13	83	62	+21	71

==== Matches ====
25 August 1984 1	Colchester United	3–3	Southend United	Colchester
15:00 BST	Adcock 9', 32', 44'	Report	Whymark 21'; Phillips 22'; Ferguson 80'	Stadium: Layer Road; Attendance: 2,378; Referee: Brian Hill

31 August 1984 2	Scunthorpe United	2–2	Colchester United	Scunthorpe
	Cammack 31'; Cowling 90'	Report	Bowen 4'; Adcock 77'	Stadium: Old Showground; Attendance: 1,818; Referee: T Curtis

8 September 1984 3	Colchester United	1–1	Blackpool	Colchester
15:00 BST	Adcock 83'	Report	Deary 35' (pen.)	Stadium: Layer Road; Attendance: 1,772; Referee: M Cotton

15 September 1984 4	Bury	4–3	Colchester United	Bury
	Entwistle 15'; Madden 71', 87'; White 74'	Report	Adcock 79'; Houston 84'; Hull 90'	Stadium: Gigg Lane; Attendance: 2,145; Referee: P Vanes

19 September 1984 5	Mansfield Town	0–1	Colchester United	Mansfield
		Report	Bowen 34'	Stadium: Field Mill; Attendance: 2,084; Referee: L Robinson

22 September 1984 6	Colchester United	2–0	Aldershot	Colchester
15:00 BST	Adcock 4', 39'	Report		Stadium: Layer Road; Attendance: 1,641; Referee: Ian Borrett

29 September 1984 7	Northampton Town	1–3	Colchester United	Northampton
	Hayes 24'; Mundee (red card) 64'	Report	Parkinson 70'; Adcock 74'; Bowen 78'	Stadium: County Ground; Attendance: 1,595; Referee: J Martin

2 October 1984 8	Colchester United	2–1	Torquay United	Colchester
	Bowen 81'; Hull 83'	Report	Barnes 64'	Stadium: Layer Road; Attendance: 1,813; Referee: Tony Ward

13 October 1984 9	Darlington	4–0	Colchester United	Darlington
	Forster 11', 75'; McLean 61' (pen.); Airey 72'	Report	Groves (red card) 38'	Stadium: Feethams; Attendance: 2,021; Referee: J McAulay

16 October 1984 10	Colchester United	3–4	Exeter City	Colchester
	Adcock 6'; Hull 35'; Groves 52'	Report	Sims 4'; Smith 51'; Harrower 54'; Pratt 55'	Stadium: Layer Road; Attendance: 1,846; Referee: Martin Bodenham

20 October 1984 11	Chester City	1–2	Colchester United	Chester
	Fox 60'	Report	Adcock 23', 45'	Stadium: Sealand Road; Attendance: 1,400; Referee: Roger Dilkes

23 October 1984 12	Colchester United	3–0	Stockport County	Colchester
19:30 BST	Hull 27', 87'; Groves 55'	Report		Stadium: Layer Road; Attendance: 2,153; Referee: Colin Downey

26 October 1984 13	Colchester United	1–3	Halifax Town	Colchester
19:30 BST	Adcock 9'	Report	Lowe 16'; Ayre 57'; Gallagher 86'	Stadium: Layer Road; Attendance: 2,295; Referee: Tom Bune

3 November 1984 14	Chesterfield	1–1	Colchester United	Chesterfield
	Moss 75'	Report	Adcock 45'	Stadium: Saltergate; Attendance: 3,614; Referee: George Courtney

6 November 1984 15	Tranmere Rovers	3–1	Colchester United	Birkenhead
	Clayton 34', 54'; Clarke 36' (pen.)	Report	Godbold 90'	Stadium: Prenton Park; Attendance: 1,587; Referee: T Mills

9 November 1984 16	Colchester United	1–0	Hartlepool United	Colchester
19:30 GMT	Adcock 78'	Report		Stadium: Layer Road; Attendance: 2,136; Referee: Alf Buksh

24 November 1984 17	Rochdale	1–1	Colchester United	Rochdale
	Cooke 90'	Report	Groves 84'	Stadium: Spotland Stadium; Attendance: 1,012; Referee: R Bridges

1 December 1984 18	Colchester United	3–1	Peterborough United	Colchester
	Irving 22'; Groves 24'; Adcock 38'	Report; Report	Kelly 41'	Stadium: Layer Road; Attendance: 2,070; Referee: M James

15 December 1984 19	Swindon Town	2–1	Colchester United	Swindon
	Coyne 18'; Gordon 41'	Report	Adcock 33'	Stadium: County Ground; Attendance: 2,263; Referee: Keith Cooper

21 December 1984 20	Crewe Alexandra	1–4	Colchester United	Crewe
	Allatt 16'	Report	Adcock 31'; Groves 33'; Bowen 59', 90'	Stadium: Gresty Road; Attendance: 1,529; Referee: J Bray

26 December 1984 21	Colchester United	2–2	Hereford United	Colchester
15:00 GMT	Adcock 79'; Bowen 80'	Report	S Phillips 31'; I Phillips 89' (o.g.)	Stadium: Layer Road; Attendance: 2,525; Referee: D Reeves

28 December 1984 22	Colchester United	3–2	Port Vale	Colchester
19:30 GMT	Groves 4'; Bowen 32' (pen.), 56' (pen.)	Report	Brown 50'; Smith 66'	Stadium: Layer Road; Attendance: 2,014; Referee: E Scales

1 January 1985 23	Wrexham	2–2	Colchester United	Wrexham
	Edwards 61'; Horne 85'	Report	Phillips 21'; Irving 75'	Stadium: Racecourse Ground; Attendance: 1,376; Referee: R Banks

26 January 1985 24	Colchester United	1–0	Bury	Colchester
15:00 GMT	Osborne 46'	Report		Stadium: Layer Road; Attendance: 2,028; Referee: Rob Lewis

29 January 1985 25	Southend United	2–5	Colchester United	Southend-on-Sea
	Hadley 64'; Pennyfather 80'	Report	Adcock 8'; Groves 11', 23'; Bowen 62', 73'	Stadium: Roots Hall; Attendance: 2,401

1 February 1985 26	Colchester United	4–1	Northampton Town	Colchester
19:30 GMT	Hedman 63'; Adcock 70'; Day 72'; Parkinson 83' (pen.)	Report	Mundee 85'	Stadium: Layer Road; Attendance: 2,314; Referee: Tony Ward

22 February 1985 27	Colchester United	3–1	Chesterfield	Colchester
	Adcock 33', 60', 77'	Report	Newton 56'	Stadium: Layer Road; Attendance: 2,303; Referee: N Butler

26 February 1985 28	Colchester United	2–1	Mansfield Town	Colchester
	Day 4'; Groves 82'	Report	Vinter 38'; Kearney (yellow card) 84' (red card)	Stadium: Layer Road; Attendance: 2,267; Referee: D Letts

1 March 1985 29	Halifax Town	0–0	Colchester United	Halifax
		Report		Stadium: The Shay; Attendance: 1,022; Referee: M Peek

4 March 1985 30	Stockport County	1–0	Colchester United	Stockport
	Evans 88'	Report		Stadium: Edgeley Park; Attendance: 1,561; Referee: A Seville

8 March 1985 31	Colchester United	1–1	Chester City	Colchester
19:30 GMT	Irving 75'	Report	Rimmer 31'	Stadium: Layer Road; Attendance: 2,224; Referee: K Baker

15 March 1985 32	Colchester United	1–2	Darlington	Colchester
19:30 GMT	Irving 40'	Report	McLean 22'; Airey 38'	Stadium: Layer Road; Attendance: 1,739; Referee: Alan Gunn

23 March 1985 33	Exeter City	1–5	Colchester United	Exeter
	Morgan 49'	Report	Bowen 32', 55'; Parkinson 61'; Irving 83', 87'	Stadium: St James Park; Attendance: 1,828; Referee: Roger Milford

26 March 1985 34	Blackpool	1–1	Colchester United	Blackpool
	Pashley 68'	Report	Tony English 7'	Stadium: Bloomfield Road; Attendance: 4,057; Referee: D Shaw

29 March 1985 35	Colchester United	2–1	Tranmere Rovers	Colchester
19:30 GMT	Day 80'; Tony English 84'	Report	Clarke 22'; Sinclair (red card) 65'	Stadium: Layer Road; Attendance: 2,044; Referee: D Hedges

2 April 1985 36	Colchester United	1–1	Scunthorpe United	Colchester
19:30 BST	Day 49'	Report	Broddle 51'; Graham (yellow card) 30' (red card); Lees (yellow card) 87' (red card)	Stadium: Layer Road; Attendance: 2,409; Referee: M James

6 April 1985 37	Hereford United	2–1	Colchester United	Hereford
	Phillips 11'; Price 25'	Report	Bowen 75' (pen.)	Stadium: Edgar Street; Attendance: 3,485; Referee: P Tyldesley

8 April 1985 38	Colchester United	4–1	Wrexham	Colchester
15:00 BST	Bowen 17'; Irving 32', 80'; Hubbick 90'	Report	Edwards 25'	Stadium: Layer Road; Attendance: 2,204; Referee: Ian Borrett

13 April 1985 39	Hartlepool United	2–1	Colchester United	Hartlepool
	Dobson 32', 77'	Report	Parkinson 76'	Stadium: Victoria Park; Attendance: 1,512; Referee: N Glover

16 April 1985 40	Torquay United	1–1	Colchester United	Torquay
	Walsh 54'	Report	Bowen 34'	Stadium: Plainmoor; Attendance: 1,191

19 April 1985 41	Colchester United	1–1	Rochdale	Colchester
19:30 BST	Parkinson 15'	Report	Diamond 13' (pen.)	Stadium: Layer Road; Attendance: 1,853; Referee: J Ball

23 April 1985 42	Aldershot	1–0	Colchester United	Aldershot
	McDonald 76'	Report		Stadium: Recreation Ground; Attendance: 1,624; Referee: D Brazier

27 April 1985 43	Peterborough United	0–1	Colchester United	Peterborough
		Report	Hedman 30'	Stadium: London Road Stadium; Attendance: 1,624; Referee: L Robinson

4 May 1985 44	Colchester United	1–1	Swindon Town	Colchester
	Tony English 77'	Report	Ramsey 43'	Stadium: Layer Road; Attendance: 1,867; Referee: G Napthine

6 May 1985 45	Port Vale	3–2	Colchester United	Burslem
	Brown 40'; Kellock 65'; Earle 71' (pen.)	Report	Shinners 85'; Groves 89'	Stadium: Vale Park; Attendance: 2,526; Referee: G Aplin

10 May 1985 46	Colchester United	4–1	Crewe Alexandra	Colchester
19:30 BST	Osborne 35'; Bowen 66'; Parkinson 70'; Irving 89'	Report	Allatt 20'	Stadium: Layer Road; Attendance: 1,864; Referee: Brian Hill

=== League Cup ===
28 August 1984 1st round 1st leg	Gillingham	3–2	Colchester United	Gillingham
	Weatherly 31'; Mehmet 49'; Leslie 90'	Report	Bowen 54'; Houston 87'	Stadium: Priestfield Stadium; Attendance: 2,689; Referee: Rob Lewis

4 September 1984 1st round 2nd leg	Colchester United	0–2	Gillingham	Colchester
19:30 BST		Report	Weatherly 68', 86'	Stadium: Layer Road; Attendance: 2,162; Referee: Keith Hackett
Note: Gillingham won 5–2 on aggregate.

=== FA Cup ===
17 November 1984 1st round	Southend United	2–2	Colchester United	Southend-on-Sea
	Clark 14'; Phillips 51' (pen.)	Report	Irving 3'; Houston 21'	Stadium: Roots Hall; Attendance: 2,935; Referee: E Scales

21 November 1984 1st round replay	Colchester United	3–2 (a.e.t.)	Colchester United	Colchester
19:30 GMT	Adcock 29'; Pennyfather 74' (o.g.); Groves 104'	Report	Shepherd 13'; Phillips 31'	Stadium: Layer Road; Attendance: 3,907; Referee: E Scales

8 December 1984 2nd round	Colchester United	0–5	Gillingham	Colchester
		Report	Robinson 30'; Shearer 31', 61', 90'; Cascarino 86'	Stadium: Layer Road; Attendance: 4,487; Referee: Colin Downey

=== Associate Members' Cup ===
23 January 1985 1st round 1st leg (southern section)	Gillingham	2–2	Colchester United	Gillingham
	Oakes 62'; Shinners 89'	Report	Groves 22'; Adcock 29'	Stadium: Priestfield Stadium

5 February 1985 1st round 2nd leg (southern section)	Colchester United	2–0	Gillingham	Colchester
19:30 GMT	Adcock 34', 43'	Report		Stadium: Layer Road; Attendance: 1,762; Referee: Colin Downey
Note: Colchester won 4–2 on aggregate.

12 March 1985 2nd round (southern section)	Walsall	1–0	Colchester United	Walsall
	Childs 15'	Report		Stadium: Fellows Park; Attendance: 4,108; Referee: K Nixon

== Squad statistics ==
=== Appearances and goals ===
No.	Pos	Nat	Player	Total		Fourth Division		FA Cup		League Cup		Football League Trophy	
No.	Pos	Nat	Player	Apps	Goals	Apps	Goals	Apps	Goals	Apps	Goals	Apps	Goals
	GK	(England) ENG	Alec Chamberlain	54	0	46	0	3	0	2	0	3	0
	DF	(England) ENG	Keith Day	52	4	45	4	3	0	2	0	2	0
	DF	(England) ENG	Tony English	25	3	20+2	3	0	0	0	0	2+1	0
	DF	(England) ENG	Rudi Hedman	36	2	29+1	2	1+2	0	0	0	3	0
	DF	(Scotland) SCO	Stewart Houston	35	3	28+1	1	2	1	2	1	1+1	0
	DF	(Scotland) SCO	Ian Phillips	45	1	37	1	3	0	2	0	3	0
	MF	(England) ENG	Andy Farrell	46	0	35+3	0	3	0	2	0	3	0
	MF	(England) ENG	Jeff Hull	24	5	18	5	3	0	2	0	0+1	0
	MF	(England) ENG	Roger Osborne	47	2	39+1	2	2	0	2	0	3	0
	MF	(England) ENG	Noel Parkinson	51	6	44	6	3	0	0+1	0	3	0
	FW	(England) ENG	Tony Adcock	35	28	27+1	24	3	1	2	0	2	3
	FW	(Wales) WAL	Keith Bowen	47	18	41+1	17	0+1	0	2	1	2	0
	FW	(England) ENG	Simon Burman	9	0	8+1	0	0	0	0	0	0	0
	FW	(England) ENG	Perry Groves	52	12	44	10	3	1	2	0	3	1
	FW	(England) ENG	Russell Irving	48	10	34+7	9	3	1	0+1	0	3	0
Players who appeared for Colchester who left during the season
	DF	(England) ENG	Daryl Godbold	9	1	4+2	1	1	0	2	0	0	0
	MF	(England) ENG	Stuart Youngman	1	0	0+1	0	0	0	0	0	0	0
	FW	(England) ENG	Tommy English	1	0	0	0	0	0	0	0	0+1	0
	FW	(England) ENG	Dave Hubbick	5	1	1+4	1	0	0	0	0	0	0
	FW	(England) ENG	Paul Shinners	6	1	6	1	0	0	0	0	0	0

=== Goalscorers ===
Place	Nationality	Position	Name	Fourth Division	FA Cup	League Cup	Football League Trophy	Total
1	(England)	FW	Tony Adcock	24	1	0	3	28
2	(Wales)	FW	Keith Bowen	17	0	1	0	18
3	(England)	WG	Perry Groves	10	1	0	1	12
4	(England)	FW	Russell Irving	9	1	0	0	10
5	(England)	MF	Noel Parkinson	6	0	0	0	6
6	(England)	MF	Jeff Hull	5	0	0	0	5
7	(England)	CB	Keith Day	4	0	0	0	4
8	(England)	DF/MF	Tony English	3	0	0	0	3
8	(Scotland)	CB	Stewart Houston	1	1	1	0	3
10	(England)	CB	Rudi Hedman	2	0	0	0	2
10	(England)	MF	Roger Osborne	2	0	0	0	2
12	(England)	FB	Daryl Godbold	1	0	0	0	1
12	(England)	FW	Dave Hubbick	1	0	0	0	1
12	(Scotland)	FB	Ian Phillips	1	0	0	0	1
12	(England)	FW	Paul Shinners	1	0	0	0	1
			Own goals	0	1	0	0	1
			TOTALS	87	5	2	4	98

=== Disciplinary record ===
Nationality	Position	Name	Fourth Division		FA Cup		League Cup		Football League Trophy		Total	
Nationality	Position	Name	Booked	Sent off (straight red)	Booked	Sent off (straight red)	Booked	Sent off (straight red)	Booked	Sent off (straight red)	Booked	Sent off (straight red)
(England)	WG	Perry Groves	1	1	0	0	0	0	0	0	1	1
(Scotland)	FB	Ian Phillips	4	0	0	0	0	0	0	0	4	0
(Wales)	FW	Keith Bowen	2	0	0	0	0	0	0	0	2	0
(England)	GK	Alec Chamberlain	2	0	0	0	0	0	0	0	2	0
(England)	MF	Jeff Hull	2	0	0	0	0	0	0	0	2	0
(England)	MF	Noel Parkinson	2	0	0	0	0	0	0	0	2	0
(England)	WG	Simon Burman	1	0	0	0	0	0	0	0	1	0
(England)	CB	Keith Day	1	0	0	0	0	0	0	0	0	0
(England)	DF/MF	Tony English	1	0	0	0	0	0	0	0	1	0
(England)	MF/FB	Andy Farrell	1	0	0	0	0	0	0	0	1	0
(England)	FB	Daryl Godbold	1	0	0	0	0	0	0	0	0	0
(England)	CB	Rudi Hedman	1	0	0	0	0	0	0	0	1	0
(England)	FW	Paul Shinners	1	0	0	0	0	0	0	0	1	0
		TOTALS	20	1	0	0	0	0	0	0	20	1

=== Clean sheets ===
Number of games goalkeepers kept a clean sheet.

Place	Nationality	Player	Fourth Division	FA Cup	League Cup	Football League Trophy	Total
1	(England)	Alec Chamberlain	7	0	0	1	8
		TOTALS	7	0	0	1	8

=== Player debuts ===
Players making their first-team Colchester United debut in a fully competitive match.

Position	Nationality	Player	Date	Opponent	Ground	Notes
CB	(England)	Keith Day	25 August 1984	Southend United	Layer Road	
FB	(England)	Daryl Godbold	25 August 1984	Southend United	Layer Road	
FW	(England)	Russell Irving	25 August 1984	Southend United	Layer Road	
MF	(England)	Noel Parkinson	28 August 1984	Gillingham	Priestfield Stadium	
DF/MF	(England)	Tony English	23 January 1985	Gillingham	Priestfield Stadium	
FW	(England)	Tommy English	5 February 1985	Gillingham	Layer Road	
WG/MF	(England)	Simon Burman	29 March 1985	Tranmere Rovers	Layer Road	
FW	(England)	Paul Shinners	16 April 1985	Torquay United	Plainmoor	
MF	(England)	Stuart Youngman	23 April 1985	Aldershot	Recreation Ground	

== See also ==
- List of Colchester United F.C. seasons
