= 1982–83 Colchester United F.C. season =

Colchester United
1982–83 season
- Chairman: Maurice Cadman
- Manager: Allan Hunter (until 18 January); Cyril Lea (from 1 February)
- Stadium: Layer Road
- Fourth Division: 6th
- FA Cup: 1st round (eliminated by Torquay United)
- League Cup: 2nd round (eliminated by Southampton)
- Football League Trophy: Group stage
- Top goalscorer: League: Ian Allinson (22); All: Ian Allinson (26)
- Highest home attendance: 7,679 v Southampton, 6 October 1982
- Lowest home attendance: 1,625 v Stockport County, 17 December 1982
- Average home league attendance: 2,690
- Biggest win: 5–1 v Scunthorpe United, 15 April 1983
- Biggest defeat: 0–4 v Halifax Town, 14 January 1983
Home colours

The 1982–83 season was Colchester United's 41st season in their history and second consecutive season in fourth tier of English football, the Fourth Division. Alongside competing in the Fourth Division, the club also participated in the FA Cup, the League Cup and the Football League Trophy.

Colchester challenged for the top four but once again fell short, on this occasion missing promotion by just two points. A tragic season saw forward John Lyons take his own life, while Allan Hunter resigned two months later, replaced by his assistant Cyril Lea in February.

In the cups, Colchester were entered into the second and final iteration of the Football League Trophy, which the U's exited at the group stage, which defeats to Southampton and Torquay United in the second and first round of the League and FA Cup respectively denied the club a cup run.

== Season overview ==
Allan Hunter continued in his role as player-manager for the new season, with former Ipswich Town coach Cyril Lea his assistant. Colchester led the table undefeated after seven games and earned a League Cup second round tie against Southampton. Following a 0–0 draw at Layer Road, with England international Peter Shilton in inspired form, the U's could not repeat their heroics from 1974 at The Dell, losing 4–2 and making another early exit.

The season then took a tragic turn, when in November, just hours after turning out for the U's against Chester City, forward John Lyons committed suicide at his home in Layer de la Haye. After this incident and having to give up his own playing career, Allan Hunter resigned as manager in January with Colchester in seventh place. Cyril Lea took over initially until the end of the campaign and promptly won eight of his first eleven games. However, four defeats in 17 days during April cost the U's and they finished sixth position in the league, missing promotion by just two points.

Ian Allinson ended the season as Colchester's top scorer with 26 league and cup goals, while youth graduate Tony Adcock scored 17 goals. Veteran goalkeeper Mike Walker, who had missed just nine games in ten seasons for the club, announced his retirement at the end of the season.

== Players ==
As of match played 13 May 1983.

Name	Position	Nationality	Place of birth	Date of birth	Apps	Goals	Signed from	Date signed	Fee
Goalkeepers
Alec Chamberlain	GK	(England)	March	20 June 1964 (aged 17)	0	0	(England) Ipswich Town	Summer 1982	Undisclosed
Ian Cranstone	GK	(England)	Rochford		0	0	(England) Tottenham Hotspur	Summer 1977	Free transfer
Bobby Hamilton	GK				0	0	Unknown	Summer 1977	
Defenders
Phil Coleman	FB	(England)	Woolwich	8 September 1960 (aged 21)	51	4	(England) Millwall	February 1981	£15,000
Micky Cook	FB	(England)	Enfield	9 April 1951 (aged 31)	607	21	(England) Orient	1 March 1969	Free transfer
Adrian Keith	CB	(England)	Colchester	16 December 1962 (aged 19)	0	0	(England) West Ham United	December 1982	Free transfer
Wayne Ward	FB	(England)	Colchester	28 April 1964 (aged 18)	5	0	Apprentice	April 1982	Free transfer
Steve Wignall	CB	(England)	Liverpool	17 September 1954 (aged 27)	236	12	(England) Doncaster Rovers	September 1977	£5,000
Midfielders
Andy Farrell	MF/FB	(England)	Colchester	7 October 1965 (aged 16)	0	0	Apprentice	Summer 1982	Free transfer
Andy Gooding	MF				0	0	Apprentice	Summer 1981	Free transfer
Jeff Hull	MF	(England)	Rochford	25 August 1960 (aged 21)	0	0	(England) Basildon United	17 December 1982 (Note: Date of signing refers to the date of the player's first game for the club)	Undisclosed
Steve Leslie	MF	(England)	Hornsey	4 September 1952 (aged 29)	435	44	Apprentice	20 April 1971	Free transfer
Roger Osborne	MF	(England)	Otley	9 March 1950 (aged 32)	60	5	(England) Ipswich Town	February 1981	£25,000
Forwards
Tony Adcock	FW	(England)	Bethnal Green	27 March 1963 (aged 19)	49	6	Apprentice	31 March 1981	Free transfer
Keith Bowen	FW	(Wales)	(England) Northampton	26 February 1958 (aged 24)	0	0	(England) Brentford	25 March 1983 (Note: Date of signing refers to the date of the player's first game in his second spell for the club)	£10,000
Perry Groves	WG	(England)	Bow	19 April 1965 (aged 17)	9	0	(England) Cornard Dynamos	Summer 1981	Free transfer
Roy McDonough	FW	(England)	Solihull	16 October 1958 (aged 23)	62	18	(England) Chelsea	February 1981	£15,000
Craig Oldfield	FW	(England)	Warley	24 November 1963 (aged 18)	0	0	(England) Stowmarket Town	Summer 1982	Free transfer
John Taylor	FW	(England)	Norwich	24 October 1964 (aged 17)	0	0	Apprentice	Summer 1981	Free transfer

== Transfers ==
=== In ===
Date	Position	Nationality	Name	From	Fee	Ref.
Summer 1982	GK	(England)	Alec Chamberlain	(England) Ipswich Town	Undisclosed	
Summer 1982	CB	(England)	Kevin Beattie	Free agent	Free transfer	
Summer 1982	MF/FB	(England)	Andy Farrell	Apprentice	Free transfer	
Summer 1982	FW	(England)	Craig Oldfield	(England) Stowmarket Town	Free transfer	
December 1982	CB	(England)	Adrian Keith	(England) West Ham United	Free transfer	
17 December 1982	MF	(England)	Jeff Hull	(England) Basildon United	Undisclosed	(Note: Date of signing refers to the date of the player's first game for the club)
25 March 1983	FW	(Wales)	Keith Bowen	(England) Brentford	£10,000	(Note: Date of signing refers to the date of the player's first game in his second spell for the club)

- Total spending: ▼ ~ £10,000

=== Out ===
Date	Position	Nationality	Name	To	Fee	Ref.
End of season	GK	(England)	Jeff Wood	(Finland) HJK Helsinki	Free transfer	
November 1982	CB	(England)	Kevin Beattie	(England) Middlesbrough	Free transfer	
9 November 1982	FW	(Wales)	John Lyons			(Note: Date of departure refers to the date of the player's final game for the club) (Note: John Lyons committed suicide on 10 November 1982)
January 1983	CB	(Northern Ireland)	Allan Hunter	Free agent	Retired	(Note: Allan Hunter resigned from his position as player-manager at Colchester United on 18 January)
February 1983	FW	(Scotland)	Kevin Bremner	(England) Millwall	£25,000	
22 April 1983	MF	(England)	Dennis Longhorn	(England) Chelmsford City	Released	
2 May 1983	GK	(Wales)	Mike Walker	Free agent	Retired	(Note: Mike Walker joined Colchester United's coaching staff after retiring from playing)
13 May 1983	FB	(England)	Mick Packer	(England) Wivenhoe Town	Became player-manager	
13 May 1983	WG	(England)	Ian Allinson	(England) Arsenal	Free transfer	

- Total incoming: ▲ ~ £25,000

=== Loans in ===
Date	Position	Nationality	Name	From	End date	Ref.
1 January 1983	FW	(England)	John Linford	(England) Ipswich Town	1 March 1983	(Note: Loan end date refers to the date of the player's final game for the club)
12 March 1983	FW	(Wales)	Keith Bowen	(England) Brentford	19 March 1983	(Note: Loan start and end dates refer to the date of the player's first and final games for the club)

=== Loans out ===
Date	Position	Nationality	Name	To	End date	Ref.
October 1982	FW	(Scotland)	Kevin Bremner	(England) Birmingham City	October 1982	
December 1982	FW	(Scotland)	Kevin Bremner	(Wales) Wrexham	December 1982	
January 1983	FW	(Scotland)	Kevin Bremner	(England) Plymouth Argyle	January 1983	

== Match details ==
=== Fourth Division ===
==== Results round by round ====
Round	1	2	3	4	5	6	7	8	9	10	11	12	13	14	15	16	17	18	19	20	21	22	23	24	25	26	27	28	29	30	31	32	33	34	35	36	37	38	39	40	41	42	43	44	45	46
Ground	H	A	A	H	A	H	H	A	A	H	A	A	H	H	H	A	A	H	A	H	A	H	A	H	H	A	H	A	A	H	A	H	A	H	A	H	H	A	A	H	H	A	A	H	A	H
Result	W	D	D	W	W	W	D	L	L	D	L	L	W	W	W	W	W	D	L	W	L	D	L	W	W	L	W	W	L	W	W	W	D	W	D	D	W	W	L	L	W	L	L	W	W	W
Position	7	9	3	1	1	1	2	5	8	8	10	13	10	9	8	7	6	6	7	5	7	7	8	7	7	7	6	6	7	5	5	5	5	5	5	5	5	5	5	5	5	5	6	5	5	5

Source: 11v11.com
A = Away; H = Home; W = Win; D = Draw; L = Loss

==== League table ====
Pos	Team	Pld	W	D	L	GF	GA	GD	Pts	Promotion
4	Scunthorpe United (P)	46	23	14	9	71	42	+29	83	Promotion to the Third Division
5	Bury	46	23	12	11	74	46	+28	81	
6	Colchester United	46	24	9	13	75	55	+20	81	
7	York City	46	22	13	11	88	58	+30	79	
8	Swindon Town	46	19	11	16	61	54	+7	68	

(P) Promoted

==== Matches ====
28 August 1982 1	Colchester United	1–0	Halifax Town	Colchester
	McDonough 47'	Report		Stadium: Layer Road; Attendance: 2,610; Referee: Rob Lewis

4 September 1982 2	Hereford United	0–0	Colchester United	Hereford
	Crabbe (red card) 65'	Report		Stadium: Edgar Street; Attendance: 2,465; Referee: L Robinson

6 September 1982 3	Port Vale	0–0	Colchester United	Burslem
		Report		Stadium: Vale Park; Attendance: 2,877; Referee: Vic Callow

10 September 1982 4	Colchester United	4–1	Rochdale	Colchester
	Allinson 44' (pen.); Wignall 45'; Lyons 49', 90'	Report	Wellings 17' (pen.)	Stadium: Layer Road; Attendance: 2,836; Referee: D Brazier

17 September 1982 5	Crewe Alexandra	0–1	Colchester United	Crewe
		Report	Lyons 33'	Stadium: Gresty Road; Attendance: 2,539

25 September 1982 6	Colchester United	4–1	Blackpool	Colchester
15:00 BST	Lyons 27'; Leslie 37'; Groves 63'; Allinson 85'	Report	Pashley 36' (pen.)	Stadium: Layer Road; Attendance: 2,918; Referee: Ian Borrett

28 September 1982 7	Colchester United	0–0	Hull City	Colchester
19:30 BST		Report		Stadium: Layer Road; Attendance: 3,071; Referee: Colin Downey

2 October 1982 8	Scunthorpe United	2–1	Colchester United	Scunthorpe
	O'Berg 32'; Angus 48'	Report	Osborne 50'	Stadium: Old Showground; Attendance: 2,616; Referee: A Robinson

10 October 1982 9	Swindon Town	3–0	Colchester United	Swindon
15:00 BST	Rideout 36' (pen.); Rowland 44', 53'	Report		Stadium: County Ground; Attendance: 4,473; Referee: L Burden

15 October 1982 10	Colchester United	2–2	Darlington	Colchester
	Allinson 14'; McDonough 65'	Report	Walsh 50', 56'	Stadium: Layer Road; Attendance: 2,547; Referee: D Letts

19 October 1982 11	Northampton Town	2–1	Colchester United	Northampton
19:30 BST	Denyer 46'; Burrows 88'	Report	Allinson 85'	Stadium: County Ground; Attendance: 1,955; Referee: T Spencer

30 October 1982 12	Bury	1–0	Colchester United	Bury
	Parker 63'	Report		Stadium: Gigg Lane; Attendance: 2,653; Referee: G Tyson

2 November 1982 13	Colchester United	3–0	Wimbledon	Colchester
19:30 GMT	Allinson 31'; McDonough 52', 70'	Report		Stadium: Layer Road; Attendance: 2,219; Referee: H Taylor

6 November 1982 14	Colchester United	2–0	Mansfield Town	Colchester
	Lyons 9', 44'; Cook (red card) 50'	Report		Stadium: Layer Road; Attendance: 2,009; Referee: J Martin

9 November 1982 15	Colchester United	1–0	Chester City	Colchester
	Wignall 84'	Report		Stadium: Layer Road; Attendance: 2,362; Referee: Tony Ward

13 November 1982 16	Tranmere Rovers	2–4	Colchester United	Birkenhead
	Mungall 43'; Kerr 74'	Report	McDonough 1'; Allinson 3', 20'; Adcock 82'	Stadium: Prenton Park; Attendance: 1,410

27 November 1982 17	Bristol City	0–2	Colchester United	Bristol
		Report	Bremner 12'; Allinson 85'	Stadium: Ashton Gate Stadium; Attendance: 4,310; Referee: Tom Bune

3 December 1982 18	Colchester United	0–0	York City	Colchester
19:30 GMT	Wignall (red card) 20'	Report	Byrne (red card) 20'	Stadium: Layer Road; Attendance: 2,214; Referee: Alan Gunn

11 December 1982 19	Hull City	3–0	Colchester United	Kingston upon Hull
	Flounders 69', 81'; Hawley 77'	Report		Stadium: Boothferry Park; Attendance: 4,323; Referee: David Hutchinson

17 December 1982 20	Colchester United	3–0	Stockport County	Colchester
19:30 GMT	Allinson 24', 70'; McDonough 51'	Report		Stadium: Layer Road; Attendance: 1,625; Referee: Alf Grey

27 December 1982 21	Peterborough United	2–1	Colchester United	Peterborough
	Winters 6'; Firm 70'	Report	Bremner 44'; McDonough (red card) 34'; Packer (red card) 69'	Stadium: London Road Stadium; Attendance: 4,235; Referee: J Key

28 December 1982 22	Colchester United	0–0	Aldershot	Colchester
19:30 GMT		Report		Stadium: Layer Road; Attendance: 2,463; Referee: J Deakin

1 January 1983 23	Torquay United	2–0	Colchester United	Torquay
	Cooper 16'; Hughes 85'	Report		Stadium: Plainmoor; Attendance: 2,758; Referee: A Glasson

3 January 1983 24	Colchester United	4–1	Hartlepool United	Colchester
	Allinson 14'; Adcock 22', 85'; Wignall 44'	Report	Brown 20'	Stadium: Layer Road; Attendance: 2,239; Referee: M James

7 January 1983 25	Colchester United	3–2	Hereford United	Colchester
19:30 GMT	Allinson 22' (pen.), 34'; Adcock 59'	Report	Harvey 4'; Bartley 52'	Stadium: Layer Road; Attendance: 2,216; Referee: D Reeves

14 January 1983 26	Halifax Town	4–0	Colchester United	Halifax
	Nuttall 31'; Staniforth 34', 83', 86'	Report		Stadium: The Shay; Attendance: 1,863; Referee: R Guy

21 January 1983 27	Colchester United	4–3	Crewe Alexandra	Colchester
15:00 GMT	Adcock 8', 37', 86'; Allinson 11' (pen.)	Report	Cliss 9', 69'; Bancroft 90'	Stadium: Layer Road; Attendance: 2,221; Referee: K Salmon

5 February 1983 28	Blackpool	1–2	Colchester United	Blackpool
	Hetzke 75'	Report	Adcock 50'; Hull 61'	Stadium: Bloomfield Road; Attendance: 1,747; Referee: P Tyldesley

15 February 1983 29	Wimbledon	2–1	Colchester United	Wimbledon
19:30 GMT	Smith 70'; Hodges 72'	Report	Adcock 20'	Stadium: Plough Lane; Attendance: 1,753; Referee: L Shapter

18 February 1983 30	Colchester United	1–0	Swindon Town	Colchester
19:30 GMT	Cook 71'	Report		Stadium: Layer Road; Attendance: 2,386; Referee: Martin Bodenham

26 February 1983 31	Darlington	1–3	Colchester United	Darlington
	McLean 72' (pen.)	Report	McDonough 9'; Adcock 41', 57'	Stadium: Feethams; Attendance: 1,089; Referee: A Challinor

1 March 1983 32	Colchester United	3–1	Northampton Town	Colchester
19:30 GMT	Allinson 25' (pen.); Hull 56'; Adcock 66'	Report	Massey 2'	Stadium: Layer Road; Attendance: 2,501; Referee: M Taylor

5 March 1983 33	Chester City	1–1	Colchester United	Chester
	Simpson 61'	Report	Adcock 56'	Stadium: Sealand Road; Attendance: 1,136; Referee: Keith Cooper

12 March 1983 34	Colchester United	2–1	Bury	Colchester
15:00 GMT	Allinson 38'; Bowen 44'	Report	Potts 83'	Stadium: Layer Road; Attendance: 3,357; Referee: M Dimblebee

19 March 1983 35	Mansfield Town	1–1	Colchester United	Mansfield
	Nicholson 81'	Report	Hull 48'	Stadium: Field Mill; Attendance: 2,371; Referee: R Bridges

25 March 1983 36	Colchester United	3–3	Tranmere Rovers	Colchester
19:30 GMT	Osborne 4'; Bowen 47'; Adcock 60'	Report	Griffiths 12'; Aspinall 44'; Brown 75'	Stadium: Layer Road; Attendance: 2,547; Referee: E Scales

1 April 1983 37	Colchester United	1–0	Peterborough United	Colchester
	Allinson 9'	Report		Stadium: Layer Road; Attendance: 3,759; Referee: Rob Lewis

2 April 1983 38	Aldershot	0–1	Colchester United	Aldershot
		Report	Hull 34'	Stadium: Recreation Ground; Attendance: 1,670; Referee: M Robinson

9 April 1983 39	York City	3–0	Colchester United	York
	Busby 37'; Pollard 48' (pen.); Senior 89'	Report		Stadium: Bootham Crescent; Attendance: 2,538; Referee: R Nixon

12 April 1983 40	Colchester United	1–2	Port Vale	Colchester
	Adcock 2'	Report	Newton 18'; Fox 76'	Stadium: Layer Road; Attendance: 3,275; Referee: D Hedges

15 April 1983 41	Colchester United	5–1	Scunthorpe United	Colchester
19:30 BST	Adcock 9', 54'; Allinson 10', 81' (pen.); Bowen 89'	Report	Cammack 17'	Stadium: Layer Road; Attendance: 3,155; Referee: Ian Borrett

22 April 1983 42	Stockport County	3–0	Colchester United	Stockport
19:30 BST	Smith 16'; Coyle 63'; Quinn 64'	Report		Stadium: Edgeley Park; Attendance: 1,733; Referee: H Wilson

26 April 1983 43	Rochdale	2–1	Colchester United	Rochdale
	Higgins 22'; French 32'	Report	Allinson 80'	Stadium: Spotland Stadium; Attendance: 1,219; Referee: M Peck

29 April 1983 44	Colchester United	3–1	Bristol City	Colchester
19:30 BST	Allinson 35' (pen.); Bowen 39'; McDonough 87'	Report	Ritchie 41' (pen.)	Stadium: Layer Road; Attendance: 2,196; Referee: Tony Ward

2 May 1983 45	Hartlepool United	1–4	Colchester United	Hartlepool
11:45 BST	Linacre 74'	Report	Allinson 32'; Coleman 65', 66'; Groves 80'	Stadium: Victoria Park; Attendance: 804; Referee: D Shaw

13 May 1983 46	Colchester United	1–0	Torquay United	Colchester
	Wignall 71'	Report		Stadium: Layer Road; Attendance: 2,181; Referee: Alan Gunn

=== Football League Trophy ===
Team	Pld	W	D	L	GF	GA	GD	BP	Pts
Watford	3	3	0	0	10	3	+7	2	11
Colchester United	3	2	0	1	6	3	+3	1	7
Southend United	3	0	1	2	3	8	−5	0	1
Orient	3	0	1	2	2	7	−5	0	1

13 August 1982 1st round	Colchester United	3–1	Southend United	Colchester
	Coleman 36'; Allinson 46'; Lyons 85'	Report	Cusack 34'	Stadium: Layer Road; Attendance: 1,662; Referee: K Salmon

17 August 1982 1st round	Watford	2–1	Colchester United	Watford
19:30 BST	Blissett 72'; Jenkins 79'	Report	Allinson 80'	Stadium: Vicarage Road; Attendance: 3,837; Referee: D Hedges

21 August 1982 1st round	Orient	0–2	Colchester United	Leyton
15:00 BST		Report	Lyons 60', 89'	Stadium: Brisbane Road; Attendance: 1,384; Referee: K Baker

=== League Cup ===
31 August 1982 1st round 1st leg	Colchester United	2–0	Aldershot	Colchester
	Wignall 12'; Groves 35'	Report		Stadium: Layer Road; Attendance: 1,665; Referee: M Dimblebee

14 September 1982 1st round 2nd leg	Aldershot	0–1	Colchester United	Aldershot
		Report	Allinson 85'	Stadium: Recreation Ground; Attendance: 1,680; Referee: M Taylor
Note: Colchester won 3–0 on aggregate

6 October 1982 2nd round 1st leg	Colchester United	0–0	Southampton	Colchester
19:30 BST		Report		Stadium: Layer Road; Attendance: 7,679; Referee: B Hill

26 October 1982 2nd round 2nd leg	Southampton	4–2	Colchester United	Southampton
	Wallace 28'; Cassells 40'; Armstrong 73'; Moran 90'	Report	Allinson 14' (pen.); Lyons 50'	Stadium: The Dell; Referee: E Read
Note: Southampton won 4–2 on aggregate

=== FA Cup ===
20 November 1982 1st round	Colchester United	0–2	Torquay United	Colchester
		Report	Little 34'; Cooper 62'; Grapes (red card) 40'	Stadium: Layer Road; Attendance: 2,913; Referee: D Reeves

== Squad statistics ==
=== Appearances and goals ===
No.	Pos	Nat	Player	Total		Fourth Division		FA Cup		League Cup		Football League Trophy	
No.	Pos	Nat	Player	Apps	Goals	Apps	Goals	Apps	Goals	Apps	Goals	Apps	Goals
	GK	(England) ENG	Alec Chamberlain	4	0	4	0	0	0	0	0	0	0
	DF	(England) ENG	Phil Coleman	45	3	37	2	1	0	4	0	3	1
	DF	(England) ENG	Micky Cook	48	1	41	1	0	0	4	0	3	0
	DF	(England) ENG	Adrian Keith	4	0	4	0	0	0	0	0	0	0
	DF	(England) ENG	Wayne Ward	16	0	14	0	1	0	1	0	0	0
	DF	(England) ENG	Steve Wignall	52	5	44	4	1	0	4	1	3	0
	MF	(England) ENG	Jeff Hull	27	4	27	4	0	0	0	0	0	0
	MF	(England) ENG	Steve Leslie	36	1	26+3	1	1	0	4	0	1+1	0
	MF	(England) ENG	Roger Osborne	53	2	45	2	1	0	4	0	3	0
	FW	(England) ENG	Tony Adcock	34	17	26+4	17	0+1	0	1	0	2	0
	FW	(Wales) WAL	Keith Bowen	13	4	13	4	0	0	0	0	0	0
	FW	(England) ENG	Perry Groves	22	3	8+9	2	0	0	2	1	3	0
	FW	(England) ENG	Roy McDonough	49	8	38+3	8	1	0	4	0	2+1	0
Players who appeared for Colchester who left during the season
	GK	(Wales) WAL	Mike Walker	50	0	42	0	1	0	4	0	3	0
	DF	(England) ENG	Kevin Beattie	7	0	3+1	0	0	0	1	0	2	0
	DF	(Northern Ireland) NIR	Allan Hunter	25	0	17+1	0	1	0	3	0	1+2	0
	DF	(England) ENG	Mick Packer	12	0	12	0	0	0	0	0	0	0
	MF	(England) ENG	Dennis Longhorn	29	0	27+1	0	1	0	0	0	0	0
	FW	(England) ENG	Ian Allinson	54	26	46	22	1	0	4	2	3	2
	FW	(Scotland) SCO	Kevin Bremner	19	2	10+5	2	1	0	0+2	0	1	0
	FW	(England) ENG	John Linford	7	0	7	0	0	0	0	0	0	0
	FW	(Wales) WAL	John Lyons	22	10	15	6	0	0	4	1	3	3

=== Goalscorers ===
Place	Nationality	Position	Name	Fourth Division	FA Cup	League Cup	Football League Trophy	Total
1	(England)	WG	Ian Allinson	22	0	2	2	26
2	(England)	FW	Tony Adcock	17	0	0	0	17
3	(Wales)	FW	John Lyons	6	0	1	3	10
4	(England)	FW	Roy McDonough	8	0	0	0	8
5	(England)	CB	Steve Wignall	4	0	1	0	5
6	(Wales)	FW	Keith Bowen	4	0	0	0	4
6	(England)	MF	Jeff Hull	4	0	0	0	4
8	(England)	FB	Phil Coleman	2	0	0	1	3
8	(England)	WG	Perry Groves	2	0	1	0	3
10	(Scotland)	FW	Kevin Bremner	2	0	0	0	2
10	(England)	MF	Roger Osborne	2	0	0	0	2
12	(England)	FB	Micky Cook	1	0	0	0	1
12	(England)	MF	Steve Leslie	1	0	0	0	1
			Own goals	0	0	0	0	0
			TOTALS	75	0	5	6	86

=== Disciplinary record ===
Nationality	Position	Name	Fourth Division		FA Cup		League Cup		Football League Trophy		Total	
Nationality	Position	Name	Yellow card	Red card	Yellow card	Red card	Yellow card	Red card	Yellow card	Red card	Yellow card	Red card
(England)	FB	Micky Cook	0	1	0	0	0	0	0	0	0	1
(England)	FW	Roy McDonough	0	1	0	0	0	0	0	0	0	1
(England)	FB	Mick Packer	0	1	0	0	0	0	0	0	0	1
(England)	CB	Steve Wignall	0	1	0	0	0	0	0	0	0	1
		TOTALS	0	4	0	0	0	0	0	0	0	4

=== Clean sheets ===
Number of games goalkeepers kept a clean sheet.

Place	Nationality	Player	Fourth Division	FA Cup	League Cup	Football League Trophy	Total
1	(Wales)	Mike Walker	15	0	3	1	19
2	(England)	Alec Chamberlain	1	0	0	0	1
		TOTALS	16	0	3	1	20

=== Player debuts ===
Players making their first-team Colchester United debut in a fully competitive match.

Position	Nationality	Player	Date	Opponent	Ground	Notes
CB	(England)	Kevin Beattie	17 August 1982	Watford	Vicarage Road	
MF	(England)	Jeff Hull	17 December 1982	Stockport County	Layer Road	
CB	(England)	Adrian Keith	1 January 1983	Torquay United	Plainmoor	
GK	(England)	Alec Chamberlain	3 January 1983	Hartlepool United	Layer Road	
FW	(England)	John Linford	14 January 1983	Halifax Town	The Shay	
FW	(Wales)	Keith Bowen	12 March 1983	Bury	Layer Road	
FW	(Wales)	Keith Bowen	25 March 1983	Tranmere Rovers	Layer Road	(Note: Second debut for the club)

== See also ==
- List of Colchester United F.C. seasons
