= 1989 FA Vase final =

- Programme covers for the final and replay.
- Event: 1988–89 FA Vase
Sudbury Town	Tamworth

FA Vase Final
Sudbury Town	Tamworth
1	1
- After extra time
- Date: 6 May 1989
- Venue: Wembley Stadium, London
- Referee: Danny Vickers (Ilford)
- Attendance: 26,487

Replay
Sudbury Town	Tamworth
0	3
- Date: 10 May 1989
- Venue: London Road, Peterborough
- Referee: Danny Vickers (Ilford)
- Attendance: 11,201

The 1989 FA Vase final was contested by Sudbury Town and Tamworth at Wembley in London in front of a record 26,487 crowd for an FA Vase Final. The original match, played on 6 May 1989, finished 1–1. Tamworth won the replay at London Road in Peterborough on 10 May, 3–0.

== Route to the final ==
The FA Vase is an annual football competition for teams playing below Step 4 of the English National League System.

=== Tamworth ===
Tamworth
Round	Opposition	Score
2nd	Bridgnorth Town (h)	2–1
3rd	Gresley Rovers (a)	3–1 (a.e.t.)
4th	Ilkeston Town (a)	2–1
5th	Eastwood Hanley (a)	1–0
QF	Wisbech Town (h)	1–0
SF	North Ferriby United (h); North Ferriby United (a)	1–2; 3–1
Key: (h) = Home venue; (a) = Away venue; (n) = Neutral venue.

Tamworth began their cup run with a home tie against Southern Football League Midland Division rivals Bridgnorth Town. They won the game 2-1 with goals coming from Mark Stanton and Russell Gordon. Former Tottenham Hotspur, Stoke City and Bolton Wanderers striker, Ian Moores, joined the club in February and made his Vase debut in the semi-final against North Ferriby United. Captain Andy Foote snapped his hamstring on the Thursday before the final and was replaced by Steve Cartwright.

=== Sudbury Town ===
Sudbury
Round	Opposition	Score
2nd	Baldock Town (h)	2-0
3rd	March Town (a)	2-1
4th	Hounslow (a)	1-0
5th	Rossendale United (a)	1-0
QF	Bashley (h)	2-0
SF	Hungerford Town (a); Hungerford Town (h)	0–0; 6–0
Key: (h) = Home venue; (a) = Away venue; (n) = Neutral venue.

Under a new management team of Don James and Martin Head, Sudbury Town had reached the semi-finals of the Vase in the previous year. Against a difficult set of opponents on their route to the final in the 1988-89 season, they only conceded one goal, a penalty scored by March Town in the third round. In the fourth round game, away against Beazer Homes League Southern League Hounslow, Mick Money was sent off after an hour but Sudbury held on for a 1-0 win. In the fifth round, they beat Rossendale United who in the fourth round had beaten last year's finalists, Emley, who in turn had knocked out the previous year's winners, Colne Dynamoes. A record home crowd of 4,320 saw a 6-0 victory over Hungerford Town in the second leg of the semi-final to see the team reach Wembley.

== Match details ==
=== Summary ===
In the final at Wembley, Dave Hubbick opened the scoring for Sudbury with a header after 6 minutes, following a cross by Bryan Klug. In the thirteenth minute, Klug had a corner cleared off the goal-line and Dean Barker's follow up shot was blocked. Martin Devaney equalised for Tamworth after half-time. Martin Myers on the right-hand side for Tamworth was effective and led Sudbury to make a double substitution. The game went to extra-time and when the whistle was blown after the first 15 minutes of extra-time, Mike Henry threw a punch at Russell Gordon and, although the referee did not see it, the linesman ran on to the pitch and Henry was sent off. Sudbury's man of the match, according to the East Anglian Daily Times, was Hubbick. The players climbed the steps of Wembley to be presented to chief guest Pat Jennings.

6 May 1989
15:00 BST

Sudbury Town	1–1 (a.e.t.)	Tamworth
Hubbick 6'	Report	Devaney 49'

Wembley, London
Attendance: 26,478
Referee: Danny Vickers (Ilford)

Sudbury Town	Tamworth

GK	1	(England) Dean Garnham
DF	2	(England) Michael Henry	(red card) 105'
DF	3	(England) Marty Thorpe
DF	4	(England) Gary Barker(c)
DF	5	(England) Phil Boyland
MF	6	(England) Dean Barker
FW	7	(England) Craig Oldfield (substituted off) 64'
MF	8	(England) Bryan Klug
FW	9	(England) Dave Hubbick
FW	10	(England) Paul Smith
MF	11	(England) Nigel Barton (substituted off) 64'
Substitutes:
DF	12	(England) Adrian Hunt (substituted on) 64'
FW	14	(England) Mick Money (substituted on) 64'
Managers:
(England) Don James and Martin Head

GK	1	(England) Dale Belford
DF	2	(England) Corrigan Lockett
DF	3	(England) Danny McCormack (substituted off) 85'
DF	4	(England) Bobby Atkins (c)
DF	5	(England) Steve Cartwright
MF	6	(England) Martin Devaney
MF	7	(England) Martin Myers
MF	8	(England) Martin Finn
MF	9	(England) Mark Stanton
FW	10	(England) Russell Gordon
FW	11	(England) Ian Moores (substituted off) 75'
Substitutes:
MF		(England) Paul Heaton (substituted on) 85'
FW		(England) Carl Rathbone (substituted on) 75'
Manager:
(England) Graham Smith

Linesmen:
Mr C. J . Henderson (Ripley)
Mr D. M. Charmley (Failsworth)

Match rules

- 90 minutes.
- 30 minutes of extra-time if necessary.
- Replay if scores still level.
- Two named substitutes.
- Maximum of two substitutions.

=== Replay ===
10 May 1989
19:30 BST

Sudbury Town	0–3	Tamworth
	Report	Stanton; Stanton; Moores

London Road, Peterborough
Attendance: 11,201
Referee: Danny Vickers (Ilford)

Sudbury Town	Tamworth

GK	1	(England) Dean Garnham
DF	2	(England) Michael Henry
DF	3	(England) Marty Thorpe
DF	4	(England) Gary Barker(c)
DF	5	(England) Phil Boyland
MF	6	(England) Dean Barker
FW	7	(England) Craig Oldfield
MF	8	(England) Bryan Klug
FW	9	(England) Dave Hubbick
FW	10	(England) Paul Smith
MF	11	(England) Nigel Barton
Substitutes:
DF	12	(England) Adrian Hunt
FW	14	(England) Mick Money
Managers:
(England) Don James and Martin Head

GK	1	(England) Dale Belford
DF	2	(England) Corrigan Lockett
DF	3	(England) Martin Finn
DF	4	(England) Bobby Atkins (c)
DF	5	(England) Steve Cartwright
MF	6	(England) Martin Devaney
MF	7	(England) Martin Myers
MF	8	(Wales) Mickey George
MF	9	(England) Mark Stanton
FW	10	(England) Russell Gordon
FW	11	(England) Ian Moores
Substitutes:
MF		(England) Paul Heaton
MF		(Republic of Ireland) Stephen Gallagher
Manager:
(England) Graham Smith

Linesmen:

Match rules

- 90 minutes.
- 30 minutes of extra-time if necessary.
- Penalty shoot-out if scores still level.
- Two named substitutes.
- Maximum of two substitutions.
