= Charlie Hurst =

English footballer and manager

Personal information
- Full name: Charles Hurst
- Date of birth: 25 January 1919
- Place of birth: Denton, England
- Date of death: 23 January 1999 (aged 79)
- Place of death: Chelmsford, England
- Height: 5 ft 8 in (1.73 m)
- Position: Centre half

Senior career*
Years	Team	Apps	(Gls)
- Hyde United
1938–1943	Bristol Rovers		
1943–1946	Oldham Athletic		
1946	→ Chelmsford City (guest)	1	(0)
1946–1947	Rochdale	4	(1)
1947–1948	Mossley	1	(1)
1949–1950	Chelmsford City	25	(1)
1950–1951	Sudbury Town		
1952	Chelmsford City	1	(0)

Managerial career
- 1950–1951: Sudbury Town
- Halstead Town
- * Club domestic league appearances and goals

Charles Hurst (25 January 1919 – 23 January 1999) was an English footballer who played as a centre half for various clubs including Bristol Rovers, Oldham Athletic and Rochdale.

== Playing career ==
Hurst was born in Denton, Lancashire and started his football career with Hyde United in the 1930s before playing for Bristol Rovers, Oldham Athletic and Rochdale. The Second World War, which took the best years of his footballing career, saw him serve in the British Army and he was one of the many soldiers rescued during the Dunkirk evacuation in 1940. After the war had finished he returned to play for Oldham and then Rochdale Scoring against New Brighton before moving south, ending his footballing career playing non-league football for Chelmsford City and Sudbury Town.

He played in one match for Mossley, scoring a goal in the 1947–48 season.

Hurst became player-manager of Sudbury Town in the 1950–51 season. He took the team to the final of the Suffolk Senior Cup and third place in the Essex & Suffolk Border League.

== Personal life ==
Hurst was the father of England player and World Cup winner, Geoff Hurst. After finishing playing football he worked as a toolmaker in Essex. He died two days before his 80th birthday in 1999.
