= Ray Warne =

English footballer

Personal information
- Date of birth: 16 June 1929
- Place of birth: Ipswich, United Kingdom
- Date of death: 21 May 2009 (aged 79)
- Place of death: Ipswich, United Kingdom
- Position: Striker

Senior career*
Years	Team	Apps	(Gls)
- Leiston
1950–1952	Ipswich Town	30	(11)
1952–1953	Sudbury Town		
1953–1954	Cheltenham Town		
1954–1963	Sudbury Town		
- * Club domestic league appearances and goals

Raymond John Warne (16 June 1929 – 21 May 2009) was an English professional footballer who played for Ipswich Town between 1950 and 1952. A prolific striker, he scored 377 goals for Sudbury Town in twelve seasons at the club.

== Biography ==
Warne was born in Ipswich in 1929. He began his football career in non-League and was playing for Leiston when he signed for Ipswich in 1950. Warne started in the club's "A" team, then playing in the Eastern Counties League. His first match was against King's Lynn on 19 August; he scored once as the team won 4–3. After scoring three goals in three games for the "A" team and two in an East Anglian Cup match, he was promoted to the reserve team in November, making his first appearance for the reserves in a Football Combination match against Southampton, scoring once in a 4–3 win. After four goals in four reserve team games, and two goals in an Eastern Counties League Cup match, he was promoted to the first team in December.

He made his full Ipswich debut in a Third Division South match at Plymouth Argyle on 23 December, scoring once in a 2–1 defeat. He scored on his home debut against Walsall on 6 January, going on to make 22 first team appearances in the league, scoring 11 goals. The following season he made four appearances in August and September without scoring, after which he largely played for the reserve team. His final first-team appearance was a 1–1 draw with Bristol City on 26 January 1952. In total he played 30 league matches for Ipswich, scoring 11 goals. In September 1952 he returned to non-League football, signing for Sudbury Town, where he scored 51 goals in his first season as Sudbury won the Essex & Suffolk Border League. He then signed for Cheltenham Town, before returning to Sudbury for the 1953–54 season, when was again the club's leading goalscorer with 42 goals. The following season, Sudbury's first in the Eastern Counties League, he scored 47 goals. He played for Sudbury for another nine seasons, finishing as top scorer in all but three and scoring 377 goals in total.

He died in Ipswich in 2009.
