= Russell Irving =

English footballer

Personal information
- Date of birth: 4 January 1964 (age 62)
- Place of birth: Wallsend, England
- Position: Forward

Youth career
- Wallsend Boys Club

Senior career*
Years	Team	Apps	(Gls)
1981–1984	Ipswich Town	0	(0)
1984–1986	Colchester United	50	(9)
1986	Sudbury Town		
1987–1988	New Plymouth Old Boys	43	(32)
1989	Moturoa	19	(11)
1990	New Plymouth Old Boys	9	(1)
- * Club domestic league appearances and goals

Russell Irving (born 4 January 1964) is an English former professional footballer.

== Biography ==
Born in Wallsend, Irving played for the Wallsend Boys Club, before joining Ipswich Town. He failed to make a first team appearance for the club, and joined Colchester United in 1984. After 50 league appearances, he signed for non-League Sudbury Town in 1986.

In 1987 Irving moved to New Plymouth, New Zealand to play for the New Plymouth Old Boys in the Central League. He returned to England in 1988. In 1989 Irving signed a one-year contract with Moturoa AFC, scoring 13 goals and helping the club gain promotion to the Central League First Division. In 1990 Irving returned to New Plymouth Old Boys, who had gained promotion to the New Zealand National League. Irving also represented the Taranaki provincial team in inter-regional tournaments of the time while living in New Zealand.
