= Craig Oldfield =

English footballer

Personal information
- Full name: Craig Oldfield
- Date of birth: 24 November 1963 (age 62)
- Place of birth: Warley, England
- Height: 5 ft 11 in (1.80 m)
- Position: Forward

Senior career*
Years	Team	Apps	(Gls)
- Stowmarket Town
1982–1984	Colchester United	3	(0)
- Bury Town
- Stowmarket Town
- Sudbury Town
Total		3	(0)
- * Club domestic league appearances and goals

Craig Oldfield (born 24 November 1963) is an English former footballer who played in the Football League as a forward for Colchester United.

== Career ==
Born in Warley, Oldfield was signed to Colchester United from Stowmarket Town at the beginning of the 1982–83 season. In the opening game of the season between Colchester reserves and Stowmarket, Oldfield was listed in the match programme for both teams, playing and scoring for Stowmarket in a 1–1 draw at Layer Road before switching to Colchester on non-contract terms. He featured regularly in the U's reserves but was unable to force his way into the first-team picture, with the club already possessing a number of attacking players, including Tony Adcock, Keith Bowen, Perry Groves and Ian Allinson. He went on to eventually make his debut on 3 September 1983 in a 2–1 win at Layer Road over Blackpool, coming on as a substitute for Groves. He made three league appearances for the club, all from the substitutes bench. He played his last game for the club on 21 February 1984 in a 2–1 Associate Members Cup win against Wimbledon, on this occasion coming on for Les Mutrie.

Having failed to establish himself in the first-team, Oldfield had a long career in non-league football in the Suffolk area, moving to Bury Town and returning to Stowmarket, and later appearing at Wembley in the final of the FA Vase with Sudbury Town in 1989, losing the replay at London Road after drawing 1–1 at Wembley.

== Honours ==
Sudbury Town

- 1989 FA Vase runner-up

All honours referenced by:
