= Adam Nichols =

English footballer

Personal information
- Full name: Adam Anthony Nichols
- Date of birth: 14 September 1962 (age 64)
- Place of birth: Ilford, London, England
- Height: 6 ft 1 in (1.85 m)
- Position: Defender

Youth career
- 1978–1981: Ipswich Town

Senior career*
Years	Team	Apps	(Gls)
1981–1983	Wits University		
1983–1984	Colchester United	6	(1)
Total		6	(1)
- * Club domestic league appearances and goals

Adam Anthony Nichols (born 14 September 1962) is an English former footballer who played in the Football League as a defender for Colchester United.

== Career ==
Born in Ilford, London, Nichols started his career at Ipswich Town as an apprentice, making nine youth team appearances, scoring eight times, and scoring twice in 27 reserve team games. He signed professional terms in 1979 but failed to break into the Ipswich first-team squad. He then moved to South Africa to play for Wits University.

In September 1983, Colchester United manager Cyril Lea signed Nichols on non-contract terms, making his debut for the club on 18 October in a 1–0 win against Bury at Layer Road in the Fourth Division, coming on as a substitute for Perry Groves. He made six league appearances for the club and scored once in a 6–0 demolition of Hartlepool United on 3 December 1983. His final appearance came in a 1–1 draw against Wrexham on 2 January 1984.

== 2015 attack ==
In January 2015 Nichols was working for a designer clothes delivery company, and was brutally attacked. An appeal was made on BBC Crimewatch to find the attackers.
