= St. Edmundsbury Football League =

Bury & District Football League / St. Edmundsbury Football League
- Founded: 1907 (as the Bury & District Football League)
- Folded: 2019
- Country: England
- Divisions: Up to four
- Feeder to: Suffolk and Ipswich Football League
- Promotion to: Suffolk and Ipswich Football League; Division decided by SIFL Committee
- League cup(s): Mick McNeil Cup; Bill Utting Cup; Division 1 KO Cup; St Edmunds Fair Play Cup

The St. Edmundsbury Football League was a football competition based around the town of Bury St Edmunds in Suffolk, England. At various points it had up to four divisions.

The league was affiliated to the Suffolk County FA.

== History ==
The league was founded in 1907 and for most of its history has been known as the Bury & District Football League. In its early years the league had a much higher status and served a good standard of football in the West Suffolk area. However, in the last 25 years those clubs with better facilities left the league for higher standard competitions with Bacton Utd 89, Bartons, Cockfield Utd, Elmswell, Sporting 87, Stanton, St. Edmunds 65, Thurston, Walsham-le-Willows moving to the Suffolk and Ipswich Football League and Barton Mills, Exning Athletic, Lakenheath, Tuddenham Rovers and West Row Gunners moving to the Cambridgeshire League.

As a consequence there was a significant reduction in the number of divisions from three in the 1990s to two over the last decade (with the exception of 2006–07) and eventually just one division. At the same time the number of teams participating in the league has halved from around 40 teams in the 1990s to 20 teams in the 2011–12 season. The league temporarily re-added Division Three for the 2014–15 season.

In 2007 the Bury & District Football League celebrated its centenary and in the same year made the decision to rename the league as the St. Edmundsbury Football League.

Among the clubs that at one time played in the Bury & District Football League and now compete at a higher level are:

- Cambridge City (known as Cambridge Town)
- Cornard United
- Mildenhall Town
- Newmarket Town
- Sudbury Town
- Walsham-le-Willows

Many of the remaining clubs had very basic changing and pitch facilities and in later years the Division One Champions had not taken advantage of seeking promotion to the Suffolk and Ipswich League competition. This trend was broken by the 2011–12 champions Bartons, who moved to Division Three of the Suffolk and Ipswich League for the 2012–13 season. Bartons subsequently gained promotion from Division Three to the Suffolk and Ipswich League Division Two in their first season.

== Final member clubs ==
- Beck Row
- Bury Town Rams 'A'
- RF Saints
- St Edmunds 1965
- Vipers
- Walsham-le-Willows 'A'
- Walsham-le-Willows 'B'

== Divisional champions ==
Season	Division One	Division Two	Division Three
1907–08	Long Melford		
1908–09	Bury United		
1909–10	Cambridge Town		
1910–11	Cambridge Town		
1911–12	Orwell Works		
1912–13	Cambridge Town		
1913–14	n/a		
1914–15	n/a		
1915–16	n/a		
1916–17	n/a		
1917–18	n/a		
1918–19	n/a		
1919–20	Cambridge Town		
1920–21	Bury United		
1921–22	Long Melford		
1922–23	Newmarket		
1923–24	Stowmarket		
1924–25	Stowmarket		
1925–26	Sudbury Town		
1926–27	n/a		
1927–28	Newmarket Town		
1928–29	n/a		
1929–30	Thetford Town		
1930–31	Newmarket Town		
1931–32	Bury Town		
1932–33	Bury Town		
1933–34	n/a		
1934–35	n/a		
1935–36	Sudbury Town (TBC, not on trophy?)		
1936–37	n/a		
1937–38	n/a		
1938–39	n/a		
1939–40	n/a		
1940–41	n/a		
1941–42	n/a		
1942–43	n/a		
1943–44	n/a		
1944–45	n/a		
1945–46	n/a		
1946–47	Exning United		
1947–48	Exning United		
1948–49	Exning United		
1949–50	Bradfield St. Geo.		
1950–51	n/a		
1951–52	n/a		Freckenham F.C
1952–53	Bradfield St. Geo.		n/a
1953–54	Brandon Town		n/a
1954–55	Brandon Town ST.		Kennett & Kentford United
1955–56	Brandon Town ST.		Mundford F.C
1956–57	n/a		Mildenhall F.C
1957–58	n/a		n/a
1958–59	n/a		Pakenham F.C
1959–60	Elmswell		West Row F.C
1960–61	Haughley United		Fornham & Hengrave F.C
1961–62	R.A.F. Honington		Northbury Sports F.C
1962–63	Finningham		Thetford Rovers F.C
1963–64	Finningham		Bury-St-Eds YMCA F.C
1964–65	Finningham		n/a
1965–66	Finningham		Moulton F.C
1966–67	Finningham F.C.		n/a
1967–68	Finningham F.C.		Rougham F.C
1968–69	Finningham F.C.		St. Andrews F.C
1969–70	Finningham F.C.		Howards F.C
1970–71	St Edmunds R.C. F.C		Thurston F.C
1971–72	Joint Champions & Runners-Up Elmswell F.C St Edmunds R.C. F.C		Elmswell Reserves
1972–73	St Edmunds R.C. F.C		Centa F.C
1973–74	St Edmunds R.C. F.C		Springfield F.C
1974–75	St Edmunds R.C. F.C		Woolpit F.C
1975–76	St Edmunds R.C. F.C		S.N.F.C
1976–77	Centa F.C.		n/a
1977–78	St Edmunds R.C. F.C		Mundford F.C
1978–79	Centa F.C.		Rattlesden F.C
1979–80	Centa F.C.		Kingfishers F.C
1980–81	Northbury F.C.		Cockfield Utd F.C
1981–82	Northbury F.C.		Barrow Res.
1982–83	Northbury F.C.		Barber Greene
1983–84	Fornham St Martin Y.C.		Santon Downham Res. F.C
1984–85	Fornham St Martin Y.C.		Fordham St. Martin F.C
1985–86	Fornham St Martin Y.C.		Stanton F.C
1986–87	Fornham St Martin Y.C.		Kings Head F.C
1987–88	Walsham-Le-Willows		Thomas Ridley C.C. F.C
1988–89	Walsham-Le-Willows		Barrow F.C
1989–90	Stanton F.C.		Sporting 87' F.C
1990–91	Newbury United F.C.		Lakenheath 'A'
1991–92	Newbury United F.C.		Eriswell Res.
1992–93	St Edmunds R.C. F.C		Wickhambrook F.C
1993–94	Cockfield Utd. F.C		Barrow F.C
1994–95	Northbury F.C. 1995		n/a
1995–96	St Edmunds (1965) F.C.		Macebearer F.C
1996–97	n/a		Jubilee 96 F.C
1997–98	Cockfield Utd		Sicklesmere Utd F.C
1998–99	Cockfield Utd		Ixworth Raiders F.C
1999–2000	St Edmunds 65		Bartons F.C
2000–01	Macebearer		n/a
2001–02	Black Eagles F.C.		n/a
2002–03	Karooze		n/a
2003–04	Fornham St. Martin	Barons	n/a
2004–05	Black Eagles F.C.		n/a
2005–06	Black Eagles F.C.	Westbury United	n/a
2006–07	Black Eagles F.C.	Priors Inn	Elephant & Castle
2007–08	Ixworth Pykkerell F.C.	Elveden Phoenix	n/a
2008–09	Priors F.C.	Haughley United Reserves	n/a
2009–10	Ixworth Pykkerell F.C.	Elephant & Castle	n/a
2010–11	St. Edmunds 1965	Garboldisham	n/a
2011–12	Bartons F.C.	Tollgate Inn	n/a
2012–13	Home Guard FC	RF Saints	n/a
2013–14	St. Edmunds 1965 F.C.	AFC Hoxne 'A'	n/a
2014–15	Home Guard 2014	Ram Meadow	Cedars Park 'A' (TBC, not on trophy?)
2015–16	Bedricksworth F.C.	Trunk	Vipers F.C
2016–17	St Edmunds 1965 F.C.	Bury Town Rams 'B'	n/a
2017–18	St Edmunds 1965 F.C.		n/a

== Knock-Out Cup winners ==
Season	Division One K/O Cup	Division Two K/O Cup	Division Three K/O Cup	Mick McNeil Cup	Bill Utting Cup
1907–08					
1908–09					
1909–10					
1910–11					
1911–12					
1912–13					
1913–14					
1914–15					
1915–16					
1916–17					
1917–18					
1918–19					
1919–20					
1920–21					
1921–22					
1922–23					
1923–24					
1924–25					
1925–26					
1926–27					
1927–28					
1928–29					
1929–30					
1930–31					
1931–32					
1932–33					
1933–34					
1934–35					
1935–36					
1936–37					
1937–38					
1938–39					
1939–40					
1940–41					
1941–42					
1942–43					
1943–44					
1944–45					
1945–46					
1946–47					
1947–48					
1948–49					
1949–50					
1950–51					
1951–52					
1952–53					
1953–54					
1954–55					
1955–56					
1956–57					
1957–58					
1958–59					
1959–60					
1960–61					
1961–62					
1962–63					
1963–64					
1964–65					
1965–66					
1966–67					
1967–68					
1968–69					
1969–70					
1970–71					
1971–72					
1972–73					
1973–74					
1974–75					
1975–76					
1976–77					
1977–78					
1978–79				Northbury	
1979–80				Northbury	
1980–81				Elmswell	
1981–82				Elmswell	
1982–83				St Edmunds (1965)	Sicklesmere Res.
1983–84				Northbury	Santon Downham Res.
1984–85				St Edmunds (1965)	Walsham Res.
1985–86				St Edmunds (1965)	Northbury
1986–87				Sicklesmere	Stanton F.C
1987–88				Stanton	Ixworth F.C
1988–89				Walsham	Heron F.C
1989–90				Stanton	Fornham St. Marton Y C
1990–91				Thomas Ridley F.C.	Hundon F.C
1991–92			Newbury United F.C Res	Newbury Utd F.C	Hundon F.C
1992–93			Wickhambrook F.C	Bury Town 'A' F.C.	Wanderers Social F.C
1993–94			Barrow F.C	Wickhambrooke	Thomas Ridley F.C
1994–95			Tuddenham Rovers F.C	St Edmunds (1965)	Thomas Ridley F.C
1995–96			Macebearer F.C	Cockfield Utd F.C.	Tuddenham Rovers
1996–97			Fornham St. Martin	Tuddenham Rovers F.C.	Thurston F.C
1997–98			Sicklesmere Utd F.C	St Edmunds 65 F.C.	
1998–99			Jubliee 96' Res	St Edmunds 65 F.C. Res	Ixworth Raiders
1999–2000			Westbury Utd F.C	St Edmunds 65 F.C.	Barons F.C
2000–01				Black Eagles F.C.	Sicklesmere Utd
2001–02				Black Eagles F.C.	Beck Row F.C
2002–03				Fornham St Martin	Barrow 2001 F.C
2003–04				Karooze F.C.	Black Eagles F.C
2004–05				Priors Inn	Black Eagles F.C
2005–06				Black Eagles F.C.	Macebearer
2006–07			Ipswich Arms	Black Eagles F.C.	The Bushel F.C
2007–08				Priors Inn F.C.	Studlands Park F.C
2008–09				Rising Sun	The Bushel F.C
2009–10				Ixworth Pykkerell F.C.	Barons F.C
2010–11				Bushel	Beck Row F.C
2011–12				Bartons	Tollgate Inn
2012–13				St Edmunds 1965	
2013–14				Elephant & Castle	Garboldisham F.C
2014–15				Home Guard 2014	St Edmunds 1965
2015–16			Vipers F.C	St Edmunds 1965	Thurston F.C
2016–17				Vipers F.C.	Walsham B
2017–18				St Edmunds 1965	

== Thetford & District Football League Challenge Cup ==
Founded in 1905, presented by the first president G.H.Verrall, renamed 1907 Bury Junior & District Football League

Season	Winners	Captain
1905–06	Newmarket Football Club	E.Sadler captain
1906–07	Newmarket	E.Sadler captain
1907–08	Bury St Mary’s	J.M.Elliot captain
1908–09	Depôt Suffolk Regiment	D.Gooch captain
1909–10	Brandon	S.E.Day captain
1910–11	Brandon	S.E.Day captain
1911–12	Stowmarket Reserves	R.Horsley captain
1912–13	Stowmarket Reserves	S.James captain
1913–14	Stowmarket Reserves Thetford Town, Joint Holders	
1914–15	n/a	
1915–16	n/a	
1916–17	n/a	
1917–18	n/a	
1918–19	n/a	
1919–20	Boby’s Ath F.C	
1920–21	Bury North End F.C	W.W.Taylor capt
1921–22	n/a	
1922–23	Woolpit F.C	L.H.Coleby capt
1923–24	Bury Y.M.C.A	V.J.Foreman capt
1924–25	Higham F.C	R.M.Jackson capt
1925–26	n/a	
1926–27	n/a	
1927–28	Risby F.C	J.Turner capt
1928–29	411 (SUFF YEO) BTY F.C	
1929–30	n/a	
1930–31	n/a	
1931–32	Bury East End Rovers	C.Boggis capt
1932–33	n/a	
1933–34	Elmswell F.C	J.Goymer capt
1934–35	Public Service Club	P.W.Wade capt
1935–36	Mildenhall F.C	J.Powell capt
1936–37	Horringer	N.Last capt
1937–38	n/a	
1938–39	Sicklesmere	Captain W.Grimwood
1939–40	n/a	
1940–41	n/a	
1941–42	n/a	
1942–43	n/a	
1943–44	n/a	
1944–45	n/a	
1945–46	Norton F.C	Captain E.Ong
1946–47	n/a	
1947–48	n/a	
1948–49	n/a	
1949–50	n/a	
1950–51	Elmswell F.C	F.E.Nunn capt
1951–52	Bury Town A F.C	A.Smith capt
1952–53	Rougham F.C	R.Shave capt
1953–54	n/a	
1954–55	n/a	
1955–56	Rattlesden F.C	D.Sparke capt
1956–57	Felsham & Gedding	J.Boast capt
1957–58	Stanton F.C	
1958–59	Glemsford F.C	R.Davies capt
1959–60	Finningham F.C	L.Rice capt
1960–61	Hundon F.C	F.Fitch capt
1961–62	Wickhambrook	M.Deeks capt
1962–63	n/a	
1963–64	Barrow F.C	M.Parker capt
1964–65	Drinkstone Y.C	C.Seymour capt
1965–66	n/a	
1966–67	Cornard F.C	T.Murray capt
1967–68	St.Andrews	
1968–69	Fornham St Martin Y.C	R.Feakes capt
1969–70	RAF Honington	
1970–71	Santon Downham F.C	
1971–72	Merry Go-round	
1972–73	Bradford St.Geo F.C	
1973–74	Woolpit F.C	
1974–75	Gala Sports F.C	
1975–76	Beck Row	M.Bowers capt
1976–77	Bardwell Wasps	R.J.Webber capt
1977–78	Rattlesden F.C	K.Gladwell capt
1978–79	Priors Inn F.C	
1979–80	Santon Downham Res F.C	
1980–81	Barton Mills Reserves	
1981–82	West Row Gunners	
1982–83	Heron F.C	
1983–84	Tuddenham F.C	
