= Wally Hanlon =

Scottish football player (1919-1999)

Personal information
- Full name: Walter Andrew Hanlon
- Date of birth: 23 September 1919
- Place of birth: Glasgow, Scotland
- Date of death: 23 April 1999 (aged 79)
- Place of death: Poole, England
- Position: Winger

Youth career
- Clyde

Senior career*
Years	Team	Apps	(Gls)
1946–1948	Brighton & Hove Albion	72	(4)
1948–1949	Bournemouth & Boscombe Athletic	19	(3)
1949–1955	Crystal Palace	125	(8)
1955–?	Sudbury Town		
- * Club domestic league appearances and goals

Walter Andrew Hanlon (23 September 1919 – 23 April 1999) was a Scottish professional footballer who played in the Football League as a winger for Brighton & Hove Albion, Bournemouth & Boscombe Athletic and Crystal Palace. He also played non-league football for Sudbury Town.

== Playing career ==
Hanlon was born in Glasgow and began his career at Clyde. In 1946, he signed for Brighton & Hove Albion where he made 72 appearances over the next two years, scoring four goals. He then spent a season with Bournemouth & Boscombe Athletic, where he made 19 appearances, scoring three times.

In July 1949, Hanlon signed for Crystal Palace. Between then and June 1955, he made 125 League appearances for the club, scoring nine times. He then moved into non-league football with Sudbury Town.

Hanlon was granted a benefit match by Crystal Palace, which took place on 30 April 1954, against a London XI.

Hanlon died on 23 April 1999.
