= Daryl Godbold =

English footballer

Daryl Martin Godbold (born 5 September 1964, in Ipswich, Suffolk) is an English former professional footballer who played as a full-back for Norwich City and Colchester United.

== Career ==
Godbold came through the Norwich City academy before being called up to the first team in September 1982. He only made two appearances for Norwich City, both as a substitute. His debut came at home to Tottenham Hotspur in December 1983 and his other appearance was at Nottingham Forest the following January. He was transferred to Colchester United in August 1984, where he made seven appearances and scored one goal. He then finished his football career in the lower leagues of Norfolk, which included three separate spells at Wroxham between 1986 and 1992.

== Sources ==
- Canary Citizens by Mark Davage, John Eastwood, Kevin Platt, published by Jarrold Publishing, (2001), ISBN 0-7117-2020-7
