= Paul Shinners =

Footballer (born 1959)

Personal information
- Full name: Paul Shinners
- Date of birth: 8 January 1959 (age 67)
- Place of birth: Westminster, London, England
- Height: 6 ft 1 in (1.85 m)
- Position: Forward

Senior career*
Years	Team	Apps	(Gls)
- Fisher Athletic
1984–1985	Gillingham	4	(0)
1985	→ Colchester United (loan)	6	(1)
1985–1989	Leyton Orient	77	(32)
- Barnet
Total		87	(33)
- * Club domestic league appearances and goals

Paul Shinners (born 8 January 1959) is an English former footballer who played as a forward in the Football League for Gillingham, Colchester United and Leyton Orient.

== Career ==
Born in Westminster, London, Shinners began his career at Southern League club Fisher Athletic, where he hit over 200 goals and finished as the league's top scorer in the 1983–84 season, alerting Gillingham who signed Shinners in October 1984. Shinners also holds the Fisher Athletic record of most career goals for the club with 205 goals scored.

Shinners made just four appearances for Gillingham in the 1984–85 season, starting just one game. Colchester United manager Cyril Lea took Shinners on loan in March 1985, with his debut delayed until mid-April due to injury. His debut finally came on 16 April 1985 in a 1–1 away draw at Torquay United. Shinners scored one goal in six games for the U's, coming in the penultimate game of the season, a 3–2 defeat to Port Vale at Layer Road on 6 May 1985.

Shinners left Gillingham for Leyton Orient in the summer of 1985 where he was top scorer for the club in his first season with 19 goals in all competitions. Following this, he suffered numerous injuries, rounding off his stint with the O's with 32 goals in 77 league games. He then joined Conference side Barnet in January 1989, later becoming a fitness education consultant after hanging up his boots.

Shinners now runs a café and Christian bookshop in St Neots, Cambridgeshire under the umbrella of his "Passion for Souls Ministries" charity. He has made frequent trips to Africa (particularly Uganda) over the last decade as an Evangelical preacher.

He was embroiled in controversy regarding a trip to Uganda in December 2012, when Ugandan newspaper, The Daily Monitor, alleged that he had spoken in favour of the Uganda Anti-Homosexuality Act, 2014 also known as the "Kill the Gays" Bill. Shinners denied his involvement and support for the Bill, however video footage later came to light that proved he supported the death penalty for homosexuals.
