= John Winters (footballer) =

English footballer

Personal information
- Full name: John Mark Winters
- Date of birth: 24 October 1960 (age 66)
- Place of birth: Wisbech, England
- Position: Right back

Senior career*
Years	Team	Apps	(Gls)
1977–1983	Peterborough United	69	(3)
1983–1984	Nuneaton Borough	1	(0)
1984	Ramsey Town		
- Eye United
- * Club domestic league appearances and goals

John Mark Winters (born 24 October 1960) is an English former professional footballer who played in the Football League, as a right back.
