= Mike Angus =

English footballer (born 1960)

Personal information
- Full name: Michael Anthony Angus
- Date of birth: 28 October 1960
- Place of birth: Middlesbrough, England
- Position: Midfielder

Youth career
- –: Middlesbrough

Senior career*
Years	Team	Apps	(Gls)
1978–1983	Middlesbrough	37	(1)
1982–1983	→ Scunthorpe United (loan)	20	(2)
1983–1984	Southend United	0	(0)
1984–1985	Darlington	18	(7)
198?–1990	Guisborough Town		
1990–199?	South Bank		
- * Club domestic league appearances and goals

Michael Anthony Angus (born 28 October 1960) is an English former footballer who made 75 appearances in the Football League playing as a midfielder for Middlesbrough, Scunthorpe United and Darlington, whom he helped win promotion to the Third Division in 1984–85. He made a single appearance for Southend United in the League Cup, and also played non-league football for Guisborough Town and South Bank.
