= Mark Forster (footballer) =

English footballer

Personal information
- Full name: Mark Erwin Forster
- Date of birth: 1 November 1964 (age 61)
- Place of birth: Middlesbrough, England
- Position: Forward

Senior career*
Years	Team	Apps	(Gls)
	Leicester City	0	(0)
1983–1986	Darlington	38	(13)
- Guisborough Town
1987–????	South Bank		
- * Club domestic league appearances and goals

Mark Erwin Forster (born 1 November 1964) is an English former footballer who scored 13 goals from 38 appearances in the Football League playing as a forward for Darlington, and contributed to their promotion to the Third Division in 1985. He was on the books of Leicester City, but never played for them in the League, and went on to play non-league football for clubs including Guisborough Town and South Bank.
