= Paul Fishenden =

English footballer

Personal information
- Full name: Paul Fishenden
- Date of birth: 2 August 1963 (age 63)
- Place of birth: Hillingdon, England
- Height: 6 ft 0 in (1.83 m)
- Position: Forward

Senior career*
Years	Team	Apps	(Gls)
1980–1987	Wimbledon	75	(25)
1981	→ Napier City Rovers (loan)		
1982	→ Karpalo (loan)		(10)
1984–1985	→ Örebro SK (loan)	21	(11)
1986	→ Fulham (loan)	3	(0)
1986	→ Millwall (loan)	3	(0)
1987	→ Orient (loan)	4	(0)
1987–1990	Crewe Alexandra	81	(25)
1990–1991	Wokingham Town		
1992–1995	Crawley Town		
1995–1996	Harrow Borough		
- * Club domestic league appearances and goals

Paul Fishenden (born 2 August 1963) is an English former professional footballer who played in the Football League as a forward.

== Honours ==
Crewe Alexandra

- Football League Fourth Division third-place promotion winner: 1988–89
