= Wayne Ward =

English footballer

Personal information
- Full name: Wayne Walter Ward
- Date of birth: 28 April 1964 (age 62)
- Place of birth: Colchester, England
- Height: 1.74 m (5 ft 9 in)
- Position: Full back

Senior career*
Years	Team	Apps	(Gls)
1982–1983	Colchester United	19	(0)
1983–?	Tiptree United	?	(?)
- * Club domestic league appearances and goals

Wayne Ward (born 28 April 1964 in Colchester, England) is an English former footballer.

== Career ==
Ward started his career with Colchester United in May 1982. He made 22 appearances for the club in the Football League before joining non-league side Tiptree United in 1983.
