= Tony Hadley (footballer) =

English footballer

Personal information
- Full name: Antony Paul Frederick Hadley
- Date of birth: 5 July 1955 (age 71)
- Place of birth: Rochford, England
- Position: Central defender

Senior career*
Years	Team	Apps	(Gls)
?–1974	Basildon United		
1974–1983	Southend United	262	(16)
1983–1984	Colchester United	45	(0)
1984–1985	Southend United	32	(3)
1985–?	Maldon Town		
- Chelmsford City
- * Club domestic league appearances and goals

Anthony Paul Frederick Hadley (born 5 July 1955) is an English former professional footballer, who played as a central defender.

== Career ==
Born in Rochford, Hadley played for Essex Football League rivals Southend United. He also played for Colchester United amongst a variety of Essex non-league teams, during his professional career that spanned 11 years.

== Honours ==
Southend United

- Football League Fourth Division: 1980–81; runner-up: 1977–78
