= Adrian Keith =

English footballer

Personal information
- Full name: Adrian John Keith
- Date of birth: 16 December 1962 (age 63)
- Place of birth: Colchester, Essex
- Position: Defender

Youth career
- –1980: West Ham United

Senior career*
Years	Team	Apps	(Gls)
1980–1982	West Ham United	0	(0)
1983	Colchester United	4	(0)
1983–?	Haverhill Rovers		
- * Club domestic league appearances and goals as of 13:01 7 December 2011

Adrian Keith (born 16 December 1962) is an English former footballer who played as a defender for Colchester United in the Football League.

== Career ==
Keith started with West Ham United as an apprentice in their youth squad and was a member of the team which won the 1981 Youth Cup. Without making a first team appearance for West Ham he moved to Colchester United in 1983 but played only four games, all of them in January 1983. After leaving Colchester United Keith moved to non league football with Haverill Rovers.

== Honours ==
=== Club ===
West Ham United

- FA Youth Cup winner: 1980–81
