= Perry Groves =

English footballer

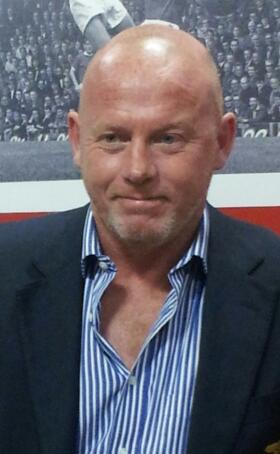
- Groves in 2014

Personal information
- Date of birth: 19 April 1965 (age 61)
- Place of birth: Bow, London, England
- Height: 5 ft 11 in (1.80 m)
- Positions: Left winger; striker

Youth career
- 1981–1982: Colchester United

Senior career*
Years	Team	Apps	(Gls)
1982–1986	Colchester United	156	(26)
1986–1992	Arsenal	156	(21)
1992–1994	Southampton	15	(2)
1994	Dagenham & Redbridge	4	(0)
1995	Canvey Island	1	(0)
Total		332	(49)
- * Club domestic league appearances and goals

Perry Groves (born 19 April 1965) is an English former professional footballer, best known for his time at Arsenal. A fast-paced player who usually played as a left winger and occasionally a striker, Groves also played professionally for Colchester United and Southampton, also briefly playing for both Dagenham & Redbridge and Canvey Island in non-league football towards the end of his career. He currently works as a media pundit.

== Playing career ==
=== Colchester United ===
Groves was born in Bow, London, but as a boy he played for Cornard Dynamos in the village of Great Cornard on the Suffolk – Essex border. Groves then had a trial with Wolves as a schoolboy before signing as an apprentice for Colchester United in 1981. He turned professional a year later and over the next four seasons he played 142 league games for the U's, scoring 26 goals.

=== Arsenal ===
In September 1986, he signed for Arsenal for £50,000, becoming the first signing by new manager George Graham. His debut came in a goalless draw against Luton Town that same month.

In his first season at the club he helped set up Charlie Nicholas for the winner in the 1987 League Cup final, dribbling past three Liverpool players before laying the ball off.

Noted for his enthusiasm, pace and hard work, he started most of Arsenal's games in the 1987–88 season, ousting Charlie Nicholas as strike partner to Alan Smith, and helping the Gunners reach a second League Cup final the following season by scoring the only goal of the away leg of the semi-final against Everton; Arsenal however lost the final to Luton Town. Although Groves made 46 appearances in all competitions that season, the arrival of Brian Marwood reduced his opportunities to play, and he was mainly used as a substitute in Arsenal's title-winning 1988–89 season, coming off the bench 15 times during the league campaign, on top of six starts. He was on the pitch as a substitute in the final game of the season and helped create the space when Michael Thomas famously scored the title clinching goal at Anfield.

Although an injury to Marwood opened the door for him again in 1989–90, Groves returned to the bench after Marwood recovered. This did not however stop him from winning a second league title winners' medal in 1990–91, again with most of his appearances coming as a sub, as Graham usually favoured Kevin Campbell to play alongside Alan Smith. After making only 13 league appearances in 1991–92, Groves was sold to Southampton just at the start of the inaugural Premier League season.

=== Southampton ===
He moved to Southampton in August 1992 for £750,000 but only played 15 times in two years before retiring from professional football at the age of 28, following two serious Achilles tendon injuries.

=== Dagenham and Redbridge ===
He then played four games in the Conference for Dagenham & Redbridge before ending his playing career with a solitary appearance for Canvey Island.

== Post-retirement ==
Groves has appeared for Arsenal in several Masters footballing tournaments. He is now a well established sports pundit and has worked for a wide variety of media firms including Sky Sports, BBC Radio 5 Live, BT Sport, Absolute Radio as well as Talksport. Groves was previously part of Absolute Radio's Sony Award winning Rock 'N' Roll Football show, fronted by former Arsenal teammate, Ian Wright, which airs on a Saturday.

In 2010, Groves signed as a non-playing substitute for new club Chester after Colin Murray, then of BBC Radio 5 Live, offered the new club £2,000 if they named Groves and Pat Nevin as unused substitutes at every game in the 2010–11 season.

== Legacy ==
Groves became a cult player among Arsenal fans, who commemorate him with the chant "We all live in a Perry Groves World", which listed Perry in every position from 1 to 12 (except 7, which is instead taken by Liam Brady), to the tune of The Beatles' "Yellow Submarine".

In October 2006, Groves published his autobiography, entitled We All Live in a Perry Groves World (ISBN 1-84454-319-6). With it came an Arsenal fans' campaign on the web to purchase the book, in an attempt to outsell former Arsenal defender Ashley Cole's autobiography, My Defence, which was out at the same time.

== Family ==
His great uncle, Vic Groves, having previously featured for Tottenham Hotspur, played for and captained Arsenal. He played as a forward making 203 appearances and scoring 37 goals.

== Career statistics ==
Appearances and goals by club, season and competition
Club	Season	League			FA Cup		League Cup		Other		Total	
Club	Season	Division	Apps	Goals	Apps	Goals	Apps	Goals	Apps	Goals	Apps	Goals
Colchester United
Colchester United	1981–82	Fourth Division	9	0	0	0	0	0	—		9	0
Colchester United	1982–83	Fourth Division	17	2	0	0	2	1	3 (Note: Appearances in Group Cup)	0	22	3
Colchester United	1983–84	Fourth Division	42	2	2	0	5	0	1 (Note: Appearances in Associate Members' Cup)	0	50	2
Colchester United	1984–85	Fourth Division	44	10	3	1	2	0	3	1	52	12
Colchester United	1985–86	Fourth Division	43	12	1	0	1	0	2	3	47	15
Colchester United	1986–87	Fourth Division	1	0	0	0	0	0	—		1	0
Colchester United	Total		156	26	6	1	10	1	9	4	181	32
Arsenal
Arsenal	1986–87	First Division	25	3	3	0	6	0	—		34	3
Arsenal	1987–88	First Division	34	6	4	1	8	2	—		46	9
Arsenal	1988–89	First Division	21	4	2	0	2	0	2 (Note: Appearances in Centenary Trophy)	1	27	5
Arsenal	1989–90	First Division	30	4	3	0	3	1	—		36	5
Arsenal	1990–91	First Division	32	3	4	0	4	3	—		40	6
Arsenal	1991–92	First Division	13	1	1	0	3	0	4 (Note: Appearances in European Cup)	0	21	1
Arsenal	1992–93	Premier League	1	0	0	0	0	0	—		1	0
Arsenal	Total		156	21	17	1	26	6	6	1	205	29
Southampton	1992–93	Premier League	15	2	1	0	2	0	—		18	2
Career total			327	49	24	2	38	7	15	5	404	63

== Honours ==
Arsenal

- Football League First Division: 1988–89, 1990–91
- Football League Cup: 1986–87; runner-up: 1987–88
- Football League Centenary Trophy: 1988
