= Ian Phillips (footballer) =

Scottish footballer

Personal information
- Full name: Ian Alexander Phillips
- Date of birth: 23 April 1959 (age 67)
- Place of birth: Cumnock, Scotland
- Height: 5 ft 9 in (1.75 m)
- Position: Fullback

Youth career
- Ipswich Town

Senior career*
Years	Team	Apps	(Gls)
1977–1979	Mansfield Town	23	(0)
1979–1982	Peterborough United	97	(3)
1982–1983	Northampton Town	42	(1)
1983–1987	Colchester United	150	(10)
1987–1990	Aldershot	106	(2)
1990–1991	Kettering Town	?	(?)
1991–1992	Colchester United	4	(0)
1992–1996	Halstead Town	?	(?)

Managerial career
- 1995–1996: Halstead Town
- * Club domestic league appearances and goals as of 14:31, 16 May 2011

Ian Alexander Phillips (born 23 April 1959) is a Scottish former professional footballer who played as a fullback in the Football League for Mansfield Town, Peterborough United, Northampton Town, Colchester United in two spells and Aldershot. He left Colchester after his second spell to become player-manager of Halstead Town. In 1999, he was approached by Clacton Town to take over as their manager, but he declined.
