= Dave Hubbick =

English footballer (born 1960)

Personal information
- Full name: David Hubbick
- Date of birth: 16 March 1960 (age 66)
- Place of birth: South Shields, England
- Height: 5 ft 7 in (1.70 m)
- Position: Forward

Youth career
- 1976–1978: Ipswich Town

Senior career*
Years	Team	Apps	(Gls)
1978–1980	Ipswich Town	0	(0)
1980–1982	Wimbledon	26	(6)
- Gravesend & Northfleet
–1983	Dagenham		
1983–1985	Colchester United	15	(1)
- Sudbury Town
1990–1991	Cornard United		
1997–1998	Woodbridge Town		

Managerial career
- 1997–2003: Woodbridge Town
- 2006–2008: Stowmarket Town
- * Club domestic league appearances and goals

David Hubbick (born 16 March 1960) is an English former professional footballer who played in the Football League for Wimbledon and Colchester United.

== Career ==
Born in South Shields, Hubbick started his career at Ipswich Town. He began playing in the reserves in the 1976–77 season, making his reserve debut on 21 April 1977 as a substitute in a 3–1 defeat at Bristol City reserve. He signed a contract at the club in January 1978 and although he became a regular in the reserves, he never made a first team appearance. He signed for Wimbledon for £5,000 in September 1980, where he played 26 games for the club, before dropping into non-League with Gravesend & Northfleet in 1982.

After a spell with Dagenham, he returned to professional football with Colchester United in 1983. However, he made only 15 appearances for the club, and signed for Sudbury Town in 1985. Whilst at Sudbury he played at Wembley Stadium in the 1989 FA Vase final, scoring Sudbury's goal in a 1–1 draw, and was named man of the match. He later played for Cornard United and Woodbridge Town, who he managed between 1997 and 2003. He went on to manage Stowmarket Town, before resigning in January 2008.

== Honours ==
Sudbury Town

- FA Vase runner-up: 1988–89
