= Les Mutrie =

English footballer (1951–2017)

Personal information
- Full name: Leslie Alan Mutrie
- Date of birth: 1 April 1951
- Place of birth: Newcastle upon Tyne, England
- Date of death: 3 October 2017 (aged 66)
- Place of death: Dudley, Newcastle upon Tyne, England
- Position: Striker

Senior career*
| Years | Team | Apps | (Gls) |
| ?–1977 | Gateshead United | ? | (?) |
| 1977–1978 | Carlisle United | 5 | (0) |
| 1978 | Gateshead | ? | (4) |
| 1978–1980 | Blyth Spartans | 86 | (58) |
| 1980–1984 | Hull City | 115 | (49) |
| 1983–1984 | → Doncaster Rovers (loan) | 6 | (1) |
| 1984 | Colchester United | 14 | (2) |
| 1984–1985 | Hartlepool United | 18 | (4) |
| 1985–? | Dudley Welfare | ? | (?) |
| Total | | 244 | (116) |

International career
| 1979–1980 | England semi-pro | 5 | (2) |

Managerial career
- 1985–?: Dudley Welfare
- * Club domestic league appearances and goals

Leslie Alan Mutrie (1 April 1951 – 3 October 2017) was an English footballer who played as a striker in The Football League.

== Career ==
Born in Newcastle upon Tyne, Mutrie played for Gateshead, Carlisle United, Blyth Spartans, Hull City, Doncaster Rovers, Colchester United, Hartlepool United and Dudley Welfare between 1977 and 1985.

== Honours ==
=== Club ===
Hull City

- Football League Fourth Division Runner-up (1): 1982–83

=== Individual ===
- PFA Team of the Year (1): 1982–83
