= Phil Coleman (footballer) =

English footballer

Personal information
- Full name: Phillip Coleman
- Date of birth: 8 September 1960 (age 66)
- Place of birth: Woolwich, England
- Height: 5 ft 11 in (1.80 m)
- Position: Defender

Youth career
- 1976–1979: Millwall

Senior career*
Years	Team	Apps	(Gls)
1978–1981	Millwall	36	(1)
1981–1984	Colchester United	119	(6)
1983–1984	→ Wrexham (loan)	21	(4)
1984	Chelmsford City	11	(0)
1984–1985	Exeter City	6	(0)
1985–1986	Aldershot	46	(5)
1986	Dulwich Hamlet	8	(2)
1986–1988	Millwall	11	(0)
1988	Myllykosken Pallo −47	20	(0)
1988–1989	Colchester United	10	(0)
1989–1995	Wivenhoe Town	211	(53)
1997	Wivenhoe Town	0	(0)

Managerial career
- 1991: Wivenhoe Town
- * Club domestic league appearances and goals

Phillip Coleman (born 8 September 1960) is an English footballer who played as a defender in the Football League.

== Career ==
Attended Roan Grammar School, Blackheath winning the English Schools FA cup in 1977, aged 16, scoring in a 4–1 victory. He began his career in the youth ranks of Millwall, where he played as a defender and midfielder, notably scoring one of two Millwall goals in the 1979 FA Youth Cup Final win against Manchester City.

He made his first senior appearance for Millwall in a 2–1 win v West Ham aged 18, turning professional in August 1978. In 1981 Colchester United manager Bobby Roberts signed Coleman from Millwall for a fee of £15,000.

He went on to play for Wrexham, Exeter, Aldershot before returning to Millwall for a second spell playing alongside his brother Nick in a division two winning team. A season playing in Finland before returning for a second spell at Colchester United under manager Jock Wallace.

== Personal life ==
After retiring from playing Coleman trained to be a PE teacher, receiving a BA Honours degree in Sport and Education from Middlesex University. He also served as a player then player/manager for Wivenhoe Town and has also coached at Colchester United's youth academy, and non league clubs Clacton, Heybridge and Braintree.

Coleman retired as a PE teacher after 33 years having taught at The Gilberd School, The Colne Community School and finally at Philip Morant and Sigma Sixth Sports Academy.

After 7 years as a City Councillor he left in May 2023.

His son, Liam Coleman, also played professional football.
