= Jeff Hull (footballer) =

English footballer

Personal information
- Full name: Jeffrey Hull
- Date of birth: 25 August 1960 (age 66)
- Place of birth: Rochford, England
- Position: Midfielder

Senior career*
Years	Team	Apps	(Gls)
1978–1981	Southend United	15	(1)
1981–1982	Basildon United	?	(?)
1982–1986	Colchester United	83	(10)
- * Club domestic league appearances and goals as of 18:06, 13 May 2011

Jeffrey Hull (born 25 August 1960 in Rochford, England) is an English former professional footballer who played as a midfielder for football league clubs Southend United and Essex rivals Colchester United. He retired from the professional game in 1985 through injury.
