= Sudbury Town F.C. =

Sudbury Town
- Full name: Sudbury Town Football Club
- Nickname: The Borough
- Founded: 1885
- Dissolved: 1999
- Ground: Priory Stadium, Sudbury
Home colours

Sudbury Town Football Club was a football club based in Sudbury, Suffolk, England. Established in 1885, the club merged with Sudbury Wanderers in 1999 to form A.F.C. Sudbury.

== History ==
=== Early days ===
Sudbury F.C. were in existence in 1884 but were not officially established until 1885, when they were founder members of the Suffolk FA in the same year. In 1894 they joined the West Suffolk League and won it in 1896–97. In 1898, they joined the Essex & Suffolk Border League. In 1900 they merged with Sudbury Wanderers to form Sudbury United. In 1903 they also joined the Haverhill & District League, winning it in 1905–06. At the end of that season they left the West Suffolk League and instead entered a team into the South East Anglian League. In 1908 they were renamed Sudbury Town and entered a team into a third league, the Colchester & District League, for the 1908–09 season. In 1909 they left all three leagues and rejoined the West Suffolk League and the Bury & District League, winning the West Suffolk League again in 1910–11. In 1912 they left both leagues and rejoined the East Anglian League (as the South East Anglian League had become) and the Essex & Suffolk Border League (as the Colchester & District League had become).

=== 1930s ===
After World War I the club again entered teams to several leagues, playing in the Haverhill & District League from 1919 until 1922 and again from 1928 until 1933, winning it in 1930–31 and 1931–32. They also rejoined the Bury & District League in 1919, leaving in 1921, rejoining in 1923 and leaving in 1928, before a third inter-war spell from 1933 until 1938. They were champions in 1925–26 and 1935–36. In 1921 they joined the Ipswich & District League for the first time, but left in 1923. They rejoined in 1931, were champions in 1934–35, and left in 1936. In 1922 the club rejoined the Essex & Suffolk Border League, which they played in until 1931, and then rejoined in 1936. They won its Knockout Cup in 1938–39. The club lost three Suffolk Senior Cup finals between 1930 and 1937. During the 1930s, the club's headquarters were at the Black Boy pub on Market Hill, with opposition players using it as a changing room.

=== 1950s ===
Following World War II the club joined the Haverhill & District League and the Essex & Suffolk Border League, but left the former after a single season. They appointed player-manager Pat Kearney and won the Border League in 1948–49 and again in 1949–50 when they also won the Knockout Cup. Charlie Hurst, father of Geoff, was player-manager in early 1950s. In 1951 they applied to join the Eastern Counties League, but were unsuccessful. They won the league for the next three seasons and each time applied again to the ECL, but were unsuccessful on each occasion. In 1951-52 they also reached the fourth qualifying round of the FA Cup, losing to King's Lynn. In 1952–53 they moved to Priory Stadium and also won the Suffolk & Ipswich League (as the Ipswich & District League was now known). They also reached three Suffolk Senior Cup finals in four years between 1951 and 1954 but lost them all, losing to Stowmarket Town and then twice to Long Melford. In 1954–55, they again reached the fourth qualifying round of the FA Cup, losing at home to one of the best amateur teams of the era, Walthamstow Avenue and despite only finishing fifth in the league, a fifth application at the end of the season saw the club eventually win admission to the Eastern Counties League, defeating Holbeach United by a single vote.

=== Eastern Counties League ===
In 1955–56, they appointed former Crystal Palace winger Wally Hanlon as manager and finished sixth in the new division and again reached the fourth qualifying round of the FA Cup, losing to Southall. In 1956–57, after six defeats in the final, they finally won the Suffolk Senior Cup, beating Bury Town 3–1 in front of a crowd of 12,000 at Portman Road in Ipswich. Again, they reached the fourth qualifying round of the FA Cup, losing this time to Ely. In 1959–60, Jimmy Chalmers was appointed player-manager and he was replaced in the 1965–66 season by Edgar Rumney. The following year, they finished runners-up in the league. Former Ipswich Town player, Jimmy Leadbetter, took over in 1968 and kept the club in the top six for four seasons. In 1969–70 they won the League Cup but lost the Suffolk Premier Cup final, losing 6–1 to Ipswich Town. They lost the Suffolk Premier Cup final the following year too but in 1972–73 they won it for the first time under manager Bill Wilkie, beating Bury Town 4–0. The following season under Paul Smith as player-manager, they won the Eastern Counties League for the first time, as well as retaining the Premier Cup. The following season they won the league again, and retained it in 1975–76, when they also won the Premier Cup again. The club won the Premier Cup again in 1981, 1982, 1983 and 1985, before winning back-to-back league titles in 1985–86 and 1986–87 and again in 1988–89 and 1989–90, also winning the Premier Cup every year between 1987 and 1990.

=== FA Vase ===
In 1984–85, under manager Malcolm MacKenzie, they took part in the FA Vase for the first time and reached the sixth round after beating former champions VS Rugby after four games in the fourth round. Their run ended with a 1–0 defeat away to Exmouth Town. They reached the fifth round in 1985-86 and in 1987–88, under new management duo Don James and Martin Head, they reached the semi-finals for the first time, losing to eventual winners, Colne Dynamoes. The following year they only conceded one goal on the way to the 1989 FA Vase Final and in the second leg of the semi-final against Hungerford Town, a record crowd for a competitive game at Priory Stadium saw Sudbury win 6–0 to reach Wembley. The final against Tamworth set a new record attendance for an FA Vase Final of 26,478, beating the previous record by more than 8,000; with around 2,500 more Sudbury fans at the game than Tamworth supporters. After a 1–1 draw in the first match, Tamworth won the replay 3–0 at Peterborough United's London Road Stadium.

=== Merger ===
In 1990 the club joined the Division One South of the Southern League. After winning the Premier Cup in 1992 and 1993, in 1993–94 they were promoted to the Premier Division having finished as runners-up, as well as winning the League Cup. Under the leadership of former Arsenal player Richie Powling, the club finished tenth in 1995–96 and reached the first round proper of the FA Cup in 1996–97 for the first ever time, beating Football League club Brighton & Hove Albion on penalties in the first round replay, before losing 3–1 to Brentford in the second round in a game played at Layer Road in Colchester. However, they dropped back to the Eastern Counties League in 1997, due to financial difficulties. As a result of the problems, the club merged with neighbouring Sudbury Wanderers on 1 June 1999 to form AFC Sudbury, with the new club playing at Wanderers' Brundon Lane ground.

== Ground ==
The club initially played in Belle Vue Park before moving to Friars Street in 1891, a ground shared with the local cricket club. However, this arrangement was felt to be holding the club back, and in 1951 a limited company was formed to purchase a nearby water meadow for conversion to a new ground that became the Priory Stadium. The site was raised several feet in an attempt to prevent further flooding, although it was not entirely successful. The wooden grandstand from Friars Street was disassembled and moved to the new ground. The club began the 1952–53 season at the new ground, with the first match of the season being a 6–0 win over Clacton Town reserves on 6 September.

A record attendance was set at the first final of the Suffolk Premier Cup in 1959, which had become the county's top competition, with 3,712 watching Bury Town beat Long Melford.

The record attendance for the ground of 4,700 was set on 11 May 1978 in a testimonial match against Ipswich Town just five days after Ipswich had won the FA Cup. The record may have been beaten by the FA Vase semi-final against Hungerford Town, for which the official attendance was 4,320, but unable to cope with the number of people attending the match, the club had simply opened the gates and allowed everyone in.

Plans were made to relocate to a new ground, the Brooklands Stadium, in Great Cornard during the late 1980s, but failed to come to fruition.

== Honours ==
- Southern League
  - League Cup winners 1993–94
- Eastern Counties League
  - Champions 1973–74, 1974–75, 1975–76, 1985–86, 1986–87, 1988–89, 1989–90
  - League Cup winners 1969–70, 1976–77, 1982–83, 1986–87, 1988–89, 1989–90
- Suffolk & Ipswich League
  - Champions 1934–35, 1952–53
- Essex & Suffolk Border League
  - Champions 1948–49, 1949–50, 1951–52, 1952–53, 1953–547
  - Knockout Cup winners 1938–39, 1949–50
- West Suffolk League
  - Champions 1896–97, 1910–11
- Haverhill & District League
  - Champions 1905–06, 1930–31, 1931–32
- Bury & District League
  - Champions 1925–26, 1935–36
- Suffolk Premier Cup
  - Winners 1972–73, 1973–74, 1975–76, 1980–81, 1981–82, 1982–83, 1984–85, 1986–87, 1987–88, 1988–89, 1989–90, 1991–92, 1992–93
- Suffolk Senior Cup
  - Winners 1956–57
- East Anglian Cup
  - Winners 1985–86 (Cup retained 1986-87 although final not played)

== Records ==
- FA Vase best performance: Runners-up 1988–89
- FA Trophy best performance: Third round 1995–96
- FA Cup best performance: Second round 1996–97

== Notable players ==
Several former professional players played for Sudbury Town, including;

- Steve Ball
- Ian Brown
- Michael Cheetham
- Tony English
- Dave Hubbick
- Bryan Klug
- Jimmy Leadbetter
- Christian McClean
- Steve McGavin
- Roger Osborne
- Russell Osman
- Nicky Smith
- Clive Stafford
- John Taylor
- Brian Talbot
- Ray Warne

== Managers ==
Manager	From	To
Pat Kearney	1948	1950
Charlie Hurst	1950	1951
Wally Hanlon	1955	1959
Jimmy Chalmers	1959	1965
Edgar Rumney	1965	1968
Jimmy Leadbetter	1968	1971
Bill Wilkie	1971	1973
Peter Smith	1973	1978
Malcolm MacKenzie		1987
Don James and Martin Head	1987	
Richie Powling	1992	1997
Paul Grimsey	1997	1999

== See also ==
- Sudbury Town F.C. players
