= 1989–90 Colchester United F.C. season =

Colchester United
1989–90 season
- Chairman: Jonathan Crisp
- Manager: Jock Wallace (until 20 December); Steve Foley (caretaker) (20 December until 2 January); Mick Mills (from 3 January)
- Stadium: Layer Road
- Fourth Division: 24th (relegated)
- FA Cup: 2nd round (eliminated by Birmingham City)
- League Cup: 1st round (eliminated by Southend United)
- Associate Members' Cup: Preliminary round (southern section)
- Top goalscorer: League: Trevor Morgan (12); All: Trevor Morgan (12)
- Highest home attendance: 5,283 v Southend United, 16 April 1990
- Lowest home attendance: 1,720 v Torquay United, 16 December 1989
- Average home league attendance: 3,139
- Biggest win: 4–0 v Carlisle United, 6 March 1990
- Biggest defeat: 0–4 v Aldershot, 7 October 1989 v Scunthorpe United, 21 October 1989 v Cambridge United, 29 April 1990
Home colours

The 1989–90 season was Colchester United's 48th season in their history and ninth consecutive season in fourth tier of English football, the Fourth Division. Alongside competing in the Fourth Division, the club also participated in the FA Cup, the League Cup and the Associate Members' Cup.

Initially looking to build on manager Jock Wallace's influence towards the end of the 1988–89 season after five consecutive wins and unbeaten in eight, Colchester had a dreadful start to the new campaign, not registering a win until late September and then no further league wins until Boxing Day. By this time, Wallace had stepped aside from his role due to ill health, and after another caretaker spell for Steve Foley, Mick Mills was tasked with keeping Colchester in the Football League. Aside from a four match unbeaten run in February and early March, Mills ultimately failed as the U's finished bottom of the entire Football League and relegated to the Conference.

Only one win was registered in the cups, with a 1–0 FA Cup first round win over Brentford the only highlight prior to elimination by Birmingham City in the second round. Southend United won an Essex derby League Cup first round over two legs, and the U's failed to reach the knockout phase of the Associate Members' Cup.

== Season overview ==
Jock Wallace began his first full season in charge with a winless run stretching eight games at the start of the season, and only two league wins were registered before the turn of the decade. Assistant manager Alan Ball left the club to join Stoke City and ahead of Christmas, Wallace stepped aside due to ill health and the onset of Parkinson's disease. Steve Foley was once again placed in temporary charge of the U's first team but declined the offer of the role full-time instead preferring his youth team duties. Chairman Jonathan Crisp brought in former Ipswich Town and England defender Mick Mills as the new manager having recently been dismissed by Stoke City.

Mills' appointment initially had a positive effect on the team, and they won three and drew one of four league games in late February and early March, but a defeat at nearest rivals Wrexham in late March, after twice leading before succumbing to a 3–2 defeat, summed up the remainder of the season. Despite having enough time to potentially improve their situation, six defeats in the final eight games of the season left Colchester bottom of the Fourth Division and so relegated to the Conference.

By now, the club was over £1m in debt, and plans for a new stadium at Wick Lane, Ardleigh had also been refused. Jonathan Crisp's initial hope of achieving Second Division football within five years of his appointment in 1985 now seemed very distant with the club out of the Football League for the first time in 40 years.

== Players ==
As of match played 5 May 1990.

Name	Position	Nationality	Place of birth	Date of birth	Apps	Goals	Signed from	Date signed	Fee
Defenders
Marcelle Bruce	FB	(United States)	Detroit	15 March 1971 (aged 18)	0	0	Apprentice	Summer 1989	Free transfer
Scott Daniels	CB	(England)	South Benfleet	22 November 1969 (aged 19)	35	0	Apprentice	23 April 1988 (Note: Date of signing refers to the date of the player's first game for the club)	Free transfer
Tony English	DF/MF	(England)	Luton	19 October 1966 (aged 22)	211	31	(England) Coventry City	24 December 1984	Free transfer
Billy Gilbert	CB	(England)	Lewisham	10 November 1959 (aged 29)	0	0	(England) Portsmouth	October 1989	Free transfer
Martin Grainger	FB	(England)	Enfield Town	23 August 1972 (aged 16)	0	0	Apprentice	16 December 1989	Free transfer
Neale Marmon	CB	(England)	Bournemouth	21 April 1961 (aged 28)	0	0	(Germany) Hannover 96	20 January 1990	Nominal
John Pollard	CB	(England)	Chelmsford	17 November 1971 (aged 17)	2	1	Apprentice	5 May 1989	Free transfer
Clive Stafford	FB	(England)	Ipswich	4 April 1963 (aged 26)	16	0	(England) Diss Town	February 1989	Unknown
Midfielders
Eamonn Collins	MF	(Republic of Ireland)	Dublin	22 October 1965 (aged 23)	0	0	(England) Portsmouth	May 1989	Free transfer
Robbie Devereux	MF	(England)	Great Cornard	31 January 1971 (aged 18)	0	0	(England) Ipswich Town	Summer 1989	Free transfer
Mark Kinsella	MF	(Republic of Ireland)	Dublin	12 August 1972 (aged 16)	0	0	(Republic of Ireland) Home Farm	18 August 1989	Free transfer
Mark Radford	MF	(England)	Leicester	20 December 1968 (aged 20)	52	1	Apprentice	26 January 1987	Free transfer
Les Taylor	MF	(England)	North Shields	4 December 1956 (aged 32)	16	0	(England) Reading	January 1989	£20,000
Forwards
Gary Bennett	WG	(England)	Enfield Town	13 November 1970 (aged 18)	9	1	(England) Tottenham Hotpsur	21 October 1988	Free transfer
Trevor Morgan	FW	(England)	Forest Gate	30 September 1956 (aged 32)	0	0	(England) Bolton Wanderers	October 1989	£8,000
Steve Restarick	FW	(England)	Barking	28 November 1971 (aged 17)	0	0	(England) West Ham United	Early 1988–89 season	Free transfer

== Transfers ==
=== In ===
Date	Position	Nationality	Name	From	Fee	Ref.
Summer 1989	FB	(United States)	Marcelle Bruce	Apprentice	Free transfer	
Summer 1989	MF	(England)	Robbie Devereux	(England) Ipswich Town	Free transfer	
Summer 1989	GK	(Republic of Ireland)	John Grace	(Republic of Ireland) Tolka Rovers	Undisclosed	
May 1989	MF	(Republic of Ireland)	Eamonn Collins	(England) Portsmouth	Free transfer	
18 August 1989	MF	(Republic of Ireland)	Mark Kinsella	(Republic of Ireland) Home Farm	Free transfer	
October 1989	CB	(England)	Billy Gilbert	(England) Portsmouth	Free transfer	
October 1989	FW	(England)	Trevor Morgan	(England) Bolton Wanderers	£8,000	
21 October 1989	FW	(England)	Tommy English	(England) Bishop's Stortford	Undisclosed	(Note: Date of signing refers to the date of the player's first game in his third spell for the club)
2 December 1989	DF	(Northern Ireland)	Jim Hagan	(Spain) Celta Vigo	Free transfer	(Note: Date of signing refers to the date of the player's first game for the club)
16 December 1989	FB	(England)	Martin Grainger	Apprentice	Free transfer	
26 December 1989	FW	(England)	John Warner	(England) Heybridge Swifts	Free transfer	(Note: Date of signing refers to the date of the player's first game in his second spell for the club)
29 December 1989	MF	(England)	Steve Ball	(England) Arsenal	Non-contract	
20 January 1990	CB	(England)	Neale Marmon	(Germany) Hannover 96	Nominal	

- Total spending: ▼ ~ £8,000

=== Out ===
Date	Position	Nationality	Name	To	Fee	Ref.
End of season	FB	(England)	Phil Coleman	(England) Wivenhoe Town	Released	
End of season	FW	(England)	Mario Walsh	(England) Southend United	£25,000	
Summer 1989	CB	(England)	Stuart Hicks	(England) Scunthorpe United	Free transfer	
Summer 1989	GK	(Wales)	Mark Walton	(England) Norwich City	£75,000	
August 1989	CB	(Northern Ireland)	Colin Hill	(England) Sheffield United	£85,000	
December 1989	WG	(England)	Ian Allinson	(England) Baldock Town	Released	
16 December 1989	DF	(Northern Ireland)	Jim Hagan	(Sweden) IK Oddevold	Released	(Note: Date of departure refers to the date of the player's final game for the club)
January 1990	FB	(England)	Rodney Rooke	(England) Wivenhoe Town	Released	
5 January 1990	GK	(Republic of Ireland)	John Grace	(Republic of Ireland) Kilkenny City	Released	
5 January 1990	FW	(England)	John Warner	(England) Dagenham	Free transfer	
27 January 1990	MF	(England)	Steve Ball	(England) Norwich City	Free transfer	
10 April 1990	FW	(England)	Tommy English	(Hong Kong) Happy Valley	Undisclosed	
29 April 1990	FB	(Scotland)	Robert Scott	(Scotland) East Fife	Free transfer	
5 May 1990	MF/DF	(England)	Richard Wilkins	(England) Cambridge United	£65,000	

- Total incoming: ▲ ~ £250,000

=== Loans in ===
Date	Position	Nationality	Name	From	End date	Ref.
August 1989	GK	(England)	Roger Hansbury	(England) Birmingham City	16 September 1989	(Note: Loan end date refers to the date of the player's final game for the club)
5 September 1989	CB	(England)	Mark Blake	(England) Southampton	26 September 1989	
January 1990	FB	(England)	Karl Goddard	(England) Bradford City	24 April 1990	
12 January 1990	GK	(England)	Scott Barrett	(England) Stoke City	17 March 1990	(Note: Loan start and end dates refer to the date of the player's first and final games for the club)
March 1990	GK	(Wales)	Andy Marriott	(England) Nottingham Forest	5 May 1990	

=== Loans out ===
Date	Position	Nationality	Name	To	End date	Ref.
February 1990	FB	(England)	Clive Stafford	(England) Exeter City	February 1990	

== Match details ==
=== Fourth Division ===
==== Results round by round ====
Round	1	2	3	4	5	6	7	8	9	10	11	12	13	14	15	16	17	18	19	20	21	22	23	24	25	26	27	28	29	30	31	32	33	34	35	36	37	38	39	40	41	42	43	44	45	46
Ground	A	H	A	H	A	H	H	A	A	H	H	A	H	A	A	H	A	H	H	A	A	H	H	A	H	A	A	H	A	H	H	A	H	A	A	H	A	H	A	H	A	H	A	H	A	H
Result	D	D	L	D	D	D	W	L	L	L	L	L	L	L	D	L	D	L	L	W	L	W	L	D	W	L	D	L	L	W	W	D	W	L	L	W	L	W	L	L	W	L	L	W	L	L
Position	11	13	19	17	19	20	15	16	18	20	22	23	23	23	23	23	23	23	23	23	24	23	23	23	22	22	22	23	24	23	22	23	22	23	24	24	24	24	24	24	24	24	24	24	24	24

Source: 11v11.com
A = Away; H = Home; W = Win; D = Draw; L = Loss

==== League table ====
Pos	Team	Pld	W	D	L	GF	GA	GD	Pts	Promotion or relegation
20	Doncaster Rovers	46	14	9	23	53	60	−7	51	
21	Wrexham	46	13	12	21	51	67	−16	51	Qualification for the European Cup Winners' Cup first round (Note: Wrexham were runners-up in the Welsh Cup final, and since winners Hereford United are an English club, Wrexham were awarded the right to participate in the Cup Winners' Cup.)
22	Aldershot	46	12	14	20	49	69	−20	50	
23	Halifax Town	46	12	13	21	57	65	−8	49	
24	Colchester United (R)	46	11	10	25	48	75	−27	43	Relegation to the Football Conference

(R) Relegated

==== Matches ====
19 August 1989 1	Chesterfield	1–1	Colchester United	Chesterfield
	Thompson 38'	Report	Radford 9'	Stadium: Saltergate; Attendance: 3,161; Referee: A Smith

26 August 1989 2	Colchester United	2–2	Halifax Town	Colchester
15:00 BST	Bennett 64'; Radford 90' (pen.)	Report	Hicks 51' (o.g.); Watson 69'	Stadium: Layer Road; Attendance: 2,404; Referee: R Pawley

2 September 1989 3	Grimsby Town	4–1	Colchester United	Cleethorpes
	Rees 11', 75'; Watson 45'; Daniels 59' (o.g.)	Report	Allinson 48'	Stadium: Blundell Park; Attendance: 4,678; Referee: J Kirkby

8 September 1989 4	Colchester United	1–1	Hereford United	Colchester
19:30 BST	Allinson 35' (pen.)	Report	Pejic 90'	Stadium: Layer Road; Attendance: 3,269; Referee: Peter Jones

16 September 1989 5	Rochdale	2–2	Colchester United	Rochdale
	Whellans 25'; Walling 66'	Report	Collins 23'; Blake 68'	Stadium: Spotland Stadium; Attendance: 1,466; Referee: A Dawson

23 September 1989 6	Colchester United	0–0	Scarborough	Colchester
15:00 BST		Report		Stadium: Layer Road; Attendance: 2,420; Referee: R Bigger

26 September 1989 7	Colchester United	4–1	Maidstone United	Colchester
	Radford 2'; Allinson 57' (pen.); Taylor 64'; Bennett 69'	Report	Cooper 70' (pen.)	Stadium: Layer Road; Attendance: 2,946; Referee: Kelvin Morton

30 September 1989 8	Carlisle United	1–0	Colchester United	Carlisle
	Fyfe 17'	Report		Stadium: Brunton Park; Attendance: 3,979; Referee: P Harrison

7 October 1989 9	Aldershot	4–0	Colchester United	Aldershot
	Puckett 6', 17' (pen.); Wignall 77'; Burvill 90'	Report		Stadium: Recreation Ground; Attendance: 2,092; Referee: G Pooley

13 October 1989 10	Colchester United	0–2	York City	Colchester
19:30 BST		Report	Himsworth 8', 28'	Stadium: Layer Road; Attendance: 3,274; Referee: M James

17 October 1989 11	Colchester United	1–3	Wrexham	Colchester
19:30 BST	Scott 33'	Report	Reck 3'; Worthington 53' (pen.), 79'	Stadium: Layer Road; Attendance: 2,564; Referee: Alf Buksh

21 October 1989 12	Scunthorpe United	4–0	Colchester United	Scunthorpe
	Stevenson 20'; Daws 41'; Hamilton 63'; Taylor 88'	Report		Stadium: Glanford Park; Attendance: 3,254; Referee: Paul Danson

28 October 1989 13	Colchester United	0–1	Peterborough United	Colchester
		Report	Osborne 88'	Stadium: Layer Road; Attendance: 3,460; Referee: J Carter

1 November 1989 14	Exeter City	2–1	Colchester United	Exeter
	Neville 39', 79'	Report	Tony English 30'	Stadium: St James Park; Attendance: 3,905; Referee: J Martin

4 November 1989 15	Burnley	0–0	Colchester United	Burnley
15:00 GMT		Report		Stadium: Turf Moor; Attendance: 6,145; Referee: Stephen Lodge

10 November 1989 16	Colchester United	1–2	Cambridge United	Colchester
19:30 GMT	Tommy English 32' (pen.)	Report	Dennis 36'; Dublin 74'	Stadium: Layer Road; Attendance: 3,771; Referee: R Wiseman

24 November 1989 17	Gillingham	3–3	Colchester United	Gillingham
	Heritage 15'; Lovell 26' (pen.); O'Shea 87'	Report	Tommy English 50' (pen.); Bennett 56'; Morgan 63'	Stadium: Priestfield Stadium; Attendance: 3,816; Referee: M Bailey

2 December 1989 18	Colchester United	0–1	Lincoln City	Colchester
15:00 GMT	Collins (red card) 74'	Report	Nicholson 29'	Stadium: Layer Road; Attendance: 2,517; Referee: M Pierce

16 December 1989 19	Colchester United	0–3	Torquay United	Colchester
15:00 GMT		Report	Loram 26'; Caldwell 71'; Smith 87'	Stadium: Layer Road; Attendance: 1,720; Referee: Paul Alcock

26 December 1989 20	Southend United	0–2	Colchester United	Southend-on-Sea
		Report	Grainger 65'; Tommy English 69'	Stadium: Roots Hall; Attendance: 5,563; Referee: Rob Lewis

30 December 1989 21	Doncaster Rovers	2–0	Colchester United	Doncaster
	Robinson 41' (pen.); Turnbull 51'; Jones (red card) 26'	Report		Stadium: Belle Vue; Attendance: 2,942; Referee: K Brean

1 January 1990 22	Colchester United	3–1	Hartlepool United	Colchester
	Morgan 60'; Grainger 63'; Radford 86'	Report	Dalton 3'	Stadium: Layer Road; Attendance: 3,826; Referee: Alan Gunn

5 January 1990 23	Colchester United	0–1	Stockport County	Colchester
19:30 GMT		Report	Frain 89'	Stadium: Layer Road; Attendance: 3,609; Referee: I Hemley

12 January 1990 24	Halifax Town	1–1	Colchester United	Halifax
19:30 GMT	Hall 17'	Report	Scott 79'	Stadium: The Shay; Attendance: 1,397; Referee: Peter Jones

20 January 1990 25	Colchester United	1–0	Chesterfield	Colchester
	Wilkins 35'	Report		Stadium: Layer Road; Attendance: 3,016; Referee: D Hedges

27 January 1990 26	York City	3–1	Colchester United	York
	Longhurst 30', 36'; Reid 58'	Report	Wilkins 9'	Stadium: Bootham Crescent; Attendance: 2,311; Referee: G Aplin

3 February 1990 27	Scarborough	2–2	Colchester United	Scarborough
	Dobson 59'; Russell 70' (pen.)	Report	Tony English 67'; Morgan 85'	Stadium: Athletic Ground; Attendance: 1,786; Referee: T West

10 February 1990 28	Colchester United	1–2	Rochdale	Colchester
15:00 GMT	Morgan 26'	Report	Cole 39'; Johnson 45'	Stadium: Layer Road; Attendance: 2,744; Referee: G Pooley

17 February 1990 29	Lincoln City	2–1	Colchester United	Lincoln
	Lormor 6'; Smith 23'	Report	Wilkins 88'	Stadium: Sincil Bank; Attendance: 3,284; Referee: D Scott

20 February 1990 30	Colchester United	1–0	Grimsby Town	Colchester
	Bruce 31'	Report		Stadium: Layer Road; Attendance: 3,026; Referee: M James

23 February 1990 31	Colchester United	2–0	Gillingham	Colchester
19:45 GMT	Morgan 38' (pen.); Scott 70'	Report		Stadium: Layer Road; Attendance: 4,456; Referee: P Vanes

2 March 1990 32	Stockport County	1–1	Colchester United	Stockport
	Angell 47'	Report	Goddard 51'	Stadium: Edgeley Park; Attendance: 3,452; Referee: Keren Barratt

6 March 1990 33	Colchester United	4–0	Carlisle United	Colchester
19:30 GMT	Wilkins 2'; Marmon 31'; Morgan 52' (pen.), 64' (pen.)	Report		Stadium: Layer Road; Attendance: 3,752; Referee: Kelvin Morton

10 March 1990 34	Maidstone United	4–1	Colchester United	Dartford
	Lillis 15', 42', 43'; Butler 86'	Report	Morgan 68' (pen.)	Stadium: Watling Street; Attendance: 2,856; Referee: R Hamer

14 March 1990 35	Hereford United	2–0	Colchester United	Hereford
	Wheeler 49', 73'	Report		Stadium: Edgar Street; Attendance: 2,253; Referee: T Mills

17 March 1990 36	Colchester United	1–0	Aldershot	Colchester
15:00 GMT	Morgan 87'	Report		Stadium: Layer Road; Attendance: 2,682; Referee: D Vickers

24 March 1990 37	Wrexham	3–2	Colchester United	Wrexham
	Worthington 69', 89'; Thackeray 76'	Report	Marmon 27'; Wilkins 72'	Stadium: Racecourse Ground; Attendance: 4,653; Referee: J Kirkby

31 March 1990 38	Colchester United	1–0	Scunthorpe United	Colchester
15:00 BST	Morgan 45'	Report		Stadium: Layer Road; Attendance: 2,920; Referee: J Carter

7 April 1990 39	Peterborough United	1–0	Colchester United	Peterborough
	Sterling 30'	Report		Stadium: London Road Stadium; Attendance: 4,025; Referee: Neil Midgley

10 April 1990 40	Colchester United	0–1	Exeter City	Colchester
19:30 BST		Report	McNichol 60'	Stadium: Layer Road; Attendance: 3,369; Referee: D Reed

14 April 1990 41	Hartlepool United	0–2	Colchester United	Hartlepool
		Report	Bennett 76'; Collins 83'	Stadium: Victoria Park; Attendance: 3,397; Referee: William Burns

16 April 1990 42	Colchester United	0–2	Southend United	Colchester
15:00 BST		Report	Benjamin 42'; Daley 82'	Stadium: Layer Road; Attendance: 5,283; Referee: Ian Borrett

21 April 1990 43	Torquay United	4–1	Colchester United	Torquay
	Cookson 11'; Gilbert 24' (o.g.); Elliott 43'; Loram 59'	Report	Morgan 78' (pen.)	Stadium: Plainmoor; Attendance: 1,531; Referee: Howard King

24 April 1990 44	Colchester United	2–0	Doncaster Rovers	Colchester
	Marmon 31', 38'	Report	Harle (yellow card) 45' (red card)	Stadium: Layer Road; Attendance: 2,631; Referee: David Elleray

29 April 1990 45	Cambridge United	4–0	Colchester United	Cambridge
	Cheetham 25', 67' (pen.), 70' (pen.); Claridge 35'	Report		Stadium: Abbey Stadium; Attendance: 4,558; Referee: G Pooley

5 May 1990 46	Colchester United	1–2	Burnley	Colchester
15:00 BST	Morgan 17' (pen.)	Report	Taylor 39' (o.g.); White 65' (pen.)	Stadium: Layer Road; Attendance: 2,786; Referee: J Ashworth

=== League Cup ===
22 August 1989 1st round 1st leg	Colchester United	3–4	Southend United	Colchester
	Scott 27', 78'; Bennett 34'	Report	Bennett 15'; Crown 53', 80'; Martin 55'	Stadium: Layer Road; Attendance: 3,537; Referee: Tony Ward

29 August 1988 1st round 2nd leg	Southend United	2–1	Colchester United	Southend-on-Sea
	Crown 3' (pen.); Bennett 78'	Report	Collins 79'	Stadium: Roots Hall; Attendance: 3,763
Note: Southend won 6–4 on aggregate.

=== Associate Members' Cup ===
Group 7
Team	Pld	W	D	L	GF	GA	GD	Pts	Qualification
Maidstone United	2	2	0	0	6	3	+3	6	Qualified for next round
Northampton Town	2	1	0	1	5	4	+1	3	Qualified for next round
Colchester United	2	0	0	2	1	5	−4	0	

7 November 1989 Preliminary round (southern section)	Colchester United	0–3	Northampton Town	Colchester
19:30 GMT		Report	Barnes 26'; Chard 76'; Collins 88'	Stadium: Layer Road; Attendance: 1,780; Referee: D Vickers

10 January 1990 Preliminary round (southern section)	Maidstone United	2–1	Colchester United	Dartford
	Gall 8'; Butler 29'	Report	Ball 88'	Stadium: Watling Street; Attendance: 1,176; Referee: Phil Don

=== FA Cup ===
18 November 1989 1st round	Brentford	0–1	Colchester United	Brentford
		Report	Bennett 46'	Stadium: Griffin Park; Attendance: 4,171; Referee: Brian Hill

9 December 1989 2nd round	Colchester United	0–2	Birmingham City	Colchester
15:00 GMT		Report	Gleghorn 4', 90'	Stadium: Layer Road; Attendance: 3,858; Referee: Tony Ward

== Squad statistics ==
=== Appearances and goals ===
No.	Pos	Nat	Player	Total		Fourth Division		FA Cup		League Cup		Football League Trophy	
No.	Pos	Nat	Player	Apps	Goals	Apps	Goals	Apps	Goals	Apps	Goals	Apps	Goals
	DF	(United States) USA	Marcelle Bruce	31	1	28+1	1	2	0	0	0	0	0
	DF	(England) ENG	Scott Daniels	52	0	46	0	2	0	2	0	2	0
	DF	(England) ENG	Tony English	49	2	44	2	2	0	2	0	1	0
	DF	(England) ENG	Billy Gilbert	30	0	26+1	0	2	0	0	0	1	0
	DF	(England) ENG	Martin Grainger	8	2	4+3	2	0	0	0	0	1	0
	DF	(England) ENG	Neale Marmon	22	4	22	4	0	0	0	0	0	0
	DF	(England) ENG	John Pollard	8	0	1+6	0	0	0	0	0	0+1	0
	DF	(England) ENG	Clive Stafford	19	0	15+2	0	1	0	0	0	1	0
	MF	(Republic of Ireland) IRL	Eamonn Collins	45	3	39	2	2	0	2	1	2	0
	MF	(England) ENG	Robbie Devereux	2	0	1+1	0	0	0	0	0	0	0
	MF	(Republic of Ireland) IRL	Mark Kinsella	9	0	1+5	0	0	0	0+1	0	1+1	0
	MF	(England) ENG	Mark Radford	23	4	19+1	4	0	0	2	0	1	0
	MF	(England) ENG	Les Taylor	41	1	30+6	1	0+2	0	0+2	0	1	0
	FW	(England) ENG	Gary Bennett	42	6	26+10	4	2	1	2	1	2	0
	FW	(England) ENG	Trevor Morgan	36	12	31+1	12	2	0	0	0	2	0
	FW	(England) ENG	Steve Restarick	1	0	0+1	0	0	0	0	0	0	0
Players who appeared for Colchester who left during the season
	GK	(England) ENG	Scott Barrett	13	0	13	0	0	0	0	0	0	0
	GK	(Republic of Ireland) IRL	John Grace	25	0	19	0	2	0	2	0	2	0
	GK	(England) ENG	Roger Hansbury	4	0	4	0	0	0	0	0	0	0
	GK	(Wales) WAL	Andy Marriott	10	0	10	0	0	0	0	0	0	0
	DF	(England) ENG	Mark Blake	4	1	4	1	0	0	0	0	0	0
	DF	(England) ENG	Karl Goddard	16	1	16	1	0	0	0	0	0	0
	DF	(Northern Ireland) NIR	Jim Hagan	3	0	2	0	1	0	0	0	0	0
	DF	(England) ENG	Stuart Hicks	23	0	16+4	0	0	0	2	0	1	0
	DF	(England) ENG	Rodney Rooke	6	0	4	0	0	0	2	0	0	0
	DF	(Scotland) SCO	Robert Scott	30	5	14+11	3	0+1	0	2	2	1+1	0
	MF	(England) ENG	Steve Ball	5	1	3+1	0	0	0	0	0	1	1
	MF	(England) ENG	Richard Wilkins	49	5	43	5	2	0	2	0	1+1	0
	FW	(England) ENG	Ian Allinson	15	3	12+1	3	0	0	2	0	0	0
	FW	(England) ENG	Tommy English	16	3	12+1	3	2	0	0	0	1	0
	FW	(England) ENG	John Warner	2	0	1+1	0	0	0	0	0	0	0

=== Goalscorers ===
Place	Nationality	Position	Name	Fourth Division	FA Cup	League Cup	Football League Trophy	Total
1	(England)	FW	Trevor Morgan	12	0	0	0	12
2	(England)	WG	Gary Bennett	4	1	1	0	6
3	(Scotland)	FB	Robert Scott	3	0	2	0	5
3	(England)	MF/DF	Richard Wilkins	5	0	0	0	5
5	(England)	CB	Neale Marmon	4	0	0	0	4
5	(England)	MF	Mark Radford	4	0	0	0	4
7	(England)	WG	Ian Allinson	3	0	0	0	3
7	(Republic of Ireland)	MF	Eamonn Collins	2	0	1	0	3
7	(England)	FW	Tommy English	3	0	0	0	3
10	(England)	DF/MF	Tony English	2	0	0	0	2
10	(England)	FB	Martin Grainger	2	0	0	0	2
12	(England)	MF	Steve Ball	0	0	0	1	1
12	(England)	CB	Mark Blake	1	0	0	0	1
12	(United States)	FB	Marcelle Bruce	1	0	0	0	1
12	(England)	FB	Karl Goddard	1	0	0	0	1
12	(England)	MF	Les Taylor	1	0	0	0	1
			Own goals	0	0	0	0	0
			TOTALS	48	1	4	1	54

=== Disciplinary record ===
Nationality	Position	Name	Fourth Division		FA Cup		League Cup		Football League Trophy		Total	
Nationality	Position	Name	Yellow card	Red card	Yellow card	Red card	Yellow card	Red card	Yellow card	Red card	Yellow card	Red card
(Republic of Ireland)	MF	Eamonn Collins	0	1	0	0	0	0	0	0	0	1
(England)	DF/MF	Tony English	1	0	0	0	0	0	0	0	1	0
		TOTALS	1	1	0	0	0	0	0	0	1	1

=== Clean sheets ===
Number of games goalkeepers kept a clean sheet.

Place	Nationality	Player	Fourth Division	FA Cup	League Cup	Football League Trophy	Total
1	(England)	Scott Barrett	5	0	0	0	5
2	(Republic of Ireland)	John Grace	3	1	0	0	4
3	(Wales)	Andy Marriott	3	0	0	0	3
		TOTALS	11	1	0	0	12

=== Player debuts ===
Players making their first-team Colchester United debut in a fully competitive match.

Position	Nationality	Player	Date	Opponent	Ground	Notes
MF	(Republic of Ireland)	Eamonn Collins	18 August 1989	Chesterfield	Saltergate	
GK	(Republic of Ireland)	John Grace	18 August 1989	Chesterfield	Saltergate	
GK	(England)	Roger Hansbury	26 August 1989	Halifax Town	Layer Road	
MF	(Republic of Ireland)	Mark Kinsella	26 August 1989	Halifax Town	Layer Road	
CB	(England)	Mark Blake	8 September 1989	Hereford United	Layer Road	
MF	(England)	Robbie Devereux	13 October 1989	York City	Layer Road	
FW	(England)	Tommy English	21 October 1989	Scunthorpe United	Glanford Park	(Note: Third debut for the club)
CB	(England)	Billy Gilbert	21 October 1989	Scunthorpe United	Glanford Park	
FW	(England)	Trevor Morgan	28 October 1989	Peterborough United	Layer Road	
FB	(United States)	Marcelle Bruce	10 November 1989	Cambridge United	Layer Road	
DF	(Northern Ireland)	Jim Hagan	2 December 1989	Lincoln City	Layer Road	
FB	(England)	Martin Grainger	16 December 1989	Torquay United	Layer Road	
FW	(England)	John Warner	26 December 1989	Southend United	Roots Hall	(Note: Second debut for the club)
MF	(England)	Steve Ball	1 January 1990	Hartlepool United	Layer Road	
GK	(England)	Scott Barrett	12 January 1990	Halifax Town	The Shay	
CB	(England)	Neale Marmon	20 January 1990	Chesterfield	Layer Road	
FB	(England)	Karl Goddard	3 February 1990	Scarborough	Athletic Ground	
GK	(Wales)	Andy Marriott	24 March 1990	Wrexham	Racecourse Ground	
FW	(England)	Steve Restarick	7 April 1990	Peterborough United	London Road Stadium	

== See also ==
- List of Colchester United F.C. seasons
