= 1988–89 Colchester United F.C. season =

Colchester United
1988–89 season
- Chairman: Jonathan Crisp
- Manager: Roger Brown (until 15 October); Steve Foley (caretaker) (21 October until 12 January); Jock Wallace (from 12 January)
- Stadium: Layer Road
- Fourth Division: 22nd
- FA Cup: 4th round (eliminated by Sheffield United)
- League Cup: 1st round (eliminated by Northampton Town)
- Associate Members' Cup: Quarter-final (southern section) (eliminated by Hereford United)
- Top goalscorer: League: Mario Walsh (9); All: Mario Walsh (15)
- Highest home attendance: 7,588 v Sheffield United, 31 January 1989
- Lowest home attendance: 993 v Southend United, 20 December 1988
- Average home league attendance: 2,871
- Biggest win: 4–0 v Exeter City, 5 May 1989
- Biggest defeat: 0–8 v Leyton Orient, 15 October 1988
Home colours

The 1988–89 season was Colchester United's 47th season in their history and eighth consecutive season in fourth tier of English football, the Fourth Division. Alongside competing in the Fourth Division, the club also participated in the FA Cup, the League Cup and the Associate Members' Cup.

Roger Brown's unsuccessful tenure came to and end following a club record 8–0 defeat at Leyton Orient in October. With the club languishing bottom of the entire football league, former Rangers manager Jock Wallace boosted the club and helped them avoid relegation to the Conference, ending the season 22nd of 24 clubs.

Remarkably, Colchester had a successful FA Cup run as they saw off Fulham, Swansea City and Shrewsbury Town on their way to a fourth round tie with Sheffield United, who knocked out the U's following a Layer Road replay. They again reached the area quarter-final of the Associate Members' Cup where they were defeated by Hereford United, and a 5–0 thrashing at Northampton Town spelt an early exit from the League Cup.

== Season overview ==
Following a club record 8–0 defeat at Leyton Orient on 15 October, Roger Brown was dismissed from his position as manager. With the club bottom of the entire Football League for the first time since 1972, Steve Foley once again stepped up as caretaker manager. Under Foley's stewardship, the U's embarked on a successful FA Cup run, where they defeated Third Division Fulham and Second Division Swansea City and Shrewsbury Town. However, Third Division Sheffield United won 2–0 in a replay at Layer Road to progress to the fifth round.

Just weeks after signing for the club for £35,000, Paul McGee was sold to Wimbledon for a club record fee of £150,000, representing a huge profit in a short period of time.

Incoming as Brown's replacement was former Rangers manager Jock Wallace, with England World Cup winner Alan Ball his assistant. The impact of Wallace's appointment was instantaneous, with crowds rising over 3,500 the town became gripped by his passion and desire to avoid relegation to the Conference.

On 29 April, the U's travelled to their closest rivals Darlington, a game which Colchester won 2–1 thanks to a Robert Scott goal. The win lifted Colchester off the bottom of the league table for the first time since Brown's departure, and two successive home wins against Halifax Town and Exeter City confirmed Colchester's Fourth Division status for another year.

Meanwhile, in the League Cup, Colchester suffered an early exit following a 0–0 draw at home to Northampton Town and then a 5–0 hammering at the County Ground in the return leg. In the Associate Members' Cup, Colchester won their two group stage games against Lincoln City and Southend United, before regaining some pride by beating Leyton Orient at Layer Road to progress to the area quarter-final. They were then beaten 1–0 by visitors Hereford United.

== Players ==
As of match played 13 May 1989.

| Name | Position | Nationality | Place of birth | Date of birth | Apps | Goals | Signed from | Date signed | Fee |
Goalkeepers
| Mark Walton | GK | (Wales) | Merthyr Tydfil | 1 June 1969 (aged 19) | 24 | 0 | (England) Luton Town | 26 December 1987 (Note: Date of signing refers to the date of the player's first game in his third spell for the club) | £17,500 |
Defenders
| Phil Coleman | FB | (England) | Woolwich | 8 September 1960 (aged 27) | 105 | 7 | (Finland) MyPa | December 1988 | Free transfer |
| Scott Daniels | CB | (England) | South Benfleet | 22 November 1969 (aged 18) | 1 | 0 | Apprentice | 23 April 1988 (Note: Date of signing refers to the date of the player's first game for the club) | Free transfer |
| Tony English | DF/MF | (England) | Luton | 19 October 1966 (aged 21) | 166 | 23 | (England) Coventry City | 24 December 1984 | Free transfer |
| Stuart Hicks | CB | (England) | Peterborough | 30 May 1967 (aged 21) | 7 | 0 | (England) Wisbech Town | March 1988 | Free transfer |
| Colin Hill | CB | (Northern Ireland) | (England) Uxbridge | 12 November 1963 (aged 24) | 30 | 1 | (Portugal) Marítimo | 30 October 1987 | Undisclosed |
| John Pollard | CB | (England) | Chelmsford | 17 November 1971 (aged 16) | 0 | 0 | Apprentice | 5 May 1989 | Free transfer |
| Rodney Rooke | FB | (England) | Orsett | 7 April 1970 (aged 18) | 0 | 0 | Apprentice | Summer 1988 | Non-contract |
| Robert Scott | FB | (Scotland) | Broxburn | 13 January 1964 (aged 24) | 0 | 0 | (Scotland) Whitburn Junior | 24 March 1989 | Free transfer |
| Clive Stafford | FB | (England) | Ipswich | 4 April 1963 (aged 25) | 0 | 0 | (England) Diss Town | February 1989 | Unknown |
Midfielders
| Mark Radford | MF | (England) | Leicester | 20 December 1968 (aged 19) | 16 | 0 | Apprentice | 26 January 1987 | Free transfer |
| Les Taylor | MF | (England) | North Shields | 4 December 1956 (aged 31) | 0 | 0 | (England) Reading | January 1989 | £20,000 |
| Richard Wilkins | MF/DF | (England) | Lambeth | 28 May 1965 (aged 23) | 84 | 15 | (England) Haverhill Rovers | 18 November 1986 | Undisclosed |
Forwards
| Ian Allinson | WG | (England) | Hitchin | 1 October 1957 (aged 30) | 363 | 82 | (England) Luton Town | 16 December 1988 (Note: Date of signing refers to the date of the player's first game in his second spell for the club) | Free transfer |
| Gary Bennett | WG | (England) | Enfield Town | 13 November 1970 (aged 17) | 0 | 0 | (England) Tottenham Hotpsur | 21 October 1988 | Free transfer |
| Steve Restarick | FW | (England) | Barking | 28 November 1971 (aged 16) | 0 | 0 | (England) West Ham United | Early 1988–89 season | Free transfer |
| Mario Walsh | FW | (England) | Paddington | 19 January 1966 (aged 22) | 15 | 2 | (England) Torquay United | Summer 1987 | £15,000 |

== Transfers ==
=== In ===
| Date | Position | Nationality | Name | From | Fee | Ref. |
|---|---|---|---|---|---|---|
| Summer 1988 | FB | (England) | Kevin Bedford | (England) Wimbledon | Undisclosed | |
| Summer 1988 | FB | (England) | Steve Cartwright | (England) Tamworth | Free transfer | |
| Summer 1988 | FB | (England) | Rodney Rooke | Apprentice | Non-contract | |
| Summer 1988 | FB | (England) | Dave Swindlehurst | (England) Wimbledon | Undisclosed | |
| Summer 1988 | MF | (England) | Dave Barnett | (England) Windsor & Eton | Undisclosed | |
| Early 1988–89 season | FW | (England) | Steve Restarick | (England) West Ham United | Free transfer | |
| October 1988 | WG | (England) | Ian Brown | (England) Harwich & Parkeston | Non-contract | |
| 21 October 1988 | WG | (England) | Gary Bennett | (England) Tottenham Hotspur | Free transfer | (Note: Date of signing refers to the date of the player's first game for the club) |
| 11 November 1988 | GK | (England) | Mark Coombe | (England) Bristol City | Non-contract | |
| December 1988 | FB | (England) | Phil Coleman | (Finland) MyPa | Free transfer | |
| 16 December 1988 | WG | (England) | Ian Allinson | (England) Luton Town | Free transfer | (Note: Date of signing refers to the date of the player's first game in his second spell for the club) |
| January 1989 | MF | (England) | Les Taylor | (England) Reading | £20,000 | |
| February 1989 | FB | (England) | Clive Stafford | (England) Diss Town | Unknown | |
| 8 February 1989 | WG | (Republic of Ireland) | Paul McGee | (Republic of Ireland) Bohemian | £35,000 | |
| 18 February 1989 | FW | (England) | John Warner | (England) Burnham Ramblers | Free transfer | |
| 24 March 1989 | FB | (Scotland) | Robert Scott | (Scotland) Whitburn Junior | Free transfer | |
| 5 May 1989 | CB | (England) | John Pollard | Apprentice | Free transfer | |

- Total spending: ▼ ~ £55,000

=== Out ===
| Date | Position | Nationality | Name | To | Fee | Ref. |
|---|---|---|---|---|---|---|
| End of season | CB | (England) | John Ray | (England) Wycombe Wanderers | Undisclosed | |
| End of season | MF | (England) | Keith Williams | (England) Swanage Town & Herston | Released | (Note: Joined as player-coach) |
| Summer 1988 | WG | (Republic of Ireland) | Tommy Keane | (Republic of Ireland) Galway United | Undisclosed | |
| July 1988 | MF | (England) | Gary Smith | (England) Enfield | Undisclosed | |
| October 1988 | WG | (England) | Ian Brown | (England) Harwich & Parkeston | Released | |
| October 1988 | WG | (England) | Winston White | (England) Burnley | £17,500 | |
| 15 October 1988 | FB | (England) | Steve Cartwright | (England) Tamworth | Released | (Note: Date of departure refers to the date of the player's final game for the club) |
| 11 November 1988 | FB | (England) | Stephen Grenfell | (England) Bromley | Free transfer | |
| December 1988 | CB | (England) | Rudi Hedman | (England) Crystal Palace | £100,000 | |
| 3 December 1988 | GK | (England) | Mark Coombe | (England) Torquay United | Free transfer | |
| 20 December 1988 | MF | (England) | Nick Chatterton | Free agent | Retired | |
| 31 January 1989 | FB | (England) | Dave Swindlehurst | (England) Bromley | Undisclosed | (Note: Joined as player-manager) |
| 1 March 1989 | WG | (Republic of Ireland) | Paul McGee | (England) Wimbledon | £150,000 | |
| 27 March 1989 | FB | (England) | Kevin Bedford | Unknown | Unknown | |
| April 1989 | MF | (England) | Dave Barnett | (Canada) Edmonton Brick Men | Released | |
| 21 April 1989 | WG | (England) | Lee Hunter | (England) Wivenhoe Town | Released | |
| 13 May 1989 | CB | (England) | Steve Hetzke | Free agent | Retired | (Note: Joined Chesterfield as coach) |
| 13 May 1989 | FW | (Hong Kong) | Dale Tempest | (Hong Kong) Eastern | Undisclosed | |
| 13 May 1989 | FW | (England) | John Warner | (England) Heybridge Swifts | Released | (Note: Date of departure refers to the date of the player's final game in his first spell for the club) |

- Total incoming: ▲ ~ £267,500

=== Loans in ===
| Date | Position | Nationality | Name | From | End date | Ref. |
|---|---|---|---|---|---|---|
| 24 October 1988 | MF | (England) | Tony Kelly | (England) West Bromwich Albion | 21 January 1989 | (Note: Loan end date refers to the date of the player's final game for the club) |
| February 1989 | GK | (Scotland) | Tom McAlister | (England) West Ham United | 1 May 1989 | |

=== Loans out ===
| Date | Position | Nationality | Name | To | End date | Ref. |
|---|---|---|---|---|---|---|
| December 1988 | FB | (England) | Dave Swindlehurst | (England) Peterborough United | December 1988 | |

== Match details ==
=== Fourth Division ===
==== Results round by round ====
| Round | 1 | 2 | 3 | 4 | 5 | 6 | 7 | 8 | 9 | 10 | 11 | 12 | 13 | 14 | 15 | 16 | 17 | 18 | 19 | 20 | 21 | 22 | 23 | 24 | 25 | 26 | 27 | 28 | 29 | 30 | 31 | 32 | 33 | 34 | 35 | 36 | 37 | 38 | 39 | 40 | 41 | 42 | 43 | 44 | 45 | 46 |
|---|---|---|---|---|---|---|---|---|---|---|---|---|---|---|---|---|---|---|---|---|---|---|---|---|---|---|---|---|---|---|---|---|---|---|---|---|---|---|---|---|---|---|---|---|---|---|
| Ground | H | A | H | A | H | A | H | A | H | A | H | A | H | A | A | H | H | A | A | H | H | A | H | A | A | H | A | H | H | A | H | A | A | H | A | H | H | A | A | A | H | H | A | H | H | A |
| Result | W | D | L | D | W | L | L | W | L | L | L | L | D | L | L | D | L | L | D | L | L | D | L | L | D | D | W | W | D | L | W | L | L | D | L | W | D | L | D | D | D | W | W | W | W | W |
| Position | 8 | 1 | 9 | 12 | 10 | 12 | 16 | 11 | 17 | 21 | 21 | 22 | 22 | 23 | 23 | 22 | 23 | 24 | 24 | 24 | 24 | 24 | 24 | 24 | 24 | 24 | 24 | 24 | 24 | 24 | 24 | 24 | 24 | 24 | 24 | 24 | 24 | 24 | 24 | 24 | 24 | 24 | 23 | 23 | 23 | 22 |

Source: 11v11.com
A = Away; H = Home; W = Win; D = Draw; L = Loss

==== League table ====
| Pos | Team | Pld | W | D | L | GF | GA | GD | Pts | Promotion or relegation |
|---|---|---|---|---|---|---|---|---|---|---|
| 20 | Stockport County | 46 | 10 | 21 | 15 | 54 | 52 | +2 | 51 | |
| 21 | Halifax Town | 46 | 13 | 11 | 22 | 69 | 75 | −6 | 50 | |
| 22 | Colchester United | 46 | 12 | 14 | 20 | 60 | 78 | −18 | 50 | |
| 23 | Doncaster Rovers | 46 | 13 | 10 | 23 | 49 | 78 | −29 | 49 | |
| 24 | Darlington (R) | 46 | 8 | 18 | 20 | 53 | 76 | −23 | 42 | Relegation to the Football Conference |

(R) Relegated

==== Matches ====
| 27 August 1988 1 | Colchester United | 1–0 | York City | Colchester |
| 15:00 BST | Tempest 58'; Barnett (yellow card) (red card) | Report | | Stadium: Layer Road; Attendance: 1,664; Referee: R Pawley |

| 2 September 1988 2 | Tranmere Rovers | 0–0 | Colchester United | Birkenhead |
| | | Report | | Stadium: Prenton Park; Attendance: 3,401; Referee: Keith Cooper |

| 9 September 1988 3 | Colchester United | 0–1 | Doncaster Rovers | Colchester |
| | | Report | Rankine 80' | Stadium: Layer Road; Attendance: 1,726; Referee: J Moules |

| 16 September 1988 4 | Wrexham | 2–2 | Colchester United | Wrexham |
| | Hunter 55'; Cooper 68' | Report | Swindlehurst 17'; Tempest 83' | Stadium: Racecourse Ground; Attendance: 2,873; Referee: R Hamer |

| 20 September 1988 5 | Colchester United | 3–1 | Scarborough | Colchester |
| 19:30 BST | Swindlehurst 23' (pen.); Tempest 88'; Wilkins 90' | Report | Cook 50' (pen.) | Stadium: Layer Road; Attendance: 1,420; Referee: Kelvin Morton |

| 24 September 1988 6 | Burnley | 2–0 | Colchester United | Burnley |
| | Rowell 43'; O'Connell 55' | Report | | Stadium: Turf Moor; Attendance: 7,177; Referee: Alan Wilkie |

| 1 October 1988 7 | Colchester United | 1–3 | Lincoln City | Colchester |
| | Swindlehurst 14' | Report | Hobson 5', 90'; Hill 51' (o.g.) | Stadium: Layer Road; Attendance: 1,529; Referee: M James |

| 4 October 1988 8 | Carlisle United | 1–2 | Colchester United | Carlisle |
| | Sendall 48' | Report | Tempest 47'; Swindlehurst 61' | Stadium: Brunton Park; Attendance: 2,193; Referee: A Simmons |

| 8 October 1988 9 | Colchester United | 1–2 | Scunthorpe United | Colchester |
| | Hedman 28'; Barnett (red card) 78' | Report | Flounders 13'; Richardson 86' | Stadium: Layer Road; Attendance: 1,299; Referee: Ian Borrett |

| 15 October 1988 10 | Leyton Orient | 8–0 | Colchester United | Leyton |
| | Hull 8', 53', 74'; Sitton 11'; Baker 20'; Comfort 41'; Hales 85' (pen.); Day 90' | Report | | Stadium: Brisbane Road; Attendance: 3,421; Referee: Paul Durkin |

| 21 October 1988 11 | Colchester United | 1–2 | Cambridge United | Colchester |
| 19:30 BST | English 88' | Report | Anderson 65', 79' | Stadium: Layer Road; Attendance: 2,138; Referee: G Pooley |

| 25 October 1988 12 | Rotherham United | 2–0 | Colchester United | Rotherham |
| | Green 48'; Williamson 90' | Report | | Stadium: Millmoor; Attendance: 4,066; Referee: John Lloyd |

| 28 October 1988 13 | Colchester United | 1–1 | Stockport County | Colchester |
| 19:30 GMT | Tempest 37' | Report | Hill 48' (o.g.) | Stadium: Layer Road; Attendance: 1,643; Referee: Paul Alcock |

| 4 November 1988 14 | Crewe Alexandra | 3–1 | Colchester United | Crewe |
| | Gardiner 13'; Edwards 63'; Callaghan 76' | Report | Walsh 9' | Stadium: Gresty Road; Attendance: 2,787; Referee: David Allison |

| 8 November 1988 15 | Halifax Town | 3–2 | Colchester United | Halifax |
| | Martin 42'; McPhillips 45' (pen.), 87' | Report | Kelly 13'; Wilkins 84' | Stadium: The Shay; Attendance: 2,176; Referee: Joe Timmons |

| 11 November 1988 16 | Colchester United | 2–2 | Torquay United | Colchester |
| 19:30 GMT | English 13'; Kelly 85' | Report | Loram 62'; Thompson 90' | Stadium: Layer Road; Attendance: 1,926; Referee: David Elleray |

| 25 November 1988 17 | Colchester United | 1–2 | Darlington | Colchester |
| 19:30 GMT | Radford 72' | Report | Worthington 26' (pen.), 62' | Stadium: Layer Road; Attendance: 1,550; Referee: Tony Ward |

| 3 December 1988 18 | Exeter City | 4–2 | Colchester United | Exeter |
| | Taylor 18'; Neville 30'; Hiley 53'; Rowbotham 88' | Report | Swindlehurst 25'; Tempest 79' | Stadium: St James Park; Attendance: 2,132; Referee: Keith Cooper |

| 16 December 1988 19 | Rochdale | 1–1 | Colchester United | Rochdale |
| | O'Shaughnessy 29' | Report | Walsh 58' | Stadium: Spotland Stadium; Attendance: 1,258; Referee: J Key |

| 26 December 1988 20 | Colchester United | 1–2 | Peterborough United | Colchester |
| 15:00 GMT | Walsh 65' | Report | Gunn 44' (pen.); McElhinney 87' | Stadium: Layer Road; Attendance: 2,828; Referee: I Hemley |

| 30 December 1988 21 | Colchester United | 1–2 | Hartlepool United | Colchester |
| 19:30 GMT | English 45' | Report | Borthwick 67'; Stokes 78' | Stadium: Layer Road; Attendance: 2,359; Referee: Vic Callow |

| 2 January 1989 22 | Grimsby Town | 2–2 | Colchester United | Cleethorpes |
| | O'Kelly 14'; Alexander 26' | Report | Wilkins 32'; Allinson 76' | Stadium: Blundell Park; Attendance: 4,472; Referee: Stephen Lodge |

| 13 January 1989 23 | Colchester United | 2–3 | Tranmere Rovers | Colchester |
| 19:30 GMT | Walsh 16', 50' | Report | McCarrick 53'; Harvey 61'; Vickers 89' | Stadium: Layer Road; Attendance: 3,458; Referee: M James |

| 21 January 1989 24 | York City | 2–0 | Colchester United | York |
| | Dixon 33'; Howlett 66' | Report | | Stadium: Bootham Crescent; Attendance: 2,219; Referee: Roger Dilkes |

| 4 February 1989 25 | Scarborough | 0–0 | Colchester United | Scarborough |
| | | Report | | Stadium: Athletic Ground; Attendance: 1,913; Referee: Keith Hackett |

| 10 February 1989 26 | Colchester United | 2–2 | Burnley | Colchester |
| 19:30 GMT | Allinson 62'; Walsh 74' | Report | White 14', 16' (pen.) | Stadium: Layer Road; Attendance: 3,809; Referee: M Bailey |

| 18 February 1989 27 | Scunthorpe United | 2–3 | Colchester United | Scunthorpe |
| | Lister 57'; Nicol 75' | Report | Wilkins 10'; English 23'; Warner 84' | Stadium: Glanford Park; Attendance: 4,286; Referee: K Redfearn |

| 24 February 1989 28 | Colchester United | 1–0 | Leyton Orient | Colchester |
| 19:30 GMT | Allinson 20' | Report | | Stadium: Layer Road; Attendance: 4,269; Referee: Ian Borrett |

| 28 February 1989 29 | Colchester United | 1–1 | Rotherham United | Colchester |
| 19:30 GMT | Allinson 81' | Report | Grealish 27' | Stadium: Layer Road; Attendance: 3,671; Referee: D Hedges |

| 5 March 1989 30 | Cambridge United | 3–1 | Colchester United | Cambridge |
| | Taylor 32'; Leadbitter 42'; Ryan 53' | Report | Wilkins 30' | Stadium: Abbey Stadium; Attendance: 4,205; Referee: J Moules |

| 10 March 1989 31 | Colchester United | 2–1 | Crewe Alexandra | Colchester |
| 19:30 GMT | English 19', 82' | Report | Murphy 43' | Stadium: Layer Road; Attendance: 3,088; Referee: A Seville |

| 13 March 1989 32 | Stockport County | 1–0 | Colchester United | Stockport |
| | Cooke 49' | Report | | Stadium: Edgeley Park; Attendance: 2,027; Referee: George Courtney |

| 18 March 1989 33 | Doncaster Rovers | 3–1 | Colchester United | Doncaster |
| | Rankine 22', 38'; Jones 89' | Report | Walsh 16' (red card) 84' | Stadium: Belle Vue; Attendance: 1,237; Referee: R Pawley |

| 24 March 1989 34 | Colchester United | 0–0 | Grimsby Town | Colchester |
| 19:30 GMT | | Report | | Stadium: Layer Road; Attendance: 4,507; Referee: Alan Gunn |

| 27 March 1989 35 | Peterborough United | 3–0 | Colchester United | Peterborough |
| | Hetzke 34' (o.g.); Longhurst 85', 90' | Report | Hetzke (red card) 88' | Stadium: London Road Stadium; Attendance: 3,529; Referee: D Reeves |

| 31 March 1989 36 | Colchester United | 3–0 | Rochdale | Colchester |
| 19:30 BST | Scott 50'; Bennett; Wilkins 75' | Report | | Stadium: Layer Road; Attendance: 3,631; Referee: D Axcell |

| 4 April 1989 37 | Colchester United | 1–1 | Hereford United | Colchester |
| 19:30 BST | English 35' | Report | Bradley 27' | Stadium: Layer Road; Attendance: 2,862; Referee: I Hemley |

| 8 April 1989 38 | Hartlepool United | 2–1 | Colchester United | Hartlepool |
| | Tinkler 47'; Barker 69' | Report | Scott 66' | Stadium: Victoria Park; Attendance: 2,015; Referee: I Hendrick |

| 12 April 1989 39 | Hereford United | 1–1 | Colchester United | Hereford |
| | McLoughlin 85' | Report | Scott 44' | Stadium: Edgar Street; Attendance: 2,015; Referee: Roger Gifford |

| 15 April 1989 40 | Lincoln City | 1–1 | Colchester United | Lincoln |
| | McGinley 62' | Report | Wilkins 83' | Stadium: Sincil Bank; Attendance: 3,519; Referee: T West |

| 21 April 1989 41 | Colchester United | 1–1 | Carlisle United | Colchester |
| 19:30 BST | Scott 90' | Report | Proudlock 44' | Stadium: Layer Road; Attendance: 3,906; Referee: Brian Hill |

| 25 April 1989 42 | Colchester United | 2–1 | Wrexham | Colchester |
| | Allinson 26'; Hetzke 88' | Report | Russell 40'; Buxton (red card) 73' | Stadium: Layer Road; Attendance: 2,918; Referee: Kelvin Morton |

| 29 April 1989 43 | Darlington | 1–2 | Colchester United | Darlington |
| | Bonnyman 21' (pen.) | Report | Walsh 39'; Scott 66' | Stadium: Feethams; Attendance: 7,126; Referee: Keith Hackett |

| 1 May 1989 44 | Colchester United | 3–2 | Halifax Town | Colchester |
| 19:30 BST | Wilkins 61'; Warner 74'; Allinson 79' (pen.) | Report | Hill 27' (o.g.); McPhillips 54' | Stadium: Layer Road; Attendance: 5,065; Referee: Phil Don |

| 5 May 1989 45 | Colchester United | 4–0 | Exeter City | Colchester |
| 19:30 BST | Walsh 5'; Allinson 40'; Pollard 83'; English 90' | Report | | Stadium: Layer Road; Attendance: 5,256; Referee: J Ashworth |

| 13 May 1989 46 | Torquay United | 1–3 | Colchester United | Torquay |
| | Allinson 46' (o.g.) | Report | Warner 52'; Hetzke 88'; Tempest 90' | Stadium: Plainmoor; Attendance: 2,066; Referee: J Deakin |

=== League Cup ===
| 29 August 1988 1st round 1st leg | Colchester United | 0–0 | Northampton Town | Colchester |
| 19:30 BST | | Report | | Stadium: Layer Road; Attendance: 1,678; Referee: Phil Don |

| 6 September 1988 1st round 2nd leg | Northampton Town | 5–0 | Colchester United | Northampton |
| | Singleton 9'; Culpin 27'; Adcock 43', 81'; Gilbert 68' (pen.) | Report | | Stadium: County Ground; Attendance: 3,957 |
Note: Northampton won 5–0 on aggregate.

=== FA Cup ===
| 19 November 1988 1st round | Fulham | 0–1 | Colchester United | Fulham |
| | | Report | Walsh 10' | Stadium: Craven Cottage; Attendance: 4,481; Referee: J Moules |

| 10 December 1988 2nd round | Colchester United | 2–2 | Swansea City | Colchester |
| 15:00 GMT | Hedman 13'; Wilkins 66' | Report | Coleman 38'; Melville 66' | Stadium: Layer Road; Attendance: 2,697; Referee: Keith Cooper |

| 13 February 1988 2nd round replay | Swansea City | 1–3 | Colchester United | Swansea |
| | Wade 55' | Report | Hedman 9'; Walsh 39'; Wilkins 65' | Stadium: Vetch Field; Attendance: 4,045; Referee: Keith Cooper |

| 7 January 1989 3rd round | Shrewsbury Town | 0–3 | Colchester United | Shrewsbury |
| | | Report | Walsh 17'; Pratley 47' (o.g.); Allinson 85' (pen.) | Stadium: Gay Meadow; Attendance: 3,982; Referee: R Nixon |

| 28 January 1989 4th round | Sheffield United | 3–3 | Colchester United | Sheffield |
| 15:00 GMT | Todd 40'; Deane 58'; Bryson 72' | Report | Hicks 27'; Hill 37'; Hetzke 81' | Stadium: Bramall Lane; Attendance: 14,406; Referee: Alan Gunn |

| 31 January 1989 4th round replay | Colchester United | 0–2 | Sheffield United | Colchester |
| 19:30 GMT | | Report | Deane 3', 76' | Stadium: Layer Road; Attendance: 7,588; Referee: Alan Gunn |

=== Associate Members' Cup ===
| Team | Pts | Pld | W | D | L | F | A | GD |
|---|---|---|---|---|---|---|---|---|
| Colchester United (Q) | 6 | 2 | 2 | 0 | 0 | 4 | 2 | +2 |
| Southend United (Q) | 3 | 2 | 1 | 0 | 1 | 3 | 3 | 0 |
| Lincoln City | 0 | 2 | 0 | 0 | 2 | 2 | 4 | -2 |

^{(Q) Qualified for next round}

| 30 November 1988 Preliminary round (southern section) | Lincoln City | 1–2 | Colchester United | Lincoln |
| | Gamble 57' (pen.) | Report | Walsh 55', 85' | Stadium: Sincil Bank; Attendance: 1,448; Referee: G Stones |

| 20 December 1988 Preliminary round (southern section) | Colchester United | 2–1 | Southend United | Colchester |
| | Tempest 23'; Swindlehurst 90' | Report | Young 29' | Stadium: Layer Road; Attendance: 993; Referee: D Vickers |

| 17 January 1989 1st round (southern section) | Colchester United | 3–1 | Leyton Orient | Colchester |
| 19:30 GMT | Walsh 27'; Allinson 58'; Wilkins 77' | Report | Hull 66' | Stadium: Layer Road; Attendance: 1,736; Referee: R Wiseman |

| 14 February 1989 Quarter-final (southern section) | Colchester United | 0–1 | Hereford United | Colchester |
| | | Report | Stant 18' | Stadium: Layer Road; Attendance: 2,059; Referee: Alf Buksh |

== Squad statistics ==
=== Appearances and goals ===
| No. | Pos | Nat | Player | Total | | Fourth Division | | FA Cup | | League Cup | | Football League Trophy | |
| No. | Pos | Nat | Player | Apps | Goals | Apps | Goals | Apps | Goals | Apps | Goals | Apps | Goals |
|---|---|---|---|---|---|---|---|---|---|---|---|---|---|
| | GK | (Wales) WAL | Mark Walton | 32 | 0 | 23 | 0 | 5 | 0 | 2 | 0 | 2 | 0 |
| | DF | (England) ENG | Phil Coleman | 14 | 0 | 6+4 | 0 | 2 | 0 | 0 | 0 | 2 | 0 |
| | DF | (England) ENG | Scott Daniels | 34 | 0 | 18+8 | 0 | 5 | 0 | 0 | 0 | 2+1 | 0 |
| | DF | (England) ENG | Tony English | 45 | 8 | 36 | 8 | 6 | 0 | 1 | 0 | 2 | 0 |
| | DF | (England) ENG | Stuart Hicks | 46 | 1 | 34+3 | 0 | 5 | 1 | 0 | 0 | 4 | 0 |
| | DF | (Northern Ireland) NIR | Colin Hill | 52 | 1 | 42+2 | 0 | 5 | 1 | 2 | 0 | 1 | 0 |
| | DF | (England) ENG | John Pollard | 2 | 1 | 0+2 | 1 | 0 | 0 | 0 | 0 | 0 | 0 |
| | DF | (England) ENG | Rodney Rooke | 1 | 0 | 0 | 0 | 0 | 0 | 0 | 0 | 1 | 0 |
| | DF | (Scotland) SCO | Robert Scott | 12 | 5 | 12 | 5 | 0 | 0 | 0 | 0 | 0 | 0 |
| | DF | (England) ENG | Clive Stafford | 16 | 0 | 16 | 0 | 0 | 0 | 0 | 0 | 0 | 0 |
| | MF | (England) ENG | Mark Radford | 36 | 1 | 16+14 | 1 | 2+2 | 0 | 0+1 | 0 | 1 | 0 |
| | MF | (England) ENG | Les Taylor | 16 | 0 | 14+2 | 0 | 0 | 0 | 0 | 0 | 0 | 0 |
| | MF | (England) ENG | Richard Wilkins | 47 | 11 | 39+1 | 8 | 2+1 | 2 | 2 | 0 | 1+1 | 1 |
| | FW | (England) ENG | Ian Allinson | 31 | 9 | 24+1 | 7 | 3 | 1 | 0 | 0 | 3 | 1 |
| | FW | (England) ENG | Gary Bennett | 9 | 1 | 6+3 | 1 | 0 | 0 | 0 | 0 | 0 | 0 |
| | FW | (England) ENG | Mario Walsh | 36 | 15 | 25+2 | 9 | 6 | 3 | 0 | 0 | 3 | 3 |
Players who appeared for Colchester who left during the season
| | GK | (England) ENG | Mark Coombe | 5 | 0 | 3 | 0 | 1 | 0 | 0 | 0 | 1 | 0 |
| | GK | (Scotland) SCO | Tom McAlister | 21 | 0 | 20 | 0 | 0 | 0 | 0 | 0 | 1 | 0 |
| | DF | (England) ENG | Kevin Bedford | 36 | 0 | 24+2 | 0 | 6 | 0 | 0+1 | 0 | 3 | 0 |
| | DF | (England) ENG | Steve Cartwright | 12 | 0 | 10 | 0 | 0 | 0 | 2 | 0 | 0 | 0 |
| | DF | (England) ENG | Stephen Grenfell | 9 | 0 | 5+1 | 0 | 0 | 0 | 2 | 0 | 1 | 0 |
| | DF | (England) ENG | Rudi Hedman | 22 | 3 | 17 | 1 | 3 | 2 | 1 | 0 | 1 | 0 |
| | DF | (England) ENG | Steve Hetzke | 32 | 3 | 22+2 | 2 | 3 | 1 | 2 | 0 | 3 | 0 |
| | DF | (England) ENG | Dave Swindlehurst | 18 | 6 | 12 | 5 | 2 | 0 | 2 | 0 | 2 | 1 |
| | MF | (England) ENG | Dave Barnett | 30 | 0 | 19+1 | 0 | 3+2 | 0 | 2 | 0 | 3 | 0 |
| | MF | (England) ENG | Nick Chatterton | 4 | 0 | 1+1 | 0 | 0 | 0 | 0 | 0 | 1+1 | 0 |
| | MF | (England) ENG | Tony Kelly | 20 | 2 | 13 | 2 | 4 | 0 | 0 | 0 | 3 | 0 |
| | FW | (England) ENG | Lee Hunter | 8 | 0 | 4+4 | 0 | 0 | 0 | 0 | 0 | 0 | 0 |
| | FW | (Republic of Ireland) IRL | Paul McGee | 4 | 0 | 3 | 0 | 0 | 0 | 0 | 0 | 1 | 0 |
| | FW | (England) ENG | Dale Tempest | 41 | 8 | 25+8 | 7 | 3+1 | 0 | 2 | 0 | 2 | 1 |
| | FW | (England) ENG | John Warner | 15 | 3 | 7+8 | 3 | 0 | 0 | 0 | 0 | 0 | 0 |
| | FW | (England) ENG | Winston White | 12 | 0 | 10 | 0 | 0 | 0 | 2 | 0 | 0 | 0 |

=== Goalscorers ===
| Place | Nationality | Position | Name | Fourth Division | FA Cup | League Cup | Football League Trophy | Total |
|---|---|---|---|---|---|---|---|---|
| 1 | (England) | FW | Mario Walsh | 9 | 3 | 0 | 3 | 15 |
| 2 | (England) | MF/DF | Richard Wilkins | 8 | 2 | 0 | 1 | 11 |
| 3 | (England) | WG | Ian Allinson | 7 | 1 | 0 | 1 | 9 |
| 4 | (England) | DF/MF | Tony English | 8 | 0 | 0 | 0 | 8 |
| 4 | (Hong Kong) | FW | Dale Tempest | 7 | 0 | 0 | 1 | 8 |
| 6 | (England) | FB | Dave Swindlehurst | 5 | 0 | 0 | 1 | 6 |
| 7 | (England) | FB | Robert Scott | 5 | 0 | 0 | 0 | 5 |
| 8 | (England) | CB | Rudi Hedman | 1 | 2 | 0 | 0 | 3 |
| 8 | (England) | CB | Steve Hetzke | 2 | 1 | 0 | 0 | 3 |
| 8 | (England) | FW | John Warner | 3 | 0 | 0 | 0 | 3 |
| 11 | (England) | MF | Tony Kelly | 2 | 0 | 0 | 0 | 2 |
| 12 | (England) | WG | Gary Bennett | 1 | 0 | 0 | 0 | 1 |
| 12 | (England) | CB | Stuart Hicks | 0 | 1 | 0 | 0 | 1 |
| 12 | (Northern Ireland) | CB | Colin Hill | 0 | 1 | 0 | 0 | 1 |
| 12 | (England) | CB | John Pollard | 1 | 0 | 0 | 0 | 1 |
| 12 | (England) | MF | Mark Radford | 1 | 0 | 0 | 0 | 1 |
| | | | Own goals | 0 | 1 | 0 | 0 | 1 |
| | | | TOTALS | 60 | 12 | 0 | 7 | 79 |

=== Disciplinary record ===
| Nationality | Position | Name | Fourth Division | | FA Cup | | League Cup | | Football League Trophy | | Total | |
| Nationality | Position | Name | Yellow card | Red card | Yellow card | Red card | Yellow card | Red card | Yellow card | Red card | Yellow card | Red card |
|---|---|---|---|---|---|---|---|---|---|---|---|---|
| (England) | MF | Dave Barnett | 1 | 2 | 0 | 0 | 0 | 0 | 0 | 0 | 1 | 2 |
| (England) | CB | Steve Hetzke | 0 | 1 | 0 | 0 | 0 | 0 | 0 | 0 | 0 | 1 |
| (England) | FW | Mario Walsh | 0 | 1 | 0 | 0 | 0 | 0 | 0 | 0 | 0 | 1 |
| | | TOTALS | 1 | 4 | 0 | 0 | 0 | 0 | 0 | 0 | 1 | 4 |

=== Clean sheets ===
Number of games goalkeepers kept a clean sheet.

| Place | Nationality | Player | Fourth Division | FA Cup | League Cup | Football League Trophy | Total |
|---|---|---|---|---|---|---|---|
| 1 | (Scotland) | Tom McAlister | 4 | 0 | 0 | 0 | 4 |
| 1 | (Wales) | Mark Walton | 3 | 0 | 1 | 0 | 4 |
| 3 | (England) | Mark Coombe | 0 | 1 | 0 | 0 | 1 |
| | | TOTALS | 7 | 1 | 1 | 0 | 9 |

=== Player debuts ===
Players making their first-team Colchester United debut in a fully competitive match.

| Position | Nationality | Player | Date | Opponent | Ground | Notes |
|---|---|---|---|---|---|---|
| MF | (England) | Dave Barnett | 27 August 1988 | York City | Layer Road | |
| FB | (England) | Steve Cartwright | 27 August 1988 | York City | Layer Road | |
| FB | (England) | Dave Swindlehurst | 27 August 1988 | York City | Layer Road | |
| FB | (England) | Kevin Bedford | 2 September 1988 | Tranmere Rovers | Prenton Park | |
| WG | (England) | Gary Bennett | 21 October 1988 | Cambridge United | Layer Road | |
| MF | (England) | Tony Kelly | 25 October 1988 | Rotherham United | Millmoor | |
| GK | (England) | Mark Coombe | 11 November 1988 | Torquay United | Layer Road | |
| WG | (England) | Ian Allinson | 16 December 1988 | Rochdale | Spotland Stadium | (Note: Second debut for the club) |
| FB | (England) | Phil Coleman | 20 December 1988 | Southend United | Layer Road | |
| FB | (England) | Rodney Rooke | 20 December 1988 | Southend United | Layer Road | |
| MF | (England) | Les Taylor | 13 January 1989 | Tranmere Rovers | Layer Road | |
| GK | (Scotland) | Tom McAlister | 4 February 1989 | Scarborough | Athletic Ground | |
| WG | (Republic of Ireland) | Paul McGee | 10 February 1989 | Burnley | Layer Road | |
| FW | (England) | John Warner | 18 February 1989 | Scunthorpe United | Glanford Park | |
| FB | (England) | Clive Stafford | 5 March 1989 | Cambridge United | Abbey Stadium | |
| FB | (Scotland) | Robert Scott | 24 March 1989 | Grimsby Town | Layer Road | |
| CB | (England) | John Pollard | 5 May 1989 | Exeter City | Layer Road | |

== See also ==
- List of Colchester United F.C. seasons
