= Andrew Stevenson (disambiguation) =

Andrew Stevenson (1784–1857) was an American politician.

Andrew or Andy Stevenson may also refer to:

- Andrew Stevenson (rugby union) (1897–1968), Scotland prop from Glasgow
- Andrew Stevenson (rower) (born 1957), New Zealand rower
- Andy Stevenson (motorsport) (born 1967), British Formula One team manager
- Andy Stevenson (footballer) (born 1967), English defender and midfielder
- Andrew Stevenson (baseball) (born 1994), American outfielder who also plays for Japan

== See also ==
- Andrew Stephenson (born 1981), British Conservative Party politician
- Andrew Stevens (born 1955), American film producer, director and actor
- Andrew F. Stevens (1866–1951), American banker and politician in Pennsylvania
- Andrew Stephens, Australian rules football umpire
