= John Pollard (footballer) =

English footballer

Personal information
- Full name: Kelly John Pollard
- Date of birth: 17 November 1971 (age 54)
- Place of birth: Chelmsford, England
- Height: 5 ft 11 in (1.80 m)
- Position: Defender

Youth career
- Witham Town
- Colchester United

Senior career*
Years	Team	Apps	(Gls)
1988–1991	Colchester United	9	(1)
1991	→ Fisher Athletic (loan)	10	(0)
	Bury Town	11	(0)
	Heybridge Swifts	371	(16)
1998–2000	St Albans City	63	(9)
2000–2005	Heybridge Swifts	129	(9)
2005–2007	AFC Sudbury	50	(4)
2007	Tiptree United	20	(1)
	Halstead Town	30	(5)
Total		692	(46)
- * Club domestic league appearances and goals

Kelly John Pollard (born 17 November 1971) is an English former footballer who played in the Football League as a defender for Colchester United.

== Career ==
Born in Chelmsford, Pollard began his career with Witham Town before signing to Colchester United's youth team. He broke into the first-team picture at Layer Road early while still playing at youth level in the penultimate game of the 1988–89 season, coming on as a replacement for Mark Radford in a must-win game against Exeter City on 5 May 1989 to ensure league safety. He scored the third goal in the 83rd minute in a thumping 4–0 win, proving to be his only professional goal.

Pollard made 9 Football League appearances for the U's between his debut and the club's relegation from the Fourth Division in 1990, failing to play any Conference games for the club. He made his final appearance in a Conference League Cup 2–0 defeat to Sutton United on 26 February 1991 at Gander Green Lane. Following this, he was sent out on loan alongside teammate Steve Restarick to Fisher Athletic in March 1991.

Colchester released Pollard in the summer of 1991, as he went on to play for a number of non-league clubs including Bury Town and Heybridge Swifts, where in two spells he became the club's record appearance holder with over 550 starts. He separated his spells at Heybridge with a two-year stint at St Albans City, making 93 appearances and scoring nine times, later playing for AFC Sudbury between 2005 and 2007 and briefly Tiptree United before a move to Halstead Town in the summer of 2007. While with Halstead, he became player-assistant manager. Pollard then returned to management in the summer 2015, joining Coggeshall Town being appointed as assistant manager, achieving back to back promotions from the Essex Border League into the Eastern Counties League Premier Division. Pollards first season in the Thurlow Premier division was followed with being crowned champions to the bostik north.
