= Joanna Shields, Baroness Shields =

British businesswoman and politician (born 1962)

The Right Honourable The Baroness Shields OBE
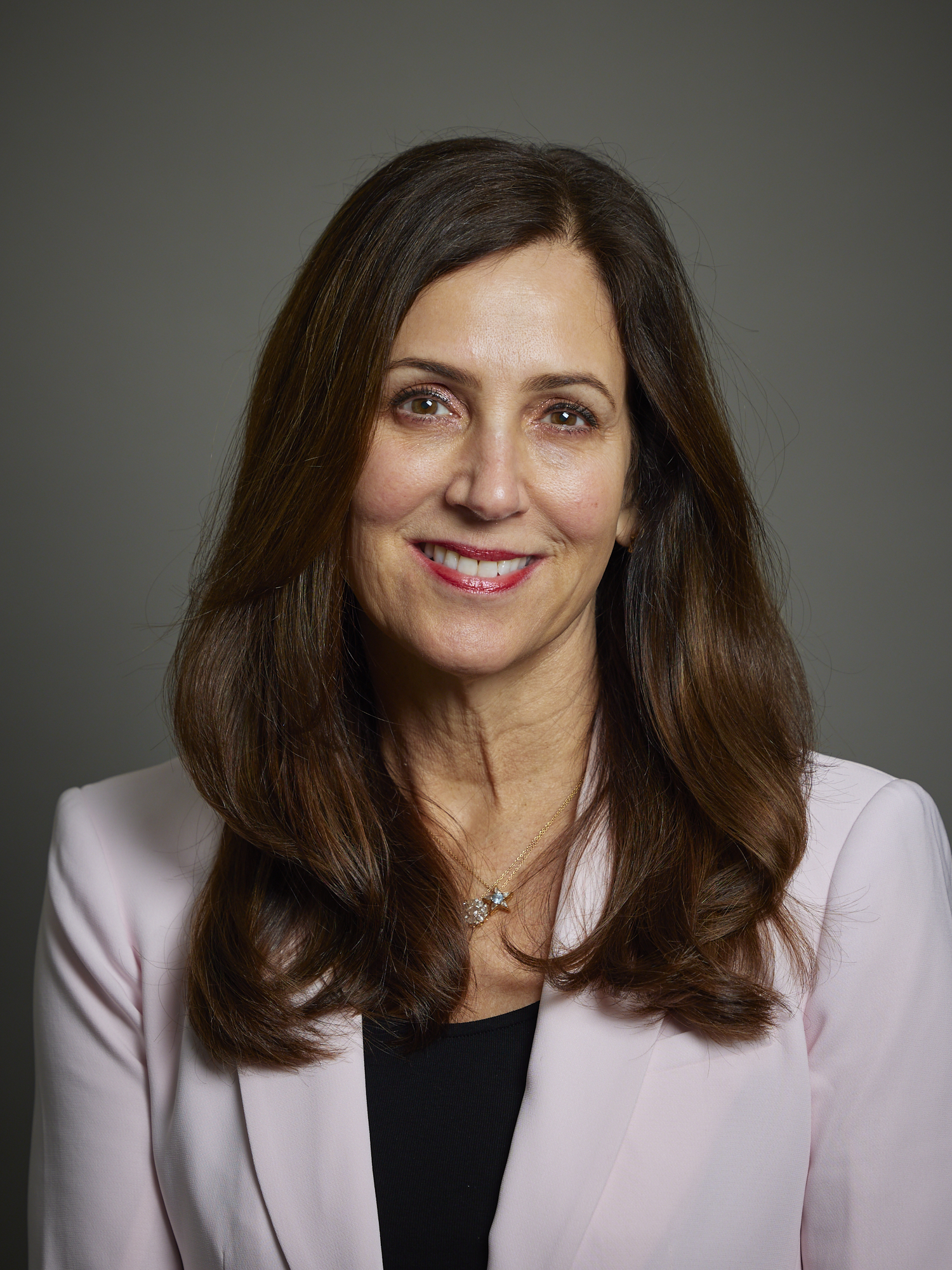
- Official portrait, 2024

Prime Minister’s Special Representative on Internet Crime and Harms
- In office December 2016 – February 2018
- Prime Minister: Theresa May

Minister for Internet Safety and Security
- In office December 2016 – June 2017
- Prime Minister: Theresa May

Parliamentary Under-Secretary of State for Internet Safety and Security at the Home Office
- In office December 2015 – June 2017
- Prime Minister: David Cameron; Theresa May

Parliamentary Under-Secretary of State for Internet Safety and Security at the Department for Digital, Culture, Media and Sport
- In office May 2015 – December 2016
- Prime Minister: David Cameron; Theresa May

Prime Minister’s Adviser on the Digital Economy
- In office June 2014 – May 2015
- Prime Minister: David Cameron

Member of the House of Lords
- Lord Temporal
- Life peerage 16 September 2014

Personal details
- Born: 12 July 1962 (age 64) St. Marys, Pennsylvania, U.S.
- Party: Conservative
- Spouse: Andy Stevenson
- Children: 1
- Education: The Pennsylvania State University 1984, Bachelor of Science. The George Washington University 1987, Master of Business Administration; and, Doctorate in Public Service, Honoris Causa, May 2016
- Occupation: Technology industry executive, Former UK Minister for Internet Safety & Security, and Founder of www.weprotect.org
- Known for: Digital industry pioneer, entrepreneur and tech industry executive
- Website: www.joannashields.com

Joanna Shields, Baroness Shields, OBE (born 12 July 1962) is an American–British technology executive and member of the House of Lords. She was made a Life Peer in 2014 and served as the United Kingdom’s first Minister for Internet Safety and Security under Prime Ministers David Cameron and Theresa May.

== Early life and education ==
Shields was born in 1962 in St. Marys, Pennsylvania, and was the second of five children. She earned an MBA from George Washington University.

== Career history ==
In 1989 Shields joined Electronics for Imaging (Efi) as a product manager and later was appointed as Vice President of Production Systems. She left in 1997 to become CEO at Veon, which she later sold to Phillips. Shields then moved to London to run RealNetworks EMEA. Subsequently, she was appointed as the director of EMEA Syndication & Partnerships for Google.

In late 2006 Shields was approached by Benchmark Capital to step in as CEO of the social networking startup Bebo. At Bebo, Shields introduced Open Media, opening Bebo's platform for media companies to reach its 50M user base and enabling media owners to monetise their content, and Bebo Originals, a series of original online shows. The first Bebo Original KateModern was nominated for two BAFTA awards. She founded an organization called WeProtect in 2014, focused on preventing child sexual exploitation online.

After engineering Bebo's acquisition for $850m by Aol in May 2008, Shields briefly relocated to New York City to head Aol's newly created People Networks, overseeing the company's social and communications assets including AIM, Aol Instant Messenger and ICQ. Bebo's development continued under Shields with the release of Timeline in 2009, the first social network to organise and represent life events in a linear way. Timeline eventually became standard on social networks when Facebook released the feature in 2012.

In 2009 Shields was recruited by former Google colleague Sheryl Sandberg to run Facebook in Europe, Middle East & Africa as VP & managing director.

In May 2018, Shields was announced as the Group CEO of BenevolentAI, a London-based medical startup. She stepped down from that role in September 2023.

Following her departure from BenevolentAI, Shields founded Precognition, an advisory firm focused on AI strategy and policy for governments and corporate leadership. She currently serves as the Executive Chair of the Responsible AI Future Foundation and chairs the OpenAge Initiative.

In May 2026, Shields served as a key partner in launching the "Faith-AI Covenant," an initiative organized by the Interfaith Alliance for Safer Communities. The project brings tech companies, including OpenAI and Anthropic, together with global faith leaders to establish moral and ethical frameworks for artificial intelligence development.

== Government work ==
In October 2012 Shields was named the UK's Ambassador for Digital Industries. She was Chair and CEO of Tech City from January 2013 to May 2015. She helped create Future Fifty, a programme which was launched by the Chancellor George Osborne in April 2013.

Shields was appointed OBE in the 2014 New Year Honours List for "services to digital industries and voluntary service to young people". After being nominated as a working peeress in August 2014, Shields was elevated to the peerage on 16 September 2014 taking the title Baroness Shields, of Maida Vale in the City of Westminster.

In May 2015, Shields was appointed Minister for Internet Safety and Security by Prime Minister David Cameron, serving as Parliamentary Under-Secretary of State at the Department for Culture, Media and Sport. She was reappointed to the same ministerial position by Prime Minister Theresa May in July 2016, continuing her work at the Home Office until June 2017.

In December 2016, Shields was appointed as the Prime Minister's Special Representative on Internet Crime and Harms, focusing on tackling online child sexual abuse, exploitation, and extremist content. She served in this role until February 2018.

== Personal life ==
She graduated as BS from Penn State University, where she was a member of Chi Omega sorority, and did her post-grad studies as MBA from George Washington University. Shields is married to Andy Stevenson, Sporting Director of the Aston Martin Aramco F1 Team racing team.

== Honours and awards ==
- Life Baroness
- Officer of the Order of the British Empire.
