= Steve Cookson =

Steve Cookson may refer to:

- Steve Cookson (footballer)
- Steve Cookson (politician)
