= John McGinley =

John McGinley may refer to:

- John C. McGinley (born 1959), American actor
- John McGinley (footballer) (born 1959), former English footballer
- John McGinley, the mayor of County Kildare and secretary of the Labour Party

== See also ==
- John McGinlay (born 1964), former Scottish footballer
