= Dave Barnett (footballer) =

English footballer (born 1967)

Personal information
- Full name: David Kwame Barnett
- Date of birth: 16 April 1967 (age 59)
- Place of birth: Birmingham, England
- Height: 6 ft 0 in (1.83 m)
- Position: Defender

Youth career
- 1983–1985: Wolverhampton Wanderers

Senior career*
Years	Team	Apps	(Gls)
1985–1986	Boldmere St. Michaels		
1986–1987	Alvechurch		
1987–1988	Windsor & Eton		
1988–1989	Colchester United	20	(0)
1989	Edmonton Brick Men	18	(2)
1989–1990	West Bromwich Albion	0	(0)
1990	Walsall	5	(0)
1990–1992	Kidderminster Harriers	39	(4)
1992–1994	Barnet	59	(3)
1993	→ Birmingham City (loan)	2	(0)
1994–1997	Birmingham City	44	(0)
1997–1998	Dunfermline Athletic	21	(1)
1998	→ Port Vale (loan)	9	(1)
1998–1999	Port Vale	27	(0)
1999–2000	Lincoln City	22	(3)
2000	→ Forest Green Rovers (loan)	3	(0)
2001	Halesowen Town		
2002	Moor Green	5	(0)
2009–2010	Romulus		
Total		274	(14)

Managerial career
- 2010–2015: Romulus
- * Club domestic league appearances and goals

David Kwame Barnett (born 16 April 1967) is an English former football player and coach who played as a defender in the Football League for Colchester United, Walsall, Barnet, Birmingham City, Port Vale and Lincoln City. He also represented Dunfermline Athletic in the Scottish Premier League and Edmonton Brick Men in the Canadian Soccer League. He made more than 200 appearances for nearly 20 clubs during his career. He later coached non-League Romulus.

== Playing career ==
Born in Birmingham, Barnett began his youth career at Wolverhampton Wanderers but was released without making an appearance. He then joined non-league sides Boldmere St. Michaels and then Alvechurch before being picked up by Windsor & Eton. From here, he was signed by Colchester United manager Roger Brown on 27 August 1988. He was sent off on his professional debut in the opening-day fixture of the 1988–89 season, becoming only the second U's player after Nigel Crouch to be dismissed on their maiden appearance for the club. After serving his suspension, Barnett was again sent off in only his seventh league game during a 2–1 home defeat to Scunthorpe United on 8 October 1988.

His disciplinary record earned him the nickname "Psycho" with the Colchester fans. His time at the club came to an abrupt end on 24 February 1989 when manager Jock Wallace watched him commit an off the ball indiscretion during a reserve team game. After his Colchester exit, Barnett moved to Canada to play for Canadian Soccer League club Edmonton Brick Men where he played alongside Justin Fashanu. He scored two goals in 18 appearances. Barnett returned to England in October 1989 to sign for West Bromwich Albion on a non-contract basis. However, he failed to make a first-team appearance for the Baggies. He then moved to Walsall for the early part of the 1990–91 season before returning to non-league football with Kidderminster Harriers. Here, he made 39 Conference appearances and helped the club to Wembley for the 1991 FA Trophy final, in which they finished runners-up to Wycombe Wanderers.

Barnett was signed by Barry Fry at Barnet for a £17,000 fee in February 1992. He aided the club to promotion from the Third Division in 1992–93. As the Bee's struggled in the higher tier, Barnett was loaned to his hometown club Birmingham City in December 1993 where he played twice, before returning to Barnet who were subsequently relegated. While at Underhill, Barnett made 59 league appearances and scored three goals.

Birmingham City eventually signed Barnett permanently in February 1994, once again teaming up with Barry Fry, who had been appointed manager at St Andrew's. Signing for £150,000, the club were relegated to the Second Division in 1994, but Barnett helped the club gain immediate promotion back to the First Division as a virtual ever-present feature of the first-team. He also made another Wembley appearance, this time in the 1995 Football League Trophy final, which City won 1–0 over Carlisle United with a golden goal from Paul Tait. However, he did not feature in the 1995–96 season and played just six games in 1996–97 under new manager Trevor Francis, and so left for Dunfermline Athletic in July 1997.

Barnett featured 21 times for Dunfermline in the Scottish Premier Division during the 1997–98 season, scoring once to help Bert Paton's side retain their top-flight status. However, before the season was up, Barnett made a deadline day loan move to Port Vale, where he made nine appearances and scored one goal. During the close season, the move back to England was made permanent as he made 27 further appearances for Vale. His final professional transfer came following a successful trial spell at Lincoln City in the summer of 1999, where he made 22 league appearances and netted three times. While with Lincoln, Barnett had a three-game loan spell in the Conference with Forest Green Rovers. Notified by Lincoln that he would be given a free transfer at the end of the 1999–2000 season, Barnett ended up with an injury before his release and in turn announced his retirement.

== International career ==
In 2000, Barnett was due to play international football for the Cayman Islands, but a Football Association veto blocked the efforts of nations such as the Cayman Islands acquiring English players.

== Coaching career ==
After finishing his professional playing career, Barnett joined the Birmingham City Academy as a part-time coach before joining Halesowen Town as first-team coach in March 2001. He then took up his Academy role at Birmingham in a full-time capacity. Barnett would later turn out for Moor Green, where he made five appearances in 2002.

Following his return from the United States in the summer of 2009, Barnett signed for Romulus in August and was subsequently appointed first-team coach at the club in February 2010 after initially refusing to be involved in coaching at the club having obtained a UEFA 'A' Licence. He agreed to continue his role at the club for the 2010–11 season, however, his disciplinary issues continued after being given a six-match suspension and a £100 fine by the FA following four breaches of FA Rule E3 - language and/or behaviour amounting to improper conduct - following a match with Belper Town in November 2012. He stepped down as manager in January after deciding to concentrate on activities outside football.

== Personal life ==
His son, Ty Barnett, is also a professional footballer.

== Career statistics ==
Appearances and goals by club, season and competition
Club	Season	League			FA Cup		Other		Total	
Club	Season	Division	Apps	Goals	Apps	Goals	Apps	Goals	Apps	Goals
Colchester United	1988–89	Fourth Division	20	0	4	0	5	0	29	0
Edmonton Brick Men	1989	Canadian Soccer League	18	2	—		—		18	2
West Bromwich Albion	1989–90	Second Division	0	0	0	0	0	0	0	0
Walsall	1990–91	Fourth Division	5	0	0	0	2	0	7	0
Barnet	1991–92	Fourth Division	4	0	0	0	1	0	5	0
Barnet	1992–93	Third Division	36	2	1	0	4	0	41	2
Barnet	1993–94	Second Division	15	1	2	0	6	0	23	1
Barnet	1994–95	Second Division	4	0	0	0	0	0	4	0
Barnet	Total		59	3	3	0	11	0	73	3
Birmingham City	1993–94	First Division	9	0	0	0	0	0	9	0
Birmingham City	1994–95	Second Division	31	0	5	0	9	0	45	0
Birmingham City	1995–96	First Division	0	0	0	0	0	0	0	0
Birmingham City	1996–97	First Division	6	0	0	0	0	0	6	0
Birmingham City	Total		46	0	5	0	9	0	60	0
Dunfermline Athletic	1997–98	Scottish Premier Division	21	1	2	0	3	0	26	1
Port Vale	1997–98	First Division	9	1	0	0	0	0	9	1
Port Vale	1998–99	First Division	27	0	1	0	0	0	28	0
Port Vale	Total		36	1	1	0	0	0	37	1
Lincoln City	1999–2000	Third Division	22	3	3	1	2	0	27	4
Forest Green Rovers (loan)	1999–2000	Conference	3	0	0	0	0	0	3	0
Career total			230	10	18	1	32		280	11

== Honours ==
Kidderminster Harriers

- FA Trophy runner-up: 1990–91

Birmingham City

- Football League Second Division: 1994–95
- Football League Trophy: 1994–95
