= Rodney Rooke =

English footballer (born 1970)

Personal information
- Full name: Rodney Rooke
- Date of birth: 7 April 1970 (age 56)
- Place of birth: Orsett, England
- Height: 5 ft 5 in (1.65 m)
- Position: Full-back

Youth career
- 1986–1988: Colchester United

Senior career*
| Years | Team | Apps | (Gls) |
| 1988–1990 | Colchester United | 4 | (0) |
| 1989-1991 | Wivenhoe Town | 10 | (1) |
- Chelmsford City
- Dagenham
- Grays Athletic
- Stambridge United
| 1991-1992 | Wivenhoe Town | 10 | (1) |
- * Club domestic league appearances and goals

Rodney Rooke (born 7 April 1970) is an English former footballer who played in the Football League as a full-back for Colchester United and a number of English non-League clubs.

== Career ==
Born in Orsett, Rooke joined the Colchester United Academy in 1986. During his second apprentice year, he was training with an athletic specialist in order to add extra pace to his skill. He did enough to be retained on a non-contract basis for the 1988–89 season, receiving his debut on 20 December 1988 in a 2–1 win over rivals Southend United in the Associate Members Cup.

Rooke failed to add to his solitary appearance during the season, generally confined to the reserve team. In pre-season for the 1989–90 season during a tour of Scotland, he displaced regular left-back Clive Stafford, impressing enough to earn him a run in the first-team during the opening games of the league season. However, after the defence leaked a number of goals, the inexperienced Rooke was one of the first players to be replaced. He made his final appearance for the club on 7 October 1989 in a heavy 4–0 away defeat to Aldershot. He made a total of four Football League appearances for the U's.

Shortly after the turn of the year, Rooke left Colchester for pastures new, joining neighbours Wivenhoe Town before signing with Chelmsford City, Dagenham, Grays Athletic and Stambridge United until he later made a return to Wivenhoe.
