= Stephen Osborne =

Stephen, Steven or Steve Osborne may refer to:

- Stephen Osborne (writer) (born 1947), Canadian writer and editor of Geist magazine
- Steven Osborne (pianist) (born 1971), British pianist
- Steve Osborne (born 1963), English music producer
- Stephen Osborne (athlete) (born 1963), Paralympic athlete from England
- Steve Osborne (footballer) (born 1969), English footballer
