= Steve Cartwright (footballer) =

English footballer

Personal information
- Full name: Stephen Raymond Cartwright
- Date of birth: 8 January 1965 (age 61)
- Place of birth: Tamworth, England
- Position: Defender

Youth career
- Gillway Boys

Senior career*
Years	Team	Apps	(Gls)
- Picadilly
- Tamworth
1988	Colchester United	10	(0)
- Tamworth
- Atherstone United
Total		10	(0)
- * Club domestic league appearances and goals

Stephen Raymond Cartwright (born 8 January 1965) is an English former footballer who played as a defender in the Football League for Colchester United.

== Career ==
Born in Tamworth, Cartwright played for his hometown club, Tamworth, in two stints, both coming either side of a brief spell with Colchester United. Cartwright joined Colchester in the summer of 1988, making his debut on 27 August of the same year in a 1–0 home victory over York City. He made ten league appearances in total for the U's and appeared in his final game just under two months later, in a record Football League defeat for Colchester as they were defeated 8–0 at Leyton Orient. The result cost manager Roger Brown his job and Cartwright never appeared for Colchester again, returning to Tamworth for the remained of the 1988–89 season.

On his return to Tamworth, he aided the club to the final of the FA Vase, playing Sudbury Town at Wembley on 7 May 1989. The match ended in a 1–1 draw, with Tamworth winning the replay the following Wednesday by 3–0 at London Road, Peterborough. Following his second spell with Tamworth, he later joined Atherstone United.

Steve 'The Cat' Cartwright is due to dust off his old size nines, to be the star performer in a charity match organised by Miller Construction. Captaining his PCE team, Steve (ex Tamworth, played at Wembley) is expected to shine at the back in his newly designed hi-vis kit.

== Personal life ==
Cartwright remained in Tamworth after retiring, spending time watching his son Alfie play football for Coton Green juniors.

== Honours ==
Tamworth

- 1988–89 FA Vase winner

In 2000 he was voted Tamworth FC Greatest Player in a poll organised by the club

All honours referenced by:
