= Marcelle Bruce =

American former soccer player

Personal information
- Full name: Marcelle Eugene Bruce
- Date of birth: 15 March 1971 (age 55)
- Place of birth: Detroit, Michigan, United States
- Height: 5 ft 10 in (1.78 m)
- Position: Defender

Youth career
- Colchester United

Senior career*
Years	Team	Apps	(Gls)
1989–1991	Colchester United	33	(1)
- Baldock Town
- Hemel Hempstead Town
Total		33	(1)
- * Club domestic league appearances and goals

Marcelle Eugene Bruce (born 15 March 1971) is an American former soccer player who played as a defender in the Football League for Colchester United.

== Career ==
Born in Detroit, Michigan, Bruce began his career with English Football League club Colchester United. He made his debut for the first-team aged 18 in a 2–1 home defeat to Cambridge United on 10 November 1989. He scored his only professional goal for the club and the only goal of the game in a victory over Grimsby Town on 20 February 1990. Bruce made 29 league appearances for Colchester in the 1989–90 season, but could not help the club avoid relegation from the Football League to the Football Conference. He made four appearances in the Conference, and played his final game for the U's in a 2–0 Conference League Cup defeat to Sutton United on 26 February 1991.

Following his exit from Colchester, Bruce teamed up with non-league outfits Baldock Town and Hemel Hempstead Town.
