= Ty Barnett (footballer) =

English footballer

Personal information
- Full name: Ty Kimoni Barnett
- Date of birth: 3 August 2005 (age 21)
- Place of birth: Charlotte, North Carolina, United States
- Height: 1.85 m (6 ft 1 in)
- Position: Left winger

Team information
- Current team: Crown Legacy FC
- Number: 77

Youth career
- -2019: Birmingham City
- 2019–2023: Wolverhampton Wanderers

Senior career*
Years	Team	Apps	(Gls)
2023–2026	Wolverhampton Wanderers	0	(0)
2026–	Crown Legacy FC	0	(0)

International career^{‡}
2020	England U15	2	(1)
- * Club domestic league appearances and goals as of 00:15, 22 December 2023 (UTC) ‡ National team caps and goals as of 17:57, 21 September 2026 (UTC)

Ty Kimoni Barnett (born August 3, 2005) is a footballer who plays as a left winger for MLS Next Pro side Crown Legacy FC. Born in the United States, he is a former youth international for England.

== Early life ==
Born in Charlotte, North Carolina and raised in Birmingham, England, he attended King Edward VI Handsworth Grammar School for Boys.

== Career ==
Barnett was in the academy at Birmingham City before he joined Wolves at the age of 13 years-old in 2019. He signed his first professional contract with Wolves in July 2022. Although his progress was hampered by injury, he represented Wolves U19 at the Premier League Next Generation Cup in India in May 2023. In August 2023, he signed a new three-year contract with the club. On December 24, 2023, he was included in the Wolves match-day team, named as a substitute for a Premier League clash against Chelsea.

== International career ==
Barnett is a former youth international for England, having played twice for the England U15s in 2020.

== Style of play ==
Barnett is described as a versatile midfield player who can play in higher areas as an attacking midfield player or in deeper areas, if required.

== Personal life ==
He is the son of former professional English footballer Dave Barnett. He is of Trinidadian descent through his mother Lisa.
