= Andy Stevenson (motorsport) =

British mechanic

- Born: 20 September 1967 (age 58)
- Citizenship: British
- Employer: Aston Martin F1 Team
- Title: Sporting Director

Andy Stevenson (born 20 September 1967) is a British Formula One team manager. He is currently the Sporting Director of the Aston Martin Formula One team. He is the second husband of the Baroness Shields.

== Career ==
After success in Formula 3 and Formula 3000 with Eddie Jordan Racing, in the early 1990s Stevenson rose through the ranks after Jordan entered F1. Having been the Chief Mechanic, he took on the responsibilities of Sporting Director in 2005.

In his current role, Stevenson represents the team in discussions with the FIA and the Sporting Working Group, as well as managing the garage operations.
