= John Green (footballer, born 1958) =

English footballer

Personal information
- Full name: John Richard Green
- Date of birth: 7 March 1958 (age 68)
- Place of birth: Rotherham, England
- Height: 5 ft 11 in (1.80 m)
- Position: Centre back

Youth career
- Rotherham United

Senior career*
Years	Team	Apps	(Gls)
1976–1983	Rotherham United	248	(8)
1983–1985	Scunthorpe United	100	(4)
1985–1986	Darlington	45	(2)
1986–1989	Rotherham United	85	(3)
Total		478	(17)
- * Club domestic league appearances and goals

John Richard Green (born 7 March 1958) is a former footballer who scored 17 goals from 478 appearances in the Football League playing as a centre back for Rotherham United (two spells), Scunthorpe United and Darlington in the 1970s and 1980s.

== Honours ==
Rotherham United

- Football League Fourth Division: 1988–89
