= Steve Hetzke =

English footballer

Personal information
- Full name: Stephen Edward Richard Hetzke
- Date of birth: 3 June 1955 (age 71)
- Place of birth: Marlborough, England
- Height: 6 ft 2 in (1.88 m)
- Position: Defender

Senior career*
Years	Team	Apps	(Gls)
1971–1982	Reading	261	(23)
1976	→ Vancouver Whitecaps (loan)	18	(0)
1982–1986	Blackpool	140	(18)
1986–1987	Sunderland	31	(0)
1987–1988	Chester City	14	(0)
1988–1989	Colchester United	29	(2)
Total		475	(43)
- * Club domestic league appearances and goals

Stephen Edward Richard Hetzke (born 3 June 1955) is an English former professional footballer. He played as a defender.

== Career ==
Hetzke began his career with Reading, where he twice won promotion from Division Four, in 1976, and in 1979 as champions. Hetzke broke the record for the youngest player to appear in a competitive match for Reading, aged 16 years and 191 days. He also scored the first goal of the 1980/81 season, when a League Cup match at Northampton was brought forward to the Friday and he put Reading ahead after seven minutes.

He later received a testimonial match after leaving for Blackpool in July 1982 for a £12,500 fee, which was settled by a tribunal.

He made his debut for Blackpool in the opening league game of the 1982–83 campaign, a 2–1 defeat at Mansfield Town on 28 August 1982. He went on to make a further 42 league appearances that season, scoring twice.

He appeared in all but one of Blackpool's 46 league games in 1983–84, scoring seven goals. Two of these were game-winning penalties in single-goal victories – firstly against Torquay United at Bloomfield Road on 17 December 1983, and then ten days later against Hartlepool United at the same venue.

In 1984–85, Hetzke, who by now was the club's captain, made 30 league appearances and scored five goals, including both goals in a 2–0 victory at Torquay United on 15 December 1984. Blackpool won promotion to Division Three at the end of the season.

Hetzke's final season at Blackpool, 1985–86, saw him make 23 league appearances and score four goals. His final appearance for the club occurred on 22 February 1986, in a single-goal defeat at Cardiff City.

In March 1986 Hetzke joined Sunderland, although after relegation to Division Three in 1986–87 he moved on to Chester City. He made his Chester debut in a 5–0 home defeat to Northampton Town at the start of 1987–88 and added just thirteen more league appearances before joining Colchester United in a £10,000 transfer in February 1988.

Hetzke finished his league career at the Layer Road club at the end of the 1988–89 season.

== Honours ==
Reading

- Division Four champions: 1979-80.
- Division Four promotion as third-placed team: 1975-76.

Blackpool

- Division Four promotion as runners-up: 1984-85.
