= Andy Marriott =

Football goalkeeper (born 1970)

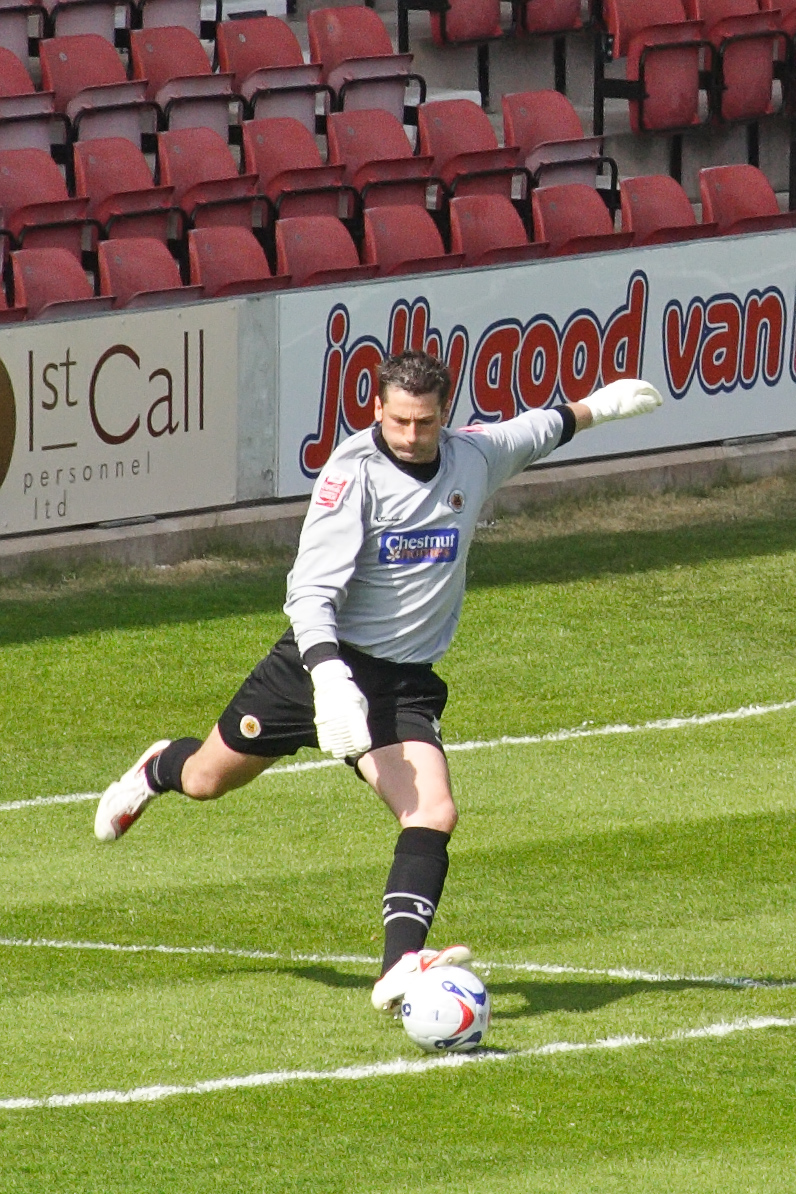

Personal information
- Full name: Andrew Marriott
- Date of birth: 11 October 1970 (age 56)
- Place of birth: Sutton-in-Ashfield, England
- Position: Goalkeeper

Youth career
- 1987–1988: Arsenal

Senior career*
Years	Team	Apps	(Gls)
1988–1989	Arsenal	0	(0)
1989–1993	Nottingham Forest	11	(0)
1989	→ West Bromwich Albion (loan)	3	(0)
1989	→ Blackburn Rovers (loan)	2	(0)
1990	→ Colchester United (loan)	10	(0)
1991	→ Burnley (loan)	15	(0)
1993–1998	Wrexham	255	(0)
1998	→ Sunderland (loan)	0	(0)
1998–2001	Sunderland	2	(0)
2001	→ Wigan Athletic (loan)	0	(0)
2001	→ Barnsley (loan)	0	(0)
2001–2003	Barnsley	54	(0)
2003	Birmingham City	1	(0)
2003–2004	S.C. Beira-Mar	24	(0)
2004	Coventry City	0	(0)
2004	Colchester United	0	(0)
2004–2005	Bury	19	(0)
2005–2006	Torquay United	57	(0)
2006–2007	Boston United	46	(0)
2007–2011	Exeter City	52	(0)
Total		551	(0)

International career
1992	England U21	1	(0)
1996–1998	Wales	5	(0)
- * Club domestic league appearances and goals

Andrew Marriott (born 11 October 1970) is an English-born Welsh professional footballer, who played as a goalkeeper. He represented the Welsh national team.

== Football career ==
Marriott was born in Sutton-in-Ashfield. He began his career as a trainee with Arsenal in April 1987, turning professional in October 1988. However, he never made the first team at Highbury, joining Nottingham Forest in June 1989 for a fee of £50,000. He was soon sent out on loan by Brian Clough to gain some first team experience, joining West Bromwich Albion in September 1989. He made his Football League debut with Albion in a 3–1 win at Leicester City on 9 September. Later that season he had loan spells with Blackburn Rovers and Colchester United. He was also loaned out to Burnley in August 1991. Marriott played in the 1992 League Cup Final, which Forest lost 1–0 to Manchester United. After 13 first team games for Forest, he moved to Wrexham, in October 1993, for a fee of £200,000.

He was a regular over the next five years at the Racecourse Ground, playing over 250 times, and winning five Welsh international caps, before joining Sunderland for £200,000 in August 1998. He failed to establish himself at Sunderland however, and was set to join Cardiff City in September 2000. A £300,000 fee had been agreed between the two clubs, but Marriott decided to stay at Sunderland after failing to agree personal terms with Cardiff. A further round of negotiations later that month failed to persuade him to move to South Wales. He joined Wigan Athletic on loan in January 2001. Another loan spell in 2000–01, this time at Barnsley, led to a permanent move on a free transfer at the end of the season. He acted as the club's PFA representative during his time at Oakwell.

In March 2003 he joined Birmingham City for a nominal fee, as goalkeeping cover after Nico Vaesen suffered injured knee ligaments. He left at the end of the season after just one Premiership appearance, a 2–1 away defeat against Tottenham Hotspur. Seven minutes into his Blues debut, Marriott collected a tame delivery into the box and dropped the ball at his feet to clear. However, he failed to see behind him Robbie Keane, who stole the ball and rolled it into the net. The goal was named as the Goal of the Week on the BBC Sport website, which described it as "the cheekiest goal of the season" and "one of the goalkeeping clangers of the season". Birmingham manager Steve Bruce said that Marriott will be "haunted forever" by the mistake.

In August 2004 he joined Coventry City on a month-to-month deal, but was not kept on and in September had a trial with Oldham Athletic. He moved to Colchester United on a one-month deal in October 2004, as cover for Aidan Davison. The following month he signed an 18-month contract with Bury. In March 2005 he joined Torquay United, becoming the sixth keeper the club had used that season. He saved two spot-kicks in an FA Cup penalty shootout against Harrogate Town, before converting the winning penalty himself. At the end of the 2005–06 he was offered a new contract at Torquay, but he turned it down, instead opting to sign for Boston United in June. A year later, following Boston's double demotion to the Conference North, he returned to Devon, joining Exeter City.

== Player/Admin roles ==
As well as being a registered player, Marriott held the role of general manager at Exeter City.

On 7 December 2010 it was announced that Marriott would join Premier League side West Bromwich Albion in the new year to become Assistant Sporting/Technical Director.

Marriott left this post in 2011 to join the Mercedes Formula One venture. There has been widespread speculation that he is in the frame to return to the Hawthorns and succeed his former mentor, Dan Ashworth, as Sporting and Technical Director at West Bromwich Albion.

== Honours ==
Burnley

- Football League Fourth Division: 1991–92

Nottingham Forest

- Full Members' Cup: 1991–92
- Football League Cup runner-up: 1991–92

Wrexham

- Welsh Cup: 1995
