= Billy Gilbert (footballer) =

English footballer

Personal information
- Full name: William Albert Gilbert
- Date of birth: 10 November 1959 (age 66)
- Place of birth: Lewisham, London, England
- Height: 5 ft 11 in (1.80 m)
- Position: Defender

Youth career
- –: Crystal Palace

Senior career*
Years	Team	Apps	(Gls)
1977–1984	Crystal Palace	237	(3)
1984–1989	Portsmouth	140	(0)
1989–1990	Colchester United	27	(0)
1990–1991	Maidstone United	4	(0)
–	Havant Town		
–	Whyteleafe		
1992-1998	Waterlooville		
1998–2000	Havant & Waterlooville	14	(0)

International career
1975	England Schoolboys	9	(1)
1979–1981	England U21	11	(0)

Managerial career
- 1992–1998: Waterlooville (player-manager)
- 1998–2000: Havant & Waterlooville (player-manager)
- * Club domestic league appearances and goals

William Albert Gilbert (born 10 November 1959) is an English former footballer, born in Lewisham, London, who made more than 400 appearances in the Football League playing as a defender for Crystal Palace, Portsmouth, Colchester United and Maidstone United. He won 11 caps for England at under-21 level.

== Career ==
Gilbert began his career at Terry Venables' Crystal Palace, winning the FA Youth Cup twice as part of the so-called "Team of the Eighties" as well as being a key fixture in the side that won promotion to the First Division. Gilbert remained with Palace after their relegation back to the Second Division, winning the 1984 Player of the Year award in his final season at Selhurst Park.

Gilbert then moved to Portsmouth, spending five years at Fratton Park before moving on again to Colchester United. He also spent a season at Maidstone United, before playing non-league football for Havant Town, Whyteleafe and Waterlooville. He managed Waterlooville for a time, then after their merger with Havant Town to form Havant & Waterlooville, he became player-manager of the merged club, leading them to the Southern League Southern Division title in his first season, before departing in 2000.

== Honours ==
=== Club ===
Crystal Palace

- Football League Second Division Winner (1): 1978–79
- FA Youth Cup Winner (2): 1976–77, 1977–78

Portsmouth

- Football League Second Division Runner-up (1): 1986–87

=== Individual ===
- PFA Team of the Year (1): 1984–85
- Crystal Palace Player of the Year (1): 1984
