= Kevin Bedford =

English footballer

Personal information
- Full name: Kevin Edward Bedford
- Date of birth: 26 December 1968 (age 57)
- Place of birth: Carshalton, London, England
- Position: Left back

Senior career*
Years	Team	Apps	(Gls)
1986–1988	Wimbledon	4	(0)
1988	→ Aldershot (loan)	16	(0)
1988–1989	Colchester United	26	(0)
Total		46	(0)
- * Club domestic league appearances and goals

Kevin Edward Bedford (born 26 December 1968) in Carshalton, London, is an English retired professional footballer who played as a left back for Wimbledon, Aldershot and Colchester United in the Football League.
