= Mark Coombe =

English footballer

Personal information
- Full name: Mark Andrew Coombe
- Date of birth: 17 September 1968 (age 58)
- Place of birth: Torquay, England
- Position: Goalkeeper

Youth career
- Bournemouth

Senior career*
Years	Team	Apps	(Gls)
1987–1988	Bristol City	0	(0)
1988	Colchester United	3	(0)
1989	Torquay United	8	(0)
1991–1992	Salisbury City		
1992	Dorchester Town		
- Elmore
- Taunton Town
- Exeter City
- Minehead
- Bideford
- * Club domestic league appearances and goals as of 00:32, 12 May 2011

Mark Andrew Coombe (born 17 September 1968) is a former professional footballer who played as a goalkeeper for Football League clubs Colchester United and Torquay United, followed by many non-league teams. In 1992 he moved from Salisbury City to Dorchester Town, both in the Southern League, for a fee of £5,000.
