= Tom McAlister =

Scottish footballer

Personal information
- Full name: Thomas Gerald McAlister
- Date of birth: 10 December 1952 (age 73)
- Place of birth: Clydebank, Scotland
- Height: 6 ft 1 in (1.85 m)
- Position: Goalkeeper

Youth career
- Sheffield United

Senior career*
Years	Team	Apps	(Gls)
1971–1975	Sheffield United	63	(0)
1975–1979	Rotherham United	159	(0)
1979–1980	Blackpool	16	(0)
1980–1981	Swindon Town	1	(0)
1980–1981	→ Bristol Rovers (loan)	13	(0)
1981–1989	West Ham United	85	(0)
1988–1989	→ Colchester United (loan)	20	(0)
- * Club domestic league appearances and goals

Thomas Gerald McAlister (born 10 December 1952) is a Scottish former professional footballer who made more than 350 appearances in the English Football League playing as a goalkeeper.

== Career ==
McAlister is principally remembered for making over 150 league appearances for Rotherham United between 1975 and 1979, and as West Ham's second choice goalkeeper to Phil Parkes throughout the 1980s. He also appeared for Sheffield United, Blackpool and Swindon and also made loan appearances for Bristol Rovers and Colchester.

== Honours ==
=== Club ===
Sheffield United

- Watney Cup Runner-up: 1972–73

=== Individual ===
- PFA Team of the Year: 1976–77
