= Karl Goddard =

English footballer (1967–2023)

Personal information
- Full name: Karl Eric Goddard
- Date of birth: 29 December 1967
- Place of birth: Leeds, England
- Date of death: 25 June 2023 (aged 55)
- Height: 5 ft 6 in (1.68 m)
- Position: Defender

Youth career
- 1984–1986: Manchester United

Senior career*
Years	Team	Apps	(Gls)
1986–1990	Bradford City	73	(0)
1990	→ Exeter City (loan)	1	(0)
1990	→ Colchester United (loan)	16	(1)
1990–1992	Hereford United	9	(1)
1992–1993	Bradford Park Avenue		
Total		99	(2)
- * Club domestic league appearances and goals

Karl Eric Goddard (29 December 1967 – 25 June 2023) was an English footballer who played as a defender for Manchester United, Bradford City, Exeter City (on loan), Colchester United (on loan), Hereford United and Bradford Park Avenue.

Goddard had three children. He died on 25 June 2023, at the age of 55.
