= Robbie Devereux =

English footballer

Personal information
- Date of birth: 31 January 1971 (age 55)
- Place of birth: Great Cornard, England
- Position: Midfielder

Youth career
- Ipswich Town

Senior career*
Years	Team	Apps	(Gls)
1989–1990	Colchester United	2	(0)
1990–1992	Cornard United		
1992	Colchester United	6	(0)
1992–1996	Shelbourne		
1996–1997	Dundalk		
1998–2000	St Patrick's Athletic		
2000	Southport	7	(0)
2000–2002	AFC Sudbury	77	(1)
- * Club domestic league appearances and goals

Robbie Devereux (born 31 January 1971) is an English former professional footballer.

== Biography ==
Born in Great Cornard, Devereux played for the Ipswich Town youth team, but was released by the club. He signed for Colchester United in 1989, but was released the following year after only two league appearances and dropped into non-League to sign for hometown club Cornard United.

In 1992, he briefly returned to Colchester, making six appearances, before signing for Irish club Shelbourne. In Ireland, he also played for Dundalk and St Patrick's Athletic, before returning to England to play for Southport, making seven appearances in the Football Conference. After a trial at Dagenham & Redbridge, he also played for AFC Sudbury, where he ended his career after making 77 appearances for the club. He currently runs a roofing company in the Sudbury area.
