= WeProtect =

Nonprofit global organization

WeProtect Global Alliance
- Formation: 2013
- Type: Non-profit organization
- Purpose: protecting children online
- Region served: Worldwide
- Website: www.weprotect.org

WeProtect Global Alliance (also known as the Alliance) is a global alliance that brings together experts from government, the private sector and civil society to protect children from sexual abuse online.

== History ==
On 22 July 2013, then-Prime Minister David Cameron made a speech regarding the proliferation and accessibility of child abuse images on the Internet and about cracking down on online pornography. The Prime Minister announced the launch of WeProtect in December 2014.

In May 2016, WePROTECT merged with the Global Alliance Against Child Sexual Abuse Online, forming "WeProtect Global Alliance". In July 2016, the WeProtect Global Alliance launched a new Fund to End Violence Against Children at the United Nations to deliver a global program of capacity and capability, with an initial donation of £40 million from the UK government. The Fund is hosted by UNICEF, and the WePROTECT Global Alliance Board are responsible for advising how to prioritize its activities for maximum impact.

In February 2018, the WeProtect Global Alliance launched its first Global Threat Assessment at the Solutions Summit to End Violence Against Children in Sweden. The report analyzed the global risk factors enabling online child sexual exploitation and abuse (CSEA), identifying technological developments such as live streaming and encryption as key challenges. Following this, the Alliance expanded its Model National Response (MNR) efforts, supporting initiatives in over 20 countries through partnerships with the Fund to End Violence Against Children.

In 2021, WeProtect was quoted in The Guardian supporting Apple’s proposed scanning tool to detect child abuse imagery, calling for the swift identification and removal of such content.

By 2023, Iain Drennan was the organization's executive director.

In April 2025, WeProtect Global Alliance was mentioned in a World Economic Forum article discussing international efforts to address online disinformation and child exploitation. Executive Director Iain Drennan stated that safety-by-design principles are important in digital regulation, particularly for protecting minors.
