= John Grace (Irish footballer) =

Irish footballer

Personal information
- Full name: John Michael Grace
- Date of birth: 16 February 1964 (age 62)
- Place of birth: Dublin, Ireland
- Height: 6 ft 2 in (1.88 m)
- Position: Goalkeeper

Senior career*
Years	Team	Apps	(Gls)
- Tolka Rovers
1989–1990	Colchester United	19	(0)
- Kilkenny City
- Crusaders
- Glentoran
- Waterford United
- Monaghan United
Total		19	(0)
- * Club domestic league appearances and goals

John Michael Grace (born 16 February 1964) is an Irish former footballer who played in the Football League as a goalkeeper for Colchester United. He also played in the League of Ireland and the Irish Football League.

== Career ==
Born in Dublin, Grace started playing for amateur club Tolka Rovers as a youth, before earning a move to the Football League with Colchester United, signing alongside fellow Irishman Mark Kinsella. Grace made 19 Football League appearances for the club, making his debut in a 1–1 away draw with Chesterfield on 18 August 1989. His stay in England lasted just five months, and he made his final appearance in a U's shirt on 5 January 1990, a 1–0 home defeat to Stockport County.

Grace returned to Ireland to play for Kilkenny City following his Colchester exit, and later played in Northern Ireland for Crusaders and Glentoran, and once again in the Republic of Ireland for Waterford United and Monaghan United.
