= Roger Hansbury =

English footballer

Personal information
- Full name: Roger Hansbury
- Date of birth: 26 January 1955 (age 71)
- Place of birth: Barnsley, England
- Height: 5 ft 11 in (1.80 m)
- Position: Goalkeeper

Senior career*
Years	Team	Apps	(Gls)
1973–1981	Norwich City	78	(0)
1976	→ Bolton Wanderers (loan)	0	(0)
1977–1978	→ Cambridge United (loan)	11	(0)
1978–1979	→ Orient (loan)	0	(0)
1981–1983	Eastern AA		
1983–1985	Burnley	83	(0)
1985–1986	Cambridge United	37	(0)
1986–1989	Birmingham City	57	(0)
1987–1988	→ Sheffield United (loan)	5	(0)
1988	→ Wolverhampton Wanderers (loan)	3	(0)
1989	→ Colchester United (loan)	4	(0)
1989–1992	Cardiff City	99	(0)
- * Club domestic league appearances and goals

Roger Hansbury (born 26 January 1955) is an English former footballer who played as a goalkeeper. He made 377 appearances in the Football League, and also played in Hong Kong.

Hansbury was born in Barnsley, which was then in the West Riding of Yorkshire. He started his career with Norwich City, for whom he made 78 league appearances between 1974 and 1981, and spent spells on loan at Bolton Wanderers, Cambridge United and Orient. Unable to dislodge Chris Woods or Kevin Keelan from Norwich's starting lineup, he moved to Hong Kong in 1981 to play for Eastern AA. He returned to England in 1983 and played for Burnley, Cambridge United for a second time, Birmingham City, from where he went on loan to Sheffield United, Wolverhampton Wanderers and Colchester United, and finally Cardiff City.

After retiring from football he ran a greetings card shop.
