= Andy Stevenson (footballer) =

English footballer

Personal information
- Full name: Andrew John Stevenson
- Date of birth: 29 September 1967
- Place of birth: Scunthorpe, England
- Height: 6 ft 0 in (1.83 m)
- Positions: Defender; midfielder

Youth career
- –: Scunthorpe United

Senior career*
| Years | Team | Apps | (Gls) |
| 1985–1993 | Scunthorpe United | 103 | (4) |
| 1992 | → Doncaster Rovers (loan) | 1 | (0) |
- * Club domestic league appearances and goals

Andrew John Stevenson (born 29 September 1967) is an English former professional footballer who made 104 appearances in the Football League playing for Scunthorpe United and Doncaster Rovers. He played as a defender or in midfield.

== Career ==
Stevenson was born in Scunthorpe, and began his football career as a junior with hometown club Scunthorpe United. He made his debut in February 1986, aged 18, as a substitute in a 3–1 defeat at Port Vale in the Fourth Division. He established himself as a first-team player during the 1988–89 season, but according to a feature in the club's match programme, his "lack of a specified position may have counted against him" when it came to regular first-team football. He had a spell on loan at Doncaster Rovers in 1992, and was released at the end of the 1992–93 season.
