= Robert Scott (footballer, born 1964) =

Scottish footballer (born 1964)

Personal information
- Full name: Robert Scott
- Date of birth: 13 January 1964 (age 62)
- Place of birth: Broxburn, Scotland
- Height: 5 ft 10 in (1.78 m)
- Position: Forward

Youth career
- Hamilton Academical
- Linlithgow Rose

Senior career*
Years	Team	Apps	(Gls)
- Whitburn Junior
1988–1990	Colchester United	37	(8)
1990–1997	East Fife	205	(79)
1997	Ayr United	18	(6)
1997–1998	Clyde	15	(2)
1998	Forfar Athletic	7	(0)
- Whitburn Junior
Total		282	(95)
- * Club domestic league appearances and goals

Robert Scott (born 13 January 1964) is a Scottish former footballer who played as a forward in the Football League for Colchester United and in the Scottish Football League for East Fife, Ayr United, Clyde and Forfar Athletic.

== Career ==
Born in Broxburn, Scott was spotted by then-Colchester United manager Jock Wallace playing for Whitburn Junior. He had previously been on the books at Hamilton Academical and played for Linlithgow Rose. Colchester signed Scott at the midway point of the 1988–89 season, where until joining United he had scored 38 goals during the campaign for Whitburn. As a trialist, Scott impressed by scoring a hat-trick in a reserve team game, and later contributed five goals to steer Colchester away from relegation to the Football Conference in his first 12 games for the club. His debut came on 24 March 1989 in a goalless draw with Grimsby Town at Layer Road. His first goal came one week later, opening the scoring in a 3–0 win against Rochdale before being substituted for Stuart Hicks.

The success of his first half-season with Colchester didn't transcend into the second, as he could only muster three goals in 14 starts and 11 substitute appearances for the club as they were relegated to the Conference. Scott failed to settle so far from his native Scotland, as he scored his eighth and final goal for the club in a 2–0 win over Gillingham on 23 February 1990 and played his last match on 29 April 1990, a 4–0 away defeat at Cambridge United where he came on as a substitute for Gary Bennett. In total, Scott made 37 league appearances for the U's, scoring eight times.

Scott returned to Scotland with Scottish Football League side East Fife, where he made 205 league appearances between 1990 and 1997, scoring 79 goals. He then had a brief spell with Ayr United, where he amassed six goals in 18 appearances in the second half of the 1996–97 season. This prompted a move to Clyde, but he could only manage two goals in 15 league appearances, both of which came during a 4–3 win over Inverness Caledonian Thistle. Scott made seven appearances for Forfar Athletic in the second half of the 1997–98 season, but failed to register a goal. He then returned to Whitburn Juniors where he ended his career.
