= Steve Cookson (footballer) =

English footballer

Personal information
- Full name: Steven Jon Cookson
- Date of birth: 19 February 1972 (age 54)
- Place of birth: Wolverhampton, England
- Position: Striker

Youth career
- 1988–1990: Torquay United

Senior career*
Years	Team	Apps	(Gls)
1990–1991	Torquay United	12	(1)
1990–1992	Cradley Town		
1992–1993	Banche		
1993–?	Floreat Athena		
- Sorrento
?–2000	Stourbridge		
2000–2001	Bloxwich Town		
2001	Paget Rangers		
2001–?	Bloxwich Town		
- * Club domestic league appearances and goals

Steven John Cookson (born 19 February 1972 in Wolverhampton) is an English former professional footballer.

Cookson began his career as a trainee with Torquay United, making his debut during the 1989–90 season whilst still a trainee. He turned professional in July 1990 and went on to make 12 appearances for the Gulls, scoring once before being released in May 1991.

He was released to join Nottingham Forest in 1990 on a trial period before returning to Torquay.

On his release he joined non-league Cradley Town, along with others who had just been released by Torquay, Darren Attwood and Alan Convy.

In 1992 he played for Banche in the Belgium league for a short spell.

In 1993 he joined Floreat Athena in Perth, Australia before transferring to Sorrento where he was the top goalscorer in the league and voted player of the season only to return to England.

In July 1997 the North Devon Journal linked Cookson with a move from Stourbridge to Bideford, then managed by his cousin, the former Torquay forward, Dean Edwards, but the move never came to fruition.

He joined Bloxwich Town in July 2000. He joined Paget Rangers in March 2001, having been linked with a move the previous December, but was with back with Bloxwich Town by October 2001.

He represented the ex-pro Sunday team Marstons Sports in a UK Sunday league and went on to win a FA Sunday National cup.
