= John McGinley (footballer) =

English footballer (born 1959)

Personal information
- Date of birth: 11 June 1959 (age 67)
- Place of birth: Rowlands Gill, England
- Height: 6 ft 2 in (1.88 m)
- Positions: Left wing; forward

Senior career*
Years	Team	Apps	(Gls)
1979–1980	Ashington		
1980–1982	Gateshead		
1982	Sunderland	3	(0)
1982	Gateshead	0	(0)
1982–1984	Charleroi		
1984–1986	Lincoln City	71	(11)
1986–1987	Rotherham United	4	(0)
1987	→ Hartlepool United (loan)	2	(0)
1987–1989	Lincoln City	41	(7)
1989–1990	Doncaster Rovers	10	(0)
1990	→ Boston United (loan)	16	(10)
1990–1992	Boston United	43	(10)
- * Club domestic league appearances and goals

John McGinley (born 11 June 1959) is an English professional footballer who scored 18 goals from 131 appearances in the Football League playing on the left wing or as a forward for Sunderland, Lincoln City, Rotherham United, Hartlepool United and Doncaster Rovers.

== Football career ==
McGinley was born in Rowlands Gill, then in County Durham. He played non-League football for Ashington and Gateshead before signing for First Division club Sunderland in early 1982. McGinley made his Football League debut on 10 February 1982 in the starting eleven for a 2–0 home defeat to Stoke City, but spent only four months with Sunderland, making just three first-team appearances, before rejoining Gateshead.

He played in Belgium for Charleroi before returning to England for two spells with Lincoln City either side of brief appearances for Rotherham United and Hartlepool United. Lincoln were relegated from the Fourth Division in 1987, but returned to the League at their first attempt, winning the Conference title in the 1987–88 season; McGinley and Phil Brown were their joint leading scorers with 20 goals apiece in all competitions. McGinley finished his League career in the 1989–90 season with Doncaster Rovers, then played for Boston United in the Conference.
