= Mark Radford (footballer) =

English footballer

Personal information
- Full name: Mark Radford
- Date of birth: 20 December 1968 (age 57)
- Place of birth: Leicester, England
- Height: 5 ft 11 in (1.80 m)
- Position: Midfielder

Youth career
- Colchester United

Senior career*
Years	Team	Apps	(Gls)
1986–1991	Colchester United	68	(5)
1991-1992	Wivenhoe Town	29	(5)
- Bury Town
Total		68	(5)
- * Club domestic league appearances and goals

Mark Radford (born 20 December 1968) is an English former footballer who played in the Football League as a midfielder for Colchester United. He has two daughters, Alice and Georgie Radford.

== Career ==
Born in Leicester, Radford was a product of Colchester United's youth policy who went on to make his first-team debut in the Associate Members' Cup during the 1986–87 season, coming on as a substitute for Keith Day in a 2–0 defeat to Gillingham on 26 January 1987. He made no further appearances during the season, but made 15 appearances in all competitions during the 1987–88 season, and scored his first goal the following season in a 2–1 defeat to Darlington at Layer Road which put Colchester bottom of the Football League on 25 November 1988.

On a personal level, Radford had a more successful 1989–90 season, scoring four goals in 19 league starts, but Colchester ended the season relegated to the Football Conference and outside of the Football League for the first time in 40 years. He had made 64 Football League appearances and scored five times for the club prior to their relegation. He played very few games in the Conference under manager Ian Atkins, amassing just one start and three substitute appearances before being released on the final day of the transfer window in early 1991. He went on to play for Wivenhoe Town and Bury Town.
