= Steve Osborne (footballer) =

English footballer

Personal information
- Full name: Steven Colin Osborne
- Date of birth: 3 March 1969 (age 57)
- Place of birth: Middlesbrough, England
- Height: 5 ft 10 in (1.78 m)
- Position: Striker

Senior career*
Years	Team	Apps	(Gls)
- South Bank
1989–1991	Peterborough United	60	(7)
1991	York City	9	(0)
- Chester-le-Street Town
Total		69	(7)
- * Club domestic league appearances and goals

Steven Colin Osborne (born 3 March 1969) is an English former professional footballer who played as a striker in the Football League for Peterborough United and York City, and in non-League football for South Bank and Chester-le-Street Town.
