= Clive Stafford =

English footballer

Personal information
- Full name: Clive Andrew Stafford
- Date of birth: 4 April 1963 (age 63)
- Place of birth: Ipswich, England
- Height: 6 ft 1 in (1.85 m)
- Position: Defender

Youth career
- Coplestonians

Senior career*
Years	Team	Apps	(Gls)
1977–1985	Coplestonians		
1985–1988	Achilles		
1988–1989	Diss Town		
1989–1990	Colchester United	33	(0)
1989–1990	→ Exeter City (loan)	2	(1)
1990–1992	Bury Town		
1992–1998	Sudbury Town		
1998–1999	Felixstowe Port & Town		
- * Club domestic league appearances and goals

Clive Stafford (born 4 April 1963) is an English former professional footballer.

== Career ==
Born in Ipswich, Stafford joined local amateur club Coplestonians in his teens, where he spent eight years, before joining Achilles in 1985. Three years later he signed for Diss Town. Working in the insurance industry at the time, following trials with Ipswich Town in January 1989, he turned professional after signing for Colchester United on 5 March. However, after just over a year at Colchester, including a loan spell at Exeter City and a trial at West Brom, he returned to non-League football with Bury Town.

In 1992, he signed for Sudbury Town, where he played alongside several other ex-Colchester players in a team that reached the first round of the FA Cup for the first time in the club's history. In 1998, he joined Felixstowe Port & Town, ending his playing career at the end of the season.

Stafford later served as reserve team manager at Woodbridge Town, and currently coaches at Coplestonians. He has also appeared in friendly matches for Suffolk County Cricket Club.
