= Roger Brown (footballer) =

English footballer and manager

- Brown playing for Norwich City against Everton in November 1979.

Personal information
- Full name: Roger William Brown
- Date of birth: 12 December 1952
- Place of birth: Tamworth, England
- Date of death: 17 August 2011 (aged 58)
- Place of death: Tamworth, England
- Height: 6 ft 1 in (1.85 m)
- Position: Defender

Youth career
- Dosthill Rovers
- Bolehall Swifts
- Walsall

Senior career*
| Years | Team | Apps | (Gls) |
- Paget Rangers
| 1974–1978 | Leamington | | |
| 1978–1979 | Bournemouth | 63 | (3) |
| 1979–1980 | Norwich City | 16 | (0) |
| 1980–1983 | Fulham | 141 | (18) |
| 1983–1986 | Bournemouth | 84 | (5) |
| 1986 | Weymouth | | |
| 1986–1987 | Poole Town | | |
| Total | | 304 | (26) |

Managerial career
- 1986–1987: Poole Town
- 1987–1988: Colchester United
- 1993–1994: Bolehall Swifts
- * Club domestic league appearances and goals

Roger William Brown (12 December 1952 – 17 August 2011) was an English football manager and player who played as a defender. He made over 300 Football League appearances in total, playing for Bournemouth in two spells, Norwich City and Fulham.

He managed Colchester United between 1987 and 1988.

== Playing career ==
Brown, born in Tamworth, began his career with local club Dosthill Rovers, later moving to Bolehall Swifts, before joining Walsall as an apprentice in 1970, but failed to earn a contract with the club. Following this, he joined Paget Rangers and then moved to Leamington after becoming a production manager at an engineering firm based in the town.

In February 1978, Brown was signed by John Benson at Bournemouth following the recommendation to him by Harry Redknapp after he had played alongside Brown at Leamington after a spell in the US with Seattle Sounders. He signed for a fee of £10,000, breaking the pro ranks at the age of 25. He made 63 league appearances for the Cherries, scoring three times before earning an £85,000 transfer to First Division club Norwich City in July 1979, following manager John Bond.

During his stint with City, Brown accumulated 21 appearances in all competitions prior to being sold to Fulham in March 1980 for £100,000, helping the club to an impressive 12th position in the league.

On his debut against Chelsea, Brown was injured, but he went on to become a fans favourite, leading the side to promotion to the Second Division in 1981–82 and scoring the winning goal against Lincoln City to seal promotion. He made 141 appearances and scored 18 times for the Cottagers.

In December 1983, Brown returned to Dean Court for a second spell with Bournemouth, signed by then-rookie manager Harry Redknapp for £35,000. Just weeks after his return, Brown captained the side during one of the greatest shocks in the history of the FA Cup by defeating holders Manchester United 2–0. The Bournemouth side were struggling in the Third Division at the time as he played an important central defensive role to keep the United stars at bay.

Brown made 84 appearances and scored five goals in his second stint with Bournemouth, also winning an Associate Members' Cup medal in 1984 before he departed for non-league football once again, playing for Weymouth and Poole Town.

== Managerial career ==
Brown began his managerial career while with Poole Town, becoming player-manager during the 1986–87 season. He was then signed to become manager of Colchester United in November 1987 following the sensational sacking of previous manager Mike Walker when the side were joint-top of the Fourth Division. From 1 January 1988 when the club were top of the league to the end of the season, Brown's team won just five games to finish ninth – the lowest position for the club in 15 seasons. Brown brought in his own players during the summer, only for the team to collapse to an 8–0 away defeat to Leyton Orient on 15 October 1988. Following this result, the U's record defeat, Brown was promptly sacked.

Brown would later go on to manage Bolehall Swifts alongside his brother Gary from 1993 to 1994.

== Death ==
Roger Brown died on 17 August 2011 aged 58 after a long battle with cancer. He is survived by his two children, Katie and Mark, four grandchildren Summer, Mia and Olivia and Connor and his two brothers Gary and Paul, and sister Gail.

== Managerial statistics ==
Managerial record by team and tenure
| Team | From | To | Record | | | | |
| Team | From | To | P | W | D | L | Win % |
|---|---|---|---|---|---|---|---|
| Colchester United | 4 November 1987 | 18 October 1988 | 47 | 15 | 12 | 20 | 31.9 |

All statistics referenced by:

== Honours ==
Bournemouth

- Associate Members' Cup: 1983–84
