= Heybridge Swifts F.C. =

Association football club in England

Coordinates: 51°44′39″N 0°42′2″E

- Full name: Heybridge Swifts Football Club
- Nickname: Swifts
- Founded: 1880
- Ground: Scraley Road, Heybridge
- Capacity: 3,000 (550 seated)
- Chairman: Steve Spreadbury
- Manager: Mark Hawkes
- League: Essex Senior League
- 2025–26: Isthmian League North Division, 21st of 22 (relegated)
Home colours	Away colours

Heybridge Swifts Football Club is a football club based in Heybridge, near Maldon, Essex, England. They are currently members of the Essex Senior League and play at Scraley Road.

== History ==
The club was established in 1880 as Heybridge Football Club. After joining the Mid-Essex League they won Division One in 1908–09 and again in 1911–12. The club subsequently became members of the Essex & Suffolk Border League and were runners-up in Division Two (West) in 1919–20. The club won the division the following season, before finishing as runners-up again in 1921–22 and 1924–25. They later moved up to Division One and were runners-up in 1928–29. The club went on to win the division in 1930–31, earning promotion to the Senior Division. The following season saw them finish as runners-up in the Senior Division, as well as winning the Essex Junior Cup.

After World War II Heybridge returned to the Mid-Essex League, winning the league and the Division One League Cup in 1946–47. In 1949–50 the club joined the Premier Division of the South Essex League, but left after a single season. They returned to the Mid-Essex League and were champions of Division One (now the league's second division after the creation of the Premier Division in 1949) in 1955–56, as well as winning the Division One League Cup. The club later rejoined the Essex & Suffolk Border League and were runners-up in the Premier Division in 1965–66. After finishing as runners-up again in 1969–70 they were founder members of the Essex Senior League in 1971. They finished bottom of the league in 1973–74, but were runners-up in 1980–81 and then won three consecutive league titles between 1981–82 and 1983–84. Following their third title the club moved up to Division Two North of the Isthmian League.

Heybridge were Division Two North champions in 1989–90, earning promotion to Division One. In 1994–95 the club reached the first round of the FA Cup for the first time, losing 2–0 to Gillingham in a home match that was moved to Layer Road in Colchester. In 1995–96 they finished the season as Division One runners-up and were promoted to the Premier Division. The club reached the first round of the FA Cup again in 1997–98, losing 3–0 at AFC Bournemouth. Another first round appearance in 2002–03 ended in a 7–0 defeat to Bristol City. A sixteenth-place finish in 2003–04 saw Heybridge play-off with St Albans City for a place in the new Conference South, but they lost 4–3. The club were Premier Division runners-up in 2005–06, qualifying for the promotion play-offs, in which they lost on penalties to Hampton & Richmond Borough in the semi-finals following a 1–1 draw.

Heybridge remained in the Premier Division until the end of the 2008–09 season, when they were relegated to Division One North. A third-place finish in 2013–14 saw them qualify for the play-offs, but they went on to lose 3–0 to Harlow Town in the semi-finals. In the 2017–18 season the club reached the first round of the FA Cup for the fourth time, losing 3–1 at Exeter City; winger Sam Bantick scored Heybridge's first goal in the proper rounds of the competition. They also finished fifth in the renamed North Division, reaching the play-offs. However, the club were beaten 2–0 by Haringey Borough in the semi-finals. The following season saw the club finish fifth in the North Division, again qualifying for the play-offs. Despite defeating Aveley 2–0 in the semi-finals and then beating local rivals Maldon & Tiptree on penalties in the final, the club were denied promotion as only the five eighth-tier play-off winners with the best points-per-game record were promoted, with Heybridge ranked sixth.

== Ground ==
The club played at Bentall's Sports Ground from 1890 until being evicted in 1964 so a shopping centre could be built on the site. After playing at Sadd's Athletic for two seasons, the club moved to Scraley Road, formerly a carrot field, in 1966. A wooden stand was soon built on the western side of the pitch, becoming the West Stand. The stand was extended during the early 1980s, with bench seating also installed. In 1994 a covered terrace was erected, but it had to be dismantled and rebuilt the following year after the local council had declared it unsafe.

The main stand was built on the other side of the pitch to the wooden stand in 1995 and has uncovered terraces on either side. The Scraley Road end is an uncovered terrace, whilst the other end, the South Stand, consists of a covered terrace. The ground currently has a capacity of 3,000, of which 550 is seated and 1,200 covered.

== Honours ==
- Isthmian League
  - Division Two North champions 1989–90
  - League Cup winners 1981–82, 2000–01
- Essex Senior League
  - Champions 1981–82, 1982–83, 1983–84
- Essex & Suffolk Border League
  - Division One champions 1930–31
  - Division Two (West) champions 1920–21
- Mid-Essex League
  - Champions 1908–09, 1911–12, 1946–47
  - Division One champions 1955–56
  - Division One League Cup winners 1946–47, 1955–56
- Essex Junior Cup
  - Winners 1931–32
- East Anglian Cup
  - Winners 1993–94, 1994–95
- Tolleshunt D'Arcy Memorial Cup
  - Winners 1955–56, 1959–60, 2006–07, 2014–15, 2015–16, 2016–17

== Records ==
- Best FA Cup performance: First round, 1994–95, 1997–98, 2002–03, 2017–18
- Best FA Trophy performance: Quarter-finals, 1996–97
- Best FA Vase performance: Fifth round, 1986–87
- Record attendance: 2,477 v Woking, FA Trophy quarter-finals, 1997
- Most appearances: John Pollard, 543
- Most goals: Arthur "Stumpy" Moss, 193 (1948–1960)
- Record transfer fee paid: £1,000 to Grays Athletic for Dave Rainford; £1,000 to Chelmsford City for Lee Kersey
- Record transfer fee received: £35,000 from Southend United for Simon Royce

== See also ==
- Heybridge Swifts F.C. players
- Heybridge Swifts F.C. managers
