= Koller =

Koller or Köller is a Germanic surname. Notable people with the surname include:

- AJ Koller, American professional pickleball player
- Alexander von Koller (1813–1890), Austro-Hungarian military officer
- Alexandru Koller (born 1953), Romanian football player
- Alice Koller (1925–2020), American writer and academic
- Ákos Koller (born 1974), Romanian-born Hungarian football player
- Arnold Koller (born 1933), Swiss politician
- Ben Koller (born 1980), drummer of the American band Converge
- Broncia Koller-Pinell (1863–1934), American painter
- Cárlos Koller (1890–?), Chilean cyclist
- Celine Koller (born 1996), Swiss curler
- Dagmar Koller (born 1939), Austrian actress and singer
- Daphne Koller (born 1968), American computer scientist
- David Koller (born 1960), Czech singer
- Don Koller (born 1942), American politician
- Edmund Koller (1930–1998), West German bobsledder
- Franz Koller (born 1947), Austrian farmer and politician
- Fred Koller (born 1950), American singer-songwriter
- George Koller (born 1958), Canadian bassist
- Hans Koller (1921–2003), Austrian jazz musician and painter
- Hans Koller (born 1970), German-born UK-based jazz pianist
- Jackie French Koller (born 1948), American author
- James Koller (1936–2014), American poet
- Jan Koller (1901–?), Czech sports shooter
- Jan Koller (born 1973), Czech football player
- Jenny Thomann-Koller (1866–1949), Swiss gynecologist and pediatrician
- Johann Koller (1921-1999), Austrian field hockey player
- Johann Georg Koller (born 1971), German politician
- Karl Koller (ophthalmologist) (1857–1944), Austrian ophthalmologist
- Karl Koller (general) (1898–1951), German Luftwaffe general
- Karl Koller (1929–2009), Austrian footballer
- Károly Koller (1838–1889), Austro-Hungarian photographer and painter
- Krisztián Koller (born 1983), Hungarian footballer
- Lou Koller (born 1967), American punk rock singer
- Lorenz Koller (born 1994), Austrian luger
- Marcel Koller (born 1960), Swiss football player
- Marco Köller (born 1969), German footballer
- Marian Wolfgang Koller (1792–1866), Austrian scientist and educator
- Nicole Koller (born 1997), Swiss racing cyclist
- Noemie Benczer Koller (born 1933), American nuclear physicist
- Patrick Koller (born 1983), Austrian freestyle skier
- Peo Charles Koller (1904–1979) Hungarian-born cytologist and cytogeneticist
- Pete Koller American punk rock guitarist
- Rose Koller (1909-2008), Austrian sculptor
- Rudolf Koller (1828–1905), Swiss painter
- Uwe Köller (born 1964), German trumpeter
- Veronika Koller (born 1973), Austrian-British linguist
- Xavier Koller (born 1944), Oscar-winning filmmaker

== See also ==
- Kohler (disambiguation)
- Köhler
- Koehler
