= Shawan =

Shawan may refer to:

- Shawan, Missouri

== China ==
- Shanwan, Hongjiang (沙湾乡), a township of Hongjiang City, Hunan
- Shawan (沙湾, lit. "Sandy Bay"), a settlement in Shandong; see 1452 Yellow River floods
- Shawan Ancient Town, a township in Panyu District of Guangzhou City, Guangdong
- Shawan, Xinjiang, a county-level city in Xinjiang Uyghur Autonomous Region
- Shawan District, in Leshan Prefecture-Level City, Sichuan

== People ==
- Shawan Jabarin (born 1960), general director of Al-Haq
- Shawan Robinson (born 1983), American professional basketball player
- Jeff Shawan (born 1956/1957), American politician

== See also ==
- Gumaa Al-Shawan (1937–2011), Egyptian spy
- Aziz El-Shawan (1916–1993), Egyptian composers
