= Mike Dethrow =

American politician

Member of the Missouri House of Representatives from the 153rd district
- In office January 8, 2003 – January 5, 2011
- Preceded by: Don Koller
- Succeeded by: Steve Cookson

Personal details
- Born: August 7, 1952 (age 73) Thayer, Missouri
- Party: Republican

Mike Dethrow (born August 7, 1952) is an American politician who served in the Missouri House of Representatives from the 153rd district from 2003 to 2011.
