= Steve Cookson (politician) =

American politician

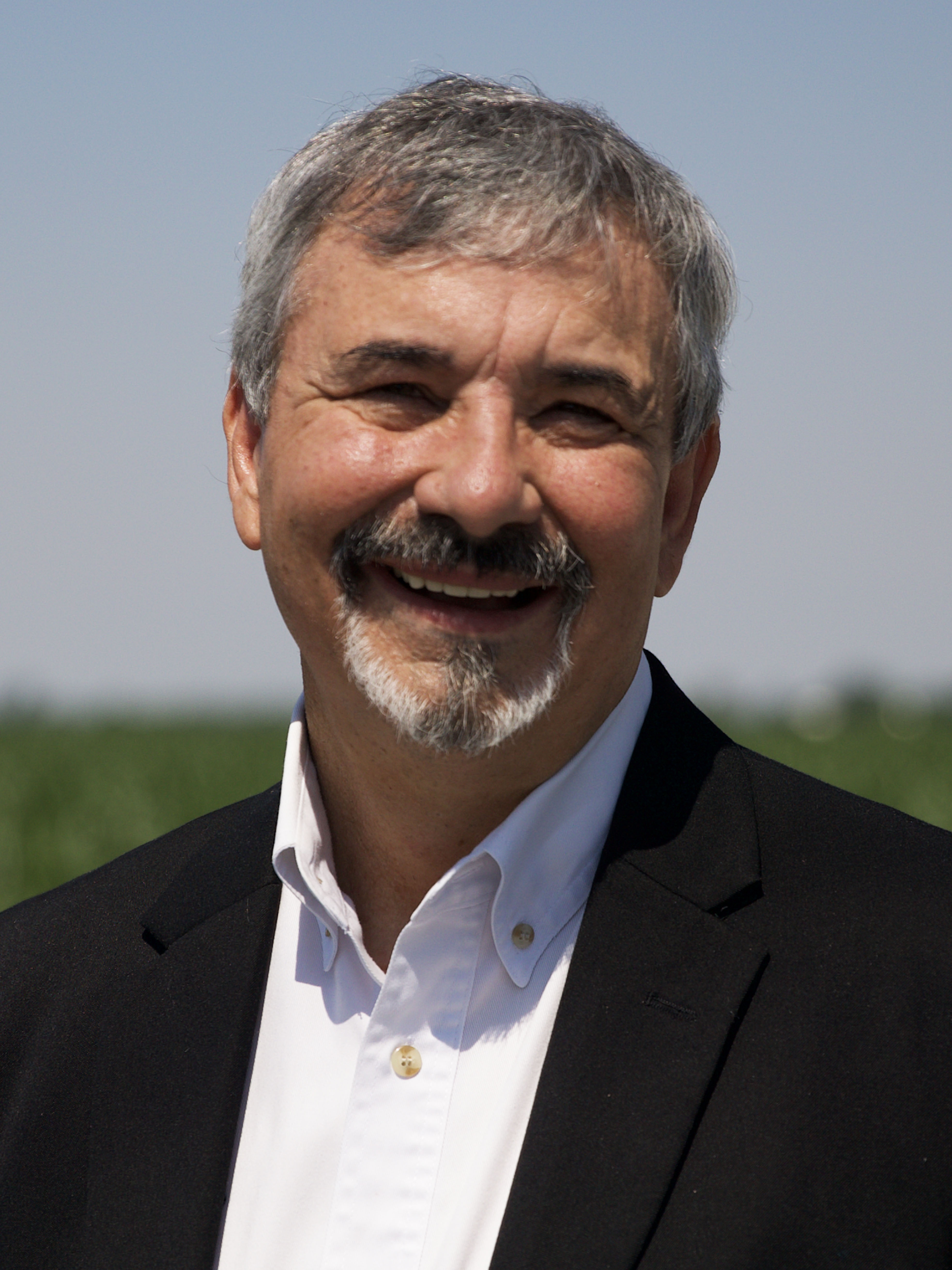

Member of the Missouri House of Representatives from the 153rd district
- In office January 5, 2011 – January 4, 2019
- Preceded by: Mike Dethrow
- Succeeded by: Jeff Shawan

Personal details
- Born: Stephen Carroll Cookson; June 26, 1958 Dallas, Texas, U.S.
- Died: April 28, 2025 (aged 66) Poplar Bluff, Missouri, U.S.
- Party: Republican
- Education: Three Rivers College (AA); College of the Ozarks (BS); Southeast Missouri State University (M. Ed.)

Stephen Carroll Cookson (June 26, 1958 – April 28, 2025) was an American educator, farmer and politician.

Prior to being elected to the Missouri House of Representatives, Cookson worked in education for three decades. He served as a coach, teacher, principal and superintendent before his retirement in 2010. Cookson was elected to the Missouri House of Representatives in November 2010, serving the citizens of District 153.

Cookson ran for the Missouri Senate in the 2020 general election for Missouri's 25th Senate District.

== Early life, education, and career ==
Steve Cookson was born on June 26, 1958, in Dallas, Texas. After spending the first year of his life in Dallas, the Cookson family moved to Puxico, Missouri. He was born into a family of educators, and his family relocated often in his early years. Steve’s father, legendary basketball coach Carroll Cookson, moved to Advance, Missouri, in 1966. Steve had a front row seat as his father gradually built one of the most storied high school basketball programs in the State of Missouri.

Upon graduation with honors from Advance High School in 1976, Steve enrolled in Three Rivers College in Poplar Bluff, Missouri. During his time there, Steve played on the basketball squad for legendary Coach Gene Bess.

After graduating from Three Rivers in 1978, Steve furthered his education at College of the Ozarks in Point Lookout, Missouri. He graduated in 1980 with dual degrees in Physical Education and Biology.

Steve started his career in 1981 teaching junior high in the Southwest R-5 School District in Washburn, Missouri. Steve taught a variety of subjects throughout his career, and also served as a basketball coach. He was named superintendent of the Naylor R-11 School District in 2001, and finished his career out with retirement in May 2010.

== Missouri House of Representatives ==
=== Elections ===
On November 2, 2010, Cookson was elected to represent the citizens of District 153 in the Missouri House of Representatives. District 153 consists of areas in Butler, Ripley, Carter and Wayne counties. He was sworn in on January 5, 2011. Cookson served on various committees throughout the 2011-2018 legislative sessions. In part to his lengthy background in education, he was appointed as chair of both the Elementary and Secondary Education Committee, as well as the Higher Education Committee.

=== 2010 ===
On November 2, 2010, Cookson won election to the Missouri House of Representatives. Cookson's opponent in the August 3 primary was Chris Johnston.

=== 2012 ===
Cookson won re-election in the 2012 election for Missouri House of Representatives, District 153. Cookson ran unopposed in the August 7 Republican primary and ran unopposed in the general election, which took place on November 6, 2012.

=== 2014 ===
Elections for the Missouri House of Representatives took place in 2014. A primary election was held on August 5, 2014, and a general election on November 4, 2014. The signature filing deadline for candidates wishing to run in this election was March 25, 2014. Incumbent Steve Cookson was unopposed in the Republican primary. Ginny Keirns was unopposed in the Libertarian primary. Cookson faced Keirns in the general election. Incumbent Cookson defeated Keirns in the general election.

=== 2016 ===
Elections for the Missouri House of Representatives took place in 2016. The primary election was held on August 2, 2016, and the general election was held on November 8, 2016. The candidate filing deadline was March 29, 2016. Incumbent Steve Cookson defeated Matt Michel in the Missouri House of Representatives District 153 general election.

=== Committee assignments ===
- Agriculture Policy
- Appropriations - Public Safety and Corrections
- Children and Families
- Education
- Elementary and Secondary Education, Chair
- Higher Education, Chair
- Joint Committee on Corrections, Vice Chair
- Joint Committee on Education
- Tourism and Natural Resources
- Trade and Tourism

== Electoral history ==
Missouri House of Representatives, District 153, General Election, 2010
Party	Candidate	Votes	%
Republican	Steve Cookson	6,393	58.7
Democratic	George Meyers	3,856	35.4
Constitution	Rory Calhoun	647	5.9

Missouri House of Representatives, District 153, General Election, 2012
Party	Candidate	Votes	%
Republican	Steve Cookson	11,464	79.6
Independent	Jack "Skip" Johnson	2,939	20.4

Missouri House of Representatives, District 153, General Election, 2014
Party	Candidate	Votes	%
Republican	Steve Cookson	6,483	82.2
Libertarian	Gary Keirns	1,406	17.8

Missouri House of Representatives, District 153, General Election, 2016
Party	Candidate	Votes	%
Republican	Steve Cookson	11,681	74.87
Democratic	Matt Michel	3,920	25.13

Missouri House of Representatives
Preceded by Mike Dethrow	Member of the Missouri House of Representatives from the 153rd district 2010–2018	Succeeded by Jeff Shawan
