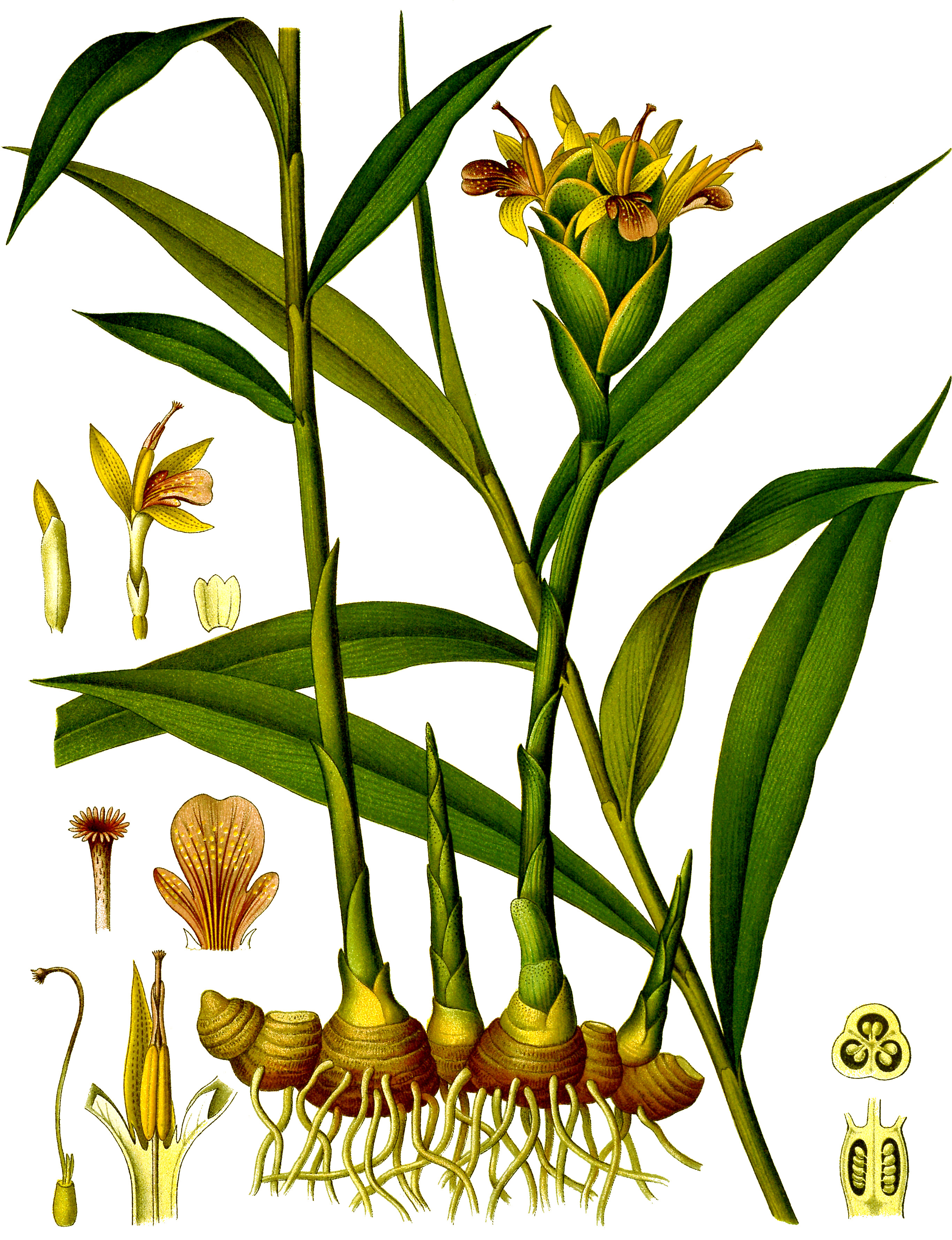
- 1896 color plate from Köhler's Medicinal Plants
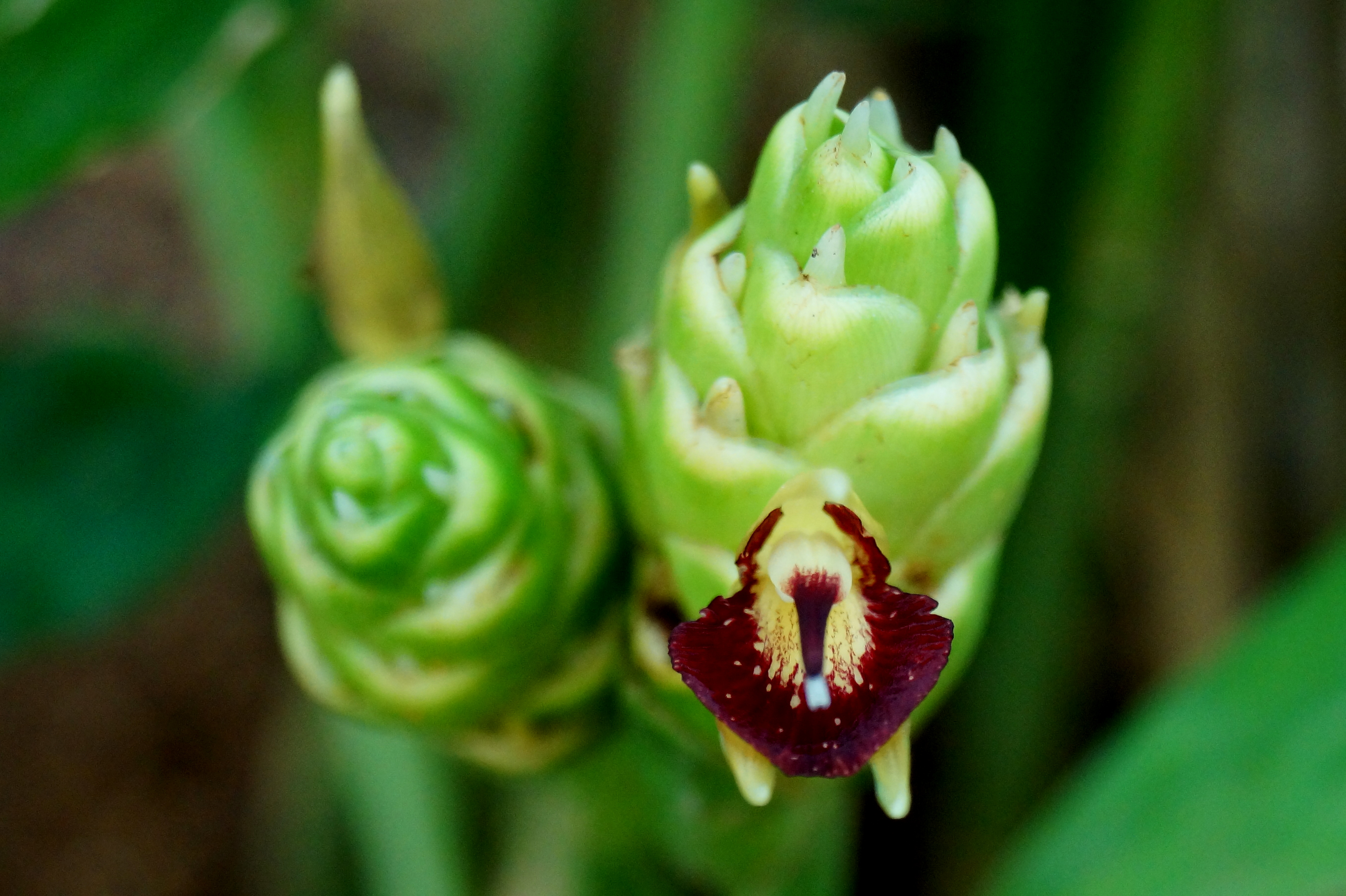
- Inflorescence

Scientific classification
- Kingdom: Plantae
- Clade: Tracheophytes
- Clade: Angiosperms
- Clade: Monocots
- Clade: Commelinids
- Order: Zingiberales
- Family: Zingiberaceae
- Genus: Zingiber
- Species: Z. officinale

Binomial name
- Zingiber officinale Roscoe

= Ginger =

Species of plant used as a spice

Ginger (Zingiber officinale) is a flowering plant whose rhizome, ginger root or ginger, is widely used as a spice and a folk medicine. It is an herbaceous perennial that grows annual pseudostems (false stems made of the rolled bases of leaves) about one meter tall, bearing narrow leaf blades. The inflorescences bear flowers having pale yellow petals with purple edges, and arise directly from the rhizome on separate shoots.

Ginger is in the family Zingiberaceae, which also includes turmeric (Curcuma longa), cardamom (Elettaria cardamomum), and galangal. Ginger originated in Maritime Southeast Asia and was likely domesticated first by the Austronesian peoples. It was transported with them throughout the Indo-Pacific during the Austronesian expansion (c. 5,000 BP), reaching as far as Hawaii. Ginger is one of the first spices to have been exported from Asia, arriving in Europe with the spice trade, and was used by ancient Greeks and Romans. The distantly related dicots in the genus Asarum are commonly called wild ginger because of their similar taste.

Ginger has been used in traditional medicine in China, India and Japan for centuries, and as a modern dietary supplement. Ginger may offer benefits over placebo for nausea and vomiting during pregnancy, but there is no good evidence that it helps with nausea during chemotherapy. It remains uncertain whether ginger is effective for treating any disease. In 2023, world production of ginger was 4.9 million tonnes, led by India with 45% of the total.

== Etymology ==
The English origin of the word "ginger" is from the mid-14th century, from Old English gingifer, which derives in turn from the Medieval Latin gingiber, gingiber from the Greek ζιγγίβερις zingiberis from the Prakrit (Middle Indic) siṅgabera, and siṅgabera from the Sanskrit śṛṅgavera. The Sanskrit word is thought to come from an ancient Dravidian word that also produced the Tamil and Malayalam term iñci-vēr (from vēr, "root"); an alternative explanation is that the Sanskrit word comes from srngam, meaning "horn", and vera, meaning "body" (describing the shape of its root), but that may be folk etymology. The word probably was readopted in Middle English from the Old French gingibre (modern French gingembre).

== Origin and distribution ==
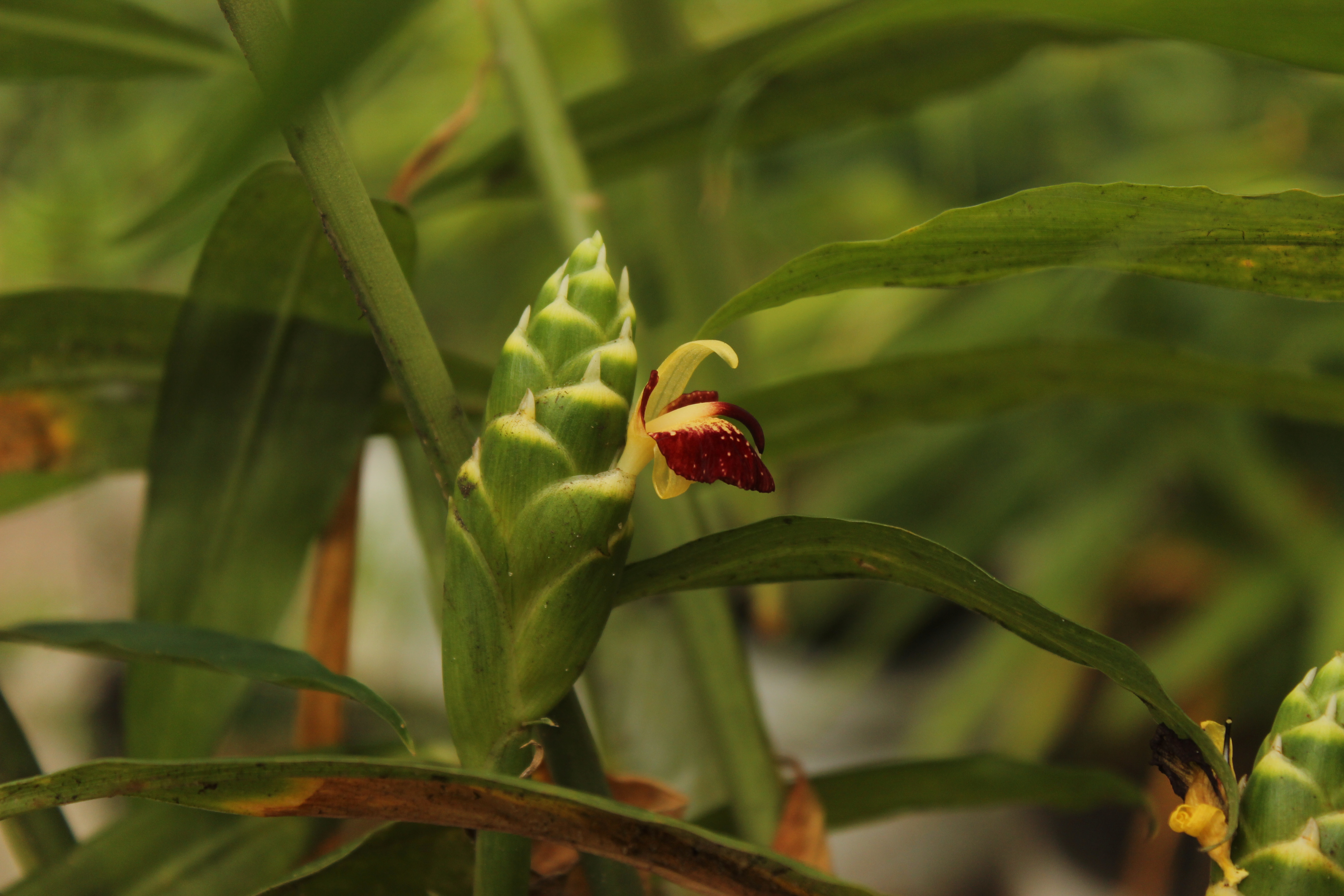
Ginger flower

Ginger originated in Maritime Southeast Asia. It is a true cultigen and does not exist in its wild state. The most ancient evidence of its domestication is among the Austronesian peoples where it was among several species of ginger cultivated and exploited since ancient times. They cultivated other gingers including turmeric (Curcuma longa), white turmeric (Curcuma zedoaria), and bitter ginger (Zingiber zerumbet). The rhizomes and the leaves were used to flavour food or eaten directly. The leaves were also used to weave mats. Aside from these uses, ginger had religious significance among Austronesians, being used in rituals for healing and for asking protection from spirits. It was also used in the blessing of Austronesian ships.

Ginger was carried with them in their voyages as canoe plants during the Austronesian expansion, starting from around 5,000 BP. They introduced it to the Pacific Islands in prehistory, long before any contact with other civilizations. Reflexes of the Proto-Malayo-Polynesian word *laqia are found in Austronesian languages all the way to Hawaii. They also presumably introduced it to India along with other Southeast Asian food plants and Austronesian sailing technologies, during early contact by Austronesian sailors with the Dravidian-speaking peoples of Sri Lanka and South India at around 3,500 BP. It was also carried by Austronesian voyagers into Madagascar and the Comoros in the 1st millennium CE.

From India, it was carried by traders into the Middle East and the Mediterranean by around the 1st century CE. It was primarily grown in southern India and the Greater Sunda Islands during the spice trade, along with peppers, cloves, and numerous other spices.

== History ==
The first written record of ginger comes from the Analects, written by the Disciples of Confucius in China during the Warring States period (475–221 BCE). In it, Confucius was said to eat ginger with every meal. In 406, the monk Faxian wrote that ginger was grown in pots and carried on Chinese ships to prevent scurvy. During the Song dynasty (960–1279), ginger was being imported into China from southern countries.

Ginger spice was introduced to the Mediterranean by the Arabs, and described by writers like Dioscorides (40–90) and Pliny the Elder (24–79). In 150, Ptolemy noted that ginger was produced in Ceylon (Sri Lanka). Ginger—along with its relative, galangal—was imported into the Roman Empire as part of very expensive herbal remedies that only the wealthy could afford, e.g. for the kidneys. Aëtius of Amida describes both ginger and galangal as ingredients in his complex herbal prescriptions. Raw and preserved ginger were imported into Europe in increased quantity during the Middle Ages after European tastes shifted favorably towards its culinary properties; during this time, ginger was described in the official pharmacopeias of several countries. In 14th century England, a pound of ginger cost as much as a sheep.

Archaeological evidence of ginger in northwest Europe comes from the wreck of the Danish-Norwegian flagship, Gribshunden. The ship sank off the southern coast of Sweden in the summer of 1495 while conveying King Hans to a summit with the Swedish Council. Among the luxuries carried on the ship were ginger, cloves, saffron, and pepper.

The ginger plant was smuggled onto the Caribbean islands from Asia sometime in the 16th century, along with black pepper, cloves, and cinnamon, at the encouragement of the Spanish Crown, though only ginger thrived. It eventually displaced sugar to become the leading export crop on both Hispaniola and Puerto Rico by the end of the century, until the introduction of slave labour from Africa made sugar more economical to produce in the 17th century.

== Horticulture ==
Ginger produces clusters of white and pink flower buds that bloom into yellow flowers. Because of its aesthetic appeal and the adaptation of the plant to warm climates, it is often used as landscaping around subtropical homes. It is a perennial reed-like plant with annual leafy stems, about a meter (3 to 4 feet) tall. Traditionally, the rhizome is gathered when the stalk withers; it is immediately scalded, or washed and scraped, to kill it and prevent sprouting. The fragrant perisperm of the Zingiberaceae is used as sweetmeats by Bantu, and also as a condiment and sialogogue.

== Production ==
Raw ginger production 2023, tonnes
India	2,201,000
Nigeria	781,641
China	672,914
Nepal	309,533
Indonesia	198,873
Thailand	174,103
World	4,877,179
Source: FAOSTAT of the United Nations

In 2023, world production of raw ginger was 4.9 million tonnes, led by India with 45% of the total, and Nigeria and China as secondary producers.

=== Production in India ===
Though it is grown in many areas across the globe, ginger is "among the earliest recorded spices to be cultivated and exported from southwest India". India holds the seventh position in ginger export worldwide, however is the "largest producer of ginger in the world". Regions in southwest and Northeast India are most suitable for ginger production due to their warm and humid climate, average rainfall and land space.

Ginger has the ability to grow in a wide variety of land types and areas, however is best produced when grown in a warm, humid environment, at an elevation between 300 and 900 m (1,000 and 3,000 ft), and in well-drained soils at least 30 cm deep. A period of low rainfall prior to growing and well-distributed rainfall during growing are also essential for the ginger to thrive well in the soil.

Ginger produced in India is most often farmed through homestead farming, with work adaptively shared by available family and community members.

== Ginger farming ==
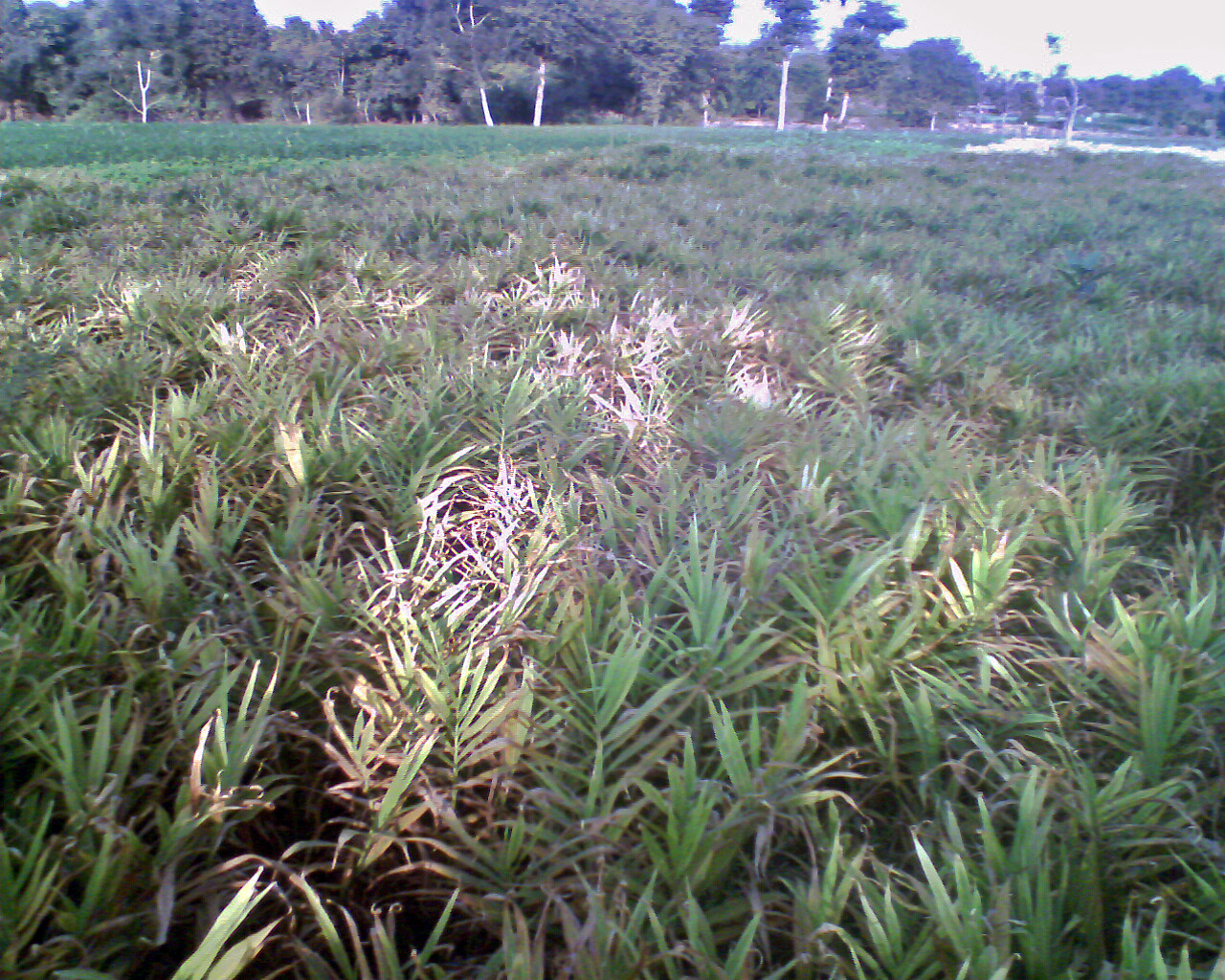
Ginger field

The size of the ginger rhizome is essential to the production of ginger. The larger the rhizome piece, the faster ginger will be produced and therefore the faster it will be sold onto the market. Prior to planting the seed rhizomes, farmers are required to treat the seeds to prevent pests, and rhizome rot and other seed-borne diseases. Various ways Indian farmers do seed treatment include dipping the seeds in cow dung emulsion, smoking the seeds before storage, and hot water treatment.

Once the seeds are properly treated, the farmland in which they are to be planted must be thoroughly dug or ploughed by the farmer to break up the soil. After the soil is sufficiently ploughed (at least 3–5 times), water channels are made 60–80 feet (18–24 m) apart to irrigate the crop.

The next step is planting the rhizome seed. In India, planting the irrigated ginger crop is usually done in the months between March and June as those months account for the beginning of the monsoon, or rainy season. Once the planting stage is done, farmers go on to mulch the crop to conserve moisture and check weed growth, as well as check surface run-off to conserve soil. Mulching is done by applying mulch (green leaves for example) to the plant beds directly after planting and again 45 and 90 days into growth. After mulching comes hilling, which is the stirring and breaking up of soil to check weed growth, break the firmness of the soil from rain, and conserve soil moisture. Farmers must ensure that their ginger crops are receiving supplemental irrigation if rainfall is low in their region. In India, farmers must irrigate their ginger crops every two weeks at the least between September and November (when the monsoon is over) to ensure maximum yield and high quality product.

The final farming stage for ginger is the harvesting stage. When the rhizome is planted for products such as vegetable, soda, and candy, harvesting should be done between four and five months of planting, whereas when the rhizome is planted for products such as dried ginger or ginger oil, harvesting must be done eight to ten months after planting.

Dry ginger is one of the most popular forms of ginger in commerce. Ginger rhizomes for dry ginger are harvested at full maturity (8–10 months). After soaking them in water, the outer skin is scraped off with a bamboo splinter or wooden knife by hand as it is too delicate a process to be done by machinery. The whole dried rhizomes are ground in the consuming centres. Fresh ginger does not need further processing after harvest, and it is harvested much younger.

== Transportation and export of ginger ==
Ginger is sent through various stages to be transported to its final destination either domestically or internationally. The journey begins when farmers sell a portion of their produce to village traders who collect produce right at the farm gate. Once the produce is collected, it is transported to the closest assembly market where it is then taken to main regional or district level marketing centres. Farmers with a large yield of produce will directly take their produce to local or regional markets. Once the produce has "reached [the] regional level markets, they are cleaned, graded, and packed in sacks of about 60 kg". They are then moved to terminal markets such as in New Delhi, Kochi, and Bombay.

States from which ginger is exported follow the marketing channels of vegetable marketing in India, and the steps are similar to those when transported domestically. However, instead of reaching a terminal market after the regional forwarding centres, the produce will reach an export market and then be sent off by vehicle, plane or boat to reach its final international destination, where it will arrive at a local retail market and finally reach the consumer once purchased.

Dry ginger is most popularly traded between Asian countries through a unique distribution system involving a network of small retail outlets. Fresh and preserved ginger are often sold directly to supermarket chains, and in some countries fresh ginger is seen exclusively in small shops unique to certain ethnic communities. India frequently exports its ginger and other vegetable produce to nearby Pakistan and Bangladesh, as well as "Saudi Arabia, the United Arab Emirates, Morocco, the United States, Yemen Republic, the United Kingdom, and Netherlands".

Though India is the largest ginger producer in the world, it fails to play the role of a large exporter and only accounts for about 1.17% of total ginger exports. Ginger farming in India is a costly and risky business, as farmers do not gain much money from exports and "more than 65% of the total cost incurred is toward labor and seed material purchase". The farm owner may benefit given that there are no losses in production or price decreases, which is not easily avoidable. Production of dry ginger proves to have a higher benefit–cost ratio, as well as ginger cultivated in intercropping systems rather than as a pure crop.

== Uses ==
=== Culinary ===
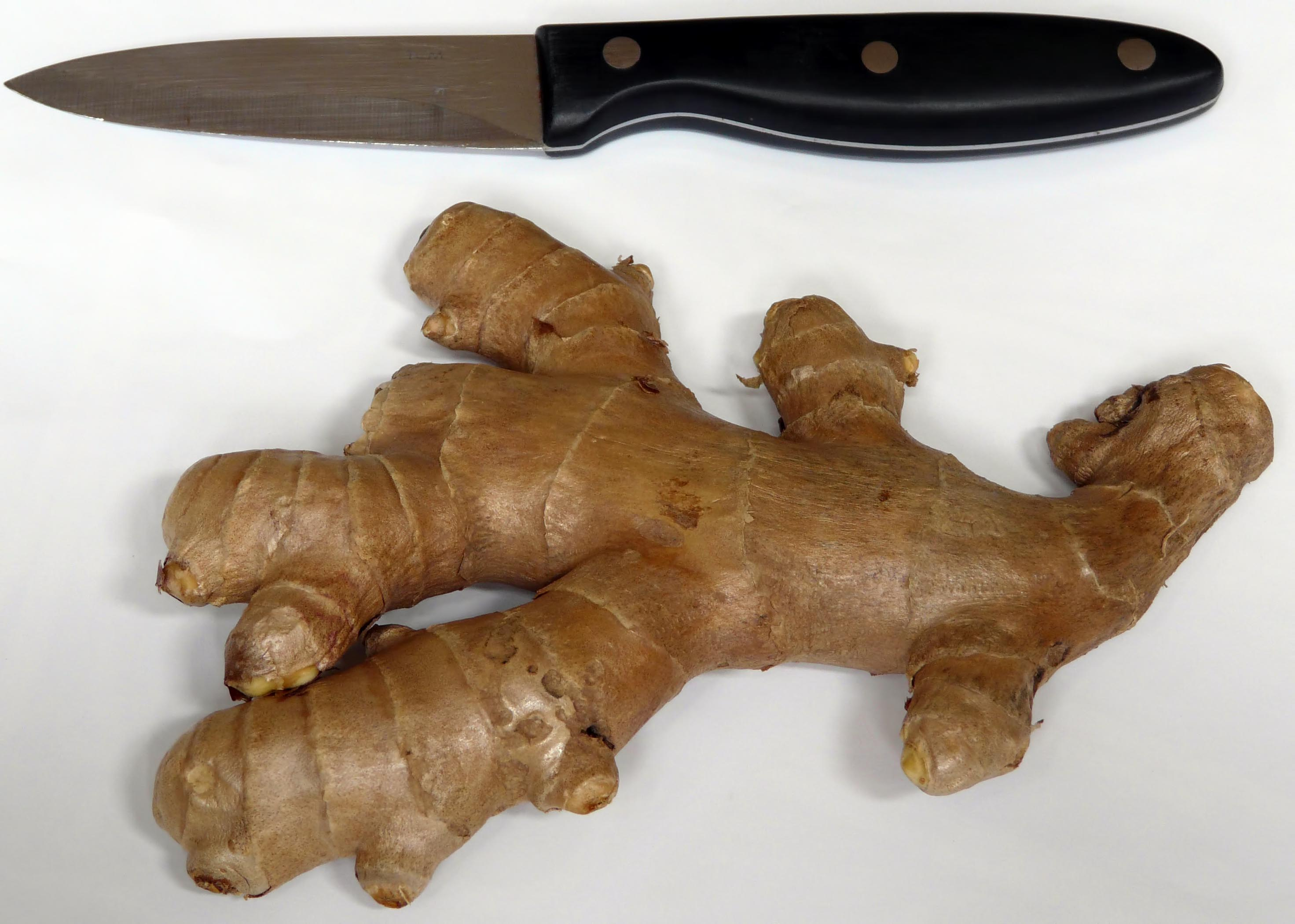
Fresh ginger rhizome

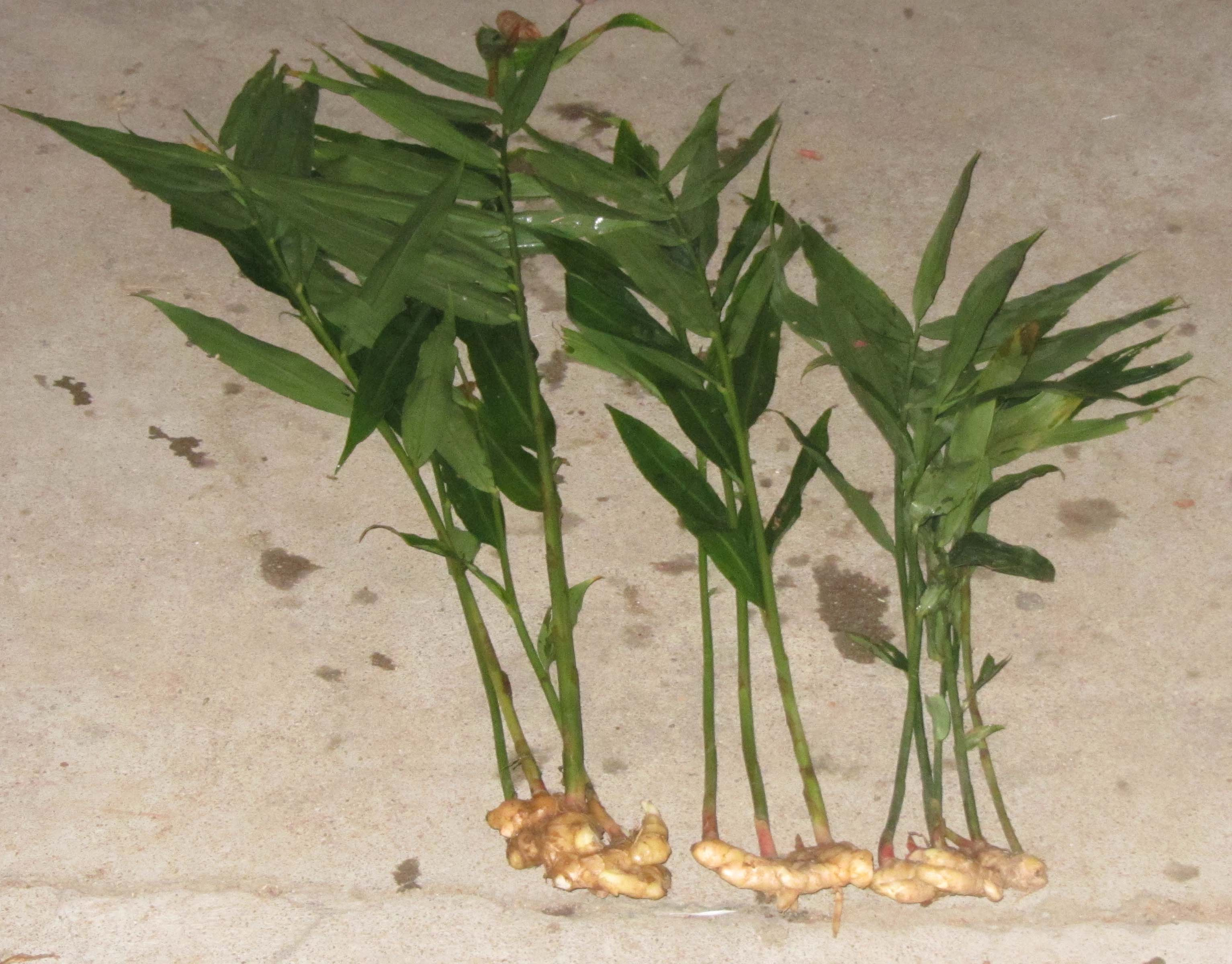
Freshly washed ginger

Ginger is a common spice used worldwide, whether for meals or as a folk medicine. Ginger can be used for a variety of food items such as vegetables, candy, soda, pickles, and alcoholic beverages.

Ginger is a fragrant kitchen spice. Young ginger rhizomes are juicy and fleshy with a mild taste. They are often pickled in vinegar or sherry as a snack or cooked as an ingredient in many dishes. They can be steeped in boiling water to make ginger herb tea, to which honey may be added. Ginger can be made into candy or ginger wine.

==== Asia ====
Mature ginger rhizomes are fibrous and nearly dry. The juice from ginger roots is often used as a seasoning in Indian recipes and is a common ingredient of Chinese, Korean, Japanese, Vietnamese, and many South Asian cuisines for flavoring dishes such as seafood, meat, and vegetarian dishes.

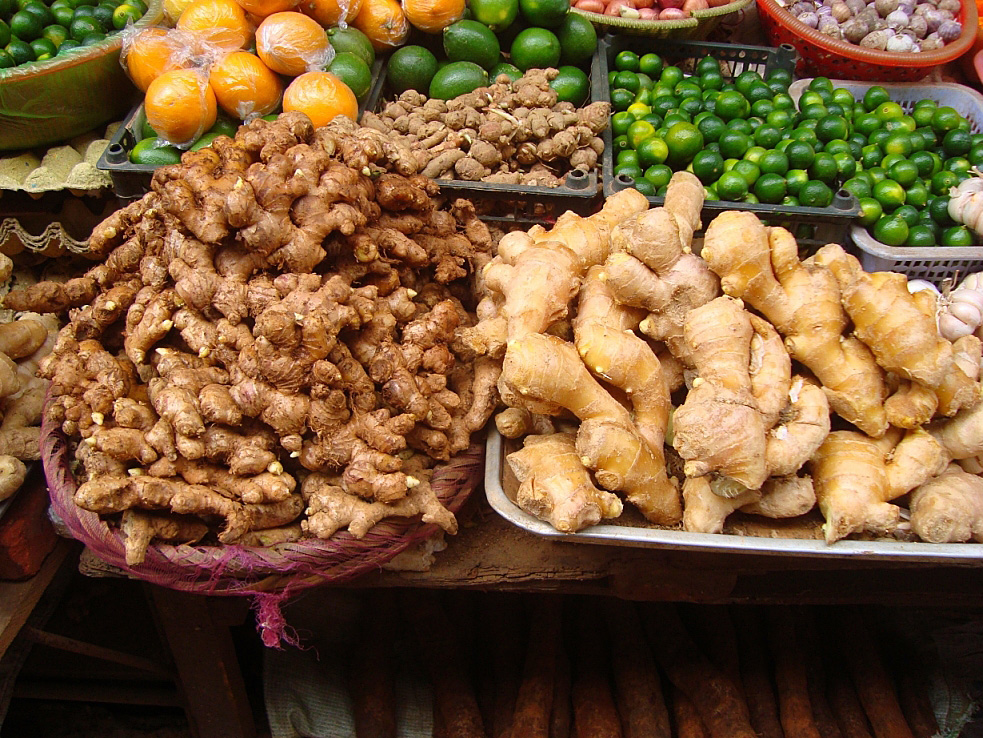
Two varieties of ginger in China

In Indian cuisine, ginger is a key ingredient, especially in thicker gravies, as well as in many other dishes, both vegetarian and meat-based. Ginger has a role in traditional Ayurvedic medicine. It is an ingredient in traditional Indian drinks, both cold and hot, including spiced masala chai. Fresh ginger is one of the main spices used for making pulse and lentil curries and other vegetable preparations. Fresh ginger together with peeled garlic cloves is crushed or ground to form ginger garlic masala. Fresh, as well as dried, ginger is used to spice tea and coffee, especially in winter. In south India, "sambharam" is a summer yogurt drink made with ginger as a key ingredient, along with green chillies, salt and curry leaves. Ginger powder is used in food preparations intended primarily for pregnant or nursing women, the most popular one being katlu, which is a mixture of gum resin, ghee, nuts, and sugar. Ginger is also consumed in candied and pickled form. In Japan, ginger is pickled to make beni shōga and gari or grated and used raw on tofu or noodles. It is made into a candy called shoga no sato zuke. In the traditional Korean kimchi, ginger is either finely minced or just juiced to avoid the fibrous texture and added to the ingredients of the spicy paste just before the fermenting process.

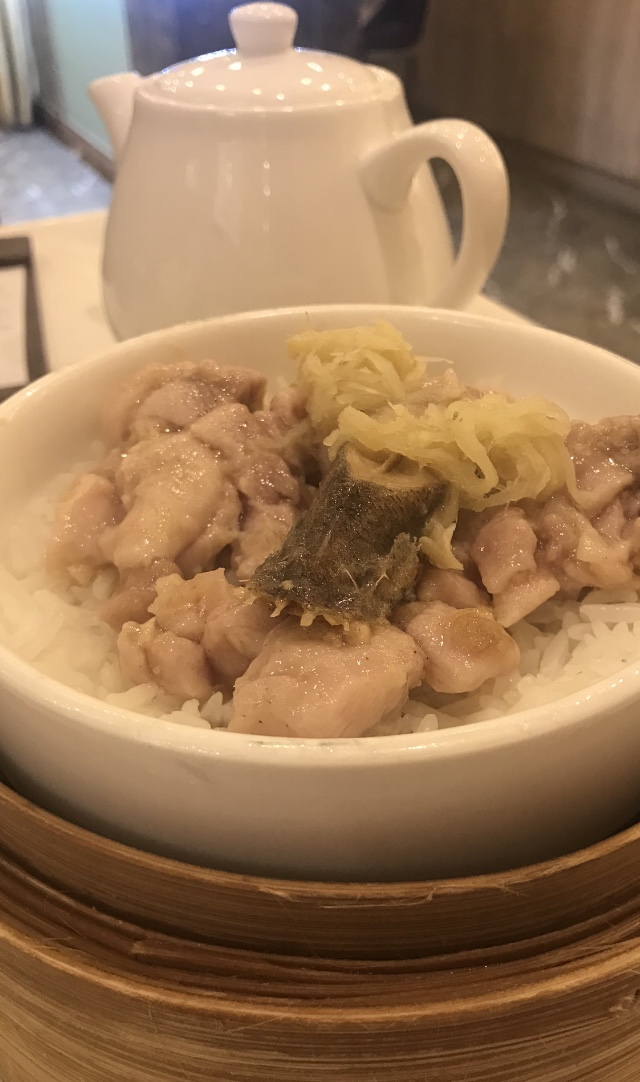
A Chinese dish with ginger slices. It shows the typical amount of ginger consumed each meal.

In Myanmar, ginger is called gyin. It is widely used in cooking and as a main ingredient in traditional medicines. It is consumed as a salad dish called gyin-thot, which consists of shredded ginger preserved in oil, with a variety of nuts and seeds. In Thailand where it is called ขิง khing, it is used to make a ginger garlic paste in cooking. In Indonesia, a beverage called wedang jahe is made from ginger and palm sugar. Indonesians also use ground ginger root, called jahe, as a common ingredient in local recipes. In Malaysia, ginger is called halia and used in many kinds of dishes, especially soups. Called luya in the Philippines, ginger is a common ingredient in local dishes and is brewed as a tea called salabat. In Vietnam, the fresh leaves, finely chopped, can be added to shrimp-and-yam soup (canh khoai mỡ) as a top garnish and spice to add a much subtler flavor of ginger than the chopped root. In China, sliced or whole ginger root is often paired with savory dishes such as fish, and chopped ginger root is commonly paired with meat, when it is cooked. Candied ginger is sometimes a component of Chinese candy boxes, and a herbal tea can be prepared from ginger. Raw ginger juice can be used to set milk and make a dessert, ginger milk curd.

==== North America ====
In the Caribbean, ginger is a popular spice for cooking and for making drinks such as sorrel, a drink made during the Christmas season. Jamaicans make ginger beer both as a carbonated beverage and also fresh in their homes. Ginger tea is often made from fresh ginger, as well as the famous regional specialty Jamaican ginger cake.

==== Western countries ====
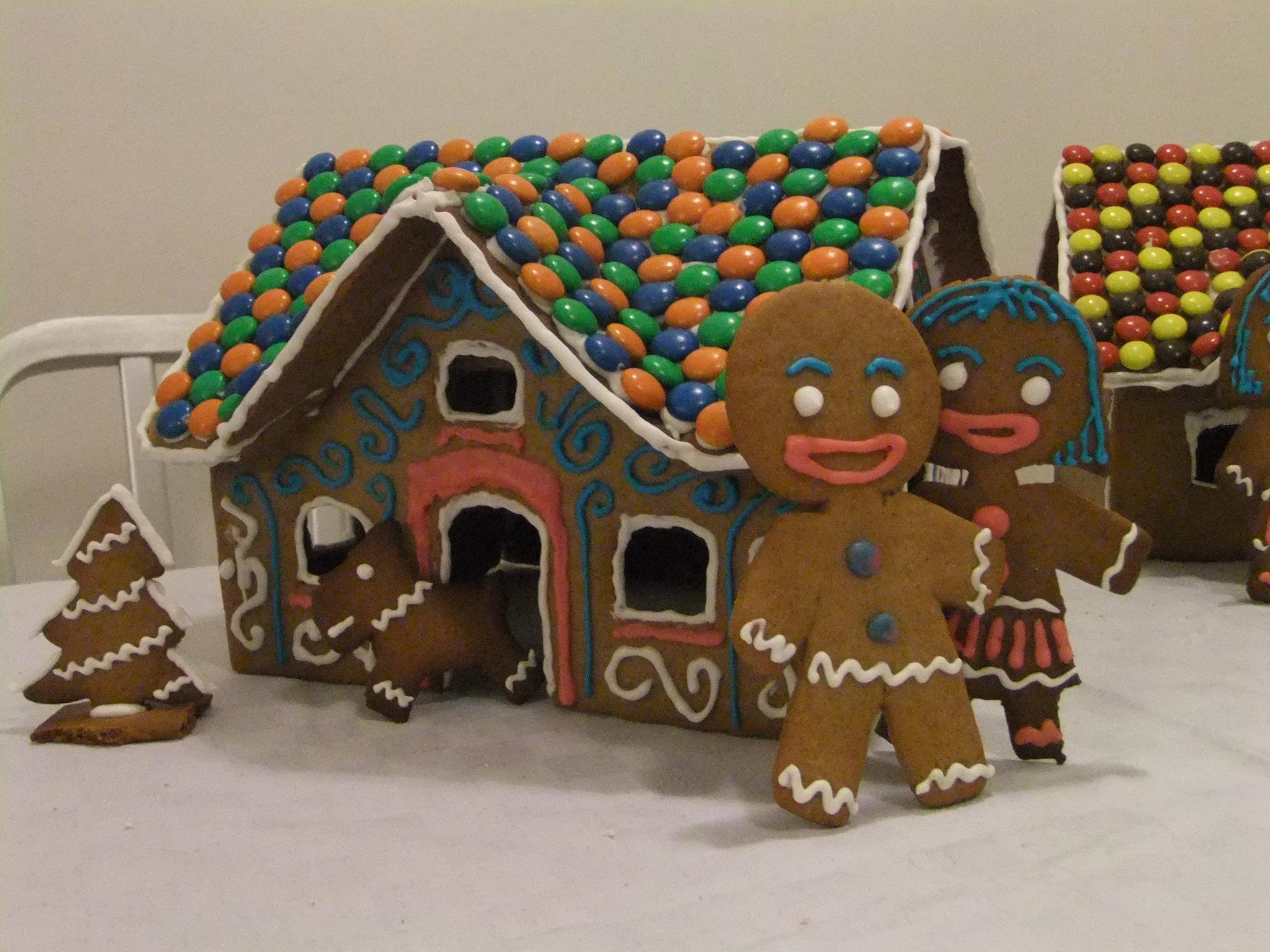
Gingerbread man and his wife with a gingerbread house

In Western cuisine, ginger is traditionally used mainly in sweet foods such as ginger ale, gingerbread, ginger snaps, parkin, and speculaas. A ginger-flavored liqueur called Canton is produced in Jarnac, France. Ginger wine is a ginger-flavoured wine produced in the United Kingdom, traditionally sold in a green glass bottle. Ginger is also used as a spice added to hot coffee and tea. On the island of Corfu, Greece, a traditional drink called τσιτσιμπύρα (tsitsibira), a type of ginger beer, is made. The people of Corfu and the rest of the Ionian islands adopted the drink from the British, during the period of the United States of the Ionian Islands.

Fresh ginger can be substituted for ground ginger at a ratio of six to one, although the flavours of fresh and dried ginger are somewhat different. Powdered dry ginger root is typically used as a flavouring for recipes such as gingerbread, cookies, crackers and cakes, ginger ale, and ginger beer. Candied or crystallized ginger, known in the UK as "stem ginger", is the root cooked in sugar until soft, and is a type of confectionery. Fresh ginger may be peeled before eating. For longer-term storage, the ginger can be placed in a plastic bag and refrigerated or frozen.

==== Middle East ====
Ginger is used in Iranian cuisine. Ginger bread is a kind of cookie traditionally prepared in the city of Gorgan on the holiday of Nowruz (New Year's Day).

=== Similar ingredients ===
Other members of the family Zingiberaceae are used in similar ways. They include the myoga (Zingiber mioga), the several types of galangal, the fingerroot (Boesenbergia rotunda), and the bitter ginger (Zingiber zerumbet).

A dicotyledonous native species of eastern North America, Asarum canadense, is also known as "wild ginger", and its root has similar aromatic properties, but it is not related to true ginger. The plant contains aristolochic acid, a carcinogenic compound. The United States Food and Drug Administration warns that consumption of aristolochic acid-containing products is associated with "permanent kidney damage, sometimes resulting in kidney failure that has required kidney dialysis or kidney transplantation. In addition, some patients have developed certain types of cancers, most often occurring in the urinary tract."

== Nutrition ==
Ginger root (raw)
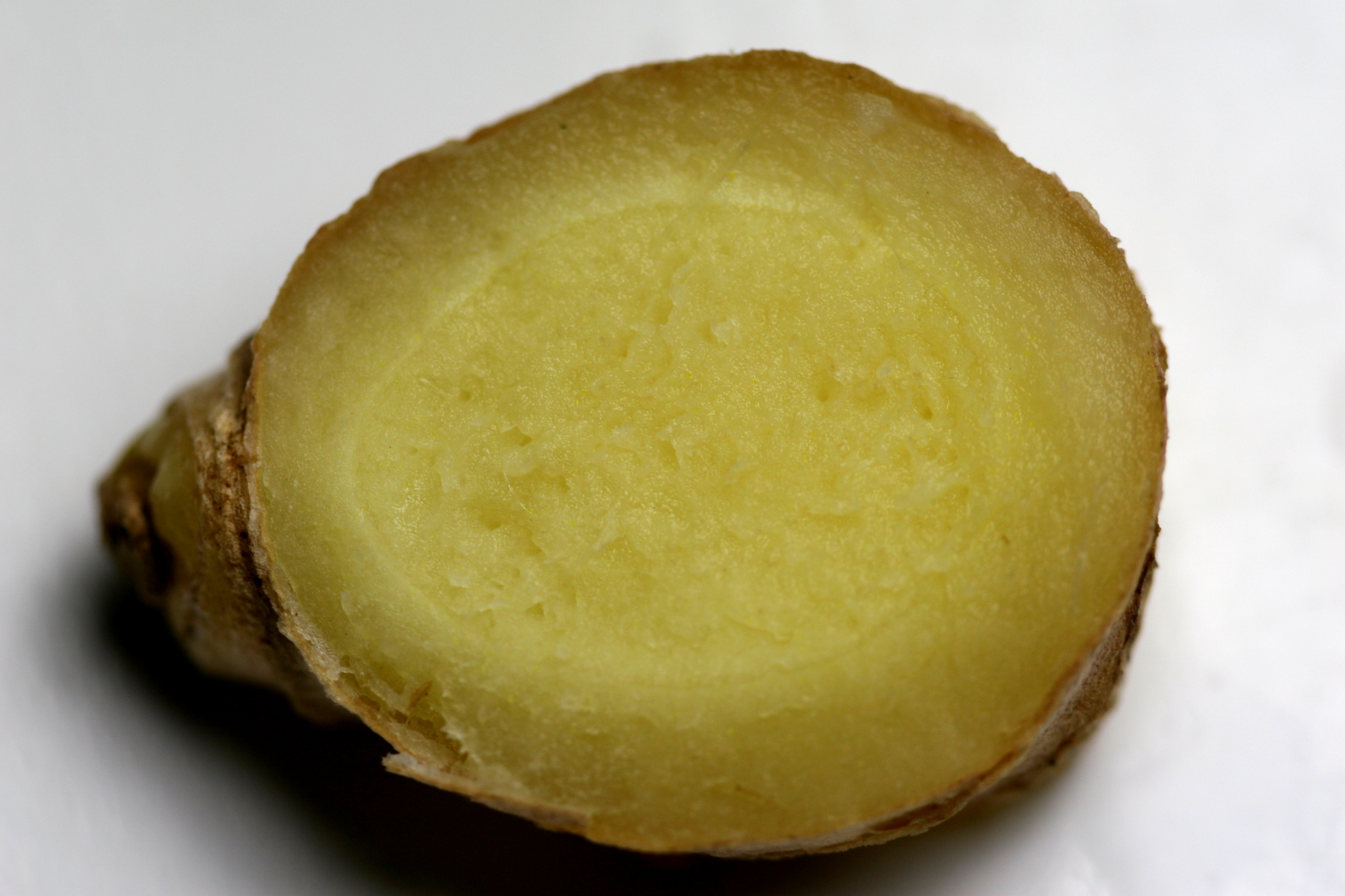
- Cross-section of ginger root

Nutritional value per 100 g (3.5 oz)
- Energy: 333 kJ (80 kcal)
- Carbohydrates: 17.77 g
- Sugars: 1.7 g
- Dietary fiber: 2 g
- Fat: 0.75 g
- Protein: 1.82 g
Vitamins and minerals
Vitamins	Quantity %DV^{†}
Thiamine (B1)	2% 0.025 mg
Riboflavin (B2)	3% 0.034 mg
Niacin (B3)	5% 0.75 mg
Pantothenic acid (B5)	4% 0.203 mg
Vitamin B6	9% 0.16 mg
Folate (B9)	3% 11 μg
Vitamin C	6% 5 mg
Vitamin E	2% 0.26 mg
Minerals	Quantity %DV^{†}
Calcium	1% 16 mg
Iron	3% 0.6 mg
Magnesium	10% 43 mg
Manganese	10% 0.229 mg
Phosphorus	3% 34 mg
Potassium	14% 415 mg
Sodium	1% 13 mg
Zinc	3% 0.34 mg
- Other constituents: Quantity
- Water: 79 g
- Full link to USDA Database entry
- ^{†}Percentages estimated using US recommendations for adults, except for potassium, which is estimated based on expert recommendation from the National Academies.

Raw ginger is 79% water, 18% carbohydrates, 2% protein, and 1% fat (table). In a reference amount of 100 g (3.5 oz), raw ginger supplies 333 kilojoules (80 kilocalories) of food energy and moderate amounts of potassium (14% of the Daily Value, DV), magnesium (10% DV) and manganese (10% DV), but otherwise is low in micronutrient content (table).

== Composition and safety ==
If consumed in reasonable quantities, ginger has few negative side effects, although large amounts may cause adverse events, such as gastrointestinal discomfort, and undesirable interactions with prescription drugs. It is on the FDA's "generally recognized as safe" list, though it does interact with some medications, including the anticoagulant drug warfarin and the cardiovascular drug nifedipine.

=== Chemistry ===
The characteristic fragrance and flavor of ginger result from volatile oils that compose 1–3% of the weight of fresh ginger, primarily consisting of sesquiterpenes, such as beta-bisabolene and zingiberene, zingerone, shogaols, and gingerols with [6]-gingerol (1-[4'-hydroxy-3'-methoxyphenyl]-5-hydroxy-3-decanone) as the major pungent compound. Some 400 chemical compounds exist in raw ginger.

Zingerone is produced from gingerols during drying, having lower pungency and a spicy-sweet aroma. Shogaols are more pungent, and are formed from gingerols during heating, storage or via acidity. Numerous monoterpenes, amino acids, dietary fiber, protein, phytosterols, vitamins, and dietary minerals are other constituents. Fresh ginger also contains an enzyme zingibain which is a cysteine protease and has similar properties to rennet.

== Research ==
Evidence that ginger use is associated with reduced nausea during pregnancy is of low quality. There is no good evidence ginger helps alleviate chemotherapy-induced nausea and vomiting.

There is no clear evidence that taking ginger to treat nausea during pregnancy is safe. Ginger is not effective for treating dysmenorrhea. There is some evidence for it having an anti-inflammatory effect, but insufficient evidence for it affecting pain in osteoarthritis. There is no good evidence that ginger affects platelet aggregation and blood clotting.

A 2018 review found evidence that ginger could decrease body weight in obese subjects and increase HDL-cholesterol.

== Adverse effects ==
Although generally recognized as safe, ginger can cause heartburn and other side effects, particularly if taken in powdered form. It may adversely affect individuals with gallstones, and may interfere with the effects of anticoagulants, such as warfarin or aspirin, and other prescription drugs.

== Gallery ==
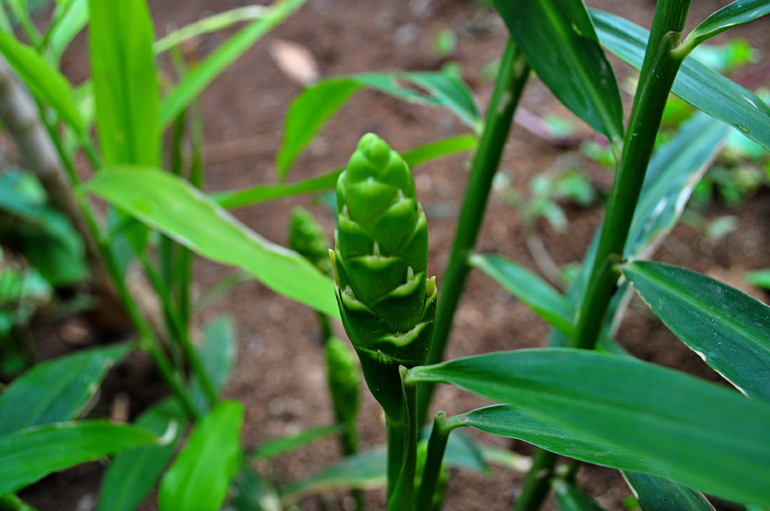
Ginger plant with flower

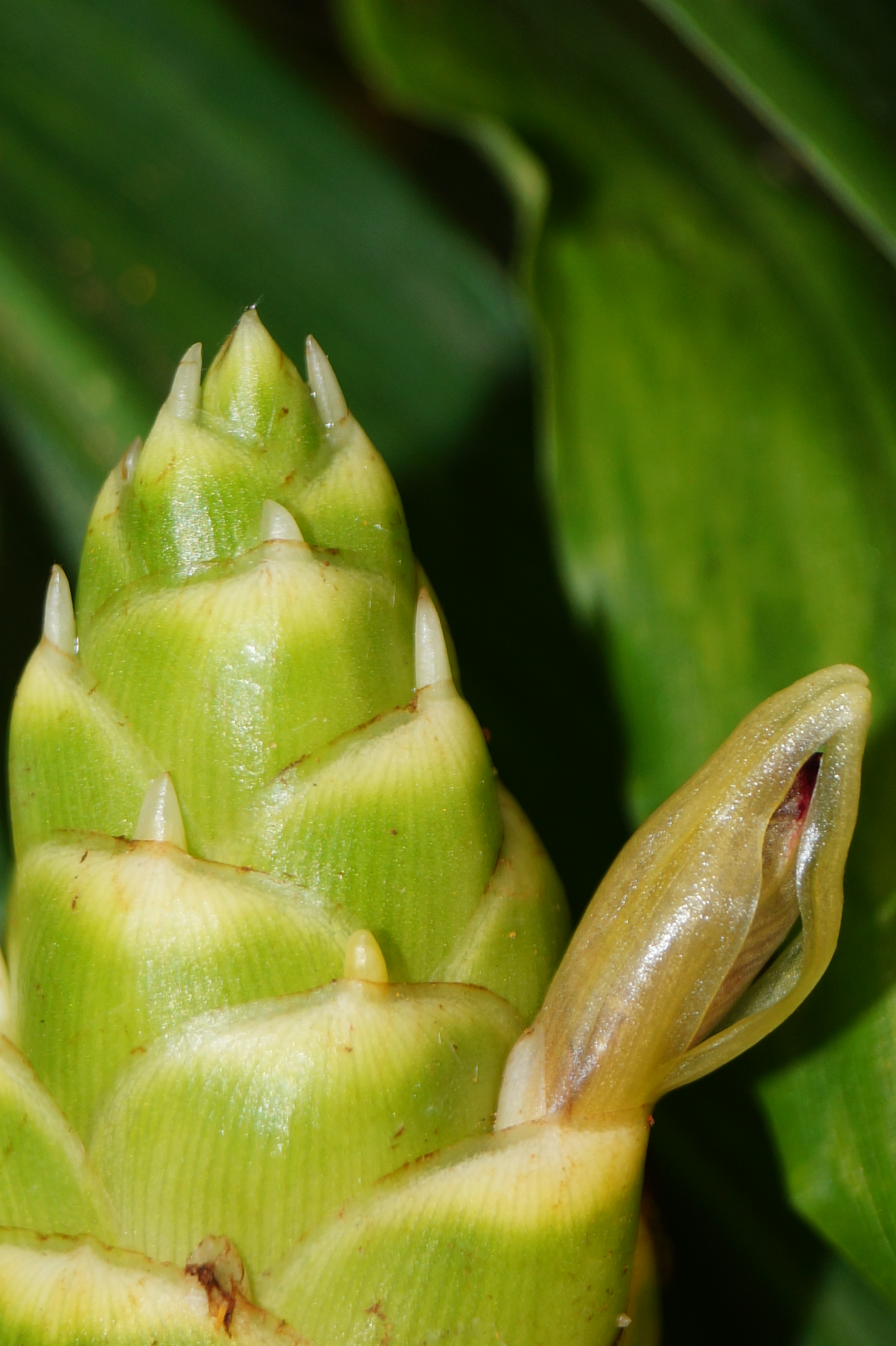
Ginger flower about to bloom

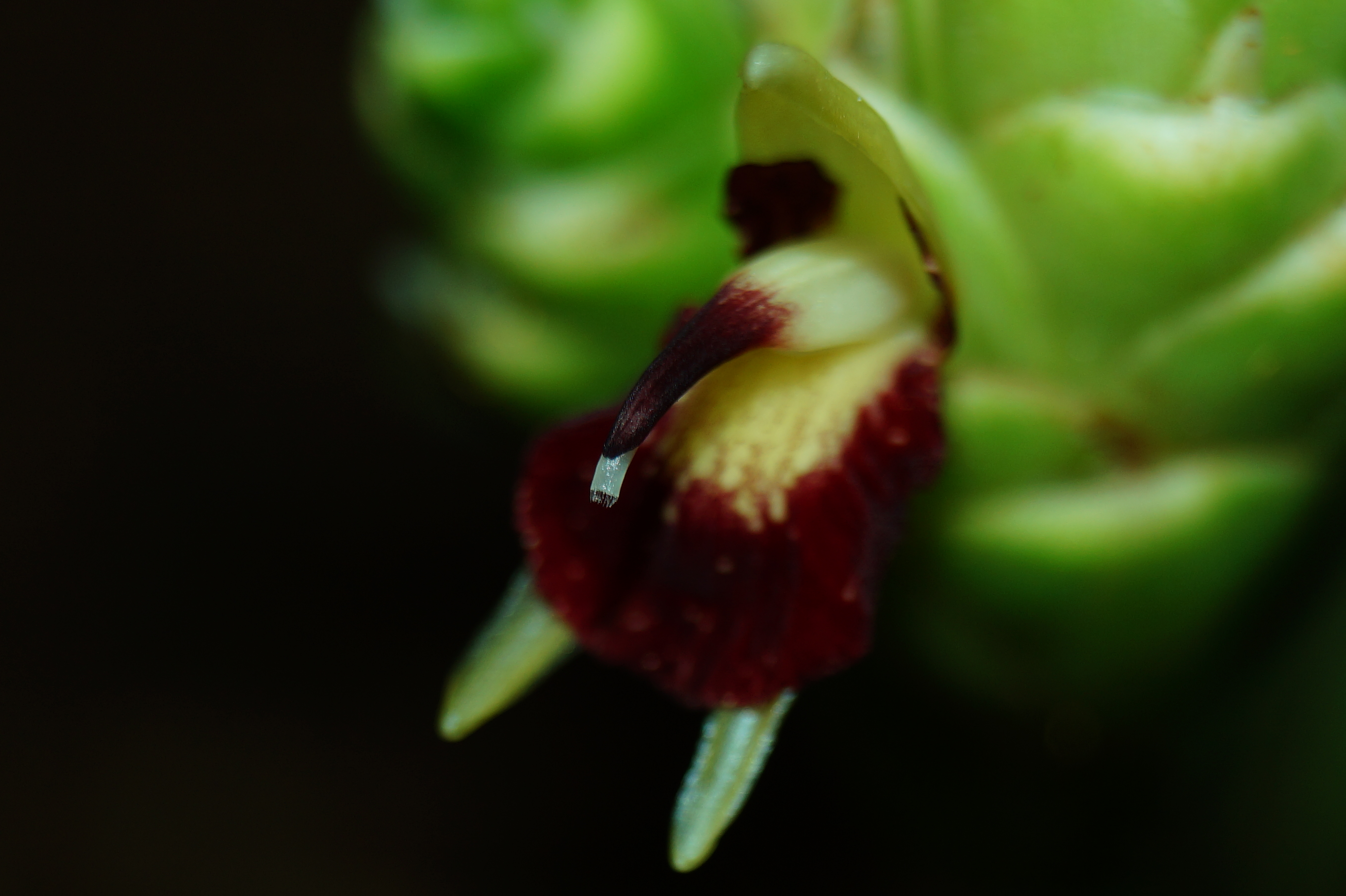
Ginger flower stamen

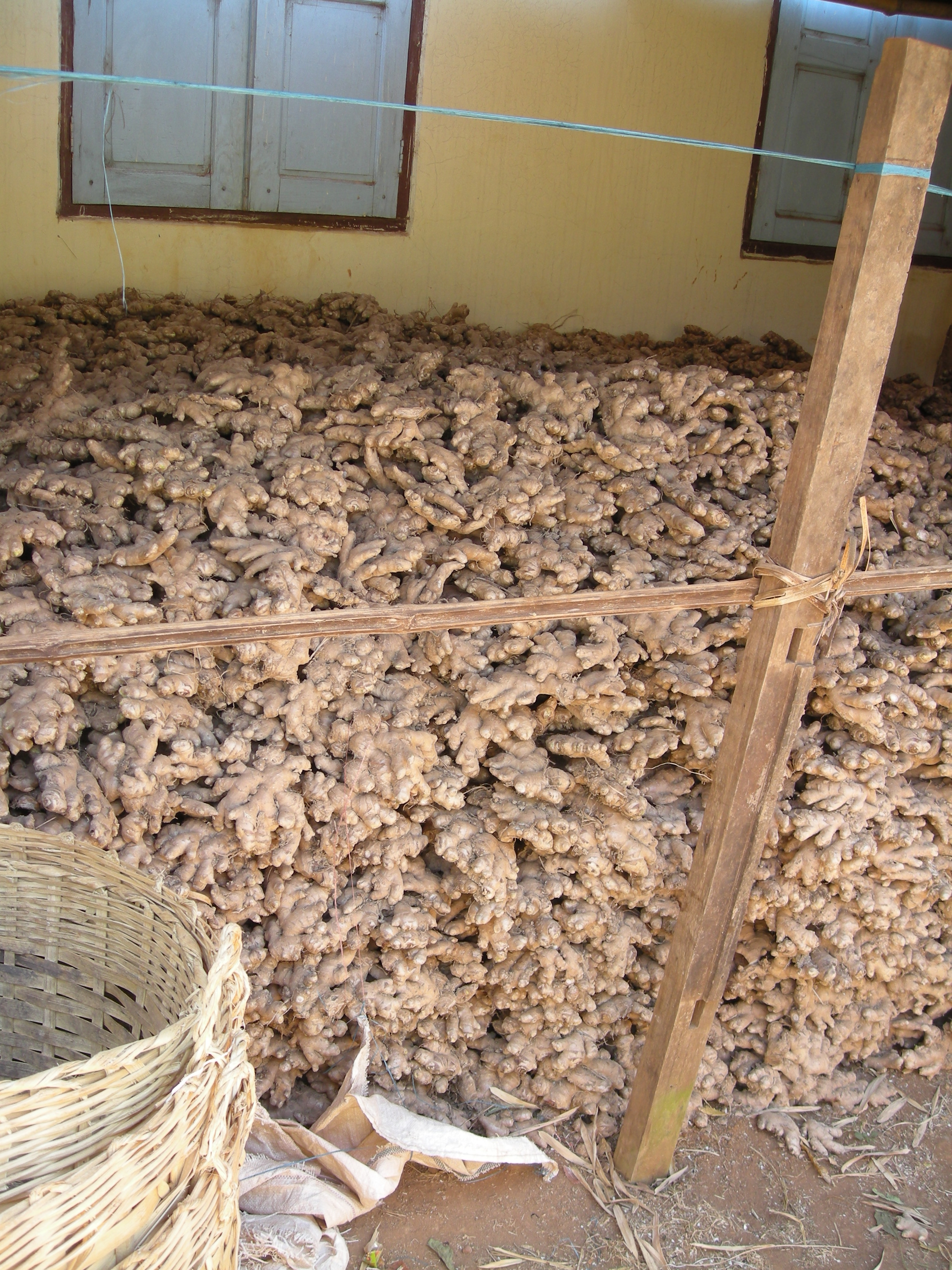
Ginger crop, Myanmar

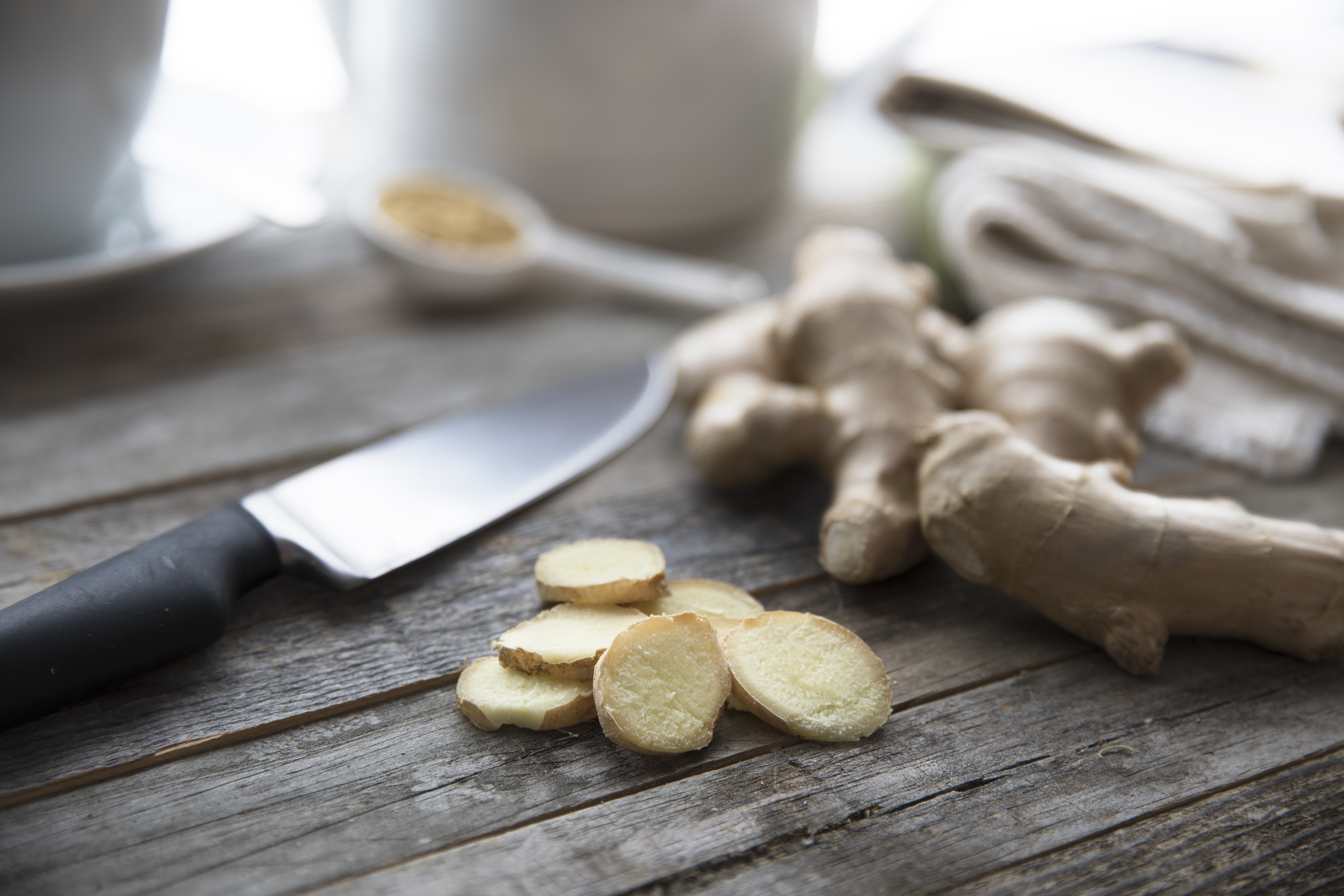
Chopped ginger

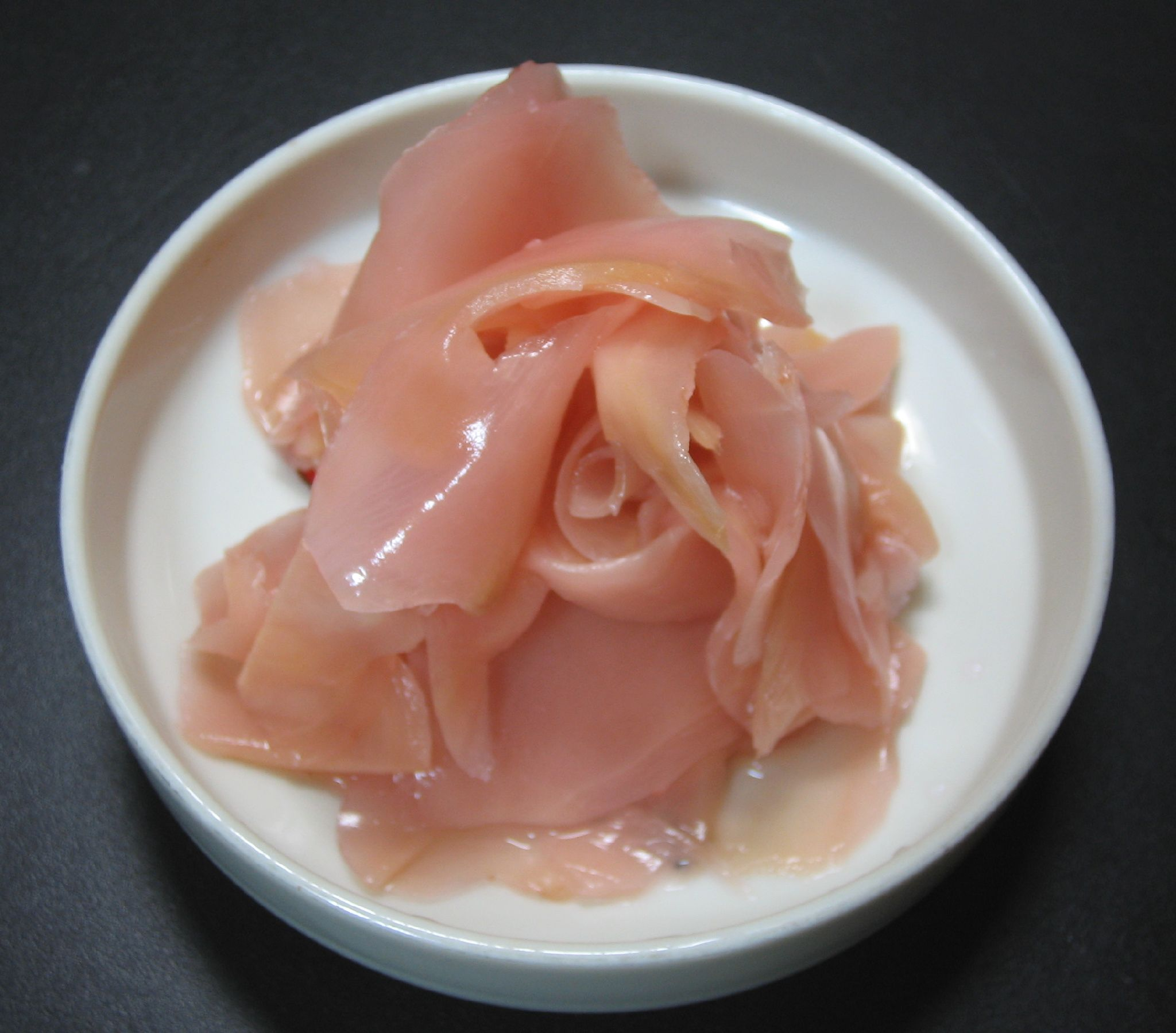
Gari, a type of pickled ginger

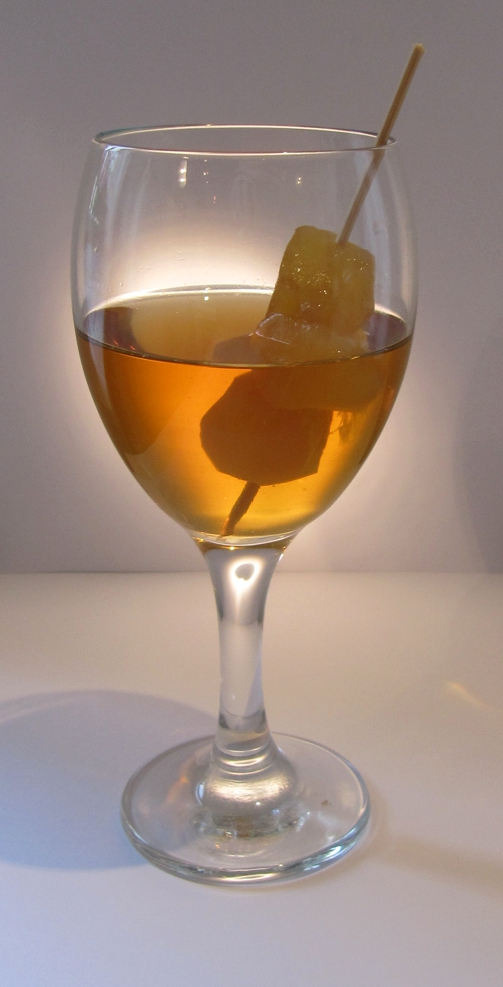
German ginger-flavored wine (grape-based) with stem ginger decoration

== See also ==
- Domesticated plants and animals of Austronesia
