= Ginger milk curd =

Chinese dessert

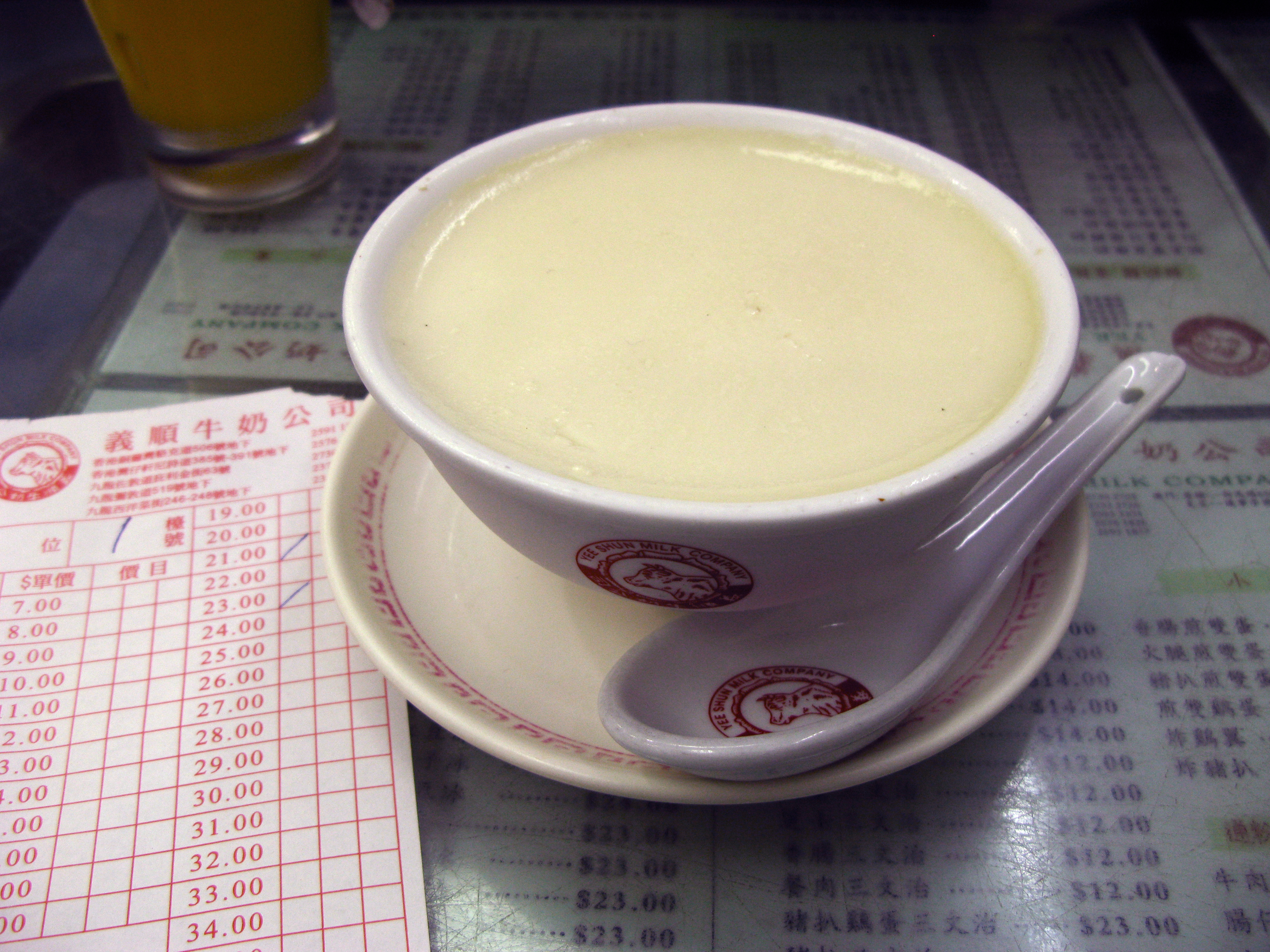
- Alternative names: Ginger-juice milk curd, ginger milk pudding, ginger milk
- Course: Dessert
- Place of origin: China
- Region or state: Shunde
- Main ingredients: Ginger, milk, sugar

Ginger milk curd
- Traditional Chinese: 薑汁撞奶
- Simplified Chinese: 姜汁撞奶
- Literal meaning: ginger juice collides with milk
Transcriptions
Yue: Cantonese
- Jyutping: goeng1 zap1 zong6 naai5

Ginger milk curd, also known as ginger-juice milk curd, ginger milk pudding or simply ginger milk, is a Chinese dessert originating from Shawan Ancient Town, Panyu District, Guangzhou in the Guangdong Province of southern China. The main ingredients are ginger, milk, and sugar. Water buffalo milk is traditionally used.

== Chemical reaction ==
Ginger milk curd's pudding-like trait is unique because it forms instantly when adding ginger juice to milk at an appropriate temperature in a static state.

The most important part of the ginger in ginger milk curd is the ginger protease zingibain. This substance with molecular weight of 31 kDa is found with three forms of isoelectric point that have very similar biochemical behavior. Their optimal proteolytic activity is 40–60 °C (104–140 °F) and maximum clotting activity at 70 °C (158 °F). However, clotting decreases significantly at temperatures of 75 °C (167 °F) or above.

Milk is a substance consisting mainly of milk fat globules and casein micelles in a continuous phase of water, sugar, whey protein and minerals. Casein micelles consist of mainly α(s1)-casein, α(s2)-casein, β-casein, and κ-casein, where hydrophobic α and β-casein are in the inner sub-micelle and hydrophilic κ-casein is in the outer part.

When the milk starts curdling, the curds are small, but as coagulation increases, curd size increases until the milk ends up with a tofu-like structure. When the curdling occurs, the ginger protease cuts open the κ-casein so that the hydrophilic C-terminus and the hydrophobic N-terminus separate. This disrupts the stability of the casein micelle. In the hydrophobic effect, the hydrophobic casein coagulates.

== Compounds ==
Ginger milk curd has its own unique volatile compounds, such as decanoic acid, γ-elemene, and caryophyllene. Decanoic acid is produced when the curd was formed. γ-Elemene contributed to the pungent fragrance and is an effective anti-cancer ingredient. Caryophyllene is anti-inflammatory and antifungal.

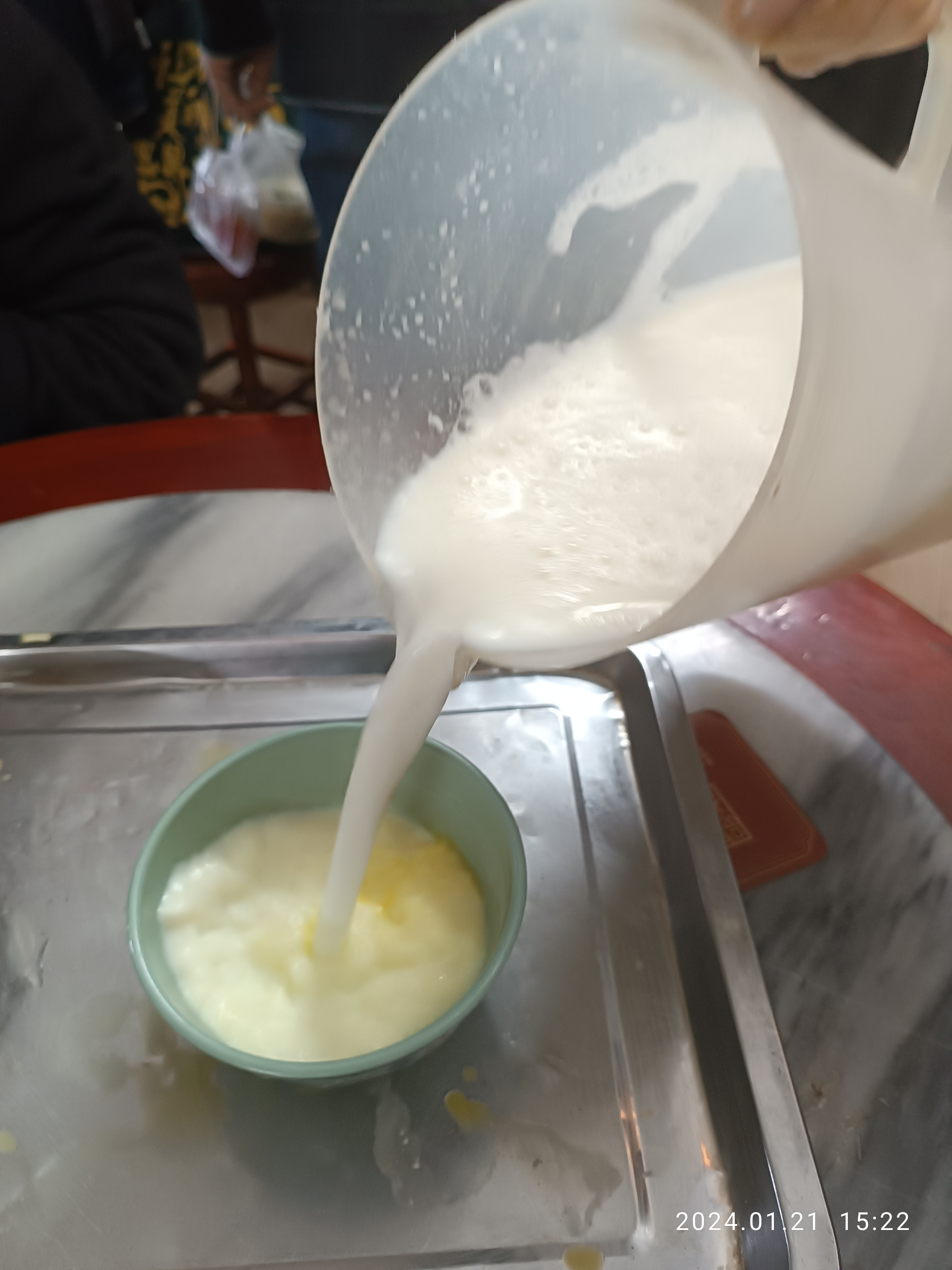
The authentic mixing requires pouring quickly from a height. This process is called "撞" in Chinese, directly translated to "clash".

== Cultural significance ==
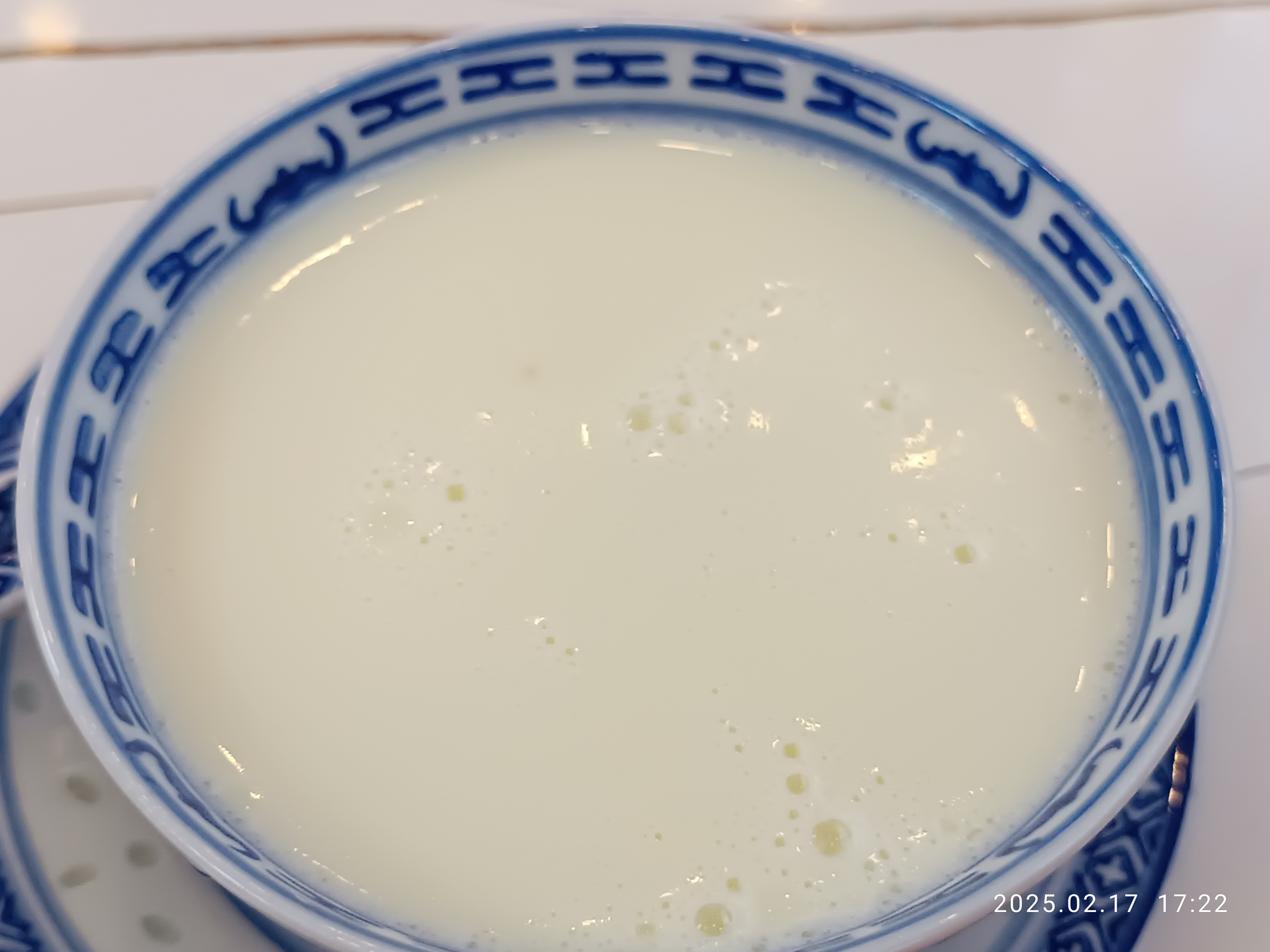
A bowl of ginger milk curd from a local shop in Zhongshan city, Guangdong, China.

Ginger milk curd is an essential component of the rich Cantonese dessert category. Its history, development, and production techniques all carry significant values from the Cantonese food culture and folk customs. It is associated with Cantonese traditions emphasizing wellness.

== See also ==
- Douhua
- Double skin milk
- Almond tofu
- Junket (dessert)
- List of Chinese desserts
- List of desserts
