= Shawan Ancient Town =

Historic town in Panyu, Guangzhou, China

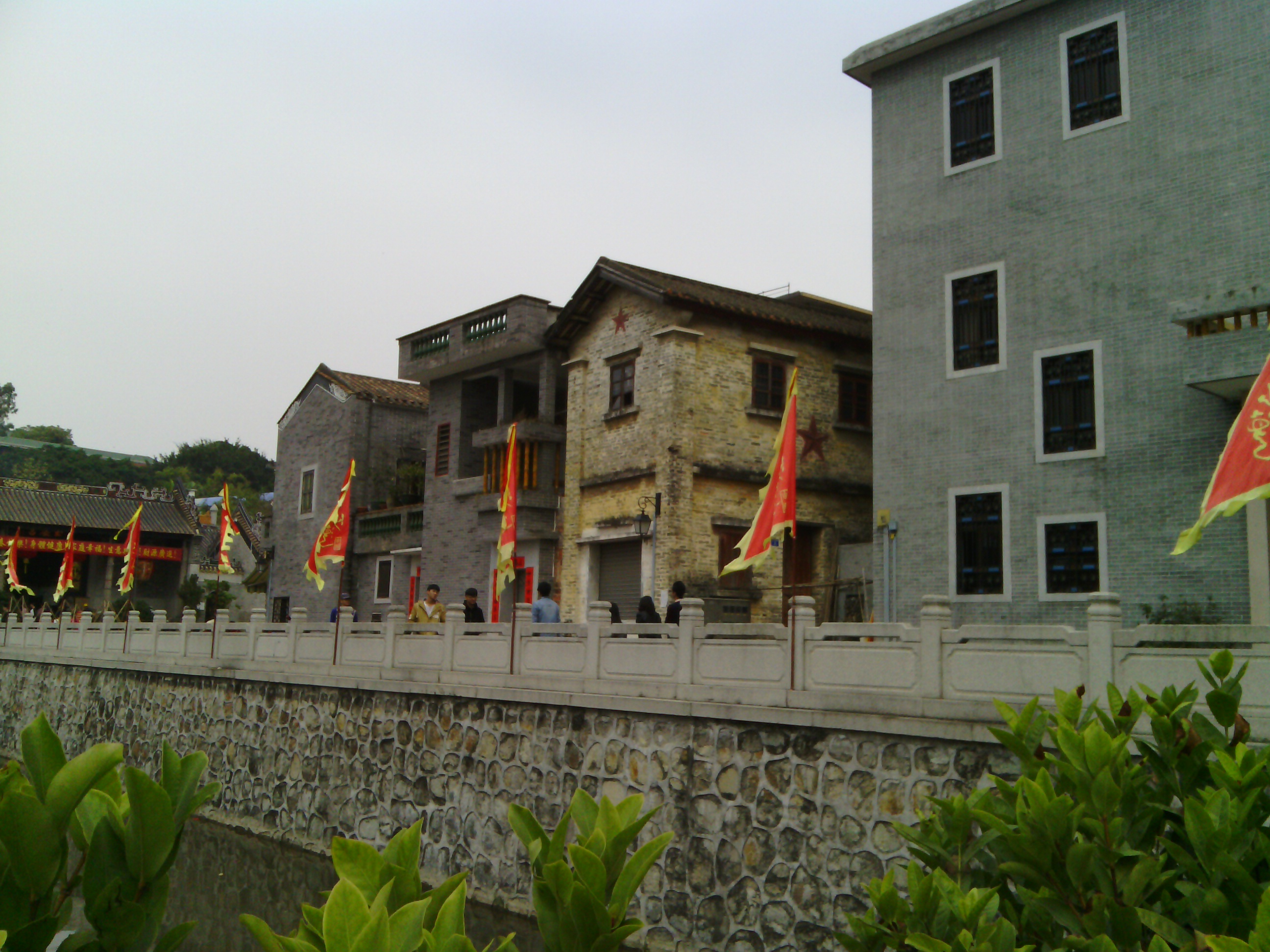
Shawan Ancient Town

Shawan Ancient Town (Chinese: 沙湾古镇) is an 800-year-old town located in the Panyu District of Guangzhou in southern China, founded during the Song dynasty. It is traditionally linked to the historical and folk Lingnan culture.

The town area covers 153 hectares; and it is divided into an east village, west village, and north village. Guangdong dessert jiang zhuang nai, a ginger-flavored milk curd, originated in Shawan.
