= Franz Koller =

Austrian politician

Franz Koller (born 6 May 1947 in Edlitz) is an Austrian farmer and politician (Freedom Party of Austria). Koller was a member of the National Council of Austria between 1996 and 1999 and afterwards until 2000 member of the Federal Council of Austria.

Koller attended elementary school between 1953 and 1961 and an agricultural school between 1964 and 1966. In 1966 Koller started to work as a farmer in the agriculture of his parents and did his military service between 1967 and 1968. Since 1975 Koller is working as an independent farmer.

Koller was from 1980 Member of the council of Grafendorf near Hartberg and was in 1982 elected as district party leader of the FPÖ Hartberg. Koller was Member of the National Council of Austria between 15 January 1996 and 28 October 1999, and member of the Federal Council of Austria between 16 November 1999 and 6 November 2000.
