= Jenny Thomann-Koller =

Swiss physician (1866–1949)

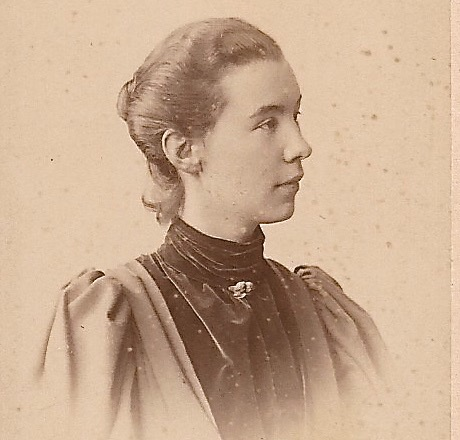
Jenny Thomann-Koller in c. 1895

Jenny Thomann-Koller (14 September 1866 – 5 February 1949) was a Swiss gynecologist and pediatrician. She was Head of Internal Medicine at the Schweizerische Pflegerinnenschule mit Spital (Swiss Nursing School with Hospital) in Zürich. In her dissertation, Beitrag zur Erblichkeitsstatistik der Geisteskranken im Ct. Zürich. Vergleichung derselben mit der erblichen Belastung gesunder Menschen u. dergl. (Contribution to the Statistics of Heritability of Mentally Ill People in the Canton of Zürich. Comparing these with the Hereditary Burden among Healthy People), published in 1895, she introduced a control group which challenged the then-popular theory of degeneration and eugenics.

== Life ==
Jenny Koller was born in Zürich, Switzerland on 14 September 1866. She was the second child of Konrad Adolf Koller, a horsehair manufacturer and businessman, and Katharina Huber.

As a gifted student, her ambition was to become a school teacher. Her forward-looking mother, however, suggested she study medicine. Her mother introduced Koller to Dr. Marie Heim-Vögtlin, the very first female physician in Switzerland. Dr. Heim-Vögtlin told Jenny about the difficulties she would face during her medical studies and her time as a physician, but also described the practice of medicine as very meaningful and rewarding. Convinced to study medicine, Koller enrolled in the Lehrerinnenseminar (teacher's college for women) in 1883–1887 and after passing the Maturitätsexamen (qualifying exam), she began her medical studies at the University of Zurich, which she completed in 1892.

Koller went on to an approximately seven-month internship at the Charité Hospital in Paris. Women in Switzerland were permitted to study medicine, but internships were generally denied to them. Once complete, she returned to Zürich where she worked as a substitute Assistenzärztin at the Rheinau Mental Asylum.

In 1893–1894, she opened her first private practice of Gynecology and Pediatrics. She published her dissertation in 1895, in the journal Archiv für Psychiatrie und Nervenkrankheiten. In the 1890s, she was associated with Swiss Association for Ethical Culture. Her name also appeared in 1902 among the members of the 'Association of Abstinent Physicians (Temperance Movement) of the German language areas'.

In 1901, Koller married Dr. Heinrich Thomann, director of the newly founded Statistical Bureau of the City of Zürich. They had three children: Heinrich, Jenny, and Felix. She continued her private medical practice and in addition, she began her long association with the Pflegerinnenschule mit Frauenspital in 1901. She had been a member of the planning committee since 1899 and was therefore closely associated with this pioneering undertaking. She would keep her position as departmental head physician for internal medicine until 1919.

In 1923 her husband suffered a stroke which affected his speech and cognitive ability. A second stroke in 1925 led to his death. She continued her large practice as Dr. Thomann-Koller on Schanzengasse 29 until 1933 and then on a smaller scale on Lintheschergasse until 1941. She spent her last years with her children and grandchildren and finally at the retirement home in Zürich.

== Women studying medicine in Switzerland ==
Jenny Koller pursued her unusual educational and career path together with three other Zürich women. Together they attended the Lehrerinnenseminar. From 1887 to 1892 they studied medicine at the University of Zurich, obtaining their medical degrees by passing the Staatsprüfung (state exam). Soon after, they earned their doctorates with Inaugural Dissertations and were promoted to Dr. med. Their friendship endured throughout their lifetimes. The three of them, Jenny Koller (after 1901 Thomann-Koller), Ida Schmid (after 1896 Hilfiker-Schmid), and Pauline Gottschall, established private practices in Zürich, which they maintained for over thirty years. The fourth, Josephina Theresia Zürcher (after 1899 Dr. Fallscheer-Zürcher), spent three decades as a physician in the Middle East, often in association with missionary hospitals and attending to the victims of the 1895 Armenian massacres. In addition to their remarkable careers, they published scientific articles and, although their positions as women physicians were neither secure nor privileged, they took a stand against the then widely accepted theory of degeneration, the rigid psychiatric categorization of mental illness, and the theory and practice of eugenics.

== Statistical study ==
In her dissertation, Beitrag zur Erblichkeitsstatistik der Geisteskranken im Ct. Zürich. Vergleichung derselben mit der erblichen Belastung gesunder Menschen durch Geistesstörungen u. dergl., Koller forged a new path. She was the first to introduce a control group of healthy people to be compared with the mentally ill into her study. Her results showed that the healthy group had a surprisingly high percentage of ancestors with mental illness. Her findings showed that "a full 59% of the healthy were hereditarily burdened", a number that was "not much lower than the hereditary figure for the mentally ill, and a proper statistical match [...] would narrow the divide". Koller therefore concluded that this “proved the effect of the regenerative factor.” With this assertion, she challenged the widely accepted theory of degeneration among psychiatrists (including her own professor Auguste Forel), and suggested a more sophisticated/differentiated diagnosis regarding the inheritability of mental illness. Ten years later, another Swiss, Otto Diem (1875–1950), confirmed Koller's results by way of his own equally careful but much more encompassing study.

For the next three decades, Koller's study (as well as Diem's, after 1905), became the subject of an intense discussion among renowned biologists and psychiatrists in journals, textbooks and international conferences. Among those who discussed Koller's findings were Korbinian Brodmann, Karl Jaspers, Julius Wagner von Jauregg, Emil Kraepelin, and Ernst Rüdin. Even the most recent scholarship on the history of statistics, eugenics and psychiatry refers to and acknowledges the significance of Jenny Koller's seminal study. Recently Katharina Banzhaf, Bernd Gausemeier, Theodore M. Porter and Kenneth Kendler, Astrid Klee have published on Koller's findings.

=== Private medical practice ===
Notwithstanding her intensive interest in and study of psychiatric questions and her clinical experience at the Mental Asylum Rheinau, Dr. Koller (after 1901 Dr. Thomann-Koller) decided to go into private practice in gynecology and pediatrics. Her very successful practices were located in Zürich (Dufourstrasse 47 (1893/94–1901), Seefeldstrasse 19 (1902–1909), Schanzengasse 29 (1910–1933) and Lintheschergasse 10 (until 1941). Initially quite timid, she quickly gained confidence and earned the trust of a large circle of patients and friends. Her concerns were not only with the medical problems of the patient but with the entire person. “She had a pronounced sense of the inner worth of an individual regardless of his or her social standing.” Moreover, she was intent on keeping up with medical improvements and to this effect, traveled to Berlin for a course on obstetrics.

=== Pflegerinnenschule ===
Dr. Jenny Thomann-Koller was one of three department heads in the Swiss Pflegerinnenschule mit Spital, the pioneering hospital and nursing school for women by women (1901–1998). Of these, Dr. Anna Heer was the director with a specialty in gynecology and obstetrics, Dr. Thomann-Koller's specialty was internal medicine, and Dr. Marie Heim-Vögtlin was in charge of the nursery and the postpartum patients. Their responsibilities included the care of patients within their department in conjunction with the in-house physician, mutual assistance during operations and on Sundays or holidays. Together with the matron, they formed the committee on admissions. All three physicians worked free of charge, with the exception of their private patients (who were insured). The original medical team remained the same until the First World War. But in 1914 the matron Ida Schneider left, Dr. Heim-Vögtlin retired in 1915; Dr. Heer died in 1918, and in 1919, Dr. Thomann-Koller took her leave. The ledgers, protocols, and journals of the gynecological and obstetric departments record the close and long-lasting association of Dr. Thomann-Koller with the "Pflegi". Reports or statements of a personal nature, however, are absent.

== Publication ==
- "Beitrag zur Erblichkeitsstatistik der Geisteskranken im Ct. Zürich. Vergleichung derselben mit der erblichen Belastung gesunder Menschen durch Geistesstörungen u. dergl." (A Contribution to the Statistics of Heritability in the Canton of Zürich. Comparison of these with the Hereditary Burden of Healthy People) in: Archiv für Psychiatrie und Nervenkrankheiten (Berlin, XXVII.1.1895), 268–295 (Digitized).

== Bibliography (selection) ==
- Katharina Banzhaf: Vorläufer der psychiatrischen Genetik: Die psychiatrische Erblichkeitsforschung in der deutschsprachigen Psychiatrie im Spiegel der Allgemeinen Zeitschrift für Psychiatrie, 1844–1911, Inauguraldissertation (Gießen, Universität Giessen 2014).
- Heidi Thomann Tewarson: Die ersten Zürcher Ärztinnen. Humanitäres Engagement und wissenschaftliche Arbeit zur Zeit der Eugenik. (Basel: Schwabe Verlag Basel 2018).
- Theodore M. Porter: Asylums of Hereditary Research in the Efficient Modern State, in: Müller- Wille, Staffan; Brandt, Christina (Hg.): Heredity Explored: Between Public Domain and Experimental Science (Cambridge/Mass., London 2016), 81–109.
- ____: Genetics in the Madhouse: The Unknown History of Human Heredity (Princeton: Princeton UP 2018).
- Kendler KS, Klee A. The turn to controls and the refinement of the concept of hereditary burden: The 1895 study of Jenny Koller. Am J Med Genet B Neuropsychiatr Genet. 2020 Oct;183(7):433-442. doi: 10.1002/ajmg.b.32819. Epub 2020 Aug 28. PMID 32856794.
- Bernd Gausemeier: Pedigree vs. Mendelism. Concepts of Heredity in Psychiatry before and after 1900, in: Max-Planck-Institut für die Wissenschaftsgeschichte. 2008, Preprint 343 (Conference: A Cultural History of Heredity IV: Heredity in the Century of the Gene), 149 –162.
- Sylvia Baumann Kurer: Die Gründung der Schweizerischen Pflegerinnenschule mit Frauenspital in Zürich 1901 und ihre Chefärztin Anna Heer (1863–1918) (Zürich: Juris Druck + Verlag Zürich 1991).
- Hans Jakob Ritter: Von den Irrenstatistiken zur «erblichen Belastung» der Bevölkerung. Die Entwicklung der Schweizerischen Irrenstatistiken zwischen 1850 und 1914. In: Traverse. Vol. 10 (2003), p. 59–70, doi:10.5169/seals-23617, here p. 66 (Digitized).
