= Jeff Shawan =

American politician

Member of the Missouri House of Representatives from the 153rd district
- In office 2019–2021
- Preceded by: Steve Cookson
- Succeeded by: Darrell Atchison

Personal details
- Born: 1956 or 1957 (age 69–70) Cape Girardeau, Missouri, U.S.
- Party: Republican
- Spouse: Christy Shawan
- Children: 3

Jeff Shawan (born 1956) is an American politician who served as a member of the Missouri House of Representatives for the 153rd district from 2019 to 2021. He is a member of the Republican Party. In 2020, Shawan did not run for re-election in the House of Representatives.
