= Don Koller =

American politician (born 1942)

Member of the Missouri House of Representatives from the 153rd district
- In office 1984–2002

Personal details
- Born: December 3, 1942 Granite City, Illinois
- Party: Democratic

Don Koller (born December 3, 1942) is an American Democratic politician who served in the Missouri House of Representatives.

== Biography ==
Born in Granite City, Illinois, Koller graduated from Summersville High School in Summersville, Missouri, and a trade school in Toledo, Ohio. He served 18 years in the Missouri House of Representatives.
