= 1991–92 Cardiff City F.C. season =

Welsh football club season

Cardiff City
1991–92 season
- Owner: Rick Wright
- Manager: Eddie May
- Football League Fourth Division: 9th
- FA Cup: 1st round
- League Cup: 1st round
- Welsh Cup: Winners
- Autoglass Trophy: 1st round
- Top goalscorer: League: Carl Dale (22); All: Carl Dale & Chris Pike (28)
- Highest home attendance: 16,030 (v Burnley, 29 February 1992)
- Lowest home attendance: 2,356 (v Scunthorpe, 2 November 1991)
- Average home league attendance: 5,665
Home colours

The 1991–92 season was Cardiff City F.C.'s 65th season in the Football League. They competed in the 24-team Division Four, then the fourth tier of English football, finishing ninth.

== Players ==
First team squad. Note: Flags indicate national team as defined under FIFA eligibility rules; some limited exceptions apply. Players may hold more than one non-FIFA nationality.

Pos.	Nation	Player
GK	ENG	Roger Hansbury
GK	ENG	Gavin Ward
DF	WAL	Gareth Abraham
DF	WAL	Lee Baddeley
DF	ENG	Gary Bellamy
DF	WAL	Andy Gorman
DF	ENG	Gerry Harrison
DF	WAL	Allan Lewis
DF	NIR	Neil Matthews
DF	WAL	Jason Perry
DF	WAL	Damon Searle
DF	ENG	Jamie Unsworth
DF	ENG	John Williams
MF	ENG	Cliff Carr
MF	ENG	Gary Gill

Pos.	Nation	Player
MF	GUY	Cohen Griffith
MF	ENG	Pat Heard
MF	ENG	Mark Jones
MF	SCO	Kevin MacDonald
MF	NIR	Paul Millar
MF	NIR	Paul Ramsey
MF	ENG	Eddie Newton
FW	WAL	Nathan Blake
FW	WAL	Carl Dale
FW	ENG	Paul Marriott
FW	WAL	Chris Pike
FW	ENG	Robin Semark
FW	WAL	Cameron Toshack
FW	ENG	Alan Walsh

== Standings ==
Pos	Team	Pld	W	D	L	GF	GA	GD	Pts	Promotion or relegation
7	Barnet	42	21	6	15	81	61	+20	69	Qualification for the Fourth Division play-offs
8	Rochdale	42	18	13	11	57	53	+4	67	Qualification for the Third Division (Note: From the 1992–93 season, the third tier - then known as the Third Division - was renamed to the Second Division, and the fourth tier - then known as the Fourth Division - was renamed to the Third Division.)
9	Cardiff City	42	17	15	10	66	53	+13	66	Qualification for the European Cup Winners' Cup first round and qualification for the Third Division
10	Lincoln City	42	17	11	14	50	44	+6	62	Qualification for the Third Division
11	Gillingham	42	15	12	15	63	53	+10	57	Qualification for the Third Division

=== Results by round ===
Round	1	2	3	4	5	6	7	8	9	10	11	12	13	14	15	16	17	18	19	20	21	22	23	24	25	26	27	28	29	30	31	32	33	34	35	36	37	38	39	40	41	42
Ground	H	A	H	A	H	A	A	H	A	H	A	H	H	A	H	H	A	A	A	H	H	A	H	H	A	A	H	A	H	H	A	H	A	A	H	A	H	A	H	A	A	H
Result	L	D	W	D	L	D	D	W	L	W	L	W	D	D	W	W	W	D	D	L	W	D	W	W	W	W	W	D	L	W	D	L	L	D	D	L	W	D	W	L	W	D
Position	~	~	11	11	15	15	15	12	14	13	12	12	12	12	10	10	7	9	9	9	9	9	8	8	7	6	5	5	7	6	6	7	8	7	7	7	9	9	9	9	9	9
Points	0	1	4	5	5	6	7	10	10	13	13	16	17	18	21	24	27	28	29	29	32	33	36	39	42	45	48	49	49	52	53	53	53	54	55	55	58	59	62	62	65	66

A = Away; H = Home; W = Win; D = Draw; L = Loss

== Fixtures and results ==
=== Fourth Division ===
17 August 1991 1	Cardiff City	1–2	Lincoln City	Cardiff
15:00	Chris Pike (pen.)		(pen.) Matt Carmichael; Paul Dobson	Stadium: Ninian Park; Attendance: 5,137

24 August 1991 2	Crewe Alexandra	1–1	Cardiff City	Crewe
15:00	Aidan Murphy		Carl Dale	Stadium: Gresty Road; Attendance: 3,799

31 August 1991 3	Cardiff City	1–0	Carlisle United	Cardiff
15:00	Mark Jones (pen.)			Stadium: Ninian Park; Attendance: 4,096

4 September 1991 4	Maidstone United	1–1	Cardiff City	Dartford
20:00	Steve Cuggy (pen.)		Carl Dale	Stadium: Watling Street; Attendance: 1,019

7 September 1991 5	Cardiff City	1–2	Rochdale	Cardiff
15:00	Chris Pike 64'		41' John Ryan; 90' Alan Reeves	Stadium: Ninian Park; Attendance: 4,029; Referee: Paul Durkin (Dorset)

14 September 1991 6	Blackpool	1–1	Cardiff City	Blackpool
15:00	Phil Horner		(o.g.) Mike Davies	Stadium: Bloomfield Road; Attendance: 3,931

18 September 1991 7	Halifax Town	1–1	Cardiff City	Halifax
19:30	Russell Bradley		Carl Dale	Stadium: The Shay; Attendance: 1,041

21 September 1991 8	Cardiff City	2–1	Scarborough	Cardiff
15:00	Pat Heard; Carl Dale		John Ashdjian	Stadium: Ninian Park; Attendance: 3,227

28 September 1991 9	Barnet	3–1	Cardiff City	Chipping Barnet
15:00	Paul Showler; Gary Bull; Gary Bull (pen.)		Carl Dale	Stadium: Underhill Stadium; Attendance: 4,000

5 October 1991 10	Cardiff City	5–0	Wrexham	Cardiff
15:00	Carl Dale 17'; Nathan Blake 32'; Chris Pike 53', 80', 83'	Wrexham report		Stadium: Ninian Park; Attendance: 3,652; Referee: Mike James

19 October 1991 11	Mansfield Town	3–0	Cardiff City	Mansfield
15:00	Greg Fee; Steve Wilkinson; Steve Charles			Stadium: Field Mill; Attendance: 3,180

26 October 1991 12	Cardiff City	2–1	Doncaster Rovers	Cardiff
15:00	Chris Pike (pen.); Chris Pike (pen.)		Eddie Gormley	Stadium: Ninian Park; Attendance: 2,591

2 November 1991 13	Cardiff City	2–2	Scunthorpe United	Cardiff
15:00	Carl Dale; Chris Pike		David Hill (o.g.) Chris Pike	Stadium: Ninian Park; Attendance: 2,356

5 November 1991 14	Gillingham	0–0	Cardiff City	Gillingham
19:45		Gillingham report		Stadium: Priestfield Stadium; Attendance: 2,641; Referee: David Axcell (Southend)

23 November 1991 15	Cardiff City	3–2	Northampton Town	Cardiff
15:00	Roger Gibbins; Carl Dale; Carl Dale		Jason Burnham; Jason Burnham	Stadium: Ninian Park; Attendance: 2,922

30 November 1991 16	Cardiff City	1–0	Rotherham United	Cardiff
15:00	Carl Dale			Stadium: Ninian Park; Attendance: 3,551

14 December 1991 17	York City	1–3	Cardiff City	York
15:00	Tony Canham		Chris Pike; Carl Dale; Carl Dale	Stadium: Bootham Crescent; Attendance: 1,904

26 December 1991 18	Lincoln City	0–0	Cardiff City	Lincoln
15:00				Stadium: Sincil Bank; Attendance: 3,162

28 December 1991 19	Carlisle United	2–2	Cardiff City	Carlisle
15:00	Andy Watson; Simon Jeffels		Chris Pike (pen.) Paul Ramsey	Stadium: Brunton Park; Attendance: 3,080

1 January 1992 20	Cardiff City	0–5	Maidstone United	Cardiff
15:00	John Williams (red card)		(pen.) Liburd Henry; Robbie Painter; Gary Stebbing; Bradley Sandeman; Mark Smalley	Stadium: Ninian Park; Attendance: 8,023

11 January 1992 21	Cardiff City	1–0	Hereford United	Cardiff
15:00	Carl Dale 90'			Stadium: Ninian Park; Attendance: 5,305

18 January 1992 22	Walsall	0–0	Cardiff City	Walsall
15:00				Stadium: Bescot Stadium; Attendance: 3,654

25 January 1992 23	Cardiff City	4–0	Chesterfield	Cardiff
15:00	Chris Pike; Chris Pike; Carl Dale; Nathan Blake			Stadium: Ninian Park; Attendance: 5,131

31 January 1992 24	Cardiff City	3–2	Mansfield Town	Cardiff
19:30	Nathan Blake; Chris Pike (pen.); Eddie Newton		Paul McLoughlin; Phil Stant	Stadium: Ninian Park; Attendance: 8,201

8 February 1992 25	Doncaster Rovers	1–2	Cardiff City	Doncaster
15:00	Kevin Noteman		Carl Dale (o.g.) Colin Douglas	Stadium: Belle Vue; Attendance: 2,094

11 February 1992 26	Rotherham United	1–2	Cardiff City	Rotherham
19:30	Desmond Hazel		Eddie Newton; Nathan Blake	Stadium: Millmoor; Attendance: 3,827

15 February 1992 27	Cardiff City	3–0	York City	Cardiff
15:00	Chris Pike; Chris Pike (pen.); Carl Dale			Stadium: Ninian Park; Attendance: 8,067

22 February 1992 28	Hereford United	2–2	Cardiff City	Hereford
	Simon Brain; Chris Fry		Paul Ramsey; Gerry Harrison	Stadium: Edgar Street; Attendance: 5,691

29 February 1992 29	Cardiff City	0–2	Burnley	Cardiff
15:00			85' Adrian Randall; 89' Mike Conroy	Stadium: Ninian Park; Attendance: 16,030; Referee: John Martin (Alton, Hampshire)

3 March 1992 30	Cardiff City	2–1	Walsall	Cardiff
19:30	Carl Dale; Damon Searle		(o.g.) Jason Perry	Stadium: Ninian Park; Attendance: 7,517

7 March 1992 31	Chesterfield	2–2	Cardiff City	Chesterfield
	Steve Norris; Sean Dyche		Eddie Newton; Carl Dale	Stadium: Saltergate; Attendance: 3,803

10 March 1992 32	Cardiff City	2–3	Gillingham	Cardiff
19:30	Cohen Griffith 23'; Carl Dale 41'	Gillingham report	11', 48' Richard Green; 79' David Crown	Stadium: Ninian Park; Attendance: 8,521; Referee: Vic Callow (Solihull)

14 March 1992 33	Scunthorpe United	1–0	Cardiff City	Scunthorpe
15:00	John Buckley			Stadium: Glanford Park; Attendance: 2,766

28 March 1992 34	Northampton Town	0–0	Cardiff City	Northampton
15:00				Stadium: County Ground; Attendance: 2,678

31 March 1992 35	Cardiff City	1–1	Blackpool	Cardiff
19:30	Dave Burgess (o.g.)		Dave Bamber	Stadium: Ninian Park; Attendance: 8,430

4 April 1992 36	Rochdale	2–0	Cardiff City	Rochdale
15:00	Alan Reeves 24'; Andy Milner 84'			Stadium: Spotland; Attendance: 2,650; Referee: Andrew Bennett (Woking)

11 April 1992 37	Cardiff City	4–0	Halifax Town	Cardiff
19:30	Paul Ramsey (pen.); Carl Dale; Carl Dale; Chris Pike			Stadium: Ninian Park; Attendance: 5,261

14 April 1992 38	Scarborough	2–2	Cardiff City	Scarborough, North Yorkshire
19:30	Ricardo Gabbiadini; Chris Curran		Chris Pike; Chris Pike	Stadium: Athletic Ground; Attendance: 935

20 April 1992 39	Cardiff City	3–1	Barnet	Cardiff
15:00	Chris Pike (pen.); Carl Dale; Eddie Newton		Geoff Cooper	Stadium: Ninian Park; Attendance: 7,720

22 April 1992 40	Burnley	3–1	Cardiff City	Burnley
19:30	Robbie Painter 1'; Andy Farrell 60'; Mike Conroy 63'		29' Nathan Blake	Stadium: Turf Moor; Attendance: 12,408; Referee: George Courtney (Spennymoor)

25 April 1992 41	Wrexham	0–3	Cardiff City	Wrexham
15:00		Wrexham report	16', 19' Chris Pike; 76' Gary Gill	Stadium: The Racecourse; Attendance: 4,002; Referee: Ray Shepherd

28 April 1992 42	Cardiff City	1–1	Crewe Alexandra	Cardiff
19:30	Nathan Blake		Steve Macauley	Stadium: Ninian Park; Attendance: 10,523

=== League Cup ===
21 August 1991 Round 1 (First leg)	Cardiff City	3–2	Bournemouth	Cardiff
19:30	Paul Millar; Roger Gibbins; Damon Searle		Paul Morrell; Richard Cooke	Stadium: Ninian Park; Attendance: 3,439; Referee: David Shadwell (West Bromwich)

27 August 1991 Round 1 (Second leg)	Bournemouth	4–1 (6–4 agg.)	Cardiff City	Bournemouth
19:45	Andy Jones; Andy Jones; Jimmy Quinn; Alex Watson		(pen.) Mark Jones	Stadium: Dean Court; Attendance: 4,849

=== FA Cup ===
16 November 1991 Round 1	Swansea City	2–1	Cardiff City	Swansea
15:00	Jimmy Gilligan; Mark Harris		Chris Pike	Stadium: Vetch Field; Attendance: 9,315

=== Welsh Cup ===
29 October 1991 Round 3	Cardiff City	3–0	Newport AFC	Cardiff
19:30	Chris Pike; Cohen Griffith; Carl Dale			Stadium: Ninian Park; Attendance: 2,423

7 December 1991 Round 4	Cardiff City	3–3	Stourbridge	Cardiff
15:00	Chris Pike; Chris Pike; Chris Pike (pen.)		Goal	Stadium: Ninian Park; Attendance: 1,495

17 December 1991 Round 4 (Replay)	Stourbridge	1–2	Cardiff City	Stourbridge
19:30	Goal		Cohen Griffith; Carl Dale	Stadium: War Memorial Athletic Ground; Attendance: 1,007; Referee: Keith Cooper (Pontypridd)

19 February 1992 Round 5	Swansea City	0–1	Cardiff City	Swansea
19:30			Chris Pike	Stadium: Vetch Field; Attendance: 7,303

24 March 1992 Semi Final (First leg)	Cardiff City	0–0	Maesteg Park Athletic	Cardiff
19:30				Stadium: Ninian Park; Attendance: 3,508

18 April 1992 Semi Final (Second leg)	Maesteg Park Athletic	0–4 (0–4 agg.)	Cardiff City	Cardiff
15:00			Llewellyn (o.g.); Carl Dale; Damon Searle; Mark Jones	Stadium: Ninian Park; Attendance: 3,578
Note: Maesteg waived their home advantage and played the game at Ninian Park

7 May 1992 Final	Cardiff City	1–0	Hednesford Town	Cardiff
19:30	Carl Dale			Stadium: National Stadium; Attendance: 12,000; Referee: Howard King (Merthyr Tydfil)

=== Autoglass Trophy ===
19 November 1991 Preliminary round	Swansea City	0–0	Cardiff City	Swansea
19:30				Stadium: Vetch Field; Attendance: 2,955

10 December 1991 Preliminary round	Cardiff City	3–3	Bournemouth	Cardiff
19:30	Carl Dale; Carl Dale; Chris Pike		Denny Mundee; Efan Ekoku; Jimmy Quinn	Stadium: Ninian Park; Attendance: 1,337; Referee: Gurnham Singh (Wolverhampton)

14 January 1992 Round 1	Stoke City	3–0	Cardiff City	Stoke
19:30	Wayne Biggins 31'; Wayne Biggins 80'; Mark Stein 76'			Stadium: Victoria Ground; Attendance: 4,551

== See also ==
- List of Cardiff City F.C. seasons

== Bibliography ==
- Hayes, Dean (2006). The Who's Who of Cardiff City. Breedon Books. ISBN 1-85983-462-0.
- Shepherd, Richard (2002). The Definitive Cardiff City F.C. Tony Brown. ISBN 1-899-46817-X.
- Crooks, John (1992). Cardiff City Football Club: Official History of the Bluebirds. Yore Publications. ISBN 0-9513321-8-X.
- Rollin, Jack, ed. (1992). Rothmans Football Yearbook 1992-93. Headline Book Publishing. ISBN 0-7472-7905-5.
- "Football Club History Database – Cardiff City". Archived from the original on 30 December 2008.
- Welsh Football Data Archive
