= 1990–91 Cardiff City F.C. season =

Welsh football club season

Cardiff City
1990–91 season
- Chairman: Tony Clemo
- Manager: Len Ashurst
- Football League Fourth Division: 13th
- FA Cup: 1st round
- League Cup: 2nd round
- Welsh Cup: 3rd round
- Leyland DAF Cup: Preliminary round
- Top goalscorer: League: Chris Pike (14); All: Chris Pike (16)
- Highest home attendance: 4,805 (v Northampton, 1 April 1991)
- Lowest home attendance: 1,692 (v Aldershot, 1 February 1991)
- Average home league attendance: 2,958

The 1990–91 season was Cardiff City F.C.'s 64th season in the Football League when they competed in the 24-team Division Four, then the fourth tier of English football, finishing thirteenth.

== Players ==
First team squad. Note: Flags indicate national team as defined under FIFA eligibility rules; some limited exceptions apply. Players may hold more than one non-FIFA nationality.

Pos.	Nation	Player
GK	ENG	Roger Hansbury
GK	ENG	Gavin Ward
DF	WAL	Gareth Abraham
DF	WAL	Lee Baddeley
DF	ENG	Ray Daniel
DF	WAL	Nathan Jones
DF	WAL	Allan Lewis
DF	NIR	Neil Matthews
DF	WAL	Jason Perry
DF	ENG	Ian Rodgerson
DF	WAL	Damon Searle
DF	ENG	Jamie Unsworth
MF	ENG	Leigh Barnard
MF	ENG	Jeff Chandler

Pos.	Nation	Player
MF	IRL	Ken DeMange
MF	WAL	Chris Fry
MF	GUY	Cohen Griffith
MF	ENG	Pat Heard
MF	ENG	Phil Heath
MF	ENG	Mark Jones
MF	SCO	Kevin MacDonald
MF	WAL	Jon Morgan
FW	WAL	Nathan Blake
FW	WAL	Chris Pike
FW	ENG	Kevin Russell
FW	WAL	Lee Stephens
FW	WAL	Chris Summers
FW	WAL	Cameron Toshack

== Standings ==
Pos	Team	Pld	W	D	L	GF	GA	GD	Pts
11	Doncaster Rovers	46	17	14	15	56	46	+10	65
12	Rochdale	46	15	17	14	50	53	−3	62
13	Cardiff City	46	15	15	16	43	54	−11	60
14	Lincoln City	46	14	17	15	50	61	−11	59
15	Gillingham	46	12	18	16	57	60	−3	54

=== Results by round ===
Round	1	2	3	4	5	6	7	8	9	10	11	12	13	14	15	16	17	18	19	20	21	22	23	24	25	26	27	28	29	30	31	32	33	34	35	36	37	38	39	40	41	42	43	44	45	46
Ground	H	A	H	A	A	H	A	H	H	A	A	H	H	A	H	A	A	H	A	H	H	A	H	H	H	H	A	A	A	H	A	A	H	H	A	A	H	A	A	H	A	H	A	H	A	H
Result	D	W	D	D	D	D	W	L	W	W	D	L	D	L	W	L	L	L	D	W	W	L	W	L	L	W	W	D	D	W	D	D	W	W	L	L	W	W	L	L	L	L	D	D	L	D
Position	~	6	6	9	9	11	8	10	8	5	6	9	9	9	9	11	13	16	17	14	12	13	11	14	16	16	14	15	14	11	12	12	12	10	10	11	11	11	12	12	12	12	13	13	13	13
Points	1	4	5	6	7	8	11	11	14	17	18	18	19	19	22	22	22	22	23	26	29	29	32	32	32	35	38	39	40	43	44	45	48	51	51	51	54	57	57	57	57	57	58	59	59	60

A = Away; H = Home; W = Win; D = Draw; L = Loss

== Fixtures and results ==
=== Fourth Division ===
25 August 1990 1	Cardiff City	0–0	Scarborough	Cardiff
15:00				Stadium: Ninian Park; Attendance: 3,819; Referee: David Frampton (Poole, Dorset)

1 September 1990 2	Hartlepool United	0–2	Cardiff City	Hartlepool
15:00			56' Cohen Griffith; 60' Chris Pike	Stadium: Victoria Park; Attendance: 2,800; Referee: WA Flood

8 September 1990 3	Cardiff City	3–3	Torquay United	Cardiff
15:00	Cohen Griffith 18'; Chris Pike 58', 71' (pen.)		35' Dean Edwards; 31' Matt Elliott; 80' (pen.) Tommy Tynan	Stadium: Ninian Park; Attendance: 3,656; Referee: Alf Buksh

15 September 1990 4	Lincoln City	0–0	Cardiff City	Lincoln
15:00				Stadium: Sincil Bank; Attendance: 3,152; Referee: EJ Parker

18 September 1990 5	Aldershot	0–0	Cardiff City	Aldershot
19:30				Stadium: Recreation Ground; Attendance: 2,310; Referee: ML James

22 September 1990 6	Cardiff City	3–3	Stockport County	Cardiff
15:00	Cohen Griffith 4'; Chris Pike 10'; Roger Gibbins 12'		52' Neil Matthews; 77' Chris Beaumont; 86' Paul Williams	Stadium: Ninian Park; Attendance: 3,608; Referee: GS Willard (Worthing)

29 September 1990 7	Scunthorpe United	0–2	Cardiff City	Scunthorpe
15:00			62', 89' (pen.) Chris Pike	Stadium: Glanford Park; Attendance: 2,573; Referee: LR Dilkes

2 October 1990 8	Cardiff City	0–1	Rochdale	Cardiff
19:30			50' Andy Milner	Stadium: Ninian Park; Attendance: 3,391; Referee: Les Hamer (Chorley)

5 October 1990 9	Cardiff City	1–0	Wrexham	Cardiff
19:30	Chris Pike 43'	Wrexham report		Stadium: Ninian Park; Attendance: 3,452; Referee: Martin Bodenham

13 October 1990 10	York City	1–2	Cardiff City	York
15:00	Ray Warburton		Nathan Blake; Nathan Blake	Stadium: Bootham Crescent; Attendance: 2,596

20 October 1990 11	Hereford United	1–1	Cardiff City	Hereford
	Paul Wheeler		Nathan Jones	Stadium: Edgar Street; Attendance: 5,782

23 October 1990 12	Cardiff City	0–2	Doncaster Rovers	Cardiff
19:30			(pen.) Eddie Gormley; Neil Grayson	Stadium: Ninian Park; Attendance: 3,891

27 October 1990 13	Cardiff City	1–1	Peterborough United	Cardiff
15:00	Chris Pike		Mark Hine	Stadium: Ninian Park; Attendance: 2,940; Referee: Jim Rushton (Stoke on Trent)

3 November 1990 14	Maidstone United	3–0	Cardiff City	Maidstone
15:00	Les Berry; Les Berry; Steve Butler			Stadium: Watling Street; Attendance: 2,010; Referee: K Morton (Bury-St-Edmunds)

10 November 1990 15	Cardiff City	2–1	Chesterfield	Cardiff
15:00	Roger Gibbins 16'; Chris Pike 64'		39' John Cooke	Stadium: Ninian Park; Attendance: 2,019; Referee: RL Bigger (Croydon)

24 November 1990 16	Gillingham	4–0	Cardiff City	Gillingham
15:00	Mark O'Connor 55'; David Crown 66'; Alan Walker 74'; Ian Docker 84'	Gillingham report		Stadium: Priestfield Stadium; Attendance: 3,793; Referee: John Martin (Alton, Hampshire)

1 December 1990 17	Burnley	2–0	Cardiff City	Burnley
19:30	John Deary 56'; John Francis 59'			Stadium: Turf Moor; Attendance: 6,353; Referee: Alan Dawson (Jarrow)

15 December 1990 18	Cardiff City	0–2	Walsall	Cardiff
15:00			Martin Goldsmith (pen.) Stuart Rimmer	Stadium: Ninian Park; Attendance: 2,017

21 December 1990 19	Northampton Town	0–0	Cardiff City	Northampton
19:30				Stadium: County Ground; Attendance: 3,303

26 December 1990 20	Cardiff City	3–1	Carlisle United	Cardiff
15:00	Chris Pike; Mark Taylor; Mark Taylor		Simon Jeffels	Stadium: Ninian Park; Attendance: 2,281

29 December 1990 21	Cardiff City	1–0	Halifax Town	Cardiff
15:00	Mark Taylor 77'			Stadium: Ninian Park; Attendance: 2,903; Referee: ME (Mick) Pierce (Portsmouth)

1 January 1991 22	Darlington	4–1	Cardiff City	Darlington
15:00	Les McJannet; David Cork; Jimmy Willis; Mick Tait		Cohen Griffith	Stadium: Feethams; Attendance: 3,151

12 January 1991 23	Cardiff City	1–0	Hartlepool United	Cardiff
15:00	Cohen Griffith 27'			Stadium: Ninian Park; Attendance: 2,619

26 January 1991 24	Cardiff City	0–1	Lincoln City	Cardiff
15:00			Keith Alexander	Stadium: Ninian Park; Attendance: 2,513

1 February 1991 25	Cardiff City	1–3	Aldershot	Cardiff
19:30	Roger Gibbins		Charlie Henry; David Puckett; Adrian Randall	Stadium: Ninian Park; Attendance: 1,692

15 February 1991 26	Cardiff City	2–0	Gillingham	Cardiff
19:30	Roger Gibbins 38'; Chris Pike 67' (pen.)	Gillingham report	(red card) 66' Harvey Lim	Stadium: Ninian Park; Attendance: 2,170; Referee: Arthur Smith (Birmingham)

19 February 1991 27	Scarborough	1–2	Cardiff City	Scarborough, North Yorkshire
19:30	Tommy Mooney		Cohen Griffith; Cohen Griffith	Stadium: Athletic Ground; Attendance: 1,192

23 February 1991 28	Chesterfield	0–0	Cardiff City	Chesterfield
15:00				Stadium: Saltergate; Attendance: 3,065

26 February 1991 29	Stockport County	1–1	Cardiff City	Stockport
19:30	Jim Gannon		Nathan Blake	Stadium: Edgeley Park; Attendance: 3,376

1 March 1991 30	Cardiff City	3–0	Burnley	Cardiff
19:30	Pat Heard 6'; Chris Pike 32' (pen.); Cohen Griffith 37'			Stadium: Ninian Park; Attendance: 3,591; Referee: Mike James

9 March 1991 31	Walsall	0–0	Cardiff City	Walsall
15:00				Stadium: Fellows Park; Attendance: 3,950

12 March 1991 32	Rochdale	0–0	Cardiff City	Rochdale
				Stadium: Spotland; Attendance: 1,569; Referee: Mike Peck (Kendal)

16 March 1991 33	Cardiff City	1–0	Scunthorpe United	Cardiff
15:00	Chris Pike (pen.)			Stadium: Ninian Park; Attendance: 2,873

19 March 1991 34	Cardiff City	2–1	York City	Cardiff
19:30	Pat Heard; Leigh Barnard		Tony Canham	Stadium: Ninian Park; Attendance: 2,620

22 March 1991 35	Wrexham	1–0	Cardiff City	Wrexham
19:30	Jon Bowden 7'	Wrexham report		Stadium: The Racecourse; Attendance: 1,787; Referee: Mike Reed (Birmingham)

30 March 1991 36	Carlisle United	3–2	Cardiff City	Carlisle
15:00	Tony Shepherd; Paul Proudlock; Paul Proudlock		Neil Matthews; Nathan Blake	Stadium: Brunton Park; Attendance: 2,264

1 April 1991 37	Cardiff City	1–0	Northampton Town	Cardiff
15:00	Greg Campbell (o.g.)			Stadium: Ninian Park; Attendance: 4,805

6 April 1991 38	Halifax Town	1–2	Cardiff City	Halifax
15:00	Ian Juryeff		Chris Pike; Pat Heard	Stadium: The Shay; Attendance: 1,364

10 April 1991 39	Torquay United	2–1	Cardiff City	Torquay
19:30	Wes Saunders; Sean Joyce		Roger Gibbins	Stadium: Plainmoor; Attendance: 3,341

13 April 1991 40	Cardiff City	0–1	Darlington	Cardiff
15:00			(o.g.) Neil Matthews	Stadium: Ninian Park; Attendance: 4,544

17 April 1991 41	Blackpool	3–0	Cardiff City	Blackpool
19:30	Paul Groves 16'; Phil Horner 18'; Tony Rodwell 58'			Stadium: Bloomfield Road; Attendance: 4,813; Referee: R Shepherd

20 April 1991 42	Cardiff City	0–2	Hereford United	Cardiff
15:00			28' Simon Brain; 39' (pen.) Jon Narbett	Stadium: Ninian Park; Attendance: 2,845; Referee: Bob Hamer (Bristol)

27 April 1991 43	Doncaster Rovers	1–1	Cardiff City	Doncaster
15:00	Kevin Noteman 24'		39' Phil Heath	Stadium: Belle Vue; Attendance: 2,227; Referee: Neil Midgley (Eccles)

2 May 1991 44	Cardiff City	1–1	Blackpool	Cardiff
19:30	Cohen Griffith 49'		42' (pen.) Andy Garner	Stadium: Ninian Park; Attendance: 1,793; Referee: Lester Shapter

4 May 1991 45	Peterborough United	3–0	Cardiff City	Peterborough
15:00	David Robinson 8'; Kevin Bremner 86'; Paul Culpin 89'			Stadium: London Road; Attendance: 6,642; Referee: CR Wilkes

11 May 1991 46	Cardiff City	0–0	Maidstone United	Cardiff
15:00				Stadium: Ninian Park; Attendance: 2,011; Referee: GR Pooley (Bishops Stortford)

=== League Cup ===
28 August 1990 Round 1 (First leg)	Mansfield Town	1–1	Cardiff City	Mansfield
19:30	Steve Charles 57'		23' Cohen Griffith	Stadium: Field Mill; Attendance: 1,091; Referee: JW Lloyd

4 September 1990 Round 1 (Second leg)	Cardiff City	3–0 (4–1 agg.)	Mansfield Town	Cardiff
19:30	Cohen Griffith 34', 85'; Chris Pike 82'			Stadium: Ninian Park; Attendance: 2,539; Referee: Paul Durkin (Dorset)

25 September 1990 Round 2 (First leg)	Cardiff City	1–1	Portsmouth	Cardiff
19:30	Cohen Griffith 55'		12' Warren Aspinall	Stadium: Ninian Park; Attendance: 4,224; Referee: Gerald Ashby (Worcester)

9 October 1990 Round 2 (Second leg)	Portsmouth	3–1 (a.e.t.) (4–2 agg.)	Cardiff City	Portsmouth
19:45	Colin Clarke 39', 99'; Warren Neill 119'		50' Cohen Griffith	Stadium: Fratton Park; Attendance: 6,174; Referee: Gerald Ashby (Worcester)

=== FA Cup ===
17 November 1990 Round 1	Cardiff City	0–0	Hayes	Cardiff
12:00				Stadium: Ninian Park; Attendance: 1,844

21 November 1990 Round 1 (Replay)	Hayes	1–0	Cardiff City	London
	Clarke			Stadium: Griffin Park; Attendance: 4,312

=== Welsh Cup ===
6 November 1990 Round 3	Cardiff City	1–4	Merthyr Tydfil	Cardiff
19:30	Chris Pike (pen.)		Goal	Stadium: Ninian Park; Attendance: 3,204

=== Leyland DAF Cup ===
13 November 1990 Preliminary Round	Cardiff City	0–1	Exeter City	Cardiff
19:30			Danny Bailey	Stadium: Ninian Park; Attendance: 1,024

11 December 1990 Preliminary Round	Hereford United	1–1	Cardiff City	Hereford
	Jon Narbett		Cohen Griffith	Stadium: Edgar Street; Attendance: 2,007

== See also ==
- List of Cardiff City F.C. seasons

== Bibliography ==
- Hayes, Dean (2006). The Who's Who of Cardiff City. Breedon Books. ISBN 1-85983-462-0.
- Crooks, John (1986). Cardiff City Chronology 1920-86. John Crooks. ISBN 0-9511984-0-8.
- Shepherd, Richard (2002). The Definitive Cardiff City F.C. Tony Brown. ISBN 1-899-46817-X.
- Crooks, John (1992). Cardiff City Football Club: Official History of the Bluebirds. Yore Publications. ISBN 0-9513321-8-X.
- Rollin, Jack, ed. (1991). Rothmans Football Yearbook 1991-92. Queen Anne Press. ISBN 0-356-19198-2.
- "Football Club History Database – Cardiff City". Archived from the original on 30 December 2008.
- Welsh Football Data Archive
