= 1987 Football League Third Division play-off final =

Gillingham	Swindon Town
2	2
- on aggregate Swindon Town won 2–0 after a replay

First leg
Gillingham	Swindon Town
1	0
- Date: 22 May 1987
- Venue: Priestfield Stadium, Gillingham
- Referee: Alf Buksh
- Attendance: 16,775

Second leg
Swindon Town	Gillingham
2	1
- Date: 25 May 1987
- Venue: County Ground, Swindon
- Referee: Lester Shapter
- Attendance: 14,382

Replay
Swindon Town	Gillingham
2	0
- Date: 29 May 1987
- Venue: Selhurst Park, Croydon
- Referee: John Martin
- Attendance: 18,491

The 1987 Football League Third Division play-off final was an association football match contested by Gillingham and Swindon Town over two legs on 22 and 25 May 1987, followed by a replay on 29 May, to determine which club would play the next season in the Second Division. Gillingham had finished in fifth place in the Third Division while Swindon finished third. They were joined in the play-offs by fourth-placed Wigan Athletic and Sunderland, who had finished 20th in the division above. Gillingham defeated Sunderland in their semi-final on away goals and Swindon defeated Wigan in the other semi-final. Swindon had previously had two spells in the Second Division, but Gillingham were aiming to reach the second tier of English football for the first time in their history. The 1986–87 season was the first in which the teams who had missed out on automatic promotion had the opportunity to compete in play-offs for a further promotion place.

The first leg of the final was played at Priestfield Stadium, in front of a crowd of 16,775. Dave Smith scored the only goal of the game to give Gillingham a one-goal lead heading into the second leg. Three days later at the County Ground, 14,382 people saw Karl Elsey score the opening goal of the match in the 17th minute, to double Gillingham's lead. This was followed by two goals from Peter Coyne and Charlie Henry to give Swindon a 2–1 victory in the match. Although Gillingham's semi-final had been decided on away goals, the same rule did not apply in the final, so a replay was held at Selhurst Park, where two goals from Steve White secured Swindon a place in the Second Division.

The following season, Swindon finished in 12th position in the Second Division and Gillingham finished 13th in the Third Division, only nine points ahead of the relegation zone.

== Background ==
Gillingham and Swindon Town were competing to be promoted from the Football League Third Division to the Second Division for the 1987–88 season. The 1986–87 season was the inaugural season of the Football League play-offs, which were introduced as part of the Heathrow Agreement, a ten-point proposal to restructure the Football League. For the first two years of the play-offs, the club which had finished immediately above the automatic relegation places in the Second Division competed with three clubs from the Third Division for a place in the Second Division for the following season. The play-offs raised an extra £1 million in revenue in their first year, half of which would be shared by all member clubs, and a spokesman for the Football League dubbed them "a phenomenal success". They were criticised by some in the game, however. Oldham Athletic manager Joe Royle was scathing of them after losing in the semi-final of the Second Division play-offs, saying "We finished seven points clear of Leeds. So to go out on away goals to them means there is something unjust. I welcomed the play-offs but possibly hadn't considered the long-term ramifications." The Swindon manager Lou Macari was also dissatisfied with the play-offs, arguing "we have proved ourselves the better team over 46 games this season but then see our future decided in Cup-style matches".

Swindon had played in the Second Division between 1963 and 1965 and between 1969 and 1974, but Gillingham were aiming to reach the second tier of English football for the first time in their history. After being relegated to the Fourth Division in 1982, Swindon had slumped to a lowest-ever finish of 17th in the Football League's lowest division in 1984, after which Macari was appointed as the club's new manager. Two years later he had led the team to the championship of the Fourth Division with a Football League record total of 102 points, and was aiming for a second consecutive promotion. Under manager Keith Peacock, Gillingham had come close to promotion from the Third Division in both the two previous seasons, having finished in fourth place in 1984–85 and fifth in 1985–86. The teams had met twice during the regular season; Swindon had won 3–1 at Gillingham's Priestfield Stadium in December, and the match at Swindon's County Ground in May had ended in a 1–1 draw. According to bookmakers, Swindon were clear favourites to secure promotion to the Second Division.

== Route to the final ==
Football League Second Division final table, bottom positions
Pos	Team	Pld	W	D	L	GF	GA	GD	Pts
20	Sunderland	42	12	12	18	49	59	−10	48
21	Grimsby Town	42	10	14	18	39	59	−20	44
22	Brighton & Hove Albion	42	9	12	21	37	54	−17	39

Football League Third Division final table, leading positions
Pos	Team	Pld	W	D	L	GF	GA	GD	Pts
1	Bournemouth	46	29	10	7	76	40	+36	97
2	Middlesbrough	46	28	10	8	67	30	+37	94
3	Swindon Town	46	25	12	9	77	47	+30	87
4	Wigan Athletic	46	25	10	11	83	60	+23	85
5	Gillingham	46	23	9	14	65	48	+17	78

Swindon finished in third place in the Third Division, seven points behind Middlesbrough and ten behind Bournemouth, both of whom were promoted automatically. At Christmas 1986, Gillingham had been in second place, but the team's form declined in the second half of the season, with 9 defeats in 20 games between January and April. As a result, Gillingham ended the regular season in fifth place, 9 points behind Swindon and 16 points outside the automatic promotion places.

Gillingham's opposition for their play-off semi-final were Sunderland, who finished the 1986–87 season in 20th place in the Second Division. The first match of the two-legged tie took place at Priestfield Stadium in Gillingham on 14 May 1987. Mark Proctor scored a penalty kick to give Sunderland a 1–0 lead at half-time, but in the second half Tony Cascarino scored a hat-trick to put Gillingham 3–1 up. Proctor scored a second goal late in the game to make the final score 3–2. The second leg was held at Roker Park in Sunderland three days later. After just four minutes, Howard Pritchard scored for Gillingham, but two goals from Eric Gates put Sunderland in front. In the second half, a goal from Cascarino made the scoreline 2–2 on the day and 5–4 on aggregate, but with less than a minute remaining, Gary Bennett of Sunderland brought the aggregate scores level to send the game into extra time. Both teams scored one more goal in the extra period, making the score 6–6 on aggregate, but as Gillingham had now scored more away goals, they progressed to the final. Sunderland were thus relegated to the third tier of English football for the first time in the club's history.

In the other semi-final, Swindon faced Wigan Athletic, and the first leg was held at Springfield Park in Wigan on 14 May 1987. The home side took an early lead after two minutes when Chris Thompson scored from around 20 yards (18 m). Wigan doubled their lead after 15 minutes when Swindon's goalkeeper Fraser Digby dropped a free kick, allowing Bobby Campbell to put the loose ball into the Swindon goal. In the second half, Digby saved from Paul Jewell and Swindon started to dominate. Wigan's goalkeeper Roy Tunks dived at the feet of Jimmy Quinn to deny a goalscoring chance, but the ball fell to Dave Bamber, who scored. In the 80th minute, Quinn equalised with a firm header from a Steve Berry free kick. With two minutes remaining, Swindon's Mark Jones crossed from the right and Peter Coyne scored with a header, making the final score 3–2. The return leg took place at the County Ground three days later. As the match ended in a 0–0 draw, Swindon progressed to the final with a 3–2 aggregate score.

== Match ==
Alf Buksh was selected as the referee for the first leg and Lester Shapter for the second. The latter referee had caused controversy when he disallowed a goal in a match involving Swindon earlier in the season; Macari had been reported to the Football Association, the governing body of the sport in England, for his comments about Shapter after the match. Tickets for both legs went on sale before the first, and such was the demand that fans camped outside Priestfield Stadium overnight to secure them. David Powell of The Times highlighted the clash between Gillingham's Colin Greenall and Swindon's Bamber, close friends off the pitch, as a potential key element of the final. Clive King of the Swindon Evening Advertiser said that his local team's main concern would be preventing Cascarino from scoring.

=== First leg ===
==== Summary ====
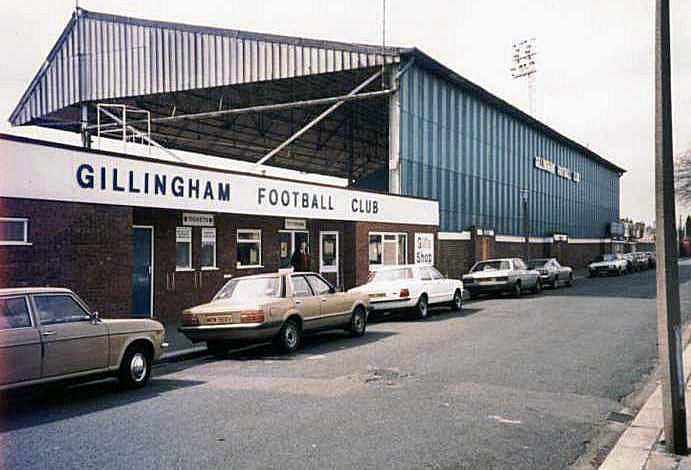
The first leg of the final took place at Priestfield Stadium.

The first leg of the final drew a crowd of 16,775 and gate receipts of £49,377, a new record for Priestfield Stadium. Chris Kamara was an injury doubt for Swindon, and Gillingham's Steve Lovell, Joe Hinnigan, Mark Weatherly and Irvin Gernon were all out. Gillingham manager Peacock told the press "Everyone here is very excited to be so close, but Lou Macari has done a terrific job at Swindon, and you can be sure any team he fields will run for 90 minutes. We will have our hands full." Before the match, trouble flared between rival groups of fans and two British Transport Police officers were injured by thrown projectiles.

Having scored five goals in the semi-final, Gillingham centre-forward Cascarino found himself closely marked by Swindon's Tim Parkin and Colin Calderwood. Phil Kite made two saves from Kamara before Quinn headed over the bar and Bamber's goal was disallowed for offside. Quinn was later substituted after receiving a strong tackle from Gillingham defender Les Berry. According to Powell of The Times, Swindon were "superior in all departments except the telling ones – finishing and goalkeeping", and Kite made two further saves, both from Steve Berry. The game remained goalless until the 81st minute when Gillingham took the lead. Dave Smith received the ball on the edge of the Swindon penalty area following Trevor Quow's free kick and hit a fierce shot past Swindon goalkeeper Digby, to give his team a one-goal lead going into the second leg.

==== Details ====
22 May 1987	Gillingham	1–0	Swindon Town	Priestfield Stadium, Gillingham
19:45	Smith 81'			Attendance: 16,775; Referee: Alf Buksh

Gillingham	Swindon Town

1	Phil Kite
2	Paul Haylock
3	Graham Pearce
4	Les Berry
5	Trevor Quow
6	Colin Greenall
7	Howard Pritchard
8	Dave Shearer
9	Dave Smith
10	Karl Elsey
11	Tony Cascarino
Manager:
Keith Peacock

1	Fraser Digby
2	Dave Hockaday
3	Phil King
4	Leigh Barnard
5	Tim Parkin
6	Colin Calderwood
7	Mark Jones
8	Chris Kamara
9	Jimmy Quinn (substituted off)
10	Dave Bamber
11	Steve Berry
Substitute used:
12	Charlie Henry (substituted on)
Manager:
Lou Macari

=== Second leg ===
==== Summary ====
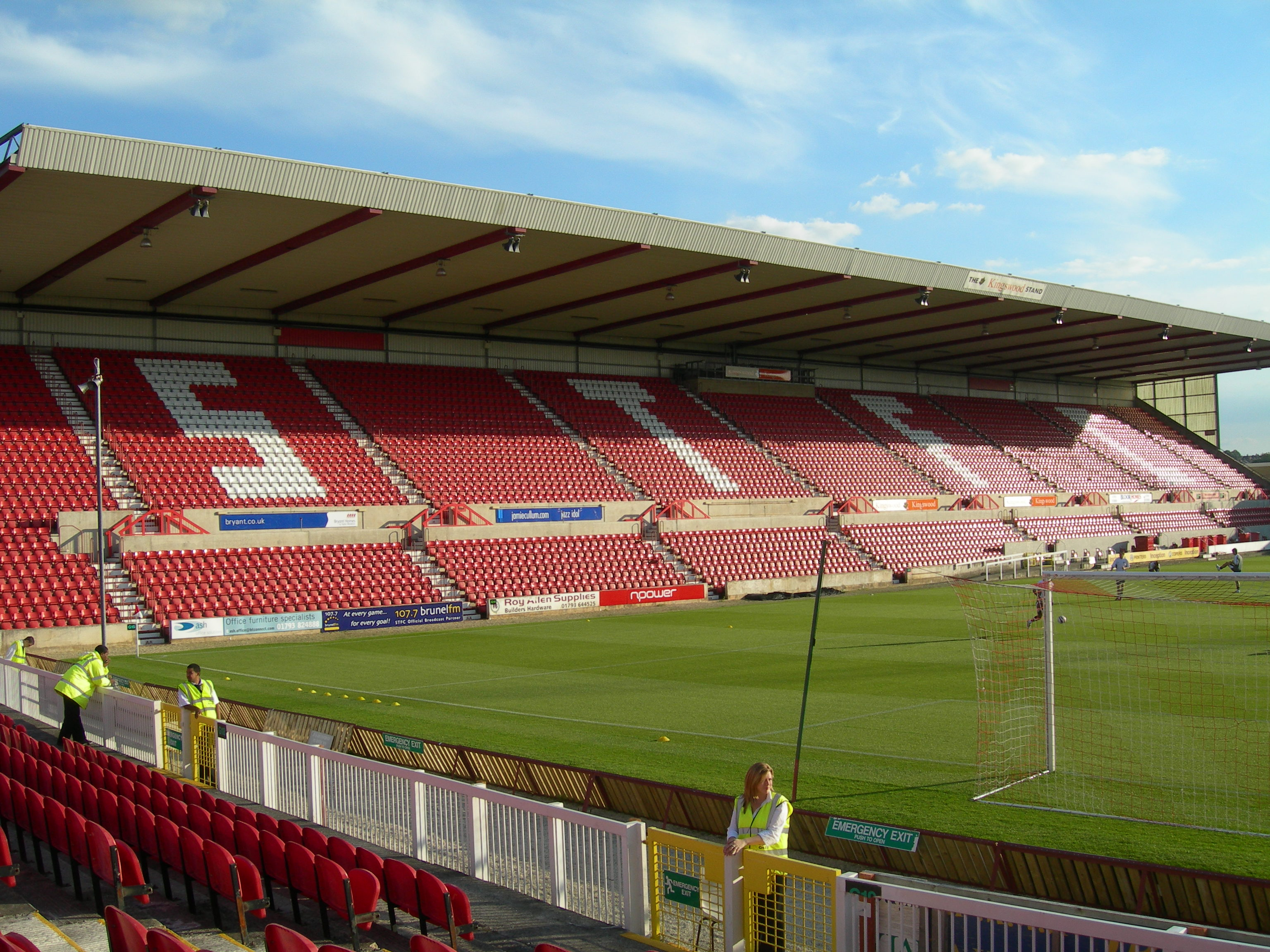
The second leg took place at the County Ground in Swindon.

Both teams made one change for the second leg, which took place three days later. Gillingham manager Peacock picked Steve Lovell in place of goalscorer Smith, who was named as a substitute. Swindon's Macari brought in Coyne in place of Quinn.

Gillingham took the lead in the 17th minute against the run of play. Paul Haylock played a cross towards the edge of the Swindon penalty area which Karl Elsey struck on the volley into the net past a static Digby. Swindon's Kamara sustained an injury during the first half and was replaced by Charlie Henry. Bamber, Parkin and Henry all had headers saved by Kite in the Gillingham goal, who was described in The Guardian as "unbeatable ... for a good hour". Further goalbound efforts from both White and Henry struck the Gillingham crossbar before Swindon equalised just after the hour mark. Henry controlled a pass from Berry with his chest and passed to Coyne, who took the ball past two Gillingham players before hitting a fierce shot into the goal from around 15 yards (14 m). Gillingham attacked again after Smith came on in place of Elsey, but Swindon's defenders closed down their opponents. In the 79th minute, Swindon's Dave Hockaday crossed for Henry to score with a left-footed drive from the edge of the Gillingham penalty area, making the final score on the day 2–1 to Swindon and the aggregate score across the two legs 2–2.

If the rules governing the play-off final had been the same as the semi-final, Gillingham would have won on away goals; the rules for the final, however, stated that if the aggregate scores were level at the end of the second leg, away goals would not be taken into consideration but instead a replay would take place at a neutral stadium. Robert Armstrong, writing in The Guardian, described the second leg as "an epic battle, in the best Anglo-Saxon tradition of the knockout competition". After the match, Peacock said "It was disappointing to give away two goals after getting ourselves into a commanding position....we must now pick ourselves up and prepare for the game on Friday." Macari said "I knew that if we could keep them under the kind of pressure we were putting them under they would have to crack."

==== Details ====
25 May 1987	Swindon Town	2–1 (2–2 agg.)	Gillingham	County Ground, Swindon
19:45	Coyne 61'; Henry 80'		Elsey 17'	Attendance: 14,382; Referee: Lester Shapter

Swindon Town	Gillingham

1	Fraser Digby
2	Dave Hockaday
3	Phil King
4	Peter Coyne
5	Tim Parkin
6	Colin Calderwood
7	Dave Bamber
8	Chris Kamara (substituted off)
9	Steve Berry
10	Steve White
11	Leigh Barnard
Substitute used:
12	Charlie Henry (substituted on)
Manager:
Lou Macari

1	Phil Kite
2	Paul Haylock
3	Graham Pearce
4	Les Berry
5	Trevor Quow
6	Colin Greenall
7	Howard Pritchard
8	Dave Shearer
9	Steve Lovell
10	Karl Elsey (substituted off)
11	Tony Cascarino
Substitute used:
12	Dave Smith (substituted on)
Manager:
Keith Peacock

=== Replay ===
==== Summary ====
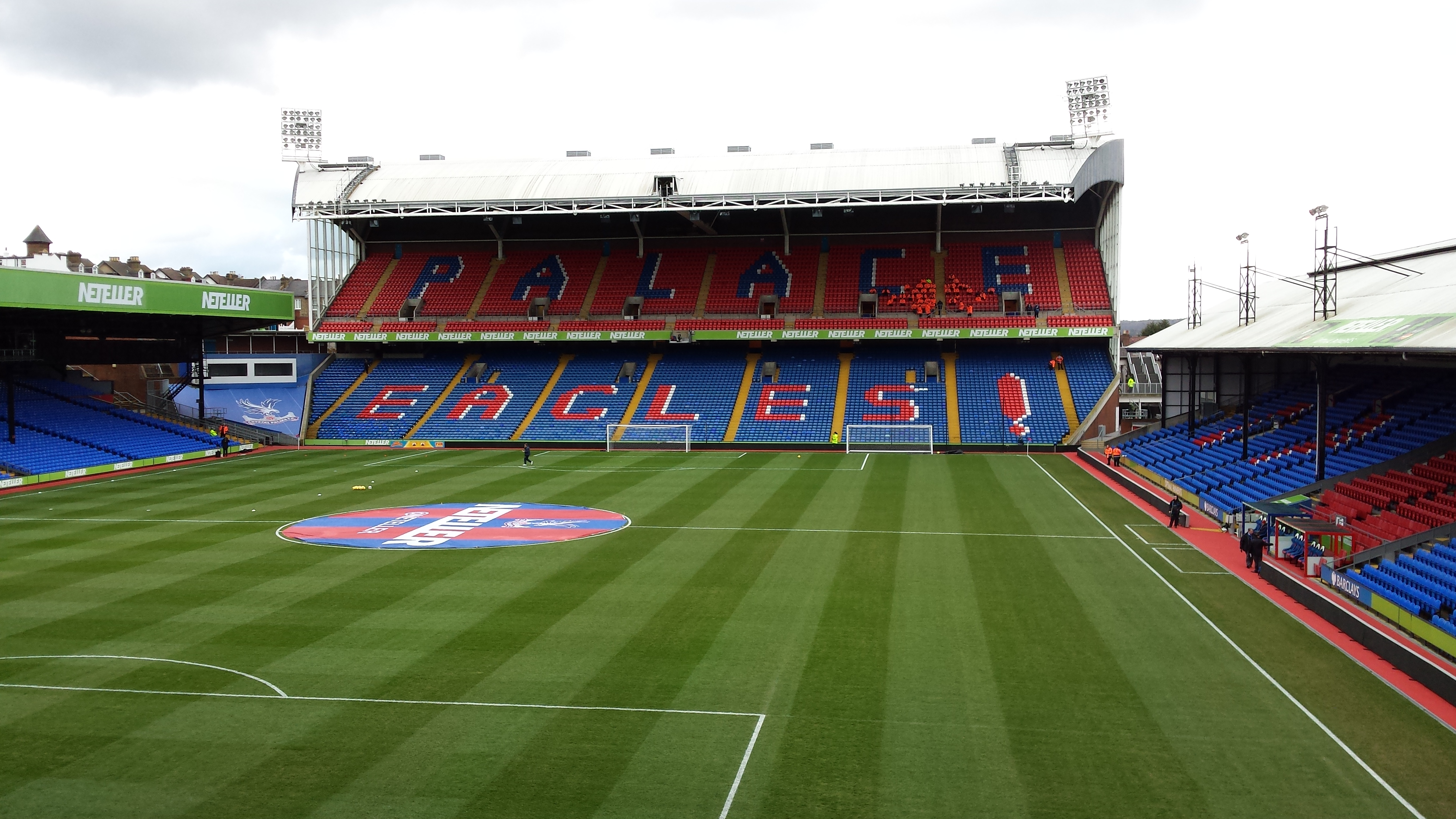
The replay took place at Selhurst Park.

The replay took place at Selhurst Park, home of Crystal Palace, four days after the second leg; the game was scheduled for the slightly later than usual time of 8.00 pm to allow the two sets of fans time to travel to the ground. As a result of their participation in the FA Cup and Football League Cup, and a run to the southern section semi-finals of the Associate Members' Cup, all alongside the Football League programme, it was Gillingham's 63rd match of the season, a new record for the most games the team had played in a season since joining the Football League. Both teams again made one change for the replay. Swindon's Henry, who had come on as a substitute in both previous games, was named in the starting line-up in place of Kamara, who was hospitalised after his injury in the previous match. Gillingham brought in Martin Robinson in place of Lovell. Swindon remained the bookmakers' favourites to win promotion.

Swindon took the lead after just two minutes, when an error by the Gillingham defence allowed Steve White to score. A long pass from a King free kick was headed on by Henry to White who outran Berry to score past Kite in the Gillingham goal. Neither side dominated the first half; just before half-time, Elsey played a one-two with Quow, but his shot went outside the far post. The second half saw Gillingham begin to dominate possession and Digby saved a Cascarino header at full stretch. A shot from Shearer then passed over the bar with Digby motionless in the goal.

Midway through the second half Swindon's Bamber began an attack and Leigh Barnard played the ball to White, who scored again to double his team's lead. Gillingham increased the pressure, Digby denying Pritchard and then saving from Quow before punching away a header from Cascarino. With seven minutes remaining Gillingham's Smith set up a goal-scoring opportunity for Dave Shearer but his close-range shot went wide of the goal.

==== Details ====
29 May 1987	Swindon Town	2–0	Gillingham	Selhurst Park, Croydon
20:00	White 2', 65'			Attendance: 18,491; Referee: John Martin

Swindon Town	Gillingham

1	Fraser Digby
2	Dave Hockaday
3	Phil King
4	Peter Coyne
5	Tim Parkin
6	Colin Calderwood
7	Dave Bamber
8	Steve Berry
9	Charlie Henry
10	Steve White
11	Leigh Barnard
Manager:
Lou Macari

1	Phil Kite
2	Paul Haylock
3	Graham Pearce
4	Les Berry
5	Trevor Quow
6	Colin Greenall
7	Howard Pritchard
8	Dave Shearer
9	Martin Robinson (substituted off)
10	Karl Elsey
11	Tony Cascarino
Substitute used:
12	Dave Smith (substituted on)
Manager:
Keith Peacock

== Post-match ==
Despite his team's victory, Swindon manager Macari was sympathetic to his opposition because of the manner in which they missed out on promotion: "Nothing can compensate for the feeling of disappointment in the Gillingham dressing room at this moment." He was critical of the play-off system, saying "This is one of the greatest moments of my career, but I never want to go through a game like this again. The League should scrap the play-offs." After he led the team to a second consecutive promotion, reporters asked Macari if he would be joining a more high-profile club, but he was focused on the play-off victory: "This is the greatest feeling of triumph in my career, even better than playing at the FA Cup Final at Wembley." Gillingham manager Peacock called the play-offs "good for the game", but noted that he felt "as low as I have ever felt in football". Roy Wood, chairman of Gillingham's board of directors, said "we are bloody disappointed, but we are not going to sit down and cry".

The following season, Swindon began the season strongly in the Second Division and in October were in 4th place, challenging for a third consecutive promotion. Their performances declined in the second half of the season, and they finished in 12th position. Gillingham began the season mounting another challenge for promotion from the Third Division, including defeating Southend United 8–1 and Chesterfield 10–0 on consecutive Saturdays, but the team's form slumped and manager Peacock was sacked in December 1987. Gillingham finished the 1987–88 season in 13th place in the Third Division, only nine points above the relegation zone. They finally reached the second tier of English football in 2000.
