= 1989–90 Cardiff City F.C. season =

Welsh football club season

Cardiff City
1989–90 season
- Chairman: Tony Clemo
- Manager: Frank Burrows/Len Ashurst
- Football League Third Division: 21st
- FA Cup: 3rd round
- League Cup: 1st round
- Welsh Cup: Semi-finals
- Leyland DAF Cup: Preliminary round
- Top goalscorer: League: Chris Pike (18); All: Chris Pike (23)
- Highest home attendance: 8,350 (v Swansea, 16 April 1990)
- Lowest home attendance: 2,086 (v Crewe, 17 February 1990)
- Average home league attendance: 3,630

The 1989–90 season was Cardiff City F.C.'s 63rd season in the Football League. They competed in the 24-team Division Three, then the third tier of English football, finishing twenty-first, suffering relegation to Division Four.

Manager Frank Burrows left the club in the first month of the year to become assistant manager at Portsmouth and was replaced by Len Ashurst, who started his second spell in charge of the club.

== Players ==
First team squad. Note: Flags indicate national team as defined under FIFA eligibility rules; some limited exceptions apply. Players may hold more than one non-FIFA nationality.

Pos.	Nation	Player
GK	ENG	Roger Hansbury
GK	ENG	Gavin Ward
GK	SCO	George Wood
DF	WAL	Gareth Abraham
DF	WAL	Phil Bater
DF	ENG	Ray Daniel
DF	WAL	Allan Lewis
DF	GER	Mario Miethig
DF	WAL	Jason Perry
DF	ENG	Cliff Powell
DF	ENG	Ian Rodgerson
DF	WAL	Damon Searle
DF	ENG	Eddie Youds
MF	ENG	Leigh Barnard
MF	ENG	Jeff Chandler
MF	WAL	Chris Fry
MF	GUY	Cohen Griffith

Pos.	Nation	Player
MF	WAL	Jason Gummer
MF	ENG	Mark Kelly
MF	SCO	David Kevan
MF	ENG	Steve Lynex
MF	WAL	Jon Morgan
MF	ENG	Chris Thompson
MF	ENG	Steve Tupling
MF	ENG	Paul Wheeler
FW	WAL	Nathan Blake
FW	WAL	Alan Curtis
FW	ENG	Jimmy Gilligan
FW	WAL	Richard Haig
FW	WAL	Ian Love
FW	WAL	Morrys Scott
FW	ENG	Richard Sendall

== Table ==
Pos	Team	Pld	W	D	L	GF	GA	GD	Pts	Promotion or relegation
19	Preston North End	46	14	10	22	65	79	−14	52	
20	Fulham	46	12	15	19	55	66	−11	51	
21	Cardiff City (R)	46	12	14	20	51	70	−19	50	Relegation to the Fourth Division
22	Northampton Town (R)	46	11	14	21	51	68	−17	47	Relegation to the Fourth Division
23	Blackpool (R)	46	10	16	20	49	73	−24	46	Relegation to the Fourth Division

(R) Relegated

=== Results by round ===
Round	1	2	3	4	5	6	7	8	9	10	11	12	13	14	15	16	17	18	19	20	21	22	23	24	25	26	27	28	29	30	31	32	33	34	35	36	37	38	39	40	41	42	43	44	45	46
Ground	H	A	H	A	H	A	H	A	A	H	H	A	H	A	H	A	H	A	H	A	A	H	A	H	A	H	A	A	H	H	A	A	H	A	A	H	H	A	H	A	H	A	H	H	H	A
Result	L	L	D	L	L	D	L	L	W	D	D	L	D	D	W	W	W	D	L	W	W	D	L	D	L	D	W	L	L	W	D	D	L	L	L	W	D	L	L	W	L	L	W	D	W	L
Position	~	24	23	24	24	24	24	24	23	23	23	24	24	24	23	23	17	19	21	17	16	21	21	21	22	22	21	22	22	20	20	19	21	21	23	21	21	22	22	21	22	22	21	21	21	21
Points	0	0	1	1	1	2	2	2	5	6	7	7	8	9	12	15	18	19	19	22	25	26	26	27	27	28	31	31	31	34	35	36	36	36	36	39	40	40	40	43	43	43	46	47	50	50

A = Away; H = Home; W = Win; D = Draw; L = Loss

== Fixtures and results ==
=== Third Division ===
19 August 1989 1	Cardiff City	0–2	Bolton Wanderers	Cardiff
15:00			6' Tony Philliskirk; 35' Julian Darby	Stadium: Ninian Park; Attendance: 4,367; Referee: Keith Cooper (Swindon)

26 August 1989 2	Tranmere Rovers	3–0	Cardiff City	Birkenhead
12:30	Jimmy Harvey; Mark McCarrick; John Morrissey			Stadium: Prenton Park; Attendance: 5,628

2 September 1989 3	Cardiff City	2–2	Brentford	Cardiff
15:00	Jimmy Gilligan; Chris Fry		Eddie May; Eddie May	Stadium: Ninian Park; Attendance: 3,499

9 September 1989 4	Mansfield Town	1–0	Cardiff City	Mansfield
15:00	Steve Charles			Stadium: Field Mill; Attendance: 2,766

16 September 1989 5	Cardiff City	0–3	Bristol City	Cardiff
15:00		Bristol Evening Post	45' Gary Shelton; 54' Bob Taylor; 62' Robbie Turner	Stadium: Ninian Park; Attendance: 5,970; Referee: Kevin Breen (Liverpool)

23 September 1989 6	Wigan Athletic	1–1	Cardiff City	Wigan
15:00	Andy Pilling		Steve Lynex	Stadium: Springfield Park (Wigan); Attendance: 2,345

26 September 1989 7	Cardiff City	2–3	Northampton Town	Cardiff
19:45	Chris Pike; Steve Lynex		Trevor Quow; Tony Adcock (o.g.) Gareth Abraham	Stadium: Ninian Park; Attendance: 2,801

30 September 1989 8	Rotherham United	4–0	Cardiff City	Rotherham
15:00	Bobby Williamson; Bobby Williamson; Bobby Williamson (pen.); Clive Mendonca			Stadium: Millmoor; Attendance: 4,998

7 October 1989 9	Huddersfield Town	2–3	Cardiff City	Huddersfield
	Chris Marsden; Kieran O'Regan		19' Cohen Griffith; Chris Pike (pen.) Chris Pike	Stadium: Leeds Road; Attendance: 5,835

13 October 1989 10	Cardiff City	1–1	Chester City	Cardiff
19:30	Leigh Barnard		Aidan Newhouse	Stadium: Ninian Park; Attendance: 3,675

17 October 1989 11	Cardiff City	1–1	Bristol Rovers	Cardiff
19:30	Mark Kelly 80'		71' David Mehew	Stadium: Ninian Park; Attendance: 6,372; Referee: John Moules (Erith, Kent)

21 October 1989 12	Blackpool	1–0	Cardiff City	Blackpool
15:00	Gordon Owen			Stadium: Bloomfield Road; Attendance: 3,502

28 October 1989 13	Cardiff City	1–1	Leyton Orient	Cardiff
15:00	Cohen Griffith		Lee Harvey	Stadium: Ninian Park; Attendance: 2,370

31 October 1989 14	Birmingham City	1–1	Cardiff City	Birmingham
19:45	Simon Sturridge		Jon Morgan	Stadium: St Andrew's; Attendance: 7,468

3 November 1989 15	Cardiff City	3–1	Bury	Cardiff
19:30	Chris Pike; Chris Pike; Leigh Barnard		Liam Robinson	Stadium: Ninian Park; Attendance: 3,437

11 November 1989 16	Fulham	2–5	Cardiff City	London
15:00	Steve Milton 11'; Justin Skinner 63' (pen.)		8', 72' Chris Pike; Cohen Griffith; 15' (o.g.) John Marshall; 81' Jon Morgan	Stadium: Craven Cottage; Attendance: 4,030; Referee: Arthur Smith

25 November 1989 17	Cardiff City	3–0	Preston North End	Cardiff
15:00	Ian Rodgerson 11'; Chris Pike 32'; Cohen Griffith 47'			Stadium: Ninian Park; Attendance: 3,270; Referee: John Carter (Christchurch, Dorset)

2 December 1989 18	Crewe Alexandra	1–1	Cardiff City	Crewe
15:00	Paul Fishenden		Jon Morgan	Stadium: Gresty Road; Attendance: 3,373; Referee: T Lunt

16 December 1989 19	Cardiff City	1–3	Notts County	Cardiff
15:00	Chris Pike 14'		2', 75' Phil Stant; 66' Phil Turner	Stadium: Ninian Park; Attendance: 3,610; Referee: ME Pearce

26 December 1989 20	Swansea City	0–1	Cardiff City	Swansea
11:00			(45s) Leigh Barnard	Stadium: Vetch Field; Attendance: 12,244; Referee: Ron Groves (Weston-Super-Mare)

30 December 1989 21	Walsall	0–2	Cardiff City	Walsall
15:00			66' Cohen Griffith; 69' Chris Pike	Stadium: Fellows Park; Attendance: 4,256; Referee: WA Flood

13 January 1990 22	Cardiff City	0–0	Tranmere Rovers	Cardiff
15:00				Stadium: Ninian Park; Attendance: 4,300; Referee: David Elleray (Harrow)

20 January 1990 23	Bolton Wanderers	3–1	Cardiff City	Bolton
15:00	Tony Philliskirk 23' (pen.), 38'; Paul Comstive 76'		68' Cohen Griffith	Stadium: Burnden Park; Attendance: 7,017; Referee: Gary Aplin (Kendal)

3 February 1990 24	Cardiff City	1–1	Wigan Athletic	Cardiff
15:00	Ian Rodgerson 47'		44' Andy Pilling	Stadium: Ninian Park; Attendance: 3,218; Referee: Martin Bodenham (East Looe, Cornwall)

10 February 1990 25	Bristol City	1–0	Cardiff City	Bristol
15:00	Gary Shelton 3'			Stadium: Ashton Gate; Attendance: 11,982; Referee: Tony Ward (London)

17 February 1990 26	Cardiff City	0–0	Crewe Alexandra	Cardiff
15:00				Stadium: Ninian Park; Attendance: 2,086; Referee: Paul Durkin (Dorset)

21 February 1990 27	Brentford	0–1	Cardiff City	Brentford
19:45			18' Gareth Abraham	Stadium: Griffin Park; Attendance: 5,174; Referee: Paul Vanes

24 February 1990 28	Preston North End	4–0	Cardiff City	Preston
15:00	Steve Harper 21', 47', 48'; Warren Joyce 57'			Stadium: Deepdale; Attendance: 5,718; Referee: PL Wright

2 March 1990 29	Cardiff City	0–1	Shrewsbury Town	Cardiff
19:30			72' (o.g.) Jason Perry	Stadium: Ninian Park; Attendance: 2,751; Referee: Gerald Ashby (Worcester)

6 March 1990 30	Cardiff City	2–0	Rotherham United	Cardiff
19:30	Chris Pike 19'; Leigh Barnard 77'			Stadium: Ninian Park; Attendance: 2,570; Referee: Keren Barratt (Coventry)

10 March 1990 31	Northampton Town	1–1	Cardiff City	Northampton
15:00	Bobby Barnes 88' (pen.)		14' Chris Pike	Stadium: County Ground; Attendance: 2,574; Referee: Peter Tyldesley

13 March 1990 32	Shrewsbury Town	0–0	Cardiff City	Shrewsbury
19:30				Stadium: Gay Meadow; Attendance: 2,318; Referee: Vic Callow (Solihull)

17 March 1990 33	Cardiff City	1–5	Huddersfield Town	Cardiff
15:00	Chris Pike 86'		4', 47', 62', 78' Craig Maskell; 75' Kieran O'Regan	Stadium: Ninian Park; Attendance: 2,568; Referee: JW Lloyd

20 March 1990 34	Chester City	1–0	Cardiff City	Chester
19:45	Carl Dale			Stadium: Sealand Road; Attendance: 1,866

24 March 1990 35	Bristol Rovers	2–1	Cardiff City	Bath, Somerset
12:00	Paul Nixon; David Mehew		Ian Rodgerson	Stadium: Twerton Park; Attendance: 4,631

27 March 1990 36	Cardiff City	1–0	Mansfield Town	Cardiff
19:30	Leigh Barnard			Stadium: Ninian Park; Attendance: 2,280

31 March 1990 37	Cardiff City	2–2	Blackpool	Cardiff
15:00	Roger Gibbins; Chris Pike		David Eyres; Gary Brook	Stadium: Ninian Park; Attendance: 2,850; Referee: Philip Don (Middlesex)

7 April 1990 38	Leyton Orient	3–1	Cardiff City	London
15:00	Kevin Hales (pen.); Paul Beesley; Lee Harvey		Chris Pike	Stadium: Brisbane Road; Attendance: 3,411

10 April 1990 39	Cardiff City	0–1	Birmingham City	Cardiff
19:30			Robert Hopkins	Stadium: Ninian Park; Attendance: 3,322

14 April 1990 40	Reading	0–1	Cardiff City	Reading
15:00			Cohen Griffith	Stadium: Elm Park; Attendance: 3,198

16 April 1990 41	Cardiff City	0–2	Swansea City	Cardiff
12:00			5' John Hughes; 85' Bryan Wade	Stadium: Ninian Park; Attendance: 8,350; Referee: Danny Vickers (Essex)

21 April 1990 42	Notts County	2–1	Cardiff City	Nottingham
15:00	Craig Short; Kevin Bartlett		(pen.) Chris Pike	Stadium: Meadow Lane; Attendance: 5,533

24 April 1990 43	Cardiff City	3–1	Walsall	Cardiff
19:30	Leigh Barnard 17'; Chris Pike 70'; Cohen Griffith 88'		41' Gary Shaw	Stadium: Ninian Park; Attendance: 2,509; Referee: John Carter (Christchurch, Dorset)

28 April 1990 44	Cardiff City	3–3	Fulham	Cardiff
15:00	Ray Daniel 24'; Leigh Barnard 57'; Ian Rodgerson 86'		36', 59' Steve Milton; 61' Gordon Davies	Stadium: Ninian Park; Attendance: 3,932; Referee: Alan Seville (Birmingham)

1 May 1990 45	Cardiff City	3–2	Reading	Cardiff
19:30	Leigh Barnard 2'; Chris Pike 28' (pen.); Cohen Griffith 35'		22' Steve Moran; 62' Trevor Senior	Stadium: Ninian Park; Attendance: 3,375; Referee: Terry Holbrook (Walsall)

5 May 1990 46	Bury	2–0	Cardiff City	Bury
15:00	Jamie Hoyland 35'; Philip Parkinson 47'			Stadium: Gigg Lane; Attendance: 4,224; Referee: SJ Lodge

=== League Cup ===
22 August 1989 Round 1 (First leg)	Cardiff City	0–3	Plymouth Argyle	Cardiff
19:45			58' Tommy Tynan; 69' (pen.) Tommy Tynan; 62' Sean McCarthy	Stadium: Ninian Park; Attendance: 2,620; Referee: Paul Vanes

29 August 1989 Round 1 (Second leg)	Plymouth Argyle	0–2 (3–2 agg.)	Cardiff City	Plymouth
			29' Chris Pike; Jon Morgan	Stadium: Home Park; Attendance: 5,728; Referee: Paul Durkin

=== FA Cup ===
18 November 1989 Round 1	Cardiff City	1–0	Halesowen Town	Cardiff
15:00	Chris Pike 21' (pen.)			Stadium: Ninian Park; Attendance: 3,972; Referee: Gerald Ashby (Worcester)

9 December 1989 Round 2	Cardiff City	2–2	Gloucester	Cardiff
15:00	Morrys Scott 85'; Morrys Scott 88'		Steve Talboys; Chris Townsend	Stadium: Ninian Park; Attendance: 4,531; Referee: AN Buksh

12 December 1989 Round 2 (Replay)	Gloucester	0–1	Cardiff City	Gloucester
			45' Morrys Scott	Stadium: Meadow Park, Gloucester; Attendance: 3,877; Referee: AN Buksh

6 January 1990 Round 3	Cardiff City	0–0	Queens Park Rangers	Cardiff
15:00				Stadium: Ninian Park; Attendance: 13,834; Referee: Paul Durkin

10 January 1990 Round 3 (Replay)	Queens Park Rangers	2–0	Cardiff City	London
19:45	Ray Wilkins 78'; Roy Wegerle 80'			Stadium: Loftus Road; Attendance: 12,226; Referee: Paul Durkin

=== Welsh Cup ===
25 October 1989 Round 3	Cardiff City	1–0	Newport AFC	Cardiff
19:30	Gareth Abraham			Stadium: Ninian Park; Attendance: 2,929

16 January 1990 Round 4	Cardiff City	4–1	Port Talbot	Cardiff
19:30	Ian Rodgerson; Chris Pike; Chris Pike; Leigh Barnard		Goal	Stadium: Ninian Park; Attendance: 1,128

6 February 1990 Round 5	Cardiff City	2–0	Aberystwyth Town	Cardiff
19:30	Ian Rodgerson; Mark Kelly			Stadium: Ninian Park; Attendance: 1,319

2 April 1990 Semi Final (1st leg)	Cardiff City	0–3	Hereford United	Cardiff
19:30			Goal	Stadium: Ninian Park; Attendance: 2,393; Referee: Keith Burge (Tonypandy)

4 April 1990 Semi Final (2nd leg)	Hereford United	1–3	Cardiff City	Hereford
	Goal		Chris Pike; Gareth Abraham; Cohen Griffith	Stadium: Edgar Street; Attendance: 2,955

=== Leyland DAF Cup ===
7 November 1989 Preliminary round	Cardiff City	3–5	Walsall	Cardiff
19:30	Cohen Griffith; Leigh Barnard; Gareth Abraham		Peter Skipper; Keith Bertschin; Keith Bertschin; Stuart Rimmer; John Kelly	Stadium: Ninian Park; Attendance: 1,487

19 December 1989 Preliminary round	Shrewsbury Town	4–0	Cardiff City	Shrewsbury
19:30	John McGinlay; John McGinlay; Willie Naughton (pen.); Philip Priest			Stadium: Gay Meadow; Attendance: 1,058

== See also ==
- List of Cardiff City F.C. seasons

== Bibliography ==
- Hayes, Dean (2006). The Who's Who of Cardiff City. Breedon Books. ISBN 1-85983-462-0.
- Crooks, John (1986). Cardiff City Chronology 1920-86. John Crooks. ISBN 0-9511984-0-8.
- Shepherd, Richard (2002). The Definitive Cardiff City F.C. Tony Brown. ISBN 1-899-46817-X.
- Crooks, John (1992). Cardiff City Football Club: Official History of the Bluebirds. Yore Publications. ISBN 0-9513321-8-X.
- Rollin, Jack, ed. (1990). Rothmans Football Yearbook 1990-91. Queen Anne Press. ISBN 0-356-17911-7.
- "Football Club History Database – Cardiff City". Archived from the original on 30 December 2008.
- Welsh Football Data Archive
