= Jon Morgan (footballer) =

Welsh footballer

Jonathan Morgan
Personal information
- Full name: Jonathan Morgan
- Date of birth: 10 July 1970 (age 56)
- Place of birth: Cardiff, Wales
- Position: Midfielder

Youth career
- 1986–1988: Cardiff City

Senior career*
Years	Team	Apps	(Gls)
1988–1991	Cardiff City	73	(3)
- * Club domestic league appearances and goals

Jonathan Morgan (born 10 July 1970) is a Welsh former professional footballer who played as a midfielder. During his career, he made over 70 appearances in the Football League for Cardiff City. He retired from playing at the age of 26 and later became a teacher. In 2022, he was appointed principal of Coleg y Cymoedd.

== TV Career ==
As a child he starred in a storybook international film titled The Pedlars Dream with iconic Welsh actor Dewi 'Pws' Morris.

== Professional Football Career ==
Morgan was born in Cardiff and was a Cardiff City season ticket holder on the bob bank from the age of seven. As a schoolboy he represented Wales under 15 and featured in the same team as Jason Perry and Chris Coleman. He left school at the age of 15 and signed for Cardiff on a two-year apprenticeship shortly before his 16th birthday, before being given his first professional contract at the age of 18 in 1988. He captained the youth team in 1987-88 and scored 3 goals in the final two games of the season against Swansea City to give Cardiff the 'double' securing the inaugural Welsh National Youth League and Cup. In the same season, City beat Wrexham 2-1 in the Welsh Youth Cup final in Knighton. He represented Wales at under 18 youth level and played alongside Gary Speed, Bryan Law and Tony Roberts. He made his professional debut for the club on 28 September 1988, playing in a 3–0 defeat against Queens Park Rangers in the Football League Cup, before making his UEFA Cup Winners Cup debut against Derry City on 5 October 1988. He made his league debut 3 days later in a 2–1 defeat to Reading on 8 October 1988. His first goal for the club came the following season, netting from outside the box in a 1–1 draw with Birmingham City on 31 October 1989. He was a regular throughout the campaign, appearing 32 times in the Football League Third Division as Cardiff suffered relegation after finishing in 21st position. However, a persistent ankle injury led to his early retirement from professional football at the age of 22. His final professional appearance came in a 2–0 victory over Gillingham on 15 February 1991.

== Career statistics ==
Appearances and goals by club, season and competition
Club	Season	League			FA Cup		EFL Cup		Other		Total	
Club	Season	Division	Apps	Goals	Apps	Goals	Apps	Goals	Apps	Goals	Apps	Goals
Cardiff City	1988–89	Third Division	19	0	0	0	2	0	2	0	23	0
Cardiff City	1989–90	Third Division	32	3	5	0	2	0	5	0	44	3
Cardiff City	1990–91	Fourth Division	4	0	0	0	1	0	1	0	6	0
Career total			55	3	5	0	5	0	8	0	73	3

== Semi Professional Football Career ==
Due to a persistent ankle injury, after leaving Cardiff City in June 1991, he signed for Merthyr Tydfil, in the Vauxhall Conference and later went on loan that season to Gloucester City. In July 1992, he signed a three-year contract with Inter Cardiff. He gained a runners up medal in the League of Wales in 1992/93 and 1993/4. During this period, he played twice for Wales C (semi professional team) against England. He failed to play a single game for Inter Cardiff in 1994/5 due to an ankle injury which would later force his retirement at the 26. In 1995/6, he played for Cardiff Metropolitan University 'invisibles', winning the Welsh League 3rd Division without losing a game.

== Later life ==
Morgan enrolled at Cardiff Metropolitan University in September 1992, where he attained a first class honours degree in recreation and leisure management and a master's in sports and leisure studies. Following his graduation, he completed a PGCE and took up a number of sport teaching roles in Hertfordshire, before returning to Wales as the Head of Faculty at Ystrad Mynach College in November 2002. He was promoted to vice principal of Coleg y Cymoedd in 2019, where he served for three years before being appointed principal in 2022.
