= Neil Matthews =

Neil Matthews is the name of:

- Neil Matthews (footballer, born 1966) (1966–2023), English footballer who played as a forward
- Neil Matthews (footballer, born 1967) (born 1967), English-Northern Irish footballer who played as a defender
- Neal Matthews Jr., American vocalist
