= Coleg Morgannwg =

Former further education college in Wales

- Type: further education
- Location: Rhondda Cynon Taf, Wales
- Website: http://www.morgannwg.ac.uk

Coleg Morgannwg (Welsh for 'Glamorgan college') is a former further education college located at four main campuses across Rhondda Cynon Taf, Wales. In 2013, Coleg Morgannwg merged with Ystrad Mynach College to become Coleg y Cymoedd.

The college's main campuses were located in Aberdare, Nantgarw, Pontypridd, and Llwynypia. The college also operated a number of outreach centres within local communities. Courses offered by the college included NVQs, GCSEs, BTECs, A levels and access courses.

The Nantgarw campus opened in September 2012, costing £40m to be built. £20m of funding was provided by the Welsh Government through a 2009 grant scheme. The campus offered 24 subjects for A-Level students.

Ystrad Mynach College and Coleg Morgannwg began discussing a merger in 2011 and confirmed the merge in 2013. The new college was named Coleg y Cymoedd, meaning "College of the Valleys". The new college reopened in August 2013 with a capacity of over 25,000 students.

== Notable alumni ==
- Derek Brockway - BBC Wales Meteorologist and TV presenter
- Lyn Evans - Welsh scientist who served as the project leader of the Large Hadron Collider in Switzerland
