= Tim Parkin =

English footballer

Personal information
- Full name: Timothy John Parkin
- Date of birth: 31 December 1957 (age 68)
- Place of birth: Penrith, Cumberland, England
- Height: 6 ft 1 in (1.85 m)
- Position: Defender

Youth career
- 1974–1976: Blackburn Rovers

Senior career*
Years	Team	Apps	(Gls)
1976–1980	Blackburn Rovers	13	(0)
1977	→ Fort Lauderdale Strikers (loan)	4	(0)
1980–1981	Malmö FF	41	(1)
1981	Almondsbury Greenway	0	(0)
1981–1986	Bristol Rovers	206	(12)
1986–1989	Swindon Town	110	(6)
1989–1992	Port Vale	48	(1)
1991	→ Shrewsbury Town (loan)	5	(0)
1992–1993	Darlington	40	(2)
1993–1994	Barrow		
Total		467+	(22+)

Managerial career
- 1993: Darlington (caretaker)
- * Club domestic league appearances and goals

Timothy John Parkin (born 31 December 1957) is an English former footballer. A defender, he made 422 league appearances in a 14-year career in the English Football League, and also spent two years playing in Sweden.

He began his career at Blackburn Rovers in 1976 before moving to Swedish club Malmö FF in January 1980. He featured in the final of the Intercontinental Cup, won the Svenska Cupen in 1980, and helped the club to a second-place finish in the Allsvenskan. He returned to England to sign with Bristol Rovers via Almondsbury Greenway in August 1981. Five years later, he moved on to Swindon Town for a £27,500 fee and helped the club to win promotion out of the Third Division via the play-offs in 1987. He was purchased by Port Vale for £60,000 in December 1989, who loaned him out to Shrewsbury Town in October 1991. He joined Darlington on a free transfer in May 1992 and served as the club's co-caretaker manager in October 1993. He signed with non-League side Barrow the next month before retiring due to injury. He later became a police officer.

== Career ==
=== Blackburn Rovers ===
Parkin passed a two-year apprenticeship to win a professional contract at Blackburn Rovers to earn a contract under manager Jim Smith in March 1976. He made his competitive debut at Bristol Rovers on 8 March 1976. Rovers finished 12th in the Second Division in 1976–77, before rising up to fifth place in 1977–78. The club suffered relegation under new boss John Pickering in 1978–79, before Howard Kendall took charge in his first job in management. In his three years at Ewood Park, Parkin made 13 league appearances, all but one of which were as a stand-in for the injured Glenn Keeley towards the end of the 1978–79 season.

=== Malmö FF ===
In January 1980, he joined Swedish side Malmö FF, who were then managed by an Englishman Bob Houghton. He played the second leg of the 1979 Intercontinental Cup final (played in March 1980), which ended in defeat to Paraguayan club Club Olimpia. He also featured in the 1980 Svenska Cupen final, which ended in a penalty shoot-out victory over IK Brage at the Råsunda Stadium. The "Blues" also finished second in the league in 1980, two points behind Östers IF.

=== Bristol Rovers ===
Parkin left Malmö Stadion and returned to England in August 1981 with Bristol Rovers, though had to spend a day as an Almondsbury Greenway player to get around rules governing Swedish transfers. The "Pirates" finished 15th in the Third Division in 1981–82 under the stewardship of manager Bobby Gould. The "Gas" rose to seventh in 1982–83, before David Williams was put in charge. He led the club to fifth and sixth place finishes in 1983–84 and 1984–85. Bobby Gould was then re-appointed as manager but could only lead Rovers to a 16th-place finish in 1985–86. In five years at Eastville Stadium, Parkin played 206 league games and was named the club's Player of the Year for 1985 and 1986.

=== Swindon Town ===
He transferred to Swindon Town for a £27,500 fee in July 1986. He formed a consistent centre-back partnership with Colin Calderwood, and played 48 games in 1986–87. The "Robins" won promotion out of the Third Division after beating Gillingham 2–0 at Selhurst Park in the play-off final. He was voted Player of the Season after he scored four goals in 54 games in 1987–88, as Lou Macari's side secured a comfortable mid-table position. He featured 36 times in 1988–89, as Swindon reached the play-offs, where they were beaten by Crystal Palace. Osvaldo Ardiles then took charge at County Ground, who preferred to play Jon Gittens instead of Parkin.

=== Port Vale ===
He was signed by Port Vale for £60,000 in December 1989. Manager John Rudge used him only 12 times in the Second Division in 1989–90. He became a regular in the first-team from October 1990, and played 32 times in 1990–91. However, he lost his place in August 1991 and was loaned out to Shrewsbury Town the next month, featuring in five Third Division games for John Bond's "Shrews" at the Gay Meadow. He returned to Vale Park the next month only to be handed a free transfer in May 1992, having played just eight games for the "Valiants" in the 1991–92 relegation campaign.

=== Darlington ===
He moved onto Darlington, where he was made player-coach. The "Quakers" finished 15th in the Third Division in 1992–93. Parkin took caretaker control of the team in October 1993 (with Gerry Forrest) when Billy McEwan was dismissed; Forrest and Parkin took charge of the first-team for four matches before Alan Murray took over permanently. Murray could only take the club to one place above the bottom of the English Football League in 1993–94. Parkin departed Feethams and moved on to Barrow of the Northern Premier League in November 1993, where he was made player-assistant manager, before retiring as a player following a broken leg.

== Post-retirement ==
After retiring, Parkin was appointed football in the community officer at Middlesbrough. He then joined the Cumbria Constabulary in September 1994.

== Career statistics ==
Appearances and goals by club, season and competition
Club	Season	League			FA Cup		Other		Total	
Club	Season	Division	Apps	Goals	Apps	Goals	Apps	Goals	Apps	Goals
Blackburn Rovers	1976–77	Second Division	1	0	0	0	0	0	1	0
Blackburn Rovers	1977–78	Second Division	0	0	0	0	0	0	0	0
Blackburn Rovers	1978–79	Second Division	12	0	0	0	0	0	12	0
Blackburn Rovers	Total		13	0	0	0	0	0	13	0
Fort Lauderdale Strikers (loan)	1977	NASL	4	0	—		—		4	0
Bristol Rovers	1981–82	Third Division	40	2	0	0	3	1	43	3
Bristol Rovers	1982–83	Third Division	41	3	3	0	4	1	48	4
Bristol Rovers	1983–84	Third Division	39	2	3	0	6	0	48	2
Bristol Rovers	1984–85	Third Division	43	3	3	0	6	0	52	3
Bristol Rovers	1985–86	Third Division	43	2	4	0	6	0	53	2
Bristol Rovers	Total		206	12	13	0	25	2	244	14
Swindon Town	1986–87	Third Division	32	2	3	0	13	0	48	2
Swindon Town	1987–88	Third Division	40	2	3	0	11	2	54	4
Swindon Town	1988–89	Third Division	32	1	0	0	4	0	36	1
Swindon Town	1989–90	Third Division	6	1	0	0	0	0	6	1
Swindon Town	Total		110	6	6	0	28	2	144	8
Port Vale	1989–90	Second Division	12	1	0	0	0	0	12	1
Port Vale	1990–91	Second Division	29	0	2	0	1	0	32	0
Port Vale	1991–92	Second Division	7	0	0	0	1	0	8	0
Port Vale	Total		48	1	2	0	2	0	52	1
Shrewsbury Town (loan)	1991–92	Third Division	5	0	0	0	2	0	7	0
Darlington	1992–93	Third Division	40	2	1	0	3	0	44	2
Career total			426	21	22	0	60	4	508	25

== Honours ==
Malmö FF

- Intercontinental Cup runner-up: 1979
- Svenska Cupen: 1980

Swindon Town

- Football League Third Division play-offs: 1987

Individual

- Swindon Town Player of the Season: 1987–88
