= Eddie Gibbins =

English footballer (1926–2011)

Personal information
- Full name: Edward Gibbins
- Date of birth: 24 March 1926
- Place of birth: Shoreditch, England
- Date of death: 7 August 2011 (aged 85)
- Place of death: Kingston St Mary, England
- Position: Centre half

Senior career*
Years	Team	Apps	(Gls)
- Finchley
1946–1953	Tottenham Hotspur	1	(0)
- → Chelmsford City (loan)

Managerial career
- 1962–1963: Edmonton
- 1963–1964: Hounslow
- 1966–1970: Hayes
- * Club domestic league appearances and goals

Edward "Eddie" Gibbins (24 March 1926 – 7 August 2011) was an English professional footballer who played for Finchley and Tottenham Hotspur. He was born in Shoreditch and died in Kingston St Mary.

== Football career ==
Gibbins joined Tottenham Hotspur from non-league club Finchley in September 1946. The centre half played four senior matches in all competitions for the Lilywhites between 1952 and 1953.

Following his retirement, Gibbins managed local London based sides Edmonton, Hounslow and Hayes.

== Post–football career ==
Gibbins was employed by a fuel transport company based in Tottenham up to his retirement. In recent years he had lived in Taunton before his death at a nursing home on 7 August 2011 in Kingston St Mary. One of Gibbins' sons, Roger, later joined Tottenham before going on to make over 400 appearances in the Football League.
