= Coleg y Cymoedd =

Further education college in Wales

- Coleg y Cymoedd Logo
- Type: Further Education College
- Established: 2013
- Principal: Jon Morgan, 2022–present
- Administrative staff: 800
- Students: 10,000
- Location: Wales
- Website: https://www.cymoedd.ac.uk/

Coleg y Cymoedd (Welsh for 'college of the valleys') is a further education college located at four main campuses across Rhondda Cynon Taf, and Caerphilly, Wales. Coleg y Cymoedd was formed after the merger of Coleg Morgannwg and Ystrad Mynach College in September 2013.

== Campuses ==
The college's main campuses are the Aberdare Campus (51.7236°N 3.4686°W), Nantgarw Campus (51.5642°N 3.2734°W), Rhondda Campus, Llwynypia (51.6391°N 3.4543°W), and the Ystrad Mynach Campus.

== Courses ==
Courses offered by the college include NVQs, GCSEs, BTECs, A levels, Access Courses, Higher Education courses (Higher National Certificate), Foundation Degree and Bachelor's degree. Subject areas on offer include:-Access, Art, AS/A2 Levels, Basic Skills, Beauty Therapy, Business Studies, Catering & Hospitality, Computing, Construction, Childcare, Education & Training, Engineering, ESOL, Hairdressing, Health & Social Care, Higher Education, Office Administration, Motor Vehicle, Public Services, Sport, Travel & Tourism and Welsh.

Coleg y Cymoedd offer a range of Higher Education courses across its campuses. You can study for HNC/D, Foundation Degrees and Degrees in a variety of areas. Coleg y Cymoedd provides higher education courses with a number of partners including Cardiff Metropolitan University and UHOVI, part of the University of South Wales. Coleg y Cymoedd is a collaborative partner of the University of South Wales.

== Principals ==
- Jon Morgan.2022 – Present
- Karen Phillips. 2019 – 2022
- Judith Evans. 2013 – 2018

== Building Work and Development ==
Several building development projects were undertaken by the former institutions. Some of these development include:-

Campus Redevelopment Ystrad Mynach

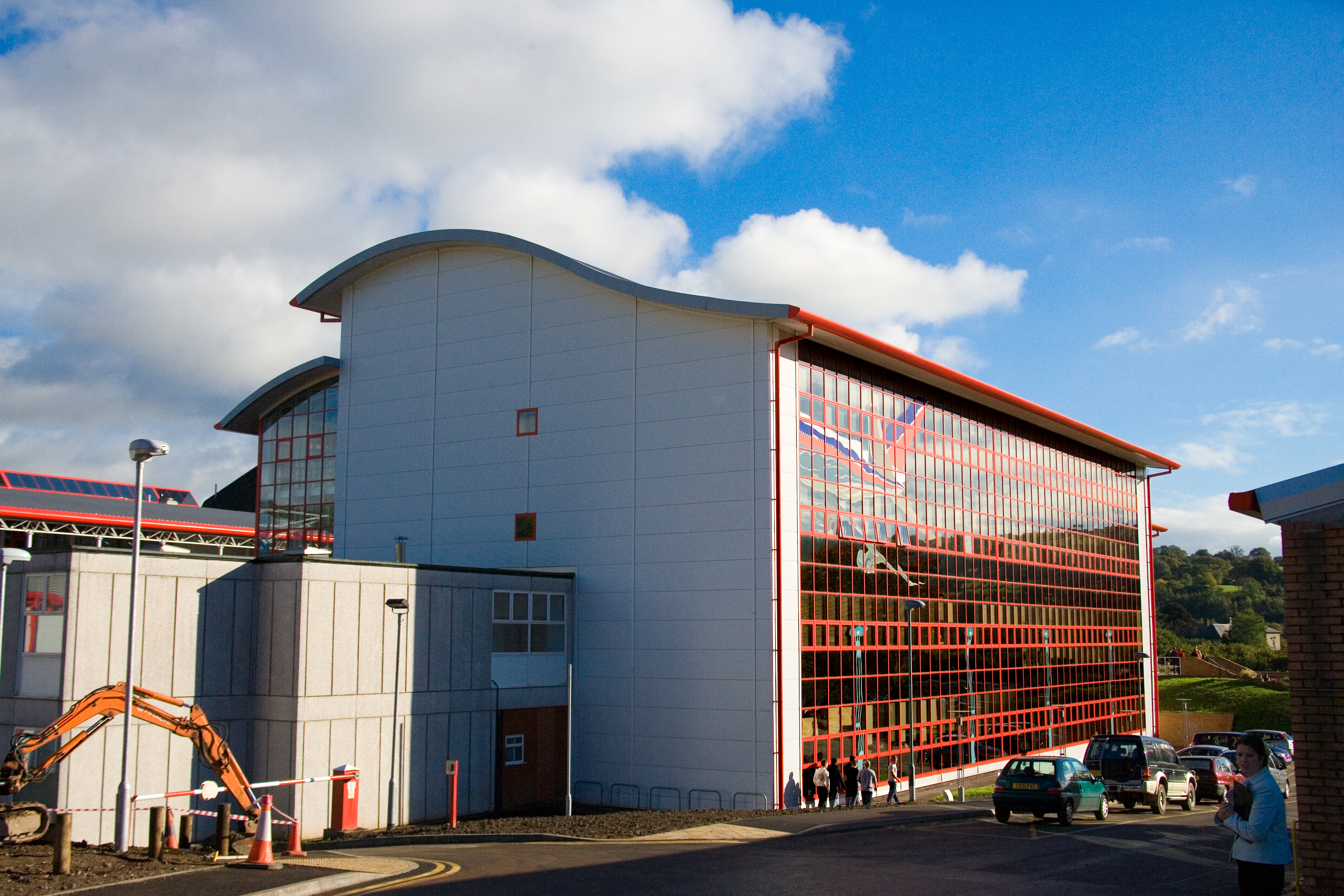
Photo taken 2008

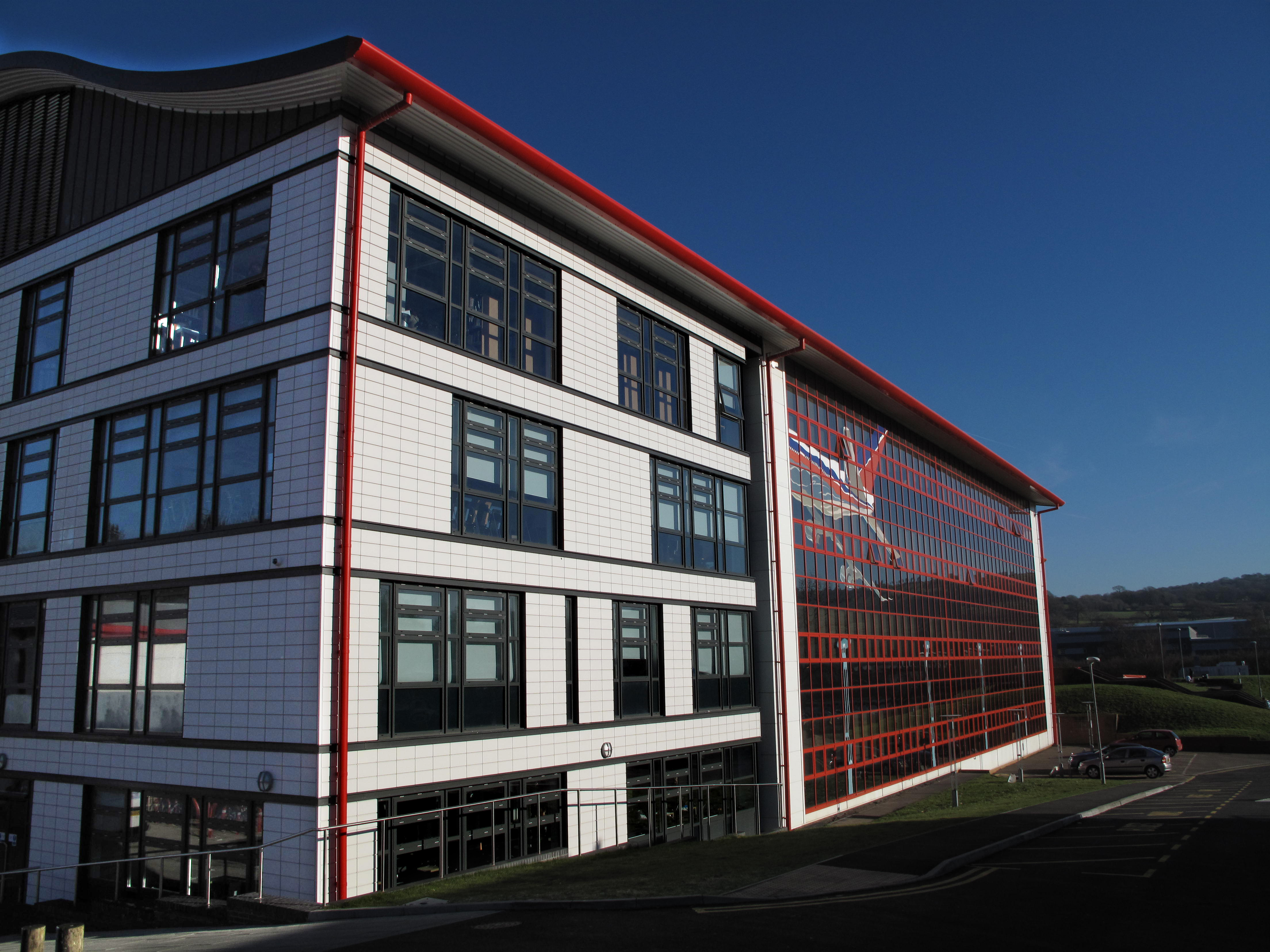
Photo taken 2012

== 2009–2010 ==
Campus Redevelopment Ystrad Mynach Campus
Building work commenced in June 2009 on a new B Block facility costing £7.2M housing 13 classrooms, a new library, improved catering facilities and public areas for learners, exhibitions, competitions and public events.

== 2010–2012 ==
Taff Ely Learning Campus Nantgarw

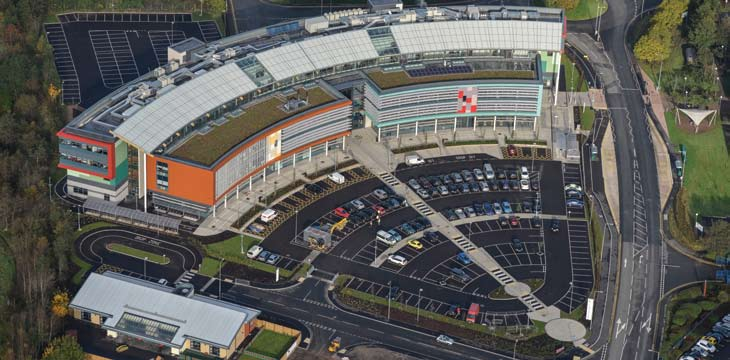
Coleg y Cymoedd Nantgarw Campus

Work commenced in 2010 on a new £40m campus based in Parc Nantgarw, Nantgarw, at the time the largest single investment in Further Education in Wales. Built on almost 8 acres of land opposite existing Aerospace, Construction and Engineering buildings, the project was financed through £27.8m Welsh Government and £6.7m European Regional Development Fund.

Opening its doors to the first cohort of learners in September 2012, the Nantgarw Campus is one of the most modern Further Education campus buildings in Wales.

== 2015–Present ==
Redevelopment of Aberdare Campus In December 2013. Coleg y Cymoedd announced intentions to build a new £20 million campus in the heart of Aberdare town centre and replace its existing facility at Cwmdare. Coleg y Cymoedd's intention is to regenerate the currently derelict 2.7-acre site to serve up to 800 learners, incorporating industry standard facilities to further enrich the education, skills and training offered at the old campus. The building was completed in 2017 and was 50 percent funded by the Welsh Government as part of the 21st century schools program.

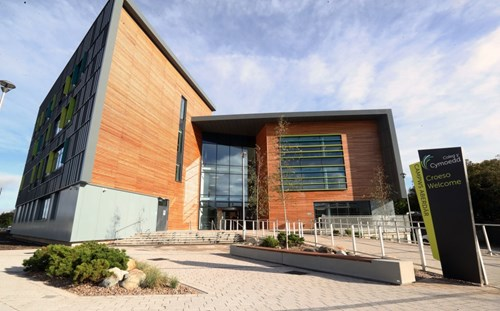
Coleg Y Cymoedd Aberdare Campus

Creation of Motor Vehicle Training Facility at Ystrad Mynach Campus
In July 2014, Coleg y Cymoedd announced a new motor vehicle training facility planned for its Ystrad Mynach campus [link to news article]. The £2.1 million facility would replace the college's existing facility based at the Rhymney campus. The new centre is planned to include maintenance, diagnostics and testing workshops.

Creation of Railway Facility at Nantgarw Campus
Coleg y Cymoedd commenced in September 2014 a new course programme in partnership with McGinley Support Services to deliver Rail Apprenticeships at its Nantgarw campus. A purpose built facility will be built at the Nantgarw campus to accommodate learners for September 2015 onwards.

Creation of Sporting of Excellence Centre at Nantgarw Campus

In March 2021, building work commenced at Nantgarw campus to build a £5.1m Centre of Sporting Excellence, opposite the existing 2012 campus main building. It is scheduled to be completed by June 2022. Funded entirely by Cymoedd, the centre will consist of a two-storey building featuring a sports hall, fully equipped gym and classroom teaching facilities, primarily used by sport students. However, a lot of other courses will have access to these facilities.

== Notable alumni ==
- Derek Brockway – BBC Wales Meteorologist and TV presenter
