= Steve Cuggy =

English footballer and manager

Michael Steven Cuggy (born 18 March 1971) is an English footballer and former manager of Blyth Spartans. He played professionally for Maidstone United, making a total of 13 Football League appearances.
