= Peter Coyne (footballer) =

English footballer (born 1958)

Personal information
- Full name: Peter David Coyne
- Date of birth: 13 November 1958 (age 68)
- Place of birth: Manchester, England
- Height: 5 ft 9 in (1.75 m)
- Position: Forward

Youth career
- 1973–1976: Manchester United

Senior career*
Years	Team	Apps	(Gls)
1975–1977	Manchester United	2	(1)
1977	Ashton United		
1977–1981	Crewe Alexandra	134	(47)
1978	Los Angeles Aztecs	11	(1)
1981–1984	Hyde United	105	(51)
1984–1990	Swindon Town	110	(30)
1989–1990	→ Aldershot (loan)	3	(0)
1990–?	Colne Dynamoes		
1990	→ Macclesfield Town (loan)	3	(0)
- Glossop North End
- Radcliffe Borough
- Wilmslow Albion
- * Club domestic league appearances and goals

Peter David Coyne (born 13 November 1958) is an English former footballer. His regular position was as a forward. He was born in Manchester. He played for Manchester United, Ashton United, Crewe Alexandra, Hyde United, Swindon Town and Glossop North End.

== Career ==
=== Crewe Alexandra ===
Coyne was signed from Ashton United in 1977 and made his Crewe debut in a 3–1 victory over AFC Bournemouth at Gresty Road on 20 August 1977. Two weeks later, on 3 September he scored his first two Crewe goals as the Railwaymen lost 4–6 to Brentford. He scored a further 14 goals that season, finishing as Crewe's top scorer, and then repeated both feats the following season (1978–79) as Crewe finished bottom of the Fourth Division. Crewe improved slightly (to a still dismal 23rd) in the 1979–80 season but Coyne contributed just two goals in 31 appearances. In his final season at Gresty Road, Coyne made 34 appearances, scoring 12 goals including four in a 5–0 win over Hereford United on 7 October 1980. He then joined Hyde United. In total, he played 134 league games for Crewe, scoring 47 times.

=== Swindon Town ===
Coyne's main success came at Swindon Town, when Lou Macari signed him from Hyde United on 23 August 1984. In season 1984–85 he scored 15 goals (including a run of five consecutive games in March) and finished as the club's 2nd highest scorer that season, and followed that up in season 1985–86 with another 14 goals (including a hat-trick at home to Northampton), and won a 4th Division championship medal with Swindon. His goal on the final day, at home to former club Crewe which Swindon won 1–0, ensured Swindon finished the season on a record-breaking 102 points.

In the 1986–87 season, he scored another 12 goals helping Swindon to back to back promotions, this time to Division 2. He scored both goals in the opening day fixture away to Bolton Wanderers and probably his most important goal was against Gillingham at the County Ground when he equalised in the play-off final second leg, Swindon eventually won the third match 2–0 to clinch promotion.

Coyne only made 6 appearances in the 1987–88 season in Division 2, and his last appearance ever for Swindon was away at West Bromwich Albion on 3 September 1988 (his only appearance in the 1988–89 season). He went out on loan to Aldershot in August 1989 and was eventually released by Swindon in June 1990 when he joined Colne Dynamoes, and later Radcliffe Borough, Glossop North End, and finally Wilmslow Albion.

== Personal life ==
His brother, Gerald (Ged) was a professional at both Manchester United and Manchester City and later managed several clubs in the Manchester area including East Manchester, Curzon Ashton, Mossley and Hyde United.

== Retirement ==
After retiring from football, Coyne then took his coaching badges with the PFA before starting work with Manchester United Football in the Community scheme where he gained valuable experience working with young people and footballers with a disability.

After leaving Manchester United, Coyne now works at Manchester Airport. As UEFA B Licence holder, Coyne still actively coaches in the local area, both at primary schools and local junior club, Didsbury Juniors FC.

== Honours ==
Swindon Town

- Football League Third Division play-offs: 1987
- Football League Fourth Division: 1985–86
