= David Hill (footballer, born 1965) =

English footballer (born 1965)

Personal information
- Full name: David Hill
- Date of birth: 25 May 1965 (age 61)
- Place of birth: Bradford, England
- Position: Forward

Senior career*
Years	Team	Apps	(Gls)
1982–1983	Bradford City	5	(1)
- * Club domestic league appearances and goals

David Hill (born 25 May 1965) is an English former professional footballer who played as a forward.

== Career ==
Born in Bradford, Hill signed for Bradford City in January 1982 after participating in their Youth Opportunity Scheme, leaving the club in December 1983 to trial with Barnsley. During his time with Bradford City he made five appearances in the Football League, scoring one goal; he also made one appearance in the FA Cup.

== Sources ==
- Frost, Terry (1988). Bradford City A Complete Record 1903-1988. Breedon Books Sport. ISBN 0-907969-38-0.
