= John Ashdjian =

English footballer

Personal information
- Date of birth: 13 September 1972 (age 54)
- Place of birth: Hackney, England
- Position: Winger

Senior career*
Years	Team	Apps	(Gls)
1990	Northampton Town	0	(0)
1991–1994	Scarborough	67	(14)
- Kettering Town
- * Club domestic league appearances and goals

John Ashdjian (born 13 September 1972) is an English former footballer who played in the Football League for Scarborough.
