= Mark Hine =

English footballer (1964–2025)

Personal information
- Full name: Mark Hine
- Date of birth: 18 May 1964
- Place of birth: Middlesbrough, England
- Date of death: 10 September 2025 (aged 61)
- Height: 5 ft 8 in (1.73 m)
- Position: Midfielder

Senior career*
Years	Team	Apps	(Gls)
1982–1983	Billingham Town		
1983	Whitley Bay		
1984–1986	Grimsby Town	22	(1)
1986–1989	Darlington	128	(8)
1989–1991	Peterborough United	55	(7)
1991–1992	Scunthorpe United	22	(2)
1992–1993	Doncaster Rovers	25	(1)
1993–1996	Gateshead		
1996–1998	Stalybridge Celtic	61	(1)
1998–1999	Spennymoor United		
1999–	Whitley Bay		
–2000	Gateshead		
2000–	Goole		
–2001	Harrogate Town		
2001–2002	Armthorpe Welfare		
2002–2003	Frickley Athletic		
2003–2006	Armthorpe Welfare		

International career
- England C
- * Club domestic league appearances and goals

Mark Hine (18 May 1964 – 10 September 2025) was an English professional footballer who played as a midfielder. He made more than 250 appearances in the Football League.

== Career ==
Hine began his career at non-League clubs Billingham Town and Whitley Bay before signing for Grimsby Town in 1983.

After retiring from professional football, Hine played for Gateshead, Stalybridge Celtic, Spennymoor United, Whitley Bay, Goole, Harrogate Town, Armthorpe Welfare and Frickley Athletic, before returning to Armthorpe Welfare as player-assistant manager in 2003. He also earned caps for the England C national team.

After leaving Armthorpe in 2006, Hine served as a coach at Hatfield Main and Brodsworth Welfare.

== Death ==
Hine died on 10 September 2025, at the age of 61.
