= Charlie Henry (footballer, born 1962) =

English footballer (born 1962)

Personal information
- Full name: Charles Anthony Henry
- Date of birth: 13 February 1962 (age 64)
- Place of birth: Acton, London, England
- Height: 5 ft 11 in (1.80 m)
- Positions: Full back; attacking midfielder

Youth career
- –: Swindon Town

Senior career*
Years	Team	Apps	(Gls)
1980–1989	Swindon Town	223	(26)
1987	→ Torquay United (loan)	6	(1)
1987	→ Northampton Town (loan)	4	(1)
1989–1992	Aldershot	81	(18)
–	Cheltenham Town		
–	Fairford Town		
- * Club domestic league appearances and goals

Charles Anthony Henry (born 13 February 1962) is an English former professional footballer, born in Acton, London, who played in the Football League for Swindon Town, Torquay United, Northampton Town and Aldershot.

== Career ==
Henry began his career as an apprentice with Swindon Town, turning professional in February 1980. He made his league debut as a second-half substitute for Brian Hughes, against Reading at Elm Park on 30 August 1980.

Originally a full-back, Henry was converted into an attacking central midfielder by Swindon manager Lou Macari, and went to score 27 goals for the "Robins" in 269 games. He was the top goalscorer in the Fourth Division championship-winning side in the 1984–85 season, but fell out of favour and joined Torquay United on loan in February 1987, playing six games as Stuart Morgan's side battled against relegation with little money for new signings.

He joined Northampton Town on loan the following month, but returned to Swindon and played in the play-off final at the end of the season, scoring from 20 yards against Gillingham as Swindon won promotion to the Second Division.

He left the County Ground before the 1989–90 season, joining Aldershot for a fee of £25,000. He scored 18 times in 81 league games over the following two seasons, and a further 2 goals from 35 games which were expunged from his record as Aldershot's financial problems saw them fail to complete the 1991–92 season. He later played non-league football for Cheltenham Town and Fairford Town.

Henry's son Leigh was on Swindon's books as a youngster, but the closest he came to League football was as an unused substitute; he went on to join non-league club Swindon Supermarine.

== Honours ==
Swindon Town

- Football League Third Division play-offs: 1987
- Football League Fourth Division: 1985–86
