= Ystrad Mynach College =

Former college in Wales

Coordinates: 51.63459°N 3.24023°W

The College Ystrad Mynach
- Ystrad Mynach College Logo
- Type: further education college
- Principal: Bryn Davies
- Administrative staff: 500
- Students: 13,000
- Location: Twyn Road; Ystrad Mynach CF82 7XR, Ystrad Mynach, Caerphilly County Borough Council, Wales
- Website: http://www.ystrad-mynach.ac.uk/

The College Ystrad Mynach is a former college of further education based in Ystrad Mynach in Caerphilly county borough, Wales. It had over 13,000 students ranging from school leavers to adult mature students. It taught mainly vocational courses from entry level to Degree (in collaboration with Cardiff Metropolitan University, and the University of South Wales).

In 2013, Ystrad Mynach College merged with Coleg Morgannwg to become Coleg y Cymoedd.

== Courses ==
The college offered courses in the following areas:

- ACCESS to Higher Education
- Art
- A/S Levels & A2 A Levels
- Basic Skills
- Beauty therapy & Holistic Therapy
- Business studies
- Catering & Hospitality
- Computing
- Construction
- Child Care
- Education & Training
- Engineering
- English for Speakers of Other Languages
- GCSEs
- Hairdressing
- Health & Social Care
- ACS Gas & Environmental and Renewable courses
- Higher Education
- Office Technology
- Motor Vehicle
- Public Services
- Sport
- Travel & Tourism
- Welsh language
- Welsh Baccalaureate

== History ==
The college was opened in 1959 to meet the needs of the local coal mining industry. Since the 1970s the curriculum diversified to assist the diversification and development of the locality. The college worked closely with Caerphilly County Borough Council to improve the economic future of the County Borough.

== Building Work ==
The College Ystrad Mynach underwent extensive building work to areas of its campus in recent years.

2001 – A Block

A Block

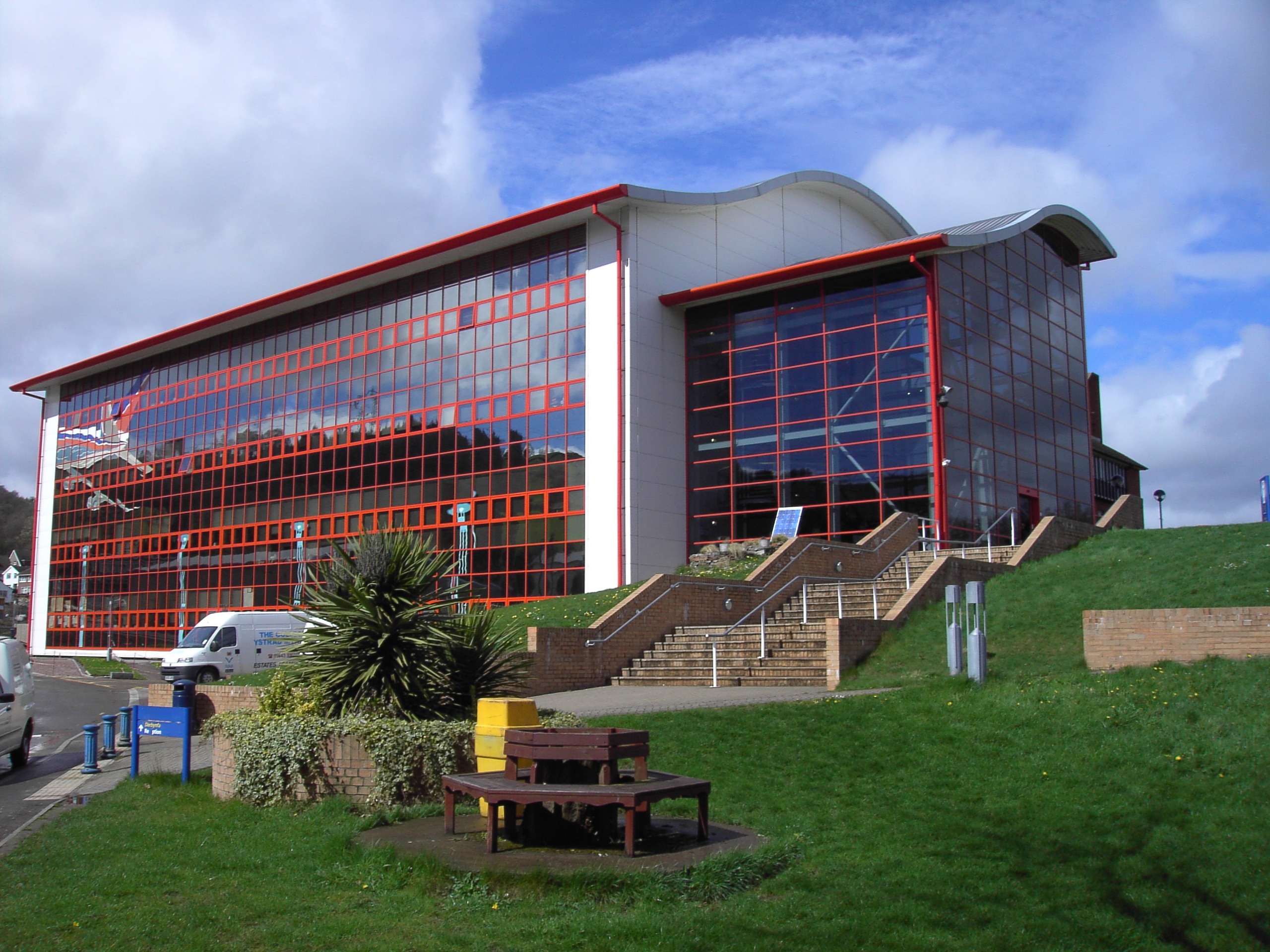
Photo taken 2012

Housing the main reception, administration offices and some teaching areas, A Block had a complete refurbishment in 2001. The refurbishment costing £2.5 million transformed the block from its previous state which was first built in 1959.

2002 – Cafe Quarter Officially opened by former Caerphilly AM Ron Davies, a new Cafe Quarter was completed in 2002 providing students with improved catering facilities.

2003 – S Block Graddfa Site

Following the merging of Lewis School sites into one location at Pengam, The college purchased a site previously used by Lewis School that was located adjacent to The College Ystrad Mynach (previously Graddfa Secondary Modern School). With student enrolments for The College Ystrad Mynach increasing in the years before 2003, the Graddfa site provided additional space. Following months of extensive renovations to bring the site to an acceptable standard, the site was used as a teaching area from August 2003, housing GCSE, A Level, Education and Training, Languages and Art Provision. The College Ystrad Mynach acquired a grant during the renovation work to build additional changing rooms. These changing rooms serve not only The college but the numerous sports teams that use Ystrad Mynach park for activities on Saturday's and Sunday's.

2004 – D Block

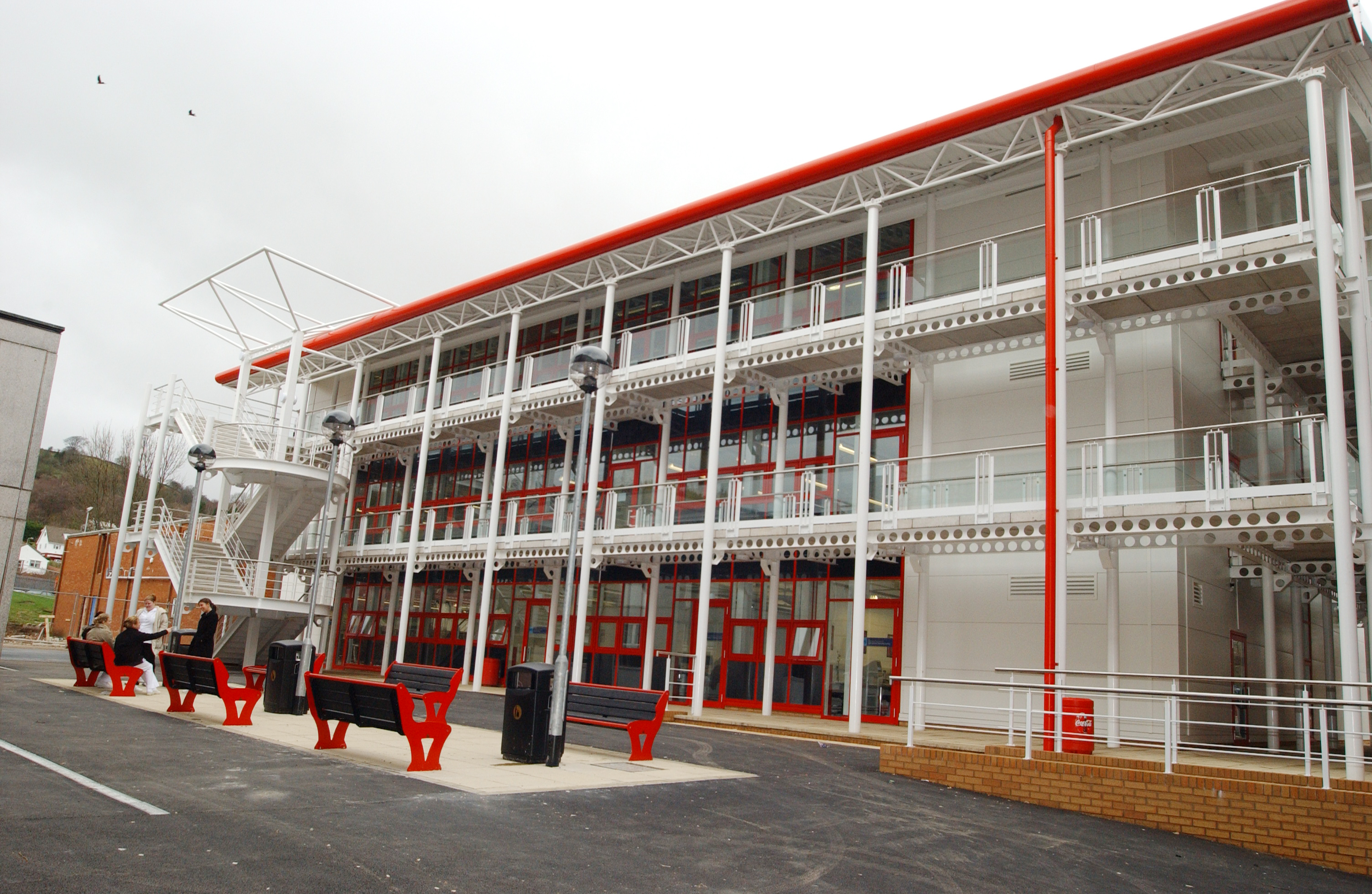
D Block Building 2004

A 3-storey Technology Building titled ‘D Block’ was completed in January 2004 at a cost of £2 million replacing a previous 2-storey building that had been standing since 1959. The block currently serves Construction, Electronics, Aerospace, Electrical and Design courses.

2009–2010 – B Block

B Block

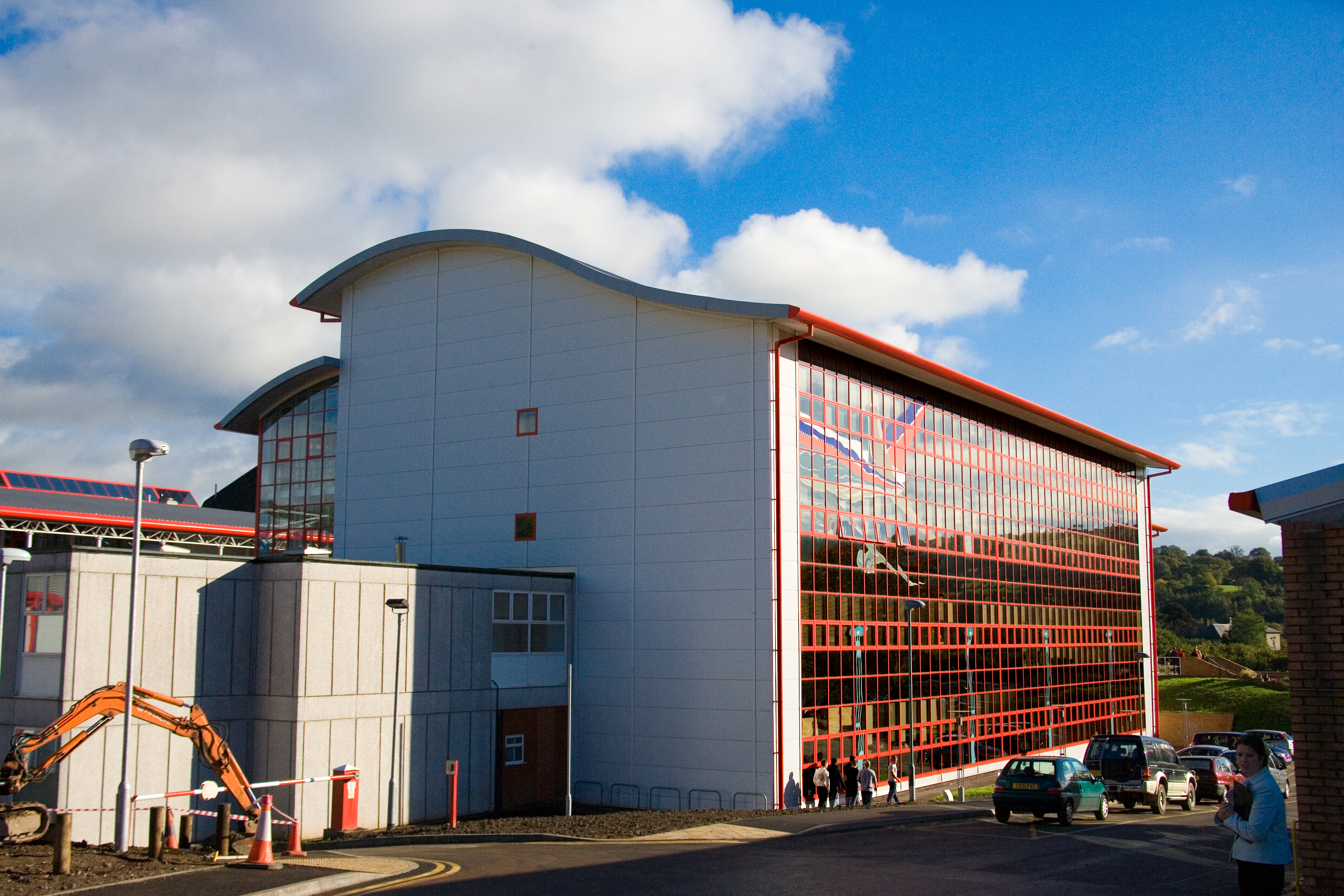
Photo taken 2008

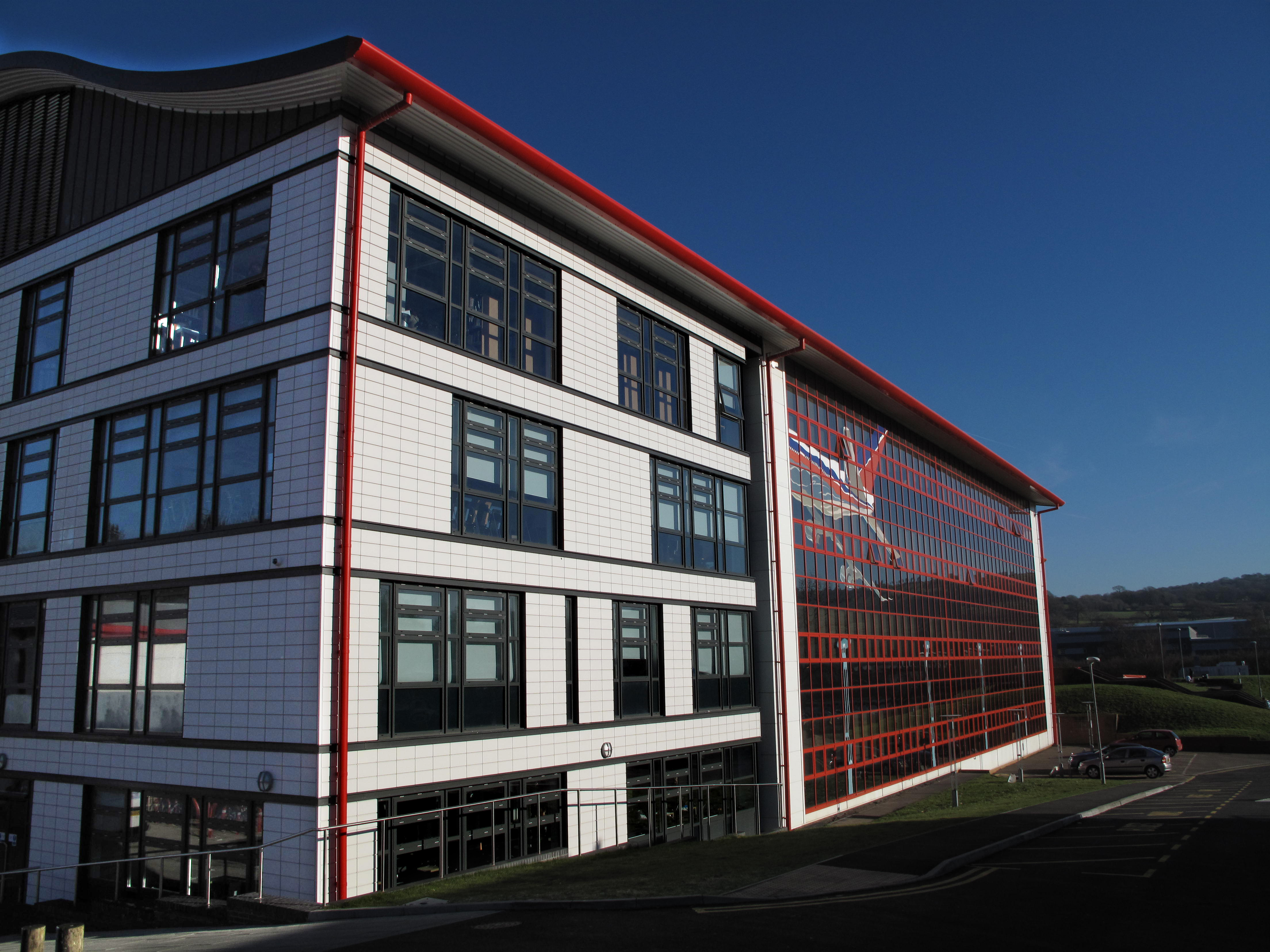
Photo taken 2012

Building work commenced in June 2009 on a new B Block facility costing £7.2M which houses 13 classrooms, a new library, improved catering facilities and public areas for learners, exhibitions, competitions and public events.

== Principals ==
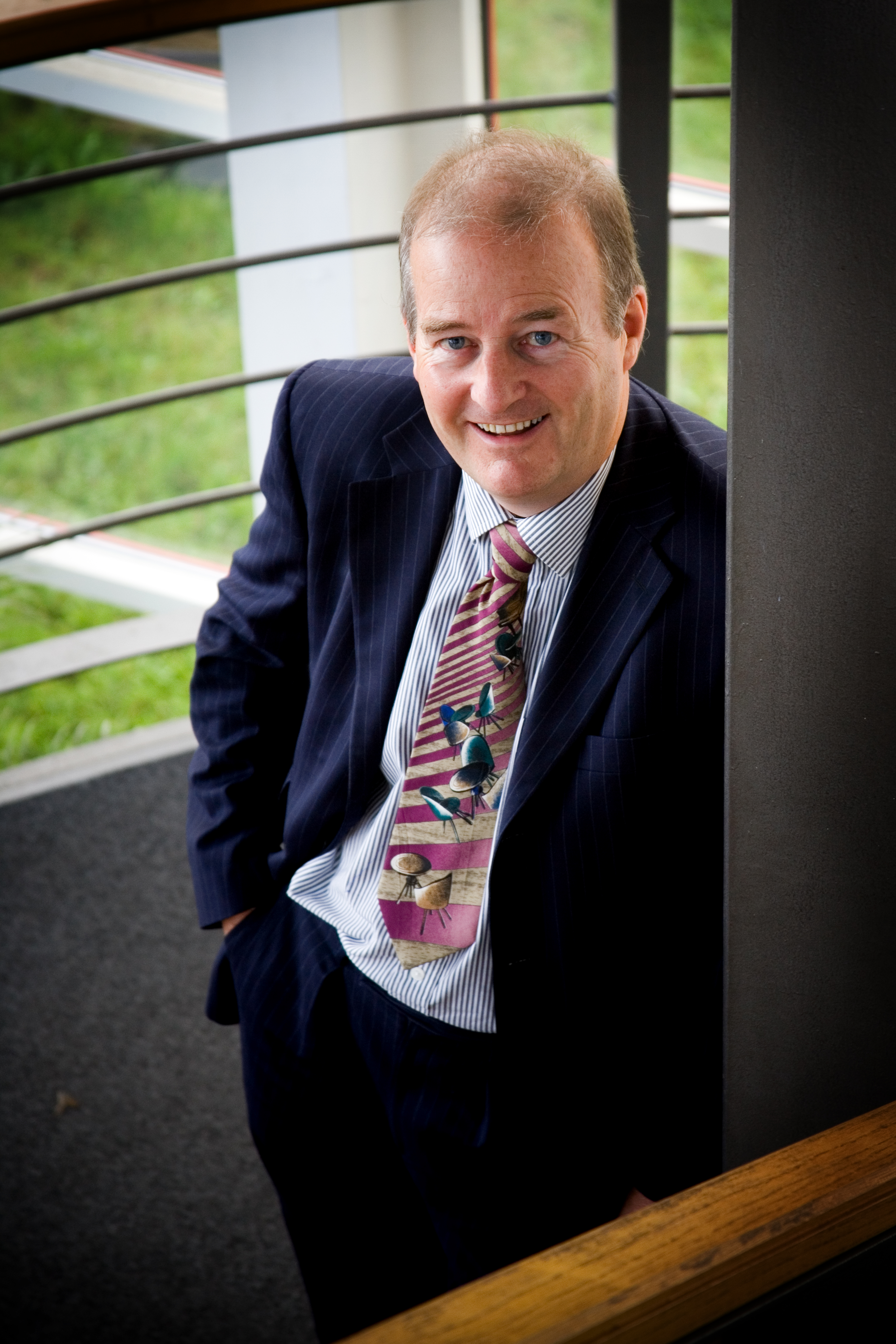
Bryn Davies, Principal of the college until 2013

- Glyn Sumption. 1959 – 1971
- Cynon Parry. 1971 – 1984
- Don Brooks. 1985 – 1997
- Bryn Davies. 1997 – 2013

== Campuses ==
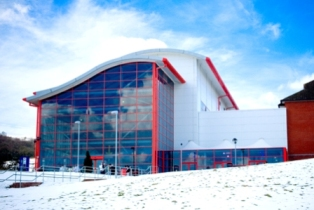
Ystrad Mynach Campus

The main campus is in Ystrad Mynach. Since 2001 The college has invested heavily in its estate.

- The college Rhymney – North of the Caerphilly County Borough and serves the top end of the Valley. Its aim is to develop the basic and intermediate skills of the area.
- The college @ Centres – Based in High Street locations in Aber Valley, Bargoed, Blackwood & Caerphilly, they provide ‘drop in’ training in IT in an informal environment.
- The college @ Tredomen – Located within the Tredomen Business & Technology Centre, provides training for both public sector and private sector companies delivering both "tailor made" and off the shelf courses. The college also runs a number of courses throughout the community in venues such as Community Centres and Schools.

== Scholars Restaurant ==
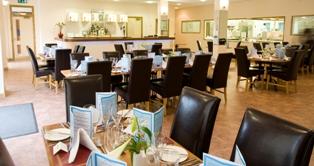
Scholars Restaurant

Scholars Restaurant at The College Ystrad Mynach opened in May 2007 by S4C TV Chef Dudley Newberry.

== Hair and Beauty Salons ==
Hair and Beauty Salons are situated in both the Ystrad Mynach and Rhymney campuses.
