= Mark Jones (footballer, born September 1961) =

English footballer

Personal information
- Full name: Mark Jones
- Date of birth: 26 September 1961 (age 65)
- Place of birth: Berinsfield, England
- Height: 5 ft 8 in (1.73 m)
- Position: Midfielder

Senior career*
Years	Team	Apps	(Gls)
1979–1986	Oxford United	129	(7)
1986–1990	Swindon Town	40	(9)
1990–1992	Cardiff City	36	(2)
- * Club domestic league appearances and goals

Mark Jones (born 26 September 1961) is an English former professional footballer. During his career, he made over 200 appearances in the Football League during spells with Oxford United, Swindon Town and Cardiff City.

== Career ==
Born in Berinsfield, Jones began his career with his hometown club Oxford United where he was part of the side that won consecutive promotions to help the side reach the First Division. He joined Swindon Town in October 1986 for £30,000, again winning promotion to the Second Division in his first season. However, persistent injury problems resulted in a move to Cardiff City in the Fourth Division but, struggling to overcome his injuries, he was eventually released in May 1992.

== Honours ==
Oxford United

- Football League Third Division: 1983–84
