= Les Berry (footballer) =

English footballer (born 1956)

Personal information
- Full name: Leslie Dennis Berry
- Date of birth: 4 May 1956 (age 70)
- Place of birth: Plumstead, London, England
- Height: 6 ft 2 in (1.88 m)
- Position: Central defender

Senior career*
| Years | Team | Apps | (Gls) |
| 1975–1986 | Charlton Athletic | 358 | (11) |
| 1986–1987 | Brighton & Hove Albion | 23 | (0) |
| 1987–1988 | Gillingham | 31 | (0) |
| 1988–1991 | Maidstone United | 63 | (2) |
| 1991–1992 | Welling United | 29 | (0) |
| Total | | 504 | (13) |
- * Club domestic league appearances and goals

Leslie Dennis Berry (born 4 May 1956) is an English former professional footballer. He played for Charlton Athletic, Brighton & Hove Albion, Gillingham and Maidstone United between 1972 and 1991, making over 450 appearances in the Football League.
