= Cohen Griffith =

Guyanese footballer (born 1962)

Personal information
- Date of birth: 26 December 1962 (age 63)
- Place of birth: Georgetown, British Guiana
- Position: Midfielder

Senior career*
Years	Team	Apps	(Gls)
1980–1982	Bath City	28	(14)
1983–1984	Wigston Fields		
1984–1985	Houghton Rangers		
1985–1988	Leicester United		
1988–1989	Kettering Town	44	(11)
1989–1995	Cardiff City	234	(39)
1995–1997	Barry Town	59	(16)
1997–1998	Weston-Super-Mare		
1998–2001	Merthyr Tydfil		
2001–2002	Rhayader Town	12	(1)

Managerial career
- 2008–2009: Troedyrhiw
- * Club domestic league appearances and goals

Cohen Griffith (born 26 December 1962) is a Guyanese former professional footballer who played as a midfielder.

== Playing career ==
Born in Georgetown, British Guiana, Griffith began his career at Kettering Town before moving to Cardiff City in October 1989 for £60,000 as a replacement for Jimmy Gilligan. He made his debut for the Bluebirds against Huddersfield Town and scored after just nineteen minutes. Mostly playing as a winger for Cardiff until he moved into a defensive midfield position later in his spell at the club. He eventually left the club in 1995 on a free transfer to Barry Town, helping the side to a treble in the 1996–97 season winning the Welsh Premier League, Welsh Cup and Welsh League Cup, including scoring both goals in the 2–1 Welsh Cup final win over Cwmbran Town.

== Coaching career ==
After his retirement Griffith moved into coaching and holds a UEFA B licence. He has worked in coaching schemes in the United Kingdom and Australia. He helps run a health and fitness suite at Ystrad Mynach College.

In February 2008 he took over as manager of Troedyrhiw but stepped down as manager in May 2009.

== Honours ==
Cardiff City

- Football League Third Division: 1992–93
