= Leigh Barnard =

English footballer

Personal information
- Full name: Leigh Kenneth Barnard
- Date of birth: 29 October 1958 (age 68)
- Place of birth: Eastbourne, England
- Height: 5 ft 8 in (1.73 m)
- Position: Midfielder

Senior career*
Years	Team	Apps	(Gls)
1977–1982	Portsmouth	79	(8)
1982	→ Peterborough United (loan)	4	(0)
1982–1989	Swindon Town	217	(21)
1985	→ Exeter City (loan)	6	(2)
1989–1991	Cardiff City	63	(8)
- * Club domestic league appearances and goals

Leigh Kenneth Barnard (born 29 October 1958) is an English former professional footballer who played as a midfielder. During his career, he made over 350 appearances in the Football League during spells with Portsmouth, Swindon Town and Cardiff City.

== Career ==
Barnard joined Portsmouth as an apprentice in 1977 and appeared in 79 games for the club before falling out of favour in 1982 and being loaned out to Peterborough United.

He was given a free transfer to Swindon Town at the end of the 1981–82 season with, then manager, John Trollope commenting "He has the kind of appetite for work that Roger Smart used to have in midfield, and you can't ask for more than that". Barnard was a regular first team choice in his first season with the Wiltshire club and played in every League game.

A left-sided midfielder, Barnard was loaned by Swindon to Exeter City during the 1984–85 season after showing poor form in a Football League Trophy match against Torquay United. In all he appeared 6 times for the Devon club, scoring twice, before returning to the Swindon first team the following season and scoring a goal against Mansfield Town that clinched the Fourth Division Championship for the team.

He lost his regular first team place in 1987–88 and did not appear in the first team again until the beginning of the 1989–90 season. A Fourth Division side on his arrival, Barnard made over 200 appearances for the club as they gained promotion twice during his spell the Robins, reaching the Second Division. He was eventually transferred to Cardiff City in October 1989 for £17,500 where he went on to appear 69 times, scoring 9 goals. After leaving Cardiff, Barnard later played non-league football for Stroud and Moreton Town. He also played in a trial match for Gloucester City against Bristol Rovers.

He taught Mathematics in Abbotsfield School for Boys until 4 April 2014.

== Honours ==
Swindon Town

- Football League Third Division play-offs: 1987
- Football League Fourth Division: 1985–86
