= Chris Pike =

Welsh footballer

Personal information
- Full name: Christopher Pike
- Date of birth: 19 October 1961 (age 65)
- Place of birth: Cardiff, Wales
- Height: 6 ft 2 in (1.88 m)
- Position: Striker

Senior career*
Years	Team	Apps	(Gls)
- Park Lawn
- Maesteg Park
198?–1985	Barry Town		
1985–1989	Fulham	42	(4)
1986	→ Cardiff City (loan)	6	(2)
1989–1993	Cardiff City	148	(55)
1993–1994	Hereford United	38	(18)
1994–1995	Gillingham	27	(13)
1995–1998	Barry Town	82	(46)
1998–1999	Cwmbran Town	29	(6)
1999	Bridgend Town		
1999–2000	Rhayader Town	14	(6)
2000	Llanelli	1	(0)
2000–2001	Rhayader Town	9	(2)
- * Club domestic league appearances and goals

Christopher Pike (born 19 October 1961) is a Welsh former professional footballer. His clubs included Fulham, Cardiff City and Gillingham. He made over 250 Football League appearances.

== Career ==
Pike began his career playing in the Cardiff Combination League with Park Lawn Football Club of Whitchurch, before moving up to the Welsh Football League with Maesteg Park and Barry Town. In 1985, he was given a chance in the Football League when he was signed by Fulham, managing to make an impact on the first team before an injury meant he lost his place in the side and, after finding himself unable to force his way back into the squad, was loaned out to his hometown side Cardiff City. He enjoyed a fairly successful spell at Cardiff but an injury crisis at Fulham saw him recalled.

In 1989, he returned to Cardiff City, this time on a permanent basis. At the club he established a striking partnership with Carl Dale and the two competed for the club's top scorer award at the club for several years, with Pike winning the award for three consecutive seasons between 1989 and 1992, the third season sharing it with Dale. He left the club in 1993 having played over 150 League games for the Bluebirds, to sign for Hereford United.

While playing for Hereford United in 1993 he scored a hat-trick against Colchester United, in which each of the three goals was scored past a different goalkeeper. He made 38 League appearances for Hereford and transferred to Gillingham in 1994-95, where he made his remaining 27 Football League appearances.

== Personal life ==
Pike is the uncle of Welsh international footballer Gareth Bale and the father of cricketer Oliver Pike.

== Honours ==
Cardiff City

- Football League Third Division: 1992–93
