= Allan Lewis (footballer) =

Welsh footballer

Personal information
- Full name: Allan Lewis
- Date of birth: 31 May 1971 (age 55)
- Place of birth: Aberdare, Wales
- Position: Defender

Senior career*
Years	Team	Apps	(Gls)
1987–1993	Cardiff City	106	(0)
- * Club domestic league appearances and goals

Allan Lewis (born 31 May 1971) is a Welsh former professional footballer who played as a defender. He made 106 appearances in the Football League for Cardiff City.

== Career ==
Lewis began his career with Cardiff City after joining the club on a YTS deal. He made his debut at 17 years of age but in his first season in the first team, Cardiff suffered relegation to the Fourth Division. In the following four years, Lewis was a regular in the first team, reaching 106 league appearances and played in the European Cup winners Cup and was in the successful double winning squad in 1992–93 season .
