= Neil Matthews (footballer, born 1967) =

English footballer

Personal information
- Full name: Neil Peter Matthews
- Date of birth: 3 December 1967 (age 58)
- Place of birth: Manchester, England
- Height: 6 ft 0 in (1.83 m)
- Position: Defender

Senior career*
Years	Team	Apps	(Gls)
1985–1990	Blackpool	76	(1)
1990–1993	Cardiff City	66	(2)
1992	→ Sogndal (loan)	15	(0)
1993–1995	Rochdale	19	(0)
1995–	Bulova SA (Hong Kong)		

International career
1989	Northern Ireland U23	1	(0)
1990	Northern Ireland U21	1	(0)
1995	Northern Ireland B	1	(0)
- * Club domestic league appearances and goals

Neil Peter Matthews (born 3 December 1967) is a former professional footballer. He began his career with Blackpool before moving to Cardiff City. He later finished his professional career with Rochdale where he became the club's first international representative at any level.

Although born in England, Matthews represented Northern Ireland at international level, winning single caps for the country's under-21, under-23 and B sides.

== Career ==
Matthews began his career as a youth player with Blackpool, where he also won caps for Northern Ireland at under-21 and under-23 levels. He made his professional debut for Blackpool as a teenager and went on to make over 75 appearances in all competitions for the club before leaving in 1990 following their relegation to the Fourth Division.

He instead joined Cardiff City, making his debut as a substitute during a 0–0 draw with Lincoln City on 15 August 1990. During his time at the club he became known for his versatility, playing in several different positions other than his normal defensive role. In May 1992, he moved to Norwegian side Sogndal on a six-month loan spell before returning to Cardiff where he was part of the side that achieved promotion from the Third Division and won the Welsh Cup after defeating Rhyl in the final.

He signed for Rochdale in 1993 and later became the club's first player to win an international cap at any level after representing the Northern Ireland B side in a match against Scotland B in 1995. His spell with the side was plagued with injuries and he made just nineteen league appearances during a two-year spell at Spotland Stadium.

== Honours ==
Cardiff City

- Football League Third Division: 1992–93
