= Roger Gibbins =

English footballer

Personal information
- Full name: Roger Graeme Gibbins
- Date of birth: 6 September 1955 (age 71)
- Place of birth: Enfield, England
- Height: 5 ft 10 in (1.78 m)
- Position: Midfielder

Senior career*
| Years | Team | Apps | (Gls) |
| 1972–1975 | Tottenham Hotspur | 0 | (0) |
| 1975–1976 | Oxford United | 19 | (2) |
| 1976–1978 | Norwich City | 48 | (12) |
| 1978–1979 | New England Tea Men | 49 | (8) |
| 1979–1982 | Cambridge United | 100 | (12) |
| 1982–1985 | Cardiff City | 139 | (17) |
| 1985–1986 | Swansea City | 35 | (6) |
| 1986–1988 | Newport County | 79 | (8) |
| 1988–1989 | Torquay United | 33 | (5) |
| 1989 | Newport County | | |
| 1989–1993 | Cardiff City | 142 | (7) |
| 1994–1998 | Cwmbrân Town | 101 | (11) |
| 1998–1999 | Weston-super-Mare | | |

Managerial career
- 2002–2003: Cwmbrân Town (interim)
- * Club domestic league appearances and goals

Roger Graeme Gibbins (born 6 September 1955) is an English former professional footballer. He represented England at Schools level.

== Playing career ==
Having represented Enfield, Middlesex and London at schools level, Gibbins began his career as an apprentice with Tottenham Hotspur, where his father Eddie had played in the early 1950s. Joining the club at the age of thirteen, he scored the winning goal for the club in the 1974 FA Youth Cup final against Huddersfield Town. He turned professional in December 1972. He spent a further two and a half seasons at White Hart Lane, but left in August 1975, to join Oxford United, without making his league debut. He stayed at the Manor Ground for only one season, before joining First Division Norwich City on a free transfer in June 1976. He gradually established himself at Norwich and started 1977–78 season as a regular in the Carrow Road side. He left Norwich in 1978 after 12 goals in 48 games, to play in the NASL for the New England Tea Men (costing £60,000). He returned on a permanent basis to English football in September 1979 when he joined Cambridge United.

He played 100 games for Cambridge, scoring 12 goals, before joining Cardiff City on a free transfer in August 1982. He helped Cardiff to promotion in his first season at Ninian Park, but left in October 1985 after scoring 17 goals in 139 appearances, joining local and Third Division rivals Swansea City in a swap deal involving Chris Marustik. The Swans were in freefall through the Football League and Gibbins left to join Newport County in August 1986, in effect going from one financially troubled club to another. Newport were relegated at the end of the following season, but worse was to come with the club in so much financial trouble that many of the players had to leave.

Gibbins stayed until March 1988 with Newport's relegation from the Football League almost confirmed, joining Torquay United on a free transfer having played 79 games and scored 8 goals for Newport. He was signed to aid Torquay's push for what would have been a surprising promotion given the turmoil and near relegation of the previous season, but in the end Torquay failed to secure automatic promotion and fell in the first leg of the play-offs. Midway through the following season, in January 1989, Gibbins returned to Newport County for £10,000, after scoring 5 times in 33 games for the Gulls. The most surprising aspect of this transfer was that Newport could afford a fee. They folded before the end of the season, their Conference record being expunged, and Gibbins moved back to Cardiff City in March 1989. He played a further 142 games for Cardiff, scoring 7 goals before ending his league career and joining the coaching staff at Ninian Park.

== Coaching career ==
He later worked as assistant manager at Merthyr Tydfil, working under Colin Addison. In August 1998 he was appointed player-coach of Weston-super-Mare, before leaving to manage Merthyr Tydfil in March 1999. However, just six weeks into the following season, he resigned from Merthyr when they changed the managerial post to a full-time job. At the same time he held the full-time post working on player education for the PFA and did not want to give this job up.

Gibbins later worked as coach of Cwmbran Town, taking up the role of assistant to Tony Wilcox in summer 1999. He took over the position of manager in December 2002 on a temporary basis due to the ill health of Wilcox, and after Wilcox's death in April 2003, Gibbins agreed to remain in the role until the end of the season. Under Gibbins, Cwmbran Town reached the final of the 2002–03 Welsh Cup, though were beaten in the final by Barry Town on a penalty shoot-out. He resigned from his role at Cwmbran Town in summer 2003, citing the emotional turmoil from Wilcox's death.
