= 1987–88 Cardiff City F.C. season =

Welsh football club season

Cardiff City
1987–88 season
- Chairman: Tony Clemo
- Manager: Frank Burrows
- Football League Fourth Division: 2nd
- FA Cup: 1st round
- League Cup: 1st round
- Welsh Cup: Winners
- Sherpa Van Trophy: 1st round
- Top goalscorer: League: Jimmy Gilligan (19); All: Jimmy Gilligan (25)
- Highest home attendance: 10,125 (v Crewe, 2 May 1988)
- Lowest home attendance: 2,201 (v Darlington, 15 September 1987)
- Average home league attendance: 4,849
Home colours

The 1987–88 season was Cardiff City F.C.'s 61st season in the Football League. They competed in the 24-team Division Four, then the fourth tier of English football, finishing second, winning promotion to Division Three.

== Players ==
First team squad. Note: Flags indicate national team as defined under FIFA eligibility rules; some limited exceptions apply. Players may hold more than one non-FIFA nationality.

Pos.	Nation	Player
GK	ENG	Scott Endersby
GK	ENG	Alan Judge
GK	ENG	Graham Moseley
GK	WAL	Jon Roberts
GK	SCO	George Wood
DF	WAL	Gareth Abraham
DF	WAL	Phil Bater
DF	WAL	Terry Boyle
DF	ENG	Mike Ford
DF	WAL	Jason Perry
DF	ENG	Nick Platnauer

Pos.	Nation	Player
MF	WAL	Jason Gummer
MF	ENG	Mark Kelly
MF	ENG	Steve Mardenborough
MF	ENG	Brian McDermott
MF	ENG	Paul Sanderson
MF	ENG	Paul Wheeler
MF	ENG	Paul Wimbleton
FW	ENG	Kevin Bartlett
FW	WAL	Alan Curtis
FW	ENG	Jimmy Gilligan
FW	WAL	Ian Walsh

== League standings ==
Pos	Team	Pld	W	D	L	GF	GA	GD	Pts	Promotion or relegation
1	Wolverhampton Wanderers (C, P)	46	27	9	10	82	43	+39	90	Promotion to the Third Division
2	Cardiff City (P)	46	24	13	9	66	41	+25	85	Cup Winners' Cup first round and promotion to the Third Division
3	Bolton Wanderers (P)	46	22	12	12	66	42	+24	78	Promotion to the Third Division
4	Scunthorpe United	46	20	17	9	76	51	+25	77	Qualification for the Fourth Division play-offs
5	Torquay United	46	21	14	11	66	41	+25	77	Qualification for the Fourth Division play-offs

(C) Champions; (P) Promoted

=== Results by round ===
Round	1	2	3	4	5	6	7	8	9	10	11	12	13	14	15	16	17	18	19	20	21	22	23	24	25	26	27	28	29	30	31	32	33	34	35	36	37	38	39	40	41	42	43	44	45	46
Ground	H	A	H	A	H	A	H	H	A	H	A	H	A	H	A	H	A	H	A	H	A	H	H	A	A	A	H	A	A	H	A	H	A	H	A	H	H	A	A	H	A	H	H	A	H	A
Result	D	L	W	D	W	L	W	W	W	D	W	L	L	W	L	W	D	W	W	D	D	W	W	L	D	D	W	D	W	W	L	D	W	D	W	D	L	D	W	W	L	W	W	W	W	W
Position		19	13	16	10	15	10	7	2	4	1	4	9	6	10	7	8	5	2	2	4	4	3	4	4	5	3	3	2	2	2	2	2	2	2	2	3	2	2	2	2	2	2	2	2	2
Points	1	1	4	5	8	8	11	14	17	18	21	21	21	24	24	27	28	31	34	35	36	39	42	42	43	44	47	48	51	54	54	55	58	59	62	63	63	64	67	70	70	73	76	79	82	85

A = Away; H = Home; W = Win; D = Draw; L = Loss

== Fixtures and results ==
=== Fourth Division ===
15 August 1987 1	Cardiff City	1–1	Leyton Orient	Cardiff
15:00	Jimmy Gilligan 45'		45' Mark Smalley	Stadium: Ninian Park; Attendance: 3,357; Referee: R Hamer (Bristol)

22 August 1987 2	Bolton Wanderers	1–0	Cardiff City	Bolton
15:00	Jeff Chandler 37'			Stadium: Burnden Park; Attendance: 4,530; Referee: J Kirby (Sheffield)

29 August 1987 3	Cardiff City	1–0	Swansea City	Cardiff
15:00	Jimmy Gilligan 53'			Stadium: Ninian Park; Attendance: 6,010; Referee: John Carter (Christchurch, Dorset)

1 September 1987 4	Cambridge United	0–0	Cardiff City	Cambridge
19:45				Stadium: Abbey Stadium; Attendance: 2,079; Referee: John Key (Rotherham)

5 September 1987 5	Cardiff City	3–2	Wolverhampton Wanderers	Cardiff
15:00	Brian McDermott 2'; Kevin Bartlett 72'; Terry Boyle 81'		35' Nigel Vaughan; 54' Steve Bull	Stadium: Ninian Park; Attendance: 2,258; Referee: Darryl Reeves (Uxbridge)

12 September 1987 6	Wrexham	3–0	Cardiff City	Wrexham
15:00	Steve Buxton 51'; Geoff Hunter 59'; Kevin Russell 88'	Wrexham report		Stadium: The Racecourse; Attendance: 2,212; Referee: E Parker (Preston)

15 September 1987 7	Cardiff City	3–1	Darlington	Cardiff
19:45	Gareth Abraham 18'; Kevin Bartlett 48'; Kevin Bartlett 51'		54' Stephen Bell	Stadium: Ninian Park; Attendance: 2,201; Referee: Noel Butler (Surrey)

19 September 1987 8	Cardiff City	4–2	Carlisle United	Cardiff
15:00	Jimmy Gilligan 29'; Mike Ford 55'; Terry Boyle 63'; Jimmy Gilligan 78'		31' Brent Hetherington; 40' Wes Saunders	Stadium: Ninian Park; Attendance: 2,659; Referee: Paul Durkin (Dorset)

25 September 1987 9	Tranmere Rovers	0–1	Cardiff City	Birkenhead
19:30			47' Paul Wimbleton	Stadium: Prenton Park; Attendance: 2,543; Referee: Paul Danson (Leicester)

29 September 1987 10	Cardiff City	0–0	Halifax Town	Cardiff
19:45				Stadium: Ninian Park; Attendance: 3,666; Referee: Gerald Ashby (Worcester)

2 October 1987 11	Stockport County	0–1	Cardiff City	Stockport
19:30			16' Kevin Bartlett	Stadium: Edgeley Park; Attendance: 2,332; Referee: T Simpson (Sowerby Bridge)

10 October 1987 12	Cardiff City	0–1	Hereford United	Cardiff
15:00	Alan Curtis (red card)		69' (pen.) Steve Spooner	Stadium: Ninian Park; Attendance: 4,420; Referee: Tony Ward (London)

17 October 1987 13	Peterborough United	4–3	Cardiff City	Peterborough
15:00	Mick Gooding 25'; Les Lawrence 50'; Noel Luke 56'; Noel Luke 78'		14' Mike Ford; 41' Mike Ford; 55' Brian McDermott	Stadium: London Road; Attendance: 3,473; Referee: Jim Borrett (Harleston)

20 October 1987 14	Cardiff City	2–1	Torquay United	Cardiff
19:45	Mike Ford 60'; Jimmy Gilligan 72'		38' Derek Dawkins	Stadium: Ninian Park; Attendance: 3,503; Referee: Peter Wright (Northwich)

24 October 1987 15	Scunthorpe United	2–1	Cardiff City	Scunthorpe
15:00	Mike Ford 5' (o.g.); Kevin Taylor 23'		81' Paul Sanderson	Stadium: Old Show Ground; Attendance: 2,872; Referee: Paul Harrison (Rochdale)

31 October 1987 16	Cardiff City	1–0	Rochdale	Cardiff
15:00	Jimmy Gilligan 90'			Stadium: Ninian Park; Attendance: 3,046; Referee: Colin Downey (Hounslow)

4 November 1987 17	Scarborough	1–1	Cardiff City	Scarborough, North Yorkshire
	Stewart Mell 42'		44' Paul Wimbleton	Stadium: Athletic Ground; Attendance: 2,599; Referee: D Scott (Burnley)

7 November 1987 18	Cardiff City	3–2	Exeter City	Cardiff
15:00	Jimmy Gilligan 4'; Jimmy Gilligan 83'; Terry Boyle 77'		15' Darren Rowbotham; 62' Paul Batty	Stadium: Ninian Park; Attendance: 3,474; Referee: Terry Holbrook (Walsall)

21 November 1987 19	Newport County	1–2	Cardiff City	Newport
15:00	Paul Miller 57'		69' Paul Wimbleton; 74' Nick Platnauer	Stadium: Somerton Park; Attendance: 4,022; Referee: M James (Horsham)

28 November 1987 20	Cardiff City	1–1	Hartlepool United	Cardiff
15:00	Brian McDermott 88'		14' Tony Barratt	Stadium: Ninian Park; Attendance: 3,232; Referee: K Miller (Harlow)

12 December 1987 21	Crewe Alexandra	0–0	Cardiff City	Crewe
15:00				Stadium: Gresty Road; Attendance: 2,010; Referee: Ken Lupton (Stockton)

19 December 1987 22	Cardiff City	2–1	Burnley	Cardiff
15:00	Jimmy Gilligan 79'; Jimmy Gilligan 81'		47' Steve Davis	Stadium: Ninian Park; Attendance: 3,401; Referee: John Moules (Kent)

26 December 1987 23	Cardiff City	3–0	Tranmere Rovers	Cardiff
15:00	Jimmy Gilligan 24'; Jimmy Gilligan 83'; Paul Wimbleton 69'			Stadium: Ninian Park; Attendance: 5,233; Referee: Ron Groves (Weston)

28 December 1987 24	Colchester United	2–1	Cardiff City	Colchester
19:30	Dale Tempest 40'; Tony English 75'		24' Mark Kelly	Stadium: Layer Road; Attendance: 2,599; Referee: Philip Don (Middlesex)

1 January 1988 25	Swansea City	2–2	Cardiff City	Swansea City
11:30	Joe Allon 60'; Paul Raynor 87'		84' Mike Ford; 90' Jimmy Gilligan	Stadium: Vetch Field; Attendance: 10,360; Referee: Roger Milford (Bristol)

16 January 1988 26	Carlisle United	0–0	Cardiff City	Carlisle
15:00				Stadium: Brunton Park; Attendance: 2,344; Referee: Ian Hendrick (Preston)

30 January 1988 27	Cardiff City	4–0	Cambridge United	Cardiff
15:00	Paul Wimbleton 4' (pen.); Kevin Bartlett 30'; Brian McDermott 40'; Terry Boyle 66'			Stadium: Ninian Park; Attendance: 4,012; Referee: Vic Callow (Solihull)

2 February 1988 28	Darlington	0–0	Cardiff City	Darlington
15:00				Stadium: Feethams; Attendance: 2,332; Referee: Colin Trussell (Liverpool)

6 February 1988 29	Wolverhampton Wanderers	1–4	Cardiff City	Wolverhampton
15:00	Steve Bull 72'		64' Jimmy Gilligan; 82' Jimmy Gilligan; 67' Paul Wimbleton; 88' Paul Wimbleton	Stadium: Molineux; Attendance: 9,072; Referee: F Roberts (Prestatyn)

13 February 1988 30	Cardiff City	1–0	Colchester United	Cardiff
15:00	Mike Ford 49'			Stadium: Ninian Park; Attendance: 5,458; Referee: David Hutchinson (Cambridge)

20 February 1988 31	Leyton Orient	4–1	Cardiff City	London
15:00	Kevin Hales 40' (pen.); Steve Castle 51'; Terry Howard 84'; Ian Juryeff 87'		15' Kevin Bartlett	Stadium: Brisbane Road; Attendance: 3,523; Referee: M Bailey (Impington)

27 February 1988 32	Cardiff City	0–0	Stockport County	Cardiff
15:00				Stadium: Ninian Park; Attendance: 4,008; Referee: Jim Rushton (Stoke)

1 March 1988 33	Halifax Town	0–1	Cardiff City	Halifax
19:30			73' Kevin Bartlett	Stadium: The Shay; Attendance: 1,128; Referee: Kevin Breen (Liverpool)

4 March 1988 34	Cardiff City	0–0	Peterborough United	Cardiff
19:45				Stadium: Ninian Park; Attendance: 4,172; Referee: Lester Shapter (Paignton)

13 March 1988 35	Hereford United	1–2	Cardiff City	Hereford
12:00	Phil Stant 2'		3' Jimmy Gilligan; 82' Kevin Bartlett	Stadium: Edgar Street; Attendance: 3,210; Referee: Paul Vanes (West Midlands)

16 March 1988 36	Cardiff City	1–1	Wrexham	Cardiff
19:45	Jimmy Gilligan 69'	Wrexham report	27' Roger Preece	Stadium: Ninian Park; Attendance: 4,083; Referee: Gerald Ashby (Worcester)

26 March 1988 37	Cardiff City	0–1	Scunthorpe United	Cardiff
15:00			80' David Shearer	Stadium: Ninian Park; Attendance: 4,527; Referee: Martin Bodenham (East Looe)

29 March 1988 38	Rochdale	2–2	Cardiff City	Rochdale
	Carl Harris 42'; Lyndon Simmonds 70' (pen.)		57' Kevin Bartlett; 78' (o.g.) John Bramhall	Stadium: Spotland; Attendance: 1,435; Referee: Howard Taylor

2 April 1988 39	Exeter City	0–2	Cardiff City	Exeter
15:00			30' Kevin Bartlett; 41' Kevin Bartlett	Stadium: St James Park; Attendance: 2,649; Referee: Mike Reed (Birmingham)

4 April 1988 40	Cardiff City	4–0	Newport County	Cardiff
11:30	Nigel Stevenson 37'; Paul Wimbleton 66'; Brian McDermott 71'; Mike Ford 76'			Stadium: Ninian Park; Attendance: 6,536; Referee: Vic Callow (Solihull)

9 April 1988 41	Torquay United	2–0	Cardiff City	Torquay
15:00	Lee Sharpe 30' (pen.); Jim McNichol 37'			Stadium: Plainmoor; Attendance: 3,082; Referee: R Hamer (Bristol)

15 April 1988 42	Cardiff City	1–0	Bolton Wanderers	Cardiff
19:45	Jimmy Gilligan 74'			Stadium: Ninian Park; Attendance: 6,705; Referee: John Martin (Alton, Hampshire)

23 April 1988 43	Cardiff City	2–0	Scarborough	Cardiff
15:00	Alan Curtis 10'; Brian McDermott 50' (pen.)			Stadium: Ninian Park; Attendance: 5,751; Referee: Jim Ashworth (Luffenham)

30 April 1988 44	Hartlepool United	0–1	Cardiff City	Hartlepool
15:00			30' Jimmy Gilligan	Stadium: Victoria Park; Attendance: 1,097; Referee: Howard Taylor (Oadby, Leicestershire)

2 May 1988 45	Cardiff City	2–0	Crewe Alexandra	Cardiff
15:00	Kevin Bartlett 13'; Brian McDermott 45'			Stadium: Ninian Park; Attendance: 10,125; Referee: Danny Vickers (Essex)

7 May 1988 46	Burnley	1–2	Cardiff City	Burnley
15:00	George Oghani 84'		72' Alan Curtis; 89' Jimmy Gilligan	Stadium: Turf Moor; Attendance: 8,525; Referee: John Ireland

=== Littlewoods Challenge Cup (League Cup) ===
18 August 1987 Round 1 (First Leg)	Newport County	2–1	Cardiff City	Cardiff
19:30	Paul Evans 40', 74'		56' Alan Curtis	Stadium: Ninian Park; Attendance: 3,383; Referee: Ray Lewis (Great Bookham, Surrey)
Note: Newport conceded home advantage and game was played at Ninian Park.

25 August 1987 Round 1 (Second Leg)	Cardiff City	2–2 (3–4 agg.)	Newport County	Cardiff
19:45	Jimmy Gilligan 6'; Paul Sanderson 37'		11' Robbie Taylor; 48' Steve Tupling	Stadium: Ninian Park; Attendance: 3,550; Referee: Lester Shapter (Paignton)

=== FA Cup ===
14 November 1987 Round 1	Peterborough United	2–1	Cardiff City	Peterborough
15:00	Mick Gooding 17'; Mick Gooding 56'		44' Kevin Bartlett	Stadium: London Road; Attendance: 3,600; Referee: Vic Callow (Solihull)

=== Welsh Cup ===
18 November 1987 Round 3	Ebbw Vale	0–0	Cardiff City	Cardiff
19:45				Stadium: Ninian Park; Attendance: 935; Referee: J Williams (Magor)
Note: Ebbw Vale conceded home advantage

5 December 1987 Round 3 (Replay)	Cardiff City	1–0	Ebbw Vale	Cardiff
15:00	Kevin Bartlett 4'			Stadium: Ninian Park; Attendance: 975; Referee: J Williams (Magor)

9 January 1988 Round 4	Cardiff City	3–1	Port Talbot Town	Cardiff
15:00	Mike Ford 20', 44'; Jimmy Gilligan 65'		87' D John	Stadium: Ninian Park; Attendance: 1,382; Referee: R Thomas (Ton Pentre)

24 February 1988 Round 5	Cardiff City	3–1	Merthyr Tydfil	Cardiff
19:45	Jimmy Gilligan 9'; Paul Wimbleton 46'; Paul Wimbleton 67'		87' Dai Webley	Stadium: Ninian Park; Attendance: 7,213; Referee: Roger Gifford (Llanbradach)

19 April 1988 Semi Final (First Leg)	Cardiff City	2–1	Caernarfon Town	Cardiff
19:45	Paul Wimbleton 15' (pen.); Mark Kelly 42'		35' Damian Looker	Stadium: Ninian Park; Attendance: 2,750; Referee: W Burge (Tonypandy)

27 April 1988 Semi Final (Second Leg)	Caernarfon Town	0–1 (1–3 agg.)	Cardiff City	Caernarfon
19:30			78' (pen.) Brian McDermott	Stadium: The Oval; Attendance: 3,000; Referee: Ron Bridges (Deeside)

17 May 1988 Final	Wrexham	0–2	Cardiff City	Swansea
19:30		Wrexham report	13' Alan Curtis; 34' Jimmy Gilligan	Stadium: Vetch Field; Attendance: 5,645; Referee: Roger Gifford (Llanbradach)

=== Sherpa Van Trophy ===
13 October 1987 Preliminary Round	Cardiff City	3–2	Wrexham	Cardiff
19:45	Paul Wheeler 35'; Brian McDermott 52'; Jimmy Gilligan 70'	Wrexham report	43' Darren Wright; 74' Shaun Cunnington	Stadium: Ninian Park; Attendance: 1,102; Referee: Paul Vanes (West Midlands)

24 November 1987 Preliminary Round	Walsall	3–1	Cardiff City	Walsall
19:30	David Kelly 10'; Nicky Cross 60'; Phil Hawker 66'		25' Jimmy Gilligan	Stadium: Fellows Park; Attendance: 2,420; Referee: N Butler (Surrey)

20 January 1988 Round 1	Notts County	2–0	Cardiff City	Nottingham
19:30	Paul Barnes 14'; Ian McParland 85'			Stadium: Meadow Lane; Attendance: 2,704; Referee: Tony Ward (London)

== See also ==
- List of Cardiff City F.C. seasons

== Bibliography ==
- Hayes, Dean (2006). The Who's Who of Cardiff City. Breedon Books. ISBN 1-85983-462-0.
- Crooks, John (1986). Cardiff City Chronology 1920-86. John Crooks. ISBN 0-9511984-0-8.
- Shepherd, Richard (2002). The Definitive Cardiff City F.C. Tony Brown. ISBN 1-899-46817-X.
- Crooks, John (1992). Cardiff City Football Club: Official History of the Bluebirds. Yore Publications. ISBN 0-9513321-8-X.
- Rollin, Jack, ed. (1988). Rothmans Football Yearbook 1988-89. Queen Anne Press. ISBN 0-356-15879-9.
- Crooks, John (1988). Cardiff City Diary of a Double Season 1987-88. John Crooks. ISBN 0-9511984-2-4.
- "Football Club History Database – Cardiff City". Archived from the original on 30 December 2008.
- Welsh Football Data Archive
