= 1988–89 Cardiff City F.C. season =

Welsh football club season

Cardiff City
1988–89 season
- Chairman: Tony Clemo
- Manager: Frank Burrows
- Football League Third Division: 16th
- FA Cup: 3rd round
- League Cup: 2nd round
- European Cup Winners Cup: 2nd round
- Welsh Cup: 5th round
- Sherpa Van Trophy: 1st round
- Top goalscorer: League: Jimmy Gilligan (14); All: Jimmy Gilligan (23)
- Highest home attendance: 10,675 (v Swansea, 26 December 1988)
- Lowest home attendance: 2,411 (v Bury, 1 November 1988)
- Average home league attendance: 4,782

The 1988–89 season was Cardiff City F.C.'s 62nd season in the Football League. They competed in the 24-team Division Three, then the third tier of English football, finishing sixteenth.

== Players ==
First team squad. Note: Flags indicate national team as defined under FIFA eligibility rules; some limited exceptions apply. Players may hold more than one non-FIFA nationality.

Pos.	Nation	Player
GK	WAL	Jon Roberts
GK	SCO	George Wood
DF	WAL	Gareth Abraham
DF	WAL	Phil Bater
DF	WAL	Terry Boyle
DF	WAL	Allan Lewis
DF	WAL	Jason Perry
DF	ENG	Nick Platnauer
DF	ENG	Ian Rodgerson
DF	WAL	Nigel Stevenson
MF	WAL	Chris Fry
MF	ENG	Roger Gibbins
MF	WAL	Jason Gummer
MF	ENG	Matty Holmes

Pos.	Nation	Player
MF	ENG	Mark Kelly
MF	ENG	Steve Ketteridge
MF	ENG	Steve Lynex
MF	ENG	Brian McDermott
MF	WAL	Jon Morgan
MF	ENG	Steve Tupling
MF	ENG	Paul Wheeler
MF	ENG	Paul Wimbleton
FW	ENG	Kevin Bartlett
FW	WAL	Alan Curtis
FW	ENG	Jimmy Gilligan
FW	WAL	Richard Haig
FW	WAL	Ian Walsh

== League standings ==
Pos	Team	Pld	W	D	L	GF	GA	GD	Pts
14	Huddersfield Town	46	17	9	20	63	73	−10	60
15	Mansfield Town	46	14	17	15	48	52	−4	59
16	Cardiff City	46	14	15	17	44	56	−12	57
17	Wigan Athletic	46	14	14	18	55	53	+2	56
18	Reading	46	15	11	20	68	72	−4	56

=== Results by round ===
Round	1	2	3	4	5	6	7	8	9	10	11	12	13	14	15	16	17	18	19	20	21	22	23	24	25	26	27	28	29	30	31	32	33	34	35	36	37	38	39	40	41	42	43	44	45	46
Ground	H	A	H	A	A	H	H	A	A	A	H	H	H	H	A	A	H	H	A	A	H	A	H	A	H	A	A	H	A	A	A	H	A	H	H	A	A	A	H	H	A	H	H	H	A	H
Result	L	L	W	L	D	D	L	D	D	L	W	W	W	W	D	L	D	D	W	L	W	L	W	W	D	L	L	D	W	L	L	W	D	D	D	L	W	L	L	W	L	L	D	W	D	D
Position		24	17	20	22	22	23	22	22	21	21	20	17	17	17	18	18	19	16	17	16	17	17	13	14	16	18	18	16	18	18	17	18	18	18	18	17	17	17	17	18	18	18	16	16	15
Points	0	0	3	3	4	5	5	6	7	7	10	13	16	19	20	20	21	22	25	25	28	28	31	34	35	35	35	36	39	39	39	42	43	44	45	45	48	48	48	51	51	51	52	55	56	57

A = Away; H = Home; W = Win; D = Draw; L = Loss

== Fixtures and results ==
=== Third Division ===
27 August 1988 1	Cardiff City	1–2	Fulham	Cardiff
15:00	Ian Walsh		Andy Sayer; Gary Elkins	Stadium: Ninian Park; Attendance: 6,024c Referee: Martin Bodenham (East Looe)

3 September 1988 2	Bolton Wanderers	4–0	Cardiff City	Bolton
15:00	John Thomas; Gary Henshaw; Julian Darby; Julian Darby			Stadium: Burnden Park; Attendance: 4,831; Referee: Paul Danson (Leicester)

10 September 1988 3	Cardiff City	3–0	Huddersfield Town	Cardiff
15:00	Nigel Stevenson; Ian Walsh; Ian Walsh			Stadium: Ninian Park; Attendance: 3,891; Referee: Mike Reed (Birmingham)

17 September 1988 4	Port Vale	6–1	Cardiff City	Stoke on Trent
	Ron Futcher; Ron Futcher; Darren Beckford; David Riley; Robbie Earle; Ray Walker		Jimmy Gilligan	Stadium: Vale Park; Attendance: 4,280

23 September 1988 5	Southend United	0–0	Cardiff City	Southend
				Stadium: Roots Hall; Attendance: 3,199

1 October 1988 6	Cardiff City	2–2	Bristol Rovers	Cardiff
15:00	Jimmy Gilligan 82'; Kevin Bartlett 85'		5' Gary Penrice; 38' Ian Holloway	Stadium: Ninian Park; Attendance: 5,038

8 October 1988 7	Cardiff City	1–2	Reading	Cardiff
15:00	Alan Curtis 43'		Mike Conroy; Michael Gilkes	Stadium: Ninian Park; Attendance: 4,057

15 October 1988 8	Chester City	0–0	Cardiff City	Chester
15:00				Stadium: Sealand Road; Attendance: 2,796

22 October 1988 9	Mansfield Town	2–2	Cardiff City	Mansfield
15:00	Keith Cassells; Keith Cassells		Steve Ketteridge; 48' Brian McDermott	Stadium: Field Mill; Attendance: 3,566; Referee: PK Pawley (Cambridge)

29 October 1988 10	Blackpool	1–0	Cardiff City	Blackpool
15:00	Andy Garner			Stadium: Bloomfield Road; Attendance: 3,843

1 November 1988 11	Cardiff City	3–0	Bury	Cardiff
19:45	Jimmy Gilligan 57'; Kevin Bartlett; Steve Ketteridge			Stadium: Ninian Park; Attendance: 2,411

5 November 1988 12	Cardiff City	1–0	Gillingham	Cardiff
15:00	Kevin Bartlett 56'	Gillingham report		Stadium: Ninian Park; Attendance: 3,658; Referee: Paul Durkin (Dorset)

12 November 1988 13	Cardiff City	1–0	Northampton Town	Cardiff
15:00	Kevin Bartlett 9'			Stadium: Ninian Park; Attendance: 3,280; Referee: Ffrangcon Roberts (Prestatyn)

25 November 1988 14	Cardiff City	1–0	Brentford	Cardiff
19:45	Jimmy Gilligan 27'			Stadium: Ninian Park; Attendance: 3,405

3 December 1988 15	Preston North End	3–3	Cardiff City	Preston
15:00	Gary Brazil 3'; Tony Ellis 39'; Tony Ellis 63'		51' Jimmy Gilligan; 62' Kevin Bartlett; 80' Kevin Bartlett	Stadium: Deepdale; Attendance: 4,926

17 December 1988 16	Bristol City	2–0	Cardiff City	Bristol
15:00	Rob Newman 4'; Nigel Hawkins			Stadium: Ashton Gate; Attendance: 7,493

26 December 1988 17	Cardiff City	2–2	Swansea City	Cardiff
12:00	Jimmy Gilligan 5', 12'		15' David Puckett; 59' Alan Davies	Stadium: Ninian Park; Attendance: 10,675; Referee: Brian Stevens (Stonehouse)

30 December 1988 18	Cardiff City	2–2	Wigan Athletic	Cardiff
19:45	Kevin Bartlett 79'; Alan Curtis 75'		Wayne Entwistle; Bryan Griffiths	Stadium: Ninian Park; Attendance: 4,621; Referee: Ron Bridges (Deeside)

2 January 1989 19	Aldershot	0–1	Cardiff City	Aldershot
15:00			81' Alan Curtis	Stadium: Recreation Ground; Attendance: 2,768; Referee: Allan Gunn (Burgess Hill)

10 January 1989 20	Wolverhampton Wanderers	2–0	Cardiff City	Wolverhampton
19:30	Andy Mutch 10'; Steve Bull 34'			Stadium: Molineux; Attendance: 14,870; Referee: Alan Simmons (Cheadle Hume)

14 January 1989 21	Cardiff City	1–0	Bolton Wanderers	Cardiff
15:00	Kevin Bartlett 58'			Stadium: Ninian Park; Attendance: 4,212; Referee: Dennis Hedges (Oxford)

21 January 1989 22	Huddersfield Town	1–0	Cardiff City	Huddersfield
15:00	Junior Bent			Stadium: Leeds Road; Attendance: 4,869

28 January 1989 23	Cardiff City	3–0	Port Vale	Cardiff
15:00	Jimmy Gilligan 45'; Jimmy Gilligan 49'; Kevin Bartlett 47'			Stadium: Ninian Park; Attendance: 4,507; Referee: Roger Wiseman (Borehamwood)

4 February 1989 24	Bristol Rovers	0–1	Cardiff City	Bath, Somerset
15:00			69' Jimmy Gilligan	Stadium: Twerton Park; Attendance: 5,813; Referee: KJ Breen

11 February 1989 25	Cardiff City	0–0	Sheffield United	Cardiff
15:00				Stadium: Ninian Park; Attendance: 5,772; Referee: Paul Danson (Leicester)

18 February 1989 26	Reading	3–1	Cardiff City	Reading
15:00	Michael Gilkes 26'; Steve Moran 40'; Trevor Senior 86'		77' Ian Walsh	Stadium: Elm Park; Attendance: 4,359

28 February 1989 27	Notts County	2–0	Cardiff City	Nottingham
19:30	David Kevan; Chris Withe			Stadium: Meadow Lane; Attendance: 4,266

4 March 1989 28	Cardiff City	0–0	Mansfield Town	Cardiff
15:00				Stadium: Ninian Park; Attendance: 3,217; Referee: Ian Hemley (Ampthill)

11 March 1989 29	Gillingham	1–2	Cardiff City	Gillingham
15:00	Terry Boyle 90' (o.g.)	Gillingham report	17' Terry Boyle; 34' Nick Platnauer	Stadium: Priestfield Stadium; Attendance: 2,927; Referee: Roger Milford (Bristol)

18 March 1989 30	Fulham	2–0	Cardiff City	London
15:00	John Marshall 10'; Justin Skinner 77'			Stadium: Craven Cottage; Attendance: 4,261; Referee: IJ Borrett

21 March 1989 31	Chesterfield	4–0	Cardiff City	Chesterfield
19:30	Andy Morris 3'; Andy Morris 30'; Andy Morris 68'; Bob Bloomer 87' (pen.)			Stadium: Saltergate; Attendance: 2,888; Referee: J Ashworth

25 March 1989 32	Cardiff City	3–2	Aldershot	Cardiff
15:00	Jimmy Gilligan 11' (pen.); Paul Wheeler 53'; Alan Curtis 63'		24' (pen.) David Puckett; 71' Ian McDonald	Stadium: Ninian Park; Attendance: 3,251; Referee: John Key (Rotherham)

27 March 1989 33	Swansea City	1–1	Cardiff City	Swansea
12:00	Paul Raynor 51'		6' Jimmy Gilligan	Stadium: Vetch Field; Attendance: 9,201; Referee: Paul Durkin

1 April 1989 34	Cardiff City	1–1	Bristol City	Cardiff
15:00	Nick Platnauer		79' Bob Taylor	Stadium: Ninian Park; Attendance: 6,152

4 April 1989 35	Cardiff City	1–1	Wolverhampton Wanderers	Cardiff
19:45	Nick Platnauer		18' (pen.) Andy Thompson	Stadium: Ninian Park; Attendance: 7,219; Referee: Keith Cooper (Swindon)

7 April 1989 36	Wigan Athletic	1–0	Cardiff City	Wigan
19:30	Craig Ramage 57'			Stadium: Springfield Park (Wigan); Attendance: 2,083; Referee: Vic Callow (Solihull)

11 April 1989 37	Sheffield United	0–1	Cardiff City	Sheffield
19:30			Gareth Abraham	Stadium: Bramall Lane; Attendance: 11,618; Referee: Robbie Hart (Darlington)

15 April 1989 38	Bury	1–0	Cardiff City	Bury
15:00	Steve Elliott			Stadium: Gigg Lane; Attendance: 2,124

18 April 1989 39	Cardiff City	0–1	Notts County	Cardiff
19:45			6' Dean Yates	Stadium: Ninian Park; Attendance: 3,079

22 April 1989 40	Cardiff City	2–0	Southend United	Cardiff
15:06	Gareth Abraham; Jimmy Gilligan			Stadium: Ninian Park; Attendance: 3,268; Referee: Ian Hendrick (Preston)

29 April 1989 41	Northampton Town	3–0	Cardiff City	Northampton
15:00	Dean Thomas; Dean Thomas; Steve Berry			Stadium: County Ground; Attendance: 3,194; Referee: John Kirby

1 May 1989 42	Cardiff City	0–1	Chesterfield	Cardiff
15:00			Dave Waller	Stadium: Ninian Park; Attendance: 3,244; Referee: John Martin (Alton, Hampshire)

5 May 1989 43	Cardiff City	0–0	Preston North End	Cardiff
19:45				Stadium: Ninian Park; Attendance: 3,196

9 May 1989 44	Cardiff City	2–0	Chester City	Cardiff
19:45	Terry Boyle 59'; Jimmy Gilligan 77'			Stadium: Ninian Park; Attendance: 3,002; Referee: Lester Shapter (Paignton)

13 May 1989 45	Brentford	1–1	Cardiff City	Brentford
15:00	Terry Evans 61'		Jason Gummer	Stadium: Griffin Park; Attendance: 4,865; Referee: Paul Vanes (West Midlands)

16 May 1989 46	Cardiff City	0–0	Blackpool	Cardiff
19:45				Stadium: Ninian Park; Attendance: 3,246

=== League Cup ===
30 August 1988 Round 1 (1st Leg)	Cardiff City	0–1	Swansea City	Cardiff
19:45			Steve Thornber	Stadium: Ninian Park; Attendance: 6,241; Referee: Keith Burge (Tonypandy)

20 September 1988 Round 1 (2nd Leg)	Swansea City	0–2 (1–2 agg.)	Cardiff City	Swansea
19:30			77' Paul Wheeler; 80' Terry Boyle	Stadium: Vetch Field; Attendance: 6,987

28 September 1988 Round 2 (1st leg)	Queens Park Rangers	3–0	Cardiff City	London
19:45	Trevor Francis 12'; Wayne Fereday 26'; Martin Allen 90'			Stadium: Loftus Road; Attendance: 6,078; Referee: Jim Borrett

11 October 1988 Round 2 (2nd leg)	Cardiff City	1–4 (1–7 agg.)	Queens Park Rangers	Cardiff
19:45	Alan Curtis 7'		10' Mark Stein; 56' Mark Falco; 81' Mark Falco; 59' Danny Maddix	Stadium: Ninian Park; Attendance: 2,629; Referee: Roger Milford (Bristol)

=== FA Cup ===
19 November 1988 Round 1	Cardiff City	3–0	Hereford United	Cardiff
15:00	Kevin Bartlett; Steve Tupling 67'; Jimmy Gilligan 73'			Stadium: Ninian Park; Attendance: 4,341

11 December 1988 Round 2	Enfield	1–4	Cardiff City	Enfield, London
14:00	Bate 76'		44' (pen.) Paul Wimbleton; 49' Steve Lynex; 54' Jimmy Gilligan; 73' Jimmy Gilligan	Stadium: Southbury Road; Attendance: 3,604; Referee: David Hutchinson (Cambridge)

7 January 1989 Round 3	Cardiff City	1–2	Hull City	Cardiff
15:00	Jimmy Gilligan 3'		Nicky Brown; 70' Keith Edwards	Stadium: Ninian Park; Attendance: 7,128; Referee: Paul Vanes (West Midlands)

=== Welsh Cup ===
15 November 1988 Round 3	Cardiff City	3–0	Bath City	Cardiff
19:45	Kevin Bartlett; Kevin Bartlett; Paul Wimbleton 72'			Stadium: Ninian Park; Attendance: 1,517; Referee: Keith Burge (Tonypandy)

17 January 1989 Round 4	Cardiff City	1–0	Worcester City	Cardiff
19:45	Mark Kelly 60'			Stadium: Ninian Park; Attendance: 1,522; Referee: P Hughes (Merthyr)

8 February 1989 Round 5	Kidderminster Harriers	3–1	Cardiff City	Kidderminster
19:30	Goal		Kevin Bartlett	Stadium: Aggborough Stadium; Attendance: 3,012; Referee: Howard King (Merthyr Tydfil)

=== Sherpa Van Trophy ===
6 December 1988 Preliminary round	Cardiff City	2–0	Swansea City	Cardiff
19:45	Alan Curtis 47'; Jimmy Gilligan 71'			Stadium: Ninian Park; Attendance: 2,986; Referee: Bob Hamer (Bristol)

20 December 1988 Preliminary round	Torquay United	3–1	Cardiff City	Torquay
	Roger Gibbins; Roger Gibbins; Jim Smith		8' (pen.) Paul Wimbleton	Stadium: Plainmoor; Attendance: 1,187

24 January 1989 Round 1	Bristol Rovers	2–1	Cardiff City	Bath, Somerset
20:00	Paul Smith 14'; Andy Reece		55' Paul Wimbleton	Stadium: Twerton Park; Attendance: 4,029

=== UEFA Cup Winners Cup ===
7 September 1988 Round 1 (1st Leg)	Derry City	0–0	Cardiff City	Derry
17:30				Stadium: Brandywell Stadium; Attendance: 10,500; Referee: John Blankenstein (Netherlands)

5 October 1988 Round 1 (2nd Leg)	Cardiff City	4–0 (4–0 agg.)	Derry City	Cardiff
19:45	Brian McDermott 20'; Jimmy Gilligan 47', 64', 76'			Stadium: Ninian Park; Attendance: 6,993; Referee: Egil Nervik (Norway)

26 October 1988 Round 2 (1st Leg)	Cardiff City	1–2	AGF Aarhus	Cardiff
19:45	Jimmy Gilligan 43'		8', 73' Bjørn Kristensen	Stadium: Ninian Park; Attendance: 6,156; Referee: Roger Phillipi (Luxembourg)

9 November 1988 Round 2 (2nd Leg)	AGF Aarhus	4–0 (6–1 agg.)	Cardiff City	Aarhus
	Frank Pingel 15'; Per Beck Andersen 25', 75'; John Stampe 83' (pen.)			Stadium: Aarhus Stadium; Attendance: 3,700; Referee: Kaj Natri (Finland)

== See also ==
- List of Cardiff City F.C. seasons

== Bibliography ==
- Hayes, Dean (2006). The Who's Who of Cardiff City. Breedon Books. ISBN 1-85983-462-0.
- Crooks, John (1986). Cardiff City Chronology 1920-86. John Crooks. ISBN 0-9511984-0-8.
- Shepherd, Richard (2002). The Definitive Cardiff City F.C. Tony Brown. ISBN 1-899-46817-X.
- Crooks, John (1992). Cardiff City Football Club: Official History of the Bluebirds. Yore Publications. ISBN 0-9513321-8-X.
- Rollin, Jack, ed. (1990). Rothmans Football Yearbook 1989-90. Queen Anne Press. ISBN 0-356-17910-9.
- "Football Club History Database – Cardiff City". Archived from the original on 30 December 2008.
- Welsh Football Data Archive
