= List of Cardiff City F.C. players =

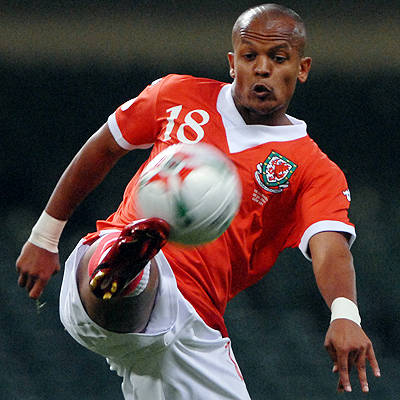
Robert Earnshaw, the club's third highest scorer of all time and the most recent player to pass 100 goals.

Cardiff City Football Club is a professional association football club based in Cardiff, Wales. The club was founded in 1899 as Riverside A.F.C., by members of a local cricket club, and joined the Cardiff & District League the following year. In 1907, they joined the South Wales Amateur League and changed their name to Cardiff City, later entering the English football pyramid by joining the Southern Football League in 1910. They were elected into the Football League ten years later, where they remain to this day. As of the end of the 2017–18 season, the club has won 3 division titles in the Football League, won promotion on 13 occasions and been relegated 12 times.

All players who have featured in 100 or more first-team matches in all competitions for the club since they joined the English football pyramid in 1910, either as a member of the starting eleven or as a substitute, are listed below. Billy Hardy is the current holder of appearance records in both league matches and all competitions having made 590 appearances in a 20-year spell at the club between 1911 and 1932. Phil Dwyer has made the most appearances for the club in the Football League era, having made 575 appearances between 1972 and 1985. Only nine players have made more than 400 appearances for the club, three of which, Dwyer, Fred Keenor and Ron Stitfall were born and raised in Cardiff. The most recent player to reach 400 appearances for the club is Peter Whittingham.

The all-time goalscoring record is held by Len Davies, who had a twelve-year spell at Cardiff between 1919 and 1931, scoring 179 times. Seven other players have scored 100 goals or more for the club. Robert Earnshaw is the most recent player to reach the mark and also holds the club record for goals in a single season, scoring 35 during 2002–03. Midfielder Aron Gunnarsson holds the record for the most international caps won during his spell at the club having represented Iceland 60 times.

== Key ==
- The list is ordered by alphabetical order of surname.
- Appearances as a substitute are included. This feature of the game was introduced in the Football League at the start of the 1965–66 season.
- Statistics are correct as of the match played on 2 May 2026.

Positions key (Note: For more information, see Formation.)
Pre-1960s		1960s–	
GK	Goalkeeper		
FB	Full back	DF	Defender
HB	Half back	MF	Midfielder
FW	Forward		

Nationality
Unless otherwise noted, the nationality of a player is determined by the country/countries which he has played for, or if said person has not played international football, his country of birth.
Position
Playing positions are listed according to the tactical formations that were employed at the time. Thus the change in the names of defence and midfield positions reflects the tactical evolution that occurred from the 1960s onwards.
Club career
Club career is defined as the first and last calendar years in which the player appeared for the club in any of the competitions listed below.
Total appearances and Total goals
Total appearances and goals comprise those in the Southern Football League, Football League, Premier League, FA Cup, League Cup, Welsh Cup, Football League Trophy, Football League Third Division South Cup and FA Charity Shield as well as European matches in the European Cup Winners Cup. Wartime fixtures are not included. Due to the unavailability of complete statistics, seasons prior to 1910 in the amateur Welsh leagues are not included.

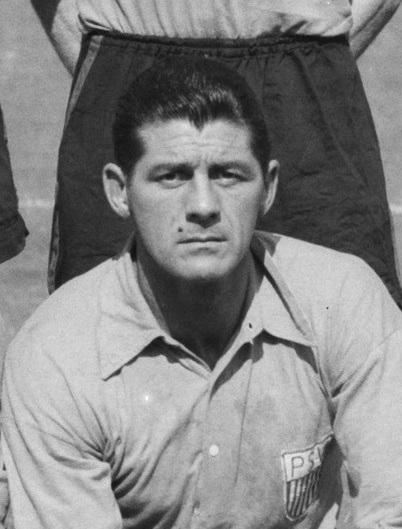
Trevor Ford was the club's top scorer during the 1954–55 season

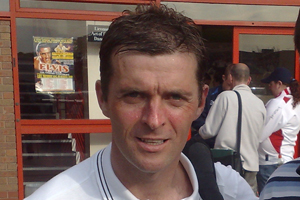
Willie Boland made over 200 appearances for the club between 1999 and 2006

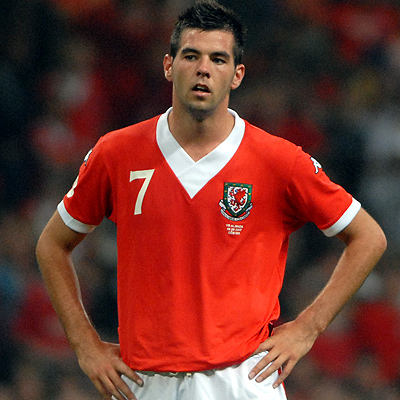
Joe Ledley, made over 250 appearances for the club between 2004 and 2010

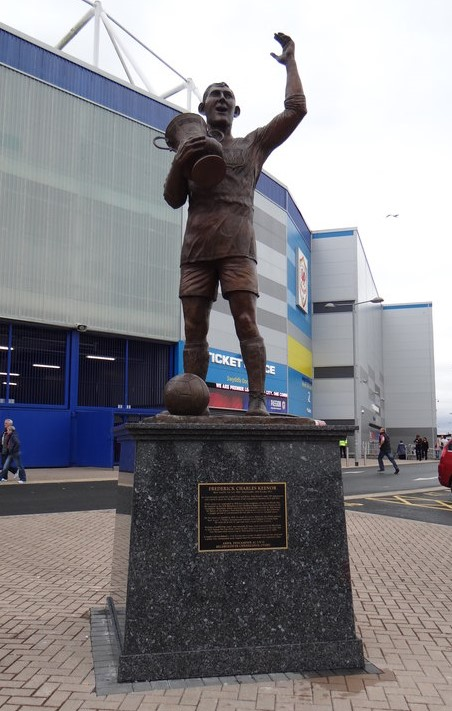
Statue of Fred Keenor, who made over 500 appearances and captained the 1927 FA Cup Final winning side, at the Cardiff City Stadium.

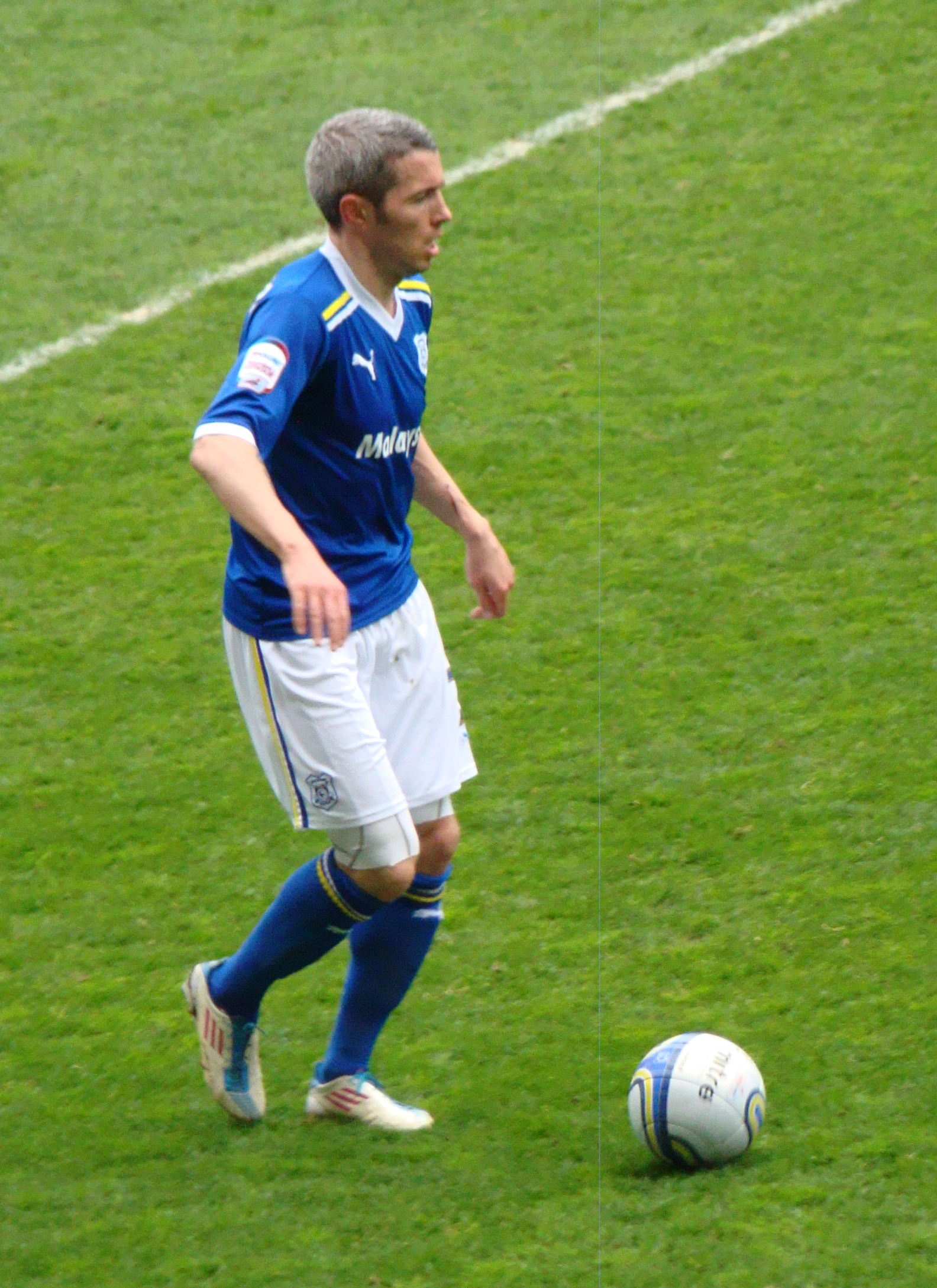
Kevin McNaughton made over 290 appearances for the club between 2006 and 2015

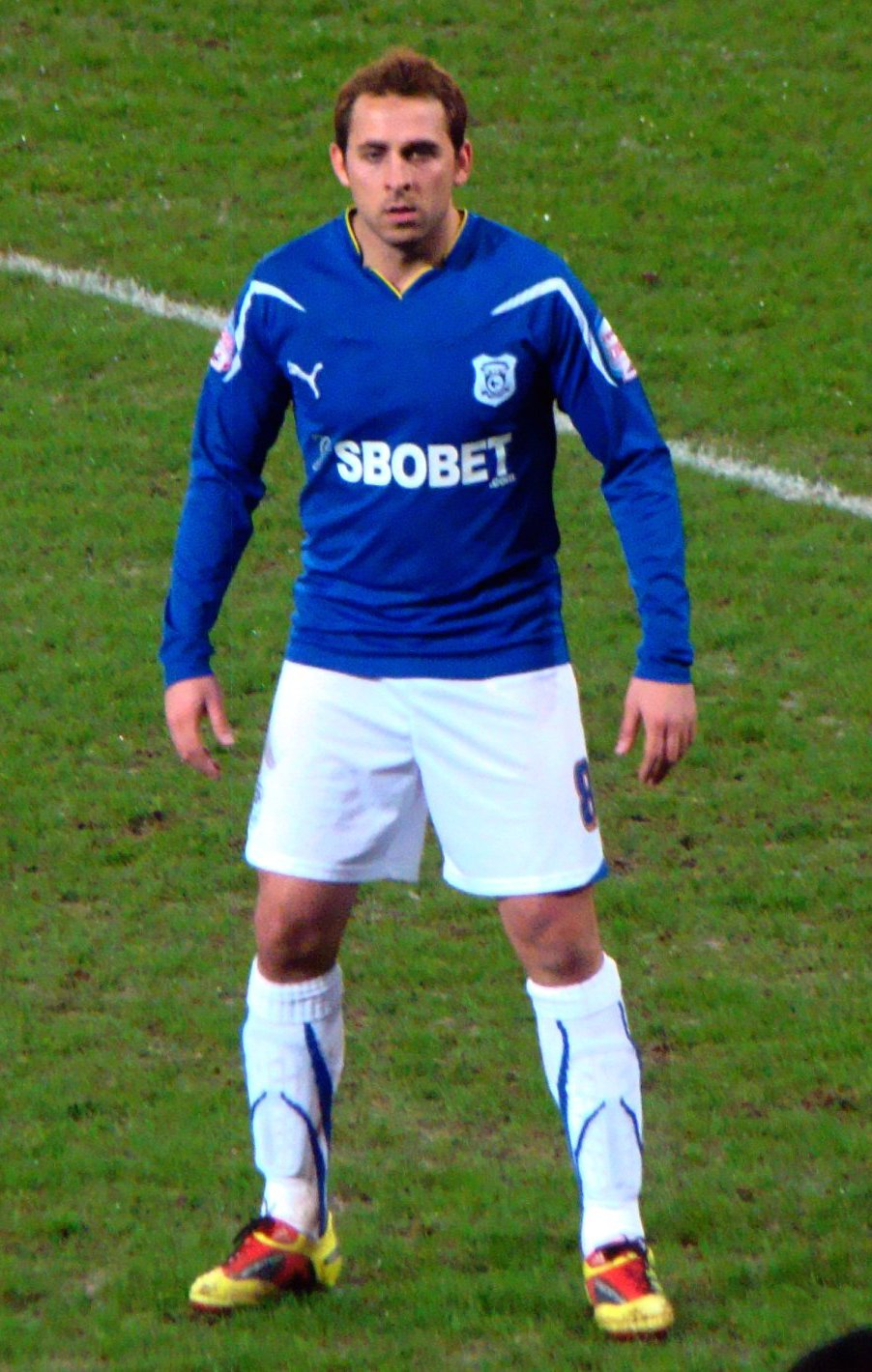
Michael Chopra who had three separate spells with the Bluebirds

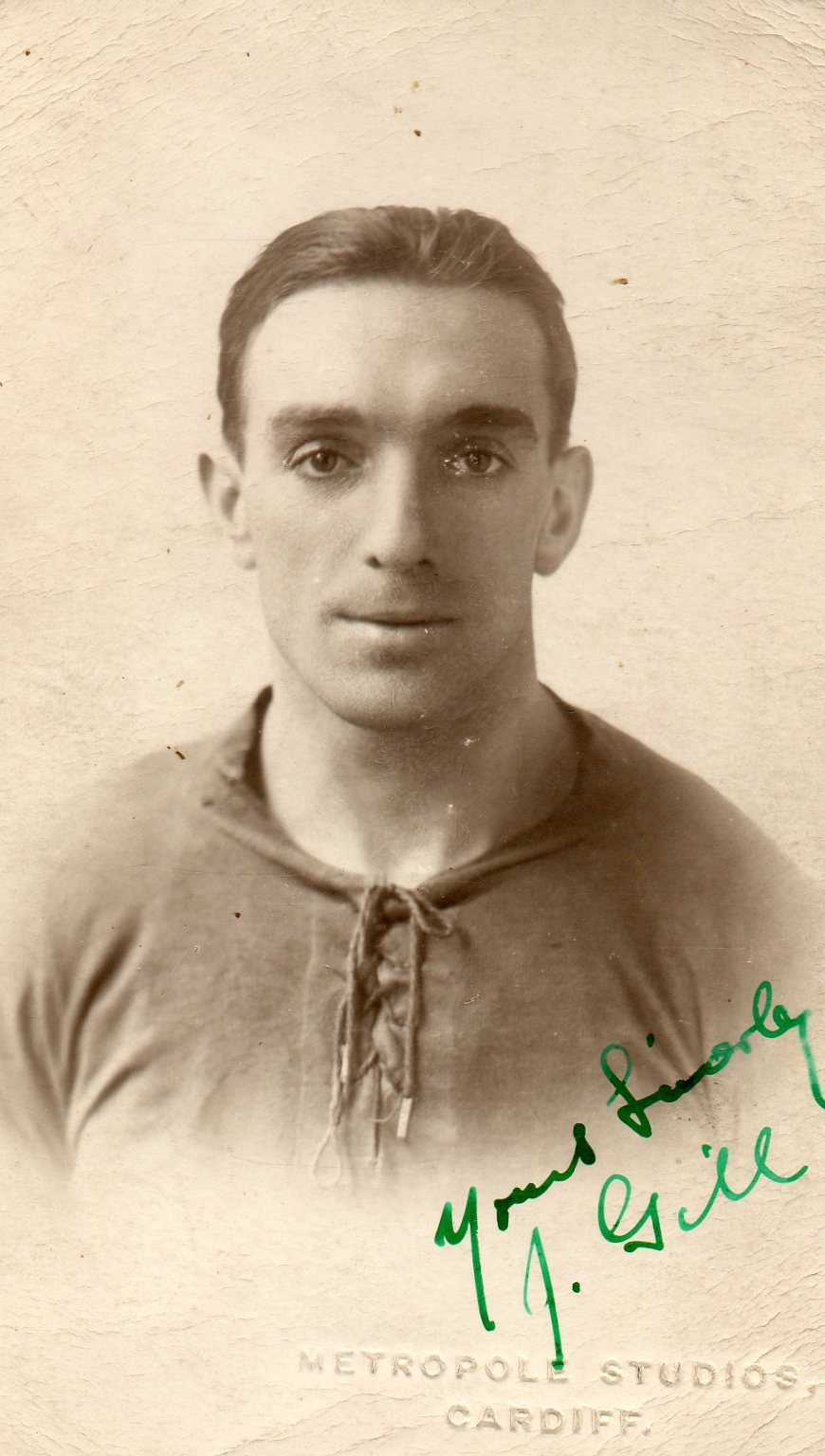
Jimmy Gill, one of seven players to have scored over 100 goals for the club

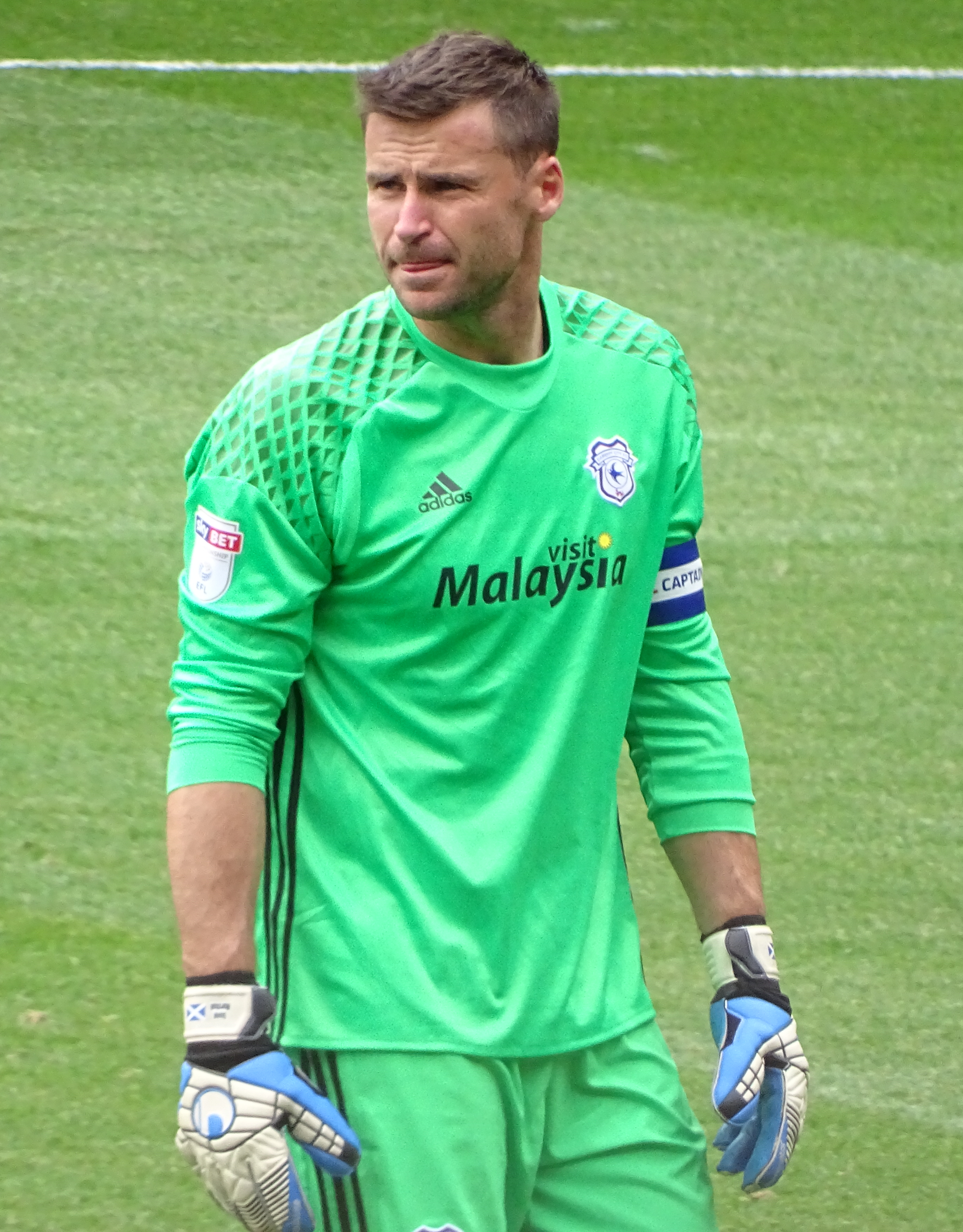
David Marshall made 278 appearances for the club, the second most by any goalkeeper, behind only Tom Farquharson

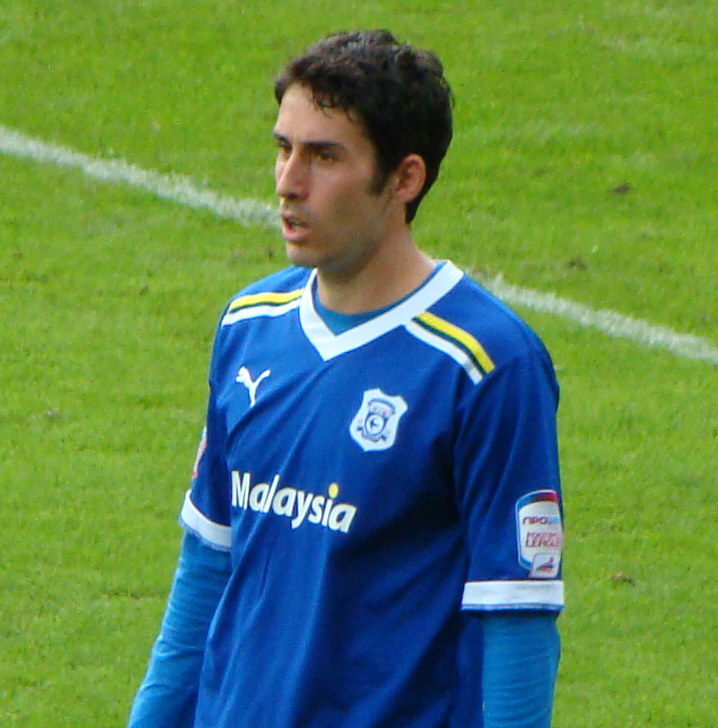
Peter Whittingham, the most recent player to reach 400 appearances for the club

Key
Symbol	Meaning
‡	Player still at the club
†	Player represented his country at international level during his time at the club
*	Club record

== List ==
Player	Nationality	Position	Club career	Appearances (Note: Statistics are sourced from the general references listed below to the date of publication. Players featuring after those dates are sourced from their Soccerbase profile listed in the notes column.)	Goals	Notes
Gareth Abraham	Wales	DF	1987–1993	117	2	
Neil Alexander	Scotland †	GK	2001–2007	234	0	
Ivor Allchurch	Wales †	FW	1962–1965	126	47	
Willie Anderson	England	MF	1973–1977	154	12	
Brian Attley	Wales	DF	1973–1979	100	0	
Lee Baddeley	Wales	DF	1990–1997	172	1	
Leandro Bacuna	Curaçao*	MF	2019–2022	115	4	
Joel Bagan‡	Republic of Ireland	FB	2020–	130	4	
Billy Baker	Wales †	HB	1938–1955	325	7	
Colin Baker	Wales †	HB	1953–1966	361	20	(Note: Represented Wales at the 1958 FIFA World Cup whilst playing for Cardiff City.)
Sol Bamba	Ivory Coast	DF	2016–2021	118	10	
Chris Barker	England	FB	2002–2007	180	0	
Kevin Bartlett	England	FW	1986–1989	116	34	
Billy Bassett	Wales	DF	1934–1938	175	2	
George Beare	England	FW	1914–1921	112	21	
Gary Bell	England	FB	1966–1974	292	14	
Joe Bennett	England	FB	2016–2021	177	5	
Gary Bennett	England	DF	1981–1984	106	13	
Ronnie Bird	England	FW	1966–1971	145	35	
Tony Bird	Wales	FW	1992–1996	110	22	
Ray Bishop	Wales	FW	1977–1981	127	31	
George Blackburn	England	HB	1926–1931	132	2	
Doug Blair	England	FW	1947–1954	224	30	
Jimmy Blair	Scotland †	FB	1920–1926	219	0	
Darcy Blake	Wales †	DF	2005–2012	118	0	
Nathan Blake	Wales	FW	1990–1994	179	41	
Willie Boland	Republic of Ireland	MF	1999–2006	243	4	
Mark Bonner	England	MF	1998–2004	170	3	
Jay Bothroyd	England †	FW	2008–2011	133	45	
Jason Bowen	Wales	MF	1998–2004	161	37	
Terry Boyle	Wales	DF	1986–1989	169	10	
Derek Brazil	Republic of Ireland	DF	1992–1996	153	1	
Charlie Brittain	England	DF	1913–1922	180	0	
John Buchanan	Scotland	MF	1974–1981	286	67	
Chris Burke	Scotland	MF	2009–2011	121	16	
Alan Campbell	Scotland	HB	1976–1980	203	2	
David Carver	England	FB	1966–1973	269	2	
Clive Charles	England	DF	1974–1977	103	5	
Michael Chopra	England	FW	2006–2007, 2008–2009 & 2009–2011	162	65	
Brian Clark	England	FW	1967–1972 & 1975–1976	268	108	
Joe Clennell	England	FW	1921–1924	142	45	
Graham Coldrick	Wales	FB	1963–1970	126	4	
Rubin Colwill‡	Wales*	MF	2020–	190	23	
Matthew Connolly	England	DF	2012–2020	146	7	
Alan Curtis	Wales †	MF	1986–1989	163	15	
Carl Dale	Wales	FW	1991–1998	269	103	
Fred Davies	England	GK	1968–1970	122	0	
Len Davies	Wales †	FW	1919–1931	372	179* (Note: Len Davies is the club's all-time record top goalscorer in all competitions.)	
Phil Dwyer	Wales †	DF	1972–1985	575 (Note: Phil Dwyer has the most appearances for the club in the Football League.)	51	
Robert Earnshaw	Wales †	FW	1997–2004, 2011–2013	227	109	
Jeff Eckhardt	England	MF	1996–2001	164	17	
Bruno Ecuele Manga	Gabon †	DF	2014–2019	159	6	
George Edwards	Wales †	FW	1948–1955	222	46	
George Emmerson	England	FW	1930–1933	136	21	
Herbie Evans	Wales †	HB	1920–1926	119	2	
Neil Etheridge	Philippines*	GK	2017–2020	102	0	
Jack Evans	Wales †	FW	1910–1926	424	68	(Note: Jack Evans was the first player to win an international cap whilst playing for Cardiff City in 1912.)
Tony Evans	England	FW	1975–1978	152	60	
Tom Farquharson	Ireland †	GK	1922–1935	518	0	
Greg Farrell	Scotland	FW	1964–1967	121	12	
Bobby Ferguson	England	FB	1965–1968	118	1	
Hughie Ferguson	Scotland	FW	1925–1929	139	92	
Mike Ford	England	FB	1984–1987 & 1998–2000	248	16	
Trevor Ford	Wales †	FW	1953–1956	110	59	
Leo Fortune-West	England	FW	2000–2003	113	28	
Jason Fowler	England	MF	1996–2001	169	20	
Danny Gabbidon	Wales †	DF	2000–2005; 2014–2015 (Note: Includes spell as player-manager.)	221	10	
Jack Galbraith	Scotland	HB	1931–1935	161	2	
Roger Gibbins	England	MF	1982–1985 & 1988–1993	345	33	
Ian Gibson	Scotland	MF	1970–1972	120	18	
David Giles	Wales	MF	1974–1978 & 1985–1987	151	12	
Jimmy Gill	England	FW	1920–1925	220	101	
Jimmy Gilligan	England	FW	1987–1989	131	49	
Cliff Godfrey	England	HB	1935–1938	116	1	
Wilf Grant	England	FW	1949–1954	168	73	
Arthur Granville	Wales	FB	1934–1938	112	8	
Steve Grapes	England	MF	1976–1982	182	7	
Cohen Griffith	Guyana	MF	1989–1995	299	54	
Billy Grimshaw	England	FW	1919–1923	160	30	
Aron Gunnarsson	Iceland †	MF	2011–2019	286	25	(Note: Represented Iceland at the UEFA Euro 2016 whilst playing for Cardiff City.)
Jon Hallworth	England	GK	1997–2001	147	0	
Roger Hansbury	England	GK	1989–1992	123	0	
Billy Hardy	England	DF	1911–1932	590* (Note: Billy Hardy is the club's all-time record appearance holder in all competitions.)	10	
Alan Harrington	Wales †	FB	1952–1966	405	7	
Brian Harris	England	HB	1966–1971	202	1	
Francis Harris	England	HB	1928–1933	146	13	
Kidder Harvey	England	DF	1912–1920	124	8	
Ron Healey	Republic of Ireland †	GK	1974–1982	266	0	
Gerry Hitchens	England	FW	1955–1957	108	57	
Junior Hoilett	Canada †	MF	2016–2021	183	24	
Barrie Hole	Wales †	HB	1959–1966	264	20	
Ken Hollyman	Wales	HB	1946–1953	213	11	
Ron Howells	Wales †	GK	1950–1957	172	0	
Mark Hudson	England	DF	2009–2014	165	11	
Bill Irwin	Northern Ireland	GK	1971–1978	231	0	
Lee Jarman	Wales	DF	1993–1999	111	2	
Jack Jennings	England	DF	1925–1929	106	0	
Dilwyn John	Wales	GK	1961–1967	109	0	
Roger Johnson	England	DF	2006–2009	136	14	
Barrie Jones	Wales †	FW	1967–1970	137	25	
Linden Jones	Wales	FB	1978–1983	170	3	
Leslie Jones	Wales †	FW	1929–1934	161	38	
Phil Joslin	England	GK	1948–1951	122	0	
Graham Kavanagh	Republic of Ireland †	MF	2001–2005	165	31	
Fred Keenor	Wales †	DF	1912–1930	507	23	
Mark Kelly	England	MF	1987–1990	143	5	
Peter King	England	FW	1960–1974	477	111	
Jack Kneeshaw	England	GK	1912–1924	163	0	
Albert Larmour	Northern Ireland	DF	1972–1979	202	1	
Leslie Lea	England	FW	1967–1970	100	16	
Joe Ledley	Wales †	MF	2004–2010	256	30	
Andy Legg	Wales †	FB	1998–2003	209	12	
Arthur Lever	Wales	FB	1946–1950	171	9	
Bernie Lewis	Wales	FW	1963–1967	117	14	
John Lewis	Wales	MF	1978–1983	167	11	
Doug Livermore	England	MF	1975–1977	118	6	
Glenn Loovens	Netherlands	DF	2005–2008	115	3	
Danny Malloy	Scotland	DF	1955–1961	262	2	
David Marshall	Scotland †	GK	2009–2016	278	0	
Joe Mason	Republic of Ireland	FW	2011–2016	109	25	
Jimmy McCambridge	Ireland †	FW	1930–1933	108	55	
George McLachlan	Scotland	FW	1925–1929	167	26	
Kevin McNaughton	Scotland †	FB	2006–2015	292	2	
Stephen McPhail	Republic of Ireland	MF	2006–2013	222	3	
Tarki Micallef	Wales	MF	1978–1983 & 1984–1986	151	16	
Craig Middleton	England	MF	1996–2000	142	11	
Paul Millar	Northern Ireland	MF	1991–1995	157	22	
Alec Milne	Scotland	FB	1957–1965	198	2	
Stan Montgomery	England	DF	1948–1955	257	4	
Graham Moore	Wales †	MF	1957–1961	101	33	
Sean Morrison	England	DF	2014–2022	295	33	
Jimmy Mullen	England	DF	1981–1986	160	12	
Don Murray	Scotland	DF	1962–1975	532	9	
Curtis Nelson	England	DF	2019–2023	127	3	
Jimmy Nelson	Scotland †	FB	1921–1930	295	4	
Perry Ng‡	England	DF	2021–	223	15	
George Nicholson	England	HB	1936–1939	118	0	
Craig Noone	England	MF	2012–2017	170	19	
Kevin Nugent	England	FW	1997–2002	118	37	
Cliff Nugent	England	FW	1951–1958	132	24	
Wayne O'Sullivan	Republic of Ireland	MF	1997–1999	100	5	
Marlon Pack	England	MF	2019–2022	109	5	
Paul Parry	Wales †	MF	2004–2009	214	27	
Callum Paterson	Scotland †	MF	2017–2020	106	21	
Lee Peltier	England	DF	2015–2020	163	0	
Jason Perry	Wales †	DF	1987–1997	361	5	
Freddie Pethard	Scotland	FB	1969–1979	213	1	
Leighton Phillips	Wales †	DF	1967–1974	233	16	
Chris Pike	Wales	FW	1986 & 1989–1993	197	84	
Anthony Pilkington	Republic of Ireland †	MF	2014–2019	111	23	
Nick Platnauer	England	FB	1986–1989	153	9	
Keith Pontin	Wales †	DF	1976–1983	237	5	
Reg Pugh	Wales	FW	1934–1938	191	29	(Note: Player statistics exclude three games played in the abandoned 1939–40 season.)
Darren Purse	England	DF	2005–2009	124	12	
Gavin Rae	Scotland †	MF	2007–2011	153	8	
Joe Ralls	England	MF	2011–2025	409	34	
Paul Ramsey	England	MF	1991–1993 & 1994	107	10	
Gil Reece	Wales †	MF	1972–1976	131	34	
Billy Rees	Wales †	FW	1946–1949	108	36	
Nick Richardson	England	MF	1992–1995	142	17	
William Roberts	England	FB	1928–1933	146	1	
Callum Robinson‡	Republic of Ireland*	FW	2022–	129	33	
Ian Rodgerson	England	MF	1988–1991 & 1995–1997	200	8	
Peter Rodrigues	Wales †	FB	1961–1965	112	2	
Billy Ronson	England	MF	1979–1981	103	4	
Charles Rutter	England	FB	1949–1958	133	0	
Peter Sayer	Wales †	MF	1974–1978	114	20	
Damon Searle	Wales	FB	1990–1996	297	5	
Alf Sherwood	Wales †	FB	1946–1956	381	15	(Note: Alf Sherwood holds the record for most international caps gained whilst playing for Cardiff City with 39.)
Derek Showers	Wales †	FW	1970–1977	113	17	
Bert Smith	Ireland †	DF	1919–1923	169	5	
Alex Smithies	England	GK	2018–2022	100	0	
Fred Stansfield	Wales †	DF	1946–1949	113	1	
Phil Stant	England	FW	1993–1995	106	55	
Gary Stevens	England	FW	1978–1982	175	51	
Nigel Stevenson	England	MF	1985–1986 & 1987–1989	101	3	
Ron Stitfall	Wales †	FB	1947–1964	452	8	
Derrick Sullivan	Wales †	HB	1947–1961	309	21	(Note: Represented Wales at the 1958 FIFA World Cup whilst playing for Cardiff City.)
Mel Sutton	England	MF	1967–1972	181	7	
Les Talbot	England	FW	1936–1939	116	25	
Ollie Tanner‡	England	FW	2022–	100	7	
Derek Tapscott	Wales †	FW	1958–1965	234	102	
Andrew Taylor	England	FB	2011–2014	115	2	
Billy Thirlaway	England	MF	1927–1929	125	23	
Rod Thomas	Wales †	FB	1977–1981	114	0	
Steven Thompson	Scotland	FW	2006–2008	106	17	
Peter Thorne	England	FW	2001–2005	143	51	
Mike Tiddy	England	FW	1950–1955	162	26	
David Tong	England	MF	1982–1985	142	5	
John Toshack	Wales †	FW	1965–1970	208	100	
Ben Turner	England	DF	2011–2016	121	4	
Nigel Vaughan	Wales †	MF	1983–1987	182	53	
Will Vaulks	Wales	MF	2019–2022	117	11	
Graham Vearncombe	Wales †	GK	1952–1963	241	0	(Note: Represented Wales at the 1958 FIFA World Cup whilst playing for Cardiff City.)
Harry Wake	Wales	HB	1923–1931	179	10	
Brian Walsh	England	MF	1955–1961	240	41	
George Walton	England	FW	1936–1938	103	19	
Tom Watson	Ireland †	DF	1925–1929	102	0	
George West	Wales	FW	1913–1921	107	40	
Rhys Weston	Wales †	FB	2000–2006	213	2	
Paul Wheeler	Wales	MF	1985–1989	130	15	
Peter Whittingham	England	MF	2007–2017	457	96	
Gareth Williams	England	MF	1961–1967	209	16	
Glyn Williams	Wales †	FB	1946–1952	160	1	
Roley Williams	Wales	FW	1949–1956	144	19	
Bob Wilson	England	GK	1964–1970	151	0	
Paul Wimbleton	England	MF	1986–1989	155	27	
Ryan Wintle	England	MF	2021–2026	163	6	
Bobby Woodruff	England	MF	1969–1974	197	32	
Scott Young	Wales	DF	1993–2004	333	26	
Kenneth Zohore	Denmark	FW	2016–2019	101	24	
