= Ketteridge =

Ketteridge is a surname. Notable people with the surname include:

- Martin Ketteridge (born 1964), Scottish rugby league player
- Steve Ketteridge (born 1959), English footballer
