= Kevin Bartlett (footballer, born 1962) =

English footballer

Personal information
- Full name: Kevin Francis Bartlett
- Date of birth: 12 October 1962 (age 64)
- Place of birth: Portsmouth, England
- Height: 5 ft 8 in (1.73 m)
- Position: Forward

Youth career
- Portsmouth

Senior career*
Years	Team	Apps	(Gls)
1980–1982	Portsmouth	3	(0)
1982–1986	Fareham Town		
1986–1989	Cardiff City	82	(25)
1989–1990	West Bromwich Albion	37	(10)
1990–1993	Notts County	99	(33)
1992	→ Port Vale (loan)	5	(1)
1992–1993	Cambridge United	8	(1)
- * Club domestic league appearances and goals

Kevin Francis Bartlett (born 12 October 1962) is an English former professional footballer who played as a forward.

He began his career at his hometown club Portsmouth in 1980 but dropped into non-League football with Fareham Town two years later. Signing with Cardiff City in September 1986, he helped the "Bluebirds" to the Welsh Cup and promotion out of the Fourth Division in 1987–88. He moved on to West Bromwich Albion in 1989 before joining Notts County a year later. He helped the "Magpies" to promotion out of the Second Division in 1991. Loaned out to Port Vale in 1992, he retired due to injury in 1993, not long after joining Cambridge United.

== Career ==
Bartlett started his career with his hometown club Portsmouth but struggled to make an impact under Frank Burrows and played just Third Division games in 1980–81 and 1981–82 before he dropped into non-League football with Fareham Town. He played 197 games in the Southern Football League for the "Creeksiders", scoring 98 goals.

After coming to the attention of former manager Frank Burrows, now in charge at Cardiff City, Bartlett signed for the club in September 1986. He made an impression straight away, scoring twice in a 4–0 win in the Welsh Cup over Taff's Well, followed by another two goals against Cambridge United in a 3–0 victory three days later. Despite his goals, Cardiff struggled in the bottom half of the Fourth Division in 1986–87. Their form soon turned though, with Bartlett forming a strong forward partnership with Jimmy Gilligan, and promotion was achieved with a second-place finish in 1987–88; they also won the Welsh Cup during the campaign. After helping City to settle in the Third Division in 1988–89, he left the "Bluebirds" to sign for West Bromwich Albion, having scored 28 goals in 105 league and cup appearances for Cardiff. Club chairman Tony Clemo would later reveal that the sale of Bartlett had saved the club from filing for bankruptcy.

He only remained at The Hawthorns for one season, scoring 10 goals in 37 Second Division games under Brian Talbot, before moving on to Notts County. He helped Neil Warnock's "Magpies" to win promotion into the top flight with a 3–1 victory over Brighton & Hove Albion in the play-off final at Wembley. However, County suffered relegation out of the First Division in 1991–92, in the last season before the creation of the Premier League. He joined John Rudge's Port Vale on loan at the start of the 1992–93 season, scoring one goal in five appearances at Vale Park, before returning to Meadow Lane. He played a total of 99 league games for Notts County, scoring 32 goals. He moved on to Cambridge United, who suffered relegation out of the second tier in 1992–93 under Ian Atkins' stewardship. Bartlett retired a few months after joining the club due to injury.

== Career statistics ==
Appearances and goals by club, season and competition
Club	Season	League			FA Cup		Other		Total	
Club	Season	Division	Apps	Goals	Apps	Goals	Apps	Goals	Apps	Goals
Portsmouth	1980–81	Third Division	2	0	0	0	0	0	2	0
Portsmouth	1981–82	Third Division	1	0	0	0	0	0	1	0
Portsmouth	Total		3	0	0	0	0	0	3	0
Cardiff City	1986–87	Fourth Division	23	4	4	0	1	0	28	4
Cardiff City	1987–88	Fourth Division	37	12	1	1	5	0	43	13
Cardiff City	1988–89	Third Division	22	9	3	1	9	0	34	10
Cardiff City	Total		82	25	8	2	15	0	105	27
West Bromwich Albion	1988–89	Second Division	17	3	0	0	0	0	17	3
West Bromwich Albion	1989–90	Second Division	20	7	3	1	3	0	26	8
West Bromwich Albion	Total		37	10	3	1	3	0	43	11
Notts County	1989–90	Third Division	14	8	0	0	6	1	20	9
Notts County	1990–91	Second Division	40	13	4	1	8	2	52	16
Notts County	1991–92	First Division	29	7	2	0	3	3	34	10
Notts County	1992–93	First Division	16	5	0	0	1	0	17	5
Notts County	Total		99	33	6	1	18	6	123	40
Port Vale (loan)	1992–93	Second Division	5	1	0	0	0	0	5	1
Cambridge United	1992–93	First Division	8	1	0	0	0	0	8	1

== Honours ==
Cardiff City

- Football League Fourth Division second-place promotion: 1987–88
- Welsh Cup: 1988

Notts County

- Football League Second Division play-offs: 1991
- Football League Third Division play-offs: 1990
