= Richard Haig =

Welsh footballer and manager

Personal information
- Full name: Richard Neil Haig
- Date of birth: 29 December 1970 (age 55)
- Place of birth: Wattstown, Wales
- Position: Striker

Senior career*
Years	Team	Apps	(Gls)
1988–1990	Cardiff City	5	(0)
1990–1993	Merthyr Tydfil	?	(?)
1993–1996	Ton Pentre	110	(45)
1996–1998	Inter Cabletel	47	(11)

Managerial career
- 2007–20??: Cambrian & Clydach Vale
- 2014–2015: AFC Porth
- 2015–: Trebanog FC
- * Club domestic league appearances and goals

Richard Neil Haig (born 29 December 1970) is a Welsh former professional footballer, who is manager of Trebanog FC in the Rhondda and District Football League. He was also formerly manager of Welsh Football League Division One sides Cambrian & Clydach Vale and AFC Porth.

== Playing career ==
Haig began his career at Cardiff City, making his debut towards the end of 1988–89 season as a substitute during a match against Brentford. The following season he made four appearances, including his first start against Shrewsbury Town, as the club suffered relegation to Division Four. At the end of the season, Haig was released and joined Merthyr Tydfil. After three seasons with Merthyr, Haig moved into the Welsh Premier League with Ton Pentre, his most prolific scoring year coming during the 1994–95 season when he finished the year with 19 goals. He left Ton Pentre in 1996, spending two years with Inter Cabletel.

== Management career ==
During the 2007–08 season, Haig was appointed manager of Welsh Football League Division One side Cambrian & Clydach Vale, having previously acted as both assistant manager and reserve team manager at the club.

In July 2014 he was appointed by AFC Porth as their manager.
