= Paul Batty =

English footballer

Personal information
- Full name: Paul William Batty
- Date of birth: 9 January 1964 (age 62)
- Place of birth: Edlington, England
- Height: 5 ft 7 in (1.70 m)
- Position: Midfielder

Youth career
- Swindon Town

Senior career*
Years	Team	Apps	(Gls)
1982–1985	Swindon Town	108	(7)
1985–1986	Chesterfield	26	(0)
1986–1991	Exeter City	111	(11)
1991–1993	Yeovil Town	83	(9)
1993–1994	Bath City	31	(3)
1994–1995	Salisbury City	18	(3)
- * Club domestic league appearances and goals

Paul William Batty (born 9 January 1964) is an English former professional footballer who made nearly 250 appearances in the Football League. He played as a midfielder.

Batty began his career as an apprentice with Swindon Town, turning professional in January 1982. He made his debut on 25 September 1982 as Swindon won 1–0 at home to Crewe Alexandra and remained a regular for the next two seasons. He lost his place late in 1985 and was released at the end of the season.

He joined Chesterfield but left to join Exeter City in 1986. After five years with Exeter he dropped out of league football, joining Yeovil Town in March 1991. In 1992, he scored a hat-trick as Yeovil knocked Football League team Torquay United out of the FA Cup. He joined Bath City in July 1993, scoring the goal that knocked league side Hereford United out of the following season's FA Cup. He struggled with a knee injury towards the end of the season and left to join Salisbury City in July 1994.

== Honours ==
Exeter City

- Football League Fourth Division: 1989–90
