= Scott Endersby =

English footballer (born 1962)

Personal information
- Full name: Scott Ian Glenn Endersby
- Date of birth: 20 February 1962 (age 64)
- Place of birth: Lewisham, England
- Height: 5 ft 10 in (1.78 m)
- Position: Goalkeeper

Senior career*
Years	Team	Apps	(Gls)
- Irthlingborough Diamonds
–1979	Kettering Town		
1979–1981	Ipswich Town	0	(0)
1981–1983	Tranmere Rovers	79	(0)
1983–1985	Swindon Town	85	(0)
1985–1987	Carlisle United	52	(0)
1987–1990	York City	35	(0)
1987–1988	→ Cardiff City (loan)	4	(0)
1988–1989	→ Rochdale (loan)	0	(0)
Total		255	(0)

International career
1979	England Youth	2	(0)
- * Club domestic league appearances and goals

Scott Ian Glenn Endersby (born 20 February 1962) is an English former professional footballer who played as a goalkeeper. He played in the Football League for Tranmere Rovers, Swindon Town, Carlisle United, York City and Cardiff City.

== Club career ==
Born in Lewisham, County of London, Endersby started his career in non-League football when playing for Irthlingborough Diamonds and Kettering Town. With Kettering, he was 15 years and 288 days old when playing in the FA Cup first round against Tilbury on 26 November 1977. Record books credited him with being the youngest player to appear in the FA Cup proper, although some statisticians argued this claim was invalid, with the Football Association declaring the result of the match void due to Kettering fielding an ineligible player. However, Endersby did play in the replay nine days later.

He earned a Football League move after signing for Ipswich Town in March 1979 for a fee of £8,000. He failed to make any league appearances for Ipswich before signing for Tranmere Rovers in July 1981. Having made 79 league appearances in two seasons with Tranmere, Endersby signed for Swindon Town in August 1983. He signed for Carlisle United in November 1985, initially on loan, having made 85 league appearances for Swindon.

After making 52 league appearances for Carlisle, Endersby signed for York City in July 1987. He made his debut in York's 1–0 defeat away at Brighton & Hove Albion on 15 August 1987, but his chances in the team were limited after Chris Marples established himself. Endersby was transfer listed in December 1987 for disciplinary reasons, and later that month joined Cardiff City on loan, where he made four league appearances. He finished the 1987–88 season with 42 appearances for York.

After a spell on loan with Rochdale starting in December 1988, in which he made no league appearances, he went part-time with York in May 1989. He finished his second season at York with a single appearance, against Wrexham in a 1–0 home win on 14 March 1989. Endersby left the club in April 1990 to enter a pub management course before working as a chef.

== International career ==
Endersby was capped by the England national youth team in 1980 while an Ipswich player.
