= Tony Barratt =

English footballer

Personal information
- Full name: Anthony Barratt
- Date of birth: 18 October 1965 (age 61)
- Place of birth: Salford, England
- Height: 5 ft 8 in (1.73 m)
- Position: Full back

Senior career*
Years	Team	Apps	(Gls)
	Billingham Town	?	(?)
1985–1986	Grimsby Town	22	(0)
	Billingham Town	?	(?)
1986–1989	Hartlepool United	98	(4)
1989–1994	York City	147	(10)
	Bishop Auckland	?	(?)
- * Club domestic league appearances and goals

Anthony Barratt (born 18 October 1965) is an English former footballer. He played for Billingham Town, Grimsby Town, Hartlepool United, York City and Bishop Auckland.
