= Alan Curtis (footballer) =

Welsh footballer (born 1954)

Alan Curtis MBE
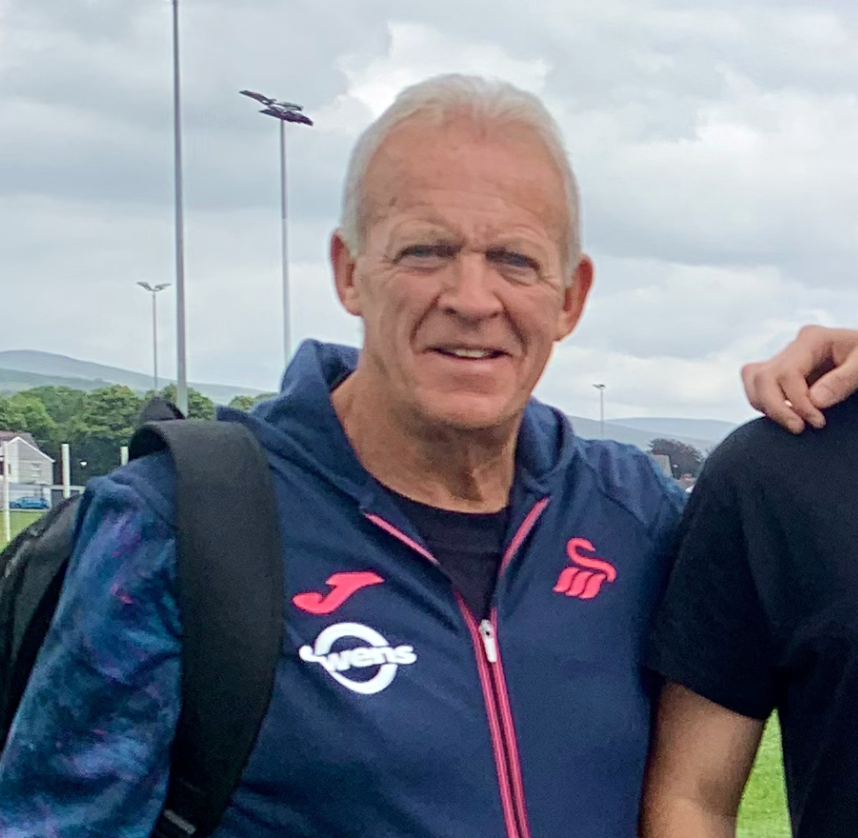

Personal information
- Full name: Alan Thomas Curtis
- Date of birth: 16 April 1954 (age 72)
- Place of birth: Pentre, Rhondda, Wales
- Height: 5 ft 10 in (1.78 m)
- Position: Forward

Team information
- Current team: Swansea City (Honorary President)

Senior career*
Years	Team	Apps	(Gls)
1972–1979	Swansea City	248	(71)
1979–1980	Leeds United	28	(5)
1980–1983	Swansea City	90	(21)
1983–1986	Southampton	50	(5)
1986	→ Stoke City (loan)	3	(0)
1986–1989	Cardiff City	125	(10)
1989–1990	Swansea City	26	(3)
1990–1991	Barry Town	50	(5)
1994	Barry Town	13	(1)
- Haverfordwest County
Total		633	(121)

International career
1972	Wales U18	1	(0)
1976	Wales U21	1	(0)
1976	Wales U23	1	(0)
1976–1987	Wales	35	(6)

Managerial career
- 2004: Swansea City (caretaker)
- 2015–2016: Swansea City (caretaker)
- 2016–2017: Swansea City (caretaker)
- * Club domestic league appearances and goals

Alan Thomas Curtis MBE (born 16 April 1954) is a former Wales international footballer, who played as a forward; he is currently the honorary club president of Swansea City.

He began his career with Swansea City in 1972, and spent the next seven years with the "Swans", winning promotion out of the Fourth Division in 1977–78 and out of the Third Division in 1978–79. He was then sold on to Leeds United, but struggled in the First Division and was sold back to Swansea in 1980. He helped Swansea to win promotion out of the Second Division in 1980–81, but a period of decline for the club followed and he moved on to Southampton in November 1983. He played on loan at Stoke City towards the end of the 1985–86 season, before he joined Cardiff City in the summer. He helped the "Bluebirds" to win promotion out of the Fourth Division in 1987–88 and to also win the 1987–88 Welsh Cup. He made another return to Swansea during the 1989–90 campaign, and later ended his career with Barry Town, winning the Welsh Cup in 1994.

During his career he also represented Wales, scoring six goals in 35 international games. After retiring as a player he spent many years on the backroom staff at Swansea City, and has had several spells as a caretaker-manager.

== Club career ==
=== Swansea City ===
He was born in Pentre, Rhondda on 16 April 1954 to Tydfil and Albert Curtis, a factory worker and coal miner respectively. His uncle, Roy Paul, was a Wales international footballer. He had an unsuccessful trial at Manchester United as a 13-year-old. He represented Rhondda Schools, where he was spotted by Swansea City and offered a trial. He chose to remain at his local Grammar school and pass his A-levels before going to Vetch Field for a trial in 1972, by which time he had already won a Wales under-18 cap.

Manager Roy Bentley handed him his debut in the Football League in a 3–1 defeat to Southend United at Roots Hall in August 1972. Though he did not have an extended run in the first team he did end the 1972–73 campaign with 14 appearances to his name. The team performed poorly, and a change of manager from Bentley to Harry Gregg could not prevent City being relegated out of the Third Division.

Despite being retained by Gregg, Curtis had to work as a builder's apprentice during the summer of 1973 to supplement his low income. Despite the arrival of John Charles as a coach and Herbie Way's promotion to player-coach, Gregg continued the physical style of football favoured by Bentley that did not suit Curtis well. Regardless of being ill-suited to this approach Curtis established himself as a first-team regular and made 40 appearances in the 1973–74 season. Gregg left Swansea midway through the 1974–75 campaign, and new manager Harry Griffiths insisted on playing a pass-and-move style of football. Initial results were poor, and the club had to apply for re-election after finishing 22nd at the end of the campaign.

Griffiths switched Curtis from his usual outside-left to a centre-forward position during the 1975–76 campaign, and the move worked out so well that he remained a striker for the remainder of his career. He claimed nine goals in 43 games, as Swansea improved to an 11th-place finish. He scored 17 goals in 53 appearances during the 1976–77 campaign, but Swansea missed out on promotion after finishing one point behind Bradford City despite boasting the highest goals tally in the Football League.

A disappointing start to the 1977–78 season cost Griffiths his job, and new appointment John Toshack managed to take the club to promotion, with Curtis claiming 34 goals in 46 games to become the division's top-scorer that season. On 12 November, Curtis scored a hat-trick during a home win over Crewe Alexandra. He also claimed a hat-trick in an 8–0 victory over Hartlepool United.

=== Leeds United ===
After scoring just six goals in 35 matches for Leeds he was released in 1980. While he showed promise when he played, injuries kept him sidelined too often and he was let go by Allan Clarke.

=== Return to Swansea ===
He moved back to Swansea City and helped them gain promotion to the First Division in 1980–81. He scored in the South Wales derby on 27 December 1980, in a 3–3 draw with Cardiff City at Ninian Park.

He scored on the opening day of the 1981–82 season, as Swansea beat his former club Leeds 5–1. The season was a highly successful one for both player and club, as he scored ten goals in 45 appearances to help Swansea to a sixth place league finish.

Swansea had a fine first season in the top-flight finishing in 6th position but back to back relegations saw the club slide back down into the Third Division.

=== Southampton ===
Curtis joined Southampton in November 1983 and he spent three seasons at The Dell scoring seven goals in 67 appearances. Towards the end of the 1985–86 season Curtis joined Stoke City on loan playing in three Second Division matches for the Potters.

=== Cardiff City ===
He then joined Cardiff City where he spent four seasons helping the club gain promotion in 1987–88. He scored a goal in the 2–0 win over Wrexham in the 1987–88 Welsh Cup final at Vetch Field.

=== Third spell at Swansea ===
He ended his Football League career with a return to Swansea.

=== Barry Town ===
However, he would experience further playing success in 1994, winning the Welsh Cup with Barry Town at the old National Stadium, aged 40.

== International career ==
Curtis won one cap for the Wales under-18, under-21 and under-23 teams. He went on to score six goals in 35 international matches for the Wales senior team from 1976 to 1987.

== Coaching and managerial career ==
Curtis worked in most backroom staff roles at Swansea City, as well as being a part of Brian Flynn's Wales under-21 coaching set up.

He was appointed Swansea's first-team coach by new manager Michael Laudrup in July 2012.

Curtis continued his role as first-team coach under manager Garry Monk. On 9 December 2015, following the dismissal of Monk, he became caretaker manager on a game-by-game basis as the club searched for a new manager. However, on 7 January 2016, it was confirmed that Curtis would continue as manager until the end of the season. Despite this, on 18 January, Francesco Guidolin was brought in as head coach, with Curtis returning to a coaching role at the club.

Guidolin was dismissed on 3 October 2016 and, after a short period with Bob Bradley in charge, Curtis again served as caretaker-manager before the arrival of Paul Clement in January 2017.

Curtis became Swansea's first Loan Player Manager in January 2017; he monitored the progress of players out on loan.

Curtis was appointed Member of the Order of the British Empire (MBE) in the 2021 New Year Honours for services to Welsh football.

== Personal life ==
He married Clare in 2008 in a ceremony in Swansea. Alan Curtis has two sons and two stepsons.

== Playing statistics ==
=== Club ===
Appearances and goals by club, season and competition
Club	Season	League			FA Cup		League Cup		Other (Note: Includes Football League Trophy, Screen Sport Super Cup, UEFA Cup Winners' Cup and UEFA Cup, as well as the FA Trophy, Welsh Cup, South Wales Senior Cup and Larchimage Windows Cup for Barry Town.)		Total	
Club	Season	Division	Apps	Goals	Apps	Goals	Apps	Goals	Apps	Goals	Apps	Goals
Swansea City	1972–73	Third Division	13	0	1	0	0	0	0	0	14	0
Swansea City	1973–74	Fourth Division	38	4	1	0	1	0	0	0	40	4
Swansea City	1974–75	Fourth Division	37	0	2	0	0	0	0	0	39	0
Swansea City	1975–76	Fourth Division	41	9	1	0	1	0	0	0	43	9
Swansea City	1976–77	Fourth Division	46	14	1	0	6	3	0	0	53	17
Swansea City	1977–78	Fourth Division	39	32	5	2	2	0	0	0	46	34
Swansea City	1978–79	Third Division	34	12	3	5	4	3	0	0	40	20
Swansea City	Total		248	71	14	7	14	6	0	0	276	84
Leeds United	1979–80	First Division	22	4	1	0	2	0	4	1	29	5
Leeds United	1980–81	First Division	6	1	0	0	0	0	0	0	6	1
Leeds United	Total		28	5	1	0	2	0	4	1	35	6
Swansea City	1980–81	Second Division	20	6	1	0	0	0	0	0	21	6
Swansea City	1981–82	First Division	40	10	1	0	2	0	2	0	45	10
Swansea City	1982–83	First Division	21	4	1	0	2	0	3	2	27	6
Swansea City	1983–84	Second Division	9	1	0	0	1	0	2	0	12	1
Swansea City	Total		90	21	3	0	5	0	7	2	105	23
Southampton	1983–84	First Division	9	0	0	0	0	0	0	0	9	0
Southampton	1984–85	First Division	30	4	3	1	7	1	1	0	41	6
Southampton	1985–86	First Division	11	1	0	0	4	0	2	0	17	1
Southampton	Total		50	5	3	1	11	1	3	0	67	7
Stoke City (loan)	1985–86	Second Division	3	0	0	0	0	0	0	0	3	0
Cardiff City	1986–87	Fourth Division	42	4	4	0	3	0	1	0	50	4
Cardiff City	1987–88	Fourth Division	40	2	1	0	2	1	2	0	45	3
Cardiff City	1988–89	Third Division	35	4	3	0	4	1	6	1	48	6
Cardiff City	1989–90	Third Division	8	0	0	0	2	0	0	0	10	0
Cardiff City	Total		125	10	8	0	11	2	9	1	153	13
Swansea City	1989–90	Third Division	26	3	4	0	0	0	1	0	31	3
Barry Town	1990–91	Southern League Midland Division	31	3	4	0	0	0	15	2	50	5
Barry Town	1993–94	League of Wales	10	1	0	0	0	0	3	0	13	1
Barry Town	Total		41	4	4	0	0	0	18	2	63	6
Career total			611	119	37	8	43	9	42	6	733	143

=== International ===
Appearances and goals by national team and year
National team	Year	Apps	Goals
Wales	1976	8	1
Wales	1977	2	0
Wales	1978	2	0
Wales	1979	8	2
Wales	1981	3	1
Wales	1982	5	1
Wales	1983	1	1
Wales	1984	2	0
Wales	1985	3	0
Wales	1987	1	0
Total		35	6

== Managerial statistics ==
As of 3 January 2017

Managerial record by team and tenure
Team	From	To	Record				
Team	From	To	P	W	D	L	Win %
Swansea City	18 March 2004	5 April 2004	4	1	1	2	25.0
Swansea City	9 December 2015	18 January 2016	8	2	2	4	25.0
Swansea City	27 December 2016	3 January 2017	2	1	0	1	50.0
Total			14	4	3	7	28.6

== Honours ==
Swansea City

- Football League Fourth Division Third-place promotion: 1977–78
- Football League Third Division Third-place promotion: 1978–79
- Football League Second Division Third-place promotion: 1980–81

Cardiff City

- Football League Fourth Division Runner-up: 1987–88
- Welsh Cup: 1987–88

Barry Town

- Welsh Cup: 1993–94
