= Jason Gummer =

Welsh footballer

Personal information
- Full name: Jason Craig Gummer
- Date of birth: 27 October 1967 (age 59)
- Place of birth: Tredegar, Wales
- Height: 5 ft 9 in (1.75 m)
- Position: Midfielder

Senior career*
Years	Team	Apps	(Gls)
1985–1989	Cardiff City	34	(5)
1989	→ Torquay United (loan)	7	(1)
1992–1994	Inter Cardiff	43	(1)
1994–1996	Ebbw Vale	40	(4)
- * Club domestic league appearances and goals

Jason Craig Gummer (born 27 October 1967) is a Welsh former professional footballer.

After progressing through the youth setup at Cardiff City, Gummer made his professional debut for the club on 7 September 1985 in a 1–1 draw with York City. However, he struggled with injuries and, after a short loan spell with Torquay United, he was released by the club in 1989. He later played in the Welsh Premier League for Inter Cardiff and Ebbw Vale.
