= Brian McDermott (footballer) =

Association football player and manager (born 1961)

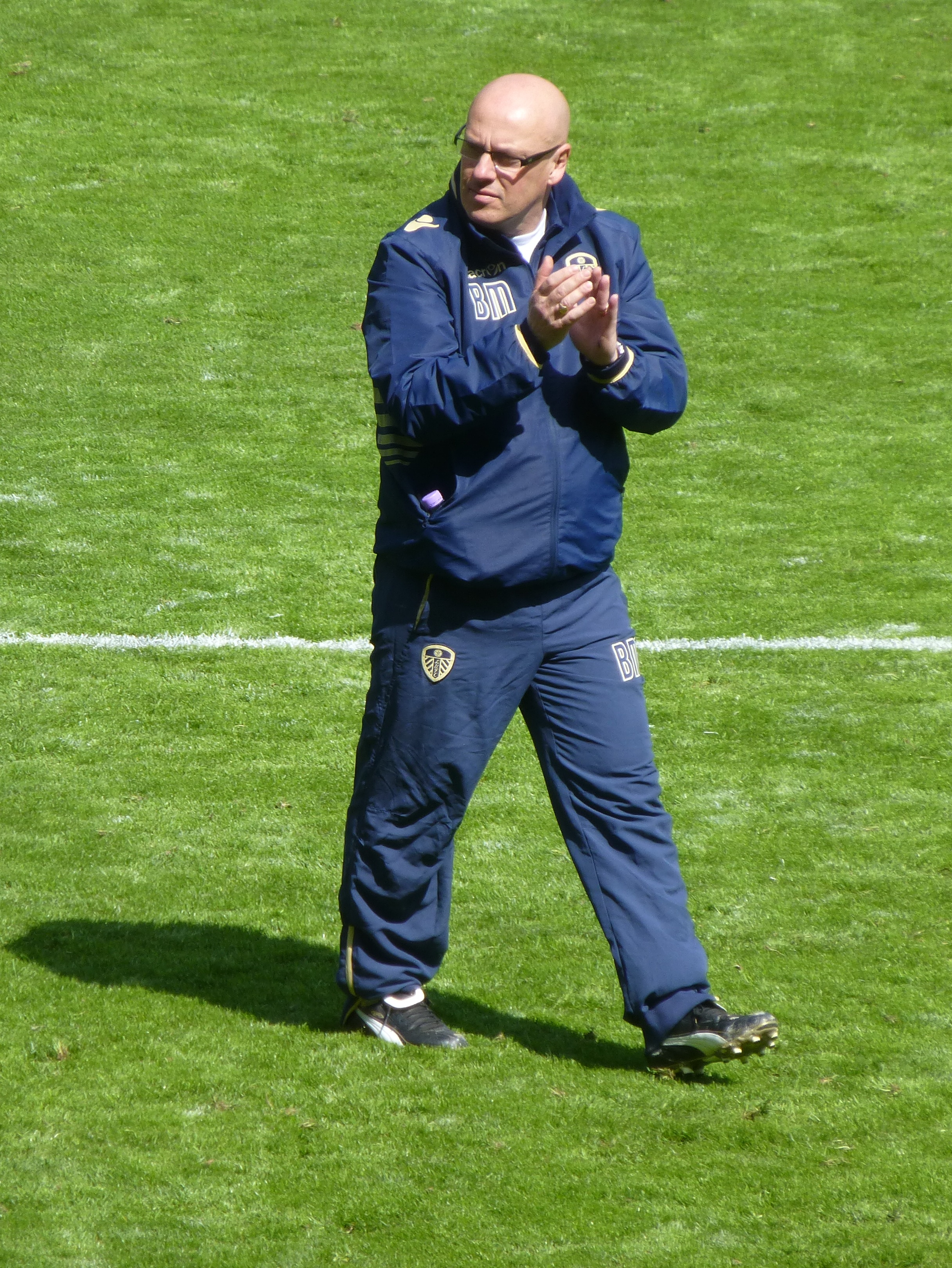
- McDermott as manager of Leeds United in 2014

Personal information
- Full name: Brian James McDermott
- Date of birth: 8 April 1961 (age 65)
- Place of birth: Slough, England
- Height: 5 ft 8 in (1.73 m)
- Position: Midfielder

Team information
- Current team: Charlotte (consultant)

Youth career
- 1977–1979: Arsenal

Senior career*
Years	Team	Apps	(Gls)
1979–1984	Arsenal	61	(12)
1983	→ Fulham (loan)	3	(0)
1984	→ IFK Norrköping (loan)	17	(5)
1984–1987	Oxford United	24	(2)
1986	→ Huddersfield Town (loan)	4	(1)
1986	→ Djurgårdens IF (loan)	12	(2)
1987–1988	Cardiff City	51	(8)
1988–1990	Exeter City	68	(4)
1990–1992	Yeovil Town	62	(12)
1992–1993	South China	10	(2)
1993–1995	STAMCO	73	(37+)
1995	Slough Town	6	(0)
Total		308	(46)

International career
1979	England U18	7	(3)

Managerial career
- 1996–1998: Slough Town
- 1998–2000: Woking
- 2009–2013: Reading
- 2013–2014: Leeds United
- 2015–2016: Reading
- * Club domestic league appearances and goals

Brian James McDermott (born 8 April 1961) is a former professional football player and coach. He is currently a consultant at Major League Soccer club Charlotte.

Born in Slough to Irish parents, McDermott joined Arsenal as an apprentice in 1977 and went on to play for Fulham, IFK Norrköping, Oxford United, Huddersfield Town, Cardiff City, Exeter City and Yeovil Town in a 14-year playing career during the 1980s and 1990s. At IFK Norrköping he was named Sweden's Player of the Year in 1984. He finished his playing career at Slough Town in 1995. The following season, he became manager of Slough Town where he had a very successful few years in the Conference.

Following the sacking of Brendan Rodgers, McDermott was appointed manager of Reading. In his first season as manager of Reading he led them into the quarter-finals of the FA Cup for the first time in 83 years, a run that included knocking out Liverpool at Anfield. The following season, he repeated the feat, this time with an away win over Liverpool's city rivals Everton. McDermott led Reading to a Championship playoff final, where they lost to Swansea City; the following season Reading were promoted to the Premier League after winning the Championship. On 11 March 2013, McDermott was sacked with the club in 19th place. McDermott made a swift return to management, replacing Neil Warnock at Leeds United. He left the post by mutual consent on 27 May 2014.

After a second stint as Reading manager, McDermott has worked as a scout for Arsenal and then joined Hibernian as their director of football in May 2023.

== Playing career ==
Born in Slough, Buckinghamshire, McDermott joined Arsenal as an apprentice in January 1977, signing professional forms with the club in February 1979. He was a regular in Arsenal's reserve team, finishing as top scorer in the Football Combination in 1978–79, before making his début as a substitute against Bristol City on 10 March 1979. He did not properly break into the Arsenal first team until the 1980–81 season, notching 45 appearances (14 as sub) in all competitions in that season and 1981–82.

Unable to match his goalscoring rate at the top level, he featured much less in the 1982–83 and 1983–84 seasons and was loaned out twice by the Gunners: once to Fulham in 1983 and then to IFK Norrköping between April and October 1984, where he was named Sweden's Player of the Year. McDermott secured a permanent move to Oxford United in December 1984, having made 72 appearances (44 starts, 28 as sub) for Arsenal, scoring 13 goals.

McDermott's later career included a loan spell at Huddersfield Town and at Djurgårdens IF, before stints at Cardiff City, Exeter City and Yeovil Town.

After a spell in Hong Kong for club South China, McDermott returned to England to play in the Sussex County League with STAMCO while working at Slough Town as Football in the Community Officer. He then played briefly for Slough Town before subsequently managing the club.

== Coaching and managerial career ==
=== Slough Town ===
McDermott joined Slough Town, initially as a player in 1995; however, he took up a player manager role with the club following the departure of then manager, Dave Russell, in March 1996. Slough finished the 1995–96 season in 17th place in the Conference. McDermott then went on to have two full seasons as manager of Slough, finishing the 1996–97 season in 16th place and then the 1997–98 season in 8th place. In the summer of 1998 the consortium which had bought the club out of receivership seven years earlier decided that they were not prepared to pay for ground improvements required to remain in the Conference and therefore the club was demoted back to the Isthmian League, all but 4 of the club's players were sacked due to financial constraints, including manager Brian McDermott.

=== Woking ===
After leaving Slough Town in the summer of 1998, McDermott took the managers job at Woking in September 1998, with his first match in charge ending in a draw versus Yeovil Town. However, due to a poor 1999–2000 season and with Woking struggling in 20th place in the table Brian McDermott was sacked by Woking on 29 February 2000.

=== Reading ===
McDermott joined Alan Pardew's Reading as Chief Scout in September 2000, taking over from Maurice Evans. McDermott also became the under-19s and reserve team manager, before taking over as caretaker first team manager following the departure of Brendan Rodgers on 17 December 2009.

McDermott's first game in charge was a 1–1 draw at Bristol City with Simon Church grabbing a 90th-minute equaliser for the Royals.

On 2 January 2010 McDermott's Reading took on Premier League side Liverpool in the FA Cup third round, taking the lead through Simon Church before Steven Gerrard equalised for Liverpool. The game ended in a 1–1 draw, earning the Royals a replay at Anfield on 13 January, during which Reading came from 1–0 down to win 2–1 after extra time thanks to a penalty from Gylfi Sigurðsson in stoppage time after 90 minutes and a header in extra time from Shane Long. This was McDermott's first victory in charge of Reading and the first ever for the club at Anfield.

The Royals went on to beat Premier League side Burnley 1–0 thanks to a late strike from Gylfi Sigurðsson to secure a place in the FA Cup fifth round.

On 27 January 2010 McDermott signed a 12-month rolling contract to become Reading's full-time manager. After that he led the Royals on a four-match winning streak in the league and into the quarter-finals of the FA Cup for the first time in 83 years after a 3–2 win over West Bromwich Albion. McDermott was nominated for Manager of the Month for February and won it in March.

McDermott oversaw another exciting FA Cup run in 2010–11, with victories over Premier League clubs West Brom and Everton before narrowly losing to eventual FA Cup winners Manchester City. In the Championship, the Royals recovered from a poor start to finish in 5th and secure a place in the Play-offs. After a goalless first leg at the Madejski Stadium, striker Shane Long scored twice in a 3–0 win at Cardiff to give Reading a trip to Wembley for the Play-off Final on 30 May 2011, where his team lost 4–2 to Swansea City, managed by his old colleague, Brendan Rodgers.

The following season, on 17 April 2012, McDermott guided Reading to Premier League promotion with a 1–0 win against Nottingham Forest after a superb run of 15 wins in 17 games. On 14 May 2012, McDermott was named as the League Managers Association Championship Manager of the Year at the League Managers Association Awards.

McDermott took charge of his first top flight match as Reading manager on 18 August 2012, drawing 1–1 at home to Stoke.

On Tuesday 30 October 2012, Reading were involved in an extraordinary League Cup match against Arsenal at the Madejski Stadium. Reading were 4–0 up after 35 minutes, but lost the tie 7–5 after extra time. After the match McDermott said: "It was kamikaze football. It's the worst defeat of my career."

McDermott led Reading to their first Premier League win of the 2012–13 season on 17 November 2012 at the eleventh attempt, defeating Everton 2–1 at home.

On 6 February 2013, McDermott was named Premier League Manager of the Month for January after guiding his side to victories over West Bromwich Albion and Newcastle United as well as a hard-fought draw with then third place Chelsea.

On 11 March 2013, despite his success in January, McDermott was sacked from his position at Reading by owner Anton Zingarevich after a run of four successive league defeats.

=== Leeds United ===
Following the departure of Neil Warnock in April 2013, Brian McDermott took over as manager of Leeds United on 12 April 2013 on a 3-year contract, with assistant manager Nigel Gibbs joining him at the club.

McDermott stated that he would have initially waited until Summer 2013 to resume his managerial career but due to the status and position of the club decided to take charge with 5 games left of the 2012–13 season. His first match in charge was against Sheffield Wednesday on 13 April 2013 which resulted in a 2–1 win for Leeds at Elland Road.

By coincidence, the head coach of the high-profile local professional rugby league team, Leeds Rhinos was also called Brian McDermott.

In the summer of 2013 McDermott updated the squad with £1 million midfielder Luke Murphy from Crewe Alexandra, and defender Scott Wootton from Manchester United. He further added to this by completing several free transfers including forwards Noel Hunt and Matt Smith in July, and Lithuanian international defender Marius Žaliūkas in late October. However, McDermott stuck with largely the same squad from the previous season. McDermott's side began the season slowly with a succession of draws and losses; however, a surge of form through October to December saw Leeds reach a high of 5th place in the table, consistently among the playoff places. A sharp loss of form quickly followed though, with a five match losing streak through late December and January, (including a surprise FA Cup loss to Rochdale and a 6–0 derby loss to Sheffield Wednesday) seeing Brian McDermott's side drop to 12th place.

==== Massimo Cellino takeover ====
In January 2014 speculation grew that Leeds would be subject to takeover by Italian entrepreneur and Cagliari owner Massimo Cellino. A delegation representing Cellino was seen at Elland Road and the Thorp Arch training ground several times, and on 28 January it was reported that Cellino had asked for his associate and former Middlesbrough defender Gianluca Festa to sit in the dugout for Leeds' 1–1 draw with Ipswich.

On 31 January it was reported that McDermott had been sacked as manager of the club, with Gianluca Festa speculated in the media to be his most likely replacement. The following day reports emerged suggesting Gulf Finance House club directors were attempting to reinstate McDermott as manager, saying the Cellino family (the club's prospective new owners) had no authority to dismiss him. In an interview in December 2023, Cellino revealed he had asked for the couch to be replaced not the coach and he had been misunderstood.

On 1 February, McDermott's Elland Road assistant Nigel Gibbs was named as caretaker manager for the club's home derby against Huddersfield Town. Following the game, the club released an official statement saying McDermott had not been dismissed and remained first team manager.

On 3 February, McDermott returned to the club and carried out first team training and a press conference announcing he had been reinstated after seemingly being sacked on 31 January by a lawyer. McDermott proclaimed his love for the club and said the fans support for him in the 5–1 win against Huddersfield Town meant that he wanted to return to the role despite the uncertainty. Speculation over his long-term future remained with the prospective takeover by Cellino still to be approved by the Football League.

McDermott also revealed in his press conference that prospective new head coach Gianluca Festa had changed the starting line-up he had picked on 31 January for the fixture the following day against Huddersfield, only for the team to then be changed back again to the original starting line-up on Saturday by McDermott's assistant manager Nigel Gibbs. McDermott said that on 3 February Festa was still present in training, however, this time acting as a translator for new signing Andrea Tabanelli. Tabanelli was signed in the window between McDermott's 'sacking' and his reinstatement. McDermott revealed that the move was under scrutiny by the Football League as to see if the players signed would be sanctioned.

On 7 February 2014, it was released that Tabanelli's transfer to Leeds had been cancelled as the signing "did not comply with Football League regulations" and he returned to Cagliari, the same day Leeds had announced that they had exchanged contracts for the sale of Leeds to Cellino's family consortium Eleonora Sport Ltd. The deal saw the Cellino family acquire a 75% ownership of the club subject to Football League approval.

In February 2014, McDermott saw his first team boosted with the signings of Jack Butland and Connor Wickham, McDermott revealed that he had been in consultation with Cellino regarding the two high-profile signings.

After Leeds finished the season in a disappointing 15th place, on 14 May, in an interview with ITV, president Cellino questioned McDermott's decision to take a holiday, even proclaiming the club "have no manager", and asked "who's managing this club? Brian, where's Brian?" On the same day it was revealed that the retain and release list of players would be handled by Cellino and Benito Carbone and not McDermott, the academy players decision would be made by Neil Redfearn. On 15 May, Leeds confirmed Carbone's position at the club in a statement on the club's official website on 15 May, they confirmed that Carbone "will be involved with all football matters, including both the first team and the Academy".

On 30 May 2014, McDermott and Leeds United parted company with owner Cellino stating that he wanted a fresh approach, with a head coach rather than a manager. On 16 June, McDermott was succeeded as Leeds manager by Dave Hockaday who took up the role in a head coach capacity.

=== Arsenal scout ===
On 6 October 2014, McDermott joined Premier League side Arsenal as chief scout until 17 December 2015 when he took the Reading manager's job.

=== Reading return ===
On 17 December 2015, and after weeks of speculation, McDermott returned to his former club as their new manager. Six months later, on 27 May 2016, McDermott was sacked.

=== Later career ===
McDermott returned to his scouting role with Arsenal in June 2016, and remained in the role until the club announced a round of redundancies in August 2020. He then worked as a consultant for various organisations, including the League Managers' Association, before he was appointed director of football at Scottish club Hibernian in May 2023.

In November 2025, he joined Major League Soccer club Charlotte as a consultant.

== Personal life ==
McDermott was born to Irish parents. In an interview in 2012, he revealed he was a supporter of Sligo Rovers and that one of his goals was to manage the Republic of Ireland national side one day. In 2022, McDermott said that he had experienced challenges with alcohol and depression.

== Managerial statistics ==
As of match played 7 May 2016. Slough and Woking managerial record confirmed by Rothmans Football Yearbook.

Managerial record by team and tenure
Team	From	To	Record				
Team	From	To	P	W	D	L	Win %
Slough Town	1 March 1996	30 June 1998	125	43	38	44	34.4
Woking	18 September 1998	29 February 2000	85	38	21	26	44.7
Reading	17 December 2009	11 March 2013	169	76	43	50	45.0
Leeds United	12 April 2013	30 May 2014	54	20	9	25	37.0
Reading	17 December 2015	27 May 2016	30	9	8	13	30.0
Total			463	186	119	158	40.2

== Honours ==
=== Player ===
Oxford United

- Football League Second Division: 1984–85

Exeter City

- Football League Fourth Division: 1989–90

Individual

- Sweden Player of the Year: 1984

=== Manager ===
Reading

- Premier Reserve League South: 2006–07
- Football League Championship: 2011–12

Individual

- LMA Championship Manager of the Year: 2011–12
- Premier League Manager of the Month: January 2013
- Football League Championship Manager of the Month: March 2010, April 2011, February 2012, March 2012
