= Terry Boyle =

Welsh footballer (born 1958)

Personal information
- Full name: Terence David John Boyle
- Date of birth: 29 October 1958 (age 68)
- Place of birth: Ammanford, Wales
- Position: Defender

Youth career
- 1975: Tottenham Hotspur

Senior career*
Years	Team	Apps	(Gls)
1975–1977	Tottenham Hotspur	0	(0)
1977–1981	Crystal Palace	35	(1)
1981	→ Wimbledon (loan)	5	(1)
1981–1983	Bristol City	.47	(0)
1983–1986	Newport County	166	(11)
1986–1989	Cardiff City	168	(7)
1989–1990	Swansea City	47	(1)
1990–1993	Merthyr Tydfil	145	(?)
1993–1995	Barry Town	68	(7)
1995	Ebbw Vale	8	(0)
1995–1996	Inter Cardiff	48	(2)
1996–1997	Carmarthen Town	34	(0)
	Cinderford Town	?	(?)
2001	Bangor City	2	(0)

International career
1981	Wales U21	2	(0)
1981	Wales	2	(1)

Managerial career
- 1994: Barry Town
- 2008–2018: Wales Semi-Pro
- 2011: Neath
- 2026: Llanelli
- * Club domestic league appearances and goals

Terence David John Boyle (born 29 October 1958) is a Welsh former professional footballer. During his career, he made over 500 appearances in the Football League and made two appearances for the Wales national team in 1981.

== Early life ==
Born in Ammanford, Boyle attended Llanelli Boys' Grammar School and played for the school rugby team as a centre. He also represented Carmarthen in javelin.

== Club career ==
A former captain for Wales at schoolboy level, Boyle began his career at Tottenham Hotspur, signing apprenticeship forms in April 1975 before turning professional soon after in September 1975, making his way through the youth system. Unable to oust established players such as Mike England and Keith Osgood from the side, he did not make a first team appearance at White Hart Lane and moved to Crystal Palace. He spent four years with Palace, including a loan spell at Wimbledon before joining Bristol City in 1981 in exchange for Kevin Mabbutt.

He went on to play for Newport County, being named in the 1986 Third Division PFA Team of the Year, before joining Cardiff City in August 1986 for a tribunal set fee of £22,500. The transfer proved controversial with Newport as they had expected a significantly larger fee for Boyle, who was the club captain at the time of the move. He made over 168 appearances for the Bluebirds, including helping them win promotion to Division Three in the 1987–88 season and playing in the 1988 Welsh Cup final as Cardiff defeated Wrexham 2–0. In 1989, his former Crystal Palace teammate Ian Evans brought him to Swansea City where he had recently been appointed manager. He played 47 times in the 1989–90 season before moving on to Merthyr Tydfil in the Conference League. He later moved into the Welsh Premier League with Barry Town.

He ended his playing career with player-manager roles at Ebbw Vale, Inter Cardiff and Cinderford Town.

== International career ==
Boyle made his debut for Wales on 24 February 1981, scoring during a 3–1 victory over Republic of Ireland at Tolka Park. He made one more appearance for Wales, three months later in May 1981, when he came on as a substitute in place of Joey Jones during a 2–0 victory over Scotland.

=== International goals ===
Wales score listed first, score column indicates score after each goal.

International goals by date, venue, cap, opponent, score, result and competition
No.	Date	Venue	Opponent	Score	Result	Competition
1	24 February 1981	Tolka Park, Dublin, Ireland	Republic of Ireland	2–1	3–1	Friendly

== Coaching career ==
In August 1994, Boyle was appointed player-manager of Welsh Premier League club Barry Town but left the role in November of the same year.

Boyle works for the Football Association of Wales Trust, Pro Licence holder since 2007 and is manager of the Wales national semi-professional football team. He also previously worked as assistant manager to Tomi Morgan at Porthmadog. In June 2011, he was appointed manager of Neath following the departure of Andy Dyer, but was sacked less than six months later in November 2011, along with his assistant Peter Nicholas, following a poor run of results.

In 2012, he was appointed senior professional development coach at Aldershot Town.

He was appointed as interim manager of Llanelli in January 2026, and was appointed to role permanently in April 2026. He resigned from the role in October 2026 with the club bottom of the Cymru South.

== Honours ==
Cardiff City

- Welsh Cup: 1988

Individual

- PFA Team of the Year: 1987–88 Fourth Division
