= Steve Tupling =

English footballer

Personal information
- Full name: Stephen Tupling
- Date of birth: 11 July 1964 (age 62)
- Place of birth: Wensleydale, England
- Height: 6 ft 0 in (1.83 m)
- Position: Midfielder

Youth career
- Middlesbrough

Senior career*
Years	Team	Apps	(Gls)
1984–1985	Carlisle United	1	(0)
1984–1987	Darlington	111	(8)
1987–1988	Newport County	33	(2)
1988–1989	Cardiff City	14	(3)
1988–1989	→ Torquay United (loan)	3	(0)
1988–1989	→ Exeter City (loan)	9	(1)
1989–1992	Hartlepool United	89	(3)
1992–1993	Darlington	11	(0)
1993–199?	Gateshead		
- * Club domestic league appearances and goals

Stephen Tupling (born 11 July 1964) is an English former professional footballer who played as a midfielder in the Football League.

== Life and career ==
Tupling was born in 1964 in Wensleydale, which was then in the North Riding of Yorkshire. He began his football career with Middlesbrough, but never played league football for the club, and then played in the Football League for Carlisle United, Darlington (two spells), Newport County, Cardiff City, Torquay United, Exeter City (both on loan), and Hartlepool United. He played non-League football for Gateshead after his second spell with Darlington.

After finishing his full-time football career, Tupling became a teacher, and is now a supply teacher based in the North East of England.

=== Hartlepool United ===
Tupling made his Hartlepool United debut on 26 December 1989 in a 4–1 home win against Scarborough. In the 1989–90 season he started 26 games and scored once, in a 2–1 home win against Rochdale on 10 March 1990. The following season he started 40 league games and scored twice, in the first game of the season in a 3–2 win away at Chesterfield and in the reverse fixture in January 1991, and helped the club gain promotion from the Fourth Division. In the Third Division, Tupling started only 17 league games and did not score; his last game for Hartlepool was also the last game of the 1991–92 season, a 1–0 win at home to AFC Bournemouth.
