= Mike Ford (footballer) =

English football player and manager (born 1966)

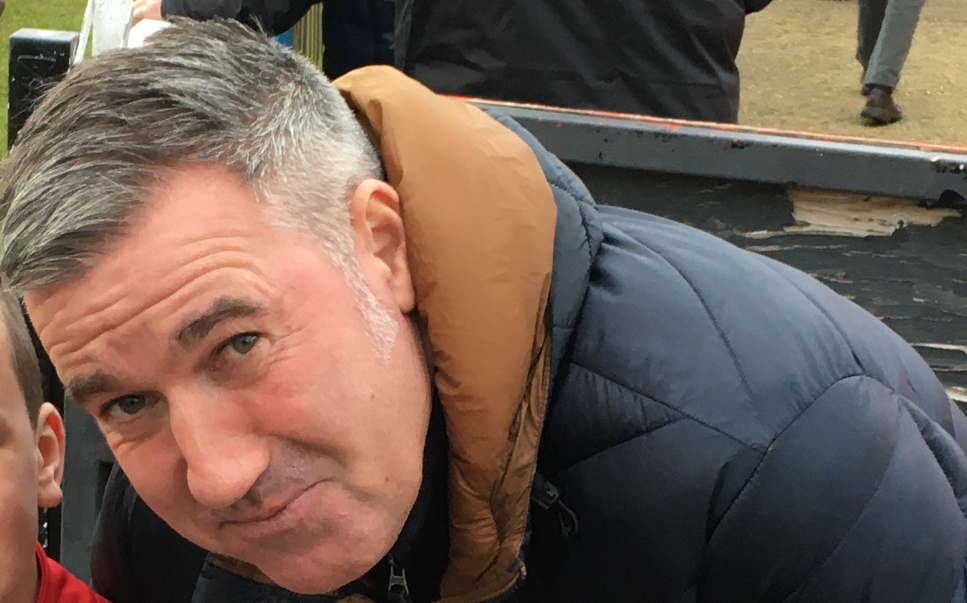
- Ford in 2019

Personal information
- Full name: Michael Paul Ford
- Date of birth: 9 February 1966 (age 60)
- Place of birth: Bristol, England
- Height: 5 ft 11 in (1.80 m)
- Position: Defender

Team information
- Current team: Evesham United (manager)

Youth career
- Leicester City

Senior career*
Years	Team	Apps	(Gls)
1984	Leicester City	0	(0)
1984	Devizes Town		
1984–1988	Cardiff City	145	(13)
1988–1998	Oxford United	289	(18)
1998–2000	Cardiff City	51	(0)
2000	Oxford United	1	(0)
2003	Thame United		

Managerial career
- 2000: Oxford United (caretaker)
- 2001: Oxford United (caretaker)
- 2009–2014: Oxford City
- 2015–2020: Banbury United
- 2021–2022: St Ives Town (co-manager)
- 2022–: Evesham United
- * Club domestic league appearances and goals

Michael Paul Ford (born 9 February 1966) is an English football manager and former professional player. His father, Tony Ford, is also a former professional footballer.

== Playing career ==
Ford began his career at Leicester City where he became a full-time professional at the age of 18. He was released by the club without making an appearance and moved to non-league side Devizes Town but he was signed a few months later by Cardiff City and quickly made his debut in a 1–1 draw with Leeds United. A mainstay in the side, Ford played in numerous positions for Cardiff in defence and midfield and helped them to promotion in his final year at the club. He signed for Oxford United in 1988 and was eventually made club captain. He spent ten years at the Manor Ground before being released in 1998 and being taken back to Ninian Park by Frank Burrows, who handed him the captaincy; he again helped Cardiff to promotion.

== Managerial career ==
During the 1999–2000 season he developed a problem with a disc in his back and was forced to retire. After his retirement he was appointed as youth team manager at Oxford and was called back into action for the team in 2000 when the team faced an injury crisis, making one appearance against Bristol City. Ford also took over as caretaker manager on two separate occasions for Oxford when they were between managers and was working as assistant manager at the club when he was fired in 2003, a decision that caused outrage among Oxford fans. After he was sacked Ford had a spell playing for non-league side Thame United.

Ford was the manager of Conference North football team Oxford City, who gained promotion in the 2011–12 season. He was also working as a football coach at the North Oxfordshire Academy teaching football skills and theory to 16- to 21-year-olds at the Academy sixth form, but is now employed by Oxford and Cherwell Valley College coaching students in the 16–19 age bracket. His team produced 3 or 4 players who helped the Oxford City first team to promotion.

On 30 April 2014, Oxford City announced that Ford would no longer be their first-team manager. After a year out of the game, in May 2015 he was appointed manager of Banbury United in the Southern League Division 1 South & West. He earned promotion to the Southern Premier Division in his first season as manager via the playoffs.

On 29 April 2020, Banbury United announced that Ford would cease to manage the club once his contract expired at the end of the month.

In the summer of 2022, he was appointed as manager of Evesham United in the Southern League Division One.
