= Steve Ketteridge =

English footballer

Personal information
- Date of birth: 7 November 1959 (age 67)
- Place of birth: Stevenage, England
- Height: 5 ft 9 in (1.75 m)
- Position: Midfielder

Youth career
- Derby County

Senior career*
Years	Team	Apps	(Gls)
1978–1985	Wimbledon	237	(32)
1981	→ Koparit (loan)	3	(0)
1985–1987	Crystal Palace	59	(6)
1987–1989	Leyton Orient	31	(1)
1988–1989	→ Cardiff City (loan)	6	(2)
1989	Barnet	8	(0)
1989–1991	Aylesbury United	?	(?)
1991–1992	St Albans City	47	(3)
1992–1998	Aylesbury United	?	(?)

Managerial career
- 1994–1996: Aylesbury United
- 1997–1998: Aylesbury United
- * Club domestic league appearances and goals

Stephen J. Ketteridge (born 7 November 1959 in Stevenage, Hertfordshire) is an English former professional footballer who played in the Football League, as a midfielder.

== Honours ==
Wimbledon

- Football League Fourth Division: 1982–83
- Football League Group Cup runner-up: 1981–82
