= Jon Roberts (footballer) =

Welsh footballer

Personal information
- Full name: Jonathan Wesley Roberts
- Date of birth: 30 December 1968 (age 57)
- Place of birth: Pontypridd, Wales
- Position: Goalkeeper

Senior career*
Years	Team	Apps	(Gls)
1987–1989	Cardiff City	9	(0)
1989–1993	Barry Town	156	(0)
1997–1998	Inter Cabletel	12	(0)
1998–2000	Barry Town	6	(0)
2000–2001	Llanelli	14	(0)
- * Club domestic league appearances and goals

Jonathan Wesley Roberts (born 30 December 1968) is a Welsh former professional footballer who played as a goalkeeper.

== Career ==
Roberts began his career with Cardiff City, progressing through the club's youth system. In November 1987, with the club's two senior goalkeepers Graham Moseley and Alan Judge unavailable, he made his senior debut in an FA Cup match against Peterborough United. After featuring in a Welsh Cup match against Ebbw Vale, Roberts made his league debut in a 2–1 victory over Newport County. He remained with the club until 1989, making nine league appearances before being released.

He signed for Barry Town following his release, where he spent four seasons as the club's first choice goalkeeper and made over 150 appearances. He later played in the Welsh Premier League for Inter Cabletel, Barry Town and Llanelli.
