= Mark Kelly (footballer, born 1966) =

English footballer

Personal information
- Full name: Mark David Kelly
- Date of birth: 7 October 1966 (age 60)
- Place of birth: Blackpool, England
- Position: Midfielder

Senior career*
Years	Team	Apps	(Gls)
1985–1987	Shrewsbury Town	0	(0)
1987–1990	Cardiff City	105	(2)
1990–1993	Fulham	64	(2)
- * Club domestic league appearances and goals

Mark David Kelly (born 7 October 1966 in Blackpool) is an English former professional footballer.

== Career ==
Kelly began his career at Shrewsbury Town, but never made a league appearance for the side. In 1987, he became Cardiff City manager Frank Burrows first signing of the season and went on to make his debut on the opening day of the season in a 1–1 draw with Leyton Orient. He appeared in a total of thirty-six matches in his first season and was a regular in the side for another two years before joining Fulham in 1990. He spent three seasons at the London club before dropping out of professional football.
