= Gareth Abraham =

Welsh footballer

Personal information
- Full name: Gareth John Abraham
- Date of birth: 13 February 1969 (age 57)
- Place of birth: Merthyr Tydfil, Wales
- Height: 6 ft 4 in (1.93 m)
- Position: Defender

Senior career*
Years	Team	Apps	(Gls)
1987–1992	Cardiff City	87	(4)
1992–1994	Hereford United	49	(2)
1994–2001	Merthyr Tydfil	?	(?)
2001–2002	Rhayader Town	15	(1)
- * Club domestic league appearances and goals

Gareth John Abraham (born 13 February 1969) is a Welsh former professional footballer who played as a defender. He made over 100 appearances in The Football League with Cardiff City and Hereford United before playing non-league football for Merthyr Tydfil and Rhayader Town.

== Career ==
Born in Merthyr Tydfil, Abraham came through the youth ranks at Cardiff City, captaining them to a Welsh Youth Cup win, before making his debut in 1987 during a 3–0 defeat to Wrexham. Three days after his debut, he scored his first goal for the club when he found the net in a 3–1 victory over Darlington but did not appear for the Bluebirds again for the rest of the season as the team won promotion from the Fourth Division. It was during the 1988–89 season that he began to establish himself in the first team but during his time at the club Cardiff found themselves hovering above relegation from the Football League.

He found himself out of the side in 1991–92 season and left the club to join Hereford United in January 1992, making his debut in a 1–1 draw with Barnet. He spent one and a half seasons with Hereford before leaving for his hometown team of Merthyr Tydfil, also working as a groundsman at the club. After spending over five years at Merthyr, Abraham spent a short time in the Welsh Premier League with Rhayader Town alongside former Cardiff teammate Cohen Griffith until the pair left the club by mutual consent in January 2002.

== Honours ==
Cardiff City

- Welsh Cup Winner: 1

1991–92
