= Nigel Stevenson =

Welsh footballer (born 1958)

Personal information
- Full name: Nigel Charles Ashley Stevenson
- Date of birth: 2 November 1958 (age 68)
- Place of birth: Swansea, Wales
- Height: 6 ft 2 in (1.88 m)
- Position: Defender

Youth career
- 1974–1975: Swansea City

Senior career*
Years	Team	Apps	(Gls)
1975–1987	Swansea City	259	(15)
1985–1986	→ Cardiff City (loan)	14	(0)
1986	→ Reading (loan)	3	(0)
1987–1989	Cardiff City	68	(2)
1989–1990	Merthyr Tydfil	?	(?)
1990–1991	Yeovil Town	18	(1)
1992–1993	Llanelli	36	(2)
1993–1994	Maesteg Park	35	(1)
1998–1999	Haverfordwest County	11	(0)

International career
- Wales U21
1982	Wales	4	(0)
- * Club domestic league appearances and goals

Nigel Charles Ashley Stevenson (born 2 November 1958) is a Welsh former international footballer.

== Club career ==
Stevenson began his career at his hometown side Swansea City, making his debut in 1976 in a match against Southport. He quickly established himself in the first team and stayed with the team throughout their rise from Division Four to Division One and their subsequent fall back down to Division Four. After reaching a decade at the club he was awarded a testimonial against Spanish side Real Sociedad, managed by his former Swansea manager John Toshack. However soon after Stevenson found himself ousted from the side and he spent time on loan at Cardiff City and Reading.

After impressing in Cardiff's battle against relegation during his loan spell at the end of the 1985–86 season, he joined the side on a permanent basis at the end of the following year on a free transfer after making over 250 appearances for Swansea City. In his first season at Ninian Park, he helped the side to win promotion to Division Three and claim the Welsh Cup. He left the following year after making just over 70 appearances, moving into non-league football with Merthyr Tydfil. He later enjoyed spells at Llanelli, Maesteg Park and Haverfordwest County.

== International career ==
During his career, Stevenson won four caps for Wales, making his international debut on 27 April 1982 in a 1–0 defeat against England. He made another three appearances in 1982, starting matches against Scotland, Northern Ireland and Norway.

== Honours ==
Cardiff City

- Division Four Runner-up: 1

1987–88

- Welsh Cup Winner: 1

1987–88
