= Paul Wimbleton =

English footballer

Personal information
- Full name: Paul Philip Wimbleton
- Date of birth: 13 November 1964 (age 61)
- Place of birth: Havant, England
- Height: 5 ft 8 in (1.73 m)
- Position: Midfielder

Senior career*
Years	Team	Apps	(Gls)
1981–1984	Portsmouth	10	(0)
1985–1986	→Barnet (loan)	12	(0)
1986–1989	Cardiff City	119	(17)
1989–1990	Bristol City	16	(2)
1990–1991	Shrewsbury Town	34	(1)
1991	→ Maidstone United (loan)	2	(1)
1991–1992	Exeter City	36	(4)
1992–1993	Swansea City	15	(1)
1993–?	Barry Town	21	(3)
- Cape Town Spurs
- Sing Tao
- Happy Valley
1995–1996	Kui Tan		
- Cork City
- Foshan Fosti
- Merthyr Tydfil
1997–1998	South Jersey Barons		(5)
1999	Delaware Wizards		
- Hampton Roads Mariners
- * Club domestic league appearances and goals

Paul Philip Wimbleton (born 13 November 1964) is an English former professional footballer who made more than 200 appearances in the Football League.

== Career ==
Born in Havant, Wimbleton was an England schoolboy international in his youth, making 10 appearances and scoring 5 goals. He began his career at Portsmouth making his debut during the 1981–82 season. At the start of the following season he sustained a serious knee injury. He attempted to return to action for the club but his injury had not fully healed and he was forced to undergo surgery. He needed a long recuperation period in order to overcome the injury and this led to his release by the club in 1984.

In July 1986 he signed for Cardiff City manager Frank Burrows, who had been Portsmouth manager for a short time when Wimbleton began to break into the first team. He was ever-present in his first year at the club, making 46 league appearances and playing a total of 59 competitive games. He finished as top scorer with eleven goals in all competitions before helping the side gain promotion, also winning the Welsh Cup. Wimbleton was voted PFA Team Player of the Year and Cardiff Player of the Year. He spent one more year at Cardiff before moving to Bristol City in 1989. He spent one year at Bristol, helping them to league promotion, and went on to have similar one year spells at Shrewsbury Town, which included a short loan spell at Maidstone United, Exeter City in 1991 and Swansea City in 1992 before moving to Barry Town.

As a Barry Town player he won the Welsh Cup for a second time before travelling to South Africa to play for Cape Town Spurs in the South African first Division. The following season 1995–1996 he went to play in the Hong Kong first Division for Sing Tao, helping them to win the Viceroy Cup. He was transferred to Kui Tan at the end of the 1995–1996 season. In the 1995–1996 season Wimbleton played for Cork City. In the summer of the 1997–1998 season, Wimbleton played for Foshan in the Chinese first Division. At the end of the 1997–1998 season Wimbleton moved again, this time playing for Merthyr Tydfil. The following season he played for the Delaware Wizards and Hampton Roads Mariners in the 'A' League in the United States where he made 19 appearances. In 1998 Wimbleton started his own soccer coaching business, Three Lions Soccer Academy, in New Jersey, United States.

== Honours ==
Individual

- PFA Team of the Year: 1987–88 Fourth Division
