= Paul Wheeler (footballer) =

Welsh footballer

Personal information
- Full name: Paul Wheeler
- Date of birth: 3 January 1965 (age 61)
- Place of birth: Caerphilly, Wales
- Height: 5 ft 11 in (1.80 m)
- Positions: Midfielder; striker

Senior career*
Years	Team	Apps	(Gls)
1983–1984	Bristol Rovers	0	(0)
1984–?	Taffs Well	1	(?)
?–1985	Aberaman	0	(1)
1985–1989	Cardiff City	101	(10)
1989	Hull City	5	(0)
1989–1991	Hereford United	54	(12)
1991–1992	Stockport County	23	(5)
1992	→ Scarborough (loan)	7	(1)
1993–1994	Chester City	40	(7)
1994–1996	Stalybridge Celtic	52	(11)
1996-c.1997	Leigh RMI	50	(0)
c.1997–?	Winsford United	2	(?)
- * Club domestic league appearances and goals

Paul Wheeler (born 3 January 1965) is a Welsh former professional footballer.

== Career ==
Born in Caerphilly, Wheeler began his career at Bristol Rovers, signing as an apprentice after being spotted by one of the clubs' scouts, Stan Montgomery, who was scouting the South Wales area. He was released after two years, having never made a league appearance for the club, and returned to Wales where he worked as a caretaker at Cyncoed College while playing Welsh league football with Taffs Well and Aberaman where he scored 31 goals.

He went on to join Cardiff City after playing well enough in a trial match for manager Alan Durban to offer him a full contract. He quickly became a regular in the side and made his first league appearance against derby county in Division 2, suffering relegation in his first year before helping them to a promotion during the 1987–88 season and winning the Welsh Cup. He was released by the club in 1989 and joined Hull City on non-contract terms before having spells at Hereford United and Stockport County where he played at Wembley twice in the Autoglass final and the Division 3 playoffs before ending his league career with Chester City. They were relegated in 1992–93 but their promotion season from Division Three the following year included a hat–trick in a 4–0 win at Mansfield Town. He left the club at the end of the season.

He then moved into non-league football with Stalybridge Celtic, Leigh RMI and Winsford United.

== Honours ==
Stockport County

- Associate Members' Cup runner-up: 1991–92
