= Jimmy Gilligan =

English footballer (born 1964)

Personal information
- Full name: James Martin Gilligan
- Date of birth: 24 January 1964 (age 62)
- Place of birth: Hammersmith, England
- Height: 6 ft 2 in (1.88 m)
- Position: Striker

Youth career
- 1978–1981: Watford

Senior career*
Years	Team	Apps	(Gls)
1981–1985	Watford	27	(6)
1982	→ Lincoln City (loan)	3	(0)
1985–1986	Grimsby Town	24	(4)
1986–1987	Swindon Town	17	(5)
1986	→ Newport County (loan)	5	(1)
1987	Lincoln City	11	(1)
1987–1989	Cardiff City	99	(35)
1989–1990	Portsmouth	32	(5)
1990–1993	Swansea City	62	(23)

International career
1981	England Youth	3	(0)

Managerial career
- 1991–1999: Watford (youth coach)
- 1999–2001: Nottingham Forest (reserves)
- 2003–2005: Milton Keynes Dons (assistant manager)
- 2011–2014: Nike Football Academy
- 2014–2016: Nottingham Forest (first team coach)
- 2018–2020: Nottingham Forest (U23 lead coach)
- * Club domestic league appearances and goals

James Martin Gilligan (born 24 January 1964) is an English former professional footballer. He is at Norwich City as the new Football development director and has also coached at Nottingham Forest, Wimbledon, Milton Keynes Dons and with The FA. He holds a UEFA Pro License.

His son Ryan Gilligan is also a professional footballer.

== Playing career ==
Born in Hammersmith, Gilligan later moved to Stevenage. He started his career as an apprentice at Watford after joining the club at the age of thirteen. He was spotted playing for a Hertfordshire FA XI by Watford scout Tom Walley and a Chelsea scout. Both scouts approached his parents, who accepted Watford's offer and he signed schoolboy terms with the club following his fourteenth birthday.

He turned professional in August 1981, making a goalscoring debut against Aldershot. He helped Watford defeat Manchester United to win the FA Youth Cup in 1982 whilst also gaining representative honours, appearing for the England Youth team. In October 1982, he joined Lincoln City on loan for one month in an attempt to gain first-team experience, but made only three substitute appearances during a spell he later described as "disappointing". Returning to Watford, he began making intermittent appearances for the first team, the undoubted highlight being scoring Watford's first goal in Europe in their very first game against Kaiserslautern in the 1983–1984 UEFA Cup; he would later score in the quarter final defeat to Sparta Prague. However, he never established a regular starting role in his four seasons as a professional.

Having come to Grimsby Town's attention when scoring against them in an FA Cup Fourth Round tie in January 1985, Gilligan moved to Grimsby in the August 1985 for a fee of £100,000. However, his season at Blundell Park was disappointing: he managed just six goals in the season at the club, including two in a League Cup match against York City. Grimsby cut their losses in the summer of 1986 by allowing him to move on to Swindon Town for a fee of £30,000. Once again, he struggled to make an impression and in January 1987 joined Newport County on loan before moving to Lincoln City in March 1987. Gilligan failed to fire for the Red Imps, scoring a solitary goal as Lincoln slipped to relegation from the Football League.

A fee of £17,500 saw him join Cardiff City where he enjoyed the most productive spell of his career. He scored on his debut in a 1–1 draw with Leyton Orient and went on to finish as the club's top scorer in his first year. Virtually ever present during his two years at the club he scored vital goals in several competitions including the second goal during a 2–0 Welsh Cup final victory over Wrexham and a hat-trick against Derry City in the European Cup Winners Cup.

After two defeats in the opening two games of the 1989–90 season, Cardiff's manager Frank Burrows accepted an offer to become assistant manager to John Gregory at Portsmouth. The pair soon tabled an offer of £215,000 for Gilligan which the Cardiff board readily accepted. After a year on the South Coast, Gilligan returned to South Wales to play for Swansea City before injury finished his league career. In March 1993, he resumed playing in the non-league with Boreham Wood before moving on to Stamco.

== Coaching career ==
Following his retirement, Gilligan returned to Watford, heading up their Football in the Community scheme. After spells as youth development manager and youth team manager, he was appointed Watford's assistant academy director. He left Watford in 1999 with David Platt appointing him reserve team manager at Nottingham Forest. In July 2001, following Platt's departure and the appointment of Paul Hart to the manager's position, Gilligan left his role at Nottingham Forest. A month later, he was appointed manager of Boreham Wood, succeeding Graham Roberts in the role. However, less than three months later he resigned from the role. He joined the PFA as a regional coach educator, whilst also helping out David Platt with the England U21s, before being appointed technical director at Wimbledon in February 2003. Integral to Gilligan's appointment was Stuart Murdoch whom Gilligan had forged a friendship with from his coaching days at Watford. With Wimbledon suffering financial difficulties and the move to Milton Keynes, Gilligan moved up the ranks at Milton Keynes Dons, becoming assistant manager to Murdoch. Following Murdoch's sacking in November 2004, he was placed in temporary charge. He remained in charge until the appointment of Danny Wilson in December, a move which saw Gilligan depart the Dons shortly afterwards.

=== England national team ===
In August 2007, Gilligan left his post at Thurrock to become a scout for Stuart Pearce and the England U21 team, as well as the England National Team. He played a central role in developing England's scouting structures and a modern player selection system. In May 2010 it was announced that Gilligan would take up the role of Head of Youth for Stevenage from 1 July.

=== Nike Football Academy ===
In July 2011, Gilligan moved to become head coach of the Nike Football Academy. Gilligan remained in charge of the Nike Academy for three seasons, and is widely credited with discovering and developing players who have gone on to play at the FIFA World Cup, such as Tom Rogic and Seon-Min Moon. Gilligan and his team scouted and coached over 130 players, out of whom 40 made it from amateur level to professional during this period, including Abdul Waris, David Accam, Petar Golubovic, Anfernee Dijksteel, Jorge Grant, Kevin Salazar and others. They also played competitive fixtures against Arsenal, FC Barcelona, Inter Milan and others, and grew a sizeable YouTube presence. During this period, Gilligan's coaching methods and motivational half-time talks gained publicity in media such a FourFourTwo magazine.

=== Later posts ===
In March 2014 Gilligan was appointed Lead Professional Development Coach at Nottingham Forest. In July 2015, Gilligan progressed to take charge of first team coaching and spent some time in charge of first team affairs as caretaker. After a spell at The FA as national coach educator, he returned to Forest as U23 Lead Coach.

In June 2019, he gained the UEFA Pro License, the highest coaching qualification, from The FA, having completed the course alongside Steven Gerrard and Peter Schmeichel.

In August 2026, Gilligan was named as Norwich City's new football development director.
