= 1994–95 Cardiff City F.C. season =

Welsh football club season

Cardiff City
1994–95 season
- Owner: Rick Wright
- Manager: Eddie May/Terry Yorath/Eddie May
- Football League Second Division: 22nd
- FA Cup: 1st round
- League Cup: 1st round
- Welsh Cup: Runners-up
- Auto Windscreens Shield: 2nd round
- Top goalscorer: League: Phil Stant (13); All: Phil Stant (15)
- Highest home attendance: 7,420 (v Birmingham, 28 December 1994)
- Lowest home attendance: 2,560 (v Bradford City, 28 March 1995)
- Average home league attendance: 4,543

The 1994–95 season was Cardiff City F.C.'s 68th season in the Football League. They competed in the 24-team Division Two, then the third tier of English football, finishing twenty-second, suffering relegation to Division Three.

After three months of the season, manager Eddie May was sacked from his position and replaced by Terry Yorath. However Yorath's spell in charge saw the side plummet to the bottom of the table and Yorath was also sacked and remarkably replaced by the man he took over from in Eddie May.

== Players ==
First team squad. Note: Flags indicate national team as defined under FIFA eligibility rules; some limited exceptions apply. Players may hold more than one non-FIFA nationality.

No.	Pos.	Nation	Player
--	GK	ENG	David Williams
--	GK	WAL	Steve Williams
--	DF	WAL	Mark Aizlewood
--	DF	WAL	Lee Baddeley
--	DF	IRL	Derek Brazil
--	DF	WAL	Terry Evans
--	DF	ENG	Chris Honor
--	DF	CAN	Ian McLean
--	DF	WAL	Jason Perry
--	DF	ENG	Andy Scott
--	DF	WAL	Damon Searle
--	DF	WAL	Scott Young
--	MF	ENG	Wayne Fereday
--	MF	GUY	Cohen Griffith

No.	Pos.	Nation	Player
--	MF	WAL	Ryan Nicholls
--	MF	ENG	Nick Richardson
--	MF	ENG	Charlie Oatway
--	MF	WAL	Danny Street
--	MF	WAL	Leigh Vick
--	MF	WAL	Nathan Wigg
--	MF	ENG	Darren Adams
--	FW	WAL	Tony Bird
--	FW	WAL	Carl Dale
--	FW	WAL	Andy Evans
--	FW	ENG	Paul Milsom
--	FW	ENG	John Pearson
--	FW	ENG	Phil Stant
--	FW	ENG	Garry Thompson

== Standings ==
Pos	Team	Pld	W	D	L	GF	GA	GD	Pts	Promotion or relegation
20	Cambridge United (R)	46	11	15	20	52	69	−17	48	Relegation to the Third Division
21	Plymouth Argyle (R)	46	12	10	24	45	83	−38	46	Relegation to the Third Division
22	Cardiff City (R)	46	9	11	26	46	74	−28	38	Relegation to the Third Division
23	Chester City (R)	46	6	11	29	37	84	−47	29	Relegation to the Third Division
24	Leyton Orient (R)	46	6	8	32	30	75	−45	26	Relegation to the Third Division

(R) Relegated

=== Results by round ===
Round	1	2	3	4	5	6	7	8	9	10	11	12	13	14	15	16	17	18	19	20	21	22	23	24	25	26	27	28	29	30	31	32	33	34	35	36	37	38	39	40	41	42	43	44	45	46
Ground	A	H	A	H	H	A	A	H	A	H	H	A	H	A	A	H	A	H	A	H	A	H	A	H	H	H	A	A	A	H	A	H	A	H	A	A	A	H	H	H	H	A	H	A	H	A
Result	L	L	D	D	D	L	W	L	L	L	L	D	W	W	L	W	L	L	L	D	W	L	L	L	L	D	L	L	L	W	L	D	L	L	D	W	D	L	W	W	D	L	L	L	L	D
Position	~	~	19	19	21	21	19	21	22	22	22	22	22	19	21	19	20	20	20	21	19	20	20	21	21	21	21	22	22	22	22	22	22	22	22	22	22	22	22	21	22	22	22	22	22	22
Points	0	0	1	2	3	3	6	6	6	6	6	7	10	13	13	16	16	16	16	17	20	20	20	20	20	21	21	21	21	24	24	25	25	25	26	29	30	30	33	36	37	37	37	37	37	38

A = Away; H = Home; W = Win; D = Draw; L = Loss

== Fixtures and results ==
=== Second Division ===
13 August 1994 1	Stockport County	4–1	Cardiff City	Stockport
	Peter Ward 14'; Kevin Francis 47', 51'; Alun Armstrong 57'; Mike Flynn (red card) 90'	Stockport report	30' Phil Stant; (red card) 26' Jason Perry; (red card) 90' Phil Stant	Stadium: Edgeley Park; Attendance: 5,139; Referee: Kevin Lynch

20 August 1994 2	Cardiff City	1–3	Oxford United	Cardiff
15:00	Phil Stant 7'		29', 35', 57' Paul Moody	Stadium: Ninian Park; Attendance: 7,281; Referee: ME Pierce

27 August 1994 3	York City	1–1	Cardiff City	York
15:00	Paul Barnes 71'		79' Paul Millar	Stadium: Bootham Crescent; Attendance: 2,861; Referee: KJ Breen (Liverpool)

30 August 1994 4	Cardiff City	0–0	Wrexham	Cardiff
19:30		Wrexham report		Stadium: Ninian Park; Attendance: 4,903; Referee: Ken Leach

3 September 1994 5	Cardiff City	1–1	Swansea City	Cardiff
11:00	Nick Richardson		Martin Hayes	Stadium: Ninian Park; Attendance: 5,523

10 September 1994 6	Blackpool	2–1	Cardiff City	Blackpool
	Phil Brown; Tony Ellis (pen.)		Nick Richardson	Stadium: Bloomfield Road; Attendance: 4,189

13 September 1994 7	Chester City	0–2	Cardiff City	Chester
			Phil Stant; Mark Aizlewood	Stadium: Deva Stadium; Attendance: 1,671

17 September 1994 8	Cardiff City	0–1	Plymouth Argyle	Cardiff
15:00			Steve Castle	Stadium: Ninian Park; Attendance: 5,674

24 September 1994 9	Bournemouth	3–2	Cardiff City	Bournemouth
	Russell Beardsmore; Russell Beardsmore (pen.); Warren Aspinall		Andy Scott; Mark Aizlewood	Stadium: Dean Court; Attendance: 3,177

1 October 1994 10	Cardiff City	1–2	Peterborough United	Cardiff
15:00	Wayne Fereday		Brian McGorry; Ken Charlery	Stadium: Ninian Park; Attendance: 4,225

8 October 1994 11	Cardiff City	1–2	Crewe Alexandra	Cardiff
15:00	Phil Stant		Ashley Ward; Rob Edwards	Stadium: Ninian Park; Attendance: 4,126

15 October 1994 12	Bristol Rovers	2–2	Cardiff City	Bath, Somerset
	Justin Channing; Billy Clark		Nick Richardson; Paul Millar	Stadium: Twerton Park; Attendance: 3,936

22 October 1994 13	Cardiff City	3–1	Cambridge United	Cardiff
15:00	Phil Stant; Phil Stant; Phil Stant		Andy Jeffrey	Stadium: Ninian Park; Attendance: 3,580

30 October 1994 14	Bradford City	2–3	Cardiff City	Bradford
	Shaun Murray; Jason Perry (o.g.)		Paul Millar (pen.) Paul Millar; Phil Stant	Stadium: Valley Parade; Attendance: 5,937

1 November 1994 15	Leyton Orient	2–0	Cardiff City	Leyton Orient
	Darren Purse; Colin West			Stadium: Brisbane Road; Attendance: 2,558

5 November 1994 16	Cardiff City	3–0	Brighton & Hove Albion	Cardiff
15:00	Lee Baddeley; Phil Stant; Phil Stant			Stadium: Ninian Park; Attendance: 5,004

19 November 1994 17	Wycombe Wanderers	3–1	Cardiff City	High Wycombe
	Keith Ryan; Keith Ryan; Tony Hemmings		Phil Stant	Stadium: Adams Park; Attendance: 5,391

25 November 1994 18	Cardiff City	0–2	Hull City	Cardiff
19:30			Linton Brown (pen.) Dean Windass	Stadium: Ninian Park; Attendance: 4,226

10 December 1994 19	Oxford United	1–0	Cardiff City	Oxford
	Matt Murphy			Stadium: Manor Ground; Attendance: 6,181

17 December 1994 20	Cardiff City	1–1	Stockport County	Cardiff
15:00	Carl Dale 89'	Stockport report	82' Jim Gannon	Stadium: Ninian Park; Attendance: 3,448; Referee: Rob Harris

26 December 1994 21	Shrewsbury Town	0–1	Cardiff City	Shrewsbury
			(pen.) Phil Stant	Stadium: Gay Meadow; Attendance: 4,933

28 December 1994 22	Cardiff City	0–1	Birmingham City	Cardiff
12:30			Ricky Otto	Stadium: Ninian Park; Attendance: 7,420

31 December 1994 23	Rotherham United	2–0	Cardiff City	Rotherham
15:00	Mark Monington; Ian Breckin			Stadium: Millmoor; Attendance: 3,064; Referee: J Watson

2 January 1995 24	Cardiff City	2–3	Brentford	Cardiff
15:00	Phil Stant; Tony Bird		Lee Harvey; Nicky Forster; Robert Taylor	Stadium: Ninian Park; Attendance: 5,235

7 January 1995 25	Cardiff City	0–1	Blackpool	Cardiff
15:00			Andy Watson	Stadium: Ninian Park; Attendance: 3,467

14 January 1995 26	Cardiff City	0–0	Huddersfield Town	Cardiff
15:00				Stadium: Ninian Park; Attendance: 3,808

17 January 1995 27	Cambridge United	2–0	Cardiff City	Cambridge
	Carlo Corazzin; Steve Butler (pen.)			Stadium: Abbey Stadium; Attendance: 2,460

4 February 1995 28	Hull City	4–0	Cardiff City	Hull
	Ian Ormondroyd; Ian Ormondroyd; Linton Brown; Warren Joyce			Stadium: Boothferry Park; Attendance: 3,903

18 February 1995 29	Huddersfield Town	5–1	Cardiff City	Huddersfield
	Andy Booth; Tom Cowan; Ronnie Jepson; Paul Reid; Gary Crosby		Derek Brazil	Stadium: Leeds Road; Attendance: 10,035

21 February 1995 30	Cardiff City	2–0	Wycombe Wanderers	Cardiff
19:30	Carl Dale; Nick Richardson			Stadium: Ninian Park; Attendance: 3,024

25 February 1995 31	Peterborough United	2–1	Cardiff City	Peterborough
	Ken Charlery; Ken Charlery		Carl Dale	Stadium: London Road; Attendance: 4,226

4 March 1995 32	Cardiff City	1–1	Bournemouth	Cardiff
15:00	Carl Dale		Steve Fletcher	Stadium: Ninian Park; Attendance: 3,008

7 March 1995 33	Swansea City	4–1	Cardiff City	Swansea
	John Williams; David Penney; Colin Pascoe; Shaun Chapple		Nathan Wigg	Stadium: Vetch Field; Attendance: 3,942

11 March 1995 34	Cardiff City	1–2	York City	Cardiff
15:00	Cohen Griffith		Glenn Naylor; Glenn Naylor	Stadium: Ninian Park; Attendance: 2,689

15 March 1995 35	Brighton & Hove Albion	0–0	Cardiff City	Brighton
				Stadium: Goldstone Ground; Attendance: 6,956

18 March 1995 36	Wrexham	0–3	Cardiff City	Wrexham
15:00		Wrexham report	25' Ryan Nicholls; 55' Cohen Griffith; 90' (o.g.) Tony Humes	Stadium: The Racecourse; Attendance: 3,023; Referee: Paul Harrison

25 March 1995 37	Plymouth Argyle	0–0	Cardiff City	Plymouth
				Stadium: Home Park; Attendance: 5,611

28 March 1995 38	Cardiff City	2–4	Bradford City	Cardiff
19:30	Perry; Paul Millar		Neil Tolson; Neil Tolson; Shaun Murray; Paul Showler	Stadium: Ninian Park; Attendance: 2,560

1 April 1995 39	Cardiff City	2–1	Chester City	Cardiff
15:00	Carl Dale; Paul Millar		Gary Hackett	Stadium: Ninian Park; Attendance: 4,405

4 April 1995 40	Cardiff City	2–1	Leyton Orient	Cardiff
19:30	Tony Bird; Tony Bird		Scott McGleish	Stadium: Ninian Park; Attendance: 4,324

8 April 1995 41	Cardiff City	1–1	Rotherham United	Cardiff
15:00	Cohen Griffith		Nathan Peel	Stadium: Ninian Park; Attendance: 6,412

15 April 1995 42	Birmingham City	2–1	Cardiff City	Birmingham
	Paul Tait; Mark Ward (pen.)		Paul Millar	Stadium: St Andrew's; Attendance: 17,455

17 April 1995 43	Cardiff City	1–2	Shrewsbury Town	Cardiff
15:00	Tony Bird		Mark Smith; Dean Spink	Stadium: Ninian Park; Attendance: 4,677

22 April 1995 44	Brentford	2–0	Cardiff City	Brentford
	Martin Grainger (pen.); Robert Taylor			Stadium: Griffin Park; Attendance: 8,268

29 April 1995 45	Cardiff City	0–1	Bristol Rovers	Cardiff
15:00			Marcus Stewart	Stadium: Ninian Park; Attendance: 5,462

6 May 1995 46	Crewe Alexandra	0–0	Cardiff City	Crewe
15:00				Stadium: Gresty Road; Attendance: 4,382; Referee: Neale Barry (Lincolnshire)

=== League Cup ===
16 August 1994 Round 1 (First leg)	Cardiff City	1–0	Torquay United	Cardiff
19:30	Charlie Oatway			Stadium: Ninian Park; Attendance: 2,690; Referee: Bob Harris (Oxfordshire)

23 August 1994 Round 1 (Second leg)	Torquay United	4–2 (4–3 agg.)	Cardiff City	Torquay
	Gregory Goodridge; Richard Hancox; Richard Hancox; Richard Hancox		Phil Stant; Phil Stant	Stadium: Plainmoor; Attendance: 2,719

=== FA Cup ===
12 November 1994 Round 1	Enfield	1–0	Cardiff City	Enfield, London
	Gary Abbott			Stadium: Southbury Road; Attendance: 2,345

=== Welsh Cup ===
7 November 1994 Round 3	Ebbw Vale	1–1	Cardiff City	Cardiff
19:30	Goal		Paul Millar	Stadium: Ninian Park; Attendance: 1,316

22 November 1994 Round 3 (Replay)	Cardiff City	2–0	Ebbw Vale	Cardiff
19:30	Garry Thompson; Nick Richardson			Stadium: Ninian Park; Attendance: 1,343
Note: Cardiff were deemed to have fielded an ineligible player (Paul Ramsey). As a result following the threat of a court case by Cardiff, the replay was replayed.

7 February 1995 Round 3 (Replay)	Cardiff City	7–0	Ebbw Vale	Cardiff
19:30	Tony Bird; Garry Thompson; Mark Aizlewood; David Ware (o.g.); Carl Dale; Carl Dale; Carl Dale			Stadium: Ninian Park; Attendance: 700; Referee: Roger Gifford (Llanbradach)

15 February 1995 Round 4	Cardiff City	4–0	Risca United	Cardiff
19:30	Carl Dale; Carl Dale; Carl Dale; Derek Brazil			Stadium: Ninian Park; Attendance: 1,294; Referee: VJ Reed (Aberdare)

28 February 1995 Quarter Final	Llandudno	0–1	Cardiff City	Llandudno
			Carl Dale	Stadium: Maesdu Park; Attendance: 200; Referee: Brian Lawler (Holyhead)

11 April 1995 Semi Final (First leg)	Swansea City	0–1	Cardiff City	Swansea
			Paul Millar	Stadium: Vetch Field; Attendance: 2,654

2 May 1995 Semi Final (Second leg)	Cardiff City	0–0 (1–0 agg.)	Swansea City	Cardiff
19:30				Stadium: Ninian Park; Attendance: 4,227; Referee: Keith Burge (Tonypandy)

21 May 1995 Final	Wrexham	2–1	Cardiff City	Cardiff
15:00	Gary Bennett 19' (pen.), 26'	Wrexham report	78' Carl Dale	Stadium: National Stadium; Attendance: 12,810; Referee: VJ Reed (Aberdare)

=== Auto Windscreens Shield ===
27 September 1994 Round 1	Cardiff City	2–0	Plymouth Argyle	Cardiff
19:30	Cohen Griffith; Carl Dale			Stadium: Ninian Park; Attendance: 1,299; Referee: Paul Vanes (West Midlands)

15 November 1994 Round 1	Exeter City	1–1	Cardiff City	Exeter
	Jason Minett (pen.)		Scott Young	Stadium: St James Park; Attendance: 1,200; Referee: Mike Pearce (Portsmouth)

29 November 1994 Round 2	Exeter City	1–0	Cardiff City	Exeter
	Jon Brown			Stadium: St James Park; Attendance: 1,452; Referee: John Holbrook (Ludlow)

== See also ==
- List of Cardiff City F.C. seasons
