= 1995–96 Cardiff City F.C. season =

Welsh football club season

Cardiff City
1995–96 season
- Owner: Samesh Kumar
- Manager: Kenny Hibbitt/Phil Neal
- Football League Third Division: 22nd
- FA Cup: 2nd round
- League Cup: 2nd round
- Auto Windscreens Shield: 2nd round
- Top goalscorer: League: Carl Dale (21); All: Carl Dale (30)
- Highest home attendance: 7,772 (v Northampton, 19 August 1995)
- Lowest home attendance: 1,611 (v Wigan Athletic, 5 March 1996)
- Average home league attendance: 3,420

The 1995–96 season was Cardiff City F.C.'s 69th season in the Football League. They competed in the 24-team Division Three, then the fourth tier of English football, finishing twenty-second.

== Players ==
First team squad. Note: Flags indicate national team as defined under FIFA eligibility rules; some limited exceptions apply. Players may hold more than one non-FIFA nationality.

No.	Pos.	Nation	Player
--	GK	ENG	David Williams
--	GK	WAL	Steve Williams
--	DF	WAL	Lee Baddeley
--	DF	ITA	Mirko Bolesan
--	DF	IRL	Derek Brazil
--	DF	WAL	Terry Evans
--	DF	ENG	Hayden Fleming
--	DF	ENG	Alan Harper
--	DF	WAL	Lee Jarman
--	DF	WAL	Ian Jones
--	DF	ENG	Russell Osman
--	DF	WAL	Jason Perry
--	DF	ENG	Ian Rodgerson
--	DF	ENG	Andy Scott
--	DF	WAL	Damon Searle
--	DF	WAL	Scott Young
--	MF	ENG	Mickey Bennett
--	MF	ENG	Stacy Coldicott
--	MF	ENG	Gerald Dobbs

No.	Pos.	Nation	Player
--	MF	ENG	Keith Downing
--	MF	SCO	Jimmy Gardner
--	MF	ENG	Paul Harding
--	MF	WAL	Chris Ingram
--	MF	ENG	Brian McGorry
--	MF	ENG	Charlie Oatway
--	MF	IRL	Tony Scully
--	MF	ENG	Paul Shaw
--	MF	WAL	Leigh Vick
--	MF	WAL	Nathan Wigg
--	FW	ENG	Darren Adams
--	FW	WAL	Tony Bird
--	FW	WAL	Carl Dale
--	FW	WAL	Andy Evans
--	FW	ENG	Steve Flack
--	FW	WAL	Simon Haworth
--	FW	AUS	Glenn Johnson
--	FW	ENG	Tony Philliskirk

== League standings ==
Pos	Team	Pld	W	D	L	GF	GA	GD	Pts	Promotion
20	Hartlepool United	46	12	13	21	47	67	−20	49	
21	Leyton Orient	46	12	11	23	44	63	−19	47	
22	Cardiff City	46	11	12	23	41	64	−23	45	
23	Scarborough	46	8	16	22	39	69	−30	40	
24	Torquay United	46	5	14	27	30	84	−54	29	Reprived from relegation

=== Results by round ===
Round	1	2	3	4	5	6	7	8	9	10	11	12	13	14	15	16	17	18	19	20	21	22	23	24	25	26	27	28	29	30	31	32	33	34	35	36	37	38	39	40	41	42	43	44	45	46
Ground	A	H	A	H	A	H	H	A	A	H	A	H	A	H	H	A	H	A	H	A	A	H	A	H	A	H	H	A	A	H	H	A	A	H	H	A	A	H	H	A	A	H	A	H	H	A
Result	D	L	D	L	W	D	W	L	L	W	L	D	W	L	L	D	L	W	W	D	L	D	L	D	L	W	W	L	L	L	W	D	L	W	L	L	L	L	D	L	L	D	D	L	W	L
Position	~	~	15	22	15	15	14	17	20	15	19	19	15	19	19	21	22	18	15	14	14	17	17	17	20	19	16	17	21	21	20	20	21	16	18	18	19	21	22	22	22	22	22	22	22	22
Points	1	1	2	2	5	6	9	9	9	12	12	13	16	16	16	17	17	20	23	24	24	25	25	26	26	29	32	32	32	32	35	36	36	39	39	39	39	39	40	40	40	41	42	42	45	45

A = Away; H = Home; W = Win; D = Draw; L = Loss

== Fixtures and results ==
=== Third Division ===
12 August 1995 1	Rochdale	3–3	Cardiff City	Rochdale
	Steve Whitehall; Steve Whitehall (pen.); Dave Thompson		Tony Bird; Tony Bird; Carl Dale	Stadium: Spotland; Attendance: 2,321

19 August 1995 2	Cardiff City	0–1	Northampton Town	Cardiff
19:30			Dean Peer	Stadium: Ninian Park; Attendance: 7,772; Referee: Graham Barber (Warwick)

26 August 1995 3	Doncaster Rovers	0–0	Cardiff City	Doncaster
				Stadium: Belle Vue; Attendance: 2,186

29 August 1995 4	Cardiff City	0–1	Exeter City	Cardiff
19:30			Richard Pears	Stadium: Ninian Park; Attendance: 4,444

2 September 1995 5	Darlington	0–1	Cardiff City	Darlington
			(pen.) Carl Dale	Stadium: Feethams; Attendance: 1,895

9 September 1995 6	Cardiff City	0–0	Torquay United	Cardiff
15:00				Stadium: Ninian Park; Attendance: 4,318; Referee: Mick Fletcher (Warley)

12 September 1995 7	Cardiff City	2–1	Scarborough	Cardiff
19:30	Mark Todd (o.g.); Carl Dale		Steve Charles	Stadium: Ninian Park; Attendance: 2,390; Referee: Paul Rejer (Tipton)

16 September 1995 8	Gillingham	1–0	Cardiff City	Gillingham
15:00	Leo Fortune-West 35'	Gillingham report		Stadium: Priestfield Stadium; Attendance: 5,314; Referee: Alan Wiley (Walsall)

23 September 1995 9	Hartlepool United	2–1	Cardiff City	Hartlepool
	Kenny Lowe 45'; Kenny Lowe 90'		10' (pen.) Carl Dale	Stadium: Victoria Park; Attendance: 2,172

30 September 1995 10	Cardiff City	3–0	Mansfield Town	Cardiff
15:00	Chris Ingram; Carl Dale; Carl Dale (pen.)			Stadium: Ninian Park; Attendance: 3,468; Referee: Ken (KA) Leach (Wolverhampton)

7 October 1995 11	Cambridge United	4–2	Cardiff City	Cambridge
	Carlo Corazzin; Carlo Corazzin; Jody Craddock; David Adekola		Darren Adams; Tony Bird	Stadium: Abbey Stadium; Attendance: 2,648

14 October 1995 12	Cardiff City	1–1	Barnet	Cardiff
15:00	Carl Dale		Mark Cooper	Stadium: Ninian Park; Attendance: 3,342; Referee: Guy Stretton (West Bridgford)

21 October 1995 13	Lincoln City	0–1	Cardiff City	Lincoln
			Jimmy Gardner	Stadium: Sincil Bank; Attendance: 2,453

28 October 1995 14	Cardiff City	1–2	Colchester United	Cardiff
15:00	Darren Adams 30'		13' Tony Adcock; 14' Tony Adcock	Stadium: Ninian Park; Attendance: 3,207; Referee: Jim Rushton (Stoke)

31 October 1995 15	Cardiff City	0–1	Scunthorpe United	Cardiff
19:30			Andy McFarlane	Stadium: Ninian Park; Attendance: 2,159; Referee: Rob Harris (Oxford)

4 November 1995 16	Plymouth Argyle	0–0	Cardiff City	Plymouth
				Stadium: Home Park; Attendance: 7,434

18 November 1995 17	Cardiff City	0–1	Bury	Cardiff
15:00			David Johnson	Stadium: Ninian Park; Attendance: 3,846

26 November 1995 18	Hereford United	1–3	Cardiff City	Hereford
	Steve White		Carl Dale; Carl Dale; Darren Adams	Stadium: Edgar Street; Attendance: 3,521

9 December 1995 19	Cardiff City	2–0	Hartlepool United	Cardiff
15:00	Carl Dale 43'; Carl Dale 57'			Stadium: Ninian Park; Attendance: 2,934; Referee: Gurnam Singh (Wolverhampton)

16 December 1995 20	Mansfield Town	1–1	Cardiff City	Mansfield
	Steve Parkin		Damon Searle	Stadium: Field Mill; Attendance: 2,212

19 December 1995 21	Fulham	4–2	Cardiff City	Fulham
	Danny Bolt (pen.); Paul Harding (o.g.); Michael Mison; Simon Morgan		Carl Dale; Ian Rodgerson	Stadium: Craven Cottage; Attendance: 2,284

26 December 1995 22	Cardiff City	0–0	Chester City	Cardiff
15:00				Stadium: Ninian Park; Attendance: 6,521; Referee: Gurnam Singh (Wolverhampton)

1 January 1996 23	Preston North End	5–0	Cardiff City	Preston
	Simon Davey; Mickey Brown; Andy Saville; Andy Saville; Graeme Atkinson			Stadium: Deepdale; Attendance: 8,346

6 January 1996 24	Cardiff City	0–0	Leyton Orient	Cardiff
15:00				Stadium: Ninian Park; Attendance: 2,873

13 January 1996 25	Northampton Town	1–0	Cardiff City	Northampton
	Gordon Armstrong			Stadium: Sixfields Stadium; Attendance: 4,454

20 January 1996 26	Cardiff City	1–0	Rochdale	Cardiff
15:00	Jimmy Gardner			Stadium: Ninian Park; Attendance: 2,248

3 February 1996 27	Cardiff City	3–2	Doncaster Rovers	Cardiff
13:00	Carl Dale; Carl Dale; Carl Dale		Graeme Jones; Scott Colcombe	Stadium: Ninian Park; Attendance: 2,566

10 February 1996 28	Leyton Orient	4–1	Cardiff City	Leyton Orient
	Colin West; Colin West; Colin West (pen.); Alex Inglethorpe		Tony Philliskirk	Stadium: Brisbane Road; Attendance: 3,564

17 February 1996 29	Scarborough	1–0	Cardiff City	Scarborough
	Andy Toman			Stadium: Athletic Ground; Attendance: 1,414

20 February 1996 30	Cardiff City	0–2	Darlington	Cardiff
19:30			Mark Barnard; Robbie Blake	Stadium: Ninian Park; Attendance: 2,225

24 February 1996 31	Cardiff City	2–0	Gillingham	Cardiff
15:00	Carl Dale 71'; Mark Harris 89' (o.g.)	Gillingham report		Stadium: Ninian Park; Attendance: 3,028; Referee: Jim Rushton (Stoke)

27 February 1996 32	Torquay United	0–0	Cardiff City	Torquay
				Stadium: Plainmoor; Attendance: 2,004

2 March 1996 33	Chester City	4–0	Cardiff City	Chester
	Ross Davidson; Chris Priest; Dave Rogers (pen.); Stuart Rimmer			Stadium: Deva Stadium; Attendance: 2,308

5 March 1996 34	Cardiff City	3–0	Wigan Athletic	Cardiff
19:30	Jimmy Gardner; Jimmy Gardner; Tony Philliskirk			Stadium: Ninian Park; Attendance: 1,611

9 March 1996 35	Cardiff City	1–4	Fulham	Cardiff
15:00	Carl Dale		Rodney McAree; Rob Scott; Mike Conroy; Mike Conroy	Stadium: Ninian Park; Attendance: 3,489

12 March 1996 36	Exeter City	2–0	Cardiff City	Exeter
	Richard Pears; Mark Cooper (pen.)			Stadium: St James Park; Attendance: 2,609

16 March 1996 37	Wigan Athletic	3–1	Cardiff City	Wigan
	Kevin Sharp; Kevin Sharp; Mark Leonard		Steve Flack	Stadium: Springfield Park (Wigan); Attendance: 2,789

23 March 1996 38	Cardiff City	0–1	Preston North End	Cardiff
15:00			Andy Saville	Stadium: Ninian Park; Attendance: 3,642

30 March 1996 39	Cardiff City	1–1	Cambridge United	Cardiff
15:00	Carl Dale (pen.)		Tony Richards	Stadium: Ninian Park; Attendance: 2,440

2 April 1996 40	Barnet	1–0	Cardiff City	Chipping Barnet
	Sean Devine			Stadium: Underhill Stadium; Attendance: 2,107

6 April 1996 41	Colchester United	1–0	Cardiff City	Colchester
15:00	Mark Kinsella 56'			Stadium: Layer Road; Attendance: 3,349; Referee: Gurnam Singh (Wolverhampton)

8 April 1996 42	Cardiff City	1–1	Lincoln City	Cardiff
15:00	Carl Dale		Colin Alcide	Stadium: Ninian Park; Attendance: 2,788

13 April 1996 43	Scunthorpe United	1–1	Cardiff City	Scunthorpe
	Alan Knill		Carl Dale	Stadium: Old Show Ground; Attendance: 2,044

20 April 1996 44	Cardiff City	0–1	Plymouth Argyle	Cardiff
15:00			Mickey Evans	Stadium: Ninian Park; Attendance: 3,489

27 April 1996 45	Cardiff City	3–2	Hereford United	Cardiff
15:00	Carl Dale; Tony Philliskirk; Tony Philliskirk		Steve White; Murray Fishlock	Stadium: Ninian Park; Attendance: 3,870

4 May 1996 46	Bury	3–0	Cardiff City	Bury
	David Pugh; David Johnson; Tony Rigby			Stadium: Gigg Lane; Attendance: 5,658

=== League Cup ===
16 August 1995 Round 1 (First leg)	Portsmouth	0–2	Cardiff City	Portsmouth
			Carl Dale; Tony Bird	Stadium: Fratton Park; Attendance: 4,203

22 August 1995 Round 1 (Second leg)	Cardiff City	1–0 (3–0 agg.)	Portsmouth	Cardiff
19:30	Carl Dale			Stadium: Ninian Park; Attendance: 4,347; Referee: John Brandwood (Lichfield)

19 September 1995 Round 2 (First leg)	Cardiff City	0–3	Southampton	Cardiff
19:30			Matt Le Tissier; Matt Le Tissier; Neil Shipperley	Stadium: Ninian Park; Attendance: 9,041

4 October 1995 Round 2 (Second leg)	Southampton	2–1 (5–1 agg.)	Cardiff City	Southampton
	Gordon Watson; Richard Hall		Ian Rodgerson	Stadium: The Dell; Attendance: 12,709; Referee: Steve Dunn (Bristol)

=== FA Cup ===
11 November 1995 Round 1	Rushden & Diamonds	1–3	Cardiff City	Irthlingborough
	Al-James Hannigan 46'		24' Carl Dale; 71' Carl Dale; 28' Lee Jarman	Stadium: Nene Park; Attendance: 4,212

2 December 1995 Round 2	Swindon Town	2–0	Cardiff City	Swindon
15:00	Wayne Allison 58'; Steve Finney 83'			Stadium: County Ground; Attendance: 8,274

=== Auto Windscreens Shield ===
26 September 1995 Round 1 (Block)	Hereford United	3–3	Cardiff City	Hereford
	Richard Wilkins; Richard Wilkins; Dean Smith		Carl Dale; Carl Dale; Darren Adams	Stadium: Edgar Street; Attendance: 1,411

17 October 1995 Round 1 (Block)	Cardiff City	3–2	Gillingham	Cardiff
19:30	Carl Dale 15', 89'; Darren Adams 80'; Paul Harding (red card) 72'	Gillingham report	14' Darren Freeman 47' (pen.) Adrian Foster; (yellow card) 29' (yellow-red card) 73' Dave Martin	Stadium: Ninian Park; Attendance: 1,034; Referee: Paul Rejer (Staffordshire)

28 November 1995 Round 2	Cardiff City	1–2	Northampton Town	Cardiff
	Carl Dale (pen.)		Roy Hunter; Neil Grayson	Stadium: Ninian Park; Attendance: 1,450

== See also ==
- List of Cardiff City F.C. seasons

== Bibliography ==
- Hayes, Dean (2006). The Who's Who of Cardiff City. Breedon Books. ISBN 1-85983-462-0.
- Shepherd, Richard (2002). The Definitive Cardiff City F.C. Tony Brown. ISBN 1-899-46817-X.
- Crooks, John (1992). Cardiff City Football Club: Official History of the Bluebirds. Yore Publications. ISBN 0-9513321-8-X.
- Rollin, Jack, ed. (1996). Rothmans Football Yearbook 1996-97. Headline Book Publishing. ISBN 0-7472-7781-8.
- "Football Club History Database – Cardiff City".
- Welsh Football Data Archive
