= 1993–94 Cardiff City F.C. season =

Welsh football club season

Cardiff City
1993–94 season
- Owner: Rick Wright
- Manager: Eddie May
- Football League Second Division: 19th
- FA Cup: 5th round
- League Cup: 1st round
- European Cup Winners Cup: 1st round
- Welsh Cup: Runners-up
- Autoglass Trophy: 2nd round
- Top goalscorer: League: Nathan Blake (14); All: Phil Stant (22)
- Highest home attendance: 10,847 (v Wrexham, 5 February 1994)
- Lowest home attendance: 3,583 (v Rotherham United, 29 March 1994)
- Average home league attendance: 6,080

The 1993–94 season was Cardiff City F.C.'s 67th season in the Football League. They competed in the 24-team Division Two, then the third tier of English football, finishing nineteenth.

== Players ==
First team squad. Note: Flags indicate national team as defined under FIFA eligibility rules; some limited exceptions apply. Players may hold more than one non-FIFA nationality.

| No. | Pos. | Nation | Player |
|---|---|---|---|
| -- | GK | ENG | Mark Grew |
| -- | GK | ENG | Phil Kite |
| -- | GK | WAL | Steve Williams |
| -- | DF | WAL | Gareth Abraham |
| -- | DF | WAL | Mark Aizlewood |
| -- | DF | WAL | Lee Baddeley |
| -- | DF | IRL | Derek Brazil |
| -- | DF | WAL | Terry Evans |
| -- | DF | WAL | Ben Graham |
| -- | DF | WAL | Ian Jones |
| -- | DF | WAL | Alan Knill |
| -- | DF | WAL | Jason Perry |
| -- | DF | WAL | Kevin Ratcliffe |
| -- | DF | WAL | Damon Searle |
| -- | DF | WAL | Scott Young |
| -- | MF | ENG | Kevin Bartley |
| -- | MF | ENG | Kevin Brock |

| No. | Pos. | Nation | Player |
|---|---|---|---|
| -- | MF | ENG | John Cornwell |
| -- | MF | ENG | Wayne Fereday |
| -- | MF | GUY | Cohen Griffith |
| -- | MF | ENG | Paul Hunt |
| -- | MF | WAL | Robbie James |
| -- | MF | NIR | Paul Millar |
| -- | MF | ENG | Nick Richardson |
| -- | MF | WAL | Lee Walker |
| -- | MF | WAL | Nathan Wigg |
| -- | MF | ENG | Darren Adams |
| -- | FW | WAL | Tony Bird |
| -- | FW | WAL | Nathan Blake |
| -- | FW | WAL | Carl Dale |
| -- | FW | WAL | Andy Evans |
| -- | FW | ENG | Phil Stant |
| -- | FW | ENG | Garry Thompson |

== Standings ==
| Pos | Team | Pld | W | D | L | GF | GA | GD | Pts | Promotion or relegation |
|---|---|---|---|---|---|---|---|---|---|---|
| 17 | Bournemouth | 46 | 14 | 15 | 17 | 51 | 59 | −8 | 57 | |
| 18 | Leyton Orient | 46 | 14 | 14 | 18 | 57 | 71 | −14 | 56 | |
| 19 | Cardiff City | 46 | 13 | 15 | 18 | 66 | 79 | −13 | 54 | |
| 20 | Blackpool | 46 | 16 | 5 | 25 | 63 | 75 | −12 | 53 | |
| 21 | Fulham (R) | 46 | 14 | 10 | 22 | 50 | 63 | −13 | 52 | Relegation to the Third Division |

(R) Relegated

=== Results by round ===
| Round | 1 | 2 | 3 | 4 | 5 | 6 | 7 | 8 | 9 | 10 | 11 | 12 | 13 | 14 | 15 | 16 | 17 | 18 | 19 | 20 | 21 | 22 | 23 | 24 | 25 | 26 | 27 | 28 | 29 | 30 | 31 | 32 | 33 | 34 | 35 | 36 | 37 | 38 | 39 | 40 | 41 | 42 | 43 | 44 | 45 | 46 |
|---|---|---|---|---|---|---|---|---|---|---|---|---|---|---|---|---|---|---|---|---|---|---|---|---|---|---|---|---|---|---|---|---|---|---|---|---|---|---|---|---|---|---|---|---|---|---|
| Ground | H | A | H | A | A | H | A | H | A | A | H | A | H | A | H | A | H | H | A | H | H | A | A | H | H | A | H | A | H | A | A | A | H | H | A | H | A | A | H | A | H | A | H | H | H | A |
| Result | W | W | D | D | D | L | L | L | L | D | L | L | D | D | W | D | D | W | D | W | W | L | L | D | W | L | W | L | L | L | W | L | D | W | L | D | D | W | D | L | W | D | W | L | L | L |
| Position | ~ | ~ | 3 | 4 | 6 | 11 | 17 | 19 | 19 | 22 | 22 | 22 | 21 | 21 | 21 | 20 | 19 | 18 | 18 | 17 | 15 | 16 | 17 | 17 | 18 | 20 | 19 | 21 | 21 | 21 | 21 | 21 | 21 | 21 | 21 | 21 | 21 | 21 | 21 | 21 | 19 | 19 | 17 | 18 | 18 | 19 |
| Points | 3 | 6 | 7 | 8 | 9 | 9 | 9 | 9 | 9 | 10 | 10 | 10 | 11 | 12 | 15 | 16 | 17 | 20 | 21 | 24 | 27 | 27 | 27 | 28 | 31 | 31 | 34 | 34 | 34 | 34 | 37 | 37 | 38 | 41 | 41 | 42 | 43 | 46 | 47 | 47 | 50 | 51 | 54 | 54 | 54 | 54 |

A = Away; H = Home; W = Win; D = Draw; L = Loss

== Fixtures and results ==
=== Second Division ===
| 14 August 1993 1 | Cardiff City | 2–0 | Leyton Orient | Cardiff |
| 15:00 | Nathan Blake; Cohen Griffith | | | Stadium: Ninian Park; Attendance: 9,920 |

| 21 August 1993 2 | Fulham | 1–3 | Cardiff City | London |
| | Lee Baddeley (o.g.) | | Nathan Blake; Nathan Blake; Garry Thompson | Stadium: Craven Cottage; Attendance: 5,696 |

| 28 August 1993 3 | Cardiff City | 2–2 | Brighton & Hove Albion | Cardiff |
| 15:00 | Nathan Blake; John Cornwell | | Kurt Nogan; Stuart Munday | Stadium: Ninian Park; Attendance: 7,687 |

| 31 August 1993 4 | Exeter City | 2–2 | Cardiff City | Exeter |
| | Ronnie Jepson; Stuart Storer | | Cohen Griffith; John Cornwell | Stadium: St James Park; Attendance: 3,044; Referee: Terry Holbrook (Walsall) |

| 4 September 1993 5 | Port Vale | 2–2 | Cardiff City | Stoke |
| | Bernie Slaven; Bernie Slaven | | Nathan Blake; Cohen Griffith | Stadium: Vale Park; Attendance: 8,140 |

| 11 September 1993 6 | Cardiff City | 3–4 | Hull City | Cardiff |
| 15:00 | Garry Thompson; Nick Richardson; Nick Richardson (pen.) | | Chris Lee; Chris Lee; Steve Moran; Matt Bound | Stadium: Ninian Park; Attendance: 7,421; Referee: Gurnam Singh (Wolverhampton) |

| 18 September 1993 7 | Blackpool | 1–0 | Cardiff City | Blackpool |
| | Bryan Griffiths | | | Stadium: Bloomfield Road; Attendance: 4,767 |

| 25 September 1993 8 | Cardiff City | 2–3 | Plymouth Argyle | Cardiff |
| 15:00 | Phil Stant; Paul Millar (footballer, born 1966) | | Kevin Nugent; Kevin Nugent; Andy Comyn | Stadium: Ninian Park; Attendance: 6,632; Referee: John Brandwood (Lichfield) |

| 2 October 1993 9 | York City | 5–0 | Cardiff City | York |
| | Derek Brazil (o.g.); Steve Cooper; Gary Swann; Paul Barnes; Jon McCarthy | | | Stadium: Bootham Crescent; Attendance: 3,762 |

| 10 October 1993 10 | Barnet | 0–0 | Cardiff City | Chipping Barnet |
| | | | | Stadium: Underhill Stadium; Attendance: 2,084 |

| 16 October 1993 11 | Cardiff City | 1–2 | Bristol Rovers | Cardiff |
| 15:00 | Nick Richardson (pen.) | | John Taylor; John Taylor | Stadium: Ninian Park; Attendance: 5,563 |

| 23 October 1993 12 | Wrexham | 3–1 | Cardiff City | Wrexham |
| 15:00 | Mark Taylor 51', 61'; Gary Bennett 75' | Wrexham report | 88' Tony Bird | Stadium: The Racecourse; Attendance: 4,245; Referee: Terry Heilbron |

| 30 October 1993 13 | Cardiff City | 2–2 | Hartlepool United | Cardiff |
| 15:00 | Tony Bird 52'; Nathan Blake 70' (pen.) | | 3' Lenny Johnrose; 20' Colin West | Stadium: Ninian Park; Attendance: 3,710; Referee: Ron Groves (Weston-Super-Mare) |

| 2 November 1993 14 | Brentford | 1–1 | Cardiff City | London |
| | Joe Allon | | Nathan Blake | Stadium: Griffin Park; Attendance: 4,756 |

| 6 November 1993 15 | Cardiff City | 3–1 | Stockport County | Cardiff |
| 15:00 | Nathan Blake; Nathan Blake; Nathan Blake (pen.) | | David Frain | Stadium: Ninian Park; Attendance: 4,738 |

| 19 November 1993 16 | Cambridge United | 1–1 | Cardiff City | Cambridge |
| | Steve Claridge | | Tony Bird | Stadium: Abbey Stadium; Attendance: 3,076 |

| 27 November 1993 17 | Cardiff City | 1–1 | Bradford City | Cardiff |
| 15:00 | Phil Stant | | Sean McCarthy | Stadium: Ninian Park; Attendance: 4,213; Referee: Clive Wilkes (Oxford) |

| 11 December 1993 18 | Cardiff City | 1–0 | Fulham | Cardiff |
| 15:00 | Nathan Blake | | | Stadium: Ninian Park; Attendance: 5,120; Referee: Paul Vanes (West Midlands) |

| 18 December 1993 19 | Leyton Orient | 2–2 | Cardiff City | London |
| | Mark Cooper; Glenn Cockerill | | Phil Stant; Garry Thompson | Stadium: Brisbane Road; Attendance: 3,691 |

| 22 December 1993 20 | Cardiff City | 1–0 | Swansea City | Cardiff |
| 19:30 | Garry Thompson | | | Stadium: Ninian Park; Attendance: 9,815 |

| 1 January 1994 21 | Cardiff City | 3–0 | Reading | Cardiff |
| 15:00 | Cohen Griffith; Mark Aizlewood; Nick Richardson | | | Stadium: Ninian Park; Attendance: 10,257; Referee: Paul Durkin (Dorset) |

| 3 January 1994 22 | Rotherham United | 5–2 | Cardiff City | Rotherham |
| | Imre Varadi; Imre Varadi; Imre Varadi; Shaun Goater; Shaun Goodwin | | (pen.) Paul Millar (pen.) Paul Millar | Stadium: Millmoor; Attendance: 3,395 |

| 15 January 1994 23 | Bristol Rovers | 2–1 | Cardiff City | Bath, Somerset |
| | John Taylor; Ian MacLean | | Nathan Blake | Stadium: Twerton Park; Attendance: 5,683 |

| 22 January 1994 24 | Cardiff City | 0–0 | Barnet | Cardiff |
| 15:00 | | | | Stadium: Ninian Park; Attendance: 5,698; Referee: Martin Bodenham (East Looe) |

| 5 February 1994 25 | Cardiff City | 5–1 | Wrexham | Cardiff |
| 15:00 | Darren Adams 30' Nick Richardson 37'; Tony Bird 55'; Nathan Blake 62', 63' | Wrexham report | 1' (o.g.) Lee Baddeley; (red card) 5' Gary Bennett; (red card) 29' Barry Hunter | Stadium: Ninian Park; Attendance: 10,847; Referee: Keith Cooper (Pontypridd) |

| 12 February 1994 26 | Burnley | 2–0 | Cardiff City | Burnley |
| | Tony Philliskirk 54'; John Francis 69' | | | Stadium: Turf Moor; Attendance: 11,276 |

| 1 March 1994 27 | Cardiff City | 2–1 | Burnley | Cardiff |
| 19:30 | Garry Thompson; Phil Stant | | 18' Steve Davis | Stadium: Ninian Park; Attendance: 5,496; Referee: David Orr (Buckinghamshire) |

| 5 March 1994 28 | Hull City | 1–0 | Cardiff City | Hull |
| | Dean Windass (pen.) | | | Stadium: Boothferry Park; Attendance: 4,998 |

| 12 March 1994 29 | Cardiff City | 0–2 | Blackpool | Cardiff |
| 15:00 | | | Andy Watson; Bryan Griffiths | Stadium: Ninian Park; Attendance: 5,186 |

| 15 March 1994 30 | Bournemouth | 3–2 | Cardiff City | Bournemouth |
| | Steve Cotterill; Steve Cotterill; Gary Chivers | | Carl Dale; Cohen Griffith | Stadium: Dean Court; Attendance: 2,385 |

| 19 March 1994 31 | Plymouth Argyle | 1–2 | Cardiff City | Plymouth |
| | Mickey Evans | | Phil Stant; Phil Stant | Stadium: Home Park; Attendance: 9,587 |

| 22 March 1994 32 | Hartlepool United | 3–0 | Cardiff City | Hartlepool |
| | Paul Olsson 25'; Nicky Southall 61' (pen.); Keith Houchen 75' | | | Stadium: Victoria Park; Attendance: 1,077 |

| 26 March 1994 33 | Cardiff City | 0–0 | York City | Cardiff |
| 15:00 | | | | Stadium: Ninian Park; Attendance: 4,806 |

| 29 March 1994 34 | Cardiff City | 1–0 | Rotherham United | Cardiff |
| 19:30 | Tony Bird | | | Stadium: Ninian Park; Attendance: 3,583; Referee: Clive Wilkes (Oxford) |

| 2 April 1994 35 | Swansea City | 1–0 | Cardiff City | Swansea |
| | David Penney | | | Stadium: Vetch Field; Attendance: 3,711 |

| 4 April 1994 36 | Cardiff City | 2–2 | Huddersfield Town | Cardiff |
| 15:00 | Kevin Brock; Jason Perry | | Phil Starbuck; Simon Baldry | Stadium: Ninian Park; Attendance: 5,525 |

| 9 April 1994 37 | Reading | 1–1 | Cardiff City | Reading |
| | Michael Gilkes | | (o.g.) Jeff Hopkins | Stadium: Elm Park; Attendance: 7,219 |

| 12 April 1994 38 | Brighton & Hove Albion | 3–5 | Cardiff City | Brighton |
| | Paul McCarthy; Kurt Nogan; Kurt Nogan (pen.) | | Paul Millar (pen.) Paul Millar (pen.) Paul Millar; Phil Stant; Wayne Fereday | Stadium: Goldstone Ground; Attendance: 7,653 |

| 16 April 1994 39 | Cardiff City | 1–1 | Brentford | Cardiff |
| 15:00 | Kevin Brock | | Lee Harvey | Stadium: Ninian Park; Attendance: 5,268 |

| 19 April 1994 40 | Huddersfield Town | 2–0 | Cardiff City | Huddersfield |
| | Andy Booth; Andy Booth | | | Stadium: Leeds Road; Attendance: 6,267 |

| 21 April 1994 41 | Cardiff City | 2–1 | Bournemouth | Cardiff |
| 19:30 | Phil Stant; Paul Millar (pen.) | | Steve Fletcher | Stadium: Ninian Park; Attendance: 3,838 |

| 23 April 1994 42 | Stockport County | 2–2 | Cardiff City | Stockport |
| | Bill Williams; Jim Gannon | | Phil Stant (o.g.) Mike Flynn | Stadium: Edgeley Park; Attendance: 5,455 |

| 26 April 1994 43 | Cardiff City | 2–0 | Exeter City | Cardiff |
| 19:30 | Mark Aizlewood; Carl Dale | | | Stadium: Ninian Park; Attendance: 4,631 |

| 30 April 1994 44 | Cardiff City | 2–7 | Cambridge United | Cardiff |
| 15:00 | Cohen Griffith; Carl Dale | | Danny Granville; Steve Butler; Steve Butler; Steve Butler; Carlo Corazzin; Carlo Corazzin; Matthew Joseph | Stadium: Ninian Park; Attendance: 5,175 |

| 3 May 1994 45 | Cardiff City | 1–3 | Port Vale | Cardiff |
| 19:30 | Phil Stant | | Kevin Kent; David Lowe; Ian Taylor | Stadium: Ninian Park; Attendance: 4,705 |

| 7 May 1994 46 | Bradford City | 2–0 | Cardiff City | Bradford |
| | Paul Reid; Dean Richards | | | Stadium: Valley Parade; Attendance: 6,642 |

=== League Cup ===
| 17 August 1993 Round 1 (First leg) | Bournemouth | 3–1 | Cardiff City | Bournemouth |
| | Steve Fletcher; Neil Masters; Russell Beardsmore | | Tony Bird | Stadium: Dean Court; Attendance: 3,054 |

| 24 August 1993 Round 1 (Second leg) | Cardiff City | 1–1 (2–4 agg.) | Bournemouth | Cardiff |
| 19:30 | Mark Morris (o.g.) | | Joe Parkinson | Stadium: Ninian Park; Attendance: 4,549 |

=== FA Cup ===
| 13 November 1993 Round 1 | Enfield | 0–0 | Cardiff City | Enfield, London |
| | | | | Stadium: Southbury Road; Attendance: 2,374 |

| 30 November 1993 Round 1 (Replay) | Cardiff City | 1–0 | Enfield | Cardiff |
| 19:30 | Nathan Blake | | | Stadium: Ninian Park; Attendance: 3,232 |

| 4 December 1993 Round 2 | Brentford | 1–3 | Cardiff City | Brentford |
| | Marcus Gayle | | (o.g.) Shane Westley; Phil Stant; Tony Bird | Stadium: Griffin Park; Attendance: 4,845 |

| 8 January 1994 Round 3 | Cardiff City | 2–2 | Middlesbrough | Cardiff |
| 15:00 | Phil Stant; Garry Thompson | | Paul Wilkinson; Alan Moore | Stadium: Ninian Park; Attendance: 13,750 |

| 19 January 1994 Round 3 (Replay) | Middlesbrough | 1–2 | Cardiff City | Middlesbrough |
| | Graham Kavanagh | | Phil Stant; Nathan Blake | Stadium: Ayresome Park; Attendance: 10,769 |

| 29 January 1994 Round 4 | Cardiff City | 1–0 | Manchester City | Cardiff |
| 15:00 | Nathan Blake | | | Stadium: Ninian Park; Attendance: 20,486 |

| 20 February 1994 Round 5 | Cardiff City | 1–2 | Luton Town | Cardiff |
| 15:00 | Phil Stant 65' | Luton report | 39' Scott Oakes; 70' David Preece | Stadium: Ninian Park; Attendance: 17,296; Referee: Roger Dilkes (Lancashire) |

=== UEFA Cup Winners Cup ===
| 15 September 1993 Round 1 (First leg) | Standard Liege | 5–2 | Cardiff City | Liege |
| | Roberto Bisconti 13'; Marc Wilmots 63', 84'; Andre Cruz 71' (pen.); Patrick Asselman 76' | | 39', 62' Tony Bird | Stadium: Stade Maurice Dufrasne; Attendance: 10,700 |

| 28 September 1993 Round 1 (Second leg) | Cardiff City | 1–3 (3–8 agg.) | Standard Liege | Cardiff |
| 20:00 | Robbie James 59' | | 14' Marc Wilmots; 36' Mohammed Lashaf; 50' Roberto Bisconti | Stadium: Ninian Park; Attendance: 6,006; Referee: Graziano Cesari (Italy) |

=== Welsh Cup ===
| 26 October 1993 Round 3 | Cardiff City | 2–0 | Afan Lido | Cardiff |
| 19:30 | Tony Bird; Garry Thompson | | | Stadium: Ninian Park; Attendance: 1,451; Referee: Howard King (Merthyr Tydfil) |

| 7 December 1993 Round 4 | Wrexham | 0–2 | Cardiff City | Wrexham |
| 19:30 | | Wrexham report | 1' Tony Bird; 28' Phil Stant | Stadium: The Racecourse; Attendance: 2,142; Referee: Brian Lawlor |

| 9 February 1994 Round 5 | Ebbw Vale | 1–1 | Cardiff City | Ebbw Vale |
| | Goal | | Darren Adams | Stadium: Eugene Cross Park; Attendance: 3,750 |

| 22 February 1994 Round 5 (Replay) | Cardiff City | 3–0 | Ebbw Vale | Cardiff |
| 19:30 | Garry Thompson; Tony Bird; Phil Stant | | | Stadium: Ninian Park; Attendance: 1,850; Referee: Roger Gifford (Llanbradach) |

| 14 April 1994 Semi Final (First leg) | Swansea City | 1–2 | Cardiff City | Swansea |
| | John Cornforth | | Phil Stant; Phil Stant | Stadium: Vetch Field; Attendance: 3,286 |

| 28 April 1994 Semi Final (Second leg) | Cardiff City | 4–1 (6–2 agg.) | Swansea City | Cardiff |
| 19:30 | Wayne Fereday; Tony Bird; Phil Stant; Paul Millar (pen.) | | Andy McFarlane | Stadium: Ninian Park; Attendance: 5,606 |

| 15 May 1994 Final | Barry Town | 2–1 | Cardiff City | Cardiff |
| 15:00 | Dave D'Auria; David Hough | | Phil Stant | Stadium: National Stadium; Attendance: 14,500; Referee: J Lloyd (Wrexham) |

=== Autoglass Trophy ===
| 20 October 1993 Preliminary Round | Bristol Rovers | 3–0 | Cardiff City | Bath, Somerset |
| | Justin Skinner; Marcus Stewart; Marcus Stewart | | | Stadium: Twerton Park; Attendance: 2,035 |

| 9 November 1993 Preliminary Round | Cardiff City | 2–0 | Torquay United | Cardiff |
| 19:30 | Garry Thompson; Phil Stant | | | Stadium: Ninian Park; Attendance: 1,642; Referee: Ron Groves (Weston) |

| 14 December 1993 Round 2 | Wycombe Wanderers | 3–2 | Cardiff City | High Wycombe |
| | Tim Langford; Terry Evans; Steve Guppy | | Phil Stant; Cohen Griffith | Stadium: Adams Park; Attendance: 2,703 |

== See also ==
- List of Cardiff City F.C. seasons

== Bibliography ==
- Hayes, Dean (2006). The Who's Who of Cardiff City. Breedon Books. ISBN 1-85983-462-0.
- Shepherd, Richard (2002). The Definitive Cardiff City F.C. Tony Brown. ISBN 1-899-46817-X.
- Crooks, John (1992). Cardiff City Football Club: Official History of the Bluebirds. Yore Publications. ISBN 0-9513321-8-X.
- Rollin, Jack, ed. (1994). Rothmans Football Yearbook 1994-95. Headline Book Publishing. ISBN 0-7472-7857-1.
- "Football Club History Database – Cardiff City". Archived from the original on 30 December 2008.
- Welsh Football Data Archive
