= 1992–93 Cardiff City F.C. season =

Welsh football club season

Cardiff City
1992–93 season
- Owner: Rick Wright
- Manager: Eddie May
- Football League Third Division: 1st
- FA Cup: 1st round
- League Cup: 1st round
- European Cup Winners Cup: 1st round
- Welsh Cup: Winners
- Autoglass Trophy: 2nd round
- Top goalscorer: League: Chris Pike, Phil Stant (12); All: Phil Stant (19)
- Highest home attendance: 17,253 (v Shrewsbury, 1 May 1993)
- Lowest home attendance: 4,348 (v Bury, 28 November 1992)
- Average home league attendance: 7,797

The 1992–93 season was Cardiff City F.C.'s 66th season in the Football League. They competed in the 22-team Division Three, then the fourth tier of English football, finishing first, winning promotion to Division Two.

== Players ==
First team squad. Note: Flags indicate national team as defined under FIFA eligibility rules; some limited exceptions apply. Players may hold more than one non-FIFA nationality.

| Pos. | Nation | Player |
|---|---|---|
| GK | ENG | Mark Grew |
| GK | ENG | Gavin Ward |
| DF | WAL | Gareth Abraham |
| DF | WAL | Lee Baddeley |
| DF | IRL | Derek Brazil |
| DF | WAL | Andy Gorman |
| DF | NIR | Neil Matthews |
| DF | WAL | Jason Perry |
| DF | WAL | Kevin Ratcliffe |
| DF | WAL | Damon Searle |
| DF | ENG | John Williams |
| MF | ENG | Nilsson Callaway |

| Pos. | Nation | Player |
|---|---|---|
| MF | GUY | Cohen Griffith |
| MF | WAL | Robbie James |
| MF | ENG | Nyrere Kelly |
| MF | NIR | Paul Millar |
| MF | NIR | Paul Ramsey |
| MF | ENG | Nick Richardson |
| FW | WAL | Tony Bird |
| FW | WAL | Nathan Blake |
| FW | WAL | Carl Dale |
| FW | WAL | Chris Pike |
| FW | ENG | Phil Stant |

== Table ==
| Pos | Team | Pld | W | D | L | GF | GA | GD | Pts | Promotion or relegation |
|---|---|---|---|---|---|---|---|---|---|---|
| 1 | Cardiff City (C, P) | 42 | 25 | 8 | 9 | 77 | 47 | +30 | 83 | Cup Winners' Cup first round and promotion to the Second Division |
| 2 | Wrexham (P) | 42 | 23 | 11 | 8 | 75 | 52 | +23 | 80 | Promotion to the Second Division |
| 3 | Barnet (P) | 42 | 23 | 10 | 9 | 66 | 48 | +18 | 79 | Promotion to the Second Division |
| 4 | York City (O, P) | 42 | 21 | 12 | 9 | 72 | 45 | +27 | 75 | Qualification for the Third Division play-offs |
| 5 | Walsall | 42 | 22 | 7 | 13 | 76 | 61 | +15 | 73 | Qualification for the Third Division play-offs |

(C) Champions; (O) Play-off winners; (P) Promoted

=== Results by round ===
| Round | 1 | 2 | 3 | 4 | 5 | 6 | 7 | 8 | 9 | 10 | 11 | 12 | 13 | 14 | 15 | 16 | 17 | 18 | 19 | 20 | 21 | 22 | 23 | 24 | 25 | 26 | 27 | 28 | 29 | 30 | 31 | 32 | 33 | 34 | 35 | 36 | 37 | 38 | 39 | 40 | 41 | 42 |
|---|---|---|---|---|---|---|---|---|---|---|---|---|---|---|---|---|---|---|---|---|---|---|---|---|---|---|---|---|---|---|---|---|---|---|---|---|---|---|---|---|---|---|
| Ground | H | A | H | H | A | H | A | H | H | A | A | H | A | H | A | H | A | H | H | A | H | A | A | A | H | A | H | A | H | A | H | A | H | A | H | A | H | A | H | A | H | A |
| Result | D | W | W | W | L | D | D | W | D | L | L | W | L | W | L | W | W | L | D | L | W | W | W | W | W | W | W | W | D | W | W | W | W | L | D | W | D | L | W | W | W | W |
| Position | ~ | ~ | 3 | 2 | 3 | 3 | 3 | 3 | 5 | ~ | 12 | 9 | 10 | 10 | 10 | 8 | 4 | 7 | 8 | 8 | 7 | 5 | 4 | 4 | 4 | 4 | 2 | 2 | 2 | 2 | 2 | 1 | 1 | 1 | 1 | 1 | 1 | 2 | 1 | 1 | 1 | 1 |
| Points | 1 | 4 | 7 | 10 | 10 | 11 | 12 | 15 | 16 | 16 | 16 | 19 | 19 | 22 | 22 | 25 | 28 | 28 | 29 | 29 | 32 | 35 | 38 | 41 | 44 | 47 | 50 | 53 | 54 | 57 | 60 | 63 | 66 | 66 | 67 | 70 | 71 | 71 | 74 | 77 | 80 | 83 |

A = Away; H = Home; W = Win; D = Draw; L = Loss

== Fixtures and results ==
=== Third Division ===
| 15 August 1992 1 | Cardiff City | 0–0 | Darlington | Cardiff |
| 15:00 | | | | Stadium: Ninian Park; Attendance: 8,399 |

| 22 August 1992 2 | Walsall | 2–3 | Cardiff City | Walsall |
| 15:00 | Charlie Ntamark; Steve O'Hara | | Damon Searle; Carl Dale; Carl Dale | Stadium: Bescot Stadium; Attendance: 4,311 |

| 29 August 1992 3 | Cardiff City | 2–1 | Halifax Town | Cardiff |
| 15:00 | Robbie James 31'; Carl Dale 58' | | 54' Ian Thompstone | Stadium: Ninian Park; Attendance: 7,662; Referee: M James (Horsham) |

| 1 September 1992 4 | Cardiff City | 2–1 | Northampton Town | Cardiff |
| 19:30 | Paul Ramsey 49' (pen.); Carl Dale 58' | | 34' Steve Brown | Stadium: Ninian Park; Attendance: 7,416; Referee: JM Carter |

| 5 September 1992 5 | Torquay United | 2–1 | Cardiff City | Torquay |
| 15:00 | Justin Fashanu; Duane Darby | | Chris Pike | Stadium: Plainmoor; Attendance: 2,939 |

| 8 September 1992 6 | Cardiff City | 2–2 | Carlisle United | Cardiff |
| 19:30 | Chris Pike (pen.); Jason Perry | | Andy Watson; Ricardo Gabbiadini | Stadium: Ninian Park; Attendance: 6,859 |

| 13 September 1992 7 | Hereford United | 1–1 | Cardiff City | Hereford |
| | Chris Fry | | Nathan Blake | Stadium: Edgar Street; Attendance: 4,089 |

| 19 September 1992 8 | Cardiff City | 3–1 | Gillingham | Cardiff |
| 15:00 | Nathan Blake 14'; Chris Pike 45', 58' | Gillingham report | (red card) 81' Richard Green; 90' Nicky Forster | Stadium: Ninian Park; Attendance: 6,456; Referee: Clive Wilkes (Gloucester) |

| 3 October 1992 9 | Cardiff City | 1–1 | Rochdale | Cardiff |
| 15:00 | Chris Pike 16' | | 16' (pen.) Mark Payne | Stadium: Ninian Park; Attendance: 6,161 |

| 10 October 1992 10 | Crewe Alexandra | 2–0 | Cardiff City | Crewe |
| 15:00 | Mark Gardiner; Craig Hignett | | | Stadium: Gresty Road; Attendance: 3,638 |

| 24 October 1992 11 | Shrewsbury Town | 3–2 | Cardiff City | Shrewsbury |
| 15:00 | Carl Griffiths; Carl Griffiths; Carl Griffiths | | Carl Dale (pen.) Chris Pike | Stadium: Gay Meadow; Attendance: 4,161 |

| 31 October 1992 12 | Cardiff City | 3–0 | Scunthorpe United | Cardiff |
| 15:00 | Nathan Blake; Nyrere Kelly; Paul Ramsey (pen.) | | | Stadium: Ninian Park; Attendance: 6,027 |

| 3 November 1992 13 | Chesterfield | 2–1 | Cardiff City | Chesterfield |
| 19:30 | Mick Kennedy; Lee Turnbull | | Robbie James | Stadium: Saltergate; Attendance: 2,590 |

| 7 November 1992 14 | Cardiff City | 3–1 | Colchester United | Cardiff |
| 15:00 | Carl Dale 46'; Nathan Blake 77'; Tony English 78' (o.g.) | | 90' Mark Kinsella | Stadium: Ninian Park; Attendance: 5,505; Referee: K Leach |

| 22 November 1992 15 | Barnet | 2–1 | Cardiff City | Chipping Barnet |
| 13:00 | Dave Barnett; Derek Payne | | Carl Dale | Stadium: Underhill Stadium; Attendance: 4,181 |

| 28 November 1992 16 | Cardiff City | 3–0 | Bury | Cardiff |
| 15:00 | Mark Kearney (o.g.); Nathan Blake; Cohen Griffith | | | Stadium: Ninian Park; Attendance: 4,348 |

| 11 December 1992 17 | Doncaster Rovers | 0–1 | Cardiff City | Doncaster |
| 19:30 | | | Paul Millar | Stadium: Belle Vue; Attendance: 2,023 |

| 18 December 1992 18 | Cardiff City | 1–2 | Wrexham | Cardiff |
| 19:30 | Nathan Blake 44' | Wrexham report | 20', 70' Jonathan Cross | Stadium: Ninian Park; Attendance: 6,832; Referee: Paul Durkin (Dorset) |

| 26 December 1992 19 | Cardiff City | 3–3 | York City | Cardiff |
| 15:00 | Phil Stant; Phil Stant; Andy Gorman | | Ian Blackstone; Ian Blackstone; Paul Barnes | Stadium: Ninian Park; Attendance: 10,411 |

| 28 December 1992 20 | Lincoln City | 3–2 | Cardiff City | Lincoln |
| 15:00 | David Puttnam; Neil Matthews; Dean West | | Paul Ramsey; Paul Millar | Stadium: Sincil Bank; Attendance: 4,359 |

| 2 January 1993 21 | Cardiff City | 2–1 | Hereford United | Cardiff |
| 15:00 | Phil Stant; Nick Richardson | | Max Nicholson | Stadium: Ninian Park; Attendance: 6,593 |

| 9 January 1993 22 | Carlisle United | 1–2 | Cardiff City | Carlisle |
| 15:00 | Ian Arnold (pen.) | | Tony Bird; Kevin Ratcliffe | Stadium: Brunton Park; Attendance: 3,691 |

| 23 January 1993 23 | Gillingham | 0–1 | Cardiff City | Gillingham |
| 15:00 | | Gillingham report | 9' Cohen Griffith | Stadium: Priestfield Stadium; Attendance: 4,069; Referee: Paul Alcock (Surrey) |

| 26 January 1993 24 | Halifax Town | 0–1 | Cardiff City | Halifax |
| 19:30 | | | Phil Stant | Stadium: The Shay; Attendance: 1,339 |

| 30 January 1993 25 | Cardiff City | 2–1 | Walsall | Cardiff |
| 15:00 | Phil Stant; Cohen Griffith | | Rod McDonald | Stadium: Ninian Park; Attendance: 9,012 |

| 6 February 1993 26 | Darlington | 0–2 | Cardiff City | Darlington |
| 15:00 | | | Chris Pike (pen.) Chris Pike | Stadium: Feethams; Attendance: 1,775 |

| 13 February 1993 27 | Cardiff City | 4–0 | Torquay United | Cardiff |
| 15:00 | Paul Millar; Phil Stant; Phil Stant; Nathan Blake | | | Stadium: Ninian Park; Attendance: 7,771 |

| 19 February 1993 28 | Northampton Town | 1–2 | Cardiff City | Northampton |
| 19:30 | Steve Brown (pen.) | | Phil Stant; Chris Pike | Stadium: County Ground; Attendance: 4,519 |

| 27 February 1993 29 | Cardiff City | 1–1 | Crewe Alexandra | Cardiff |
| 15:00 | Cohen Griffith | | Phil Clarkson | Stadium: Ninian Park; Attendance: 10,012 |

| 6 March 1993 30 | Rochdale | 1–2 | Cardiff City | Rochdale |
| 15:00 | Jon Bowden 83' | | 21' (pen.) Nathan Blake; 67' Cohen Griffith | Stadium: Spotland; Attendance: 2,831 |

| 9 March 1993 31 | Cardiff City | 1–0 | Scarborough | Cardiff |
| 19:30 | Phil Stant | | | Stadium: Ninian Park; Attendance: 8,583 |

| 12 March 1993 32 | Colchester United | 2–4 | Cardiff City | Colchester |
| 19:45 | Roy McDonough 17' (pen.); Steve McGavin 57' | | 21' Chris Pike; 33' Chris Pike; 23' Nick Richardson; 63' Neil Matthews | Stadium: Layer Road; Attendance: 4,538; Referee: Graham Pooley (Bishops Stortford) |

| 20 March 1993 33 | Cardiff City | 2–1 | Chesterfield | Cardiff |
| 15:00 | Carl Dale; Nick Richardson | | Dave Lancaster | Stadium: Ninian Park; Attendance: 6,756 |

| 23 March 1993 34 | Bury | 1–0 | Cardiff City | Bury |
| 19:30 | Ian Stevens | | | Stadium: Gigg Lane; Attendance: 3,574 |

| 27 March 1993 35 | Cardiff City | 1–1 | Barnet | Cardiff |
| 15:00 | Cohen Griffith | | Nicky Evans | Stadium: Ninian Park; Attendance: 16,073 |

| 3 April 1993 36 | Scarborough | 1–3 | Cardiff City | Scarborough |
| 15:00 | Steve Charles (pen.) | | (pen.) Chris Pike; Nick Richardson; Phil Stant | Stadium: Athletic Ground; Attendance: 2,223 |

| 6 April 1993 37 | Cardiff City | 1–1 | Doncaster Rovers | Cardiff |
| 19:30 | Jason Perry | | (pen.) Mike Jeffrey | Stadium: Ninian Park; Attendance: 9,938 |

| 10 April 1993 38 | York City | 3–1 | Cardiff City | York |
| 15:00 | Jon McCarthy; Ian Blackstone; Nigel Pepper | | Cohen Griffith | Stadium: Bootham Crescent; Attendance: 6,568 |

| 12 April 1993 39 | Cardiff City | 3–1 | Lincoln City | Cardiff |
| 15:00 | Phil Stant; Nathan Blake; Paul Ramsey (pen.) | | Neil Matthews | Stadium: Ninian Park; Attendance: 11,257 |

| 17 April 1993 40 | Wrexham | 0–2 | Cardiff City | Wrexham |
| 15:00 | | Wrexham report | 26' Cohen Griffith; 39' Nathan Blake | Stadium: The Racecourse; Attendance: 10,852; Referee: Tom Fitzharris |

| 1 May 1993 41 | Cardiff City | 2–1 | Shrewsbury Town | Cardiff |
| 15:00 | Jason Perry; Nathan Blake | | Kevin Summerfield | Stadium: Ninian Park; Attendance: 17,253 |

| 8 May 1993 42 | Scunthorpe United | 0–3 | Cardiff City | Scunthorpe |
| 15:00 | | | 11', 47' Cohen Griffith; 35' Phil Stant | Stadium: Glanford Park; Attendance: 7,407; Referee: John Key (Sheffield) |

=== Coca-Cola Cup (League Cup) ===
| 18 August 1992 Round 1 (First leg) | Cardiff City | 1–0 | Bristol City | Cardiff |
| 19:30 | Carl Dale | | | Stadium: Ninian Park; Attendance: 9,126 |

| 25 August 1992 Round 1 (Second leg) | Bristol City | 5–1 (5–2 agg.) | Cardiff City | Bristol |
| | Andy Cole; Andy Cole; Andy Cole; Leroy Rosenior; Wayne Allison | | Carl Dale | Stadium: Ashton Gate; Attendance: 10,174 |

=== FA Cup ===
| 14 November 1992 Round 1 | Cardiff City | 2–3 | Bath City | Cardiff |
| 15:00 | Paul Millar 25'; Nathan Blake | | 20' Graham Withey; Jerry Gill; 70' Deion Vernon | Stadium: Ninian Park; Attendance: 4,506; Referee: David Frampton (Dorset) |

=== UEFA Cup Winners Cup ===
| 16 September 1992 Round 1 (First leg) | Cardiff City | 1–1 | Admira Wacker | Cardiff |
| 19:30 | Chris Pike 58' | | 44' Johannes Abfalterer | Stadium: Ninian Park; Attendance: 9,634 |

| 29 September 1992 Round 1 (Second leg) | Admira Wacker | 2–0 (3–1 agg.) | Cardiff City | Modling |
| | Olaf Marschall 47'; Johannes Abfalterer 89' | | | Stadium: Sudstadt Stadium; Attendance: 4,700 |

=== Welsh Cup ===
| 27 October 1992 Round 3 | Ton Pentre | 0–2 | Cardiff City | Ton Pentre |
| 14:30 | | | Paul Millar (pen.) Paul Ramsey | Stadium: Ynys Park; Attendance: 1,300 |

| 5 December 1992 Round 4 | Caerau | 0–9 | Cardiff City | Cardiff |
| 15:00 | | | Nick Richardson; Nick Richardson; Nick Richardson; Chris Pike; Carl Dale; Carl Dale; Carl Dale; Carl Dale; Nathan Blake | Stadium: Ninian Park; Attendance: 2,579 |

| 16 January 1993 Round 5 | Cardiff City | 4–0 | Maesteg Park | Cardiff |
| 15:00 | Phil Stant; Phil Stant; Phil Stant; Paul Ramsey | | | Stadium: Ninian Park; Attendance: 2,867 |

| 16 March 1993 Semi Final (First leg) | Cardiff City | 2–0 | Wrexham | Cardiff |
| 19:30 | Cohen Griffith; Carl Dale 78' | Wrexham report | | Stadium: Ninian Park; Attendance: 10,251; Referee: Vic Callow (Solihull) |

| 20 April 1993 Semi Final (Second leg) | Wrexham | 1–0 (2–1 agg.) | Cardiff City | Wrexham |
| 19:30 | Steve Watkin 24' | Wrexham report | | Stadium: The Racecourse; Attendance: 5,735; Referee: PL Wright |

| 16 May 1993 Final | Rhyl | 0–5 | Cardiff City | Cardiff |
| 15:00 | | | Phil Stant; Phil Stant; Phil Stant; Cohen Griffith; Cohen Griffith | Stadium: National Stadium; Attendance: 16,443; Referee: K Burge (Tonypandy) |

=== Autoglass Trophy ===
| 1 December 1992 Round 1 | Shrewsbury Town | 1–3 | Cardiff City | Shrewsbury |
| 19:30 | Carl Griffiths | | Paul Millar; Nick Richardson; Carl Dale | Stadium: Gay Meadow; Attendance: 936 |

| 8 December 1992 Round 1 | Cardiff City | 3–2 | Hereford United | Cardiff |
| 19:30 | Paul Ramsey (pen.); Phil Stant; Carl Dale | | Owen Pickard; Owen Pickard | Stadium: Ninian Park; Attendance: 3,246 |

| 19 January 1993 Round 2 | Cardiff City | 1–2 | Swansea City | Cardiff |
| 19:30 | Nathan Blake | | Andy Legg; Martin Hayes | Stadium: Ninian Park; Attendance: 13,516 |

== Bibliography ==
- Hayes, Dean (2006). The Who's Who of Cardiff City. Breedon Books. ISBN 1-85983-462-0.
- Shepherd, Richard (2002). The Definitive Cardiff City F.C. Tony Brown. ISBN 1-899-46817-X.
- Crooks, John (1992). Cardiff City Football Club: Official History of the Bluebirds. Yore Publications. ISBN 0-9513321-8-X.
- Rollin, Jack, ed. (1992). Rothmans Football Yearbook 1993-94. Headline Book Publishing. ISBN 0-7472-7895-4.
- "Football Club History Database – Cardiff City". Archived from the original on 30 December 2008.
- Welsh Football Data Archive
