= Ryan Nichols =

Ryan Nichols may refer to:

- Ryan Nichols (Halloween character), on List of Halloween (franchise) characters#Ryan Nichols
- Ryan Nichols (V character), on List of V (2009 TV series) episodes

== See also ==
- Ryan Nicholls, Welsh footballer
