= Lee Jarman =

Welsh footballer

Personal information
- Date of birth: 16 December 1977 (age 48)
- Place of birth: Cardiff, Wales
- Height: 1.90 m (6 ft 3 in)
- Position: Defender

Youth career
- 1993–1995: Cardiff City

Senior career*
Years	Team	Apps	(Gls)
1995–1999	Cardiff City	91	(1)
2000	Exeter City	7	(0)
2000–2001	Oxford United	21	(1)
2001–2003	Barry Town	56	(4)
2003–2007	Weston-super-Mare	139	(7)
2007–2008	Newport County	38	(0)
2008–2009	Haverfordwest County	30	(2)
2009–2010	Llanelli	21	(3)
2010–2011	Haverfordwest County	22	(0)
2011–2013	Aberaman Athletic	?	(1)
2013–2014	Barry Town United	10	(0)

International career
1996–?	Wales U21	9	(?)

Managerial career
- 2011–2013: Aberaman Athletic
- * Club domestic league appearances and goals

Lee Jarman (born 16 December 1977) is a Welsh former footballer.

== Early life ==
Born in Cardiff to Ian and Angela Jarman, he grew up in Llanishen and attended Coed Glas School as a child before continuing his education at Llanishen High School. Lee also has a sister called Rhian.

== Career ==
A centre-half, he began his career at his hometown club Cardiff City. Having been involved with the club since the age of 10, he signed schoolboy terms at the age of fifteen and became a YTS player the following year. He made his professional debut during the 1995–96 season in a 3–2 win over Gillingham in the Football League Trophy at the age of 18, following an injury to Lee Baddeley. He made his league debut four days later on 21 October during a 1–0 win over Lincoln City and his early performances saw him recognised as one of the most promising teenage defenders in Britain prompting interest from a handful of Premier League teams, even having offers rejected by Cardiff, and saw him handed his first cap for the Wales under-21 team during a 3–0 win over San Marino during the summer of 1996. He later went on to captain the team.

He was a regular in the side under manager Frank Burrows, spending time playing at right-back, including becoming stand in captain when Dave Penney was injured. Former Cardiff manager Kenny Hibbitt once described Jarman as "the best footballer at Cardiff City" but a gradual loss of form eventually saw him released during the 1999–2000 season.

Jarman spent time on trial at Carlisle United and Brentford before joining non-league team Merthyr Tydfil. In March 2000 he signed for Exeter City on a weekly contract, making seven appearances by the end of the season before being released, joining Oxford United on a one-year deal where he featured regularly in the first half of the 2000–01 season before falling out of favour and leaving the club at the end of his contract. He moved into non-league football to sign for Barry Town where he spent two years before signing for Weston-super-Mare.

In May 2007, he joined Conference South club Newport County. In September 2007 he was named the Conference South Player of the Month. However, despite Newport narrowly missing out on reaching the play-offs and winning the 2008 FAW Premier Cup final, Jarman was released by Newport at the end of the 2007–08 season, signing for Haverfordwest County in the League of Wales Premier Division. He spent one season at Haverfordwest before signing for Welsh Premier League club Llanelli, managed by his former Cardiff teammate Andy Legg. Jarman sat out the opening three months of the season due to injury before making his debut in October, scoring his first goal in only his fourth league appearance during a 4–0 victory over Aberystwyth Town on 27 November.

Jarman made 21 league appearances for Llanelli as they finished second in the league. At the end of the season he was released by the club and re-signed with Haverfordwest County. Jarman departed the club after receiving a management position at Aberdare Athletic alongside former Cardiff City and Barry Town teammate Lee Phillips.

In 2013, Lee Jarman departed Aberdare Athletic F.C. to return to former club Barry Town F.C. (now Barry Town United) as player/coach for the club.
