= Keith Downing =

English football player and manager (born 1965)

Personal information
- Full name: Keith Gordon Downing
- Date of birth: 23 July 1965 (age 61)
- Place of birth: Oldbury, England
- Height: 5 ft 8 in (1.73 m)
- Position: Midfielder

Team information
- Current team: Derby County (first-team coach)

Youth career
- Chelsea

Senior career*
Years	Team	Apps	(Gls)
1983–1984	Mile Oak Rovers		
1984–1987	Notts County	23	(1)
1987–1993	Wolverhampton Wanderers	191	(8)
1993–1994	Birmingham City	1	(0)
1994–1995	Stoke City	16	(0)
1995	Cardiff City	4	(0)
1995–1999	Hereford United	45	(0)
Total		280	(9)

Managerial career
- 2007–2008: Cheltenham Town
- 2013–2014: West Bromwich Albion (caretaker)
- 2015–2016: England U20
- 2016–2020: England U19
- * Club domestic league appearances and goals

Keith Gordon Downing (born 23 July 1965) is an English former footballer and football manager who is a first-team coach at EFL Championship club Derby County. He made the majority of his professional appearances forr Wolverhampton Wanderers.

A former Chelsea youth team player, he moved from Mile Oak Rovers into the English Football League with Notts County in 1984. Three years later, he joined Wolverhampton Wanderers. He spent six years with Wolves, winning the Football League Trophy in 1988 and successive Fourth Division and Third Division titles in 1987–88 and 1988–89. He joined Birmingham City in 1993 before moving on to Stoke City the following year. In 1995, he joined Hereford United via Cardiff City, and retired in 1999.

Downing went on to become a coach and also spent September 2007 to November 2008 as Cheltenham Town manager, and served West Bromwich Albion as caretaker manager for a brief spell in the 2013–14 Premier League season. He was appointed England U20 head coach in July 2015 and then took up the same role with the England U19 team 13 months later, whom he led to the 2017 UEFA European Under-19 Championship title.

== Playing career ==
=== Early career ===
Downing was a junior player at Chelsea but left Stamford Bridge at the end of the 1982–83 season. He spent a season with Mile Oak Rovers. He began his professional career in 1984 at Richie Barker's Notts County, who went on to be relegated out of the Second Division at the end of the 1984–85 season. The "Magpies" finished eighth in the Third Division in the 1985–86 season and then seventh in 1986–87 under the stewardship of Jimmy Sirrel.

=== Wolverhampton Wanderers ===
He left Meadow Lane and moved on to Graham Turner's Wolverhampton Wanderers in 1987. Wolves won promotion as champions of the Fourth Division in 1987–88, and Downing also played in the 1988 Football League Trophy final victory over Burnley at Wembley Stadium. Wolves won a second-successive promotion in the 1988–89 season, winning the Third Division title by an eight-point margin. The club made a push for promotion out of the Second Division in 1989–90 but ended up in tenth place, seven points outside of the play-off places. Downing appeared 35 times in both the 1990–91 and 1991–92 seasons, as Wolves finished in 12th and then 11th position. He played 37 times in the 1992–93 campaign before leaving Molineux in the summer.

=== Later career ===
In July 1993, Downing moved to Birmingham City. However, he featured only twice for Blues in the 1993–94 season and left St Andrew's in the summer. He remained in the Midlands and the First Division for the 1994–95 season, playing 24 games for Stoke City. He began the 1995–96 season with Cardiff City, before being reunited with Graham Turner at Hereford United in September 1995. The "Bulls" finished sixth in the Third Division in the 1995–96 campaign, losing to Darlington in the play-offs. He made 13 appearances in the 1996–97 campaign as Hereford dropped out of the Football League with a last-place finish. He became player-coach in 1998 and subsequently returned to Wolves as a youth team coach in March 1999.

== Managerial career ==
=== Cheltenham Town ===
Downing joined Cheltenham Town as an assistant manager in July 2004, working alongside manager John Ward, who he had met through his time at Wolverhampton Wanderers where Ward had been assistant manager. When Ward left the club to join Carlisle United in October 2007, Downing stepped in as caretaker manager, before being given the position on a full-time basis on 2 November. He endured a difficult start to his management career, but was aided by three loan signings from Bristol City in the January transfer window – Steve Brooker, Alex Russell and Richard Keogh, as well as free agent defender Alan Wright. Cheltenham avoided relegation on the last day of the 2007–08 season with a 2–1 victory over Doncaster Rovers at Whaddon Road. However, they struggled after striker Steven Gillespie was sold to Colchester United for £400,000. Downing left the club by mutual consent on 13 September 2008 with the "Robins" bottom of League One.

=== Coaching spell ===
In February 2009, he was appointed assistant manager at League Two side Port Vale. This was a temporary appointment to help manager Dean Glover, and both men left the club in May 2009. In July 2009, Downing was appointed the academy coach at West Bromwich Albion. He served as joint-assistant head coach for the "Baggies" under Steve Clarke and in December 2013 temporarily took over first-team duties at the Premier League club after Clarke was sacked and before Pepe Mel was appointed manager early the following month. He was not a popular figure with fans at The Hawthorns due to his years of service at Black Country derby rivals Wolves. However, his UEFA Pro Licence and popularity with the players made him a serious candidate to replace Mel in the summer. Alan Irvine got the job however, and Downing left the club in January 2015 following a backroom reshuffle by new boss Tony Pulis.

=== England youth ===
Downing was appointed head coach of the England U20 team in July 2015, initially on an interim basis. His appointment was made permanent in February 2016. He changed roles to become head coach of the England U19 team in August 2016. He led the under-19s to victory in the 2017 UEFA European Under-19 Championship with a 2–1 victory over Portugal. He was a part of Gareth Southgate's scouting team at the 2018 FIFA World Cup in Russia. Downing left his post in August 2020 to join Championship club Bristol City as an assistant head coach to Dean Holden.

=== EFL coach ===
Downing left Bristol City in October 2021. He was appointed as first-team head coach at Plymouth Argyle in December 2021, working under manager Steven Schumacher, who clarified that "Keith has come in as my No 2, if you like". Downing left the club at the end of the 2021–22 season, much to director of football Neil Dewsnip's disappointment. In July 2022, Downing returned to Birmingham City as one of two assistants to newly appointed head coach John Eustace. He left the club on 10 October 2023 after Eustace's dismissal.

In February 2024, he reunited with Eustace again when appointed as an assistant coach alongside Matt Gardiner at Blackburn Rovers. Eustace changed jobs to manage Derby County 12 months later and Downing followed him to Pride Park Stadium to become a first-team coach.

== Personal life ==
Downing married in 1993 and has two sons from that marriage. He is a cousin of Judas Priest guitarist K. K. Downing. His nephew, Paul Downing, also played professional football. He has an interest in criminology and history, specifically the history of World War II.

== Career statistics ==
=== Playing ===
Appearances and goals by club, season and competition
Club	Season	League			FA Cup		League Cup		Other		Total	
Club	Season	Division	Apps	Goals	Apps	Goals	Apps	Goals	Apps	Goals	Apps	Goals
Notts County	1984–85	Second Division	12	0	0	0	0	0	—		12	0
Notts County	1985–86	Third Division	3	0	0	0	0	0	0	0	3	0
Notts County	1986–87	Third Division	8	1	0	0	0	0	0	0	8	1
Notts County	Total		23	1	0	0	0	0	0	0	23	1
Wolverhampton Wanderers	1987–88	Fourth Division	34	1	3	1	3	0	6 (Note: Appearances in Associate Members' Cup/Football League Trophy)	1	46	3
Wolverhampton Wanderers	1988–89	Third Division	32	1	1	0	0	0	6	0	39	1
Wolverhampton Wanderers	1989–90	Second Division	31	3	1	0	3	0	1 (Note: Appearance(s) in Full Members' Cup)	0	36	3
Wolverhampton Wanderers	1990–91	Second Division	31	1	0	0	2	0	2	0	35	1
Wolverhampton Wanderers	1991–92	Second Division	32	0	0	0	2	0	1	0	35	0
Wolverhampton Wanderers	1992–93	First Division	31	2	2	1	2	0	2 (Note: Appearances in Anglo-Italian Cup)	0	37	3
Wolverhampton Wanderers	Total		191	8	7	2	12	0	18	1	228	11
Birmingham City	1993–94	First Division	1	0	0	0	1	0	0	0	2	0
Stoke City	1994–95	First Division	16	0	1	0	2	0	5	1	24	1
Cardiff City	1995–96	Third Division	4	0	0	0	1	0	—		5	0
Hereford United	1995–96	Third Division	29	0	3	0	—		4	0	36	0
Hereford United	1996–97	Third Division	16	0	0	0	3	0	0	0	19	0
Hereford United	Total		45	0	3	0	3	0	4	0	55	0
Career total			280	9	11	2	19	0	27	2	337	13

=== Managerial ===
Managerial record by team and tenure
Team	From	To	Record				
Team	From	To	P	W	D	L	Win %
Cheltenham Town	26 September 2007	5 November 2008	50	14	12	24	28.0
West Bromwich Albion (caretaker)	14 December 2013	9 January 2014	6	1	2	3	16.7
Total			56	15	14	27	26.8

== Honours ==
=== As a player ===
Wolverhampton Wanderers

- Football League Third Division: 1988–89
- Football League Fourth Division: 1987–88
- Full Members' Cup: 1987–88

=== As a manager ===
England U19

- UEFA European Under-19 Championship: 2017
