= Paul Hunt (footballer) =

English footballer (born 1970)

Personal information
- Full name: Paul Craig Hunt
- Date of birth: 8 October 1970 (age 56)
- Place of birth: Swindon, England
- Position: Striker

Youth career
- 1987–1988: Swindon Town

Senior career*
Years	Team	Apps	(Gls)
1989–1993	Swindon Town	11	(0)
1993–1994	Gloucester City	5	(0)
1994	Cardiff City		
- Bristol Rovers
- SK Brann
- Andover
- Cirencester Town
1996–2001	Forest Green Rovers		
- Aberystwyth Town
2001	Bath City		
2001–2002	Merthyr Tydfil		
- Taunton Town
- Clevedon Town
2002–2003	Swindon Supermarine		
2003	Hungerford Town		
- Highworth Town
- Weston-super-Mare
2004–2005	Mangotsfield United		
- Fairford Town
- Weston-super-Mare
- Cirencester Town
- Fairford Town
- Andover
- Highworth Town
- * Club domestic league appearances and goals

Paul Craig Hunt (born 8 October 1970) is an English former professional footballer who played in the Football League for Swindon Town as a striker.

== Career ==
Hunt came through the youth set up at Swindon Town making his first team debut on 16 September 1989 in a home game at the County Ground against Barnsley. Hunt played alongside the likes of Glenn Hoddle, Paul Bodin and Colin Calderwood in his time with Swindon. He eventually left Swindon in May 1993 and signed for Gloucester City.

Brief spells with Cardiff City in the 1993–94 season, Bristol Rovers, Norwegian side SK Brann, Andover and Cirencester Town followed before a long term move to Forest Green Rovers in 1996 where he linked up with manager Frank Gregan who had been his boss at Andover.

Hunt earned back to back promotions with Forest Green through the Southern League in to the Conference National for the 1998–1999 season. He was then a part of the Forest Green side that reached the 1999 FA Trophy final, eventually losing 1–0 against Kingstonian at Wembley Stadium. At the end of the 1999–2000 season he famously came off the bench in a home game against Kettering Town and scored and inspired Forest Green to Conference National safety with just minutes left in the final game of the season. He was again involved in a run which saw Forest Green reach the 2001 FA Trophy Final. However Forest Green again suffered defeat, this time to Canvey Island at Villa Park.

He eventually left Forest Green and followed Frank Gregan to Aberystwyth Town. When Gregan left Aberystwyth Hunt also exited in December 2001. He returned to English football with a short spell at Bath City. He left Bath for a return to Wales with Merthyr Tydfil later that month.

Hunt left Merthyr Tydfil for Clevedon Town. He then signed for Swindon Supermarine in October 2002. He then joined Hungerford Town on a deal until the end of the 2002–2003 season.

Hunt went on to represent several non-league sides around the south west including a couple of spells at Weston-super-Mare. In December 2004, he joined Mangotsfield United.

In May 2007, he was appointed assistant manager to Adi Viveash at Cirencester Town. He would then go on to work as assistant manager at Thatcham Town.
