= Paul Millar (footballer, born 1966) =

Northern Irish footballer (born 1966)

Personal information
- Full name: Paul William Millar
- Date of birth: 16 November 1966 (age 60)
- Place of birth: Belfast, Northern Ireland
- Height: 6 ft 2 in (1.88 m)
- Positions: Midfielder; forward

Senior career*
Years	Team	Apps	(Gls)
1984–1987	Glentoran	43	(12)
1987–1988	Portadown	32	(10)
1988–1991	Port Vale	40	(5)
1990	→ Hereford United (loan)	5	(2)
1991–1995	Cardiff City	120	(17)
1995–1998	Linfield	52	(13)
1998–2000	Portadown	28	(7)
2000–2001	Bangor	66	(23)
2001–2002	Ards	32	(7)
2002–2003	Ballymena United	14	(0)
2003–2005	Brantwood		
Total		432+	(96+)

International career
1990	Northern Ireland U21	1	(0)
1990	Northern Ireland U23	1	(0)
1994	Northern Ireland B	1	(0)

Managerial career
- 2000–2001: Bangor (player-manager)
- 2002–2003: Ballymena United (player-coach)
- 2005–2006: Newry City
- 2006–2007: Glentoran
- 2007–2008: Bangor
- 2008–2012: Larne
- * Club domestic league appearances and goals

Paul William Millar (born 16 November 1966) is a Northern Irish former football player and coach.

As a player, he played in midfield and attack. He started at Glentoran, moving on to Portadown before signing with Port Vale in 1988. Three years later, he transferred to Cardiff City and helped the Welsh club to top the Third Division in 1992–93. In 1995, he left the Football League to return to Ireland, signing with Linfield and later returning to Wales to play for Bangor. He won youth caps for his country and also earned a Northern Ireland B cap.

As a manager, he was appointed manager of Bangor before moving on to Ballymena United. In 2005, he was made manager of Newry City, moving on to Glentoran the next season and then returning to the management position at Bangor in 2007. In 2008, he was appointed manager at Larne before he left the club in April 2012.

== Playing career ==
Millar started his career with Glentoran, and after scoring 15 goals in 28 appearances, he moved to Portadown. The young forward was selected as the Irish Young Footballer of the Year in 1986 and scored the winning goal in the final of the Irish Cup. He joined Port Vale in the English Third Division for £20,000 in December 1988. After playing just one reserve team game he seriously damaged his knee ligaments in training and after recovering finally made his debut at Vale Park in a 1–1 draw with Middlesbrough on 30 October 1989, coming on as a substitute. With Vale now competing in the Second Division he struggled to gain a place in the first-team and was loaned to Fourth Division side Hereford United in October 1990, returning to Vale the next month after two goals in five games at Edgar Street. Overall, he made 44 appearances for John Rudge's "Valiants", though most of these were as a substitute. He was sold to Cardiff City for £60,000 in August 1991.

He made over 100 appearances in four years under "Bluebirds" manager Eddie May. Cardiff missed out on the play-offs by three points in 1991–92, before winning promotion to the Second Division as Third Division champions in 1992–93. Avoiding relegation by two points in 1993–94, Cardiff were relegated in 1994–95 after finishing twelve points short of safety. At this point, Millar returned to Northern Ireland, signing with Linfield and then Portadown. He later became a player-manager, increasingly focussing on the management side of the game.

== Managerial career ==
Millar had player-manager roles at Bangor, Ballymena and Brantwood, where he gained his European A Coaching Licence. He took up a full-time managerial position at IFA Premiership side Newry City in November 2005, getting the club into the top six in his first season.

Following the resignation of Roy Coyle, he was appointed as the manager of Glentoran in February 2006. Manager of the month in March 2006, he picked up the award for a second-successive month after "Glens" secured second place in the league. The 2006–07 season started with Millar's side clear at the top. A slump in the second half of the season saw them runners-up in the league for the second successive season. He was sacked in May 2007 after just 16 months in the job, he claimed he could "leave with his head held high" after securing a UEFA Cup spot. A week later he returned to Bangor, but quit that post in May 2008 after claiming an eight-match suspension handed to him by the Irish Football Association hindered his ability to manage the club.

He was appointed as manager of IFA Championship side Larne in December 2008. He led the Inver Park club to eighth and ninth-place finishes in 2008–09, 2009–10 and 2010–11. On 16 January 2010, fighting broke about between Larne and Newry City players and coaching staff, and Millar was sent off. An IFA Commission was set up to investigate the brawl, and Millar was handed a four-game ban, whilst the club were fined £1,200 and Larne player Anthony Lagan was suspended for the rest of the season. Newry chairman Paul McKenna condemned the lenient punishments, stating that the commission "bottled it", though the IFA ruled that they "acted fully in line with regulations and procedures". The fixture was abandoned and Newry were awarded a 2–1 victory. Larne finished tenth in 2011–12, and Millar resigned in April 2012 to take up the position as Gary Hamilton's assistant at Glenavon. After seven years at the club, Millar departed Glenavon on 2 April 2019 and returned to Glentoran as new manager Mick McDermott's assistant. McDermott praised Millar when he picked up the Manager of the Month award for December 2021. McDermott was relived of his duties in January 2023. Millar remained as the club's sporting director.

== Personal life ==
His son, Philip, died from a drug overdose in 2017.

== Career statistics ==
Appearances and goals by club, season and competition
Club	Season	League			FA Cup		Other		Total	
Club	Season	Division	Apps	Goals	Apps	Goals	Apps	Goals	Apps	Goals
Port Vale	1988–89	Third Division	0	0	0	0	0	0	0	0
Port Vale	1989–90	Second Division	23	4	2	0	1	0	26	4
Port Vale	1990–91	Second Division	17	1	0	0	1	0	18	1
Port Vale	Total		40	5	2	0	2	0	44	5
Hereford United (loan)	1990–91	Fourth Division	5	2	0	0	0	0	5	2
Cardiff City	1991–92	Fourth Division	15	0	1	0	4	2	20	2
Cardiff City	1992–93	Third Division	33	3	1	1	4	1	38	5
Cardiff City	1993–94	Second Division	37	7	6	0	6	0	49	7
Cardiff City	1994–95	Second Division	35	7	1	0	4	0	40	7
Cardiff City	Total		120	17	9	1	18	3	147	21

== Honours ==
=== As a player ===
Glentoran

- Irish Cup: 1986

Cardiff City

- Football League Third Division: 1992–93

Individual

- Irish Young Footballer of the Year: 1986

=== As a manager ===
Individual

- Northern Ireland Football Writers' Manager of the Month: March 2006, April 2006
