= Glenn Naylor =

English footballer

Personal information
- Full name: Glenn Naylor
- Date of birth: 11 August 1972 (age 54)
- Place of birth: Howden, England
- Height: 5 ft 11 in (1.80 m)
- Position: Striker

Senior career*
Years	Team	Apps	(Gls)
1990–1996	York City	111	(30)
1995	→ Darlington (loan)	4	(1)
1996–2003	Darlington	209	(45)
- * Club domestic league appearances and goals

Glenn Naylor (born 11 August 1972) is an English former footballer who made more than 300 appearances in the Football League playing for York City and Darlington. He was forced to retire in 2003 due to injury.

== Career ==
Naylor played as a left back at school, but became a prolific striker in junior football and progressed under York City's Youth Training Scheme.
