= Jimmy Gardner (footballer) =

Scottish footballer (Veteran Trackman)

Jimmy Garner
Personal information
- Full name: James Gardner
- Date of birth: 27 September 1967 (age 59)
- Place of birth: Dunfermline, Scotland
- Height: 1.78 m (5 ft 10 in)
- Position: Left wing

Youth career
- 1986–1987: Ayresome North

Senior career*
Years	Team	Apps	(Gls)
1987–1988	Queen's Park	2	(0)
1988–1993	Motherwell	16	(0)
1993–1995	St Mirren	41	(1)
1995	Scarborough	6	(1)
1995–1997	Cardiff City	63	(5)
1997–1999	Exeter City	50	(1)
1999–2001	Stirling Albion	48	(3)
2001–2002	Arbroath	9	(0)
2002–????	Shettleston		
- * Club domestic league appearances and goals

James Francis Gardner (born 27 September 1967) is a Scottish former professional football winger.

A product of non-league Ayresome North, Gardner signed for amateur Scottish Football League club Queen's Park in April 1987. He moved on to Motherwell in the summer of 1987 but made only 16 league appearances in five years with the club. He joined St Mirren in September 1993 before moving to the English Football League, initially with Scarborough and then Cardiff City and Exeter City. He returned to Scottish league football in 1999 to play for Stirling Albion and then Arbroath before finishing with non-league Shettleston.
