= Neil Matthews (footballer, born 1966) =

English footballer (1966–2023)

Personal information
- Full name: Neil Matthews
- Date of birth: 19 September 1966
- Place of birth: Grimsby, England
- Date of death: 8 May 2023 (aged 56)
- Place of death: Calderdale, England
- Position: Forward

Youth career
- Grimsby Town

Senior career*
| Years | Team | Apps | (Gls) |
| 1984–1987 | Grimsby Town | 11 | (1) |
| 1985 | → Scunthorpe United (loan) | 1 | (0) |
| 1986 | → Halifax Town (loan) | 9 | (2) |
| 1987 | → Bolton Wanderers (loan) | 1 | (0) |
| 1987–1990 | Halifax Town | 105 | (29) |
| 1990–1992 | Stockport County | 33 | (15) |
| 1991 | → Halifax Town (loan) | 3 | (0) |
| 1992–1995 | Lincoln City | 83 | (20) |
| 1994 | → Bury (loan) | 3 | (1) |
| – | Dagenham & Redbridge | 3 | (2) |
| – | Gainsborough Trinity | | |
| 199?–1998 | Guiseley | | |
| 1998–2001 | Leigh RMI (Note: Infobox figures include appearances and goals in Football Conference only.) | 13 | (2) |
| 2001 | Chorley | | |
- * Club domestic league appearances and goals

Neil Matthews (19 September 1966 – 8 May 2023) was an English professional football player and coach.

== Playing career ==
As a forward, Matthews scored 68 goals from 258 appearances in the lower divisions of the Football League. He played for Grimsby Town, Scunthorpe United, Halifax Town, Bolton Wanderers, Stockport County, Lincoln City and Bury, before moving into non-league football. Matthews played in the Football Conference for Dagenham & Redbridge and Leigh RMI, and in the Northern Premier League for Gainsborough Trinity, Guiseley, Leigh RMI and Chorley.

== Coaching career ==
A back problem caused his retirement from playing football in 2001, after which he joined the staff of Huddersfield Town's youth academy.

After working with their youth team, he became Bradford City's Academy Manager in September 2019.

== Death ==
Matthews died from cancer in May 2023, at the age of 56.
