= Shaun Chapple =

Welsh footballer

Personal information
- Full name: Shaun Ronald Chapple
- Date of birth: 14 February 1973 (age 53)
- Place of birth: Swansea, Wales
- Position: Midfielder

Senior career*
Years	Team	Apps	(Gls)
1991–1997	Swansea City	107	(9)
1997	Merthyr Tydfil		
1998–2000	Forest Green Rovers		
2000–2001	Newport County		
2001	Carmarthen Town		

International career
1992	Wales B	1	(1)
- * Club domestic league appearances and goals

Shaun Ronald Chapple (born 14 February 1973) is a Welsh former footballer who played in the Football League for Swansea City.

On 18 March 1992, Chapple represented Wales B at The Racecourse in Wrexham against a Canada Olympic XI
