= Owen Pickard =

English footballer and manager

Personal information
- Date of birth: 18 November 1969 (age 56)
- Place of birth: Barnstaple, England
- Position: Striker

Team information
- Current team: Barnstaple Town (manager)

Senior career*
Years	Team	Apps	(Gls)
1988–1992	Plymouth Argyle	16	(1)
1992–1994	Hereford United	73	(14)
1994–1997	Dorchester Town	115	(102)
1997–1999	Yeovil Town	63	(27)
1999-2001	Dorchester Town	0	(0)
2001-2003	Bideford	0	(0)
Total		152	(42)

Managerial career
- 2008–: Barnstaple Town
- * Club domestic league appearances and goals

Owen Pickard is a football striker with football league experience at Plymouth Argyle and Hereford United. He is the manager of Barnstaple Town. He kept them in the Toolstation Western League in the 09/10 season with a 4–0 win over Melkshan Town FC. The starting line up was Lloyd Irish, Michael Broome, Jamie Frickleton, Steve Shore, Paul Quinn, Eugenio Da Veiga, Andrew Rogers, Shane Tolley, Marcus Mahoney, Ryan Turner, Stan Paxton.
