= Chris Ingram (footballer) =

Welsh footballer

Personal information
- Full name: Christopher David Ingram
- Date of birth: 5 December 1976 (age 49)
- Place of birth: Cardiff, Wales
- Position: Winger

Senior career*
Years	Team	Apps	(Gls)
1995–1997	Cardiff City	8	(1)
- Merthyr Tydfil
- Cambrian & Clydach Vale
- * Club domestic league appearances and goals

Christopher David Ingram (born 5 December 1976) is a Welsh former professional footballer who played as a winger. He made eight appearances for Cardiff City in the Football League, scoring on his home debut against Mansfield Town. He later played for Merthyr Tydfil and Cambrian & Clydach Vale.
