= Nathan Wigg =

Welsh footballer (born 1974)

Personal information
- Full name: Nathan Marlow Wigg
- Date of birth: 27 September 1974 (age 52)
- Place of birth: Newport, Wales
- Position: Midfielder

Senior career*
Years	Team	Apps	(Gls)
1993–1996	Cardiff City	58	(1)
1996–1997	Merthyr Tydfil		
1997	Dundalk		
1997–1998	Ebbw Vale	20	(1)
1998–1999	Forest Green Rovers	32	(0)
1999–2000	Gloucester City	20	(0)
2000–2003	Cwmbrân Town	77	(3)
2003–2004	Port Talbot Town	31	(0)
2004	Llanelli	1	(0)
- * Club domestic league appearances and goals

Nathan Marlow Wigg (born 27 September 1974) is a Welsh former professional footballer. He began his professional career with Cardiff City, making more than fifty appearances in the Football League for the club, before playing for numerous non-league and Welsh Premier League clubs.

== Career ==
Born in Newport, Wigg began his career in the youth system of Cwmbrân Town before joining Cardiff City after impressing manager Eddie May. He made his professional debut during a 2–2 draw with Brighton & Hove Albion in August 1993 as a substitute in place of Derek Brazil. He went on to make over 50 appearances in the Football League for Cardiff before being released in 1996.

After a brief spell with Merthyr Tydfil, Wigg joined Irish side Dundalk who were managed by Eddie May. However, May left the club before the start of the 1997–98 season and was replaced by Jim McLaughlin. After less than three months with Dundalk, he left the club in November 1997 after his contract was cancelled by mutual consent. He instead returned to Wales and played the remainder of the season with Welsh Premier League side Ebbw Vale before joining Conference National club Forest Green Rovers in 1998. He spent one season with Forest Green, making 41 appearances in all competitions and reaching the final of the FA Trophy.

After spending the 1999–2000 season at Gloucester City, he returned to Cwmbrân Town in the Welsh Premier League where he spent three seasons before spells with Port Talbot Town and Llanelli. In 2008, Wigg retired from football after suffering from persistent knee and calf injuries during his time with Risca United. Having undergone a leg scan, Wigg's knee was described as looking like it "could have been in a car crash". He stayed with Risca as assistant manager to Jeff Eckhardt.
