= Andy Scott (footballer, born 1975) =

English footballer

Personal information
- Full name: Andrew Michael Scott
- Date of birth: 27 June 1975 (age 51)
- Place of birth: Manchester, England
- Position: Full back

Senior career*
Years	Team	Apps	(Gls)
1993–1994	Blackburn Rovers	0	(0)
1994–1997	Cardiff City	16	(1)
1997–1998	Rochdale	3	(0)
- * Club domestic league appearances and goals

Andrew Michael Scott (born 27 June 1975) is an English former professional footballer who played as a full back. He made nineteen appearances in the Football League during spells with Cardiff City and Rochdale.
