= Ryan Nicholls =

Welsh footballer

Personal information
- Full name: Ryan Rhys Nicholls
- Date of birth: 10 May 1973 (age 53)
- Place of birth: Cardiff, Wales
- Positions: Midfielder; striker

Youth career
- 1988–1991: Leeds United

Senior career*
Years	Team	Apps	(Gls)
1991–1995	Leeds United	0	(0)
1994	→ Strømsgodset (loan)	4	(0)
1995	Cardiff City	12	(2)
1995–1996	Merthyr Tydfil		
1996–1999	Aberystwyth Town	64	(27)
1999–2003	Carmarthen Town	108	(34)

Managerial career
- 2004–2007: Pontypridd Town
- * Club domestic league appearances and goals

Ryan Rhys Nicholls (born 10 May 1973) is a Welsh former professional footballer who played as a midfielder or striker.

== Career ==
=== Leeds United ===
Born in Cardiff, Nicholls began his career at Leeds United, joining the Yorkshire club at the age of 12. He signed professional terms with the club in 1988 but tore his contract up the following day after becoming unhappy when the club sacked manager Billy Bremner. Nicholls planned to instead join Luton Town who had also expressed an interest in offering him a professional contract and had several other Welsh players in their squad but the following day, Nicholls was visited by Bremner's replacement Howard Wilkinson who eventually persuaded him to return to Elland Road and remain with the club.

He began training with the first team at the start of the 1989–90 season and roomed with Vinnie Jones for the first six months of his time with the squad. After impressing in the club's reserve side, Nicholls was tipped to make his debut for the senior side but suffered a cruciate ligament injury. The injury was originally misdiagnosed by the club's medical staff and he was put back into reserve team action after just three months and further damaged the ligament when attempting a tackle. After visiting a specialist in Cambridge, Nicholls was ruled out for a year. He was given an extension to his contract to prove his fitness but suffered a second serious injury soon after his return after tackling Gary McAllister in training that ruled him out for another six months. On his return, he joined Norwegian side Strømsgodset on loan in a bid to play football and earn a new deal but was released on his return to the club.

=== Later career ===
Nicholls spent two weeks on trial with Bristol City and was set to join the club until manager Russell Osman was sacked. He instead joined his hometown side Cardiff City on a non-contract basis. He made his debut in a 1–0 defeat to Blackpool and he made twelve appearances, scoring twice, but was released at the end of the season and joined Merthyr Tydfil, after turning down a move to Lincoln City.

After spending one year at Merthyr, Nicholls moved into the Welsh Premier League with spells at Aberystwyth Town and Carmarthen Town.

== Management career ==
In November 2004, Nicholls took over as manager of Pontypridd Town where he spent two and a half years in charge before resigning in June 2007. Ryan now currently owns Quest fitness gym in Caerphilly.
