= Ian Jones (Welsh footballer) =

German-born Welsh footballer

Personal information
- Full name: Ian Michael Jones
- Date of birth: 26 August 1976 (age 50)
- Place of birth: West Germany

Senior career*
Years	Team	Apps	(Gls)
1993–1996	Cardiff City	3	(0)

International career
- Wales Youth
- * Club domestic league appearances and goals

Ian Michael Jones (born 26 August 1976) is a Welsh former footballer who played as a defender for Cardiff City. He made three appearances for the club in the Football League and also played for Wales at youth level. He subsequently joined non-league Merthyr Tydfil.
