= Phil Stant =

English footballer and manager (born 1962)

Personal information
- Full name: Philip Richard Stant
- Date of birth: 13 October 1962 (age 64)
- Place of birth: Bolton, England
- Position: Striker

Senior career*
Years	Team	Apps	(Gls)
1981–1982	Camberley Town		
1982–1983	Reading	4	(2)
1986–1989	Hereford United	89	(38)
1989–1991	Notts County	22	(6)
1990	→ Blackpool (loan)	12	(5)
1990	→ Lincoln City (loan)	4	(0)
1991	→ Huddersfield Town (loan)	5	(1)
1991	Fulham	19	(5)
1991–1993	Mansfield Town	57	(32)
1993–1995	Cardiff City	79	(34)
1993	→ Mansfield Town (loan)	4	(1)
1995–1997	Bury	62	(23)
1996	→ Northampton Town (loan)	5	(2)
1997–2001	Lincoln City	64	(20)
2001	Brighton & Hove Albion	7	(1)
2001–2002	Worcester City	15	(7)
2002	Dover Athletic	4	(0)
2002	Hayes	3	(0)
2002	Hinckley United	7	(2)
2002–2003	Gainsborough Trinity	28	(13)
2003–2004	Ilkeston Town	10	(1)
Total		500	(193)

Managerial career
- 2000–2001: Lincoln City
- 2002–2003: Gainsborough Trinity
- 2003–2005: Ilkeston Town
- * Club domestic league appearances and goals

Philip Richard Stant (born 13 October 1962) is an English football manager, former professional footballer and British Army soldier who served in the Falklands War and was attached to the SAS.

As a player he was a striker who after serving in the Army he entered professional football at the relatively late age of 24 but went on to score over 150 times in the Football League, most notably for Hereford United, Mansfield Town, Cardiff City and Lincoln City. He also played professionally for Reading, Notts County, Blackpool, Huddersfield Town, Fulham, Bury, Northampton Town and Brighton & Hove Albion. He spent his formative years in Non-League football for Worcester City, Dover Athletic, Hayes and Hinckley United. He initially managed Lincoln City between 2000 and 2001 whilst continuing as a player and also had similar spells in charge of Gainsborough Trinity and Ilkeston Town.

== Military career ==
Stant joined the army as a teenager and was billeted at Aldershot Garrison for his training and played for local non-League club Camberley Town. In 1982, at the age of just 18, Stant was sent to the Falkland Islands as part of operations of the Falklands War, serving with 5 Infantry Brigade as part of 81 Ordnance Coy. He was deployed to the South Atlantic aboard the Queen Elizabeth 2, a journey that lasted three weeks and included stops in Sierra Leone and Ascension Island before arriving in the South Atlantic, landing on South Georgia.

During his time in the conflict, Stant was witness to the Bluff Cove Air Attacks, having been aboard RFA Sir Tristram earlier in the day. He had been ordered off the ship the day before to man a nearby trench in Port Pleasant. There he was witness to the Argentinian aerial attack on the two warships and was one of the first on the scene afterwards where he helped wounded soldiers. Stant has described his experiences in the aftermath as "the day I grew up" due to the injuries he witnessed. He remained on the island until July 1982, a month after the end of the hostilities there.

He progressed into the SAS and also worked as part of a bomb disposal unit before turning his attentions to football. His experiences in the South Atlantic were the subject of a 2007 ITV documentary, "Falklands 25: A soldier's story".

== Playing career ==
A fan of home town team Bolton Wanderers, his games in The Football League came with Hereford United, although he scored twice in four games for Reading in the 1982–83 season. Bought out of the Army by Hereford for £600, Stant went on to score 38 times in 89 League appearances for the Bulls, including 28 in 1988–89, before he secured a £175,000 move to Notts County.

He played 22 times (six goals) for the Magpies and after loan spells with Blackpool, Lincoln City and Huddersfield Town he joined Fulham for £60,000 in February 1991.

Six months later he was on the move again, scoring 26 goals for Mansfield Town as the Stags won promotion from the Fourth Division, and in December 1992, was transferred £100,000 to Cardiff City.

Stant averaged a goal every other game during his three seasons at Ninian Park, including a hat-trick in the 1993 Welsh Cup final win over Rhyl, before it was Bury's turn to experience his goalscoring talents and it was from the Shakers where City purchased him for £30,000 in December 1996 where in two seasons scored 23 goals in 62 appearances.

He then moved to Lincoln City where he marked his second arrival at Sincil Bank by scoring 16 goals in 22 matches during the second half of the 1996–97 season and whilst the goals dried up the following campaign, he still played his part as the Club gained promotion on the final day of the season, assisting caretaker-manager Shane Westley in the latter half of the season.

In the Second Division campaign the following year, Stant made five substitute appearances in all competitions as he concentrated on assisting Westley and chairman John Reames, who took over as manager in November 1998. In May 2000, Reames handed the managerial reins over to Stant, who came off the bench a further 19 times in the 1999–2000 season.

Stant lasted 30 matches as Imps' boss and, four days after the Lincoln City Membership Scheme's Community Ownership Package for the shareholding of the club was successful, the new board of directors terminated the contracts of Stant and his assistant George Foster, with former Grimsby Town boss Alan Buckley coming in as his successor. A short-term playing contract at Brighton & Hove Albion followed.

== Coaching career ==
Following his departure from Brighton, Stant joined Worcester City. He enjoyed a fruitful spell with the club, scoring a hat-trick in the 4–2 victory over Tiverton Town on 20 October 2001 and going on to notch a total of 12 goals in 23 appearances before moving on to Dover Athletic. After four appearances for Dover, Stant moved on for a brief sojourn at Hayes which saw him make three appearances in a week long stay before finishing the season at Hinckley United, linking up with one-time Notts County colleague Dean Thomas and scoring twice in seven league appearances, as well as in the Leicestershire Challenge Cup Final.

In July 2002, Stant moved back into management, being appointed player-manager at Gainsborough Trinity. Stant enjoyed a successful season at the Northolme, leading the club to the fifth round of the FA Trophy whilst securing a mid-table league finish and winning the Lincolnshire Senior County Cup, but resigned at the end of the season due to work commitments.

In October 2003, Stant returned to management with Ilkeston Town, He would steer Ilkeston to promotion to the Northern Premier League Premier Division in the 2004–05 season but a disappointing start to their campaign at the higher level saw Stant resign from his post in September 2005.

== Other work in football ==
Stant runs the Newark & Sherwood College Football Academy and is a youth development monitor for the Football League.

== Career statistics ==
Appearances and goals by club, season and competition
Club	Season	League			FA Cup		League Cup		Other		Total	
Club	Season	Division	Apps	Goals	Apps	Goals	Apps	Goals	Apps	Goals	Apps	Goals
Reading	1982–83	Third Division	4	2	1	0	0	0	0	0	5	2
Hereford United	1986–87	Fourth Division	9	1	0	0	0	0	2	3	11	4
Hereford United	1987–88	Fourth Division	39	9	2	2	1	1	4	1	46	13
Hereford United	1988–89	Fourth Division	41	28	1	0	2	1	5	3	49	32
Hereford United	Total		89	38	3	2	3	2	11	7	106	49
Notts County	1989–90	Third Division	22	6	1	0	2	1	5	0	30	7
Notts County	1990–91	Second Division	0	0	0	0	0	0	0	0	0	0
Notts County	Total		22	6	1	0	2	1	5	0	30	7
Blackpool (loan)	1990–91	Fourth Division	12	5	0	0	0	0	0	0	12	5
Lincoln City (loan)	1990–91	Fourth Division	4	0	0	0	0	0	0	0	4	0
Huddersfield Town (loan)	1990–91	Third Division	5	1	0	0	0	0	0	0	5	1
Fulham (loan)	1990–91	Third Division	19	5	0	0	0	0	1	0	20	5
Mansfield Town	1991–92	Fourth Division	40	26	1	0	2	0	2	0	45	26
Mansfield Town	1992–93	Second Division	17	6	1	0	2	1	0	0	20	7
Mansfield Town	Total		57	32	2	0	4	1	2	0	65	33
Cardiff City	1992–93	Third Division	24	12	0	0	0	0	2	1	26	13
Cardiff City	1993–94	Second Division	36	10	6	4	0	0	4	2	46	16
Cardiff City	1994–95	Second Division	19	13	1	0	2	2	2	0	24	15
Cardiff City	Total		79	35	7	4	2	2	8	3	96	44
Mansfield Town (loan)	1993–94	Third Division	4	1	0	0	1	1	0	0	5	2
Bury	1994–95	Third Division	20	13	0	0	0	0	3	0	23	13
Bury	1995–96	Third Division	34	9	1	0	5	4	2	0	42	13
Bury	1996–97	Second Division	8	1	0	0	1	0	0	0	9	1
Bury	Total		62	23	1	0	6	4	5	0	74	27
Northampton Town (loan)	1996–97	Third Division	5	2	0	0	0	0	0	0	5	2
Lincoln City	1996–97	Third Division	22	15	0	0	0	0	1	0	23	15
Lincoln City	1997–98	Third Division	21	2	4	0	2	1	0	0	27	3
Lincoln City	1998–99	Second Division	3	0	1	0	0	0	1	0	5	0
Lincoln City	1999–2000	Third Division	18	3	3	0	1	0	0	0	22	3
Lincoln City	2000–01	Third Division	0	0	0	0	0	0	0	0	0	0
Lincoln City	Total		64	20	8	0	3	1	2	0	77	21
Brighton & Hove Albion	2000–01	Third Division	7	1	0	0	0	0	0	0	7	1
Worcester City	2001–02	SFL Premier Division	15	7	5	2	0	0	2	1	22	10
Dover Athletic	2001–02	Conference National	4	0	0	0	0	0	0	0	4	0
Hayes	2001–02	Conference National	3	0	0	0	0	0	0	0	3	0
Hinckley United	2001–02	SFL Premier Division	7	2	0	0	0	0	0	0	7	2
Gainsborough Trinity	2002–03	Northern Premier League	28	13	0	0	0	0	0	0	48	13
Ilkeston Town	2003–04	NPL First Division	10	1	0	0	0	0	0	0	10	1
Career total			500	193	28	8	21	12	36	11	585	224

== Honours ==
Cardiff City

- Football League Third Division: 1992–93
- Welsh Cup: 1992–93

Individual

- PFA Team of the Year: 1988–89 Fourth Division, 1991–92 Fourth Division
