= Darren Adams =

English footballer (born 1974)

Personal information
- Full name: Darren Steven Adams
- Date of birth: 12 January 1974 (age 52)
- Place of birth: Bromley, England
- Height: 5 ft 7 in (1.70 m)
- Position: Forward

Senior career*
Years	Team	Apps	(Gls)
1992–1993	Cray Wanderers	2	(0)
1993–1994	Danson Furness	?	(?)
1994–1996	Cardiff City	34	(4)
1996	→ Woking (loan)	7	(3)
1996–1997	Aldershot Town	33	(13)
1997–1999	Dover Athletic	58	(15)
1999–2000	Hampton & Richmond Borough	?	(?)
2000	Welling United	18	(6)
2000–2001	Fisher Athletic	?	(?)
2001–2005	Erith & Belvedere	?	(?)
- * Club domestic league appearances and goals

Darren Steven Adams (born 12 January 1974) is an English former professional footballer who played in the Football League as a forward.

== Career ==
After making a couple of appearances for Cray Wanderers, Adams was playing for Cray's Kent League rivals Danson Furness when he was offered a contract with Cardiff City in January 1994. He made his debut soon after in a 0–0 draw with Barnet on 22 January as a substitute in place of Tony Bird. He was handed a start in the club's following game and scored his first goal during a 5–1 victory over Wrexham. He played a total of 34 league games for the club, in several different positions, but fell out of favour in 1996 and was loaned out to Woking before being released at the end of the season.

He joined Aldershot Town, making his debut against Bognor Regis Town in August 1996. Adams spent seven months at the Recreation Ground before Dover Athletic paid £3,000 to sign him in February 1997.
