= Nick Richardson =

English footballer (born 1967)

Personal information
- Full name: Nicholas John Richardson
- Date of birth: 11 April 1967 (age 59)
- Place of birth: Halifax, England
- Position: Midfielder

Senior career*
Years	Team	Apps	(Gls)
1988–1992	Halifax Town	101	(17)
1992–1995	Cardiff City	111	(13)
1994	→ Wrexham (loan)	4	(2)
1994	→ Chester City (loan)	6	(1)
1995	Bury	5	(0)
1995–2001	Chester City	175	(12)
2001–2002	York City	39	(1)
2002–2003	Harrogate Town	8	(0)
2003	Spennymoor United	0	(0)
2003	Ossett Town	?	(?)
2003–2004	Frickley Athletic	28	(1)
Total		477	(47)
- * Club domestic league appearances and goals

Nicholas John Richardson (born 11 April 1967) is an English former professional footballer, who played in the Football League between the 1980s and 2000s.

== Halifax and Cardiff ==
Born in Halifax, Yorkshire, Richardson began his career playing non-league football for Emley before joining Halifax Town in 1988. He quickly established himself in the side and was a regular for three and a half seasons before signing for Cardiff City for £35,000. During his first season he won both a Division Three title and a Welsh Cup winners medal, after the Bluebirds beat Rhyl 5–0 in the final.

He had loan spells at Wrexham and Chester City,

== Bury and Chester ==
He left to join Bury in 1995 where he spent just one month before moving permanently to Chester City for £40,000.

== Later career ==
Richardson returned to The Football League with York City for a year before joining Harrogate Town. After 9 years as a qualified Computing and IT teacher he now runs a business AIM-FOR along with his brother Lee also a former professional footballer.

== Personal life ==
Nick's younger brother Lee was also a footballer and played alongside him during his time at Halifax.

== Honours ==
Cardiff City

- Football League Third Division: 1992–93
