= Andy Evans (footballer) =

Welsh footballer and manager

Personal information
- Full name: David Andrew Evans
- Date of birth: 25 November 1975 (age 50)
- Place of birth: Aberystwyth, Wales
- Position: Striker

Senior career*
Years	Team	Apps	(Gls)
1993–1995	Cardiff City	15	(0)
1995–1996	Merthyr Tydfil		
1996–1999	Aberystwyth Town	74	(25)
1999–2001	Barnsley	0	(0)
2000	→ Mansfield Town (loan)	6	(0)
2000	→ Chester City (loan)		
2001	Stalybridge Celtic	3	(0)
2001–2003	Frickley Athletic	57	(17)
2003	→ Wakefield & Emley (loan)	2	(0)
2003–2004	Belper Town		
2004	Ilkeston Town	13	(4)
2004	Ossett Town	1	(0)
2004–2005	Aberystwyth Town	2	(0)
2005–2006	Frickley Athletic	49	(12)
2006–2010	Aberystwyth Town	82	(19)
2010	Porthmadog	2	(0)
2010–2012	Carmarthen Town	0	(0)

International career
	1Wales U21	1	(0)

Managerial career
- 2017–2023: Penparcau
- 2023: Llanidloes Town (assistant)
- 2023–2024: Llanidloes Town
- * Club domestic league appearances and goals

David Andrew Evans (born 25 November 1975) is a Welsh manager and former professional footballer.

A trainee with Cardiff City, where he won a Welsh Under-21 cap, before drifting through Merthyr Tydfil and Ebbw Vale to Aberystwyth and a job as a postman. At Park Avenue he immediately attracted the interest of First Division Barnsley and a £15,000 transfer fee. But, after just two appearances, he was loaned out to Mansfield Town and Chester City before being allowed to join Stalybridge Celtic, then on to Frickley Athletic, Belper Town and Ossett Town. He rejoined the Seasiders in summer 2006 from Frickley

In 2010 he joined Porthmadog.
