= Derek Brazil =

Irish former professional footballer

Personal information
- Full name: Derek Michael Brazil
- Date of birth: 14 December 1968 (age 57)
- Place of birth: Dublin, Republic of Ireland
- Height: 6 ft 0 in (1.83 m)
- Position: Defender

Youth career
- Rivermount Boys
- 1986–1988: Manchester United

Senior career*
Years	Team	Apps	(Gls)
1988–1992	Manchester United	2	(0)
1990	→ Oldham Athletic (loan)	1	(0)
1991	→ Swansea City (loan)	12	(1)
1992–1996	Cardiff City	115	(1)
1996–1998	Newport County	75	(8)
1998–1999	Inter Cardiff	27	(0)
1999–2000	Haverfordwest County	42	(6)
2024–2024	Trethomas Bluebirds Reserves		

International career
1986–1989	Republic of Ireland U21	7	(0)
1989–1990	Republic of Ireland U23	2	(0)

Managerial career
- 2006–2010: Haverfordwest County
- 2011: Haverfordwest County
- 2011–2012: Goytre United
- 2018–2019: Pontypridd Town (coach)
- * Club domestic league appearances and goals

Derek Michael Brazil (born 14 December 1968) is an Irish former professional footballer. During his career he made over 200 appearances in the Football League and represented Ireland at youth and B levels. After being spotted playing football in his home country, Brazil joined the youth system at Manchester United, making two league appearances for the first-team, and later captained the club's reserve side.

He spent time away from Old Trafford on loan at Oldham Athletic and Swansea City before leaving the club on a permanent basis in August 1992, joining Cardiff City for a fee of £85,000. In his first season at Ninian Park, he helped the side win the Third Division title and the Welsh Cup and went on to make over 100 appearances for the club before moving into non-league football in 1996 with Newport County.

== Personal life ==
Raised in Finglas, the Brazil family were keen sportsmen. His father was a champion boxer and footballer. His younger brother Stephen won numerous titles with Home Farm and played League of Ireland for Bohs. However a knee injury ended his career prematurely. His brother Geoffrey, also played ball for Dunsink YC, but an achilles tendon injury put him out of the game.

== Club career ==
=== Manchester United ===
A defender, Brazil began his career with Rivermount Boys Club and had represented Ireland at various youth levels. After being rejected by West Ham United, Brazil had received an offer to join fellow London based club Chelsea and was set to join them after representing Ireland in a youth international against England at Elland Road. After the match, he was informed that Manchester United scout Eric Harrison had attended the game. He also received an offer from United's local rivals Manchester City and spent three days at each club before being persuaded to join United, the team his father supported, after meeting several members of the first team, including Paul McGrath and Norman Whiteside, despite being offered double his wages by City.

He played in a friendly match between the Ireland under-18 side and the Manchester United first-team and was tasked with marking Frank Stapleton. Despite Stapleton scoring a hat-trick in the match, Brazil was offered a three-and-a-half-year contract by manager Ron Atkinson. Brazil later stated: "He (Atkinson) told me I'd played really well because Frank could have scored ten but I'd made so many tackles." He signed a contract with Manchester United in March 1986 at the age of 17. During his time at Old Trafford, Atkinson was replaced as manager by Alex Ferguson and he later handed Brazil his debut as a substitute during a 2–1 defeat to Everton on 10 May 1989. His only other appearance for United was a second substitute appearance, replacing Viv Anderson during a 2–1 victory over Millwall 10 months later on 10 February 1990. Brazil frequently became homesick in Manchester and was regularly allowed to return home for several days by Ferguson.

During his time at Old Trafford, he spent time on loan with Oldham Athletic and Swansea City, joining the Swans in September 1991 and playing 12 league matches at Vetch Field before returning to Manchester. Swansea had expressed an interest in making the deal permanent but were unable to afford the £250,000 price tag that United had quoted.

=== Cardiff City ===
In August 1992, at the age of 23, Brazil joined Cardiff City on a permanent basis for a fee of £85,000. In his first season at Ninian Park, 1992–93, he was part of the side that won the Division Three title and the Welsh Cup, defeating Rhyl 5–0 in the final. He went on to make over 100 appearances for the Bluebirds during a four-year spell at the club.

After struggling with injuries, Brazil dropped out of professional football, joining Newport County before moving into the Welsh Premier League with spells at Inter Cardiff and Haverfordwest County.

== Managerial career ==
Brazil later worked as a development officer for Cardiff City. Having passed his coaching badges earlier in his career at the age of 27, in October 2006, Brazil was appointed team manager of Haverfordwest, replacing Deryn Brace. He was dismissed in November 2010 following disappointing results at the start of the 2010 season.

However, in a strange turn of events, his successor as manager, Gavin Chesterfield, resigned due to complicated work commitments. The Haverfordwest board were thus left with no alternative than to reinstate Brazil in late February 2011. Brazil expressed his amazement at his reinsation. Regarding the whole debacle, he added in a Western Telegraph article: "in hindsight, it was probably the right one for both parties. It has given me valuable time to spend with my family and I have certainly been able to recharge my batteries. I now feel determined and with unfinished business to complete I have much more to give as a manager." His second spell as manager of the club ended in May 2011 after the relegation of the club from the Welsh Premiership.

In September 2011, he took over as manager of Welsh Football League side Goytre United, following the sacking of Robert Cooke, winning his first match in charge against Cwmaman Institute. He left the club after one year in charge.

He also runs his own business teaching physical education and coaching football around the Cardiff area.

In July 2008, Brazil wore the United jersey again, when he took part in the Legends XI tournament in Northern Ireland. Brazil has enjoyed a successful career in football and is still playing today.

== Honours ==
Cardiff City

- Football League Third Division: 1992–93
- Welsh Cup: 1993
