= Lee Baddeley =

Welsh footballer (born 1974)

Personal information
- Full name: Lee Matthew Baddeley
- Date of birth: 12 July 1974 (age 52)
- Place of birth: Cardiff, Wales
- Position: Defender

Youth career
- Cardiff City

Senior career*
Years	Team	Apps	(Gls)
1990–1997	Cardiff City	133	(1)
1997–1999	Exeter City	66	(1)
2000–????	Merthyr Tydfil		

International career
1995	Wales U21	2	(0)
- * Club domestic league appearances and goals

Lee Matthew Baddeley (born 12 July 1974) is a Welsh former professional footballer. He made over 150 appearances in the Football League for Cardiff City and Exeter City.

== Career ==
Baddeley began his career at his hometown club Cardiff City as a YTS trainee, making his debut on 24 November 1990 away to Gillingham, breaking the record of John Toshack, as the youngest to play for Cardiff City. He eventually managed to establish himself in the side during the 1993–94 season and scored his only goal for the Bluebirds against Brighton in November 1994. After again falling down the pecking order at Ninian Park he decided to leave the club and moved to Exeter City in February 1997. However his time at the club was blighted by a persistent hamstring injury which meant he struggled to retain fitness. He was eventually forced to retire from injury in 1999 and, despite an attempted comeback in 2000, he eventually finished his career after a spell at Merthyr Tydfil.

== After football ==
Following his retirement, Baddeley took a job as a trainee greenkeeper at a golf course in Exeter and obtained a Foundation Degree in Sports Turf Science and Management.
