= 1989 Football League Fourth Division play-off final =

Association football match

- Event: 1988–89 Football League Fourth Division
Wrexham	Leyton Orient
1	2
- on aggregate

First leg
Wrexham	Leyton Orient
0	0
- Date: 30 May 1989
- Venue: Racecourse Ground, Wrexham
- Attendance: 7,915

Second leg
Leyton Orient	Wrexham
2	1
- Date: 3 June 1989
- Venue: Brisbane Road, Leyton
- Attendance: 13,355

The 1989 Football League Fourth Division play-off final was an association football match played over two legs between Wrexham and Leyton Orient on 30 May and 3 June 1989. The final was to determine the fourth and final team to gain promotion from the Football League Fourth Division, the fourth tier of English football, to the Third Division. The top three teams of the 1988–89 Football League Fourth Division season, Rotherham United, Tranmere Rovers and Crewe Alexandra, gained automatic promotion to the Third Division, while those placed from fourth to seventh in the league competed in the play-offs. The winners of the play-off semi-finals played against each other for the final place in the Third Division for the 1989–90 season. Leyton Orient ended the season in sixth position, one place ahead of Wrexham, while Scarborough and Scunthorpe United were the other semi-finalists.

The first leg of the final was played at the Racecourse Ground in Wrexham and ended goalless. The second leg took place at Brisbane Road in Leyton four days later and a minute before half-time, Leyton Orient took the lead when Lee Harvey struck the ball past Mike Salmon in the Wrexham goal from the right of the penalty area. One minute into the second half, Jon Bowden equalised for Wrexham when he was unmarked at the near post and headed in a cross. With eight minutes of the match remaining, Mark Cooper received the ball from Harvey before swivelling and striking it past Salmon to make it 2–1. Leyton Orient won the match and tie, and were promoted to the Third Division.

Leyton Orient's next season saw them finish in fourteenth position in the Third Division. Wrexham ended their following season in 21st place in the Fourth Division.

== Route to the final ==
Football League Fourth Division final table, leading positions
Pos	Team	Pld	W	D	L	GF	GA	GD	Pts
1	Rotherham United	46	22	16	8	76	35	+41	82
2	Tranmere Rovers	46	21	17	8	62	43	+19	80
3	Crewe Alexandra	46	21	15	10	67	48	+19	78
4	Scunthorpe United	46	21	14	11	77	57	+20	77
5	Scarborough	46	21	14	11	67	52	+15	77
6	Leyton Orient	46	21	12	13	86	50	+36	75
7	Wrexham	46	19	14	13	77	63	+14	71

Leyton Orient finished the regular 1988–89 season in sixth position in the Football League Fourth Division – the fourth tier of the English football league system – one place and four points ahead of Wrexham. Both missed out on the three automatic places for promotion to the Third Division and instead took part in the play-offs, along with Scunthorpe United and Scarborough, to determine the fourth promoted team. Leyton Orient finished three points behind Crewe Alexandra (who were promoted in third place), five behind Tranmere Rovers (promoted as runners-up) and seven behind league winners Rotherham United.

Wrexham's opposition for their play-off semi-final were Scunthorpe United and the first match of the two-legged tie was held at the Racecourse Ground in Wrexham on 21 May 1989. Darren Wright put the home side into the lead after two minutes when he scored from a free kick. David Cowling then equalised for Scunthorpe with a mishit cross from around 30 yards (27 m). Ollie Kearns scored twice, each time with a header, to give Wrexham a 3–1 victory. The second leg took place four days later at Glanford Park in Scunthorpe. Kevin Russell gave the visitors the lead in the first half before Scunthorpe lost both Paul Nicol and Cowling to injury. Russell then scored his and Wrexham's second goal, giving them a 2–0 win and a 5–1 aggregate victory to see them progress to the final.

Leyton Orient faced Scarborough in the other semi-final with the first leg being played at Brisbane Road in Leyton on 21 May 1989. Mark Cooper gave the home side the lead after six minutes with a header. He scored his and Leyton Orient's second in the 83rd minute from a free kick to give his side a 2–0 win. The return leg was held three days later at the McCain Stadium in Scarborough. The home side applied most of the pressure including shots from Paul Olsson and Chris Short, and a goalline clearance from Kevin Hales, but the first half ended goalless. Martin Russell scored in the 70th minute to give Scarborough the lead. Despite losing the match 1–0, Leyton Orient progressed to the final with a 2–1 aggregate win.

== Match ==
=== Background ===
Neither Wrexham nor Leyton Orient had participated in the English Football League play-offs prior to this season. Wrexham had played in the Fourth Division since being relegated from the Third in the 1982–83 season while Leyton Orient had played in the fourth tier since being relegated there (as Orient) in the 1984–85 season. Both sides had won their away game in the matches between them during the regular season: Wrexham secured a 1–0 victory at Brisbane Road in December 1988 while Leyton Orient won by the same scoreline at the Racecourse Ground the following April.

=== First leg ===
==== Summary ====
The first leg of the play-off final took place at the Racecourse Ground on 30 May 1989 in front a crowd of 7,915, Wrexham's largest attendance of the season. The referee for the match was Terry Holbrook. Ian Ross, writing in The Times, described the playing surface as "so dry as to make the bounce of the ball unpredictable". Although those conditions did not favour Leyton Orient whose "attempts to play cohesive football floundered", they had the first opportunity to score when a free kick from Kevin Dickenson struck the Wrexham crossbar from a Cooper header. Alan Comfort played in a number of crosses but none were converted by his Leyton Orient colleagues. Wrexham were limited to long-range chances, to no avail, and the match ended in a goalless draw.

==== Details ====
30 May 1989	Wrexham	0–0	Leyton Orient	Racecourse Ground, Wrexham
				Attendance: 7,915; Referee: Terry Holbrook

GK	1	Mike Salmon
RB	2	Neil Salathiel
CB	3	Darren Wright
CB	4	Geoff Hunter
LB	5	Nigel Beaumont
RM	6	Joey Jones
CM	7	Andy Thackeray (substituted off)
CM	8	Brian Flynn
LM	9	Ollie Kearns
CF	10	Kevin Russell
CF	11	Jon Bowden
Substitutes:
FW	12	Steve Buxton (substituted on)
Manager:
Dixie McNeil

GK	1	Paul Heald
RB	2	Terry Howard
CB	3	Kevin Dickenson
CB	4	Kevin Hales
LB	5	Keith Day
RM	6	John Sitton
CM	7	Steve Baker (substituted off)
CM	8	Steve Castle
FW	9	Lee Harvey
FW	10	Mark Cooper
LM	11	Alan Comfort
Substitutes:
FW	12	Paul Ward (substituted on)
Manager:
Frank Clark

=== Second leg ===
==== Summary ====
The second leg of the final was held at Brisbane Road on 3 June 1989 in front of a crowd of 13,355. The referee for the game was J. Martin and kick-off was delayed by 20 minutes as the large attendance was safely introduced to the ground. A minute before half-time, Leyton Orient took the lead when Lee Harvey struck the ball past Mike Salmon in the Wrexham goal from the right of the penalty area. One minute into the second half, Jon Bowden equalised for Wrexham when he was unmarked at the near post and headed in a cross. With eight minutes of the match remaining, Cooper received the ball from Harvey before swivelling and striking it past Salmon to make it 2–1. Leyton Orient won the match and tie, and were promoted to the Third Division.

==== Details ====
3 June 1989	Leyton Orient	2–1 (2–1 agg.)	Wrexham	Brisbane Road, Leyton
	Harvey 44'; Cooper 82'		Bowden 46'	Attendance: 13,355; Referee: J. Martin

GK	1	Paul Heald
RB	2	Terry Howard
CB	3	Kevin Dickenson (substituted off)
CB	4	Kevin Hales
LB	5	Keith Day
RM	6	John Sitton
CM	7	Steve Baker
CM	8	Steve Castle
FW	9	Lee Harvey
FW	10	Mark Cooper
LM	11	Alan Comfort
Substitutes:
FW	12	Paul Ward (substituted on)
Manager:
Frank Clark

GK	1	Mike Salmon
RB	2	Neil Salathiel
CB	3	Darren Wright
CB	4	Geoff Hunter
LB	5	Nigel Beaumont
RM	6	Joey Jones
CM	7	Andy Thackeray (substituted off)
CM	8	Brian Flynn (substituted off)
LM	9	Ollie Kearns
CF	10	Kevin Russell
CF	11	Jon Bowden
Substitutes:
FW	12	Steve Buxton (substituted on)
MF	13	Graham Cooper (substituted on)
Manager:
Dixie McNeil

== Post-match ==
Frank Clark, the winning manager, said "I do not feel sorry for [Wrexham] but I feel for them." He added that "Going back into the third won't make us a million ... But it's a start." His counterpart Dixie McNeil said "the lads fought hard all the way." He left Wrexham in November 1989 and was replaced by Brian Flynn. After the match, Comfort departed by helicopter for Heathrow Airport to catch a flight to Ireland where he was to be married later that afternoon.

Wrexham ended their following season in 21st place in the Fourth Division. Leyton Orient's next season saw them finish in fourteenth position in the Third Division.
