= PFA Team of the Year (1980s) =

Annual award

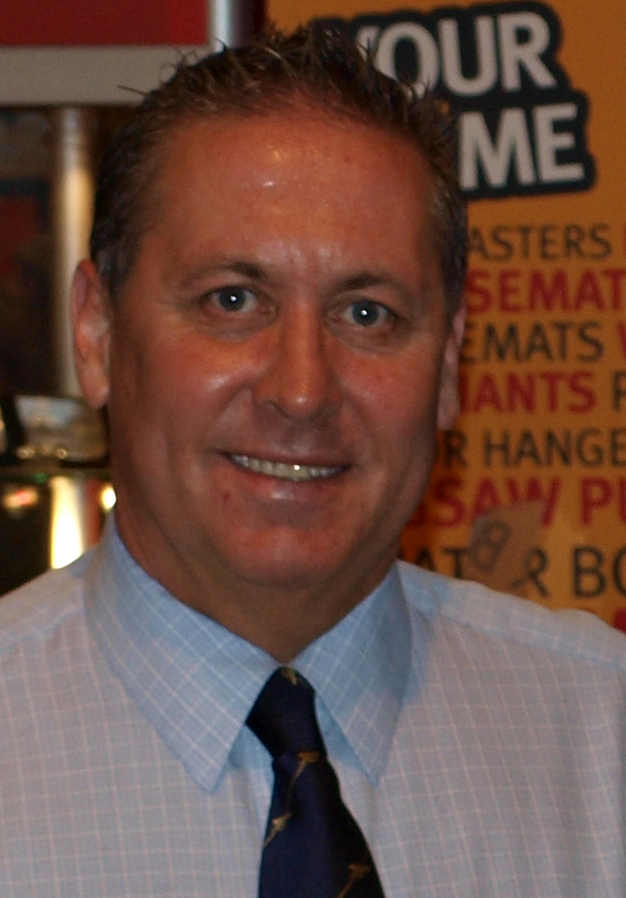
Kenny Sansom appeared in a PFA Team of the Year on 11 occasions, which is more than any other player.

The Professional Footballers' Association Team of the Year (often called the PFA Team of the Year, or simply the Team of the Year) is an annual award given to a set of 55 footballers across the top four tiers of men's English football; the Premier League, the Championship, League One and League Two, as well as the women's FA WSL, who are seen to be deserving of being named in a "Team of the Year". Peter Shilton currently holds the most appearances in the PFA Team of the Year in the top division with 10 appearances. Steven Gerrard currently holds the most appearances in the PFA Team of the Year in the Premier League era with eight appearances.

The award has been presented since the 1973–74 season and the shortlist is compiled by the members of the players' trade union, the Professional Footballers' Association (PFA), in January of every year, with the winners then being voted for by the other players in their respective divisions. The award is regarded by players in the Football League as the highest accolade available to them, due to it being picked by their fellow professionals. Oxford United's Damian Batt, who was named in the Team of the Year for League Two in 2011, said he was "very pleased to be given such a prestigious award. It is something that I am very proud of". In 2014, a team for female players competing in the FA WSL was selected for the first time.

== Key ==
- Heading key: Pos. – Position; App. – Number of appearances in a PFA Team of the Year.
- Position key: GK – Goalkeeper; DF – Defender; MF – Midfielder; FW – Forward.
- Players marked † appeared in a first tier PFA Team of the Year more than once.
- Players marked ‡ appeared in a second tier PFA Team of the Year more than once.
- Players marked * appeared in a third tier PFA Team of the Year more than once.
- Players marked ¤ appeared in a fourth tier PFA Team of the Year more than once.

== Winners ==
=== 1979–80 ===
==== First Division ====
Pos.	Player	Club	App.
GK	Peter Shilton †	Nottingham Forest	4
DF	Viv Anderson †	Nottingham Forest	2
DF	David Watson †	Southampton	4
DF	David O'Leary †	Arsenal	2
DF	Kenny Sansom †	Crystal Palace	4
MF	Terry McDermott	Liverpool	1
MF	Liam Brady †	Arsenal	3
MF	Glenn Hoddle	Tottenham Hotspur	2
FW	Kenny Dalglish †	Liverpool	2
FW	David Johnson	Liverpool	1
FW	Garry Birtles	Nottingham Forest	1

==== Second Division ====
Pos.	Player	Club	App.
GK	Phil Parkes	West Ham United	1
DF	Kirk Stephens	Luton Town	1
DF	Colin Todd	Birmingham City	4
DF	Billy Bonds	West Ham United	2
DF	Mark Dennis	Birmingham City	1
MF	Archie Gemmill	Birmingham City	1
MF	Trevor Brooking ‡	West Ham United	4
MF	Alan Devonshire	West Ham United	1
FW	Clive Allen	Queens Park Rangers	1
FW	Peter Withe ‡	Newcastle United	2
FW	David Moss	Luton Town	2

==== Third Division ====
Pos.	Player	Club	App.
GK	John Jackson	Millwall	1
DF	Gerry Forrest	Rotherham United	1
DF	Bill Green	Chesterfield	1
DF	Mark Smith	Sheffield Wednesday	1
DF	Kevin Moore	Grimsby Town	1
MF	Alejandro Sabella	Sheffield United	1
MF	Joe Waters	Grimsby Town	2
MF	Ray McHale	Swindon Town	1
FW	Andy Rowland	Swindon Town	1
FW	Alan Mayes	Swindon Town	2
FW	Terry Curran	Sheffield Wednesday	1

==== Fourth Division ====
Pos.	Player	Club	App.
GK	John Turner	Torquay United	1
DF	Malcolm Brown	Huddersfield Town	1
DF	Keith Oakes	Newport County	1
DF	Steve Baines	Bradford City	1
DF	Joe Hinnigan	Wigan Athletic	1
MF	Joe Laidlaw	Portsmouth	1
MF	Murray Brodie	Aldershot	1
MF	Terry Brisley	Portsmouth	1
FW	Alan Buckley	Walsall	5
FW	Don Penn	Walsall	1
FW	Ian Robins	Huddersfield Town	1

=== 1980–81 ===
==== First Division ====
Pos.	Player	Club	App.
GK	Peter Shilton †	Nottingham Forest	5
DF	Kenny Swain	Aston Villa	1
DF	Russell Osman	Ipswich Town	1
DF	Allan Evans	Aston Villa	1
DF	Kenny Sansom †	Arsenal	5
MF	Frans Thijssen	Ipswich Town	1
MF	John Wark	Ipswich Town	1
MF	Graeme Souness	Liverpool	1
FW	Paul Mariner	Ipswich Town	1
FW	Kenny Dalglish †	Liverpool	3
FW	Gary Shaw	Aston Villa	1

==== Second Division ====
Pos.	Player	Club	App.
GK	Phil Parkes ‡	West Ham United	2
DF	Ray Stewart	West Ham United	1
DF	Alvin Martin	West Ham United	1
DF	Billy Bonds ‡	West Ham United	3
DF	Ray O'Brien	Notts County	1
MF	Trevor Brooking ‡	West Ham United	5
MF	Tony Currie	Queens Park Rangers	3
MF	Alan Devonshire ‡	West Ham United	2
FW	Paul Goddard	West Ham United	1
FW	David Cross	West Ham United	1
FW	Terry Curran	Sheffield Wednesday	2

==== Third Division ====
Pos.	Player	Club	App.
GK	Nicky Johns	Charlton Athletic	1
DF	Malcolm Brown	Huddersfield Town	2
DF	Ian Evans *	Barnsley	3
DF	Mick McCarthy	Barnsley	3
DF	John Breckin *	Rotherham United	3
MF	Ronnie Glavin	Barnsley	1
MF	Alan Birch	Chesterfield	1
MF	Danny Wilson	Chesterfield	1
FW	Dave Kemp *	Plymouth Argyle	2
FW	Derek Hales	Charlton Athletic	1
FW	Tony Kellow	Exeter City	1

==== Fourth Division ====
Pos.	Player	Club	App.
GK	Mervyn Cawston	Southend United	1
DF	Ces Podd	Bradford City	1
DF	Trevor Peake	Lincoln City	1
DF	Dave Cusack	Southend United	1
DF	Steve Sherlock	Stockport County	1
MF	Billy Kellock	Peterborough United	1
MF	Alan Little ¤	Doncaster Rovers	2
MF	Anton Otulakowski	Southend United	1
FW	Robbie Cooke	Peterborough United	1
FW	Derek Spence	Southend United	1
FW	Steve Phillips	Northampton Town	1

=== 1981–82 ===
==== First Division ====
Pos.	Player	Club	App.
GK	Peter Shilton †	Nottingham Forest	6
DF	Kenny Swain †	Aston Villa	2
DF	David O'Leary †	Arsenal	3
DF	Alan Hansen	Liverpool	1
DF	Kenny Sansom †	Arsenal	6
MF	Graeme Souness †	Liverpool	2
MF	Glenn Hoddle †	Tottenham Hotspur	3
MF	Bryan Robson	Manchester United	1
FW	Trevor Francis †	Manchester City	3
FW	Kevin Keegan †	Southampton	3
FW	Cyrille Regis †	West Bromwich Albion	2

==== Second Division ====
Pos.	Player	Club	App.
GK	Mark Wallington ‡	Leicester City	2
DF	Kirk Stephens ‡	Luton Town	2
DF	Mick McCarthy	Barnsley	4
DF	Glenn Roeder	Queens Park Rangers	1
DF	Steve Buckley	Derby County	1
MF	Ricky Hill	Luton Town	1
MF	Ian Banks	Barnsley	1
MF	Brian Horton ‡	Luton Town	3
FW	David Moss ‡	Luton Town	3
FW	Simon Stainrod	Queens Park Rangers	1
FW	Paul Walsh	Charlton Athletic	1

==== Third Division ====
Pos.	Player	Club	App.
GK	Gerry Peyton	Fulham	1
DF	Malcolm Brown *	Huddersfield Town	3
DF	Tony Gale	Fulham	1
DF	Martin Dobson	Burnley	1
DF	Dave Rushbury	Carlisle United	1
MF	Phil Bonnyman	Chesterfield	1
MF	Danny Wilson *	Chesterfield	2
MF	Dick Tydeman	Gillingham	1
FW	Gordon Davies	Fulham	1
FW	Keith Cassells	Oxford United	1
FW	Tony Kellow *	Exeter City	2

==== Fourth Division ====
Pos.	Player	Club	App.
GK	Keith Waugh	Sheffield United	1
DF	Ces Podd ¤	Bradford City	2
DF	Paul Hilton	Bury	1
DF	Colin Methven	Wigan Athletic	1
DF	Steve Sherlock ¤	Stockport County	2
MF	Billy Kellock ¤	Peterborough United	2
MF	Roger Osborne	Colchester United	1
MF	Micky Gynn	Peterborough United	1
FW	Bobby Campbell	Bradford City	1
FW	Mark Chamberlain	Port Vale	1
FW	Craig Madden	Bury	1

=== 1982–83 ===
==== First Division ====
Pos.	Player	Club	App.
GK	Peter Shilton †	Southampton	7
DF	Danny Thomas	Coventry City	1
DF	Mark Lawrenson	Liverpool	2
DF	Alan Hansen †	Liverpool	2
DF	Kenny Sansom †	Arsenal	7
MF	Bryan Robson †	Manchester United	2
MF	Graeme Souness †	Liverpool	3
MF	Sammy Lee	Liverpool	1
FW	Ian Rush	Liverpool	1
FW	Kenny Dalglish †	Liverpool	4
FW	Steve Coppell †	Manchester United	2

==== Second Division ====
Pos.	Player	Club	App.
GK	John Burridge	Wolverhampton Wanderers	1
DF	John Humphrey	Wolverhampton Wanderers	1
DF	Mick McCarthy ‡	Barnsley	5
DF	Tony Gale	Fulham	1
DF	John Ryan	Oldham Athletic	1
MF	Kenny Hibbitt	Wolverhampton Wanderers	1
MF	Ray Houghton	Fulham	1
MF	Ronnie Glavin	Barnsley	1
FW	Kevin Keegan	Newcastle United	4
FW	Andy Gray	Wolverhampton Wanderers	2
FW	Gordon Davies	Fulham	2

==== Third Division ====
Pos.	Player	Club	App.
GK	David Felgate	Lincoln City	1
DF	Malcolm Brown *	Huddersfield Town	4
DF	Trevor Peake	Lincoln City	2
DF	Steve Bruce	Gillingham	1
DF	Micky Adams	Gillingham	1
MF	Neil Webb	Portsmouth	1
MF	David Williams	Bristol Rovers	1
MF	Bobby Doyle	Portsmouth	1
FW	Kerry Dixon	Reading	1
FW	Alan Biley	Portsmouth	1
FW	Glenn Cockerill	Lincoln City	1

==== Fourth Division ====
Pos.	Player	Club	App.
GK	Iain Hesford	Blackpool	1
DF	Chris Price	Hereford United	1
DF	Paul Hilton ¤	Bury	2
DF	Phil Sproson	Port Vale	1
DF	Russell Bromage	Port Vale	1
MF	Micky Gynn ¤	Peterborough United	2
MF	Gary Emmanuel	Swindon Town	1
MF	Geoff Hunter	Port Vale	1
FW	Les Mutrie	Hull City	1
FW	Paul Rideout	Swindon Town	1
FW	Steve Fox	Port Vale	1

=== 1983–84 ===
==== First Division ====
Pos.	Player	Club	App.
GK	Peter Shilton †	Southampton	8
DF	Mike Duxbury	Manchester United	1
DF	Mark Lawrenson †	Liverpool	3
DF	Alan Hansen †	Liverpool	3
DF	Kenny Sansom †	Arsenal	8
MF	Bryan Robson †	Manchester United	3
MF	Graeme Souness †	Liverpool	4
MF	Glenn Hoddle †	Tottenham Hotspur	4
FW	Ian Rush †	Liverpool	2
FW	Kenny Dalglish †	Liverpool	5
FW	Frank Stapleton	Manchester United	1

==== Second Division ====
Pos.	Player	Club	App.
GK	Alex Williams	Manchester City	1
DF	Mel Sterland	Sheffield Wednesday	1
DF	Mick McCarthy ‡	Manchester City	6
DF	Mick Lyons	Sheffield Wednesday	1
DF	Joey Jones	Chelsea	1
MF	Gary Megson	Sheffield Wednesday	1
MF	Jimmy Case	Brighton & Hove Albion	1
MF	Tony Grealish	Brighton & Hove Albion	1
FW	Kerry Dixon	Chelsea	2
FW	Kevin Keegan ‡	Newcastle United	5
FW	Mark Hateley	Portsmouth	1

==== Third Division ====
Pos.	Player	Club	App.
GK	David Felgate *	Lincoln City	2
DF	Gordon Nisbet	Plymouth Argyle	1
DF	Steve Bruce *	Gillingham	2
DF	Malcolm Shotton	Oxford United	1
DF	Bobby McDonald	Oxford United	1
MF	Trevor Hebberd	Oxford United	1
MF	Kevin Brock	Oxford United	1
MF	Brian Flynn	Burnley	1
FW	Keith Edwards	Sheffield United	1
FW	Billy Hamilton	Burnley	1
FW	Colin Morris	Sheffield United	1

==== Fourth Division ====
Pos.	Player	Club	App.
GK	Roger Jones	York City	3
DF	Chris Price ¤	Hereford United	2
DF	Colin Greenall	Blackpool	1
DF	John MacPhail	York City	1
DF	Steve Richardson	Reading	1
MF	Ian Snodin	Doncaster Rovers	1
MF	Jim Harvey	Hereford United	1
MF	Trevor Quow	Peterborough United	1
FW	Trevor Senior	Reading	1
FW	John Byrne	York City	1
FW	Keith Walwyn	York City	1

=== 1984–85 ===
==== First Division ====
Pos.	Player	Club	App.
GK	Peter Shilton †	Southampton	9
DF	Gary Stevens	Everton	1
DF	Mark Lawrenson †	Liverpool	4
DF	Kevin Ratcliffe	Everton	1
DF	Kenny Sansom †	Arsenal	9
MF	Bryan Robson †	Manchester United	4
MF	Peter Reid	Everton	2
MF	Kevin Sheedy	Everton	1
FW	Ian Rush †	Liverpool	3
FW	Chris Waddle	Newcastle United	1
FW	Kerry Dixon	Chelsea	3

==== Second Division ====
Pos.	Player	Club	App.
GK	Terry Gennoe	Blackburn Rovers	1
DF	Paul Parker	Fulham	1
DF	Mick McCarthy ‡	Manchester City	7
DF	Billy Gilbert	Portsmouth	1
DF	Bobby McDonald	Oxford United	2
MF	Neil Webb	Portsmouth	2
MF	Clive Wilson	Manchester City	1
MF	Danny Wilson	Brighton & Hove Albion	3
FW	John Aldridge	Oxford United	1
FW	Billy Hamilton	Oxford United	2
FW	Paul Wilkinson	Grimsby Town	1

==== Third Division ====
Pos.	Player	Club	App.
GK	Tony Norman	Hull City	1
DF	Gerry Forrest	Rotherham United	2
DF	Peter Skipper	Hull City	1
DF	Dave Cusack	Millwall	1
DF	Kenny Mower	Walsall	1
MF	Ian Snodin	Doncaster Rovers	2
MF	Stuart McCall	Bradford City	1
MF	David Williams *	Bristol Rovers	2
FW	Tony Cascarino	Gillingham	1
FW	Bobby Campbell	Bradford City	2
FW	Bobby Davison	Derby County	1

==== Fourth Division ====
Pos.	Player	Club	App.
GK	Fred Barber	Darlington	1
DF	Chris Price ¤	Hereford United	3
DF	Martin Dobson	Bury	1
DF	Steve Hetzke	Blackpool	1
DF	Russell Bromage	Port Vale	2
MF	Jim Harvey ¤	Hereford United	2
MF	Joe Jakub	Bury	1
MF	Trevor Quow ¤	Peterborough United	2
FW	Tony Adcock	Colchester United	1
FW	Stewart Phillips	Hereford United	1
FW	John Clayton	Tranmere Rovers	1

=== 1985–86 ===
==== First Division ====
Pos.	Player	Club	App.
GK	Peter Shilton †	Southampton	10
DF	Gary Stevens †	Everton	2
DF	Mark Lawrenson †	Liverpool	5
DF	Paul McGrath	Manchester United	1
DF	Kenny Sansom †	Arsenal	10
MF	Glenn Hoddle †	Tottenham Hotspur	5
MF	Bryan Robson †	Manchester United	5
MF	Stewart Robson	Arsenal	1
FW	Gary Lineker	Everton	1
FW	Mark Hughes	Manchester United	1
FW	Paul Walsh	Liverpool	2

==== Second Division ====
Pos.	Player	Club	App.
GK	Chris Woods	Norwich City	1
DF	Paul Parker ‡	Fulham	2
DF	Steve Bruce	Norwich City	3
DF	Dave Watson	Norwich City	1
DF	Mark Reid	Charlton Athletic	1
MF	Danny Wilson ‡	Brighton & Hove Albion	4
MF	Ian Snodin	Leeds United	3
MF	Mark Aizlewood	Charlton Athletic	1
FW	Kevin Drinkell	Norwich City	1
FW	Vince Hilaire	Portsmouth	1
FW	Keith Bertschin	Stoke City	1

==== Third Division ====
Pos.	Player	Club	App.
GK	Mark Wallington	Derby County	3
DF	Gordon Nisbet *	Plymouth Argyle	2
DF	Steve Buckley	Derby County	2
DF	Ross MacLaren	Derby County	1
DF	Terry Boyle	Newport County	1
MF	John Gregory	Derby County	1
MF	Terry Hurlock	Reading	1
MF	Bobby Hutchinson	Bristol City	1
FW	Bobby Davison	Derby County	2
FW	Trevor Senior	Reading	2
FW	Tony Cascarino *	Gillingham	2

==== Fourth Division ====
Pos.	Player	Club	App.
GK	Mike Salmon	Stockport County	1
DF	Chris Price ¤	Hereford United	4
DF	George Foster	Mansfield Town	1
DF	Phil Sproson ¤	Port Vale	2
DF	Martin Pike	Peterborough United	1
MF	Jim Harvey ¤	Hereford United	3
MF	Kevin Hird	Burnley	2
MF	Trevor Quow ¤	Peterborough United	3
FW	Stuart Rimmer	Chester City	1
FW	Frank Worthington	Tranmere Rovers	1
FW	Richard Cadette	Southend United	1

=== 1986–87 ===
==== First Division ====
Pos.	Player	Club	App.
GK	Neville Southall	Everton	1
DF	Viv Anderson †	Arsenal	3
DF	Alan Hansen †	Liverpool	4
DF	Tony Adams	Arsenal	1
DF	Kenny Sansom †	Arsenal	11
MF	Glenn Hoddle †	Tottenham Hotspur	6
MF	Kevin Sheedy †	Everton	2
MF	David Rocastle	Arsenal	1
FW	Ian Rush †	Liverpool	4
FW	Clive Allen	Tottenham Hotspur	2
FW	Peter Beardsley	Newcastle United	1

==== Second Division ====
Pos.	Player	Club	App.
GK	Andy Goram	Oldham Athletic	1
DF	Lee Dixon	Stoke City	1
DF	Larry May	Barnsley	1
DF	Noel Blake	Portsmouth	1
DF	Julian Dicks	Birmingham City	1
MF	John Sheridan	Leeds United	1
MF	John Gregory	Derby County	2
MF	Stuart McCall	Bradford City	2
FW	Bobby Davison	Derby County	3
FW	Micky Quinn	Portsmouth	1
FW	John Hendrie	Bradford City	1

==== Third Division ====
Pos.	Player	Club	App.
GK	Gerry Peyton	Bournemouth	1
DF	Paul Parker	Fulham	3
DF	Colin Greenall	Gillingham	1
DF	Gary Pallister	Middlesbrough	1
DF	Kenny Mower *	Walsall	2
MF	Brian Laws	Middlesbrough	1
MF	Asa Hartford	Bolton Wanderers	2
MF	Bobby Hutchinson *	Walsall	2
FW	David Kelly	Walsall	1
FW	Ian McParland	Notts County	1
FW	Tony Cascarino *	Gillingham	2

==== Fourth Division ====
Pos.	Player	Club	App.
GK	Jim Stannard	Southend United	1
DF	Alan Paris	Peterborough United	1
DF	Keith McPherson	Northampton Town	1
DF	Sam Allardyce	Preston North End	1
DF	Terry Phelan	Swansea City	1
MF	Richard Hill	Northampton Town	1
MF	Jim Harvey ¤	Hereford United	4
MF	Tommy Hutchison	Swansea City	1
FW	Richard Cadette ¤	Southend United	2
FW	Trevor Morley	Northampton Town	1
FW	Colin Pascoe	Swansea City	1

=== 1987–88 ===
==== First Division ====
Pos.	Player	Club	App.
GK	Neville Southall †	Everton	2
DF	Gary Stevens †	Everton	3
DF	Alan Hansen †	Liverpool	5
DF	Gary Gillespie	Liverpool	1
DF	Stuart Pearce	Nottingham Forest	1
MF	Steve McMahon	Liverpool	1
MF	Peter Reid †	Everton	3
MF	Paul Gascoigne	Newcastle United	1
MF	John Barnes	Liverpool	1
FW	Peter Beardsley †	Liverpool	2
FW	Graeme Sharp	Everton	1

==== Second Division ====
Pos.	Player	Club	App.
GK	Nigel Spink	Aston Villa	1
DF	Chris Price	Blackburn Rovers	5
DF	Gary Pallister	Middlesbrough	2
DF	Tony Mowbray	Middlesbrough	1
DF	Andy Hinchcliffe	Manchester City	1
MF	Stuart McCall ‡	Bradford City	3
MF	Andy Gray	Aston Villa	1
MF	John Sheridan ‡	Leeds United	2
FW	Paul Stewart	Manchester City	1
FW	Mark Bright	Crystal Palace	1
FW	John Hendrie ‡	Bradford City	2

==== Third Division ====
Pos.	Player	Club	App.
GK	Kevin Hitchcock	Mansfield Town	1
DF	Roger Joseph	Brentford	1
DF	Gary Bennett	Sunderland	1
DF	Dean Yates	Notts County	1
DF	Keith Dublin	Brighton & Hove Albion	1
MF	Ray Walker	Port Vale	1
MF	Geoff Pike	Notts County	1
MF	Andy Williams	Rotherham United	1
FW	Garry Nelson	Brighton & Hove Albion	1
FW	Leroy Rosenior	Fulham	1
FW	Ian McParland *	Notts County	2

==== Fourth Division ====
Pos.	Player	Club	App.
GK	Mark Kendall	Wolverhampton Wanderers	1
DF	Phil Brown	Halifax Town	1
DF	Terry Boyle	Cardiff City	2
DF	Keith Day	Leyton Orient	1
DF	Kevin Dickenson	Leyton Orient	1
MF	Mick Gooding	Peterborough United	1
MF	Alan Davies	Swansea City	1
MF	Paul Wimbleton	Cardiff City	1
FW	Steve Bull	Wolverhampton Wanderers	1
FW	David Currie	Darlington	1
FW	Andy Mutch	Wolverhampton Wanderers	1

=== 1988–89 ===
==== First Division ====
Pos.	Player	Club	App.
GK	Neville Southall †	Everton	3
DF	Steve Nicol	Liverpool	1
DF	Des Walker	Nottingham Forest	1
DF	Paul Parker	Queens Park Rangers	4
DF	Stuart Pearce †	Nottingham Forest	2
MF	David Rocastle †	Arsenal	2
MF	Bryan Robson †	Manchester United	6
MF	Andy Townsend	Norwich City	1
MF	Chris Waddle †	Tottenham Hotspur	2
FW	Mark Hughes †	Manchester United	2
FW	Alan Smith	Arsenal	1

==== Second Division ====
Pos.	Player	Club	App.
GK	Tony Coton	Watford	1
DF	David Bardsley	Oxford United	1
DF	Graham Roberts	Chelsea	1
DF	Colin Hendry	Blackburn Rovers	1
DF	Tony Dorigo	Chelsea	1
MF	Neil McNab	Manchester City	1
MF	Gary McAllister	Leicester City	1
MF	John Sheridan ‡	Leeds United	3
FW	Gordon Durie	Chelsea	1
FW	Ian Wright	Crystal Palace	1
FW	David Currie	Barnsley	2

==== Third Division ====
Pos.	Player	Club	App.
GK	Nigel Martyn	Bristol Rovers	1
DF	Phil Brown	Bolton Wanderers	2
DF	Dean Yates	Notts County	1
DF	Rob Newman	Bristol City	1
DF	Chris Coleman	Swansea City	1
MF	Ray Walker	Port Vale	2
MF	Brian Mooney	Preston North End	1
MF	Sammy McIlroy	Bury	1
FW	Steve Bull	Wolverhampton Wanderers	2
FW	Andy Mutch	Wolverhampton Wanderers	2
FW	Tony Agana	Sheffield United	1

==== Fourth Division ====
Pos.	Player	Club	App.
GK	Eric Nixon	Tranmere Rovers	1
DF	Billy Russell	Rotherham United	1
DF	Shaun Taylor	Exeter City	1
DF	Neil Thompson	Exeter City	1
DF	Joey Jones	Wrexham	2
MF	Jim Harvey ¤	Tranmere Rovers	5
MF	Tony Grealish	Rotherham United	2
MF	Paul Ward	Leyton Orient	1
FW	Phil Stant	Hereford United	1
FW	Ian Muir	Tranmere Rovers	1
FW	Kevin Russell	Wrexham	1

== See also ==
- PFA Team of the Year (1970s)
- PFA Team of the Year (1990s)
- PFA Team of the Year (2000s)
- PFA Team of the Year (2010s)
- PFA Team of the Year (2020s)
