= 1981–82 Luton Town F.C. season =

English football club season

Luton Town
1981–82 season
- Chairman: David Evans
- Manager: David Pleat
- Stadium: Kenilworth Road
- Division Two: 1st
- Milk Cup: Second round
- FA Cup: Fourth round
- Top goalscorer: League: Brian Stein (21); All: Brian Stein (21)
- Highest home attendance: 20,188 v Ipswich Town, FA Cup, 23 January 1982
- Lowest home attendance: 6,146 v Wrexham, Milk Cup, 6 October 1981
- Average home league attendance: 11,880
- Biggest win: 6–0 v Grimsby Town (H), Division Two, 17 October 1981
- Biggest defeat: 0–3 v Sheffield Wednesday (H), Division Two, 12 September 1981; 0–3 v Ipswich Town (H), FA Cup, 23 January 1982

The 1981–82 season was the 96th in the history of Luton Town Football Club. They finished as champions of the Second Division to earn a place in the top flight of English football for the first time since relegation in 1975.

== Squad ==
Players who made one appearance or more for Luton Town F.C. during the 1981-82 season

Pos.	Nat.	Name	League		Milk Cup		FA Cup		Total	
Pos.	Nat.	Name	Apps	Goals	Apps	Goals	Apps	Goals	Apps	Goals
GK	ENG	Milija Aleksic (on loan from Tottenham Hotspur)	4	0	0	0	0	0	4	0
GK	SCO	Jake Findlay	34	0	2	0	2	0	38	0
GK	ENG	Alan Judge	4	0	0	0	0	0	4	0
DF	WAL	Mark Aizlewood	26	3	0	0	2	0	28	3
DF	NIR	Mal Donaghy	42	9	2	0	2	0	46	9
DF	ENG	Clive Goodyear	32	1	1	0	2	0	35	1
DF	ENG	Richard Money	13	1	0	0	0	0	13	1
DF	ENG	Mike Saxby	12	1	2	0	0	0	14	1
DF	ENG	Kirk Stephens	42	0	2	0	2	0	46	0
MF	YUG	Raddy Antić	17(13)	5	1	0	0(1)	0	18(14)	5
MF	ENG	Lil Fuccillo	27(2)	2	2	0	2	0	31(2)	2
MF	ENG	Ricky Hill	38	5	2	0	2	0	42	5
MF	ENG	Brian Horton	41	1	2	0	2	1	45	2
MF	ENG	David Moss	36	15	2	0	2	1	40	16
MF	ENG	Wayne Turner	7	1	0	0	0	0	7	1
FW	ENG	Frankie Bunn	0(2)	0	0	0	0	0	0(2)	0
FW	ENG	Godfrey Ingram	3	0	0(1)	0	0	0	3(1)	0
FW	ENG	Billy Jennings	0(2)	1	0	0	0	0	0(2)	1
FW	ENG	Mike Small	0(3)	0	0	0	0	0	0(3)	0
FW	ENG	Brian Stein	42	21	2	0	2	0	46	21
FW	ENG	Steve White	42	18	2	1	2	0	46	19

== League table ==
Pos	Team	Pld	W	D	L	GF	GA	GD	Pts	Qualification or relegation
1	Luton Town (C, P)	42	25	13	4	86	46	+40	88	Promotion to the First Division
2	Watford (P)	42	23	11	8	76	42	+34	80	Promotion to the First Division
3	Norwich City (P)	42	22	5	15	64	50	+14	71	Promotion to the First Division
4	Sheffield Wednesday	42	20	10	12	55	51	+4	70	
5	Queens Park Rangers	42	21	6	15	65	43	+22	69	

Rules for classification: 1) Points; 2) Goal difference; 3) Goals scored
(C) Champions; (P) Promoted

== Results ==
=== Second Division ===
29 August 1981 1	Luton Town	3–0	Charlton Athletic	Luton
	Donaghy 22'; McAllister 31' (o.g.); White 59'			Stadium: Kenilworth Road; Attendance: 8,776

1 September 1981 2	Queens Park Rangers	1–2	Luton Town	London
	King 34'		Aizlewood 70'; Hill 84'	Stadium: Loftus Road; Attendance: 18,703

5 September 1981 3	Bolton Wanderers	1–2	Luton Town	Bolton
	Gowling 64'		Stein 70'; Aizlewood 79'	Stadium: Burnden Park; Attendance: 6,911

12 September 1981 4	Luton Town	0–3	Sheffield Wednesday	Luton
			McCulloch 60'; Megson 73'; Bannister 83'	Stadium: Kenilworth Road; Attendance: 12,131

19 September 1981 5	Leicester City	1–2	Luton Town	Leicester
	Lynex 39' (pen.)		White 46', 52'	Stadium: Filbert Street; Attendance: 14,159

22 September 1981 6	Luton Town	2–3	Cardiff City	Luton
	Saxby 44'; Antić 71'		Kitchen 8' (pen.); Sayer 31'; Stevens 63'	Stadium: Kenilworth Road; Attendance: 9,015

26 September 1981 7	Luton Town	4–1	Watford	Luton
	Moss 33' (pen.), 37' (pen.); Stein 43', 52'		Bolton 66'	Stadium: Kenilworth Road; Attendance: 12,839

3 October 1981 8	Orient	0–3	Luton Town	London
			Aizlewood 20'; Hill 25'; White 74'	Stadium: Brisbane Road; Attendance: 4,944

10 October 1981 9	Oldham Athletic	1–1	Luton Town	Oldham
	Wylde 37'		White 84'	Stadium: Boundary Park; Attendance: 8,403

17 October 1981 10	Luton Town	6–0	Grimsby Town	Luton
	Fuccillo 13'; Moss 22' (pen.); White 34', 55', 60', 70'			Stadium: Kenilworth Road; Attendance: 9,090

24 October 1981 11	Wrexham	0–2	Luton Town	Wrexham
			Donaghy 28'; White 44'	Stadium: Racecourse Ground; Attendance: 4,059

31 October 1981 12	Luton Town	1–0	Crystal Palace	Luton
	Moss 29' (pen.)			Stadium: Kenilworth Road; Attendance: 11,712

7 November 1981 13	Luton Town	3–2	Derby County	Luton
	Moss 37'; Goodyear 65'; Donaghy 76'		Osgood 75'; Clayton 88'	Stadium: Kenilworth Road; Attendance: 10,784

14 November 1981 14	Blackburn Rovers	0–1	Luton Town	Blackburn
			Moss 79' (pen.)	Stadium: Ewood Park; Attendance: 9,862

21 November 1981 15	Newcastle United	3–2	Luton Town	Newcastle upon Tyne
	Brown 1', 37'; Varadi 90'		Moss 83' (pen.); Donaghy 89'	Stadium: St James' Park; Attendance: 21,084

24 November 1981 16	Luton Town	2–0	Bolton Wanderers	Luton
	Stein 67'; Moss 80'			Stadium: Kenilworth Road; Attendance: 8,889

28 November 1981 17	Luton Town	3–1	Rotherham United	Luton
	White 49'; Donaghy 63'; Stein 64'		Fern 57'	Stadium: Kenilworth Road; Attendance: 11,061

5 December 1981 18	Shrewsbury Town	2–2	Luton Town	Shrewsbury
	Dungworth 5'; Atkins 32'		White 15'; Donaghy 76'	Stadium: Gay Meadow; Attendance: 5,259

28 December 1981 19	Norwich City	1–3	Luton Town	Norwich
	Deehan 43'		Antić 3'; White 10'; Stein 14'	Stadium: Carrow Road; Attendance: 18,458

19 January 1982 20	Charlton Athletic	0–0	Luton Town	London
				Stadium: The Valley; Attendance: 7,013

30 January 1982 21	Luton Town	2–1	Leicester City	Luton
	White 13'; Donaghy 67'		Lineker 52'	Stadium: Kenilworth Road; Attendance: 11,810

6 February 1982 22	Sheffield Wednesday	3–3	Luton Town	Sheffield
	Pearson 25', 75'; Bannister 82'		White 11'; Moss 49' (pen.); Stein 90'	Stadium: Hillsborough; Attendance: 18,252

20 February 1982 23	Watford	1–1	Luton Town	Watford
	Rostron 8'		Stein 33'	Stadium: Vicarage Road; Attendance: 22,798

27 February 1982 24	Luton Town	2–0	Oldham Athletic	Luton
	Moss 8' (pen.), 55'			Stadium: Kenilworth Road; Attendance: 11,506

2 March 1982 25	Luton Town	1–0	Cambridge United	Luton
	Horton 76'			Stadium: Kenilworth Road; Attendance: 10,597

6 March 1982 26	Grimsby Town	0–0	Luton Town	Cleethorpes
				Stadium: Blundell Park; Attendance: 7,734

12 March 1982 27	Luton Town	0–0	Wrexham	Luton
				Stadium: Kenilworth Road; Attendance: 10,880

16 March 1982 28	Barnsley	4–3	Luton Town	Barnsley
	Walker 44', 53'; Banks 67'; Evans 75'		Stein 10', 55'; Law 80' (o.g.)	Stadium: Oakwell; Attendance: 14,044

20 March 1982 29	Crystal Palace	3–3	Luton Town	London
	Smillie 8', 76'; Mabbutt 13'		Antić 12'; Moss 14' (pen.); Stein 38'	Stadium: Selhurst Park; Attendance: 12,187

27 March 1982 30	Derby County	0–0	Luton Town	Derby
				Stadium: Baseball Ground; Attendance: 15,836

30 March 1982 31	Luton Town	2–0	Orient	Luton
	Moss 62' (pen.); Hill 71'			Stadium: Kenilworth Road; Attendance: 9,716

3 April 1982 32	Luton Town	2–0	Blackburn Rovers	Luton
	Stein 27'; White 70'			Stadium: Kenilworth Road; Attendance: 10,721

10 April 1982 33	Cambridge United	1–1	Luton Town	Cambridge
	Reilly 62'		Turner 60'	Stadium: Abbey Stadium; Attendance: 8,815

12 April 1982 34	Luton Town	2–0	Norwich City	Luton
	Stein 54'; Jennings 57'			Stadium: Kenilworth Road; Attendance: 15,061

17 April 1982 35	Luton Town	3–2	Newcastle United	Luton
	Stein 63', 81' (pen.), 85' (pen.)		Mills 23'; Trewick 57' (pen.)	Stadium: Kenilworth Road; Attendance: 13,041

20 April 1982 36	Luton Town	2–2	Chelsea	Luton
	Antić 44'; Donaghy 76'		Walker 34'; Fillery 61'	Stadium: Kenilworth Road; Attendance: 16,185

24 April 1982 37	Rotherham United	2–2	Luton Town	Rotherham
	Moore 28'; Seasman 64'		Fuccillo 12'; Money 65'	Stadium: Millmoor; Attendance: 11,290

30 April 1982 38	Luton Town	4–1	Shrewsbury Town	Luton
	Stein 14'; Hill 78'; White 80'; Moss 88'		Atkins 60'	Stadium: Kenilworth Road; Attendance: 14,563

8 May 1982 39	Chelsea	1–2	Luton Town	London
	Walker 45'		Antić 25'; Stein 54'	Stadium: Stamford Bridge; Attendance: 15,044

11 May 1982 40	Luton Town	3–2	Queens Park Rangers	Luton
	Hill 36'; White 48'; Moss 80' (pen.)		Fenwick 69'; Stainrod 85'	Stadium: Kenilworth Road; Attendance: 16.657

15 May 1982 41	Luton Town	1–1	Barnsley	Luton
	Stein 87'		Birch 50' (pen.)	Stadium: Kenilworth Road; Attendance: 14,463

17 May 1982 42	Cardiff City	2–3	Luton Town	Cardiff
	Kitchen 83'; Micallef 87'		Stein 22', 81'; Donaghy 72'	Stadium: Ninian Park; Attendance: 10,277

=== Milk Cup ===
6 October 1981 Second round first leg	Luton Town	0–2	Wrexham	Luton
			Vinter 2'; Hunt 23'	Stadium: Kenilworth Road; Attendance: 6,146

27 October 1981 Second round first leg	Wrexham	0–1	Luton Town	Wrexham
			White 89'	Stadium: Racecourse Ground; Attendance: 3,453

=== FA Cup ===
2 January 1982 Third round	Luton Town	2–1	Swindon Town	Luton
	Moss 19' (pen.); Horton 88'		Emmanuel 75'	Stadium: Kenilworth Road; Attendance: 9,488

23 January 1982 Fourth round	Luton Town	0–3	Ipswich Town	Luton
			Brazil 62'; Gates 71', 87'	Stadium: Kenilworth Road; Attendance: 20,188
