= Paul Ward (footballer) =

English footballer & manager (born 1963)

Personal information
- Full name: Paul Terence Ward
- Date of birth: 15 September 1963 (age 63)
- Place of birth: Fishburn, England
- Height: 5 ft 11 in (1.80 m)
- Position: Midfielder

Youth career
- 19??–1981: Chelsea

Senior career*
Years	Team	Apps	(Gls)
1981–1982	Chelsea	0	(0)
1982–1985	Middlesbrough	76	(1)
1985–1988	Darlington	124	(9)
1988–1989	Leyton Orient	31	(1)
1989–1991	Scunthorpe United	55	(6)
1991–1993	Lincoln City	39	(0)
- Gainsborough Trinity

Managerial career
- 1987: Darlington
- Hatfield Main
- 1999: Harrogate Town
- 2002–2003: Hatfield Main
- Armthorpe Welfare
- 2014–2015: Retford United
- * Club domestic league appearances and goals

Paul Terence Ward (born 15 September 1963) is an English former professional footballer who played as a midfielder. He made more than 300 appearances in the Football League.

== Career ==
Ward began his career with Chelsea, and played in the Football League for Middlesbrough, Darlington, Leyton Orient, Scunthorpe United, and Lincoln City, before playing non-league football for Gainsborough Trinity.

His first experience as a manager was when he was asked to take over Darlington for the last 13 matches of their Division 3 relegation season. He was the youngest ever manager of a Football League club but reverted to playing duties after the end of the season.

In August 2002 he commenced a second spell as manager of Hatfield Main. He steered the club to the verge of promotion to the Premier Division of the Northern Counties East Football League before a late loss of form saw them finish in fifth place and then resign from the league due to financial problems. Ward departed to become joint manager, with Des Bennett, of Armthorpe Welfare.

In August 2013 he was appointed first-team coach at Retford United, rising to the role of manager in June 2014. However, following a run of ten league games which saw the club pick up only seven out of a possible thirty points and culminated in a 6–1 defeat at Garforth Town on 17 January 2015, he parted company with the club. On 5 May 2015 he joined Staveley Miners Welfare as assistant to the newly appointed manager Brett Marshall. He remained in post for six-and-a-half years until, in November 2021, Marshall and his assistants, Ward and Ian Bowling, resigned.

== Career outside of football ==
Ward owns and runs a health and fitness club in Doncaster, which he opened following his retirement from professional football in 1994.

== Honours ==
Leyton Orient

- Football League Fourth Division play-offs: 1989

Individual

- PFA Team of the Year: 1988–89 Fourth Division
