= Kevin Dickenson =

English footballer (born 1962)

Personal information
- Full name: Kevin James Dickenson
- Date of birth: 24 November 1962 (age 63)
- Place of birth: Hackney, England
- Height: 5 ft 6 in (1.68 m)
- Position: Left back

Youth career
- Tottenham Hotspur

Senior career*
| Years | Team | Apps | (Gls) |
| 1979–1985 | Charlton Athletic | 75 | (1) |
| 1985–1992 | Leyton Orient | 192 | (2) |
| Total | | 267 | (4) |
- * Club domestic league appearances and goals

Kevin James Dickenson (born 24 November 1962) is an English former professional footballer who played as a left back, making over 250 career appearances.

== Career ==
Born in Hackney, Dickenson played for Tottenham Hotspur, Charlton Athletic and Leyton Orient.

== Honours ==
Leyton Orient

- Football League Fourth Division play-offs: 1989

Individual

- PFA Team of the Year: 1987–88 Fourth Division
