= Terry Howard =

English footballer

Personal information
- Full name: Terence Howard
- Date of birth: 26 February 1966 (age 60)
- Place of birth: Stepney, England
- Height: 6 ft 1 in (1.85 m)
- Position: Defender

Youth career
- Chelsea

Senior career*
Years	Team	Apps	(Gls)
1984–1986	Chelsea	6	(0)
1985	→ Crystal Palace (loan)	4	(0)
1986	→ Chester City (loan)	2	(0)
1986–1995	Leyton Orient	328	(31)
1995–1996	Wycombe Wanderers	59	(2)
1996	Woking	?	(?)
1998–1999	Aldershot Town	45	(0)
Total		444	(33)

International career
1985	England U20	3	(0)
- * Club domestic league appearances and goals

Terence Howard (born 26 February 1966) is an English former footballer who played for Chelsea, Crystal Palace, Chester City, Leyton Orient, Wycombe Wanderers, Woking and Aldershot Town.

A tall full-back, Terry Howard played for Essex Schoolboys. He signed for Chelsea as an apprentice in Feb 1983. He was a regular member of the Chelsea Football Combination Championship side in 1984–85. He made his first team debut for Chelsea in April 1985 against Aston Villa.

After loan periods with Crystal Palace and Chester City, he moved to Leyton Orient in 1986.

On 7 February 1995, Howard, in his 397th appearance for Leyton Orient, was sacked at half-time by manager John Sitton, as featured in the Channel 4 documentary Orient: Club for a Fiver.

== Honours ==
Leyton Orient

- Football League Fourth Division play-offs: 1989

Woking

- FA Trophy: 1996–97
