= Kevin Hales =

English football player and manager (born 1961)

Personal information
- Full name: Kevin Peter Hales
- Date of birth: 13 January 1961 (age 65)
- Place of birth: Dartford, England
- Height: 5 ft 7 in (1.70 m)
- Position: Midfielder

Team information
- Current team: Rushden & Diamonds (coach)

Youth career
- Chelsea

Senior career*
Years	Team	Apps	(Gls)
1979–1983	Chelsea	20	(2)
1983–1993	Leyton Orient	353	(25)

Managerial career
- 1995–2000: Welling United
- 2000–2003: Stevenage Borough (assistant)
- 2003–2004: Margate (assistant)
- 2004: Erith & Belvedere
- 2004–2005: Hornchurch (assistant)
- 2005–2007: Weymouth (coach)
- 2007–2008: Rushden & Diamonds (coach)
- * Club domestic league appearances and goals

Kevin Peter Hales (born 13 January 1961) is a football coach and former player. Before coaching, he played as a midfielder for Chelsea and Leyton Orient, managed Welling United and Erith & Belvedere, was assistant manager at Hornchurch and coached at Weymouth and Rushden & Diamonds.

== Honours ==
Leyton Orient

- Football League Fourth Division play-offs: 1989
