= Paul Parker (footballer) =

English footballer, manager, and sports television pundit

Personal information
- Full name: Paul Andrew Parker
- Date of birth: 4 April 1964 (age 62)
- Place of birth: West Ham, Essex, England
- Height: 5 ft 7 in (1.70 m)
- Positions: Right back; centre back

Senior career*
Years	Team	Apps	(Gls)
1982–1987	Fulham	153	(2)
1987–1991	Queens Park Rangers	125	(1)
1991–1996	Manchester United	105	(1)
1996	Derby County	4	(0)
1996	Sheffield United	10	(0)
1997	Fulham	3	(0)
1997	Chelsea	4	(0)
1997	Heybridge Swifts	0	(0)
1997	Farnborough Town		
Total		404	(4)

International career
1981–1982	England Youth	3	(0)
1984–1986	England U21	8	(1)
1987–1989	England B	3	(0)
1989–1994	England	19	(0)

Managerial career
- 2001–2003: Chelmsford City
- 2003–2005: Welling United
- 2005–2006: Folkestone Invicta (assistant)
- * Club domestic league appearances and goals

Paul Andrew Parker (born 4 April 1964) is an English sports television pundit and former professional football player and manager.

As a player, he was a full back, most successfully with Manchester United with whom he won two Premier League titles, an FA Cup, a League Cup and the Charity Shield. Earlier he had established himself as a top flight centre-back and England international at Queens Park Rangers where he spent four years after starting his career with five years at Fulham. He had short spells with Chelsea, Derby County and Sheffield United and played non-league football with Heybridge Swifts and Farnborough Town before retiring in 1997. Internationally, Parker earned 19 caps for England and played at the 1990 World Cup.

He had spells as a manager from 2001 to 2005 with Chelmsford City and Welling United, later taking up a role as assistant manager at Folkestone Invicta before becoming a television pundit with ESPN and Sky Sports.

== Early life ==
He attended Sanders Draper School in Hornchurch.

== Club career ==
Parker started his career with Fulham before joining QPR, where he made his name as a nippy and incisive centre back, even though he lacked the height normally associated with his position. During this period, Parker was sold by QPR to Manchester United for £2 million on 8 August 1991, and he made his debut (now as a specialist right back) against Notts County the same month. Parker's five-year career at Old Trafford began well enough but was eventually blighted frequently by injury and as the club began to dominate the English game under Alex Ferguson, Parker struggled to maintain his fitness.

He won a League Cup winners medal in 1992, a Premiership title medal a year later, and another Premiership title medal and the FA Cup a further year on. The last two years though saw Parker's inability to stay fit coupled with the emergence of Gary Neville, who ultimately replaced Parker at right back for both club and country.

Parker missed most of the 1994–95 season through injury, and despite regaining his fitness for the 1995–96, he could not displace Neville and was freed at the end of the campaign. Although United won a second double, he did not play in enough Premier League games for a title medal, and did not feature in the FA Cup Final squad.

Parker then signed for Derby County, who had just been promoted to the Premier League, but could not win a regular first team place and signed for Sheffield United in November 1996. A brief spell back at Fulham, in their Division Three promotion campaign, followed. Later in the 1996–97 season, he played in four games for Chelsea (one start and three substitute appearances) during an injury crisis at Stamford Bridge, although he did not feature in the FA Cup Final triumph that ended Chelsea's 26-year trophy drought. After ending his professional career he entered the non-League scene with a move to Garry Hill's Heybridge Swifts. Parker previously played under Hill at Chelmsford Sunday League club Priory Sports, alongside Alan Brazil and Micky Droy.

== International career ==
His prowess was noticed by England coach Bobby Robson who, establishing he could also play at right back, gave him his international debut against Albania in 1989.

He had already appeared three times for the England B side, but was racially abused by England's own fans in a 2–0 win over the Iceland B side in Iceland on 19 May 1989.

Parker continued to play centrally for his club while deputising for the first-choice Gary Stevens on the right side of defence for country. He was selected as Stevens' back-up for the 1990 World Cup in Italy but, with Stevens putting in a disappointing display in the opening 1–1 draw with the Republic of Ireland, Parker was put in the team, just five caps into his career.

He stayed there, playing comfortably behind Chris Waddle as England progressed through their group and as far as the semi-finals, where they met West Germany. In the warm-up before the semi-final, Parker said in a 2022 interview with EnglandFootball.org that he "felt numb" because he was "too nervous to feel nervous." During the match, two incidents would define Parker's career.

With the score at 0–0, the Germans won a free kick just outside the England penalty area early in the second half and as the ball was tapped to Andreas Brehme, Parker sprinted from the defensive wall to try to block the shot. Instead, it clipped off him at such an angle that the ball looped high into the air and swirled round and over goalkeeper Peter Shilton and into the net. The goal was credited to Brehme, but Parker managed to make amends with fewer than ten minutes to play.

Collecting the ball down the right flank, he looked up and sent a high and dangerous ball towards Gary Lineker. The German defenders got in each other's way and Lineker found room to score with a far post shot. The game ended 1–1 and England departed on penalties. Stevens was recalled at right-back for the third-place play off match against Italy and Parker moved into central defence, unfortunately conceding the penalty from which Salvatore Schillaci scored the winning goal. However, Parker emerged from the tournament as one of England's many successes.

However, it did not help him curry favour with Robson's replacement as England coach, Graham Taylor, who chose Arsenal's Lee Dixon several times over the next few months, including all bar one of the qualifiers for Euro 1992. Parker, Dixon, Stevens and Rob Jones were all injured for the tournament itself in Sweden, so Taylor had to pick a central defender to play at right back and England were dismissed at the group stage.

Parker missed out on almost 18 months of international football but in October 1993 he was called up by Taylor for a vital qualifier for the 1994 World Cup against the Netherlands in Rotterdam. England lost 2–0 and Parker's hope of reaching a second World Cup were gone.

When Terry Venables took over as England coach in 1994, he called up Parker for his first game in charge – a 1–0 win over Denmark at Wembley but then looked at other right backs, including Jones, before installing Gary Neville as his first choice the following year. Parker's England career, which had reached such a high four years earlier, was over after just 19 appearances.

== Managerial and coaching career ==
After retiring from playing, Parker became director of football at Ashford Town, before departing, alongside manager George Wakeling, in January 2000. Later that year, Parker joined Chelmsford City's coaching staff. Following Gary Bellamy's departure to Dover Athletic, he became manager of Chelmsford in June 2001. On 18 August 2001, Parker managed his first game for Chelmsford, resulting in a 1–1 draw away to Bath City. In May 2003, after Parker's relationship with Chelmsford chairman Peter Wright broke down, he left the club. He later managed Welling United and was assistant manager at Folkestone Invicta.

In 2009, Parker was named as a coaching consultant and game development officer for Football Federation Northern Territory in Australia.

=== Managerial statistics ===
Managerial record by team and tenure
Team	From	To	Record				
Team	From	To	P	W	D	L	Win %
Chelmsford City	June 2001	May 2003	106	42	25	39	39.6

== Media career ==
Paul has ventured into media punditry and was the lead co-commentator with Steve Bower on Setanta Sports' live Conference National coverage. From 2011, Parker has worked as a pundit on ESPN Star Sports, Astro SuperSport in Malaysia, Mio Stadium and Channel NewsAsia in Singapore. He also writes a blog on Yahoo Eurosport. Besides this, he also travelled to Brazil for the 2014 World Cup to provide media analysis and coverage. This was the first World Cup he has attended since he participated as a player.

== Personal life ==
Parker was born in England to Jamaican parents. Parker's nephew is Ipswich Town full-back Ben Johnson.

== Honours ==
Manchester United

- Premier League: 1992–93, 1993–94
- FA Cup: 1993–94
- Football League Cup: 1991–92; runner-up: 1993–94
- FA Charity Shield: 1993

Individual

- PFA Team of the Year: 1986–87 Third Division, 1988–89 First Division
