= Kenny Mower =

English footballer

Personal information
- Full name: Kenneth Matthew Mower
- Date of birth: 1 December 1960 (age 65)
- Place of birth: Bloxwich, England
- Height: 6 ft 1 in (1.85 m)
- Position: Full back

Youth career
- Streetly Youth Club
- Walsall

Senior career*
Years	Team	Apps	(Gls)
1979–1991	Walsall	415	(8)
- Nuneaton Borough
- Stafford Rangers
- Bilston Town
- Blakenall
Total		415	(8)
- * Club domestic league appearances and goals

Kenneth Matthew Mower is an English former professional footballer who played as a full back, making over 400 career appearances.

== Career ==
Born in Bloxwich, Mower began his career with Streetly Youth Club. He joined Walsall in June 1976, turned professional in November 1978, and made his debut in the Football League in May 1979. He made a total of 415 appearances in the League for Walsall, before playing non-League football with Nuneaton Borough, Stafford Rangers, Bilston Town and Blakenall.

== Honours ==
Individual

- PFA Team of the Year: 1986–87 Third Division
