= Martin Pike (English footballer) =

English footballer

Personal information
- Date of birth: 21 October 1964 (age 62)
- Place of birth: South Shields, England
- Height: 5 ft 9 in (1.75 m)
- Position: Left-back

Youth career
- 1982–1983: West Bromwich Albion

Senior career*
Years	Team	Apps	(Gls)
1983–1986	Peterborough United	126	(8)
1986–1990	Sheffield United	129	(5)
1989–1990	→ Tranmere Rovers (loan)	2	(0)
1989–1990	→ Bolton Wanderers (loan)	5	(0)
1990–1994	Fulham	200	(14)
1994–1996	Rotherham United	9	(0)
1994–19??	Durham City		
Total		571	(27)
- * Club domestic league appearances and goals

Martin Pike (born 21 October 1964) is an English former professional football who played as a left-back. He made his name at Peterborough United playing in the Fourth Division and in his last season at The Posh he made the PFA Division Four Team of the Year. With Posh unable to gain promotion from the Fourth Division, Pike's impressive performances for Posh brought him to the attention of Billy McEwan, manager of Second Division Sheffield United. However, with United struggling in Pike's second season at United -1987–88 - McEwan was sacked and the Blades appointed Dave Bassett but he was unable to prevent relegation to the Third Division.

Pike survived Bassett's player exodus and recruitment of several players in the pre-season of 1988 and was a regular in the 1988–89 season, whilst also contributing several crucial goals from his customary left back slot, as United bounced back at the first attempt finishing second. However, Pike found himself on the sidelines back in the second division as Bassett signed another left back David Barnes. With first team opportunities now limited, Pike went out on loan first to Tranmere Rovers and then Bolton Wanderers before a permanent move to Fulham. Pike played over 200 games for Fulham before he ended his Football League career at Rotherham United, and also had a period with Durham City.
