= Mike Salmon (footballer) =

English footballer

Personal information
- Full name: Michael Bernard Salmon
- Date of birth: 14 July 1964 (age 62)
- Place of birth: Leyland, England
- Height: 6 ft 2 in (1.88 m)
- Position: Goalkeeper

Senior career*
Years	Team	Apps	(Gls)
1981–1983	Blackburn Rovers	1	(0)
1982	→ Chester (loan)	16	(0)
1983–1986	Stockport County	118	(0)
1986–1987	Bolton Wanderers	26	(0)
1987	→ Wrexham (loan)	17	(0)
1987–1989	Wrexham	83	(0)
1989–1999	Charlton Athletic	148	(0)
1998	→ Oxford United (loan)	1	(0)
1999–2002	Ipswich Town	0	(0)
Total		410	(0)
- * Club domestic league appearances and goals

Michael Bernard Salmon (born 14 July 1964) is an English football coach and former player.

== Career ==
Salmon played as a goalkeeper, and in a career of 21 years, spent ten of them with Charlton Athletic. He began his career as a trainee with Blackburn Rovers, making his debut in a 1–1 draw against Chelsea. He also gained experience early in his career with Chester, Stockport County, Bolton Wanderers and Wrexham before joining the "Addicks" in 1989. In and out of the first team at Charlton over the years due to a number of injuries, he made 148 league appearances, before a serious cruciate ligament injury, sustained in January 1998 against Manchester City at Maine Road, put an end to his first-team career. A disastrous single game on loan at Oxford United saw him concede seven goals. He finished his playing career at, then Premier League team Ipswich Town, as the back up 'keeper to England goalkeeper Richard Wright. He retired in 2002 having made around 500 first-team appearances and took up coaching.

== Coaching career ==
In 2002, he joined Arsenal as goalkeeping coach. He also coached the 1st Team 'keepers at Gillingham from 2002 to 2004. He remained with Arsenal until he emigrated to Canada with his family in 2007. He was the goalkeeper coach for Vancouver Whitecaps FC in Major League Soccer until 2011.

Salmon holds an English Football Association Goalkeeping 'A' Licence and a UEFA 'A' Coaching Licence.

== Honours ==
Individual

- PFA Team of the Year: 1985–86 Fourth Division
