= Steve Sherlock =

English footballer

Personal information
- Full name: Steven Edward Sherlock
- Date of birth: 10 May 1959 (age 67)
- Place of birth: Birmingham, England
- Height: 5 ft 9 in (1.75 m)
- Position: Full-back

Youth career
- Manchester City

Senior career*
Years	Team	Apps	(Gls)
1978–1979	Luton Town	2	(0)
1979–1986	Stockport County	245	(7)
1986–1987	Cardiff City	15	(0)
1987–1988	Newport County	49	(2)
- Stroud
Total		311	(9)
- * Club domestic league appearances and goals

Steven Edward Sherlock (born 10 May 1959) is an English former professional footballer who played as a full-back, making over 300 career appearances.

== Career ==
Sherlock played for Manchester City, Luton Town, Stockport County, Cardiff City, and Newport County, before playing non-league football for Stroud.
