= Neil Salathiel =

Welsh footballer

Personal information
- Full name: David Neil Salathiel
- Date of birth: 19 November 1962 (age 63)
- Place of birth: Wrexham, Wales
- Height: 5 ft 7 in (1.70 m)
- Position: Defender

Youth career
- Sheffield Wednesday

Senior career*
Years	Team	Apps	(Gls)
1980–1981	Wrexham	4	(0)
1981–1983	Crewe Alexandra	65	(0)
1983	Arcadia Shepherds		
1983–1990	Wrexham	240	(3)
1990	Telford United		
1991	Northwich Victoria		
1991–1992	Newtown		
1992	Bangor	21	(0)
1993	Mold Alexandra	5	(0)
1993–1995	Brymbo		
1996	Flint Town United	34	(1)
1997	Oswestry Town		
1997–1998	Holywell Town		
1999–2000	Flint Town United		
- * Club domestic league appearances and goals

David Neil Salathiel (born 19 November 1962) is a Welsh former professional footballer who played as a defender. He made over 300 appearances in the English Football League for Wrexham and Crewe Alexandra.

== Career ==
Salathiel was signed by Wrexham from the Sheffield Wednesday youth team. However, he only made four appearances for the club before leaving for Crewe Alexandra in 1981.

Salathiel then signed for South African club Arcadia Shepherds, but returned to Wrexham after less than a year, where he would spend 7 years, making 240 league appearances for the Welsh club.

After leaving Wrexham in 1990, he became a journeyman, playing for 9 different clubs in 10 years, including making over 50 appearances in the League of Wales.
