= Nigel Beaumont =

English footballer

Personal information
- Full name: Nigel Beaumont
- Date of birth: 11 February 1967 (age 59)
- Place of birth: Hemsworth, England
- Height: 6 ft 1 in (1.85 m)
- Position: Central defender

Youth career
- 1983–1985: Bradford City

Senior career*
| Years | Team | Apps | (Gls) |
| 1985–1988 | Bradford City | 2 | (0) |
| 1988–1992 | Wrexham | 115 | (4) |
- Telford United
- Brymbo
- Lex XI
| Total | | 117 | (4) |
- * Club domestic league appearances and goals

Nigel Beaumont (born 11 February 1967) is an English former professional footballer who made more than 100 Football League appearances playing as a central defender.

== Career ==
Born in Hemsworth, Beaumont played in the Football League for Bradford City and Wrexham. While at Wrexham, he was Player of the Season during 1989–90. He later played non-league football for Telford United, and in Wales for Brymbo and Lex XI. Beaumont was also an assistant manager at Lex XI.
