= Darren Wright (footballer, born 1968) =

English footballer

Personal information
- Full name: Darren James Wright
- Date of birth: 14 March 1968 (age 58)
- Place of birth: West Bromwich, England
- Height: 5 ft 10 in (1.78 m)
- Position: Left-back

Youth career
- Wolverhampton Wanderers

Senior career*
Years	Team	Apps	(Gls)
1985–1986	Wolverhampton Wanderers	1	(0)
1986–1991	Wrexham	110	(4)
1991–1992	Worcester City		
1996–1998	Cheltenham Town		
1998–1999	Stafford Rangers		
- Halesowen Town

Managerial career
- 2016: Panjab
- 2018–: Kernow
- * Club domestic league appearances and goals as of 14:48, 21 March 2018 (UTC)

Darren James Wright (born 14 March 1968) is an English former footballer who played as a defender. Originally a centre-back in his youth, he played professionally at full-back. He is the current head coach of the Kernow football team in Non-FIFA football.

== Playing career ==
Wright would get his start at Wolverhampton Wanderers, the club he supported, playing for their second team whilst still in school, however he would only make one senior appearance for the club – an away match at Plymouth Argyle.

In 1986 he would sign for Wrexham, where he would make 110 appearances in 4 years, winning Young Player of the Season in both the 1987–88 and 1988–89 seasons.

His Wrexham and fully professional career would come to an end through cruciate and cartilage damage in his knee, sustained in a match with Doncaster Rovers in a 50/50 challenge with forward Mark Rankine.

After his recovery, he would move to non-league football with Worcester City, spending a year at the Worcestershire club.

He would then move to Cheltenham Town, where, during his two-year spell there he would win promotion from the Doc Martens league to the Conference, and the FA Trophy.

After Cheltenham, he would move to Stafford Rangers before ending his career at Halesowen Town.

== Coaching career ==
After football, Wright would hold many coaching jobs, including senior team coach at Rushall Olympic, assistant manager at Continental Star and coaching youths at Wolverhampton Wanderers. He managed Panjab in 2016, taking them to the final of the 2016 ConIFA World Football Cup. In 2018 he took charge of the first Kernow football team.

== Personal life ==
During a charity game he played for Wrexham Veterans against Mold Alexandra on 12 July 2014, Wright suffered a heart attack. He made a full recovery and was still playing charity matches in 2015.

== Honours ==
=== Individual ===
Wrexham

- Young Player of the Season: 1987–88, 1988–89

=== Team ===
Cheltenham Town

- Promotion from Southern Football League: 1996–97
- FA Trophy: 1997–98
