= John Clayton (footballer, born 1961) =

Scottish footballer

Personal information
- Date of birth: 20 August 1961 (age 65)
- Place of birth: Elgin, Scotland
- Height: 5 ft 11 in (1.80 m)
- Position: Striker

Senior career*
Years	Team	Apps	(Gls)
1978–1982	Derby County	24	(4)
1982–1983	Bulova	26	(14)
1983–1984	Chesterfield	33	(5)
1984–1985	Tranmere Rovers	47	(35)
1985–1988	Plymouth Argyle	77	(21)
1988–1990	Fortuna Sittard	47	(16)
1990–1992	FC Volendam	61	(18)
1992–1993	Burnley	3	(1)
Total		318	(114)
- * Club domestic league appearances and goals

John Clayton (born 20 August 1961) is a Scottish former professional footballer. A striker, he made over 150 appearances in the English Football League and had spells playing in Hong Kong and the Netherlands.

A product of the Scottish Highland Football League, Clayton began his professional football career with his home town club, Elgin City FC, then of the Scottish Highland Football League, prior to transferring to England with Derby County, signing with the club at the age of 17 after completing his A-levels. He was forced to retire in 1993 due to persistent back problems that required surgery.

Following his retirement, Clayton moved to Bristol in 1995 because of his wife's business and started assisting Bristol City to coach the various levels of youth football at their academy where his son Jon was playing. He later worked as assistant to Keith Millen with the club's under-17 side and, in October 2006, he was appointed as head coach of Bristol City's academy. In a backroom reshuffle in 2012, Clayton was put in charge of the under-18's side with Willie McStay replacing him as academy boss.
