= EFL League Two play-offs =

Annual postseason elimination tournament of English Football League

- Sport: Football
- Founded: 1987
- No. of teams: 4
- Region: England; Wales
- Broadcasters: United Kingdom: Sky Sports; International: Varies by territory
- Streaming partners: United Kingdom: Sky Go; NOW TV; International: Varies by region

The EFL League Two play-offs are a series of play-off matches contested by the association football teams finishing from fourth to seventh in EFL League Two, the fourth tier of the English football league system. They are part of the annual EFL playoffs. As of 2022, the play-offs comprise two semi-finals, where the team finishing fourth plays the team finishing seventh, and the team finishing fifth plays the team finishing sixth, each conducted as a two-legged tie. The winners of the semi-finals progress to the final which is contested at Wembley Stadium.

For the first three years, the play-off final took place over two legs, played at both side's grounds. Aldershot won the first Fourth Division play-off final in 1987, beating Wolverhampton Wanderers 3–0 on aggregate. From 1990, the play-off final was a one-off match, hosted at the original Wembley Stadium, while from 2001 to 2006, the final was played at the Millennium Stadium in Cardiff as Wembley was being rebuilt. Since 2007, the match has been hosted at Wembley Stadium except for the 2011 final which took place at Old Trafford to avoid a clash with the 2011 UEFA Champions League Final.

When the fourth tier play-offs were first contested in 1987, they were known as the Football League Fourth Division play-offs. From 1993 to 2004, following the creation of the FA Premier League as a breakaway from the Football League, the competition became known as the Third Division play-offs, and since 2005 has taken its current name as the League Two play-offs following a rebranding of the remaining three divisions of the Football League.

== Format ==
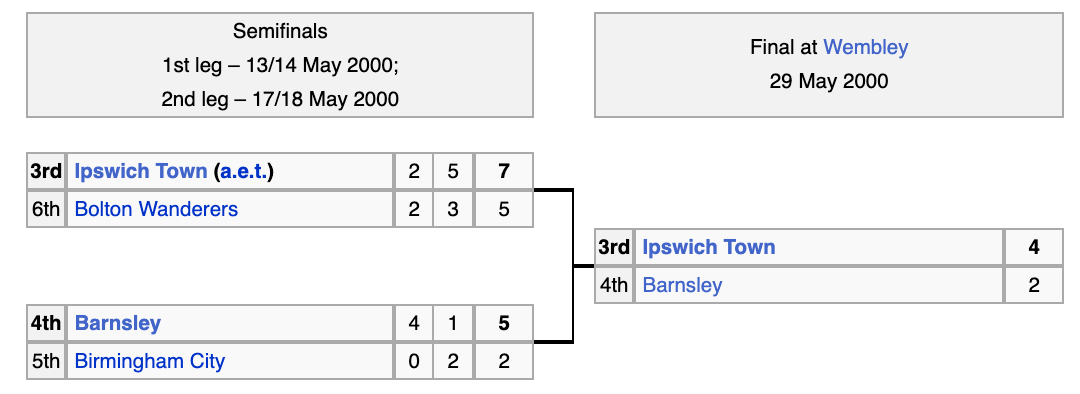
An example of the play-off format, from the 2000 Second Division play-offs

As of 2021, the League Two play-offs involve the four teams that finish directly below the automatic promotion places in EFL League Two, the fourth tier of the English football league system. These teams meet in a series of play-off matches to determine the final team that will be promoted to the EFL League One. Based on the rankings, the team finishing in fourth place plays the seventh-placed team while the team in fifth plays the sixth-placed team in the "play-off semi-finals". Two ties are played over two legs, with the higher-ranked side hosting the second leg. According to the EFL, "this is designed to give the highest finishing team an advantage".

The winner of each semi-final is determined by the aggregate score across the two legs, with the number of goals scored in each match of the tie being added together. The team with the higher aggregate score qualifies for the final. If, at the end of regular 90 minutes of the second leg, the aggregate score is level then the match goes into extra time where two 15-minute halves are played. If the score remains level at the end of extra time, the tie is decided by a penalty shootout. The away goals rule does not apply in the play-off semi-finals.

The clubs that win the semi-finals then meet at Wembley Stadium, a neutral venue, for a one-off match referred to as the "play-off final". If required, extra time and a penalty shootout can be employed in the same manner as for the semi-finals to determine the winner. The runner-up and losing semi-finalists remain in League Two while the winning side are promoted. The match, along with the finals of the Championship and League One play-offs, usually takes place over the long weekend of the second bank holiday in May.

== Background ==
The mid-1980s saw a decline in attendances at football matches and public disenchantment with English football. A number of instances of violence and tragedy struck the game. In March 1985, at the semi-final of the 1984–85 Football League Cup between Chelsea and Sunderland, more than 100 people were arrested after various invasions of the Stamford Bridge pitch and more than 40 people, including 20 policemen, were injured. Nine days later, violence flared at the FA Cup match between Millwall and Luton Town; seats were used as missiles against the police and resulted in Luton Town banning away supporters. On 11 May, 56 people were killed and 265 injured in the Bradford City stadium fire. Less than three weeks later, 39 supporters died and more than 600 were injured in the Heysel Stadium disaster where Liverpool were playing Juventus in the European Cup final.

Initially the Play-Offs would operate for two years, but if they proved popular with spectators they could become a permanent part of the calendar.

— Heathrow Agreement

In an attempt to persuade fans to return to the stadia, the Football League had rejected a £19 million television deal to broadcast matches live on the BBC and ITV before the 1985–86 Football League season, with League president Jack Dunnett suggesting that "football is prepared to have a year or two with no television". In December 1985, the "Heathrow Agreement" was agreed which aimed to revitalise the financial affairs of the league. It was a ten-point plan which included a structural reorganisation of the league, reducing the top tier from 22 clubs to 20, and the introduction of play-offs to facilitate the change. The play-offs were introduced to the end of the 1986–87 Football League season. They were initially introduced for two years with the proviso that if they were successful with the general public, they would be retained permanently.

== History ==
In the first two seasons, the team one place above the relegation zone in the Third Division, along with the three clubs below the automatic promotion positions in the Fourth Division, took part in the play-offs. In the inaugural play-offs in 1987, Third Division Bolton Wanderers were eliminated in the semi-finals by Fourth Division side Aldershot who replaced them when they won the final. The following season, Rotherham United also swapped places with Fourth Division opposition when they lost to Swansea City in the semi-finals who defeated Torquay in the final 5–4 on aggregate.

EFL League Two play-off nomenclature
Years	Name
1987–1992	Football League Fourth Division play-offs
1993–2004	Football League Third Division play-offs
2005–2015	Football League Two play-offs
2016–present	EFL League Two play-offs

The primary objective of the play-offs was achieved within the first two seasons, namely the reorganisation of the four leagues with 20 clubs in the first tier and 24 in the second to fourth tiers. However, the popularity of the play-offs was such that the post-season games were retained and the play-offs were the first to feature four teams from the Fourth Division: Leyton Orient defeated Wrexham over two legs in the 1989 Football League Fourth Division play-off final. From 1990, the format of the final changed to a single match played at a neutral venue, initially the original Wembley Stadium. The first winners of the inaugural one-off final were Cambridge United who beat Chesterfield 1–0 in front of 26,404 spectators.

Wembley underwent renovations early in the 21st century and the 2000 final was the last to be hosted at the original stadium. Subsequently the finals were hosted at the Millennium Stadium in Cardiff, where Blackpool won their second fourth-tier play-off final, beating Leyton Orient 4–2 in the final watched by a crowd of 23,600. The Millennium Stadium held the finals until 2007 when the match was moved to the renovated Wembley Stadium, the first such final seeing Bristol Rovers defeat Shrewsbury Town 3–1 with an attendance of 61,589.

The game was relocated to Manchester United's ground, Old Trafford, for a single season as a result of a scheduling clash with the 2011 UEFA Champions League Final. The most recent final, in 2020, was held behind closed doors as a result of the COVID-19 pandemic in the United Kingdom: Northampton Town defeated Exeter City 4–0 in front of an official attendance of 0.

Since the first play-off final, the third tier of English football's league itself has undergone a number of re-brands. In 1993, the Premier League was formed, a move which caused the fourth-tier league to be renamed as the Third Division. In 2004, the Third Division was re-branded as Football League Two, before the League's adoption of English Football League (EFL) led to a 2016 renaming as the EFL League Two.

== Prize ==
The financial value of winning the EFL League Two play-off is derived from the additional remuneration clubs receive in League One. As of 2020, clubs in League One receive around £675,000 from the Premier League as a "core club" payment compared to £450,000 in League Two. The winners of the final receive a trophy.

== Winners and semi-finalists ==
Key to list of winners and semi-finalists
Year	Link to play-off article for specified year
Venue	Location(s) of the final match(es)
Winner (X)	Team that won play-off final, (X) indicates cumulative number of play-off final victories
Final	Link to play-off final article for the specified match
^	Final played over two legs
R	Final decided by a replay
†	Final decided in extra time
‡	Final decided by a penalty shoot-out
Runner-up	Team that lost play-off final
Semi-finalists	Two teams that lost in play-off semi-finals

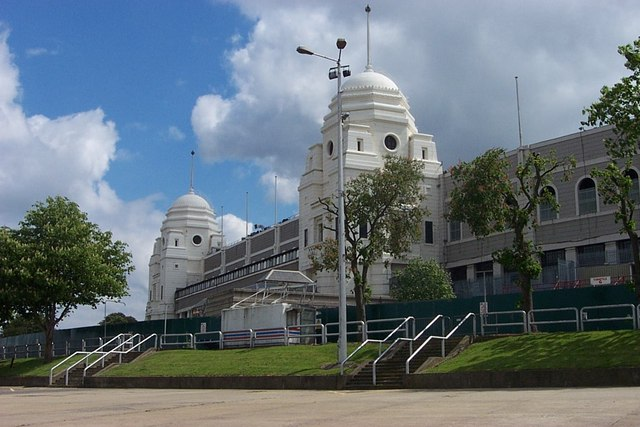
The original Wembley Stadium hosted the fourth-tier play-off final between 1990 and 2000.

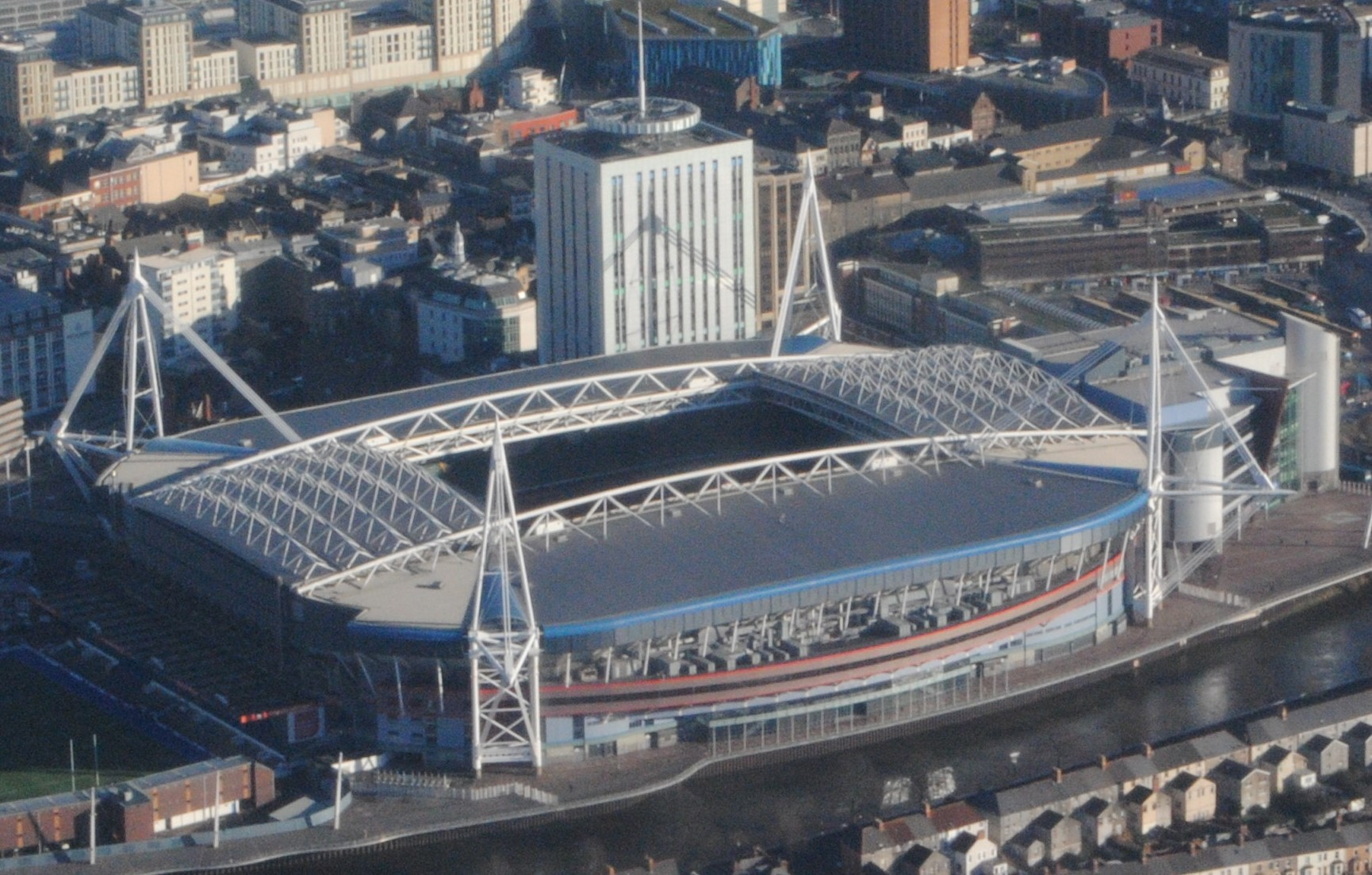
The final was held at the Millennium Stadium in Cardiff between 2001 and 2006 while Wembley was being redeveloped.

The redeveloped Wembley Stadium has been host to the League Two play-off final every year since 2007 except in 2011.

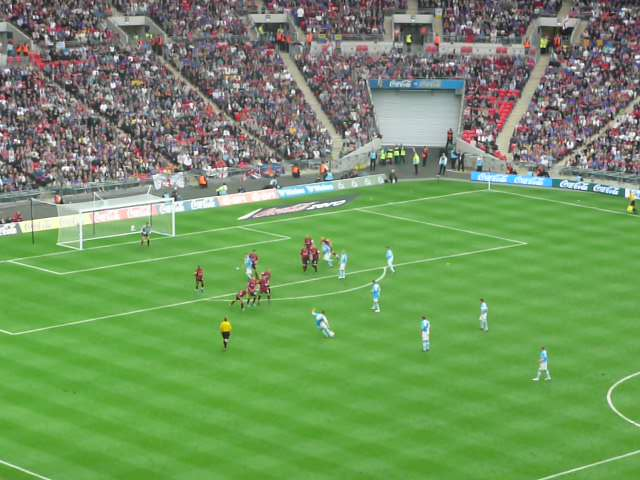
Bristol Rovers playing Shrewsbury Town in the 2007 Football League Two play-off final.

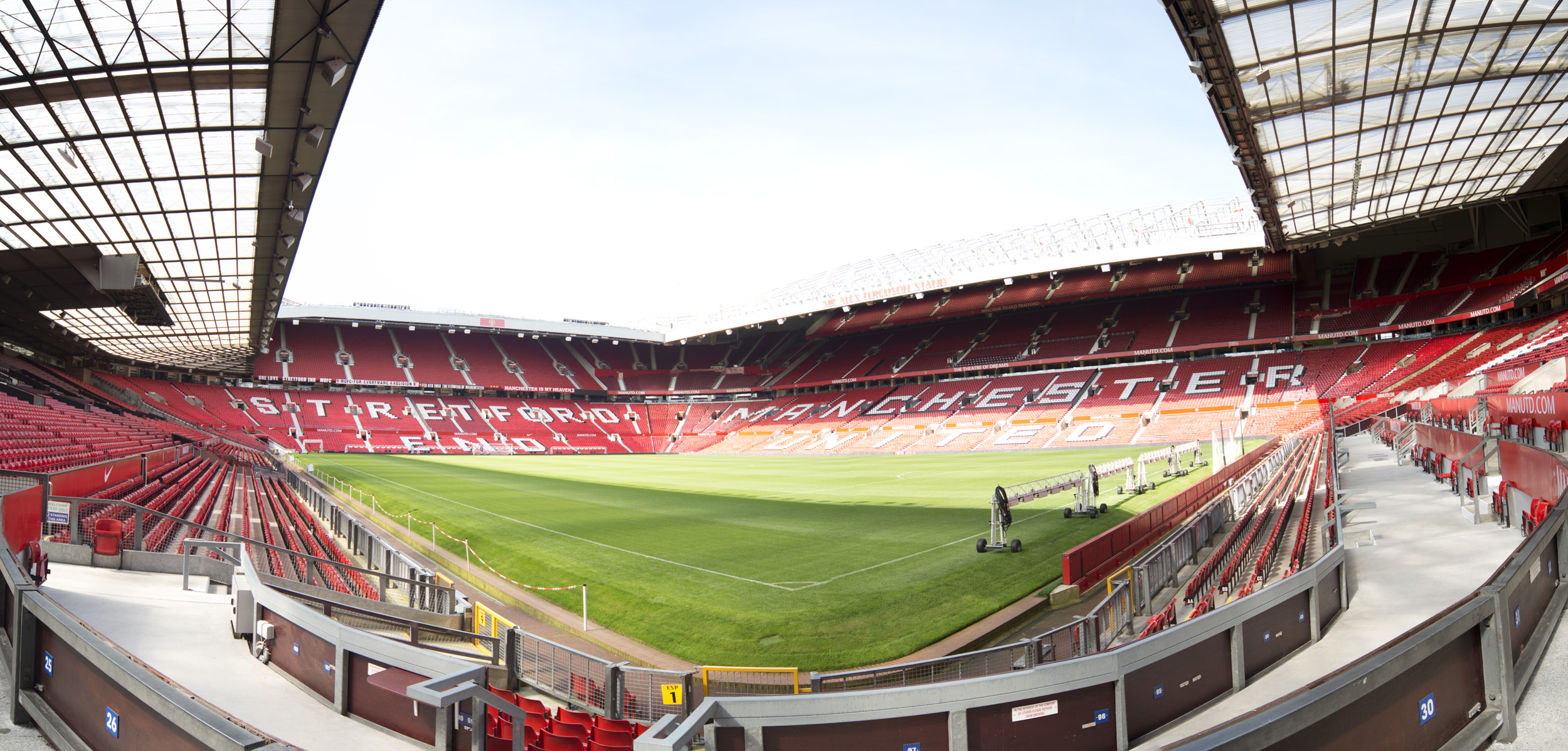
In 2011, Old Trafford was used for the final to avoid a clash with the Champions League final.

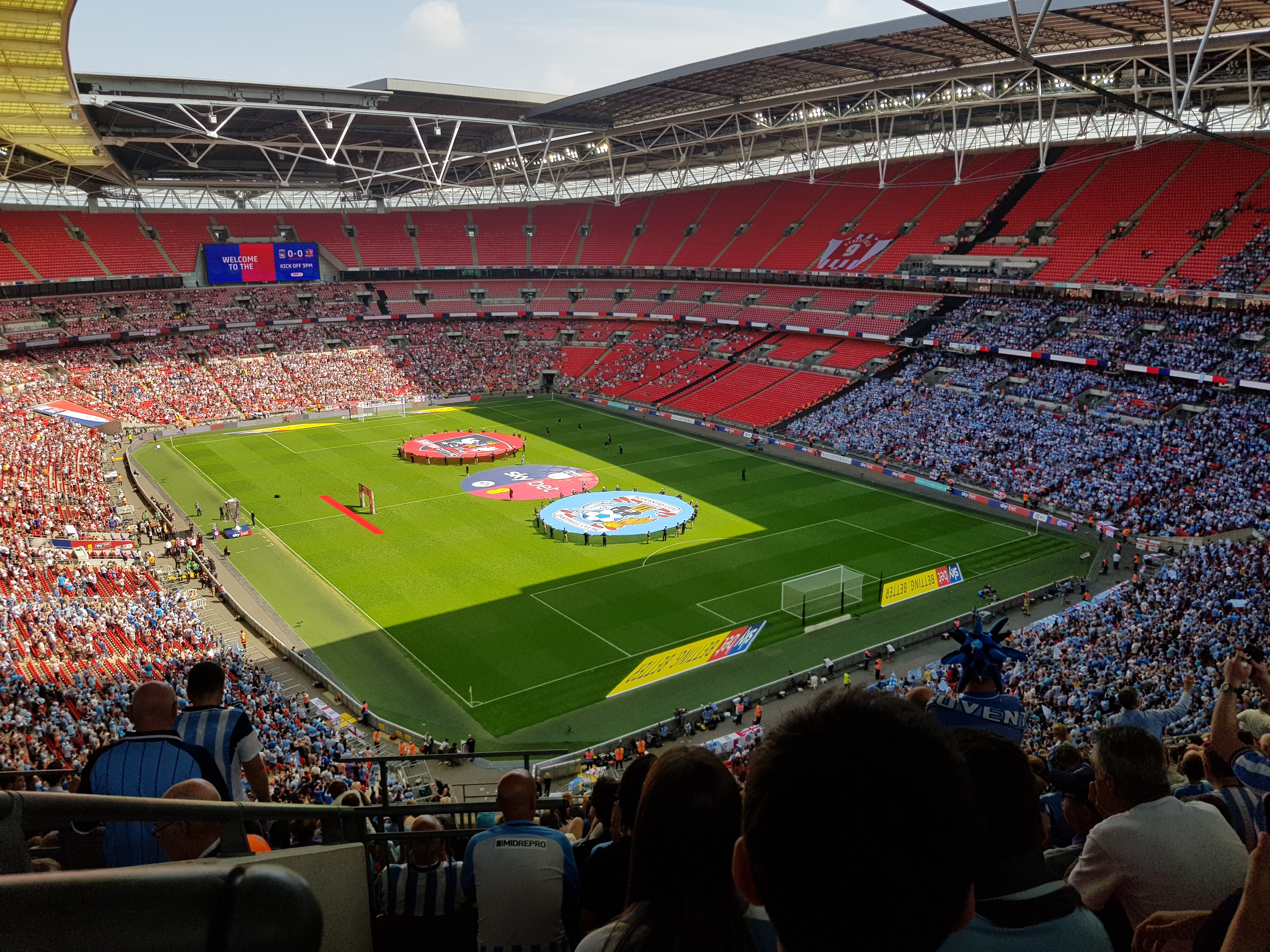
Wembley Stadium before the 2018 EFL League Two play-off final

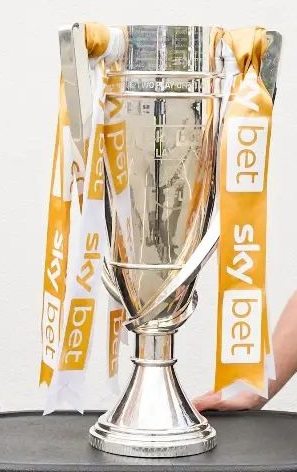
The trophy awarded to the play-off winners, pictured in Port Vale colours in 2022

Winners of the EFL League Two play-offs along with runners-up and semi-finalists
Year	Venue	Winner	Final	Runner-up	Semi-finalists	Ref.
1987	Recreation Ground/Molineux ^	Aldershot (1)	3–0	Wolverhampton Wanderers	Bolton Wanderers; Colchester United	
1988	Vetch Field/Plainmoor ^	Swansea City (1)	5–4	Torquay United	Rotherham United; Scunthorpe United	
1989	Racecourse Ground/Brisbane Road ^	Leyton Orient (1)	2–1	Wrexham	Scarborough; Scunthorpe United	
1990	Wembley Stadium (original)	Cambridge United (1)	1–0	Chesterfield	Maidstone United; Stockport County	
1991	Wembley Stadium (original)	Torquay United (1)	2–2 ‡ (Note: Torquay United won the 1991 Football League Fourth Division play-off final with a 5–4 penalty shoot-out victory over Blackpool.)	Blackpool	Burnley; Scunthorpe United	
1992	Wembley Stadium (original)	Blackpool (1)	1–1 ‡ (Note: Blackpool won the 1992 Football League Fourth Division play-off final with a 4–3 penalty shoot-out victory over Scunthorpe United.)	Scunthorpe United	Barnet; Crewe Alexandra	
1993	Wembley Stadium (original)	York City (1)	1–1 ‡ (Note: York City won the 1993 Football League Third Division play-off final with a 5–3 penalty shoot-out victory over Crewe Alexandra.)	Crewe Alexandra	Bury; Walsall	
1994	Wembley Stadium (original)	Wycombe Wanderers (1)	4–2	Preston North End	Carlisle United; Torquay United	
1995	Wembley Stadium (original)	Chesterfield (1)	2–0	Bury	Mansfield Town; Preston North End	
1996	Wembley Stadium (original)	Plymouth Argyle (1)	1–0	Darlington	Colchester United; Hereford United	
1997	Wembley Stadium (original)	Northampton Town (1)	1–0	Swansea City	Cardiff City; Chester City	
1998	Wembley Stadium (original)	Colchester United (1)	1–0	Torquay United	Barnet; Scarborough	
1999	Wembley Stadium (original)	Scunthorpe United (1)	1–0	Leyton Orient	Rotherham United; Swansea City	
2000	Wembley Stadium (original)	Peterborough United (1)	1–0	Darlington	Barnet; Hartlepool United	
2001	Millennium Stadium	Blackpool (2)	4–2	Leyton Orient	Hartlepool United; Hull City	
2002	Millennium Stadium	Cheltenham Town (1)	3–1	Rushden & Diamonds	Hartlepool United; Rochdale	
2003	Millennium Stadium	Bournemouth (1)	5–2	Lincoln City	Bury; Scunthorpe United	
2004	Millennium Stadium	Huddersfield Town (1)	0–0 ‡ (Note: Huddersfield Town won the 2004 Football League Third Division play-off final with a 4–1 penalty shoot-out victory over Mansfield Town.)	Mansfield Town	Lincoln City; Northampton Town	
2005	Millennium Stadium	Southend United (1)	2–0 †	Lincoln City	Macclesfield Town; Northampton Town	
2006	Millennium Stadium	Cheltenham Town (2)	1–0	Grimsby Town	Lincoln City; Wycombe Wanderers	
2007	Wembley Stadium	Bristol Rovers (1)	3–1	Shrewsbury Town	Lincoln City; Milton Keynes Dons	
2008	Wembley Stadium	Stockport County (1)	3–2	Rochdale	Darlington; Wycombe Wanderers	
2009	Wembley Stadium	Gillingham (1)	1–0	Shrewsbury Town	Bury; Rochdale	
2010	Wembley Stadium	Dagenham & Redbridge (1)	3–2	Rotherham United	Aldershot Town; Morecambe	
2011	Old Trafford	Stevenage (1)	1–0	Torquay United	Accrington Stanley; Shrewsbury Town	
2012	Wembley Stadium	Crewe Alexandra (1)	2–0	Cheltenham Town	Southend United; Torquay United	
2013	Wembley Stadium	Bradford City (1)	3–0	Northampton Town	Burton Albion; Cheltenham Town	
2014	Wembley Stadium	Fleetwood Town (1)	1–0	Burton Albion	Southend United; York City	
2015	Wembley Stadium	Southend United (2)	1–1 ‡ (Note: Southend United won the 2015 Football League Two play-off final with a 7–6 penalty shoot-out victory over Wycombe Wanderers.)	Wycombe Wanderers	Plymouth Argyle; Stevenage	
2016	Wembley Stadium	AFC Wimbledon (1)	2–0	Plymouth Argyle	Accrington Stanley; Portsmouth	
2017	Wembley Stadium	Blackpool (3)	2–1	Exeter City	Carlisle United; Luton Town	
2018	Wembley Stadium	Coventry City (1)	3–1	Exeter City	Lincoln City; Notts County	
2019	Wembley Stadium	Tranmere Rovers (1)	1–0 †	Newport County	Forest Green Rovers; Mansfield Town	
2020	Wembley Stadium	Northampton Town (2)	4–0	Exeter City	Cheltenham Town; Colchester United	
2021	Wembley Stadium	Morecambe (1)	1–0 †	Newport County	Tranmere Rovers; Forest Green Rovers	
2022	Wembley Stadium	Port Vale (1)	3–0	Mansfield Town	Northampton Town; Swindon Town	
2023	Wembley Stadium	Carlisle United (1)	1–1 ‡ (Note: Carlisle United won the 2023 EFL League Two play-off final with a 5–4 penalty shoot-out victory over Stockport County.)	Stockport County	Salford City; Bradford City	
2024	Wembley Stadium	Crawley Town (1)	2–0	Crewe Alexandra	Doncaster Rovers; Milton Keynes Dons	
2025	Wembley Stadium	AFC Wimbledon (2)	1–0	Walsall	Notts County; Chesterfield	
2026	Wembley Stadium	Notts County (1)	3–0	Salford City	Grimsby Town; Chesterfield	

== Records ==
Blackpool have been promoted from the fourth tier of English football by winning the play-off final on three occasions, more than any other team, while Cheltenham Town, Northampton Town, Southend United and AFC Wimbledon have won two finals. Both Exeter City and Torquay United have lost in the final three times.
