= Kirk Stephens =

English footballer and manager

Personal information
- Full name: Kirk William Stephens
- Date of birth: 27 February 1955 (age 71)
- Place of birth: Coventry, England
- Position: Defender

Youth career
- 1969–1973: Coventry City

Senior career*
Years	Team	Apps	(Gls)
1973–1978	Nuneaton Borough	386	
1978–1984	Luton Town	227	(2)
1984–1986	Coventry City	34	(2)
- Nuneaton Borough
- * Club domestic league appearances and goals

Kirk William Stephens (born 27 February 1955) is an English former football player, best known for his time at Luton Town and Coventry City.

== Playing career ==
Kirk Stephens started out as a schoolboy with local club Coventry City, but after four years on their books he was told he wasn't yet up to top-flight standard. Stephens joined non-League Nuneaton Borough, managed by David Pleat. After five years, Pleat moved on to Second Division side Luton Town, and one of his first signings for his new club was the 23-year-old Stephens. He made his debut on 19 August 1978, in a 6–1 home win over Oldham Athletic, and went on to play 227 times for the club, scoring twice.

He was sold to his home town club Coventry City in 1984, and he played 34 times for them over two seasons before injury forced an end to his professional career. He returned to his former team Nuneaton Borough. He also played at Barnet scoring two goals
