= 1989 Football League play-offs =

Football League play-offs
- Season: 1988–89
- Champions: Crystal Palace (Second Division); Port Vale (Third Division); Leyton Orient (Fourth Division)
- Matches: 18
- Goals: 38 (2.11 per match)
- Biggest home win: C. Palace 3–0 Blackburn (Second Division)
- Biggest away win: Fulham 0–4 Bristol Rovers (Third Division)
- Highest scoring: Blackburn 3–1 C. Palace; Fulham 0–4 Bristol Rovers; Port Vale 3–1 Preston; Wrexham 3–1 Scunthorpe (4 goals)
- Highest attendance: 30,000 – Crystal Palace v Blackburn (Second Division final)
- Lowest attendance: 4,377 – Scarborough v Leyton Orient (Fourth Division semi-final)
- Average attendance: 12,994

The Football League play-offs for the 1988–89 season were held in May 1989, with the two-legged finals taking place at the finalists home stadiums. The play-off semi-finals were also played over two legs and were contested by the teams who finished in 3rd, 4th, 5th and 6th place in the Football League Second Division and Football League Third Division and the 4th, 5th, 6th and 7th placed teams in the Football League Fourth Division table. The winners of the semi-finals progressed through to the finals, with the winner of these matches either gaining promotion or avoiding relegation for the following season.

== Background ==
The Football League play-offs have been held every year since 1987. They take place for each division following the conclusion of the regular season and are contested by the four clubs finishing below the automatic promotion places. For the first three seasons the final was played over two legs but this was changed to a single match at Wembley Stadium from 1990.

== Second Division ==
Pos	Team	Pld	W	D	L	GF	GA	GD	Pts
3	Crystal Palace	46	23	12	11	71	49	+22	81
4	Watford	46	22	12	12	74	48	+26	78
5	Blackburn Rovers	46	22	11	13	74	49	+15	77
6	Swindon Town	46	20	16	10	68	53	+15	76

=== Semi-finals ===
First leg

21 May 1989
15:00

Blackburn Rovers	0–0	Watford

Ewood Park, Blackburn
Attendance: 14,028

21 May 1989
15:00

Swindon Town	1–0	Crystal Palace
Hopkins (o.g.)

County Ground, Swindon
Attendance: 16,658

Second leg

24 May 1989
19:45

Watford	1–1 (a.e.t.)	Blackburn Rovers
Redfearn		Garner

Vicarage Road, Watford
Attendance: 13,852

Watford 1–1 Blackburn Rovers on aggregate. Blackburn Rovers won on away goals.

24 May 1989
20:00

Crystal Palace	2–0	Swindon Town
Bright; Wright

Selhurst Park, London
Attendance: 23,677

Crystal Palace won 2–1 on aggregate.

=== Final ===
First leg

31 May 1989
19:45

Blackburn Rovers	3–1	Crystal Palace
Gayle 21', 27'; Garner 90'		McGoldrick 86'

Ewood Park, Blackburn
Attendance: 16,421
Referee: Joe Worrall

Second leg

3 June 1989
15:00

Crystal Palace	3–0 (a.e.t.)	Blackburn Rovers
Wright 17', 117'; Madden 47' (pen.)

Selhurst Park, London
Attendance: 30,000
Referee: George Courtney

Crystal Palace won 4–3 on aggregate.

== Third Division ==
Pos	Team	Pld	W	D	L	GF	GA	GD	Pts
3	Port Vale	46	24	12	10	78	48	+30	84
4	Fulham	46	22	9	15	69	67	+2	75
5	Bristol Rovers	46	19	17	10	67	51	+16	74
6	Preston North End	46	19	15	12	79	60	+19	72

=== Semi-finals ===
First leg

21 May 1989
15:00

Bristol Rovers	1–0	Fulham
Penrice

Twerton Park, Bath
Attendance: 9,029

22 May 1989
19:45

Preston North End	1–1	Port Vale
Jemson		Earle

Deepdale, Preston
Attendance: 14,321

Second leg

25 May 1989
19:30

Fulham	0–4	Bristol Rovers
		Clark; Holloway; Bailey; Reece

Craven Cottage, London
Attendance: 10,188

Bristol Rovers won 5–0 on aggregate.

25 May 1989
19:30

Port Vale	3–1	Preston North End
Beckford		Patterson

Vale Park, Stoke-on-Trent
Attendance: 13,416

Port Vale won 4–2 on aggregate.

=== Final ===
First leg

31 May 1989
20:00

Bristol Rovers	1–1	Port Vale
Penrice		Earle 73'

Twerton Park, Bath
Attendance: 9,042
Referee: Allan Gunn

Second leg

3 June 1989
15:00

Port Vale	1–0	Bristol Rovers
Earle 52'

Vale Park, Stoke-on-Trent
Attendance: 17,353
Referee: Keith Hackett

Port Vale won 2–1 on aggregate.

== Fourth Division ==
Pos	Team	Pld	W	D	L	GF	GA	GD	Pts
4	Scunthorpe United	46	21	14	11	77	57	+20	77
5	Scarborough	46	21	14	11	67	52	+15	77
6	Leyton Orient	46	21	12	13	86	50	+36	75
7	Wrexham	46	19	14	13	77	63	+14	71

=== Semi-finals ===
First leg

21 May 1989
12:00

Leyton Orient	2–0	Scarborough
Cooper

Brisbane Road, London
Attendance: 9,298

21 May 1989
14:00

Wrexham	3–1	Scunthorpe United
Wright; Kearns		Cowling

Racecourse Ground, Wrexham
Attendance: 5,449

Second leg

24 May 1989
19:30

Scarborough	1–0	Leyton Orient
Russell

McCain Stadium, Scarborough
Attendance: 4,377

Leyton Orient won 2–1 on aggregate.

25 May 1989
19:30

Scunthorpe United	0–2	Wrexham
		Russell

Glanford Park, Scunthorpe
Attendance: 5,516

Wrexham won 5–1 on aggregate.

=== Final ===
First leg

30 May 1989
19:45

Wrexham	0–0	Leyton Orient

Racecourse Ground, Wrexham
Attendance: 7,915
Referee: Terry Holbrook

Second leg

3 June 1989
12:00

Leyton Orient	2–1	Wrexham
Harvey 45'; Cooper		Bowden 47'

Brisbane Road, London
Attendance: 13,355
Referee: John Martin

Leyton Orient won 2–1 on aggregate.
